= J.League designated special players =

Wikimedia list article

This is a list of J.League designated special players, picked by J.League clubs from universities and high schools all over Japan.

== System information ==
The system, in place since 1998, aims to provide high potential players "a suitable environment in accordance with the player's ability." Most young players are registered with their university or high school until they are at least 18 and as such cannot be registered with another team. The 'designated special players' system allows J.League clubs to invite a maximum of three players to train and play in J.League competitions, without changing their registration status from their current registered team. Therefore, during this time, the player is allowed to play for both their educational institution and their J.League club. This provides the players an opportunity to train and play at a higher level, whilst also giving the clubs an opportunity to sell themselves as a potential destination upon completion of their studies. Although most of the time players go on to sign a professional contract with their host club, there is no guarantees or assurances that it will always be the case.

A player is eligible to become a designated special players if they fulfill the following requirements:

- They have an official offer from a J. League club
- They have Japanese citizenship or do not apply as a foreign player
- They registered with teams under the Japan University Football Association, the All Japan High School Athletic Federation, or teams of the Japan Club Youth Federation Level 2 other than J.League club teams.

Once approved, the players can then participate in any of the following competitions:

- J1, J2, J3 League matches
- League Cup matches
- Pre-season matches
- J.League promotion/relegation play-off matches
- Other official matches organised by J.League and the Japan FA

== Key ==
Legend	Meaning
Highlighted row	Player made appearances whilst registered as a designated special player
**Bold**	Player has gone on to represent the Japan national football team

Player
Full name of the player.
From
The institution or institutions football club which the player is registered for (usually their university or high school)
To
The J.League club which the player is designated to.
Games played
The number of caps and goals the player has played whilst a designated special player, including the competition in which they were attained.
Year of affiliation
The year and team in which the player signed a professional contract with.

== Designated special players ==
=== 1998 ===
Player	From	To	Games played	Year of affiliation
Fumiya Iwamaru	Maebashi Ikuei High School	Urawa Red Diamonds		2000 – Vissel Kobe
Tsutomu Fujihara	Kobe Koryo Gakuen High School	Vissel Kobe		1999 – Cerezo Osaka
Masashi Kuwahon	Taisha High School	Sanfrecce Hiroshima		1999 – Fukuoka University
Mitsuru Chiyotanda	Higashi Fukuoka High School	Avispa Fukuoka		1999 – University of Tsukuba
Tomoyuki Yoshino	Narashino High School	Kashiwa Reysol		1999 – Urawa Red Diamonds
Norihiro Nishi	Ichiritsu Funabashi High School	Yokohama Flügels		1999 – Júbilo Iwata
Taichi Hasegawa	Mizuhashi High School	Nagoya Grampus Eight		1999 – Albirex Niigata
Terawaki	Kusatsu Higashi High School	Kyoto Sanga		1999 – Doshisha University
Keiji Tamada	Narashino High School	Kashiwa Reysol		1999 – Kashiwa Reysol
Takuma Sugano	Narashino High School	JEF United Chiba		1999 – JEF United Chiba

=== 1999 ===
Player	From	To	Games played	Year of affiliation
Hideaki Ueno	Noboribetsu Otani High School	Consadole Sapporo		2000 – Kyoto Sanga
Kyohei Noda	Nihon University High School	Verdy Kawasaki		2000 – Verdy Kawasaki
Kenji Haneda	Ichiritsu Funabashi High School	Urawa Red Diamonds		2000 – Kashima Antlers
Takeshi Omoto	Yachiyo High School	Kashiwa Reysol		2000 – University of Tsukuba
Kosuke Yatsuda	Yanagawa High School	Avispa Fukuoka		2000 – Sanfrecce Hiroshima
**Koji Yamase**	Hokkai High School	Consadole Sapporo		2000 – Consadole Sapporo
Yuki Matsushita	Maebashi Ikuei High School	Urawa Red Diamonds		2000 – Sanfrecce Hiroshima
**Ryoichi Maeda**	Gyosei High School	Verdy Kawasaki		2000 – Júbilo Iwata
Masamichi Yamada	Yamashiro High School	Kyoto Sanga		2000 – Waseda University
Kyohei Yamagata	Higashi Fukuoka High School	Avispa Fukuoka		2000 – Sanfrecce Hiroshima
Yota Araki	Sano Nihon University High School	Urawa Red Diamonds		2000 – Hosei University
Hayato Yano	Teikyo High School	Verdy Kawasaki	J1: 2 caps, 0 goals	2000 – Verdy Kawasaki
Daiki Takamatsu	Takagawa Gakuen High School	Sanfrecce Hiroshima		2000 – Oita Trinita
Genki Nakayama	Takagawa Gakuen High School	Sanfrecce Hiroshima		2000 – Sanfrecce Hiroshima

=== 2000 ===
Player	From	To	Games played	Year of affiliation
Yuki Uekusa	Ichiritsu Funabashi High School	Kashiwa Reysol		2001 – Waseda University
Takuto Hayashi	Konko Osaka High School	Cerezo Osaka		2001 – Sanfrecce Hiroshima
Takeshi Aoki	Maebashi Ikuei High School	Urawa Red Diamonds		2001 – Kashiwa Reysol
Sota Nakazawa	Ichiritsu Funabashi High School	Kashiwa Reysol		2001 – Kashiwa Reysol
Naoya Kikuchi	Shimizu Shogyo High School	Shimizu S-Pulse		2003 – Júbilo Iwata
Shunta Nagai	Ichiritsu Funabashi High School	JEF United Chiba		2001 – Kashiwa Reysol
Takumi Motohashi	Ichiritsu Funabashi High School	FC Tokyo		2001 – Yokohama F. Marinos
Sho Naruoka	Fujieda Higashi High School	Júbilo Iwata		2003 – Júbilo Iwata
Hiroyuki Nishijima	Nara Ikuei High School	Kyoto Sanga		2001 – Sanfrecce Hiroshima
Shunsuke Araki	Higashi Fukuoka High School	Avispa Fukuoka		2001 – Chuo University
**Yoshito Ōkubo**	Kunimi High School	Avispa Fukuoka		2001 – Cerezo Osaka
Hiroto Mogi	Seiko Gakuin High School	Vegalta Sendai		2002 – Sanfrecce Hiroshima
Tatsuya Tanaka	Teikyo High School	FC Tokyo		2001 – Urawa Red Diamonds
Yuya Sano	Shimizu Shogyo High School	Shimizu S-Pulse		2001 – Tokyo Verdy
Yutaka Tahara	Kagoshima Jitsugyo High School	Avispa Fukuoka		2001 – Yokohama F. Marinos

=== 2001 ===
Player	From	To	Games played	Year of affiliation
Kenta Tokushige	Kunimi High School	Avispa Fukuoka		2002 – Urawa Red Diamonds
Ryota Aoki	Ichiritsu Funabashi High School	FC Tokyo		2003 – Gamba Osaka
Masatomo Kuba	Toko Gakuen High School	Tokyo Verdy		2003 – Tokyo Verdy
Tatsuya Kamohara	Kunimi High School	Avispa Fukuoka		2002 – Kokushikan University
Yutaro Abe	Toin Gakuen High School	Yokohama F. Marinos		2003 – Yokohama F. Marinos

=== 2002 ===
Player	From	To	Games played	Year of affiliation
Ryota Aoki	Ichiritsu Funabashi High School	FC Tokyo		2003 – Gamba Osaka
Masatomo Kuba	Toko Gakuen High School	Tokyo Verdy		2003 – Tokyo Verdy
Sho Naruoka	Fujieda Higashi High School	Júbilo Iwata		2003 – Júbilo Iwata
Yutaro Abe	Toin Gakuen High School	Yokohama F. Marinos	J1: 3 caps, 0 goals	2003 – Yokohama F. Marinos
Kentaro Ohi	Fujieda Higashi High School	Júbilo Iwata		2003 – Júbilo Iwata
Akihiro Kusaba	Nara Ikuei High School	Cerezo Osaka		2004 – Chukyo University
Takeshi Nakamura	Shiogama FC Youth	Vegalta Sendai		2003 – Chuo University
Toshiki Chino	Nirasaki High School	FC Tokyo		2004 – Ventforet Kofu
Kazumasa Takagi	Kagawa Nishi High School	Sanfrecce Hiroshima		2003 – Sanfrecce Hiroshima
Tomoya Osawa	Teikyo High School	Urawa Red Diamonds		2003 – Omiya Ardija
**Kisho Yano**	Hamana High School	Júbilo Iwata		2003 – Kashiwa Reysol

=== 2003 ===
Player	From	To	Games played	Year of affiliation
Hitoshi Shiota	Ryutsu Keizai University	Yokohama F. Marinos		2004 – FC Tokyo
Shogo Tokihisa	Waseda University	Tokyo Verdy		2007 – Ventforet Kofu
Kei Uemura	Chuo University	Shonan Bellmare		2004 – Shonan Bellmare
Satoshi Hashida	Doshisha University	Vissel Kobe		2004 – Kyoto Sanga
Takuya Muro	Kansai Gaidai University	Tokyo Verdy		2005 – Okinawa Kariyushi FC
Daiki Iwamasa	Tokyo Gakugei University	FC Tokyo		2004 – Kashima Antlers
Yuki Fukaya	Hannan University	Kyoto Sanga		2005 – Oita Trinita
Kazuya Kawabata	Sapporo University	Consadole Sapporo	J2: 1 cap, 0 goals	2004 – Consadole Sapporo
Kazushi Ueda	Nara Ikuei High School	Cerezo Osaka		2004 – Chukyo University
Mitsuyuki Yoshihiro	Hiroshima Minami High School	Sanfrecce Hiroshima		2004 – Sanfrecce Hiroshima
Tsuyoshi Honda	Senshu University	Ventforet Kofu		2005 – Yokogawa Musashino FC
Hayato Hashimoto	Komazawa University	Omiya Ardija		2004 – Omiya Ardija
**Toshihiro Aoyama**	Sakuyo High School	Sanfrecce Hiroshima		2004 – Sanfrecce Hiroshima
Akira Takabe	Toyo University	Tokyo Verdy	J1: 2 caps, 0 goals JLC: 1 cap, 0 goals	2005 – Roasso Kumamoto
**Yuzo Tashiro**	Fukuoka University	Oita Trinita	J1: 1 cap, 0 goals	2005 – Kashima Antlers
Masafumi Maeda	Kansai University	Nagoya Grampus Eight		2005 – Gamba Osaka
Takuya Kokeguchi	Tamano Konan High School	Cerezo Osaka		2004 – Cerezo Osaka
Kenta Togawa	Meiji University	Tokyo Verdy	EC: 1 cap, 0 goals	2004 – Tokyo Verdy
Toshiki Chino	Nirasaki High School	Ventforet Kofu		2004 – Ventforet Kofu

=== 2004 ===
Player	From	To	Games played	Year of affiliation
Shogo Nishikawa	Hiroshima Shudo University	Sanfrecce Hiroshima	J1: 5 caps, 0 goals JLC: 1 cap, 0 goals	2005 – Sanfrecce Hiroshima
**Yuhei Tokunaga**	Waseda University	FC Tokyo	J1: 6 caps, 0 goals JLC: 4 cap, 0 goals	2006 – FC Tokyo
Yusuke Gondo	Dohto University	Consadole Sapporo	J2: 15 caps, 1 goals	2004 – Consadole Sapporo
Kenjiro Ezoe	Momoyama Gakuin University	Cerezo Osaka		2005 – Cerezo Osaka
Yuki Fukaya	Hannan University	Kyoto Sanga		2005 – Oita Trinita
Naoaki Aoyama	Maebashi Ikuei High School	Nagoya Grampus Eight		2005 – Shimizu S-Pulse
Yusuke Tanaka	Toko Gakuen High School	Yokohama F. Marinos		2005 – Yokohama F. Marinos
Ryoichi Kurisawa	Ryutsu Keizai University	FC Tokyo	J1: 6 caps, 0 goals JLC: 3 cap, 1 goals	2005 – FC Tokyo
Takeshi Saito	Sapporo University	Consadole Sapporo		2005 – Toyota Motors Hokkaido
**Keisuke Honda**	Seiryo High School	Nagoya Grampus Eight	JLC: 1 cap, 0 goals	2005 – Nagoya Grampus Eight
**Hajime Hosogai**	Maebashi Ikuei High School	Urawa Red Diamonds		2005 – Urawa Red Diamonds
Takuro Yajima	Waseda University	Kawasaki Frontale	J2: 1 cap, 0 goals	2006 – Shimizu S-Pulse
**Yuzo Tashiro**	Fukuoka University	Sagan Tosu	J2: 10 cap, 1 goals	2005 – Kashima Antlers
Kohei Nishino	Nippon Bunri University	Oita Trinita		2005 – Oita Trinita
Manabu Kubota	Tokyo Gakugei University	Yokohama FC	J2: 4 cap, 0 goals	2005 – Yokohama FC
Keita Sugimoto	Ryutsu Keizai University	Omiya Ardija		2005 – Nagoya Grampus Eight

=== 2005 ===
Player	From	To	Games played	Year of affiliation
Nobuyuki Abe	Ryutsu Keizai University	FC Tokyo		2007 – FC Tokyo
Hiroaki Uchiumi	Kochi University	Tokushima Vortis		2007 – Kamatamare Sanuki
Junya Tanaka	Doshisha University	Vissel Kobe	JLC: 1 cap, 0 goals	2006 – JEF United Chiba
Ryo Nurishi	Waseda University	Tokyo Verdy	J1: 2 caps, 0 goals	2009 – Okinawa Kariyushi
Eiji Naruse	Japan University of Economics	Oita Trinita		
**Jungo Fujimoto**	University of Tsukuba	Shimizu S-Pulse	JLC: 1 cap, 0 goals	2006 – Shimizu S-Pulse
Reiichi Ikegami	Sendai University	FC Tokyo		2006 – FC Tokyo
Atomu Tanaka	Maebashi Ikuei High School	Albirex Niigata	J1: 2 caps, 0 goals	2006 – Albirex Niigata
Ryuichi Dogaki	Kwansei Gakuin High School	Cerezo Osaka		2006 – Cerezo Osaka
Kazuki Sorimachi	Maebashi Ikuei High School	Thespa Kusatsu	J2: 4 caps, 0 goals	2006 – Waseda University
Takuro Yajima	Waseda University	Kawasaki Frontale		2006 – Shimizu S-Pulse
Rui Komatsu	Kwansei Gakuin University	Cerezo Osaka		2006 – Cerezo Osaka
Shingo Akamine	Komazawa University	FC Tokyo	JLC: 1 cap, 0 goals	2006 – FC Tokyo
Shogo Shiozawa	Yamagata University	Montedio Yamagata		2006 – Mito HollyHock
Yasuhito Morishima	Takigawa Daini High School	Cerezo Osaka		2006 – Cerezo Osaka

=== 2006 ===
Player	From	To	Games played	Year of affiliation
Taku Akahoshi	Fukuoka University	Oita Trinita		2007 – Sagan Tosu
Tsuyoshi Kodama	Kansai University	Kyoto Sanga		2010 – Kyoto Sanga
Ryo Nurishi	Waseda University	Tokyo Verdy	J2: 2 caps, 0 goals	2009 – Okinawa Kariyushi FC
Takanobu Komiyama	Juntendo University	Yokohama F. Marinos	J1: 1 cap, 0 goals JLC: 1 cap, 0 goals	2007 – Yokohama F. Marinos
Jiro Kamata	Ryutsu Keizai University	Kashiwa Reysol	J2: 15 caps, 0 goals	2008 – Kashiwa Reysol
Masaki Iida	Ryutsu Keizai University	Tokyo Verdy	J2: 2 caps, 0 goals	2008 – Tokyo Verdy
Tsubasa Oya	Kansai University	Vissel Kobe		2009 – Vissel Kobe
Yasumichi Uchima	Miyazaki Sangyo-keiei University	Oita Trinita		2007 – Sagan Tosu
Junya Hosokawa	Sendai University	Vegalta Sendai	J2: 2 caps, 0 goals	2007 – Vegalta Sendai
Ryota Kobayashi	Takasaki City University of Economics High School	Thespa Kusatsu		2007 – Thespa Kusatsu
Yuji Yabu	Kokushikan University	Kawasaki Frontale		2007 – Kawasaki Frontale
Jun Ando	Kansai University	Kyoto Sanga		2007 – Kyoto Sanga
Daisuke Kanzaki	Fukuoka University of Education	Oita Trinita		2007 – Ventforet Kofu
**Takuya Honda**	Hosei University	Shimizu S-Pulse		2008 – Shimizu S-Pulse
Yuki Kuriyama	Luther Gakuin High School	Sagan Tosu		2007 – Sagan Tosu
Masatoshi Mihara	Luther Gakuin High School	Sagan Tosu	J2: 2 caps, 0 goals	2007 – Vissel Kobe
Shinji Tsujio	Chuo University	Shimizu S-Pulse		2008 – Shimizu S-Pulse
Hiroaki Namba	Ryutsu Keizai University	Yokohama FC	J2: 1 cap, 1 goal	2007 – Yokohama FC
**Kengo Kawamata**	Komatsu High School	Ehime FC	J2: 2 caps, 0 goals	2008 – Albirex Niigata

=== 2007 ===
Player	From	To	Games played	Year of affiliation
Kohei Kawata	Fukuoka University	Sagan Tosu		2010 – Gamba Osaka
Yusuke Tasaka	Aoyama Gakuin University	Kawasaki Frontale	J1: 1 cap, 0 goals	2008 – Kawasaki Frontale
**Kengo Kawamata**	Komatsu High School	Ehime FC		2010 – Albirex Niigata
Hiroki Kato	Ryutsu Keizai University	Mito HollyHock	J2: 4 cap, 0 goals	2009 – Mito HollyHock
Koji Hashimoto	Meiji University	Nagoya Grampus Eight	JLC: 1 cap, 0 goals	2009 – Nagoya Grampus Eight
**Yuto Nagatomo**	Meiji University	FC Tokyo	JLC: 1 cap, 0 goals	2008 – FC Tokyo
Yusuke Murakami	Juntendo University	Kashiwa Reysol		2008 – Kashiwa Reysol
**Daisuke Suzuki**	Seiryo High School	Albirex Niigata		2008 – Albirex Niigata
Ryohei Hayashi	Meiji University	Yokohama FC		2009 – Tokyo Verdy
Masaki Iida	Ryutsu Keizai University	Tokyo Verdy		2008 – Tokyo Verdy
Takamitsu Tomiyama	Yaita Chuo High School	Vegalta Sendai		2009 – Waseda University

=== 2008 ===
Player	From	To	Games played	Year of affiliation
Kohei Kawata	Fukuoka University	Sagan Tosu		2010 – Gamba Osaka
Kazuki Sorimachi	Waseda University	Thespa Kusatsu	J2: 1 cap, 0 goals	2010 – Tonan Maebashi
Hirokazu Hasegawa	Hiroshima University of Economics	Sagan Tosu	J2: 1 cap, 0 goals	2009 – Sagan Tosu
Shingo Kondo	Meiji University	Yokohama FC		2009 – Aries Tokyo FC
Kazushi Mitsuhira	Kanagawa University	Shonan Bellmare	J2: 4 caps, 1 goal	2010 – Shonan Bellmare
Takamitsu Tomiyama	Yaita Chuo High School	Vegalta Sendai		2009 – Waseda University
**Takuji Yonemoto**	Itami High School	Vissel Kobe		2009 – FC Tokyo
Hirofumi Watanabe	Senshu University	Kashiwa Reysol		2010 – Kashiwa Reysol
**Masaaki Higashiguchi**	Niigata University of Management	Albirex Niigata		2009 – Albirex Niigata
Takuma Ito	Waseda University	Kyoto Sanga		2009 – Thespa Kusatsu
Koji Noda	Hannan University	Cerezo Osaka		2009 – Urawa Red Diamonds
**Yu Kobayashi**	Takushoku University	Mito HollyHock	J2: 5 caps, 0 goals	2010 – Kawasaki Frontale
Hironori Ishikawa	Ryutsu Keizai University	Mito HollyHock		2010 – Sanfrecce Hiroshima
**Hideto Takahashi**	Tokyo Gakugei University	FC Tokyo		2010 – FC Tokyo
Naoya Okane	Waseda University	Shimizu S-Pulse		2011 – Shimizu S-Pulse
Shun Nogaito	Yokkaichi University	FC Gifu		2009 – FC Gifu
Kōichi Satō	Yokkaichi University	FC Gifu	J2: 1 cap, 0 goals	2009 – FC Gifu
Yosuke Miyaji	Fukuoka University	Avispa Fukuoka		2010 – Avispa Fukuoka

=== 2009 ===
Player	From	To	Games played	Year of affiliation
**Hideto Takahashi**	Tokyo Gakugei University	FC Tokyo		2010 – FC Tokyo
Naoya Okane	Waseda University	Shimizu S-Pulse		2011 – Shimizu S-Pulse
Yosuke Kawai	Keio University	Shimizu S-Pulse		2012 – Shimizu S-Pulse
Kohei Kawata	Fukuoka University	Sagan Tosu		2010 – Gamba Osaka
**Kensuke Nagai**	Fukuoka University	Avispa Fukuoka	J2: 5 caps, 0 goals	2011 – Nagoya Grampus
Yosuke Miyaji	Fukuoka University	Avispa Fukuoka		2010 – Avispa Fukuoka
Jumpei Kusukami	Doshisha University	Kawasaki Frontale	J1: 1 cap, 0 goals	2010 – Kawasaki Frontale
Dan Howbert	Aichi Gakuin University	Kyoto Sanga		2010 – Kyoto Sanga
Hiroki Honjo	Fukuoka University of Education	Sagan Tosu		2010 – Nagano Parceiro
Hiroaki Okuno	Sendai University	Vegalta Sendai		2012 – Vegalta Sendai
**Junya Tanaka**	Juntendo University	Kashiwa Reysol	J1: 9 caps, 0 goals	2010 – Kashiwa Reysol
Kei Nakano	Kochi University	Ehime FC		2010 – Montedio Yamagata
Tomohiro Yamauchi	Tokai Gakuen University	FC Gifu		2010 – FC Gifu
Tomoya Ugajin	Ryutsu Keizai University	Urawa Red Diamonds		2010 – Urawa Red Diamonds
Kazushi Mitsuhira	Kanagawa University	Shonan Bellmare		2010 – Shonan Bellmare
Takuya Matsumoto	Juntendo University	Shonan Bellmare		2011 – Shonan Bellmare

=== 2010 ===
Player	From	To	Games played	Year of affiliation
Takuya Matsumoto	Juntendo University	Shonan Bellmare	J1: 1 cap, 0 goals JLC: 2 caps, 0 goals	2011 – Shonan Bellmare
Hiroaki Okuno	Sendai University	Vegalta Sendai	JLC: 1 cap, 0 goals	2012 – Vegalta Sendai
**Kensuke Nagai**	Fukuoka University	Vissel Kobe	J1: 3 caps, 0 goals	2011 – Nagoya Grampus
Naoya Okane	Waseda University	Shimizu S-Pulse		2011 – Shimizu S-Pulse
Yosuke Kawai	Keio University	Shimizu S-Pulse		2012 – Shimizu S-Pulse
Kohei Kuroki	Saga University	Sagan Tosu	J2: 7 caps, 0 goals	2012 – Sagan Tosu
Yuichi Kubo	Meiji University	JEF United Chiba	J2: 1 cap, 0 goals	2011 – JEF United Chiba
Takashi Kasahara	Meiji University	Mito HollyHock		2011 – Mito HollyHock
Eijiro Takeda	Aoyama Gakuin University	Shonan Bellmare	JLC: 1 cap, 0 goals	2011 – Yokohama F. Marinos
Yuki Saneto	Kochi University	Kawasaki Frontale		2011 – Kawasaki Frontale
Tsukasa Morimoto	Chukyo University	Sagan Tosu	J2: 3 caps, 0 goals	2011 – Yokohama FC
Yuki Kobayashi	Meiji University	Júbilo Iwata		2011 – Júbilo Iwata
**Hiroki Yamada**	Meiji University	Júbilo Iwata		2011 – Júbilo Iwata
Miran Kabe	Yamanashi Gakuin High School	Ventforet Kofu		2011 – Ventforet Kofu
Ryunosuke Noda	Japan University of Economics	Sagan Tosu	J2: 7 caps, 0 goals	2011 – Sagan Tosu
Toru Ushioku	Yamanashi Gakuin University	Ventforet Kofu		
Ryota Nagaki	Chuo University	Shonan Bellmare	J1: 11 caps, 0 goals	2011 – Shonan Bellmare
Takahiro Nakazato	Ryutsu Keizai University	Yokohama FC	J2: 2 caps, 0 goals	2012 – Yokohama FC
**Daniel Schmidt**	Chuo University	Kawasaki Frontale		2014 – Vegalta Sendai
Daisuke Ishizu	Fukuoka University	Avispa Fukuoka		2012 – Avispa Fukuoka
Takayuki Tada	NIFS Kanoya	Giravanz Kitakyushu	J2: 5 caps, 0 goals	2011 – Giravanz Kitakyushu
Shingo Kukita	University of Tokyo	Fagiano Okayama	J2: 4 caps, 0 goals	2011 – Fagiano Okayama

=== 2011 ===
Player	From	To	Games played	Year of affiliation
Kohei Kuroki	Saga University	Sagan Tosu	J2: 12 caps, 0 goals	2012 – Sagan Tosu
Shohei Okada	NIFS Kanoya	Sagan Tosu	J2: 12 caps, 0 goals	2012 – Sagan Tosu
Hiroaki Okuno	Sendai University	Vegalta Sendai		2012 – Vegalta Sendai
**Daniel Schmidt**	Chuo University	Kawasaki Frontale		2014 – Vegalta Sendai
Yosuke Kawai	Keio University	Shimizu S-Pulse		2012 – Shimizu S-Pulse
Daisuke Ishizu	Fukuoka University	Avispa Fukuoka		2012 – Avispa Fukuoka
Takuya Muraoka	Kanagawa University	Shonan Bellmare		2013 – Shonan Bellmare
Yuzo Iwakami	Tokai University	Shonan Bellmare	J2: 1 cap, 0 goals	2012 – Shonan Bellmare
Takuya Maeyama	Kyushu Sangyo University	Roasso Kumamoto		
Ryota Tanabe	Mitsubishi Yowa	JEF United Chiba		2012 – Nagoya Grampus
Kosuke Okanishi	Chuo University	Ventforet Kofu		2013 – Ventforet Kofu
Masahiro Teraoka	Kansai University	Vissel Kobe		2014 – Giravanz Kitakyushu
Hidemi Jinushizono	Tokai Gakuen University	FC Gifu	J2: 16 caps, 1 goal	2012 – FC Gifu
Kyohei Kuroki	Fukuoka University	Sagan Tosu	J2: 1 cap, 0 goals	2012 – Sagan Tosu
Ryota Kajikawa	Kwansei Gakuin University	Tokyo Verdy	J2: 3 caps, 0 goals	2012 – Tokyo Verdy
Shingo Takizawa	Saitama Institute of Technology	Mito HollyHock		2012 – Tochigi City
Naoto Kamifukumoto	Juntendo University	Oita Trinita		2012 – Oita Trinita
Tatsuya Tanaka	Kyushu Sangyo University	Roasso Kumamoto	J2: 3 caps, 0 goals	2015 – Roasso Kumamoto
Dai Takeda	Tokyo Gakugei University	Giravanz Kitakyushu		2012 – Giravanz Kitakyushu
Tetsuji Sugita	Aoyama Gakuin University	Thespakusatsu Gunma		
Shuto Nakahara	Fukuoka University of Education	Giravanz Kitakyushu		2013 – Avispa Fukuoka
Takuya Sugimoto	Nihon University	Gainare Tottori		2012 – Gainare Tottori

=== 2012 ===
Player	From	To	Games played	Year of affiliation
**Daniel Schmidt**	Chuo University	Kawasaki Frontale		2014 – Vegalta Sendai
Tatsuya Tanaka	Kyushu Sangyo University	Roasso Kumamoto		2015 – Roasso Kumamoto
Shuto Nakahara	Fukuoka University of Education	Giravanz Kitakyushu	J2: 5 caps, 1 goal	2013 – Avispa Fukuoka
Takuya Muraoka	Kanagawa University	Shonan Bellmare		2013 – Shonan Bellmare
**Tatsuya Sakai**	NIFS Kanoya	Sagan Tosu	J1: 2 caps, 0 goals JLC: 4 caps, 0 goals	2013 – Sagan Tosu
Yuki Nogami	Toin University of Yokohama	Yokohama FC	J2: 3 caps, 0 goals	2013 – Yokohama FC
Keigo Omori	Fukuoka University	Giravanz Kitakyushu		2014 – Arterivo Wakayama
Seiya Murakami	Sanno Institute of Management	Shonan Bellmare		2013 – Machida Zelvia
Akira Ibayashi	Kwansei Gakuin University	Tokyo Verdy		2013 – Tokyo Verdy
Ryohei Yoshihama	Shoin University	Shonan Bellmare	J2: 3 caps, 1 goal	2013 – Shonan Bellmare
Kazuki Kozuka	Teikyo Nagaoka High School	Albirex Niigata		2013 – Albirex Niigata
Koki Kiyotake	Fukuoka University	Sagan Tosu	J1: 2 caps, 0 goals JLC: 1 cap, 0 goals	2013 – Sagan Tosu
Yuki Yamazaki	NIFS Kanoya	Roasso Kumamoto	J2: 3 caps, 0 goals	2013 – Roasso Kumamoto
Koji Hachisuka	Sendai University	Vegalta Sendai	J1: 1 cap, 0 goals	2013 – Vegalta Sendai
Kyohei Shimazaki	Toin University of Yokohama	Yokohama FC		2014 – Machida Zelvia
**Yoshinori Muto**	Keio University	FC Tokyo		2014 – FC Tokyo
Hirotaka Mita	Meiji University	FC Tokyo		2013 – FC Tokyo
Kyotaro Yamakoshi	University of Tsukuba	Kawasaki Frontale		08.2012 – Kawasaki Frontale
Takafumi Sudo	Heisei International University	Machida Zelvia		2014 – Vanraure Hachinohe
Yuki Yamamura	Meiji University	Mito HollyHock	J2: 5 caps, 1 goal	2013 – Mito HollyHock
Eisuke Fujishima	Fukuoka University	Sagan Tosu		2014 – Sagan Tosu
Yuji Senuma	University of Tsukuba	Shimizu S-Pulse	J1: 3 caps, 1 goal JLC: 2 caps, 1 goal	2013 – Shimizu S-Pulse
Shohei Kishida	Fukuoka University	Sagan Tosu	J1: 1 cap, 0 goals	2013 – Sagan Tosu
Shuho Miyashita	Sozo Gakuen High School	Matsumoto Yamaga		2013 – Matsumoto Yamaga
Koki Matsuzawa	Waseda University	JEF United Chiba		2015 – Vissel Kobe
Shuhei Yamada	Aoyama Gakuin University	Matsumoto Yamaga		
Takeshi Kanamori	Chikuyo Gakuen High School	Avispa Fukuoka		2013 – Avispa Fukuoka

=== 2013 ===
Player	From	To	Games played	Year of affiliation
Eisuke Fujishima	Fukuoka University	Sagan Tosu	J1: 2 caps, 0 goals	2014 – Sagan Tosu
Tatsuya Tanaka	Kyushu Sangyo University	Roasso Kumamoto	J2: 1 cap, 0 goals	2015 – Roasso Kumamoto
**Yoshinori Muto**	Keio University	FC Tokyo	J1: 1 cap, 0 goals	2014 – FC Tokyo
Ryutaro Shibata	Takushoku University	Tochigi SC		2015 – Matsumoto Yamaga
Kazuki Nagasawa	Senshu University	Yokohama F. Marinos	JLC: 1 cap, 0 goals	2014 – 1. FC Köln
Ryota Sakata	NIFS Kanoya	Roasso Kumamoto	J2: 2 caps, 0 goals	2014 – Tochigi SC
Shuhei Akasaki	University of Tsukuba	Kashima Antlers	J1: 1 cap, 0 goals	2014 – Kashima Antlers
Riku Matsuda	Biwako Seikei Sport College	FC Tokyo		2014 – FC Tokyo
Yuto Misao	Waseda University	Shonan Bellmare	JLC: 2 caps, 0 goals	2014 – Shonan Bellmare
Yuta Fujii	Toyo University	Omiya Ardija		2014 – Omiya Ardija
Riki Matsuda	Biwako Seikei Sport College	Oita Trinita	J1: 9 caps, 4 goals JLC: 1 cap, 0 goals	2014 – Nagoya Grampus
Shota Kaneko	JFA Academy Fukushima	Shimizu S-Pulse		2014 – Shimizu S-Pulse
Mitsuteru Kudo	Hannan University	Consadole Sapporo	J2: 5 caps, 0 goals	2014 – Consadole Sapporo
Naoto Ando	Kyoto Sangyo University	Gainare Tottori	J2: 7 caps, 1 goal	2014 – Gainare Tottori
Go Hayama	Keio University	Tokyo Verdy	J2: 7 caps, 0 goals	
Jin Izumisawa	Hannan University	Omiya Ardija		2014 – Omiya Ardija
Yuko Takase	Chuo University	Omiya Ardija		2014 – Omiya Ardija
Hiroshi Futami	Hannan University	Vegalta Sendai	J1: 1 cap, 0 goals	2014 – Vegalta Sendai
Tsuyoshi Miyaichi	Chukyo University High School	Shonan Bellmare		2014 – Shonan Bellmare
Akito Fukuta	NIFS Kanoya	Sagan Tosu	J1: 2 caps, 0 goals	2015 – Sagan Tosu
Renpei Uchida	Kanazawa Seiryo University	Kataller Toyama	J2: 3 caps, 0 goals	2014 – Kataller Toyama
**Shogo Taniguchi**	University of Tsukuba	Kawasaki Frontale		2014 – Kawasaki Frontale
Masataka Kani	Hannan University	Kawasaki Frontale		2014 – Kawasaki Frontale
Ryogo Yamasaki	Fukuoka University	Sagan Tosu		2015 – Sagan Tosu

=== 2014 ===
Player	From	To	Games played	Year of affiliation
Akito Fukuta	NIFS Kanoya	Sagan Tosu	J1: 2 caps, 0 goals JLC: 2 caps, 0 goals	2015 – Sagan Tosu
Ryogo Yamasaki	Fukuoka University	Sagan Tosu	JLC: 2 caps, 0 goals	2015 – Sagan Tosu
Shun Obu	Fukuoka University	Nagoya Grampus		2015 – Nagoya Grampus
Yoshinori Suzuki	Miyazaki Sangyo-keiei University	Oita Trinita		2015 – Oita Trinita
Kenta Tamagawa	Yamanashi Gakuin University	Ventforet Kofu		
Yu Tamura	Fukuoka University	Avispa Fukuoka		2015 – Avispa Fukuoka
Dai Takeuchi	Fukuoka University	V-Varen Nagasaki	J2: 3 caps, 0 goals	2015 – V-Varen Nagasaki
**Shintaro Kurumaya**	University of Tsukuba	Kawasaki Frontale	J1: 2 caps, 0 goals	2015 – Kawasaki Frontale
Takafumi Shimizu	Chukyo University	Júbilo Iwata		2015 – Júbilo Iwata
Shuma Kusumoto	Sanno Institute of Management	Yokohama FC		2015 – Yokohama FC
Toshiya Takagi	Kanagawa University	Montedio Yamagata		2015 – Montedio Yamagata
Kyohei Yumisaki	Fukuoka University	Giravanz Kitakyushu		2015 – Giravanz Kitakyushu
Tomoki Ueda	Kwansei Gakuin University	Kyoto Sanga		
Hiroki Noda	Ohzu High School	Roasso Kumamoto	J2: 1 cap, 0 goals	2015 – Roasso Kumamoto
Hironobu Yoshizaki	Ritsumeikan Asia Pacific University	Vissel Kobe		2015 – Gainare Tottori
**Junya Ito**	Kanagawa University	Ventforet Kofu		2015 – Ventforet Kofu
Naoto Matsuura	Kyushu International University	Giravanz Kitakyushu		
Hiroki Nakada	Niigata University of Health and Welfare	Kataller Toyama	J2: 1 cap, 0 goals	2015 – Kataller Toyama

=== 2015 ===
Player	From	To	Games played	Year of affiliation
Haruki Fukushima	Senshu University	Urawa Red Diamonds		2016 – Urawa Red Diamonds
Hiroki Noda	Ohzu High School	Roasso Kumamoto	J2: 4 caps, 0 goals	2016 – Gamba Osaka
Taiki Nakashima	Fukuoka University	Sagan Tosu	JLC: 2 caps, 0 goals	
Yusuke Nishiyama	Yamanashi Gakuin University	Ventforet Kofu		
Shogo Murashita	Kwansei Gakuin University	Cerezo Osaka		
Kazunari Ichimi	Ohzu High School	Roasso Kumamoto		2016 – Gamba Osaka
Jun Suzuki	Chukyo University	FC Gifu		2016 – FC Gifu
Seiya Fujino	Kyushu Kyoritsu University	Giravanz Kitakyushu		
**Sei Muroya**	Meiji University	FC Tokyo		2016 – FC Tokyo
Ryo Takano	Nippon Sport Science University	Shonan Bellmare		2017 – Yokohama F. Marinos
Ryo Ishii	Chukyo University	FC Gifu		2016 – Mito HollyHock
Takaaki Shichi	Tokai Gakuen University	Matsumoto Yamaga		2016 – Matsumoto Yamaga
Masato Yuzawa	Ryutsu Keizai University	Kashiwa Reysol		2016 – Kashiwa Reysol
**Tsukasa Morishima**	Yokkaichi Chuo High School	Sanfrecce Hiroshima		2016 – Sanfrecce Hiroshima
Kodai Enomoto	Sendai University	Vegalta Sendai		
Yusei Kayanuma	Kanto Gakuin University	Kataller Toyama	J3: 6 caps, 1 goal	2016 – Kataller Toyama
Yasuki Kimoto	Fukuoka University	Avispa Fukuoka		2016 – Cerezo Osaka
Takumi Nagaishi	Fukuoka University	Sagan Tosu		
Ono Cholhwan	Josai International University	JEF United Chiba		2016 – JEF United Chiba
Tatsuya Hasegawa	Juntendo University	Kawasaki Frontale		2016 – Kawasaki Frontale
Cayman Togashi	Kanto Gakuin University	Yokohama F. Marinos	J1: 4 caps, 1 goal	2016 – Yokohama F. Marinos
Yoshiki Matsushita	Hannan University	Vissel Kobe		2016 – Vissel Kobe
Tsubasa Aoki	Juntendo University	FC Gifu		2016 – FC Gifu
Keita Nakamura	Ryutsu Keizai University	V-Varen Nagasaki		2016 – V-Varen Nagasaki
**Daiya Maekawa**	Kansai University	Cerezo Osaka		2017 – Vissel Kobe
Seigo Kobayashi	Kwansei Gakuin University	Vissel Kobe		2016 – Vissel Kobe
Daichi Tagami	Ryutsu Keizai University	Tochigi SC		2016 – V-Varen Nagasaki
Tatsuki Kohatsu	Ryutsu Keizai University	Tochigi SC		2016 – Tochigi SC
Fumiya Hayakawa	University of Tsukuba	Albirex Niigata		2016 – Albirex Niigata
Go Hayama	Keio University	Albirex Niigata	J1: 8 caps, 1 goal JLC: 3 caps, 0 goals	2016 – Albirex Niigata
Shuhei Fukai	Hokuriku University	Zweigen Kanazawa		2016 – Blaublitz Akita
Ryuji Izumi	Meiji University	Nagoya Grampus		2016 – Nagoya Grampus
Ryo Takahashi	Meiji University	Nagoya Grampus		2016 – Nagoya Grampus
Ikki Arai	Juntendo University	Yokohama F. Marinos		2016 – Yokohama F. Marinos
Ko Hasegawa	Nippon Sport Science University	Tokyo Verdy		

=== 2016 ===
Player	From	To	Games played	Year of affiliation
Junki Hata	Tokai Gakuen University	V-Varen Nagasaki	J2: 5 caps, 1 goal	2017 – V-Varen Nagasaki
Mitsuo Yamada	Sendai University	Vegalta Sendai		2018 – Matsumoto Yamaga
Daiki Miya	Biwako Seikei Sport College	Vissel Kobe		2018 – Vissel Kobe
Rai Anda	Sapporo University	Hokkaido Consadole Sapporo		2018 – Iwaki FC
Kentaro Kai	Hannan University	FC Gifu	J2: 1 cap, 0 goals	2017 – FC Gifu
Ryuya Motoda	Kochi University	Mito HollyHock		2017 – Mito HollyHock
Yushi Mizobuchi	Keio University	JEF United Chiba		2017 – JEF United Chiba
Genki Miyachi	Keio University	Nagoya Grampus		2017 – Nagoya Grampus
Kenta Fukumori	NIFS Kanoya	Giravanz Kitakyushu	J2: 2 caps, 0 goals	2017 – Giravanz Kitakyushu
Shohei Takeda	Kanagawa University	Fagiano Okayama		2017 – Fagiano Okayama
Daisuke Kitahara	Tokai University	YSCC Yokohama	J3: 13 caps, 3 goals	2017 – YSCC Yokohama
Akinari Kawazura	Meiji University	Omiya Ardija		2017 – Omiya Ardija
Ko Hasegawa	Nippon Sport Science University	Tokyo Verdy		2018 – Tokyo Verdy
Ichiro Suzuki	Fuji University	Grulla Morioka	J3: 4 caps, 0 goals	2018 – Iwaki FC
Kodai Enomoto	Sendai University	Vegalta Sendai	JLC: 1 cap, 1 goal	2017 – Zweigen Kanazawa
Takahiro Iida	Senshu University	Shimizu S-Pulse		2017 – Shimizu S-Pulse
Takuya Koyama	Senshu University	FC Tokyo	J3: 16 caps, 0 goals	
Tomoya Hayashi	Kagoshima Amigos U18	V-Varen Nagasaki		2018 – Kamatamare Sanuki
Kazuki Saito	Osaka Gakuin University	Cerezo Osaka		2019 – Kataller Toyama
Kanta Tanaka	Biwako Seikei Sport College	Vegalta Sendai		2020 – Kataller Toyama
Yuta Koike	Ryutsu Keizai University	Kashima Antlers	JLC: 1 cap, 0 goals	2018 – Sint-Truiden
Ryo Takano	Nippon Sport Science University	Yokohama F. Marinos	JLC: 3 caps, 0 goals	2017 – Yokohama F. Marinos
Kiichi Yajima	Chuo University	FC Tokyo	J3: 4 caps, 1 goal	2018 – FC Tokyo
Masayuki Yamada	Hosei University	FC Tokyo	J3: 7 caps, 0 goals	2017 – FC Tokyo

=== 2017 ===
Player	From	To	Games played	Year of affiliation
Kenta Isaka	Tokiwa University	Mito HollyHock		
Shuto Kitagawa	University of Tsukuba	Montedio Yamagata		2018 – Montedio Yamagata
Daiki Enomoto	Tokai Gakuen University	FC Gifu		2019 – Nagoya Grampus
Masahiro Hoshito	Sakushin Gakuin University	Tochigi SC		2019 – ReinMeer Aomori
**Hidemasa Morita**	Ryutsu Keizai University	Kawasaki Frontale		2018 – Kawasaki Frontale
**Yasuto Wakizaka**	Hannan University	Kawasaki Frontale		2018 – Kawasaki Frontale
**Kaoru Mitoma**	University of Tsukuba	Kawasaki Frontale		2020 – Kawasaki Frontale
Daiki Kato	Kyushu Sangyo University	Renofa Yamaguchi		2018 – Veertien Mie
Raisei Shimazu	Kokoku High School	Zweigen Kanazawa		2018 – Zweigen Kanazawa
Takuya Shigehiro	Hannan University	Kyoto Sanga		2018 – Kyoto Sanga
Arata Watanabe	Ryutsu Keizai University	Albirex Niigata		2018 – Albirex Niigata
Yoshiaki Arai	Ryutsu Keizai University	Shimizu S-Pulse		2018 – Shimizu S-Pulse
Kanta Tanaka	Biwako Seikei Sport College	Vegalta Sendai		2020 – Kataller Toyama
Temma Matsuda	NIFS Kanoya	Shonan Bellmare	J2: 3 caps, 0 goals	2018 – Shonan Bellmare
Yuki Ogaki	Kokoku High School	Nagoya Grampus		2018 – Nagoya Grampus
Seiji Kawakami	Sendai University	Fukushima United	J3: 2 caps, 0 goals	2018 – Tochigi SC
Seiya Nakano	University of Tsukuba	Júbilo Iwata	J3: 2 caps, 0 goals	2018 – Júbilo Iwata
Ryo Germain	Ryutsu Keizai University	Vegalta Sendai	J1: 1 cap, 0 goals JLC: 2 caps, 0 goals	2018 – Vegalta Sendai
Kosuke Yasuda	Sanno University	Fukushima United		
Daiki Miya	Biwako Seikei Sport College	Vissel Kobe		2018 – Vissel Kobe
Yosuke Akiyama	Waseda University	Nagoya Grampus	J2: 9 caps, 1 goal	2018 – Nagoya Grampus
Shun Yoshida	Hosei University	SC Sagamihara		2019 – Thespakusatsu Gunma
Takumi Nagaishi	Fukuoka University	Cerezo Osaka		2018 – Cerezo Osaka
Kazuki Tanaka	Urawa Gakuin High School	FC Tokyo		
Yoshiatsu Oiji	University of Tsukuba	FC Tokyo	J3: 5 caps, 1 goal	2021 – FC Gifu
Atsuki Suetsugu	Tokai University	Roasso Kumamoto		2019 – Honda Lock SC
Mitsuo Yamada	Sendai University	Vegalta Sendai		2018 – Matsumoto Yamaga
Hirofumi Munakata	Osaka Gakuin University	Gamba Osaka		
Shunta Osawa	Tokai Gakuen University	Fujieda MYFC		2018 – Artista Asama
Hikaru Arai	Ichiritsu Nagano High School	Shonan Bellmare		2018 – Shonan Bellmare
Kentaro Wada	Kyoto Sangyo University	Gamba Osaka	J3: 4 caps, 0 goals	2019 – FC Osaka
Koki Fukui	Nippon Sport Science University	Machida Zelvia		2018 – Machida Zelvia
Yukihide Gibo	Okinawa International University	FC Ryukyu	J3: 2 caps, 0 goals	2019 – FC Ryukyu
Yota Shimokawa	Osaka University of Commerce	Matsumoto Yamaga	J2: 8 caps, 0 goals	2018 – Matsumoto Yamaga

=== 2018 ===
Player	From	To	Games played	Year of affiliation
Ryo Kubota	Seiritsu Gakuen High School	Zweigen Kanazawa		2019 – Zweigen Kanazawa
Shuto Watanabe	Tokai Gakuen University	Nagoya Grampus		2019 – Nagoya Grampus
Yuki Okada	Waseda University	Machida Zelvia		2019 – Machida Zelvia
**Tatsuhiro Sakamoto**	Toyo University	Montedio Yamagata		2019 – Montedio Yamagata
Rui Sueyoshi	Osaka University of Health and Sport Sciences	Montedio Yamagata		2019 – Montedio Yamagata
Ken Yamura	Niigata University of Health and Welfare	Albirex Niigata		2020 – Albirex Niigata
Tatsuya Anzai	Chuo University	Tokyo Verdy		2019 – Tokyo Verdy
Hiroto Nakagawa	Kokoku High School	Ehime FC		2019 – Ehime FC
**Kaoru Mitoma**	University of Tsukuba	Kawasaki Frontale		2020 – Kawasaki Frontale
**Reo Hatate**	Juntendo University	Kawasaki Frontale		2020 – Kawasaki Frontale
Kohei Tomita	Waseda University	Kyoto Sanga	J2: 2 caps, 0 goals	2019 – Kyoto Sanga
Toma Murata	Kokoku High School	FC Gifu	J2: 2 caps, 0 goals	2019 – FC Gifu
**Hayato Araki**	Kansai University	Sanfrecce Hiroshima		2019 – Sanfrecce Hiroshima
Takumi Kamijima	Chuo University	Kashiwa Reysol		2019 – Kashiwa Reysol
Daisei Suzuki	University of Tsukuba	Tokushima Vortis		2019 – Tokushima Vortis
**Tsuyoshi Watanabe**	Chuo University	FC Tokyo	J3: 3 caps, 0 goals	2019 – FC Tokyo
Hayato Otani	Kanazawa Gakuin University	Kataller Toyama	J3: 8 caps, 0 goals	2019 – Kataller Toyama
**Yuki Soma**	Waseda University	Nagoya Grampus	J1: 9 caps, 1 goal	2019 – Nagoya Grampus
Yuki Ohashi	Chuo University	Shonan Bellmare	J1: 1 cap, 0 goals	2019 – Shonan Bellmare
Masahito Ono	Meiji University	Omiya Ardija		2019 – Omiya Ardija
Riku Nakayama	Tokai University	Ventforet Kofu	JLC: 2 caps, 1 goal	2019 – Ventforet Kofu
Kaito Oki	Kokoku High School	Renofa Yamaguchi		2019 – Renofa Yamaguchi
Shintaro Nago	Juntendo University	Kashima Antlers	J1: 1 cap, 0 goals	2019 – Kashima Antlers
Katsuya Iwatake	Meiji University	Urawa Red Diamonds		2019 – Urawa Red Diamonds
Daiki Enomoto	Tokai Gakuen University	Nagoya Grampus		2019 – Nagoya Grampus
Shunto Kodama	Tokai Gakuen University	Nagoya Grampus	J1: 4 caps, 0 goals JLC: 1 cap, 1 goal	2021 – Nagoya Grampus
Takuma Shikayama	Tokai Gakuen University	V-Varen Nagasaki	JLC: 2 caps, 1 goal	2019 – V-Varen Nagasaki

=== 2019 ===
Player	From	To	Games played	Year of affiliation
Takayuki Takayasu	Kokoku High School	Zweigen Kanazawa	J2: 1 cap, 0 goals	2020 – Zweigen Kanazawa
Tatsuya Tabira	Kobe Koryo Gakuen High School	Cerezo Osaka		2020 – Cerezo Osaka
Kyoji Kutsuna	Biwako Seikei Sport College	Ehime FC		2020 – Ehime FC
Yuki Yamamoto	Kwansei Gakuin University	Gamba Osaka		2020 – Gamba Osaka
Kenta Matsumoto	Toyo University	Kashiwa Reysol		2020 – Kashiwa Reysol
Ibuki Yoshida	Sanno Institute of Management	Nagano Parceiro		2020 – Nagano Parceiro
Hotaka Nakamura	Meiji University	FC Tokyo		2020 – FC Tokyo
Teppei Yachida	Teikyo Nagaoka High School	Kyoto Sanga		2020 – Kyoto Sanga
Powell Obinna Obi	Ryutsu Keizai University	Yokohama F. Marinos		2020 – Yokohama F. Marinos
Toshiya Motozuka	Kanazawa Seiryo University	Zweigen Kanazawa		2020 – Zweigen Kanazawa
Daichi Hayashi	Osaka University of Health and Sport Sciences	Sagan Tosu	J1: 1 cap, 1 goal	2020 – Sagan Tosu
Koshiro Itohara	Biwako Seikei Sport College	Gainare Tottori		2020 – Gainare Tottori
Tomoaki Okubo	Chuo University	Urawa Red Diamonds		2021 – Urawa Red Diamonds
Tatsuki Seko	Meiji University	Yokohama FC		2020 – Yokohama FC
Takeaki Hommura	Ryutsu Keizai University	JEF United Chiba	J2: 1 cap, 0 goals	2020 – JEF United Chiba
Keisuke Nishimura	Senshu University	Omiya Ardija		2020 – Omiya Ardija
**Shunta Tanaka**	Osaka University of Health and Sport Sciences	Hokkaido Consadole Sapporo		2020 – Hokkaido Consadole Sapporo
Tomoya Miki	Kanto Gakuin University	JEF United Chiba	J2: 9 caps, 1 goal	2020 – JEF United Chiba
Yusuke Matsuo	Sendai University	Yokohama FC	J2: 21 caps, 6 goals	2020 – Yokohama FC
Koki Tachi	Nihon University	Shonan Bellmare		2020 – Shonan Bellmare
Zain Issaka	Toin University of Yokohama	Kawasaki Frontale		2020 – Kawasaki Frontale
Junya Takahashi	Komazawa University	Montedio Yamagata		2020 – Montedio Yamagata
Shuto Abe	Meiji University	FC Tokyo	J1: 1 cap, 0 goals J3: 4 caps, 0 goals JLC: 1 cap, 0 goals	2020 – FC Tokyo
Ryotaro Nakamura	Chuo University	Ventforet Kofu		2020 – Ventforet Kofu
Daiki Nakashio	Rissho University	Ventforet Kofu		2020 – Ventforet Kofu
Kento Haneda	Kansai University	Oita Trinita	J1: 1 cap, 0 goals	2020 – Oita Trinita
**Reo Hatate**	Juntendo University	Kawasaki Frontale	J1: 1 cap, 0 goals	2020 – Kawasaki Frontale
**Kaoru Mitoma**	University of Tsukuba	Kawasaki Frontale	JLC: 1 cap, 0 goals	2020 – Kawasaki Frontale
Haruki Mitsuda	Chuo University	Matsumoto Yamaga	JLC: 1 cap, 0 goals	2020 – Matsumoto Yamaga
Tetsushi Yamakawa	University of Tsukuba	Vissel Kobe		2020 – Vissel Kobe
Tomoki Takamine	University of Tsukuba	Hokkaido Consadole Sapporo	JLC: 2 caps, 0 goals	2020 – Hokkaido Consadole Sapporo
Kazuya Konno	Hosei University	FC Tokyo	J3: 4 caps, 0 goals	2020 – FC Tokyo
Takuro Kaneko	Nihon University	Hokkaido Consadole Sapporo	J3: 6 caps, 0 goals JLC: 8 caps, 1 goal	2020 – Hokkaido Consadole Sapporo
Jun Nishikawa	Toko Gakuen High School	Cerezo Osaka	J1: 1 cap, 0 goals J3: 1 cap, 0 goals JLC: 2 caps, 0 goals	2020 – Cerezo Osaka
Yamato Wakatsuki	Kiryu Daiichi High School	Shonan Bellmare	J1: 1 cap, 0 goals JLC: 1 cap, 0 goals JLC/CSC: 1 cap, 0 goals	2020 – Shonan Bellmare
**Ayase Ueda**	Hosei University	Kashima Antlers	J1: 13 caps, 4 goals JLC: 2 caps, 0 goals	2021 – Kashima Antlers
Ken Yamura	Niigata University of Health and Welfare	Albirex Niigata	J2: 1 cap, 0 goals	2020 – Albirex Niigata
Shunto Kodama	Tokai Gakuen University	Nagoya Grampus	JLC: 1 cap, 0 goals	2021 – Nagoya Grampus
Keisuke Kurokawa	Kansai University	Gamba Osaka	J1: 1 cap, 0 goals JLC: 2 caps, 0 goals	2020 – Gamba Osaka

=== 2020 ===
Player	From	To	Games played	Year of affiliation
Yuta Miyamoto	Ryutsu Keizai University	Urawa Red Diamonds		2022 – Urawa Red Diamonds
Hiroki Maeda	Tokai Gakuen University	Giravanz Kitakyushu		2021 – Giravanz Kitakyushu
Wataru Iwashita	Toin University of Yokohama	Roasso Kumamoto		2021 – Roasso Kumamoto
Sota Higashide	Hokuriku University	Roasso Kumamoto		2021 – Roasso Kumamoto
Keita Buwanika	Shutoku High School	JEF United Chiba		2021 – JEF United Chiba
Taiki Miyabe	Hosei University	Matsumoto Yamaga		2021 – Matsumoto Yamaga
Chihiro Kato	Ryutsu Keizai University	Vegalta Sendai		2021 – Vegalta Sendai
Ryotaro Tsunoda	University of Tsukuba	Yokohama F. Marinos	J1: 1 cap, 0 goals	2022 – Yokohama F. Marinos
Kosei Hamaguchi	NIFS Kanoya	Kagoshima United		2021 – Kagoshima United
Tatsunori Sakurai	Maebashi Ikuei High School	Vissel Kobe		2021 – Vissel Kobe
Sota Matsubara	Ryutsu Keizai University Kashiwa High School	JEF United Chiba		2021 – JEF United Chiba
Koya Handa	Sapporo University	Blaublitz Akita	J3: 1 cap, 0 goals	2021 – Blaublitz Akita
Takumi Narasaka	Toko Gakuen High School	Machida Zelvia		2021 – Machida Zelvia
Sodai Hasukawa	Meiji University	FC Tokyo	J1: 1 cap, 0 goals	2021 – FC Tokyo
Hidehiro Sugai	Meiji University	Ventforet Kofu	J2: 2 caps, 0 goals	2021 – Ventforet Kofu
Shunsuke Mito	JFA Academy Fukushima	Albirex Niigata		2021 – Albirex Niigata
Keigo Tsunemoto	Meiji University	Kashima Antlers	J1: 1 cap, 0 goals	2021 – Kashima Antlers
Ryoga Sato	Meiji University	Tokyo Verdy		2021 – Tokyo Verdy
Kyota Mochii	Meiji University	Tokyo Verdy		2021 – Tokyo Verdy
Taika Nakashima	Kunimi High School	Hokkaido Consadole Sapporo		2021 – Hokkaido Consadole Sapporo
Gaku Inaba	Fujieda Higashi High School	Zweigen Kanazawa		2021 – Zweigen Kanazawa
Taiyo Nishino	Kyoto Tachibana High School	Tokushima Vortis		2021 – Tokushima Vortis
Tsuyoshi Ogashiwa	Meiji University	Hokkaido Consadole Sapporo	J1: 4 caps, 0 goals JLC: 1 cap, 0 goals	2021 – Hokkaido Consadole Sapporo
Makito Uehara	Josai International University	FC Ryukyu	J2: 15 caps, 1 goal	2021 – FC Ryukyu
SteviaEgbus Mikuni	Juntendo University	Mito HollyHock	J2: 4 caps, 0 goals	2021 – Mito HollyHock
Yuki Yasuda	Tokyo Gakugei University	Blaublitz Akita		2021 – Blaublitz Akita
Shunsuke Hirai	Kokoku High School	Yokohama F. Marinos		2021 – Yokohama F. Marinos
Sho Hiramatsu	Rissho University	Shonan Bellmare	J1: 1 cap, 0 goals	2021 – Shonan Bellmare
**Atsuki Ito**	Ryutsu Keizai University	Urawa Red Diamonds		2021 – Urawa Red Diamonds
Kazuma Nagai	Kansai University	Kyoto Sanga	J2: 3 caps, 0 goals	2021 – Kyoto Sanga
Masahiro Sekiguchi	Hosei University	Ventforet Kofu	J2: 2 caps, 0 goals	2021 – Ventforet Kofu
Kanta Matsumoto	Toin University of Yokohama	Montedio Yamagata		2021 – Montedio Yamagata
Kanato Abe	Shoshi High School	Montedio Yamagata		2021 – Montedio Yamagata
Tsubasa Umeki	Fukuoka University	Renofa Yamaguchi	J2: 5 caps, 0 goals	2021 – Renofa Yamaguchi
Kento Hashimoto	Keio University	Renofa Yamaguchi	J2: 10 caps, 0 goals	2022 – Renofa Yamaguchi
Rikito Sugiura	Kokoku High School	Zweigen Kanazawa	J2: 20 caps, 0 goals	2021 – Zweigen Kanazawa
Kazuki Fujimoto	NIFS Kanoya	Oita Trinita	J1: 5 caps, 0 goals JLC: 1 cap, 0 goals	2021 – Oita Trinita
Kento Tachibanada	Toin University of Yokohama	Kawasaki Frontale		2021 – Kawasaki Frontale
Motoki Hasegawa	Hosei University	Ventforet Kofu	J2: 2 caps, 0 goals	2021 – Ventforet Kofu
Yota Sato	Meiji University	Gamba Osaka		2021 – Gamba Osaka
Riku Morioka	Hosei University	Júbilo Iwata		2021 – Júbilo Iwata
Yuma Matsumoto	Niigata University of Health and Welfare	Kataller Toyama	J3: 7 caps, 0 goals	2022 – Kataller Toyama
Ryo Nemoto	NIFS Kanoya	Shonan Bellmare	J1: 2 caps, 0 goals	2022 – Shonan Bellmare
Yuya Takagi	Hosei University	Yokohama FC	JLC: 1 cap, 0 goals	2021 – Yokohama FC
Tomoaki Okubo	Chuo University	Urawa Red Diamonds		2021 – Urawa Red Diamonds
Hisashi Appiah Tawiah	Ryutsu Keizai University	Vegalta Sendai	J1: 6 caps, 0 goals	2021 – Vegalta Sendai
Takumi Mase	Hannan University	Vegalta Sendai	J1: 11 caps, 0 goals JLC: 1 cap, 0 goals	2021 – Vegalta Sendai
Yoshitaka Aoki	Takushoku University	Machida Zelvia		2021 – Machida Zelvia
Ryonosuke Kabayama	Kokoku High School	Yokohama F. Marinos		2021 – Yokohama F. Marinos
Tomoki Tagawa	Kokoku High School	Yokohama F. Marinos		2021 – Yokohama F. Marinos
Daiki Fukazawa	Chuo University	Tokyo Verdy		2021 – Tokyo Verdy
Daisuke Matsumoto	Chuo University	Sagan Tosu		2021 – Sagan Tosu
Kenta Inoue	Fukuoka University	Oita Trinita	J1: 6 caps, 0 goals JLC: 2 caps, 0 goals	2021 – Oita Trinita
Tomoya Fujii	Ritsumeikan University	Sanfrecce Hiroshima	J1: 15 caps, 0 goals JLC: 2 caps, 0 goals	2021 – Sanfrecce Hiroshima
Kojiro Nakano	Hosei University	Hokkaido Consadole Sapporo	J1: 2 caps, 0 goals	2021 – Hokkaido Consadole Sapporo

=== 2021 ===
Player	From	To	Games played	Year of affiliation
Yudai Kimura	Kwansei Gakuin University	Kyoto Sanga		2023 – Kyoto Sanga
Riku Iijima	Hosei University	Ventforet Kofu		2022 – Ventforet Kofu
Sho Sumida	Tokyo Gakugei University	Matsumoto Yamaga		2022 – Matsumoto Yamaga
Yuya Tsuboi	Chuo University	Vissel Kobe		2022 – Vissel Kobe
Toya Izumi	Biwako Seikei Sport College	Vissel Kobe		2023 – Vissel Kobe
Tsubasa Terayama	Juntendo University	FC Tokyo	J1: 1 cap, 0 goals	2023 – FC Tokyo
Hisatoshi Nishido	Waseda University	FC Tokyo		2023 – FC Tokyo
Hayate Matsuda	JFA Academy Fukushima	Mito HollyHock		2022 – Mito HollyHock
Yu Hirakawa	Yamanashi Gakuin University	Machida Zelvia	J2: 1 cap, 0 goals	2023 – Machida Zelvia
Itto Fujita	Sendai University	Roasso Kumamoto		2022 – Roasso Kumamoto
Taiyo Namazuta	Sendai University	Kamatamare Sanuki	J3: 10 caps, 0 goals	2022 – Kamatamare Sanuki
Kohei Takahashi	Sapporo University	AC Nagano Parceiro	J3: 2 caps, 0 goals	2022 – AC Nagano Parceiro
Akira Yamauchi	Tokai Gakuen University	FC Gifu		2022 – FC Gifu
Motoki Ohara	Tokai Gakuen University	Ehime FC	J2: 7 caps, 1 goal	2022 – Ehime FC
Kodai Yamauchi	Nihon University	Ventforet Kofu		2022 – Ventforet Kofu
Ren Kato	Meiji University	Tokyo Verdy		2022 – Tokyo Verdy
Sora Ogawa	Osaka University of Health and Sport Sciences	Ehime FC	J2: 1 cap, 0 goals	2022 – Ehime FC
Taku Kamikawa	Waseda University	Fukushima United		2022 – Fukushima United
Kenshin Takagishi	Chuo University	Mito HollyHock		2022 – Mito HollyHock
Reiju Tsuruno	Fukuoka University	Avispa Fukuoka		2023 – Avispa Fukuoka
Kodai Mori	Biwako Seikei Sport College	Tokushima Vortis		2022 – Tokushima Vortis
Kaito Abe	Fukuoka University	Roasso Kumamoto	J3: 1 cap, 0 goals	2022 – Roasso Kumamoto
Kengo Kuroki	Takushoku University	Zweigen Kanazawa		2022 – Zweigen Kanazawa
Keito Kawamura	Nippon Sport Science University	Tokyo Verdy		2022 – Tokyo Verdy
Yuto Nagamine	Takushoku University	Zweigen Kanazawa	J2: 15 caps, 0 goals	2022 – Zweigen Kanazawa
Hiroto Yamami	Kwansei Gakuin University	Gamba Osaka	J1: 5 caps, 1 goal JLC: 2 caps, 1 goal	2022 – Gamba Osaka
Ryusei Nose	Sapporo University	Vanraure Hachinohe	J3: 7 caps, 0 goals	2022 – Vanraure Hachinohe
Rui Yokoyama	Toyo University	Montedio Yamagata		2022 – Montedio Yamagata
Yuhi Murakami	Kanto Gakuin University	Yokohama F. Marinos		2023 – Yokohama F. Marinos
Tetsuyuki Inami	Meiji University	Tokyo Verdy		2022 – Tokyo Verdy
Hiroto Taniguchi	Kokushikan University	Tokyo Verdy		2022 – Tokyo Verdy
Takuto Kato	University of Tsukuba	Kashiwa Reysol		2022 – Kashiwa Reysol
Eugene Fukui	Aioi Gakuin High School	Kamatamare Sanuki	J3: 7 caps, 0 goals	2022 – Kamatamare Sanuki
Tomoki Kondo	Nihon University	Yokohama FC	J1: 2 caps, 0 goals	2023 – Yokohama FC
Sota Miura	Nippon Sport Science University	Ventforet Kofu		2023 – Ventforet Kofu
Tojiro Kubo	Chukyo University	Fujieda MYFC	J3: 6 caps, 2 goals	2022 – Fujieda MYFC
Shuto Okaniwa	Meiji University	FC Tokyo	J1: 1 cap, 0 goals JLC: 1 cap, 0 goals	2022 – FC Tokyo
Kazuyoshi Shimabuku	Niigata University of Health and Welfare	Albirex Niigata	J1: 2 caps, 0 goals	2022 – Albirex Niigata
Kazuki Tanaka	Hosei University	Kyoto Sanga		2022 – Kyoto Sanga
Taiga Son	Rissho University	Sagan Tosu	JLC: 1 cap, 0 goals	2022 – Sagan Tosu
Daiki Sato	Hosei University	Machida Zelvia	J2: 1 cap, 0 goals	2022 – Machida Zelvia
Yuki Hayasaka	Toin University of Yokohama	Kawasaki Frontale		2022 – Kawasaki Frontale
Koki Gotoda	Aoyama Gakuin University	Mito HollyHock	J2: 3 caps, 0 goals	2022 – Mito HollyHock
Reon Yamahara	University of Tsukuba	Shimizu S-Pulse	J1: 5 caps, 0 goals	2022 – Shimizu S-Pulse
Ryo Tabei	Hosei University	Yokohama FC		2022 – Yokohama FC
Hiromu Tanaka	Rissho University	Hokkaido Consadole Sapporo	JLC: 3 caps, 0 goals	2022 – Hokkaido Consadole Sapporo
Masato Igarashi	NIFS Kanoya	Tochigi SC	J2: 3 caps, 0 goals	2022 – Tochigi SC
Seiya Inoue	Konan University	Avispa Fukuoka		2022 – Avispa Fukuoka
Taishi Semba	Ryutsu Keizai University	Sanfrecce Hiroshima		2022 – Sanfrecce Hiroshima
**Makoto Mitsuta**	Ryutsu Keizai University	Sanfrecce Hiroshima		2022 – Sanfrecce Hiroshima
Takumi Kato	Waseda University	Shimizu S-Pulse		2022 – Shimizu S-Pulse
Kodai Minoda	Hosei University	Shonan Bellmare		2022 – Shonan Bellmare
Shunya Suzuki	Waseda University	Omiya Ardija	J2: 1 cap, 0 goals	2023 – Omiya Ardija
Shinya Utsumoto	Miyazaki Sangyo-keiei University	Oita Trinita	JLC: 1 cap, 0 goals	2022 – Oita Trinita
Anton Burns	Taisei High School	Machida Zelvia		2022 – Machida Zelvia
Ryo Nemoto	NIFS Kanoya	Shonan Bellmare	J1: 1 cap, 0 goals JLC: 3 caps, 1 goal	2022 – Shonan Bellmare
Kento Hashimoto	Keio University	Renofa Yamaguchi	J2: 8 caps, 1 goal	2022 – Renofa Yamaguchi
Yuta Miyamoto	Ryutsu Keizai University	Urawa Red Diamonds		2022 – Urawa Red Diamonds
Renji Matsui	Hosei University	Kawasaki Frontale		2022 – Kawasaki Frontale
Yuma Matsumoto	Niigata University of Health and Welfare	Kataller Toyama		2022 – Kataller Toyama

=== 2022 ===
Player	From	To	Games played	Year of affiliation
Reiju Tsuruno	Fukuoka University	Avispa Fukuoka		2023 – Avispa Fukuoka
Yuta Arai	Shohei High School	FC Tokyo	JLC: 3 caps, 0 goals	2023 – FC Tokyo
Tsubasa Terayama	Juntendo University	FC Tokyo		2023 – FC Tokyo
Hisatoshi Nishido	Waseda University	FC Tokyo		2023 – FC Tokyo
Ibuki Konno	Hosei University	Gamba Osaka		2024 – Gamba Osaka
Hiroto Uemura	Waseda University	Júbilo Iwata		2024 − Júbilo Iwata
Riku Ochiai	Tokyo International University	Kashiwa Reysol	JLC: 4 caps, 0 goals	2023 – Kashiwa Reysol
Shin Yamada	Toin University of Yokohama	Kawasaki Frontale	JLC: 1 cap, 0 goals	2023 – Kawasaki Frontale
Yudai Kimura	Kwansei Gakuin University	Kyoto Sanga	J1: 7 caps, 0 goals JLC: 1 cap, 1 goal	2023 – Kyoto Sanga
Kyota Sakakibara	Rissho University	Nagoya Grampus		2024 − Nagoya Grampus
Dai Hirase	Waseda University	Sagan Tosu	J1: 1 cap, 0 goals	2023 – Sagan Tosu
Shuto Nakano	Toin University of Yokohama	Sanfrecce Hiroshima	J1: 1 cap, 0 goals	2023 – Sanfrecce Hiroshima
Taichi Yamasaki	Juntendo University	Sanfrecce Hiroshima		2023 – Sanfrecce Hiroshima
Taketo Ochiai	Hosei University	Shimizu S-Pulse		2023 – Shimizu S-Pulse
Sena Saito	Ryutsu Keizai University	Shimizu S-Pulse		2023 – Shimizu S-Pulse
Kakeru Yamauchi	University of Tsukuba	Vissel Kobe		2024 – Vissel Kobe
Toya Izumi	Biwako Seikei Sport College	Vissel Kobe		2023 – Vissel Kobe
Takuto Kimura	Meiji University	Yokohama F. Marinos		2023 – Yokohama F. Marinos
Yuhi Murakami	Kanto Gakuen University	Yokohama F. Marinos	JLC: 1 cap, 0 goals	2023 – Yokohama F. Marinos
Ryota Takada	Hannan University	Blaublitz Akita	J2: 2 caps, 0 goals	2023 – Blaublitz Akita
Hiiro Komori	Niigata University of Health and Welfare	JEF United Chiba	J2: 2 caps, 0 goals	2023 – JEF United Chiba
Yu Hirakawa	Yamanashi Gakuin University	Machida Zelvia	J2: 17 caps, 2 goals	2023 – Machida Zelvia
Soichiro Fukaminato	Rissho University	Machida Zelvia		2023 – Machida Zelvia
Shimon Teranuma	Toin University of Yokohama	Mito HollyHock	J2: 2 caps, 0 goals	2023 – Mito HollyHock
Taiju Yoshida	Yamanashi Gakuin University	Montedio Yamagata	J2: 1 cap, 0 goals	2023 – Montedio Yamagata
Yusuke Matsuo	Kansai University	Oita Trinita		2023 – Oita Trinita
Shunya Suzuki	Waseda University	Omiya Ardija		2023 – Omiya Ardija
Fumiya Takayanagi	Toyo University	Omiya Ardija	J2: 1 cap, 0 goals	2023 – Omiya Ardija
Keisuke Muroi	Toyo University	Omiya Ardija	J2: 1 cap, 0 goals	2023 – Omiya Ardija
Shun Osaki	Fukuoka University	Roasso Kumamoto		2023 – Roasso Kumamoto
Kazuya Noyori	Osaka University of Health and Sport Sciences	Renofa Yamaguchi		2023 – Renofa Yamaguchi
Wataru Hiramatsu	Rissho University	Tochigi SC	J2: 2 caps, 0 goals	2023 – Tochigi SC
Kosuke Sagawa	Tokyo International University	Tokyo Verdy		2023 – Tokyo Verdy
Haruki Shirai	Hosei University	V-Varen Nagasaki	J2: 8 caps, 1 goal	2023 – V-Varen Nagasaki
George Onaiwu	Niigata University of Health and Welfare	Vegalta Sendai	J2: 1 cap, 0 goals	2023 – Vegalta Sendai
Ryunosuke Sugawara	Sanno Institute of Management	Vegalta Sendai		2023 – Vegalta Sendai
Sota Miura	Nippon Sport Science University	Ventforet Kofu	J2: 5 caps, 0 goals	2023 – Ventforet Kofu
Hayata Mizuno	Toin University of Yokohama	Ventforet Kofu		2023 – Ventforet Kofu
Tomoki Kondo	Nihon University	Yokohama FC	J2: 9 caps, 0 goals	2023 – Yokohama FC
Kotaro Yamahara	Tokyo International University	Fujieda MYFC		2023 – Fujieda MYFC
Yosei Ozeki	Toin University of Yokohama	Fujieda MYFC		2023 – Fujieda MYFC
Kento Awano	Sendai University	Fukushima United	J3: 10 caps, 0 goals	2023 – Fukushima United
Asahi Haga	Sakushin Gakuin University	Iwaki FC		2023 – Iwaki FC
Takumi Yamaguchi	NIFS Kanoya	Kagoshima United	J3: 2 caps, 0 goals	2023 – Kagoshima United
Gentaro Yoshida	Shikoku Gakuin University	Kamatamare Sanuki	J3: 14 caps, 0 goals	2023 – Kamatamare Sanuki
Mao Hamana	Matsumoto University	Matsumoto Yamaga	J3: 3 caps, 0 goals	2023 – Matsumoto Yamaga
Keisuke Ito	Toyo University	SC Sagamihara	J3: 2 caps, 1 goal	2023 – SC Sagamihara
Taira Maeda	Toyo University	SC Sagamihara	J3: 1 cap, 0 goals	2023 – SC Sagamihara

=== 2023 ===
Player	From	To	Games played	Year of affiliation
Hayato Inamura	Toyo University	Albirex Niigata		2025 – Albirex Niigata
Riita Mori	Waseda University	Albirex Niigata		2024 – Albirex Niigata
Masato Shigemi	Fukuoka University	Avispa Fukuoka	J1: 5 caps, 0 goals JLC: 2 caps, 0 goals	2024 – Avispa Fukuoka
Kazuaki Suganuma	Fukuoka University	Avispa Fukuoka		2024 – Avispa Fukuoka
Kengo Furuyama	Osaka University HSS	Cerezo Osaka		2025 – Fagiano Okayama
Hayato Okuda	Momoyama Gakuin University	Cerezo Osaka	JLC: 1 cap, 0 goals	2024 – Cerezo Osaka
Shuma Kido	Osaka University HSS	Hokkaido Consadole Sapporo	JLC: 3 caps, 0 goals	2024 – Hokkaido Consadole Sapporo
Yamato Okada	Fukuoka University	Hokkaido Consadole Sapporo	JLC: 3 caps, 0 goals	2024 – Hokkaido Consadole Sapporo
Ibuki Konno	Hosei University	Gamba Osaka		2024 – Gamba Osaka
Rin Mito	Kwansei Gakuin University	Gamba Osaka		2024 – Gamba Osaka
Taisei Kuwata	Chukyo University	Kashiwa Reysol		2025 – Kashiwa Reysol
Hiroki Sekine	Takushoku University	Kashiwa Reysol	JLC: 1 cap, 0 goals	2025 – Kashiwa Reysol
Hinata Yamauchi	Toin University of Yokohama	Kawasaki Frontale		2024 – Kawasaki Frontale
Ryuma Nakano	Ritsumeikan University	Kyoto Sanga	JLC: 1 cap, 0 goals	2025 – Kyoto Sanga
Kyota Sakakibara	Rissho University	Nagoya Grampus	JLC: 1 cap, 0 goals	2024 – Nagoya Grampus
Ken Masui	Kwansei Gakuin University	Nagoya Grampus	J1: 1 cap, 0 goals JLC: 1 cap, 0 goals	2024 – Nagoya Grampus
Shota Hino	Takushoku University	Sagan Tosu	J1: 4 caps, 0 goals JLC: 2 caps, 0 goals	2025 – Sagan Tosu
Shiva Tafari Nagasawa	Kanto Gakuin University	Sagan Tosu	J1: 1 cap, 0 goals JLC: 2 caps, 0 goals	2024 – Sagan Tosu
Soma Anzai	Waseda University	FC Tokyo	J1: 2 caps, 0 goals JLC: 2 caps, 0 goals	2024 – FC Tokyo
Naoya Takahashi	Kansai University	Shonan Bellmare	J1: 4 caps, 0 goals JLC: 2 caps, 0 goals	2024 – Shonan Bellmare
Kakeru Yamauchi	University of Tsukuba	Vissel Kobe		2024 – Vissel Kobe
Jo Hashimoto	Kanto Gakuin University	Yokohama FC		2024 – Yokohama FC
Hinata Ogura	Waseda University	Yokohama FC		2024 – Yokohama FC
Soma Sato	Tokai Gakuen University	Yokohama FC		2026 – Yokohama FC
Manato Yoshida	NIFS Kanoya	Yokohama F. Marinos	J1: 1 cap, 0 goals JLC: 1 cap, 0 goals	2024 – Yokohama F. Marinos
Yota Fujii	Iizuka High School	Fagiano Okayama		2024 – Fagiano Okayama
Kohei Kawakami	Toyo University	Fagiano Okayama		2024 – Fagiano Okayama
Ren Asakura	Takushoku University	Fujieda MYFC	J2: 5 caps, 0 goals	2024 – Fujieda MYFC
Shoma Maeda	Tokoha University	Fujieda MYFC	J2: 1 cap, 0 goals	2024 – Fujieda MYFC
Kanta Nagata	Chukyo University	Fujieda MYFC	J2: 14 caps, 0 goals	2024 – Fujieda MYFC
Yuma Kato	Takushoku University	Iwaki FC	J2: 9 caps, 0 goals	2024 – Iwaki FC
Yoshihito Kondo	Nagoya Gakuin University	Iwaki FC	J2: 26 caps, 3 goals	2024 – Iwaki FC
Yuma Tsujioka	International Pacific University	Iwaki FC	J2: 7 caps, 0 goals	2024 – Iwaki FC
Ryota Kuboniwa	Rikkyo University	JEF United Chiba	J2: 1 cap, 0 goals	2024 – JEF United Chiba
Hiroto Uemura	Waseda University	Júbilo Iwata	JLC: 1 cap, 0 goals	2024 – Júbilo Iwata
Kosei Ashibe	Kanto Gakuin University	Machida Zelvia		2024 – Machida Zelvia
Tenshiro Takasaki	Quon Football Development	Machida Zelvia		2024 – Machida Zelvia
Asuma Ikari	Ohzu High School	Mito Hollyhock		2024 – Mito Hollyhock
Hayata Ishii	Josai International University	Mito Hollyhock	J2: 9 caps, 0 goals	2024 – Mito Hollyhock
Seiichiro Kubo	Hosei University	Mito HollyHock	J2: 1 cap, 0 goals	2024 – Mito Hollyhock
Soki Tokuno	Sendai University	Mito Hollyhock	J2: 7 caps, 0 goals	2024 – Mito Hollyhock
Kaisei Kano	Kanto Gakuin University	Montedio Yamagata		2024 – Montedio Yamagata
Jo Soma	Sendai University	Montedio Yamagata		2024 – Montedio Yamagata
Arata Kozakai	Chukyo University	Oita Trinita		2024 – Oita Trinita
Shuto Udo	Chukyo University	Oita Trinita		2025 – Oita Trinita
Kaishin Sekiguchi	Yamanashi Gakuin University	Omiya Ardija	J2: 3 caps, 0 goals	2024 – Omiya Ardija
Kazushi Fujii	Tokai University	Omiya Ardija		2024 – Omiya Ardija
Hiro Mizuguchi	International Pacific University	Renofa Yamaguchi	J2: 4 caps, 0 goals	2024 – Renofa Yamaguchi
Koya Fujii	Chukyo University	Roasso Kumamoto		2024 – Roasso Kumamoto
Yui Inokoshi	Chuo University	Shimizu S-Pulse		2024 – Shimizu S-Pulse
Sen Takagi	Hannan University	Shimizu S-Pulse	J2: 2 caps, 0 goals JLC: 2 caps, 0 goals	2024 – Shimizu S-Pulse
Ryota Tagashira	Toyo University	Thespakusatsu Gunma	J2: 4 caps, 0 goals	2024 – Thespakusatsu Gunma
Taishi Tamashiro	Sendai University	Thespakusatsu Gunma		2024 – Thespakusatsu Gunma
Yuta Arai	Toyo University	Tokyo Verdy	J2: 9 caps, 2 goals	2025 – Tokyo Verdy
Soma Meshino	Kyoto Sangyo University	Tokyo Verdy		2024 – Tokyo Verdy
Malcolm Tsuyoshi Moyo	Hosei University	V-Varen Nagasaki		2024 – V-Varen Nagasaki
Rikuto Ishio	Sendai University	Vegalta Sendai		2024 – Vegalta Sendai
Taiju Ichinose	Yamanashi Gakuin University	Ventforet Kofu		2025 – Ventforet Kofu
Hayato Aoki	Nihon University	Tokushima Vortis	J2: 1 cap, 0 goals	2024 – Tokushima Vortis
Hayate Okizaki	Kanto Gakuin University	Zweigen Kanazawa		2024 – Zweigen Kanazawa
Shigeo Miyawaki	Niigata University of Management	Azul Claro Numazu	J3: 1 cap, 0 goals	2024 – Azul Claro Numazu
Masashi Tanioka	Kansai University	Ehime FC		2024 – Ehime FC
Mio Tsuneyasu	Tokai Gakuen University	Gainare Tottori	J3: 5 caps, 0 goals	2024 – Gainare Tottori
Rei Umeki	Teikyo High School	FC Imabari		2024 – FC Imabari
Yumeki Yokoyama	Teikyo High School	FC Imabari		2024 – FC Imabari
Kazuaki Ihori	Tokai Gakuen University	Kagoshima United		2024 – Kagoshima United
Yoshiki Takahashi	Hosei University	Kataller Toyama	J3: 6 caps, 1 goal	2024 – Kataller Toyama
Shosei Usui	Chukyo University	Kataller Toyama	J3: 4 caps, 0 goals	2024 – Kataller Toyama
Daiki Higuchi	Senshu University	Matsumoto Yamaga	J3: 4 caps, 0 goal	2024 – Matsumoto Yamaga
Manato Hyakuda	Kansai University	Nara Club	J3: 1 cap, 0 goals	2024 – Nara Club
Yuto Kunitake	Kokoku High School	Nara Club		2024 – Nara Club
Kazuki Fukui	Kyoto Sangyo University	SC Sagamihara	J3: 4 caps, 1 goal	2024 – SC Sagamihara
Soya Yumoto	Osaka Sangyo University	Vanraure Hachinohe		2024 – Vanraure Hachinohe

=== 2024 ===
Player	From	To	Games played	Year of affiliation
Hayato Inamura	Toyo University	Albirex Niigata	J1: 12 caps, 0 goals JLC: 7 caps, 0 goals	2025 – Albirex Niigata
Keisuke Kasai	Toin University of Yokohama	Albirex Niigata	JLC: 1 caps, 0 goals	2025 – Albirex Niigata
Yu Hashimoto	Fukuoka University	Avispa Fukuoka	JLC: 1 cap, 0 goals	2025 – Avispa Fukuoka
Kengo Furuyama	Osaka University HSS	Cerezo Osaka		2025 – Cerezo Osaka
Shuma Kido	Osaka University HSS	Hokkaido Consadole Sapporo	JLC: 3 caps, 0 goals	2025 – Hokkaido Consadole Sapporo
Koshiro Sumi	University of Tsukuba	Júbilo Iwata	J1: 1 cap, 0 goals JLC: 1 cap, 0 goals	2025 – Júbilo Iwata
Ryusei Yoshimura	Kansai University	Júbilo Iwata		2026 – Júbilo Iwata
Taisei Kuwata	Chukyo University	Kashiwa Reysol	JLC: 1 cap, 0 goals	2025 – Kashiwa Reysol
Nobuteru Nakagawa	Hosei University	Kashiwa Reysol		2025 – Kashiwa Reysol
Yusei Yamanouchi	Toyo University	Kashiwa Reysol		2026 – Kashiwa Reysol
Ryota Kamihashi	Waseda University	Kawasaki Frontale		2025 – Kawasaki Frontale
Ryuma Nakano	Ritsumeikan University	Kyoto Sanga		2025 – Kyoto Sanga
Kanji Kuwayama	Tokai University	Machida Zelvia	J1: 3 caps, 0 goals JLC: 2 caps, 0 goals	2025 – Machida Zelvia
Ryuki Oiso	Tokai Gakuen University	Nagoya Grampus		2027 – Nagoya Grampus
Cailen Hill	Waseda University	Sanfrecce Hiroshima		2025 – Sanfrecce Hiroshima
Taisei Inoue	Juntendo University	Sagan Tosu	J1: 1 cap, 0 goals	2025 – Sagan Tosu
Soki Tamura	University of Tsukuba	Shonan Bellmare		2025 – Shonan Bellmare
Keigo Watanabe	Toin University of Yokohama	Shonan Bellmare	J1: 1 cap, 0 goals	2025 – Shonan Bellmare
Kyota Tokiwa	Meiji University	FC Tokyo		2025 – FC Tokyo
Yuta Arai	Toyo University	Tokyo Verdy	J1: 3 caps, 0 goals JLC: 2 caps, 0 goals	2025 – Tokyo Verdy
Issei Kumatoriya	Meiji University	Tokyo Verdy		2025 – Tokyo Verdy
Yosuke Uchida	Meiji University	Tokyo Verdy		2025 – Tokyo Verdy
Kenta Nemoto	Ryutsu Keizai University	Urawa Red Diamonds		2025 – Urawa Red Diamonds
Kento Shiogai	Keio University	Yokohama F. Marinos	J1: 8 caps, 1 goal	2024 – NEC; ~~2027 – Yokohama F. Marinos~~ (Note: Shiogai was announced by Yokohama F. Marinos in the pre-season as a new designated player, and accepted a pre-contract offer to fully join Marinos on 2027. However, Shiogai's 2027 pre-contract offer with Yokohama F. Marinos and his designated player registration were cancelled, as he left Keio University and the DSP program to join NEC.)
Kosei Suwama	University of Tsukuba	Yokohama F. Marinos		2026 – Yokohama F. Marinos
Kazuya Kanazawa	Doshisha University	Ehime FC		2025 – Ehime FC
Hiroshi Muto	Chukyo University	Ehime FC		2026 – Ehime FC
Kaito Fujii	Ryutsu Keizai University	Fagiano Okayama		2025 – Fagiano Okayama
Yoko Iesaka	Chuo University	Fagiano Okayama		2025 – Fagiano Okayama
Hayato Kanda	Osaka Gakuin University	Fujieda MYFC	J2: 6 caps, 0 goals	2025 – Fujieda MYFC
Taiga Kawamoto	AIE Kokusai High School	Fujieda MYFC	J2: 2 caps, 0 goals	2025 – Fujieda MYFC
Ryo Nakamura	Sapporo University	Fujieda MYFC		2025 – Fujieda MYFC
Sena Igarashi	Toin University of Yokohama	Iwaki FC	J2: 20 caps, 0 goals (Note: Iwaki FC announced on 12 July the permanent signing of Igarashi. He was scheduled to permanently join the team after the end of his four-year period at university. However, he decided to drop out of university with a few months to end his term. He eventually played 12 more matches after the announcement.); JLC: 1 cap, 0 goals	~~2025~~ 2024 – Iwaki FC
Taisei Kato	NIFS Kanoya	Iwaki FC	J2: 4 caps, 0 goals	2025 – Iwaki FC
Rintaro Yamauchi	Sendai University	Iwaki FC		2025 – Iwaki FC
Yuma Igari	Sanno Institute of Management	JEF United Chiba		2025 – JEF United Chiba
Takuro Iwai	Juntendo University	JEF United Chiba	J2: 1 cap, 0 goals	2025 – JEF United Chiba
Kosuke Kawashima	Kansai University	Kagoshima United		2025 – Kagoshima United
Sora Okita	University of Tsukuba	Mito HollyHock	JLC: 1 cap, 0 goals	2025 – Mito HollyHock
Hayata Yamamoto	Senshu University	Mito HollyHock	J2: 15 caps, 1 goal	2025 – Mito HollyHock
Shunmei Horikane	Kanto Gakuin University	Montedio Yamagata	J2: 3 caps, 0 goals	2025 – Montedio Yamagata
Manato Kimoto	Japan University of Economics	Oita Trinita	J2: 8 caps, 0 goals JLC: 1 cap, 0 goals	2026 – Oita Trinita
Ayuki Miyakawa	Juntendo University	Oita Trinita		2025 – Oita Trinita
Shuto Udo	Chukyo University	Oita Trinita	J2: 12 caps, 0 goals JLC: 1 cap, 0 goals	2025 – Oita Trinita
Shun Isotani	Fukuoka University	Renofa Yamaguchi		2025 – Renofa Yamaguchi
Yuya Mineda	Osaka University HSS	Renofa Yamaguchi		2025 – Renofa Yamaguchi
Ryota Ozawa	Nippon Sport Science University	Renofa Yamaguchi		2025 – Renofa Yamaguchi
Ryusei Akimoto	Niigata University HW	Thespa Gunma		2025 – Thespa Gunma
Haruto Yoshino	Rissho University	Tochigi SC		2025 – Tochigi SC
Takumi Yasuno	Teikyo Nagaoka High School	Vegalta Sendai		2025 – Vegalta Sendai
Azuri Yutani	Chuo University	Vegalta Sendai		2025 – Vegalta Sendai
Taiju Ichinose	Yamanashi Gakuin University	Ventforet Kofu	J2: 1 cap, 0 goals	2025 – Ventforet Kofu
Kotatsu Kumakura	Nihon University	Ventforet Kofu		2025 – Ventforet Kofu
Shunsuke Aoki	Hosei University	V-Varen Nagasaki	JLC: 1 cap, 0 goals	2025 – V-Varen Nagasaki
Tenmu Matsumoto	Niigata University HW	V-Varen Nagasaki		2025 – V-Varen Nagasaki
Takanari Endo	Toin University of Yokohama	Yokohama FC		2025 – Yokohama FC
Soma Sato	Tokai Gakuen University	Yokohama FC	JLC: 2 caps, 0 goals	2026 – Yokohama FC
Yuya Nagai	Chubu University	FC Gifu	J3: 4 caps, 0 goals	2026 – FC Gifu
Kiseki Kikuchi	Edogawa University	FC Imabari		2026 – FC Imabari
Shun Mizoguchi	Hosei University	Kataller Toyama		2025 – Kataller Toyama
Gen Matsumura	Senshu University	Matsumoto Yamaga		2025 – Matsumoto Yamaga
Keita Fukui	University of Tsukuba	Omiya Ardija		2025 – Omiya Ardija
Kota Nakayama	Toyo University	Omiya Ardija	JLC: 2 caps, 0 goals	2025 – Omiya Ardija
Rento Takaoka	Nissho Gakuen High School	Tegevajaro Miyazaki		2025 – (England) Southampton
Seitaro Tanaka	Rissho University	Tegevajaro Miyazaki	J3: 4 caps, 1 goal	2025 – Tegevajaro Miyazaki

=== 2025 ===
Player	From	To	Games played	Year of affiliation
Kokoro Maeda	Kanagawa University	Avispa Fukuoka		2026 – Avispa Fukuoka
Sonosuke Sato	Miyazaki Sangyo-keiei University	Avispa Fukuoka	J1: 7 caps, 0 goals JLC: 2 caps, 1 goal	2026 – Miyazaki Sangyo-keiei University
Wigi Kanemoto	Hannan University	Cerezo Osaka		2026 – Cerezo Osaka
Haruki Hayashi	Meiji University	Kashima Antlers		2026 – Kashima Antlers
Rei Shimano	Meiji University	Kashiwa Reysol		2026 – Kashiwa Reysol
Yusei Yamanouchi	Toyo University	Kashiwa Reysol	J1: 5 caps, 0 goals JLC: 3 caps, 0 goals EC: 3 caps, 1 goal	2026 – Kashiwa Reysol
Kyosuke Mochiyama	Chuo University	Kawasaki Frontale	J1: 1 cap, 0 goals	2026 – Kawasaki Frontale
Shuto Yamaichi	Waseda University	Kawasaki Frontale		2026 – Kawasaki Frontale
Ryuki Oiso	Tokai Gakuen University	Nagoya Grampus		2027 – Nagoya Grampus
Haruto Hidaka	Hosei University	Shimizu S-Pulse	J1: 1 cap, 0 goals	2026 – Shimizu S-Pulse
Rinsei Ohata	Hosei University	Shimizu S-Pulse	J1: 2 caps, 0 goals JLC: 1 cap, 0 goals EC: 1 cap, 0 goals	2026 – Shimizu S-Pulse
Gota Yamaguchi	Shohei High School	Shonan Bellmare		2026 – Shonan Bellmare
Tsuna Kominato	Hosei University	FC Tokyo	J1: 1 cap, 0 goals EC: 1 cap, 0 goals	2027 – FC Tokyo
Ryosuke Irie	Juntendo University	Vissel Kobe	JLC: 2 caps, 0 goals EC: 1 cap, 0 goals	2027 – Vissel Kobe
Renji Hidano	Toin University of Yokohama	Urawa Red Diamonds	J1: 1 cap, 1 goal	2026 – Urawa Red Diamonds
Ryusei Sato	University of Tsukuba	Urawa Red Diamonds	EC: 2 caps, 0 goals	2026 – Urawa Red Diamonds
Hayate Ueki	Nihon University	Urawa Red Diamonds		2026 – Urawa Red Diamonds
Kyo Hosoi	Niigata University HW	Yokohama FC	J1: 8 caps, 1 goal JLC: 4 caps, 0 goals EC: 1 cap, 0 goals	2026 – Yokohama FC
Soma Sato	Tokai Gakuen University	Yokohama FC		2026 – Yokohama FC
Kosuke Matsumura	Hosei University	Yokohama F. Marinos	J1: 9 caps, 0 goals JLC: 1 cap, 0 goals EC: 1 cap, 0 goals	2027 – Yokohama F. Marinos
Kanta Sekitomi	Toin University of Yokohama	Yokohama F. Marinos	J1: 5 caps, 0 goals	2026 – Yokohama F. Marinos
Kosei Suwama	University of Tsukuba	Yokohama F. Marinos	J1: 12 caps, 0 goals JLC: 2 caps, 0 goals AFC: 1 cap, 0 goals	~~2026~~ 2025 – Yokohama F. Marinos (Note: Kosei Suwama was scheduled to fully join Marinos in 2026, after his graduation from university. However, he decided to leave university a year before his graduation, consequently being unregistered from the DSP program after just a bit more than a month.)
Yuta Tanaka	Keio University	Yokohama F. Marinos		2026 – Yokohama F. Marinos
Yosei Sato	Osaka University H&SS	Consadole Sapporo	J2: 1 cap, 0 goals JLC: 1 cap, 0 goals	2026 – Consadole Sapporo
Hiroshi Muto	Chukyo University	Ehime FC	J2: 7 caps, 0 goals JLC: 1 cap, 0 goals EC: 1 cap, 0 goals	2026 – Ehime FC
Jinta Miki	Kansai University	Fujieda MYFC		2026 – Fujieda MYFC
Yuto Nakamura	Rissho University	Fujieda MYFC	J2: 1 cap, 0 goals	2026 – Fujieda MYFC
Kiseki Kikuchi	Edogawa University	FC Imabari		2026 – FC Imabari
Ruon Hisanaga	Toin University of Yokohama	Iwaki FC	J2: 4 caps, 0 goals JLC: 1 cap, 0 goals	2026 – Iwaki FC
Kota Kuwabara	Kansai University	Júbilo Iwata		2027 – Júbilo Iwata
Ryusei Yoshimura	Kansai University	Júbilo Iwata	JLC: 2 caps, 1 goal	2026 – Júbilo Iwata
Mahiro Yunomae	Toyo University	Kataller Toyama	J2: 1 cap, 0 goals EC: 3 caps, 2 goals	2026 – Kataller Toyama
Kishin Gokita	Nihon University	Mito HollyHock	J2: 1 cap, 0 goals	2027 – Mito HollyHock
Kota Saga	Rikkyo University	Mito HollyHock		2026 – Mito HollyHock
Kirato Sasaki	Kanto Gakuin University	Mito HollyHock	J2: 1 cap, 0 goals	2026 – Mito HollyHock
Manato Kimoto	Japan University of Economics	Oita Trinita		2026 – Oita Trinita
Takumi Matsui	Hannan University	RB Omiya Ardija		2026 – RB Omiya Ardija
Kenichi Nasu	Chukyo University	Roasso Kumamoto		2026 – Roasso Kumamoto
Yu Nakada	Hannan University	Vegalta Sendai	J2: 12 caps, 0 goals JLC: 1 cap, 0 goals	2026 – Vegalta Sendai
Hokuto Matsuyama	Nippon SS University	Ventforet Kofu	J2: 1 cap, 0 goals JLC: 1 cap, 0 goals	2026 – Ventforet Kofu
Taiyo Yoneda	Nippon SS University	Ventforet Kofu	JLC: 1 cap, 0 goals	2026 – Ventforet Kofu
Jiro Fujita	Kanagawa University	Fukushima United		2026 – Fukushima United
Keita Tanaka	Nihon University	Fukushima United		2026 – Fukushima United
Seitaro Hashimoto	Senshu University	Gainare Tottori	J3: 4 caps, 0 goals	2026 – Gainare Tottori
Kagetora Hoshi	Tokai University	Gainare Tottori	J3: 1 cap, 0 goals	2026 – Gainare Tottori
Kanata Yakabi	Chukyo University	FC Gifu	EC: 1 cap, 0 goals	2026 – FC Gifu
Koki Yumine	Niigata Sangyo University	FC Gifu		2026 – FC Gifu
Ryota Maeda	Saga University	Giravanz Kitakyushu		2026 – Giravanz Kitakyushu
Kosei Yoshida	Niigata University HW	Giravanz Kitakyushu	EC: 1 cap, 0 goals	2026 – Giravanz Kitakyushu
Daichi Matsumoto	Nihon University	Kochi United		2026 – Kochi United
Kosuke Fujieda	Momoyama Gakuin University	Matsumoto Yamaga	J3: 3 caps, 0 goals	2026 – Matsumoto Yamaga
Kota Kaneko	Hannan University	Matsumoto Yamaga		2026 – Matsumoto Yamaga
Tatsuki Miyazawa	Tokoha University	Nara Club		2026 – Nara Club
Yusaku Takusari	Takushoku University	SC Sagamihara	J3: 6 caps, 0 goals	2026 – SC Sagamihara
Ryo Sato	Josai University	Tegevajaro Miyazaki		2026 – Tegevajaro Miyazaki
Ayahi Sakurai	Hannan University	Thespa Gunma	J3: 7 caps, 0 goals	2026 – Thespa Gunma
Haruki Tsutsumi	Tokai University	Tochigi SC		2026 – Tochigi SC
Riku Kurisawa	Hachinohe Gakuin University	Vanraure Hachinohe	J3: 3 caps, 0 goals	2026 – Vanraure Hachinohe

=== 2026 ===
As of 4 September 2026

Player	From	To	Games played	Year of affiliation
Kishin Gokita	Nihon University	Mito HollyHock	J1 (100): 5 caps, 0 goals	2027 – Mito HollyHock
Sota Yamamoto	Kwansei Gakuin University	Kyoto Sanga		2027 – Kyoto Sanga
Kosuke Matsumura	Hosei University	Yokohama F. Marinos		2027 – Yokohama F. Marinos
Ruka Matsumoto	Juntendo University	Iwaki FC		2027 – Iwaki FC
Hayato Hirao	Nihon University	Tokyo Verdy		2027 – Tokyo Verdy
Hibiki Matsuoka	International Pacific University	Sagan Tosu		2027 – Sagan Tosu
Taro Kagawa	Tokai Gakuen University	Kataller Toyama	J2/J3 (100): 1 cap, 0 goals	2027 – Kataller Toyama
Ryosuke Irie	Juntendo University	Vissel Kobe		2027 – Vissel Kobe
Kōsei Ogura	Hosei University	Fagiano Okayama	J1 (100): 6 caps, 0 goals	2028 – Fagiano Okayama
Kota Kuwabara	Kansai University	Júbilo Iwata		2027 – Júbilo Iwata
Yuhi Sakai	Fukuoka University	Avispa Fukuoka		2027 – Avispa Fukuoka
Kokoro Maeda	Kanagawa University	Avispa Fukuoka	J1 (100): 3 caps, 1 goal	2027 – Avispa Fukuoka
Tsuna Kominato	Hosei University	FC Tokyo		2027 – FC Tokyo
Haruya Goto	Fukuoka University	Sagan Tosu		2027 – Sagan Tosu
Ryusei Kitahama	Chuo University	Avispa Fukuoka		2027 – Avispa Fukuoka
Kanade Tsuneto	Chuo University	Kashiwa Reysol		2027 – Kashiwa Reysol
Naru Yasuda	Hosei University	Shonan Bellmare		2027 – Shonan Bellmare
Shusuke Furuya	Tokyo International University	Kashiwa Reysol		2027 – Kashiwa Reysol
Shunki Mukai	Niigata University of Health and Welfare	Yokohama FC		2027 – Yokohama FC
Sota Yamamoto	Kanagawa University	Gainare Tottori		2027 – Gainare Tottori
Kaito Umeki	Tokoha University	Kagoshima United		2027 – Kagoshima United
Kaito Yoshino	Fukuoka University	Sagan Tosu		2027 – Sagan Tosu
Naoya Koike	Hosei University	Júbilo Iwata		2027 – Júbilo Iwata
Sota Iwanaga	Kyushu Sangyo University	Kashiwa Reysol		2027 – Kashiwa Reysol
Futo Nishikawa	Ryutsu Keizai University	Machida Zelvia		2027 – Machida Zelvia
Haruto Tatsukawa	Niigata University of Health and Welfare	Kyoto Sanga		2029 – Kyoto Sanga
Shuto Maruyama	Niigata University of Management	Kataller Toyama		2027 – Kataller Toyama
Hikaru Takahashi	Toyo University	Yokohama F. Marinos		2027 – Yokohama F. Marinos
Ryunosuke Umetsu	Hosei University	Hokkaido Consadole Sapporo	J2/J3 (100): 3 caps, 0 goals	2027 – Hokkaido Consadole Sapporo

=== 2026–27 ===
As of 17 November 2026

Player	From	To	Games played	Year of affiliation
Ryusei Kitahama	Chuo University	Avispa Fukuoka		2027 – Avispa Fukuoka
Kokoro Maeda	Kanagawa University	Avispa Fukuoka		2027 – Avispa Fukuoka
Makoto Tanaka	International Pacific University	Blaublitz Akita		2027 – Blaublitz Akita
Towa Nishimura	AIE International High School	Tochigi City		2027 – Tochigi City
Tsubasa Ito	Kyoto Sangyo University	Tokushima Vortis		2027 – Tokushima Vortis
Shugo Inoue	Momoyama Gakuin University	Nara Club		2027 – Nara Club
Kota Suwa	Konan University	Renofa Yamaguchi		2027 – Renofa Yamaguchi
Shunei Kobayashi	University of Tsukuba	Tegevajaro Miyazaki	JLC: 1 cap, 1 goal	2027 – Tegevajaro Miyazaki
Tsuna Kominato	Hosei University	FC Tokyo		2027 – FC Tokyo
Ryuki Oiso	Tokai Gakuen University	Nagoya Grampus		2027 – Nagoya Grampus
Futo Nishikawa	Ryutsu Keizai University	Machida Zelvia		2027 – Machida Zelvia
Yuhi Sakai	Fukuoka University	Avispa Fukuoka		2027 – Avispa Fukuoka
Ryoya Ogawa	University of Tsukuba	Fagiano Okayama		2027 – Fagiano Okayama
Kōsei Ogura	Hosei University	Fagiano Okayama	EC: 1 cap, 0 goals	2028 – Fagiano Okayama
Sota Yamamoto	Kanagawa University	Gainare Tottori		2027 – Gainare Tottori
Nash Taishi Higakure	Sanno University	RB Omiya Ardija		2027 – RB Omiya Ardija
Ryo Sakurai	Hosei University	Tochigi SC		2027 – Tochigi SC
Kota Watanabe	Komazawa University	Fujieda MYFC		2027 – Fujieda MYFC
Naoya Koike	Hosei University	Júbilo Iwata		2027 – Júbilo Iwata
Kota Kuwabara	Kansai University	Júbilo Iwata		2027 – Júbilo Iwata
Ryusei Nakamura	Toyo University	Yokohama FC		2027 – Yokohama FC
Naru Yasuda	Hosei University	Shonan Bellmare		2027 – Shonan Bellmare
Renji Sanada	Kansai University	Hokkaido Consadole Sapporo	JLC: 1 cap, 0 goals J2: 2 caps, 0 goals	2027 – Hokkaido Consadole Sapporo
Ryunosuke Umetsu	Hosei University	Hokkaido Consadole Sapporo	JLC: 2 caps, 0 goals J2: 9 caps, 0 goals	2027 – Hokkaido Consadole Sapporo
Hikaru Takahashi	Toyo University	Yokohama F. Marinos		2027 – Yokohama F. Marinos
Kosuke Matsumura	Hosei University	Yokohama F. Marinos		2027 – Yokohama F. Marinos
Haruto Tatsukawa	Niigata University of Health and Welfare	Kyoto Sanga		2028 – Kyoto Sanga
Sota Yamamoto	Kwansei Gakuin University	Kyoto Sanga		2027 – Kyoto Sanga
Haruya Goto	Fukuoka University	Sagan Tosu		2027 – Sagan Tosu
Hibiki Matsuoka	International Pacific University	Sagan Tosu		2027 – Sagan Tosu
Kaito Yoshino	Fukuoka University	Sagan Tosu		2027 – Sagan Tosu
Shoya Sasazaki	Tokai Gakuen University	Tochigi SC		2027 – Tochigi SC
Shoei Yamamoto	Osaka University of Economics	Ehime FC	J3: 3 caps, 0 goals	2027 – Ehime FC
Ruka Matsumoto	Juntendo University	Iwaki FC		2027 – Iwaki FC
Ryunosuke Nakayama	Tokai University	Iwaki FC	J2: 1 cap, 0 goals JLC: 1 cap, 0 goals	2027 – Iwaki FC
Kazuki Kimura	Kanto Gakuin University	SC Sagamihara		2027 – SC Sagamihara
Keita Tanaka	Hosei University	SC Sagamihara		2027 – SC Sagamihara
Kishin Gokita	Nihon University	Mito HollyHock		2027 – Mito HollyHock
Yuri Tamura (Note: Tamura's certification was revoked on 15 September 2026 as he joined Mito HollyHock on a permanent transfer.)	Momoyama Gakuin University	Mito HollyHock	JLC: 1 cap, 0 goals	~~2027 – Mito HollyHock~~
Taro Kagawa	Tokai Gakuen University	Kataller Toyama		2027 – Kataller Toyama
Kaito Umeki	Tokoha University	Kagoshima United	J3: 1 cap, 0 goals JLC: 1 cap, 0 goals	2027 – Kagoshima United
Haruki Ozawa	Meiji University	Gamba Osaka		2027 – Gamba Osaka
Hayato Hirao	Nihon University	Tokyo Verdy	J1: 5 caps, 0 goals JLC: 1 cap, 0 goals	2027 – Tokyo Verdy
Kanade Tsuneto	Chuo University	Kashiwa Reysol		2027 – Kashiwa Reysol
Shusuke Furuya	Tokyo International University	Kashiwa Reysol		2027 – Kashiwa Reysol
Reon Tanaka	Tokai University	Urawa Reds		2029 – Urawa Reds
Atsushi Inagaki	Meiji University	Urawa Reds	J1: 3 caps, 0 goals	2027 – Urawa Reds
Yuzuta Sato	Senshu University	JEF United Chiba		2028 – JEF United Chiba
Shu Ikedo	Osaka University of Health and Sport Sciences	Fagiano Okayama	J1: 2 caps, 0 goals	2028 – Fagiano Okayama
Yuan Iwamoto	Chukyo University	Vissel Kobe	J1: 5 caps, 0 goals	2029 – Vissel Kobe
Shota Kimura	Aoyama Gakuin University	Roasso Kumamoto	JLC: 1 cap, 0 goals	2027 – Roasso Kumamoto
Taiyo Nakayama	Kyushu Sangyo University	Roasso Kumamoto		2027 – Roasso Kumamoto
Shunta Ikeda	University of Tsukuba	Kataller Toyama	JLC: 1 cap, 0 goals	2027 – Kataller Toyama
Manato Harada	Nippon Sport Science University	Yokohama FC	JLC: 1 cap, 0 goals	2028 – Yokohama FC
Yuto Tsuji	Kokugakuin University	Shimizu S-Pulse	J1: 2 caps, 0 goals	2028 – Shimizu S-Pulse
Tetsuya Takahashi	Kansai University	Kawasaki Frontale		2027 – Kawasaki Frontale
Rin Honma	Kokushikan University	Kawasaki Frontale	J1: 2 caps, 0 goals	2027 – Kawasaki Frontale
Senri Hosaka	Sapporo University	Vanraure Hachinohe		2027 – Vanraure Hachinohe
Yoshiki Takushima	Meiji University	Tokyo Verdy		2027 – Tokyo Verdy
Aoi Oshita	Toyokawa High School	Shonan Bellmare	JLC: 1 cap, 0 goals	2027 – Shonan Bellmare
Hibiki Goto	Kokushikan University	Oita Trinita		2027 – Oita Trinita
Ryo Toyoda	Meiji Gakuin University	Ventforet Kofu		2027 – Ventforet Kofu
Hokuto Matsuyama	Nippon Sport Science University	Ventforet Kofu		2027 – Ventforet Kofu
Shun Tatemi	Shūtoku High School	Shimizu S-Pulse		2027 – Shimizu S-Pulse
Seinosuke Kimura	Ritsumeikan University	Cerezo Osaka		2027 – Cerezo Osaka
Ren Shiraishi	Niigata University of Health and Welfare	FC Imabari		2028 – FC Imabari
Kei Hagihara	Toko Gakuen High School	FC Imabari	JLC: 1 cap, 0 goals	2027 – FC Imabari
Rita Watanabe	Teikyo High School	Yokohama FC	J2: 1 cap, 0 goals JLC: 2 caps, 0 goals	2027 – Yokohama FC
Shoma Handa	Tokyo Gakugei University	FC Gifu	JLC: 1 cap, 0 goals J3: 1 cap, 0 goals	2027 – FC Gifu
Motoki Imamura	Tokai Gakuen University	Kagoshima United		2027 – Kagoshima United
Jo Ogawa	Chuo University	Vegalta Sendai		2028 – Vegalta Sendai
Tsubasa Sato	Shizuoka Sangyo University	Fukushima United		2027 – Fukushima United
Kento Watanabe	Sanno University	Matsumoto Yamaga		2027 – Matsumoto Yamaga
Shogo Yamamoto	Yamagata Meisei High School	Montedio Yamagata		2027 – Montedio Yamagata
Narumu Ono	Kyoto Sangyo University	Shimizu S-Pulse		2027 – Shimizu S-Pulse
Hiroki Maezawa	Meiji University	Ventforet Kofu		2027 – Ventforet Kofu
Koki Takahashi	Taisei High School	Tokyo Verdy		2027 – Tokyo Verdy
Yuto Ajiki	University of Tsukuba	FC Gifu		2027 – FC Gifu
Soma Furukawa	Ryutsu Keizai University Kashiwa High School	RB Omiya Ardija		2027 – RB Omiya Ardija
Simon Yu Mendy	Ryutsu Keizai University Kashiwa High School	RB Omiya Ardija		2027 – RB Omiya Ardija
Seigo Suetani	Kyoto Sangyo University	Mito HollyHock		2027 – Mito HollyHock
Shuri Kudo	Kokushikan University	Vegalta Sendai		2027 – Vegalta Sendai
Kazuki Matsuda	Juntendo University	Júbilo Iwata		2027 – Júbilo Iwata
Reiji Okadome	Fukuoka University	Renofa Yamaguchi		2028 – Renofa Yamaguchi
Go Nakagawa	Kanazawa Gakuin University	Zweigen Kanazawa		2027 – Zweigen Kanazawa

== Records ==
As of 11 October 2026

Records are based on unique player appearances per institution and per club. Players who held designated special player status across multiple seasons are counted only once.

- Educational institution with most designated special players:
  - Meiji University **(40)**
- J.League club taken on most designated special players:
  - FC Tokyo **(33)**

=== Caps ===
All records below are for while the player was specially designated

- Most J1 caps: **15**
  - Tomoya Fujii (Sanfrecce Hiroshima, 2020)
- Most J2 caps: **26**
  - Yoshihito Kondo (Iwaki FC, 2023)
- Most J3 caps: **16**
  - Takuya Koyama (FC Tokyo U-23, 2016)
- Most League Cup caps: **8**
  - Takuro Kaneko (Hokkaido Consadole Sapporo, 2019)

=== Goals ===
- Most J1 goals: **4**
  - Riki Matsuda (Oita Trinita, 2013)
  - Ayase Ueda (Kashima Antlers, 2019)
- Most J2 goals: **6**
  - Yusuke Matsuo (Yokohama FC, 2019)
- Most J3 goals: **3**
  - Daisuke Kitahara (YSCC Yokohama, 2016)
