= Takuya =

- Gender: Male

Origin
- Origin: Japanese
- Meaning: Different meanings depending on the kanji used

Takuya is a masculine Japanese given name. Notable people with the name include:

- Takuya Asanuma (浅沼 拓也; born 1971), Japanese guitarist and former member of Judy and Mary who performs as "TAKUYA"
- Takuya Eguchi (江口 拓也; born 1987), Japanese voice actor
- Takuya Fujioka (藤岡 琢也; 1930–2006), Japanese actor
- Takuya Fukatsu (深津 卓也; born 1987), Japanese long-distance runner
- Takuya Haneda (羽根田 卓也; born 1987), Japanese slalom canoeist
- Takuya Hara (disambiguation), multiple people
- Takuya Hirai (平井 卓也; born 1958), Japanese politician, member of the Japanese House of Representatives
- Takuya Ide (井出 卓也; born 1991), Japanese actor and singer
- Takuya Igarashi (五十嵐 卓哉; born 1965), Japanese anime director
- Takuya Ishida (石田 卓也; born 1987), Japanese actor
- Takuya Ishioka (石岡 拓也; born 1971), Japanese alpine skier
- Takuya Iwanami (岩波 拓也; born 1994), Japanese footballer
- Takuya Iwasaki (岩崎 卓也; 1929–2018), Japanese archaeologist
- Takuya Iwata (disambiguation), multiple people
- Takuya Izawa (伊沢 拓也; born 1984), Japanese racing driver
- Takuya Jinno (神野 卓哉; born 1970), Japanese footballer
- Takuya Kai (甲斐 拓也; born 1992), Japanese professional baseball player
- Takuya Kida (喜田 拓也; born 1994), Japanese footballer
- Takuya Kimura (木村 拓哉; born 1972), member of the Japanese pop vocal group, SMAP
- Takuya Kimura (baseball) (木村 拓也; 1972–2010), Japanese baseball player
- Takuya Kirimoto (桐本 拓哉; born 1967), Japanese voice actor
- Takuya Kuroda (黒田 卓也; born 1980), Japanese jazz trumpeter and arranger
- Takuya Kurosawa (黒澤 琢弥; born 1962), Japanese race car driver
- Takuya Matsumoto (松本 拓也; born 1989), Japanese footballer
- Takuya Miki (三木 拓也; born 1989), Japanese wheelchair tennis player
- Takuya Mitsuda (満田 拓也; born 1965), Japanese manga artist
- Takuya Miyama (深山 卓也; born 1954), Japanese jurist
- Takuya Miyamoto (disambiguation), multiple people
- Takuya Mizoguchi (溝口 琢矢; born 1995), Japanese actor
- Takuya Muraoka (村岡 拓哉; born 1990), Japanese footballer
- Takuya Murayama (村山 拓哉; born 1989), Japanese footballer
- Takuya Nagase (永瀬 拓矢; born 1992), Japanese shogi player
- Takuya Nishida (西田 拓也; born 1991), Japanese shogi player
- Takuya Ogiwara (荻原 拓也; born 1999), Japanese footballer
- Takuya Onishi (大西 卓哉; born 1975), Japanese astronaut candidate from JAXA
- Takuya Ōta (太田 拓弥; born 1970), Japanese sport wrestler
- Takuya Satō (director) (佐藤 卓哉), Japanese anime screenwriter and director
- Takuya Satō (voice actor) (佐藤 拓也; born 1984), Japanese voice actor
- Takuya Shigehiro (重廣 卓也; born 1995), Japanese footballer
- Takuya Shimakawa (島川 拓也; born 1998), Japanese freestyle skier
- Takuya Shimamura (島村 拓弥; born 1999), Japanese footballer
- Takuya Sugi (杉 卓也; born 1983), Japanese professional wrestler
- Takuya Sugimoto (杉本 拓也; born 1989), Japanese footballer
- Takuya Takagi (高木 琢也; born 1967), Japanese professional footballer and coach
- Takuya Taniguchi (谷口 拓也; born 1979), Japanese golfer
- Takuya Tasso (達増 拓也; born 1964), Japanese politician, governor of Iwate Prefecture
- Takuya Terada (寺田 拓哉; born 1992), Japanese singer, actor and model, currently active in Korean band Cross Gene
- Takuya Tsukahara (塚原 琢哉; born 1937), Japanese photographer
- Takuya Yamada (山田 卓也; born 1974), Japanese footballer
- Takuya Yasui (安井 拓也; born 1998), Japanese footballer
- Takuya Yoshikawa (吉川 拓也; born 1988), Japanese footballer
- Takuya∞, the vocalist for the Japanese band Uverworld
- Takuya Kyokutaisei (旭大星 託也; born 1989), Japanese sumo wrestler
- Takuya Hidenoumi (英乃海 託也; born 1989), Japanese sumo wrestler

== Fictional characters ==
- Takuya Enoki, the main character in the manga series Aka-chan to Boku
- Takuya Morooka, a character in the visual novel Maji de Watashi ni Koi Shinasai!
- Takuya Kanbara, a character in the anime series Digimon Frontier
- Takuya Yamashiro, protagonist of the tokusatsu television series Spider-Man
- Takuya Muramatsu (村松拓哉), a character from the Assassination Classroom manga and anime series
- Takuya Kai, the Main character in the metal heroes series Juukou B-Fighter
- Takuya Uzaki, a character in the game and anime series Little Battlers Experience

== See also ==
- 94884 Takuya, a main-belt asteroid
