= Hiroto Nakagawa =

Hiroto Nakagawa may refer to:

- Hiroto Nakagawa (footballer, born 1994) (中川 寛斗), Japanese footballer
- Hiroto Nakagawa (footballer, born 2000) (中川 裕仁), Japanese footballer
