= Kaito Abe =

Kaito Abe is the name of:

- Kaito Abe (footballer, born June 1999), Japanese footballer for Roasso Kumamoto
- Kaito Abe (footballer, born September 1999), Japanese footballer for Fagiano Okayama
