= Yosei Sato =

Japanese footballer

Yosei Sato 佐藤 陽成
Personal information
- Date of birth: 3 September 2003 (age 23)
- Place of birth: Hokkaido, Japan
- Height: 1.68 m (5 ft 6 in)
- Position: Forward

Team information
- Current team: Hokkaido Consadole Sapporo
- Number: 40

Youth career
- Wakkanai Jr. Eleven
- Wakkanai Minami Junior High School
- –2021: Hokkaido Consadole Sapporo

College career
Years	Team	Apps	(Gls)
2022–	Osaka University H&SS		

Senior career*
Years	Team	Apps	(Gls)
2021, 2025–	Hokkaido Consadole Sapporo	6	(0)
- * Club domestic league appearances and goals as of 13 August 2026

Yosei Sato (佐藤 陽成, Sato Yosei; born 3 September 2003) is a Japanese footballer who plays as a forward for Osaka University H&SS football team, also registered as a specially-designated player with Hokkaido Consadole Sapporo.

== Club career ==
Sato made his professional debut in a 1–2 Emperor's Cup loss against V-Varen Nagasaki.

== Career statistics ==
=== Club ===
As of 7 July 2021.

Club	Season	League			National Cup		League Cup		Other		Total	
Club	Season	Division	Apps	Goals	Apps	Goals	Apps	Goals	Apps	Goals	Apps	Goals
Hokkaido Consadole Sapporo	2021	J1 League	0	0	1 (Note: Appearances in the Emperor's Cup)	0	0	0	0	0	1	0
Career total			0	0	1	0	0	0	0	0	1	0
