= Taiyo Namazuta =

Japanese footballer

Personal information
- Full name: Taiyo Namazuta
- Date of birth: 13 April 1999 (age 27)
- Place of birth: Hasuda, Saitama, Japan
- Height: 1.72 m (5 ft 8 in)
- Position: Midfielder

Team information
- Current team: Kamatamare Sanuki
- Number: 27

Youth career
- –2017: Kashiwa Reysol

College career
Years	Team	Apps	(Gls)
2018–2021	Sendai University		

Senior career*
Years	Team	Apps	(Gls)
2021–	Kamatamare Sanuki	27	(0)
- * Club domestic league appearances and goals as of 23:17, 5 November 2023

Taiyo Namazuta (鯰田 太陽, Namazuta Taiyo; born 13 April 1999) is a Japanese footballer currently playing as a midfielder for Kamatamare Sanuki as a designated special player.

== Early life ==
Taiyo was born in Hasuda. He played for Kashiwa Reysol Youth and studied at Sendai University.

== Career ==
Taiyo made his debut for Kamatamare against YSCC on the 26th of September 2021, coming on in the 68th minute for Kazuki Iwamoto.

== Career statistics ==
=== Club ===
As of 3 October 2021.

Club	Season	League			National Cup		League Cup		Other		Total	
Club	Season	Division	Apps	Goals	Apps	Goals	Apps	Goals	Apps	Goals	Apps	Goals
Sendai University	2019	–			2 (Note: Appearances in the Emperor's Cup)	0	–		0	0	2	0
Kamatamare Sanuki	2021	J3 League	2	0	0	0	–		0	0	2	0
Career total			2	0	2	0	0	0	0	0	4	0
