= Yuma Matsumoto =

Japanese footballer

Yuma Matsumoto 松本 雄真
Personal information
- Full name: Yuma Matsumoto
- Date of birth: 14 November 1999 (age 26)
- Place of birth: Kashiwa, Chiba, Japan
- Height: 1.76 m (5 ft 9 in)
- Position: Midfielder

Team information
- Current team: Tegevajaro Miyazaki
- Number: 23

Youth career
- Kashiwa Russell
- 2016–2018: Shoshi High School

College career
Years	Team	Apps	(Gls)
2018–2019	Niigata University H&W		

Senior career*
Years	Team	Apps	(Gls)
2020–2022	Kataller Toyama	33	(0)
2023–2024	FC Imabari	34	(0)
2024-	Tegevajaro Miyazaki	73	(3)
- * Club domestic league appearances and goals as of 16 August 2026

Yuma Matsumoto (松本 雄真, Matsumoto Yuma; born 14 November 1999) is a Japanese footballer who playing as a midfielder and currently plays for Tegevajaro Miyazaki.

== Career statistics ==
=== Club ===
As of 6 March 2023.

Club	Season	League			National Cup		League Cup		Other		Total	
Club	Season	Division	Apps	Goals	Apps	Goals	Apps	Goals	Apps	Goals	Apps	Goals
Niigata University of Health and Welfare	2020	–			2 (Note: Appearances in the Emperor's Cup)	0	–		0	0	2	0
Kataller Toyama	2020	J3 League	7	0	0	0	–		0	0	7	0
Kataller Toyama	2022	J3 League	26	0	2	0	–		0	0	28	0
FC Imabari	2023	J3 League	0	0	0	0	–		0	0	0	0
Career total			7	0	2	0	0	0	0	0	9	0
