= Takuya Hara =

Takuya Hara may refer to:

- Takuya Hara (footballer) (born 1983), Japanese footballer
- Takuya Hara (baseball) (born 1984), Japanese baseball player
