= Rissho University =

University in Tokyo, Japan

Coordinates: 35.621094°N 139.722936°E

- 立正大学
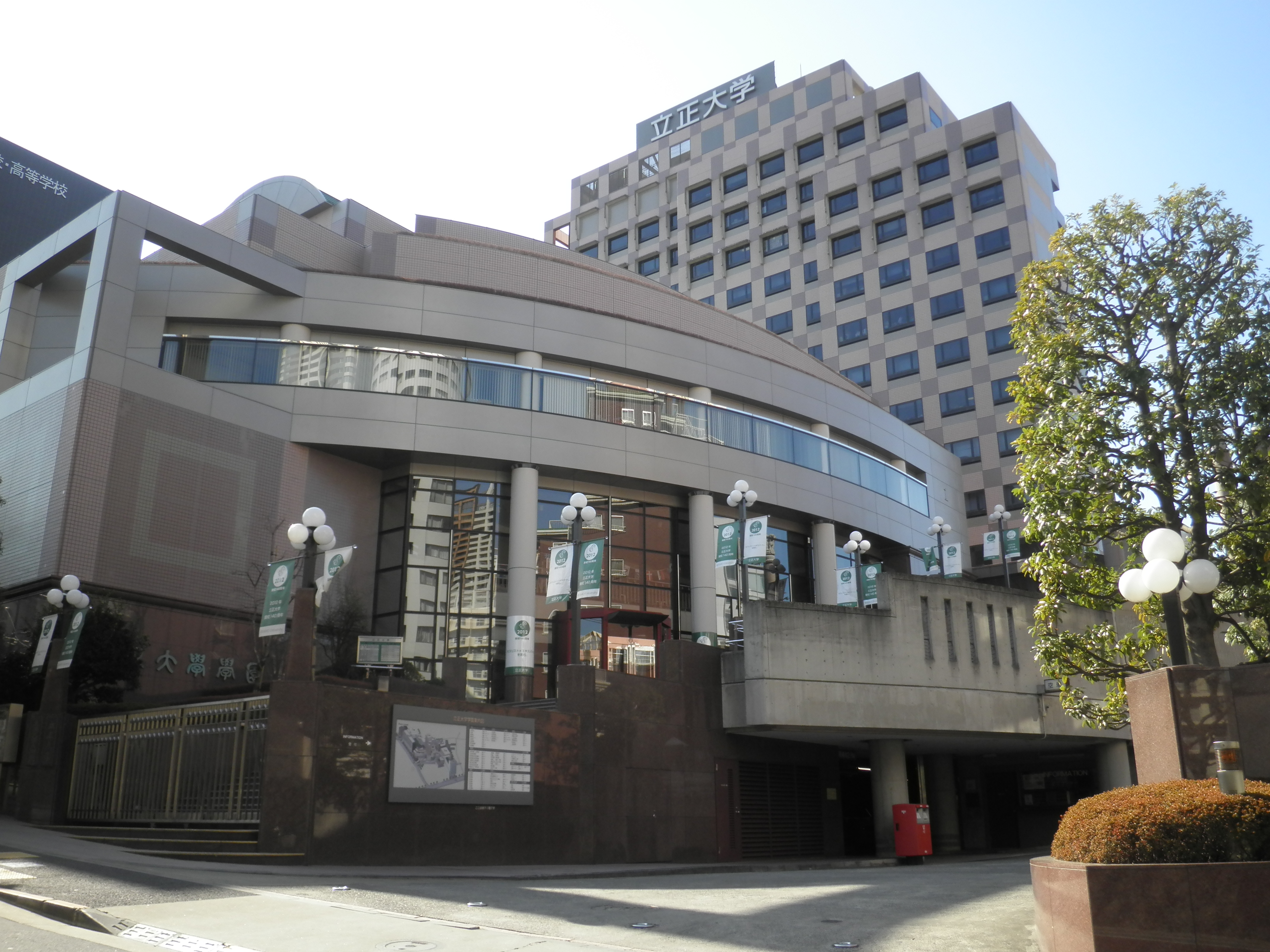
- Motto: 1. Seek truth and show sincerity.; 2. Value justice and reject evil.; 3. Desire peace and serve humankind.
- Type: Private
- Established: 1580
- President: Hiroshi Yoshikawa
- Faculty: 555
- Administrative staff: 242
- Undergraduates: 10,401
- Postgraduates: 223
- Location: Shinagawa, Tokyo, Japan
- Campus: Urban
- Website: ris.ac.jp

Rissho University (立正大学, Risshō Daigaku), one of the oldest universities in Japan, was founded in 1580, when a seminary was established as a learning center for young monks of the Nichiren shu.

The university's name came from the Rissho Ankoku Ron, a thesis written by Nichiren, a prominent Buddhist priest of the Kamakura period. Rissho University enrolls approximately 11,900 students. It has 14 undergraduate departments and 6 graduate school research departments on two separate campuses.

== Campuses ==
=== Shinagawa Campus ===
The Shinagawa Campus is located in Shinagawa, Tokyo. In 1992, the campus was renovated to include a 12-story research building, an administration building, various classroom buildings, a library, and the Ishibashi Tanzan Memorial Auditorium. Courses for juniors and seniors include Buddhist Studies and Letters and Economics, Business Administration and Psychology. The university's research departments for Letters, Economics, and Business Administration are also located on this campus. Approximately 5,900 undergraduate and graduate students study in this campus.

=== Kumagaya Campus ===
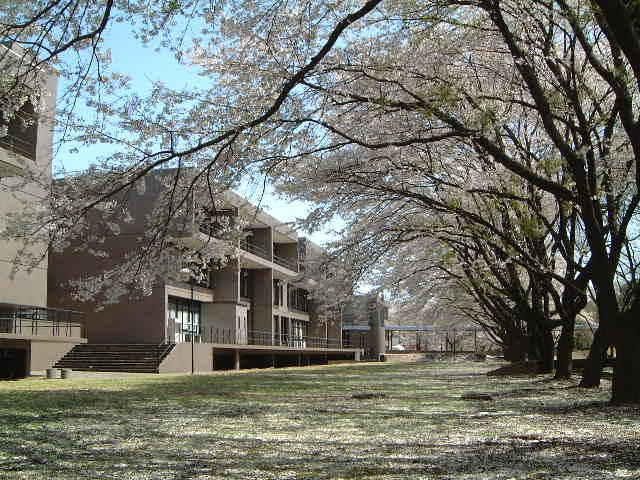
Kumagaya Campus

The Kumagaya Campus is located in Kumagaya City, Saitama Prefecture, approximately 60 km northwest of Tokyo. The Kumagaya campus houses Faculties of Law, Social Welfare and Geo-Environmental Sciences and their research departments, as well as the daytime liberal arts courses for freshmen and sophomores of the faculties of Buddhist Studies and Letters. In 2009, the Kumagaya Campus underwent a renovation.
