= Kaito Abe (footballer, born June 1999) =

Japanese footballer

Personal information
- Full name: Kaito Abe
- Date of birth: 18 June 1999 (age 27)
- Place of birth: Ogōri, Fukuoka, Japan
- Height: 1.75 m (5 ft 9 in)
- Position: Defender

Team information
- Current team: Tochigi SC
- Number: 6

Youth career
- Amagi FC
- Azumano SC
- –2017: Sagan Tosu

College career
| Years | Team | Apps | (Gls) |
| 2018–2021 | Fukuoka University | | |

Senior career*
| Years | Team | Apps | (Gls) |
| 2021–2025 | Roasso Kumamoto | 85 | (4) |
| 2026– | Tochigi SC | 20 | (0) |
- * Club domestic league appearances and goals as of 17 August 2026

Kaito Abe (阿部 海斗, Abe Kaito; born 18 June 1999) is a Japanese footballer currently playing as a defender for Tochigi SC.

== Career ==
Abe joined Roasso as a designated special player. He made his debut for Roasso against Kataller Toyama on 14 November 2021. He scored his first goal for the club against Tokyo Verdy on 9 April 2022, scoring in the 36th minute.

== Career statistics ==
=== Club ===
As of 18 November 2021.

| Club | Season | League | | | National Cup | | League Cup | | Other | | Total | |
| Club | Season | Division | Apps | Goals | Apps | Goals | Apps | Goals | Apps | Goals | Apps | Goals |
|---|---|---|---|---|---|---|---|---|---|---|---|---|
| Roasso Kumamoto | 2021 | J3 League | 1 | 0 | 0 | 0 | – | | 0 | 0 | 1 | 0 |
| Career total | | | 1 | 0 | 0 | 0 | 0 | 0 | 0 | 0 | 1 | 0 |
