= Yushi Mizobuchi =

Japanese footballer (born 1994)

Yushi Mizobuchi 溝渕 雄志
Personal information
- Full name: Yushi Mizobuchi
- Date of birth: July 20, 1994 (age 32)
- Place of birth: Kagawa, Japan
- Height: 1.72 m (5 ft 8 in)
- Position: Full-back

Youth career
- 2013–2016: Keio University

Senior career*
Years	Team	Apps	(Gls)
2017–2021	JEF United Chiba	31	(0)
2019	→ Matsumoto Yamaga (loan)	0	(0)
2020-2021	→ Tochigi SC (loan)	51	(0)
2022	Kamatamare Sanuki	0	(0)
- * Club domestic league appearances and goals as of 18 January 2023, 23:00 (UTC)

Yushi Mizobuchi (溝渕 雄志, Mizobuchi Yushi; born July 20, 1994) is a Japanese former football player who played as a full-back.

== Career ==
Yushi Mizobuchi joined J2 League club JEF United Chiba in 2017.

Mizobuchi officially announced retirement from football in earlier 2023, after 6 years of professional career.

== Career statistics ==
Updated to 7 August 2022.

Appearances and goals by club, season and competition
Club	Season	League			Emperor's Cup		Total	
Club	Season	Division	Apps	Goals	Apps	Goals	Apps	Goals
JEF United Chiba	2017	J2 League	13	0	1	0	14	0
JEF United Chiba	2018	J2 League	15	0	1	0	16	0
Matsumoto Yamaga FC	2019	J1 League	0	0	0	0	0	0
Tochigi SC	2020	J2 League	34	0	0	0	34	0
JEF United	2021	J2 League	3	0	0	0	3	0
Tochigi SC	2021	J2 League	17	0	0	0	17	0
Career total			82	0	2	0	84	0
