= Yoshiatsu Oiji =

Japanese footballer

Personal information
- Date of birth: April 2, 1998 (age 28)
- Place of birth: Tokyo, Japan
- Height: 1.77 m (5 ft 9 1/2 in)
- Position: Midfielder

Team information
- Current team: FC Gifu
- Number: 14

Youth career
- –2016: FC Tokyo

College career
Years	Team	Apps	(Gls)
2017–2020	University of Tsukuba		

Senior career*
Years	Team	Apps	(Gls)
2016–2017	FC Tokyo U-23	27	(2)
2021–	FC Gifu	79	(2)
- * Club domestic league appearances and goals as of 1 January 2026

Yoshiatsu Oiji (生地 慶充, Oiji Yoshiatsu; born April 2, 1998) is a Japanese football player currently playing for FC Gifu.

== Career ==
Yoshiatsu Oiji joined FC Tokyo in 2016. On March 13, he debuted in J3 League (v SC Sagamihara).
