= Naoya Okane =

Japanese footballer

Naoya Okane 岡根 直哉
Personal information
- Full name: Naoya Okane
- Date of birth: 19 April 1988 (age 38)
- Place of birth: Kishiwada, Osaka, Japan
- Height: 1.90 m (6 ft 3 in)
- Position: Centre-back

Team information
- Current team: Okinawa SV
- Number: 5

Youth career
- 2007–2010: Waseda University

Senior career*
Years	Team	Apps	(Gls)
2011–2013	Shimizu S-Pulse	4	(0)
2012	→ Montedio Yamagata (loan)	8	(0)
2014	Tochigi SC	26	(2)
2015–2016	FC Gifu	65	(4)
2017	SC Sagamihara	30	(0)
2018–	Okinawa SV	77	(8)
- * Club domestic league appearances and goals as of 20 February 2023

Naoya Okane (岡根 直哉, born April 19, 1988) is a Japanese football player who playing as Centre-back and currently play for Okinawa SV.

== Career statistics ==
=== Club ===
Updated to 20 February 2023.

Club performance			League		Cup		League Cup		Total	
Season	Club	League	Apps	Goals	Apps	Goals	Apps	Goals	Apps	Goals
Japan			League		Emperor's Cup		J. League Cup		Total	
2011	Shimizu S-Pulse	J1 League	1	0	0	0	1	0	2	0
2012	Montedio Yamagata	J2 League	8	0	1	0	–		9	0
2013	Shimizu S-Pulse	J1 League	3	0	0	0	0	0	3	0
2014	Tochigi SC	J2 League	26	2	1	0	–		27	2
2015	FC Gifu	J2 League	34	3	2	0	–		36	3
2016	FC Gifu	J2 League	31	1	0	0	–		31	1
2017	SC Sagamihara	J3 League	30	0	–		–		30	0
2018	Okinawa SV	JRL (Kyushu)	18	4	–		–		18	4
2019	Okinawa SV	JRL (Kyushu)	18	3	2	0	–		20	3
2020	Okinawa SV	JRL (Kyushu)	4	0	1	0	–		5	0
2021	Okinawa SV	JRL (Kyushu)	18	1	2	0	–		19	1
2022	Okinawa SV	JRL (Kyushu)	19	0	2	0	–		21	0
2023	Okinawa SV	JFL	0	0	0	0	–		0	0
Total			191	14	9	0	1	0	201	14

== Honours ==
Okinawa SV

- Kyushu Soccer League: 2019, 2021, 2022
