= Yosuke Kawai =

Japanese footballer

Yosuke Kawai 河井 陽介
Personal information
- Full name: Yosuke Kawai
- Date of birth: 4 August 1989 (age 37)
- Place of birth: Fujieda, Shizuoka, Japan
- Height: 1.65 m (5 ft 5 in)
- Position: Midfielder

Youth career
- 2005–2007: Fujieda Higashi High School

College career
Years	Team	Apps	(Gls)
2008–2011	Keio University		

Senior career*
Years	Team	Apps	(Gls)
2010–2021	Shimizu S-Pulse	241	(8)
2022-2024	Fagiano Okayama	56	(1)
2024-2025	Kataller Toyama	48	(0)
Total		345	(9)
Medal record
Shimizu S-Pulse
Runner-up	J.League Cup	2012
- * Club domestic league appearances and goals

Yosuke Kawai (河井 陽介, born 4 August 1989) is a Japanese former footballer who played as a midfielder.

== Career statistics ==
Appearances and goals by club, season and competition
Club	Season	League			National cup (Note: Includes Emperors Cup)		League cup (Note: Includes J.League Cup)		Other		Total	
Club	Season	Division	Apps	Goals	Apps	Goals	Apps	Goals	Apps	Goals	Apps	Goals
Shimizu S-Pulse	2012	J.League Division 1	32	0	2	0	10	1	–		44	1
Shimizu S-Pulse	2013	J.League Division 1	32	1	3	0	5	0	–		40	1
Shimizu S-Pulse	2014	J.League Division 1	30	1	2	0	5	0	–		37	1
Shimizu S-Pulse	2015	J1 League	13	0	1	1	3	0	–		17	1
Shimizu S-Pulse	2016	J2 League	37	1	2	0	0	0	–		39	1
Shimizu S-Pulse	2017	J1 League	3	0	0	0	0	0	–		3	0
Shimizu S-Pulse	2018	J1 League	32	3	2	1	0	0	–		34	4
Shimizu S-Pulse	2019	J1 League	26	2	5	1	5	0	–		36	3
Shimizu S-Pulse	2020	J1 League	12	0	0	0	2	0	–		14	0
Shimizu S-Pulse	2021	J1 League	24	0	2	0	8	0	–		34	0
Shimizu S-Pulse	Total		241	8	19	3	38	1	0	0	298	12
Fagiano Okayama	2022	J2 League	33	1	0	0	–		1 (Note: Appearance in J1/J2 play-offs)	0	34	1
Fagiano Okayama	2023	J2 League	23	0	1	0	–		0	0	24	0
Fagiano Okayama	Total		56	1	1	0	0	0	1	0	58	1
Kataller Toyama	2024	J3 League	32	0	1	0	3	0	–		36	0
Kataller Toyama	2025	J2 League	16	0	2	0	2	0	–		20	0
Kataller Toyama	Total		48	0	3	0	5	0	0	0	56	0
Career total			345	9	23	3	43	1	1	0	412	13
