= Takuya Iwata =

Takuya Iwata may refer to:

- Takuya Iwata (footballer, born 1983) (岩田 卓也), Japanese footballer
- Takuya Iwata (footballer, born 1994) (岩田 拓也), Japanese footballer
