= Tatsuya Anzai =

Japanese professional footballer

Personal information
- Date of birth: 9 May 1996 (age 30)
- Place of birth: Kunitachi, Tokyo, Japan
- Height: 1.73 m (5 ft 8 in)
- Position: Full-back

Team information
- Current team: Fukushima United FC
- Number: 23

Youth career
- –2014: Tokyo Verdy

College career
Years	Team	Apps	(Gls)
2015–2018	Chuo University		

Senior career*
Years	Team	Apps	(Gls)
2018	→ Tokyo Verdy (loan)	0	(0)
2019–2020	Tokyo Verdy	4	(0)
2020	→ Azul Claro Numazu (loan)	21	(0)
2021–2024	Azul Claro Numazu	135	(6)
2025–	Fukushima United FC	49	(1)
- * Club domestic league appearances and goals as of 25 August 2026

Tatsuya Anzai (安在 達弥, Anzai Tatsuya; born 9 May 1996) is a Japanese professional footballer who plays as a full-back for Fukushima United FC.
