= Takuya Miyamoto =

Takuya Miyamoto may refer to:

- Takuya Miyamoto (footballer, born 1983) (宮本 卓也), Japanese footballer
- Takuya Miyamoto (footballer, born 1993) (宮本 拓弥), Japanese footballer
