= Sanno University =

Coordinates: 35°24′54″N 139°17′13″E

- 産業能率大学
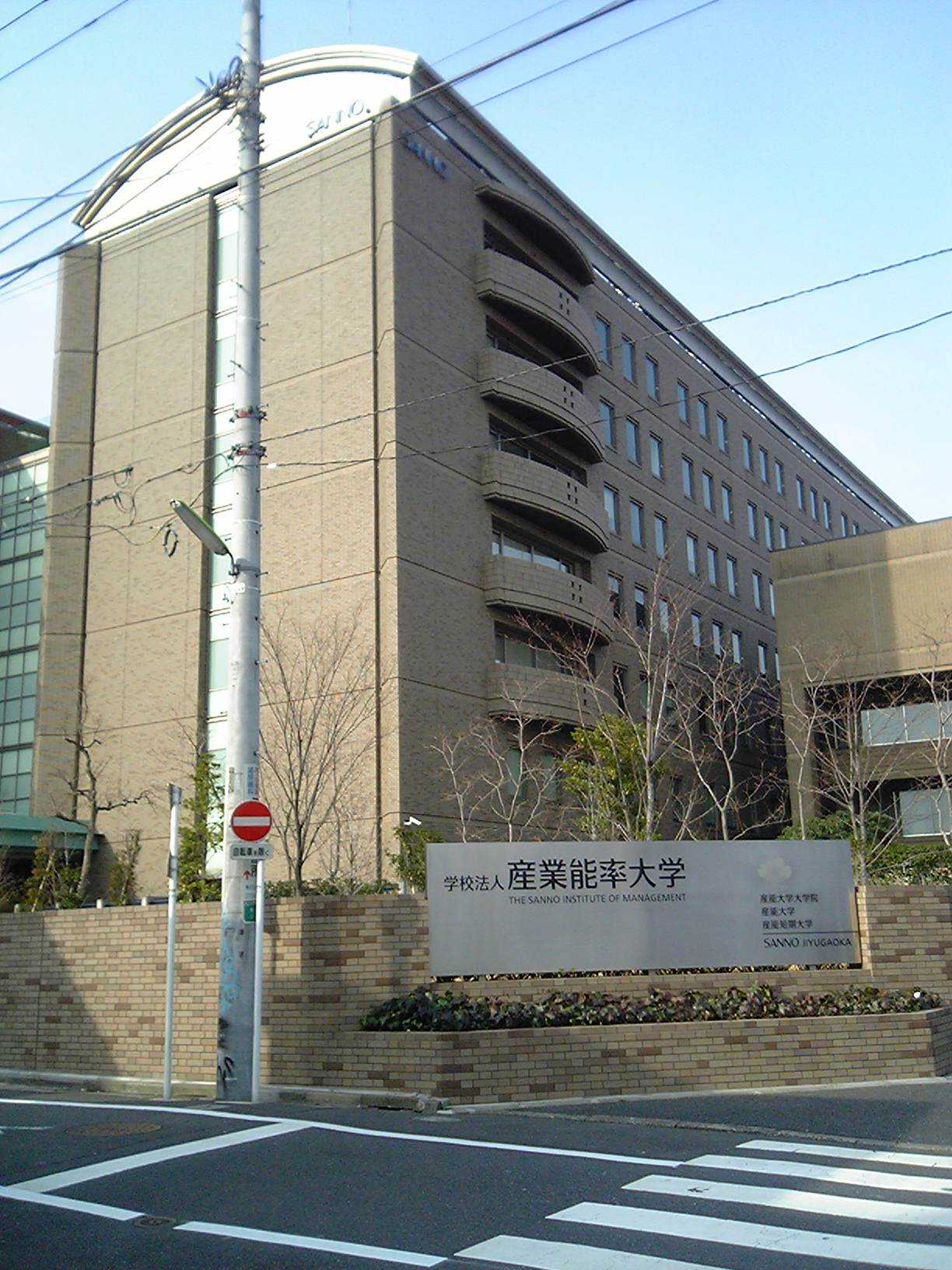
- Type: Private
- Established: 1979
- Location: Isehara, Kanagawa, Japan
- Website: Official website

Sanno University (産業能率大学, Sangyō Nōritsu Daigaku), formerly the Sanno Institute of Management, is a private university established in 1979 in Isehara, Kanagawa Prefecture, Japan. It offers highly interdisciplinary and practical programs in the field of management and information science.

== Administration ==
SANNO consists of two divisions: the Academic and the Business Education divisions.

The Academic Division has a graduate school, an undergraduate school, and a junior college.

The Business Education Division provides management training and consulting services for business people. It has academic programs adopting the practical knowledge and skills developed through business education, and many management consulting programs based on basic theory and academic research. SANNO is also known for its management training and consulting programs covering socio-industrial fields and international affairs.

== Student life ==
The university occupies three campuses: Jiyugaoka Campus (head office, in Setagaya-ku, Tokyo), Shonan Campus (in Kanagawa Prefecture), and Daikanyama Campus (in Meguro-ku, Tokyo).

SANNO is a sponsor of the Shonan Bellmare J-League soccer team.

== Notable alumni ==
- Motoki Takagi, voice actor
