= Takuya Matsumoto =

Japanese footballer

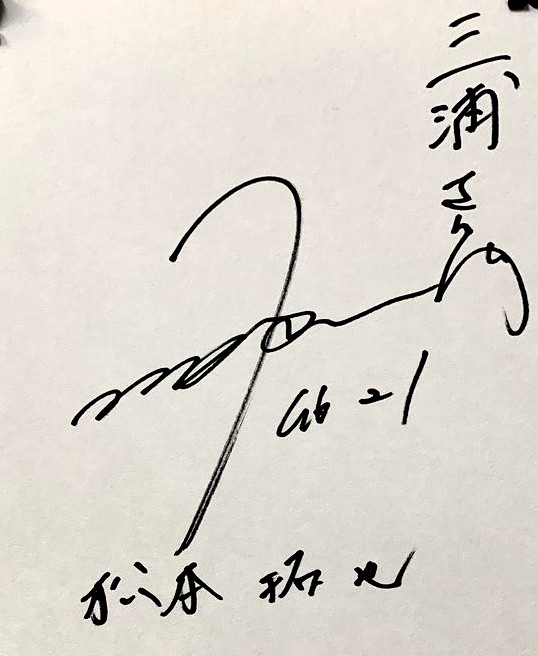

Personal information
- Full name: Takuya Matsumoto
- Date of birth: February 6, 1989 (age 37)
- Place of birth: Numazu, Shizuoka, Japan
- Height: 1.83 m (6 ft 0 in)
- Position: Goalkeeper

Team information
- Current team: FC Gifu
- Number: 19

Youth career
- 2007–2010: Juntendo University

Senior career*
Years	Team	Apps	(Gls)
2010–2012	Shonan Bellmare	1	(0)
2011	→ Kawasaki Frontale (loan)	0	(0)
2013–2014	Giravanz Kitakyushu	2	(0)
2015–2019	Blaublitz Akita	130	(0)
2020–2023	FC Gifu	48	(0)
- * Club domestic league appearances and goals

Takuya Matsumoto (松本 拓也, born February 6, 1989) is a Japanese former football player.

== Career statistics ==
Updated to 25 December 2021.

Appearances and goals by club, season and competition
Club	Season	League			Emperor's Cup		J.League Cup		Total	
Club	Season	Division	Apps	Goals	Apps	Goals	Apps	Goals	Apps	Goals
Juntendo University	2007	-	—		2	0	—		2	0
Juntendo University	2009	-	—		1	0	—		1	0
Juntendo University	2010	-	—		0	0	—		0	0
Shonan Bellmare	2010	J1 League	1	0	0	0	2	0	3	0
Kawasaki Frontale	2011	J1 League	0	0	0	0	0	0	0	0
Shonan Bellmare	2012	J2 League	1	0	1	0	—		2	0
Giravanz Kitakyushu	2013	J2 League	2	0	1	0	—		3	0
Giravanz Kitakyushu	2014	J2 League	0	0	0	0	—		0	0
Blaublitz Akita	2015	J3 League	36	0	2	0	—		38	0
Blaublitz Akita	2016	J3 League	30	0	2	0	—		32	0
Blaublitz Akita	2017	J3 League	16	0	1	0	—		17	0
Blaublitz Akita	2018	J3 League	14	0	0	0	—		14	0
Blaublitz Akita	2019	J3 League	34	0	1	0	—		35	0
FC Gifu	2020	J3 League	21	0	—		—		21	0
FC Gifu	2021	J3 League	9	0	0	0	—		9	0
Career total			164	0	12	0	2	0	178	0

== Honours ==
Blaublitz Akita

- J3 League (1): 2017
