= Takuya Muraoka =

Japanese footballer

Personal information
- Full name: Takuya Muraoka
- Date of birth: 24 July 1990 (age 36)
- Place of birth: Kanazawa-ku, Yokohama, Japan
- Height: 1.86 m (6 ft 1 in)
- Position: Defender

Team information
- Current team: Tochigi Uva FC
- Number: 27

Youth career
- 2006–2008: Nihon University Junior High School
- 2009–2012: Kanagawa University

Senior career*
Years	Team	Apps	(Gls)
2013–2014	Shonan Bellmare	0	(0)
2014	→ Fukushima United FC (loan)	20	(1)
2015–2016	Fukushima United FC	42	(1)
2017–	Tochigi Uva FC		
- * Club domestic league appearances and goals as of 23 February 2017

Takuya Muraoka (村岡拓哉, Muraoka, Takuya; born 24 July 1990 in Kanazawa-ku, Yokohama) is a Japanese footballer who plays for Fukushima United FC.

== Club statistics ==
Updated to 23 February 2017.

Club performance			League		Cup		Total	
Season	Club	League	Apps	Goals	Apps	Goals	Apps	Goals
Japan			League		Emperor's Cup		Total	
2013	Shonan Bellmare	J1 League	0	0	0	0	0	0
2014	Fukushima; United FC	J3 League	20	1	1	0	21	1
2015	Fukushima; United FC	J3 League	23	1	0	0	23	1
2016	Fukushima; United FC	J3 League	19	0	2	0	21	0
Career total			62	2	3	0	65	2
