= Hiroto Nakagawa (footballer, born 2000) =

Japanese footballer

Personal information
- Date of birth: 25 May 2000 (age 26)
- Place of birth: Wakayama, Japan
- Height: 1.69 m (5 ft 7 in)
- Position: Forward

Youth career
- Kii Junior FC
- –2015: Cerezo Osaka
- 2016–2018: Kokoku High School

Senior career*
Years	Team	Apps	(Gls)
2019–2020	Ehime FC	0	(0)
- * Club domestic league appearances and goals as of 17:04, 28 May 2021 (UTC)

Hiroto Nakagawa (中川 裕仁, Nakagawa Hiroto; born 25 May 2000) is a Japanese footballer.

== Club career ==
Nakagawa made his professional debut on 3 July 2019 in an Emperor's Cup game against Tokushima Vortis.

== Career statistics ==
=== Club ===
As of 28 June 2020.

Club	Season	League			National Cup		League Cup		Other		Total	
Club	Season	Division	Apps	Goals	Apps	Goals	Apps	Goals	Apps	Goals	Apps	Goals
Ehime	2018	J2 League	0	0	0	0	0	0	0	0	0	0
Ehime	2019	J2 League	0	0	1 (Note: Appearance(s) in Emperor's Cup)	0	0	0	0	0	1	0
Ehime	2020	J2 League	0	0	0	0	0	0	0	0	0	0
Career total			0	0	1	0	0	0	0	0	1	0
