= 2021 Nagoya Grampus season =

Nagoya Grampus
2021 season
- Chairman: Toyo Kato
- Manager: Massimo Ficcadenti
- J1 League: 5th
- Emperor's Cup: Quarterfinal
- J. League Cup: Champions
- AFC Champions League: Quarterfinal vs Pohang Steelers
- Top goalscorer: League: Three Players (7); All: Mateus (14)
Home colours	Away colours

The 2021 Nagoya Grampus season was Nagoya Grampus' 4th season back in the J1 League following their relegation at the end of the 2016 season, their 28th J1 League season and 38th overall in the Japanese top flight. Nagoya Grampus participated in the J1 League, Emperor's Cup, J. League Cup and the AFC Champions League.

== Season events ==
On 28 December, Nagoya Grampus announced the signing of Kazuki Nagasawa from Urawa Red Diamonds.

On 29 December, Nagoya Grampus announced the signing of Ryoya Morishita from Sagan Tosu.

On 7 January, Jonathan Matsuoka was loaned to Kamatamare Sanuki until 31 January 2022.

On 9 January, Nagoya Grampus announced the signing of Manabu Saitō from Kawasaki Frontale, whilst Daiki Enomoto was loaned to Ehime until 31 January 2022.

On 15 January, Nagoya Grampus announced the permanent signing of Mu Kanazaki from Sagan Tosu after he'd spent the 2020 season on loan at Nagoya Grampas.

On 16 January, Shuto Watanabe was loaned to Mito HollyHock until 31 January 2022.

On 11 March, the Asian Football Confederation confirmed that Thailand would host Nagoya Grampus' group G games in the 2021 AFC Champions League.

On 20 July, Nagoya Grampus announced the signing of Jakub Świerczok from Piast Gliwice.

On 12 August, Nagoya Grampus announced the signing of Kim Min-tae on loan from Hokkaido Consadole Sapporo for the remainder of the season.

On 9 December, Head Coach Massimo Ficcadenti left the club after his contract expired.

== Squad ==
As of match played 4 December 2021

No.	Name	Nationality	Position	Date of birth (age)	Signed from	Signed in	Contract ends	Apps.	Goals
Goalkeepers
1	Mitchell Langerak	(Australia)	GK	22 August 1988 (aged 33)	Levante	2018		161	0
18	Tsubasa Shibuya	(Japan)	GK	27 January 1995 (aged 26)	Yokohama	2017		8	0
21	Yohei Takeda	(Japan)	GK	30 June 1987 (aged 34)	Oita Trinita	2016		39	0
22	Daiki Mitsui	(Japan)	GK	27 May 2001 (aged 20)	Academy	2020		0	0
Defenders
3	Yuichi Maruyama	(Japan)	DF	16 June 1989 (aged 32)	FC Tokyo	2018		105	3
4	Shinnosuke Nakatani	(Japan)	DF	24 March 1996 (aged 25)	Kashiwa Reysol	2018		148	5
6	Kazuya Miyahara	(Japan)	DF	22 March 1996 (aged 25)	Sanfrecce Hiroshima	2019		154	4
13	Haruya Fujii	(Japan)	DF	26 December 2000 (aged 20)	Academy	2018		21	1
14	Yasuki Kimoto	(Japan)	DF	6 August 1993 (aged 28)	Cerezo Osaka	2021		48	1
17	Ryoya Morishita	(Japan)	DF	11 April 1997 (aged 24)	Sagan Tosu	2021		38	0
20	Kim Min-tae	(South Korea)	DF	26 November 1993 (aged 28)	loan from Hokkaido Consadole Sapporo	2021	2021	19	1
23	Yutaka Yoshida	(Japan)	DF	17 February 1990 (aged 31)	Sagan Tosu	2019		121	3
26	Shumpei Naruse	(Japan)	DF	17 January 2001 (aged 20)	Academy	2018		61	0
28	Akira Yoshida	(Japan)	DF	9 July 2001 (aged 20)	Academy	2020		0	0
Midfielders
2	Takuji Yonemoto	(Japan)	MF	3 December 1990 (aged 31)	Tokyo	2019		98	1
5	Kazuki Nagasawa	(Japan)	MF	16 December 1991 (aged 29)	Urawa Red Diamonds	2021		47	1
7	Hiroyuki Abe	(Japan)	MF	5 July 1989 (aged 32)	Kawasaki Frontale	2020		43	6
15	Sho Inagaki	(Japan)	MF	25 December 1991 (aged 29)	Sanfrecce Hiroshima	2020		91	14
24	Ryotaro Ishida	(Japan)	MF	13 December 2001 (aged 19)	Academy	2018		12	1
27	Shunto Kodama	(Japan)	MF	3 December 1999 (aged 22)	Academy	2018		10	1
44	Mu Kanazaki	(Japan)	MF	16 February 1989 (aged 32)	Sagan Tosu	2021		135	22
Forwards
8	Yoichiro Kakitani	(Japan)	FW	3 January 1990 (aged 31)	Cerezo Osaka	2021		52	9
9	Ryogo Yamasaki	(Japan)	FW	20 September 1992 (aged 29)	Shonan Bellmare	2020		62	9
10	Gabriel Xavier	(Brazil)	FW	15 July 1993 (aged 28)	Cruzeiro	2018		137	22
11	Yuki Soma	(Japan)	FW	25 February 1997 (aged 24)	Academy	2018		115	10
16	Mateus	(Brazil)	FW	11 September 1994 (aged 27)	Omiya Ardija	2019		105	29
19	Manabu Saitō	(Japan)	FW	4 April 1990 (aged 31)	Kawasaki Frontale	2021		33	1
25	Naoki Maeda	(Japan)	FW	17 November 1995 (aged 26)	Matsumoto Yamaga	2018		141	28
40	Jakub Świerczok	(Poland)	FW	28 December 1992 (aged 28)	Piast Gliwice	2021		21	12
Away on loan
	John Higashi	(Japan)	GK	2 May 2002 (aged 19)	Academy	2021		0	0
	Daiki Enomoto	(Japan)	MF	21 June 1996 (aged 25)	Academy	2018		11	0
	Shuto Watanabe	(Japan)	MF	28 January 1997 (aged 24)	Academy	2019		0	0
	Jonathan Matsuoka	(Paraguay)	FW	27 May 2000 (aged 21)	Academy	2019		0	0
Left during the season

=== Out on loan ===
Note: Flags indicate national team as defined under FIFA eligibility rules; some limited exceptions apply. Players may hold more than one non-FIFA nationality.

No.	Pos.	Nation	Player
—	GK	JPN	John Higashi (at Tochigi)
—	MF	JPN	Daiki Enomoto (at Ehime)

No.	Pos.	Nation	Player
—	MF	JPN	Shuto Watanabe (at Mito HollyHock)
—	FW	PAR	Jonathan Matsuoka (at Kamatamare Sanuki)

== Transfers ==
=== In ===
Date	Position	Nationality	Name	From	Fee	Ref.
24 December 2020	FW	(Japan)	Yoichiro Kakitani	Cerezo Osaka	Undisclosed	
28 December 2020	MF	(Japan)	Kazuki Nagasawa	Urawa Red Diamonds	Undisclosed	
29 December 2020	MF	(Japan)	Ryoya Morishita	Sagan Tosu	Undisclosed	
9 January 2021	MF	(Japan)	Yasuki Kimoto	Cerezo Osaka	Undisclosed	
9 January 2021	FW	(Japan)	Manabu Saitō	Kawasaki Frontale	Undisclosed	
15 January 2021	MF	(Japan)	Mu Kanazaki	Sagan Tosu	Free	
20 July 2021	FW	(Poland)	Jakub Świerczok	Piast Gliwice	Undisclosed	

=== Loans in ===
Date from	Position	Nationality	Name	From	Date to	Ref.
12 August 2021	MF	(South Korea)	Kim Min-tae	Hokkaido Consadole Sapporo	1 January 2022	

=== Out ===
Date	Position	Nationality	Name	To	Fee	Ref.
28 December 2020	MF	(Japan)	Ariajasuru Hasegawa	Machida Zelvia	Undisclosed	
30 December 2020	MF	(Japan)	Shumpei Fukahori	Mito HollyHock	Undisclosed	
6 January 2021	MF	(Brazil)	João Schmidt	Kawasaki Frontale	Undisclosed	
6 January 2021	MF	(Japan)	Ryota Aoki	Hokkaido Consadole Sapporo	Undisclosed	
7 January 2021	MF	(Japan)	Koki Sugimori	Tokushima Vortis	Undisclosed	
9 January 2021	MF	(Japan)	Yosuke Akiyama	Vegalta Sendai	Undisclosed	
12 January 2021	MF	(South Korea)	Oh Jae-suk	Incheon United	Undisclosed	
26 February 2021	MF	(Japan)	Yuki Ogaki	RFS	Undisclosed	

=== Loans out ===
Date from	Position	Nationality	Name	To	Date to	Ref.
7 January 2021	FW	(Paraguay)	Jonathan Matsuoka	Kamatamare Sanuki	31 January 2021	
9 January 2021	MF	(Japan)	Daiki Enomoto	Ehime	31 January 2021	
16 January 2021	MF	(Japan)	Shuto Watanabe	Mito HollyHock	31 January 2021	
31 January 2021	GK	(Japan)	John Higashi	Tochigi	31 January 2021	

== Friendlies ==
	–
JST (UTC+9)

== Competitions ==
=== J. League ===
==== Results summary ====
Overall								Home						Away					
Pld	W	D	L	GF	GA	GD	Pts	W	D	L	GF	GA	GD	W	D	L	GF	GA	GD
38	19	9	10	44	30	+14	66	11	4	4	22	13	+9	8	5	6	22	17	+5

Last updated: 4 December 2021.
Source: see below

==== Results by round ====
Round	1	2	3	4	5	6	7	8	9	10	11	12	13	14	15	16	17	18	19	20	21	22	23	24	25	26	27	28	29	30	31	32	33	34	35	36	37	38
Ground	A	H	A	A	H	A	H	A	A	H	A	H	H	A	H	H	A	A	H	A	A	A	A	H	H	A	H	H	H	A	H	A	H	H	A	A	A	H
Result	W	W	W	W	W	W	D	D	W	W	L	W	L	L	W	L	W	D	L	D	L	L	L	W	W	W	D	W	W	D	W	L	D	W	D	W	L	D
Position	5	3	3	2	2	2	2	2	2	2	2	2	2	2	2	2	5	5	5	5	5	6	7	6	5	4	6	4	3	3	3	4	4	4	5	4	5	5

Updated to match(es) played on 4 December 2021. Source: See Below
A = Away; H = Home; W = Win; D = Draw; L = Loss

==== Results ====
28 February 2021 1	Avispa Fukuoka	1–2	Nagoya Grampus	Fukuoka
13:00 JST (UTC+9)	Grolli (yellow card) 7'; Shigehiro (yellow card) 47'; Yoshida 82' (o.g.); Shichi (yellow card) 90'	Report	Mateus 4', 55'; Yamasaki (yellow card) 12'; Soma (yellow card) 49'	Stadium: Best Denki Stadium; Referee: Hiroki Kasahara

6 March 2021 2	Nagoya Grampus	1–0	Hokkaido Consadole Sapporo	Toyota
16:00 JST (UTC+9)	Naruse (yellow card) 58'; Soma 82'	Report	Kaneko (yellow card) 18'	Stadium: Toyota Stadium; Referee: Nobutsugu Murakami

10 March 2021 3	Kashiwa Reysol	0–1	Nagoya Grampus	Kashiwa
17:00 JST (UTC+9)		Report	Ominami 58' (o.g.); Nagasawa (yellow card) 85'	Stadium: Sankyo Frontier Kashiwa Stadium; Referee: Masaaki Toma

13 March 2021 4	Vissel Kobe	0–1	Nagoya Grampus	Kobe
18:00 JST (UTC+9)	Samper (yellow card) 84'	Report	Inagaki 19'	Stadium: Noevir Stadium Kobe; Referee: Koichiro Fukushima

17 March 2021 5	Nagoya Grampus	3–0	Yokohama	Toyota
19:00 JST (UTC+9)	Maeda 52'; Mateus 63'; Yamasaki 90+4'	Report	Takeda (yellow card) 23'; Tashiro (yellow card) 84'	Stadium: Toyota Stadium; Referee: Jumpei Iida

21 March 2021 6	Kashima Antlers	0–1	Nagoya Grampus	Kashima
16:00 JST (UTC+9)	Koizumi (yellow card) 56'; Araki (yellow card) 63'; Inukai (yellow card) 66' (yellow-red card) 82'; Machida (yellow card) 90+2'; Everaldo (yellow card) 90+5'	Report	Inagaki 59'; Yonemoto (yellow card) 90+5'	Stadium: Kashima Soccer Stadium; Referee: Hiroyuki Kimura

3 April 2021 7	Nagoya Grampus	0–0	Tokyo	Toyota
14:00 JST (UTC+9)	Yoshida (yellow card) 49'; Kimoto (yellow card) 90+5'	Report	T.Watanabe (yellow card) 81'	Stadium: Toyota Stadium; Referee: Yuichi Nishimura

7 April 2021 8	Shonan Bellmare	0–0	Nagoya Grampus	Hiratsuka
19:00 JST (UTC+9)	Miyuki (yellow card) 39' (yellow-red card) 43'; Takahashi (yellow card) 82'; Oiwa (yellow card) 90+3'	Report	Nakatani (yellow card) 13'; Soma (yellow card) 52'	Stadium: Lemon Gas Stadium Hiratsuka; Referee: Yoshiro Imamura

11 April 2021 9	Oita Trinita	0–3	Nagoya Grampus	Ōita
15:00 JST (UTC+9)	Kobayashi (yellow card) 64'	Report	Yamasaki 33'; Saka 44' (o.g.); Kakitani 90+2'	Stadium: Showa Denko Dome Oita; Referee: Yudai Yamamoto

14 April 2021 19	Nagoya Grampus	1–0	Sanfrecce Hiroshima	Toyota
19:30 JST (UTC+9)	Maruyama 22'; Kakitani (yellow card) 36'; Yonemoto (yellow card) 75'	Report	Rhayner (yellow card) 90+1'; Kawabe (yellow card) 90+2'	Stadium: Toyota Stadium; Referee: Hajime Matsuo

18 April 2021 10	Nagoya Grampus	1–2	Sagan Tosu	Toyota
15:00 JST (UTC+9)	Nagasawa (yellow card) 44'; Inagaki 85'	Report	Hayashi 6' (yellow card) 24'; Iino (yellow card) 31'; Sakai 45'	Stadium: Toyota Stadium; Referee: Futoshi Nakamura

22 April 2021 11	Nagoya Grampus	2–0	Gamba Osaka	Toyota
19:30 JST (UTC+9)	Yamasaki (yellow card) 14' (goal) 29'; Soma 55'	Report	Shoji (yellow card) 62'; Usami (yellow card) 88'	Stadium: Toyota Stadium; Referee: Hiroki Kasahara

29 April 2021 22	Nagoya Grampus	0–4	Kawasaki Frontale	Toyota
15:00 JST (UTC+9)		Report	Hatate 3' (yellow card) 51'; Damião 10', 23'; Tono 84'	Stadium: Toyota Stadium; Referee: Yusuke Araki

4 May 2021 12	Kawasaki Frontale	3–2	Nagoya Grampus	Kawasaki
15:00 JST (UTC+9)	Jesiel 30'; Yamane 50'; Maruyama 59' (o.g.)	Report	Inagaki 73'; Mateus 83'	Stadium: Kawasaki Todoroki Stadium; Referee: Yuichi Nishimura

8 May 2021 13	Nagoya Grampus	1–0	Cerezo Osaka	Toyota
15:00 JST (UTC+9)	Yoshida 66'; Yonemoto (yellow card) 70'; Kakitani (yellow card) 77'	Report	Takagi (yellow card) 59'	Stadium: Toyota Stadium; Referee: Yudai Yamamoto

12 May 2021 21	Nagoya Grampus	0–2	Kashima Antlers	Toyota
19:00 JST (UTC+9)	Nakatani (yellow card) 90+4'	Report	Inukai 32'; Sugioka 86'	Stadium: Toyota Stadium; Referee: Koichiro Fukushima

15 May 2021 14	Shimizu S-Pulse	0–3	Nagoya Grampus	Shizuoka
14:00 JST (UTC+9)	Elsinho (yellow card) 30'; Valdo (yellow card) 40'; Okui (yellow card) 60'	Report	Kakitani 24'; Mateus 50', 89'	Stadium: IAI Stadium Nihondaira; Referee: Hayato Shimizu

22 May 2021 15	Tokushima Vortis	0–0	Nagoya Grampus	Naruto
18:00 JST (UTC+9)	Suzuki (yellow card) 51'; Cvetinović (yellow card) 59'	Report	Kimoto (yellow card) 38'	Stadium: Pocarisweat Stadium; Referee: Yoshiro Imamura

26 May 2021 16	Nagoya Grampus	0–1	Vegalta Sendai	Toyota
19:00 JST (UTC+9)	Kimoto (yellow card) 82'	Report	Martinus 42'	Stadium: Toyota Stadium; Referee: Hajime Matsuo

30 May 2021 17	Urawa Red Diamonds	0–0	Nagoya Grampus	Saitama
18:00 JST (UTC+9)		Report		Stadium: Saitama Stadium 2002; Referee: Ryo Tanimoto

17 July 2021 20	Sagan Tosu	3–1	Nagoya Grampus	Tosu
19:00 JST (UTC+9)	Nakano (yellow card) 41' (goal) 48'; Sakai 51'; Koyamatsu 80'	Report	Eduardo 39' (o.g.); Inagaki (yellow card) 53'	Stadium: Ekimae Real Estate Stadium; Referee: Masaaki Toma

9 August 2021 23	Yokohama	2–0	Nagoya Grampus	Yokohama
18:00 JST (UTC+9)	Nakatani 9' (o.g.); Matsuo 33'; Gabriel (yellow card) 69'; Yasunaga (yellow card) 81'	Report		Stadium: NHK Spring Mitsuzawa Football Stadium; Referee: Hiroyuki Kimura

12 August 2021 18	Yokohama F. Marinos	2–0	Nagoya Grampus	Yokohama
19:00 JST (UTC+9)	Sugimoto 13'; Marcos Júnior 33' (pen.); Kida (yellow card) 45+1'; Bunmathan (yellow card) 79' (yellow-red card) 90+2'	Report	Kakitani (yellow card) 10'; Mateus (yellow card) 52'	Stadium: Nissan Stadium; Referee: Ryuji Sato

15 August 2021 24	Nagoya Grampus	1–0	Shonan Bellmare	Toyota
18:00 JST (UTC+9)	Yonemoto (yellow card) 37'; Kim 74'	Report	Oiwa (yellow card) 57'; Hata 76'	Stadium: Toyota Stadium; Referee: Masuya Ueda

22 August 2021 25	Nagoya Grampus	1–0	Avispa Fukuoka	Toyota
18:00 JST (UTC+9)	Naruse (yellow card) 34'; Świerczok 49'	Report	Salomonsson (yellow card) 64'; Grolli (yellow card) 90+1'	Stadium: Toyota Stadium; Referee: Hajime Matsuo

25 August 2021 26	Hokkaido Consadole Sapporo	0–2	Nagoya Grampus	Sapporo
19:00 JST (UTC+9)		Report	Inagaki 30', 45'; Yonemoto (yellow card) 39'	Stadium: Sapporo Dome; Referee: Maasaki Toma

29 August 2021 27	Nagoya Grampus	1–1	Shimizu S-Pulse	Toyota
18:99 JST (UTC+9)	Maeda 57'	Report	Thiago Santana 74'	Stadium: Toyota Stadium; Referee: Koei Koya

10 September 2021 28	Nagoya Grampus	3–0	Tokushima Vortis	Toyota
19:00 JST (UTC+9)	Mateus 52' (pen.); Fujita 83' (o.g.); Kanazaki 89' (pen.)	Report	Kishimoto (red card) 50'; Ichimi (yellow card) 76'; Ishii (yellow card) 90+3'	Stadium: Toyota Stadium; Referee: Yuichi Nishimura

18 September 2021 29	Nagoya Grampus	2–1	Yokohama F. Marinos	Toyota
19:00 JST (UTC+9)	Nakatani 12'; Mateus (yellow card) 19'; Świerczok 46'; Yonemoto (yellow card) 73'	Report	Léo Ceará (yellow card) 42'; Koike (yellow card) 52'; Kida (yellow card) 55'; Sugimoto 72'	Stadium: Toyota Stadium; Referee: Toma Maasaki

22 September 2021 32	Tokyo	1–1	Nagoya Grampus	Tokyo
19:00 JST (UTC+9)	Adaílton 26'; Aoki (yellow card) 42'; Leandro (red card) 81'	Report	Świerczok 43'	Stadium: Ajinomoto Stadium; Referee: Koichiro Fukushima

26 September 2021 30	Nagoya Grampus	1–0	Oita Trinita	Toyota
16:00 JST (UTC+9)	Inagaki 7'	Report		Stadium: Toyota Stadium; Referee: Masuya Ueda

3 October 2021 31	Sanfrecce Hiroshima	1–0	Nagoya Grampus	Hiroshima
15:00 JST (UTC+9)	Asano 35'; Rhayner (yellow card) 83'	Report		Stadium: Edion Stadium Hiroshima; Referee: Futoshi Nakamura

24 October 2021 33	Nagoya Grampus	2–2	Vissel Kobe	Toyota
15:00 JST (UTC+9)	Maeda 6'; Świerczok 14'	Report	Samper (yellow card) 30'; Douglas (yellow card) 34'; Sakai (yellow card) 38'; Muto 59'; Iniesta 87' (pen.)	Stadium: Toyota Stadium; Referee: Yoshiro Imamura

3 November 2021 34	Nagoya Grampus	2–0	Kashiwa Reysol	Toyota
15:00 JST (UTC+9)	Świerczok 34'; Nakatani 71'	Report		Stadium: Toyota Stadium; Referee: Koichiro Fukushima

7 November 2021 35	Vegalta Sendai	1–1	Nagoya Grampus	Sendai
14:00 JST (UTC+9)	Nishimura 47'	Report	Kakitani 14'; Nagasawa (yellow card) 63'	Stadium: Yurtec Stadium Sendai; Referee: Takuto Okabe

20 November 2021 36	Gamba Osaka	1–3	Nagoya Grampus	Suita
14:00 JST (UTC+9)	Kurata (yellow card) 30'; Patric 53' (yellow card) 85'; Yanagisawa (yellow card) 54'	Report	Świerczok 8', 29'; Kakitani 22'	Stadium: Panasonic Stadium Suita; Referee: Hiroyuki Kimura

27 November 2021 37	Cerezo Osaka	2–1	Nagoya Grampus	Osaka
14:00 JST (UTC+9)	Langerak 80' (o.g.); Nishio 87'	Report	Kakitani 67'; Nagasawa (yellow card) 77'	Stadium: Yanmar Stadium Nagai; Referee: Hajime Matsuo

4 December 2021 38	Nagoya Grampus	0–0	Urawa Red Diamonds	Toyota
14:00 JST (UTC+9)	Kimoto (yellow card) 20'; Kim (yellow card) 45+1'; Kakitani (yellow card) 77'	Report		Stadium: Toyota Stadium; Referee: Nobutsugu Murakami

==== League table ====
Pos	Team	Pld	W	D	L	GF	GA	GD	Pts	Qualification or relegation
3	Vissel Kobe	38	21	10	7	62	36	+26	73	Qualification for the AFC Champions League play-off round
4	Kashima Antlers	38	21	6	11	62	36	+26	69	
5	Nagoya Grampus	38	19	9	10	44	30	+14	66	
6	Urawa Red Diamonds	38	18	9	11	45	38	+7	63 (Note: The JPFL awarded a 3–0 win to Shonan Bellmare after Urawa Red Diamonds fielded Zion Suzuki who was an ineligible player. The original score was 3–2 for Shonan Bellmare.)	Qualification for the AFC Champions League group stage (Note: Qualified as the 2021 Emperor's Cup winners.)
7	Sagan Tosu	38	16	11	11	43	35	+8	59	

Source: Meiji Yasuda J1 League, J.League Data Site
Rules for classification: 1) Points; 2) Goal difference; 3) Goals scored; 4) Head-to-head points; 5) Head-to-head goal difference; 6) Head-to-head goal scored; 7) Fair-play points.

=== Emperor's Cup ===
9 June 2021 Second Round	Nagoya Grampus	5–0	Mitsubishi Mizushima	Gifu
18:00 JST (UTC+9)	Fujii 36'; Nagasawa 39'; Mateus 64', 90+1'; Ishida 89'	Report		Stadium: Gifu Nagaragawa Stadium; Attendance: 1,886; Referee: Masuya Ueda

2 August 2021 Third Round	Nagoya Grampus	1–0	Fagiano Okayama	Nagoya
18:00 JST (UTC+9)	Nakatani 33'	Report	Uejo (yellow card) 41'; Paulinho (yellow card) 62'	Stadium: Nagoya Minato Stadium; Attendance: 2,001; Referee: Takuto Okabe
Note: Match originally kicked off on 14 July, but postponed at half-time due to inclement weather. The match was replayed from the beginning on 2 August, with the previous in-progress match being annulled.

18 August 2021 Fourth round	Nagoya Grampus	1–0	Vissel Kobe	Toyota
18:00 JST (UTC+9)	Świerczok 89'	Report		Stadium: Toyota Stadium; Attendance: 3,453; Referee: Hiroki Kasahara

27 October 2021 Quarterfinal	Nagoya Grampus	0–3	Cerezo Osaka	Toyota
18:00 JST (UTC+9)		Report	Toriumi 32'; Tiago Pagnussat 38'; Taggart 62'; Nishikawa (yellow card) 78'	Stadium: Toyota Stadium; Attendance: 5,202; Referee: Hiroki Kasahara

=== J. League Cup ===
==== Knockout stage ====
1 September 2021 Quarterfinal 1st leg	Nagoya Grampus	2–0	Kashima Antlers	Toyota
19:00 JST (UTC+9)	Kakitani 13'; Inagaki 53'; Yonemoto (yellow card) 60'; Kanazaki (yellow card) 90+1'	Report	Endo (yellow card) 31'; Anzai (yellow card) 56'; Machida (yellow card) 83'	Stadium: Toyota Stadium; Attendance: 5,744; Referee: Nobutsugu Murakami

5 September 2021 Quarterfinal 2nd leg	Kashima Antlers	0–2 (0–4 agg.)	Nagoya Grampus	Kashima
18:03 JST (UTC+9)	Hayashi (yellow card) 35'; Endo (yellow card) 64'	Report	Inagaki 22'; Świerczok 57'	Stadium: Kashima Soccer Stadium; Referee: Yoshiro Imamura

6 October 2021 Semifinal 1st leg	Nagoya Grampus	3-1	Tokyo	Toyota
19:03 JST (UTC+9)	Kakitani 17'; Kim.M-t (yellow card) 51'; Kimoto 69'; Inagaki (yellow card) 82'; Mateus 90+4' (yellow card) 90+4'	Report	Hasuwaka (yellow card) 68'; Watanabe (yellow card) 84'; Adailton 90+3'	Stadium: Toyota Stadium; Attendance: 7,778; Referee: Hiroyuki Kimura

10 October 2021 Semifinal 2nd leg	Tokyo	2-1 (3-4 agg.)	Nagoya Grampus	Chōfu
14:03 JST (UTC+9)	Adailton 15'; Takahagi 55'	Report	Inagaki 80'	Stadium: Ajinomoto Stadium; Attendance: 9,910; Referee: Matsuo Hajime

==== Final ====
30 October 2021	Nagoya Grampus	2-0	Cerezo Osaka	Saitama
13:09 JST (UTC+9)	Maeda 47'; Inagaki 79'	Report		Stadium: Saitama Stadium 2002; Attendance: 17,933; Referee: Masaaki Toma

=== AFC Champions League ===
==== Group stage ====
Pos	Team	Pld	W	D	L	GF	GA	GD	Pts	Qualification
1	(Japan) Nagoya Grampus	6	5	1	0	14	2	+12	16	Advance to Round of 16
2	(South Korea) Pohang Steelers	6	3	2	1	9	5	+4	11	Advance to Round of 16
3	(Malaysia) Johor Darul Ta'zim	6	1	1	4	3	9	−6	4	
4	(Thailand) Ratchaburi Mitr Phol (H)	6	0	2	4	0	10	−10	2	

Source: AFC
(H) Hosts

21 June 2021 1	Johor Darul Ta'zim (Malaysia)	0 – 1	(Japan) Nagoya Grampus	Thailand
23:00 JST (UTC+9)	Rasid (yellow card) 17'; Maurício (yellow card) 44'; Velázquez (yellow card) 61'; Bergson (yellow card) 64'; Corbin-Ong (yellow card) 70'	Report	Inagaki (yellow card) 29'; Yonemoto (yellow card) 40'; Abe 60'; Yamasaki (yellow card) 66'	Stadium: Rajamangala Stadium, Bangkok; Attendance: 0 Referee: Mohammed Abdulla Hassan Mohamed (United Arab Emirates)
Note: Match played behind closed doors due to the COVID-19 pandemic in Thailand.

25 June 2021 2	Nagoya Grampus (Japan)	3 – 0	(South Korea) Pohang Steelers	Thailand
19:00 JST (UTC+9)	Kakitani 34'; Y.Yoshida (yellow card) 50'; Nagasawa (yellow card) 51'; Mateus 65' (pen.), 82'	Report	Shin (yellow card) 34' (yellow-red card) 64'; Grant (yellow card) 66'; Lee S-m (yellow card) 86'; Lee S-b (yellow card) 88'	Stadium: Rajamangala Stadium, Bangkok; Attendance: 0 Referee: Turki Al-Khudhayr (Saudi Arabia)
Note: Match played behind closed doors due to the COVID-19 pandemic in Thailand.

28 June 2021 3	Ratchaburi Mitr Phol (Thailand)	0 – 4	(Japan) Nagoya Grampus	Thailand
19:00 JST (UTC+9)		Report	Yamasaki 26', 31', 45+1'; Saitō 69'; Morishita (yellow card) 81'	Stadium: Rajamangala Stadium, Bangkok; Attendance: 0 Referee: Omar Al-Yaqoubi (Oman)
Note: Match played behind closed doors due to the COVID-19 pandemic in Thailand.

1 July 2021 4	Nagoya Grampus (Japan)	3 – 0	(Thailand) Ratchaburi Mitr Phol	Thailand
23:00 JST (UTC+9)	Mateus (yellow card) 47' (goal) 50'; Kakitani 73'; Yamasaki 79'	Report	Mapuku (yellow card) 60'; Sueasakul (yellow card) 85'; Wettayawong (yellow card) 87'	Stadium: Rajamangala Stadium, Bangkok; Attendance: 0 Referee: Turki Al-Khudhayr (Saudi Arabia)
Note: Match played behind closed doors due to the COVID-19 pandemic in Thailand.

4 July 2021 5	Nagoya Grampus (Japan)	2 – 1	(Malaysia) Johor Darul Ta'zim	Thailand
23:00 JST (UTC+9)	Mateus 4' (pen.); Abe 28' (yellow card) 52'; Yonemoto (yellow card) 36'; Miyahara (yellow card) 38'	Report	Bakri (yellow card) 12'; Ramadhan 42'; Ahmad (yellow card) 77'; Maurício (yellow card) 79'	Stadium: Rajamangala Stadium, Bangkok; Attendance: 0 Referee: Alireza Faghani (Iran)
Note: Match played behind closed doors due to the COVID-19 pandemic in Thailand.

7 July 2021 6	Pohang Steelers (South Korea)	1 – 1	(Japan) Nagoya Grampus	Thailand
19:00 JST (UTC+9)	Gwon (yellow card) 66'; Tashchy 88'	Report	Nakatani (yellow card) 46'; Maeda 51'; Naruse (yellow card) 74'	Stadium: Rajamangala Stadium, Bangkok; Attendance: 0 Referee: Mohammed Abdulla Hassan Mohamed (United Arab Emirates)
Note: Match played behind closed doors due to the COVID-19 pandemic in Thailand.

==== Knockout stage ====
14 September 2021 Last 16	Nagoya Grampus (Japan)	4–2	(South Korea) Daegu	Nagoya, Japan
18:00 JST (UTC+9)	Świerczok 12', 63', 65'; Nakatani 79'	Report	Cesinha 4'; Edgar 28'; Hwang S-M (yellow card) 38'; An Y-W (yellow card) 87'	Stadium: Toyota Stadium; Attendance: 5,442; Referee: Adham Makhadmeh (Jordan)

17 October 2021 Quarterfinal	Pohang Steelers (South Korea)	3–0	(Japan) Nagoya Grampus	Jeonju, South Korea
14:00 JST (UTC+9)	Sin.J-h (yellow card) 35'; Go.Y-j (yellow card) 46'; Lim.S-h 53', 90+5'; Lee.S-m 70'	Report		Stadium: Jeonju World Cup Stadium; Attendance: 989; Referee: Alireza Faghani (Iran)

== Squad statistics ==
As of match played 4 December 2021

=== Appearances and goals ===
No.	Pos	Nat	Player	Total		J.League		Emperor's Cup		J.League Cup		Champions League	
No.	Pos	Nat	Player	Apps	Goals	Apps	Goals	Apps	Goals	Apps	Goals	Apps	Goals
1	GK	(Australia) AUS	Mitchell Langerak	54	0	38	0	4	0	5	0	7	0
2	MF	(Japan) JPN	Takuji Yonemoto	39	0	23+5	0	3	0	1+1	0	5+1	0
3	DF	(Japan) JPN	Yuichi Maruyama	17	1	17	1	0	0	0	0	0	0
4	DF	(Japan) JPN	Shinnosuke Nakatani	53	4	34+3	2	3	1	5	0	8	1
5	MF	(Japan) JPN	Kazuki Nagasawa	46	1	13+19	0	3	1	2+3	0	4+2	0
6	DF	(Japan) JPN	Kazuya Miyahara	38	0	20+6	0	2+1	0	2	0	6+1	0
7	MF	(Japan) JPN	Hiroyuki Abe	14	2	4+4	0	1+1	0	0	0	3+1	2
8	FW	(Japan) JPN	Yoichiro Kakitani	52	9	26+10	5	4	0	5	2	4+3	2
9	FW	(Japan) JPN	Ryogo Yamasaki	32	7	14+11	3	0+1	0	0	0	3+3	4
10	FW	(Brazil) BRA	Gabriel Xavier	26	0	10+10	0	0+2	0	0+3	0	0+1	0
11	FW	(Japan) JPN	Yuki Soma	46	3	19+14	2+1	1	0	3+1	0	4+4	0
13	DF	(Japan) JPN	Haruya Fujii	11	1	1+4	0	1+2	1	0	0	1+2	0
14	DF	(Japan) JPN	Yasuki Kimoto	48	1	18+14	0	4	0	4+1	1	6+1	0
15	MF	(Japan) JPN	Sho Inagaki	55	11	37+1	7	4	0	5	4	7+1	0
16	FW	(Brazil) BRA	Mateus	54	14	32+5	7	2+2	2	5	1	6+2	4
17	DF	(Japan) JPN	Ryoya Morishita	38	0	8+14	0	1+3	0	1+4	0	1+6	0
19	FW	(Japan) JPN	Manabu Saitō	33	1	6+18	0	2	0	0+1	0	3+3	1
20	DF	(South Korea) KOR	Kim Min-tae	19	1	12	1	0	0	5	0	2	0
21	GK	(Japan) JPN	Yohei Takeda	1	0	0	0	0	0	0	0	1	0
23	DF	(Japan) JPN	Yutaka Yoshida	54	1	38	1	3	0	5	0	8	0
24	MF	(Japan) JPN	Ryotaro Ishida	3	1	0	0	0+1	1	0	0	0+2	0
25	MF	(Japan) JPN	Naoki Maeda	50	5	22+12	3	2+1	0	5	1	5+3	1
26	DF	(Japan) JPN	Shumpei Naruse	26	0	17+1	0	3	0	2	0	2+1	0
40	FW	(Poland) POL	Jakub Świerczok	21	12	9+5	7	1+1	1	0+3	1	2	3
44	MF	(Japan) JPN	Mu Kanazaki	12	1	0+6	1	0+1	0	0+3	0	0+2	0
Players away on loan:
Players who left Nagoya Grampus during the season:

=== Goal Scorers ===
Place	Position	Nation	Number	Name	J1 League	Emperor's Cup	J.League Cup	Champions League	Total
1	FW	(Brazil)	16	Mateus	7	2	1	4	14
2	FW	(Poland)	40	Jakub Świerczok	7	1	1	3	12
3	MF	(Japan)	15	Sho Inagaki	7	0	4	0	11
4	FW	(Japan)	8	Yoichiro Kakitani	5	0	2	2	9
5	FW	(Japan)	9	Ryogo Yamasaki	3	0	0	4	7
6	MF	(Japan)	25	Naoki Maeda	3	0	1	1	5
7	DF	(Japan)	4	Shinnosuke Nakatani	2	1	0	1	4
7				Own goal	4	0	0	0	4
9	FW	(Japan)	11	Yuki Soma	2	0	0	0	2
9	MF	(Japan)	7	Hiroyuki Abe	0	0	0	2	2
11	DF	(Japan)	3	Yuichi Maruyama	1	0	0	0	1
11	DF	(Japan)	23	Yutaka Yoshida	1	0	0	0	1
11	DF	(South Korea)	20	Kim Min-tae	1	0	0	0	1
11	MF	(Japan)	44	Mu Kanazaki	1	0	0	0	1
11	DF	(Japan)	13	Haruya Fujii	0	1	0	0	1
11	MF	(Japan)	5	Kazuki Nagasawa	0	1	0	0	1
11	MF	(Japan)	24	Ryotaro Ishida	0	1	0	0	1
11	DF	(Japan)	14	Yasuki Kimoto	0	0	1	0	1
11	FW	(Japan)	19	Manabu Saitō	0	0	0	1	1
				TOTALS	44	7	10	18	79

=== Clean sheets ===
Place	Position	Nation	Number	Name	J1 League	Emperor's Cup	J.League Cup	Champions League	Total
1	GK	(Australia)	1	Mitchell Langerak	21	3	3	4	31
TOTALS					21	3	3	4	31

=== Disciplinary record ===
Number	Nation	Position	Name	J1 League		Emperor's Cup		J.League Cup		Champions League		Total	
Number	Nation	Position	Name	Booked	Sent off (straight red)	Booked	Sent off (straight red)	Booked	Sent off (straight red)	Booked	Sent off (straight red)	Booked	Sent off (straight red)
2	(Japan)	MF	Takuji Yonemoto	6	0	0	0	1	0	2	0	9	0
4	(Japan)	DF	Shinnosuke Nakatani	2	0	0	0	0	0	1	0	3	0
5	(Japan)	MF	Kazuki Nagasawa	4	0	0	0	0	0	1	0	5	0
6	(Japan)	DF	Kazuya Miyahara	0	0	0	0	0	0	1	0	1	0
7	(Japan)	MF	Hiroyuki Abe	0	0	0	0	0	0	1	0	1	0
8	(Japan)	FW	Yoichiro Kakitani	4	0	0	0	0	0	0	0	4	0
9	(Japan)	FW	Ryogo Yamasaki	2	0	0	0	0	0	1	0	3	0
11	(Japan)	FW	Yuki Soma	2	0	0	0	0	0	0	0	2	0
14	(Japan)	DF	Yasuki Kimoto	4	0	0	0	0	0	0	0	4	0
15	(Japan)	MF	Sho Inagaki	1	0	0	0	1	0	1	0	3	0
16	(Brazil)	FW	Mateus	2	0	0	0	1	0	1	0	4	0
17	(Japan)	DF	Ryoya Morishita	0	0	0	0	0	0	1	0	1	0
20	(South Korea)	DF	Kim Min-tae	1	0	0	0	1	0	0	0	2	0
23	(Japan)	DF	Yutaka Yoshida	1	0	0	0	0	0	1	0	2	0
26	(Japan)	DF	Shumpei Naruse	2	0	0	0	0	0	1	0	3	0
44	(Japan)	MF	Mu Kanazaki	0	0	0	0	1	0	0	0	1	0
Players away on loan:
Players who left Nagoya Grampus during the season:
			TOTALS	31	0	0	0	2	0	15	0	48	0
