= 2020 Nagoya Grampus season =

Nagoya Grampus
2020 season
- Chairman: Toyo Kato
- Manager: Massimo Ficcadenti
- J1 League: 3rd
- Emperor's Cup: Did not qualify
- J. League Cup: Quarter-final vs FC Tokyo
- Top goalscorer: League: Mateus (9); All: Mateus (11)
| Home colours | Away colours |

The 2020 Nagoya Grampus season was Nagoya Grampus' 3rd season back in the J1 League following their relegation at the end of the 2016 season, their 27th J1 League season and 37th overall in the Japanese top flight. Nagoya Grampus finished the season in Third Position, qualifying for the Play-off Round of the 2021 AFC Champions League. Due to finishing third, Nagoya Grampus did not qualify for the re-formatted 2020 Emperor's Cup, which if a J1 team were to win would put Nagoya Grampus directly into the AFC Champions League Group Stage.

== Season events ==
On 20 December 2019, Massimo Ficcadenti agreed a new contract to manage Nagoya Grampus for the 2020 season. The following day, 21 December 2019, Kazuhiko Chiba signed a new one-year contract with Nagoya Grampus.

On 24 December 2019, Yohei Takeda signed a new one-year contract with Nagoya Grampus, whilst Naoki Maeda extended his contract for the 2020 season the next day.

On 26 December 2019, Mitchell Langerak and Ariajasuru Hasegawa signed a new contracts until the end of the 2020 season.

On 27 December, Shumpei Naruse signed a new contract with Nagoya Grampus for the 2020 season, with Yutaka Yoshida following suit the next day.

On 5 January, Nagoya Grampus announced the signing of Ryogo Yamasaki from Shonan Bellmare, and that Shinnosuke Nakatani had renewed his contract with Nagoya Grampus for the 2020 season. The following day, 6 January, João Schmidt and Ryota Aoki renewed their contracts with Nagoya Grampus for the 2020 season.

On 7 January, Shuto Watanabe and Kosuke Ota renewed there contracts with Nagoya Grampus for the 2020 season, whilst Kazuya Miyahara renewed his contract for the 2020 season on 8 January.

On 9 January, Tsubasa Shibuya renewed his contract with Nagoya Grampus for the 2020 season, Takashi Kanai returned from his loan deal at Sagan Tosu and Jonathan Matsuoka joined ReinMeer Aomori on loan for the 2020 season.

On 25 February, all football scheduled to be played between 28 February and 15 March, was suspended as a result of the COVID-19 pandemic. On 12 March, Nagoya Grampus announced that their upcoming games on 18 March & 22 March, against Yokohama and Urawa Red Diamonds, had also been postponed due to the COVID-19 pandemic. 13 days, 25 March, a further 9 games, scheduled between 3 April and 6 May, where postponed to prevent the spread of Coronavirus. Also on 25 March, Nagoya Grampus announced the signing of Mu Kanazaki on loan from Sagan Tosu until 31 January 2021.

On 2 June, Nagoya Grampus announced that Mu Kanazaki had tested positive for COVID-19, with the club announcing four days later that Mitchell Langerak had also tested positive for COVID-19.

On 5 June, the group stage of the 2020 J.League Cup was reduced from a 6 games to 3 games, resulting in Nagoya Grampus' away games against Kawasaki Frontale and Kashima Antlers, as well as their home game against Shimizu S-Pulse were cancelled.

On 21 June, Nagoya Grampus announced that their contract with Jô had been terminated, and that the matter was with the FIFA after Jô had signed for Corinthians whilst still under contract with Nagoya Grampus.

On 9 July, Nagoya Grampus confirmed the signing of Oh Jae-suk from Gamba Osaka.

On 25 July, Nagoya Grampus announced that Kazuya Miyahara had tested positive for COVID-19. The following day, Shuto Watanabe and coaching staff also tested positive for COVID-19, resulting in the postponement of that afternoon's match between Nagoya Grampus and Sanfrecce Hiroshima.

== Squad ==
As of match played 19 December 2020

| No. | Name | Nationality | Position | Date of birth (age) | Signed from | Signed in | Contract ends | Apps. | Goals |
Goalkeepers
| 1 | Mitchell Langerak | (Australia) | GK | 22 August 1988 (aged 32) | Levante | 2018 | 2020 | 108 | 0 |
| 18 | Tsubasa Shibuya | (Japan) | GK | 27 January 1995 (aged 25) | Yokohama | 2017 | 2020 | 8 | 0 |
| 21 | Yohei Takeda | (Japan) | GK | 30 June 1987 (aged 33) | Oita Trinita | 2016 | 2020 | 38 | 0 |
| 22 | Daiki Mitsui | (Japan) | GK | 27 May 2001 (aged 19) | Academy | 2020 | | 0 | 0 |
Defenders
| 3 | Yuichi Maruyama | (Japan) | DF | 16 June 1989 (aged 31) | FC Tokyo | 2018 | | 88 | 2 |
| 4 | Shinnosuke Nakatani | (Japan) | DF | 24 March 1996 (aged 24) | Kashiwa Reysol | 2018 | 2020 | 95 | 1 |
| 5 | Kazuhiko Chiba | (Japan) | DF | 21 June 1985 (aged 35) | Sanfrecce Hiroshima | 2019 | 2020 | 7 | 0 |
| 6 | Kazuya Miyahara | (Japan) | DF | 22 March 1996 (aged 24) | Sanfrecce Hiroshima | 2019 | 2020 | 116 | 4 |
| 13 | Haruya Fujii | (Japan) | DF | 26 December 2000 (aged 19) | Academy | 2018 | | 11 | 0 |
| 23 | Yutaka Yoshida | (Japan) | DF | 17 February 1990 (aged 30) | Sagan Tosu | 2019 | 2020 | 66 | 2 |
| 26 | Shumpei Naruse | (Japan) | DF | 17 January 2001 (aged 19) | Academy | 2018 | 2020 | 36 | 0 |
| 28 | Akira Yoshida | (Japan) | DF | 9 July 2001 (aged 19) | Academy | 2020 | | 0 | 0 |
| 36 | Kosuke Ota | (Japan) | DF | 23 July 1987 (aged 33) | FC Tokyo | 2019 | 2020 | 26 | 0 |
Midfielders
| 2 | Takuji Yonemoto | (Japan) | MF | 3 December 1990 (aged 30) | Tokyo | 2019 | | 59 | 1 |
| 8 | João Schmidt | (Brazil) | MF | 19 May 1993 (aged 27) | Atalanta | 2019 | 2020 | 62 | 3 |
| 9 | Ariajasuru Hasegawa | (Japan) | MF | 29 October 1988 (aged 32) | Omiya Ardija | 2018 | 2020 | 62 | 6 |
| 11 | Hiroyuki Abe | (Japan) | MF | 5 July 1989 (aged 31) | Kawasaki Frontale | 2020 | | 29 | 4 |
| 14 | Yosuke Akiyama | (Japan) | MF | 13 April 1995 (aged 25) | Academy | 2017 | | 44 | 1 |
| 15 | Sho Inagaki | (Japan) | MF | 25 December 1991 (aged 28) | Sanfrecce Hiroshima | 2020 | | 37 | 3 |
| 19 | Ryota Aoki | (Japan) | MF | 6 March 1996 (aged 24) | Academy | 2014 | 2020 | 59 | 14 |
| 20 | Shuto Watanabe | (Japan) | MF | 28 January 1997 (aged 23) | Academy | 2019 | 2020 | 0 | 0 |
| 24 | Ryotaro Ishida | (Japan) | MF | 13 December 2001 (aged 19) | Academy | 2018 | | 9 | 0 |
| 34 | Oh Jae-suk | (Korea) | MF | 4 January 1990 (aged 30) | Gamba Osaka | 2020 | | 23 | 0 |
| 44 | Mu Kanazaki | (Japan) | MF | 16 February 1989 (aged 31) | loan from Sagan Tosu | 2020 | 2021 | 123 | 21 |
Forwards
| 10 | Gabriel Xavier | (Brazil) | FW | 15 July 1993 (aged 27) | Cruzeiro | 2018 | | 111 | 22 |
| 16 | Mateus | (Brazil) | FW | 11 September 1994 (aged 26) | Omiya Ardija | 2019 | 2020 | 51 | 15 |
| 17 | Ryogo Yamasaki | (Japan) | FW | 20 September 1992 (aged 28) | Shonan Bellmare | 2020 | | 30 | 2 |
| 25 | Naoki Maeda | (Japan) | FW | 17 November 1995 (aged 25) | Matsumoto Yamaga | 2018 | 2020 | 91 | 23 |
| 27 | Yuki Soma | (Japan) | FW | 25 February 1997 (aged 23) | Academy | 2018 | | 68 | 8 |
Unregistered
| | Ryutaro Ishida | (Japan) | MF | | Academy | 2018 | | 1 | 0 |
| | Shunto Kodama | (Japan) | MF | 3 December 1999 (aged 21) | Academy | 2018 | | 10 | 1 |
Away on loan
| 24 | Yukinari Sugawara | (Japan) | DF | 28 June 2000 (aged 20) | Academy | 2018 | | 26 | 0 |
| 28 | Daiki Enomoto | (Japan) | MF | 21 June 1996 (aged 24) | Academy | 2018 | | 11 | 0 |
| 37 | Shumpei Fukahori | (Japan) | MF | 29 June 1998 (aged 22) | Academy | 2016 | | 13 | 3 |
| | Koki Sugimori | (Japan) | MF | 5 April 1997 (aged 23) | Academy | 2014 | | 52 | 3 |
| | Yuki Ogaki | (Japan) | FW | 28 February 2000 (aged 20) | Academy | 2017 | | 3 | 0 |
| | Jonathan Matsuoka | (Paraguay) | FW | 27 May 2000 (aged 20) | Academy | 2019 | | 0 | 0 |
Left during the season
| 7 | Jô | (Brazil) | FW | 20 March 1987 (aged 33) | Corinthians | 2018 | | 74 | 33 |

=== Out on loan ===
Note: Flags indicate national team as defined under FIFA eligibility rules; some limited exceptions apply. Players may hold more than one non-FIFA nationality.

| No. / Pos. / Nation / Player; 28 / MF / JPN / Daiki Enomoto (at Tokushima Vortis until 31 January 2021) | No. / Pos. / Nation / Player; 37 / MF / JPN / Shumpei Fukahori (at Mito HollyHock until 31 January 2021) |

== Transfers ==
=== In ===
| Date | Position | Nationality | Name | From | Fee | Ref. |
|---|---|---|---|---|---|---|
| 27 December 2019 | MF | (Japan) | Sho Inagaki | Sanfrecce Hiroshima | Undisclosed | |
| 30 December 2019 | MF | (Japan) | Hiroyuki Abe | Kawasaki Frontale | Undisclosed | |
| 9 July 2020 | MF | (South Korea) | Oh Jae-suk | Gamba Osaka | Undisclosed | |

=== Out ===
| Date | Position | Nationality | Name | To | Fee | Ref. |
|---|---|---|---|---|---|---|
| 24 December 2019 | DF | (Japan) | Ikki Arai | JEF United Chiba | Undisclosed | |
| 25 December 2019 | DF | (Japan) | Kazuki Kushibiki | Sanfrecce Hiroshima | Undisclosed | |
| 4 January 2020 | MF | (Japan) | Ryuji Izumi | Kashima Antlers | Undisclosed | |
| 19 January 2020 | DF | (Japan) | Takashi Kanai | Shimizu S-Pulse | Undisclosed | |

=== Loans in ===
| Date from | Position | Nationality | Name | From | Date to | Ref. |
|---|---|---|---|---|---|---|
| 25 March 2020 | MF | (Japan) | Mu Kanazaki | Sagan Tosu | 31 January 2021 | |

=== Loans out ===
| Date from | Position | Nationality | Name | To | Date to | Ref. |
|---|---|---|---|---|---|---|
| 27 December 2019 | MF | (Japan) | Daiki Enomoto | Tokushima Vortis | 31 January 2021 | |
| 28 December 2019 | MF | (Japan) | Shumpei Fukahori | Mito HollyHock | 31 January 2021 | |
| 9 January 2020 | FW | (Paraguay) | Jonathan Matsuoka | ReinMeer Aomori | 31 January 2021 | |

=== Released ===
| Date | Position | Nationality | Name | Joined | Date | Ref. |
|---|---|---|---|---|---|---|
| 12 February 2020 | MF | (Brazil) | Eduardo Neto | | | |
| 21 June 2020 | FW | (Brazil) | Jô | Corinthians | 17 June 2020 | |
| 31 December 2020 | DF | (Japan) | Kazuhiko Chiba | Albirex Niigata | | |
| 31 December 2020 | DF | (Japan) | Kosuke Ota | Perth Glory | | |

== Friendlies ==
| 6 February 2020 | Persita Tangerang (Indonesia) | Cancelled | (Japan) Nagoya Grampus | Tangerang, Indonesia |
| 17:30 JST (UTC+9) | | | | Stadium: Benteng Taruna Stadium |

| 8 February 2020 | Nagoya Grampus (Japan) | Cancelled | (Japan) Omiya Ardija | Tangerang, Indonesia |
| 20:30 JST (UTC+9) | | | | Stadium: Benteng Taruna Stadium |

| 10 February 2020 | Nagoya Grampus (Japan) | Cancelled | Indonesia U-18 | Jakarta, Indonesia |
| 21:00 JST (UTC+9) | | | | Stadium: PTIK Stadium |

| 4 March 2020 | Nagoya Grampus U-18 (Japan) | v | Indonesia U-18 | Nagoya, Japan |
| JST (UTC+9) | | | | Stadium: Paloma Mizuho Stadium |

| 20 March 2020 | Nagoya Grampus | v | (South Korea) Korea University | Toyota, Japan |
| JST (UTC+9) | | | | Stadium: Toyota Stadium |

| 15 March 2020 2020 Gubernur Banten Cup - Group A | Persita Tangerang U-18 (Indonesia) | v | Nagoya Grampus U-18 | Tangerang, Banten |
| 17:30 JST (UTC+9) | | | | Stadium: Benteng Taruna Stadium |

| 17 March 2020 2020 Gubernur Banten Cup - Group A | Fagiano Okayama U-18 | v | Nagoya Grampus U-18 | Tangerang, Banten |
| 17:30 JST (UTC+9) | | | | Stadium: Benteng Taruna Stadium |

| 19 March 2020 2020 Gubernur Banten Cup - Group A | Nagoya Grampus U-18 | v | (Indonesia) Persib Bandung U-18 | Tangerang, Banten |
| 17:30 JST (UTC+9) | | | | Stadium: Benteng Taruna Stadium |

== Competitions ==
=== J. League ===
==== Results summary ====
| Overall | | | | | | | | Home | | | | | | Away | | | | | |
| Pld | W | D | L | GF | GA | GD | Pts | W | D | L | GF | GA | GD | W | D | L | GF | GA | GD |
|---|---|---|---|---|---|---|---|---|---|---|---|---|---|---|---|---|---|---|---|
| 34 | 19 | 6 | 9 | 45 | 28 | +17 | 63 | 12 | 3 | 2 | 28 | 12 | +16 | 7 | 3 | 7 | 17 | 16 | +1 |

Last updated: 19 December 2020.
Source: see below

==== Results by round ====
| Round | 1 | 2 | 3 | 4 | 5 | 6 | 7 | 8 | 9 | 10 | 11 | 12 | 13 | 14 | 15 | 16 | 17 | 18 | 19 | 20 | 21 | 22 | 23 | 24 | 25 | 26 | 27 | 28 | 29 | 30 | 31 | 32 | 33 | 34 |
|---|---|---|---|---|---|---|---|---|---|---|---|---|---|---|---|---|---|---|---|---|---|---|---|---|---|---|---|---|---|---|---|---|---|---|
| Ground | A | A | H | A | H | A | H | H | A | A | H | A | H | H | A | H | A | H | A | A | H | H | A | A | H | A | A | A | H | H | H | A | H | H |
| Result | D | W | D | W | W | W | L | W | L | W | W | D | L | W | L | W | L | W | L | W | W | W | L | L | W | W | D | L | W | W | D | W | D | W |
| Position | 7 | 4 | 8 | 5 | 4 | 2 | 5 | 3 | 5 | 3 | 3 | 3 | 4 | 4 | 4 | 4 | 6 | 5 | 5 | 5 | 5 | 4 | 5 | 5 | 5 | 3 | 3 | 4 | 3 | 3 | 3 | 3 | 3 | 3 |

Updated to match(es) played on 19 December 2020. Source: See Below
A = Away; H = Home; W = Win; D = Draw; L = Loss

==== Results ====
| 22 February 2020 1 | Vegalta Sendai | 1 – 1 | Nagoya Grampus | Sendai |
| 14:00 JST (UTC+9) | Mate 18'; Hiraoka (yellow card) 58' | Report | Abe 34'; Yonemoto (yellow card) 86' | Stadium: Yurtec Stadium Sendai; Attendance: 13,968; Referee: Akihiko Ikeuchi |

| 4 July 2020 2 | Shimizu S-Pulse | 1 – 2 | Nagoya Grampus | Shizuoka |
| 18:00 JST (UTC+9) | Kanai (yellow card) 6'; Okui (yellow card) 17'; Kaneko 18'; Valdo (yellow card) 90+5' | Report | Soma 32' (yellow card) 65' (yellow-red card) 90+6'; Valdo 40' (o.g.) | Stadium: IAI Stadium Nihondaira; Referee: Shinji Murakami |

| 8 July 2020 3 | Nagoya Grampus | 2 – 2 | Gamba Osaka | Toyota |
| 19:30 JST (UTC+9) | Yonemoto (yellow card) 3'; Mateus 16'; Gabriel Xavier 31'; Inagaki (yellow card) 70' | Report | Miura 6'; Watanabe 90+2' | Stadium: Toyota Stadium; Referee: Yudai Yamamoto |
Note: Match originally scheduled for 11 April, but postponed due to the COVID-19 pandemic.

| 12 July 2020 4 | Cerezo Osaka | 0 – 2 | Nagoya Grampus | Osaka |
| 19:00 JST (UTC+9) | Mineiro (yellow card) 57'; Sakamoto (yellow card) 69' | Report | Jonjić 38' (o.g.); Abe 61'; Maruyama (yellow card) 87' | Stadium: Yanmar Stadium Nagai; Attendance: 4,026; Referee: Shinji Murakami |
Note: Match originally scheduled for 29 April, but postponed due to the COVID-19 pandemic.

| 18 July 2020 5 | Nagoya Grampus | 1 – 0 | Sagan Tosu | Toyota |
| 18:00 JST (UTC+9) | Nakatani (yellow card) 55'; Maeda 62'; Y.Yoshida (yellow card) 83' | Report | Toyoda (yellow card) 55'; Tiago Alves (yellow card) 64' (yellow-red card) 83' | Stadium: Toyota Stadium; Referee: Yoshiro Imamura |

| 22 July 2020 6 | Oita Trinita | 0 – 3 | Nagoya Grampus | Ōita |
| 19:30 JST (UTC+9) | T.Tanaka (yellow card) 47'; Inoue (yellow card) 72' | Report | Yoshida 31'; Chinen 48' (o.g.); Yonemoto 73' | Stadium: Showa Denko Dome Oita; Referee: Koichiro Fukushima |
Note: Match originally scheduled for 8 March, but postponed due to the COVID-19 pandemic.

| 1 August 2020 8 | Nagoya Grampus | 0 – 1 | Kashiwa Reysol | Toyota |
| 18:00 JST (UTC+9) | Inagaki (yellow card) 32'; Schmidt (yellow card) 53' | Report | Yamashita (yellow card) 23'; Nakamura (yellow card) 29'; Olunga 71' | Stadium: Toyota Stadium; Referee: Yudai Yamamoto |
Note: Match originally scheduled for 3 May, but postponed due to the COVID-19 pandemic.

| 8 August 2020 9 | Nagoya Grampus | 6 – 2 | Urawa Red Diamonds | Toyota |
| 18:00 JST (UTC+9) | Maeda 9', 10', 38', 50'; Schmidt 18'; Gabriel Xavier 45' | Report | Yuruki (yellow card) 30'; Leonardo 48', 76' | Stadium: Toyota Stadium; Referee: Masaaki Toma |
Note: Match originally scheduled for 22 March, but postponed due to the COVID-19 pandemic.

| 15 August 2020 10 | FC Tokyo | 1 – 0 | Nagoya Grampus | Tokyo |
| 19:00 JST (UTC+9) | Leandro 33'; Adaílton (penalty missed) 90+4' | Report | Naruse (yellow card) 62' (yellow-red card) 82'; Langerak (yellow card) 90+4' | Stadium: Ajinomoto Stadium; Referee: Yusuke Araki |

| 19 August 2020 11 | Shonan Bellmare | 0 – 1 | Nagoya Grampus | Hiratsuka |
| 19:00 JST (UTC+9) | Okamoto (yellow card) 90+1' | Report | Mateus (yellow card) 82'; Saito 90+2' (o.g.) | Stadium: Shonan BMW Stadium Hiratsuka; Referee: Shinji Murakami |

| 23 August 2020 12 | Nagoya Grampus | 1 – 0 | Kawasaki Frontale | Toyota |
| 18:00 JST (UTC+9) | Kanazaki 44'; Langerak (yellow card) 90+4' | Report | | Stadium: Toyota Stadium; Referee: Ryuji Sato |

| 29 August 2020 13 | Hokkaido Consadole Sapporo | 0 – 0 | Nagoya Grampus | Sapporo |
| 18:00 JST (UTC+9) | Kim (yellow card) 65'; Miyazawa (yellow card) 77'; Fernandes (penalty missed) 90+7' | Report | | Stadium: Sapporo Dome; Referee: Yuichi Nishimura |
Note: Match originally scheduled for 18 April, but postponed due to the COVID-19 pandemic.

| 5 September 2020 14 | Nagoya Grampus | 1 – 3 | Kashima Antlers | Toyota |
| 18:00 JST (UTC+9) | Inagaki (yellow card) 40' (goal) 49'; Abe (yellow card) 83' | Report | Izumi 16'; Misao (yellow card) 35'; Araki 37'; Doi 63' | Stadium: Toyota Stadium; Referee: Koichiro Fukushima |
Note: Match originally scheduled for 14 March, but postponed due to the COVID-19 pandemic.

| 9 September 2020 15 | Nagoya Grampus | 2 – 1 | Yokohama F. Marinos | Nagoya |
| 19:30 JST (UTC+9) | Gabriel Xavier 24' (yellow card) 85'; Soma (yellow card) 67'; Mateus 74' | Report | Júnior Santos 1' (yellow card) 45+1'; Marcos Júnior (yellow card) 65'; Kida (yellow card) 90+3' | Stadium: Paloma Mizuho Stadium; Referee: Yudai Yamamoto |

| 13 September 2020 16 | Yokohama | 3 – 2 | Nagoya Grampus | Yokohama |
| 18:00 JST (UTC+9) | Saito 19'; Shichi 22'; Senuma 78' | Report | Yoshida 12'; Mateus 73' | Stadium: NHK Spring Mitsuzawa Football Stadium; Referee: Masaaki Toma |
Note: Match originally scheduled for 18 March, but postponed due to the COVID-19 pandemic.

| 19 September 2020 17 | Nagoya Grampus | 2 – 1 | Vissel Kobe | Toyota |
| 17:00 JST (UTC+9) | Kanazaki 42' (pen.), 56' (pen.) | Report | Yamaguchi 15'; Osaki (yellow card) 41'; Nishi (yellow card) 64'; Maekawa (yellow card) 68'; Samper (yellow card) 68' | Stadium: Toyota Stadium; Referee: Nobutsugu Murakami |
Note: Match originally scheduled for 26 April, but postponed due to the COVID-19 pandemic.

| 23 September 2020 18 | Gamba Osaka | 2 – 1 | Nagoya Grampus | Suita |
| 19:00 JST (UTC+9) | Takao (yellow card) 35'; Yamamoto 53'; Usami 87' | Report | Kanazaki 21'; Yonemoto (yellow card) 41'; Nakatani (yellow card) 50'; Oh (yellow card) 79' | Stadium: Panasonic Stadium Suita; Referee: Hajime Matsuo |

| 26 September 2020 19 | Nagoya Grampus | 3 – 1 | Shimizu S-Pulse | Toyota |
| 14:00 JST (UTC+9) | Abe 2'; Maeda 25'; Maruyama 74' | Report | Renato (yellow card) 77'; Carlinhos 88' | Stadium: Toyota Stadium; Referee: Minoru Tojo |

| 30 September 2020 29 | Vissel Kobe | 1 – 0 | Nagoya Grampus | Kobe |
| 19:00 JST (UTC+9) | Douglas (yellow card) 19'; Iniesta 60' | Report | Yamasaki (yellow card) 87' | Stadium: Noevir Stadium Kobe; Referee: Ryuji Sato |

| 4 October 2020 20 | Urawa Red Diamonds | 0 – 1 | Nagoya Grampus | Saitama |
| 17:00 JST (UTC+9) | Ugajin (yellow card) 51'; Deng (red card) 85'; Leonardo (yellow card) 85' | Report | Kanazaki 54'; Mateus (yellow card) 78' | Stadium: Saitama Stadium 2002; Referee: Yusuke Araki |

| 10 October 2020 21 | Nagoya Grampus | 1 – 0 | Cerezo Osaka | Nagoya |
| 14:00 JST (UTC+9) | Abe (yellow card) 72'; Mateus 90+1' | Report | | Stadium: Paloma Mizuho Stadium; Referee: Masaaki Toma |

| 14 October 2020 22 | Nagoya Grampus | 3 – 0 | Hokkaido Consadole Sapporo | Nagoya |
| 19:30 JST (UTC+9) | Yamasaki 10'; Mateus 44'; Soma (yellow card) 60'; Inagaki 79' | Report | Tanaka (yellow card) 85'; Kim (yellow card) 90+3' | Stadium: Paloma Mizuho Stadium; Referee: Yudai Yamamoto |

| 18 October 2020 23 | Kawasaki Frontale | 3 – 0 | Nagoya Grampus | Kawasaki |
| 19:00 JST (UTC+9) | Mitoma 44'; Nakatani 57' (o.g.); Jesiel 65' | Report | Kanazaki (yellow card) 90' | Stadium: Kawasaki Todoroki Stadium; Referee: Hiroyoshi Takayama |

| 21 October 2020 33 | Yokohama F. Marinos | 2 – 1 | Nagoya Grampus | Yokohama |
| 19:30 JST (UTC+9) | Edigar Junio 41'; Watanabe 80' | Report | Mateus 69'; Schmidt (yellow card) 90+6' | Stadium: Nissan Stadium; Referee: Minoru Tojo |
Note: Match originally scheduled for 4 April, but postponed due to the COVID-19 pandemic.

| 24 October 2020 24 | Nagoya Grampus | 1 – 0 | Vegalta Sendai | Nagoya |
| 14:00 JST (UTC+9) | Inagaki 65' | Report | | Stadium: Paloma Mizuho Stadium; Referee: Nobutsugu Murakami |

| 31 October 2020 25 | Kashima Antlers | 0 – 2 | Nagoya Grampus | Kashima |
| 17:00 JST (UTC+9) | Léo Silva (yellow card) 10'; Everaldo (yellow card) 45+3'; Juan Alano (yellow card) 61' (yellow-red card) 68' | Report | Kanazaki 7' (pen.); Naruse (yellow card) 70'; Abe (yellow card) 82'; Mateus 90+2' | Stadium: Kashima Soccer Stadium; Referee: Yusuke Araki |

| 3 November 2020 26 | Sagan Tosu | 0 – 0 | Nagoya Grampus | Tosu |
| 13:00 JST (UTC+9) | | Report | Gabriel Xavier (red card) 84' | Stadium: Ekimae Real Estate Stadium; Referee: Akihiko Ikeuchi |

| 11 November 2020 7 | Sanfrecce Hiroshima | 2 – 0 | Nagoya Grampus | Hiroshima |
| 19:00 JST (UTC+9) | Leandro Pereira 16'; Aoyama (yellow card) 40'; Morishima 79' | Report | Nakatani (yellow card) 57' | Stadium: Edion Stadium Hiroshima; Referee: Yoshiro Imamura |
Note: Match originally scheduled for 26 July, but postponed on the same day.

| 15 November 2020 27 | Nagoya Grampus | 1 – 0 | Tokyo | Toyota |
| 19:00 JST (UTC+9) | Gabriel Xavier (yellow card) 29'; Maeda (yellow card) 82'; Mateus 90+5' (pen.) | Report | Morishige (yellow card) 36' | Stadium: Toyota Stadium; Referee: Hajime Matsuo |

| 21 November 2020 28 | Nagoya Grampus | 3 – 1 | Shonan Bellmare | Toyota |
| 17:00 JST (UTC+9) | Mateus 11'; Abe 51'; Gabriel Xavier 56' | Report | Saka 17'; Tachi (yellow card) 68' | Stadium: Toyota Stadium; Referee: Koichiro Fukushima |

| 28 November 2020 29 | Nagoya Grampus | 0 – 0 | Oita Trinita | Nagoya |
| 14:00 JST (UTC+9) | | Report | Hasegawa (yellow card) 45'; Suzuki (yellow card) 90+3' | Stadium: Paloma Mizuho Stadium; Referee: Yudai Yamamoto |

| 5 December 2020 32 | Kashiwa Reysol | 0 – 1 | Nagoya Grampus | Kashiwa |
| 14:00 JST (UTC+9) | Ominami (yellow card) 76' | Report | Soma 51'; Maruyama (yellow card) 90' | Stadium: Sankyo Frontier Kashiwa Stadium; Referee: Yusuke Araki |

| 12 December 2020 33 | Nagoya Grampus | 0 – 0 | Yokohama | Nagoya |
| 14:00 JST (UTC+9) | Gabriel Xavier (red card) 82' | Report | Tezuka (yellow card) 90+3' | Stadium: Paloma Mizuho Stadium; Referee: Akihiko Ikeuchi |

| 19 December 2020 34 | Nagoya Grampus | 1 – 0 | Sanfrecce Hiroshima | Toyota |
| 14:00 JST (UTC+9) | Maeda 86' | Report | | Stadium: Toyota Stadium; Referee: Koichiro Fukushima |

==== League table ====
| Pos | Team | Pld | W | D | L | GF | GA | GD | Pts | Qualification or relegation |
|---|---|---|---|---|---|---|---|---|---|---|
| 1 | Kawasaki Frontale (C) | 34 | 26 | 5 | 3 | 88 | 31 | +57 | 83 | Qualification for AFC Champions League group stage (Note: Since the winners of the 2020 Emperor's Cup, Kawasaki Frontale, qualified for the Champions League group stage, the spot given to the Emperor's Cup winners (Champions League group stage) was passed to the third-placed team and the spot given to the third-place team (Champions League play-off round) was passed to the fourth-placed team.) |
| 2 | Gamba Osaka | 34 | 20 | 5 | 9 | 46 | 42 | +4 | 65 | Qualification for AFC Champions League group stage |
| 3 | Nagoya Grampus | 34 | 19 | 6 | 9 | 45 | 28 | +17 | 63 | Qualification for AFC Champions League group stage |
| 4 | Cerezo Osaka | 34 | 18 | 6 | 10 | 46 | 37 | +9 | 60 | Qualification for AFC Champions League play-off round |
| 5 | Kashima Antlers | 34 | 18 | 5 | 11 | 55 | 44 | +11 | 59 | |

Source: J.League Data Site
Rules for classification: 1) Points; 2) Goal difference; 3) Head-to-head points; 4) Head-to-head goal difference; 5) Head-to-head goal scored; 6) Number of wins; 7) Goals scored; 8) Fair-play points.
(C) Champions

=== J. League Cup ===
==== Group stage ====
| 16 February 2020 1 | Nagoya Grampus | 1 – 0 | Kashima Antlers | Nagoya |
| 14:00 JST (UTC+9) | Abe (yellow card) 40'; Mateus 43'; Maeda (yellow card) 86' | Report | Misao (yellow card) 42'; Y.Matsumura (red card) 90' | Stadium: Paloma Mizuho Stadium; Attendance: 9,364; Referee: Futoshi Nakamura |

| 26 February 2020 2 | Nagoya Grampus | v | Shimizu S-Pulse | Nagoya |
| JST (UTC+9) | | | | Stadium: Paloma Mizuho Stadium |
Note: Match cancelled due to the COVID-19 pandemic on 5 June.

| 4 March 2020 3 | Kawasaki Frontale | v | Nagoya Grampus | Kawasaki |
| JST (UTC+9) | | | | Stadium: Kawasaki Todoroki Stadium |
Note: Match cancelled due to the COVID-19 pandemic on 5 June.

| 6 May 2020 6 | Kashima Antlers | v | Nagoya Grampus | Kashima |
| JST (UTC+9) | | | | Stadium: Kashima Soccer Stadium |
Note: Match cancelled due to the COVID-19 pandemic on 5 June.

| 5 August 2020 4 | Shimizu S-Pulse | 0 – 3 | Nagoya Grampus | Shizuoka |
| 19:00 JST (UTC+9) | Dutra (yellow card) 45+1'; Kanai (yellow card) 60'; Okui (yellow card) 72' | Report | Schmidt (yellow card) 39'; Maruyama 45+3'; Mateus 54'; Yamasaki (yellow card) 58' (goal) 90+2' | Stadium: IAI Stadium Nihondaira; Referee: Shinji Murakami |
Note: Match originally scheduled for 8 April 2020, but postponed due to the COVID-19 pandemic.

| 12 August 2020 5 | Nagoya Grampus | 2 – 2 | Kawasaki Frontale | Nagoya |
| 19:00 JST (UTC+9) | Soma 1'; Gabriel Xavier 7'; Nakatani (yellow card) 39' | Report | Mitoma 6', 38'; Oshima (yellow card) 30' (yellow-red card) 71'; Yamane (yellow card) 52'; Tanaka (yellow card) 89' | Stadium: Paloma Mizuho Stadium; Referee: Akihiko Ikeuchi |
Note: Match originally scheduled for 22 April 2020, but postponed due to the COVID-19 pandemic.

==== Knockout stage ====
| 2 September 2020 Quarter-final | FC Tokyo | 3 – 0 | Nagoya Grampus | Tokyo |
| 19:00 JST (UTC+9) | Arthur Silva (yellow card) 19'; Abe 37', 53'; Adaílton 76' | Report | Oh (yellow card) 30'; Nakatani (yellow card) 60'; Yonemoto (yellow card) 81' | Stadium: Ajinomoto Stadium; Referee: Minoru Tojo |

=== Emperor's Cup ===
| 2020 | v |
| JST (UTC+9) |

== Squad statistics ==
As of match played 19 December 2020

=== Appearances and goals ===
| No. | Pos | Nat | Player | Total | | J-League | | Emperor's Cup | | J-League Cup | |
| No. | Pos | Nat | Player | Apps | Goals | Apps | Goals | Apps | Goals | Apps | Goals |
|---|---|---|---|---|---|---|---|---|---|---|---|
| 1 | GK | (Australia) AUS | Mitchell Langerak | 38 | 0 | 34 | 0 | 0 | 0 | 4 | 0 |
| 2 | MF | (Japan) JPN | Takuji Yonemoto | 29 | 1 | 25+2 | 1 | 0 | 0 | 1+1 | 0 |
| 3 | DF | (Japan) JPN | Yuichi Maruyama | 38 | 2 | 34 | 1 | 0 | 0 | 4 | 1 |
| 4 | DF | (Japan) JPN | Shinnosuke Nakatani | 38 | 0 | 34 | 0 | 0 | 0 | 3+1 | 0 |
| 6 | DF | (Japan) JPN | Kazuya Miyahara | 5 | 0 | 2+3 | 0 | 0 | 0 | 0 | 0 |
| 8 | MF | (Brazil) BRA | João Schmidt | 27 | 1 | 9+15 | 1 | 0 | 0 | 2+1 | 0 |
| 10 | FW | (Brazil) BRA | Gabriel Xavier | 28 | 5 | 14+11 | 4 | 0 | 0 | 1+2 | 1 |
| 11 | MF | (Japan) JPN | Hiroyuki Abe | 29 | 4 | 23+4 | 4 | 0 | 0 | 1+1 | 0 |
| 13 | DF | (Japan) JPN | Haruya Fujii | 2 | 0 | 0+1 | 0 | 0 | 0 | 1 | 0 |
| 14 | MF | (Japan) JPN | Yosuke Akiyama | 5 | 0 | 0+3 | 0 | 0 | 0 | 1+1 | 0 |
| 15 | MF | (Japan) JPN | Sho Inagaki | 38 | 3 | 34 | 3 | 0 | 0 | 3+1 | 0 |
| 16 | FW | (Brazil) BRA | Mateus | 38 | 11 | 33+1 | 9 | 0 | 0 | 4 | 2 |
| 17 | FW | (Japan) JPN | Ryogo Yamasaki | 29 | 2 | 6+19 | 1 | 0 | 0 | 3+1 | 1 |
| 19 | MF | (Japan) JPN | Ryota Aoki | 3 | 0 | 0+1 | 0 | 0 | 0 | 1+1 | 0 |
| 23 | DF | (Japan) JPN | Yutaka Yoshida | 33 | 2 | 29+1 | 2 | 0 | 0 | 3 | 0 |
| 24 | MF | (Japan) JPN | Ryotaro Ishida | 9 | 0 | 0+7 | 0 | 0 | 0 | 0+2 | 0 |
| 25 | FW | (Japan) JPN | Naoki Maeda | 33 | 7 | 23+7 | 7 | 0 | 0 | 3 | 0 |
| 26 | DF | (Japan) JPN | Shumpei Naruse | 28 | 0 | 18+7 | 0 | 0 | 0 | 2+1 | 0 |
| 27 | FW | (Japan) JPN | Yuki Soma | 35 | 3 | 15+16 | 2 | 0 | 0 | 4 | 1 |
| 34 | MF | (South Korea) KOR | Oh Jae-suk | 23 | 0 | 16+6 | 0 | 0 | 0 | 1 | 0 |
| 36 | DF | (Japan) JPN | Kosuke Ota | 12 | 0 | 3+6 | 0 | 0 | 0 | 2+1 | 0 |
| 44 | MF | (Japan) JPN | Mu Kanazaki | 26 | 6 | 22+3 | 6 | 0 | 0 | 0+1 | 0 |
Players away on loan:
Players who left Nagoya Grampus during the season:

=== Goal Scorers ===
| Place | Position | Nation | Number | Name | J-League | Emperor's Cup | J-League Cup | Total |
|---|---|---|---|---|---|---|---|---|
| 1 | FW | (Brazil) | 16 | Mateus | 9 | 0 | 2 | 11 |
| 2 | FW | (Japan) | 25 | Naoki Maeda | 7 | 0 | 0 | 7 |
| 3 | MF | (Japan) | 44 | Mu Kanazaki | 6 | 0 | 0 | 6 |
| 4 | FW | (Brazil) | 10 | Gabriel Xavier | 4 | 0 | 1 | 5 |
| 5 | MF | (Japan) | 11 | Hiroyuki Abe | 4 | 0 | 0 | 4 |
| 5 | | | | Own goal | 4 | 0 | 0 | 4 |
| 7 | MF | (Japan) | 15 | Sho Inagaki | 3 | 0 | 0 | 3 |
| 7 | FW | (Japan) | 27 | Yuki Soma | 2 | 0 | 1 | 3 |
| 9 | DF | (Japan) | 23 | Yutaka Yoshida | 2 | 0 | 0 | 2 |
| 9 | DF | (Japan) | 3 | Yuichi Maruyama | 1 | 0 | 1 | 2 |
| 9 | FW | (Japan) | 17 | Ryogo Yamasaki | 1 | 0 | 1 | 2 |
| 12 | MF | (Japan) | 2 | Takuji Yonemoto | 1 | 0 | 0 | 1 |
| 12 | MF | (Brazil) | 8 | João Schmidt | 1 | 0 | 0 | 1 |
| | | | | TOTALS | 45 | 0 | 6 | 51 |

=== Clean sheets ===
| Place | Position | Nation | Number | Name | J-League | Emperor's Cup | J-League Cup | Total |
|---|---|---|---|---|---|---|---|---|
| 1 | GK | (Australia) | 1 | Mitchell Langerak | 16 | 0 | 2 | 18 |
| TOTALS | | | | | 16 | 0 | 2 | 18 |

=== Disciplinary record ===
| Number | Nation | Position | Name | J-League | | J. League Cup | | Emperor's Cup | | Total | |
| Number | Nation | Position | Name | Booked | Sent off (straight red) | Booked | Sent off (straight red) | Booked | Sent off (straight red) | Booked | Sent off (straight red) |
| 1 | (Australia) | GK | Mitchell Langerak | 2 | 0 | 0 | 0 | 0 | 0 | 2 | 0 |
| 2 | (Japan) | MF | Takuji Yonemoto | 3 | 0 | 0 | 0 | 1 | 0 | 4 | 0 |
| 3 | (Japan) | DF | Yuichi Maruyama | 2 | 0 | 0 | 0 | 0 | 0 | 2 | 0 |
| 4 | (Japan) | DF | Shinnosuke Nakatani | 3 | 0 | 0 | 0 | 2 | 0 | 5 | 0 |
| 8 | (Brazil) | MF | João Schmidt | 2 | 0 | 0 | 0 | 1 | 0 | 3 | 0 |
| 10 | (Brazil) | FW | Gabriel Xavier | 2 | 2 | 0 | 0 | 0 | 0 | 2 | 2 |
| 11 | (Japan) | MF | Hiroyuki Abe | 3 | 0 | 0 | 0 | 1 | 0 | 4 | 0 |
| 15 | (Japan) | MF | Sho Inagaki | 3 | 0 | 0 | 0 | 0 | 0 | 3 | 0 |
| 16 | (Brazil) | FW | Mateus | 2 | 0 | 0 | 0 | 0 | 0 | 2 | 0 |
| 17 | (Japan) | FW | Ryogo Yamasaki | 1 | 0 | 0 | 0 | 1 | 0 | 2 | 0 |
| 23 | (Japan) | DF | Yutaka Yoshida | 1 | 0 | 0 | 0 | 0 | 0 | 1 | 0 |
| 25 | (Japan) | FW | Naoki Maeda | 1 | 0 | 0 | 0 | 1 | 0 | 2 | 0 |
| 26 | (Japan) | DF | Shumpei Naruse | 3 | 1 | 0 | 0 | 0 | 0 | 3 | 1 |
| 27 | (Japan) | FW | Yuki Soma | 4 | 1 | 0 | 0 | 0 | 0 | 4 | 1 |
| 34 | (South Korea) | MF | Oh Jae-suk | 1 | 0 | 0 | 0 | 1 | 0 | 2 | 0 |
| 44 | (Japan) | MF | Mu Kanazaki | 1 | 0 | 0 | 0 | 0 | 0 | 1 | 0 |
Players away on loan:
Players who left Nagoya Grampus during the season:
| | | | TOTALS | 33 | 4 | 0 | 0 | 8 | 0 | 41 | 4 |
