= Haruya =

- Gender: Male

Origin
- Origin: Japanese
- Meaning: Different meanings depending on the kanji used

Haruya (written: 遥也 or 陽也) is a masculine Japanese given name. Notable people with the name include:

- Haruya Fujii (藤井 陽也; born 2000), Japanese footballer
- Haruya Ide (井出 遥也; born 1994), Japanese footballer
