= Jhonattan Matsuoka =

Paraguayan footballer (born 2000)

Jhonattan Matsuoka 松岡 ジョナタン
Personal information
- Full name: Jhonattan Yoshiyuki Melgarejo Matsuoka
- Date of birth: 27 May 2000 (age 26)
- Place of birth: Paraguay
- Height: 1.77 m (5 ft 10 in)
- Position: Forward

Team information
- Current team: Nankatsu SC
- Number: 77

Youth career
- 2016–2018: Nagoya Grampus

Senior career*
Years	Team	Apps	(Gls)
2019–2021	Nagoya Grampus	0	(0)
2019	→ SC Sagamihara (loan)	0	(0)
2020	→ ReinMeer Aomori (loan)	3	(0)
2021	→ Kamatamare Sanuki (loan)	0	(0)
2021	→ Fukuyama City (loan)	5	(4)
2022	Fukuyama City	0	(0)
2023–2024	Aries Tokyo	31	(14)
2025–	Nankatsu SC	0	(0)

International career^{‡}
2016–2018	Paraguay U18	2	(0)
- * Club domestic league appearances and goals as of 31 January 2025, 11:22 (UTC) ‡ National team caps and goals as of 11 December 2018, 1:22 (UTC)

Jhonattan Yoshiyuki Melgarejo Matsuoka (松岡 ジョナタン, Matsuoka Jonatan; born 27 May 2000) is a Paraguayan footballer who plays as a forward for Nankatsu SC.

== Early life ==
Matsuoka was born in Paraguay. His father is of Paraguayan Italian descent and her mother is of Paraguayan Japanese descent.

Matsuoka moved to Japan with his family at the age of seven.

== Education ==
Matsuoka attended Toori High School.

== Club career ==
Some reports say he has dual nationality, both Paraguayan and Japanese, but as of 2019 he is registered as a foreign player with only Paraguayan nationality in the J.League. After graduating from junior high school, Matsuoka joined Nagoya Grampus U-18.

On 16 December 2018, Matsuoka was announce official transfer to J3 club, SC Sagamihara from 2019 season on loan.

On 9 January 2020, Matsuoka joined to JFL club, ReinMeer Aomori for 2020 season on loan.

On 7 January 2021, Matsuoka was loan again to J3 club, Kamatamare Sanuki for 2021 season.

On 3 September 2021, Matsuoka was announced that would end his development-type loan contract with Kamatamare Sanuki and join to Fukuyama City FC on a transfer loan. While at Sanuki, he did not play in the J3 League and only played in one Emperor's Cup match.

On 15 December 2021, Matsuoka was announce official completely permanent transfer to Fukuyama City FC from 2022 season after loan a half.

On 7 January 2023, Matsuoka joined to Kantō Division 2 club part of JRL, Aries Tokyo for upcoming 2023 season.

On 25 December 2024, Matsuoka was announce official transfer to Kantō Division 1 club part of JRL, Nankatsu SC from 2025 season.

== International career ==
Matsuoka represented Paraguay internationally at youth level, helping the under-18 team win the SBS Cup.

== Personal life ==
Matsuoka is the son of a Paraguayan footballer.

== Career statistics ==
=== Club ===
As of the start for 2025 season

Appearances and goals by club, season and competition
Club	Season	League			National cup		League cup		Other		Total	
Club	Season	Division	Apps	Goals	Apps	Goals	Apps	Goals	Apps	Goals	Apps	Goals
Nagoya Grampus	2019	J1 League	0	0	0	0	0	0	—		0	0
Nagoya Grampus	2020	J1 League	0	0	0	0	0	0	—		0	0
Nagoya Grampus	2021	J1 League	0	0	0	0	0	0	—		0	0
Nagoya Grampus	Total		0	0	0	0	0	0	0	0	0	0
SC Sagamihara (loan)	2019	J3 League	0	0	—		0	0	—		0	0
ReinMeer Aomori	2020	Japan Football League	3	0	1	0	0	0	—		4	0
Kamatamare Sanuki (loan)	2021	J3 League	0	0	1	0	0	0	—		1	0
Fukuyama City FC (loan)	2021	Hiroshima Prefectural League	5	4	0	0	0	0	—		5	4
Fukuyama City FC	2022	Chugoku Soccer League	0	0	1	0	—		4	1	5	1
Aries Tokyo	2023	Kantō Soccer League Div 2	16	12	—		0	0	—		16	12
Aries Tokyo	2024	Kantō Soccer League Div 1	15	2	—		—		2	1	17	3
Nankatsu SC	2025	Kantō Soccer League Div 1	0	0	0	0	—		—		0	0
Nankatsu SC	Total		0	0	0	0	0	0	0	0	0	0
Career total			39	18	3	0	0	0	6	2	48	20

== Honours ==
Individual

- Kantō Soccer League Div 2 top scorer: 2023
