= Mitchell Langerak =

Australian footballer (born 1988)

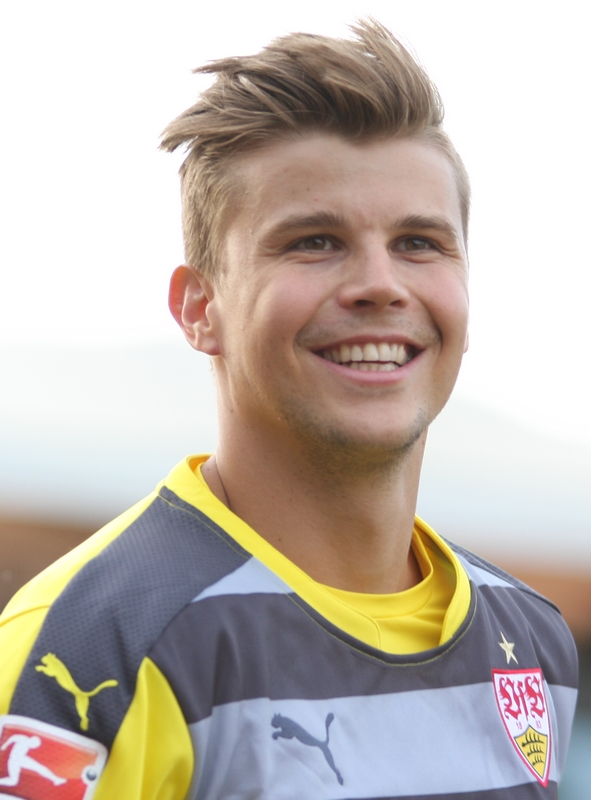
- Langerak with VfB Stuttgart in 2015

Personal information
- Full name: Mitchell James Langerak
- Date of birth: 22 August 1988 (age 38)
- Place of birth: Emerald, Queensland, Australia
- Height: 1.93 m (6 ft 4 in)
- Position: Goalkeeper

Youth career
- 1996–2002: Tieri Tigers
- 2003–2005: Bundaberg Waves
- 2006–2007: AIS

Senior career*
| Years | Team | Apps | (Gls) |
| 2007–2010 | Melbourne Victory | 21 | (0) |
| 2007 | → South Melbourne (loan) | 14 | (0) |
| 2010–2012 | Borussia Dortmund II | 10 | (0) |
| 2010–2015 | Borussia Dortmund | 19 | (0) |
| 2015–2017 | VfB Stuttgart | 36 | (0) |
| 2016–2017 | VfB Stuttgart II | 1 | (0) |
| 2017–2018 | Levante | 0 | (0) |
| 2018–2024 | Nagoya Grampus | 241 | (0) |
| 2025 | Melbourne Victory | 11 | (0) |
| Total | | 353 | (0) |

International career^{‡}
| 2006 | Australia U-20 | 5 | (0) |
| 2013–2022 | Australia | 8 | (0) |
Medal record
Representing Australia
Men's Association football
AFC Asian Cup
| Winner | 2015 Australia |
- * Club domestic league appearances and goals as of 14 June 2025 ‡ National team caps and goals as of 25 September 2023

Mitchell James Langerak (/ˈlæŋəræk/ LANG-ə-rak; born 22 August 1988) is an Australian former professional soccer player who played as a goalkeeper.

== Club career ==
=== Melbourne Victory ===
Langerak signed his first professional contract in February 2007, with A-League club Melbourne Victory. Soon after he was sent on loan to South Melbourne for the remainder of the 2007 Victorian Premier League season, to gain game time and experience.

Once the loan finished Langerak continued his duties as the Victory's third choice goalkeeper before Eugene Galekovic moved to Adelaide United. He made his debut for Melbourne in the Round 21 clash of the 2007–08 season against rivals Sydney FC and despite letting in two goals, his performance in the 2–2 draw was a confident debut.

With Galekovic making a move to Adelaide United, Langerak became the second choice keeper. With first choice Michael Theoklitos making his move overseas, Victory signed New Zealand international Glen Moss from Wellington Phoenix. Moss started the 2009–10 as Melbourne's first choice keeper before Langerak grasped his opportunity in the first team to become the side's first choice keeper for the remainder of the season.

On 13 April 2010, Melbourne announced that they had rejected a bid for Langerak from German giants Borussia Dortmund, however talks continued. On 4 May 2010, Langerak revealed to FourFourTwo Magazine, that Borussia Dortmund had made a second, substantially increased, bid for his services on the same day as the interview, but was again rejected by Melbourne Victory.

=== South Melbourne ===
In 2007, Langerak joined South Melbourne on loan for the 2007 VPL Season. Langerak arrived to the club in turmoil with their first-choice keeper injured and languishing near the bottom of the table at risk of relegation.

Langerak's solid performances helped South achieve a mid-table finish and allow him to gain valuable experience.

=== Borussia Dortmund ===
On 12 May 2010, Melbourne Victory accepted a third offer for Langerak from Borussia Dortmund, a four-year deal. After joining Dortmund, Langerak became the club's second choice goalkeeper during the 2010–11 Bundesliga season and was a regular in matchday squads. Langerak said his goal for the season was to learn as much as possible.

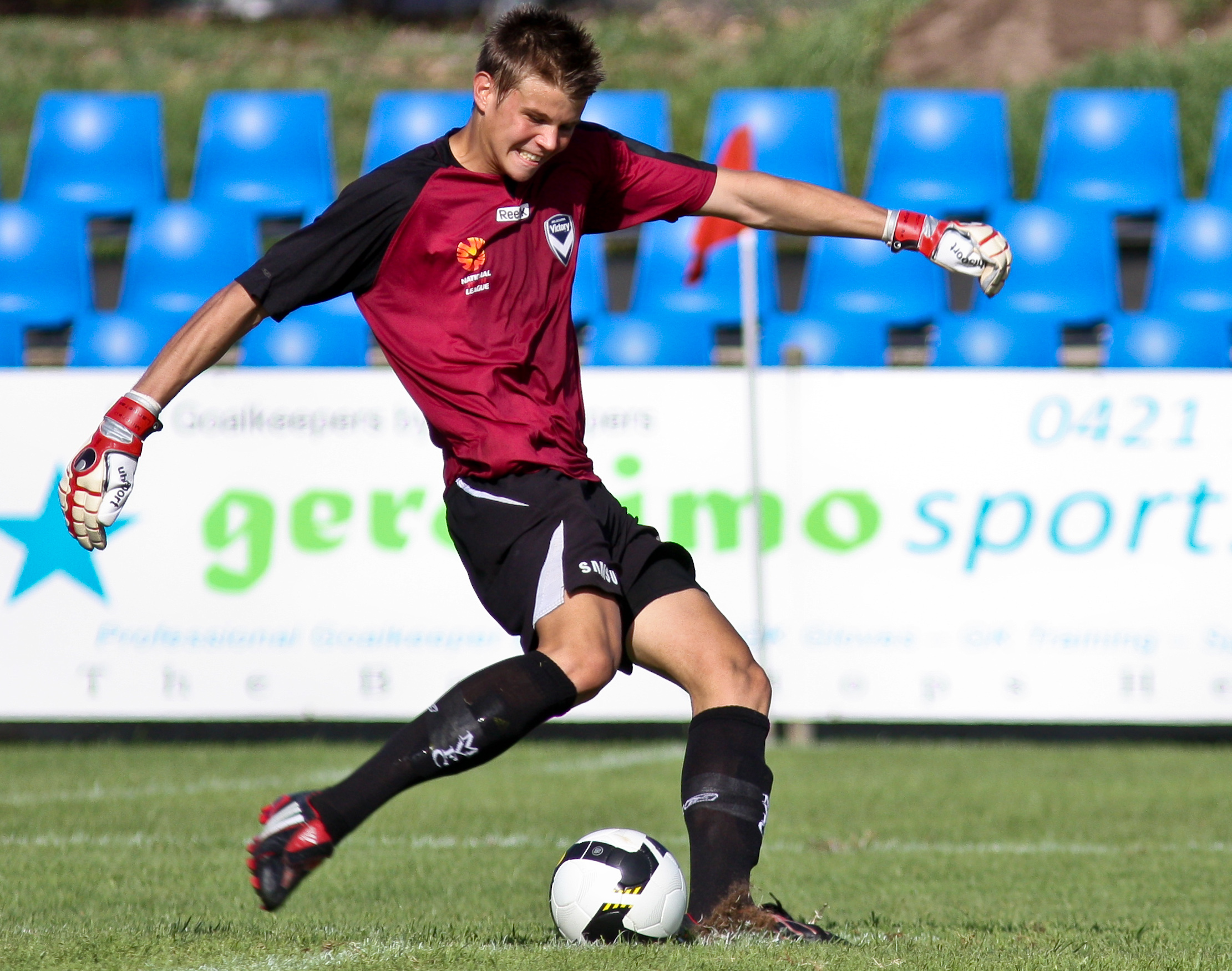
Langerak playing for the Melbourne Victory youth team in 2009.

With Roman Weidenfeller injured, Langerak started his first game for Dortmund in their 3–1 win against reigning German champions Bayern Munich, where he showed a solid performance. Langerak made a return to the first team squad for the first time picked before an available Weidenfeller in Dortmund's second round DFB-Pokal game with Dynamo Dresden. During the game many flares were lit in Signal Iduna Park bringing some concern; no action was taken and Langerak showed signs of jubilation with manager Jürgen Klopp after the game as he recorded his first clean sheet in front of over 80,000 in attendance.

On 12 May 2012, two years to the day after sealing his move to Borussia Dortmund, Langerak came on as a 34th-minute substitute in the DFB-Pokal final against Bayern Munich. He came on for the injured Roman Weidenfeller who had suspected rib damage after a challenge with Mario Gómez earlier in the game. Dortmund went on to win the game 5–2 to claim the cup and Langerak's third title in two seasons at the club.

On 27 July 2013, Langerak won the 2013 DFL-Supercup with Dortmund 4–2 against rivals Bayern Munich.

Langerak played the BVB opener of the 2013–2014 Bundesliga against Augsburg where he kept a clean sheet in a 4–0 win. This meant that in the seven league and Bundesliga games in which Langerak played Borussia Dortmund had won.

On 18 September 2013, Langerak made his Champions League debut against Napoli after Weidenfeller was sent off. He broke two front teeth in collision with a goalpost in an unsuccessful attempt to stop Lorenzo Insigne scoring.

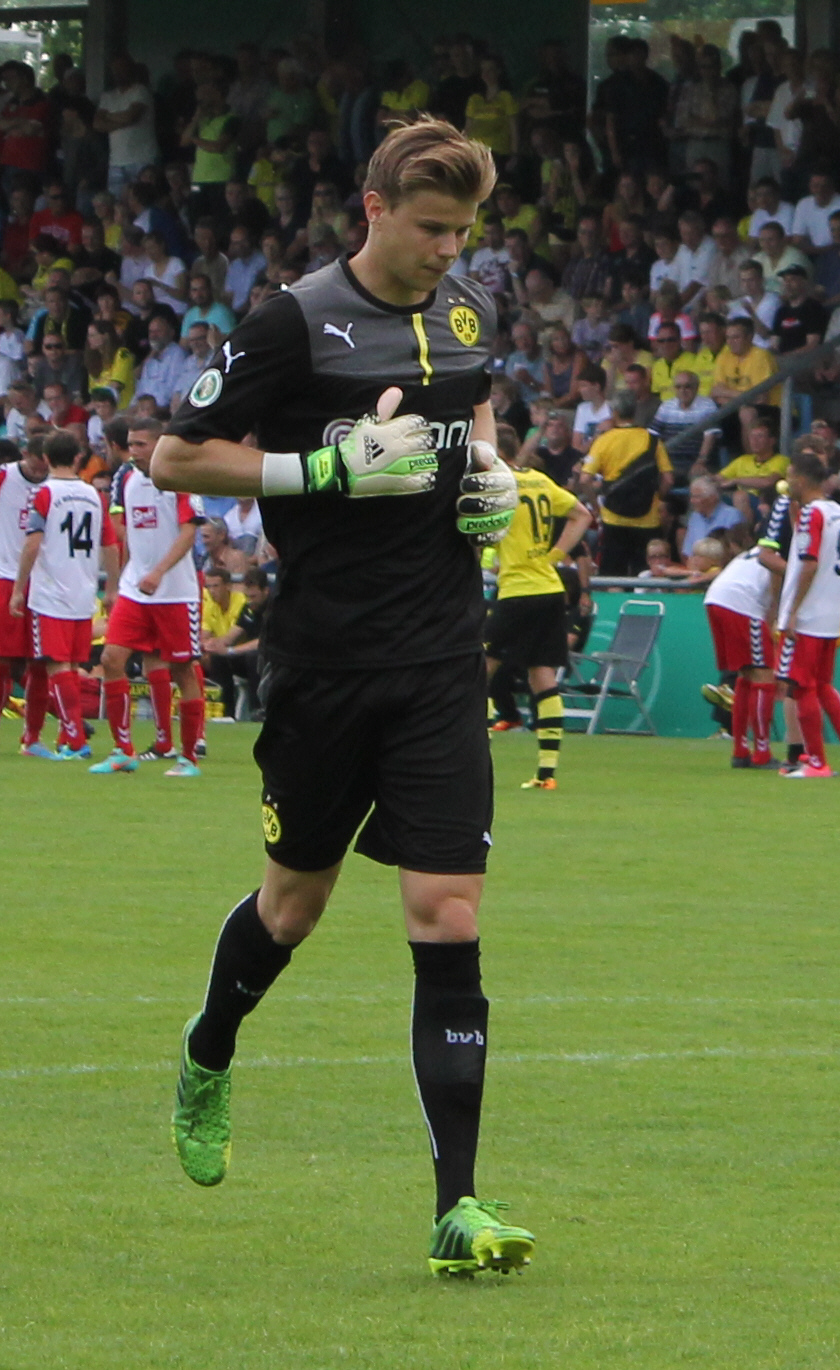
Langerak with Borussia Dortmund in 2013

On 23 August 2014, Langerak conceded the fastest goal (9 seconds), in the history of Bundesliga, on the opening game of the season 2014–15, a home match against Bayer Leverkusen, which ended in a 2–0 loss for Dortmund.

=== VfB Stuttgart ===
For the 2015–16 season, Langerak moved to VfB Stuttgart. He made his Bundesliga debut for VfB Stuttgart on 7 May 2016 at home to Mainz 05. The season ended with Stuttgart's relegation to the 2. Bundesliga. After the departure of Przemysław Tytoń, Langerak was handed the starting position and instantly became a fan favourite.

=== Levante ===
On 30 August 2017, Langerak joined Levante on a two-year deal.

=== Nagoya Grampus ===
On 14 January 2018, Langerak signed for Nagoya Grampus. On 12 December 2020, he made his 100th appearance in the J.League in a 0–0 away draw against Yokohama. On 19 December 2020, he set new J.League record, keeping 17 clean sheets in the 2020 J.League campaign in 1–0 win against Sanfrecce Hiroshima. On 12 September 2021, Langerak broke his own clean sheets record in J.League, keeping 18 clean sheets in a 3–0 victory over Tokushima Vortis. He also set the new all-time record at 823 consecutive minutes without conceding a goal in the 2021 J.League campaign.

On 23 September 2023, Langerak made his 200th appearance in the J.League in a 1–1 draw against Hokkaido Consadole Sapporo. On 2 November 2024, he scored Grampus's second penalty of the shoot-out in the 2024 J.League Cup final victory over Albirex Niigata.

=== Melbourne Victory ===
On 3 August 2024, Melbourne Victory announced the signing of Langerak on an 18-month contract, with the transfer to take place during the January 2025 transfer window. On 10 July 2025 Melbourne Victory announced the retirement of Langerak. He would take up a role coaching in the Victory Academy Program.

== International career ==
Langerak was selected in the Young Socceroos squad to play in the 2006 AFC Youth Championship. Langerak received his first senior national team call-up in March 2011, named by coach Holger Osieck as a member of the 17-man squad to play Germany in a friendly match.

Langerak made his debut for Australia's senior team in an international friendly against France on 12 October 2013, a match in which the Socceroos were thrashed 6–0. This match turned out to be manager Holger Osieck's final match in charge of Australia, with his sacking coming shortly after the conclusion of the match. Langerak made his second appearance for Australia against Canada, a match which Australia won 3–0. Langerak was included in the 23-man squad going to Brazil for the 2014 FIFA World Cup. He was also included in Australia's final list for 2015 AFC Asian Cup, which was held in Australia, but he didn't play a single match.

In May 2021, having represented Australia eight times, Langerak announced his retirement from international football due to wanting to remain with his family during the COVID-19 pandemic. In September 2022, Langerak came out of international retirement ahead of the 2022 FIFA World Cup, following relaxation of restrictions on international travel, but was not selected for the World Cup squad.

== Career statistics ==
=== Club ===
Appearances and goals by club, season and competition
| Club | Season | League | | | National cup | | League cup | | Continental | | Other | | Total | |
| Club | Season | Division | Apps | Goals | Apps | Goals | Apps | Goals | Apps | Goals | Apps | Goals | Apps | Goals |
|---|---|---|---|---|---|---|---|---|---|---|---|---|---|---|
| South Melbourne (loan) | 2007 | Victorian Premier League | 14 | 0 | — | | — | | — | | — | | 14 | 0 |
| Melbourne Victory | 2007–08 | A-League | 1 | 0 | 3 | 0 | — | | 1 | 0 | — | | 5 | 0 |
| Melbourne Victory | 2008–09 | A-League | 4 | 0 | 1 | 0 | — | | — | | — | | 5 | 0 |
| Melbourne Victory | 2009–10 | A-League | 16 | 0 | — | | — | | 5 | 0 | — | | 21 | 0 |
| Melbourne Victory | Total | | 21 | 0 | 4 | 0 | — | | 6 | 0 | — | | 31 | 0 |
| Borussia Dortmund | 2010–11 | Bundesliga | 1 | 0 | 0 | 0 | — | | 0 | 0 | — | | 1 | 0 |
| Borussia Dortmund | 2011–12 | Bundesliga | 2 | 0 | 3 | 0 | — | | 0 | 0 | 0 | 0 | 5 | 0 |
| Borussia Dortmund | 2012–13 | Bundesliga | 3 | 0 | 0 | 0 | — | | 0 | 0 | 0 | 0 | 3 | 0 |
| Borussia Dortmund | 2013–14 | Bundesliga | 4 | 0 | 3 | 0 | — | | 2 | 0 | 0 | 0 | 9 | 0 |
| Borussia Dortmund | 2014–15 | Bundesliga | 9 | 0 | 6 | 0 | — | | 1 | 0 | 1 | 0 | 17 | 0 |
| Borussia Dortmund | Total | | 19 | 0 | 12 | 0 | — | | 3 | 0 | 1 | 0 | 35 | 0 |
| VfB Stuttgart | 2015–16 | Bundesliga | 2 | 0 | 1 | 0 | — | | — | | — | | 3 | 0 |
| VfB Stuttgart | 2016–17 | 2. Bundesliga | 34 | 0 | 2 | 0 | — | | — | | — | | 36 | 0 |
| VfB Stuttgart | 2017–18 | Bundesliga | 0 | 0 | 0 | 0 | — | | — | | — | | 0 | 0 |
| VfB Stuttgart | Total | | 36 | 0 | 3 | 0 | — | | 0 | 0 | — | | 39 | 0 |
| Levante | 2017–18 | La Liga | 0 | 0 | 0 | 0 | — | | — | | — | | 0 | 0 |
| Nagoya Grampus | 2018 | J1 League | 34 | 0 | 1 | 0 | 0 | 0 | — | | — | | 35 | 0 |
| Nagoya Grampus | 2019 | J1 League | 33 | 0 | 0 | 0 | 2 | 0 | — | | — | | 35 | 0 |
| Nagoya Grampus | 2020 | J1 League | 34 | 0 | — | | 4 | 0 | — | | — | | 38 | 0 |
| Nagoya Grampus | 2021 | J1 League | 38 | 0 | 4 | 0 | 5 | 0 | 7 | 0 | — | | 54 | 0 |
| Nagoya Grampus | 2022 | J1 League | 33 | 0 | 1 | 0 | 7 | 0 | — | | — | | 41 | 0 |
| Nagoya Grampus | 2023 | J1 League | 34 | 0 | 3 | 0 | 6 | 0 | — | | — | | 43 | 0 |
| Nagoya Grampus | 2024 | J1 League | 35 | 0 | 0 | 0 | 6 | 0 | — | | — | | 41 | 0 |
| Nagoya Grampus | Total | | 241 | 0 | 9 | 0 | 30 | 0 | 7 | 0 | — | | 287 | 0 |
| Melbourne Victory | 2024–25 | A-League Men | 11 | 0 | — | | — | | — | | — | | 11 | 0 |
| Career total | | | 342 | 0 | 28 | 0 | 30 | 0 | 16 | 0 | 1 | 0 | 417 | 0 |

=== International ===
Appearances and goals by national team and year
| National team | Year | Apps | Goals |
|---|---|---|---|
| Australia | 2011 | 0 | 0 |
| Australia | 2012 | 0 | 0 |
| Australia | 2013 | 2 | 0 |
| Australia | 2014 | 3 | 0 |
| Australia | 2015 | 1 | 0 |
| Australia | 2016 | 0 | 0 |
| Australia | 2017 | 2 | 0 |
| Australia | 2018 | 0 | 0 |
| Australia | 2019 | 0 | 0 |
| Australia | 2022 | 0 | 0 |
| Total | | 8 | 0 |

== Honours ==
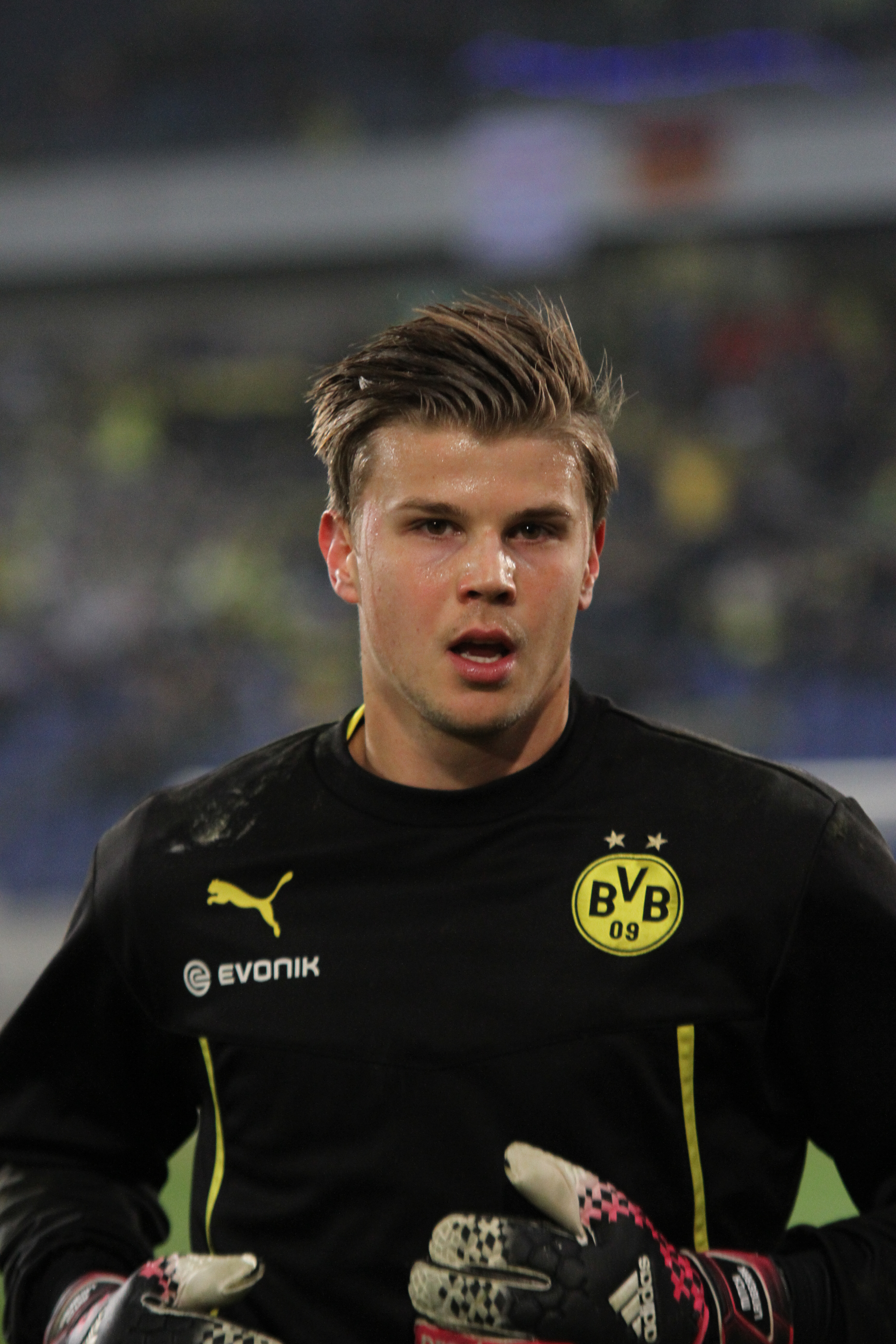
Langerak with Borussia Dortmund in 2014

Melbourne Victory

- A-League Pre-Season Challenge Cup: 2008
- A-League Championship: 2008–09
- A-League Premiership: 2008–09

Borussia Dortmund

- Bundesliga: 2010–11, 2011–12
- DFB-Pokal: 2011–12
- DFL-Supercup: 2013, 2014
- UEFA Champions League runner-up: 2012–13

VfB Stuttgart

- 2. Bundesliga: 2016–17

Nagoya Grampus

- J.League Cup: 2021. 2024

Australia

- AFC Asian Cup: 2015

Australia U-20

- AFF U-19 Youth Championship: 2006

Individual

- PFA Harry Kewell Medal: 2009–10
- J.League MVP of the month: December 2020, September 2021
- J.League Best XI: 2021
- Nagoya Grampus Player of the Season: 2022
- J.League Cup MVP: 2024

Records

- J.League 1 most clean sheets in a season: 21 (2021)
- Longest consecutive run without conceding a goal in J.League 1: 823 minutes
