= Yasuki Kimoto =

Japanese footballer

Yasuki Kimoto 木本恭生
Personal information
- Full name: Yasuki Kimoto
- Date of birth: 6 August 1993 (age 33)
- Place of birth: Fuji, Shizuoka, Japan
- Height: 1.83 m (6 ft 0 in)
- Positions: Centre back; defensive midfielder

Team information
- Current team: Mito HollyHock
- Number: 15

Youth career
- 2006–2008: Shizuoka Gakuen Junior High School
- 2009–2011: Shizuoka Gakuen High School

College career
Years	Team	Apps	(Gls)
2012–2015	Fukuoka University		

Senior career*
Years	Team	Apps	(Gls)
2016–2021	Cerezo Osaka	103	(3)
2016	→ Cerezo Osaka U-23 (loan)	23	(1)
2021	Nagoya Grampus	32	(0)
2022–2026	FC Tokyo	82	(3)
2025	→ Sagan Tosu (loan)	6	(0)
2026–	Mito HollyHock	1	(0)
Medal record
Cerezo Osaka
Winner	J.League Cup	2017
Winner	Emperor's Cup	2017
- * Club domestic league appearances and goals as of 12 August 2026

Yasuki Kimoto (木本恭生, Kimoto, Yasuki; born 6 August 1993 in Fuji, Shizuoka) is a Japanese professional footballer who plays as a centre back or a defensive midfielder for J1 League club Mito HollyHock.

== Career ==
Kimoto joined Cerezo Osaka from Fukuoka University in 2016 and was initially assigned to Cerezo Osaka U-23. He scored his first professional league goal on his first team debut for Cerezo Osaka, scoring the winning goal in the 90th+4th minute. On 18 March 2017, Kimoto made his J1 League debut against Sagan Tosu and assisted Kazuya Yamamura's winning goal. On 8 October 2017, in the second leg of the semi-finals of the J.League Cup, Kimoto scored in the 90th+5th minute to send Cerezo Osaka to the first ever final. A few weeks after the match, he was quoted as saying: "I want to win and keep playing in the games". Cerezo would go on to win the J League Cup.

On 24 December 2020, Kimoto was announced at Nagoya Grampus on a permanent transfer. On 15 May 2021, his Nagoya teammate and captain Yuichi Maruyama was injured against Shimizu S-Pulse, and Kimoto was substituted on as his replacement.

On 19 December 2021, Kimoto was announced at FC Tokyo on a permanent transfer. He joined the team that his role model, Masato Morishige, plays for. Kimoto said: "I don't think it's an easy wall to overcome. It will be difficult, but I need to use my footwork, which is my forte, to perform better than Morishige.".

== Style of play ==
Kimoto can play as a center back or defensive midfielder, and is noted for his passing skills.

== Club statistics ==
As of 24 July 2022.

Appearances and goals by club, season and competition
Club	Season	League			Cup		League Cup		Continental		Total	
Club	Season	Division	Apps	Goals	Apps	Goals	Apps	Goals	Apps	Goals	Apps	Goals
Japan			League		Emperor's Cup		J.League Cup		AFC		Total	
Cerezo Osaka	2016	J2 League	1	1	1	0	–		–		2	1
Cerezo Osaka	2017	J1 League	23	2	4	1	13	3	–		40	6
Cerezo Osaka	2018	J1 League	22	0	2	0	2	0	2	0	28	0
Cerezo Osaka	2019	J1 League	29	0	2	0	4	0	–		35	0
Cerezo Osaka	2020	J1 League	28	0	0	0	3	0	–		31	0
Cerezo Osaka	Total		103	3	9	1	22	3	2	0	136	7
Cerezo Osaka U-23 (loan)	2016	J3 League	23	1	–		–		–		23	1
Nagoya Grampus	2021	J1 League	32	0	4	0	5	1	7	0	48	1
FC Tokyo	2022	J1 League	21	1	2	0	1	0	–		24	1
Career total			179	5	15	1	28	4	9	0	231	10

== Honours ==
Nagoya Grampus

- J.League Cup: 2021
