= Mu Kanazaki =

Japanese footballer (born 1989)

Mū Kanazaki 金崎 夢生
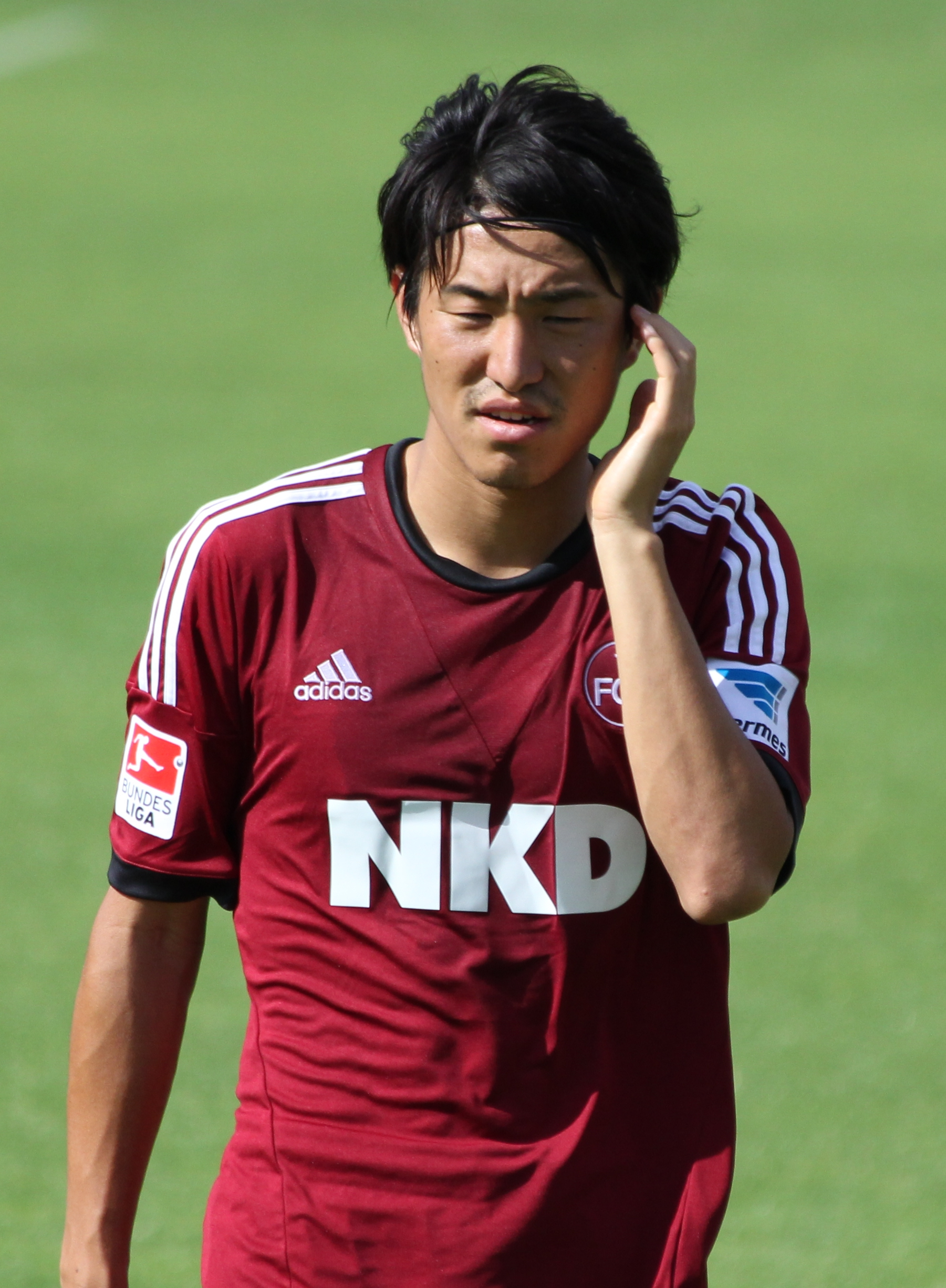
- Kanazaki playing for 1.FC Nürnberg in 2013

Personal information
- Full name: Mū Kanazaki
- Date of birth: 16 February 1989 (age 37)
- Place of birth: Tsu, Mie, Japan
- Height: 1.80 m (5 ft 11 in)
- Positions: Attacking midfielder; winger

Team information
- Current team: Verspah Oita
- Number: 87

Youth career
- 1997–2000: Centro Tsunan
- 2001–2003: Tokan Junior High School
- 2004–2006: Takigawa Daini High School

Senior career*
Years	Team	Apps	(Gls)
2007–2009	Oita Trinita	74	(8)
2010–2012	Nagoya Grampus	69	(9)
2013	1. FC Nurnberg	4	(0)
2013–2016	Portimonense	48	(16)
2015	→ Kashima Antlers (loan)	27	(9)
2016–2018	Kashima Antlers	78	(32)
2018–2021	Sagan Tosu	46	(10)
2020–2021	→ Nagoya Grampus (loan)	25	(6)
2021–2022	Nagoya Grampus	13	(1)
2022	Oita Trinita	13	(1)
2023	FC Ryukyu	22	(1)
2024–	Verspah Oita	13	(2)

International career^{‡}
2007	Japan U20	4	(0)
2009–2017	Japan	11	(2)
Medal record
Oita Trinita
Winner	J.League Cup	2008
Nagoya Grampus
Winner	J1 League	2010
Runner-up	J1 League	2011
Kashima Antlers
Winner	AFC Champions League	2018
Winner	J1 League	2016
Runner-up	J1 League	2017
Winner	J.League Cup	2015
Winner	Emperor's Cup	2016
- * Club domestic league appearances and goals as of 15 March 2025 ‡ National team caps and goals as of 15 March 2018, 18:22 (UTC)

Mu Kanazaki (金崎 夢生, Kanazaki Mū; born 16 February 1989) is a Japanese professional footballer who plays for Japan Football League club Verspah Oita. He scored the two goals that won the 2016 J1 League final for Kashima Antlers over Urawa Red Diamonds.

== Club career ==
On 25 March 2020, Kanazaki returned to Nagoya Grampus on loan from Sagan Tosu until 31 January 2021. On 15 January 2021, following his season on loan at Nagoya Grampus, Kanazaki signed permanently for the club.

On 24 February 2023, Kanazaki officially announced his transfer to FC Ryukyu after their relegation from the J2 League ahead of the 2023 J3 League season.

== International career ==
Kanazaki made his full international debut for Japan on 20 January 2009 in a 2011 AFC Asian Cup qualification against Yemen.

== Career statistics ==
=== Club ===
As of 24 February 2023.

Appearances and goals by club, season and competition
Club	Season	League			National Cup (Note: Appearances in Emperor's Cup)		League Cup (Note: Appearances in J. League Cup)		Continental (Note: Appearances in AFC Champions League)		Other (Note: Appearances in Pan-Pacific Championship, Suruga Bank Championship, Japanese Super Cup and FIFA Club World Cup)		Total	
Club	Season	Division	Apps	Goals	Apps	Goals	Apps	Goals	Apps	Goals	Apps	Goals	Apps	Goals
Oita Trinita	2007	J1 League	10	2	0	0	4	1	–		–		14	3
Oita Trinita	2008	J1 League	34	4	0	0	9	0	–		–		43	4
Oita Trinita	2009	J1 League	30	1	2	3	3	1	–		3	0	38	5
Oita Trinita	Total		74	7	2	3	16	2	0	0	3	0	95	12
Nagoya Grampus	2010	J1 League	25	4	2	0	3	0	–		–		30	4
Nagoya Grampus	2011	J1 League	12	0	4	0	2	1	4	3	1	0	23	4
Nagoya Grampus	2012	J1 League	32	5	4	1	1	0	7	1	–		44	7
Nagoya Grampus	Total		69	9	10	1	6	1	11	4	1	0	97	15
1. FC Nürnberg II	2012–13	Regionalliga Bayern	3	0	–								3	0
1. FC Nürnberg	2012–13	Bundesliga	4	0	–								4	0
1. FC Nürnberg	Total		7	0	–								7	0
Portimonense	2013–14	Segunda Liga	30	7	2	0	1	0	–		–		33	7
Portimonense	2014–15	Segunda Liga	17	9	0	0	3	1	–		–		21	10
Portimonense	2015–16	Segunda Liga	2	0	2	0	–		–		–		4	0
Portimonense	Total		49	16	4	0	4	1	0	0	0	0	57	17
Kashima Antlers (loan)	2015	J1 League	27	9	0	0	5	5	4	1	0	0	36	15
Kashima Antlers	2016	J1 League	33	13	1	0	0	0	0	0	4	2	38	15
Kashima Antlers	2017	J1 League	30	12	1	2	3	0	5	4	1	0	39	18
Kashima Antlers	2018	J1 League	15	7	1	0	0	0	6	3	0	0	22	10
Kashima Antlers	Total		78	41	3	2	3	0	11	7	5	2	100	43
Sagan Tosu	2018	J1 League	15	3	0	0	0	0	–		–		15	3
Sagan Tosu	2019	J1 League	31	7	2	1	4	0	–		–		37	8
Sagan Tosu	2020	J1 League	0	0	0	0	0	0	–		–		0	0
Sagan Tosu	Total		46	10	2	1	4	0	0	0	0	0	52	11
Nagoya Grampus (loan)	2020	J1 League	25	6	0	0	1	0	–		–		26	6
Nagoya Grampus	2021	J1 League	6	1	1	0	3	0	0	0	–		10	1
Nagoya Grampus	2022	J1 League	7	0	1	0	5	0	0	0	–		13	0
Nagoya Grampus	Total		38	7	2	0	9	0	0	0	0	0	49	7
Oita Trinita	2022	J2 League	12	1	–								12	0
Oita Trinita	Total		12	1	–								12	1
FC Ryukyu	2023	J3 League	0	0	0	0	0	0	0	0	–		0	0
FC Ryukyu	Total		0	0	0	0	0	0	0	0	0	0	0	0
Career total			405	91	25	7	47	10	26	13	8	2	511	123

=== International ===
Appearances and goals by national team and year
National team	Year	Apps	Goals
Japan	2009	1	0
Japan	2010	4	0
Japan	2011	0	0
Japan	2012	0	0
Japan	2013	0	0
Japan	2014	0	0
Japan	2015	1	1
Japan	2016	4	1
Japan	2017	1	0
Total		11	2

Scores and results list Japan's goal tally first, score column indicates score after each Kanazaki goal.

List of international goals scored by Mu Kanazaki
No.	Date	Venue	Opponent	Score	Result	Competition
1	12 November 2015	National Stadium, Kallang, Singapore	Singapore	1–0	3–0	2018 FIFA World Cup qualification
2	24 March 2016	Saitama Stadium 2002, Saitama, Japan	Afghanistan	5–0	5–0	2018 FIFA World Cup qualification

== Honours ==
Oita Trinita

- J.League Cup: 2008

Nagoya Grampus

- J1 League: 2010
- Japanese Super Cup: 2011
- J.League Cup: 2021

Kashima Antlers

- J.League Cup: 2015
- J1 League: 2016
- Emperor's Cup: 2016
- Japanese Super Cup: 2017

Individual

- J. League Cup New Hero Award: 2008
