= Adaílton =

Adaílton is a Brazilian common given name.

It can refer to the following Brazilian footballers:

- Adaílton (footballer, born 1977), full name Adaílton Martins Bolzan, forward and coach
- Adaílton (footballer, born 1979), full name Adaílton da Silva Santos, defender
- Adaílton (footballer, born 1983), full name Adaílton José dos Santos Filho, defender
- Adaílton (footballer, born 1990), full name Adaílton dos Santos da Silva, forward
