= Adaílton (footballer, born 1979) =

Brazilian footballer

Adaílton da Silva Santos (born 26 December 1979 in Salvador Bahia), best known as Adaílton, is a Brazilian footballer.

His career started in 2000 when he played for Barreiras. He then played for Criciúma Esporte Clube and in France with AS Nancy-Lorraine, winner of the Coupe de la Ligue in 2006.

Adailton retired from professional football because of a serious leg injury according to Ligue 1 club Nancy on 18 October 2008.
