= Haruya Fujii =

Japanese footballer (born 2000)

Haruya Fujii 藤井 陽也
Personal information
- Full name: Haruya Fujii
- Date of birth: 26 December 2000 (age 25)
- Place of birth: Aichi, Japan
- Height: 1.87 m (6 ft 2 in)
- Position: Centre-back

Team information
- Current team: Nagoya Grampus
- Number: 13

Youth career
- Hikari FC
- –2018: Nagoya Grampus

Senior career*
Years	Team	Apps	(Gls)
2018–2024	Nagoya Grampus	75	(3)
2024	→ Kortrijk (loan)	12	(0)
2024–2025	Kortrijk	22	(0)
2025–	Nagoya Grampus	31	(0)

International career^{‡}
2024–	Japan	1	(0)
- * Club domestic league appearances and goals as of 12 August 2026 ‡ National team caps and goals as of 11:07, 1 January 2024 (UTC)

Haruya Fujii (藤井 陽也, Fujii Haruya; born 26 December 2000) is a Japanese professional footballer who plays as a centre-back for J1 League club Nagoya Grampus.

== Club career ==
Fujii was born in Aichi Prefecture. He joined J1 League club Nagoya Grampus from their youth team in 2018. On 10 January 2024, Fujii joined Belgian Pro League side Kortrijk on loan until the end of the season with an option to buy.

After spending a year-and-a-half in Belgium, Fujii returned to Nagoya Grampus on 14 August 2025.

== International career ==
Fujii made his debut for the senior Japan national team on 1 January 2024 in a friendly against Thailand.

== Career statistics ==
=== Club ===
As of match played 26 May 2025

Appearances and goals by club, season and competition
Club	Season	League			National cup (Note: Includes Emperor's Cup, Belgian Cup)		League cup (Note: Includes J. League Cup)		Continental		Total	
Club	Season	Division	Apps	Goals	Apps	Goals	Apps	Goals	Apps	Goals	Apps	Goals
Nagoya Grampus	2018	J1 League	0	0	0	0	3	0	—		3	0
Nagoya Grampus	2019	J1 League	4	0	0	0	1	0	—		5	0
Nagoya Grampus	2020	J1 League	1	0	—		1	0	—		2	0
Nagoya Grampus	2021	J1 League	5	0	3	1	0	0	3 (Note: Appearances in AFC Champions League)	0	11	1
Nagoya Grampus	2022	J1 League	31	1	3	0	9	0	—		43	1
Nagoya Grampus	2023	J1 League	34	2	4	1	8	0	—		46	3
Nagoya Grampus	Total		75	3	10	2	22	0	3	0	110	5
Kortrijk (loan)	2023–24	Belgian Pro League	12	0	—		—		—		12	0
Kortrijk	2024–25	Belgian Pro League	22	0	2	0	—		—		24	0
Kortrijk	Total		34	0	2	0	—		—		36	0
Career total			109	3	12	2	22	0	3	0	146	5

=== International ===
As of match played 1 January 2024

Appearances and goals by national team and year
National team	Year	Apps	Goals
Japan	2024	1	0
Total		1	0

== Honours ==
Individual

- J1 100 Year Vision League Regional Round West Best Eleven: 2026
