= Sho Inagaki =

Japanese footballer (born 1991)

Sho Inagaki 稲垣 祥
Personal information
- Full name: Sho Inagaki
- Date of birth: 25 December 1991 (age 34)
- Place of birth: Nerima, Tokyo, Japan
- Height: 1.75 m (5 ft 9 in)
- Position: Defensive midfielder

Team information
- Current team: Nagoya Grampus
- Number: 15

Youth career
- 1998–2001: Onishi Hurricane FC
- 2002–2003: South Juve FC
- 2004–2006: FC Tokyo Musashi
- 2007–2009: Teikyo High School

College career
Years	Team	Apps	(Gls)
2010–2013	Nippon Sport Science University		

Senior career*
Years	Team	Apps	(Gls)
2014–2016	Ventforet Kofu	81	(6)
2017–2019	Sanfrecce Hiroshima	71	(9)
2020–	Nagoya Grampus	219	(35)

International career^{‡}
2021–	Japan	4	(3)
Medal record
Sanfrecce Hiroshima
Runner-up	J1 League	2018
Japan
Winner	EAFF E-1	2025
- * Club domestic league appearances and goals as of 12 August 2026 ‡ National team caps and goals as of 15 July 2025

Sho Inagaki (稲垣 祥, Inagaki Shō; born 25 December 1991) is a Japanese footballer who plays for Nagoya Grampus and the Japan national team.

== Club career ==
Sho made his league debut for Ventforet against Kashima Antlers on the 1 March 2014. He scored his first league goal for Ventforet against Montedio Yamagata on the 17 October 2015, scoring in the 62nd minute.

Sho made his league debut for Sanfreece against Albirex Niigata on the 25 February 2017. He scored his first league goal for the club against Vissel Kobe on the 18 November 2017.

Sho made his league debut for Nagoya against Vegalta Sendai on the 22 February 2020. He scored his first league goal for Nagoya against Kashima Antlers on the 5 September 2020.

== International career ==
He made his debut for Japan national football team on 30 March 2021 in a World Cup qualifier against Mongolia and scored twice in the 14–0 victory.

On 15 July 2025 he was part of the Japan national team side that won the 2025 EAFF E-1 Football Championship, making two appearances and scoring one goal against the Hong Kong national team.

== International goals ==
No.	Date	Venue	Opponent	Score	Result	Competition
1.	30 March 2021	Fukuda Denshi Arena, Chiba, Japan	Mongolia	7–0	14–0	2022 FIFA World Cup qualification
2.	30 March 2021	Fukuda Denshi Arena, Chiba, Japan	Mongolia	14–0	14–0	2022 FIFA World Cup qualification
3.	8 July 2025	Yongin Mireu Stadium, Yongin, South Korea	Hong Kong	3–0	6–1	2025 EAFF E-1 Football Championship

== Club statistics ==
Updated to 15 July 2025.

Club performance			League		Cup		League Cup		Continental		Total	
Club	Season	League	Apps	Goals	Apps	Goals	Apps	Goals	Apps	Goals	Apps	Goals
Japan			League		Emperor's Cup		League Cup		AFC		Total	
Ventforet Kofu	2014	J1 League	19	0	3	1	5	0	–		27	1
Ventforet Kofu	2015	J1 League	29	1	2	0	5	0	–		36	1
Ventforet Kofu	2016	J1 League	33	5	0	0	6	0	–		39	5
Ventforet Kofu	Total		81	6	5	1	16	0	0	0	102	7
Sanfrecce Hiroshima	2017	J1 League	14	2	3	0	6	0	–		23	2
Sanfrecce Hiroshima	2018	J1 League	33	3	3	0	3	0	–		39	3
Sanfrecce Hiroshima	2019	J1 League	24	4	1	0	2	0	5	0	32	4
Sanfrecce Hiroshima	Total		71	9	7	0	11	0	5	0	94	9
Nagoya Grampus	2020	J1 League	34	3	–		4	0	–		38	3
Nagoya Grampus	2021	J1 League	38	8	4	0	5	4	8	0	55	14
Nagoya Grampus	2022	J1 League	34	2	1	0	10	2	–		45	4
Nagoya Grampus	2023	J1 League	33	3	4	0	8	0	–		45	3
Nagoya Grampus	2024	J1 League	36	6	–		8	0	–		44	6
Nagoya Grampus	2025	J1 League	23	7	1	1	1	0	–		25	8
Nagoya Grampus	Total		198	29	10	1	36	6	8	0	252	38
Career total			350	44	22	2	63	6	13	0	448	54

== Honours ==
Sanfreece Hiroshima

- J1 League: 2018 (runners-up)

Nagoya Grampus

- J.League Cup: 2021, 2024

Japan

- EAFF E-1: 2025

Individual

- J.League Best XI: 2021, 2025
- J.League Cup Most Valuable Player: 2021
