= Ryotaro Ishida =

Japanese footballer

Ryotaro Ishida 石田 凌太郎
Personal information
- Full name: Ryotaro Ishida
- Date of birth: December 13, 2001 (age 24)
- Place of birth: Kanagawa, Japan
- Height: 1.74 m (5 ft 8 1/2 in)
- Positions: Winger; right back

Team information
- Current team: Blaublitz Akita
- Number: 31

Youth career
- Grampus Miyoshi School
- –2019: Nagoya Grampus

Senior career*
Years	Team	Apps	(Gls)
2018–2024	Nagoya Grampus	38	(2)
2022	→ Tokushima Vortis (loan)	0	(0)
2023–2024	→ Tochigi SC (Loan)	41	(1)
2025–	Blaublitz Akita	32	(0)
Total		111	(3)
- * Club domestic league appearances and goals as of 1 January 2026

Ryotaro Ishida (石田 凌太郎, Ishida Ryotaro; born December 13, 2001) is a Japanese footballer who plays as a winger or right back for J2 League club Blaublitz Akita.

== Career ==
Ishida was born in Aichi Prefecture on December 13, 2001. He joined J1 League club Nagoya Grampus from youth team in 2018. On August 22, he debuted against Sanfrecce Hiroshima in Emperor's Cup.

== Club statistics ==
As of 14 March 2024.

Appearances and goals by club, season and competition
Club	Season	League			Cup		League Cup		Other		Total	
Club	Season	Division	Apps	Goals	Apps	Goals	Apps	Goals	Apps	Goals	Apps	Goals
Japan			League		Emperor's Cup		J.League Cup		Other		Total	
Nagoya Grampus	2018	J1 League	0	0	1	0	0	0	–		1	0
Nagoya Grampus	2020	J1 League	7	0	0	0	2	0	–		9	0
Nagoya Grampus	2021	J1 League	0	0	1	1	0	0	2 (Note: Appearances in the AFC Champions League)	0	3	1
Nagoya Grampus	2022	J1 League	8	0	2	0	5	0	–		15	0
Nagoya Grampus	2023	J1 League	4	0	1	0	5	1	–		10	1
Nagoya Grampus	Total		19	0	5	1	12	1	2	0	38	2
Tokushima Vortis (loan)	2022	J2 League	0	0	0	0	–		–		0	0
Tochigi SC (loan)	2023	J2 League	16	0	0	0	–		–		16	0
Tochigi SC (loan)	2024	J2 League	3	0	0	0	0	0	–		3	0
Tochigi SC (loan)	Total		19	0	0	0	0	0	0	0	19	0
Career total			38	0	5	1	12	1	2	0	57	2
