= Ryogo Yamasaki =

Japanese footballer (born 1992)

Ryogo Yamasaki 山﨑 凌吾
Personal information
- Full name: Ryogo Yamasaki
- Date of birth: 20 September 1992 (age 34)
- Place of birth: Okayama, Japan
- Height: 1.87 m (6 ft 2 in)
- Position: Forward

Team information
- Current team: V-Varen Nagasaki
- Number: 18

Youth career
- Kosai SS
- Seto SSS
- –2007: Hero Bizen FC
- 2008–2010: Tamano Konan High School

College career
Years	Team	Apps	(Gls)
2011–2014	Fukuoka University		

Senior career*
Years	Team	Apps	(Gls)
2014–2016	Sagan Tosu	1	(0)
2016	→ Tokushima Vortis (loan)	40	(5)
2017–2018	Tokushima Vortis	52	(17)
2018–2020	Shonan Bellmare	47	(9)
2020–2021	Nagoya Grampus	51	(4)
2022−2024	Kyoto Sanga	49	(3)
2024	Cerezo Osaka	14	(1)
2025–	V-Varen Nagasaki	48	(4)
Medal record
Shonan Bellmare
Winner	J.League Cup	2018
- * Club domestic league appearances and goals as of 11 August 2026

Ryogo Yamasaki (山﨑 凌吾, Yamasaki Ryōgo; born September 20, 1992) is a Japanese footballer who play as a Forward and currently play for J1 League club, V-Varen Nagasaki.

== Career ==
On 28 December 2015, Yamasaki was announced at Tokushima Vortis on loan. He made his league debut against JEF United Chiba on 28 February 2016. Yamasaki scored his first league goals against Montedio Yamagata on 13 March 2016, scoring a brace.

On 26 December 2016, Yamasaki was announced at Tokushima Vortis on a permanent transfer. He made his league debut against Tokyo Verdy on 26 February 2017. Yamasaki scored his first league goal against Zweigen Kanazawa on 17 May 2017, scoring in the 35th minute.

On 2 July 2018, Yamasaki was announced at Shonan Bellmare.

On 5 January 2020, Yamasaki was announced at Nagoya Grampus. On 17 July 2021, he injured his left ankle ligament against Sagan Tosu.

On 24 December 2021, Yamasaki was announced at Kyoto Sanga. On 20 December 2022, the club extended his contract for the 2023 season.

On 12 July 2024, Yamasaki was announced at Cerezo Osaka. He made his league debut against Albirex Niigata on 20 July 2024. Yamasaki scored his first league goal against Consadole Sapporo on 3 November 2024, scoring in the 85th minute.

On 5 January 2025, Yamasaki announce official transfer to J2 club, V-Varen Nagasaki for 2025 season.

== Career statistics ==
=== Club ===
As of the start from 2025 season.

Club performance			League		Cup		League Cup		Continental		Other		Total				
Season	Club	League	Apps	Goals	Apps	Goals	Apps	Goals	Apps	Goals	Apps	Goals	Apps	Goals			
Japan			League		Emperor's Cup		J. League Cup		ACL		Other		Total				
2014	Sagan Tosu	J.League Div 1	0	0	–		2	0	–				2	0			
2015	Sagan Tosu	J1 League	1	0	0	0	4	0	–				5	0			
2016	Tokushima Vortis	J2 League	40	5	1	0	–						41	5			
2017	Tokushima Vortis	J2 League	34	14	0	0	–						34	14			
2018	Tokushima Vortis	J2 League	18	3	0	0	–						18	3			
2018	Shonan Bellmare	J1 League	16	4	0	0	5	1	–				21	5			
2019	Shonan Bellmare	J1 League	31	5	0	0	2	0	–		1	0	34	5			
2020	Nagoya Grampus	J1 League	26	1	–		4	1	–				30	1			
2021	Nagoya Grampus	J1 League	25	3	1	0	0	0	–				6	4	–	32	7
2022	Kyoto Sanga	J1 League	15	1	1	2	4	1	–				20	4			
2023	Kyoto Sanga	J1 League	22	2	1	0	3	2	–				26	4			
2024	Kyoto Sanga	J1 League	12	0	–		1	1	–				13	1			
2024	Cerezo Osaka	J1 League	14	1	–								14	1			
2025	V-Varen Nagasaki	J2 League	0	0	0	0	0	0	–				0	0			
Career total			254	35	13	5	24	5	6	4	1	0	298	49			

== Honours ==
Shonan Bellmare

- J.League Cup: 2018
