= Daiki Enomoto =

Japanese football player

Daiki Enomoto 榎本 大輝
Personal information
- Full name: Daiki Enomoto
- Date of birth: June 21, 1996 (age 30)
- Place of birth: Chiba, Japan
- Height: 1.63 m (5 ft 4 in)
- Position: Forward

Team information
- Current team: Biwako Shiga
- Number: 27

Youth career
- 2012–2014: Chuo Gakuin High School

College career
Years	Team	Apps	(Gls)
2015–2018	Tokai Gakuen University		

Senior career*
Years	Team	Apps	(Gls)
2018	→ Nagoya Grampus (loan)	2	(0)
2019–2021	Nagoya Grampus	2	(0)
2020	→ Tokushima Vortis (loan)	3	(0)
2021	→ Ehime FC (loan)	19	(1)
2022-	Biwako Shiga	0	(0)
- * Club domestic league appearances and goals as of 20:02, 30 April 2022 (UTC)

Daiki Enomoto (榎本 大輝, Enomoto Daiki; born June 21, 1996) is a Japanese football player who plays for Biwako Shiga.

== Playing career ==
Enomoto was born in Chiba Prefecture on June 21, 1996. He joined J1 League club Nagoya Grampus in 2018.
