= Kim Min-tae =

South Korean footballer

Kim Min-tae 김민태
Personal information
- Full name: Kim Min-tae
- Date of birth: 26 November 1993 (age 32)
- Place of birth: Incheon, South Korea
- Height: 1.87 m (6 ft 2 in)
- Position: Centre back

Team information
- Current team: FC Machida Zelvia
- Number: 24

Youth career
- 2009–2011: Bupyeong High School

College career
Years	Team	Apps	(Gls)
2012–2014	Kwangwoon University		

Senior career*
Years	Team	Apps	(Gls)
2015–2016	Vegalta Sendai	19	(4)
2017–2021	Hokkaido Consadole Sapporo	108	(1)
2021	→ Nagoya Grampus (loan)	12	(1)
2022–2024	Kashima Antlers	21	(1)
2023	→ Shonan Bellmare (loan)	12	(0)
2024–2026	Shonan Bellmare	47	(0)
2025	→ Shimizu S-Pulse (loan)	7	(0)
2026–	FC Machida Zelvia	1	(0)

International career
2015–2016	South Korea U23	10	(0)
- * Club domestic league appearances and goals as of 9 August 2026

- Kim Min-tae
- Hangul: 김민태
- Hanja: 金眠泰
- RR: Gim Mintae
- MR: Kim Mint'ae

Kim Min-tae (Korean: 김민태; born 26 November 1993) is a South Korean professional footballer who plays as a centre back for J1 League club FC Machida Zelvia.

== Club statistics ==
As of 25 March 2026.

Appearances and goals by club, season and competition
Club	Season	League			National cup (Note: Includes Emperors Cup)		League cup (Note: Includes J.League Cup)		Continental		Total	
Club	Season	Division	Apps	Goals	Apps	Goals	Apps	Goals	Apps	Goals	Apps	Goals
Vegalta Sendai	2015	J1 League	16	4	0	0	1	0	–		17	4
Vegalta Sendai	2016	J1 League	3	0	0	0	3	1	–		6	1
Vegalta Sendai	Total		19	4	0	0	4	1	0	0	23	5
Hokkaido Consadole Sapporo	2017	J1 League	16	0	0	0	4	0	–		20	0
Hokkaido Consadole Sapporo	2018	J1 League	27	0	3	0	0	0	–		30	0
Hokkaido Consadole Sapporo	2019	J1 League	29	0	1	0	12	2	–		42	2
Hokkaido Consadole Sapporo	2020	J1 League	27	1	0	0	3	0	–		30	1
Hokkaido Consadole Sapporo	2021	J1 League	9	0	2	0	4	0	–		15	0
Hokkaido Consadole Sapporo	Total		108	1	6	0	23	2	0	0	137	3
Nagoya Grampus (loan)	2021	J1 League	12	1	–		5	0	2 (Note: Appearances in AFC Champions League Elite)	0	19	1
Kashima Antlers	2022	J1 League	21	1	3	0	5	0	–		29	1
Kashima Antlers	2023	J1 League	0	0	1	1	4	0	–		5	1
Kashima Antlers	Total		21	1	4	1	9	0	0	0	34	2
Shonan Bellmare (loan)	2023	J1 League	12	0	0	0	0	0	–		12	0
Shonan Bellmare	2024	J1 League	32	0	0	0	1	0	–		33	0
Shonan Bellmare	2025	J1 League	15	0	1	1	1	0	–		17	1
Shonan Bellmare	Total		47	0	1	1	2	0	0	0	50	1
Shimizu S-Pulse (loan)	2025	J1 League	7	0	–		–		–		7	0
Career total			226	7	11	2	43	3	2	0	282	12

== Honours ==
Nagoya Grampus

- J.League Cup: 2021
