= Yuichi Maruyama =

Japanese footballer

Yuichi Maruyama 丸山 祐市
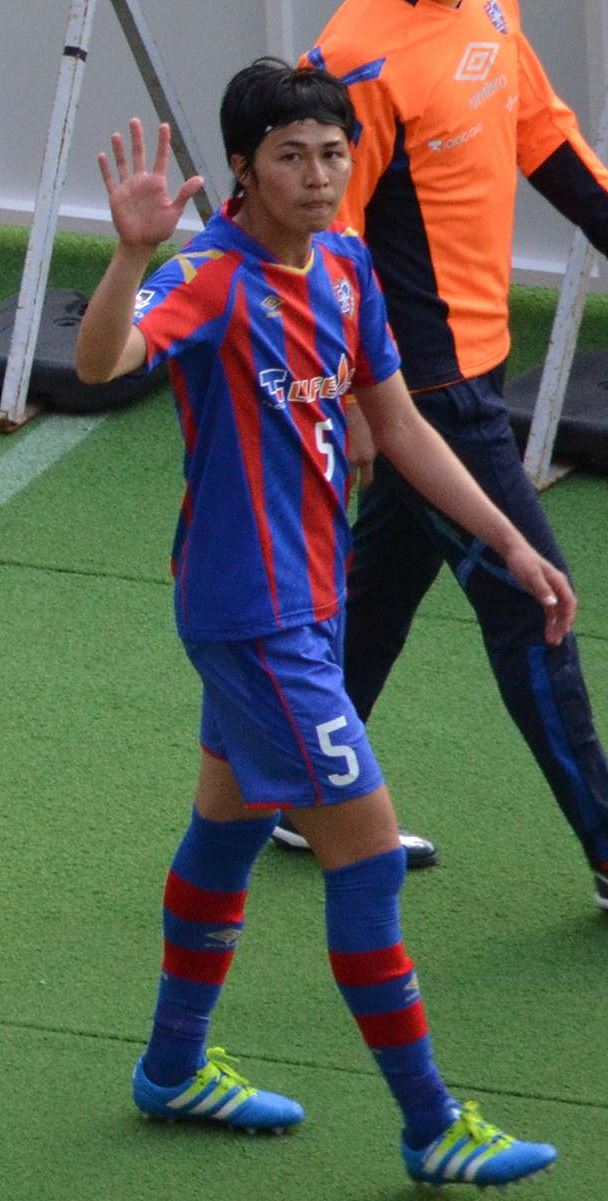

Personal information
- Full name: Yuichi Maruyama
- Date of birth: 16 June 1989 (age 37)
- Place of birth: Setagaya, Tokyo, Japan
- Height: 1.84 m (6 ft 0 in)
- Positions: Centre back; left back

Team information
- Current team: Kawasaki Frontale
- Number: 28

Youth career
- 1993–2001: Buddy SC
- 2002–2004: FC Tokyo
- 2005–2007: Kokugakuin University Kugayama High School

College career
Years	Team	Apps	(Gls)
2008–2011	Meiji University		

Senior career*
Years	Team	Apps	(Gls)
2012–2018	FC Tokyo	97	(2)
2014	→ Shonan Bellmare (loan)	41	(2)
2016	→ FC Tokyo U-23 (loan)	1	(0)
2018–2023	Nagoya Grampus	122	(2)
2024–	Kawasaki Frontale	46	(0)

International career
2016	Japan	2	(0)
- * Club domestic league appearances and goals as of 1 August 2026

Yuichi Maruyama (丸山 祐市, Maruyama Yuichi; born 16 June 1989) is a Japanese football player who plays for Kawasaki Frontale.

== Career ==
After gaining some playing-time with FC Tokyo and Shonan Bellmare, he has been called by Japan in August 2015.

On 4 July 2018, Nagoya Grampus announced the signing of Maruyama.

== International career ==
Maruyama has been called for some training camps, but in the end he received his first call-up on 26 May 2016 to face the 2016 Kirin Cup.

== Career statistics ==
=== Club ===
Updated to 19 July 2022.

Appearances and goals by club, season and competition
Club	Season	League			Emperor's Cup		J.League Cup		Asia		Total	
Club	Season	Division	Apps	Goals	Apps	Goals	Apps	Goals	Apps	Goals	Apps	Goals
FC Tokyo	2012	J1 League	3	0	1	0	2	0	1	0	7	0
FC Tokyo	2013	J1 League	0	0	3	0	1	0	–		4	0
FC Tokyo	2015	J1 League	20	0	1	0	6	0	–		27	0
FC Tokyo	2016	J1 League	34	0	1	0	0	0	7	0	42	0
FC Tokyo	2017	J1 League	31	2	1	0	7	0	–		39	2
FC Tokyo	2018	J1 League	9	0	1	0	3	0	–		13	0
FC Tokyo	Total		97	2	8	0	19	0	8	0	132	2
Shonan Bellmare (loan)	2014	J2 League	41	2	2	1	–		–		43	3
FC Tokyo U-23	2016	J3 League	1	0	–		–		–		1	0
Nagoya Grampus	2018	J1 League	18	0	0	0	0	0	–		18	0
Nagoya Grampus	2019	J1 League	28	0	0	0	4	0	–		32	0
Nagoya Grampus	2020	J1 League	34	2	–		4	1	–		38	3
Nagoya Grampus	2021	J1 League	17	1	0	0	0	0	–		17	1
Nagoya Grampus	2022	J1 League	14	0	1	0	3	1	–		18	1
Nagoya Grampus	Total		111	3	1	0	11	2	0	0	123	5
Total			250	7	11	1	30	2	8	0	299	10

=== International ===
Japan national team
Year	Apps	Goals
2016	2	0
Total	2	0

== Honours ==
=== Club ===
Kawasaki Frontale

- Japanese Super Cup: 2024
