= 2022 Nagoya Grampus season =

Nagoya Grampus
2022 season
- Chairman: Toyo Kato
- Manager: Kenta Hasegawa
- J1 League: 8th
- Emperor's Cup: Round of 16 vs Cerezo Osaka
- J. League Cup: Quarterfinal vs Urawa Red Diamonds
- Top goalscorer: League: Mateus (8); All: Mateus (13)
| Home colours | Away colours |

The 2022 Nagoya Grampus season was Nagoya Grampus' 5th season back in the J1 League following their relegation at the end of the 2016 season, their 29th J1 League season and 39th overall in the Japanese top flight. Nagoya Grampus participated in J1 League, the Emperor's Cup and the J. League Cup.

== Season events ==
On 18 December 2021, Nagoya Grampus announced the signing of Léo Silva from Kashima Antlers.

On 21 December 2021, Nagoya Grampus announced the signing of Noriyoshi Sakai from Sagan Tosu. Four days later, 25 December 2021, Keiya Sento also joined Nagoya Grampus from Sagan Tosu.

On 26 December 2021, Nagoya Grampus announced the signing of Akinari Kawazura from Omiya Ardija.

On 29 December 2021, Nagoya Grampus announced the signing of Tiago Pagnussat on loan from Cerezo Osaka.

On 6 January, Nagoya Grampus announced the signing of Thales Paula from Roasso Kumamoto, with the midfielder being loan backed to Roasso Kumamoto for the 2022 season.

On 28 March, Nagoya Grampus announced the loan signing of Takuya Uchida from FC Tokyo until 31 January 2023.

On 30 June, Nagoya Grampus announced that Manabu Saitō had been sold to Suwon Samsung Bluewings.

On 1 July, Nagoya Grampus announced the signing of Naldinho from Chongqing Liangjiang Athletic.

On 7 July, Nagoya Grampus announced the loan signing of Ryota Nagaki from Shonan Bellmare until 31 January 2023, and the permanent signing of Takuya Shigehiro from Avispa Fukuoka.

On 11 July, Nagoya Grampus announced the return of Kensuke Nagai from FC Tokyo.

On 18 August, Nagoya Grampus announced that Mu Kanazaki had been sold to Oita Trinita.

On 22 November, Nagoya Grampus confirmed that Tiago Pagnussat's loan deal with the club had expired.

== Squad ==
As of match played 5 November 2022

| No. | Name | Nationality | Position | Date of birth (age) | Signed from | Signed in | Contract ends | Apps. | Goals |
Goalkeepers
| 1 | Mitchell Langerak | (Australia) | GK | 22 August 1988 (aged 34) | Levante | 2018 | | 202 | 0 |
| 18 | Tsubasa Shibuya | (Japan) | GK | 27 January 1995 (aged 27) | Yokohama | 2017 | | 8 | 0 |
| 21 | Yohei Takeda | (Japan) | GK | 30 June 1987 (aged 35) | Oita Trinita | 2016 | | 46 | 0 |
| 22 | John Higashi | (Japan) | GK | 2 May 2002 (aged 20) | Academy | 2021 | | 0 | 0 |
| 39 | Masaharu Kitahashi | (Japan) | GK | 9 July 2004 (aged 18) | Academy | 2022 | | 0 | 0 |
Defenders
| 2 | Tiago Pagnussat | (Brazil) | DF | 17 June 1990 (aged 32) | on loan from Cerezo Osaka | 2022 | 2023 | 22 | 0 |
| 3 | Yuichi Maruyama | (Japan) | DF | 16 June 1989 (aged 33) | FC Tokyo | 2018 | | 136 | 3 |
| 4 | Shinnosuke Nakatani | (Japan) | DF | 24 March 1996 (aged 26) | Kashiwa Reysol | 2018 | | 191 | 7 |
| 6 | Kazuya Miyahara | (Japan) | DF | 22 March 1996 (aged 26) | Sanfrecce Hiroshima | 2019 | | 182 | 4 |
| 13 | Haruya Fujii | (Japan) | DF | 26 December 2000 (aged 21) | Academy | 2018 | | 64 | 2 |
| 17 | Ryoya Morishita | (Japan) | DF | 11 April 1997 (aged 25) | Sagan Tosu | 2021 | | 80 | 2 |
| 23 | Yutaka Yoshida | (Japan) | DF | 17 February 1990 (aged 32) | Sagan Tosu | 2019 | | 140 | 3 |
| 24 | Akinari Kawazura | (Japan) | DF | 3 May 1994 (aged 28) | Omiya Ardija | 2022 | | 6 | 0 |
| 38 | Soma Ota | (Japan) | DF | 1 July 2005 (aged 17) | Academy | 2022 | | 0 | 0 |
| 41 | Kensho Kojima | (Japan) | DF | 14 July 2004 (aged 18) | Academy | 2022 | | 0 | 0 |
Midfielders
| 5 | Kazuki Nagasawa | (Japan) | MF | 16 December 1991 (aged 30) | Urawa Red Diamonds | 2021 | | 55 | 1 |
| 9 | Noriyoshi Sakai | (Japan) | MF | 9 November 1992 (aged 29) | Sagan Tosu | 2022 | | 23 | 3 |
| 10 | Mateus | (Brazil) | MF | 11 September 1994 (aged 28) | Omiya Ardija | 2019 | | 145 | 42 |
| 11 | Yuki Soma | (Japan) | MF | 25 February 1997 (aged 25) | Academy | 2018 | | 160 | 13 |
| 14 | Keiya Sento | (Japan) | MF | 29 December 1994 (aged 27) | Sagan Tosu | 2022 | | 45 | 2 |
| 15 | Sho Inagaki | (Japan) | MF | 25 December 1991 (aged 30) | Sanfrecce Hiroshima | 2020 | | 136 | 18 |
| 16 | Léo Silva | (Brazil) | MF | 24 December 1985 (aged 36) | Kashima Antlers | 2022 | | 43 | 1 |
| 19 | Takuya Shigehiro | (Japan) | MF | 5 May 1995 (aged 27) | Avispa Fukuoka | 2022 | | 11 | 1 |
| 20 | Ryota Nagaki | (Japan) | MF | 4 June 1988 (aged 34) | on loan from Shonan Bellmare | 2022 | 2023 | 14 | 0 |
| 31 | Haruki Yoshida | (Japan) | MF | 29 April 2003 (aged 19) | Academy | 2022 | | 7 | 1 |
| 33 | Hidemasa Koda | (Japan) | MF | 2 October 2003 (aged 19) | Academy | 2022 | | 12 | 0 |
| 34 | Takuya Uchida | (Japan) | MF | 2 June 1998 (aged 24) | on loan from FC Tokyo | 2022 | 2023 | 23 | 0 |
| 35 | Seiryo Usui | (Japan) | MF | 17 June 2004 (aged 18) | Academy | 2022 | | 2 | 0 |
| 36 | Haruto Suzuki | (Japan) | MF | 17 May 2005 (aged 17) | Academy | 2022 | | 0 | 0 |
| 37 | Kosuke Uchida | (Japan) | MF | 25 July 2005 (aged 17) | Academy | 2022 | | 0 | 0 |
| 46 | Ryotaro Ishida | (Japan) | MF | 13 December 2001 (aged 20) | Academy | 2018 | | 27 | 1 |
Forwards
| 8 | Yoichiro Kakitani | (Japan) | FW | 3 January 1990 (aged 32) | Cerezo Osaka | 2021 | | 81 | 10 |
| 29 | Naldinho | (Brazil) | FW | 22 October 1992 (aged 30) | Chongqing Liangjiang Athletic | 2022 | | 9 | 0 |
| 32 | Koki Toyoda | (Japan) | FW | 11 April 2003 (aged 19) | Academy | 2022 | | 2 | 0 |
| 42 | Ryoga Kida | (Japan) | FW | 15 July 2005 (aged 17) | Academy | 2022 | | 2 | 0 |
| 45 | Kensuke Nagai | (Japan) | FW | 5 March 1989 (aged 33) | FC Tokyo | 2022 | | 217 | 63 |
| 47 | Kyota Sakakibara | (Japan) | FW | 20 October 2001 (aged 21) | Academy | 2022 | | 0 | 0 |
Also under contract
| 40 | Jakub Świerczok | (Poland) | FW | 28 December 1992 (aged 29) | Piast Gliwice | 2021 | | 21 | 12 |
Away on loan
| | Daiki Mitsui | (Japan) | GK | 27 May 2001 (aged 21) | Academy | 2020 | | 0 | 0 |
| | Shumpei Naruse | (Japan) | DF | 17 January 2001 (aged 21) | Academy | 2018 | | 63 | 0 |
| | Akira Yoshida | (Japan) | DF | 9 July 2001 (aged 21) | Academy | 2020 | | 2 | 0 |
| | Thales Paula | (Brazil) | MF | 29 June 2001 (aged 21) | Roasso Kumamoto | 2022 | | 0 | 0 |
| | Hiroyuki Abe | (Japan) | MF | 5 July 1989 (aged 33) | Kawasaki Frontale | 2020 | | 68 | 10 |
| | Takuji Yonemoto | (Japan) | MF | 3 December 1990 (aged 31) | Tokyo | 2019 | | 98 | 1 |
| | Naoki Maeda | (Japan) | MF | 17 November 1995 (aged 26) | Matsumoto Yamaga | 2018 | | 141 | 28 |
Left during the season
| 19 | Manabu Saitō | (Japan) | MF | 4 April 1990 (aged 32) | Kawasaki Frontale | 2021 | | 43 | 2 |
| 44 | Mu Kanazaki | (Japan) | MF | 16 February 1989 (aged 33) | Sagan Tosu | 2021 | | 148 | 23 |

== Transfers ==
=== In ===
| Date | Position | Nationality | Name | From | Fee | Ref. |
|---|---|---|---|---|---|---|
| 18 December 2021 | MF | (Brazil) | Léo Silva | Kashima Antlers | Undisclosed | |
| 21 December 2021 | MF | (Japan) | Noriyoshi Sakai | Sagan Tosu | Undisclosed | |
| 25 December 2021 | MF | (Japan) | Keiya Sento | Sagan Tosu | Undisclosed | |
| 26 December 2021 | DF | (Japan) | Akinari Kawazura | Omiya Ardija | Undisclosed | |
| 6 January 2022 | MF | (Brazil) | Thales Paula | Roasso Kumamoto | Undisclosed | |
| 1 July 2022 | FW | (Brazil) | Naldinho | Chongqing Liangjiang Athletic | Undisclosed | |
| 7 July 2022 | MF | (Japan) | Takuya Shigehiro | Avispa Fukuoka | Undisclosed | |
| 11 July 2022 | FW | (Japan) | Kensuke Nagai | FC Tokyo | Undisclosed | |

=== Loans in ===
| Date from | Position | Nationality | Name | From | Date to | Ref. |
|---|---|---|---|---|---|---|
| 29 December 2021 | DF | (Brazil) | Tiago Pagnussat | Cerezo Osaka | 22 November 2022 | |
| 28 March 2022 | MF | (Japan) | Takuya Uchida | FC Tokyo | 31 January 2023 | |
| 7 July 2022 | MF | (Japan) | Ryota Nagaki | Shonan Bellmare | 31 January 2023 | |

=== Out ===
| Date | Position | Nationality | Name | To | Fee | Ref. |
|---|---|---|---|---|---|---|
| 30 June 2022 | MF | (Japan) | Manabu Saitō | Suwon Samsung Bluewings | Undisclosed | |
| 18 August 2022 | MF | (Japan) | Mu Kanazaki | Oita Trinita | Undisclosed | |
| 7 December 2022 | MF | (Japan) | Keiya Sento | Kashiwa Reysol | Undisclosed | |
| 29 December 2022 | DF | (Japan) | Yutaka Yoshida | Shimizu S-Pulse | Undisclosed | |

=== Loans out ===
| Date from | Position | Nationality | Name | To | Date to | Ref. |
|---|---|---|---|---|---|---|
| 6 January 2022 | MF | (Brazil) | Thales Paula | Roasso Kumamoto | 31 January 2023 | |

=== Released ===
| Date | Position | Nationality | Name | Joined | Date | Ref. |
|---|---|---|---|---|---|---|
| 31 December 2022 | MF | (Japan) | Kazuya Miyahara | Tokyo Verdy | 1 January 2023 | |
| 31 December 2022 | MF | (Brazil) | Léo Silva | Moto Club | 27 January 2023 | |

== Friendlies ==
| 25 November 2022 | Nagoya Grampus | 0–0 | Roma | Toyota |
| 19:30 JST (UTC+9) | | Report | El Shaarawy (yellow card) 34' | Stadium: Toyota Stadium; Attendance: 13,383; Referee: Yoshiro Imamura |

== Competitions ==
=== J. League ===
==== Results summary ====
| Overall | | | | | | | | Home | | | | | | Away | | | | | |
| Pld | W | D | L | GF | GA | GD | Pts | W | D | L | GF | GA | GD | W | D | L | GF | GA | GD |
|---|---|---|---|---|---|---|---|---|---|---|---|---|---|---|---|---|---|---|---|
| 34 | 11 | 13 | 10 | 30 | 35 | −5 | 46 | 7 | 6 | 4 | 17 | 17 | 0 | 4 | 7 | 6 | 13 | 18 | −5 |

Last updated: 5 November 2022.
Source: see below

==== Results by round ====
| Round | 1 | 2 | 3 | 4 | 5 | 6 | 7 | 8 | 9 | 10 | 11 | 12 | 13 | 14 | 15 | 16 | 17 | 18 | 19 | 20 | 21 | 22 | 23 | 24 | 25 | 26 | 27 | 28 | 29 | 30 | 31 | 32 | 33 | 34 |
|---|---|---|---|---|---|---|---|---|---|---|---|---|---|---|---|---|---|---|---|---|---|---|---|---|---|---|---|---|---|---|---|---|---|---|
| Ground | H | H | A | H | A | H | H | A | A | A | H | A | H | A | H | A | A | H | A | A | H | A | H | A | H | H | A | A | H | H | H | A | H | A |
| Result | W | D | L | D | L | W | L | D | D | L | D | L | W | W | W | L | L | D | D | W | L | D | W | D | W | L | W | D | D | D | L | D | W | W |
| Position | | | | | | | | | | | | | | | | | | | | | | | | | | | | | | | | | | |

Updated to match(es) played on 5 November 2022. Source: See Below
A = Away; H = Home; W = Win; D = Draw; L = Loss

==== Results ====
| 19 February 2022 1 | Nagoya Grampus | 2–0 | Vissel Kobe | Toyota |
| 15:00 JST (UTC+9) | Inagaki 23'; Sakai 51' (o.g.) | Report | Ogihara (yellow card) 18' (red card) 58'; Osaki (yellow card) 59'; Lincoln (yellow card) 90' | Stadium: Toyota Stadium; Referee: Ryo Tanimoto |

| 6 March 2022 3 | Nagoya Grampus | 1–1 | Sagan Tosu | Toyota |
| 14:00 JST (UTC+9) | Fukuta 2' (o.g.); Y.Yoshida (yellow card) 88' | Report | Fukuta 30'; Koizumi (yellow card) 80' | Stadium: Toyota Stadium; Referee: Masuya Ueda |

| 12 March 2022 4 | Kawasaki Frontale | 1–0 | Nagoya Grampus | Kawasaki |
| 17:00 JST (UTC+9) | Songkrasin (yellow card) 15'; Marcinho 25' | Report | Morishita (yellow card) 75' | Stadium: Kawasaki Todoroki Stadium; Referee: Jumpei Iida |

| 20 March 2022 5 | Nagoya Grampus | 1–1 | Kashiwa Reysol | Toyota |
| 14:00 JST (UTC+9) | Mateus 18'; Pagnussat (yellow card) 27'; Morishita (yellow card) 55' | Report | Hosoya 6'; Dodi (yellow card) 31'; Sávio (yellow card) 79'; Toshima (yellow card) 90+4' | Stadium: Toyota Stadium; Referee: Yoshiro Imamura |

| 2 April 2022 6 | Gamba Osaka | 3–1 | Nagoya Grampus | Suita |
| 14:00 JST (UTC+9) | Patric 26'; Miyahara 54' (o.g.); Kurokawa 62' | Report | Sento 83' | Stadium: Panasonic Stadium Suita; Referee: Koichiro Fukushima |

| 6 April 2022 7 | Nagoya Grampus | 2–1 | Shonan Bellmare | Toyota |
| 19:30 JST (UTC+9) | Sento (yellow card) 20'; Fukushima 49' (o.g.); Mateus (yellow card) 77'; Morishita (yellow card) 85'; Abe 90+1' (pen.) | Report | Ohashi 8'; Ishihara (red card) 89' | Stadium: Toyota Stadium; Referee: Futoshi Nakamura |

| 10 April 2022 8 | Nagoya Grampus | 0–2 | Hokkaido Consadole Sapporo | Toyota |
| 15:00 JST (UTC+9) | Fujii (yellow card) 82'; Silva (yellow card) 90' | Report | Miyazawa 49'; Nakashima 63'; Takamine (yellow card) 89' | Stadium: Toyota Stadium; Referee: Yudai Yamamoto |

| 17 April 2022 9 | Kashima Antlers | 0–0 | Nagoya Grampus | Kashima |
| 15:00 JST (UTC+9) | Arthur (yellow card) 34'; Misao (yellow card) 53'; Suzuki (yellow card) 66' | Report | T.Uchida (yellow card) 90+6' | Stadium: Kashima Soccer Stadium; Referee: Hajime Matsuo |

| 20 April 2022 2 | Tokyo | 0–0 | Nagoya Grampus | Tokyo |
| 19:00 JST (UTC+9) | | Report | | Stadium: Ajinomoto Stadium; Referee: Akihiko Ikeuchi |

| 28 April 2022 10 | Júbilo Iwata | 2–1 | Nagoya Grampus | Iwata |
| 19:00 JST (UTC+9) | Sugimoto (yellow card) 65'; Ōtsu 83', 85' | Report | Mateus 43' | Stadium: Yamaha Stadium; Referee: Hiroki Kasahara |

| 3 May 2022 11 | Nagoya Grampus | 1–1 | Kyoto Sanga | Toyota |
| 14:00 JST (UTC+9) | Mateus 35'; Sakai (yellow card) 61' | Report | Utaka 40'; Mendes (yellow card) 42' | Stadium: Toyota Stadium; Referee: Yuichi Nishimura |

| 7 May 2022 12 | Yokohama F. Marinos | 2–1 | Nagoya Grampus | Yokohama |
| 15:00 JST (UTC+9) | Nagato (yellow card) 5'; Élber 35'; Anderson Lopes 86' | Report | Fujii (yellow card) 10'; Nakatani 24' | Stadium: Nissan Stadium; Referee: Ryuji Sato |

| 14 May 2022 13 | Nagoya Grampus | 1–0 | Cerezo Osaka | Toyota |
| 14:00 JST (UTC+9) | Fujii (yellow card) 4'; Sento 6' | Report | Maikuma (yellow card) 38' | Stadium: Toyota Stadium; Referee: Futoshi Nakamura |

| 21 May 2022 14 | Shimizu S-Pulse | 1–2 | Nagoya Grampus | Shizuoka |
| 14:00 JST (UTC+9) | Carlinhos Júnior (yellow card) 68'; Thiago Santana 72' | Report | Sakai 22'; Soma 90+4' | Stadium: IAI Stadium Nihondaira; Referee: Takafumi Mikuriya |

| 25 May 2022 15 | Nagoya Grampus | 1–0 | Avispa Fukuoka | Toyota |
| 19:30 JST (UTC+9) | Nakatani 15'; Pagnussat (red card) 43' | Report | Lukian (yellow card) 25'; Mae (yellow card) 28'; Yanagi (yellow card) 66' | Stadium: Toyota Stadium; Referee: Hajime Matsuo |

| 28 May 2022 16 | Sanfrecce Hiroshima | 1–0 | Nagoya Grampus | Hiroshima |
| 14:00 JST (UTC+9) | Notsuda 58'; Fujii (yellow card) 89' | Report | | Stadium: Edion Stadium Hiroshima; Referee: Yuichi Nishimura |

| 18 June 2022 17 | Urawa Red Diamonds | 3–0 | Nagoya Grampus | Saitama |
| 19:00 JST (UTC+9) | Scholz 21'; Ito 23'; Iwanami (yellow card) 30'; Sekine 36' | Report | Mateus (yellow card) 42'; Nakatani (yellow card) 50' | Stadium: Saitama Stadium 2002; Referee: Koichiro Fukushima |

| 26 June 2022 18 | Nagoya Grampus | 1–1 | Kashima Antlers | Toyota |
| 18:00 JST (UTC+9) | Morishita (yellow card) 39'; Mateus 52' (pen.) | Report | Nakama 33'; Hirose (yellow card) 36'; Misao (yellow card) 45+2' | Stadium: Toyota Stadium; Referee: Koichiro Fukushima |

| 2 July 2022 19 | Shonan Bellmare | 0–0 | Nagoya Grampus | Hiratsuka |
| 19:00 JST (UTC+9) | | Report | | Stadium: Lemon Gas Stadium Hiratsuka; Referee: Hayato Shimizu |

| 6 July 2022 20 | Kashiwa Reysol | 0–1 | Nagoya Grampus | Kashiwa |
| 19:00 JST (UTC+9) | Ominami (yellow card) 57' | Report | Mateus 4'; Fujii (yellow card) 67'; Ishida (yellow card) 84'; Soma (yellow card) 90+5' | Stadium: Sankyo Frontier Kashiwa Stadium; Referee: Hajime Matsuo |

| 10 July 2022 21 | Nagoya Grampus | 0–2 | Shimizu S-Pulse | Toyota |
| 18:00 JST (UTC+9) | Yoshida (red card) 88' | Report | Nishizawa 38'; Thiago Santana 90+5'; Katayama (yellow card) 90+7' | Stadium: Toyota Stadium; Referee: Tomohiro Inoue |

| 30 July 2022 23 | Hokkaido Consadole Sapporo | 2–2 | Nagoya Grampus | Sapporo |
| 14:00 JST (UTC+9) | Fukai 31'; Miyazawa (yellow card) 57'; Nakashima (yellow card) 75'; Suga (yellow card) 89'; Aoki 90+2'; Tučić (yellow card) 90+6' | Report | Morishita (yellow card) 39'; Silva 67'; Mateus 81' | Stadium: Sapporo Dome; Referee: Yoshiro Imamura |

| 6 August 2022 24 | Nagoya Grampus | 3–0 | Urawa Red Diamonds | Toyota |
| 19:00 JST (UTC+9) | Shigehiro 27'; Mateus 45+4'; Nakatani (yellow card) 59'; Nagai 64' (yellow card) 74' | Report | | Stadium: Toyota Stadium; Referee: Jumpei Iida |

| 14 August 2022 25 | Sagan Tosu | 0–0 | Nagoya Grampus | Tosu |
| 19:00 JST (UTC+9) | Tezuka (yellow card) 90+1' | Report | Inagaki (yellow card) 71' | Stadium: Ekimae Real Estate Stadium; Referee: Tomohiro Inoue |

| 19 August 2022 26 | Nagoya Grampus | 1–0 | Júbilo Iwata | Toyota |
| 19:30 JST (UTC+9) | Mateus 19' | Report | Ito (yellow card) 32'; Yamamoto (yellow card) 44' | Stadium: Toyota Stadium; Referee: Koichiro Fukushima |

| 27 August 2022 27 | Nagoya Grampus | 0–2 | Gamba Osaka | Toyota |
| 18:00 JST (UTC+9) | Shigehiro (yellow card) 51' | Report | Patric 3'; Meshino (yellow card) 27'; Dawhan (yellow card) 56'; Kwon (yellow card) 77'; Suzuki 87' | Stadium: Toyota Stadium; Referee: Hiroki Kasahara |

| 3 September 2022 28 | Avispa Fukuoka | 2–3 | Nagoya Grampus | Fukuoka |
| 19:00 JST (UTC+9) | Croux 21'; Hiratsuka 57'; Miya (red card) 67'; Nara (yellow card) 90+1' | Report | Morishita 2'; Nagai 24', 38' | Stadium: Best Denki Stadium; Referee: Futoshi Nakamura |

| 10 September 2022 29 | Vissel Kobe | 0–0 | Nagoya Grampus | Kobe |
| 19:00 JST (UTC+9) | Goke (yellow card) 62'; Yuruki (yellow card) 87' | Report | | Stadium: Noevir Stadium Kobe; Referee: Hayato Shimizu |

| 14 September 2022 22 | Nagoya Grampus | 1–1 | Kawasaki Frontale | Toyota |
| 19:30 JST (UTC+9) | Inagaki 74'; Nakatani (yellow card) 84' | Report | Yamane (yellow card) 34'; Tachibanada (yellow card) 43' (goal) 61'; Schmidt (yellow card) 70'; Sasaki (yellow card) 90+4' | Stadium: Toyota Stadium; Referee: Yusuke Araki |

| 17 September 2022 30 | Nagoya Grampus | 0–0 | Sanfrecce Hiroshima | Toyota |
| 19:00 JST (UTC+9) | T.Uchida (yellow card) 12'; Soma (yellow card) 29'; Inagaki (yellow card) 58' | Report | | Stadium: Toyota Stadium; Referee: Ryuji Sato |

| 1 October 2022 31 | Nagoya Grampus | 0–4 | Yokohama F. Marinos | Toyota |
| 16:00 JST (UTC+9) | Mateus (yellow card) 26'; Soma (yellow card) 82' | Report | Mizunuma 16', 46'; Watanabe (yellow card) 56'; Léo Ceará 90'; Fujita 90+6' | Stadium: Toyota Stadium; Referee: Hajime Matsuo |

| 8 October 2022 32 | Kyoto Sanga | 1–1 | Nagoya Grampus | Kameoka |
| 14:00 JST (UTC+9) | Taketomi (penalty missed) 29'; Inoue 59'; Mendes (yellow card) 90+4' | Report | Takeda 45' (o.g.) | Stadium: Sanga Stadium by Kyocera; Referee: Koichiro Fukushima |

| 29 October 2022 33 | Nagoya Grampus | 2–1 | Tokyo | Toyota |
| 15:00 JST (UTC+9) | Sakai 10'; Nagai 69' | Report | Luiz Phellype (yellow card) 31'; Bangnagande (yellow card) 41'; Kimoto 49' | Stadium: Toyota Stadium; Referee: Koei Koya |

| 5 November 2022 34 | Cerezo Osaka | 0–1 | Nagoya Grampus | Osaka |
| 14:00 JST (UTC+9) | Jean Patric (yellow card) 65'; Kim (red card) 68'; Suzuki (yellow card) 85' | Report | Mateus (yellow card) 90+4'; Soma 90+7' | Stadium: Yanmar Stadium Nagai; Referee: Hiroki Kasahara |

==== League table ====
| Pos | Team | Pld | W | D | L | GF | GA | GD | Pts | Qualification or relegation |
|---|---|---|---|---|---|---|---|---|---|---|
| 6 | FC Tokyo | 34 | 14 | 7 | 13 | 46 | 43 | +3 | 49 | |
| 7 | Kashiwa Reysol | 34 | 13 | 8 | 13 | 43 | 44 | −1 | 47 | |
| 8 | Nagoya Grampus | 34 | 11 | 13 | 10 | 30 | 35 | −5 | 46 | |
| 9 | Urawa Red Diamonds | 34 | 10 | 15 | 9 | 48 | 39 | +9 | 45 | Qualification for the AFC Champions League play-off round (Note: Urawa Red Diamonds won the Champions League but did not qualify for the Champions League via league position. As a result, the last spot distributed to the third-placed team was transferred to Urawa Red Diamonds pursuant to the rules that Champions League winners would guaranteed a Champions League spot.) |
| 10 | Hokkaido Consadole Sapporo | 34 | 11 | 12 | 11 | 45 | 55 | −10 | 45 | |

Source: J.League Data Site
Rules for classification: 1) Points; 2) Goal difference; 3) Goals scored; 4) Head-to-head points; 5) Head-to-head goal difference; 6) Head-to-head goals scored; 7) Fewer disciplinary points.

=== Emperor's Cup ===
| 1 June 2022 Second round | Nagoya Grampus | 2−0 | Doshisha University | Nagoya |
| 19:00 JST (UTC+9) | Abe 47'; Mateus 88' | Report | | Stadium: Paloma Mizuho Stadium; Attendance: 3,909; Referee: Yoshiro Imamura |

| 22 June 2022 Third round | Nagoya Grampus | 1−0 | Zweigen Kanazawa | Kanazawa |
| 19:00 JST (UTC+9) | Abe 51' | Report | | Stadium: Ishikawa Athletics Stadium; Attendance: 2,959; Referee: Ryo Tanimoto |

| 13 July 2022 Round of 16 | Nagoya Grampus | 1−2 | Cerezo Osaka | Osaka |
| 18:30 JST (UTC+9) | Mateus 69' | Report | Fujii 7' (o.g.); Tameda 88' | Stadium: Yodoko Sakura Stadium; Attendance: 3,734; Referee: Hiroki Kasahara |

=== J. League Cup ===
==== Group stage ====
| Pos | Team | Pld | W | D | L | GF | GA | GD | Pts | Qualification |
|---|---|---|---|---|---|---|---|---|---|---|
| 1 | Sanfrecce Hiroshima | 6 | 4 | 0 | 2 | 13 | 5 | +8 | 12 | Advance to play-off stage |
| 2 | Nagoya Grampus | 6 | 3 | 1 | 2 | 6 | 4 | +2 | 10 | Advance to play-off stage |
| 3 | Shimizu S-Pulse | 6 | 2 | 2 | 2 | 6 | 8 | −2 | 8 | |
| 4 | Tokushima Vortis | 6 | 1 | 1 | 4 | 5 | 13 | −8 | 4 | |

Source: JLeague.co (EN), JLeague.jp (JA)
Rules for classification: Tiebreakers

| 23 February 2022 1 | Nagoya Grampus | 0–0 | Shimizu S-Pulse | Toyota |
| 14:03 JST (UTC+9) | | Report | | Stadium: Toyota Stadium; Attendance: 8,285; Referee: Hiroyoshi Takayama |

| 2 March 2022 2 | Sanfrecce Hiroshima | 2–0 | Nagoya Grampus | Hiroshima |
| 19:03 JST (UTC+9) | Mitsuta 44'; Júnior Santos 87' | Report | | Stadium: Edion Stadium Hiroshima; Attendance: 1,870; Referee: Tetsuro Yoshida |

| 26 March 2022 3 | Nagoya Grampus | 2–0 | Tokushima Vortis | Toyota |
| 14:03 JST (UTC+9) | Sakai 72'; Kakitani 75' | Report | | Stadium: Toyota Stadium; Attendance: 6,932; Referee: Koei Koya |

| 13 April 2022 4 | Nagoya Grampus | 1–2 | Sanfrecce Hiroshima | Toyota |
| 19:33 JST (UTC+9) | Mateus 10' | Report | Júnior Santos 50'; Morishima 84' | Stadium: Toyota Stadium; Attendance: 4,689; Referee: Koki Nagamine |

| 23 April 2022 5 | Shimizu S-Pulse | 0–1 | Nagoya Grampus | Shizuoka |
| 14:03 JST (UTC+9) | | Report | Kanazaki 67' (pen.) | Stadium: IAI Stadium Nihondaira; Attendance: 7,688; Referee: Kazuyoshi Enomoto |

| 18 May 2022 6 | Tokushima Vortis | 0–2 | Nagoya Grampus | Naruto |
| 19:03 JST (UTC+9) | | Report | Yoshida 10'; Abe 45+1' | Stadium: Pocarisweat Stadium; Attendance: 2,296; Referee: Akihiko Ikeuchi |

==== Knockout stage ====
| 4 June 2022 Play-off stage 1st leg | Nagoya Grampus | 6–1 | Kyoto Sanga | Nagoya |
| 16:03 JST (UTC+9) | Inagaki 15', 49'; Maruyama 63'; Mateus 73', 81'; Soma 90+2' | Report | Yamasaki 58' | Stadium: CS-asset Minato Stadium; Attendance: 5,234; Referee: Koei Koya |

| 11 June 2022 Play-off stage 2nd leg | Kyoto Sanga | 0–1 (1–7 agg.) | Nagoya Grampus | Kameoka |
| 18:33 JST (UTC+9) | | Report | Saitō 90+1' | Stadium: Sanga Stadium by Kyocera; Attendance: 5,831; Referee: Takuto Okabe |

| 3 August 2022 Quarterfinal 1st leg | Nagoya Grampus | 1–1 | Urawa Red Diamonds | Aichi |
| 19:33 JST (UTC+9) | Morishita 59' | Report | Matsuo 36' | Stadium: Toyota Stadium; Attendance: 6,179; Referee: Ryo Tanimoto |

| 10 August 2022 Quarterfinal 2nd leg | Urawa Red Diamonds | 3–0 (4–1 agg.) | Nagoya Grampus | Saitama |
| 19:33 JST (UTC+9) | Ito 31', 41'; Esaka 86' | Report | | Stadium: Saitama Stadium 2002; Attendance: 23,435; Referee: Yuichi Nishimura |

== Squad statistics ==
As of match played 5 November 2022

=== Appearances and goals ===
| No. | Pos | Nat | Player | Total | | J-League | | Emperor's Cup | | J-League Cup | |
| No. | Pos | Nat | Player | Apps | Goals | Apps | Goals | Apps | Goals | Apps | Goals |
|---|---|---|---|---|---|---|---|---|---|---|---|
| 1 | GK | (Australia) AUS | Mitchell Langerak | 41 | 0 | 33 | 0 | 1 | 0 | 7 | 0 |
| 2 | DF | (Brazil) BRA | Tiago Pagnussat | 22 | 0 | 8+6 | 0 | 2 | 0 | 5+1 | 0 |
| 3 | DF | (Japan) JPN | Yuichi Maruyama | 31 | 1 | 25 | 0 | 1 | 0 | 3+2 | 1 |
| 4 | DF | (Japan) JPN | Shinnosuke Nakatani | 43 | 2 | 33 | 2 | 1+1 | 0 | 6+2 | 0 |
| 5 | MF | (Japan) JPN | Kazuki Nagasawa | 8 | 0 | 0+4 | 0 | 0 | 0 | 3+1 | 0 |
| 6 | DF | (Japan) JPN | Kazuya Miyahara | 28 | 0 | 7+14 | 0 | 1 | 0 | 5+1 | 0 |
| 8 | FW | (Japan) JPN | Yoichiro Kakitani | 29 | 1 | 11+10 | 0 | 1+1 | 0 | 4+2 | 1 |
| 9 | MF | (Japan) JPN | Noriyoshi Sakai | 23 | 3 | 10+7 | 2 | 0+1 | 0 | 2+3 | 1 |
| 10 | MF | (Brazil) BRA | Mateus | 40 | 13 | 30 | 8 | 0+3 | 2 | 6+1 | 3 |
| 11 | MF | (Japan) JPN | Yuki Soma | 45 | 3 | 29+5 | 2 | 1 | 0 | 6+4 | 1 |
| 13 | DF | (Japan) JPN | Haruya Fujii | 43 | 1 | 28+3 | 1 | 2+1 | 0 | 8+1 | 0 |
| 14 | MF | (Japan) JPN | Keiya Sento | 45 | 2 | 27+7 | 2 | 3 | 0 | 5+3 | 0 |
| 15 | MF | (Japan) JPN | Sho Inagaki | 45 | 4 | 34 | 2 | 0+1 | 0 | 7+3 | 2 |
| 16 | MF | (Brazil) BRA | Léo Silva | 43 | 1 | 29+4 | 1 | 1+2 | 0 | 6+1 | 0 |
| 17 | DF | (Japan) JPN | Ryoya Morishita | 42 | 2 | 28+4 | 1 | 0+2 | 0 | 7+1 | 1 |
| 19 | MF | (Japan) JPN | Takuya Shigehiro | 11 | 1 | 8+1 | 1 | 0 | 0 | 2 | 0 |
| 20 | MF | (Japan) JPN | Ryota Nagaki | 14 | 0 | 4+8 | 0 | 0 | 0 | 2 | 0 |
| 21 | GK | (Japan) JPN | Yohei Takeda | 7 | 0 | 1+1 | 0 | 2 | 0 | 3 | 0 |
| 23 | DF | (Japan) JPN | Yutaka Yoshida | 19 | 0 | 8+7 | 0 | 0 | 0 | 3+1 | 0 |
| 24 | DF | (Japan) JPN | Akinari Kawazura | 6 | 0 | 1 | 0 | 1+1 | 0 | 3 | 0 |
| 29 | FW | (Brazil) BRA | Naldinho | 9 | 0 | 1+8 | 0 | 0 | 0 | 0 | 0 |
| 31 | MF | (Japan) JPN | Haruki Yoshida | 7 | 1 | 0+1 | 0 | 2 | 0 | 2+2 | 1 |
| 32 | FW | (Japan) JPN | Koki Toyoda | 2 | 0 | 0 | 0 | 1 | 0 | 0+1 | 0 |
| 33 | MF | (Japan) JPN | Hidemasa Koda | 12 | 0 | 0+7 | 0 | 0 | 0 | 2+3 | 0 |
| 34 | MF | (Japan) JPN | Takuya Uchida | 23 | 0 | 4+15 | 0 | 3 | 0 | 1 | 0 |
| 35 | MF | (Japan) JPN | Seiryo Usui | 2 | 0 | 0 | 0 | 2 | 0 | 0 | 0 |
| 42 | FW | (Japan) JPN | Ryoga Kida | 2 | 0 | 0 | 0 | 2 | 0 | 0 | 0 |
| 45 | FW | (Japan) JPN | Kensuke Nagai | 15 | 4 | 11+2 | 4 | 0 | 0 | 1+1 | 0 |
| 46 | MF | (Japan) JPN | Ryotaro Ishida | 15 | 0 | 1+7 | 0 | 2 | 0 | 1+4 | 0 |
Players away on loan:
| 7 | MF | (Japan) JPN | Hiroyuki Abe | 25 | 4 | 1+15 | 1 | 3 | 2 | 4+2 | 1 |
| 26 | DF | (Japan) JPN | Shumpei Naruse | 2 | 0 | 0 | 0 | 0 | 0 | 1+1 | 0 |
| 28 | DF | (Japan) JPN | Akira Yoshida | 2 | 0 | 0 | 0 | 2 | 0 | 0 | 0 |
Players who left Nagoya Grampus during the season:
| 19 | MF | (Japan) JPN | Manabu Saitō | 10 | 1 | 0+3 | 0 | 1 | 0 | 2+4 | 1 |
| 44 | MF | (Japan) JPN | Mu Kanazaki | 13 | 1 | 2+5 | 0 | 1 | 0 | 3+2 | 1 |

=== Goal Scorers ===
| Place | Position | Nation | Number | Name | J1 League | Emperor's Cup | J.League Cup | Total |
|---|---|---|---|---|---|---|---|---|
| 1 | MF | (Brazil) | 10 | Mateus | 8 | 2 | 3 | 5 |
| 2 | FW | (Japan) | 45 | Kensuke Nagai | 4 | 0 | 0 | 4 |
| 2 | MF | (Japan) | 15 | Sho Inagaki | 2 | 0 | 2 | 4 |
| 2 | MF | (Japan) | 7 | Hiroyuki Abe | 1 | 2 | 1 | 4 |
| 5 | MF | (Japan) | 9 | Noriyoshi Sakai | 2 | 0 | 1 | 3 |
| 5 | MF | (Japan) | 11 | Yuki Soma | 2 | 0 | 1 | 3 |
| 5 | | | | Own goal | 3 | 0 | 0 | 3 |
| 8 | DF | (Japan) | 4 | Shinnosuke Nakatani | 2 | 0 | 0 | 2 |
| 8 | MF | (Japan) | 14 | Keiya Sento | 2 | 0 | 0 | 2 |
| 8 | DF | (Japan) | 17 | Ryoya Morishita | 1 | 0 | 1 | 2 |
| 11 | DF | (Japan) | 13 | Haruya Fujii | 1 | 0 | 0 | 1 |
| 11 | MF | (Brazil) | 16 | Léo Silva | 1 | 0 | 0 | 1 |
| 11 | MF | (Japan) | 19 | Takuya Shigehiro | 1 | 0 | 0 | 1 |
| 11 | FW | (Japan) | 8 | Yoichiro Kakitani | 0 | 0 | 1 | 0 |
| 11 | MF | (Japan) | 44 | Mu Kanazaki | 0 | 0 | 1 | 0 |
| 11 | MF | (Japan) | 31 | Haruki Yoshida | 0 | 0 | 1 | 0 |
| 11 | DF | (Japan) | 3 | Yuichi Maruyama | 0 | 0 | 1 | 0 |
| 11 | MF | (Japan) | 19 | Manabu Saitō | 0 | 0 | 1 | 0 |
| | | | | TOTALS | 30 | 4 | 14 | 48 |

=== Clean sheets ===
| Place | Position | Nation | Number | Name | J1 League | Emperor's Cup | J.League Cup | Total |
|---|---|---|---|---|---|---|---|---|
| 1 | GK | (Australia) | 1 | Mitchell Langerak | 13 | 0 | 3 | 16 |
| 2 | GK | (Japan) | 21 | Yohei Takeda | 0 | 2 | 2 | 4 |
| TOTALS | | | | | 13 | 2 | 5 | 20 |

=== Disciplinary record ===
| Number | Nation | Position | Name | J1 League | | Emperor's Cup | | J.League Cup | | Total | |
| Number | Nation | Position | Name | Yellow card | Red card | Yellow card | Red card | Yellow card | Red card | Yellow card | Red card |
| 1 | (Australia) | GK | Mitchell Langerak | 0 | 0 | 0 | 0 | 1 | 0 | 1 | 0 |
| 2 | (Brazil) | DF | Tiago Pagnussat | 1 | 1 | 0 | 0 | 0 | 0 | 1 | 1 |
| 4 | (Japan) | DF | Shinnosuke Nakatani | 3 | 0 | 0 | 0 | 0 | 0 | 3 | 0 |
| 6 | (Japan) | DF | Kazuya Miyahara | 0 | 0 | 0 | 0 | 1 | 1 | 1 | 1 |
| 8 | (Japan) | MF | Yoichiro Kakitani | 0 | 0 | 0 | 0 | 1 | 0 | 1 | 0 |
| 9 | (Japan) | MF | Noriyoshi Sakai | 1 | 0 | 0 | 0 | 0 | 0 | 1 | 0 |
| 10 | (Brazil) | MF | Mateus | 4 | 0 | 0 | 0 | 0 | 0 | 4 | 0 |
| 11 | (Japan) | MF | Yuki Soma | 4 | 0 | 0 | 0 | 0 | 0 | 4 | 0 |
| 14 | (Japan) | MF | Keiya Sento | 1 | 0 | 1 | 0 | 0 | 0 | 2 | 0 |
| 15 | (Japan) | MF | Sho Inagaki | 2 | 0 | 1 | 0 | 0 | 0 | 3 | 0 |
| 16 | (Brazil) | MF | Léo Silva | 1 | 0 | 1 | 0 | 0 | 0 | 2 | 0 |
| 17 | (Japan) | DF | Ryoya Morishita | 5 | 0 | 1 | 0 | 0 | 0 | 6 | 0 |
| 19 | (Japan) | MF | Takuya Shigehiro | 1 | 0 | 0 | 0 | 0 | 0 | 1 | 0 |
| 23 | (Japan) | DF | Yutaka Yoshida | 1 | 1 | 0 | 0 | 1 | 0 | 2 | 1 |
| 34 | (Japan) | MF | Takuya Uchida | 2 | 0 | 0 | 0 | 0 | 0 | 2 | 0 |
| 45 | (Japan) | FW | Kensuke Nagai | 1 | 0 | 0 | 0 | 0 | 0 | 1 | 0 |
| 46 | (Japan) | MF | Ryotaro Ishida | 1 | 0 | 0 | 0 | 0 | 0 | 1 | 0 |
Players away on loan:
Players who left Nagoya Grampus during the season:
| 44 | (Japan) | MF | Mu Kanazaki | 0 | 0 | 0 | 0 | 1 | 0 | 1 | 0 |
| | | | TOTALS | 28 | 2 | 4 | 0 | 6 | 1 | 38 | 3 |
