= 2019 J1 League =

27th season of J1 League

Meiji Yasuda J1 League
- Season: 2019
- Champions: Yokohama F. Marinos; 4th J. League title 6th Japanese title
- Relegated: Matsumoto Yamaga; Júbilo Iwata
- AFC Champions League: Yokohama F. Marinos; FC Tokyo; Kashima Antlers; Vissel Kobe
- Matches: 306
- Goals: 797 (2.6 per match)
- Top goalscorer: Marcos Júnior; Teruhito Nakagawa (15 goals each)
- Highest attendance: 63,854; Yokohama F. Marinos v FC Tokyo (07 December 2019)
- Lowest attendance: 6,491; Sanfrecce Hiroshima v Shonan Bellmare (14 June 2019)
- Total attendance: 6,349,681
- Average attendance: 20,751

The 2019 J1 League, also known as the 2019 Meiji Yasuda J1 League (Japanese: 2019 明治安田生命J1リーグ, Hepburn: 2019 Meiji Yasuda Seimei J1 Rīgu) for sponsorship reasons, was the 27th season of the J1 League – the top Japanese professional league for association football clubs since its establishment in 1992. This was fifth season of J1 League as renamed from J. League Division 1.

Kawasaki Frontale were the defending champions.

== Clubs ==
Locations of the 2019 J1 League teams
Greater Tokyo Area J1 League teams
2020 J1 League teams in Keihanshin

A total of 18 clubs contested the league. There were only two changes from 2018, since Kashiwa Reysol and V-Varen Nagasaki were relegated to the 2019 J2 League while Júbilo Iwata defeated Tokyo Verdy in the promotion/relegation play-off. 2018 J2 League champions Matsumoto Yamaga returned to the J1 League after three seasons of absence, while Oita Trinita returned to the top tier after six seasons.

Club	Location	Stadium	Capacity	Last season
Hokkaido Consadole Sapporo	Hokkaido	Sapporo Dome; Sapporo Atsubetsu Stadium	41,484; 20,861	J1 (4th)
Vegalta Sendai	Miyagi Prefecture	Yurtec Stadium Sendai	19,694	J1 (11th)
Kashima Antlers	Ibaraki Prefecture	Kashima Soccer Stadium	40,728	J1 (3rd)
Urawa Red Diamonds	Saitama Prefecture	Saitama Stadium 2002	63,700	J1 (5th)
FC Tokyo	Tokyo	Ajinomoto Stadium	49,970	J1 (6th)
Kawasaki Frontale	Kanagawa Prefecture	Todoroki Athletics Stadium	26,232	J1 (champions)
Yokohama F. Marinos	Kanagawa Prefecture	Nissan Stadium; Nippatsu Mitsuzawa Stadium	72,327; 15,046	J1 (12th)
Shonan Bellmare	Kanagawa Prefecture	Shonan BMW Stadium Hiratsuka	18,500	J1 (13th)
Shimizu S-Pulse	Shizuoka Prefecture	IAI Stadium Nihondaira	20,339	J1 (8th)
Júbilo Iwata	Shizuoka Prefecture	Yamaha Stadium	15,165	J1 (16th)
Nagoya Grampus	Aichi Prefecture	Paloma Mizuho Stadium; Toyota Stadium	27,001; 45,000	J1 (15th)
Gamba Osaka	Osaka Prefecture	Panasonic Stadium Suita	39,694	J1 (9th)
Cerezo Osaka	Osaka Prefecture	Yanmar Stadium Nagai; Kincho Stadium	47,853; 18,007	J1 (7th)
Vissel Kobe	Hyōgo Prefecture	Noevir Stadium Kobe	30,134	J1 (10th)
Sanfrecce Hiroshima	Hiroshima Prefecture	Edition Stadium Hiroshima	36,894	J1 (2nd)
Sagan Tosu	Saga Prefecture	Best Amenity Stadium	24,130	J1 (14th)
Matsumoto Yamaga	Nagano Prefecture	Sunpro Alwin	20,396	J2 (champions)
Oita Trinita	Ōita Prefecture	Ōita Bank Dome	31,997	J2 (2nd)

=== Personnel and kits ===
Club	Manager	Captain	Kit manufacturer	Front shirt sponsor
Cerezo Osaka	(Spain) Miguel Ángel Lotina	(Japan) Hiroshi Kiyotake	Puma	Yanmar
FC Tokyo	(Japan) Kenta Hasegawa	(Japan) Keigo Higashi	Umbro	XFLAG
Gamba Osaka	(Japan) Tsuneyasu Miyamoto	(Japan) Genta Miura	Umbro	Panasonic
Hokkaido Consadole Sapporo	(Serbia) Mihailo Petrović	(Japan) Hiroki Miyazawa	Kappa	Ishiya
Júbilo Iwata	(Spain) Fernando Jubero	(Japan) Nagisa Sakurauchi	Puma	Yamaha
Kashima Antlers	(Japan) Go Oiwa	(Japan) Atsuto Uchida	Nike	Lixil
Kawasaki Frontale	(Japan) Toru Oniki	(Japan) Yu Kobayashi	Puma	Fujitsu
Matsumoto Yamaga	(Japan) Yasuharu Sorimachi	(Japan) Yuya Hashiuchi	Adidas	Epson
Nagoya Grampus	(Italy) Massimo Ficcadenti	(Japan) Yuichi Maruyama	Mizuno	Toyota
Oita Trinita	(Japan) Tomohiro Katanosaka	(Japan) Yoshinori Suzuki	Puma	Daihatsu Kyushu
Sagan Tosu	(South Korea) Kim Myung-hwi	(Japan) Akito Fukuta	New Balance	DHC
Sanfrecce Hiroshima	(Japan) Hiroshi Jofuku	(Japan) Toshihiro Aoyama	Nike	EDION
Shimizu S-Pulse	(Japan) Yoshiyuki Shinoda	(Japan) Ryo Takeuchi	Puma	Suzuyo
Shonan Bellmare	(Japan) Bin Ukishima	(Japan) Kazunari Ono	Penalty	Meldia
Urawa Red Diamonds	(Japan) Tsuyoshi Otsuki	(Japan) Yōsuke Kashiwagi	Nike	Polus
Vegalta Sendai	(Japan) Susumu Watanabe	(Japan) Kazuki Oiwa	Adidas	Iris Ohyama
Vissel Kobe	(Germany) Thorsten Fink	(Spain) Andrés Iniesta	Asics	Rakuten
Yokohama F. Marinos	(Australia) Ange Postecoglou	(Japan) Takuya Kida	Adidas	Nissan

=== Managerial changes ===
Team	Outgoing manager	Manner of departure	Date of vacancy	Incoming manager	Date of appointment
Vissel Kobe	(Spain) Juan Manuel Lillo	Mutual consent	17 April 2019	(Japan) Takayuki Yoshida	17 April 2019
Sagan Tosu	(Spain) Lluís Carreras	Mutual consent	5 May 2019	(South Korea) Kim Myung-hwi	7 May 2019
Shimizu S-Pulse	(Sweden) Jan Jönsson	Mutual consent	12 May 2019	(Japan) Yoshiyuki Shinoda	14 May 2019
Urawa Red Diamonds	(Brazil) Oswaldo de Oliveira	Mutual consent	28 May 2019	(Japan) Tsuyoshi Otsuki	28 May 2019
Vissel Kobe	(Japan) Takayuki Yoshida	Mutual consent	8 June 2019	(Germany) Thorsten Fink	8 June 2019
Júbilo Iwata	(Japan) Hiroshi Nanami	Mutual consent	30 June 2019	(Japan) Hideto Suzuki	1 July 2019
Júbilo Iwata	(Japan) Hideto Suzuki	Resigned for health reasons	15 August 2019	(Spain) Fernando Jubero	20 August 2019
Nagoya Grampus	(Japan) Yahiro Kazama	Sacked	23 September 2019	(Italy) Massimo Ficcadenti	23 September 2019
Shonan Bellmare	(South Korea) Cho Kwi-jae	Resigned from mid-term	8 October 2019	(Japan) Bin Ukishima	10 October 2019

=== Foreign players ===
As of 2019 season, there are no more restrictions on a number of signed foreign players, but clubs can only register up to five foreign players for a single match-day squad. Players from J.League partner nations (Thailand, Vietnam, Myanmar, Malaysia, Cambodia, Singapore, Indonesia and Qatar) are exempt from these restrictions.

- Players marked in **bold** indicate the players that were registered during the mid-season transfer window.
- Players marked in ITALICS indicate the players that left their respective clubs during the mid-season transfer window.

Club	Player 1	Player 2	Player 3	Player 4	Player 5	Player 6	Player 7	Player 8	Former players
Cerezo Osaka	(Argentina) Leandro Desábato	(Australia) Pierce Waring	(Brazil) Bruno Mendes	(Brazil) Souza	(Croatia) Matej Jonjić	(South Korea) Kim Jin-hyeon			
FC Tokyo	(Brazil) Arthur Silva	(Brazil) Diego Oliveira	(Brazil) Jael	(South Korea) Na Sang-ho	(South Korea) **Oh Jae-suk**	(South Korea) Yu In-soo	(Thailand) Nattawut Suksum		(South Korea) Jang Hyun-soo
Gamba Osaka	(Brazil) Ademilson	(Brazil) **Patric**	(South Korea) Kim Young-gwon	(Spain) David Concha	(Spain) **Markel Susaeta**				(South Korea) Hwang Ui-jo (South Korea) Oh Jae-suk
Hokkaido Consadole Sapporo	(Brazil) Anderson Lopes	(Brazil) Lucas Fernandes	(England) Jay Bothroyd	(South Korea) Gu Sung-yun	(South Korea) Kim Min-tae	(Thailand) Chanathip Songkrasin			
Júbilo Iwata	(Brazil) Adaílton	(Brazil) **Fábio**	(Brazil) **Lukian**	(Netherlands) **Lorenzo Ebecilio**	(Poland) Krzysztof Kamiński	(Uzbekistan) Fozil Musaev			(Luxembourg) Gerson Rodrigues (Turkey) Eren Albayrak
Kashima Antlers	(Brazil) Bueno	(Brazil) Leandro	(Brazil) Léo Silva	(Brazil) Serginho	(South Korea) Jung Seung-hyun	(South Korea) Kwoun Sun-tae			
Kawasaki Frontale	(Brazil) Jesiel	(Brazil) Leandro Damião	(Brazil) Maguinho	(South Korea) Jung Sung-ryong					(Brazil) Caio César
Matsumoto Yamaga	(Brazil) Eduardo	(Brazil) Paulinho	(Brazil) Serginho	(Guinea-Bissau) **Isma**	(South Korea) Goh Dong-min	(South Korea) Jo Jin-woo			(Brazil) Leandro Pereira
Nagoya Grampus	(Australia) Mitchell Langerak	(Brazil) Eduardo Neto	(Brazil) Gabriel Xavier	(Brazil) Jô	(Brazil) João Schmidt				(Brazil) Mateus
Oita Trinita	(South Korea) Mun Kyung-gun	(Thailand) Thitipan Puangchan							
Sagan Tosu	(Brazil) **Tiago Alves**	(South Korea) An Yong-woo	(South Korea) Cho Dong-geon	(South Korea) Kim Min-ho	(South Korea) **Park Jeong-su**	(Spain) Isaac Cuenca			(Colombia) Víctor Ibarbo (Croatia) Karlo Bručić (Croatia) Nino Galović (Spain) Fernando Torres
Sanfrecce Hiroshima	(Brazil) Douglas Vieira	(Brazil) **Leandro Pereira**	(Brazil) Rhayner	(Sweden) Emil Salomonsson					(Brazil) Patric (Kosovo) Besart Berisha
Shimizu S-Pulse	(Brazil) Douglas	(Brazil) Elsinho	(Brazil) **Junior Dutra**	(Brazil) Renato Augusto	(North Korea) Jong Tae-se	(South Korea) Hwang Seok-ho			(Brazil) Wanderson
Shonan Bellmare	(Brazil) **Crislan**	(Brazil) Freire	(Turkey) **Ömer Tokaç**						(Brazil) Lelêu (Brazil) Rafael Dumas
Urawa Red Diamonds	(Brazil) Ewerton	(Brazil) Fabrício	(Brazil) Maurício Antônio	(Curaçao) Quenten Martinus					(Australia) Andrew Nabbout
Vegalta Sendai	(Brazil) **Diogo Acosta**	(Brazil) Ramon Lopes	(Mozambique) Simão Mate Junior	(North Korea) Ryang Yong-gi	(Poland) **Jakub Słowik**	(South Korea) Kim Jung-ya			
Vissel Kobe	(Belgium) **Thomas Vermaelen**	(Brazil) Dankler	(Brazil) Wellington	(Germany) Lukas Podolski	(Lebanon) **Joan Oumari**	(Spain) Andrés Iniesta	(Spain) David Villa	(Spain) Sergi Samper	(South Korea) Kim Seung-gyu
Yokohama F. Marinos	(Brazil) Edigar Junio	(Brazil) **Erik**	(Brazil) Marcos Júnior	(Brazil) **Mateus**	(Brazil) Thiago Martins	(Serbia) Dušan Cvetinović	(South Korea) Park Il-gyu	(Thailand) Theerathon Bunmathan	(Russia) Ippey Shinozuka

== League table ==
Pos	Team	Pld	W	D	L	GF	GA	GD	Pts	Qualification or relegation
1	Yokohama F. Marinos (C)	34	22	4	8	68	38	+30	70	Qualification for the Champions League group stage
2	FC Tokyo	34	19	7	8	46	29	+17	64	Qualification for the Champions League play-off round
3	Kashima Antlers	34	18	9	7	54	30	+24	63	Qualification for the Champions League play-off round
4	Kawasaki Frontale	34	16	12	6	57	34	+23	60	
5	Cerezo Osaka	34	18	5	11	39	25	+14	59	
6	Sanfrecce Hiroshima	34	15	10	9	45	29	+16	55	
7	Gamba Osaka	34	12	11	11	54	48	+6	47	
8	Vissel Kobe	34	14	5	15	61	59	+2	47	Qualification for the Champions League group stage (Note: Vissel Kobe qualified for the 2020 AFC Champions League group stage as 2019 Emperor's Cup winners.)
9	Oita Trinita	34	12	11	11	35	35	0	47	
10	Hokkaido Consadole Sapporo	34	13	7	14	54	49	+5	46	
11	Vegalta Sendai	34	12	5	17	38	45	−7	41	
12	Shimizu S-Pulse	34	11	6	17	45	69	−24	39	
13	Nagoya Grampus	34	9	10	15	45	50	−5	37	
14	Urawa Red Diamonds	34	9	10	15	34	50	−16	37	
15	Sagan Tosu	34	10	6	18	32	53	−21	36	
16	Shonan Bellmare (O)	34	10	6	18	40	63	−23	36	Qualification for the Relegation play-off
17	Matsumoto Yamaga (R)	34	6	13	15	21	40	−19	31	Relegation to J2 League
18	Júbilo Iwata (R)	34	8	7	19	29	51	−22	31	Relegation to J2 League

Source: Meiji Yasuda J1 League
Rules for classification: 1) Points; 2) Goal difference; 3) Goals scored.
(C) Champions; (O) Play-off winners; (R) Relegated

== Positions by round ==
Team ╲ Round	1	2	3	4	5	6	7	8	9	10	11	12	13	14	15	16	17	18	19	20	21	22	23	24	25	26	27	28	29	30	31	32	33	34
Yokohama F. Marinos	3	2	3	7	8	5	5	9	8	6	7	6	5	3	4	2	3	2	2	2	3	4	5	3	3	3	3	3	3	3	2	1	1	1
FC Tokyo	10	3	2	1	2	2	2	1	1	1	1	1	1	1	1	1	1	1	1	1	1	1	1	1	1	1	1	2	2	2	1	2	2	2
Kashima Antlers	15	14	8	5	7	6	6	5	9	8	5	5	6	5	3	4	5	4	4	4	4	2	2	2	2	2	2	1	1	1	3	3	3	3
Kawasaki Frontale	10	11	13	13	10	10	8	7	6	4	4	4	2	2	2	3	2	3	3	3	2	3	3	4	5	4	5	4	6	4	4	4	4	4
Cerezo Osaka	5	10	14	14	12	11	13	14	13	11	10	11	9	9	10	9	7	7	6	6	7	8	7	6	6	6	4	6	5	6	5	5	5	5
Sanfrecce Hiroshima	6	11	7	4	3	1	1	2	3	7	8	8	7	8	8	8	9	8	7	7	5	5	4	5	4	5	6	5	4	4	6	6	6	6
Gamba Osaka	14	5	11	9	11	14	15	15	15	15	16	14	16	15	17	14	13	14	11	11	12	13	13	14	14	12	14	12	9	9	9	9	9	7
Vissel Kobe	16	9	5	6	4	7	10	11	12	13	13	15	13	13	11	13	11	13	15	15	15	15	15	12	12	9	9	9	10	10	10	10	10	8
Oita Trinita	4	8	6	3	6	4	3	4	4	3	3	3	4	6	6	6	4	5	5	5	6	6	8	8	8	8	8	8	7	8	7	7	7	9
Hokkaido Consadole Sapporo	17	7	4	10	13	15	11	8	7	5	6	7	8	7	7	5	6	6	8	8	8	7	6	7	7	7	7	7	8	7	8	8	6	10
Vegalta Sendai	10	15	16	18	18	16	17	17	16	17	14	16	18	16	13	11	10	11	13	13	12	14	14	15	15	14	12	14	11	12	11	11	11	11
Shimizu S-Pulse	6	16	17	17	17	18	16	13	14	16	17	18	17	18	15	12	14	12	14	14	14	12	12	13	13	10	10	11	13	13	15	15	15	12
Nagoya Grampus	1	1	1	2	1	3	4	3	2	2	2	2	3	4	5	7	8	9	9	10	10	9	9	9	9	11	11	13	14	14	12	12	12	13
Urawa Red Diamonds	10	17	10	8	9	9	7	6	5	9	9	10	11	10	9	10	12	10	10	9	9	10	10	11	11	15	13	10	12	9	13	13	13	14
Sagan Tosu	18	18	18	15	15	17	18	18	18	18	18	17	14	17	18	18	16	16	18	18	17	16	16	16	16	16	16	16	15	15	14	14	14	15
Shonan Bellmare	2	6	12	11	5	8	9	12	10	10	11	9	10	11	12	15	15	15	12	12	11	11	11	10	10	13	15	15	16	16	16	16	16	16
Matsumoto Yamaga	6	4	9	12	14	12	12	10	11	12	12	13	12	12	14	16	17	17	17	16	16	17	17	17	17	17	17	17	17	17	17	17	18	17
Júbilo Iwata	6	11	15	16	16	13	14	16	17	14	15	12	15	14	16	17	18	18	16	17	18	18	18	18	18	18	18	18	18	18	18	18	17	18

Leader and qualification to AFC Champions League Group stage
Qualification to AFC Champions League qualifying play-off
Qualification to Relegation play-off
Relegation to J2 League

Source: Meiji Yasuda J1 League

== Promotion–relegation playoffs ==
In the first two rounds of the 2019 J.League J1/J2 Play-Offs (2019 J1参入プレーオフ), if the score is tied after 90 minutes, no extra time is played and the winner is the team with the best J2 League ranking. In the final match against the J1 team, if the score is tied after 90 minutes, no extra time is played and the J1 team wins.

1st Round; 01 Dec
J2 (4)	Tokushima Vortis	1
J2 (5)	Ventforet Kofu	1
J2 (3)	Omiya Ardija	0
J2 (6)	Montedio Yamagata	2

2nd Round; 08 Dec
J2 (4)	Tokushima Vortis	1
J2 (6)	Montedio Yamagata	0

Final; 14 Dec
J1 (16)	Shonan Bellmare	1
J2 (4)	Tokushima Vortis	1

Shonan Bellmare remains in J1 League.
Tokushima Vortis remains in J2 League.

== Results table ==
Home \ Away	ANT	BEL	CER	CON	FMA	FRO	GAM	GRA	JUB	RED	SAG	SFR	SSP	TOK	TRI	VEG	VIS	YAM
Kashima Antlers	—	1–0	2–0	1–1	2–1	0–2	2–2	2–1	2–0	1–0	2–1	2–2	3–0	2–0	1–2	1–0	1–3	5–0
Shonan Bellmare	3–2	—	0–2	2–0	1–2	0–5	0–3	1–1	0–2	1–1	2–3	1–0	0–6	2–3	0–1	2–1	3–1	1–1
Cerezo Osaka	0–1	1–0	—	0–1	3–0	2–1	3–1	3–0	2–0	1–2	1–2	0–1	2–1	1–0	0–0	0–0	1–0	1–1
Hokkaido Consadole Sapporo	1–3	5–2	0–1	—	3–0	1–2	0–0	3–0	1–2	1–1	3–1	1–0	5–2	1–1	1–2	1–3	2–1	1–1
Yokohama F. Marinos	2–1	3–1	1–2	4–2	—	2–2	3–1	1–1	4–0	3–1	0–0	3–0	0–1	3–0	1–0	2–1	4–1	1–0
Kawasaki Frontale	1–1	2–0	1–1	1–1	1–4	—	0–1	1–1	2–0	1–1	0–0	2–1	2–2	0–0	3–1	3–1	1–2	0–0
Gamba Osaka	1–1	1–0	1–0	5–0	2–3	2–2	—	2–3	1–1	0–1	1–0	1–1	1–0	0–0	1–1	2–0	3–4	4–1
Nagoya Grampus	0–1	0–2	2–0	4–0	1–5	3–0	2–2	—	1–0	2–0	0–0	1–0	1–2	1–2	1–1	0–2	3–0	0–1
Júbilo Iwata	1–1	2–3	0–2	1–2	0–2	1–3	0–0	2–1	—	1–3	2–2	0–2	1–2	0–1	1–2	2–0	1–1	1–1
Urawa Red Diamonds	1–1	2–3	1–2	0–2	0–3	0–2	2–3	2–2	0–1	—	2–1	0–4	2–1	1–1	0–1	1–0	1–0	1–2
Sagan Tosu	1–0	0–2	0–1	0–2	1–2	0–1	3–1	0–4	1–0	3–3	—	0–2	4–2	2–1	2–2	2–1	1–6	1–0
Sanfrecce Hiroshima	0–0	2–0	1–1	1–0	0–1	3–2	3–0	1–1	0–0	1–1	0–1	—	1–1	0–1	0–0	1–0	6–2	1–0
Shimizu S-Pulse	0–4	1–3	1–0	0–8	3–2	0–4	2–4	3–2	1–2	0–2	1–0	1–2	—	0–2	1–1	4–3	2–1	1–0
FC Tokyo	3–1	1–1	3–0	2–0	4–2	0–3	3–1	1–0	1–0	1–1	2–0	0–1	2–1	—	3–1	1–0	0–1	2–0
Oita Trinita	0–1	2–1	0–2	2–1	2–0	0–1	2–1	1–1	1–2	2–0	2–0	0–1	1–1	0–2	—	2–0	1–1	0–1
Vegalta Sendai	0–4	1–1	0–2	2–1	1–1	2–2	2–1	3–1	2–1	0–0	3–0	2–1	2–0	2–0	2–0	—	1–3	0–1
Vissel Kobe	0–1	4–1	1–0	2–3	0–2	1–2	2–2	5–3	4–1	3–0	1–0	2–4	1–1	1–3	2–2	2–0	—	2–1
Matsumoto Yamaga	1–1	1–1	0–2	0–0	0–1	0–2	1–3	1–1	0–1	0–1	1–0	2–2	1–1	0–0	0–0	0–1	2–1	—

Source: 2019 J1 League
Legend: Blue = home team win; Yellow = draw; Red = away team win.

== Season statistics ==
=== Top scorers ===
Rank	Player	Club	Goals
1	(Brazil) Marcos Júnior	Yokohama F. Marinos	15
1	(Japan) Teruhito Nakagawa	Yokohama F. Marinos	15
3	(Brazil) Diego Oliveira	FC Tokyo	14
3	(Brazil) Douglas	Shimizu S-Pulse	14
5	(Japan) Musashi Suzuki	Hokkaido Consadole Sapporo	13
5	(Japan) Yu Kobayashi	Kawasaki Frontale	13
5	(Spain) David Villa	Vissel Kobe	13
8	(Brazil) Serginho	Kashima Antlers	12
8	(Japan) Shinzo Koroki	Urawa Red Diamonds	12
10	(Brazil) Edigar Junio	Yokohama F. Marinos	11

=== Hat-tricks ===
Player	Club	Against	Result	Date
(Brazil) Anderson Lopes^{4}	Hokkaido Consadole Sapporo	Shimizu S-Pulse	5–2 (H)	9 March 2019
(England) Jay Bothroyd	Hokkaido Consadole Sapporo	Shimizu S-Pulse	8–0 (A)	17 August 2019
(Germany) Lukas Podolski	Vissel Kobe	Júbilo Iwata	4–1 (H)	7 December 2019

Note

^{4} Player scored 4 goals

== Attendances ==
Pos	Team	Total	High	Low	Average	Change
1	Urawa Red Diamonds	581,135	54,599	19,698	34,184	−3.7%
2	FC Tokyo	536,187	42,401	22,302	31,540	+19.3%
3	Gamba Osaka	471,034	37,334	17,727	27,708	+18.0%
4	Nagoya Grampus	469,397	42,975	14,651	27,612	+12.0%
5	Yokohama F. Marinos	459,168	63,854	11,186	27,010	+24.0%
6	Kawasaki Frontale	395,619	25,789	19,556	23,272	+0.2%
7	Cerezo Osaka	365,810	42,221	12,044	21,518	+14.4%
8	Vissel Kobe	365,349	25,929	17,708	21,491	−0.6%
9	Kashima Antlers	349,678	34,312	10,208	20,569	+5.8%
10	Hokkaido Consadole Sapporo	319,053	35,531	6,836	18,768	+3.0%
11	Matsumoto Yamaga	296,079	19,744	14,078	17,416	+31.1%^{†}
12	Oita Trinita	260,893	28,574	9,031	15,347	+72.3%^{†}
13	Júbilo Iwata	259,709	31,144	9,416	15,277	−1.3%
14	Sagan Tosu	255,845	23,055	8,698	15,050	+0.3%
15	Shimizu S-Pulse	255,735	18,246	11,028	15,043	+0.3%
16	Vegalta Sendai	254,503	19,503	10,931	14,971	−2.8%
17	Sanfrecce Hiroshima	236,063	29,666	6,491	13,886	−3.2%
18	Shonan Bellmare	218,424	14,246	9,290	12,848	+6.0%
	League total	6,349,681	54,599	6,491	20,751	+8.8%

Updated to games played on 7 December 2019
Source: J. League Data
Notes:
^{†} Promoted from J2.。

== Awards ==
Award	Winner	Club
Manager of the Year	(Japan) Tomohiro Katanosaka	Oita Trinita
Most Valuable Player	(Japan) Teruhito Nakagawa	Yokohama F. Marinos
Rookie of the Year	(Japan) Ao Tanaka	Kawasaki Frontale
Top Scorer	(Brazil) Marcos Júnior (Japan) Teruhito Nakagawa	Yokohama F. Marinos

J.League Best XI
Goalkeeper	(Japan) Akihiro Hayashi (FC Tokyo)			
Defence	(Japan) Sei Muroya (FC Tokyo)		(Brazil) Thiago Martins (Yokohama F. Marinos)	(Japan) Masato Morishige (FC Tokyo)
Midfield	(Japan) Takuya Kida (Yokohama F. Marinos)	(Japan) Kento Hashimoto (FC Tokyo)	(Spain) Andrés Iniesta (Vissel Kobe)	(Japan) Teruhito Nakagawa (Yokohama F. Marinos)
Attack	(Brazil) Marcos Júnior (Yokohama F. Marinos)		(Brazil) Diego Oliveira (FC Tokyo)	(Japan) Kensuke Nagai (FC Tokyo)

2019 J1 League Best XI

== See also ==
- List of J1 League football transfers summer 2019
