= 2017 Kashima Antlers season =

Kashima Antlers
2017 season
- Manager: Masatada Ishii; Go Oiwa
- Stadium: Kashima Soccer Stadium
- J1 League: 2nd
- Emperor's Cup: Quarter-final
- League Cup: Quarter-final
- Super Cup: Winners
- AFC Champions League: Round of 16
- Top goalscorer: League: Mu Kanazaki (12); All: Mu Kanazaki (20)
Home colours	Away colours

The 2017 season was Kashima Antlers' 25th consecutive season in the J1 League, the top-division of professional football in Japan. In addition to the league campaign, the club also competed in the Emperor's Cup, League Cup, Super Cup, and AFC Champions League.

== Squad ==
As of 2 February 2017.

Note: Flags indicate national team as defined under FIFA eligibility rules; some limited exceptions apply. Players may hold more than one non-FIFA nationality.

No.	Pos.	Nation	Player
1	GK	(South Korea) KOR	Kwoun Sun-tae
3	DF	(Japan) JPN	Gen Shoji
4	MF	(Brazil) BRA	Léo Silva
5	DF	(Japan) JPN	Naomichi Ueda
6	MF	(Japan) JPN	Ryota Nagaki
7	FW	(Brazil) BRA	Pedro Junior
8	MF	(Japan) JPN	Shoma Doi
9	FW	(Japan) JPN	Yuma Suzuki
11	FW	(Brazil) BRA	Leandro (on loan from Palmeiras)
13	MF	(Japan) JPN	Atsutaka Nakamura
14	FW	(Japan) JPN	Takeshi Kanamori
15	DF	(Japan) JPN	Yuto Misao
16	DF	(Japan) JPN	Shuto Yamamoto
17	DF	(Brazil) BRA	Bueno
18	FW	(Japan) JPN	Shuhei Akasaki

No.	Pos.	Nation	Player
20	MF	(Japan) JPN	Kento Misao
21	GK	(Japan) JPN	Hitoshi Sogahata
22	DF	(Japan) JPN	Daigo Nishi
23	DF	(Japan) JPN	Itsuki Oda
24	DF	(Japan) JPN	Yukitoshi Ito
25	MF	(Japan) JPN	Yasushi Endo
26	MF	(Japan) JPN	Kazune Kubota
27	MF	(Japan) JPN	Takahide Umebachi
28	DF	(Japan) JPN	Koki Machida
29	GK	(Japan) JPN	Shinichiro Kawamata
30	FW	(Japan) JPN	Hiroki Abe
31	GK	(Japan) JPN	Yuto Koizumi
33	MF	(Japan) JPN	Mu Kanazaki
36	MF	(Japan) JPN	Toshiya Tanaka
40	MF	(Japan) JPN	Mitsuo Ogasawara (captain)

== Competitions ==
=== J1 League ===
==== Table ====
Pos	Team	Pld	W	D	L	GF	GA	GD	Pts	Qualification or relegation
1	Kawasaki Frontale (C)	34	21	9	4	71	32	+39	72	Champions League group stage
2	Kashima Antlers	34	23	3	8	53	31	+22	72	Champions League group stage
3	Cerezo Osaka	34	19	6	9	65	43	+22	63	Champions League group stage
4	Kashiwa Reysol	34	18	8	8	49	33	+16	62	Champions League play-off round (Note: The winner of the 2017 Emperor's Cup qualified for the group stage of the 2018 AFC Champions League. Since the Emperor's Cup winner Cerezo Osaka had already qualified for the AFC Champions League, the play-off round spot was awarded to the fourth-placed team.)
5	Yokohama F. Marinos	34	17	8	9	45	36	+9	59	

Source: Meiji Yasuda J1 League
Rules for classification: 1) Points; 2) Goal difference; 3) Goals scored
(C) Champions

==== Matches ====
Match	Date	Team	Score	Team	Venue	Attendance
1	2017.02.25	Kashima Antlers	0-1	FC Tokyo	Kashima Soccer Stadium	28,240
2	2017.03.04	Ventforet Kofu	0-1	Kashima Antlers	Yamanashi Chuo Bank Stadium	13,199
3	2017.03.10	Kashima Antlers	1-0	Yokohama F. Marinos	Kashima Soccer Stadium	12,537
4	2017.03.18	Shimizu S-Pulse	2-3	Kashima Antlers	IAI Stadium Nihondaira	16,951
5	2017.04.01	Omiya Ardija	0-1	Kashima Antlers	NACK5 Stadium Omiya	11,676
6	2017.04.08	Kashima Antlers	0-1	Cerezo Osaka	Kashima Soccer Stadium	21,078
7	2017.04.16	Vegalta Sendai	1-4	Kashima Antlers	Yurtec Stadium Sendai	13,159
8	2017.04.22	Kashima Antlers	0-3	Júbilo Iwata	Kashima Soccer Stadium	18,276
9	2017.04.30	Kashima Antlers	2-1	Sagan Tosu	Kashima Soccer Stadium	18,462
10	2017.05.04	Urawa Reds	0-1	Kashima Antlers	Saitama Stadium 2002	57,447
11	2017.05.14	Kashima Antlers	1-2	Vissel Kobe	Kashima Soccer Stadium	18,626
12	2017.05.19	Kashima Antlers	0-3	Kawasaki Frontale	Kashima Soccer Stadium	10,838
14	2017.06.04	Sanfrecce Hiroshima	1-3	Kashima Antlers	Edion Stadium Hiroshima	15,781
15	2017.06.17	Kashima Antlers	3-0	Hokkaido Consadole Sapporo	Kashima Soccer Stadium	20,826
16	2017.06.25	Kashima Antlers	2-0	Albirex Niigata	Kashima Soccer Stadium	14,136
17	2017.07.02	Kashiwa Reysol	2-3	Kashima Antlers	Hitachi Kashiwa Stadium	13,945
13	2017.07.05	Gamba Osaka	0-1	Kashima Antlers	Suita City Football Stadium	18,626
18	2017.07.08	FC Tokyo	2-2	Kashima Antlers	Ajinomoto Stadium	42,979
19	2017.07.29	Kashima Antlers	3-0	Ventforet Kofu	Kashima Soccer Stadium	18,413
20	2017.08.05	Kashima Antlers	2-0	Vegalta Sendai	Kashima Soccer Stadium	17,156
21	2017.08.09	Vissel Kobe	1-2	Kashima Antlers	Noevir Stadium Kobe	19,039
22	2017.08.13	Kawasaki Frontale	3-1	Kashima Antlers	Kawasaki Todoroki Stadium	24,008
23	2017.08.19	Kashima Antlers	2-0	Shimizu S-Pulse	Kashima Soccer Stadium	16,979
24	2017.08.26	Cerezo Osaka	0-1	Kashima Antlers	Yanmar Stadium Nagai	35,516
25	2017.09.09	Kashima Antlers	1-0	Omiya Ardija	Kashima Soccer Stadium	15,719
26	2017.09.16	Albirex Niigata	2-4	Kashima Antlers	Denka Big Swan Stadium	25,453
27	2017.09.23	Kashima Antlers	2-1	Gamba Osaka	Kashima Soccer Stadium	28,565
28	2017.09.30	Sagan Tosu	1-0	Kashima Antlers	Best Amenity Stadium	18,383
29	2017.10.14	Kashima Antlers	2-0	Sanfrecce Hiroshima	Kashima Soccer Stadium	18,655
30	2017.10.21	Yokohama F. Marinos	3-2	Kashima Antlers	Nissan Stadium	29,716
31	2017.10.29	Hokkaido Consadole Sapporo	1-2	Kashima Antlers	Sapporo Dome	27,514
32	2017.11.05	Kashima Antlers	1-0	Urawa Reds	Kashima Soccer Stadium	33,356
33	2017.11.26	Kashima Antlers	0-0	Kashiwa Reysol	Kashima Soccer Stadium	36,080
34	2017.12.02	Júbilo Iwata	0-0	Kashima Antlers	Yamaha Stadium	14,696

=== Emperor's Cup ===
==== Third round ====
12 July 2017	Kashima Antlers	5–0	Montedio Yamagata	Tendō
19:00		Report		Stadium: ND Soft Stadium Yamagata

==== Fourth round ====
20 September 2017	Urawa Red Diamonds	2–4	Kashima Antlers	Kumagaya
19:00	Zlatan 59'; Muto 69'	Report	Kanazaki 7', 51' (pen.); Nakamura 74'; Doi 90'	Stadium: Kumagaya Athletic Stadium; Attendance: 10,051; Referee: H. Takayama

==== Quarter-final ====
25 October 2017	Vissel Kobe	1–1 (a.e.t.) (5 – 4 p)	Kashima Antlers	Kobe
19:00	Havenaar 90+4'	Report	Shoji 63'	Stadium: Kobe Universiade Memorial Stadium; Attendance: 5,186; Referee: H. Kimura
	Penalties
	Havenaar (penalty scored); Nílton (penalty scored); Watanabe (penalty scored); Fujita (penalty scored); Iwanami (penalty scored)		(penalty scored) Ogasawara; (penalty scored) Nishi; (penalty missed) Nakamura; (penalty scored) Misao; (penalty scored) Shoji

=== J.League Cup ===
==== Quarter-final ====
Team 1	Agg.	Team 2	1st leg	2nd leg
Vegalta Sendai	5–4	Kashima Antlers	3–1	2–3

=== Japanese Super Cup ===
18 February 2017	Kashima Antlers	3–2	Urawa Red Diamonds	Nissan Stadium, Yokohama
13:30 JST	Endo 39', 43'; Suzuki 83'	Report	Koroki 74' (pen.); Muto 75'	Attendance: 48,250; Referee: Hiroyuki Kimura

=== AFC Champions League ===
==== Group stage ====
Pos	Team	Pld	W	D	L	GF	GA	GD	Pts	Qualification	KSA	MUA	ULS	BRI
1	Kashima Antlers	6	4	0	2	13	5	+8	12	Round of 16	—	2–1	2–0	3–0
2	(Thailand) Muangthong United	6	3	2	1	7	3	+4	11	Round of 16	2–1	—	1–0	3–0
3	(South Korea) Ulsan Hyundai	6	2	1	3	9	9	0	7		0–4	0–0	—	6–0
4	(Australia) Brisbane Roar	6	1	1	4	4	16	−12	4		2–1	0–0	2–3	—

Source: AFC
Rules for classification: Group stage tiebreakers

21 February 2017	Kashima Antlers	2–0	(South Korea) Ulsan Hyundai	Kashima Soccer Stadium, Kashima
19:00 UTC+9	Kanazaki 64'; Suzuki 82'	Report		Attendance: 7,860; Referee: Mohammed Abdulla Hassan Mohamed (United Arab Emirates)

28 February 2017	Muangthong United (Thailand)	2–1	Kashima Antlers	Supachalasai National Stadium, Bangkok
19:30 UTC+7	Theerathon 12'; Xisco 90+4'	Report	Pedro Júnior 47'	Attendance: 12,569; Referee: Ilgiz Tantashev (Uzbekistan)

14 March 2017	Kashima Antlers	3–0	(Australia) Brisbane Roar	Kashima Soccer Stadium, Kashima, Ibaraki
19:00 UTC+9	Suzuki 43'; Ueda 76'; Endo 80'	Report		Attendance: 6,558; Referee: Alireza Faghani (Iran)

12 April 2017	Brisbane Roar (Australia)	2–1	Kashima Antlers	Brisbane Stadium, Brisbane
19:00 UTC+10	Maclaren 18'; Holman 49'	Report	Nagaki 79'	Attendance: 5,567; Referee: Wang Di (China)

26 April 2017	Ulsan Hyundai (South Korea)	0–4	Kashima Antlers	Ulsan Munsu Football Stadium, Ulsan
19:30 UTC+9		Report	Kanazaki 52', 67'; Pedro Júnior 54'; Léo Silva 90'	Attendance: 1,194; Referee: Aziz Asimov (Uzbekistan)

10 May 2017	Kashima Antlers	2–1	(Thailand) Muangthong United	Kashima Soccer Stadium, Kashima
19:00 UTC+9	Suzuki 19', 60'	Report	Teerasil 45'	Attendance: 7,928; Referee: Abdulrahman Al-Jassim (Qatar)

==== Round of 16 ====
23 May 2017	Guangzhou Evergrande (China)	1–0	Kashima Antlers	Tianhe Stadium, Guangzhou
20:00 UTC+8	Paulinho 75'	Report		Attendance: 39,863; Referee: Adham Makhadmeh (Jordan)

30 May 2017	Kashima Antlers	2–1	(China) Guangzhou Evergrande	Kashima Soccer Stadium, Kashima
19:00 UTC+9	Pedro Júnior 28'; Kanazaki 90+1'	Report	Paulinho 55'	Attendance: 11,388; Referee: Ravshan Irmatov (Uzbekistan)

2–2 on aggregate. Guangzhou Evergrande won on away goals.
