= Yutaka Yoshida =

Japanese footballer (born 1990)

Yutaka Yoshida 吉田豊
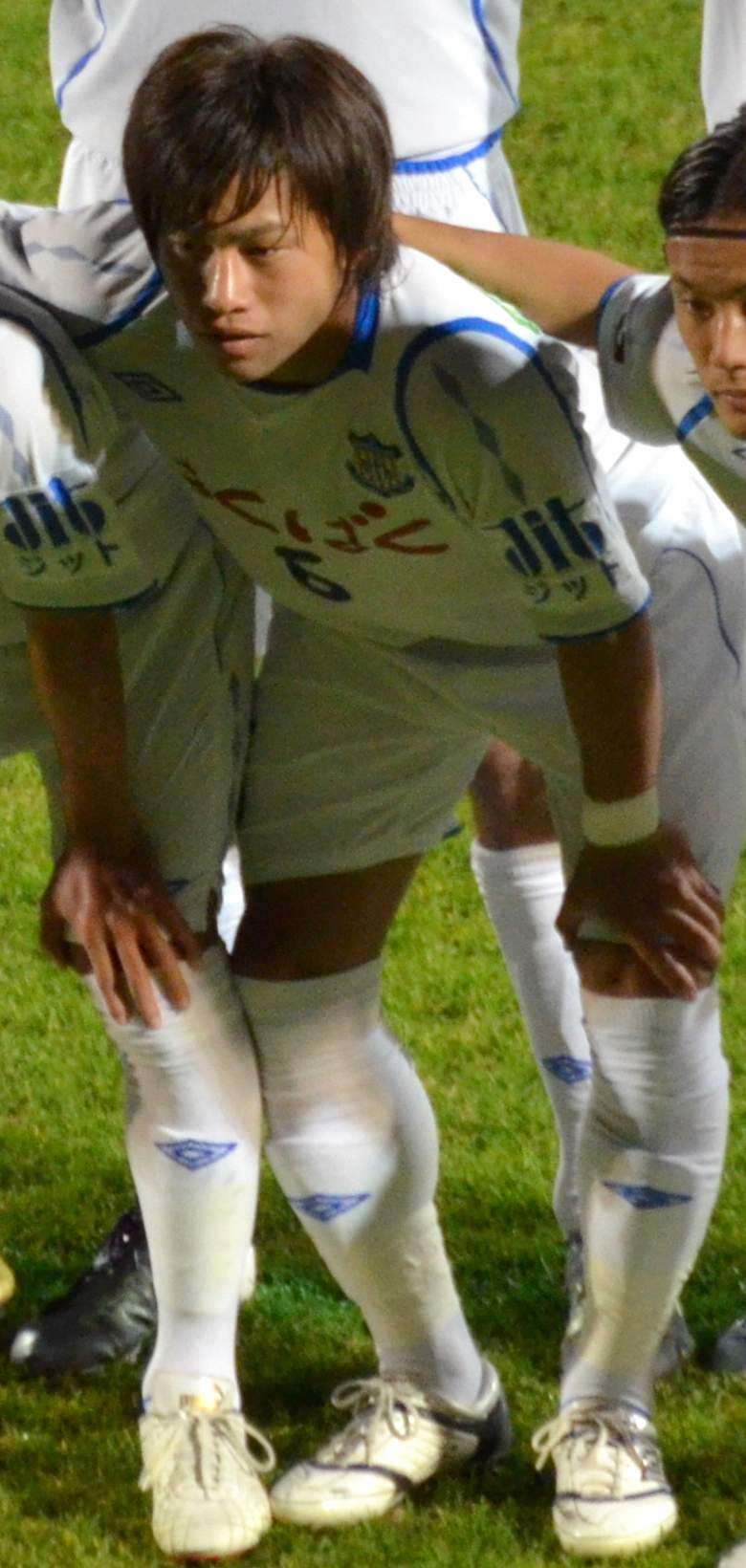

Personal information
- Full name: Yutaka Yoshida
- Date of birth: 17 February 1990 (age 36)
- Place of birth: Fujinomiya, Shizuoka, Japan
- Height: 1.68 m (5 ft 6 in)
- Position: Full back

Team information
- Current team: Shimizu S-Pulse
- Number: 28

Youth career
- 2005–2007: Shizuoka Gakuen High School

Senior career*
Years	Team	Apps	(Gls)
2008–2011	Ventforet Kofu	84	(0)
2012–2014	Shimizu S-Pulse	85	(2)
2015–2018	Sagan Tosu	117	(2)
2019–2022	Nagoya Grampus	113	(3)
2023–	Shimizu S-Pulse	102	(1)

International career
2007	Japan U-17	3	(0)
Medal record
Shimizu S-Pulse
Runner-up	J.League Cup	2012
- * Club domestic league appearances and goals as of 10 August 2026

Yutaka Yoshida (吉田 豊, Yoshida Yutaka; born 17 February 1990 in Fujinomiya, Shizuoka) is a Japanese footballer who plays as a full back for J1 League club Shimizu S-Pulse.

== National team career ==
In August 2007, Yoshida was elected Japan U-17 national team for 2007 U-17 World Cup. He played full time in all 3 matches as left side-back.

== Career statistics ==
As of 8 March 2023.

Appearances and goals by club, season and competition
Club	Season	League			Emperor's Cup		J.League Cup		Total	
Club	Season	Division	Apps	Goals	Apps	Goals	Apps	Goals	Apps	Goals
Ventforet Kofu	2008	J2 League	10	0	0	0	—		10	0
Ventforet Kofu	2009	J2 League	23	0	2	0	—		25	0
Ventforet Kofu	2010	J2 League	27	0	1	0	—		28	0
Ventforet Kofu	2011	J1 League	23	0	2	0	1	0	26	0
Shimizu S-Pulse	2012	J1 League	25	0	2	0	8	0	35	0
Shimizu S-Pulse	2013	J1 League	28	1	1	0	5	0	34	1
Shimizu S-Pulse	2014	J1 League	32	1	4	0	6	0	42	1
Sagan Tosu	2015	J1 League	31	1	3	0	4	1	38	2
Sagan Tosu	2016	J1 League	32	0	2	0	2	0	36	0
Sagan Tosu	2017	J1 League	30	0	2	0	3	0	35	0
Sagan Tosu	2018	J1 League	24	1	3	0	0	0	27	1
Nagoya Grampus	2019	J1 League	30	0	1	0	2	0	33	0
Nagoya Grampus	2020	J1 League	30	2	—		3	0	33	2
Nagoya Grampus	2021	J1 League	38	1	4	0	5	0	47	1
Nagoya Grampus	2022	J1 League	15	0	0	0	4	0	19	0
Shimizu S-Pulse	2023	J2 League	3	0	0	0	0	0	3	0
Career total			401	7	27	0	43	1	471	8

== Honors ==
Nagoya Grampus

- J.League Cup: 2021
