= Thales Paula =

Brazilian footballer

Personal information
- Full name: Thales Procopio Castro de Paula
- Date of birth: 29 June 2001 (age 25)
- Place of birth: Brazil
- Height: 1.75 m (5 ft 9 in)
- Position: Winger

Team information
- Current team: Tokushima Vortis
- Number: 77

Youth career
- PSTC
- 2018–2020: Shūgakukan High School

Senior career*
Years	Team	Apps	(Gls)
2021	Roasso Kumamoto	21	(4)
2022–2024	Nagoya Grampus	7	(0)
2022	→ Roasso Kumamoto (loan)	12	(0)
2024–	Tokushima Vortis	6	(0)
2025	→ Vanraure Hachinohe (loan)	1	(0)
2025–	→ AC Nagano Parceiro (loan)	16	(0)
- * Club domestic league appearances and goals as of 1 July 2026

Thales Procopio Castro de Paula (born 29 June 2001), commonly known as Thales Paula, is a Brazilian footballer who plays as a winger and currently play for J2 League club, AC Nagano Parceiro.

== Career ==
Thales began with Paraná Soccer Technical Center as youth career and moved to Japan and attended Shugakukan High School.

On 22 December 2020, he joined J3 club, Roasso Kumamoto with teammate Leo Kenta. On 2021, he officially signed with club. On 16 May 2021, he debuted play with J. League in second half against Nagano Parceiro in Matchweek 8. On 11 July 2021, he scored first goal in J. League against Iwate Grulla Morioka in Matchweek 15.

On 6 January 2022, he signed to J1 club Nagoya Grampus, although he was loaned straight back to Kumamoto for the 2022 season.

On 27 November 2022, Thales returned to Nagoya Grampus.

On 1 July 2024, Thales joined to J2 club, Tokushima Vortis for mid 2024 season.

On 5 January 2025, Thales joined to J3 club, Vanraure Hachinohe for 2025 season.

== Career statistics ==
=== Club ===
As of the start from 2025 season.

Club	Season	League			National Cup		League Cup		Other		Total	
Club	Season	Division	Apps	Goals	Apps	Goals	Apps	Goals	Apps	Goals	Apps	Goals
Roasso Kumamoto	2021	J3 League	21	4	2	0	–		0	0	23	4
Nagoya Grampus	2022	J1 League	0	0	0	0	0	0	–		0	0
Nagoya Grampus	2023	J1 League	7	0	2	0	4	0	–		13	0
Nagoya Grampus	2024	J1 League	0	0	1	0	1	0	–		2	0
Nagoya Grampus	Total		28	4	5	0	5	0	0	0	38	4
Roasso Kumamoto (loan)	2022	J2 League	12	0	0	0	–		3 (Note: three appearances in the Promotion playoff J1)	0	15	0
Tokushima Vortis	2024	J2 League	5	0	0	0	–		0	0	5	0
Vanraure Hachinohe	2025	J3 League	0	0	0	0	0	0	–		0	0
Vanraure Hachinohe	Total		17	0	0	0	0	0	3	0	20	0
Career total			45	4	5	0	5	0	3	0	58	4

== Honours ==
Roasso Kumamoto

- J3 League : 2021
