= Kazuya Miyahara =

Japanese footballer (born 1996)

Kazuya Miyahara 宮原和也
Personal information
- Full name: Kazuya Miyahara
- Date of birth: 22 March 1996 (age 30)
- Place of birth: Hiroshima, Japan
- Height: 1.72 m (5 ft 8 in)
- Positions: Right back; defensive midfielder

Team information
- Current team: Tokyo Verdy
- Number: 6

Youth career
- 2008–2013: Sanfrecce Hiroshima

Senior career*
Years	Team	Apps	(Gls)
2014–2018	Sanfrecce Hiroshima	20	(1)
2014–2015	→ J. League U-22 (loan)	7	(0)
2017–2018	→ Nagoya Grampus (loan)	67	(0)
2019–2022	Nagoya Grampus	83	(4)
2023–	Tokyo Verdy	120	(0)

International career
2013	Japan U-17	3	(0)
Medal record
Sanfrecce Hiroshima
Winner	J1 League	2015
Runner-up	J.League Cup	2014
Representing Japan
AFC U-16 Championship
Silver medal – second place	2012 Iran
- * Club domestic league appearances and goals as of 8 August 2026

Kazuya Miyahara (宮原和也, Miyahara Kazuya; born 22 March 1996 in Hiroshima) is a Japanese footballer who plays as a defensive midfielder for J1 League club Tokyo Verdy.

== Club career ==
On 26 December 2016, Miyahara joined Nagoya Grampus on a season-long loan deal, extended his loan deal with Nagoya Grampus 30 December 2017 for an additional year.

On 18 December 2018, Nagoya Grampus announced the permanent signing of Miyahara from Sanfrecce Hiroshima.

After four seasons with Nagoya, in December 2022 it was announced that Miyahara would be joining J2 League club Tokyo Verdy for the 2023 season.

== National team career ==
In October 2013, Miyahara was elected Japan U-17 national team for 2013 U-17 World Cup. He played three matches.

== Club statistics ==
As of 6 August 2023.

Appearances and goals by club, season and competition
Club	Season	League			National Cup		League Cup		Continental		Other		Total	
Club	Season	Division	Apps	Goals	Apps	Goals	Apps	Goals	Apps	Goals	Apps	Goals	Apps	Goals
Japan			League		Emperor's Cup		J.League Cup		AFC		Other		Total	
Sanfrecce Hiroshima	2014	J1 League	4	0	2	0	2	0	1	0	-		8	0
Sanfrecce Hiroshima	2015	J1 League	3	1	4	0	5	0	-		-		12	1
Sanfrecce Hiroshima	2016	J1 League	13	0	0	0	0	0	1	0	-		14	0
Sanfrecce Hiroshima	Total		20	1	6	0	7	0	2	0	-	-	35	1
J. League U-22 (loan)	2014	J3 League	5	0	-		-		-		-		5	0
J. League U-22 (loan)	2015	J3 League	2	0	-		-		-		-		2	0
J. League U-22 (loan)	Total		7	0	0	0	0	0	0	0	0	0	7	0
Nagoya Grampus (loan)	2017	J2 League	41	0	2	0	-		-		2 (Note: Appearances in J1/J2 play-offs)	0	45	0
Nagoya Grampus (loan)	2018	J1 League	26	0	1	0	2	0	-		-		29	0
Nagoya Grampus (loan)	Total		67	0	3	0	2	0	0	0	2	0	74	0
Nagoya Grampus	2019	J1 League	31	4	1	0	5	0	-		-		37	4
Nagoya Grampus	2020	J1 League	5	0	0	0	0	0	-		-		5	0
Nagoya Grampus	2021	J1 League	26	0	3	0	2	0	7	0	-		38	0
Nagoya Grampus	2022	J1 League	21	0	1	0	6	0	-		-		28	0
Nagoya Grampus	Total		83	4	5	0	13	0	7	0	0	0	108	4
Tokyo Verdy	2023	J2 League	28	0	0	0	-		-		-		28	0
Career total			205	4	14	0	22	0	9	0	2	0	252	5

== Honours ==
Nagoya Grampus

- J.League Cup: 2021

Individual

- J2 League Best XI: 2023
