= 2017 Japanese Super Cup =

Kashima Antlers	Urawa Red Diamonds
3	2
- Date: 18 February 2017
- Venue: Nissan Stadium, Yokohama
- Referee: Hiroyuki Kimura
- Attendance: 48,250
- Weather: 11.7 °C (53.1 °F); 31% humidity

The 2017 Japanese Super Cup was held on 18 February 2017 between the 2016 J1 League and 2016 Emperor's Cup champions Kashima Antlers and the 2016 J1 League runners-up Urawa Red Diamonds.

Kashima Antlers won the match 3–2; after Yasushi Endo's brace put Kashima 2–0 up before half-time, Urawa came back in the second half with a penalty scored by Shinzo Koroki and the equalizer by Yuki Muto, but a late winner from Yuma Suzuki proved to be the decisive goal.

== Match ==
18 February 2017
13:30 JST

Kashima Antlers	3–2	Urawa Red Diamonds
Endo 39', 43'; Suzuki 83'	Report	Koroki 74' (pen.); Muto 75'

Nissan Stadium, Yokohama
Attendance: 48,250
Referee: Hiroyuki Kimura

Kashima Antlers
GK	1	(South Korea) Kwoun Sun-tae
RB	22	(Japan) Daigo Nishi
CB	5	(Japan) Naomichi Ueda
CB	3	(Japan) Gen Shoji
LB	15	(Japan) Yuto Misao		(substituted off) 82'
CM	40	(Japan) Mitsuo Ogasawara (c)	(yellow card) 56'
CM	4	(Brazil) Léo Silva	(yellow card) 40'	(substituted off) 69'
RM	25	(Japan) Yasushi Endo
LM	8	(Japan) Shoma Doi
SS	11	(Brazil) Pedro Junior
CF	33	(Japan) Mu Kanazaki		(substituted off) 65'
Substitutes:
GK	21	(Japan) Hitoshi Sogahata
CB	16	(Japan) Shuto Yamamoto		(substituted on) 82'
RB	14	(Japan) Koki Machida
DM	6	(Japan) Ryota Nagaki		(substituted on) 69'
SS	11	(Brazil) Leandro
CF	14	(Japan) Takeshi Kanamori
CF	9	(Japan) Yuma Suzuki	(yellow card) 90+4'	(substituted on) 65'
Manager:
(Japan) Masatada Ishii

Urawa Red Diamonds
GK	1	(Japan) Shusaku Nishikawa
CB	46	(Japan) Ryota Moriwaki
CB	6	(Japan) Wataru Endo
CB	3	(Japan) Tomoya Ugajin
RM	14	(Japan) Yoshiaki Komai	(substituted off) 64'
DM	16	(Japan) Takuya Aoki	(yellow card) 24'
DM	22	(Japan) Yuki Abe (c)
LM	38	(Japan) Daisuke Kikuchi	(substituted off) 64'
AM	9	(Japan) Yuki Muto
AM	20	(Japan) Tadanari Lee		(substituted off) 46'
CF	21	(Slovenia) Zlatan Ljubijankić	(yellow card) 90+2'
Substitutes:
GK	25	(Japan) Tetsuya Enomoto
CB	4	(Japan) Daisuke Nasu
RM	14	(Japan) Tadaaki Hirakawa
WB	24	(Japan) Takahiro Sekine		(substituted on) 64'
CM	15	(Japan) Kazuki Nagasawa		(substituted on) 64'
AM	39	(Japan) Shinya Yajima
CF	30	(Japan) Shinzo Koroki		(substituted on) 46'
Manager:
(Serbia) Mihailo Petrović

=== Statistics ===
Statistic	Kashima Antlers	Urawa Red Diamonds
Goals scored	3	2
Possession	40%	60%
Shots on target	4	1
Shots off target	4	8
Corner kicks	1	3
Fouls	20	15
Offsides	1	3
Yellow cards	3	2
Red cards	0	0
