= Holneiker Mendes =

Brazilian footballer (born 1995)

Personal information
- Full name: Holneiker Mendes Marreiros
- Date of birth: April 25, 1995 (age 31)
- Place of birth: Brazil
- Height: 1.90 m (6 ft 3 in)
- Position: Defender

Team information
- Current team: Ventforet Kofu
- Number: 95

Youth career
- 2010–2013: Palmeiras

Senior career*
Years	Team	Apps	(Gls)
2014	Palmeiras		
2015	União Rondonópolis		
2015–2017	Zweigen Kanazawa	15	(2)
2017–2019	Tochigi SC	12	(0)
2020–2021	Ventforet Kofu	44	(6)
2022	Kyoto Sanga	20	(0)
2023–2024	JEF United Chiba	27	(2)
2026–	Ventforet Kofu	1	(0)
- * Club domestic league appearances and goals as of 17 August 2026

Holneiker Mendes Marreiros (born April 25, 1995) is a Brazilian professional footballer who plays as a centre back for Ventforet Kofu.

== Playing career ==
Mendes joined a J2 League club, Zweigen Kanazawa, in 2015; he then moved to Tochigi SC during 2017 season.

== Club statistics ==
As of 14 April 2026.

Appearances and goals by club, season and competition
Club	Season	League			National cup (Note: Includes Emperors Cup)		League cup (Note: Includes J.League Cup)		Other		Total	
Club	Season	Division	Apps	Goals	Apps	Goals	Apps	Goals	Apps	Goals	Apps	Goals
Zweigen Kanazawa	2015	J2 League	4	0	0	0	–		–		4	0
Zweigen Kanazawa	2016	J2 League	11	2	2	0	–		–		13	2
Zweigen Kanazawa	Total		15	2	2	0	0	0	0	0	17	2
Tochigi SC	2017	J3 League	11	0	0	0	–		–		11	0
Tochigi SC	2018	J2 League	0	0	0	0	–		–		0	0
Tochigi SC	2019	J2 League	1	0	1	0	–		–		2	0
Tochigi SC	Total		12	0	1	0	0	0	0	0	13	0
Ventforet Kofu	2020	J2 League	7	0	0	0	–		–		7	0
Ventforet Kofu	2021	J2 League	37	6	0	0	–		–		37	6
Ventforet Kofu	Total		44	6	0	0	0	0	0	0	44	6
Kyoto Sanga	2022	J1 League	20	0	5	0	3	0	–		28	0
JEF United Chiba	2023	J2 League	7	1	0	0	0	0	1 (Note: Appearance in J1/J2 play-offs)	0	8	1
JEF United Chiba	2024	J2 League	20	1	4	0	1	0	0	0	25	1
JEF United Chiba	Total		27	2	4	0	1	0	1	0	33	2
Career total			118	10	12	0	4	0	1	0	135	10
