= Léo Silva =

Brazilian footballer

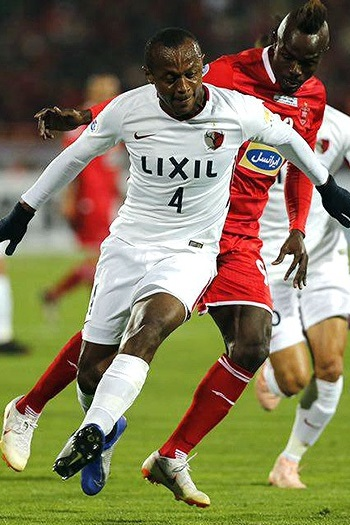
- Silva with Kashima Antlers at the 2018 AFC Champions League

Personal information
- Full name: Hugo Leonardo da Silva Serejo
- Date of birth: 24 December 1985 (age 40)
- Place of birth: São Luis, Brazil
- Height: 1.81 m (5 ft 11 in)
- Position: Defensive midfielder

Team information
- Current team: Moto Club

Youth career
- 2003: URT

Senior career*
| Years | Team | Apps | (Gls) |
| 2003–2009 | Cruzeiro | 31 | (1) |
| 2004–2006 | → Ipatinga (loan) | 2 | (0) |
| 2008 | → Ipatinga (loan) | 11 | (0) |
| 2009 | → Botafogo (loan) | 35 | (0) |
| 2010–2011 | Guaratinguetá | 70 | (3) |
| 2012 | Portuguesa | 54 | (6) |
| 2013–2016 | Albirex Niigata | 122 | (16) |
| 2017–2021 | Kashima Antlers | 135 | (8) |
| 2022 | Nagoya Grampus | 33 | (1) |
| 2023– | Moto Club | 11 | (2) |

International career
| 2004 | Brazil U-20 | | |
- * Club domestic league appearances and goals as of 7 January 2024

Hugo Leonardo da Silva Serejo or simply Léo Silva (レオ・シルバ, born 24 December 1985), is a Brazilian professional footballer who plays as a defensive midfielder for Moto Club.

== Club career ==
Léo Silva was born in São Luis, Brazil. He started his youth career at URT and was signed by Cruzeiro in 2003.

In 2004, he was loaned to Ipatinga, where he ended up playing for four seasons. During that time, he was part of the team that won the Campeonato Mineiro state league in 2005, although he only made three appearances that season. The following season he made 7 more appearances in all competitions for Ipatinga, until he moved back to Cruzeiro for the rest of the season where he made his debut in the Brasileirão. He also scored his first top flight goal in the 2006 season, in a 3–1 win over Botafogo.

After making 20 more appearances for Cruzeiro in 2007 season, Silva then was sent on a series of loans: firstly back to Ipatinga in 2008 and then to Botafogo in 2009. At the end of the 2009 season, he was released by Cruzeiro and eventually signed by Guaratinguetá where he spent two seasons in Série B. Following two successful seasons with Guaratinguetá, Silva was signed by Portuguesa to again play in the Brasileirão. After making almost 60 appearances in one season for Portuguesa, Silva moved on quickly and was signed by J-League club Albirex Niigata on a free transfer.

Silva went on to make 149 appearances over four seasons with Albirex Niigata, but never managed to win any team silverware, however he was included in the J-League Best XI for his performances in the 2014 season. He then signed for the champions Kashima Antlers for the 2017 season. It wasn't long before tasting success, as Kashima won the 2017 Japanese Super Cup with a 3–2 victory over Urawa Red Diamonds with Silva in the starting XI for the final. Domestically, Kashima finished runners up in the league, only losing out on goal difference to Kawasaki Frontale on the final day of the season. Silva also made his AFC Champions League debut in the 2017 season in a 2–0 win over K-League outfit Ulsan Hyundai. In the 2018 season, Kashima again missed out on the J-League title but Silva was a key part of the squad that won the 2018 AFC Champions League – playing 11 games and scoring 2 goals during the competition, including a goal in the quarter-final against Tianjin Quanjian. In the final against Iranian club Persepolis, Silva scored his second goal in the competition with a low left-footed drive from the edge of the box and was later named man of the match for his performance in the first leg of the final.

Silva has also made appearances in the Club World Cup after Kashima's results in the AFC Champions League and was part of the team in a 3–1 defeat to Real Madrid in the 2018 semi-finals.

In December 2021, it was announced Silva would be leaving Kashima and joining Nagoya Grampus on a free transfer, where he would take the number 16 shirt. In his only season with Nagoya, he appeared in the majority of their games and played well over 2000 minutes. However, at the end of the 2022 season, it was announced that Silva would be leaving the club and moving back to Brazil with his hometown team Moto Club.

== Career statistics ==
As of match played 7 January 2024.

Appearances and goals by club, season and competition
| Club | Season | League | | | State League | | National cup | | League cup | | Continental | | Other | | Total | |
| Club | Season | Division | Apps | Goals | Apps | Goals | Apps | Goals | Apps | Goals | Apps | Goals | Apps | Goals | Apps | Goals |
|---|---|---|---|---|---|---|---|---|---|---|---|---|---|---|---|---|
| Cruzeiro | 2006 | Série A | 14 | 1 | — | | — | | — | | — | | — | | 14 | 1 |
| Cruzeiro | 2007 | Série A | 13 | 0 | 4 | 0 | 3 | 0 | — | | — | | — | | 20 | 0 |
| Cruzeiro | Total | | 27 | 1 | 4 | 0 | 3 | 0 | 0 | 0 | 0 | 0 | 0 | 0 | 34 | 1 |
| Ipatinga (loan) | 2005 | Mineiro | — | | 1 | 0 | 2 | 0 | — | | — | | — | | 3 | 0 |
| Ipatinga (loan) | 2006 | Série C | — | | 1 | 0 | 6 | 1 | — | | — | | — | | 7 | 1 |
| Ipatinga (loan) | Total | | 0 | 0 | 2 | 0 | 8 | 1 | 0 | 0 | 0 | 0 | 0 | 0 | 10 | 1 |
| Ipatinga (loan) | 2008 | Série A | 11 | 0 | — | | — | | — | | — | | — | | 11 | 0 |
| Botafogo (loan) | 2009 | Série A | 18 | 0 | 17 | 0 | 3 | 0 | — | | 3 | 0 | — | | 41 | 0 |
| Guaratinguetá | 2010 | Série B | 21 | 1 | — | | — | | — | | — | | — | | 21 | 1 |
| Guaratinguetá | 2011 | Série B | 31 | 1 | 18 | 1 | — | | — | | — | | — | | 49 | 2 |
| Guaratinguetá | Total | | 52 | 2 | 18 | 1 | 0 | 0 | 0 | 0 | 0 | 0 | 0 | 0 | 70 | 3 |
| Portuguesa | 2012 | Série A | 36 | 4 | 18 | 2 | 5 | 0 | — | | — | | — | | 59 | 6 |
| Albirex Niigata | 2013 | J1 League | 32 | 1 | — | | 2 | 1 | 5 | 1 | — | | — | | 39 | 3 |
| Albirex Niigata | 2014 | J1 League | 33 | 6 | — | | 1 | 0 | 6 | 0 | — | | — | | 40 | 6 |
| Albirex Niigata | 2015 | J1 League | 25 | 4 | — | | 1 | 1 | 6 | 0 | — | | — | | 32 | 5 |
| Albirex Niigata | 2016 | J1 League | 32 | 5 | — | | 2 | 0 | 4 | 1 | — | | — | | 38 | 6 |
| Albirex Niigata | Total | | 122 | 16 | 0 | 0 | 6 | 2 | 21 | 2 | 0 | 0 | 0 | 0 | 149 | 20 |
| Kashima Antlers | 2017 | J1 League | 27 | 1 | — | | 1 | 0 | 2 | 0 | 6 | 1 | 1 | 0 | 37 | 2 |
| Kashima Antlers | 2018 | J1 League | 20 | 2 | — | | 2 | 1 | 4 | 0 | 11 | 2 | 3 | 0 | 40 | 5 |
| Kashima Antlers | 2019 | J1 League | 27 | 4 | — | | 4 | 0 | 2 | 0 | 8 | 0 | — | | 41 | 4 |
| Kashima Antlers | 2020 | J1 League | 32 | 1 | — | | — | | 2 | 0 | 1 | 0 | — | | 35 | 1 |
| Kashima Antlers | 2021 | J1 League | 29 | 0 | — | | 2 | 0 | 4 | 0 | — | | — | | 35 | 0 |
| Kashima Antlers | Total | | 135 | 8 | 0 | 0 | 9 | 1 | 14 | 0 | 26 | 3 | 4 | 0 | 188 | 12 |
| Nagoya Grampus | 2022 | J1 League | 33 | 1 | — | | 3 | 0 | 7 | 0 | — | | — | | 43 | 1 |
| Moto Club | 2023 | Maranhense | — | | 7 | 2 | — | | — | | — | | — | | 7 | 2 |
| Moto Club | 2024 | Série D | 0 | 0 | 4 | 0 | 0 | 0 | — | | — | | 1 | 0 | 5 | 0 |
| Moto Club | Total | | 0 | 0 | 11 | 2 | 0 | 0 | 0 | 0 | 0 | 0 | 1 | 0 | 12 | 2 |
| Total | | | 434 | 32 | 70 | 5 | 37 | 4 | 42 | 2 | 29 | 3 | 5 | 0 | 617 | 46 |

== Honours ==
Ipatinga

- Campeonato Mineiro: 2005

Cruzeiro

- Campeonato Mineiro: 2008

|Botafogo

- Taça Guanabara: 2009

Kashima Antlers

- Japanese Super Cup: 2017
- AFC Champions League: 2018

Individual

- J-League Best XI: 2014
