= Ryota Nagaki =

Japanese footballer (born 1988)

Ryota Nagaki 永木 亮太
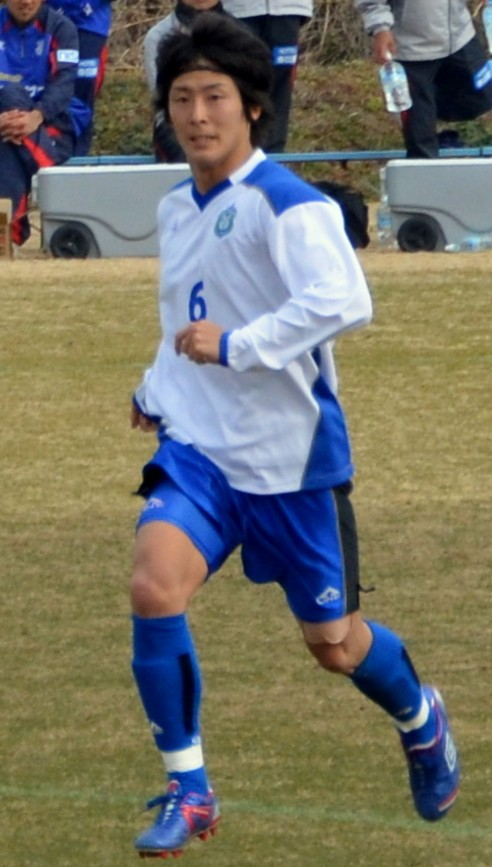
- Nagaki with Shonan Bellmare in 2011

Personal information
- Full name: Ryota Nagaki
- Date of birth: June 4, 1988 (age 38)
- Place of birth: Yokohama, Kanagawa, Japan
- Height: 1.73 m (5 ft 8 in)
- Position: Defensive midfielder

Team information
- Current team: Iwaki FC

Youth career
- 1998–1999: Verdy Kawasaki
- 2000: FC Nara
- 2001–2006: Kawasaki Frontale

College career
Years	Team	Apps	(Gls)
2007–2010	Chuo University		

Senior career*
Years	Team	Apps	(Gls)
2010–2015	Shonan Bellmare	184	(19)
2016–2021	Kashima Antlers	156	(2)
2022–2023	Shonan Bellmare	23	(0)
2022	→ Nagoya Grampus (loan)	12	(0)
2023	→ Tokushima Vortis (loan)	11	(1)
2024-2025	Tokushima Vortis	41	(0)
2026-	Iwaki FC		

International career
2016	Japan	1	(0)
Medal record
Kashima Antlers
Winner	AFC Champions League	2018
Winner	J1 League	2016
Runner-up	J1 League	2017
Winner	Emperor's Cup	2016
- * Club domestic league appearances and goals as of 1 January 2026

Ryota Nagaki (永木 亮太; born June 4, 1988) is a Japanese footballer who plays as a midfielder for Iwaki FC.

== Club career ==
=== Shonan Bellmare ===
Nagaki started his career with the Kawasaki Frontale youth teams, playing for both their U-15 and U-18 teams before playing for Chuo University. In his fourth year of study, he was approved as a specially designated player by the JFA in the 2010 season for Shonan Bellmare. He took the number 41 shirt and made his league debut for Shonan in July 2010, coming on as second-half substitute in 1–0 defeat to Kashima Antlers. He made nine appearances in his debut season where Shonan finished bottom of the league and therefore relegated to the J2 League.

In his second season representing Shonan Bellmare, Nagaki was given the number 6 shirt and made 40 appearances across all competitions, however 2011 was another disappointing season for the club as they finished 14th of 20 teams in the second tier. Nagaki did score his first goal for the club in this season, scoring in the 41st minute in a 1–0 victory of Sagan Tosu. This was the first of four league goals in the 2011 season.

Nagaki continued to be a regular starter for Shonan over the next few seasons, as the club yo-yoed between the first and second tier. Things improved drastically in the 2012 season, as Nagaki made a further 43 appearances and scoring two goals for Shonan, helping them finish in 2nd place in the league and gaining automatic promotion back to the J1 League. They then finished 16th of 18 in the 2013 season and were relegated, but were then promoted again immediately in the 2014 season after scoring over 100 points and winning the J2 League by a considerable margin. Nagaki also had his highest scoring season, contributing six goals in 31 matches. Nagaki then had one more season the top-flight for Shonan in 2015, before signing for Kashima Antlers in December 2015 ahead of the 2016 season.

=== Kashima Antlers ===
Nagaki started his career with Kashima in impressive fashion, making 45 appearances across all competitions which included the team winning both the J1 League and the Emperor's Cup. His performances for Kashima had not gone unnoticed and on 29 September 2016, he was called up for Japan for the first time in his career. These successes led Nagaki to make his first continental appearances, firstly in a 1–0 defeat to Independiente Santa Fe in the J.League Cup / Copa Sudamericana Championship and finally in the FIFA Club World Cup. Kashima impressively ended up as runners-up in the competition, beating Auckland City FC, Mamelodi Sundowns and Atlético Nacional on their way to a gutsy extra-time defeat in the final against a star-studded Real Madrid team. Nagaki played 114 minutes in the final.

It was almost a double for Kashima, as they finished runners-up in the league on goal difference in the 2017 season. They did win some silverware though, with a 3–2 victory over Urawa Red Diamonds in the Japanese Super Cup – Nagaki being used as a second-half substitute. Nagaki made his debut in the AFC Champions League in this season, playing 90 minutes in a 2–0 win over K League outfit Ulsan Hyundai. Nagaki scored his first goal in a continental competition, turning in a ball across the box from Atsutaka Nakamura, but it was not enough in eventually falling to a 2–1 defeat to Brisbane Roar. Kashima topped their group in the first stage of the competition, but were knocked out in the round of 16 against Guangzhou Evergrande. The 2018 AFC Champions League was much more fruitful for Kashima, as they won the competition for the first time in their history after a 2–0 aggregate win over Persepolis.

Nagaki played his highest number of minutes for Kashima in the 2019 season, regularly playing in the starting XI and making 50 appearances across all competitions. This was the first season without a major trophy for Nagaki, but Kashima were runners-up in the Emperor's Cup after a 2–0 defeat to Vissel Kobe. Kashima made it into the quarter-finals of the 2019 AFC Champions League, but were again knocked out by Guangzhou Evergrande.

In the 2020 season under new manager Antônio Carlos Zago, Nagaki played less frequently than previous seasons, only making 12 league starts with only a handful of 90 minute appearances. Kashima finished 5th in the league. The 2021 season also proved difficult for Nagaki – appearing mainly in cup competitions, he only played 450 league minutes throughout the season. At the end of the season, it was announced that he would be rejoining his first club Shonan Bellmare on a free transfer after five seasons with Kashima.

=== Nagoya Grampus ===
After playing only 11 matches from the start to the middle of the 2022 season, he was signed to Nagoya Grampus on a loan transfer until January 31, in 2023. He went on to play 14 times for Nagoya in the second half of the 2022 season.

=== Return to Shonan Bellmare ===
In January 2023, Nagaki returned to Shonan for the 2023 J1 League season.

== International career ==
In September 2016, Nagaki was called up to the national team as manager Vahid Halilhodzic wanted to give an opportunity to players to check the quality of their play. Nagaki played 68 minutes of Japan's 4–0 friendly win over Oman. This has been his only international cap to date.

== Career statistics ==
=== Club ===
As of 11 March 2023.

Club performance			League		Cup		League Cup		Continental		Other		Total	
Season	Club	League	Apps	Goals	Apps	Goals	Apps	Goals	Apps	Goals	Apps	Goals	Apps	Goals
Japan			League		Emperor's Cup		J. League Cup		AFC		Other^{1}		Total	
2010	Shonan Bellmare	J1 League	11	0	0	0	0	0	-		-		11	0
2011	Shonan Bellmare	J2 League	36	4	4	0	-		-		-		40	4
2012	Shonan Bellmare	J2 League	41	2	2	0	-		-		-		43	2
2013	Shonan Bellmare	J1 League	33	4	2	0	4	0	-		-		39	4
2014	Shonan Bellmare	J2 League	31	6	0	0	-		-		-		31	6
2015	Shonan Bellmare	J1 League	32	3	1	0	2	0	-		-		35	3
2016	Kashima Antlers	J1 League	29	0	5	1	3	1	-		8	0	45	2
2017	Kashima Antlers	J1 League	20	1	4	0	1	0	8	1	1	0	40	1
2018	Kashima Antlers	J1 League	30	1	5	0	4	0	13	0	3	1	55	2
2019	Kashima Antlers	J1 League	31	0	6	0	4	0	9	0	-		50	0
2020	Kashima Antlers	J1 League	31	0	-		2	0	0	0	-		33	0
2021	Kashima Antlers	J1 League	15	0	2	0	6	0	-		-		23	0
2022	Shonan Bellmare	J1 League	6	0	2	1	3	0	-		-		11	1
2022	Nagoya Grampus (loan)	J1 League	12	0	0	0	2	0	-		-		14	0
2023	Shonan Bellmare	J1 League	3	0	0	0	0	0	-		-		3	0
Total			361	21	33	2	31	1	30	1	12	1	473	25

^{1}Includes Japanese Super Cup, J. League Championship, FIFA Club World Cup and Suruga Bank Championship.

=== International ===
As of match played 11 November 2016

Appearances and goals by national team and year
National team	Year	Apps	Goals
Japan	2016	1	0
Total		1	0

== Honours ==
Shonan Bellmare

- J2 League: 2014

Kashima Antlers

- J1 League: 2016
- Emperor's Cup: 2016, 2019 Runners-up
- Japanese Super Cup: 2017
- Club World Cup: 2016 Runners-up
- J.League Cup / Copa Sudamericana Championship: 2016 Runners-up
- AFC Champions League: 2018
