= Kim Min-ho (footballer, born 2000) =

Japanese footballer

Personal information
- Full name: Kim Min-ho
- Date of birth: 25 January 2000 (age 26)
- Place of birth: South Korea
- Height: 1.92 m (6 ft 4 in)
- Position: Goalkeeper

Team information
- Current team: SC Sagamihara
- Number: 21

Youth career
- –2018: Boin HS
- 2019–2021: Sagan Tosu

Senior career*
Years	Team	Apps	(Gls)
2021–2022	Sagan Tosu	0	(0)
2021	→ Nagano Parceiro (loan)	1	(0)
2022–2024	Nagano Parceiro	46	(0)
2025	Seoul E-Land	2	(0)
2026–	SC Sagamihara	13	(0)
- * Club domestic league appearances and goals as of 17 August 2026

- Kim Min-ho
- Hangul: 김민호
- RR: Gim Minho
- MR: Kim Minho

Kim Min-ho (Korean: 김민호; born 25 January 2000) is a South Korean professional footballer who plays as a goalkeeper for Japanese J3 League club SC Sagamihara.

== Early life ==
Kim was born in South Korea. He played for Boin HS and Sagan Tosu in his youth.

== Career ==
Kim made his debut for Nagano on 20 October 2021.

== Career statistics ==
=== Club ===
As of 27 October 2021.

Club	Season	League			National Cup		League Cup		Other		Total	
Club	Season	Division	Apps	Goals	Apps	Goals	Apps	Goals	Apps	Goals	Apps	Goals
Sagan Tosu	2021	J1 League	0	0	0	0	0	0	0	0	0	0
Nagano Parceiro (loan)	2021	J3 League	1	0	0	0	–		0	0	1	0
Career total			1	0	0	0	0	0	0	0	1	0
