= Takuya Shigehiro =

Japanese footballer

Takuya Shigehiro 重廣 卓也
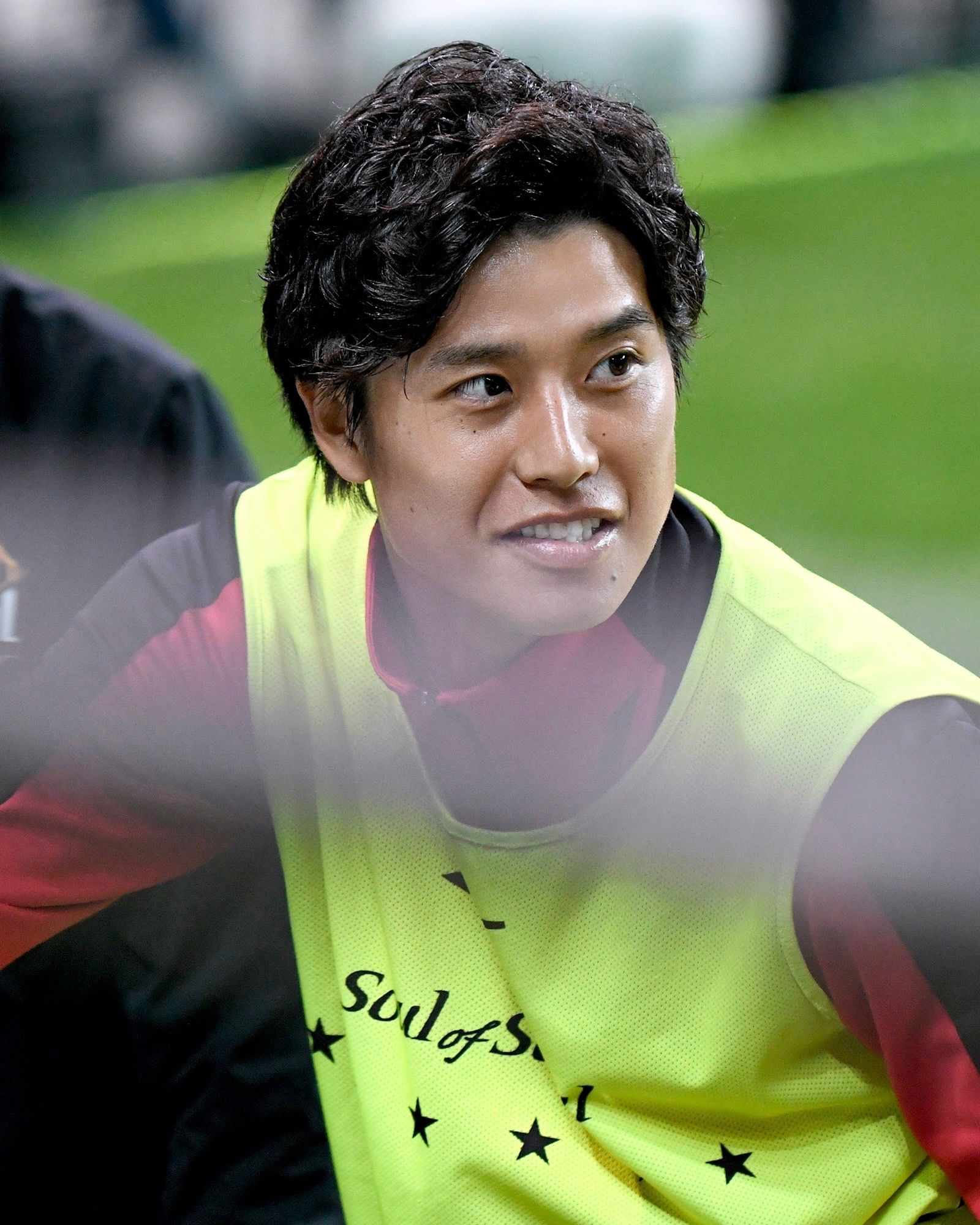
- Shigehiro in 2024

Personal information
- Date of birth: 5 May 1995 (age 31)
- Place of birth: Miyoshi, Hiroshima, Japan
- Height: 1.79 m (5 ft 10 in)
- Position: Midfielder

Team information
- Current team: Tokushima Vortis
- Number: 55

Youth career
- Miyoshi SC SSS
- –2010: AC Minami
- 2011–2013: Hiroshima Minami High School

College career
Years	Team	Apps	(Gls)
2014–2017	Hannan University		

Senior career*
Years	Team	Apps	(Gls)
2018–2019	Kyoto Sanga	61	(5)
2020–2022	Avispa Fukuoka	44	(1)
2022−2024	Nagoya Grampus	16	(1)
2024	→ FC Seoul (loan)	2	(0)
2025−	Tokushima Vortis	23	(0)
- * Club domestic league appearances and goals as of 14 August 2026

Takuya Shigehiro (重廣 卓也, Shigehiro Takuya; born 5 May 1995) is a Japanese professional footballer who plays as a midfielder for Tokushima Vortis.

== Career statistics ==
Last update: 9 July 2022.

Club performance			League		Cup		League Cup		Total	
Season	Club	League	Apps	Goals	Apps	Goals	Apps	Goals	Apps	Goals
Japan			League		Emperor's Cup		League Cup		Total	
2018	Kyoto Sanga	J2 League	32	3	1	0	−		33	3
2019	Kyoto Sanga	J2 League	29	2	0	0	-		29	2
2020	Avispa Fukuoka	J2 League	19	1	−		−		19	1
2021	Avispa Fukuoka	J1 League	23	0	1	0	3	0	27	0
2022	Avispa Fukuoka	J1 League	2	0	1	0	3	0	6	0
Career total			105	6	3	0	6	0	114	6
