= Kwoun Sun-tae =

South Korean football player (born 1984)

Kwoun Sun-tae 권순태權純泰
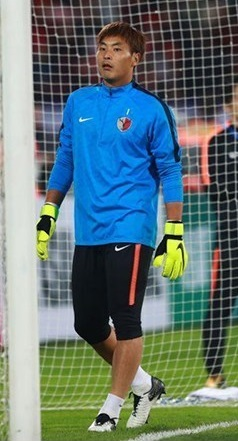
- Kwoun with Kashima Antlers in 2018

Personal information
- Full name: Kwoun Sun-tae
- Date of birth: September 11, 1984 (age 42)
- Place of birth: Paju, South Korea
- Height: 1.84 m (6 ft 0 in)
- Position: Goalkeeper

Team information
- Current team: Kashima Antlers (Assistant goalkeeping coach)

Youth career
- 2002–2005: Jeonju University

Senior career*
Years	Team	Apps	(Gls)
2006–2016	Jeonbuk Hyundai Motors	231	(0)
2011–2012	→ Sangju Sangmu (army)	31	(0)
2017–2023	Kashima Antlers	108	(0)
Total		370	(0)

International career
2015–2017	South Korea	6	(0)
- * Club domestic league appearances and goals

Kwoun Sun-tae (Korean: 권순태; Hanja: 權純泰; Korean pronunciation: [kwʌn.sun.tʰɛ̝]; born September 11, 1984) is a South Korean former professional footballer who played as a goalkeeper for Jeonbuk Hyundai Motors, Kashima Antlers and the South Korea national football team.

== Club career ==
=== Jeonbuk Hyundai Motors ===
After graduating from Jeonju University, Kwoun signed his first professional deal with Jeonbuk Hyundai Motors in 2006 and quickly displaced team-mate Lee Kwang-suk as first choice goalkeeper. Kwoun made 43 first team appearances in his first season, most notably winning the 2006 AFC Champions League after beating Al-Karamah SC in the final.

After a successful debut season, Kwoun cemented himself as Jeonbuk's first choice goalkeeper for Jeonbuk under manager Choi Kang-hee. He was an integral part of the team during the 2009 season, where Jeonbuk claimed their first ever K-League title.

=== Loan to Sangju Sangmu ===
He continued to play for the club until 2011, when he was required to carry out mandatory military service and joined military club Sangju Sangmu for just under two seasons. During this loan spell, Jeonbuk won the league and again reached the Champions League Final and it being played at Jeonju Stadium, Kwoun used his vacation from the military to go and support the team amongst the fans. He later said that the disappointing experience of seeing Jeonbuk lose at home in this final would change his mentality and spur him on to be more prepared for finals in the future. Returning from military service midway through the 2012 season, Kwoun struggled to break back into the team and played only a handful of games for the remainder of the 2012 season and the 2013 season.

=== Return to Jeonbuk ===
After two years spent managing the South Korean national team, Choi Kang-hee returned to manage Jeonbuk in 2013 and by the 2014 season, Kwoun was returned to the starting line-up after the retirement of Choi Eun-sung. Kwoun played a key role as Jeonbuk went on to win back-to-back league titles and would have won three in a row if they were not deducted nine points for their part in a scandal which involved bribing referees during the 2013 season. Kwoun was selected as the best goalkeeper in the league for three straight seasons, being named part of the K League Best XI in 2014, 2015 (as well as winning the Golden Glove award) and 2016.

For the 2016 season, Kwoun was named captain of Jeonbuk and it was arguably the best season of his career. Conceding only 40 goals in the league all season, he was said to be the most reliable goalkeeper in the league. He also went on to win his second AFC Champions League title after a hard-fought 3-2 aggregate win over Al-Ain. Kwoun had a fantastic performance in the second leg, denying Al-Ain striker Douglas multiple times as well as a pulling off a crucial reaction save to deny substitute Ibrahim Diaky late in the game.

=== Kashima Antlers ===
When it was later revealed that Jeonbuk would be refused entry into the 2017 AFC Champions League after an additional review into their 2013 bribery scandal, Kwoun eventually accepted an offer of a three-year contract from J-League champions Kashima Antlers.

Kwoun was not first-choice goalkeeper with Kashima in his first season, despite being given the number one shirt, as long term servant of the club Hitoshi Sogahata retained the main goalkeeping duties. He was however in goal for the season-opener, as Kwoun won his first trophy with Kashima in his first game after they lifted the 2017 Japanese Super Cup with a 3–2 win over Urawa Red Diamonds. In the 2018 season, Kwoun became first choice goalkeeper and was part of the squad that won the 2018 AFC Champions League – the third time he was won that competition. Kashima were only the third side from Japan to win the title. Much like the 2016 final, Kwoun played magnificently, keeping a clean sheet in both legs against Persepolis. He was rewarded with the player of the week award for his heroics in the second leg after making 6 saves and topping the player ratings.

Kwoun continued to be an ever present part of the team during the 2019 season, but from the 2020 season team-mate Yuya Oki started the majority of games for Kashima in place of Kwoun. With a change in management for Kashima in the 2022 season, Kwoun was back to being first-choice goalkeeper and played the majority of games for the club throughout the season.

In the 2023 season, Kwoun did not make a single appearance for Kashima and announced his retirement at the end of the season.

== International career ==
In 2012, Kwoun was called up for international duty but did not play. Kwoun made his international debut match for South Korea against Laos on September 3, 2015, and kept a clean sheet. Kwoun went on to make another four appearances for the national team during the qualification round of the 2018 World Cup, only conceding three goals in total. His final international appearance was in a 3–2 defeat to Qatar in June 2017, which led to the sacking of then South Korea manager Uli Stielike. Unfortunately for Kwoun, Stielke's successor Shin Tae-Yong did not pick him in the squad again and he did not make the final 23 man squad for the World Cup.

== Coaching career ==
=== Kashima Antlers ===
Kwoun remained at Kashima Antlers after retirement, having been handed a position on Ranko Popović's coaching staff as an assistant goalkeeping coach.

== Career statistics ==
Appearances and goals by club, season and competition
Club performance			League		Cup		League Cup		Continental		Others		Total	
Season	Club	League	Apps	Goals	Apps	Goals	Apps	Goals	Apps	Goals	Apps	Goals	Apps	Goals
South Korea			League		KFA Cup		League Cup		Asia		Others		Total	
2006	Jeonbuk Hyundai Motors	K League 1	19	0	2	0	11	0	9	0	2	0	43	0
2007	Jeonbuk Hyundai Motors	K League 1	20	0	1	0	7	0	0	0	—		28	0
2008	Jeonbuk Hyundai Motors	K League 1	24	0	3	0	9	0	—		-—		36	0
2009	Jeonbuk Hyundai Motors	K League 1	29	0	4	0	4	0	—		—		37	0
2010	Jeonbuk Hyundai Motors	K League 1	24	0	1	0	6	0	6	0	—		37	0
2011	Sangju Sangmu (army)	K League 1	15	0	1	0	2	0	—		—		18	0
2012	Sangju Sangmu (army)	K League 1	16	0	0	0	—		—		—		16	0
2012	Jeonbuk Hyundai Motors	K League 1	2	0	0	0	—		—		—		2	0
2013	Jeonbuk Hyundai Motors	K League 1	8	0	1	0	—		5	0	—		14	0
2014	Jeonbuk Hyundai Motors	K League 1	34	0	4	0	—		5	0	—		43	0
2015	Jeonbuk Hyundai Motors	K League 1	36	0	1	0	—		8	0	—		45	0
2016	Jeonbuk Hyundai Motors	K League 1	35	0	2	0	—		14	0	—		51	0
Japan			League		Emperor's Cup		League Cup		Asia		Others^{1}		Total	
2017	Kashima Antlers	J1 League	12	0	1	0	1	0	7	0	1	0	22	0
2018	Kashima Antlers	J1 League	27	0	2	0	0	0	10	0	3	0	42	0
2019	Kashima Antlers	J1 League	30	0	2	0	3	0	11	0	—		41	0
2020	Kashima Antlers	J1 League	7	0	0	0	1	0	1	0	—		5	0
2021	Kashima Antlers	J1 League	5	0	1	0	7	0	—		—		13	0
2022	Kashima Antlers	J1 League	27	0	2	0	3	0	—		—		32	0
2023	Kashima Antlers	J1 League	0	0	0	0	0	0	—		—		0	0
Total	South Korea		262	0	20	0	39	0	47	0	2	0	370	0
Total	Japan		108	0	8	0	15	0	28	0	4	0	159	0
Career total			370	0	28	0	54	0	75	0	6	0	529	0

^{1}Other tournaments include Japanese Super Cup and FIFA Club World Cup

== Honours ==
=== Club ===
Jeonbuk Hyundai Motors

- K League 1: 2009, 2014, 2015
- AFC Champions League: 2006, 2016

Kashima Antlers

- Japanese Super Cup: 2017
- AFC Champions League: 2018

=== Individual ===
- K League Classic Best XI: 2014, 2015, 2016
- AFC Champions League Player of the week: 2018 finals 2nd leg
