= Keiya Sento =

Japanese footballer (born 1994)

Keiya Sento 仙頭 啓矢
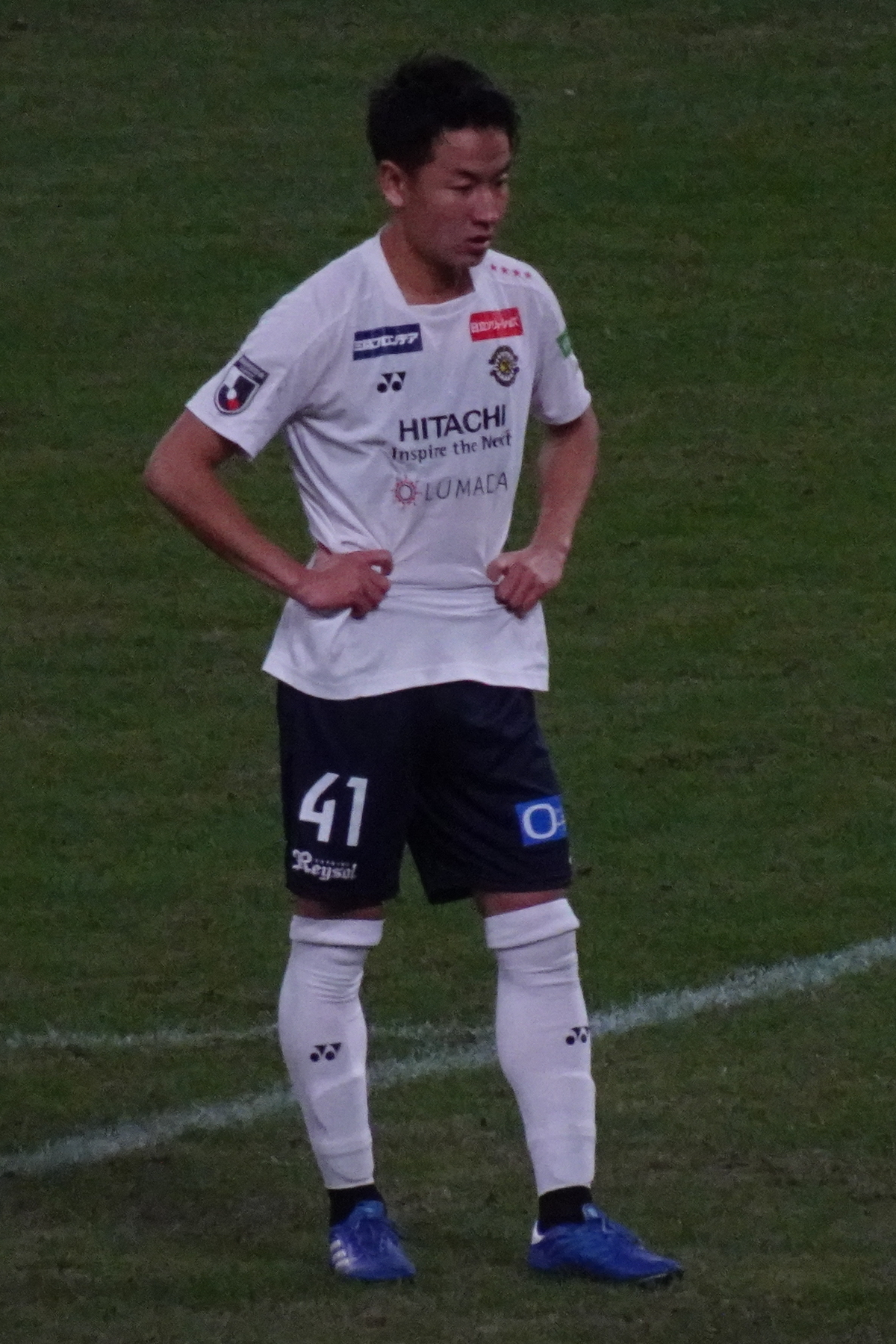
- Keiya Sento playing for Kashiwa Reysol in 2023.

Personal information
- Full name: Keiya Sento
- Date of birth: December 29, 1994 (age 31)
- Place of birth: Hirataka, Osaka, Japan
- Height: 1.71 m (5 ft 7 1/2 in)
- Positions: Attacking midfielder; winger

Team information
- Current team: FC Machida Zelvia
- Number: 8

Youth career
- 2010–2012: Kyoto Tachibana High School

College career
Years	Team	Apps	(Gls)
2013–2016	Toyo University		

Senior career*
Years	Team	Apps	(Gls)
2017–2019	Kyoto Sanga	99	(16)
2020	Yokohama F. Marinos	3	(0)
2020	→ Kyoto Sanga (loan)	19	(6)
2021	Sagan Tosu	38	(3)
2022	Nagoya Grampus	34	(2)
2023	Kashiwa Reysol	26	(0)
2024–	Machida Zelvia	75	(2)
- * Club domestic league appearances and goals as of 9 August 2026

Keiya Sento (仙頭 啓矢, Sentō Keiya; born December 29, 1994) is a Japanese professional footballer who plays as an attacking midfielder or a winger for J1 League club Machida Zelvia.

== Career ==
Keiya Sento joined J2 League club Kyoto Sanga FC in 2017 and played 99 games for the club over three seasons.

In May 2019, he won the J2 League Monthly MVP award after scoring three goals and providing two assists in five games.

After three seasons, he joined J1 League club Yokohama F. Marinos in 2020. After playing only three games for the Marinos, Sento was loaned back to Kyoto Sanga in the same season and eventually moved on at the end of the season to Sagan Tosu.

Sento then joined Nagoya Grampus for the 2022 season. After playing 45 games for Nagoya, Sento then moved on again after one season, this time joining fellow J1 League team Kashiwa Reysol for the 2023 season.

== Club statistics ==
As of 4 March 2023

Appearances and goals by club, season and competition
Club	Season	League			National cup		League cup		Total	
Club	Season	Division	Apps	Goals	Apps	Goals	Apps	Goals	Apps	Goals
Japan			League		Emperor's Cup		J. League Cup		Total	
Kyoto Sanga	2017	J2 League	24	5	0	0	–		24	5
Kyoto Sanga	2018	J2 League	39	1	0	0	–		39	1
Kyoto Sanga	2019	J2 League	36	10	0	0	–		36	10
Kyoto Sanga	Total		99	16	0	0	0	0	99	16
Yokohama F. Marinos	2020	J1 League	3	0	0	0	0	0	3	0
Kyoto Sanga (loan)	2020	J2 League	19	6	0	0	–		19	6
Sagan Tosu	2021	J1 League	38	3	3	0	1	0	42	3
Nagoya Grampus	2022	J1 League	34	2	3	0	8	0	45	2
Kashiwa Reysol	2023	J1 League	3	0	0	0	0	0	3	0
Career total			196	27	6	0	9	0	211	27

== Honours ==
=== Club ===
Machida Zelvia

- Emperor's Cup: 2025
