= Mateus Castro =

Brazilian footballer

Personal information
- Full name: Mateus dos Santos Castro
- Date of birth: 11 September 1994 (age 32)
- Place of birth: Itabuna, Bahia, Brazil
- Height: 1.67 m (5 ft 6 in)
- Position: Winger

Team information
- Current team: Nagoya Grampus
- Number: 10

Youth career
- 2010: Itabuna
- 2011–2012: Cruzeiro
- 2013–2014: Bahia

Senior career*
| Years | Team | Apps | (Gls) |
| 2014–2017 | Bahia | 4 | (0) |
| 2014 | → Omiya Ardija (loan) | 0 | (0) |
| 2015–2016 | → Omiya Ardija (loan) | 27 | (2) |
| 2017–2018 | Omiya Ardija | 65 | (17) |
| 2019–2023 | Nagoya Grampus | 131 | (31) |
| 2019 | → Yokohama F. Marinos (loan) | 11 | (1) |
| 2023–2025 | Al-Taawoun | 27 | (6) |
| 2025– | Nagoya Grampus | 26 | (5) |
- * Club domestic league appearances and goals as of 12 August 2026

Mateus dos Santos Castro (born 11 September 1994) is a Brazilian footballer who plays for J1 League club Nagoya Grampus.

== Career ==
=== Club ===
On 6 January 2019, Mateus signed for Nagoya Grampus.

On 1 August 2023, Castro joined Saudi Pro League club Al-Taawoun.

On 22 January 2025, Castro returned to Japan and signed for Nagoya Grampus.

== Career statistics ==
As of match played 18 October 2025.

Appearances and goals by club, season and competition
| Club | Season | League | | | State League | | Cup | | League Cup | | Continental | | Other | | Total | |
| Club | Season | Division | Apps | Goals | Apps | Goals | Apps | Goals | Apps | Goals | Apps | Goals | Apps | Goals | Apps | Goals |
|---|---|---|---|---|---|---|---|---|---|---|---|---|---|---|---|---|
| Bahia | 2015 | Série B | 1 | 0 | 2 | 0 | — | | — | | — | | 1 | 0 | 5 | 0 |
| Omiya Ardija (loan) | 2015 | J2 League | 5 | 0 | — | | 2 | 1 | — | | — | | — | | 7 | 1 |
| Omiya Ardija (loan) | 2016 | J1 League | 22 | 2 | — | | 5 | 2 | 8 | 1 | — | | — | | 35 | 5 |
| Omiya Ardija | 2017 | J1 League | 25 | 5 | — | | 2 | 0 | 1 | 1 | — | | — | | 28 | 6 |
| Omiya Ardija | 2018 | J2 League | 40 | 12 | — | | 0 | 0 | — | | — | | 1 | 0 | 41 | 12 |
| Omiya Ardija | Omiya total | | 92 | 19 | — | | 9 | 3 | 9 | 2 | — | | 1 | 0 | 111 | 24 |
| Nagoya Grampus | 2019 | J1 League | 9 | 3 | — | | 1 | 0 | 3 | 1 | — | | — | | 13 | 4 |
| Nagoya Grampus | 2020 | J1 League | 34 | 9 | — | | — | | 4 | 2 | — | | — | | 38 | 11 |
| Nagoya Grampus | 2021 | J1 League | 37 | 7 | — | | 4 | 2 | 5 | 1 | 8 | 4 | — | | 54 | 14 |
| Nagoya Grampus | 2022 | J1 League | 30 | 8 | — | | 3 | 2 | 7 | 3 | — | | — | | 40 | 13 |
| Nagoya Grampus | 2023 | J1 League | 21 | 4 | — | | 3 | 2 | 4 | 0 | — | | — | | 28 | 6 |
| Nagoya Grampus | Total | | 131 | 31 | — | | 11 | 6 | 23 | 7 | 8 | 4 | — | | 173 | 48 |
| Yokohama F. Marinos (loan) | 2019 | J1 League | 11 | 1 | — | | 0 | 0 | 0 | 0 | — | | — | | 11 | 1 |
| Al Taawoun | 2023–24 | Saudi Pro League | 19 | 6 | — | | 2 | 0 | — | | — | | — | | 21 | 6 |
| Al Taawoun | 2024–25 | Saudi Pro League | 8 | 0 | — | | 2 | 0 | — | | 4 | 0 | 0 | 0 | 14 | 0 |
| Al Taawoun | Total | | 27 | 6 | — | | 4 | 0 | — | | 4 | 0 | 0 | 0 | 35 | 6 |
| Nagoya Grampus | 2025 | J1 League | 25 | 5 | — | | 0 | 0 | 1 | 1 | — | | — | | 26 | 6 |
| Nagoya Grampus | 2026 | J1 (100) | 0 | 0 | — | | — | | — | | — | | — | | 0 | 0 |
| Nagoya Grampus | 2026–27 | J1 League | 0 | 0 | — | | 0 | 0 | 0 | 0 | — | | — | | 0 | 0 |
| Nagoya Grampus | Total | | 25 | 5 | — | | 0 | 0 | 1 | 1 | — | | — | | 26 | 6 |
| Career total | | | 287 | 62 | 2 | 0 | 24 | 9 | 33 | 10 | 12 | 4 | 2 | 0 | 361 | 85 |

== Honours ==
=== Club ===
Yokohama F. Marinos

- J1 League: 2019

Nagoya Grampus

- J.League Cup: 2021
