= Akito Fukuta =

Japanese footballer (born 1992)

Personal information
- Date of birth: 1 May 1992 (age 34)
- Place of birth: Mie, Japan
- Height: 1.70 m (5 ft 7 in)
- Position: Defensive midfielder

Team information
- Current team: FC Gifu
- Number: 6

Youth career
- Utsube Rivers FC
- Yokkaichi FC
- Nagoya Grampus
- 2008–2010: Yokkaichi Chuo Kogyo High School

College career
Years	Team	Apps	(Gls)
2011–2014	NIFS Kanoya		

Senior career*
Years	Team	Apps	(Gls)
2013–2019	Sagan Tosu	113	(2)
2020	Shonan Bellmare	5	(0)
2020–2021	Albirex Niigata	40	(1)
2022–2024	Sagan Tosu	84	(5)
2025–	FC Gifu	30	(2)
- * Club domestic league appearances and goals as of 17 August 2026

Akito Fukuta (福田 晃斗, Fukuta Akito; born 1 May 1992) is a Japanese football player who plays for FC Gifu.

== Career ==
Akito made his league debut for Sagan against Sanfrecce Hiroshima on the 28 September 2013. He scored his first goal for the club against Urawa Red Diamonds on the 25 June 2017, scoring in the 90th minute.

Akito made his league debut for Shonan against Urawa Reds on the 21 February 2020.

Akito made his league debut for Albirex against FC Ryukyu on the 23 August 2020. He scored his first goal for the club against Sagamihara on the 22 August 2021, scoring in the 32nd minute.

During his second spell with the club, Akito made his league debut or Sagan against Sanfreece Hiroshima on the 19 February 2022. Akito scored an own goal and his first goal for the club against Nagoya Grampus on the 6 March 2022.

== Club statistics ==
As of match played on 24 February 2019

Appearances and goals by club, season and competition
Club	Season	League			Cup		League Cup		Other		Total	
Club	Season	Division	Apps	Goals	Apps	Goals	Apps	Goals	Apps	Goals	Apps	Goals
Sagan Tosu	2013	J.League Division 1	2	0	0	0	—				2	0
Sagan Tosu	2014	J.League Division 1	2	0	0	0	2	0	—		4	0
Sagan Tosu	2015	J1 League	3	0	0	0	1	0	—		4	0
Sagan Tosu	2016	J1 League	22	0	1	0	4	0	—		27	0
Sagan Tosu	2017	J1 League	29	4	0	0	4	0	—		33	4
Sagan Tosu	2018	J1 League	31	0	4	0	2	0	—		37	0
Career total			89	4	5	0	13	0	0	0	107	4
