= 2019 Nagoya Grampus season =

Nagoya Grampus
2019 season
- Chairman: Toyo Kato
- Manager: Yahiro Kazama (until 23 September); Massimo Ficcadenti (from 23 September)
- J1 League: 13th
- Emperor's Cup: Second Round vs National Institute of Fitness and Sports in Kanoya
- J. League Cup: Quarter-finals vs Kawasaki Frontale
- Top goalscorer: League: Naoki Maeda (8 goals); All: Naoki Maeda; Shuhei Akasaki (9 each)
- Highest home attendance: 42,975 vs Gamba Osaka (20 July 2019)
- Lowest home attendance: 14,651 vs Shonan Bellmare (7 July 2019)
- Average home league attendance: 27,612 (6 December 2019)
Home colours	Away colours

The 2019 Nagoya Grampus season was Nagoya Grampus' second season back in the J1 League following their relegation at the end of the 2016 season, their 26th J1 League season and 36th overall in the Japanese top flight. They were knocked out of the Emperor's Cup in the Second Round by National Institute of Fitness and Sports in Kanoya and reached the Quarterfinal of the J. League Cup where they were knocked out by Kawasaki Frontale.

== Season events ==
On 23 September, Nagoya Grampus announced that Massimo Ficcadenti had replaced Yahiro Kazama as manager.

== Squad ==
As of match played 6 December 2019

No.	Name	Nationality	Position	Date of birth (age)	Signed from	Signed in	Contract ends	Apps.	Goals
Goalkeepers
1	Mitchell Langerak	(Australia)	GK	22 August 1988 (aged 31)	Levante	2018	2019	70	0
16	Yohei Takeda	(Japan)	GK	30 June 1987 (aged 32)	Oita Trinita	2016	2019	38	0
18	Tsubasa Shibuya	(Japan)	GK	27 January 1995 (aged 24)	Yokohama	2017	2019	8	0
Defenders
5	Kazuhiko Chiba	(Japan)	DF	21 June 1985 (aged 34)	Sanfrecce Hiroshima	2019		7	0
6	Kazuya Miyahara	(Japan)	DF	22 March 1996 (aged 23)	Sanfrecce Hiroshima	2019		111	4
17	Yuichi Maruyama	(Japan)	DF	16 June 1989 (aged 30)	FC Tokyo	2018	2019	50	0
20	Shinnosuke Nakatani	(Japan)	DF	24 March 1996 (aged 23)	Kashiwa Reysol	2018	2019	57	1
23	Yutaka Yoshida	(Japan)	DF	17 February 1990 (aged 29)	Sagan Tosu	2019		33	0
34	Haruya Fujii	(Japan)	DF	26 December 2000 (aged 18)	Academy	2018		9	0
36	Kosuke Ota	(Japan)	DF	23 July 1987 (aged 32)	FC Tokyo	2019		14	0
Midfielders
2	Takuji Yonemoto	(Japan)	MF	3 December 1990 (aged 29)	Tokyo	2019		30	0
8	João Schmidt	(Brazil)	MF	19 May 1993 (aged 26)	Atalanta	2019		35	2
9	Ariajasuru Hasegawa	(Japan)	MF	29 October 1988 (aged 31)	Omiya Ardija	2018		62	6
15	Hiroki Ito	(Japan)	DF	12 May 1999 (aged 20)	loan from Júbilo Iwata	2019	2020	9	0
19	Ryota Aoki	(Japan)	MF	6 March 1996 (aged 23)	Academy	2014		56	14
21	Eduardo Neto	(Brazil)	MF	24 October 1988 (aged 31)	Kawasaki Frontale	2018	2019	34	0
26	Koki Sugimori	(Japan)	MF	5 April 1997 (aged 22)	Academy	2014		52	3
28	Daiki Enomoto	(Japan)	MF	21 June 1996 (aged 23)	Academy	2018		11	0
29	Ryuji Izumi	(Japan)	MF	6 November 1993 (aged 26)	Meiji University	2016		134	10
30	Shuto Watanabe	(Japan)	MF		Academy	2019		0	0
33	Shumpei Naruse	(Japan)	MF	17 January 2001 (aged 18)	Academy	2018		8	0
35	Shunto Kodama	(Japan)	MF	3 December 1999 (aged 20)	Academy	2018		10	1
37	Shumpei Fukahori	(Japan)	MF	29 June 1998 (aged 21)	Academy	2016		13	3
	Kota Yamada	(Japan)	MF	10 July 1999 (aged 20)	loan from Yokohama F. Marinos	2019	2019	0	0
Forwards
7	Jô	(Brazil)	FW	20 March 1987 (aged 32)	Corinthians	2018	2019	74	33
10	Gabriel Xavier	(Brazil)	FW	15 July 1993 (aged 26)	Cruzeiro	2018		83	17
13	Yuki Ogaki	(Japan)	FW	28 February 2000 (aged 19)	Academy	2017		3	0
25	Naoki Maeda	(Japan)	FW	17 November 1995 (aged 24)	Matsumoto Yamaga	2018	2019	58	16
32	Shuhei Akasaki	(Japan)	FW	1 September 1991 (aged 28)	loan from Kawasaki Frontale	2019	2019	29	9
Unregistered
46	Ryotaro Ishida	(Japan)	MF	13 December 2001 (aged 17)	Academy	2018		1	0
49	Kudo Hyodo	(Japan)	FW		Academy	2018		1	0
Away on loan
3	Kazuki Kushibiki	(Japan)	DF	12 February 1993 (aged 26)	Consadole Sapporo	2018		74	1
5	Ikki Arai	(Japan)	DF	8 November 1993 (aged 26)	Yokohama F. Marinos	2018		18	1
11	Mateus	(Brazil)	FW	11 September 1994 (aged 25)	Omiya Ardija	2019		13	4
14	Yosuke Akiyama	(Japan)	DF	13 April 1995 (aged 24)	Academy	2017	2019	39	1
24	Yukinari Sugawara	(Japan)	DF	28 June 2000 (aged 19)	Academy	2018		25	0
27	Yuki Soma	(Japan)	MF	25 February 1997 (aged 22)	Academy	2018		33	5
31	Takashi Kanai	(Japan)	DF	5 February 1990 (aged 29)	Yokohama F. Marinos	2018		24	5
	Jonathan Matsuoka	(Paraguay)	FW	27 May 2000 (aged 19)	Academy	2019		0	0
Left during the season
4	Yuki Kobayashi	(Japan)	MF	18 October 1988 (aged 31)	Albirex Niigata	2017		80	2
	Felipe Garcia	(Brazil)	FW	6 November 1990 (aged 29)	Brasil de Pelotas	2017		20	4

=== Out on loan ===
Note: Flags indicate national team as defined under FIFA eligibility rules; some limited exceptions apply. Players may hold more than one non-FIFA nationality.

No.	Pos.	Nation	Player
3	DF	JPN	Kazuki Kushibiki (at Omiya Ardija)
11	FW	BRA	Mateus (at Yokohama F. Marinos)
14	DF	JPN	Yosuke Akiyama (at Júbilo Iwata)
24	DF	JPN	Yukinari Sugawara (at AZ Alkmaar)

No.	Pos.	Nation	Player
27	MF	JPN	Yuki Soma (at Kashima Antlers)
31	MF	JPN	Takashi Kanai (at Sagan Tosu)
—	DF	JPN	Ikki Arai (at JEF United)
—	FW	PAR	Jhonattan Matsuoka (at SC Sagamihara)

== Transfers ==
=== In ===
Date	Position	Nationality	Name	From	Fee	Ref.
18 December 2018	DF	(Japan)	Kazuya Miyahara	Sanfrecce Hiroshima	Undisclosed	
25 December 2018	DF	(Japan)	Kazuhiko Chiba	Sanfrecce Hiroshima	Undisclosed	
28 December 2018	MF	(Brazil)	Gabriel Xavier	Cruzeiro	Undisclosed	
6 January 2019	FW	(Brazil)	Mateus	Omiya Ardija	Undisclosed	
11 January 2019	FW	(Japan)	Takuji Yonemoto	Tokyo	Undisclosed	
13 January 2019	DF	(Japan)	Yutaka Yoshida	Sagan Tosu	Undisclosed	
6 February 2019	MF	(Brazil)	João Schmidt	Atalanta	Undisclosed	
2 July 2019	DF	(Japan)	Kosuke Ota	FC Tokyo	Undisclosed	

=== Out ===
Date	Position	Nationality	Name	To	Fee	Ref.
Winter 2019	FW	(Japan)	Kohei Matsumoto	Maruyasu Okazaki		
15 December 2018	MF	(Japan)	Kanta Kajiyama	SC Sagamihara	Undisclosed	
19 December 2018	FW	(Japan)	Hisato Satō	JEF United Chiba	Undisclosed	
24 December 2018	DF	(Japan)	Ryusuke Sakai	Machida Zelvia	Undisclosed	
26 December 2018	MF	(Japan)	Kenta Uchida	Ventforet Kofu	Undisclosed	
27 December 2018	DF	(Japan)	Hiroto Hatao	Omiya Ardija	Undisclosed	
27 December 2018	MF	(Japan)	Kohei Hattanda	Kagoshima United	Undisclosed	
26 February 2019	FW	(Brazil)	Felipe Garcia	Vitória	Undisclosed	
13 August 2019	MF	(Japan)	Yuki Kobayashi	Oita Trinita	Undisclosed	

=== Loans in ===
Date from	Position	Nationality	Name	From	Date to	Ref.
9 January 2019	DF	(Japan)	Hiroki Ito	Júbilo Iwata	31 January 2020	
12 January 2019	FW	(Japan)	Shuhei Akasaki	Kawasaki Frontale	31 January 2020	
13 August 2019	MF	(Japan)	Kota Yamada	Yokohama F. Marinos	31 January 2020	

=== Loans out ===
Date from	Position	Nationality	Name	To	Date to	Ref.
Winter 2019	FW	(Japan)	Jonathan Matsuoka	SC Sagamihara		
26 December 2018	DF	(Japan)	Ikki Arai	JEF United Chiba	31 January 2020	
24 January 2019	MF	(Japan)	Shumpei Fukahori	Vitória de Guimarães	31 July 2019	
18 June 2019	DF	(Japan)	Yukinari Sugawara	AZ Alkmaar	End of 2019/20 Season	
25 July 2019	DF	(Japan)	Kazuki Kushibiki	Omiya Ardija	31 January 2020	
26 July 2019	DF	(Japan)	Yosuke Akiyama	Júbilo Iwata	31 January 2020	
7 August 2019	MF	(Japan)	Yuki Soma	Kashima Antlers	31 January 2020	
13 August 2019	FW	(Brazil)	Mateus	Yokohama F. Marinos	31 January 2020	
Summer 2019	DF	(Japan)	Takashi Kanai	Sagan Tosu	End of Season	

=== Released ===
Date	Position	Nationality	Name	Joined	Date
8 January 2019	GK	(Japan)	Seigo Narazaki	Retired	8 January 2019

== Friendlies ==
28 January 2019	Chiangrai United	2 – 2	Nagoya Grampus
17:00 JST (UTC+9)		Report

	–
JST (UTC+9)

== Competitions ==
=== J. League ===
==== Results summary ====
Overall								Home						Away					
Pld	W	D	L	GF	GA	GD	Pts	W	D	L	GF	GA	GD	W	D	L	GF	GA	GD
34	9	10	15	45	50	−5	37	7	3	7	22	18	+4	2	7	8	23	32	−9

Last updated: 6 December 2019.
Source: see below

==== Results by round ====
Round	1	2	3	4	5	6	7	8	9	10	11	12	13	14	15	16	17	18	19	20	21	22	23	24	25	26	27	28	29	30	31	32	33	34
Ground	A	H	A	A	H	A	A	H	H	A	H	A	H	A	A	H	A	H	A	H	A	H	A	H	H	A	A	H	A	A	H	H	A	H
Result	W	W	W	L	W	L	D	W	W	D	W	D	L	L	D	L	L	L	L	D	D	W	D	L	L	L	D	D	L	L	W	D	L	L
Position	1	1	1	2	1	3	4	3	2	2	2	2	3	4	5	7	8	9	9	10	10	9	9	9	9	11	11	13	14	14	12	12	12	13

Updated to match(es) played on 6 December 2019. Source: See Below
A = Away; H = Home; W = Win; D = Draw; L = Loss

==== Results ====
23 February 2019 1	Sagan Tosu	0 – 4	Nagoya Grampus	Tosu
14:00 JST (UTC+9)	Torres (yellow card) 36'; Galović (yellow card) 41'	Report	Akasaki (yellow card) 17'; Jô 63', 77'; Yonemoto (yellow card) 65'; Soma 79'; Izumi 89'	Stadium: Tosu Stadium; Attendance: 18,382; Referee: Yudai Yamamoto

2 March 2019 2	Nagoya Grampus	2 – 0	Cerezo Osaka	Nagoya
14:00 JST (UTC+9)	Akasaki 79', 90+2'; Schmidt (yellow card) 86'	Report	Jonjić (yellow card) 90+1'	Stadium: Paloma Mizuho Stadium; Attendance: 19,861; Referee: Yusuke Araki

9 March 2019 3	Gamba Osaka	2 – 3	Nagoya Grampus	Suita
15:00 JST (UTC+9)	Nakatani 36' (o.g.); Ademilson 67' (pen.); Yajima (yellow card) 83'	Report	Akasaki 1'; Schmidt 38'; Fujiharu 87' (o.g.)	Stadium: Panasonic Stadium Suita; Attendance: 26,865; Referee: Yoshiro Imamura

17 March 2019 4	Tokyo	1 – 0	Nagoya Grampus	Tokyo
13:30 JST (UTC+9)	Nagai 54'	Report	Yonemoto (yellow card) 45+3'; Maruyama (yellow card) 69'	Stadium: Ajinomoto Stadium; Attendance: 25,656; Referee: Masaaki Iemoto

30 March 2019 5	Nagoya Grampus	4 – 0	Hokkaido Consadole Sapporo	Toyota
14:00 JST (UTC+9)	Gabriel Xavier 17', 50'; Fukumori 31' (o.g.); Hasegawa 39'	Report	Anderson Lopes (yellow card) 79'	Stadium: Toyota Stadium; Attendance: 31,083; Referee: Akihiko Ikeuchi

5 April 2019 6	Kashima Antlers	2 – 1	Nagoya Grampus	Kashima
19:00 JST (UTC+9)	Doi 72'; Léo Silva 81'	Report	Gabriel Xavier 47'; Yonemoto (yellow card) 74'; Maruyama (yellow card) 77'; Mateus (yellow card) 90+7'	Stadium: Kashima Soccer Stadium; Attendance: 14,163; Referee: Hiroyuki Kimura

13 April 2019 7	Yokohama F. Marinos	1 – 1	Nagoya Grampus	Yokohama
19:00 JST (UTC+9)	Marcos Júnior 20'; Endo (yellow card) 33'; Miyoshi (yellow card) 50'	Report	Jô 8' (pen.); Izumi (yellow card) 45+1'; Yoshida (yellow card) 57'	Stadium: Nissan Stadium; Attendance: 22,667; Referee: Yudai Yamamoto

20 April 2019 8	Nagoya Grampus	1 – 0	Júbilo Iwata	Toyota
14:00 JST (UTC+9)	Schmidt (yellow card) 66'; Jô 70'	Report	Shinzato (yellow card) 63'; Albayrak (yellow card) 68'; Rodrigues (yellow card) 87' (yellow-red card) 90+4'	Stadium: Toyota Stadium; Attendance: 28,585; Referee: Yusuke Araki

28 April 2019 9	Nagoya Grampus	1 – 0	Sanfrecce Hiroshima	Toyota
15:00 JST (UTC+9)	Maeda 38'	Report		Stadium: Toyota Stadium; Attendance: 40,000; Referee: Akihiko Ikeuchi

4 May 2019 10	Shonan Bellmare	1 – 1	Nagoya Grampus	Hiratsuka
16:00 JST (UTC+9)	Yamasaki 45+1' (pen.); Taketomi (yellow card) 64'; Freire (yellow card) 71'	Report	Hasegawa (yellow card) 14'; Schmidt 65'	Stadium: Shonan BMW Stadium Hiratsuka; Attendance: 14,221; Referee: Yoshiro Imamura

12 May 2019 11	Nagoya Grampus	2 – 0	Urawa Red Diamonds	Toyota
15:00 JST (UTC+9)	Mateus 16'; Jô 41'	Report	Kashiwagi (yellow card) 47'; Muto (yellow card) 59'; Ogiwara (yellow card) 89'	Stadium: Toyota Stadium; Attendance: 30,839; Referee: Hiroyuki Kimura

17 May 2019 12	Kawasaki Frontale	1 – 1	Nagoya Grampus	Kawasaki
18:00 JST (UTC+9)	Damião 69'	Report	Mateus 45'; Gabriel Xavier (yellow card) 67'; Miyahara (yellow card) 74'	Stadium: Kawasaki Todoroki Stadium; Attendance: 24,821; Referee: Yuichi Nishimura

26 May 2019 13	Nagoya Grampus	0 – 1	Matsumoto Yamaga	Toyota
15:00 JST (UTC+9)	Akasaki (yellow card) 40'	Report	Sugimoto 16'; Miyasaka (yellow card) 23'; Nagai (yellow card) 71'	Stadium: Toyota Stadium; Attendance: 29,181; Referee: Hirokazu Otsubo

1 June 2019 14	Vegalta Sendai	3 – 1	Nagoya Grampus	Sendai
14:00 JST (UTC+9)	Yoshio 6'; Michibuchi (yellow card) 24'; Nagato (yellow card) 45+3'; Nagasawa 30', 82'	Report	Mateus 27'; Yoshida (yellow card) 62'	Stadium: Yurtec Stadium Sendai; Attendance: 12,853; Referee: Ryuji Sato

15 June 2019 15	Oita Trinita	1 – 1	Nagoya Grampus	Ōita
19:00 JST (UTC+9)	Kozuka (yellow card) 26'; Onaiwu 37'	Report	Miyahara 53'	Stadium: Showa Denko Dome Oita; Attendance: 14,346; Referee: Hiroyuki Kimura

22 June 2019 16	Nagoya Grampus	1 – 2	Shimizu S-Pulse	Nagoya
19:00 JST (UTC+9)	Maeda 90+1'	Report	Futami (yellow card) 3'; Renato (yellow card) 47'; Douglas 68'; Nishizawa 90+5'	Stadium: Paloma Mizuho Stadium; Attendance: 19,501; Referee: Jumpei Iida

30 June 2019 17	Vissel Kobe	5 – 3	Nagoya Grampus	Kobe
18:00 JST (UTC+9)	Villa 27', 80' (pen.); Iniesta 62', 69' (pen.); Ogawa 87'	Report	Izumi 58' (yellow card) 67'; Miyahara 66'; Nakatani 77'; Langerak (yellow card) 79'	Stadium: Noevir Stadium Kobe; Attendance: 22,123; Referee: Yudai Yamamoto

7 July 2019 18	Nagoya Grampus	0 – 2	Shonan Bellmare	Nagoya
18:00 JST (UTC+9)		Report	Saito 5'; Kaneko 82'	Stadium: Paloma Mizuho Stadium; Attendance: 14,651; Referee: Koei Koya

13 July 2019 19	Cerezo Osaka	3 – 0	Nagoya Grampus	Osaka
19:00 JST (UTC+9)	Maruhashi 22' (yellow card) 35'; Kimoto (yellow card) 77'; Takagi 78'; Mendes 90+6'	Report		Stadium: Yanmar Stadium Nagai; Attendance: 16,382; Referee: Takuto Okabe

20 July 2019 20	Nagoya Grampus	2 – 2	Gamba Osaka	Toyota
18:00 JST (UTC+9)	Maeda 4'; Miyahara 44'	Report	Ademilson 8'; Kim (yellow card) 75'; Usami 90+1'; Takao (yellow card) 90+2'	Stadium: Toyota Stadium; Attendance: 42,975; Referee: Yusuke Araki

4 August 2019 21	Urawa Red Diamonds	2 – 2	Nagoya Grampus	Saitama
19:00 JST (UTC+9)	Koroki 45+2'; Sekine 90+3'	Report	Izumi 2'; Maeda 25'	Stadium: Saitama Stadium 2002; Attendance: 37,238; Referee: Masaaki Iemoto

10 August 2019 22	Nagoya Grampus	3 – 0	Kawasaki Frontale	Toyota
19:00 JST (UTC+9)	Izumi 11', 18'; Maeda 64'	Report	Taniguchi (yellow card) 27' (yellow-red card) 80'; Jesiel (yellow card) 85'	Stadium: Toyota Stadium; Attendance: 42,819; Referee: Hiroki Katsumata

18 August 2019 23	Matsumoto Yamaga	1 – 1	Nagoya Grampus	Matsumoto
18:00 JST (UTC+9)	Paulinho (yellow card) 56'; Nagai 80'	Report	Akasaki 90+2'	Stadium: Sunpro Alwin; Attendance: 18,311; Referee: Yuichi Nishimura

24 August 2019 24	Nagoya Grampus	1 – 5	Yokohama F. Marinos	Nagoya
18:00 JST (UTC+9)	Miyahara (red card) 57'; Jô 70' (yellow card) 90+3'	Report	Marcos Júnior 3' (pen.), 60' (pen.); Erik 39'; Endo 78', 84'; Ogihara (yellow card) 90'	Stadium: Paloma Mizuho Stadium; Attendance: 20,130; Referee: Jumpei Iida

30 August 2019 25	Nagoya Grampus	1 – 2	Tokyo	Nagoya
19:30 JST (UTC+9)	Maruyama (yellow card) 39'; Akasaki (yellow card) 77'; Maeda 83'; Nakatani (yellow card) 87'	Report	Oliveira (penalty missed) 29' (yellow card) 88'; Takahagi 49'; Oh (yellow card) 71'	Stadium: Paloma Mizuho Stadium; Attendance: 20,188; Referee: Hiroyuki Kimura

13 September 2019 26	Shimizu S-Pulse	3 – 2	Nagoya Grampus	Shizuoka
19:30 JST (UTC+9)	Nishizawa 25', 59'; Kawai 54'	Report	Miyahara 14'; Hasegawa 74'	Stadium: IAI Stadium Nihondaira; Attendance: 15,019; Referee: Masaaki Iemoto

28 September 2019 27	Sanfrecce Hiroshima	1 – 1	Nagoya Grampus	Hiroshima
19:00 JST (UTC+9)	Nogami 33'	Report	Maeda 44'; Izumi (yellow card) 57'	Stadium: Edion Stadium Hiroshima; Attendance: 10,880; Referee: Minoru Tojo

5 October 2019 28	Nagoya Grampus	1 – 1	Oita Trinita	Nagoya
14:00 JST (UTC+9)	Akasaki 90+1'	Report	Mitsuhira 52'	Stadium: Paloma Mizuho Stadium; Attendance: 17,648; Referee: Yusuke Araki

19 October 2019 29	Nagoya Grampus	0 – 2	Vegalta Sendai	Nagoya
14:00 JST (UTC+9)	Gabriel Xavier (yellow card) 33'; Akasaki (yellow card) 79'	Report	Hiraoka 7'; Lopes 85' (pen.)	Stadium: Paloma Mizuho Stadium; Attendance: 15,485; Referee: Hajime Matsuo

2 November 2019 30	Hokkaido Consadole Sapporo	3 – 0	Nagoya Grampus	Sapporo
14:00 JST (UTC+9)	Arano (yellow card) 19'; Fukai 35'; Suzuki 71' (pen.); Songkrasin (yellow card) 80'; Fernandes 86'	Report	Yoshida (red card) 69'	Stadium: Sapporo Dome; Attendance: 19,943; Referee: Ryosuke Yamaoka

9 November 2019 31	Nagoya Grampus	3 – 0	Vissel Kobe	Toyota
14:00 JST (UTC+9)	Maeda 12'; Izumi 23'; Hasegawa (yellow card) 49'; Dankler 54' (o.g.); Schmidt (yellow card) 81'	Report		Stadium: Toyota Stadium; Attendance: 37,194; Referee: Masaaki Iemoto

23 November 2019 32	Nagoya Grampus	0 – 0	Sagan Tosu	Toyota
14:00 JST (UTC+9)	Izumi (yellow card) 12'; Schmidt (yellow card) 78'	Report	Kanazaki (penalty missed) 14'; Takahashi (yellow card) 90+1'	Stadium: Toyota Stadium; Attendance: 26,124; Referee: Ryuji Sato

30 November 2019 33	Júbilo Iwata	2 – 1	Nagoya Grampus	Iwata
14:00 JST (UTC+9)	Matsumoto 22'; Ōkubo 71'; Ebecilio (yellow card) 90'	Report	Hasegawa 39'; Gabriel Xavier (yellow card) 84'	Stadium: Yamaha Stadium; Attendance: 14,963; Referee: Hiroyoshi Takayama

7 December 2019 34	Nagoya Grampus	0 – 1	Kashima Antlers	Toyota
14:00 JST (UTC+9)	Ito (yellow card) 89'	Report	Machida (yellow card) 38'; Nakatani 43' (o.g.)	Stadium: Toyota Stadium; Attendance: 33,133; Referee: Hajime Matsuo

==== League table ====
Pos	Team	Pld	W	D	L	GF	GA	GD	Pts	Qualification or relegation
1	Yokohama F. Marinos (C)	34	22	4	8	68	38	+30	70	Qualification for the Champions League group stage
2	FC Tokyo	34	19	7	8	46	29	+17	64	Qualification for the Champions League play-off round
3	Kashima Antlers	34	18	9	7	54	30	+24	63	Qualification for the Champions League play-off round
4	Kawasaki Frontale	34	16	12	6	57	34	+23	60	
5	Cerezo Osaka	34	18	5	11	39	25	+14	59	
6	Sanfrecce Hiroshima	34	15	10	9	45	29	+16	55	
7	Gamba Osaka	34	12	11	11	54	48	+6	47	
8	Vissel Kobe	34	14	5	15	61	59	+2	47	Qualification for the Champions League group stage (Note: Vissel Kobe qualified for the 2020 AFC Champions League group stage as 2019 Emperor's Cup winners.)
9	Oita Trinita	34	12	11	11	35	35	0	47	
10	Hokkaido Consadole Sapporo	34	13	7	14	54	49	+5	46	
11	Vegalta Sendai	34	12	5	17	38	45	−7	41	
12	Shimizu S-Pulse	34	11	6	17	45	69	−24	39	
13	Nagoya Grampus	34	9	10	15	45	50	−5	37	
14	Urawa Red Diamonds	34	9	10	15	34	50	−16	37	
15	Sagan Tosu	34	10	6	18	32	53	−21	36	
16	Shonan Bellmare (O)	34	10	6	18	40	63	−23	36	Qualification for the Relegation play-off
17	Matsumoto Yamaga (R)	34	6	13	15	21	40	−19	31	Relegation to J2 League
18	Júbilo Iwata (R)	34	8	7	19	29	51	−22	31	Relegation to J2 League

Source: Meiji Yasuda J1 League
Rules for classification: 1) Points; 2) Goal difference; 3) Goals scored.
(C) Champions; (O) Play-off winners; (R) Relegated

=== J. League Cup ===
==== Group stage ====
Pos	Team	Pld	W	D	L	GF	GA	GD	Pts
1	Cerezo Osaka	6	3	2	1	9	4	+5	11
2	Nagoya Grampus	6	2	3	1	11	11	0	9
3	Oita Trinita	6	2	1	3	7	10	−3	7
4	Vissel Kobe	6	1	2	3	6	8	−2	5

Source: League table, Match results

6 March 2019 1	Nagoya Grampus	2 – 2	Vissel Kobe	Nagoya
19:00 JST (UTC+9)	Kushibiki (yellow card) 45+1'; Soma 80' (pen.), 90+1'	Report	Wellington 57', 90+5'; Watanabe (yellow card) 75'; Hashimoto (yellow card) 79'	Stadium: Paloma Mizuho Stadium; Attendance: 13,570; Referee: Koichiro Fukushima

13 March 2019 2	Nagoya Grampus	2 – 1	Oita Trinita	Nagoya
19:00 JST (UTC+9)	Soma 4'; Hasegawa 41'	Report	Ito 43'	Stadium: Paloma Mizuho Stadium; Attendance: 10,156; Referee: Nobutsugu Murakami

10 April 2019 3	Cerezo Osaka	3 – 0	Nagoya Grampus	Osaka
19:30 JST (UTC+9)	Mizunuma 10', 15'; Fukumitsu 82'	Report	Kobayashi (yellow card) 45+1'	Stadium: Yanmar Stadium Nagai; Attendance: 5,728; Referee: Hajime Matsuo

24 April 2019 4	Oita Trinita	2 – 2	Nagoya Grampus	Ōita
19:00 JST (UTC+9)	Mitsuhira 44'; Goto 48'; Kozuka (yellow card) 88'	Report	Chiba (yellow card) 15' (yellow-red card) 53'; Kanai 24'; Akasaki 83'	Stadium: Showa Denko Dome Oita; Attendance: 4,322; Referee: Minoru Tojo

8 May 2019 5	Nagoya Grampus	2 – 2	Cerezo Osaka	Nagoya
19:30 JST (UTC+9)	Kushibiki (yellow card) 13'; Maeda 69'; Jô 79'	Report	Katayama 15'; Funaki 40'	Stadium: Paloma Mizuho Stadium; Attendance: 9,852; Referee: Hiroki Kasahara

22 May 2019 6	Vissel Kobe	1 – 3	Nagoya Grampus	Kobe
19:00 JST (UTC+9)	Miya (yellow card) 9'; Wellington 63'; Samper (yellow card) 63'	Report	Yoshida (yellow card) 44'; Hasegawa (yellow card) 45+1' (goal) 71'; Akasaki 46', 81'	Stadium: Noevir Stadium Kobe; Attendance: 5,835; Referee: Hajime Matsuo

==== Knockout stage ====
19 June 2019 Playoff Round 1st leg	Nagoya Grampus	2 – 0	Vegalta Sendai	Nagoya
19:00 JST (UTC+9)	Akasaki 17'; Mateus 72'	Report		Stadium: Paloma Mizuho Stadium; Attendance: 6,405; Referee: Yuichi Nishimura

26 June 2019 Playoff Round 2nd leg	Vegalta Sendai	1 – 0 (1 – 2 agg.)	Nagoya Grampus	Sendai
19:00 JST (UTC+9)	Michibuchi 85'; Nagasawa (yellow card) 90+1'	Report	Kushibiki (yellow card) 68'	Stadium: Yurtec Stadium Sendai; Attendance: 5,963; Referee: Koichiro Fukushima

4 September 2019 Quarterfinal 1st leg	Kawasaki Frontale	2 – 0	Nagoya Grampus	Kawasaki
19:00 JST (UTC+9)	Chinen 15'; Wakizaka 61'	Report	Miyahara (yellow card) 13'; Schmidt (yellow card) 43'	Stadium: Kawasaki Todoroki Stadium; Attendance: 14,719; Referee: Nobutsugu Murakami

8 September 2019 Quarterfinal 2nd leg	Nagoya Grampus	2 – 2 (2 – 4 agg.)	Kawasaki Frontale	Nagoya
18:00 JST (UTC+9)	Neto (yellow card) 41'; Hasegawa 73'; Jô 89'	Report	Shimoda 53'; Damião 81'	Stadium: Paloma Mizuho Stadium; Attendance: 11,587; Referee: Hajime Matsuo

=== Emperor's Cup ===
3 July 2019 Second Round	Nagoya Grampus	0 – 3	National Institute of Fitness and Sports in Kanoya	Nagoya
19:00 JST (UTC+9)		Report	I.Ryusei 46'; A.Nemoto 67'; I.Fujimoto 81'	Stadium: Paloma Mizuho Stadium; Attendance: 2,462; Referee: Akihiko Ikeuchi

== Squad statistics ==
As of match played 6 December 2019

=== Appearances and goals ===
No.	Pos	Nat	Player	Total		J-League		Emperor's Cup		J-League Cup	
No.	Pos	Nat	Player	Apps	Goals	Apps	Goals	Apps	Goals	Apps	Goals
1	GK	(Australia) AUS	Mitchell Langerak	35	0	33	0	0	0	2	0
2	MF	(Japan) JPN	Takuji Yonemoto	30	0	26+2	0	0	0	2	0
3	DF	(Japan) JPN	Kazuki Kushibiki	9	0	0+1	0	1	0	5+2	0
5	DF	(Japan) JPN	Kazuhiko Chiba	7	0	0+1	0	1	0	5	0
6	DF	(Japan) JPN	Kazuya Miyahara	37	4	30+1	4	0+1	0	4+1	0
7	FW	(Brazil) BRA	Jô	37	8	32	6	0	0	2+3	2
8	MF	(Brazil) BRA	João Schmidt	35	2	30+2	2	0	0	2+1	0
9	MF	(Japan) JPN	Ariajasuru Hasegawa	37	6	21+9	3	0	0	5+2	3
10	FW	(Brazil) BRA	Gabriel Xavier	35	3	26+6	3	0	0	2+1	0
13	FW	(Japan) JPN	Yuki Ogaki	1	0	0	0	0	0	0+1	0
14	DF	(Japan) JPN	Yosuke Akiyama	3	0	0	0	1	0	1+1	0
15	MF	(Japan) JPN	Hiroki Ito	9	0	0+2	0	0+1	0	6	0
16	GK	(Japan) JPN	Yohei Takeda	12	0	1+2	0	1	0	8	0
17	DF	(Japan) JPN	Yuichi Maruyama	32	0	28	0	0	0	4	0
20	DF	(Japan) JPN	Shinnosuke Nakatani	39	1	34	1	0	0	4+1	0
21	MF	(Brazil) BRA	Eduardo Neto	19	0	14+2	0	0	0	3	0
23	DF	(Japan) JPN	Yutaka Yoshida	33	0	29+1	0	1	0	2	0
24	DF	(Japan) JPN	Yukinari Sugawara	6	0	0	0	0	0	6	0
25	MF	(Japan) JPN	Naoki Maeda	40	9	19+10	8	0+1	0	9+1	1
26	FW	(Japan) JPN	Koki Sugimori	11	0	0+3	0	1	0	6+1	0
27	MF	(Japan) JPN	Yuki Soma	25	4	1+16	1	1	0	5+2	3
28	MF	(Japan) JPN	Daiki Enomoto	8	0	0+2	0	0	0	1+5	0
29	DF	(Japan) JPN	Ryuji Izumi	37	6	26+5	6	0	0	4+2	0
32	FW	(Japan) JPN	Shuhei Akasaki	29	9	5+16	5	1	0	5+2	4
33	MF	(Japan) JPN	Shumpei Naruse	2	0	1	0	0	0	1	0
34	DF	(Japan) JPN	Haruya Fujii	6	0	4	0	0	0	1+1	0
35	MF	(Japan) JPN	Shunto Kodama	1	0	0	0	0	0	1	0
36	DF	(Japan) JPN	Kosuke Ota	14	0	9+3	0	0	0	0+2	0
37	MF	(Japan) JPN	Shumpei Fukahori	2	0	0+2	0	0	0	0	0
Players away on loan:
11	FW	(Brazil) BRA	Mateus	13	4	5+4	3	1	0	3	1
31	DF	(Japan) JPN	Takashi Kanai	9	1	0+3	0	1	0	5	1
Players who left Nagoya Grampus during the season:
4	MF	(Japan) JPN	Yuki Kobayashi	12	0	0+4	0	1	0	6+1	0

=== Goal Scorers ===
Place	Position	Nation	Number	Name	J-League	Emperor's Cup	J-League Cup	Total
1	MF	(Japan)	25	Naoki Maeda	8	0	1	9
1	FW	(Japan)	32	Shuhei Akasaki	5	0	4	9
3	FW	(Brazil)	7	Jô	6	0	2	8
4	DF	(Japan)	29	Ryuji Izumi	6	0	0	6
4	MF	(Japan)	9	Aria Jasour Hasegawa	3	0	3	6
6	DF	(Japan)	6	Kazuya Miyahara	4	0	0	4
6	MF	(Japan)	27	Yuki Soma	1	0	3	4
6	FW	(Brazil)	11	Mateus	3	0	1	4
9	FW	(Brazil)	10	Gabriel Xavier	3	0	0	3
9				Own goal	3	0	0	3
11	MF	(Brazil)	8	João Schmidt	2	0	0	2
12	DF	(Japan)	20	Shinnosuke Nakatani	1	0	0	1
12	DF	(Japan)	31	Takashi Kanai	0	0	1	1
				TOTALS	45	0	15	60

=== Disciplinary record ===
Number	Nation	Position	Name	J-League		J. League Cup		Emperor's Cup		Total	
Number	Nation	Position	Name	Booked	Sent off (straight red)	Booked	Sent off (straight red)	Booked	Sent off (straight red)	Booked	Sent off (straight red)
1	(Australia)	GK	Mitchell Langerak	1	0	0	0	0	0	1	0
2	(Japan)	MF	Takuji Yonemoto	3	0	0	0	0	0	3	0
3	(Japan)	DF	Kazuki Kushibiki	0	0	0	0	3	0	3	0
5	(Japan)	DF	Kazuhiko Chiba	0	0	0	0	2	1	2	1
6	(Japan)	DF	Kazuya Miyahara	1	1	0	0	1	0	2	1
7	(Brazil)	FW	Jô	1	0	0	0	0	0	1	0
8	(Brazil)	MF	João Schmidt	4	0	0	0	1	0	5	0
9	(Japan)	MF	Aria Jasour Hasegawa	2	0	0	0	1	0	3	0
10	(Brazil)	FW	Gabriel Xavier	3	0	0	0	0	0	3	0
15	(Japan)	DF	Hiroki Ito	1	0	0	0	0	0	1	0
17	(Japan)	DF	Yuichi Maruyama	3	0	0	0	0	0	3	0
20	(Japan)	DF	Shinnosuke Nakatani	1	0	0	0	0	0	1	0
21	(Brazil)	MF	Eduardo Neto	0	0	0	0	1	0	1	0
23	(Japan)	DF	Yutaka Yoshida	2	1	0	0	1	0	3	1
29	(Japan)	DF	Ryuji Izumi	4	0	0	0	0	0	4	0
32	(Japan)	FW	Shuhei Akasaki	4	0	0	0	0	0	4	0
Players away on loan:
11	(Brazil)	FW	Mateus	1	0	0	0	0	0	1	0
Players who left Nagoya Grampus during the season:
4	(Japan)	MF	Yuki Kobayashi	0	0	0	0	1	0	1	0
			TOTALS	31	2	2	0	11	1	42	3
