= 2018 Nagoya Grampus season =

Nagoya Grampus
2018 season
- Chairman: Toyo Kato
- Manager: Yahiro Kazama
- J1 League: 15th
- Emperor's Cup: Group stage
- J. League Cup: Third Round vs Sanfrecce Hiroshima
- Top goalscorer: League: Jô (24 goals); All: Jô (25 goals)
Home colours	Away colours

The 2018 Nagoya Grampus season was Nagoya Grampus' first season back in the J1 League following their relegation at the end of the 2016 season, their 25th J1 League season and 35th overall in the Japanese top flight. They also took part in the Emperor's Cup and the J. League Cup.

== Squad ==
As of match played 1 December 2018

No.	Name	Nationality	Position	Date of birth (age)	Signed from	Signed in	Contract ends	Apps.	Goals
Goalkeepers
1	Seigo Narazaki	(Japan)	GK	15 April 1976 (aged 42)	Yokohama Flügels	1999		660	0
16	Yohei Takeda	(Japan)	GK	30 June 1987 (aged 31)	Oita Trinita	2016		26	0
18	Tsubasa Shibuya	(Japan)	GK	27 January 1995 (aged 23)	Yokohama	2017		8	0
22	Mitchell Langerak	(Australia)	GK	22 August 1988 (aged 30)	Levante	2018		35	0
Defenders
3	Kazuki Kushibiki	(Japan)	DF	12 February 1993 (aged 25)	Consadole Sapporo	2018		65	1
5	Ikki Arai	(Japan)	DF	8 November 1993 (aged 25)	Yokohama F. Marinos	2018		18	1
6	Kazuya Miyahara	(Japan)	DF	22 March 1996 (aged 22)	loan from Sanfrecce Hiroshima	2018		74	0
17	Yuichi Maruyama	(Japan)	DF	16 June 1989 (aged 29)	FC Tokyo	2018		18	0
20	Shinnosuke Nakatani	(Japan)	DF	24 March 1996 (aged 22)	Kashiwa Reysol	2018		18	0
31	Takashi Kanai	(Japan)	DF	5 February 1990 (aged 28)	Yokohama F. Marinos	2018		15	4
36	Willian Rocha	(Brazil)	DF	1 April 1989 (aged 29)	loan from Guarani	2018		8	3
39	Kenta Uchida	(Japan)	DF	2 October 1989 (aged 29)	Ehime	2018		33	3
41	Yukinari Sugawara	(Japan)	DF	28 June 2000 (aged 18)	Academy	2018		19	0
43	Haruya Fujii	(Japan)	DF	26 December 2000 (aged 17)	Academy	2018		3	0
Midfielders
4	Yuki Kobayashi	(Japan)	MF	18 October 1988 (aged 30)	Albirex Niigata	2017		67	2
9	Ariajasuru Hasegawa	(Japan)	MF	29 October 1988 (aged 30)	Omiya Ardija	2018		25	0
10	Gabriel Xavier	(Brazil)	MF	15 July 1993 (aged 25)	loan from Cruzeiro	2017		48	14
14	Yosuke Akiyama	(Japan)	MF	13 April 1995 (aged 23)	Academy	2017		36	1
15	Eduardo Neto	(Brazil)	MF	24 October 1988 (aged 30)	Kawasaki Frontale	2018		15	0
21	Kohei Hattanda	(Japan)	MF	8 January 1990 (aged 28)	Shimizu S-Pulse	2017		32	0
23	Ryota Aoki	(Japan)	MF	6 March 1996 (aged 22)	Academy	2014		56	14
25	Naoki Maeda	(Japan)	MF	17 November 1995 (aged 23)	Matsumoto Yamaga	2018		18	7
29	Ryuji Izumi	(Japan)	MF	6 November 1993 (aged 25)	Meiji University	2016		97	4
32	Shumpei Fukahori	(Japan)	MF	29 June 1998 (aged 20)	Academy	2016		11	3
38	Shunto Kodama	(Japan)	MF	3 December 1999 (aged 18)	Academy	2018		9	1
44	Shumpei Naruse	(Japan)	MF	17 January 2001 (aged 17)	Academy	2018		6	0
46	Ryotaro Ishida	(Japan)	MF	13 December 2001 (aged 16)	Academy	2018		1	0
47	Yuki Soma	(Japan)	MF	25 February 1997 (aged 21)	Academy	2018		9	1
Forwards
7	Jô	(Brazil)	FW	20 March 1987 (aged 31)	Corinthians	2018		37	25
11	Hisato Satō	(Japan)	FW	12 March 1982 (aged 36)	Sanfrecce Hiroshima	2017		47	7
13	Yuki Ogaki	(Japan)	FW	28 February 2000 (aged 18)	Academy	2017		2	0
28	Keiji Tamada	(Japan)	FW	11 April 1980 (aged 38)	Cerezo Osaka	2017		350	89
37	Daiki Enomoto	(Japan)	FW	21 June 1996 (aged 22)	Academy	2018		3	0
49	Kudo Hyodo	(Japan)	FW		Academy	2018		1	0
Away on loan
2	Hiroto Hatao	(Japan)	DF	16 September 1990 (aged 28)	Ventforet Kofu	2018		6	1
30	Kohei Matsumoto	(Japan)	FW	31 July 1994 (aged 24)	Academy	2017		0	0
33	Kanta Kajiyama	(Japan)	MF	24 April 1998 (aged 20)	Academy	2016		3	0
Left during the season
8	Washington	(Brazil)	MF	16 November 1986 (aged 32)	Brasil de Pelotas	2017		45	2
19	Yuki Oshitani	(Japan)	FW	23 September 1989 (aged 29)	Fagiano Okayama	2017		31	2
37	Lim Seung-gyeom	(South Korea)	FW	26 April 1995 (aged 23)		2017		14	1

=== Out on loan ===
Note: Flags indicate national team as defined under FIFA eligibility rules; some limited exceptions apply. Players may hold more than one non-FIFA nationality.

No.	Pos.	Nation	Player
27	FW	JPN	Koki Sugimori (at Machida Zelvia)
30	FW	JPN	Kohei Matsumoto (at SC Sagamihara)
33	MF	JPN	Kanta Kajiyama (at SC Sagamihara)

No.	Pos.	Nation	Player
36	DF	JPN	Ryusuke Sakai (at Machida Zelvia)
—	FW	BRA	Felipe Garcia (at Goiás)

== Transfers ==
=== In ===
Date	Position	Nationality	Name	From	Fee	Ref.
19 December 2017	DF	(Japan)	Kazuki Kushibiki	Consadole Sapporo	Undisclosed	
26 December 2017	DF	(Japan)	Ikki Arai	Yokohama F. Marinos	Undisclosed	
27 December 2017	MF	(Japan)	Ariajasuru Hasegawa	Omiya Ardija	Undisclosed	
3 January 2018	FW	(Brazil)	Jô	Corinthians	Undisclosed	
5 January 2018	DF	(Japan)	Hiroto Hatao	Ventforet Kofu	Undisclosed	
14 January 2018	GK	(Australia)	Mitchell Langerak	Levante	Undisclosed	
20 June 2018	DF	(Japan)	Shinnosuke Nakatani	Kashiwa Reysol	Undisclosed	
29 June 2018	MF	(Brazil)	Eduardo Neto	Kawasaki Frontale	Undisclosed	
4 July 2018	DF	(Japan)	Yuichi Maruyama	FC Tokyo	Undisclosed	
19 July 2018	MF	(Japan)	Naoki Maeda	Matsumoto Yamaga	Undisclosed	
25 July 2018	DF	(Japan)	Takashi Kanai	Yokohama F. Marinos	Undisclosed	

=== Out ===
Date	Position	Nationality	Name	To	Fee	Ref.
4 January 2018	MF	(Japan)	Taishi Taguchi	Jubilo Iwata	Undisclosed	
10 January 2018	FW	(Sweden)	Robin Simović	Omiya Ardija	Undisclosed	
12 July 2018	FW	(South Korea)	Lim Seung-gyeom	Mokpo City	Undisclosed	
19 July 2018	FW	(Japan)	Yuki Oshitani	Tokushima Vortis	Undisclosed	
	GK	(Japan)	Kota Ogi	Vissel Kobe	Undisclosed	
	DF	(Japan)	Shota Kobayashi	Vegalta Sendai	Undisclosed	
	DF	(Japan)	Ryo Takahashi	Shonan Bellmare	Undisclosed	
	MF	(Japan)	Ryota Tanabe	Tokyo United	Undisclosed	
	MF	(Japan)	Asahi Yada	JEF United Chiba	Undisclosed	
	FW	(Japan)	Ryo Nagai	Matsumoto Yamaga	Undisclosed	
	FW	(Japan)	Ryuji Sugimoto	Tokushima Vortis	Undisclosed	

=== Loans in ===
Date from	Position	Nationality	Name	From	Date to	Ref.
26 December 2017	MF	(Brazil)	Gabriel Xavier	Cruzeiro	End of Season	
30 December 2017	DF	(Japan)	Kazuya Miyahara	Sanfrecce Hiroshima	End of Season	
14 February 2018	DF	(Brazil)	Willian Rocha	Guarani	End of Season	

=== Loans out ===
Date from	Position	Nationality	Name	To	Date to	Ref.
30 January 2018	MF	(Brazil)	Felipe Garcia	Goiás	End of Season	
19 July 2018	DF	(Japan)	Hiroto Hatao	Omiya Ardija	31 January 2018	
31 July 2018	DF	(Japan)	Kenta Uchida	Montedio Yamagata	31 January 2018	
5 September 2018	MF	(Japan)	Kanta Kajiyama	SC Sagamihara	End of Season	
	DF	(Japan)	Ryusuke Sakai	Machida Zelvia	End of Season	
	FW	(Japan)	Koki Sugimori	Machida Zelvia	End of Season	
	FW	(South Korea)	Lim Seung-gyeom	Oita Trinita	12 July 2018	

=== Released ===
Date	Position	Nationality	Name	Joined	Date
29 June 2018	MF	(Brazil)	Washington	Renofa Yamaguchi	27 July 2018
6 December 2018	FW	(Japan)	Keiji Tamada	V-Varen Nagasaki	28 December 2018

== Friendlies ==
27 January 2018	Nagoya Grampus (Japan)	2–1	(Thailand) Lampang	Chiang Mai, Thailand
15:00 JST (UTC+9)	Jô; Oshitani	Report	Goal	Stadium: Alpine Golf Resort

29 January 2018	Nagoya Grampus (Japan)	4–1	(Thailand) Lamphun Warrior	Chiang Mai, Thailand
15:00 JST (UTC+9)	Tamada; Fukahori; Aoki; Jô	Report	Goal	Stadium: Alpine Golf Resort

31 January 2018	Nagoya Grampus (Japan)	4–2	(Thailand) Chiangmai	Chiang Mai, Thailand
15:00 JST (UTC+9)	Gabriel Xavier; Ryota Aoki; Jô; K.Kajiyama	Report	Goal	Stadium: Alpine Golf Resort

5 February 2018	Nagoya Grampus	2–7	Ryukyu	Minami
13:00 JST (UTC+9)	Satō; Tamada	Report	Goal	Stadium: Golden Forest Park Athletics Stadium

7 February 2018	Nagoya Grampus	4–4	Urawa Red Diamonds	Minami
13:00 JST (UTC+9)	Jô; Izumi; Oshitani	Report	Goal	Stadium: Golden Forest Park Athletics Stadium

10 February 2018	Nagoya Grampus	1–1	Tokyo	Minami
11:00 JST (UTC+9)	Uchida	Report	Goal	Stadium: Golden Forest Park Athletics Stadium

== Competitions ==
=== J. League ===
==== Results summary ====
Overall								Home						Away					
Pld	W	D	L	GF	GA	GD	Pts	W	D	L	GF	GA	GD	W	D	L	GF	GA	GD
34	12	5	17	51	58	−7	41	5	4	8	28	27	+1	7	1	9	23	31	−8

Last updated: 1 December 2018.
Source: see below

==== Results by round ====
Round	1	2	3	4	5	6	7	8	9	10	11	12	13	14	15	16	17	18	19	20	21	22	23	24	25	26	27	28	29	30	31	32	33	34
Ground	A	H	A	H	A	A	H	A	A	H	A	H	H	A	H	A	H	A	H	H	A	H	H	A	H	A	H	A	H	H	A	A	A	H
Result	W	W	D	L	L	L	L	L	L	L	L	D	D	L	L	L	D	W	W	W	W	W	W	W	L	L	L	W	L	L	W	L	W	D
Position	2	1	3	5	8	15	16	17	18	18	18	18	18	18	18	18	18	18	18	18	16	14	13	11	12	14	16	14	14	15	15	16	16	15

Updated to match(es) played on 1 December 2018. Source: See Below
A = Away; H = Home; W = Win; D = Draw; L = Loss

==== Results ====
24 February 2018 1	Gamba Osaka	2–3	Nagoya Grampus	Suita
14:30 JST (UTC+9)	Endō 13'; Nagasawa 79'	Report	Gabriel Xavier 26'; Rocha 51'; Kobayashi (yellow card) 66'; Jô 84'	Stadium: Panasonic Stadium Suita; Attendance: 28,681; Referee: Takuto Okabe

3 March 2018 2	Nagoya Grampus	1–0	Júbilo Iwata	Toyota
14:00 JST (UTC+9)	Gabriel Xavier 8'	Report	Musaev (yellow card) 26'; Sakurauchi (yellow card) 35'	Stadium: Toyota Stadium; Attendance: 38,916; Referee: Ryuji Sato

11 March 2018 3	Shonan Bellmare	1–1	Nagoya Grampus	Hiratsuka
16:00 JST (UTC+9)	Ishikawa (yellow card) 34'; Kikuchi (yellow card) 67'	Report	Kobayashi (yellow card) 33'	Stadium: Shonan BMW Stadium Hiratsuka; Attendance: 12,465; Referee: Minoru Tojo

18 March 2018 4	Nagoya Grampus	0–1	Kawasaki Frontale	Toyota
19:00 JST (UTC+9)		Report	Ōkubo 65'	Stadium: Toyota Stadium

31 March 2018 5	Sagan Tosu	3–2	Nagoya Grampus	Tosu
19:00 JST (UTC+9)	Yoshida (yellow card) 32'; Takahashi 74'; Ibarbo 77'; Tagawa 90+3'	Report	Jô (penalty missed) 12'; Gabriel Xavier 14', 69'; Kushibiki (yellow card) 43'; Akiyama (yellow card) 85'	Stadium: Tosu Stadium; Attendance: 12,957; Referee: Yudai Yamamoto

7 April 2018 6	Hokkaido Consadole Sapporo	3–0	Nagooya Grampus	Sapporo
14:00 JST (UTC+9)	Shindo 26'; Tokura 69'; Fukumori (yellow card) 71'; Kushibiki 73' (o.g.)	Report	Washington (yellow card) 81'	Stadium: Sapporo Dome; Attendance: 17,390; Referee: Akihiko Ikeuchi

11 April 2018 7	Nagoya Grampus	2–3	Vegalta Sendai	Nagoya
19:00 JST (UTC+9)	Kushibiki (yellow card) 26'; Jô 53', 89' (pen.) (yellow card) 77'; Washington (yellow card) 74'; Hasegawa (yellow card) 90+5'	Report	Ishihara 23'; Nishimura 37', 68'; Oiwa (red card) 88'	Stadium: Paloma Mizuho Stadium; Attendance: 9,297; Referee: Takuto Okabe

14 April 2018 8	Kashima Antlers	2–0	Nagoya Grampus	Kashima
14:00 JST (UTC+9)	Akiyama 10' (o.g.); Ogasawara (yellow card) 35'; Uchida (yellow card) 61'; Kanazaki 88'	Report	Washington (yellow card) 28'; Kushibiki (yellow card) 54'	Stadium: Kashima Soccer Stadium; Attendance: 17,921; Referee: Jumpei Iida

21 April 2018 9	Vissel Kobe	3–0	Nagoya Grampus	Kobe
16:00 JST (UTC+9)	Jung 12'; Podolski 51', 81'	Report	Washington (yellow card) 30'; Gabriel Xavier (yellow card) 35'; Kobayashi (yellow card) 51'; Hasegawa (yellow card) 90+4'	Stadium: Noevir Stadium Kobe; Attendance: 18,681; Referee: Masuya Ueda

25 April 2018 10	Nagoya Grampus	1–3	Shimizu S-Pulse	Nagoya
19:00 JST (UTC+9)	Rocha 82'	Report	Kitagawa 44'; Ishige 70'; Kaneko 86'	Stadium: Paloma Mizuho Stadium; Attendance: 9,774; Referee: Yuichi Nishimura

28 April 2018 11	Tokyo	3–2	Nagoya Grampus	Tokyo
15:00 JST (UTC+9)	Oliveira 20' (pen.), 46'; Nagai 38'	Report	Gabriel Xavier (yellow card) 28'; Jô 32' (yellow card) 60'; Rocha 63'	Stadium: Ajinomoto Stadium; Attendance: 25,185; Referee: Koichito Fukushima

2 May 2018 12	Nagoya Grampus	0–0	Cerezo Osaka	Nagoya
19:00 JST (UTC+9)	Hasegawa (yellow card) 64' (yellow-red card) 85'	Report		Stadium: Paloma Mizuho Stadium; Attendance: 13,220; Referee: Toru Kakinuma

5 May 2018 13	Nagoya Grampus	1–1	Yokohama F. Marinos	Toyota
19:00 JST (UTC+9)	Gabriel Xavier (yellow card) 37'; Jô 75'; Kobayashi (yellow card) 84'	Report	Kida 26'; Ogihara (yellow card) 55'	Stadium: Toyota Stadium; Attendance: 38,280; Referee: Ryuji Sato

12 May 2018 14	V-Varen Nagasaki	3–0	Nagoya Grampus	Isahaya
14:00 JST (UTC+9)	Nakamura 3', 49'; Suzuki 76'	Report		Stadium: Transcosmos Stadium Nagasaki; Attendance: 8,252; Referee: Jumpei Iida

20 May 2018 15	Nagoya Grampus	2–3	Kashiwa Reysol	Toyota
14:00 JST (UTC+9)	Jô 41'; Tamada 64'; Washington (yellow card) 74'	Report	Esaka 16', 56'; Koizumi (yellow card) 38'; Nakayama 47'; Ito (yellow card) 54'	Stadium: Toyota Stadium; Attendance: 21,327; Referee: Yudai Yamamoto

18 July 2018 16	Urawa Red Diamonds	3–1	Nagoya Grampus	Saitama
19:30 JST (UTC+9)	Endo 40', 78'; Makino 70'	Report	Gabriel Xavier 45+1'	Stadium: Saitama Stadium 2002; Attendance: 21,250; Referee: Hiroyuki Kimura

22 July 2018 17	Nagoya Grampus	0–0	Sanfrecce Hiroshima	Toyota
18:00 JST (UTC+9)		Report		Stadium: Toyota Stadium; Attendance: 20,244; Referee: Yusuke Araki

28 July 2018 18	Nagoya Grampus	–	Hokkaido Consadole Sapporo	Nagoya
18:00 JST (UTC+9)				Stadium: Paloma Mizuho Stadium
Note: Match postponed due to Typhoon No.12.

1 August 2018 19	Vegalta Sendai	1–2	Nagoya Grampus	Sendai
19:00 JST (UTC+9)	Nakano 53'	Report	Jô 30' (yellow card) 90+2'; Maeda 40'	Stadium: Yurtec Stadium Sendai; Attendance: 13,968; Referee: Koichiro Fukushima

5 August 2018 20	Nagoya Grampus	3–2	Gamba Osaka	Toyota
18:00 JST (UTC+9)	Jô 61' (pen.), 79', 84'; Miyahara (yellow card) 69'	Report	Ademilson 22' (pen.); Fujimoto 37'	Stadium: Toyota Stadium; Attendance: 22,615; Referee: Nobutsugu Murakami

11 August 2018 21	Nagoya Grampus	4–2	Kashima Antlers	Toyota
18:00 JST (UTC+9)	Jô 33'; Kobayashi (yellow card) 40'; Kanai 51', 82'; Hattanda (yellow card) 74'; Maeda 90+2'	Report	Doi 50'; Suzuki 72' (pen.)	Stadium: Toyota Stadium; Attendance: 43,579; Referee: Koei Koya

15 August 2018 22	Yokohama F. Marinos	1–2	Nagoya Grampus	Yokohama
19:30 JST (UTC+9)	Cvetinović (yellow card) 44'; Matsubara 49'	Report	Jô 4', 90' (yellow card) 38'; Kanai (yellow card) 56'; Soma (yellow card) 78'	Stadium: Nissan Stadium; Attendance: 24,527; Referee: Jumpei Iida

19 August 2018 23	Nagoya Grampus	3–0	Sagan Tosu	Nagoya
18:00 JST (UTC+9)	Kanai 21'; Izumi 64'; Maeda 75'	Report	Takahashi (yellow card) 70'	Stadium: Paloma Mizuho Stadium; Attendance: 19,646; Referee: Toru Kakinuma

26 August 2018 24	Nagoya Grampus	4–1	Urawa Red Diamonds	Toyota
18:00 JST (UTC+9)	Jô (penalty missed) 29' 44', 70', 79'; Tamada 29'; Neto (yellow card) 65'	Report	Kobayashi 22' (o.g.)	Stadium: Toyota Stadium; Attendance: 26,410; Referee: Yuichi Nishimura

1 September 2018 25	Júbilo Iwata	1–6	Nagoya Grampus	Iwata
19:00 JST (UTC+9)	Ogawa (yellow card) 47'; Araki (yellow card) 90+1'; Oi 90+4'	Report	Kanai 12'; Maeda 55'; Izumi 68'; Jô 70', 90'; Gabriel Xavier 86'	Stadium: Yamaha Stadium; Attendance: 13,647; Referee: Yusuke Araki

15 September 2018 26	Nagoya Grampus	3–4	V-Varen Nagasaki	Nagoya
18:00 JST (UTC+9)	Maeda 30'; Jô 48', 89'; Nakatani (yellow card) 69'; Kanai (yellow card) 90+3'	Report	Suzuki 8', 53', 56' (yellow card) 20'; Nakamura 70' (pen.); Tokunaga (yellow card) 79'; Juanma (yellow card) 90+3'	Stadium: Paloma Mizuho Stadium; Attendance: 18,477; Referee: Tomohiro Inoue

22 September 2018 27	Kawasaki Frontale	3–1	Nagoya Grampus	Kawasaki
19:00 JST (UTC+9)	Izumi 20' (o.g.); Abe 34'; Nakatani 63' (o.g.)	Report	Izumi (yellow card) 38'; Neto (yellow card) 41'; Kobayashi (yellow card) 44'; Maeda 59'	Stadium: Kawasaki Todoroki Stadium; Attendance: 23,790; Referee: Itaru Hirose

30 September 2018 28	Cerezo Osaka	–	Nagoya Grampus	Osaka
16:00 JST (UTC+9)				Stadium: Yanmar Stadium Nagai
Note: Match postponed due to Typhoon No.24.

7 October 2018 29	Nagoya Grampus	1–2	Tokyo	Toyota
16:00 JST (UTC+9)	Nakatani (yellow card) 15'; Jang 90+4' (o.g.); Jô (yellow card) 90+5'	Report	Hashimoto (yellow card) 16'; Omori 65'; Nagai 68'; Jang (yellow card) 71'	Stadium: Toyota Stadium; Attendance: 33,251; Referee: Hiroyuki Kimura

19 October 2018 30	Kashiwa Reysol	0–1	Nagoya Grampus	Kashiwa
19:30 JST (UTC+9)	Takagi (yellow card) 34' (yellow-red card) 77'; Koizumi (yellow card) 67'; Koike (yellow card) 81'	Report	Maeda 35'; Kobayashi (yellow card) 70'	Stadium: Sankyo Frontier Kashiwa Stadium; Attendance: 11,922; Referee: Jumpei Iida

28 October 2018 18	Nagoya Grampus	1–2	Hokkaido Consadole Sapporo	Nagoya
15:00 JST (UTC+9)	Jô 25' (pen.); Hattanda (yellow card) 44' (yellow-red card) 45+1'; Maruyama (yellow card) 83'	Report	Bothroyd 8' (pen.), 42'; Arano (yellow card) 16'; Fukai (yellow card) 26'	Stadium: Paloma Mizuho Stadium; Attendance: 17,400; Referee: Yosuke Kubota
Note: Match Original scheduled for 28 July 2018 but was postponed due to Typhoon No.12.

3 November 2018 31	Nagoya Grampus	1–2	Vissel Kobe	Toyota
14:00 JST (UTC+9)	Tamada 46'; Kushibiki (yellow card) 55'; Neto (yellow card) 76'	Report	Podolski 10', 85'; Nasu (yellow card) 73'; Inoha (yellow card) 82'	Stadium: Toyota Stadium; Attendance: 41,044; Referee: Yusuke Araki

6 November 2018 28	Cerezo Osaka	0–1	Nagoya Grampus	Osaka
19:00 JST (UTC+9)	Y.Tanaka (yellow card) 90+3'	Report	Soma 53'; Neto (yellow card) 72'	Stadium: Kincho Stadium; Attendance: 12,027; Referee: Minoru Tojo

10 November 2018 32	Shimizu S-Pulse	2–0	Nagoya Grampus	Shizuoka
14:00 JST (UTC+9)	Takeuchi (yellow card) 25'; Freire (yellow card) 55'; Douglas 59'; Kitagawa 65'	Report		Stadium: IAI Stadium Nihondaira; Attendance: 17,974; Referee: Ryuji Sato

24 November 2018 33	Sanfrecce Hiroshima	1–2	Nagoya Grampus	Hiroshima
14:00 JST (UTC+9)	Inagaki (yellow card) 29'; Kashiwa 36'; Dangda (yellow card) 55'	Report	Jô 39'; Kobayashi 44'	Stadium: Edion Stadium Hiroshima; Attendance: 21,997; Referee: Yudai Yamamoto

1 December 2018 34	Nagoya Grampus	2–2	Shonan Bellmare	Nagoya
14:00 JST (UTC+9)	Soma (yellow card) 27'; Gabriel Xavier (yellow card) 45+1'; Maruyama (yellow card) 56'; Jô 67' (pen.), 75' (pen.) (yellow card) 90+2'	Report	Kikuchi 19'; Umesaki 37' (pen.); Yamasaki (yellow card) 53'	Stadium: Paloma Mizuho Stadium; Attendance: 24,062; Referee: Jumpei Iida

==== League table ====
Pos	Team	Pld	W	D	L	GF	GA	GD	Pts	Qualification or relegation
13	Shonan Bellmare	34	10	11	13	38	43	−5	41	
14	Sagan Tosu	34	10	11	13	29	34	−5	41	
15	Nagoya Grampus	34	12	5	17	52	59	−7	41	
16	Júbilo Iwata (O)	34	10	11	13	35	48	−13	41	Qualification for the Relegation play-off
17	Kashiwa Reysol (R)	34	12	3	19	47	54	−7	39	Relegation to J2 League

Source: Meiji Yasuda J1 League
Rules for classification: 1) Points; 2) Goal difference; 3) Goals scored
(O) Play-off winners; (R) Relegated

=== J. League Cup ===
==== Group stage ====
7 March 2018 1	Nagoya Grampus	1–4	Urawa Red Diamonds	Nagoya
19:00 JST (UTC+9)	Washington (yellow card) 59'; Satō 87'	Report	Koroki 9', 17'; Ogiwara 15', 31'; Aoki (yellow card) 36'; Lee (yellow card) 49'; Nagasawa (yellow card) 62'	Stadium: Paloma Mizuho Stadium; Attendance: 9,491; Referee: Hajime Matsuo

14 March 2018 2	Sanfrecce Hiroshima	2–1	Nagoya Grampus	Hiroshima
19:30 JST (UTC+9)	Watari 56'; Dangda 65'	Report	Fukahori 77'	Stadium: Hiroshima Big Arch; Attendance: 7,777; Referee: Koei Koya

4 April 2018 3	Nagoya Grampus	1–4	Gamba Osaka	Nagoya
19:00 JST (UTC+9)	Aoki 89'	Report	Nagasawa 5', 16', 29', 41'; Kurata (yellow card) 7'; Miura (yellow card) 85'	Stadium: Paloma Mizuho Stadium; Attendance: 10,122; Referee: Yosuke Kubota

18 April 2018 4	Nagoya Grampus	2–1	Sanfrecce Hiroshima	Nagoya
19:00 JST (UTC+9)	Fukahori 61'; Naruse (yellow card) 69'; Jô 78'; Kobayashi (yellow card) 87'	Report	Watari 35'	Stadium: Paloma Mizuho Stadium; Attendance: 5,412; Referee: Atsushi Kamimura

9 May 2018 5	Urawa Red Diamonds	2–0	Nagoya Grampus	Saitama
19:30 JST (UTC+9)	Martinus 32'; Lee 65'	Report	Hasegawa (yellow card) 12'; Sugawara (yellow card) 77'	Stadium: Saitama Stadium 2002; Attendance: 15,960; Referee: Takuuto Okabe

16 May 2018 6	Gamba Osaka	1–4	Nagoya Grampus	Suita
19:00 JST (UTC+9)	Nagasawa 20' (yellow card) 89'; Hatsuse (yellow card) 54'; Meshino (yellow card) 90+1'	Report	Hatao 15'; Uchida 24', 48'; Kodama 41'; Sugawara (yellow card) 55'; Hattanda (yellow card) 56'	Stadium: Panasonic Stadium Suita; Attendance: 9,907; Referee: Yuichi Nishimura

=== Emperor's Cup ===
6 June 2018 Second Round	Nagoya Grampus	1–1 (a.e.t.) (7–6 p)	Nara Club	Nagoya
19:00 JST (UTC+9)	Gabriel Xavier 45+4'; Uchida (yellow card) 68'; Washington (yellow card) 99'	Report	Sogab (yellow card) 22'; Kanakubo 75'; Yamada (yellow card) 115'	Stadium: Paloma Mizuho Stadium; Attendance: 2,214; Referee: Kazuyuki Shindo
	Penalties
	Gabriel Xavier (penalty scored); Kobayashi (penalty missed); Satō (penalty scored); Izumi (penalty scored); Uchida (penalty scored); Miyahara (penalty scored); Hasegawa (penalty scored); Hattanda (penalty scored)		Sogabe (penalty scored); Mukai (penalty missed); Fuse (penalty scored); Kanakubo (penalty scored); Fujii (penalty scored); K.Sato (penalty scored); Maeda (penalty scored); Yamada (penalty missed)
Note: Match originally ended in a 4–2 penalty win to Nagoya Grampus, but due to an error by the referee the penalty kicks where re-taken on 11 June, with Nagoya Grampus remaining victorious 7–6.

22 August 2018 Third Round	Sanfrecce Hiroshima	4–1 (a.e.t.)	Nagoya Grampus	Hiroshima
19:03 JST (UTC+9)	Kudo 6'; Yoshino (yellow card) 25'; Patric 99', 105+1', 117'; Mawatari (yellow card) 102'	Report	Fukahori 18'; Nakatani (red card) 91'	Stadium: Edion Stadium Hiroshima; Attendance: 2,822; Referee: Fumio Shibaoka

== Squad statistics ==
As of match played 1 December 2018

=== Appearances and goals ===
No.	Pos	Nat	Player	Total		J-League		J-League Cup		Emperor's Cup	
No.	Pos	Nat	Player	Apps	Goals	Apps	Goals	Apps	Goals	Apps	Goals
3	DF	(Japan) JPN	Kazuki Kushibiki	26	0	17+3	0	4	0	2	0
4	MF	(Japan) JPN	Yuki Kobayashi	37	1	29+3	1	1+3	0	1	0
5	DF	(Japan) JPN	Ikki Arai	12	0	5+6	0	0	0	1	0
6	DF	(Japan) JPN	Kazuya Miyahara	29	0	26	0	1+1	0	1	0
7	FW	(Brazil) BRA	Jô	37	25	31+2	24	0+3	1	0+1	0
9	MF	(Japan) JPN	Ariajasuru Hasegawa	25	0	14+4	0	1+4	0	1+1	0
10	MF	(Brazil) BRA	Gabriel Xavier	30	7	27+2	6	0	0	1	1
11	FW	(Japan) JPN	Hisato Satō	14	1	1+8	0	3	1	1+1	0
13	FW	(Japan) JPN	Yuki Ogaki	2	0	0	0	2	0	0	0
14	MF	(Japan) JPN	Yosuke Akiyama	27	0	16+6	0	3+1	0	1	0
15	MF	(Brazil) BRA	Eduardo Neto	15	0	15	0	0	0	0	0
16	GK	(Japan) JPN	Yohei Takeda	5	0	0	0	5	0	0	0
17	DF	(Japan) JPN	Yuichi Maruyama	18	0	18	0	0	0	0	0
18	GK	(Japan) JPN	Tsubasa Shibuya	2	0	0	0	1	0	1	0
20	DF	(Japan) JPN	Shinnosuke Nakatani	18	0	17	0	0	0	0+1	0
21	MF	(Japan) JPN	Kohei Hattanda	16	0	4+7	0	3	0	1+1	0
22	GK	(Australia) AUS	Mitchell Langerak	35	0	34	0	0	0	1	0
23	MF	(Japan) JPN	Ryota Aoki	20	1	16+2	0	2	1	0	0
25	MF	(Japan) JPN	Naoki Maeda	18	7	15+3	7	0	0	0	0
28	FW	(Japan) JPN	Keiji Tamada	28	3	19+5	3	3	0	1	0
29	DF	(Japan) JPN	Ryuji Izumi	37	2	21+11	2	0+3	0	2	0
31	DF	(Japan) JPN	Takashi Kanai	15	4	11+4	4	0	0	0	0
32	MF	(Japan) JPN	Shumpei Fukahori	9	3	2+2	0	3+1	2	1	1
36	DF	(Brazil) BRA	Willian Rocha	8	3	8	3	0	0	0	0
37	FW	(Japan) JPN	Daiki Enomoto	3	0	1+1	0	1	0	0	0
38	MF	(Japan) JPN	Shunto Kodama	9	1	4+4	0	1	1	0	0
41	DF	(Japan) JPN	Yukinari Sugawara	19	0	12+1	0	4	0	2	0
43	DF	(Japan) JPN	Haruya Fujii	3	0	0	0	3	0	0	0
44	MF	(Japan) JPN	Shumpei Naruse	6	0	0+1	0	5	0	0	0
46	MF	(Japan) JPN	Ryutaro Ishida	1	0	0	0	0	0	1	0
47	MF	(Japan) JPN	Yuki Soma	9	1	3+6	1	0	0	0	0
49	FW	(Japan) JPN	Kudo Hyodo	1	0	0	0	0	0	0+1	0
Players away on loan:
2	DF	(Japan) JPN	Hiroto Hatao	6	1	2+1	0	3	1	0	0
33	MF	(Japan) JPN	Kanta Kajiyama	3	0	0	0	1+1	0	0+1	0
39	DF	(Japan) JPN	Kenta Uchida	12	2	1+5	0	5	2	1	0
Players who left Nagoya Grampus during the season:
8	MF	(Brazil) BRA	Washington	12	0	5+1	0	5	0	1	0
19	FW	(Japan) JPN	Yuki Oshitani	13	0	0+7	0	5	0	1	0

=== Goal Scorers ===
Place	Position	Nation	Number	Name	J-League	J-League Cup	Emperor's Cup	Total
1	FW	(Brazil)	7	Jô	24	1	0	25
2	MF	(Japan)	25	Naoki Maeda	7	0	0	7
2	MF	(Brazil)	10	Gabriel Xavier	6	0	1	7
4	DF	(Japan)	31	Takashi Kanai	4	0	0	4
5	DF	(Brazil)	36	Willian Rocha	3	0	0	3
5	FW	(Japan)	28	Keiji Tamada	3	0	0	3
5	MF	(Japan)	32	Shumpei Fukahori	0	2	1	3
8	DF	(Japan)	29	Ryuji Izumi	2	0	0	2
8	DF	(Japan)	39	Kenta Uchida	0	2	0	2
10	MF	(Japan)	47	Yuki Soma	1	0	0	1
10	MF	(Japan)	4	Yuki Kobayashi	1	0	0	1
10	FW	(Japan)	11	Hisato Satō	0	1	0	1
10	MF	(Japan)	23	Ryota Aoki	0	1	0	1
10	DF	(Japan)	2	Hiroto Hatao	0	1	0	1
10	MF	(Japan)	38	Shunto Kodama	0	1	0	1
10				Own goal	1	0	0	1
				TOTALS	52	9	2	63

=== Disciplinary record ===
Number	Nation	Position	Name	J-League		J. League Cup		Emperor's Cup		Total	
Number	Nation	Position	Name	Booked	Sent off (straight red)	Booked	Sent off (straight red)	Booked	Sent off (straight red)	Booked	Sent off (straight red)
3	(Japan)	DF	Kazuki Kushibiki	4	0	0	0	0	0	4	0
4	(Japan)	MF	Yuki Kobayashi	7	0	1	0	0	0	8	0
6	(Japan)	DF	Kazuya Miyahara	1	0	0	0	0	0	1	0
7	(Brazil)	FW	Jô	6	0	0	0	0	0	6	0
9	(Japan)	MF	Ariajasuru Hasegawa	4	1	1	0	0	0	5	1
10	(Brazil)	MF	Gabriel Xavier	4	0	0	0	0	0	4	0
14	(Japan)	MF	Yosuke Akiyama	1	0	0	0	0	0	1	0
15	(Brazil)	MF	Eduardo Neto	4	0	0	0	0	0	4	0
17	(Japan)	DF	Yuichi Maruyama	2	0	0	0	0	0	2	0
20	(Japan)	DF	Shinnosuke Nakatani	2	0	0	0	0	1	2	1
21	(Japan)	MF	Kohei Hattanda	3	1	1	0	0	0	4	1
29	(Japan)	DF	Ryuji Izumi	1	0	0	0	0	0	1	0
31	(Japan)	DF	Takashi Kanai	2	0	0	0	0	0	2	0
41	(Japan)	DF	Yukinari Sugawara	0	0	2	0	0	0	2	0
44	(Japan)	MF	Shumpei Naruse	0	0	1	0	0	0	1	0
47	(Japan)	MF	Yuki Soma	2	0	0	0	0	0	2	0
Players away on loan:
39	(Japan)	DF	Kenta Uchida	0	0	0	0	1	0	1	0
Players who left Nagoya Grampus during the season:
8	(Brazil)	MF	Washington	5	0	1	0	1	0	7	0
			TOTALS	50	2	7	0	2	1	59	3
