= List of J1 League football transfers summer 2019 =

This is a list of Japanese football J1 League transfers in the summer transfer window 2019 by club.

== J1 League ==
=== Kawasaki Frontale ===
In: Note: Flags indicate national team as defined under FIFA eligibility rules; some limited exceptions apply. Players may hold more than one non-FIFA nationality.

No.	Pos.	Nation	Player
36	GK	JPN	Hiroki Mawatari (on loan from (Japan) Ehime FC)
—	MF	JPN	Zain Issaka (from Toin Yokohama University)
—	MF	JPN	Koji Miyoshi (from (Japan) Yokohama F. Marinos, end of loan)

Out: Note: Flags indicate national team as defined under FIFA eligibility rules; some limited exceptions apply. Players may hold more than one non-FIFA nationality.

No.	Pos.	Nation	Player
17	MF	JPN	Yuto Suzuki (on loan to (Japan) Gamba Osaka)
29	DF	JPN	Michael Fitzgerald (to (Japan) Albirex Niigata)
30	FW	JPN	Taisei Miyashiro (on loan to (Japan) Renofa Yamaguchi)
44	MF	BRA	Caio César (on loan to (Japan) V-Varen Nagasaki)
—	MF	JPN	Koji Miyoshi (on loan to (Belgium) Royal Antwerp)

=== Sanfrecce Hiroshima ===
In: Note: Flags indicate national team as defined under FIFA eligibility rules; some limited exceptions apply. Players may hold more than one non-FIFA nationality.

No.	Pos.	Nation	Player
44	FW	BRA	Leandro Pereira (on loan from (Japan) Matsumoto Yamaga)
—	MF	JPN	Yuya Asano (from (Japan) Mito HollyHock)

Out: Note: Flags indicate national team as defined under FIFA eligibility rules; some limited exceptions apply. Players may hold more than one non-FIFA nationality.

No.	Pos.	Nation	Player
4	DF	JPN	Hiroki Mizumoto (on loan to (Japan) Matsumoto Yamaga)
9	FW	AUS	Besart Berisha (released)
10	FW	BRA	Patric (on loan to (Japan) Gamba Osaka)
22	FW	JPN	Yusuke Minagawa (to (Japan) Yokohama FC)
34	GK	JPN	Hirotsugu Nakabayashi (on loan to (Japan) Yokohama F. Marinos)
50	DF	JPN	Soya Takahashi (to (Sweden) AFC Eskilstuna)
—	MF	JPN	Yuya Asano (on loan to (Japan) Mito HollyHock)

=== Kashima Antlers ===
In: Note: Flags indicate national team as defined under FIFA eligibility rules; some limited exceptions apply. Players may hold more than one non-FIFA nationality.

No.	Pos.	Nation	Player
37	MF	JPN	Kei Koizumi (from (Japan) Kashiwa Reysol)
47	MF	JPN	Yuki Soma (on loan from (Japan) Nagoya Grampus)

Out: Note: Flags indicate national team as defined under FIFA eligibility rules; some limited exceptions apply. Players may hold more than one non-FIFA nationality.

No.	Pos.	Nation	Player
9	FW	JPN	Yuma Suzuki (to (Belgium) Sint-Truiden VV)
10	MF	JPN	Hiroki Abe (to (Spain) FC Barcelona)
14	FW	JPN	Takeshi Kanamori (on loan to (Japan) Sagan Tosu)
15	MF	JPN	Taiki Hirato (to (Japan) Machida Zelvia)
22	DF	JPN	Koki Anzai (to (Portugal) Portimonense SC)

=== Hokkaido Consadole Sapporo ===
In: Note: Flags indicate national team as defined under FIFA eligibility rules; some limited exceptions apply. Players may hold more than one non-FIFA nationality.

No.	Pos.	Nation	Player
—	DF	JPN	Shunta Tanaka (from Osaka University of Health and Sport Sciences)

Out: Note: Flags indicate national team as defined under FIFA eligibility rules; some limited exceptions apply. Players may hold more than one non-FIFA nationality.

No.	Pos.	Nation	Player
6	MF	JPN	Shogo Nakahara (to (Japan) Vegalta Sendai)
24	DF	JPN	Toya Nakamura (on loan to (Japan) Honda FC)
44	MF	JPN	Shinji Ono (to (Japan) FC Ryukyu)

=== Urawa Red Diamonds ===
In: Note: Flags indicate national team as defined under FIFA eligibility rules; some limited exceptions apply. Players may hold more than one non-FIFA nationality.

No.	Pos.	Nation	Player
39	MF	JPN	Kosuke Taketomi (from (Japan) Shonan Bellmare, end of loan)
41	MF	JPN	Takahiro Sekine (from (Germany) FC Ingolstadt 04)
—	MF	JPN	Tomoaki Okubo (from Chuo University)

Out: Note: Flags indicate national team as defined under FIFA eligibility rules; some limited exceptions apply. Players may hold more than one non-FIFA nationality.

No.	Pos.	Nation	Player
17	DF	JPN	Rikiya Motegi (on loan to (Japan) Ehime FC)
18	MF	JPN	Naoki Yamada (on loan to (Japan) Shonan Bellmare)
19	FW	AUS	Andrew Nabbout (to (Australia) Melbourne Victory)

=== FC Tokyo ===
In: Note: Flags indicate national team as defined under FIFA eligibility rules; some limited exceptions apply. Players may hold more than one non-FIFA nationality.

No.	Pos.	Nation	Player
7	MF	JPN	Hirotaka Mita (from (Japan) Vissel Kobe)
22	DF	KOR	Oh Jae-suk (on loan from (Japan) Gamba Osaka)
—	DF	JPN	Hotaka Nakamura (from Meiji University)
—	DF	JPN	Kazunori Yoshimoto (from (Japan) Avispa Fukuoka, end of loan)
—	DF	JPN	Masayuki Yamada (from (Japan) Machida Zelvia, end of loan)

Out: Note: Flags indicate national team as defined under FIFA eligibility rules; some limited exceptions apply. Players may hold more than one non-FIFA nationality.

No.	Pos.	Nation	Player
6	DF	JPN	Kosuke Ota (to (Japan) Nagoya Grampus)
15	FW	JPN	Takefusa Kubo (to (Spain) Real Madrid)
40	MF	JPN	Rei Hirakawa (on loan to (Japan) Kagoshima United FC)
48	DF	KOR	Jang Hyun-Soo (to (Saudi Arabia) Al Hilal FC)
—	DF	JPN	Kazunori Yoshimoto (to (Japan) Shimizu S-Pulse)
—	DF	JPN	Masayuki Yamada (on loan to (Japan) Avispa Fukuoka)

=== Cerezo Osaka ===
In: Note: Flags indicate national team as defined under FIFA eligibility rules; some limited exceptions apply. Players may hold more than one non-FIFA nationality.

No.	Pos.	Nation	Player
18	FW	JPN	Koji Suzuki (from (Japan) Cerezo Osaka)
—	DF	JPN	Tatsuya Tabira (from Kobe Koryo Gakuen High School)

Out: Note: Flags indicate national team as defined under FIFA eligibility rules; some limited exceptions apply. Players may hold more than one non-FIFA nationality.

No.	Pos.	Nation	Player
17	MF	JPN	Takaki Fukumitsu (on loan to (Japan) Mito HollyHock)
23	DF	JPN	Tatsuya Yamashita (to (Japan) Kashiwa Reysol)
26	MF	JPN	Daichi Akiyama (on loan to (Japan) Montedio Yamagata)
31	FW	JPN	Towa Yamane (on loan to (Japan) Zweigen Kanazawa)
34	FW	JPN	Hiroto Yamada (on loan to (Japan) FC Ryukyu)
—	FW	JPN	Takeru Kishimoto (to (Japan) Tokushima Vortis, previously on loan)

=== Shimizu S-Pulse ===
In: Note: Flags indicate national team as defined under FIFA eligibility rules; some limited exceptions apply. Players may hold more than one non-FIFA nationality.

No.	Pos.	Nation	Player
4	DF	JPN	Kazunori Yoshimoto (from (Japan) FC Tokyo)
11	FW	BRA	Junior Dutra (from (Brazil) Corinthians Paulista)
29	DF	JPN	Naoya Fukumori (from (Japan) Oita Trinita)
39	GK	JPN	Takuo Okubo (from (Japan) Sagan Tosu)

Out: Note: Flags indicate national team as defined under FIFA eligibility rules; some limited exceptions apply. Players may hold more than one non-FIFA nationality.

No.	Pos.	Nation	Player
23	FW	JPN	Koya Kitagawa (to (Austria) Rapid Wien)
33	DF	BRA	Wanderson (to (Japan) Atletico Paranaense, end of loan)
36	MF	JPN	Yasufumi Nishimura (on loan to (Japan) Fagiano Okayama)
37	FW	JPN	Daigo Takahashi (on loan to (Japan) Giravanz Kitakyushu)

=== Gamba Osaka ===
In: Note: Flags indicate national team as defined under FIFA eligibility rules; some limited exceptions apply. Players may hold more than one non-FIFA nationality.

No.	Pos.	Nation	Player
14	MF	ESP	Markel Susaeta (from (Spain) Athletic Bilbao)
15	MF	JPN	Yosuke Ideguchi (from (England) Renofa Yamaguchi)
17	MF	JPN	Yuto Suzuki (on loan from (Japan) Kawasaki Frontale)
18	FW	BRA	Patric (on loan from (Japan) Sanfrecce Hiroshima)
20	FW	JPN	Daisuke Takagi (from (Japan) Renofa Yamaguchi)
29	MF	JPN	Yuki Yamamoto (from Kwansei Gakuin University)
33	FW	JPN	Takashi Usami (from (Germany) FC Augsburg)

Out: Note: Flags indicate national team as defined under FIFA eligibility rules; some limited exceptions apply. Players may hold more than one non-FIFA nationality.

No.	Pos.	Nation	Player
2	DF	JPN	Hiroki Noda (on loan to (Japan) Montedio Yamagata)
6	MF	JPN	Tatsuya Tanaka (to (Japan) Oita Trinita)
11	FW	KOR	Hwang Ui-jo (to (France) FC Girondins de Bordeaux)
14	DF	JPN	Koki Yonekura (on loan to (Japan) JEF United Chiba)
15	MF	JPN	Yasuyuki Konno (to (Japan) Jubilo Iwata)
18	FW	JPN	Akito Takagi (on loan to (Japan) Montedio Yamagata)
22	DF	KOR	Oh Jae-suk (on loan to (Japan) FC Tokyo)
25	MF	JPN	Jungo Fujimoto (on loan to (Japan) Kyoto Sanga)
28	MF	JPN	Takahiro Ko (on loan to (Japan) Renofa Yamaguchi)
38	FW	JPN	Keito Nakamura (on loan to (Netherlands) FC Twente)
40	FW	JPN	Ryotaro Meshino (to (England) Manchester City FC)

=== Vissel Kobe ===
In: Note: Flags indicate national team as defined under FIFA eligibility rules; some limited exceptions apply. Players may hold more than one non-FIFA nationality.

No.	Pos.	Nation	Player
4	DF	BEL	Thomas Vermaelen (from (Spain) FC Barcelona)
9	FW	JPN	Noriaki Fujimoto (from (Japan) Oita Trinita)
18	GK	JPN	Hiroki Iikura (from (Japan) Yokohama F. Marinos)
24	DF	JPN	Gotoku Sakai (from (Germany) Hamburger SV)
38	FW	JPN	Daiju Sasaki (from (Brazil) Palmeiras, end of loan)
44	DF	LBN	Joan Oumari (from (United Arab Emirates) Al Nasr SC)

Out: Note: Flags indicate national team as defined under FIFA eligibility rules; some limited exceptions apply. Players may hold more than one non-FIFA nationality.

No.	Pos.	Nation	Player
14	MF	JPN	Hirotaka Mita (to (Japan) FC Tokyo)
15	DF	JPN	Daiki Miya (on loan to (Japan) Mito HollyHock)
18	GK	KOR	Kim Seung-kyu (to (South Korea) Ulsan Hyundai FC)
19	DF	JPN	Ryo Hatsuse (on loan to (Japan) Avispa Fukuoka)
24	MF	JPN	Masatoshi Mihara (to (Japan) Kashiwa Reysol)
31	MF	JPN	Yuya Nakasaka (on loan to (Japan) Kyoto Sanga)
40	DF	JPN	Yuki Kobayashi (on loan to (Japan) Machida Zelvia)

=== Vegalta Sendai ===
In: Note: Flags indicate national team as defined under FIFA eligibility rules; some limited exceptions apply. Players may hold more than one non-FIFA nationality.

No.	Pos.	Nation	Player
6	MF	JPN	Shogo Nakahara (from (Japan) Hokkaido Consadole Sapporo)
24	GK	POL	Jakub Slowik (from (Poland) Slask Wroclaw)
29	FW	BRA	Diogo Acosta (from (United Arab Emirates) Dibba Al-Fujairah)

Out: Note: Flags indicate national team as defined under FIFA eligibility rules; some limited exceptions apply. Players may hold more than one non-FIFA nationality.

No.	Pos.	Nation	Player
1	GK	JPN	Daniel Schmidt (to (Belgium) Sint-Truiden VV)

=== Yokohama F. Marinos ===
In: Note: Flags indicate national team as defined under FIFA eligibility rules; some limited exceptions apply. Players may hold more than one non-FIFA nationality.

No.	Pos.	Nation	Player
15	DF	JPN	Makito Ito (from (Japan) Mito HollyHock)
17	FW	BRA	Erik (on loan from (Brazil) Palmeiras)
26	MF	JPN	Kota Watanabe (from (Japan) Tokyo Verdy)
28	MF	BRA	Mateus (on loan from (Japan) Nagoya Grampus)
34	GK	JPN	Hirotsugu Nakabayashi (on loan from (Japan) Sanfrecce Hiroshima)
42	GK	JPN	Powell Obinna Obi (from Ryutsu Keizai University)
49	MF	JPN	Jin Izumisawa (from (Poland) Pogon Szczecin)

Out: Note: Flags indicate national team as defined under FIFA eligibility rules; some limited exceptions apply. Players may hold more than one non-FIFA nationality.

No.	Pos.	Nation	Player
10	MF	JPN	Jun Amano (on loan to (Belgium) Sporting Lokeren)
14	MF	JPN	Kota Yamada (on loan to (Japan) Nagoya Grampus)
21	GK	JPN	Hiroki Iikura (to (Japan) Vissel Kobe)
26	MF	RUS	Ippei Shinozuka (to (Japan) Omiya Ardija)
32	GK	JPN	Gaku Harada (on loan to (Japan) SC Sagamihara)
40	MF	JPN	Naoki Tsubaki (on loan to (Japan) Giravanz Kitakyushu)
41	MF	JPN	Koji Miyoshi (to (Japan) Kawasaki Frontale, end of loan)

=== Shonan Bellmare ===
In: Note: Flags indicate national team as defined under FIFA eligibility rules; some limited exceptions apply. Players may hold more than one non-FIFA nationality.

No.	Pos.	Nation	Player
10	MF	JPN	Naoki Yamada (on loan from (Japan) Urawa Red Diamonds)
20	FW	JPN	Crislan (on loan from (Portugal) SC Braga)
36	FW	JPN	Ömer Tokaç (from (Germany) Bayer Leverkusen U-19)
40	MF	JPN	Ko Sawada (from (Germany) Kickers Offenbach)
44	DF	JPN	Shunya Mori (from (Japan) Zweigen Kanazawa)
—	DF	JPN	Koki Tachi (from Nihon University)

Out: Note: Flags indicate national team as defined under FIFA eligibility rules; some limited exceptions apply. Players may hold more than one non-FIFA nationality.

No.	Pos.	Nation	Player
17	MF	JPN	Hiroki Akino (on loan to (Japan) V-Varen Nagasaki)
22	MF	BRA	Lelêu (on loan to (Japan) Mito HollyHock)
27	FW	JPN	Kunitomo Suzuki (on loan to (Japan) Gainare Tottori)
39	MF	JPN	Kosuke Taketomi (to (Japan) Urawa Red Diamonds, end of loan)
34	DF	BRA	Rafael Dumas (released)

=== Sagan Tosu ===
In: Note: Flags indicate national team as defined under FIFA eligibility rules; some limited exceptions apply. Players may hold more than one non-FIFA nationality.

No.	Pos.	Nation	Player
5	DF	JPN	Takashi Kanai (on loan from (Japan) Nagoya Grampus)
15	DF	KOR	Park Jeong-su (on loan from (Japan) Kashiwa Reysol)
16	GK	JPN	Kei Ishikawa (from (Japan) Tochigi SC)
27	FW	BRA	Tiago Alves (on loan from (South Korea) Ulsan Hyundai FC)
31	FW	JPN	Daichi Hayashi (from Osaka University of Health & Sport Sciences)
39	FW	JPN	Takeshi Kanamori (on loan from (Japan) Kashima Antlers)

Out: Note: Flags indicate national team as defined under FIFA eligibility rules; some limited exceptions apply. Players may hold more than one non-FIFA nationality.

No.	Pos.	Nation	Player
1	GK	JPN	Takuo Okubo (to (Japan) Shimizu S-Pulse)
5	DF	CRO	Nino Galovic (on loan to (Belarus) FC Dinamo Minsk)
9	FW	ESP	Fernando Torres (retired)
16	MF	JPN	Yatsunori Shimaya (on loan to (Japan) Tokushima Vortis)
20	DF	CRO	Karlo Brucic (released)
26	MF	JPN	Ryoya Ito (released)
32	FW	COL	Victor Ibarbo (on loan to (Japan) V-Varen Nagasaki)

=== Nagoya Grampus ===
In: Note: Flags indicate national team as defined under FIFA eligibility rules; some limited exceptions apply. Players may hold more than one non-FIFA nationality.

No.	Pos.	Nation	Player
36	DF	JPN	Kosuke Ota (from (Japan) FC Tokyo)
37	MF	JPN	Shumpei Fukahori (from (Portugal) Vitória S.C., end of loan)
38	MF	JPN	Kota Yamada (on loan from (Japan) Yokohama F. Marinos)

Out: Note: Flags indicate national team as defined under FIFA eligibility rules; some limited exceptions apply. Players may hold more than one non-FIFA nationality.

No.	Pos.	Nation	Player
3	DF	JPN	Kazuki Kushibiki (on loan to (Japan) Omiya Ardija)
4	MF	JPN	Yuki Kobayashi (to (Japan) Oita Trinita)
11	MF	BRA	Mateus (on loan to (Japan) Yokohama F. Marinos)
13	FW	JPN	Yuki Ogaki (on loan to (Japan) Iwate Grulla Morioka)
14	DF	JPN	Yosuke Akiyama (on loan to (Japan) Jubilo Iwata)
24	DF	JPN	Yukinari Sugawara (on loan to (Netherlands) AZ Alkmaar)
27	MF	JPN	Yuki Soma (on loan to (Japan) Kashima Antlers)
31	DF	JPN	Takashi Kanai (on loan to (Japan) Sagan Tosu)

=== Jubilo Iwata ===
In: Note: Flags indicate national team as defined under FIFA eligibility rules; some limited exceptions apply. Players may hold more than one non-FIFA nationality.

No.	Pos.	Nation	Player
2	MF	JPN	Yasuyuki Konno (from (Japan) Gamba Osaka)
29	DF	JPN	Yosuke Akiyama (on loan from (Japan) Nagoya Grampus)
37	DF	BRA	Fábio (free agent)
39	FW	BRA	Lukian (from (Thailand) Chonburi FC)
40	MF	NED	Lorenzo Ebecilio (from (Serbia) Red Star Belgrade)

Out: Note: Flags indicate national team as defined under FIFA eligibility rules; some limited exceptions apply. Players may hold more than one non-FIFA nationality.

No.	Pos.	Nation	Player
6	DF	TUR	Eren Albayrak (to (Turkey) Antalyaspor)
10	MF	JPN	Shunsuke Nakamura (to (Japan) Yokohama FC)
11	FW	LUX	Gerson Rodrigues (to (Ukraine) Dynamo Kyiv)
18	FW	JPN	Koki Ogawa (on loan to (Japan) Mito HollyHock)
28	DF	JPN	Ryoma Ishida (on loan to (Japan) Renofa Yamaguchi)

=== Matsumoto Yamaga ===
In: Note: Flags indicate national team as defined under FIFA eligibility rules; some limited exceptions apply. Players may hold more than one non-FIFA nationality.

No.	Pos.	Nation	Player
26	MF	JPN	Masaki Yamamoto (on loan from (Japan) JEF United Chiba)
39	DF	JPN	Toshiya Takagi (from (Japan) Kashiwa Reysol)
41	DF	JPN	Hiroki Mizumoto (on loan from (Japan) Sanfrecce Hiroshima)
45	FW	GNB	Isma (from (Iran) Esteghal FC)
50	FW	JPN	Toyofumi Sakano (from (Japan) Montedio Yamagata)

Out: Note: Flags indicate national team as defined under FIFA eligibility rules; some limited exceptions apply. Players may hold more than one non-FIFA nationality.

No.	Pos.	Nation	Player
7	MF	JPN	Daizen Maeda (on loan to (Portugal) Maritimo)
10	FW	BRA	Leandro Pereira (on loan to (Japan) Sanfrecce Hiroshima)
17	MF	JPN	Koki Tsukagawa (on loan to (Japan) FC Gifu)
18	DF	JPN	Takefumi Toma (on loan to (Japan) FC Gifu)
19	FW	JPN	Hiroki Yamamoto (on loan to (Japan) Fagiano Okayama)
24	DF	JPN	Masahiro Nasukawa (to (Japan) Fujieda MYFC)
27	FW	JPN	Itsuki Enomoto (on loan to (Japan) Thespakusatsu Gunma)
28	MF	JPN	Ryuhei Yamamoto (on loan to (Japan) Montedio Yamagata)

=== Oita Trinita ===
In: Note: Flags indicate national team as defined under FIFA eligibility rules; some limited exceptions apply. Players may hold more than one non-FIFA nationality.

No.	Pos.	Nation	Player
6	MF	JPN	Yuki Kobayashi (from (Japan) Nagoya Grampus)
37	MF	JPN	Shintaro Shimada (on loan from (Japan) Omiya Ardija)
50	MF	JPN	Tatsuya Tanaka (from (Japan) Gamba Osaka)

Out: Note: Flags indicate national team as defined under FIFA eligibility rules; some limited exceptions apply. Players may hold more than one non-FIFA nationality.

No.	Pos.	Nation	Player
6	DF	JPN	Naoya Fukumori (to (Japan) Shimizu S-Pulse)
10	FW	JPN	Noriaki Fujimoto (to (Japan) Vissel Kobe)
11	FW	JPN	Kenji Baba (on loan to (Japan) FC Gifu)
28	MF	JPN	Daisuke Sakai (on loan to (Japan) Thespakusatsu Gunma)
30	FW	JPN	Tsubasa Yoshihira (on loan to (Japan) Fujieda MYFC)
38	DF	JPN	Keita Takahata (on loan to (Japan) Gainare Tottori)
