= Shunpei =

- Gender: Male

Origin
- Origin: Japanese
- Meaning: Different meanings depending on the kanji used

Shunpei or Shumpei (written: 俊平, 舜平, 春平, 隼平 or 竣平) is a masculine Japanese given name. Notable people with the name include:

- Shumpei Fukahori (深堀 隼平; born 1998), Japanese footballer
- Shunpei Hashioka (橋岡 俊平; 1911–1978), Japanese boxer
- Shumpei Inoue (井上 俊平), Japanese footballer
- Shunpei Mizuno (水野 俊平; born 1968), Japanese writer
- Shumpei Naruse (成瀬 竣平; born 2001), Japanese footballer
- Shunpei Ueyama (上山 春平; 1921–2012), Japanese philosopher
- Shunpei Uto (鵜藤 俊平; 1918–?), Japanese swimmer
- Shunpei Yamazaki (山崎 舜平; born 1942), Japanese inventor
