= Yuki Hayashi =

Yuki Hayashi may refer to:

- Yuki Hayashi (archer) (林 勇気, born 1984), Japanese archer
- Yuki Hayashi (composer) (林 ゆうき, born 1980), Japanese composer and arranger

== See also ==
- Yuki Kobayashi (born 1987), Japanese cross-country skier
- Yuki Kobayashi (footballer, born 1988), Japanese footballer
- Yuki Kobayashi (footballer, born 1992), Japanese footballer
