= Eduardo Neto =

Brazilian footballer (born 1988)

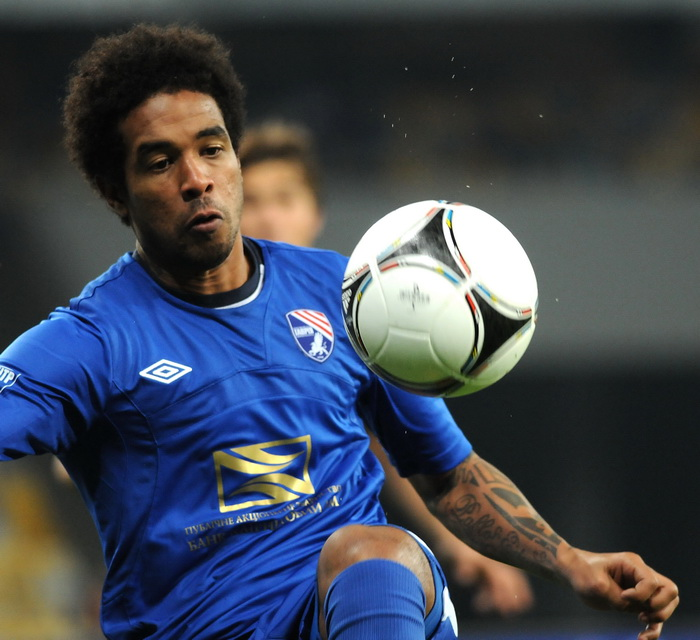

Personal information
- Full name: Eduardo da Silva Nascimento Neto
- Date of birth: 24 October 1988 (age 38)
- Place of birth: Salvador, Brazil
- Height: 1.83 m (6 ft 0 in)
- Positions: Centre-back; defensive midfielder

Team information
- Current team: Operário Ferroviário

Youth career
- Bahia

Senior career*
Years	Team	Apps	(Gls)
2006–2008	Bahia	2	(0)
2008–2014	Villa Rio	0	(0)
2008–2010	→ Botafogo (loan)	61	(0)
2010	→ Braga (loan)	0	(0)
2011	→ Vitória (loan)	10	(0)
2012	→ ABC (loan)	9	(0)
2012–2013	→ Tavriya Simferopol (loan)	19	(1)
2014–2015	Avaí	85	(0)
2016–2018	Kawasaki Frontale	71	(5)
2018–2020	Nagoya Grampus	31	(0)
2021	Tombense	24	(0)
2022–2023	Oita Trinita	22	(2)
2023	Operário Ferroviário	7	(1)
2024	Jacuipense	3	(0)
Total		352	(9)
- * Club domestic league appearances and goals

Eduardo da Silva Nascimento Neto (born 24 October 1988), known as Eduardo Neto, is a Brazilian former professional footballer who plays as a central defender or a defensive midfielder.

== Career ==
Neto left his club Villa Rio on 21 June 2010 and signed with Portuguese club Braga.

On 13 January 2011, he joined Vitória on loan until the end of the season.

On 29 June 2018, Nagoya Grampus announced the signing of Neto. On 12 February 2020, Neto was released by Nagoya Grampus.

== Career statistics ==
Appearances and goals by club, season and competition
Club	Season	League			State League		National cup		League cup		Continental		Other		Total	
Club	Season	Division	Apps	Goals	Apps	Goals	Apps	Goals	Apps	Goals	Apps	Goals	Apps	Goals	Apps	Goals
Bahia	2007	Série C	9	1	—		—		—		—		—		9	1
Botafogo (loan)	2008	Série A	9	0	11	0	2	0	—		1	1	—		23	1
Botafogo (loan)	2009	Série A	21	0	7	0	—		—		2	0	—		30	0
Botafogo (loan)	2010	Série A	—		13	0	2	0	—		—		—		15	0
Botafogo (loan)	Total		30	0	31	0	4	0	—		3	1	—		68	1
Vitória (loan)	2011	Série B	—		10	0	—		—		—		—		10	0
ABC (loan)	2012	Série B	9	0	—		3	0	—		—		—		12	0
Tavriya Simferopol (loan)	2012–13	Ukrainian Premier League	19	1	—		2	0	—		—		—		21	1
Avaí	2014	Série B	33	0	16	0	5	0	—		—		—		54	0
Avaí	2015	Série A	28	0	8	0	3	0	—		—		—		39	0
Avaí	Total		61	0	24	0	8	0	—		—		—		93	0
Kawasaki Frontale	2016	J1 League	29	2	—		3	1	5	1	—		—		37	4
Kawasaki Frontale	2017	J1 League	31	1	—		2	0	4	0	10 (Note: Appearances and goal in the AFC Champions League)	1	—		48	2
Kawasaki Frontale	2018	J1 League	11	2	—		0	0	0	0	4	0	1 (Note: Appearance in the Japanese Super Cup)	0	16	2
Kawasaki Frontale	Total		71	5	—		5	1	9	1	14	1	1	0	101	8
Nagoya Grampus	2018	J1 League	15	0	—		0	0	0	0	—		—		15	0
Nagoya Grampus	2019	J1 League	16	0	—		0	0	3	0	—		—		19	0
Nagoya Grampus	Total		31	0	—		0	0	3	0	—		—		34	0
Tombense	2021	Série C	24	0	—		—		—		—		—		24	0
Oita Trinita	2022	J2 League	22	2	—		1	0	3	0	—		1	0	27	2
Operário Ferroviário	2023	Série C	7	1	—		—		—		—		—		7	1
Jacuipense	2024	Série D	3	0	—		—		—		—		—		3	0
Career total			287	9	65	0	17	1	15	1	17	2	2	0	409	13

== Honours ==
Botafogo

- Taça Rio: 2008
- Taca Guanabara: 2009

Kawasaki Frontale

- J1 League: 2017
