= Willian Rocha =

Brazilian footballer

Personal information
- Full name: Willian Pereira da Rocha
- Date of birth: 1 April 1989 (age 37)
- Place of birth: Araguari, Brazil
- Height: 1.86 m (6 ft 1 in)
- Positions: Centre back; left back

Team information
- Current team: Hercílio Luz

Youth career
- –2009: Paulista

Senior career*
| Years | Team | Apps | (Gls) |
| 2009–2010 | Paulista | 14 | (3) |
| 2010–2014 | Fluminense | 0 | (0) |
| 2009–2010 | → Paulista (loan) | 0 | (0) |
| 2011 | → América (loan) | 18 | (2) |
| 2012 | Sport Recife | 9 | (2) |
| 2013 | → Grasshopper (loan) | 5 | (0) |
| 2013 | → Atlético Paranaense (loan) | 3 | (0) |
| 2014– | → Atlético Paranaense (loan) | 11 | (0) |
| 2015 | Avaí | 8 | (2) |
| 2015–2016 | Criciúma | 6 | (0) |
| 2016–2017 | Red Bull Brasil | 15 | (1) |
| 2017–2018 | Guarani | 17 | (2) |
| 2018 | → Nagoya Grampus (loan) | 8 | (3) |
| 2019–2020 | Tombense | 8 | (1) |
| 2019 | → Oeste (loan) | 6 | (1) |
| 2020 | → CSA (loan) | 4 | (0) |
| 2021 | Primavera | 17 | (0) |
| 2022 | Iporá | 12 | (0) |
| 2023– | Hercílio Luz | 13 | (1) |
- * Club domestic league appearances and goals as of 24 August 2023

Willian Pereira da Rocha (born 1 April 1989) is a Brazilian footballer who plays as a defender for Tombense.

== Career ==
On 14 February 2018, Rocha signed for Nagoya Grampus on loan for the 2018 season.
