= Shunto Kodama =

Japanese footballer

Personal information
- Full name: Shunto Kodama
- Date of birth: 3 December 1999 (age 26)
- Place of birth: Osaka, Japan
- Height: 1.66 m (5 ft 5 1/2 in)
- Position: Midfielder

Team information
- Current team: Tokushima Vortis
- Number: 7

Youth career
- Settsu FC
- LEO SC
- 2014–2016: Chuo Gakuin High School

College career
Years	Team	Apps	(Gls)
2017–2020	Tokai Gakuen University		

Senior career*
Years	Team	Apps	(Gls)
2018–2019, 2021	Nagoya Grampus	8	(0)
2021	SC Sagamihara	8	(3)
2022–	Tokushima Vortis	141	(6)
- * Club domestic league appearances and goals as of 14 August 2026

Shunto Kodama (児玉 駿斗, Kodama Shunto; born 3 December 1999) is a Japanese football player who plays for Tokushima Vortis.

== Career statistics ==
=== Club ===
As of match played 16 May 2018

Appearances and goals by club, season and competition
Club	Season	League			National Cup		League Cup		Continental		Other		Total	
Club	Season	Division	Apps	Goals	Apps	Goals	Apps	Goals	Apps	Goals	Apps	Goals	Apps	Goals
Nagoya Grampus	2018	J1	1	0	0	0	1	1	–		–		2	1
Career total			1	0	0	0	1	1	-	-	-	-	2	1
