= Keita Sogabe =

Japanese footballer

Keita Sogabe 曽我部 慶太
Personal information
- Full name: Keita Sogabe
- Date of birth: 2 July 1988 (age 38)
- Place of birth: Amagasaki, Hyōgo, Japan
- Height: 1.73 m (5 ft 8 in)
- Position: Midfielder

Team information
- Current team: J.FC Miyazaki
- Number: 8

Youth career
- 2001–2006: Vissel Kobe

Senior career*
Years	Team	Apps	(Gls)
2007–2008	Vissel Kobe	0	(0)
2009	Vegalta Sendai	0	(0)
2010–2011	Zweigen Kanazawa	54	(6)
2012–2016	SC Sagamihara	129	(29)
2017–2019	Nara Club	45	(3)
2020–	J.FC Miyazaki		
- * Club domestic league appearances and goals as of 23 February 2018

Keita Sogabe (曽我部慶太, Sogabe Keita; July 2, 1988) is a Japanese footballer who plays for J.FC Miyazaki.

== Career statistics ==
Updated to 23 February 2018.

Appearances and goals by club, season and competition
Club	Season	League			Emperor's Cup		J.League Cup		Total	
Club	Season	Division	Apps	Goals	Apps	Goals	Apps	Goals	Apps	Goals
Vissel Kobe	2007	J1 League	0	0	0	0	0	0	0	0
Vissel Kobe	2007	J1 League	0	0	0	0	0	0	0	0
Vegalta Sendai	2009	J2 League	0	0	0	0	–		0	0
Zweigen Kanazawa	2010	JFL	27	4	2	0	–		29	4
Zweigen Kanazawa	2011	JFL	27	2	2	0	–		29	2
SC Sagamihara	2012	JRL	17	5	–		–		0	0
SC Sagamihara	2013	JFL	29	9	–		–		0	0
SC Sagamihara	2014	J3 League	30	7	–		–		0	0
SC Sagamihara	2015	J3 League	36	7	–		–		0	0
SC Sagamihara	2016	J3 League	17	1	–		–		17	1
Nara Club	2017	JFL	11	1	–		–		11	1
Nara Club	2018	JFL	25	2	2	1	–		27	3
Nara Club	2019	JFL	9	0	0	0	–		9	0
Career total			200	36	6	1	0	0	206	37
