= Hiroto Hatao =

Japanese footballer

Personal information
- Full name: Hiroto Hatao
- Date of birth: 16 September 1990 (age 36)
- Place of birth: Nerima, Tokyo, Japan
- Height: 1.83 m (6 ft 0 in)
- Position: Defender

Team information
- Current team: Zweigen Kanazawa
- Number: 3

Youth career
- 2006–2008: FC Tokyo

College career
| Years | Team | Apps | (Gls) |
| 2009–2013 | Waseda University | | |

Senior career*
| Years | Team | Apps | (Gls) |
| 2014–2017 | Ventforet Kofu | 49 | (1) |
| 2018 | Nagoya Grampus | 3 | (0) |
| 2018 | →Omiya Ardija (loan) | 16 | (0) |
| 2019–2020 | Omiya Ardija | 54 | (4) |
| 2021–2023 | Thespakusatsu Gunma | 107 | (9) |
| 2024– | Zweigen Kanazawa | 66 | (5) |
- * Club domestic league appearances and goals as of 21 August 2026

Hiroto Hatao (畑尾 大翔, Hatao Hiroto; born 16 November 1990 in Nerima, Tokyo) is a Japanese footballer who plays for Zweigen Kanazawa.

== Career ==
=== Club ===
On 5 January 2018, Hatao signed for Nagoya Grampus.

== Career statistics ==
=== Club ===
As of end of 2018 season

Appearances and goals by club, season and competition
| Club | Season | League | | | National Cup | | League Cup | | Continental | | Other | | Total | |
| Club | Season | Division | Apps | Goals | Apps | Goals | Apps | Goals | Apps | Goals | Apps | Goals | Apps | Goals |
|---|---|---|---|---|---|---|---|---|---|---|---|---|---|---|
| Ventforet Kofu | 2014 | J1 League | 5 | 0 | 1 | 0 | 0 | 0 | - | | - | | 6 | 0 |
| Ventforet Kofu | 2015 | J1 League | 15 | 0 | 2 | 0 | 5 | 0 | - | | - | | 22 | 0 |
| Ventforet Kofu | 2016 | J1 League | 15 | 0 | 0 | 0 | 6 | 0 | - | | 21 | 0 | | |
| Ventforet Kofu | 2017 | J1 League | 14 | 1 | 0 | 0 | 5 | 0 | - | | - | | 19 | 1 |
| Ventforet Kofu | Total | | 49 | 1 | 2 | 0 | 16 | 0 | - | - | - | - | 67 | 0 |
| Nagoya Grampus | 2018 | J1 League | 3 | 0 | 0 | 0 | 3 | 1 | – | | – | | 6 | 1 |
| Omiya Ardija | 2018 | J2 League | 15 | 0 | 0 | 0 | – | | – | | – | | 15 | 0 |
| Career total | | | 67 | 1 | 2 | 0 | 19 | 1 | - | - | - | - | 88 | 1 |
