= Kohei Hattanda =

Japanese footballer

Kohei Hattanda 八反田 康平
Personal information
- Full name: Kohei Hattanda
- Date of birth: 8 January 1990 (age 36)
- Place of birth: Kagoshima City, Kagoshima Prefecture, Japan
- Height: 1.71 m (5 ft 7 1/2 in)
- Position: Midfielder

Team information
- Current team: J-Lease FC

Youth career
- Kagoshima Chuo High School

College career
Years	Team	Apps	(Gls)
2008–2011	University of Tsukuba		

Senior career*
Years	Team	Apps	(Gls)
2012–2016	Shimizu S-Pulse	31	(1)
2014	→ Vegalta Sendai (loan)	3	(0)
2016	→ Oita Trinita (loan)	14	(1)
2017–2018	Nagoya Grampus	27	(0)
2019–2022	Kagoshima United FC	59	(1)
2023–	J-Lease FC	1	(0)

International career^{‡}
2007	Japan U-17	1	(0)
Medal record
Shimizu S-Pulse
Runner-up	J.League Cup	2012
Representing Japan
AFC U-16 Championship
Gold medal – first place	2006 Singapore
- * Club domestic league appearances and goals as of 22 December 2022, 14:22 (UTC) ‡ National team caps and goals as of 8 January 2018

Kohei Hattanda (八反田 康平, Hattanda Kōhei; born 8 January 1990) is a Japanese footballer who plays as a midfielder for J-Lease FC.

== Club career ==
On 4 December 2011, Hattanda began his professional career with Shimizu S-Pulse. On 8 January 2014, Hattanda was loaned out to Vegalta Sendai. However, he only made three league appearances. On 17 January 2015, he returned to Shimizu, and was part of the starting line-up for the opening game of the 2015 season. He made fewer appearances in the second half, but made a career-high 15 league appearances.

In 2016, Shimizu was relegated to J2, making it his first time playing in the second division, but by July he had only played in one match. On 7 July, he was loaned out to J3 club, Oita Trinita. On July 16, he made his first appearance in the 17th round against Fujieda MYFC and appeared in all 14 games until the final round, contributing to the club's J3 success. On 27 December, Nagoya Grampus announced the permanent signing of Hattanda.

On 27 December 2018, Hattanda joined Kagoshima United for the 2019 season. On 24 November 2022, Kagoshima confirmed that they would not be extending his contract, with Hattanda leaving after four years at the club. On 25 December, Hattanda was officially announced as a new signing of J-Lease FC for the upcoming 2023 season.

== International career ==
In August 2007, while attending Kagoshima Chuo High School, Hattanda was selected to the Japan U-17 national team for the 2007 U-17 World Cup. He played one match against Haiti. During his fourth year at the University of Tsukuba, he was selected as a representative of the Universiade, winning the football tournament at the 2011 Summer Universiade.

== Career statistics ==
As of the end 2022 season.

=== Club ===
Appearances and goals by club, season and competition
Club	Season	League			National Cup		League Cup		Continental		Other		Total	
Club	Season	Division	Apps	Goals	Apps	Goals	Apps	Goals	Apps	Goals	Apps	Goals	Apps	Goals
Shimizu S-Pulse	2012	J1 League	9	0	2	0	4	0	-		-		15	0
Shimizu S-Pulse	2013	J1 League	6	1	3	0	4	1	-		-		13	2
Shimizu S-Pulse	2014	J1 League	0	0	0	0	0	0	-		-		0	0
Vegalta Sendai	2014	J1 League	3	0	1	0	4	0	–		–		8	0
Shimizu S-Pulse	2015	J1 League	15	0	1	0	0	0	-		-		16	0
Shimizu S-Pulse	2016	J2 League	1	0	0	0	-		-		-		1	0
Oita Trinita	2016	J3 League	14	1	1	0	–		–		–		15	1
Nagoya Grampus	2017	J2 League	16	0	0	0	-		-		0	0	16	0
Nagoya Grampus	2018	J1 League	11	0	2	0	3	0	-		-		16	0
Kagoshima United	2019	J2 League	27	1	0	0	0	0	-		-		27	1
Kagoshima United	2020	J3 League	11	0	2	0	0	0	-		-		13	0
Kagoshima United	2021	J3 League	18	0	1	0	0	0	-		-		19	0
Kagoshima United	2022	J3 League	3	0	2	0	4	0	-		-		5	0
J-Lease FC	2023	Japanese Regional Leagues	1	0	0	0	0	0	-		-		0	0
Career total			135	3	13	0	15	1	-	-	-	-	163	4
