= Ikki Arai =

Japanese footballer (born 1993)

Personal information
- Date of birth: November 8, 1993 (age 33)
- Place of birth: Chiba, Japan
- Height: 1.85 m (6 ft 1 in)
- Position: Centre back

Team information
- Current team: V-Varen Nagasaki
- Number: 29

Youth career
- 2009–2011: Shimizu Shogyo High School

College career
Years	Team	Apps	(Gls)
2012–2015	Juntendo University		

Senior career*
Years	Team	Apps	(Gls)
2016–2017	Yokohama F. Marinos	8	(0)
2017	→ Nagoya Grampus (loan)	6	(1)
2018–2019	Nagoya Grampus	11	(0)
2019	→ JEF United Chiba (loan)	29	(2)
2020–2023	JEF United Chiba	119	(11)
2024–	V-Varen Nagasaki	45	(1)

International career
2013	Japan U-20		
Medal record
Yokohama F. Marinos
Runner-up	Emperor's Cup	2017
- * Club domestic league appearances and goals as of 11 August 2026

Ikki Arai (新井 一耀, Arai Ikki; born November 8, 1993) is a Japanese footballer who currently plays for V-Varen Nagasaki as a centre back.

== Career ==
=== Yokohama F. Marinos ===
In the Summer of 2015, Arai signed for Yokohama F. Marinos.

=== Nagoya Grampus ===
On 8 August 2017, Arai signed for Nagoya Grampus on loan, signing for them permanently on 26 December 2017.

== Club statistics ==
=== Club ===
As of 24 December 2019

Appearances and goals by club, season and competition
Club	Season	League			National Cup		League Cup		Continental		Other		Total	
Club	Season	Division	Apps	Goals	Apps	Goals	Apps	Goals	Apps	Goals	Apps	Goals	Apps	Goals
Yokohama F. Marinos	2016	J1 League	5	0	2	0	7	0	–		–		14	0
Yokohama F. Marinos	2017	J1 League	3	0	1	0	5	0	–		–		9	0
Yokohama F. Marinos	Total		8	0	3	0	12	0	-	-	-	-	23	0
Nagoya Grampus (loan)	2017	J2 League	6	1	0	0	–		–		0	0	6	1
Nagoya Grampus	2018	J1 League	11	0	1	0	0	0	–		–		12	0
JEF United Chiba (loan)	2019	J2 League	29	2	1	0	–		–		–		30	2
JEF United Chiba	2020	J2 League					–		–		–			
Career total			54	3	5	0	12	0	-	-	-	-	71	3
