= Gabriel Xavier (footballer, born 1993) =

Brazilian footballer

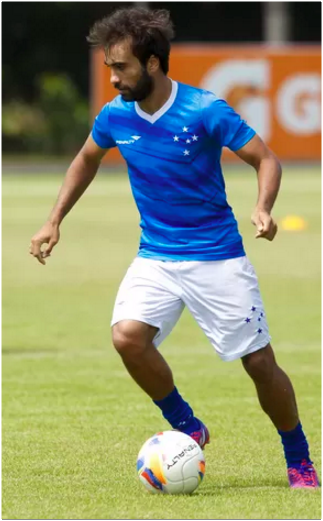
- Gabriel Xavier in 2016

Personal information
- Full name: Gabriel Augusto Xavier
- Date of birth: 15 July 1993 (age 33)
- Place of birth: São Paulo, Brazil
- Height: 1.70 m (5 ft 7 in)
- Position: Attacking midfielder

Youth career
- Corinthians
- 2009–2011: São Paulo
- 2012–2013: Portuguesa

Senior career*
| Years | Team | Apps | (Gls) |
| 2013–2015 | Portuguesa | 39 | (6) |
| 2015–2018 | Cruzeiro | 18 | (1) |
| 2016 | → Sport (loan) | 36 | (4) |
| 2017 | → Vitória (loan) | 11 | (0) |
| 2017–2018 | → Nagoya Grampus (loan) | 45 | (13) |
| 2019–2021 | Nagoya Grampus | 77 | (7) |
| 2022–2023 | Hokkaido Consadole Sapporo | 26 | (3) |
| 2023 | Chapecoense | 9 | (1) |
| 2024 | Fagiano Okayama | 6 | (1) |
| Total | | 267 | (36) |
- * Club domestic league appearances and goals

Gabriel Augusto Xavier (born 15 July 1993), known as Gabriel Xavier or simply Gabriel, is a Brazilian former professional footballer who plays as an attacking midfielder.

== Club career ==
=== Portuguesa ===
Born in São Paulo, Gabriel played for Corinthians and São Paulo's youth systems, but was released by the latter in December 2011 due to his height. He then graduated from Portuguesa's youth categories, and made his first team debut on 28 August 2013, playing the last 12 minutes of a 0–0 draw at Bahia for that year's Copa Sudamericana.

On 25 January 2014 Gabriel played his second game for Lusa, coming on as a late substitute in a 0–1 loss at XV de Piracicaba. Roughly a month later he scored his first professional goal, netting the winner in a 2–1 home success over Comercial.

In 2014 Série B, Gabriel was an undisputed starter for the club, appearing in 29 matches and scoring four goals, but his side was eventually relegated. He was also elected as one of the ten newcomers of the campaign by Globo Esporte.

=== Cruzeiro ===
On 10 February 2015 Gabriel agreed his wages with Cruzeiro, with an agreement between Raposa and Portuguesa being reached three days later. He was presented on the 19th, signing a four-year deal.

Gabriel made his debut for Raposa on 28 February 2015, playing the last 22 minutes in a 3–0 away win against Tupi. His Série A debut on 10 May, starting in a 0–1 home loss against Corinthians.

Gabriel scored his first goal in the main category of Brazilian football on 6 June 2015, netting his team's second in a 3–1 away win against fierce rivals Atlético Mineiro.

=== Nagoya Grampus ===
On 18 July 2017, Gabriel signed for Nagoya Grampus on loan. extending his loan deal until the end of the 2018 season on 26 December 2017.

On 28 December 2018, Gabriel signed permanently for Nagoya Grampus.

== Career statistics ==
Appearances and goals by club, season and competition
| Club | Season | League | | | State League | | National cup | | League cup | | Continental | | Other | | Total | |
| Club | Season | Division | Apps | Goals | Apps | Goals | Apps | Goals | Apps | Goals | Apps | Goals | Apps | Goals | Apps | Goals |
|---|---|---|---|---|---|---|---|---|---|---|---|---|---|---|---|---|
| Portuguesa | 2013 | Série A | 0 | 0 | — | | — | | — | | 1 (Note: Appearance in the Copa Sudamericana) | 0 | — | | 1 | 0 |
| Portuguesa | 2014 | Série B | 29 | 4 | 10 (Note: Appearances in the Campeonato Paulista) | 2 | 2 | 0 | — | | — | | — | | 41 | 6 |
| Portuguesa | Total | | 29 | 4 | 10 | 2 | 2 | 0 | — | | 1 | 0 | 0 | 0 | 42 | 6 |
| Cruzeiro | 2015 | Série A | 12 | 1 | 4 (Note: Appearances in the Campeonato Mineiro) | 0 | 0 | 0 | — | | 7 (Note: Appearances in the Copa Libertadores) | 0 | — | | 23 | 1 |
| Cruzeiro | 2016 | Série A | — | | 2 | 0 | — | | — | | — | | 1 (Note: Appearance in Primeira Liga) | 0 | 3 | 0 |
| Cruzeiro | Total | | 12 | 1 | 6 | 0 | 0 | 0 | — | | 7 | 0 | 1 | 0 | 26 | 1 |
| Sport (loan) | 2016 | Série A | 28 | 3 | 8 (Note: Appearances in the Campeonato Pernambucano) | 1 | 0 | 0 | — | | 2 | 0 | 4 (Note: Appearances in the Copa do Nordeste) | 0 | 42 | 4 |
| Vitória (loan) | 2017 | Série A | 7 | 0 | 4 (Note: Appearances in the Campeonato Baiano) | 0 | 3 | 0 | — | | — | | 6 | 1 | 20 | 1 |
| Nagoya Grampus (loan) | 2017 | J2 League | 16 | 7 | — | | 0 | 0 | — | | — | | 2 (Note: Appearances in the J1 League play off) | 0 | 18 | 7 |
| Nagoya Grampus (loan) | 2018 | J1 League | 29 | 6 | — | | 1 | 1 | 0 | 0 | — | | — | | 30 | 7 |
| Nagoya Grampus | 2019 | J1 League | 32 | 3 | — | | 0 | 0 | 3 (Note: Appearances in the J.League Cup) | 0 | — | | — | | 35 | 3 |
| Nagoya Grampus | 2020 | J1 League | 25 | 4 | — | | 0 | 0 | 3 | 1 | — | | — | | 28 | 5 |
| Nagoya Grampus | 2021 | J1 League | 20 | 0 | — | | 2 | 0 | 3 | 0 | 1 (Note: Appearances in the AFC Champions League) | 0 | — | | 26 | 0 |
| Nagoya Grampus | Nagoya total | | 122 | 20 | — | | 3 | 1 | 9 | 1 | 1 | 0 | 2 | 0 | 136 | 22 |
| Consadole Sapporo | 2022 | J1 League | 26 | 3 | — | | 2 | 0 | 6 | 2 | — | | — | | 34 | 5 |
| Chapecoense | 2023 | Série B | 9 | 1 | — | | — | | — | | — | | — | | 9 | 1 |
| Fagiano Okayama | 2024 | J2 League | 6 | 1 | — | | 0 | 0 | 0 | 0 | — | | 0 | 0 | 6 | 1 |
| Career total | | | 239 | 33 | 28 | 3 | 10 | 1 | 15 | 3 | 11 | 0 | 13 | 3 | 316 | 43 |

== Honours ==
Vitória

- Campeonato Baiano: 2017

Nagoya Grampus

- J.League Cup: 2021
