= Shunsuke Kikuchi (footballer) =

Japanese footballer

Shunsuke Kikuchi 菊地 俊介
Personal information
- Full name: Shunsuke Kikuchi
- Date of birth: 4 October 1991 (age 35)
- Place of birth: Saitama, Saitama, Japan
- Height: 1.80 m (5 ft 11 in)
- Position: Midfielder

Youth career
- 2007–2009: Inabe Gakuen Sogo High School

College career
Years	Team	Apps	(Gls)
2010–2013	Nippon Sport Science University		

Senior career*
Years	Team	Apps	(Gls)
2014–2019	Shonan Bellmare	133	(22)
2020–2022	Omiya Ardija	66	(8)
2023–2024	Ehime FC	32	(4)
Medal record
Shonan Bellmare
Winner	J.League Cup	2018
- * Club domestic league appearances and goals as of 26 December 2024, 18:24 (UTC)

Shunsuke Kikuchi (菊地 俊介, Kikuchi Shunsuke; born October 4, 1991) in Saitama, Saitama, Japan is a former Japanese professional footballer who plays as a midfielder.

== Career ==
Kikuchi began his youth career with Inabe Gakuen Sogo High School, where he played and studied from 2007 to 2009. From 2010 to 2013, he played university football with Nippon Sport Science University.

Kikuchi began his professional career with Shonan Bellmare on 2014. Kikuchi left after six years at Shonan.

On 2020, Kikuchi joined J2 club Omiya Ardija. On 14 November 2022, Omiya announced his contract would not be renewed for the 2023 season.

Eventually, on 2023, he was transferred to J3 club Ehime FC.

On 15 November 2024, Kikuchi was announce that would be leaving for Ehime due to the expiration of contract.

On 15 January 2025, Kikuchi announce retirement from football after 10 years as professional career.

== Career statistics ==
=== Club ===
As of the end 2024 season.

Club performance			League		Cup		League Cup		Total	
Season	Club	League	Apps	Goals	Apps	Goals	Apps	Goals	Apps	Goals
Club			League		Emperor's Cup		J. League Cup		Total	
2014	Shonan Bellmare	J.League Div 2	30	3	2	1	–		32	4
2015	Shonan Bellmare	J1 League	30	1	2	1	3	0	35	2
2016	Shonan Bellmare	J1 League	7	0	2	1	0	0	9	1
2017	Shonan Bellmare	J2 League	23	8	0	0	–		23	8
2018	Shonan Bellmare	J1 League	26	7	0	0	6	1	32	8
2019	Shonan Bellmare	J1 League	17	3	0	0	2	1	19	4
2020	Omiya Ardija	J2 League	23	2	0	0	–		23	2
2021	Omiya Ardija	J2 League	16	2	0	0	0	0	16	2
2022	Omiya Ardija	J2 League	27	4	2	1	0	0	29	5
2023	Ehime FC	J3 League	2	2	0	0	–		2	2
2023	Ehime FC	J2 League	30	2	2	0	1	0	33	2
Career total			201	32	8	4	11	2	220	38

== Honours ==
=== Nippon Sport Science University ===
- Kanto Soccer League Div 2 (1): 2011

=== Shonan Bellmare ===
- J2 League (2): 2014, 2017
- J.League Cup (1): 2018

=== Ehime FC ===
- J3 League (1): 2023
