= Kazuki Kushibiki =

Japanese footballer (born 1993)

Kazuki Kushibiki 櫛引 一紀
Personal information
- Full name: Kazuki Kushibiki
- Date of birth: 12 February 1993 (age 33)
- Place of birth: Noboribetsu, Japan
- Height: 1.78 m (5 ft 10 in)
- Position: Centre back

Team information
- Current team: FC Imabari
- Number: 35

Youth career
- –2004: Tonkeshi Junior Kickers
- 2005–2007: Ryokuyo Junior High School
- 2008–2010: Otani Muroran High School

Senior career*
Years	Team	Apps	(Gls)
2011–2017	Hokkaido Consadole Sapporo	119	(1)
2017	→ Nagoya Grampus (loan)	36	(1)
2018–2019	Nagoya Grampus	21	(0)
2019	→ Omiya Ardija (loan)	19	(1)
2020	Sanfrecce Hiroshima	2	(0)
2021	Omiya Ardija	21	(0)
2022–2026	V-Varen Nagasaki	114	(6)
2026–	FC Imabari	2	(0)
- * Club domestic league appearances and goals as of 17 August 2026

Kazuki Kushibiki (櫛引 一紀 | born 12 February 1993) is a Japanese football player who plays as a centre back for FC Imabari.

== Career ==
In December 2016, Kushibiki joined Nagoya Grampus on loan. He made his league debut against Fagiano Okayama on 26th February 2017. Kushibiki scored his first goal for Nagoya against Kamatamare Sanuki on 19th November 2017, scoring in the 69th minute.

On 19 December 2017, Kushibiki was announced at Nagoya Grampus on a permanent deal.

On 25 July 2019, Kushibiki joined Omiya Ardija on a six month loan.

Kushibiki signed for Sanfreece Hiroshima. He made his league debut against Vegalta Sendai on 31 October 2020.

On 6 January 2022, Kushibiki signed for V-Varen Nagasaki. He made his league debut against Thespakusatsu Gunma on 30 March 2022, coming on in a 3–2 win in the 90th+1st minute for Shunya Yoneda. He scored his first league goals against Tokushima Vortis on 16th April 2023, scoring a brace

== Career statistics ==
=== Club ===
Updated to 21 February 2019.

Appearances and goals by club, season and competition
Club	Season	League			National Cup		League Cup		Continental		Other		Total	
Club	Season	Division	Apps	Goals	Apps	Goals	Apps	Goals	Apps	Goals	Apps	Goals	Apps	Goals
Consadole Sapporo	2011	J2 League	13	0	0	0	-		-		-		13	0
Consadole Sapporo	2012	J1 League	11	0	0	0	6	0	-		-		17	0
Consadole Sapporo	2013	J2 League	17	0	1	0	-		-		-		18	0
Consadole Sapporo	2014	J2 League	24	1	1	0	-		-		-		25	1
Consadole Sapporo	2015	J2 League	37	0	1	0	-		-		-		38	0
Consadole Sapporo	2016	J2 League	17	0	1	0	-		-		-		18	0
Nagoya Grampus	2017	J2 League	34	1	3	0	–		–		2	0	39	1
Nagoya Grampus	2018	J1 League	20	0	2	0	4	0	–		–		26	0
Career total			173	2	9	0	10	0	-	-	2	0	194	2

== Honours ==
Consadole Sapporo

- J2 League (1): 2016
