= Kanta Kajiyama =

Japanese footballer

Kanta Kajiyama 梶山 幹太
Personal information
- Full name: Kanta Kajiyama
- Date of birth: April 24, 1998 (age 28)
- Place of birth: Niigata, Japan
- Height: 1.67 m (5 ft 5 1/2 in)
- Position: Midfielder

Team information
- Current team: SC Sagamihara
- Number: 7

Youth career
- Nagoya Grampus

Senior career*
Years	Team	Apps	(Gls)
2017–	Nagoya Grampus	0	(0)
2018–	→ SC Sagamihara (loan)	11	(0)
- * Club domestic league appearances and goals as of 23 December 2018

Kanta Kajiyama (梶山 幹太, Kajiyama Kanta; born April 24, 1998) is a Japanese football player for Veroskronos Tsuno.

== Career ==
After being raised by Nagoya Grampus U-18, Kajiyama was promoted to the top team in 2017 and then loaned to SC Sagamihara in September 2018.

== Career statistics ==
Updated to 3 September 2018.

Appearances and goals by club, season and competition
Club	Season	League			Emperor's Cup		J.League Cup		Total	
Club	Season	Division	Apps	Goals	Apps	Goals	Apps	Goals	Apps	Goals
Nagoya Grampus	2017	J2 League	0	0	0	0	–		0	0
Nagoya Grampus	2018	J1 League	0	0	1	0	2	0	3	0
SC Sagamihara	2018	J3 League	2	0	–		–		2	0
Career total			2	0	1	0	2	0	5	0
