= Toshiya Takagi =

Japanese footballer

Personal information
- Full name: Toshiya Takagi
- Date of birth: 25 November 1992 (age 33)
- Place of birth: Fujisawa, Kanagawa, Japan
- Height: 1.78 m (5 ft 10 in)
- Position: Left back

Youth career
- 2011–2014: Kanagawa University

Senior career*
Years	Team	Apps	(Gls)
2015–2017	Montedio Yamagata	89	(1)
2018	JEF United Chiba	14	(2)
2018–2019	Kashiwa Reysol	17	(0)
2019–2021	Matsumoto Yamaga	17	(0)
2021–2022	Ehime	33	(1)
2023	Tiffy Army	8	(2)
- * Club domestic league appearances and goals as of 00:11, 23 November 2019 (UTC)

Toshiya Takagi (高木 利弥, Takagi Toshiya; born 25 November 1992) is a Japanese footballer who plays as a defender.

His father Takuya is a former professional footballer.

== Career ==
=== Montedio Yamagata ===
Takagi made his official debut for Montedio Yamagata in the J1 League, on 18 March 2015 against Shimizu S-Pulse in ND Soft Stadium Yamagata in Tendō, Japan. He started and played the full match recording a yellow card in the 91st. Takagi and his club won the match 3-1.

== Club career statistics ==
Updated to end of 2018 season.

Club performance			League		Cup		League Cup		Total	
Season	Club	League	Apps	Goals	Apps	Goals	Apps	Goals	Apps	Goals
Japan			League		Emperor's Cup		J. League Cup		Total	
2015	Montedio Yamagata	J1 League	20	0	3	1	3	0	26	1
2016	Montedio Yamagata	J2 League	33	0	3	0	–		36	0
2017	Montedio Yamagata	J2 League	36	1	1	0	–		37	1
2018	JEF United Chiba	J2 League	14	2	1	0	–		15	2
2018	Kashiwa Reysol	J1 League	17	0	0	0	3	0	20	0
Total			120	3	8	1	6	0	134	4
