= Yosuke Akiyama =

Japanese footballer (born 1995)

Yosuke Akiyama 秋山 陽介
Personal information
- Full name: Yosuke Akiyama
- Date of birth: April 13, 1995 (age 31)
- Place of birth: Chiba, Japan
- Height: 1.70 m (5 ft 7 in)
- Position: Midfielder

Youth career
- 2014–2017: Waseda University

Senior career*
Years	Team	Apps	(Gls)
2017–2020	Nagoya Grampus	34	(1)
2019	→ Júbilo Iwata (loan)	8	(0)
2021–2023	Vegalta Sendai	20	(0)
2022	→ JEF United Chiba (loan)	26	(0)
2024–2025	Fukushima United	5	(0)
2025–2026	Wollongong United	45	(6)
2027–	Rockdale Ilinden	0	(0)
- * Club domestic league appearances and goals as of 22:49, 15 December 2023 (UTC)

Yosuke Akiyama (秋山 陽介, Akiyama Yosuke; born April 13, 1995) is a Japanese football player who currently join for Rockdale Ilinden in 2027 National Premier Leagues NSW Men's in Australia.

== Career ==
Yosuke Akiyama joined J2 League club Nagoya Grampus in 2017. Yosuke made his debut for Nagoya against Ehime FC on 6 August 2017. Yosuke scored his first goal for the club against Zweigen Kanazawa on 17 September 2017, scoring in the 58th minute.

Akiyama made his debut for Jubilo against Vegalta Sendai on 3 August 2019.

Akiyama made his debut for Vegalta on 27 February 2021 against Sanfrecce Hiroshima.

Akiyama made his debut for JEF against Tochigi SC on 26 March 2022.

Akiyama made his debut for Fukushima United in 2024.

== Career statistics ==
Updated to 9 December 2022.

Appearances and goals by club, season and competition
Club	Season	League			Emperor's Cup		J.League Cup		Total	
Club	Season	Division	Apps	Goals	Apps	Goals	Apps	Goals	Apps	Goals
Nagoya Grampus	2017	J2 League	9	1	1	0	—		10	1
Nagoya Grampus	2018	J1 League	22	0	1	0	5	0	28	0
Júbilo Iwata (loan)	2019	J1 League	8	0	—		—		8	0
Nagoya Grampus	2019	J1 League	0	0	1	0	2	0	3	0
Nagoya Grampus	2020	J1 League	3	0	—		2	0	5	0
Vegalta Sendai	2021	J1 League	3	0	0	0	0	0	3	0
JEF United Chiba (loan)	2022	J2 League	26	0	1	0	—		27	0
Total			71	1	4	0	9	0	84	1
