= Yuki Ogaki =

Japanese footballer

Yuki Ogaki 大垣 勇樹
Personal information
- Full name: Yuki Ogaki
- Date of birth: February 28, 2000 (age 26)
- Place of birth: Osaka, Japan
- Height: 1.75 m (5 ft 9 in)
- Position: Forward

Team information
- Current team: Reilac Shiga FC
- Number: 18

Youth career
- Ikenosato JSC
- Hirakata FC
- 2015–2017: Kokoku High School

Senior career*
Years	Team	Apps	(Gls)
2018–2021	Nagoya Grampus	0	(0)
2019-2020	→ Grulla Morioka (loan)	33	(3)
2021	FK RFS	0	(0)
2021	→ BFC Daugavpils (loan)	18	(2)
2022–2023	FC Tiamo Hirakata	36	(4)
2023-	Reilac Shiga FC	12	(5)
Total		99	(14)
- * Club domestic league appearances and goals as of 22:42, 12 March 2023 (UTC)

Yuki Ogaki (大垣 勇樹, Ōgaki Yūki; born February 28, 2000) is a Japanese footballer who plays as a forward for JFL club FC Tiamo Hirakata.

== Playing career ==
Ogaki was born in Osaka Prefecture on February 28, 2000. After graduating from high school, he joined J1 League club Nagoya Grampus in 2018.

== Career statistics ==
Last update: 30 August 2021

Club performance			League		Cup		Other		Total	
Season	Club	League	Apps	Goals	Apps	Goals	Apps	Goals	Apps	Goals
Japan			League		Emperor's Cup		League Cup		Total	
2018	Nagoya Grampus	J1 League	0	0	0	0	2	0	2	0
2019	Nagoya Grampus	J1 League	0	0	0	0	1	0	1	0
2019	Grulla Morioka (Loan)	J3 League	12	2	0	0	0	0	12	2
2020	Grulla Morioka (Loan)	J3 League	21	1	0	0	0	0	21	1
Latvia			League		Latvian Football Cup		Other		Total	
2021	FK RFS	Latvian Higher League	0	0	0	0	0	0	0	0
2021	BFC Daugavpils (Loan)	Latvian Higher League	18	2	2	0	0	0	20	2
Career total			47	4	2	0	3	0	52	4
