= Shumpei Naruse =

Japanese footballer

Shumpei Naruse 成瀬 竣平
Personal information
- Full name: Shumpei Naruse
- Date of birth: 17 January 2001 (age 25)
- Place of birth: Aichi, Japan
- Height: 1.65 m (5 ft 5 in)
- Position: Right back

Team information
- Current team: Nankatsu SC
- Number: 44

Youth career
- Seto FC
- Nagoya Grampus

Senior career*
| Years | Team | Apps | (Gls) |
| 2018–2024 | Nagoya Grampus | 45 | (0) |
| 2022 | → Fagiano Okayama (loan) | 31 | (0) |
| 2023 | → Montedio Yamagata (loan) | 2 | (0) |
| 2023 | → Mito HollyHock (loan) | 15 | (0) |
| 2024 | → V-Varen Nagasaki (loan) | 1 | (0) |
| 2025–2026 | Kashiwa Reysol | 1 | (0) |
| 2026– | Nankatsu SC | 5 | (0) |
- * Club domestic league appearances and goals as of 16:20, 13 October 2026 (UTC)

Shumpei Naruse (成瀬 竣平, Naruse Shunpei; born 17 January 2001) is a Japanese footballer who plays as a right back for Nankatsu SC.

== Career ==
=== Club ===
Naruse made his debut for Nagoya Grampus on 7 March 2018, against Urawa Red Diamonds in the J.League Cup, with his League debut coming on 18 March 2018, coming on as a 76th minute substitute for Jô in Nagoya Grampus' 1-0 defeat to Kawasaki Frontale.

== Career statistics ==
=== Club ===
As of 13 October 2026.

Appearances and goals by club, season and competition
| Club | Season | League | | | National cup (Note: Includes Emperor's Cup) | | League cup (Note: Includes J.League Cup) | | Continental | | Other | | Total | |
| Club | Season | Division | Apps | Goals | Apps | Goals | Apps | Goals | Apps | Goals | Apps | Goals | Apps | Goals |
|---|---|---|---|---|---|---|---|---|---|---|---|---|---|---|
| Nagoya Grampus | 2018 | J1 League | 1 | 0 | 0 | 0 | 5 | 0 | 0 | 0 | – | | 6 | 0 |
| Nagoya Grampus | 2019 | J1 League | 1 | 0 | 0 | 0 | 1 | 0 | 0 | 0 | – | | 2 | 0 |
| Nagoya Grampus | 2020 | J1 League | 25 | 0 | 0 | 0 | 3 | 0 | 0 | 0 | – | | 28 | 0 |
| Nagoya Grampus | 2021 | J1 League | 18 | 0 | 2 | 0 | 2 | 0 | 3 (Note: Appearances in AFC Champions League) | 0 | – | | 25 | 0 |
| Nagoya Grampus | 2022 | J1 League | 0 | 0 | 0 | 0 | 2 | 0 | 0 | 0 | – | | 2 | 0 |
| Nagoya Grampus | Total | | 45 | 0 | 2 | 0 | 13 | 0 | 3 | 0 | 0 | 0 | 63 | 0 |
| Fagiano Okayama (loan) | 2022 | J2 League | 31 | 0 | 1 | 0 | – | | – | | 1 (Note: Appearance in J1/J2 play-offs) | 0 | 33 | 0 |
| Montedio Yamagata (loan) | 2023 | J2 League | 2 | 0 | – | | – | | – | | – | | 2 | 0 |
| Mito HollyHock (loan) | 2023 | J2 League | 15 | 0 | 1 | 0 | – | | – | | – | | 16 | 0 |
| V-Varen Nagasaki (loan) | 2024 | J2 League | 1 | 0 | 3 | 0 | 2 | 0 | – | | 0 | 0 | 6 | 0 |
| Kashiwa Reysol | 2025 | J1 League | 1 | 0 | 1 | 0 | 3 | 0 | – | | – | | 5 | 0 |
| Kashiwa Reysol | 2026 | J1 (100) | 0 | 0 | – | | – | | – | | – | | 0 | 0 |
| Kashiwa Reysol | Total | | 1 | 0 | 1 | 0 | 3 | 0 | 0 | 0 | 0 | 0 | 5 | 0 |
| Nankatsu SC | 2026 | KSL | 5 | 0 | – | | – | | – | | – | | 5 | 0 |
| Career total | | | 100 | 0 | 8 | 0 | 18 | 0 | 3 | 0 | 1 | 0 | 130 | 0 |
