= Shumpei Fukahori =

Japanese footballer

Shumpei Fukahori 深堀 隼平
Personal information
- Full name: Shumpei Fukahori
- Date of birth: June 29, 1998 (age 28)
- Place of birth: Nagakute, Aichi, Japan
- Height: 1.78 m (5 ft 10 in)
- Position: Midfielder

Team information
- Current team: Iwate Grulla Morioka
- Number: 7

Youth career
- 2014–2016: Nagoya Grampus

Senior career*
Years	Team	Apps	(Gls)
2017–2020	Nagoya Grampus	8	(0)
2019	→ Vitória Guimarães B (loan)	4	(0)
2020	→ Mito HollyHock (loan)	20	(5)
2021	Mito HollyHock	12	(1)
2021	→ FC Gifu (loan)	14	(3)
2022–	Thespakusatsu Gunma	29	(2)
2023	→ Ehime FC (loan)	26	(6)
2024–	Iwate Grulla Morioka	0	(0)
- * Club domestic league appearances and goals as of 00:07, 21 January 2024 (UTC)

Shumpei Fukahori (深堀 隼平, Fukahori Shumpei; born June 29, 1998) is a Japanese footballer currently playing for Iwate Grulla Morioka.

== Early life ==
Shumpei was born in Nagakute.

== Career ==
Shumpei Fukahori joined J2 League club Nagoya Grampus in 2017. He made his league debut for the club against V-Varen Nagasaki on the 25 June 2017.

On 24 January 2019, Fukahori joined Vitória de Guimarães on loan until 31 July 2019. He made his league debut for the club's reserve side against S.C. Covilhã.

Shumpei made his league debut for Mito against Omiya Ardija on the 23 February 2020. He scored his first goal for the club against Montedio Yamagata on the 21 October 2020, scoring in the 80th minute.

Shumpei made his league debut for Gifu against Fukushima United on the 28 August 2021. He scored his first goal for the club on the 4 September 2021, scoring against YSCC Yokohama in the 49th minute.

Shumpei made his league debut for Thespa Gunma against Montedio Yamagata on the 19 February 2022. He scored his first goal for the club on the 3 April 2022, scoring against Mito Hollyhock in the 19th minute.

Shumpei made his league debut for Ehime against Iwate Grulla Morioka on the 5 March 2023. Shumpei scored his first goals for Ehime, a hattrick against Kataller Toyama, on the 9 July 2023.

== Career statistics ==
=== Club ===
As of match played 20 May 2018.

Appearances and goals by club, season and competition
Club	Season	League			National Cup		League Cup		Continental		Other		Total	
Club	Season	Division	Apps	Goals	Apps	Goals	Apps	Goals	Apps	Goals	Apps	Goals	Apps	Goals
Nagoya Grampus	2017	J2 League	2	0	0	0	-		-		0	0	2	0
Nagoya Grampus	2018	J1 League	4	0	1	1	4	2	-		-		9	3
Nagoya Grampus	Total		6	0	1	1	4	2	-	-	0	0	11	3
Vitória de Guimarães (loan)	2018–19	Primeira Liga	0	0	0	0	0	0	–		–		0	10
Career total			6	0	1	1	4	2	-	-	0	0	11	3

== Honours ==
Ehime

- J3 League: 2023
