= Yuki Kobayashi (footballer, born 1988) =

Japanese footballer

Yuki Kobayashi 小林 裕紀
Personal information
- Full name: Yuki Kobayashi
- Date of birth: October 18, 1988 (age 38)
- Place of birth: Asao-ku, Kawasaki, Japan
- Height: 1.80 m (5 ft 11 in)
- Position: Midfielder

Team information
- Current team: Oita Trinita
- Number: 6

Youth career
- 2004–2007: Tokyo Verdy Youth
- 2007–2010: Meiji University

Senior career*
Years	Team	Apps	(Gls)
2011–2013	Júbilo Iwata	96	(3)
2014–2016	Albirex Niigata	75	(0)
2017–2019	Nagoya Grampus	63	(2)
2019–	Oita Trinita	64	(0)
- * Club domestic league appearances and goals as of 01:50, 2 August 2022

Yuki Kobayashi (小林 裕紀, Kobayashi Yūki; born October 18, 1988) is a Japanese footballer who plays as a defensive midfielder for Oita Trinita.

== Club statistics ==
Updated to 1 August 2022.

Club performance			League		Cup		League Cup		Other		Total	
Season	Club	League	Apps	Goals	Apps	Goals	Apps	Goals	Apps	Goals	Apps	Goals
Japan			League		Emperor's Cup		J. League Cup		Other^{1}		Total	
2007	Meiji University	-	–		2	0	–		–		2	0
2009	Meiji University	-	–		4	0	–		–		4	0
2011	Júbilo Iwata	J1 League	33	0	2	0	4	1	1	0	40	1
2012	Júbilo Iwata	J1 League	32	2	2	0	3	0	–		37	2
2013	Júbilo Iwata	J1 League	31	1	1	0	5	0	–		37	1
2014	Albirex Niigata	J1 League	25	0	2	0	3	0	–		30	0
2015	Albirex Niigata	J1 League	21	0	1	0	6	0	–		28	0
2016	Albirex Niigata	J1 League	29	0	2	0	5	0	–		36	0
2017	Nagoya Grampus	J2 League	26	1	2	0	–		2	0	30	1
2018	Nagoya Grampus	J1 League	32	1	1	0	4	0	–		37	1
2019	Nagoya Grampus	J1 League	5	0	1	0	7	0	–		13	0
2019	Oita Trinita	J1 League	11	0	–		–		–		11	0
2020	Oita Trinita	J1 League	12	0	–		1	0	–		13	0
2021	Oita Trinita	J1 League	25	0	3	0	2	0	–		30	0
2022	Oita Trinita	J2 League	16	0	1	0	2	0	–		19	0
Total			298	5	24	0	42	1	3	0	367	6

^{1}Includes Suruga Bank Championship and J2 Play-offs.
