= 2023 Júbilo Iwata season =

Júbilo Iwata
2023 season
- Chairman: Yoshirou Takahira
- Manager: Akinobu Yokouchi
- Stadium: Yamaha Stadium
- J2 League: 2nd (promoted)
- Emperor's Cup: Third round
- J.League Cup: Group stage
Home colours	Away colours

The 2023 season was Júbilo Iwata's 51st season in existence and the club's first season back in the second division of Japanese football. In addition to the domestic league, Júbilo Iwata participated in this season's edition of the Emperor's Cup.

== Players ==
=== Current squad ===
As of 1 January 2024

Note: Flags indicate national team as defined under FIFA eligibility rules; some limited exceptions apply. Players may hold more than one non-FIFA nationality.

No.	Pos.	Nation	Player
1	GK	JPN	Naoki Hatta
2	DF	JPN	Norimichi Yamamoto
3	DF	JPN	Riku Morioka
4	DF	JPN	Ko Matsubara
5	DF	JPN	Daiki Ogawa
6	DF	JPN	Makito Ito
7	MF	JPN	Rikiya Uehara
8	MF	JPN	Kotaro Omori
9	FW	BRA	Matheus Peixoto
10	MF	JPN	Hiroki Yamada
13	DF	JPN	Kotaro Fujikawa
14	MF	JPN	Masaya Matsumoto
15	DF	JPN	Kaito Suzuki
17	MF	JPN	Yuto Suzuki
18	FW	JPN	Ryo Germain
21	GK	JPN	Ryuki Miura
23	MF	JPN	Kosuke Yamamoto
27	MF	JPN	Mahiro Yoshinaga
28	MF	JPN	Naoki Kanuma

No.	Pos.	Nation	Player
29	FW	COL	Fabián González
31	MF	JPN	Yosuke Furukawa
33	MF	BRA	Dudu
34	MF	JPN	Takeaki Harigaya
36	DF	BRA	Ricardo Graça
38	MF	JPN	Kensuke Fujiwara
39	DF	JPN	Ryo Takano
40	MF	JPN	Shota Kaneko
42	FW	JPN	Keisuke Goto
44	MF	JPN	Hiroto Uemura ^{DSP}
45	MF	JPN	Kanta Saito ^{Type 2}
46	MF	JPN	Ryosuke Ito ^{Type 2}
47	FW	JPN	Kyota Funahashi ^{Type 2}
48	MF	JPN	Tokumo Kawai ^{Type 2}
49	MF	PRK	Ri Kyong-su ^{Type 2}
50	MF	JPN	Yasuhito Endō
77	MF	JPN	Yūki Ōtsu
81	GK	JPN	Yuji Kajikawa
—	MF	PRK	Choe Song-hyok

=== Out on loan ===
Note: Flags indicate national team as defined under FIFA eligibility rules; some limited exceptions apply. Players may hold more than one non-FIFA nationality.

No.	Pos.	Nation	Player
—	DF	JPN	So Nakagawa (at Fujieda MYFC)
—	MF	JPN	Naoya Seita (at Fukushima United)

No.	Pos.	Nation	Player
—	FW	JPN	Naoto Miki (at Fukushima United)
—	FW	JPN	Kenyu Sugimoto (at Yokohama F. Marinos)

== Transfers ==
Due to a ban imposed by FIFA, after an illegal breach of contract between Fabián González and an unnamed Thai club, Júbilo is unable to make any new signings from outside of the 2022 club system during both transfer windows of the 2023 season. Players out on loan can normally return to the club, and free transfers are allowed. Tokyo International University graduate Shu Morooka was scheduled to join Júbilo for the 2023 season, but as the club received a transfer ban, his provisional contract with Júbilo was cancelled, and he later joined Kashima Antlers. The club filed an appeal about the CAS decision over the subject, but it was denied.

Transfers in
Join on	Pos.	Player	Moving from	Transfer type
Pre-season	DF	(Japan) So Nakagawa	(Japan) FC Ryukyu	Loan return
Pre-season	DF	(Japan) Kaito Suzuki	(Japan) Tochigi SC	Loan return
Pre-season	MF	(Japan) Kotaro Fujikawa	(Japan) Giravanz Kitakyushu	Loan return
Pre-season	MF	(Japan) Takeaki Harigaya	(Japan) Giravanz Kitakyushu	Loan return
Pre-season	FW	(Japan) Kenyu Sugimoto	(Japan) Urawa Red Diamonds	Free transfer
Pre-season	FW	(Japan) Keisuke Goto	Júbilo Iwata U18s	Promotion

Transfers out
Leave on	Pos.	Player	Moving to	Transfer type
21 Mar	FW	(Japan) Kenyu Sugimoto	(Japan) Yokohama F. Marinos	Loan transfer
Pre-season	GK	(Moldova) Alexei Koșelev	(Greece) Lamia	Free transfer
Pre-season	DF	(Japan) Kentaro Oi	(Australia) Eastern Lions	Full transfer
Pre-season	MF	(Japan) Atsushi Kurokawa	(Japan) Machida Zelvia	Full transfer
Pre-season	MF	(Japan) Yutaro Hakamata	(Japan) Omiya Ardija	Full transfer
Pre-season	FW	(Japan) Naoto Miki	(Japan) Fukushima United	Loan transfer

== Pre-season and friendlies ==
Win Draw Loss

26 January Training match	Júbilo Iwata	4–0	NIFS Kanoya	Kagoshima
	Germain; Fujiwara; Goto; Kanuma	Report		Stadium: Shiranami Stadium
Note: The match was played with three halves of 30 minutes each.

28 January Training match	Júbilo Iwata	0–3	Oita Trinita	Kagoshima
		Report	Fujimoto 50', 56'; Ando 59'	Stadium: Shiranami Stadium
Note: The match was played with three halves of 45 minutes each.

1 February Training match	Júbilo Iwata	2–1	Iwaki FC	Kagoshima
	Germain; Funahashi	Report	?	Stadium: Shiranami Stadium
Note: The match was played with three halves of 45 minutes each.

4 February Training match	Júbilo Iwata	0–3	Shimizu S-Pulse	Kagoshima
		Report	Disaro 21' (pen.), 29'; Thiago Santana 88'	Stadium: Shiranami Stadium
Note: The match was played with two halves of 45 minutes each.

4 February Training match	Júbilo Iwata	1–0	Shimizu S-Pulse	Kagoshima
	Yoshinaga 51'	Report		Stadium: Shiranami Stadium
Note: The match was played with two halves of 45 minutes each.

19 February Training match	Júbilo Iwata	8–0	Suzuka Point Getters	Iwata
17:00	Lasso 5', 38' (pen.); Kaneko 37', 46'; Furukawa 49', 90+1'; Harigaya 67', 75'	Report		Stadium: Yamaha Okubo Ground
Note: The match was played with two halves of 45 minutes each.

27 February Training match	Júbilo Iwata	4–1	Shizuoka Sangyo University	Iwata
17:00	Lasso 19'; Yamamoto 31'; Fujikawa 52'; ? 89' (o.g.)	Report	? 90+2'	Stadium: Yamaha Okubo Ground
Note: The match was played with two halves of 45 minutes each.

== Competitions ==
=== Overview ===
Competition	First match	Last match	Starting round	Final position	Record							
Competition	First match	Last match	Starting round	Final position	Pld	W	D	L	GF	GA	GD	Win %
J2 League	18 February	12 November	Matchday 1	2nd	42	21	12	9	74	44	+30	50.00
Emperor's Cup	7 June	12 July	Second round	Third round	2	1	0	1	4	5	−1	50.00
J.League Cup	8 March	18 June	Group stage	Group stage	6	2	0	4	8	9	−1	33.33
Total					50	24	12	14	86	58	+28	48.00

Source: Soccerway

=== J2 League ===
==== League table ====
Pos	Team	Pld	W	D	L	GF	GA	GD	Pts	Promotion or relegation
1	Machida Zelvia (C, P)	42	26	9	7	79	35	+44	87	Promotion to the J1 League
2	Júbilo Iwata (P)	42	21	12	9	74	44	+30	75	Promotion to the J1 League
3	Tokyo Verdy (O, P)	42	21	12	9	57	31	+26	75	Qualification for the promotion play-offs
4	Shimizu S-Pulse	42	20	14	8	78	34	+44	74	Qualification for the promotion play-offs
5	Montedio Yamagata	42	21	4	17	64	54	+10	67	Qualification for the promotion play-offs

Source: Meiji Yasuda J2 League, J.League Data Site
Rules for classification: 1) Points; 2) Goal difference; 3) Goals scored; 4) Head-to-head points; 5) Head-to-head goal difference; 6) Head-to-head goal scored; 7) Fair-play points.
(C) Champions; (O) Play-off winners; (P) Promoted

==== Results summary ====
Overall								Home						Away					
Pld	W	D	L	GF	GA	GD	Pts	W	D	L	GF	GA	GD	W	D	L	GF	GA	GD
24	11	8	5	40	27	+13	41	5	6	2	23	17	+6	6	2	3	17	10	+7

Last updated: 5 July 2023.
Source: Soccerway

==== Matches ====
The league fixtures were announced on 20 January 2023.

18 February 1	Júbilo Iwata	2–3	Fagiano Okayama	Iwata
14:04	Sugimoto (yellow card) 45+2'; Goto 89', 90+2'	Report	Sakuragawa 26'; Sakamoto 31'; Mauk (yellow card) 37'; Sano 54'	Stadium: Yamaha Stadium; Attendance: 10,737; Referee: Shu Kawamata

26 March 2	Renofa Yamaguchi	1–1	Júbilo Iwata	Yamaguchi
13:18	Sato (yellow card) 35'; Takahashi (yellow card) 68'; Takagi 85' (pen.)	Report	Y. Suzuki 45+2'; Harigaya (yellow card) 83'; Ito (yellow card) 84'	Stadium: Ishin Me-Life Stadium; Attendance: 5,038; Referee: Koji Takasaki

4 March 3	Júbilo Iwata	2–1	Montedio Yamagata	Iwata
14:03	Germain 38' (pen.); Dudu (yellow card) 66'; Matsumoto 77'	Report	Goto (yellow card) 36'; Konishi (yellow card) 62'; Noda 74'	Stadium: Yamaha Stadium; Attendance: 8,193; Referee: Kazuyoshi Enomoto

11 March 4	Omiya Ardija	1–0	Júbilo Iwata	Saitama
14:03	Kojima (yellow card) 86'; Muroi (yellow card) 90+1'; Angelotti 90+4'	Report	Nakagawa (red card) 90+2'	Stadium: NACK5 Stadium Omiya; Attendance: 8,732; Referee: Dai Matsumoto

18 March 5	Júbilo Iwata	2–2	Shimizu S-Pulse	Fukuroi
14:03	Goto 2' (yellow card) 75'; Matsumoto 66'	Report	Thiago Santana 42', 87' (yellow card) 87'; Ronaldo (yellow card) 83'; Zé Ricardo (man.) (yellow card) 90+5'	Stadium: Ecopa Stadium; Attendance: 22,937; Referee: Hirokazu Otsubo

29 March 6	Júbilo Iwata	2–0	Tochigi SC	Iwata
19:00	Matsumoto 16'; Y. Suzuki (yellow card) 55'; Matsubara 65'	Report	Fukumori (yellow card) 45'	Stadium: Yamaha Stadium; Attendance: 5,868; Referee: Tetsuro Yoshida

1 April 7	Oita Trinita	2–1	Júbilo Iwata	Oita
14:00	Nodake (yellow card) 23'; Shige 39'; Isa 59'	Report	Ricardo Graça (yellow card) 20'; Dudu Pacheco (yellow card) 37'; Uehara 84'	Stadium: Resonac Dome Oita; Attendance: 11,071; Referee: Akihiko Ikeuchi

8 April 8	Mito HollyHock	1–5	Júbilo Iwata	Mito
17:00	Tabinas (yellow card) 27'; Teranuma 70'; Matsuda (yellow card) 90+2'	Report	Dudu Pacheco 8', 16'; Uehara 35'; Matsubara 58'; Goto 59'; Ogawa (yellow card) 84'	Stadium: K's denki Stadium Mito; Attendance: 4,002; Referee: Atsushi Kamimura

12 April 9	Júbilo Iwata	1–1	Machida Zelvia	Iwata
19:00	K. Suzuki (yellow card) 3'; Kaneko 45+2'; Kanuma (yellow card) 69'; Y. Suzuki (yellow card) 82'; Dudu (yellow card) 82'; Yamada (yellow card) 90'	Report	Hirakawa 11' (yellow card) 38'; Popp (yellow card) 50'; Fujiwara (red card) 82'; Carlos (yellow card) 90+4'	Stadium: Yamaha Stadium; Attendance: 5,158; Referee: Yosuke Kubota

16 April 10	Júbilo Iwata	1–1	Roasso Kumamoto	Iwata
16:00	Nakagawa (yellow card) 27'; Kaneko 53'	Report	Matsuoka 12'; Aizawa (yellow card) 15'; Tashiro (yellow card) 36'; Ezaki (yellow card) 88'	Stadium: Yamaha Stadium; Attendance: 7,780; Referee: Keigo Sendachi

23 April 11	Zweigen Kanazawa	1–2	Júbilo Iwata	Kanazawa
14:00	Shoji 50'; Onohara (yellow card) 83'	Report	Yamada 11' (pen.); K. Suzuki 45'	Stadium: Ishikawa Athletics Stadium; Attendance: 5,402; Referee: Kazuyoshi Enomoto

29 April 12	Júbilo Iwata	2–3	Tokushima Vortis	Iwata
14:00	Matsubara 53'; Matsumoto 86'	Report	Mori 2'; Kakitani 20', 60'; Watari (yellow card) 85'	Stadium: Yamaha Stadium; Attendance: 9,280; Referee: Takuto Okabe

3 May 13	Tokyo Verdy	0–0	Júbilo Iwata	Tokyo
17:00	Kato (yellow card) 9'	Report	Uehara (yellow card) 35'; Dudu Pacheco (yellow card) 73'; Germain (yellow card) 79'	Stadium: Ajinomoto Stadium; Attendance: 14,702; Referee: Keisuke Nobori

7 May 14	JEF United Chiba	0–1	Júbilo Iwata	Chiba
19:00	Arai 57'; Takahashi (yellow card) 86'; Kobayashi (yellow card) 89'	Report	Uehara (yellow card) 51'; Germain 70'	Stadium: Fukuda Denshi Arena; Attendance: 6,001; Referee: Shuhei Shimizu

13 May 15	Júbilo Iwata	4–2	Thespakusatsu Gunma	Iwata
14:00	Fujikawa 10'; Yamada 13'; Dudu Pacheco 47'; Germain 56'; Kanuma (yellow card) 86'	Report	Kazama 71'; Sakai 77'	Stadium: Yamaha Stadium; Attendance: 8,963; Referee: Yuzo Sutani

17 May 16	Fujieda MYFC	0–1	Júbilo Iwata	Fujieda
19:00	Kawashima (yellow card) 14'; Watanabe (yellow card) 33' (yellow-red card) 59'; Kubo (yellow card) 41'	Report	Ricardo Graça 67'; Suzuki (yellow card) 84'; Miura (yellow card) 90+2'	Stadium: Fujieda Soccer Stadium; Attendance: 5,696; Referee: Toru Kakinuma

21 May 17	Júbilo Iwata	1–1	Iwaki FC	Iwata
16:00	Yoshinaga (yellow card) 45+1'; Uehara (yellow card) 53'; Dudu Pacheco 81'	Report	Endo 90'	Stadium: Yamaha Stadium; Attendance: 8,443; Referee: Yoshimi Yamashita

27 May 18	V-Varen Nagasaki	2–1	Júbilo Iwata	Isahaya
14:00	Valdo (yellow card) 44'; Yoneda 71', 90+5'	Report	Fujikawa (yellow card) 56'; Germain 76'; Suzuki (yellow card) 83'	Stadium: Transcosmos Stadium Nagasaki; Attendance: 7,074; Referee: Tomokazu Sato

3 June 19	Júbilo Iwata	2–0	Blaublitz Akita	Iwata
16:00	Fujiwara 55'; Uehara 74'; Suzuki (yellow card) 90+1'	Report	Hata (yellow card) 54'; Mikami (yellow card) 90'	Stadium: Yamaha Stadium; Attendance: 7,709; Referee: Atsushi Kamimura

11 June 20	Vegalta Sendai	2–3	Júbilo Iwata	Sendai
13:00	Goke 14'; Endo 90'	Report	Y. Suzuki 2' (yellow card) 30'; Uehara 8'; Goto 76'	Stadium: Yurtec Stadium Sendai; Attendance: 12,753; Referee: Koichiro Fukushima

25 June 22	Roasso Kumamoto	0–2	Júbilo Iwata	Kumamoto
19:00	Kuroki (yellow card) 83'	Report	Dudu Pacheco 2'; Yamada 8'	Stadium: Egao Kenko Stadium; Attendance: 4,696; Referee: Shuhei Shimizu

28 June 21	Júbilo Iwata	1–1	Ventforet Kofu	Iwata
19:00	González 47'; Goto (yellow card) 70'	Report	Hayashida 32' (yellow card) 90+2'	Stadium: Yamaha Stadium; Attendance: 6,162; Referee: Khamis Al-Marri (Qatar)

1 July 23	Júbilo Iwata	1–1	Oita Trinita	Iwata
19:00	Ito (yellow card) 52'; Suzuki 64'	Report	Matsuo 42'; Watanabe (yellow card) 80'	Stadium: Yamaha Stadium; Attendance: 9,517; Referee: Hiroshi Takayama

5 July 24	Júbilo Iwata	2–1	Zweigen Kanazawa	Iwata
19:00	González 7'; Furukawa 54'	Report	Inoue (yellow card) 53'; Toyoda 82'	Stadium: Yamaha Stadium; Attendance: 4,355; Referee: Keigo Sendachi

9 July 25	Montedio Yamagata	1–3	Júbilo Iwata	Tendo
19:00		Report		Stadium: ND Soft Stadium Yamagata

16 July 26	Júbilo Iwata	4–1	Fujieda MYFC	Iwata
19:00		Report		Stadium: Yamaha Stadium

23 July 27	Thespakusatsu Gunma	1–1	Júbilo Iwata	Maebashi
19:00		Report		Stadium: Shoda Shoyu Stadium Gunma

29 July 28	Iwaki FC	0–1	Júbilo Iwata	Iwaki
18:00		Report		Stadium: Iwaki Greenfield Stadium

6 August 29	Júbilo Iwata	4–1	Vegalta Sendai	Iwata
19:00		Report		Stadium: Yamaha Stadium

12 August 30	Machida Zelvia	2–1	Júbilo Iwata	Machida
18:00		Report		Stadium: Machida GION Stadium

19 August 31	Ventforet Kofu	0–1	Júbilo Iwata	Kofu
18:00		Report		Stadium: JIT Recycle Ink Stadium

26 August 32	Júbilo Iwata	2–3	JEF United Chiba	Iwata
19:00		Report		Stadium: Yamaha Stadium

1 September 33	Blaublitz Akita	1–1	Júbilo Iwata	Akita
--:--		Report		Stadium: Soyu Stadium

8 September 34	Júbilo Iwata	3–2	Omiya Ardija	Iwata
--:--		Report		Stadium: Yamaha Stadium

15 September 35	Júbilo Iwata	0–0	Renofa Yamaguchi	Iwata
--:--		Report		Stadium: Yamaha Stadium

23 September 36	Fagiano Okayama	2–1	Júbilo Iwata	Okayama
--:--		Report		Stadium: City Light Stadium

30 September 37	Júbilo Iwata	1–0	V-Varen Nagasaki	Iwata
--:--		Report		Stadium: Yamaha Stadium

6 October 38	Shimizu S-Pulse	1–0	Júbilo Iwata	Shimizu
--:--		Report		Stadium: IAI Stadium Nihondaira

21 October 39	Tokushima Vortis	0–3	Júbilo Iwata	Naruto
--:--		Report		Stadium: Pocarisweat Stadium

27 October 40	Júbilo Iwata	1–1	Tokyo Verdy	Iwata
--:--		Report		Stadium: Yamaha Stadium

3 November 41	Júbilo Iwata	5–0	Mito HollyHock	Iwata
--:--		Report		Stadium: Yamaha Stadium

11 November 42	Tochigi SC	1–2	Júbilo Iwata	Utsunomiya
--:--		Report		Stadium: Tochigi Green Stadium

=== Emperor's Cup ===
Since they are a J2 League club, they were granted a bye from prefectural qualifications and an automatic Second Round spot in the competition.

7 June Second round	Júbilo Iwata	2–0	Kamatamare Sanuki	Iwata
19:00	González 6', 36'; Yamamoto (yellow card) 74'	Report	Mori (yellow card) 56'; Kanai (yellow card) 66'	Stadium: Yamaha Stadium; Attendance: 2,483; Referee: Kentaro Uematsu

12 July Third round	Júbilo Iwata	v	Vissel Kobe	Iwata
19:00		Report		Stadium: Yamaha Stadium

=== J.League Cup ===
Pos	Team	Pld	W	D	L	GF	GA	GD	Pts	Qualification
1	Yokohama F. Marinos	6	5	0	1	14	5	+9	15	Advance to knockout stage
2	Hokkaido Consadole Sapporo	6	3	1	2	13	10	+3	10	Advance to knockout stage
3	Júbilo Iwata	6	2	0	4	8	9	−1	6	
4	Sagan Tosu	6	1	1	4	4	15	−11	4	

Source: JLeague.co (EN), JLeague.jp (JA)
Rules for classification: Tiebreakers

8 March	Yokohama F. Marinos	1–0	Júbilo Iwata	Yokohama
19:00	Suzuki 49' (o.g.)	JLeague.co (EN); JLeague.jp (JA)	Nakagawa (yellow card) 5'; Suzuki (yellow card) 33'	Stadium: Nissan Stadium

25 March	Júbilo Iwata	2–3	Hokkaido Consadole Sapporo	Iwata
14:00	Fujiwara 67'; Ogawa 73'	JLeague.co (EN); JLeague.jp (JA)	Nakamura (yellow card) 36'; Suga (yellow card) 39'; Tanaka 50'; Kaneko 56'; Kobayashi (yellow card) 65'; Nishino (yellow card) 69'; Arano (yellow card) 74'; Izuma 90+8'	Stadium: Yamaha Stadium; Attendance: 4,658; Referee: Shu Kawamata

5 April	Júbilo Iwata	1–2	Sagan Tosu	Iwata
19:00	Ogawa 81'	JLeague.co (EN); JLeague.jp (JA)	Akumu 6'; Kabayama 86'; Kikuchi (yellow card) 90+1'	Stadium: Yamaha Stadium; Attendance: 2,769; Referee: Hiroyuki Kimura

19 April	Júbilo Iwata	0–1	Yokohama F. Marinos	Iwata
19:00		JLeague.co (EN); JLeague.jp (JA)	Yan Matheus 7'; Inoue (yellow card) 33'; Koike (yellow card) 81'	Stadium: Yamaha Stadium; Attendance: 3,526; Referee: Koei Koya

24 May	Sagan Tosu	0–2	Júbilo Iwata	Tosu
19:00	Akumu (yellow card) 83'	JLeague.co (EN); JLeague.jp (JA)	Ogawa (yellow card) 7'; González 32'; Kaneko 76'; Fujiwara (yellow card) 84'	Stadium: Ekimae Real Estate Stadium; Attendance: 3,753; Referee: Hajime Matsuo

18 June	Hokkaido Consadole Sapporo	2–3	Júbilo Iwata	Sapporo
18:00	Lucas Fernandes 2'; Fukumori (yellow card) 51'; Fukai 73' (pen.)	JLeague.co (EN); JLeague.jp (JA)	Yamamoto 61'; Nakagawa (yellow card) 70' (goal) 81'; Furukawa 85'	Stadium: Sapporo Dome; Attendance: 10,146; Referee: Hayato Shimizu

== Goalscorers ==
Updated as of 5 July 2023.

Rank	Pos.	No.	Player	J2 League	Emperor's Cup	J.League Cup	Total
1	FW	33	(Brazil) Dudu Pacheco	5	0	0	5
1	FW	42	(Japan) Keisuke Goto	5	0	0	5
1	FW	29	(Colombia) Fabián González	2	2	1	5
4	MF	7	(Japan) Rikiya Uehara	4	0	0	4
4	MF	14	(Japan) Masaya Matsumoto	4	0	0	4
4	FW	18	(Japan) Ryo Germain	4	0	0	4
7	DF	4	(Japan) Ko Matsubara	3	0	0	3
7	MF	10	(Japan) Hiroki Yamada	3	0	0	3
7	MF	17	(Japan) Yuto Suzuki	3	0	0	3
7	MF	40	(Japan) Shota Kaneko	2	0	1	3
11	DF	5	(Japan) Daiki Ogawa	0	0	2	2
11	MF	31	(Japan) Yosuke Furukawa	1	0	1	2
11	MF	38	(Japan) Kensuke Fujiwara	1	0	1	2
14	FW	11	(Japan) Kotaro Fujikawa	1	0	0	1
14	DF	15	(Japan) Kaito Suzuki	1	0	0	1
14	DF	36	(Brazil) Ricardo Graça	1	0	0	1
14	DF	22	(Japan) So Nakagawa	0	0	1	1
14	MF	23	(Japan) Kosuke Yamamoto	0	0	1	1
Total				40	2	8	50
