= 2021 Júbilo Iwata season =

Júbilo Iwata
2021 season
- Chairman: Yoshirou Takahira
- Manager: Masakazu Suzuki
- Stadium: Yamaha Stadium
- J2 League: 1st (promoted)
- Emperor's Cup: Quarter-finals
- Top goalscorer: League: Lukian (22); All: Lukian (22)
Home colours	Away colours

The 2021 season was the 49th season in the existence of Júbilo Iwata and the club's second consecutive season in the second division of Japanese football.

== Players ==
=== First-team squad ===
As of 14 July 2021

Note: Flags indicate national team as defined under FIFA eligibility rules; some limited exceptions apply. Players may hold more than one non-FIFA nationality.

No.	Pos.	Nation	Player
1	GK	JPN	Naoki Hatta
2	MF	JPN	Yasuyuki Konno
3	DF	JPN	Kentaro Oi
4	FW	JPN	Yuki Otsu
5	DF	JPN	Daiki Ogawa
8	MF	JPN	Kotaro Omori
9	FW	JPN	Koki Ogawa
10	MF	JPN	Hiroki Yamada
11	FW	BRA	Lukian
13	MF	JPN	Kotaro Fujikawa
14	MF	JPN	Masaya Matsumoto
17	MF	JPN	Yuto Suzuki
19	FW	JPN	Naoto Miki
21	GK	JPN	Daichi Sugimoto
22	DF	JPN	So Nakagawa
23	MF	JPN	Kosuke Yamamoto

No.	Pos.	Nation	Player
25	DF	JPN	Riku Morioka
27	FW	JPN	Mahiro Yoshinaga
28	MF	JPN	Naoki Kanuma
29	FW	COL	Fabián González
30	MF	JPN	Naoya Seita
35	DF	JPN	Kaito Suzuki
36	GK	JPN	Ryuki Miura
37	GK	MDA	Alexei Koșelev
38	DF	JPN	Norimichi Yamamoto
40	FW	JPN	Shota Kaneko (On loan from Shimizu S-Pulse)
41	DF	JPN	Chiharu Kato
43	MF	JPN	Ryota Kobayashi
44	DF	JPN	Shun Obu
47	DF	JPN	Kohei Oka
50	MF	JPN	Yasuhito Endo (On loan from Gamba Osaka)

=== Out on loan ===
Note: Flags indicate national team as defined under FIFA eligibility rules; some limited exceptions apply. Players may hold more than one non-FIFA nationality.

No.	Pos.	Nation	Player
—	DF	JPN	Hiroki Ito (On loan at VfB Stuttgart II)
—	MF	JPN	Takeaki Harigaya (On loan at Giravanz Kitakyushu)
—	MF	JPN	Rikiya Uehara (On loan at Vegalta Sendai)

== Competitions ==
=== Overall record ===
Competition	First match	Last match	Starting round	Final position	Record							
Competition	First match	Last match	Starting round	Final position	Pld	W	D	L	GF	GA	GD	Win %
J2 League	28 February 2021	5 December 2021	Matchday 1	Winners	42	27	10	5	75	42	+33	64.29
Emperor's Cup	9 June 2021	27 October 2021	Second round	Quarter-finals	4	3	0	1	8	3	+5	75.00
Total					46	30	10	6	83	45	+38	65.22

Source: Soccerway

=== J2 League ===
==== League table ====
Pos	Team	Pld	W	D	L	GF	GA	GD	Pts	Promotion
1	Júbilo Iwata (C, P)	42	27	10	5	75	42	+33	91	Promotion to J1 League
2	Kyoto Sanga (P)	42	24	12	6	59	31	+28	84	Promotion to J1 League
3	Ventforet Kofu	42	23	11	8	65	38	+27	80	
4	V-Varen Nagasaki	42	23	9	10	69	44	+25	78	
5	Machida Zelvia	42	20	12	10	64	38	+26	72	

Source: Meiji Yasuda J2 League, J.League Data Site
Rules for classification: 1) Points; 2) Goal difference; 3) Goals scored; 4) Head-to-head points; 5) Head-to-head goal difference; 6) Head-to-head goal scored; 7) Fair-play points.
(C) Champions; (P) Promoted

==== Results summary ====
Overall								Home						Away					
Pld	W	D	L	GF	GA	GD	Pts	W	D	L	GF	GA	GD	W	D	L	GF	GA	GD
42	27	10	5	75	42	+33	91	14	4	3	40	25	+15	13	6	2	35	17	+18

Source: Soccerway

==== Results by round ====
Round	1	2	3	4	5	6	7	8	9	10	11	12	13	14	15	16	17	18	19	20	21	22	23	24	25	26	27	28	29	30	31	32	33	34	35	36	37	38	39	40	41	42
Ground	A	H	H	A	H	A	H	A	H	A	H	A	A	H	A	H	A	H	H	A	H	A	H	A	H	A	H	A	A	H	H	A	H	A	H	A	A	H	A	H	A	H
Result	L	L	W	W	L	W	W	W	W	L	W	D	D	W	W	W	W	W	W	W	W	D	L	D	W	W	D	W	W	D	W	W	W	D	D	W	W	W	W	D	D	W
Position	18	20	15	8	11	8	5	4	4	4	4	4	4	4	4	4	3	2	2	2	1	1	2	2	2	2	2	1	1	2	2	1	1	1	1	1	1	1	1	1	1	1

Source: Soccerway
A = Away; H = Home; W = Win; D = Draw; L = Loss

==== Matches ====
28 February 2021 1	FC Ryukyu	1–0	Júbilo Iwata	Okinawa
15:00 (UTC+9)				Stadium: Tapic Kenso Hiyagon Stadium

6 March 2021 2	Júbilo Iwata	1–3	Machida Zelvia	Iwata
14:00 (UTC+9)				Stadium: Yamaha Stadium

13 March 2021 3	Júbilo Iwata	3–2	Mito HollyHock	Iwata
14:00 (UTC+9)				Stadium: Yamaha Stadium

21 March 2021 4	Kyoto Sanga	3–4	Júbilo Iwata	Kameoka
14:00 (UTC+9)				Stadium: Sanga Stadium by Kyocera

27 March 2021 5	Júbilo Iwata	1–2	Renofa Yamaguchi	Iwata
14:00 (UTC+9)				Stadium: Yamaha Stadium

4 April 2021 6	Fagiano Okayama	0–1	Júbilo Iwata	Okayama
13:00 (UTC+9)				Stadium: City Light Stadium

10 April 2021 7	Júbilo Iwata	4–1	Matsumoto Yamaga	Iwata
14:00 (UTC+9)				Stadium: Yamaha Stadium

18 April 2021 8	SC Sagamihara	1–2	Júbilo Iwata	Sagamihara
13:00 (UTC+9)				Stadium: Gion Stadium

21 April 2021 9	Júbilo Iwata	3–2	Omiya Ardija	Iwata
19:00 (UTC+9)				Stadium: Yamaha Stadium

25 April 2021 10	Montedio Yamagata	1–0	Júbilo Iwata	Tendō
14:00 (UTC+9)				Stadium: ND Soft Stadium

1 May 2021 11	Júbilo Iwata	3–2	Tochigi SC	Iwata
19:00 (UTC+9)				Stadium: Yamaha Stadium

5 May 2021 12	Ehime FC	0–0	Júbilo Iwata	Matsuyama
14:00 (UTC+9)				Stadium: Ningineer Stadium

9 May 2021 13	Blaublitz Akita	1–1	Júbilo Iwata	Akita
13:00 (UTC+9)				Stadium: Soyu Stadium

15 May 2021 14	Júbilo Iwata	1–0	Thespakusatsu Gunma	Iwata
14:00 (UTC+9)				Stadium: Yamaha Stadium

23 May 2021 15	Tokyo Verdy	0–2	Júbilo Iwata	Chōfu
15:00 (UTC+9)				Stadium: Ajinomoto Stadium

29 May 2021 16	Júbilo Iwata	1–0	Zweigen Kanazawa	Iwata
16:00 (UTC+9)				Stadium: Yamaha Stadium

5 June 2021 17	Giravanz Kitakyushu	0–2	Júbilo Iwata	Kitakyushu
14:00 (UTC+9)				Stadium: Mikuni World Stadium Kitakyushu

13 June 2021 18	Júbilo Iwata	1–0	Ventforet Kofu	Iwata
15:00 (UTC+9)				Stadium: Yamaha Stadium

19 June 2021 19	Júbilo Iwata	1–0	JEF United Chiba	Iwata
19:00 (UTC+9)				Stadium: Yamaha Stadium

26 June 2021 20	V-Varen Nagasaki	0–1	Júbilo Iwata	Isahaya
14:00 (UTC+9)				Stadium: Transcosmos Stadium Nagasaki

3 July 2021 21	Júbilo Iwata	3–2	Albirex Niigata	Iwata
19:00 (UTC+9)				Stadium: Yamaha Stadium

11 July 2021 22	Renofa Yamaguchi	2–2	Júbilo Iwata	Yamaguchi
19:00 (UTC+9)				Stadium: Ishin Me-Life Stadium

17 July 2021 23	Júbilo Iwata	1–2	Montedio Yamagata	Iwata
19:00 (UTC+9)				Stadium: Yamaha Stadium

9 August 2021 24	Ventforet Kofu	2–2	Júbilo Iwata	Kōfu
18:00 (UTC+9)				Stadium: JIT Recycle Ink Stadium

14 August 2021 25	Júbilo Iwata	2–1	Tokyo Verdy	Iwata
19:00 (UTC+9)				Stadium: Yamaha Stadium

21 August 2021 26	Zweigen Kanazawa	1–2	Júbilo Iwata	Kanazawa
19:00 (UTC+9)				Stadium: Ishikawa Athletics Stadium

28 August 2021 27	Júbilo Iwata	1–1	SC Sagamihara	Iwata
19:00 (UTC+9)				Stadium: Yamaha Stadium

4 September 2021 28	Matsumoto Yamaga	0–4	Júbilo Iwata	Matsumoto
19:00 (UTC+9)				Stadium: Sunpro Alwin

11 September 2021 29	JEF United Chiba	1–3	Júbilo Iwata	Chiba
18:00 (UTC+9)				Stadium: Fukuda Denshi Arena

18 September 2021 30	Júbilo Iwata	1–1	Fagiano Okayama	Iwata
19:00 (UTC+9)				Stadium: Yamaha Stadium

25 September 2021 31	Júbilo Iwata	2–0	FC Ryukyu	Iwata
19:00 (UTC+9)				Stadium: Yamaha Stadium

3 October 2021 32	Machida Zelvia	1–2	Júbilo Iwata	Machida
15:00 (UTC+9)				Stadium: Machida GION Stadium

9 October 2021 33	Júbilo Iwata	4–1	Giravanz Kitakyushu	Iwata
15:00 (UTC+9)				Stadium: Yamaha Stadium

17 October 2021 34	Tochigi SC	1–1	Júbilo Iwata	Utsunomiya
14:00 (UTC+9)				Stadium: Kanseki Stadium Tochigi

23 October 2021 35	Júbilo Iwata	2–2	Ehime FC	Iwata
15:00 (UTC+9)				Stadium: Yamaha Stadium

30 October 2021 36	Omiya Ardija	1–2	Júbilo Iwata	Saitama
14:00 (UTC+9)				Stadium: NACK5 Stadium Omiya

3 November 2021 37	Albirex Niigata	0–1	Júbilo Iwata	Niigata
14:00 (UTC+9)				Stadium: Denka Big Swan Stadium

7 November 2021 38	Júbilo Iwata	1–0	Kyoto Sanga	Iwata
14:00 (UTC+9)				Stadium: Yamaha Stadium

14 November 2021 39	Mito HollyHock	1–3	Júbilo Iwata	Mito
14:00 (UTC+9)				Stadium: K's denki Stadium Mito

20 November 2021 40	Júbilo Iwata	2–2	V-Varen Nagasaki	Iwata
14:00 (UTC+9)				Stadium: Yamaha Stadium

28 November 2021 41	Thespakusatsu Gunma	0–0	Júbilo Iwata	Maebashi
14:00 (UTC+9)				Stadium: Shoda Shoyu Stadium Gunma

5 December 2021 42	Júbilo Iwata	2–1	Blaublitz Akita	Iwata
13:00 (UTC+9)				Stadium: Yamaha Stadium

=== Emperor's Cup ===
9 June 2021 Second round	Júbilo Iwata	3–0	Hokkaido Tokachi Sky Earth	Iwata
19:00 JST	Ogawa 56', 86'; Miki 71'	Report		Stadium: Yamaha Stadium; Attendance: 1,905; Referee: Akihiko Ikeuchi

7 July 2021 Third round	Honda FC	1–4	Júbilo Iwata	Iwata
18:30 JST	Suzuki 57'	Report	González 2'; Ogawa 27', 35'; Miki 85'	Stadium: Yamaha Stadium; Attendance: 4,794; Referee: Masaaki Iemoto

18 August 2021 Fourth round	Verspah Oita	0–1 (a.e.t.)	Júbilo Iwata	Ōita
19:00 JST		Report	González 101'	Stadium: Showa Denko Dome Oita; Attendance: 512; Referee: Yoshiaki Imai

27 October 2021 Quarter-finals	Júbilo Iwata	0–2	Oita Trinita	Fukuroi
19:00 JST		Report	Nagasawa 65'; Fujimoto 90+1'	Stadium: Shizuoka Stadium; Attendance: 3,418; Referee: Jumpei Iida
