= 2024 Júbilo Iwata season =

Júbilo Iwata
2024 season
- Manager: Akinobu Yokouchi
- Stadium: Yamaha Stadium
- J1 League: 12th
- Emperor's Cup: Second round
- J.League Cup: First round – Game 2
- Top goalscorer: League: Ryo Germain (10); All: Ryo Germain (10)
- Average home league attendance: 13,817

The 2024 Júbilo Iwata season was the club's 52nd season in existence and the first back in the Japanese top flight after one year in the J2 League. As well as the domestic league, they competed in the Emperor's Cup and the J.League Cup.

== Squad ==
=== Season squad ===
Note: Flags indicate national team as defined under FIFA eligibility rules; some limited exceptions apply. Players may hold more than one non-FIFA nationality.

No.	Pos.	Nation	Player
1	GK	JPN	Eiji Kawashima
2	DF	JPN	Ikki Kawasaki
3	DF	JPN	Riku Morioka
4	DF	JPN	Ko Matsubara (vice-captain)
5	DF	JPN	Daiki Ogawa
6	DF	JPN	Makito Ito
7	MF	JPN	Rikiya Uehara (vice-captain)
10	MF	JPN	Hiroki Yamada (captain)
11	FW	JPN	Ryo Germain
13	MF	JPN	Kotaro Fujikawa
14	MF	JPN	Masaya Matsumoto
15	DF	JPN	Kaito Suzuki
16	MF	BRA	Léo Gomes
17	FW	BRA	Weverton
18	DF	JPN	Keita Takahata
19	MF	BRA	Bruno José
20	GK	JPN	Yuya Tsuboi (on loan from Vissel Kobe)

No.	Pos.	Nation	Player
21	GK	JPN	Ryuki Miura
24	GK	JPN	Mitsuki Sugimoto
25	MF	JPN	Shun Nakamura
26	DF	JPN	Shunsuke Nishikubo
28	MF	JPN	Naoki Kanuma
31	MF	JPN	Yosuke Furukawa
35	DF	KOR	Park Se-gi
36	DF	BRA	Ricardo Graça
37	MF	JPN	Rei Hirakawa
40	MF	JPN	Shota Kaneko
41	MF	JPN	Masatoshi Ishida
46	FW	JPN	Shota Yamamoto ^{Type 2}
47	GK	JPN	Keizen Iida ^{Type 2}
48	MF	JPN	Tokumo Kawai ^{Type 2}
50	MF	JPN	Hiroto Uemura
77	MF	JPN	Kensuke Fujiwara
99	FW	BRA	Matheus Peixoto

== Transfers ==
=== Arrivals ===
Date	Position	Player	From	Type	Source
7 July 2022	MF	(Japan) Hiroto Uemura	(Japan) Waseda University	Full	
14 April 2023	GK	(Japan) Mitsuki Sugimoto	(Japan) Rissho University	Full	
28 April 2023	GK	(Japan) Kotaro Nakajima	(Japan) Tokoha University	Full	
21 December 2023	MF	(Japan) Keita Takahata	(Japan) Oita Trinita	Full	
26 December 2023	MF	(Japan) Ikki Kawasaki	(Japan) Kamatamare Sanuki	Full	
26 December 2023	DF	(South Korea) Park Se-gi	(Japan) Toho High School	Full	
30 December 2023	MF	(Japan) Rei Hirakawa	(Japan) Roasso Kumamoto	Full	
31 December 2023	FW	(Brazil) Weverton	(United States) New England Revolution II	Full	
31 December 2023	MF	(Brazil) Bruno José	(Brazil) Guarani	Full	
31 December 2023	MF	(Brazil) Léo Gomes	(Brazil) Vitória	Full	
31 December 2023	FW	(Brazil) Matheus Peixoto	(Brazil) Atlético Goianiense	Full	
5 January 2024	GK	(Japan) Yuya Tsuboi	(Japan) Vissel Kobe	Loan	
5 January 2024	MF	(Japan) Shun Nakamura	(Japan) Avispa Fukuoka	Full	
5 January 2024	MF	(Japan) Masatoshi Ishida	(South Korea) Daejeon Hana Citizen	Full	
6 January 2024	DF	(Japan) Shunsuke Nishikubo	(Japan) JEF United Chiba	Full	
12 January 2024	GK	(Japan) Eiji Kawashima		Free agent	

=== Departures ===
Date	Position	Player	To	Type	Source
2 November 2023	GK	(Japan) Naoki Hatta		Retired	
28 November 2023	FW	(Japan) Keisuke Goto	(Belgium) RSC Anderlecht	Loan	
8 December 2023	MF	(Japan) So Nakagawa	(Japan) Fujieda MYFC	Full	
23 December 2023	MF	(Japan) Yuto Suzuki	(Japan) Shonan Bellmare	Full	
25 December 2023	FW	(Japan) Yuki Otsu		Retired	
26 December 2023	FW	(Japan) Mahiro Yoshinaga	(Japan) Kamatamare Sanuki	Loan	
26 December 2023	FW	(Japan) Naoto Miki	(Japan) Gainare Tottori	Full	
28 December 2023	FW	(Colombia) Fabián González	(Japan) Ventforet Kofu	Full	
28 December 2023	GK	(Japan) Yuji Kajikawa	(Japan) Kashima Antlers	Full	
28 December 2023	MF	(Japan) Kosuke Yamamoto	(Japan) Matsumoto Yamaga	Full	
29 December 2023	GK	(Japan) Kotaro Nakajima	(Japan) Tochigi SC	Loan	
31 December 2023	DF	(Japan) Norimichi Yamamoto	(Japan) Zweigen Kanazawa	Full	
6 January 2024	MF	(Japan) Takeaki Harigaya	(Japan) Fukushima United	Full	
6 January 2024	MF	(Brazil) Dudu	(Japan) JEF United Chiba	Full	
7 January 2024	MF	(Japan) Naoya Seita	(Japan) Ococias Kyoto AC	Full	
9 January 2024	FW	(Japan) Kenyu Sugimoto	(Japan) Omiya Ardija	Loan	
9 January 2024	MF	(Japan) Yasuhito Endo		Retired	
12 January 2024	DF	(Japan) Ryo Takano	(Japan) SC Sagamihara	Full	
26 January 2024	DF	(Japan) Kotaro Omori	(Thailand) Muangthong United	Loan	

== Friendly matches ==
31 January 2024 Friendly	Júbilo Iwata	5–0	Tokai University Kumamoto	Kagoshima
		Report		Stadium: Shiranami Stadium
Note: Two halves of 45 minutes

4 February 2024 Friendly	Kagoshima United FC	0–4	Júbilo Iwata	Kagoshima
13:03 UTC+9		Report	Kanuma 4', 37'; Kaneko 50'; Uehara 65'	Stadium: Shiranami Stadium; Attendance: 3,379

7 February 2024 Friendly	Júbilo Iwata	3–1	(South Korea) Daejeon Hana Citizen	Kagoshima
11:00 UTC+9		Report		Stadium: Shiranami Stadium
Note: Four periods of 45 minutes

10 February 2024 Friendly	Júbilo Iwata	4–3	Shimizu S-Pulse	Kagoshima
11:30 UTC+9		Report		Stadium: Shiranami Stadium
Note: Four periods of 45 minutes

25 February 2024 Friendly	Júbilo Iwata	3–2	Fujieda MYFC

26 May 2024 Friendly	Júbilo Iwata	3–3	FC Gifu	Iwata
13:00				Stadium: Yamaha Stadium

24 July 2024 Friendly	Júbilo Iwata	１-１	(France) Reims	静岡県磐田市
19:30				Stadium: ヤマハスタジアム; Attendance: 10,018; Referee: 福島 孝一郎

== Competitions ==
=== Overall record ===
Competition	First match	Last match	Starting round	Record							
Competition	First match	Last match	Starting round	Pld	W	D	L	GF	GA	GD	Win %
J1 League	24 February 2024		Matchday 1	17	5	3	9	22	26	−4	29.41
Emperor's Cup	12 June 2024		Second round	0	0	0	0	0	0	+0	—
J.League Cup	17 April 2024		2nd round	1	0	0	1	0	1	−1	0.00
Total				18	5	3	10	22	27	−5	27.78

Last updated: 1 June 2024
Source: Competitions

=== J1 League ===
==== Table ====
Pos	Team	Pld	W	D	L	GF	GA	GD	Pts	Qualification or relegation
16	Albirex Niigata	38	10	12	16	44	59	−15	42	
17	Kashiwa Reysol	38	9	14	15	39	51	−12	41	
18	Júbilo Iwata (R)	38	10	8	20	47	68	−21	38	Relegation to the J2 League
19	Hokkaido Consadole Sapporo (R)	38	9	10	19	43	66	−23	37	Relegation to the J2 League
20	Sagan Tosu (R)	38	10	5	23	48	68	−20	35	Relegation to the J2 League

Source: J1 League, J.League Data Site
Rules for classification: 1) Points; 2) Goal difference; 3) Goals scored; 4) Head-to-head points; 5) Head-to-head goal difference; 6) Head-to-head goals scored; 7) Fewer disciplinary points.
(R) Relegated

==== Results summary ====
Overall								Home						Away					
Pld	W	D	L	GF	GA	GD	Pts	W	D	L	GF	GA	GD	W	D	L	GF	GA	GD
10	4	1	5	15	13	+2	13	2	0	3	4	4	0	2	1	2	11	9	+2

Last updated: 28 April 2024.
Source: Worldfootball

==== Results by round ====
Round	1	2	3	4	5	6	7	8	9	10
Ground	H	A	H	A	A	H	A	H	A	H
Result	L	W	L	L	L	W	W	L	D	W
Position	18	13	16	16	18	17	11	13	14	12

Updated to match(es) played on 28 April 2024. Source: Worldfootball
A = Away; H = Home; W = Win; D = Draw; L = Loss

==== Matches ====
The full league fixtures were released on 23 January 2024.

24 February 1	Júbilo Iwata	0–2	Vissel Kobe	Iwata
13:03 UTC+9	Ito (yellow card) 90+2'	Report	Yuruki 5'; Sasaki 49'	Stadium: Yamaha Stadium; Attendance: 14,778; Referee: Shu Kawamata

1 March 2	Kawasaki Frontale	4–5	Júbilo Iwata	Kawasaki
19:04 UTC+9	Tachibanada (yellow card) 36'; Erison 36', 55'; Marcinho 59'; Jung Sung-Ryong (yellow card) 79'; Yamada 85' (pen.); Segawa (yellow card) 90+6'	Report	Uemura 6'; Germain 18', 29', 80' (pen.), 90+7' (pen.); Graça (yellow card) 48'; Fujikawa (yellow card) 90+12'	Stadium: Uvance Todoroki Stadium by Fujitsu; Attendance: 20,316; Referee: Jumpei Iida

9 March 3	Júbilo Iwata	0–1	Kashiwa Reysol	Iwata
14:03 UTC+9	Yamada (yellow card) 43'	Report	Koga 35'; Hosoya (yellow card) 79'	Stadium: Yamaha Stadium; Attendance: 12,720; Referee: Koji Takasaki

16 March 4	Gamba Osaka	2–1	Júbilo Iwata	Suita
15:03 UTC+9	Usami 4'; Yamada (yellow card) 37'; Welton Felipe (yellow card) 52'; Dawhan 57'	Report	Germain 60'; Fujikawa (yellow card) 72'	Stadium: Suita City Football Stadium; Attendance: 24,341; Referee: Koichiro Fukushima

30 March 5	Kashima Antlers	1–0	Júbilo Iwata	Kashima
15:03 JST	Suzuki 33' (pen.)	Report		Stadium: Kashima Soccer Stadium; Attendance: 21,069; Referee: Koei Koya

3 April 6	Júbilo Iwata	2–0	Albirex Niigata	Iwata
19:03 UTC+9	Germain 75', 79'	Report		Stadium: Yamaha Stadium; Attendance: 8,355; Referee: Yoshiro Imamura

7 April 7	Kyoto Sanga	0–3	Júbilo Iwata	Kameoka
14:03 JST		Report		Stadium: Sanga Stadium by Kyocera; Attendance: 10,972; Referee: Keigo Sendachi

13 April 8	Júbilo Iwata	0–1	Nagoya Grampus	Iwata
14:03 JST		Report	Masui 8' (red card) 43'	Stadium: Yamaha Stadium; Attendance: 13,135; Referee: Masuya Ueda

20 April 9	Avispa Fukuoka	2–2	Júbilo Iwata	Fukuoka
15:03 JST	Zahedi 60', 78'	Report	Germain 30', 47'	Stadium: Best Denki Stadium; Attendance: 6,254; Referee: Yusuke Araki

27 April 10	Júbilo Iwata	2–0	Machida Zelvia	Iwata
14:03 UTC+9	Matsubara 46'; Germain 70'	Report		Stadium: Yamaha Stadium; Attendance: 12,982; Referee: Hayato Shimizu

=== J.League Cup ===
17 April 2024 Round 2	V-Varen Nagasaki	1–0	Júbilo Iwata	Nagasaki
19:03 UTC+9	Kushibiki 53'; Wakahara (yellow card) 86'	Report		Stadium: Transcosmos Stadium Nagasaki; Attendance: 2,560; Referee: Tetsuro Yoshida
