= 2020 Júbilo Iwata season =

Júbilo Iwata
2020 season
- Chairman: Yoshirou Takahira
- Manager: Fernando Jubero (until 1 October); Masakazu Suzuki (from 2 October)
- Stadium: Yamaha Stadium
- J2 League: 6th
- Top goalscorer: League: Lukian (10); All: Lukian (10)
- Biggest win: Júbilo Iwata 6–0 Zweigen Kanazawa
Home colours	Away colours

The 2020 season was the 48th season in the history of Júbilo Iwata and the club's first season back in the second division of Japanese football since 2015.

== Players ==
=== First-team squad ===
As of 28 June 2020

Note: Flags indicate national team as defined under FIFA eligibility rules; some limited exceptions apply. Players may hold more than one non-FIFA nationality.

No.	Pos.	Nation	Player
1	GK	JPN	Naoki Hatta
2	MF	JPN	Yasuyuki Konno
3	DF	JPN	Kentaro Oi
5	DF	JPN	Nagisa Sakurauchi
6	DF	ARG	Juan Forlín
7	MF	JPN	Rikiya Uehara
8	MF	JPN	Kotaro Omori
9	FW	JPN	Koki Ogawa
10	MF	JPN	Hiroki Yamada
11	FW	BRA	Lukian
13	MF	JPN	Tomohiko Miyazaki
14	MF	JPN	Masaya Matsumoto
15	MF	JPN	Hiroki Ito
16	FW	JPN	Seiya Nakano
18	MF	UZB	Fozil Musaev
19	FW	JPN	Naoto Miki
20	FW	BRA	Lulinha

No.	Pos.	Nation	Player
21	GK	JPN	Daichi Sugimoto
22	DF	JPN	So Nakagawa
23	MF	JPN	Kosuke Yamamoto
24	DF	JPN	Daiki Ogawa
25	DF	JPN	Riku Morioka
26	MF	JPN	Kotaro Fujikawa
27	FW	JPN	Mahiro Yoshinaga
28	DF	JPN	Ryoma Ishida
29	DF	JPN	Kakeru Funaki
30	MF	JPN	Naoya Seita
31	GK	JPN	Ko Shimura
33	DF	JPN	Yoshiaki Fujita
34	MF	JPN	Takeaki Harigaya
36	GK	JPN	Ryuki Miura
44	DF	JPN	Shun Obu
45	DF	JPN	Kaito Suzuki

=== Out on loan ===
Note: Flags indicate national team as defined under FIFA eligibility rules; some limited exceptions apply. Players may hold more than one non-FIFA nationality.

No.	Pos.	Nation	Player
16	FW	JPN	Seiya Nakano (at Fagiano Okayama)
—	MF	JPN	Hiroki Ito (at Nagoya Grampus)

== Competitions ==
=== Overall record ===
Competition	First match	Last match	Starting round	Final position	Record							
Competition	First match	Last match	Starting round	Final position	Pld	W	D	L	GF	GA	GD	Win %
J2 League	23 February 2020	20 December 2020	Matchday 1	6th	42	16	15	11	58	47	+11	38.10
Total					42	16	15	11	58	47	+11	38.10

Source: Soccerway

=== J2 League ===
==== League table ====
Pos	Team	Pld	W	D	L	GF	GA	GD	Pts
4	Ventforet Kofu	42	16	17	9	50	41	+9	65
5	Giravanz Kitakyushu	42	19	8	15	59	51	+8	65
6	Júbilo Iwata	42	16	15	11	58	47	+11	63
7	Montedio Yamagata	42	17	11	14	59	42	+17	62
8	Kyoto Sanga	42	16	11	15	47	45	+2	59

Source: Meiji Yasuda J2 League
Rules for classification: 1) Points; 2) Goal difference; 3) Head-to-head points; 4) Head-to-head goal difference; 5) Head-to-head goal scored; 6) Number of wins; 7) Goals scored; 8) Fair-play points

==== Results summary ====
Overall								Home						Away					
Pld	W	D	L	GF	GA	GD	Pts	W	D	L	GF	GA	GD	W	D	L	GF	GA	GD
0	0	0	0	0	0	0	0	0	0	0	0	0	0	0	0	0	0	0	0

Source: Soccerway

==== Results by round ====
Round	1	2	3	4	5	6	7	8	9	10	11	12	13	14	15	16	17	18	19	20	21	22	23	24	25	26	27	28	29	30	31	32	33	34	35	36	37	38	39	40	41	42
Ground	H	A	H	H	A	H	H	A	A	H	A	H	A	H	A	H	A	H	A	H	H	A	A	H	A	H	A	A	H	H	A	H	H	A	A	H	A	A	H	A	H	A
Result	W	L	D	W	L	W	L	D	W	W	D	L	D	W	D	D	W	D	D	L	D	L	L	L	D	W	W	D	W	W	L	D	D	D	D	W	W	L	W	L	W	W
Position																																										

Source: Soccerway
A = Away; H = Home; W = Win; D = Draw; L = Loss

==== Matches ====
23 February 2020 1	Júbilo Iwata	2–0	Montedio Yamagata	Iwata
				Stadium: Yamaha Stadium

28 June 2020 2	Kyoto Sanga	2–0	Júbilo Iwata	Kameoka
				Stadium: Sanga Stadium by Kyocera

5 July 2020 3	Júbilo Iwata	1–1	Fagiano Okayama	Iwata
				Stadium: Yamaha Stadium

11 July 2020 4	Júbilo Iwata	2–1	Renofa Yamaguchi	Iwata
				Stadium: Yamaha Stadium

15 July 2020 5	Avispa Fukuoka	1–0	Júbilo Iwata	Fukuoka
				Stadium: Level5 Stadium

19 July 2020 6	Júbilo Iwata	2–0	Giravanz Kitakyushu	Iwata
				Stadium: Yamaha Stadium

25 July 2020 7	Júbilo Iwata	0–2	Tokushima Vortis	Iwata
				Stadium: Yamaha Stadium

8 August 2020 10	Júbilo Iwata	2–1	Matsumoto Yamaga	Iwata
				Stadium: Yamaha Stadium

16 August 2020 12	Júbilo Iwata	1–2	JEF United Chiba	Iwata
				Stadium: Yamaha Stadium

23 August 2020 14	Júbilo Iwata	6–0	Zweigen Kanazawa	Iwata
				Stadium: Yamaha Stadium

2 September 2020 16	Júbilo Iwata	2–2	Tokyo Verdy	Iwata
				Stadium: Yamaha Stadium

9 September 2020 18	Júbilo Iwata	0–0	Mito HollyHock	Iwata
				Stadium: Yamaha Stadium

19 September 2020 20	Júbilo Iwata	2–3	Tochigi SC	Iwata
				Stadium: Yamaha Stadium

23 September 2020 21	Júbilo Iwata	1–1	Ventforet Kofu	Iwata
				Stadium: Yamaha Stadium

4 October 2020 24	Júbilo Iwata	1–2	Kyoto Sanga	Iwata
				Stadium: Yamaha Stadium

14 October 2020 26	Júbilo Iwata	1–0	V-Varen Nagasaki	Iwata
				Stadium: Yamaha Stadium

25 October 2020 29	Júbilo Iwata	3–1	Thespakusatsu Gunma	Iwata
				Stadium: Yamaha Stadium

1 November 2020 30	Júbilo Iwata	2–1	Avispa Fukuoka	Iwata
				Stadium: Yamaha Stadium

4 November 2020 31	Tokushima Vortis	3–1	Júbilo Iwata	Naruto
				Stadium: Pocarisweat Stadium

8 November 2020 32	Júbilo Iwata	1–1	Ehime FC	Iwata
				Stadium: Yamaha Stadium

11 November 2020 33	Júbilo Iwata	1–1	Albirex Niigata	Iwata
				Stadium: Yamaha Stadium

15 November 2020 34	Fagiano Okayama	1–1	Júbilo Iwata	Okayama
				Stadium: City Light Stadium

21 November 2020 35	Ventforet Kofu	1–1	Júbilo Iwata	Kōfu
				Stadium: Yamanashi Chuo Bank Stadium

25 November 2020 36	Júbilo Iwata	3–0	FC Ryukyu	Iwata
				Stadium: Yamaha Stadium

29 November 2020 37	JEF United Chiba	1–2	Júbilo Iwata	Chiba
				Stadium: Fukuda Denshi Arena

2 December 2020 38	Mito HollyHock	2–1	Júbilo Iwata	Mito
				Stadium: K's denki Stadium Mito

6 December 2020 39	Júbilo Iwata	2–0	Omiya Ardija	Iwata
				Stadium: Yamaha Stadium

13 December 2020 40	Giravanz Kitakyushu	2–0	Júbilo Iwata	Kitakyushu
				Stadium: Mikuni World Stadium Kitakyushu

16 December 2020 41	Júbilo Iwata	3–2	Machida Zelvia	Iwata
				Stadium: Yamaha Stadium

20 December 2020 42	Tochigi SC	1–2	Júbilo Iwata	Utsunomiya
				Stadium: Tochigi Green Stadium
