= 2017 Júbilo Iwata season =

Júbilo Iwata
2017 season
- Manager: Hiroshi Nanami
- Stadium: Yamaha Stadium
- J1 League: 6th

The 2017 season saw Júbilo Iwata compete in the J1 League, the top tier of Japanese football.

== J1 League ==
=== League table ===
Pos	Team	Pld	W	D	L	GF	GA	GD	Pts	Qualification or relegation
4	Kashiwa Reysol	34	18	8	8	49	33	+16	62	Champions League play-off round (Note: The winner of the 2017 Emperor's Cup qualified for the group stage of the 2018 AFC Champions League. Since the Emperor's Cup winner Cerezo Osaka had already qualified for the AFC Champions League, the play-off round spot was awarded to the fourth-placed team.)
5	Yokohama F. Marinos	34	17	8	9	45	36	+9	59	
6	Júbilo Iwata	34	16	10	8	50	30	+20	58	
7	Urawa Red Diamonds	34	14	7	13	64	54	+10	49	
8	Sagan Tosu	34	13	8	13	41	44	−3	47	

Source: Meiji Yasuda J1 League
Rules for classification: 1) Points; 2) Goal difference; 3) Goals scored

=== Match details ===
J1 League match details
Match	Date	Team	Score	Team	Venue	Attendance
1	25 February 2017	Cerezo Osaka	0–0	Júbilo Iwata	Yanmar Stadium Nagai	33,208
2	4 March 2017	Júbilo Iwata	0–1	Vegalta Sendai	Yamaha Stadium	14,554
3	11 March 2017	Omiya Ardija	1–2	Júbilo Iwata	NACK5 Stadium Omiya	11,943
4	18 March 2017	Vissel Kobe	1–0	Júbilo Iwata	Noevir Stadium Kobe	17,027
5	1 April 2017	Júbilo Iwata	3–1	Shimizu S-Pulse	Shizuoka Stadium	40,491
6	8 April 2017	Yokohama F. Marinos	2–1	Júbilo Iwata	Nissan Stadium	38,803
7	16 April 2017	Júbilo Iwata	2–1	Sagan Tosu	Yamaha Stadium	11,910
8	22 April 2017	Kashima Antlers	0–3	Júbilo Iwata	Kashima Soccer Stadium	18,276
9	30 April 2017	Júbilo Iwata	2–2	Hokkaido Consadole Sapporo	Yamaha Stadium	14,495
10	7 May 2017	Ventforet Kofu	0–0	Júbilo Iwata	Yamanashi Chuo Bank Stadium	12,622
11	14 May 2017	Júbilo Iwata	0–2	Kawasaki Frontale	Yamaha Stadium	13,782
12	20 May 2017	Júbilo Iwata	0–2	Kashiwa Reysol	Yamaha Stadium	13,470
13	27 May 2017	Sanfrecce Hiroshima	0–0	Júbilo Iwata	Edion Stadium Hiroshima	13,008
14	4 June 2017	Júbilo Iwata	3–0	Gamba Osaka	Yamaha Stadium	13,953
15	18 June 2017	Urawa Reds	2–4	Júbilo Iwata	Saitama Stadium 2002	34,766
16	25 June 2017	Júbilo Iwata	2–0	FC Tokyo	Yamaha Stadium	13,816
17	1 July 2017	Albirex Niigata	0–2	Júbilo Iwata	Denka Big Swan Stadium	22,379
18	8 July 2017	Júbilo Iwata	1–0	Ventforet Kofu	Yamaha Stadium	14,159
19	29 July 2017	Kawasaki Frontale	2–5	Júbilo Iwata	Kawasaki Todoroki Stadium	23,858
20	5 August 2017	Júbilo Iwata	2–3	Sanfrecce Hiroshima	Yamaha Stadium	14,515
21	9 August 2017	Vegalta Sendai	0–0	Júbilo Iwata	Yurtec Stadium Sendai	11,500
22	13 August 2017	Gamba Osaka	0–2	Júbilo Iwata	Suita City Football Stadium	35,315
23	19 August 2017	Júbilo Iwata	1–1	Cerezo Osaka	Yamaha Stadium	14,881
24	26 August 2017	Júbilo Iwata	2–1	Vissel Kobe	Yamaha Stadium	14,539
25	9 September 2017	Hokkaido Consadole Sapporo	2–1	Júbilo Iwata	Sapporo Dome	19,063
26	17 September 2017	Júbilo Iwata	1–1	Urawa Reds	Shizuoka Stadium	23,783
27	23 September 2017	Júbilo Iwata	2–1	Omiya Ardija	Yamaha Stadium	13,119
28	30 September 2017	FC Tokyo	0–0	Júbilo Iwata	Ajinomoto Stadium	26,736
29	14 October 2017	Shimizu S-Pulse	0–3	Júbilo Iwata	IAI Stadium Nihondaira	18,556
30	21 October 2017	Júbilo Iwata	2–2	Albirex Niigata	Yamaha Stadium	11,762
31	29 October 2017	Júbilo Iwata	2–1	Yokohama F. Marinos	Shizuoka Stadium	19,525
32	18 November 2017	Kashiwa Reysol	1–0	Júbilo Iwata	Hitachi Kashiwa Stadium	11,545
33	26 November 2017	Sagan Tosu	0–2	Júbilo Iwata	Best Amenity Stadium	16,564
34	2 December 2017	Júbilo Iwata	0–0	Kashima Antlers	Yamaha Stadium	14,696

== Appearances and goals ==
No.	Pos	Nat	Player	Total		J1 League	
No.	Pos	Nat	Player	Apps	Goals	Apps	Goals
1	GK	(Japan) JPN	Naoki Hatta	2	0	2	0
2	DF	(Japan) JPN	Taisuke Nakamura	2	0	2	0
3	DF	(Japan) JPN	Kentaro Oi	32	5	32	5
5	DF	(Japan) JPN	Nagisa Sakurauchi	31	2	31	2
7	MF	(Japan) JPN	Kota Ueda	13	1	13	1
8	MF	(Uzbekistan) UZB	Fozil Musaev	31	4	31	4
9	MF	(Japan) JPN	Yoshiaki Ota	8	0	8	0
10	MF	(Japan) JPN	Shunsuke Nakamura	30	5	30	5
11	MF	(Japan) JPN	Takuya Matsuura	26	3	26	3
13	DF	(Japan) JPN	Tomohiko Miyazaki	29	0	29	0
14	MF	(Japan) JPN	Masaya Matsumoto	18	0	18	0
15	FW	(Brazil) BRA	Adaílton	32	8	32	8
16	FW	(Japan) JPN	Kazuki Saito	7	0	7	0
17	MF	(Japan) JPN	Takafumi Shimizu	0	0	0	0
18	FW	(Japan) JPN	Koki Ogawa	5	0	5	0
19	MF	(Japan) JPN	Hiroki Yamada	5	1	5	1
20	FW	(Japan) JPN	Kengo Kawamata	34	14	34	14
21	GK	(Poland) POL	Krzysztof Kamiński	33	0	33	0
22	MF	(Japan) JPN	Daisuke Matsui	7	0	7	0
23	MF	(Japan) JPN	Kosuke Yamamoto	5	0	5	0
24	DF	(Japan) JPN	Daiki Ogawa	20	0	20	0
25	DF	(Japan) JPN	Takuma Ominami	0	0	0	0
26	MF	(Japan) JPN	Kotaro Fujikawa	0	0	0	0
27	MF	(Japan) JPN	Daigo Araki	5	0	5	0
30	MF	(Japan) JPN	Rikiya Uehara	6	0	6	0
31	GK	(Japan) JPN	Ko Shimura	0	0	0	0
33	DF	(Japan) JPN	Yoshiaki Fujita	5	0	5	0
34	MF	(Japan) JPN	Takeaki Harigaya	0	0	0	0
35	DF	(Japan) JPN	Shun Morishita	29	1	29	1
36	GK	(Japan) JPN	Ryuki Miura	0	0	0	0
37	FW	(Japan) JPN	Seiya Nakano	0	0	0	0
38	MF	(Japan) JPN	Hiroki Ito	0	0	0	0
40	MF	(Japan) JPN	Hayao Kawabe	32	4	32	4
41	DF	(Japan) JPN	Shohei Takahashi	28	0	28	0
