= 2018 Júbilo Iwata season =

Júbilo Iwata
2018 season
- Manager: Hiroshi Nanami
- Stadium: Yamaha Stadium
- J1 League: 16th
Home colours	Away colours

2018 Júbilo Iwata season.

== Squad ==
As of 16 January 2018.

Note: Flags indicate national team as defined under FIFA eligibility rules; some limited exceptions apply. Players may hold more than one non-FIFA nationality.

No.	Pos.	Nation	Player
1	GK	JPN	Naoki Hatta
3	DF	JPN	Kentaro Ohi
4	DF	JPN	Ryo Shinzato
5	DF	JPN	Nagisa Sakurauchi
6	MF	BRA	Guilherme Santos
7	MF	JPN	Taishi Taguchi
8	MF	UZB	Fozil Musaev
9	MF	JPN	Yoshiaki Ota
10	MF	JPN	Shunsuke Nakamura
11	MF	JPN	Takuya Matsuura
13	MF	JPN	Tomohiko Miyazaki
14	MF	JPN	Masaya Matsumoto
15	MF	BRA	Adaílton
16	FW	JPN	Seiya Nakano
18	FW	JPN	Koki Ogawa
19	MF	JPN	Hiroki Yamada

No.	Pos.	Nation	Player
20	FW	JPN	Kengo Kawamata
21	GK	POL	Krzysztof Kamiński
23	MF	JPN	Kosuke Yamamoto
24	DF	JPN	Daiki Ogawa
25	DF	JPN	Takuma Ominami
26	MF	JPN	Kotaro Fujikawa
27	MF	JPN	Daigo Araki
30	MF	JPN	Rikiya Uehara
31	GK	JPN	Ko Shimura
33	DF	JPN	Yoshiaki Fujita
34	MF	JPN	Takeaki Harigaya
35	DF	JPN	Shun Morishita
36	GK	JPN	Ryuki Miura
37	FW	BRA	Gabriel Morbeck
38	MF	JPN	Hiroki Ito
41	DF	JPN	Shohei Takahashi

=== Out on loan ===
Note: Flags indicate national team as defined under FIFA eligibility rules; some limited exceptions apply. Players may hold more than one non-FIFA nationality.

No.	Pos.	Nation	Player
—	GK	JPN	Ayumi Niekawa (at Azul Claro Numazu)
—	DF	JPN	Ryoma Ishida (at Zweigen Kanazawa)

== J1 League ==
Match	Date	Team	Score	Team	Venue	Attendance
1	2018.02.25	Júbilo Iwata	0-3	Kawasaki Frontale	Shizuoka Stadium	31,375
2	2018.03.03	Nagoya Grampus	1-0	Júbilo Iwata	Toyota Stadium	38,916
3	2018.03.10	Júbilo Iwata	2-0	FC Tokyo	Yamaha Stadium	13,928
4	2018.03.18	Sanfrecce Hiroshima	0-0	Júbilo Iwata	Edion Stadium Hiroshima	16,962
5	2018.04.01	Júbilo Iwata	2-1	Urawa Reds	Shizuoka Stadium	21,755
6	2018.04.07	Júbilo Iwata	0-0	Shimizu S-Pulse	Shizuoka Stadium	30,598
7	2018.04.11	Gamba Osaka	2-0	Júbilo Iwata	Panasonic Stadium Suita	12,615
8	2018.04.15	Júbilo Iwata	1-0	Sagan Tosu	Yamaha Stadium	11,126
9	2018.04.21	Vegalta Sendai	0-3	Júbilo Iwata	Yurtec Stadium Sendai	13,316
10	2018.04.25	Júbilo Iwata	1-2	V-Varen Nagasaki	Yamaha Stadium	8,047
11	2018.04.28	Júbilo Iwata	1-1	Cerezo Osaka	Yamaha Stadium	13,884
12	2018.05.02	Yokohama F. Marinos	1-3	Júbilo Iwata	Nissan Stadium	19,738
13	2018.05.05	Kashiwa Reysol	1-2	Júbilo Iwata	Sankyo Frontier Kashiwa Stadium	14,208
14	2018.05.12	Júbilo Iwata	0-2	Vissel Kobe	Yamaha Stadium	14,912
15	2018.05.19	Shonan Bellmare	1-0	Júbilo Iwata	Shonan BMW Stadium Hiratsuka	14,385
16	2018.07.18	Júbilo Iwata	3-3	Kashima Antlers	Yamaha Stadium	13,577
17	2018.07.22	Hokkaido Consadole Sapporo	0-0	Júbilo Iwata	Sapporo Atsubetsu Stadium	10,723
18	2018.07.28	Sagan Tosu	0-0	Júbilo Iwata	Best Amenity Stadium	14,333
19	2018.08.01	Júbilo Iwata	1-1	Gamba Osaka	Yamaha Stadium	13,015
20	2018.08.05	Júbilo Iwata	3-2	Vegalta Sendai	Yamaha Stadium	12,496
21	2018.08.11	Vissel Kobe	2-1	Júbilo Iwata	Noevir Stadium Kobe	24,731
22	2018.08.15	Urawa Reds	4-0	Júbilo Iwata	Saitama Stadium 2002	33,824
23	2018.08.19	Júbilo Iwata	2-0	Kashiwa Reysol	Yamaha Stadium	13,515
24	2018.08.24	Kashima Antlers	1-1	Júbilo Iwata	Kashima Soccer Stadium	13,575
25	2018.09.01	Júbilo Iwata	1-6	Nagoya Grampus	Yamaha Stadium	13,647
26	2018.09.14	Cerezo Osaka	1-1	Júbilo Iwata	Kincho Stadium	13,112
27	2018.09.22	Júbilo Iwata	1-2	Yokohama F. Marinos	Yamaha Stadium	13,451
29	2018.10.07	Shimizu S-Pulse	5-1	Júbilo Iwata	IAI Stadium Nihondaira	19,159
30	2018.10.21	V-Varen Nagasaki	0-0	Júbilo Iwata	Transcosmos Stadium Nagasaki	15,502
28	2018.10.30	Júbilo Iwata	1-0	Shonan Bellmare	Yamaha Stadium	9,026
31	2018.11.03	Júbilo Iwata	3-2	Sanfrecce Hiroshima	Yamaha Stadium	14,657
32	2018.11.10	FC Tokyo	0-0	Júbilo Iwata	Ajinomoto Stadium	24,323
33	2018.11.24	Júbilo Iwata	0-2	Hokkaido Consadole Sapporo	Yamaha Stadium	14,051
34	2018.12.01	Kawasaki Frontale	2-1	Júbilo Iwata	Kawasaki Todoroki Stadium	24,062
