= Yoshiaki Ota =

Japanese footballer

Yoshiaki Ota 太田 吉彰
Personal information
- Full name: Yoshiaki Ota
- Date of birth: 11 June 1983 (age 43)
- Place of birth: Hamamatsu, Japan
- Height: 1.76 m (5 ft 9 1/2 in)
- Position: Midfielder

Youth career
- 1996–2001: Júbilo Iwata

Senior career*
Years	Team	Apps	(Gls)
2002–2009	Júbilo Iwata	115	(21)
2010–2014	Vegalta Sendai	153	(12)
2015–2019	Júbilo Iwata	81	(7)
Medal record
Júbilo Iwata
Winner	J1 League	2002
Runner-up	J1 League	2003
Winner	Emperor's Cup	2003
Runner-up	Emperor's Cup	2004
Vegalta Sendai
Runner-up	J1 League	2012
- * Club domestic league appearances and goals as of end of 2019 season

Yoshiaki Ota (太田 吉彰, Ōta Yoshiaki; born 11 June 1983) is a Japanese former professional footballer who played as a midfielder. His elder brother Keisuke Ota is also former footballer.

== Club career ==
Ota was born in Hamamatsu on 11 June 1983. He joined J1 League club Júbilo Iwata for youth team in 2002. He became a regular player as right side midfielder in 2005. However his opportunity to play decreased behind new player Yuichi Komano from 2008. In July 2009, he left the club aims to transfer to Europe. However he could not transfer to Europe. After half year blank, he joined Vegalta Sendai in 2010. Although he could not play many matches in 2010, he played many matches as forward in 2011. In 2012, he became a regular player as his original position, right side midfielder and Vegalta finished at the 2nd place which is best results in the club history. He played all 34 matches for 3 years in a row (2012-2014). In 2015, he re-joined Júbilo Iwata for the first time in 6 years. Although Júbilo was relegated to J2 League from 2014, he played many matches and Júbilo was promoted to J1 end of 2015 season. However his opportunity to play decreased from 2017 season.

== National team career ==
In 2007, Ota was selected Japan national team for 2007 Asian Cup. Although he did not play in the match, Japan won the 4th place.

== Club statistics ==
As of end of 2019 season

Club performance			League		Cup		League Cup		Continental		Total	
Season	Club	League	Apps	Goals	Apps	Goals	Apps	Goals	Apps	Goals	Apps	Goals
Japan			League		Emperor's Cup		J.League Cup		AFC		Total	
2002	Júbilo Iwata	J1 League	0	0	0	0	0	0	-		0	0
2003	Júbilo Iwata	J1 League	0	0	1	0	0	0	-		1	0
2004	Júbilo Iwata	J1 League	7	1	1	0	1	0	1	0	10	1
2005	Júbilo Iwata	J1 League	30	7	2	0	2	0	3	0	37	7
2006	Júbilo Iwata	J1 League	32	9	3	0	8	1	-		43	10
2007	Júbilo Iwata	J1 League	32	4	2	1	6	1	-		40	6
2008	Júbilo Iwata	J1 League	1	0	2	1	2	0	-		5	1
2009	Júbilo Iwata	J1 League	13	0	0	0	5	0	-		18	0
Total			115	21	11	2	24	2	4	0	154	25
2010	Vegalta Sendai	J1 League	21	0	1	0	8	2	–		30	2
2011	Vegalta Sendai	J1 League	30	4	3	1	4	0	–		37	5
2012	Vegalta Sendai	J1 League	34	4	2	0	7	1	–		43	5
2013	Vegalta Sendai	J1 League	34	2	4	0	2	0	6	0	46	2
2014	Vegalta Sendai	J1 League	34	2	1	0	5	0	–		40	2
Total			153	12	11	1	26	3	6	0	196	16
2015	Júbilo Iwata	J2 League	39	4	0	0	–		–		39	4
2016	Júbilo Iwata	J1 League	34	3	0	0	1	0	–		35	3
2017	Júbilo Iwata	J1 League	8	0	3	0	3	0	–		14	0
2018	Júbilo Iwata	J1 League	0	0	3	0	6	1	–		9	1
2019	Júbilo Iwata	J1 League	0	0	1	0	4	0	–		5	0
Total			81	7	7	0	14	1	–		102	8
Career total			349	40	29	3	64	6	10	0	452	49
