= Chiharu Kato =

Japanese footballer

Personal information
- Date of birth: 11 April 1994 (age 32)
- Place of birth: Saitama, Japan
- Height: 1.74 m (5 ft 9 in)
- Position: Left-back

Team information
- Current team: Júbilo Iwata
- Number: 41

Youth career
- Konan Minami SSS
- –2011: Urawa Red Diamonds
- 2013–2014: Seibudai High School

College career
Years	Team	Apps	(Gls)
2015–2018	Senshu University		

Senior career*
Years	Team	Apps	(Gls)
2019	Rochedale Rovers	5	(1)
2020	Kajaani	12	(1)
2021–	Júbilo Iwata	0	(0)
- * Club domestic league appearances and goals as of 17:04, 27 October 2021 (UTC)

Chiharu Kato (加藤 智陽, Kato Chiharu; born 11 April 1996) is a Japanese footballer currently playing as a left-back for Júbilo Iwata.

== Club career ==
Kato made his professional debut for Júbilo Iwata in a 2–0 Emperor's Cup win against Oita Trinita.

== Career statistics ==
=== Club ===
As of 27 October 2021.

Club	Season	League			National Cup		League Cup		Other		Total	
Club	Season	Division	Apps	Goals	Apps	Goals	Apps	Goals	Apps	Goals	Apps	Goals
Rochedale Rovers	2019	FQPL	5	1	0	0	–		0	0	5	1
Kajaani	2020	Ykkönen	12	1	0	0	–		0	0	12	1
Júbilo Iwata	2021	J2 League	0	0	1 (Note: Appearances in the Emperor's Cup)	0	0	0	0	0	1	0
Career total			17	2	1	0	0	0	0	0	18	2
