= Hidenori Takahashi =

Japanese footballer

Hidenori Takahashi 高橋 秀典
Personal information
- Date of birth: 18 July 1998 (age 28)
- Place of birth: Chiba, Chiba, Japan
- Height: 1.72 m (5 ft 8 in)
- Position: Defender

Team information
- Current team: Blaublitz Akita
- Number: 22

Youth career
- –2010: Buddy SC Chiba
- 2012–2013: Wings
- 2014–2016: Aomori Yamada High School

College career
Years	Team	Apps	(Gls)
2017–2020	Osaka University of H&SS		

Senior career*
Years	Team	Apps	(Gls)
2021–2025	Renofa Yamaguchi	43	(0)
2025	→ Tochigi SC (loan)	33	(1)
2026–	Blaublitz Akita	15	(1)
- * Club domestic league appearances and goals as of 21:49, 13 May 2026 (UTC)

Hidenori Takahashi (高橋 秀典, Takahashi Hidenori; born 29 July 1999) is a Japanese footballer currently playing as a defender for J2 League club Blaublitz Akita.

== Career ==
On 28 December 2020, Takahashi was promoted to the team from the 2021 season. He made his league debut against Kyoto Sanga on 24 October 2021.

In January 2026, Takahashi made a permanent transfer to J2 League club Blaublitz Akita.

== Career statistics ==
=== Club ===
As of 13 May 2026

Appearances and goals by club, season and competition
Club	Season	League			National cup (Note: Includes Emperor Cup)		League cup (Note: Includes J.League Cup)		Total	
Club	Season	Division	Apps	Goals	Apps	Goals	Apps	Goals	Apps	Goals
Renofa Yamaguchi	2021	J2 League	3	0	0	0	0	0	3	0
Renofa Yamaguchi	2022	J2 League	13	0	1	0	0	0	14	0
Renofa Yamaguchi	2023	J2 League	25	0	1	0	0	0	26	0
Renofa Yamaguchi	2024	J2 League	2	0	0	0	1	0	3	0
Renofa Yamaguchi	Total		43	0	2	0	1	0	46	0
Tochigi SC (loan)	2025	J3 League	33	1	1	1	2	0	36	2
Blaublitz Akita	2026	J2/J3 (100)	15	1	–		–		15	1
Career total			91	2	3	1	3	0	97	3
