= Takafumi Shimizu =

Japanese footballer

Takafumi Shimizu 清水貴文
Personal information
- Full name: Takafumi Shimizu
- Date of birth: 30 June 1992 (age 34)
- Place of birth: Gunma, Japan
- Height: 1.70 m (5 ft 7 in)
- Position: Midfielder

Team information
- Current team: Tochigi Uva FC
- Number: 17

Youth career
- 2011–2014: Chukyo University FC

Senior career*
Years	Team	Apps	(Gls)
2015–2017	Júbilo Iwata	13	(0)
2017	→ Mito HollyHock (loan)	3	(0)
2018–	Tochigi Uva FC		
- * Club domestic league appearances and goals as of 23 February 2018

Takafumi Shimizu (清水貴文, Shimizu Takafumi; born 30 June 1992 in Gunma) is a Japanese footballer who plays for Tochigi City.

== Career ==
After playing for three seasons with Júbilo Iwata and going on loan to Mito HollyHock, Shimizu joined Tochigi Uva FC in March 2018.

== Career statistics ==
Updated to 23 February 2018.

Appearances and goals by club, season and competition
Club	Season	League			Emperor's Cup		J.League Cup		Total	
Club	Season	Division	Apps	Goals	Apps	Goals	Apps	Goals	Apps	Goals
Júbilo Iwata	2015	J2 League	12	0	2	1	—		14	1
Júbilo Iwata	2016	J1 League	1	0	2	0	4	0	7	0
Júbilo Iwata	2017	J1 League	0	0	0	0	—		0	0
Mito HollyHock	2017	J2 League	3	0	1	0	—		4	0
Career total			16	0	5	1	4	0	25	1
