= Kensuke Fujiwara =

Japanese footballer

Personal information
- Date of birth: 21 December 2003 (age 22)
- Place of birth: Iwata Shizuoka, Japan
- Height: 1.77 m (5 ft 10 in)
- Position: Midfielder

Team information
- Current team: Júbilo Iwata
- Number: 77

Youth career
- Buddy FC
- 2016–2021: Júbilo Iwata

Senior career*
Years	Team	Apps	(Gls)
2022-	Júbilo Iwata	27	(5)
2024	→ Giravanz Kitakyushu (loan)	20	(4)
2025	→ Tochigi SC (loan)	26	(1)
- * Club domestic league appearances and goals as of 14 August 2026

Kensuke Fujiwara (藤原 健介, Fujiwara Kensuke; born 21 December 2003) is a Japanese footballer currently playing as a midfielder for Júbilo Iwata.

== Career statistics ==
=== Club ===
As of 2 March 2022.

Club	Season	League			National Cup		League Cup		Other		Total	
Club	Season	Division	Apps	Goals	Apps	Goals	Apps	Goals	Apps	Goals	Apps	Goals
Júbilo Iwata	2021	J2 League	0	0	3 (Note: Appearances in the Emperor's Cup)	0	0	0	0	0	3	0
Júbilo Iwata	2022	J1 League	0	0	0	0	1 (Note: Appearances in the J.League Cup)	0	0	0	1	0
Career total			0	0	3	0	1	0	0	0	4	0
