= Ko Matsubara =

Japanese footballer

Personal information
- Full name: Ko Matsubara
- Date of birth: 30 August 1996 (age 30)
- Place of birth: Hamamatsu, Japan
- Height: 1.82 m (6 ft 0 in)
- Position: Left back

Team information
- Current team: Júbilo Iwata
- Number: 4

Youth career
- FC Estrella
- Júbilo Iwata
- 2012–2014: Hamamatsu Kaiseikan High School

Senior career*
Years	Team	Apps	(Gls)
2015–2020	Shimizu S-Pulse	133	(5)
2015	→ J.League U-22 (loan)	3	(0)
2020–2022	Sint-Truiden	15	(0)
2022–	Júbilo Iwata	131	(13)
- * Club domestic league appearances and goals as of 14 August 2026

Ko Matsubara (松原后, Matsubara Ko; born 30 August 1996 in Hamamatsu) is a Japanese footballer who plays for J.League club Júbilo Iwata.

== Career statistics ==
Updated to 18 February 2019.

Appearances and goals by club, season and competition
Club	Season	League			Emperor's Cup		J.League Cup		Total	
Club	Season	Division	Apps	Goals	Apps	Goals	Apps	Goals	Apps	Goals
Shimizu S-Pulse	2015	J1 League	7	0	0	0	4	0	11	0
Shimizu S-Pulse	2016	J2 League	28	1	2	0	-		30	1
Shimizu S-Pulse	2017	J1 League	32	2	2	0	3	0	37	2
Shimizu S-Pulse	2018	J1 League	32	0	2	0	1	0	35	0
Career total			99	3	6	0	8	0	113	3
