= Dudu Pacheco =

Brazilian footballer (born 1997)

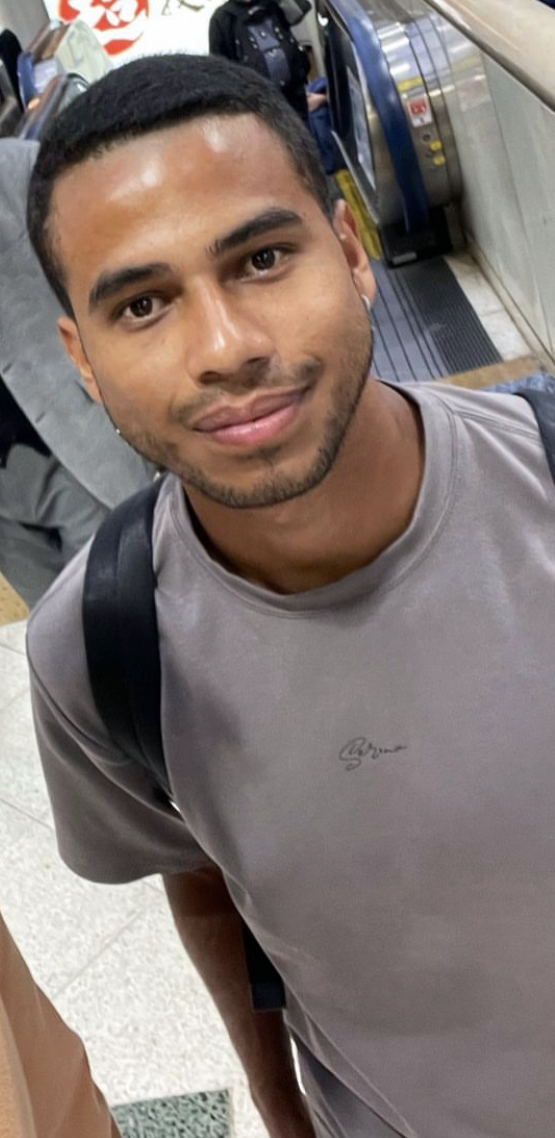
- Dudu Pacheco in 2024

Personal information
- Full name: Luiz Eduardo Fleuri Pacheco
- Date of birth: 1 February 1997 (age 29)
- Place of birth: Manacapuru, Brazil
- Height: 1.70 m (5 ft 7 in)
- Positions: Defensive midfielder; right-back

Team information
- Current team: JEF United Chiba
- Number: 6

Youth career
- –2016: Vila Nova
- 2016: → Grêmio (loan)

Senior career*
| Years | Team | Apps | (Gls) |
| 2014–2016 | Vila Nova | 15 | (0) |
| 2017–2019 | Grêmio | 1 | (0) |
| 2018 | → Vila Nova (loan) | 11 | (0) |
| 2018 | → Remo (loan) | 3 | (0) |
| 2018–2019 | → Votuporanguense (loan) | 14 | (1) |
| 2019–2020 | Jaraguá | 5 | (0) |
| 2020–2021 | Vila Nova | 67 | (3) |
| 2022–2023 | Júbilo Iwata | 41 | (9) |
| 2024– | JEF United Chiba | 55 | (6) |

International career
| 2019 | Brazil (University) | 5 | (3) |
- * Club domestic league appearances and goals as of 12 August 2026

Luiz Eduardo Fleuri Pacheco (born 1 February 1997), commonly known as Dudu Pacheco, is a Brazilian professional footballer who plays as a defensive midfielder or a right back and currently play for J1 League club, JEF United Chiba.

== Career statistics ==
=== Club ===
As of the start for 2025 season.

| Club | Season | League | | | State League | | Cup | | League Cup | | Other | | Total | |
| Club | Season | Division | Apps | Goals | Apps | Goals | Apps | Goals | Apps | Goals | Apps | Goals | Apps | Goals |
|---|---|---|---|---|---|---|---|---|---|---|---|---|---|---|
| Vila Nova | 2014 | Série B | 1 | 0 | 0 | 0 | 0 | 0 | — | | — | | 1 | 0 |
| Vila Nova | 2015 | Série C | 0 | 0 | 0 | 0 | 0 | 0 | — | | — | | 0 | 0 |
| Vila Nova | 2016 | Série B | 4 | 0 | 10 (Note: Appearances in the Campeonato Goiano) | 0 | 0 | 0 | — | | 5 (Note: Appearances in the Copa Verde) | 2 | 19 | 2 |
| Vila Nova | Total | | 5 | 0 | 10 | 0 | 0 | 0 | 0 | 0 | 5 | 2 | 20 | 2 |
| Grêmio | 2017 | Série A | — | | — | | 0 | 0 | — | | 1 (Note: Appearances in the Primeira Liga) | 0 | 1 | 0 |
| Vila Nova (loan) | 2018 | Série B | — | | 11 | 0 | 3 (Note: Appearances in the Copa do Brasil) | 0 | — | | 0 | 0 | 14 | 0 |
| Remo (loan) | 2018 | Série C | 3 | 0 | — | | — | | — | | — | | 3 | 0 |
| Votuporanguense (loan) | 2018 | — | | | — | | — | | — | | 12 (Note: Appearances in the Copa Paulista) | 1 | 12 | 1 |
| Votuporanguense (loan) | 2019 | — | | | 14 (Note: Appearances in the Campeonato Paulista Segunda Divisão) | 1 | 1 | 0 | — | | — | | 15 | 1 |
| Votuporanguense (loan) | Total | | 0 | 0 | 14 | 1 | 1 | 0 | 0 | 0 | 12 | 1 | 27 | 1 |
| Jaraguá | 2020 | — | | | 5 | 0 | — | | — | | — | | 5 | 0 |
| Vila Nova | 2020 | Série C | 24 | 1 | 1 | 0 | 0 | 0 | — | | 5 | 0 | 30 | 1 |
| Vila Nova | 2021 | Série B | 28 | 2 | 14 | 0 | 4 | 0 | — | | 1 | 0 | 47 | 2 |
| Vila Nova | Total | | 52 | 3 | 15 | 0 | 4 | 0 | 0 | 0 | 6 | 0 | 77 | 3 |
| Júbilo Iwata | 2022 | J1 League | 2 | 0 | — | | 3 (Note: Appearances in the Emperor's Cup) | 0 | 1 (Note: Appearances in the J.League Cup) | 0 | — | | 6 | 0 |
| Júbilo Iwata | 2023 | J2 League | 39 | 9 | — | | 0 | 0 | 1 | 0 | — | | 40 | 9 |
| Júbilo Iwata | Total | | 41 | 9 | 0 | 0 | 3 | 0 | 2 | 0 | 0 | 0 | 46 | 9 |
| JEF United Chiba | 2024 | J2 League | 19 | 3 | — | | 1 | 0 | 1 | 0 | — | | 21 | 3 |
| JEF United Chiba | 2025 | J2 League | 0 | 0 | — | | 0 | 0 | 0 | 0 | — | | 0 | 0 |
| JEF United Chiba | Total | | 19 | 3 | 0 | 0 | 1 | 0 | 1 | 0 | 0 | 0 | 21 | 3 |
| Career total | | | 120 | 15 | 55 | 1 | 11 | 0 | 2 | 0 | 24 | 3 | 212 | 19 |
