= So Nakagawa =

Japanese footballer

So Nakagawa 中川 創
Personal information
- Full name: So Nakagawa
- Date of birth: June 1, 1999 (age 27)
- Place of birth: Chiba, Japan
- Height: 1.84 m (6 ft 1/2 in)
- Position: Centre-back

Team information
- Current team: Fujieda MYFC
- Number: 4

Youth career
- 2012–2017: Kashiwa Reysol

Senior career*
Years	Team	Apps	(Gls)
2018–2019	Kashiwa Reysol	2	(0)
2019	→ SC Sagamihara (loan)	13	(0)
2020–2024	Júbilo Iwata	21	(1)
2021–2022	→ FC Ryukyu (loan)	18	(0)
2023	→ Fujieda MYFC (loan)	9	(0)
2024–	Fujieda MYFC	81	(0)
- * Club domestic league appearances and goals as of 13 August 2026

So Nakagawa (中川 創, Nakagawa Sō; born June 1, 1999) is a Japanese professional footballer who plays as a centre-back for Fujieda MYFC.

== Playing career ==
Nakagawa was born in Chiba Prefecture on June 1, 1999. He joined J1 League club Kashiwa Reysol from youth team in 2018. On 30 December 2019 it was confirmed, that Nakagawa had joined Júbilo Iwata.

== Club statistics ==
Updated to end of 2018 season.

Club performance			League		Cup		League Cup		Continental		Total	
Season	Club	League	Apps	Goals	Apps	Goals	Apps	Goals	Apps	Goals	Apps	Goals
Japan			League		Emperor's Cup		J. League Cup		AFC		Total	
2017	Kashiwa Reysol	J1 League	0	0	0	0	0	0	-		0	0
2018	Kashiwa Reysol	J1 League	1	0	0	0	2	0	0	0	3	0
Total			1	0	0	0	2	0	0	0	3	0
