= Kōki Ogawa (footballer) =

Japanese footballer

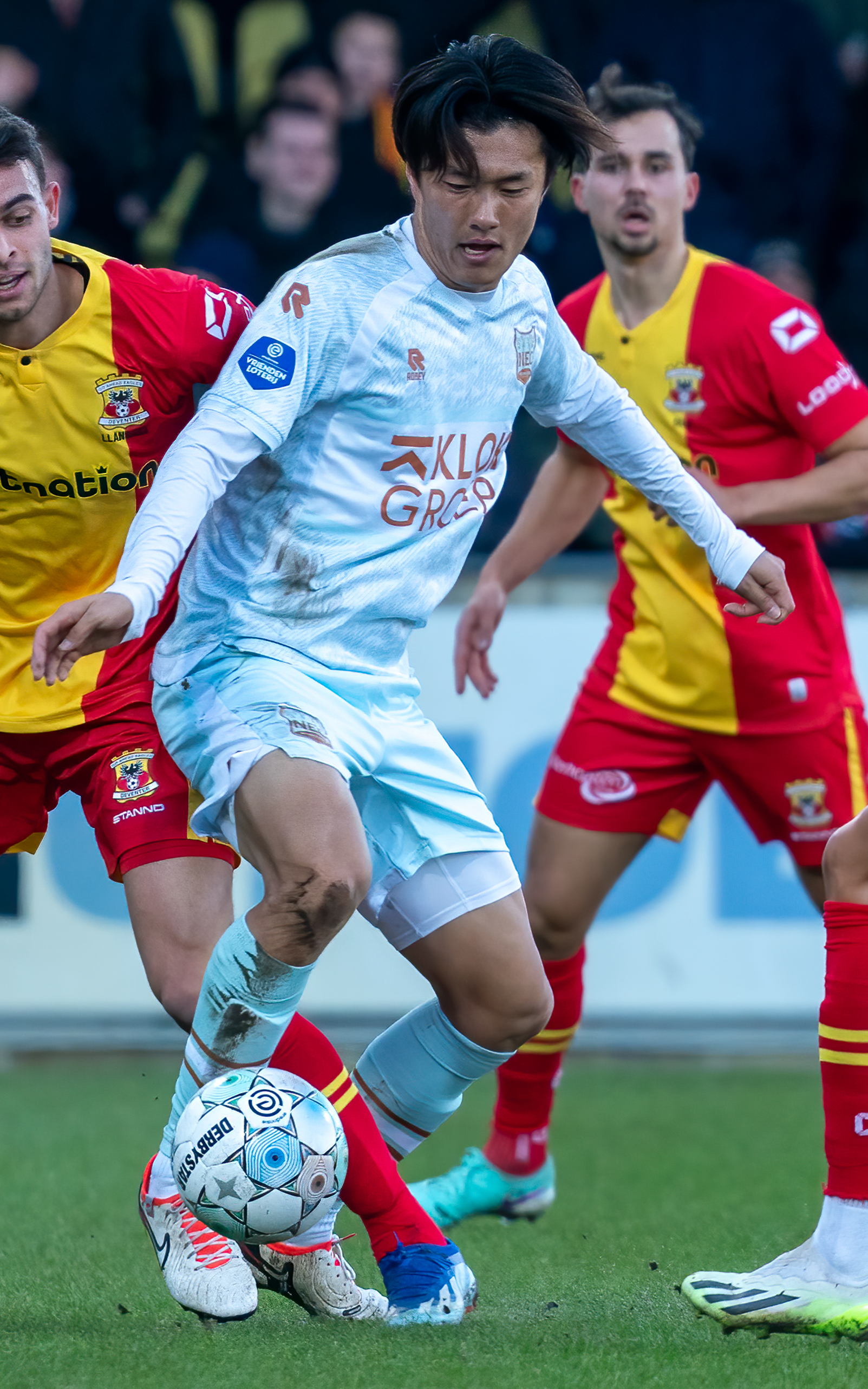
- Ogawa with NEC Nijmegen in 2024

Personal information
- Date of birth: 8 August 1997 (age 29)
- Place of birth: Yokohama, Kanagawa, Japan
- Height: 1.86 m (6 ft 1 in)
- Position: Forward

Team information
- Current team: Machida Zelvia
- Number: 9

Youth career
- Yokohama Kohoku SC
- Mamedo FC
- 2013–2015: Toko Gakuen High School

Senior career*
Years	Team	Apps	(Gls)
2016–2021	Júbilo Iwata	79	(11)
2019	→ Mito HollyHock (loan)	17	(7)
2022–2024	Yokohama FC	56	(32)
2023–2024	→ NEC Nijmegen (loan)	31	(11)
2024–2026	NEC Nijmegen	50	(15)
2026–	Machida Zelvia	0	(0)

International career^{‡}
	Japan U18	18	(15)
2015–2016	Japan U19	15	(7)
2015–2017	Japan U20	3	(1)
2020	Japan U23	5	(2)
2019–	Japan	19	(11)
Medal record
Representing Japan
EAFF Championship
Runner-up	2019 South Korea	Team
AFC U-19 Championship
Gold medal – first place	2016 Bahrain
- * Club domestic league appearances and goals as of 21 May 2026 ‡ National team caps and goals as of 14 November 2026

Kōki Ogawa (小川 航基, Ogawa Kōki; born 8 August 1997) is a Japanese professional footballer who plays as a forward for J.league club Machida Zelvia and the Japan national team.

== Club career ==
Kōki Ogawa joined J1 League club Júbilo Iwata in 2016. On 6 April, he debuted in J.League Cup (v Ventforet Kofu).

Ogawa joined J2 League club, Mito HollyHock in 2019 on loan from Júbilo Iwata.

On 27 December 2021, Ogawa joined J2 club Yokohama FC for the 2022 season. At the end of the 2022 season, Yokohama FC gained promotion to the J1 League, with Ogawa contributing 26 goals during the season. As well as being the league's top scorer, he was named in the J2 League Best XI and won the overall J2 MVP award.

In July 2023, Ogawa signed for Eredivisie club NEC Nijmegen on a season-long loan deal with the option to make the move permanent. On 21 March 2024, NEC exercised the purchase option and signed a three-year contract with Ogawa.

In 24 August 2026, Ogawa signed for J.League club Machida Zelvia for an undisclosed fee.

== International career ==
In May 2017, Ogawa was elected Japan U-20 national team for 2017 U-20 World Cup. At this tournament, he played first two matches. He scored a goal against South Africa in first match. However, because he was injured in second match against Uruguay, he could not play in later matches.

In December 2019, Kōki Ogawa was named in the senior squad to represent Japan in the East Asia Cup finals. Ogawa scored his first hat-trick against Hong Kong in his senior debut.

On 18 November 2024, Ogawa scored two goals against China, representing Japan in the 2024 World Cup Asian Qualifier. Both goals were headers and demonstratred Ogawa's ability as a center forward for Japan.

On 15 May 2026, Ogawa was selected in the 26-man squad for the 2026 FIFA World Cup.

== Career statistics ==
=== Club ===
As of match played 31 May 2026

Appearances and goals by club, season and competition
Club	Season	League			National cup (Note: Includes Emperor's Cup, KNVB Cup)		League cup (Note: Includes J. League Cup)		Other		Total	
Club	Season	Division	Apps	Goals	Apps	Goals	Apps	Goals	Apps	Goals	Apps	Goals
Júbilo Iwata	2016	J1 League	0	0	1	0	2	0	—		3	0
Júbilo Iwata	2017	J1 League	5	0	0	0	5	4	—		10	4
Júbilo Iwata	2018	J1 League	13	1	2	1	4	0	1 (Note: Appearance in J1/J2 play-offs)	1	20	3
Júbilo Iwata	2019	J1 League	5	0	0	0	5	0	—		10	0
Júbilo Iwata	2020	J2 League	32	9	0	0	0	0	—		32	9
Júbilo Iwata	2021	J2 League	24	1	3	4	0	0	—		27	5
Júbilo Iwata	Total		79	11	6	5	16	4	1	1	102	21
Mito Hollyhock (loan)	2019	J2 League	17	7	—		—		—		17	7
Yokohama FC	2022	J2 League	41	26	—		—		—		41	26
Yokohama FC	2023	J1 League	15	6	0	0	0	0	—		15	6
Yokohama FC	Total		56	32	0	0	0	0	0	0	56	32
NEC Nijmegen (loan)	2023–24	Eredivisie	31	11	5	4	—		1 (Note: Appearance in UEFA Europa League qualification play-offs)	0	37	15
NEC Nijmegen	2024–25	Eredivisie	24	7	2	2	—		—		26	9
NEC Nijmegen	2025–26	Eredivisie	26	8	3	1	—		0	0	29	9
NEC Nijmegen	NEC total		81	26	10	7	—		1	0	92	34
Career total			233	76	16	12	16	4	2	1	267	94

=== International ===
As of match played 14 November 2026

Appearances and goals by national team and year
National team	Year	Apps	Goals
Japan	2019	1	3
Japan	2024	8	6
Japan	2025	4	1
Japan	2026	6	1
Total		19	11

Scores and results list Japan's goal tally first, score column indicates score after each Ogawa goal.

List of international goals scored by Kōki Ogawa
No.	Date	Venue	Opponent	Score	Result	Competition
1	14 December 2019	Busan Gudeok Stadium, Busan, South Korea	Hong Kong	3–0	5–0	2019 EAFF E-1 Football Championship
2	14 December 2019	Busan Gudeok Stadium, Busan, South Korea	Hong Kong	4–0	5–0	2019 EAFF E-1 Football Championship
3	14 December 2019	Busan Gudeok Stadium, Busan, South Korea	Hong Kong	5–0	5–0	2019 EAFF E-1 Football Championship
4	6 June 2024	Thuwunna Stadium, Yangon, Myanmar	Myanmar	3–0	5–0	2026 FIFA World Cup qualification
5	6 June 2024	Thuwunna Stadium, Yangon, Myanmar	Myanmar	4–0	5–0	2026 FIFA World Cup qualification
6	10 September 2024	Bahrain National Stadium, Riffa, Bahrain	Bahrain	5–0	5–0	2026 FIFA World Cup qualification
7	10 October 2024	King Abdullah Sports City, Jeddah, Saudi Arabia	Saudi Arabia	2–0	2–0	2026 FIFA World Cup qualification
8	19 November 2024	Xiamen Egret Stadium, Xiamen, China	China	1–0	3–1	2026 FIFA World Cup qualification
9	19 November 2024	Xiamen Egret Stadium, Xiamen, China	China	3–1	3–1	2026 FIFA World Cup qualification
10	10 October 2025	Suita City Football Stadium, Suita, Japan	Paraguay	1–1	2–2	2025 Kirin Challenge Cup
11	31 May 2026	Japan National Stadium, Tokyo, Japan	Iceland	1–0	1–0	2026 Kirin Challenge Cup

== Honours ==
Júbilo Iwata

- J2 League: 2021

Japan U19

- AFC U-19 Championship: 2016

Individual

- EAFF Championship top scorer: 2019
- J2 League MVP: 2022
- J2 League top scorer: 2022
- J2 League Best XI: 2022
