= Naoto Miki =

Japanese footballer

Personal information
- Date of birth: 8 May 2001 (age 25)
- Place of birth: Mie Prefecture, Japan
- Height: 1.72 m (5 ft 8 in)
- Positions: Forward; winger

Team information
- Current team: Gainare Tottori
- Number: 10

Youth career
- 2017–2019: Júbilo Iwata

Senior career*
Years	Team	Apps	(Gls)
2020–2024	Júbilo Iwata	20	(4)
2022	→ Fujieda MYFC (loan)	11	(0)
2023-2024	→ Fukushima United (Loan)	9	(0)
2024-	Gainare Tottori	79	(14)
- * Club domestic league appearances and goals as of 24 August 2026

Naoto Miki (born 8 May 2001) is a Japanese professional footballer who plays as a forward or a winger for Gainare Tottori.

== Early life ==
Naoto was born in Mie.

== Career ==
Naoto made his league debut for Jubilo against Kyoto Sanga on 28 June 2020. He scored his first goal for the club against V-Varen Nagasaki on 14 October 2020, scoring in the 47th minute.

Naoto made his league debut for Fujieda against Gainare Tottori on 12 March 2022.

Naoto made his league debut for Fukushima United on 12 April 2023.
