= Kaito Suzuki =

Japanese association football player

Kaito Suzuki 鈴木 海音
Personal information
- Full name: Kaito Suzuki
- Date of birth: 25 August 2002 (age 24)
- Place of birth: Hamamatsu, Shizuoka, Japan
- Height: 1.82 m (6 ft 0 in)
- Position: Centre back

Team information
- Current team: Tokyo Verdy
- Number: 15

Youth career
- Wada Higashi SSS
- –2014: Hamamatsu Wada JFC
- 2015–2020: Júbilo Iwata

Senior career*
Years	Team	Apps	(Gls)
2020–2024	Júbilo Iwata	31	(1)
2022	→ Tochigi SC (loan)	34	(0)
2025–	Tokyo Verdy	26	(0)

International career^{‡}
2017	Japan U15	15	(1)
2018	Japan U16	12	(0)
2019	Japan U17	11	(0)
Medal record
Men's football
Representing Japan
AFC U-23 Asian Cup
Bronze medal – third place	2022 Uzbekistan	Team
Gold medal – first place	2024 Qatar	Team
- * Club domestic league appearances and goals as of 8 August 2026 ‡ National team caps and goals as of 17:04, 20 August 2020 (UTC)

Kaito Suzuki (鈴木 海音, Suzuki Kaito; born 25 August 2002) is a Japanese professional footballer who plays as a centre back for J1 League club Tokyo Verdy.

== Career ==
In December 2024, it was announced that Suzuki would be moving to Tokyo Verdy ahead of the 2025 season.

== International career ==
On 4 April 2024, Suzuki was called up to the Japan U23 squad for the 2024 AFC U-23 Asian Cup.

== Career statistics ==
=== Club ===
As of end of 2024 season

Appearances and goals by club, season and competition
Club	Season	League			National Cup		League Cup		Other		Total	
Club	Season	Division	Apps	Goals	Apps	Goals	Apps	Goals	Apps	Goals	Apps	Goals
Japan			League		Emperor's Cup		J. League Cup		Other		Total	
Júbilo Iwata	2020	J2 League	6	0	0	0	–		–		6	0
Júbilo Iwata	2021	J2 League	0	0	3	0	–		–		3	0
Júbilo Iwata	2023	J2 League	22	1	1	0	2	0	–		25	1
Júbilo Iwata	2024	J1 League	24	1	0	0	0	0	–		24	1
Júbilo Iwata	Total		52	2	4	0	2	0	0	0	58	2
Tochigi SC (loan)	2022	J2 League	34	0	1	0	–		–		35	0
Career total			86	2	5	0	2	0	0	0	93	2

== Honours ==
Japan U16

- AFC U-16 Championship: 2018

Japan U23

- AFC U-23 Asian Cup: 2024
