= Riku Morioka =

Japanese footballer

Personal information
- Date of birth: 20 November 1998 (age 27)
- Place of birth: Takahashi, Okayama, Japan
- Height: 1.81 m (5 ft 11 in)
- Position: Centre back

Team information
- Current team: Montedio Yamagata
- Number: 38

Youth career
- Tenma SC
- –2016: Júbilo Iwata

College career
Years	Team	Apps	(Gls)
2017–2020	Hosei University		

Senior career*
Years	Team	Apps	(Gls)
2020–2026	Júbilo Iwata	57	(1)
2026–	Montedio Yamagata	1	(0)

International career
2014	Japan U16		
2015	Japan U17		
2016	Japan U18	3	(0)
- * Club domestic league appearances and goals as of 13 August 2026

Riku Morioka (森岡 陸, Morioka Riku; born 20 November 1998) is a Japanese footballer currently playing as a centre back for Montedio Yamagata.

== Career statistics ==
=== Club ===
As of 8 August 2022.

Club	Season	League			National Cup		League Cup		Other		Total	
Club	Season	Division	Apps	Goals	Apps	Goals	Apps	Goals	Apps	Goals	Apps	Goals
Hosei University	2019	–			4 (Note: Appearances in the Emperor's Cup)	1	–		0	0	4	1
Júbilo Iwata	2020	J2 League	0	0	0	0	–		0	0	0	0
Júbilo Iwata	2021	J2 League	14	1	2	0	–		0	0	16	1
Júbilo Iwata	2022	J1 League	9	0	3	0	4 (Note: Appearances in the J.League Cup)	0	0	0	16	0
Career total			25	1	9	1	4	0	0	0	38	2
