= Mahiro Yoshinaga =

Japanese footballer (born 2002)

Personal information
- Full name: Mahiro Yoshinaga
- Date of birth: 20 March 2002 (age 24)
- Place of birth: Tokyo, Japan
- Height: 1.74 m (5 ft 9 in)
- Position: Winger

Team information
- Current team: Giravanz Kitakyushu
- Number: 8

Youth career
- Minami Tanaka SC
- Tokyo Verdy
- –2016: FC Fuchu
- 2017–2019: Seiritsu Gakuen High School

Senior career*
Years	Team	Apps	(Gls)
2020–2026	Júbilo Iwata	32	(1)
2024	Kamatamare Sanuki (loan)	3	(0)
2025	Giravanz Kitakyushu (loan)	18	(3)
2026–	Giravanz Kitakyushu	18	(1)
- * Club domestic league appearances and goals as of 24 August 2026

Mahiro Yoshinaga (吉長 真優, Yoshinaga Mahiro; born 20 March 2002) is a Japanese footballer currently playing as a winger for Giravanz Kitakyushu.

== Early life ==
Mahiro was born in Tokyo. He played for Minami Tanaka SC, Tokyo Verdy, FC Fuchu and Seiritsu Gakuen High School in his youth.

== Career ==
Mahiro made his league debut for Júbilo Iwata against Ehime FC on the 8 November 2020. He scored his first goal for Jubilo against Kashiwa Reysol on the 3 September 2022, scoring in the 73rd minute.

== Career statistics ==
=== Club ===
As of 8 August 2022.

Appearances and goals by club, season and competition
Club	Season	League			Emperor's Cup		J. League Cup		Other		Total	
Club	Season	Division	Apps	Goals	Apps	Goals	Apps	Goals	Apps	Goals	Apps	Goals
Júbilo Iwata	2020	J2 League	5	0	0	0	0	0	0	0	5	0
Júbilo Iwata	2021	J2 League	0	0	3	0	0	0	0	0	3	0
Júbilo Iwata	2022	J1 League	13	0	3	1	6	0	0	0	22	1
Career total			18	0	6	1	6	0	0	0	30	1
