= Masaya Matsumoto =

Japanese footballer (born 1995)

Masaya Matsumoto 松本 昌也
Personal information
- Full name: Masaya Matsumoto
- Date of birth: 25 January 1995 (age 31)
- Place of birth: Nakatsu, Ōita, Japan
- Height: 1.75 m (5 ft 9 in)
- Position: Forward

Team information
- Current team: Fagiano Okayama
- Number: 28

Youth career
- Wada SC
- FC Nakatsu 1981
- 2007–2012: JFA Academy Fukushima

Senior career*
Years	Team	Apps	(Gls)
2013–2016	Oita Trinita	97	(5)
2017–2025	Júbilo Iwata	221	(18)
2025–	Fagiano Okayama	45	(3)

International career
2011	Japan U-17	5	(1)
2012	Japan U-20	4	(0)
- * Club domestic league appearances and goals as of 12 August 2026

Masaya Matsumoto (松本 昌也, Matsumoto Masaya; born 25 January 1995) is a Japanese professional footballer who plays forward for Fagiano Okayama in the J1 League.

Primarily known for his time at Júbilo Iwata with over 200 league appearances for the club, Matsumoto has spent most of his career in the J1 League and the J2 League.

== Career ==
On 19 October 2012, Matsumoto was announced at Oita Trinita from the 2013 season. He scored his first league goal against Albirex Niigata on 10 November 2013, scoring in the 40th minute. In 2016, he switched his jersey number to 10, becoming the first Japanese player in the history of the club to wear the number 10.

On 21 December 2016, Matsumoto was announced at Júbilo Iwata on a permanent transfer. After signing, he was described as a "key player" for the club, and was "highly praised" by manager Hiroshi Nanami. On 20 August 2018, he scored his first goal for the club against Kashiwa Reysol, which he dedicated to both his brother, and team captain Kentaro Oi. In November 2023, he won the November 2023 Meiji Yasuda J.League KONAMI Monthly MVP award for helping Júbilo Iwata get promoted to the J1 League. During the 2024 season, he made 35 league appearances.

On 23 February 2025, Matsumoto was announced at Fagiano Okayama on a permanent transfer.

== International career ==
Matsumoto played in all five games for the Japan U17 team during the 2011 FIFA U-17 World Cup in which Japan U17 made it to the quarter-finals of the tournament before bowing out to Brazil U17s.

== Personal life ==
Matsumoto looks up to Shunsuke Nakamura, who he later became teammates with at Júbilo Iwata.

== Career statistics ==
=== Club ===
Updated to 8 August 2022.

Club	Season	League			Emperor's Cup		J. League Cup		Total	
Club	Season	Division	Apps	Goals	Apps	Goals	Apps	Goals	Apps	Goals
Oita Trinita	2013	J1 League	9	1	0	0	4	0	13	1
Oita Trinita	2014	J2 League	28	2	0	0	-		28	2
Oita Trinita	2015	J2 League	32	1	3	0	-		35	1
Oita Trinita	2016	J3 League	28	1	1	0	-		29	1
Júbilo Iwata	2017	J1 League	18	0	4	1	5	0	27	1
Júbilo Iwata	2018	J1 League	15	1	2	0	8	0	25	1
Júbilo Iwata	2019	J1 League	34	2	1	1	0	0	35	3
Júbilo Iwata	2020	J2 League	36	2	-		-		36	2
Júbilo Iwata	2021	J2 League	40	4	2	0	-		42	4
Júbilo Iwata	2022	J1 League	21	0	2	0	3	1	26	1
Total			261	14	15	2	20	1	296	17
