= Hiroki Yamada (footballer) =

Japanese footballer (born 1988)

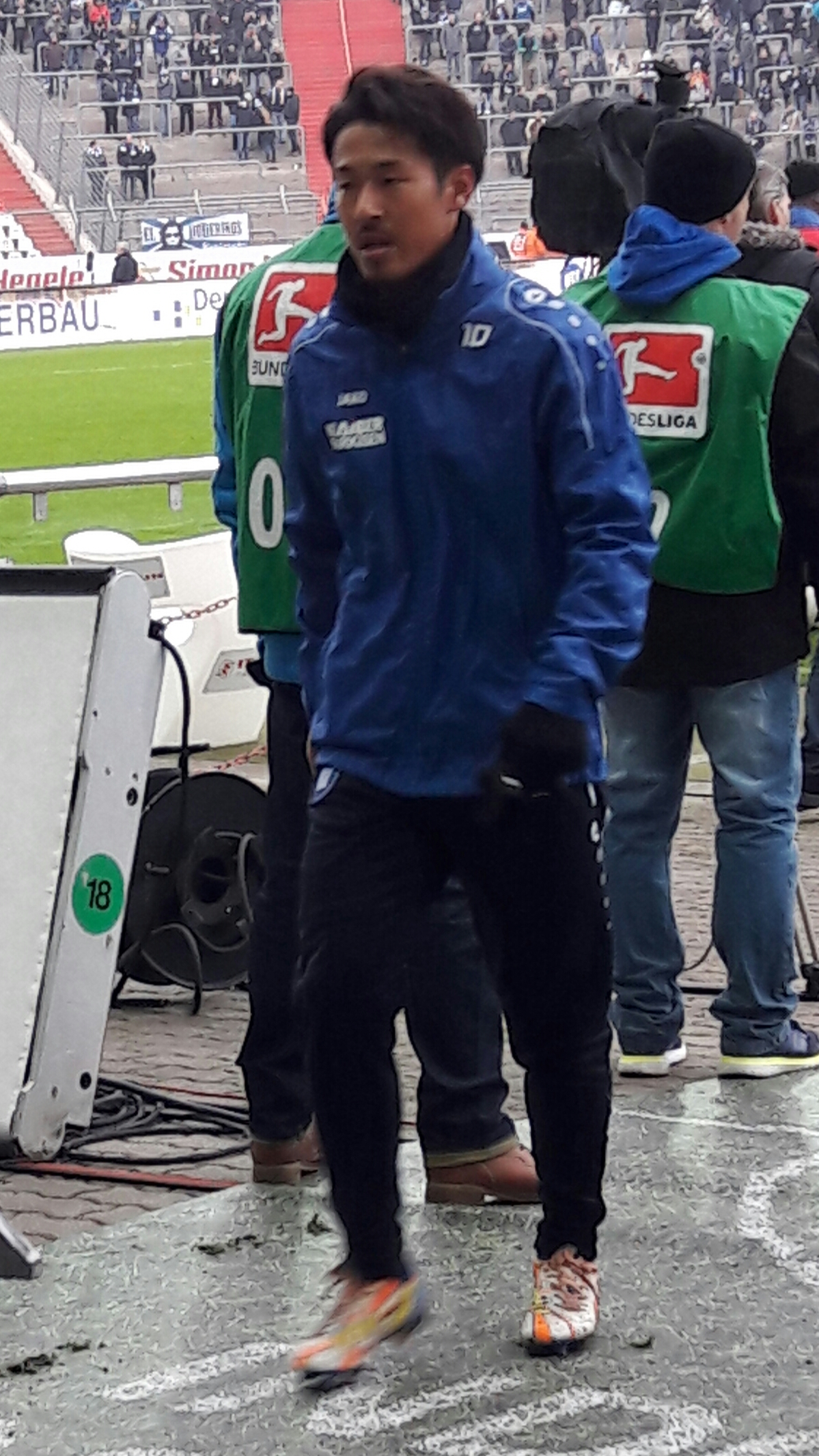
- Hiroki Yamada in 2016

Personal information
- Full name: Hiroki Yamada
- Date of birth: 27 December 1988 (age 37)
- Place of birth: Hamamatsu, Shizuoka, Japan
- Height: 1.74 m (5 ft 9 in)
- Positions: Attacking midfielder; winger

Youth career
- Yamaha Jubilo SS
- 2004–2006: Fujieda Higashi High School

College career
| Years | Team | Apps | (Gls) |
| 2007–2010 | Meiji University | | |

Senior career*
| Years | Team | Apps | (Gls) |
| 2011–2014 | Júbilo Iwata | 107 | (25) |
| 2014–2017 | Karlsruher SC | 88 | (10) |
| 2017–2024 | Júbilo Iwata | 176 | (23) |

International career^{‡}
| 2013 | Japan | 2 | (0) |
- * Club domestic league appearances and goals as of 5 November 2022, 12:22 (UTC) ‡ National team caps and goals as of 28 July 2013

Hiroki Yamada (山田 大記, Yamada Hiroki; born 27 December 1988) is a Japanese former professional footballer who played as an attacking midfielder or a winger.

== Career ==
In May 2017, following Karlsruher SC's relegation from the 2. Bundesliga in the 2017–18, Yamada announced his decision to leave the club ending a three-year spell there. In August 2017, he returned to Japan with Júbilo Iwata.

== Career statistics ==
As of the end 2022 season

Appearances and goals by club, season and competition
| Club | Season | League | | Cup | | League Cup | | Other^{1} | | Total | |
| Club | Season | Apps | Goals | Apps | Goals | Apps | Goals | Apps | Goals | Apps | Goals |
|---|---|---|---|---|---|---|---|---|---|---|---|
| Júbilo Iwata | 2011 | 29 | 5 | 2 | 0 | 5 | 0 | 1 | 0 | 37 | 5 |
| Júbilo Iwata | 2012 | 31 | 9 | 2 | 0 | 6 | 3 | — | | 39 | 12 |
| Júbilo Iwata | 2013 | 29 | 8 | 2 | 0 | 6 | 0 | — | | 37 | 8 |
| Júbilo Iwata | 2014 | 17 | 3 | 0 | 0 | 0 | 0 | — | | 17 | 3 |
| Júbilo Iwata | 2017 | 4 | 1 | 0 | 0 | 0 | 0 | — | | 4 | 1 |
| Júbilo Iwata | Total | 110 | 26 | 6 | 0 | 17 | 3 | 1 | 0 | 134 | 29 |
| Karlsruher SC | 2014–15 | 33 | 6 | 2 | 0 | — | | — | | 35 | 6 |
| Karlsruher SC | 2015–16 | 31 | 3 | 1 | 0 | — | | — | | 32 | 3 |
| Karlsruher SC | 2016–17 | 24 | 1 | 0 | 0 | — | | — | | 24 | 1 |
| Karlsruher SC | Total | 88 | 10 | 3 | 0 | 0 | 0 | 0 | 0 | 91 | 10 |
| Júbilo Iwata | 2017 | 5 | 1 | 1 | 0 | 0 | 0 | — | | 6 | 1 |
| Júbilo Iwata | 2018 | 32 | 2 | 2 | 1 | 3 | 0 | — | | 37 | 3 |
| Júbilo Iwata | 2019 | 23 | 1 | 0 | 0 | 0 | 0 | — | | 23 | 1 |
| Júbilo Iwata | 2020 | 40 | 3 | 0 | 0 | 0 | 0 | — | | 40 | 3 |
| Júbilo Iwata | 2021 | 38 | 11 | 0 | 0 | 0 | 0 | — | | 38 | 11 |
| Júbilo Iwata | 2022 | 7 | 0 | 0 | 0 | 0 | 0 | — | | 7 | 0 |
| Júbilo Iwata | 2023 | 0 | 0 | 0 | 0 | 0 | 0 | — | | 0 | 0 |
| Júbilo Iwata | Total | 145 | 18 | 3 | 1 | 3 | 0 | 0 | 0 | 148 | 19 |
| Career total | | 340 | 53 | 14 | 3 | 20 | 3 | 1 | 0 | 375 | 59 |

^{1}Includes Suruga Bank Championship.

== National team statistics ==
Japan national team
| Year | Apps | Goals |
|---|---|---|
| 2013 | 2 | 0 |
| Total | 2 | 0 |

== Honours ==
=== Club ===
Júbilo Iwata

- Suruga Bank Championship (1) : 2011
- J2 League : 2021

=== Japan ===
- EAFF East Asian Cup (1) : 2013
