= Kosuke Yamamoto =

Japanese footballer

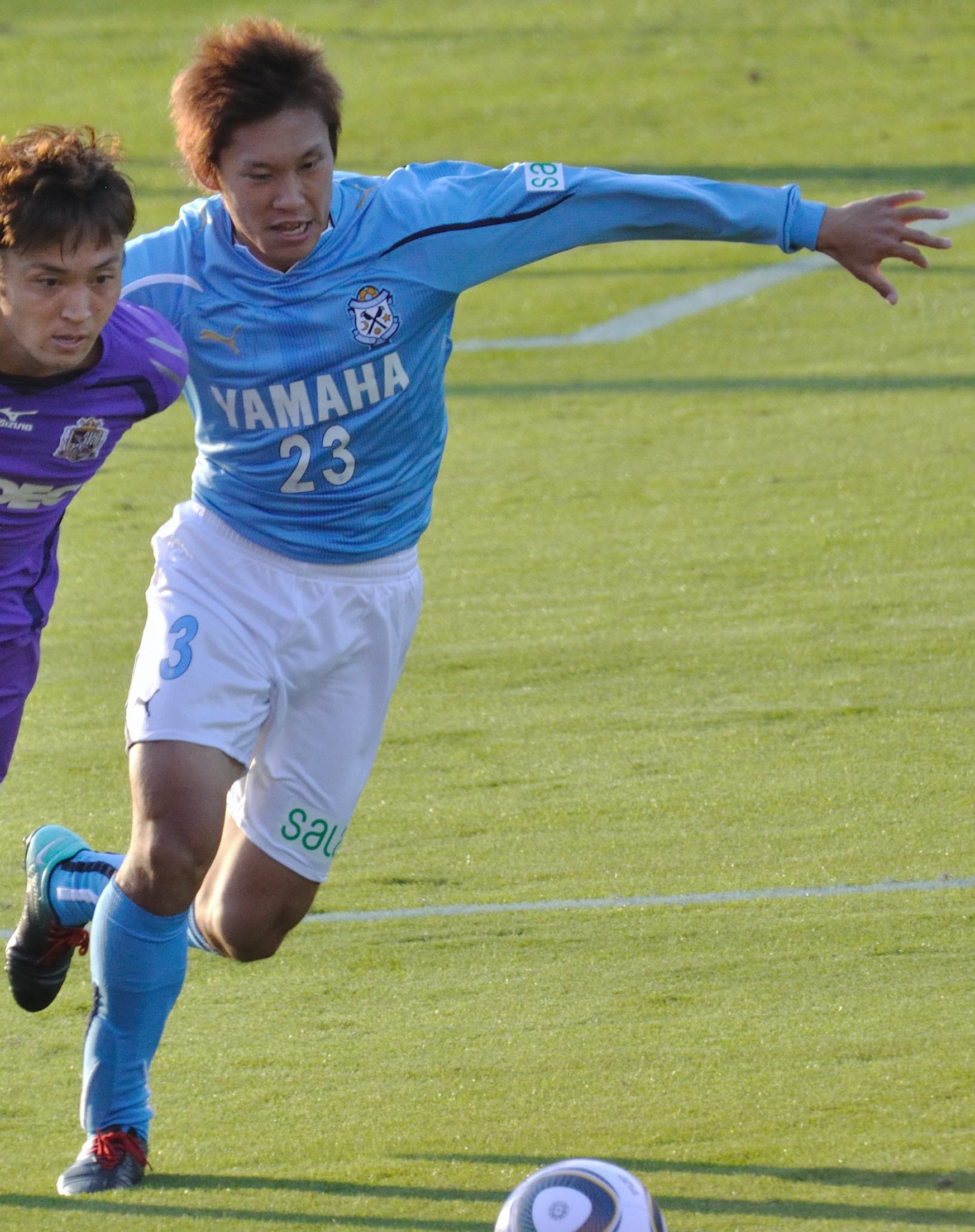
- Yamamoto playing for Júbilo in 2010

Personal information
- Full name: Kosuke Yamamoto
- Date of birth: 29 October 1989 (age 37)
- Place of birth: Hamamatsu, Japan
- Height: 1.79 m (5 ft 10 in)
- Position: Defensive midfielder

Team information
- Current team: Matsumoto Yamaga FC
- Number: 15

Youth career
- Seirei JFC
- 2002–2007: Júbilo Iwata

Senior career*
Years	Team	Apps	(Gls)
2006–2023	Júbilo Iwata	414	(27)
2014–2015	→ Albirex Niigata (loan)	61	(12)
2024-	Matsumoto Yamaga FC	67	(2)

International career
2007–2009	Japan U19	6	(2)
2010	Japan U22	3	(0)
Medal record
Júbilo Iwata
Winner	J.League Cup	2010
- * Club domestic league appearances and goals as of 1 January 2026

Kosuke Yamamoto (山本 康裕, Yamamoto Kōsuke; born 29 October 1989) is a Japanese footballer who plays for Matsumoto Yamaga FC. Mainly as a defensive midfielder.

== Career ==
=== Júbilo Iwata ===
Yamamoto, who was born in Hamamatsu, Shizuoka Prefecture, started his career at Seirei Junior Football Club before transferring to Júbilo Iwata's youth academy in 2002. He won himself a contract and was promoted to the senior squad at the end of the 2007 season after progressing through the youth ranks at the club and completing his two-year apprenticeship. He made his first team debut for the Júbilo in the J1 League match on 3 September 2006, when he came on as a late substitute for Robert Cullen in the 3–2 defeat to Oita Trinita at Ōita Bank Dome.

=== Albirex Niigata ===
On 16 June 2014, Yamamoto completed a move to Albirex Niigata on loan thus being reunited with former coach Masaaki Yanagishita. He made his Albirex debut on 19 July, starting against Urawa Red Diamonds, before being substituted by Sho Naruoka in the 84th minute. He scored his first goal for Albirex in a 3–0 win over Kawasaki Frontale at Big Swan on 5 October 2014. Yamamoto's second league goal for Albirex came in a 3–1 win over FC Tokyo at Ajinomoto Stadium on 22 November, scoring the winning goal for the away side. Following a successful debut campaign, Yamamoto agreed to a second season on loan at Albirex Niigata.

=== Return to Júbilo ===
After a two years-loan and some good displays with Albirex, Júbilo took back Yamamoto for 2016 season.

== Career statistics ==
=== Club ===
Updated to 19 February 2019.

Club	Season	League		Cup		League Cup		AFC		Other^{1}		Total	
Club	Season	Apps	Goals	Apps	Goals	Apps	Goals	Apps	Goals	Apps	Goals	Apps	Goals
Júbilo Iwata	2006	1	0	0	0	0	0	-		-		1	0
Júbilo Iwata	2007	3	0	0	0	3	0	-		-		6	0
Júbilo Iwata	2008	9	0	0	0	1	0	-		-		10	0
Júbilo Iwata	2009	26	0	2	0	3	0	-		-		31	0
Júbilo Iwata	2010	30	1	3	1	10	0	-		-		43	2
Júbilo Iwata	2011	23	2	2	0	3	0	-		1	0	29	2
Júbilo Iwata	2012	23	7	2	1	6	0	-		-		31	8
Júbilo Iwata	2013	27	1	2	3	4	1	-		-		33	5
Júbilo Iwata	2014	1	0	-		-		-		-		1	0
Albirex Niigata	2014	20	2	0	0	0	0	-		-		20	2
Albirex Niigata	2015	33	7	0	0	8	3	-		-		41	10
Júbilo Iwata	2016	29	0	3	0	3	0	-		-		35	0
Júbilo Iwata	2017	5	0	0	0	3	0	-		-		8	0
Júbilo Iwata	2018	15	0	4	0	5	1	-		-		24	1
Career total		245	20	18	5	49	5	-		1	0	313	30

^{1}Includes Suruga Bank Championship.
