= Takeaki Harigaya =

Japanese footballer

Takeaki Harigaya 針谷 岳晃
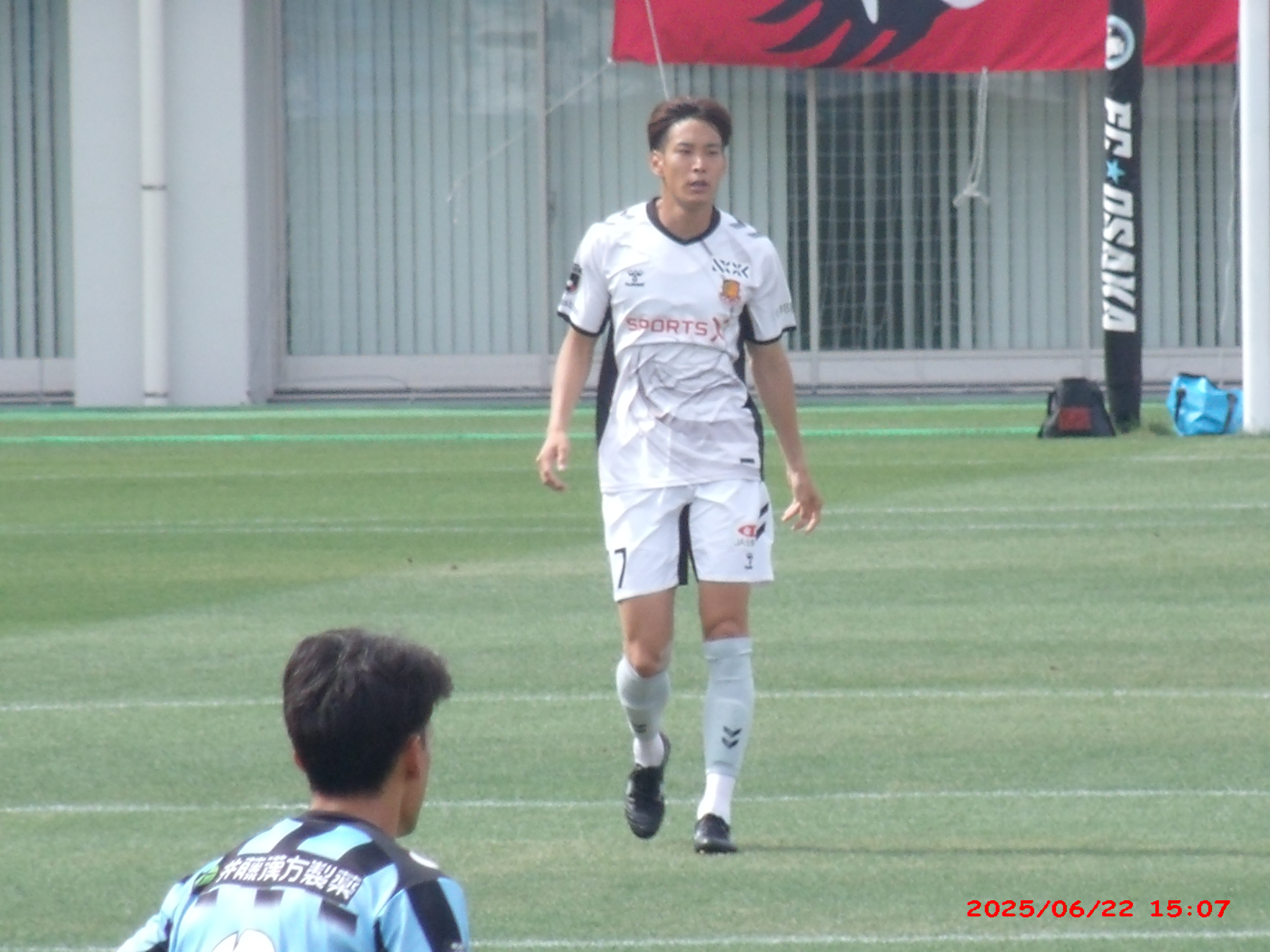

Personal information
- Full name: Takeaki Harigaya
- Date of birth: October 15, 1998 (age 28)
- Place of birth: Kuki, Japan
- Height: 1.66 m (5 ft 5 1/2 in)
- Position: Midfielder

Team information
- Current team: Fukushima United FC
- Number: 10

Youth career
- 2014–2016: Shohei High School

Senior career*
Years	Team	Apps	(Gls)
2017–2022	Júbilo Iwata	18	(0)
2020–2022	→ Giravanz Kitakyushu (loan)	68	(0)
2023–	Fukushima United FC	94	(2)
- * Club domestic league appearances and goals as of 25 August 2026

Takeaki Harigaya (針谷 岳晃, Harigaya Takeaki; born October 15, 1998) is a Japanese football player who currently plays for Fukushima United FC.

== Career ==
Takeaki Harigaya joined J1 League club Júbilo Iwata in 2017. He made his league debut for Jubilo against Kawasaki Frontale on the 30 June 2019.

Takeaki made his league debut for Giravanz against Zweigen Kanazawa on the 1 November 2020.

== Club statistics ==
Updated to 22 February 2020.

Appearances and goals by club, season and competition
Club	Season	League			Emperor's Cup		J. League Cup		Total	
Club	Season	Division	Apps	Goals	Apps	Goals	Apps	Goals	Apps	Goals
Júbilo Iwata	2017	J1 League	0	0	3	0	3	0	6	0
Júbilo Iwata	2018	J1 League	0	0	0	0	1	0	1	0
Júbilo Iwata	2019	J1 League	3	0	1	0	6	0	10	0
Total			3	0	4	0	10	0	17	0
