= Rikiya Uehara =

Japanese footballer

Rikiya Uehara 上原 力也
Personal information
- Full name: Rikiya Uehara
- Date of birth: August 25, 1996 (age 30)
- Place of birth: Itō, Japan
- Height: 1.74 m (5 ft 8 1/2 in)
- Position: Defensive midfielder

Team information
- Current team: Júbilo Iwata
- Number: 7

Youth career
- Mare FC
- ACN Jubilo Numazu
- 2011–2014: Júbilo Iwata

Senior career*
| Years | Team | Apps | (Gls) |
| 2015– | Júbilo Iwata | 239 | (15) |
| 2015 | → J. League U-22 (loan) | 6 | (0) |
| 2021 | → Vegalta Sendai (loan) | 34 | (1) |
- * Club domestic league appearances and goals as of 14 August 2026

Rikiya Uehara (上原 力也, Uehara Rikiya; born August 25, 1996 in Shizuoka) is a Japanese professional footballer who plays as a defensive midfielder for J2 League club Júbilo Iwata.

== Club statistics ==
As of match played 24 April 2022

Appearances and goals by club, season and competition
| Club | Season | League | | | National cup | | League cup | | Other | | Total | |
| Club | Season | Division | Apps | Goals | Apps | Goals | Apps | Goals | Apps | Goals | Apps | Goals |
| Japan | | | League | | Emperor's Cup | | J. League Cup | | Other | | Total | |
|---|---|---|---|---|---|---|---|---|---|---|---|---|
| Júbilo Iwata | 2016 | J1 League | 1 | 0 | 2 | 0 | 2 | 0 | – | | 5 | 0 |
| Júbilo Iwata | 2017 | J1 League | 6 | 0 | 3 | 0 | 2 | 1 | – | | 11 | 1 |
| Júbilo Iwata | 2018 | J1 League | 28 | 1 | 4 | 1 | 6 | 0 | 1 (Note: J1/J2 Play-offs) | 0 | 39 | 2 |
| Júbilo Iwata | 2019 | J1 League | 22 | 2 | 3 | 0 | 5 | 1 | – | | 30 | 3 |
| Júbilo Iwata | 2020 | J2 League | 38 | 2 | – | | 0 | 0 | – | | 38 | 2 |
| Júbilo Iwata | 2022 | J1 League | 5 | 0 | 0 | 0 | 4 | 0 | – | | 9 | 0 |
| Júbilo Iwata | Total | | 100 | 5 | 12 | 1 | 19 | 2 | 1 | 0 | 132 | 8 |
| J.League U-22 Selection (loan) | 2015 | J3 League | 6 | 0 | 0 | 0 | – | | – | | 6 | 0 |
| Vegalta Sendai (loan) | 2021 | J1 League | 34 | 1 | 1 | 0 | 4 | 0 | 0 | 0 | 39 | 1 |
| Career total | | | 140 | 6 | 13 | 1 | 23 | 2 | 1 | 0 | 177 | 9 |
