= Ryuki Miura =

Japanese footballer

Ryuki Miura 三浦 龍輝
Personal information
- Full name: Ryuki Miura
- Date of birth: 17 May 1992 (age 34)
- Place of birth: Machida, Tokyo, Japan
- Height: 1.81 m (5 ft 11 in)
- Position: Goalkeeper

Team information
- Current team: Júbilo Iwata
- Number: 21

Youth career
- 1999–2007: Machida JFC
- 2008–2010: FC Tokyo

College career
Years	Team	Apps	(Gls)
2011–2014	Meiji University		

Senior career*
Years	Team	Apps	(Gls)
2015	Kashiwa Reysol	0	(0)
2016	Nagano Parceiro	15	(0)
2017–	Júbilo Iwata	111	(0)
- * Club domestic league appearances and goals as of 14 August 2026

Ryuki Miura (三浦 龍輝, Miura, Ryuki; born 17 May 1992 in Machida, Tokyo) is a Japanese footballer who plays for Júbilo Iwata.

== Career statistics ==
Updated to 8 August 2022.

Appearances and goals by club, season and competition
Club	Season	League			Emperor's Cup		J.League Cup		Asia		Total	
Club	Season	Division	Apps	Goals	Apps	Goals	Apps	Goals	Apps	Goals	Apps	Goals
Kashiwa Reysol	2015	J1 League	0	0	0	0	0	0	0	0	0	0
Nagano Parceiro	2016	J3 League	15	0	2	0	–		–		17	0
Júbilo Iwata	2017	J1 League	0	0	4	0	0	0	–		4	0
Júbilo Iwata	2018	J1 League	2	0	3	0	4	0	–		9	0
Júbilo Iwata	2019	J1 League	0	0	1	0	5	0	–		6	0
Júbilo Iwata	2020	J2 League	0	0	–		–		–		0	0
Júbilo Iwata	2021	J2 League	37	0	0	0	–		–		37	0
Júbilo Iwata	2022	J1 League	19	0	0	0	0	0	–		19	0
Career total			73	0	10	0	9	0	0	0	92	0
