= Daiki Ogawa =

Japanese footballer (born 1991)

Daiki Ogawa 小川 大貴
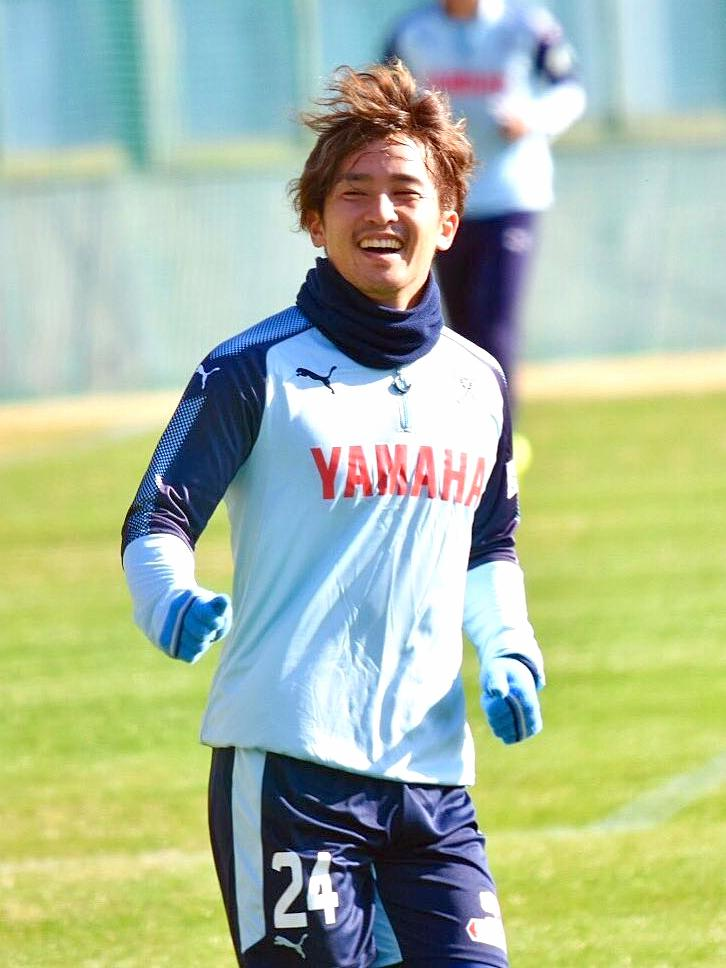
- Ogawa in 2020

Personal information
- Full name: Daiki Ogawa
- Date of birth: 16 October 1991 (age 35)
- Place of birth: Fuji, Shizuoka, Japan
- Height: 1.72 m (5 ft 8 in)
- Position: Right back

Team information
- Current team: Matsumoto Yamaga FC
- Number: 24

Youth career
- Motoyoshiwara Ases
- 2004–2006: ACN Júbilo Numazu
- 2007–2009: Júbilo Iwata

College career
Years	Team	Apps	(Gls)
2010–2013	Meiji University		

Senior career*
Years	Team	Apps	(Gls)
2014–2024	Júbilo Iwata	194	(5)
2024	JEF United Chiba (loan)	13	(0)
2025–	Matsumoto Yamaga FC	31	(0)
- * Club domestic league appearances and goals as of 1 January 2026

Daiki Ogawa (小川 大貴, Ogawa Daiki; 16 October 1991) is a Japanese footballer who plays for Matsumoto Yamaga FC.

== Club statistics ==
Updated to 8 August 2022.

Club performance			League		Cup		League Cup		Total	
Season	Club	League	Apps	Goals	Apps	Goals	Apps	Goals	Apps	Goals
Japan			League		Emperor's Cup		League Cup		Total	
2014	Júbilo Iwata	J2 League	4	0	0	0	–		4	0
2015	Júbilo Iwata	J2 League	2	0	2	0	–		4	0
2016	Júbilo Iwata	J1 League	7	0	0	0	4	0	11	0
2017	Júbilo Iwata	J1 League	20	0	2	1	5	0	27	1
2018	Júbilo Iwata	J1 League	21	1	3	0	6	0	30	1
2019	Júbilo Iwata	J1 League	29	0	2	0	1	0	32	0
2020	Júbilo Iwata	J2 League	41	1	–		0	0	41	1
2021	Júbilo Iwata	J2 League	25	3	2	0	–		27	3
2022	Júbilo Iwata	J1 League	19	0	2	0	4	0	25	0
Career total			168	5	13	1	20	0	201	6
