= Kentaro Oi =

Japanese footballer (born 1984)

Kentaro Oi 大井 健太郎
Personal information
- Full name: Kentaro Oi
- Date of birth: May 14, 1984 (age 42)
- Place of birth: Fujieda, Shizuoka, Japan
- Height: 1.81 m (5 ft 11 1/2 in)
- Position: Centre back

Team information
- Current team: Eastern Lions

Youth career
- 2000–2002: Fujieda Higashi High School

Senior career*
Years	Team	Apps	(Gls)
2003–2010	Júbilo Iwata	84	(2)
2011	Shonan Bellmare	36	(2)
2012–2015	Albirex Niigata	107	(5)
2016–2023	Júbilo Iwata	198	(15)
2023–	Eastern Lions	49	(3)

International career
2001	Japan U-17	3	(0)
Medal record
Júbilo Iwata
Runner-up	J1 League	2003
Winner	J.League Cup	2010
Winner	Emperor's Cup	2003
Runner-up	Emperor's Cup	2004
Representing Japan
AFC U-19 Championship
Silver medal – second place	2002 Qatar
- * Club domestic league appearances and goals as of 16 February 2023

Kentaro Oi (大井 健太郎, Ōi Kentarō; born May 14, 1984) is a Japanese football player who plays for Eastern Lions.

== Club career ==
After graduation from Fujieda Higashi High School in 2003, Oi signed with the local club, Júbilo Iwata. He made his professional debut on 16 July 2003 in the J.League Cup match against Tokyo Verdy. His first league start at Kobe Wing Stadium in the 2–1 defeat to Vissel Kobe on 26 September 2004. He was a first team regular in the 2007 season, appearing in 26 games. In 2011, Oi joined Shonan Bellmare on a one-year loan. He made 36 league appearances for Bellmare, scoring 2 goals. At the end of his loan at Bellmare, he turned down the opportunity to sign a new contract with Jubilo Iwata.

On 7 January 2011, Oi completed a permanent move to Albirex Niigata.

== National team career ==
Oi was a member of the Japan U-17 national team for the 2001 U-17 World Championship. Oi played 3 games in the competition but the team was eliminated after the group stage.

== Club statistics ==
Updated to 8 August 2022.

Club performance			League		Emperor's Cup		J. League Cup		Asia		Total	
Season	Club	League	Apps	Goals	Apps	Goals	Apps	Goals	Apps	Goals	Apps	Goals
2003	Júbilo Iwata	J1 League	0	0	0	0	1	0	–		1	0
2004	Júbilo Iwata	J1 League	3	0	0	0	0	0	2	0	5	0
2005	Júbilo Iwata	J1 League	4	0	1	0	1	0	2	0	8	0
2006	Júbilo Iwata	J1 League	8	0	3	0	5	0	–		16	0
2007	Júbilo Iwata	J1 League	26	1	0	0	4	0	–		30	1
2008	Júbilo Iwata	J1 League	11	1	2	0	0	0	–		13	1
2009	Júbilo Iwata	J1 League	17	0	0	0	4	0	–		21	0
2010	Júbilo Iwata	J1 League	15	0	2	0	4	1	–		21	1
2011	Shonan Bellmare	J2 League	36	2	1	1	–		–		37	3
2012	Albirex Niigata	J1 League	14	0	2	0	4	0	–		20	0
2013	Albirex Niigata	J1 League	33	2	1	0	1	0	–		35	2
2014	Albirex Niigata	J1 League	33	1	2	0	4	0	–		39	1
2015	Albirex Niigata	J1 League	27	2	0	0	9	0	–		36	2
2016	Júbilo Iwata	J1 League	30	1	0	0	2	0	–		32	1
2017	Júbilo Iwata	J1 League	32	5	0	0	0	0	–		32	5
2018	Júbilo Iwata	J1 League	34	3	2	1	1	0	–		37	4
2019	Júbilo Iwata	J1 League	18	1	0	0	0	0	–		18	1
2020	Júbilo Iwata	J2 League	25	3	–		0	0	–		25	3
2021	Júbilo Iwata	J2 League	38	2	0	0	–		–		38	2
2022	Júbilo Iwata	J1 League	15	0	2	0	2	0	–		19	0
Career total			419	24	18	2	42	1	4	0	483	21
