= Kotaro Fujikawa =

Japanese footballer (born 1998)

Kotaro Fujikawa 藤川 虎太朗
Personal information
- Full name: Kotaro Fujikawa
- Date of birth: July 24, 1998 (age 28)
- Place of birth: Fukuoka, Japan
- Height: 1.71 m (5 ft 7 1/2 in)
- Positions: Attacking midfielder; winger

Team information
- Current team: Nagano Parceiro
- Number: 28

Youth career
- –2010: FC Alloro
- 2011–2013: Sagan Tosu
- 2014–2016: Higashi Fukuoka High School

Senior career*
Years	Team	Apps	(Gls)
2017–2024	Júbilo Iwata	80	(6)
2021	→ Roasso Kumamoto (loan)	1	(0)
2022	→ Giravanz Kitakyushu (loan)	29	(5)
2025–	Nagano Parceiro	51	(6)
- * Club domestic league appearances and goals as of 17 August 2026

Kotaro Fujikawa (藤川 虎太朗, Fujikawa Kotaro; born July 24, 1998) is a Japanese football player who currently plays for Nagano Parceiro.

== Career ==
Kotaro Fujikawa joined J1 League club Júbilo Iwata in 2017.

== Career statistics ==
Updated to 22 February 2019.

Appearances and goals by club, season and competition
Club	Season	League			Emperor's Cup		J.League Cup		Total	
Club	Season	Division	Apps	Goals	Apps	Goals	Apps	Goals	Apps	Goals
Júbilo Iwata	2017	J1 League	0	0	1	0	1	0	2	0
Júbilo Iwata	2018	J1 League	0	0	2	1	1	0	3	1
Career total			0	0	3	1	2	0	5	1
