= 2022 Emperor's Cup =

Tournament details
- Country: Japan
- Dates: 21 May – 16 October
- Teams: 88

Final positions
- Champions: Ventforet Kofu (1st title)
- Runners-up: Sanfrecce Hiroshima
- Champions League: Ventforet Kofu

The 2022 Emperor's Cup (Emperor's Cup JFA 102nd Japan Football Championship (Japanese: 天皇杯 JFA 第102回全日本サッカー選手権大会)) was the 102nd edition of the annually contested cup, taking place from 21 May to 16 October. The final was played at the Nissan Stadium, in Yokohama, Kanagawa. The stadium returned to host an Emperor's Cup final for the first time since 2014.

The 2022 Emperor's Cup followed a different pattern to the previous three editions of the tournament, being restored to its old, usual format, which was applied for the last time in the 2018 Emperor's Cup. It features 88 teams, representing the prefectural football associations, the J1 League, and the J2 League. Honda FC was awarded a seeded entry as the JFA's annually specially designated amateur club, in order to turn the quantity of teams in the First Round to an even number.

Urawa Red Diamonds were the defending champions, but were eliminated by Thespakusatsu Gunma in the third round. Ventforet Kofu won their first major title over Sanfrecce Hiroshima and qualified for the 2023–24 AFC Champions League group stage.

== Qualifying rounds ==
As only J1 and J2 League clubs qualify directly for the First Round, the other Emperor's Cup candidate teams (exception being made to the JFA-seeded teams), have to undergo a prefectural qualification, with regulaments and schedules varying from one association to another. In total, there are 47 prefectural cup qualifications, with the winners of each prefectural cup earning their right to play in the First Round of the Emperor's Cup. This year, a total of 2,342 teams played in the aforementioned prefectural qualifications. The following boxes shows each result of the 47 prefectural finals of the 2022 Emperor's Cup Prefectural Qualification Cup.

17 April 2022 Akita Final	Akita FC Cambiare	0−3	North Asia University	Akita
13:30 JST		Report		Stadium: Space Project Dream Field

24 April 2022 Yamaguchi Final	FC Baleine Shimonoseki	0−1	Shunan University	Shimonoseki
10:30 JST		Report		Stadium: Nogihama Park

24 April 2022 Fukuoka Final	Giravanz Kitakyushu	0−0 (a.e.t.) (4−2 p)	Fukuoka University	Fukuoka
13:00 JST		Report		Stadium: Best Denki Stadium

24 April 2022 Hiroshima Final	Fukuyama City FC	2−1	SRC Hiroshima	Hiroshima
13:00 JST		Report		Stadium: EDION Stadium Hiroshima

24 April 2022 Shimane Final	FC Kagura Shimane	3−0	Belugarosso Hamada	Masuda
13:00 JST		Report		Stadium: Shimane Prefectural Soccer Field

24 April 2022 Tottori Final	Gainare Tottori	5−0	Yonago Genki	Tottori
13:00 JST		Report		Stadium: Axis Bird Stadium

24 April 2022 Okayama Final	Mitsubishi Mizushima	1−2	International Pacific University	Okayama
13:30 JST		Report		Stadium: City Light Stadium

24 April 2022 Tokushima Final	Yellow Monkeys	0−5	FC Tokushima	Naruto
14:00 JST		Report		Stadium: Pocarisweat Stadium

1 May 2022 Yamagata Final	Nagai Club	2−0	Yamagata University	Tendō
11:00 JST		Report		Stadium: ND Soft Stadium Yamagata

5 May 2022 Wakayama Final	Wakayama Kihoku Shukyudan	0−2	Arterivo Wakayama	Wakayama
13:00 JST		Report		Stadium: Kimiidera Athletic Stadium

7 May 2022 Chiba Final	Juntendo University	0−2	Briobecca Urayasu	Narashino
13:00 JST		Report		Stadium: Daiichi Cutter Field

7 May 2022 Gifu Final	FC Gifu	5−0	Gifu Kyoritsu University	Gifu
13:00 JST		Report		Stadium: Gifu Nagaragawa Stadium

7 May 2022 Hyogo Final	Cento Cuore Harima	2−0	FC.AWJ	Sumoto
14:00 JST		Report		Stadium: ASPA Goshikidai Sports Park

7 May 2022 Kumamoto Final	Kumamoto Gakuen University	1−1 (a.e.t.) (2−4 p)	FCK Marry Gold Kumamoto	Kumamoto
14:00 JST		Report		Stadium: Kumamoto Suizenji Stadium

7 May 2022 Kyoto Final	Doshisha University	2−1	Kyoto Sangyo University	Kyoto
13:00 JST		Report		Stadium: Takebishi Stadium Kyoto

7 May 2022 Nagasaki Final	MD Nagasaki	1−0	Mitsubishi Nagasaki SC	Nagasaki
13:00 JST		Report		Stadium: Transcosmos Stadium Nagasaki

7 May 2022 Osaka Final	FC Osaka	0−2	Kansai University	Sakai
14:00 JST		Report		Stadium: J-GREEN Sakai

7 May 2022 Saitama Final	Tokyo International University FC	1−0	Tokyo International University	Saitama
13:00 JST		Report		Stadium: SFA Football Center

7 May 2022 Shiga Final	Biwako Seikei Sport College	1−1 (a.e.t.) (1−4 p)	MIO Biwako Shiga	Higashiomi
13:00 JST		Report		Stadium: Nunobiki Sports Park

8 May 2022 Aichi Final	Maruyasu Okazaki	1−2	Chukyo University	Nagoya
13:00 JST		Report		Stadium: Nagoya Minato Stadium

8 May 2022 Aomori Final	ReinMeer Aomori	0−1	Vanraure Hachinohe	Hachinohe
13:00 JST		Report		Stadium: Prifoods Stadium

8 May 2022 Ehime Final	Ehime FC	cancelled	FC Imabari	Matsuyama
13:00 JST		Report		Stadium: Ningineer Stadium

8 May 2022 Fukui Final	Fukui United	7−1	Sakai Phoenix	Sakai
13:00 JST		Report		Stadium: Technoport Fukui Stadium

8 May 2022 Fukushima Final	Iwaki FC	0−1	Fukushima United	Fukushima
13:00 JST		Report		Stadium: Toho Stadium

8 May 2022 Gunma Final	Tonan Maebashi	3−5	Jobu University	Maebashi
10:00 JST		Report		Stadium: Earth Care Gunma Shikishima Football Stadium

8 May 2022 Hokkaido Final	Hokkaido Tokachi Sky Earth	0−1	Sapporo University	Obihiro
13:00 JST		Report		Stadium: Obihiro Forest Sports Park

8 May 2022 Ibaraki Final	Ryutsu Keizai Dragons Ryugasaki	1−3 (a.e.t.)	University of Tsukuba	Hitachinaka
13:00 JST		Report		Stadium: Hitachinaka City Stadium

8 May 2022 Ishikawa Final	Kanazawa Seiryo University	1−2	FC Hokuriku	Kanazawa
13:00 JST		Report		Stadium: Kanazawa Soccer Stadium

8 May 2022 Iwate Final	Morioka Zebra	0−3	Fuji University	Tōno
10:00 JST		Report		Stadium: Tono City National Athletic Soccer Field

8 May 2022 Kagawa Final	Kamatamare Sanuki	cancelled	Takamatsu University	Takamatsu
13:00 JST		Report		Stadium: Takamatsu City Eastern Sports Park

8 May 2022 Kagoshima Final	NIFS Kanoya	2−3 (a.e.t.)	Kagoshima United	Kagoshima
11:00 JST		Report		Stadium: Shiranami Stadium

9 May 2022 Kanagawa Final	SC Sagamihara	0−3	Toin University of Yokohama	Yokohama
13:00 JST		Report		Stadium: NHK Spring Mitsuzawa Football Stadium

8 May 2022 Kochi Final	Kochi United	2−0	KUFC Nankoku	Kōchi
13:00 JST		Report		Stadium: Kochi Haruno Athletic Stadium

8 May 2022 Mie Final	Suzuka Point Getters	0−0 (a.e.t.) (4−2 p)	Veertien Mie	Suzuka
13:00 JST		Report		Stadium: Mie Suzuka Sports Garden

8 May 2022 Miyagi Final	Sony Sendai	3−0	Sendai University	Rifu
13:00 JST		Report		Stadium: Miyagi Co-op Megumino Soccer Field

8 May 2022 Miyazaki Final	Tegevajaro Miyazaki	1−2 (a.e.t.)	Honda Lock	Miyazaki
13:00 JST		Report		Stadium: Miyazaki City Ikimenomori Sports Park Athletics Stadium

8 May 2022 Nagano Final	Nagano Parceiro	0−1	Matsumoto Yamaga	Matsumoto
14:00 JST		Report		Stadium: Sunpro Alwin

8 May 2022 Nara Final	Nara Club	2−0	Tenri University	Kashihara
13:00 JST		Report		Stadium: Kashihara Park

8 May 2022 Niigata Final	Niigata University HW FC	0−4	Niigata University HW	Shibata
15:00 JST		Report		Stadium: Ijimino Park Athletics Stadium

8 May 2022 Oita Final	Verspah Oita	cancelled	J-Lease FC	Ōita
13:00 JST		Report		Stadium: Showa Denko Dome Oita

8 May 2022 Okinawa Final	Okinawa SV	1−1 (a.e.t.) (8−7 p)	Kaiho Bank	Nanjō
11:00 JST		Report		Stadium: Nanjō City Athletics Stadium

8 May 2022 Saga Final	Brew Kashima	2−0	Kawasoe Club	Tosu
11:00 JST		Report		Stadium: Ekimae Real Estate Stadium

8 May 2022 Shizuoka Final	Fujieda MYFC	1−0	Azul Claro Numazu	Shizuoka
13:00 JST		Report		Stadium: Kusanagi Athletic Stadium

8 May 2022 Tochigi Final	Tochigi City	3−3 (a.e.t.) (3−4 p)	Vertfee Yaita	Utsunomiya
13:00 JST		Report		Stadium: Tochigi Green Stadium

8 May 2022 Tokyo Final	Rissho University	1−0	Kokushikan University	Kita
14:00 JST		Report		Stadium: Ajinomoto Field Nishigaoka

8 May 2022 Toyama Final	Kataller Toyama	1−0 (a.e.t.)	Toyama Shinjo	Toyama
13:00 JST		Report		Stadium: Toyama Stadium

8 May 2022 Yamanashi Final	Route HFC	2−5	Yamanashi Gakuin University Pegasus	Kōfu
13:00 JST		Report		Stadium: JIT Recycle Ink Stadium

== Participating clubs ==
In parentheses: the amount of times each team qualified for the Emperor's Cup (appearance in the 2022 Emperor's Cup included)

2022 J1 League all clubs join in the second round	2022 J2 League all clubs join in the second round	Amateur Best Team join in the first round	47 prefectural tournament winners all clubs join in the first round	
Avispa Fukuoka (30); Cerezo Osaka (53); Consadole Sapporo (41); Gamba Osaka (42); Júbilo Iwata (45); Kashima Antlers (38); Kashiwa Reysol (54); Kawasaki Frontale (39); Kyoto Sanga FC (39); Nagoya Grampus (45); Sagan Tosu (30); Sanfrecce Hiroshima (70); Shimizu S-Pulse (30); Shonan Bellmare (50); FC Tokyo (28); Urawa Red Diamonds (57); Vissel Kobe (36); Yokohama F. Marinos (44)	Albirex Niigata (30); Blaublitz Akita (29); Fagiano Okayama (14); Iwate Grulla Morioka (15); JEF United Chiba (57); FC Machida Zelvia (10); Mito HollyHock (26); Montedio Yamagata (30); Omiya Ardija (27); Oita Trinita (26); Renofa Yamaguchi FC (18); Roasso Kumamoto (22); FC Ryukyu (14); Thespakusatsu Gunma (19); Tochigi SC (22); Tokushima Vortis (34); Tokyo Verdy (47); V-Varen Nagasaki (15); Vegalta Sendai (28); Ventforet Kofu (30); Yokohama FC (23); Zweigen Kanazawa (18)	Honda FC (42)	Hokkaido: Sapporo University (25); Aomori: Vanraure Hachinohe (10); Iwate: Fuji University (3); Miyagi: Sony Sendai (23); Akita: North Asia University (1); Yamagata: Nagai Club (1); Fukushima: Fukushima United (10); Ibaraki: University of Tsukuba (32); Tochigi: Vertfee Yaita (3); Gunma: Jobu University (1); Saitama: Tokyo International University FC (2); Chiba: Briobecca Urayasu (5); Tokyo: Rissho University (1); Kanagawa: Toin University of Yokohama (5); Yamanashi: Yamanashi Gakuin University Pegasus (5); Nagano: Matsumoto Yamaga (16); Niigata: Niigata University of Health and Welfare (6); Toyama: Kataller Toyama (13); Ishikawa: FC Hokuriku (5); Fukui: Fukui United (14); Shizuoka: Fujieda MYFC (4); Aichi: Chukyo University (7); Mie: Suzuka Point Getters (8); Gifu: FC Gifu (16)	Shiga: MIO Biwako Shiga (9); Kyoto: Doshisha University (10); Osaka: Kansai University (17); Hyōgo: Cento Cuore Harima (10); Nara: Nara Club (13); Wakayama: Arterivo Wakayama (14); Tottori: Gainare Tottori (24); Shimane: FC Kagura Shimane (8); Okayama: International Pacific University (3); Hiroshima: Fukuyama City (3); Yamaguchi: Shunan University (12); Kagawa: Takamatsu University (2); Tokushima: FC Tokushima (7); Ehime: FC Imabari (12); Kōchi: Kochi United (7); Fukuoka: Giravanz Kitakyushu (13); Saga: Brew Kashima (10); Nagasaki: MD Nagasaki (6); Kumamoto: FCK Marry Gold Kumamoto (1); Ōita: Verspah Oita (12); Miyazaki: Honda Lock (15); Kagoshima: Kagoshima United (8); Okinawa: Okinawa SV (4)

Note

1. The Prefectural Cup Final of Ehime, Oita, and Kagawa were cancelled, due to some players of one or both teams in their respective prefectural finals testing positive for the COVID-19 disease. As a result: FC Imabari won the Ehime Prefectural spot; Verspah Oita won the Oita Prefectural spot as J-Lease FC (their opponent) declined their participation in the final; And Takamatsu University won the Kagawa Prefectural spot as Kamatamare Sanuki withdrew from the final after the disease's outbreak in the squad.

== Calendar ==
The schedule was announced on 21 December 2021. The first round of the tournament was played on Saturdays and Mondays. From the second round to the semi-finals, the matches were played on Wednesdays, and the final on a Sunday. On a very rare occasion, the final was moved to be played on mid-October, due to Japan's participation at the 2022 FIFA World Cup, held at the end of the year.

Round	Date (backup date)	Matches	Clubs	New entries this round
First round	21–22 May (23 May)	24	48 (47+1) → 24	1 seeded amateur team (Honda FC); 47 prefectural qualification cup winners
Second round	1 June (8 June)	32	64 (24+18+22) → 32	18 2022 J1 League clubs; 22 2022 J2 League clubs
Third round	22 June (29 June)	16	32 → 16	
Fourth round	13 July (20 July)	8	16 → 8	
Quarter-finals	7 September (28 September)	4	8 → 4	
Semi-finals	5 October	2	4 → 2	
Final	16 October	1	2 → 1	

== Schedule ==
=== First round ===
The opening round of the 2022 Emperor's Cup with the 47 Prefectural Cup Final winners and a specially seeded amateur team (Honda FC) was played from 21 to 22 May, with 23 May being the alternative match-playing date, if the match needed by any reason to be rescheduled.

21 May 2022 Match 1	Sapporo University	1−0	Yamanashi Gakuin University Pegasus	Sapporo
13:00 JST	Ogasawara 36'	Report (JFA); Report (JFA)		Stadium: Sapporo Atsubetsu Stadium; Attendance: 298; Referee: Shingo Kuniyoshi

21 May 2022 Match 2	Vertfee Yaita	7−0	Nagai Club	Utsunomiya
13:00 JST	Seki 7'; Fujita 14', 32', 62'; Masubuchi 36'; Kamimura 40'; Tokoi 56'	Report (JFA); Report (JFA)		Stadium: Tochigi Green Stadium; Attendance: 269; Referee: Masaru Tezuka

21 May 2022 Match 3	Matsumoto Yamaga	3−2	FC Hokuriku	Matsumoto
13:00 JST	Tanaka 31', 60'; Enomoto 17'	Report (JFA); Report (JFA)	Endo 37'; Hirano 59'	Stadium: Sunpro Alwin; Attendance: 2,824; Referee: Yasuhiro Udagawa

21 May 2022 Match 4	FC Imabari	1−4	Okinawa SV	Matsuyama
12:00 JST	Nakagawa 45'	Report (JFA); Report (JFA)	Yamada 55', 68'; Gibo 60'; Anzai 63'	Stadium: Ningineer Stadium; Attendance: 516; Referee: Kenya Ohara

22 May 2022 Match 5	Jobu University	0−1	Fuji University	Maebashi
13:00 JST		Report (JFA); Report (JFA)	Chiba 71'	Stadium: Gunma Shikishima Football Stadium; Attendance: 438; Referee: Nozomi Nagata

22 May 2022 Match 6	Kagoshima United	3−1	Giravanz Kitakyushu	Kagoshima
13:00 JST	Nakahara 24'; Yamamoto 42'; Yonezawa 62'	Report (JFA); Report (JFA)	Nakayama 78'	Stadium: Shiranami Stadium; Attendance: 1,853; Referee: Tatsuya Sakai

22 May 2022 Match 7	Vanraure Hachinohe	0−1	Niigata University HW	Hachinohe
13:00 JST		Report (JFA); Report (JFA)	Nobiraki 17'	Stadium: Prifoods Stadium; Attendance: 554; Referee: Ken Tsukahara

21 May 2022 Match 8	FC Gifu	3−2	Chukyo University	Gifu
13:00 JST	Ishizu 39', 75'; Fujioka 84'	Report (JFA); Report (JFA)	Udo 15'; Kozakai 66'	Stadium: Gifu Memorial Center; Attendance: 902; Referee: Yoshihito Hori

22 May 2022 Match 9	MD Nagasaki	1−2	FC Kagura Shimane	Nagasaki
13:00 JST	Ueno 90+2'	Report (JFA); Report (JFA)	Baba 15'; Kawanaka 43'	Stadium: Nagasaki City Kakidomari Stadium; Attendance: 255; Referee: Yasuyuki Matsumoto

22 May 2022 Match 10	Fukui United	0−1	Doshisha University	Sakai
13:00 JST		Report (JFA); Report (JFA)	Nagasaka 66'	Stadium: Technoport Fukui Stadium; Attendance: 535; Referee: Takamasa Funahashi

21 May 2022 Match 11	Arterivo Wakayama	2−4	Kansai University	Wakayama
13:00 JST	Kubo 30'; Taguchi 39'	Report (JFA); Report (JFA)	Hyakuda 11', 67'; Matsuo 35'; Kunori 87'	Stadium: Kimiidera Athletic Stadium; Attendance: 393; Referee: Kiminori Yasukawa

22 May 2022 Match 12	Nara Club	0−1 (a.e.t.)	Honda FC	Nara
13:00 JST		Report (JFA); Report (JFA)	Okazaki 120+2'	Stadium: Rohto Field Nara; Attendance: 404; Referee: Yuichi Hanakawa

22 May 2022 Match 13	Suzuka Point Getters	3−0	Cento Cuore Harima	Suzuka
13:00 JST	Miyake 56'; Suemasa 59' (o.g.); Kitano 70'	Report (JFA); Report (JFA)		Stadium: Mie Suzuka Sports Garden; Attendance: 1,083; Referee: Hiroki Tani

22 May 2022 Match 14	Takamatsu University	0−3	Shunan University	Marugame, Kagawa
15:00 JST		Report (JFA); Report (JFA)	Terasaka 34'; Matsumoto 41'; Yamamoto 63'	Stadium: Pikara Stadium; Attendance: 288; Referee: Kenji Wakamiya

22 May 2022 Match 15	Brew Kashima	0−2	Kochi United	Tosu
13:00 JST		Report (JFA); Report (JFA)	Yamada 59'; Nishimura 87'	Stadium: Ekimae Real Estate Stadium; Attendance: 439; Referee: Takuya Yokoyama

22 May 2022 Match 16	Gainare Tottori	0−4	Verspah Oita	Tottori
13:00 JST		Report (JFA); Report (JFA)	Tone 30'; Tabuuchi 42', 66'; Fujimoto 70'	Stadium: Axis Bird Stadium; Attendance: 434; Referee: Kazuyoshi Karashima

22 May 2022 Match 17	Toin University of Yokohama	1−0	Rissho University	Hiratsuka
13:00 JST	Yamada 47'	Report (JFA); Report (JFA)		Stadium: Lemon Gas Stadium Hiratsuka; Attendance: 466; Referee: Takahito Seta

22 May 2022 Match 18	MIO Biwako Shiga	1−2 (a.e.t.)	International Pacific University	Higashiōmi
13:00 JST	Akiyama 43'	Report (JFA); Report (JFA)	Matsukubo 9'; Taguchi 111'	Stadium: Nunobiki Green Stadium; Attendance: 159; Referee: Ryuhei Yamaguchi

22 May 2022 Match 19	Kataller Toyama	1−0	Fujieda MYFC	Takaoka
13:00 JST	Yoshihira 17'	Report (JFA); Report (JFA)		Stadium: Takaoka Sports Core; Attendance: 1,169; Referee: Toshiki Tomomasa

22 May 2022 Match 20	University of Tsukuba	2−2 (a.e.t.) (5−3 p)	Briobecca Urayasu	Hitachinaka
13:00 JST	Sumi 18'; Wada 115'	Report (JFA); Report (JFA)	Hayashida 75' (o.g.); Inoue 101'	Stadium: Hitachinaka City Stadium; Attendance: 555; Referee: Yuki Murata
	Penalties
	Wada (penalty scored); Okita (penalty scored); Takeuchi (penalty scored); Kurihara (penalty scored); Shoji (penalty scored)		Hashimoto (penalty scored); Ito (penalty scored); Taniguchi (penalty scored); Saitai (penalty missed)

22 May 2022 Match 21	Fukuyama City	3−2	FC Tokushima	Hiroshima
13:00 JST	Soga 18'; Hamaguchi 54'; Komatsu 86'	Report (JFA); Report (JFA)	Sunomata 41'; Takahata 89'	Stadium: EDION Stadium Hiroshima; Attendance: 609; Referee: Shiro Hori

21 May 2022 Match 22	Fukushima United	7−1	North Asia University	Fukushima
13:00 JST	Takabatake 1', 45+3', 64'; Nagano 20', 38' (pen.), 45'; Mori 86'	Report (JFA); Report (JFA)	Uchigaki 9'	Stadium: Toho Stadium; Attendance: 546; Referee: Yuki Tanabe

21 May 2022 Match 23	Honda Lock	3−0	FCK Marry Gold Kumamoto	Shintomi
13:00 JST	Hasegawa 20', 50'; Fujiyama 51'	Report (JFA); Report (JFA)		Stadium: Unilever Stadium Shintomi; Attendance: 239; Referee: Koji Takahashi

21 May 2022 Match 24	Sony Sendai	3−1	Tokyo International University FC	Rifu
13:00 JST	Uchino 9', 76'; Akimoto 11'	Report (JFA); Report (JFA)	Kojima 90'	Stadium: Coop Miyagi Megumino Soccer Field A Attendance: 202; Referee: Masashi Harada

=== Second round ===
The matches on this round were played from 1 June to 8 June; 29 matches were played on 1 June and 3 matches on 8 June. Despite it being a professional league, the J3 League teams were not awarded a direct spot in this round, meaning that they had to undergo a prefectural qualification and win their first round matches to qualify for the second round. The direct spots were reserved to J1 League, and J2 League teams.

1 June 2022 Match 25	Kawasaki Frontale	5−0	Sapporo University	Kawasaki
18:00 JST	Kozuka 13'; Schmidt 16'; Chinen 20'; Seko 26'; Einaga 65'	Report (JFA); Report (JFA)		Stadium: Kawasaki Todoroki Stadium; Attendance: 4,667; Referee: Shu Kawamata

1 June 2022 Match 26	Tokyo Verdy	2−1	Blaublitz Akita	Chōfu
19:00 JST	Sato 7'; Nduka 31'	Report (JFA); Report (JFA)	Kogure 1'	Stadium: Ajinomoto Stadium; Attendance: 1,053; Referee: Yoshikazu Matsuzawa

1 June 2022 Match 27	Shonan Bellmare	3−0	Vertfee Yaita	Hiratsuka
18:00 JST	Segawa 32'; Nagaki 60'; Suzuki 82'	Report (JFA); Report (JFA)		Stadium: Lemon Gas Stadium Hiratsuka; Attendance: 1,276; Referee: Hiroyoshi Takayama

1 June 2022 Match 28	Júbilo Iwata	5−2	Matsumoto Yamaga	Iwata
19:00 JST	Seita 9'; Kurokawa 14'; Kanuma 52'; Yoshinaga 55'; Furukawa 68'	Report (JFA); Report (JFA)	Tanaka 4'; Komatsu 82'	Stadium: Yamaha Stadium; Attendance: 3,773; Referee: Toru Kakinuma

1 June 2022 Match 29	Avispa Fukuoka	3−0	Okinawa SV	Fukuoka
19:00 JST	Kanamori 40'; Kitajima 52'; Toya 71'	Report (JFA); Report (JFA)		Stadium: Best Denki Stadium; Attendance: 1,459; Referee: Tetsuro Yoshida

1 June 2022 Match 30	Machida Zelvia	1−3	Iwate Grulla Morioka	Machida
19:00 JST	Okano 24'	Report (JFA); Report (JFA)	Otabor 10'; Morelatto 41'; Wada 64'	Stadium: Machida GION Stadium; Attendance: 737; Referee: Hiromichi Oka

8 June 2022 Match 31	FC Tokyo	2−0	Fuji University	Chōfu
19:00 JST	Watanabe 36'; Adaílton 43' (pen.)	Report (JFA); Report (JFA)		Stadium: Ajinomoto Stadium; Attendance: 3,276; Referee: Kazuyoshi Enomoto

1 June 2022 Match 32	V-Varen Nagasaki	1−0	Kagoshima United	Isahaya
19:00 JST	Okuda 31'	Report (JFA); Report (JFA)		Stadium: Transcosmos Stadium Nagasaki; Attendance: 1,964; Referee: Reo Tanaka

1 June 2022 Match 33	Kashima Antlers	2−1	Niigata University HW	Kashima
19:00 JST	Someno 56'; Izumi 74'	Report (JFA); Report (JFA)	Komori 85'	Stadium: Kashima Soccer Stadium; Attendance: 2,670; Referee: Keigo Sendachi

1 June 2022 Match 34	FC Ryukyu	1−4	Omiya Ardija	Okinawa
19:00 JST	Omoto 57'	Report (JFA); Report (JFA)	Tomiyama 4'; Takeda 23', 84'; Kikuchi 38'	Stadium: Tapic Kenso Hiyagon Stadium; Attendance: 405; Referee: Takao Nishiyama

1 June 2022 Match 35	Gamba Osaka	4−2 (a.e.t.)	FC Gifu	Suita
19:00 JST	Wellington 21'; Okuno 47'; Patric 102'; Fujiharu 113'	Report (JFA); Report (JFA)	Togashi 8'; Murata 14'	Stadium: Panasonic Stadium Suita; Attendance: 3,035; Referee: Koichiro Fukushima

1 June 2022 Match 36	Oita Trinita	3−0	FC Kagura Shimane	Oita
19:00 JST	Umesaki 20'; Utsumoto 63'; Sato 76'	Report (JFA); Report (JFA)		Stadium: Showa Denko Dome Oita; Attendance: 1,587; Referee: Tomokazu Sato

1 June 2022 Match 37	Nagoya Grampus	2−0	Doshisha University	Nagoya
19:00 JST	Abe 47'; Mateus 88'	Report (JFA); Report (JFA)		Stadium: Paloma Mizuho Stadium; Attendance: 3,909; Referee: Yoshiro Imamura

1 June 2022 Match 38	JEF United Chiba	1−2	Zweigen Kanazawa	Chiba
19:00 JST	Sakuragawa 8'	Report (JFA); Report (JFA)	Toyoda 78', 90+5'	Stadium: Fukuda Denshi Arena; Attendance: 1,867; Referee: Koji Takasaki

1 June 2022 Match 39	Cerezo Osaka	3−1	Kansai University	Osaka
19:00 JST	Kato 21'; Bruno Mendes 33'; Funaki 36'	Report (JFA); Report (JFA)	Nishimura 48'	Stadium: Yodoko Sakura Stadium; Attendance: 3,157; Referee: Yuichi Nishimura

1 June 2022 Match 40	Vegalta Sendai	2−1	Honda FC	Sendai
19:00 JST	Nakayama 32'; Kato 37'	Report (JFA); Report (JFA)	Miura 13'	Stadium: Yurtec Stadium Sendai; Attendance: 1,587; Referee: Futoshi Nakamura

1 June 2022 Match 41	Yokohama F. Marinos	3−0	Suzuka Point Getters	Yokohama
19:00 JST	Nishimura 9'; Koike 75'; Ceará 90+3'	Report (JFA); Report (JFA)		Stadium: NHK Spring Mitsuzawa Football Stadium; Attendance: 4,009; Referee: Takafumi Mikuriya

1 June 2022 Match 42	Fagiano Okayama	0−1	Tochigi SC	Okayama
19:00 JST		Report (JFA); Report (JFA)	Tokaç 87'	Stadium: City Light Stadium; Attendance: 1,802; Referee: Yuzo Sutani

1 June 2022 Match 43	Shimizu S-Pulse	8−0	Shunan University	Shizuoka
19:00 JST	Thiago 13', 33'; Disaro 41', 49', 52'; Nakayama 44', 56'; Takeshima 84' (o.g.)	Report (JFA); Report (JFA)		Stadium: IAI Stadium Nihondaira; Attendance: 1,616; Referee: Hiroki Kasahara

1 June 2022 Match 44	Kyoto Sanga	3−1 (a.e.t.)	Kochi United	Kyoto
19:00 JST	Yamasaki 82', 105+1'; Omae 99'	Report (JFA); Report (JFA)	Akahoshi 69'	Stadium: Takebishi Stadium Kyoto; Attendance: 1,708; Referee: Toshihiro Nakai

1 June 2022 Match 45	Sagan Tosu	1−0	Verspah Oita	Tosu
19:00 JST	Diego 44'	Report (JFA); Report (JFA)		Stadium: Ekimae Real Estate Stadium; Attendance: 2,746; Referee: Akihiko Akeuchi

1 June 2022 Match 46	Albirex Niigata	1−4	Roasso Kumamoto	Niigata
19:00 JST	Komi 11'	Report (JFA); Report (JFA)	Sugata 8'; Sakamoto 25'; Takemoto 66'; Kawahara 88'	Stadium: Denka Big Swan Stadium; Attendance: 4,135; Referee: Shingo Kuniyoshi

8 June 2022 Match 47	Hokkaido Consadole Sapporo	4−3 (a.e.t.)	Toin University of Yokohama	Sapporo
18:00 JST	Kaneko 57', 111'; Aoki 68'; Okamura 90+5'	Report (JFA); Report (JFA)	Shirawachi 18', 23'; Teranuma 89'	Stadium: Sapporo Atsubetsu Stadium; Attendance: 1,642; Referee: Toru Kakinuma

1 June 2022 Match 48	Ventforet Kofu	5−1	International Pacific University	Kōfu
18:00 JST	Naito 7', 70'; Iijima 58'; Nakayama 80', 90'	Report (JFA); Report (JFA)	Mori 29'	Stadium: JIT Recycle Ink Stadium; Attendance: 1,250; Referee: Yusuke Ohashi

1 June 2022 Match 49	Vissel Kobe	3−2	Kataller Toyama	Kobe
18:00 JST	Osako 70', 90+1'; Sasaki 89'	Report (JFA); Report (JFA)	Ando 5'; Takahashi 27'	Stadium: Noevir Stadium Kobe; Attendance: 2,335; Referee: Koei Koya

1 June 2022 Match 50	Mito HollyHock	1−2 (a.e.t.)	Renofa Yamaguchi	Mito
19:00 JST	Takai 76'	Report (JFA); Report (JFA)	Shimaya 4'; Numata 106'	Stadium: K's denki Stadium Mito; Attendance: 845; Referee: Kazuyoshi Karashima

1 June 2022 Match 51	Kashiwa Reysol	1−0	University of Tsukuba	Kashiwa
19:00 JST	Takahashi 59'	Report (JFA); Report (JFA)		Stadium: Sankyo Frontier Kashiwa Stadium; Attendance: 2,435; Referee: Hirokazu Otsubo

1 June 2022 Match 52	Tokushima Vortis	2−1	Fukuyama City	Naruto
19:00 JST	Rio Hyeon 11'; Bakenga 42'	Report (JFA); Report (JFA)	Takahashi 46'	Stadium: Pocarisweat Stadium; Attendance: 1,191; Referee: Kohei Yano

1 June 2022 Match 53	Urawa Red Diamonds	1−0	Fukushima United	Saitama
19:00 JST	Akimoto 47'	Report (JFA); Report (JFA)		Stadium: Urawa Komaba Stadium; Attendance: 6,812; Referee: Takuto Okabe

1 June 2022 Match 54	Montedio Yamagata	1−3	Thespakusatsu Gunma	Tendo
19:00 JST	Yokoyama 24'	Report (JFA); Report (JFA)	Kitagawa 6'; Tanaka 34'; Takagi 64'	Stadium: ND Soft Stadium Yamagata; Attendance: 2,052; Referee: Tatsuya Sakai

1 June 2022 Match 55	Sanfrecce Hiroshima	2−0	Honda Lock	Fukuyama
18:30 JST	Mitsuta 32'; Sasaki 53'	Report (JFA); Report (JFA)		Stadium: Fukuyama Tsuun Rose Stadium; Attendance: 2,463; Referee: Hayato Shimizu

8 June 2022 Match 56	Yokohama FC	3−3 (a.e.t.) (3−1 p)	Sony Sendai	Yokohama
19:00 JST	Vizeu 28'; Nishiyama 42', 115'	Report (JFA); Report (JFA)	Matsumoto 50'; Akimoto 57'; Hirata 93'	Stadium: NHK Spring Mitsuzawa Football Stadium; Attendance: 1,452; Referee: Shu Kawamata
	Penalties
	Vizeu (penalty scored); Takeda (penalty missed); Nakamura (penalty scored); Nakashio (penalty scored)		Yoshimori (penalty missed); Sasaki (penalty scored); Yamada (penalty missed); Sawada (penalty missed)

=== Third round ===
On 8 June 2022, all the teams in this round were confirmed, after all the remaining matches from the Second round came to an end. Match venues for the round were announced on 3 June 2022. Out of the four Japanese teams who got qualified for the 2022 AFC Champions League, only Vissel Kobe qualified for the second round.

22 June 2022 Match 57	Kawasaki Frontale	0−1	Tokyo Verdy	Kawasaki
19:00 JST		Report (JFA); Report (JFA)	Sato 69'	Stadium: Kawasaki Todoroki Stadium; Attendance: 7,534; Referee: Kazuyoshi Enomoto

22 June 2022 Match 58	Shonan Bellmare	0−1	Júbilo Iwata	Hiratsuka
18:30 JST		Report (JFA); Report (JFA)	Kurokawa 5'	Stadium: Lemon Gas Stadium Hiratsuka; Attendance: 1,955; Referee: Keigo Sendachi

22 June 2022 Match 59	Avispa Fukuoka	3−1	Iwate Grulla Morioka	Morioka
18:30 JST	Jogo 56'; Kitajima 79'; Watari 84'	Report (JFA); Report (JFA)	Brenner 70'	Stadium: Iwate Morioka Stadium; Attendance: 712; Referee: Yuichi Nishimura

22 June 2022 Match 60	FC Tokyo	2−3 (a.e.t.)	V-Varen Nagasaki	Isahaya
19:00 JST	Leandro 3'; Adaílton 45+1'	Report (JFA); Report (JFA)	Yamazaki 14'; Abe 32'; Cristiano 105+2'	Stadium: Transcosmos Stadium Nagasaki; Attendance: 2,808; Referee: Futoshi Nakamura

22 June 2022 Match 61	Kashima Antlers	3−0	Omiya Ardija	Saitama
19:00 JST	Nakama 16'; Suzuki 52'; Ueda 90'	Report (JFA); Report (JFA)		Stadium: NACK5 Stadium Omiya; Attendance: 6,161; Referee: Shu Kawamata

22 June 2022 Match 60	Gamba Osaka	3−1	Oita Trinita	Oita
19:00 JST	Yamami 49'; Patric 66', 89'	Report (JFA); Report (JFA)	Goya 14'	Stadium: Showa Denko Dome Oita; Attendance: 2,012; Referee: Takuto Okabe

22 June 2022 Match 63	Nagoya Grampus	1−0	Zweigen Kanazawa	Kanazawa
19:00 JST	Abe 51'	Report (JFA); Report (JFA)		Stadium: Ishikawa Athletics Stadium; Attendance: 2,959; Referee: Ryo Tanimoto

22 June 2022 Match 64	Cerezo Osaka	3−2	Vegalta Sendai	Sendai
19:00 JST	Bruno Mendes 31'; Jonjić 31'; Jean Patric 50'	Report (JFA); Report (JFA)	Kato 6'; Kamada 62'	Stadium: Yurtec Stadium Sendai; Attendance: 2,494; Referee: Koichiro Fukushima

22 June 2022 Match 65	Yokohama F. Marinos	0−2	Tochigi SC	Utsunomiya
19:00 JST		Report (JFA); Report (JFA)	Kambe 58'; Juninho 90+1'	Stadium: Kanseki Stadium Tochigi; Attendance: 3,923; Referee: Hiroki Kasahara

22 June 2022 Match 66	Shimizu S-Pulse	0−1	Kyoto Sanga	Shizuoka
19:00 JST		Report (JFA); Report (JFA)	Nakano 58'	Stadium: IAI Stadium Nihondaira; Attendance: 2,302; Referee: Hirokazu Otsubo

22 June 2022 Match 67	Sagan Tosu	3−2	Roasso Kumamoto	Kumamoto
19:00 JST	Sagara 22'; Kakita 58'; Miyashiro 74'	Report (JFA); Report (JFA)	Takahashi 19'; Kawahara 76'	Stadium: Egao Kenko Stadium; Attendance: 2,731; Referee: Hiroyuki Kimura

22 June 2022 Match 68	Hokkaido Consadole Sapporo	1−2	Ventforet Kofu	Kōfu
18:00 JST	Yamato 11' (o.g.)	Report (JFA); Report (JFA)	Mitsuhira 31', 39'	Stadium: JIT Recycle Ink Stadium; Attendance: 1,622; Referee: Koei Koya

22 June 2022 Match 69	Vissel Kobe	2−1	Renofa Yamaguchi	Yamaguchi
19:00 JST	Hatsuse 84'; Sakai 90'	Report (JFA); Report (JFA)	Ikegami 73'	Stadium: Ishin Me-Life Stadium; Attendance: 6,640; Referee: Hayato Shimizu

22 June 2022 Match 70	Kashiwa Reysol	2−1	Tokushima Vortis	Naruto
19:00 JST	Tsuchiya 51'; Mori 57'	Report (JFA); Report (JFA)	Nishino 5'	Stadium: Pocarisweat Stadium; Attendance: 6,640; Referee: Yoshiro Imamura

22 June 2022 Match 71	Urawa Red Diamonds	0−1	Thespakusatsu Gunma	Maebashi
19:00 JST		Report (JFA); Report (JFA)	Takagi 35'	Stadium: Shoda Shoyu Stadium Gunma; Attendance: 1,151; Referee: Hiroyoshi Takayama

22 June 2022 Match 72	Sanfrecce Hiroshima	5−0	Yokohama FC	Yokohama
19:00 JST	Morishima 12'; Higashi 58'; Douglas 75'; Matsumoto 90', 90+3'	Report (JFA); Report (JFA)		Stadium: NHK Spring Mitsuzawa Football Stadium; Attendance: 1,578; Referee: Ryuji Sato

=== Round of 16 ===
The match venues for the 4th round were announced on 22 June 2022, and the kick-off times were announced on 30 June 2022.

20 July 2022 Match 73	Tokyo Verdy	2−1 (a.e.t.)	Júbilo Iwata	Chōfu
19:00 JST	Arai 84' (pen.); Narawa 114'	Report (JFA); Report (JFA)	Germain 90+3'	Stadium: Ajinomoto Stadium; Attendance: 2,275; Referee: Yoshihiro Imamura

13 July 2022 Match 74	Avispa Fukuoka	2−0	V-Varen Nagasaki	Isahaya
19:00 JST	Watari 11'; Juanma 79'	Report (JFA); Report (JFA)		Stadium: Transcosmos Stadium Nagasaki; Attendance: 3,463; Referee: Yudai Yamamoto

13 July 2022 Match 75	Kashima Antlers	2−0	Gamba Osaka	Kashima
19:00 JST	Pituca 71'; Everaldo 75'	Report (JFA); Report (JFA)		Stadium: Kashima Soccer Stadium; Attendance: 3,663; Referee: Akihiko Ikeuchi

13 July 2022 Match 76	Nagoya Grampus	1−2	Cerezo Osaka	Osaka
18:30 JST	Mateus 69'	Report (JFA); Report (JFA)	Fujii 7' (o.g.); Tameda 88'	Stadium: Yodoko Sakura Stadium; Attendance: 3,734; Referee: Hiroki Kasahara

13 July 2022 Match 77	Tochigi SC	1−2	Kyoto Sanga	Utsunomiya
19:00 JST	Miyazaki 36'	Report (JFA); Report (JFA)	Toyokawa 6'; Ismaila 90+3'	Stadium: Kanseki Stadium Tochigi; Attendance: 2,376; Referee: Hayato Shimizu

13 July 2022 Match 78	Sagan Tosu	1−3	Ventforet Kofu	Kōfu
18:00 JST	Miyashiro 75'	Report (JFA); Report (JFA)	Paraíba 33', 37'; Matsumoto 76'	Stadium: JIT Recycle Ink Stadium; Attendance: 1,820; Referee: Koichiro Fukushima

13 July 2022 Match 79	Vissel Kobe	2−1	Kashiwa Reysol	Kobe
19:00 JST	Sasaki 40'; Hatsuse 86'	Report (JFA); Report (JFA)	Shiihashi 61'	Stadium: Noevir Stadium Kobe; Attendance: 3,776; Referee: Yuichi Nishimura

13 July 2022 Match 80	Thespakusatsu Gunma	0−1	Sanfrecce Hiroshima	Maebashi
19:00 JST		Report (JFA); Report (JFA)	Shiotani 57'	Stadium: Shoda Shoyu Stadium Gunma; Attendance: 2,362; Referee: Ryo Tanimoto

=== Quarter-finals ===
A draw was conducted to determine the matchups of the quarter-final stage and onwards, on 15 July, and all the teams on the round were made known on 20 July. Six of the teams featuring in this round play in the J1 League, while the other 2, Tokyo Verdy and Ventforet Kofu, play in the J2 League.

7 September 2022 Match 81	Avispa Fukuoka	1–2 (a.e.t.)	Ventforet Kofu	Fukuoka
19:00 JST	Moriyama 27'	Report (JFA); Report (JFA)	Mitsuhira 16'; Torikai 97'	Stadium: Best Denki Stadium; Attendance: 1,948; Referee: Yusuke Araki

7 September 2022 Match 82	Vissel Kobe	0−1	Kashima Antlers	Kobe
19:00 JST		Report (JFA); Report (JFA)	Suzuki 62'	Stadium: Noevir Stadium Kobe; Attendance: 4,931; Referee: Jumpei Iida

7 September 2022 Match 83	Kyoto Sanga	2−1	Tokyo Verdy	Chōfu
19:00 JST	Paulinho 21', 53'	Report (JFA); Report (JFA)	Taniguchi 90'	Stadium: Ajinomoto Stadium; Attendance: 2,454; Referee: Akihiko Ikeuchi

7 September 2022 Match 84	Cerezo Osaka	1−2	Sanfrecce Hiroshima	Osaka
18:30 JST	Taggart 40'	Report (JFA); Report (JFA)	Kashiwa 86'; Kawamura 90+1'	Stadium: Yodoko Sakura Stadium; Attendance: 5,054; Referee: Futoshi Nakamura

=== Semi-finals ===
Three teams from the J1, and one team from the J2, survived until the semi-finals. Sanfrecce Hiroshima qualified to the semi-finals while sitting as J1's 2nd-placed team, Kashima Antlers as J1's 4th-place, and Kyoto Sanga as J1's 13th-place, one point off the relegation zone. Kick-off times, broadcaster, and venues were released by JFA on 16 September. Both matches were broadcast on NHK BS1 in Japan.

5 October 2022 Match 85	Ventforet Kofu	1–0	Kashima Antlers	Kashima
17:30 JST	Miyazaki 37'	Report (JFA); Report (JFA)		Stadium: Kashima Soccer Stadium; Attendance: 8,965; Referee: Koichiro Fukushima

5 October 2022 Match 86	Kyoto Sanga	1–2 (a.e.t.)	Sanfrecce Hiroshima	Kameoka
19:30 JST	Ismaila 79'	Report (JFA); Report (JFA)	Douglas 40' (pen.); Ben Khalifa 95'	Stadium: Sanga Stadium by Kyocera; Attendance: 6,787; Referee: Hajime Matsuo

=== Final ===
16 October 2022	Ventforet Kofu	1–1 (a.e.t.) (5–4 p)	Sanfrecce Hiroshima	Yokohama
14:00 JST	Mitsuhira 26'	Report (JFA); Report (JFA)	Kawamura 84'	Stadium: Nissan Stadium; Attendance: 37,998; Referee: Ryuji Sato
	Penalties
	Lira (penalty scored); Getúlio (penalty scored); Matsumoto (penalty scored); Ishikawa (penalty scored); Yamamoto (penalty scored)		(penalty scored) Sotiriou; (penalty scored) Matsumoto; (penalty scored) Ben Khalifa; (penalty missed) Kawamura; (penalty scored) Mitsuta

== Top scorers ==
Rank	Player	Club	Goals
1	(Japan) Junya Takahashi	Fukushima United	4
1	(Japan) Kazushi Mitsuhira	Ventforet Kofu	4
3	(Japan) Akira Silvano Disaro	Shimizu S-Pulse	3
3	(Japan) Paulo Junichi Tanaka	Matsumoto Yamaga	3
3	(Japan) Ryusei Fujita	Vertfee Yaita	3
3	(Brazil) Patric	Gamba Osaka	3
