= 2022 Júbilo Iwata season =

Júbilo Iwata
2022 season
- Chairman: Yoshiro Takahira
- Manager: Akira Ito (until 14 August); Hiroki Shibuya (from 17 August)
- Stadium: Yamaha Stadium
- J1 League: 18th, relegated
- Emperor's Cup: Round of 16
- J.League Cup: Group stage
- Top goalscorer: League: Fabián González (6); All: Fabián González (7)
- Biggest win: 1–4 against Kyoto Sanga; 5–2 against Matsumoto Yamaga
- Biggest defeat: 0–6 against Urawa Red Diamonds
Home colours	Away colours
- All statistics correct as of 11 September 2022.

The 2022 Júbilo Iwata season was the club's 50th season in existence and the first season back in the top flight of Japanese football. In addition to the domestic league, Júbilo Iwata participated in this season's editions of the Emperor's Cup and the J.League Cup. Finishing at last place at the J1 League, the club got relegated back to the J2 League after just a season back on the first division.

== Players ==
=== First-team squad ===
As of 4 August 2022

Note: Flags indicate national team as defined under FIFA eligibility rules; some limited exceptions apply. Players may hold more than one non-FIFA nationality.

No.	Pos.	Nation	Player
1	GK	JPN	Naoki Hatta
2	DF	JPN	Norimichi Yamamoto
3	DF	JPN	Kentaro Oi
4	DF	JPN	Ko Matsubara
5	DF	JPN	Daiki Ogawa
6	DF	JPN	Makito Ito
7	MF	JPN	Rikiya Uehara
8	MF	JPN	Kotaro Omori
9	FW	JPN	Kenyu Sugimoto (on loan from Urawa Red Diamonds)
10	MF	JPN	Hiroki Yamada
11	FW	JPN	Yuki Otsu
14	MF	JPN	Masaya Matsumoto
17	MF	JPN	Yuto Suzuki
18	FW	JPN	Ryo Germain
21	GK	JPN	Ryuki Miura
23	MF	JPN	Kosuke Yamamoto

No.	Pos.	Nation	Player
24	GK	JPN	Yuji Kajikawa
25	DF	JPN	Riku Morioka
27	FW	JPN	Mahiro Yoshinaga
28	MF	JPN	Naoki Kanuma
29	FW	COL	Fabián González
31	MF	JPN	Yosuke Furukawa
32	MF	JPN	Atsushi Kurokawa
33	MF	BRA	Dudu
36	DF	BRA	Ricardo Graça
37	GK	MDA	Alexei Koșelev
38	MF	JPN	Kensuke Fujiwara
39	DF	JPN	Ryo Takano
40	FW	JPN	Shota Kaneko
44	MF	JPN	Hiroto Uemura ^{DSP}
50	MF	JPN	Yasuhito Endō

=== Out on loan ===
Note: Flags indicate national team as defined under FIFA eligibility rules; some limited exceptions apply. Players may hold more than one non-FIFA nationality.

No.	Pos.	Nation	Player
26	DF	JPN	Yutaro Hakamata (On loan at Omiya Ardija)
—	DF	JPN	Kaito Suzuki (On loan at Tochigi SC)
—	DF	JPN	So Nakagawa (On loan at Ryukyu)

No.	Pos.	Nation	Player
—	MF	JPN	Takeaki Harigaya (On loan at Giravanz Kitakyushu)
—	MF	JPN	Kotaro Fujikawa (On loan at Giravanz Kitakyushu)
—	FW	JPN	Naoto Miki (On loan at Fujieda MYFC)

== Transfers ==
=== In ===
No.	Pos	Player	Transferred from	Fee	Date	Source
38	FW	(Japan) Kensuke Fujiwara	(Japan) Júbilo Iwata U-18	Promotion	15 October 2022	
31	MF	(Japan) Yosuke Furukawa	(Japan) Shizuoka Gakuen High School	Free transfer	16 October 2022	
18	FW	(Japan) Ryo Germain	(Japan) Yokohama FC	Free transfer	23 December 2022	
26	DF	(Japan) Yutaro Hakamata	(Japan) Yokohama FC	Free transfer	23 December 2022	
36	DF	(Brazil) Ricardo Graça	(Brazil) Vasco	Undisclosed	23 December 2022	
6	DF	(Japan) Makito Ito	(Japan) Yokohama F. Marinos	Undisclosed	24 December 2022	
40	MF	(Japan) Shota Kaneko	(Japan) Shimizu S-Pulse	Undisclosed	24 December 2022	
27	GK	(Japan) Yuji Kajikawa	(Japan) Yokohama F. Marinos	Undisclosed	27 December 2022	
50	MF	(Japan) Yasuhito Endo	(Japan) Gamba Osaka	Undisclosed	27 December 2022	
7	MF	(Japan) Rikiya Uehara	(Japan) Vegalta Sendai	Back from loan	28 December 2022	
32	FW	(Japan) Atsushi Kurokawa	(Japan) Omiya Ardija	Undisclosed	29 December 2022	
33	MF	(Brazil) Dudu	(Brazil) Vila Nova	Undisclosed	29 December 2022	
9	FW	(Japan) Kenyu Sugimoto	(Japan) Urawa Red Diamonds	Loan	30 December 2022	
4	DF	(Japan) Ko Matsubara	(Belgium) Sint-Truiden	Free transfer	23 July 2022	

=== Out ===
No.	Pos	Player	Transferred to	Fee	Date	Source
41	DF	(Japan) Chiharu Kato	Unattached	End of contract	6 December 2021	
11	FW	(Brazil) Lukian	(Japan) Avispa Fukuoka	Free transfer	9 January 2021	
19	FW	(Japan) Naoto Miki	(Japan) Fujieda MYFC	Loan	21 December 2021	
9	FW	(Japan) Koki Ogawa	(Japan) Yokohama FC	Free transfer	27 December 2021	
35	DF	(Japan) Kaito Suzuki	(Japan) Tochigi SC	Loan	28 December 2021	
13	MF	(Japan) Kotaro Fujikawa	(Japan) Giravanz Kitakyushu	Loan	28 December 2021	
21	GK	(Japan) Daichi Sugimoto	(Japan) Vegalta Sendai	Undisclosed	28 December 2021	
22	DF	(Japan) So Nakagawa	(Japan) FC Ryukyu	Loan	5 January 2022	
44	DF	(Japan) Shun Obu	(Japan) Fukushima United	Undisclosed	23 January 2022	
2	DF	(Japan) Yasuyuki Konno	(Japan) Nankatsu SC	Undisclosed	25 January 2022	
15	DF	(Japan) Hiroki Ito	(Germany) VfB Stuttgart	Undisclosed	20 May 2022	
26	DF	(Japan) Yutaro Hakamata	(Japan) Omiya Ardija	Loan	24 July 2022	
30	MF	(Japan) Naoya Seita	(Japan) Fukushima United	Loan	1 August 2022	

== Competitions ==
=== Overall record ===
Competition	First match	Last match	Starting round	Final position	Record							
Competition	First match	Last match	Starting round	Final position	Pld	W	D	L	GF	GA	GD	Win %
J1 League	19 February 2022	5 November 2022	Matchday 1	18th place	34	6	12	16	32	57	−25	17.65
Emperor's Cup	1 June 2022	20 July 2022	Second round	Round of 16	3	2	0	1	7	4	+3	66.67
J.League Cup	2 March 2022	18 May 2022	Group stage	Group stage	6	2	1	3	4	5	−1	33.33
Total					43	10	13	20	43	66	−23	23.26

Source: Soccerway

=== J1 League ===
==== League table ====
Pos	Team	Pld	W	D	L	GF	GA	GD	Pts	Qualification or relegation
14	Avispa Fukuoka	34	9	11	14	29	38	−9	38	
15	Gamba Osaka	34	9	10	15	33	44	−11	37	
16	Kyoto Sanga (O)	34	8	12	14	30	38	−8	36	Qualification for relegation playoffs
17	Shimizu S-Pulse (R)	34	7	12	15	44	54	−10	33	Relegation to the J2 League
18	Júbilo Iwata (R)	34	6	12	16	32	57	−25	30	Relegation to the J2 League

Source: J.League Data Site
Rules for classification: 1) Points; 2) Goal difference; 3) Goals scored; 4) Head-to-head points; 5) Head-to-head goal difference; 6) Head-to-head goals scored; 7) Fewer disciplinary points.
(O) Play-off winners; (R) Relegated

==== Results summary ====
Overall								Home						Away					
Pld	W	D	L	GF	GA	GD	Pts	W	D	L	GF	GA	GD	W	D	L	GF	GA	GD
34	6	12	16	32	57	−25	30	4	7	6	21	28	−7	2	5	10	11	29	−18

Source: Soccerway

==== Results by round ====
Round	1	2	3	4	5	6	7	8	9	10	11	12	13	14	15	16	17	18	19	20	21	22	23	24	25	26	27	28	29	30	31	32	33	34
Ground	A	H	A	H	A	A	H	A	H	H	A	A	H	H	A	H	H	A	A	H	H	A	H	A	H	A	A	H	A	H	A	H	A	H
Result	D	L	W	D	L	L	D	D	D	W	L	L	W	L	D	L	W	D	L	L	L	L	W	L	L	L	W	D	L	D	D	D	L	L
Position	10	15	5	7	12	15	14	15	15	14	15	16	14	15	14	15	15	15	16	16	18	18	16	17	18	18	18	18	18	18	18	18	18	18

Source: Soccerway
A = Away; H = Home; W = Win; D = Draw; L = Loss

==== Matches ====
The league fixtures were announced on 21 January 2022.

19 February 2022 1	Avispa Fukuoka	1–1	Júbilo Iwata	Hakata
14:00 (UTC+9)	Maejima 61'	Report	Germain 90+3'	Stadium: Best Denki Stadium; Attendance: 6,217; Referee: Hajime Matsuo

26 February 2022 2	Júbilo Iwata	1–2	Shimizu S-Pulse	Fukuroi
13:30 (UTC+9)	Suzuki 23'	Report	Suzuki 9'; Nakayama 67'	Stadium: Ecopa Stadium; Attendance: 19,130; Referee: Koei Koya

5 March 2022 3	Kyoto Sanga	1–4	Júbilo Iwata	Kameoka
14:00 (UTC+9)	Utaka 67'	Report	Otsu 35'; Suzuki 62', 68'; Germain 90'	Stadium: Sanga Stadium by Kyocera; Attendance: 7,894; Referee: Tomohiro Inoue

12 March 2022 4	Júbilo Iwata	1–1	Gamba Osaka	Iwata
14:00 (UTC+9)	Omori 15'	Report	Pereira 88'	Stadium: Yamaha Stadium; Attendance: 10,669; Referee: Takafumi Mikuriya

19 March 2022 5	Urawa Red Diamonds	4–1	Júbilo Iwata	Saitama
15:00 (UTC+9)	Inukai 8'; Junker 11'; Scholz 37' (pen.); Karlsson 48'	Report	Suzuki 14'	Stadium: Saitama Stadium 2002; Attendance: 24,207; Referee: Futoshi Nakamura

2 April 2022 6	Kashiwa Reysol	2–0	Júbilo Iwata	Kashiwa
15:00 (UTC+9)	Sávio 41'; Toshima 52'	Report		Stadium: Sankyo Frontier Kashiwa Stadium; Attendance: 8,332; Referee: Hayato Shimizu

6 April 2022 7	Júbilo Iwata	1–1	Kawasaki Frontale	Iwata
19:00 (UTC+9)	Omori 78'	Report	Chinen 90+4'	Stadium: Yamaha Stadium; Attendance: 7,508; Referee: Masuya Ueda

10 April 2022 8	Shonan Bellmare	0–0	Júbilo Iwata	Hiratsuka
15:00 (UTC+9)		Report		Stadium: Lemon Gas Stadium; Attendance: 8,257; Referee: Takuto Okabe

17 April 2022 9	Júbilo Iwata	2–2	Sanfrecce Hiroshima	Iwata
16:00 (UTC+9)	Suzuki 39'; González 89'	Report	Graça 46' (o.g.); Mitsuta 61'	Stadium: Yamaha Stadium; Attendance: 7,393; Referee: Ryo Tanimoto

28 April 2022 10	Júbilo Iwata	2–1	Nagoya Grampus	Iwata
19:00 (UTC+9)	Otsu 84', 85'	Report	Mateus 43'	Stadium: Yamaha Stadium; Attendance: 7,690; Referee: Hiroki Kasahara

3 May 2022 11	Kashima Antlers	3–1	Júbilo Iwata	Kashima
15:00 (UTC+9)	Caíke 29'; Ueda 35', 78'	Report	González 71'	Stadium: Kashima Soccer Stadium; Attendance: 26,493; Referee: Hayato Shimizu

6 May 2022 12	Cerezo Osaka	2–1	Júbilo Iwata	Osaka
19:00 (UTC+9)	Maikuma 32', 40'	Report	González 79'	Stadium: Yodoko Sakura Stadium; Attendance: 13,479; Referee: Yusuke Araki

14 May 2022 13	Júbilo Iwata	2–1	FC Tokyo	Iwata
14:00 (UTC+9)	Uehara 43'; Kanuma 88'	Report	Adaílton 79'	Stadium: Yamaha Stadium; Attendance: 11,725; Referee: Yoshiro Imamura

22 May 2022 14	Júbilo Iwata	1–2	Hokkaido Consadole Sapporo	Iwata
15:00 (UTC+9)	Yamamoto 8'	Report	Fukai 28'; Komai 55'	Stadium: Yamaha Stadium; Attendance: 8,279; Referee: Masuya Ueda

25 May 2022 15	Vissel Kobe	0–0	Júbilo Iwata	Kobe
19:00 (UTC+9)		Report		Stadium: Noevir Stadium Kobe; Attendance: 10,020; Referee: Ryo Tanimoto

29 May 2022 16	Júbilo Iwata	0–2	Yokohama F. Marinos	Iwata
16:00 (UTC+9)		Report	Nakagawa 55'; Ceará 63'	Stadium: Yamaha Stadium; Attendance: 10,196; Referee: Koichiro Fukushima

18 June 2022 17	Júbilo Iwata	3–1	Sagan Tosu	Iwata
18:00 (UTC+9)	González 8', 13', (yellow card) 47'; Kanuma 27'	Report	Miyashiro 53'; Tashiro (yellow card) 69'	Stadium: Yamaha Stadium; Attendance: 8,163; Referee: Yuichi Nishimura

25 June 2022 18	Kawasaki Frontale	1–1	Júbilo Iwata	Kawasaki
19:00 (UTC+9)	Yamane 33'	Report	Ito 85'	Stadium: Kawasaki Todoroki Stadium; Attendance: 19,024; Referee: Hajime Matsuo

2 July 2022 19	Sanfrecce Hiroshima	3–0	Júbilo Iwata	Hiroshima
18:30 (UTC+9)	Araki 22'; Sasaki 63'; Morishima 68'	Report		Stadium: Edion Stadium Hiroshima; Attendance: 9,969; Referee: Koei Koya

6 July 2022 20	Júbilo Iwata	0–1	Avispa Fukuoka	Iwata
19:00 (UTC+9)		Report	Yamagishi 52'	Stadium: Yamaha Stadium; Attendance: 5,043; Referee: Koichiro Fukushima

9 July 2022 21	Júbilo Iwata	0–1	Vissel Kobe	Iwata
19:00 (UTC+9)		Report	Osako 76' (pen.)	Stadium: Yamaha Stadium; Attendance: 13,256; Referee: Hiroki Kasahara

17 July 2022 22	FC Tokyo	2–0	Júbilo Iwata	Tokyo
19:00 (UTC+9)	Kimoto 4'; Watanabe 14'	Report		Stadium: Ajinomoto Stadium; Attendance: 18,212; Referee: Hiroyuki Kimura

30 July 2022 23	Júbilo Iwata	1–0	Shonan Bellmare	Iwata
18:30 (UTC+9)	Kaneko 77'	Report		Stadium: Yamaha Stadium; Attendance: 8,708; Referee: Akihiko Ikeuchi

7 August 2022 24	Sagan Tosu	2–0	Júbilo Iwata	Tosu
19:00 (UTC+9)	Miyashiro 43'; Kakita 85'	Report		Stadium: Ekimae Stadium; Attendance: 7,655; Referee: Futoshi Nakamura

13 August 2022 25	Júbilo Iwata	0–6	Urawa Red Diamonds	Fukuroi
18:30 (UTC+9)		Report	Karlsson 5', 40'; Koizumi 13', 66'; Ito 63'; Junker 79'	Stadium: Ecopa Stadium; Attendance: 12,462; Referee: Yudai Yamamoto

19 August 2022 26	Nagoya Grampus	1–0	Júbilo Iwata	Toyota
19:30 (UTC+9)	Mateus 19'	Report		Stadium: Toyota Stadium; Attendance: 21,683; Referee: Koichiro Fukushima

3 September 2022 28	Júbilo Iwata	2–2	Kashiwa Reysol	Fukuroi
18:30 (UTC+9)	Yoshinaga 73'; González 77'	Report	Douglas 23'; Muto 45+2'	Stadium: Ecopa Stadium; Attendance: 9,183; Referee: Akihiko Ikeuchi

11 September 2022 29	Hokkaido Consadole Sapporo	4–0	Júbilo Iwata	Sapporo
13:05 (UTC+9)	Fukumori 10'; Gabriel Xavier 21'; Takamine 90'; Ogashiwa 90+6'	Report		Stadium: Sapporo Dome; Attendance: 14,117; Referee: Tomohiro Inoue

17 September 2022 30	Júbilo Iwata	2–2	Cerezo Osaka	Iwata
18:03 (UTC+9)	Kaneko 57'; Shindo 70' (o.g.)	Report	Taggart 25'; Shindo 52'	Stadium: Yamaha Stadium; Attendance: 8,089; Referee: Hayato Shimizu

8 October 2022 32	Júbilo Iwata	3–3	Kashima Antlers	Iwata
14:03 (UTC+9)	Suzuki 31'; Kaneko 33'; Sugimoto 45+5' (pen.)	Report	Higuchi 13'; Eleke 47'; Everaldo 90+3'	Stadium: Yamaha Stadium; Attendance: 9,746; Referee: Masuya Ueda

12 October 2022 27	Yokohama F. Marinos	0–1	Júbilo Iwata	Yokohama
19:05 (UTC+9)		Report	Furukawa 84'	Stadium: Nissan Stadium; Attendance: 20,493; Referee: Jumpei Iida

22 October 2022 31	Shimizu S-Pulse	1–1	Júbilo Iwata	Shizuoka
14:05 (UTC+9)	Santana 34'	Report	Germain 90+2'	Stadium: IAI Stadium Nihondaira; Attendance: 18,182; Referee: Ryuji Sato
Note: The Shizuoka derby that was due to be played on 1 October, had to be rescheduled on 28 September, due to Typhoon No. 15's strike in the Shizuoka region. Areas of Shizuoka City at the time remained without water, and roads near the stadium suffered from landslides, making it difficult to ensure the safety of attending fans and hold the match to standard.

29 October 2022 33	Gamba Osaka	2–0	Júbilo Iwata	Suita
15:05 (UTC+9)	Meshino 66'; Patric 73'	Report		Stadium: Panasonic Stadium Suita; Attendance: 27,988; Referee: Hajime Matsuo

5 November 2022 34	Júbilo Iwata	0–0	Kyoto Sanga	Iwata
14:05 (UTC+9)		Report		Stadium: Yamaha Stadium; Attendance: 12,045; Referee: Ryo Tanimoto

=== Emperor's Cup ===
1 June 2022 Second round	Júbilo Iwata	5–2	Matsumoto Yamaga	Iwata
19:00 JST (UTC+9)	Seita 9'; Kurokawa 14'; Kanuma 52'; Yoshinaga 55'; Furukawa 68'	Report	Tanaka 4'; Komatsu 82'	Stadium: Yamaha Stadium

22 June 2022 Third round	Shonan Bellmare	0–1	Júbilo Iwata	Hiratsuka
18:30 JST (UTC+9)		Report	Kurokawa 5'	Stadium: Lemon Gas Stadium Hiratsuka

20 July 2022 Round of 16	Tokyo Verdy	2–1 (a.e.t.)	Júbilo Iwata	Chōfu
19:00 JST (UTC+9)	Arai 84' (pen.); Narawa 114'	Report	Germain 90+3'	Stadium: Ajinomoto Stadium; Attendance: 2,275; Referee: Yoshihiro Imamura

=== J.League Cup ===
==== Group stage ====
Pos	Team	Pld	W	D	L	GF	GA	GD	Pts	Qualification
1	Shonan Bellmare	6	4	0	2	9	6	+3	12	Advance to play-off stage
2	Avispa Fukuoka	6	3	1	2	6	6	0	10	Advance to play-off stage
3	Júbilo Iwata	6	2	1	3	4	5	−1	7	
4	FC Tokyo	6	1	2	3	4	6	−2	5	

Source: JLeague.co (EN), JLeague.jp (JA)
Rules for classification: Tiebreakers

2 March 2022 2	Júbilo Iwata	0–1	Shonan Bellmare	Iwata
19:00 (UTC+9)		Report	Ikeda 43'	Stadium: Yamaha Stadium; Attendance: 4,012; Referee: Yoshiro Imamura

15 March 2022 1	FC Tokyo	0–0	Júbilo Iwata	Chōfu
19:00 (UTC+9)		Report		Stadium: Ajinomoto Stadium; Attendance: 7,817; Referee: Takuto Okabe
Note: The match was originally scheduled for 23 February 2022, but was postponed due to a COVID-19 outbreak in FC Tokyo's squad.

26 March 2022 3	Júbilo Iwata	1–0	Avispa Fukuoka	Iwata
14:00 (UTC+9)	Kaneko 53'	Report		Stadium: Yamaha Stadium; Attendance: 4,613; Referee: Yudai Yamamoto

13 April 2022 4	Avispa Fukuoka	2–1	Júbilo Iwata	Fukuoka
19:00 (UTC+9)	Lukian 72'; Shigehiro 86'	Report	Matsumoto 66'	Stadium: Best Denki Stadium; Attendance: 1,971; Referee: Takafumi Mikuriya

23 April 2022 5	Júbilo Iwata	2–1	FC Tokyo	Iwata
15:00 (UTC+9)	González 68'; Kanuma 90+7'	Report	Kajiura 55'	Stadium: Yamaha Stadium; Attendance: 5,422; Referee: Tomohiro Inoue

18 May 2022 6	Shonan Bellmare	1–0	Júbilo Iwata	Hiratsuka
19:00 (UTC+9)	Ikeda 54'	Report		Stadium: Lemon Gas Stadium; Attendance: 4,132; Referee: Yosuke Kubota

== Statistics ==
=== Goalscorers ===
Rank	Pos.	No.	Player	J1 League	Emperor's Cup	J.League Cup	Total
1	FW	29	(Colombia) Fabián González	6	0	1	7
2	MF	17	(Japan) Yuto Suzuki	6	0	0	6
3	FW	40	(Japan) Shota Kaneko	3	0	1	4
3	FW	18	(Japan) Ryo Germain	2	1	1	4
3	MF	28	(Japan) Naoki Kanuma	2	1	1	4
6	FW	11	(Japan) Yūki Ōtsu	3	0	0	3
7	MF	8	(Japan) Kotaro Omori	2	0	0	2
7	FW	27	(Japan) Mahiro Yoshinaga	1	1	0	2
7	FW	31	(Japan) Atsushi Kurokawa	0	2	0	2
10	DF	2	(Japan) Norimichi Yamamoto	1	0	0	1
10	DF	6	(Japan) Makito Ito	1	0	0	1
10	MF	7	(Japan) Rikiya Uehara	1	0	0	1
10	FW	9	(Japan) Kenyu Sugimoto	1	0	1	1
10	MF	30	(Japan) Naoya Seita	0	1	0	1
10	MF	31	(Japan) Yosuke Furukawa	0	1	0	1
10	FW	14	(Japan) Masaya Matsumoto	0	0	1	1
Total				29	7	5	41
