= Brew Saga =

Japanese football club

Brew SAGA
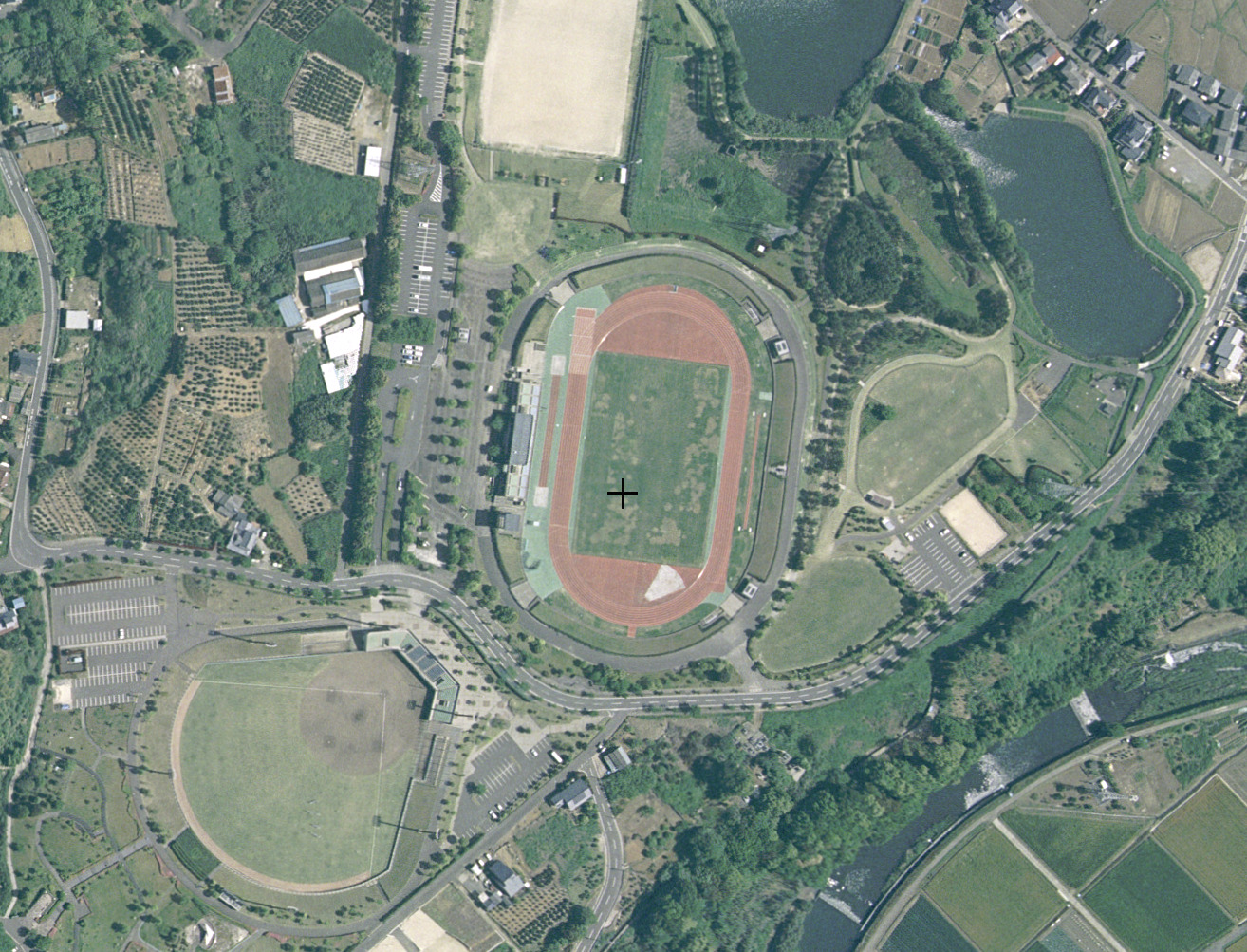
- Full name: Brew SAGA
- Nickname(s): Membrews
- Founded: 1991; 34 years ago
- Ground: Kashima City Athletics Stadium
- Capacity: 2,000 (seated)
- Manager: Tatsuya Nagayoshi
- League: Kyushu Soccer League
- 2024: 4th of 10
- Website: brewsaga.jp

Brew SAGA (ブリューさが, Buryū Saga) are a Japanese football club based on the city of Kashima, Saga. They play in the Kyushu Soccer League, one of Japan's fifth tier leagues, which is part of Japanese Regional Leagues.

== History ==
In 1991, the "F.C. INAX Soccer Club" was founded at the Saga Plant of Kyushu INAX (now Saga LIXIL Works), a subsidiary of INAX. Starting in the 5th division of the Saga Prefectural League, they climbed to the 1st division within five years. In 1997, the club changed its name to "Kyushu INAX Soccer Club."

In 1999, the club debuted in the 79th Emperor's Cup, where they faced Josai University and lost their opening match. By 2025, they had participated in the Emperor's Cup a total of 12 times.

In 2000, they claimed their first championship just five years after being promoted to the first division of the prefectural league. They also secured second place in the Kyushu Prefectural League Finals and earned promotion to the Kyushu League for the first time without needing a play-off match, thanks to NTT Kumamoto FC's promotion to the JFL.

They played in the Kyushu League for three seasons from 2001 to 2003, finishing 7th, 9th, and 11th, which led to their relegation to the Saga Prefectural League. In 2004, their first year after relegation, they won the title but were defeated by FC Ryukyu in the second round of the prefectural league finals. In 2005, they claimed back-to-back titles but lost in the first round of the finals to the Kumamoto Prefectural Teachers' Kicking Brigade, remaining in the Saga Prefectural League. In 2006, they missed out on a third straight title, losing to Kawazoe Club.

At this time, they achieved their first-ever victory in the Emperor's Cup by defeating Kashiwa Reysol U-18 in the opening round of the 85th Emperor's Cup in 2005.

In 2007, they clinched the prefectural league championship for the first time in two years and triumphed in the Kyushu prefectural league finals, making their return to the Kyushu League after five seasons.

In 2009, they secured victory in the Kyushu qualifiers and made their debut in the All-Japan Adult Football Championship. They triumphed in the first round against Sagawa Express Chugoku (ja) and in the second round against FC Korea, advancing to the quarterfinals, where they were defeated by AC Nagano Parceiro.

On July 1, 2011, the team's name was officially changed to "Saga LIXIL FC" following a rebranding in April of that year.

In 2015, they faced Oita Trinita in the first round of the 95th Emperor's Cup, their seventh appearance in the tournament. It was their first match against a J. League club, where they lost 0-2. They ended up finishing ninth in the Kyushu League and were relegated to the Saga Prefectural League for the first time in nine years after losing a play-off match to the Kumamoto Prefectural Teachers' Kicking Brigade. However, in 2016, they won the prefectural league and finished as runners-up in the final tournament of all Kyushu prefectural leagues. With Kagoshima United FC Second ceasing activities, the team returned to the Kyushu League within a year without requiring a play-off match.

In the 2019 Kyushu League, the team achieved a record third-place finish. However, in the summer of 2021, due to the impact of the new coronavirus and a decline in business performance, the company decided to stop supporting the team. In response, the team transitioned into a club team in 2022 with backing from around 50 local companies. A management corporation called "General Sports Union Brew Kashima" was established, and the team's name was changed to "Brew KASHIMA" (Brew Kashima). The name "Brew" reflects the region's sake brewing tradition and is derived from the nickname "Menbrews" used during the LIXIL era. It also symbolises traditional performing arts like Menbutsu and hook flotation. The emblem and mascot remain almost identical to those of Saga LIXIL FC.

On January 7, 2025, the team was renamed "Brew SAGA" (Brew Saga), and the operating corporation became "Football Club Saga Co., Ltd." to expand its activity area across the entire Saga Prefecture. The emblem was also updated while retaining the motif of the floating face. Former FC Gifu staff and management consultant Miyagi "Ryo" was appointed as the representative director, while former Fukuoka SoftBank Hawks Keinosuke Ichikawa and Hitoshi Isozaki joined as new directors. On January 16, an advisory contract was signed with Takahiro Masukawa. Following an open recruitment process, Hayato Chichiiwa, an active university student, was appointed as a new director.

== Names throughout history ==
- 1991–1996: FC Inax SC
- 1997–2011: Kyushu Inax SC
- 2011–2021: Saga Lixil FC
- 2022–2024: Brew Kashima ("Brew" in the club's name relates to Sake brewing, a form of commerce prominent in the club's local community. "Kashima" literally means where are they club from.)
- 2025–: Brew SAGA (The name and hometown was changed to reflect their area of operation expansion from Kashima City to the entire Saga Prefecture)

== League and cup record ==
| Champions | Runners-up | Third place | Promoted | Relegated |

| League | | | | | | | | | | | | | Emperor's Cup |
| Season | Division | Pos. | P | W | PKW | D | PKL | L | F | A | GD | Pts | Emperor's Cup |
|---|---|---|---|---|---|---|---|---|---|---|---|---|---|
Saga Lixil FC
| 2017 | Kyushu Soccer League | 9th | 20 | 4 | 2 | – | 1 | 13 | 27 | 39 | -12 | 17 | Did not qualify |
| 2018 | Kyushu Soccer League | 7th | 18 | 5 | 2 | – | 3 | 8 | 27 | 29 | -2 | 22 | First round |
| 2019 | Kyushu Soccer League | 3rd | 18 | 9 | 1 | – | 0 | 8 | 37 | 31 | 6 | 29 | First round |
| 2020 | Kyushu Soccer League | League season cancelled because of COVID-19 | | | | | | | | | | | Did not qualify |
| 2021 | Kyushu Soccer League | 4th | 18 | 8 | 1 | – | 1 | 8 | 50 | 37 | 13 | 27 | Did not qualify |
Brew Kashima
| 2022 | Kyushu Soccer League | 6th | 18 | 8 | – | 2 | – | 10 | 28 | 55 | -27 | 26 | First round |
| 2023 | Kyushu Soccer League | 7th | 18 | 5 | – | 5 | – | 8 | 17 | 22 | -5 | 20 | First round |
| 2024 | Kyushu Soccer League | 4th | 18 | 10 | - | 1 | - | 7 | 36 | 35 | 1 | 31 | Did not qualify |
Brew Saga
| 2025 | Kyushu Soccer League | 6th | 18 | 5 | - | 3 | - | 10 | 22 | 32 | −10 | 18 | 2nd round |
| 2026 | Kyushu Soccer League | TBD | 18 | | - | | - | | | | | | TBD |

Key

- Pos. = Position in league; P = Games played; W = Games won after 90 minutes; PKW = Games won by penalty shoot-out; D = Games drawn; PKL = Games lost by penalty shoot-out; L = Games lost after 90 minutes; F = Goals scored; A = Goals conceded; GD = Goal difference; Pts = Points won

== Honours ==
Brew Kashima honours
| Honour | No. | Years |
|---|---|---|
| Saga Prefectural Football Championship Emperor's Cup Prefectural Qualifiers | 12 | 1999, 2002, 2003, 2005, 2008, 2011, 2015, 2018, 2019, 2022, 2023, 2025 |
| Saga Prefecture League 1st Division | 5 | 2000, 2004, 2005, 2007, 2016 |

== Emperor's Cup performance ==
The club qualified to it 11 times, after winning the aforementioned Saga Prefecture Football Championship, which serves as a prefectural qualification for the Emperor's Cup. At the competition, they failed to progress from the 1st round in all attempts but one.

| 28 November 1999 EC 1R | Kyushu Inax | 1–4 | Josai University | Saitama |
| | | | | Stadium: NACK5 Stadium Omiya |

| 1 December 2002 EC 1R | Kyushu Inax | 0–5 | Mito HollyHock | Tosu |
| | | | | Stadium: Ekimae Real Estate Stadium |

| 30 November 2003 EC 1R | Kyushu Inax | 0–4 | Sagawa Express Tokyo SC | Kita |
| | | | | Stadium: Ajinomoto Field Nishigaoka |

| 17 September 2005 EC 1R | Kyushu Inax | 2–1 | Kashiwa Reysol U-18 | Akita |
| | | | | Stadium: Soyu Stadium |

| 19 September 2005 EC 2R | Kyushu Inax | 1–5 | Yokohama FC | Akita |
| | | | | Stadium: Soyu Stadium |

| 14 September 2008 EC 1R | Kyushu Inax | 1–3 | Okinawa Kariyushi FC | Saga |
| | | | | Stadium: Saga Stadium |

| 3 September 2011 EC 1R | Saga Lixil FC | 0–5 | FC Kagoshima | Kagoshima |
| | | | | Stadium: Shiranami Stadium |

| 29 August 2015 EC 1R | Saga Lixil FC | 0–2 | Oita Trinita | Oita |
| | | | | Stadium: Resonac Dome Oita |

| 27 May 2018 EC 1R | Saga Lixil FC | 0–3 | Tegevajaro Miyazaki | Saga |
| | | | | Stadium: Saga Stadium |

| 25 May 2019 EC 1R | Saga Lixil FC | 0–3 | Arterivo Wakayama | Wakayama |
| | | | | Stadium: Kimiidera Athletic Stadium |

| 22 May 2022 EC 1R | Brew Kashima | 0–2 | Kochi United | Tosu |
| | | | | Stadium: Ekimae Real Estate Stadium |

| 20 May 2023 EC 2R | Brew Kashima | 1–2 | Kamatamare Sanuki | Marugame |
| | | | | Stadium: Pikara Stadium |

== Players ==
=== Current squad ===
As of 23 August 2023.

Note: Flags indicate national team as defined under FIFA eligibility rules; some limited exceptions apply. Players may hold more than one non-FIFA nationality.

| No. | Pos. | Nation | Player |
|---|---|---|---|
| 1 | GK | (Japan) JPN | Kenshiro Maeda |
| 2 | DF | (Japan) JPN | Kazuki Higa |
| 3 | DF | (Japan) JPN | Kaede Migita |
| 4 | DF | (Japan) JPN | Reo Murata |
| 5 | DF | (Japan) JPN | Koshin Honda |
| 6 | MF | (Japan) JPN | Kosuke Yoshimura |
| 7 | MF | (Japan) JPN | Kei Aramaki |
| 8 | MF | (Japan) JPN | Daiki Suenaga |
| 9 | FW | (Japan) JPN | Soru Iwanaga |
| 10 | FW | (Japan) JPN | Shinichi Kawachi |
| 11 | FW | (Japan) JPN | Rui Morimoto |
| 12 | DF | (Japan) JPN | Yu Takada |

| No. | Pos. | Nation | Player |
|---|---|---|---|
| 13 | MF | (Japan) JPN | Kazuki Higa |
| 14 | MF | (Japan) JPN | Takumi Sunada |
| 15 | MF | (Japan) JPN | Yuya Yamaura |
| 16 | MF | (Japan) JPN | Kaito Arima |
| 18 | MF | (Japan) JPN | Kento Muranaka |
| 19 | DF | (Japan) JPN | Yu Hirai |
| 20 | MF | (Japan) JPN | Naoki Inomata |
| 21 | GK | (Japan) JPN | Kenta Isaka |
| 23 | MF | (Japan) JPN | Takemaru Hirakata |
| 24 | FW | (Japan) JPN | Soma Takebe |
| 25 | MF | (Japan) JPN | Seiya Nagatomi |
