= Kazushi Mitsuhira =

Japanese footballer (born 1988)

Kazushi Mitsuhira 三平 和司
Personal information
- Full name: Kazushi Mitsuhira
- Date of birth: January 13, 1988 (age 38)
- Place of birth: Hadano, Kanagawa, Japan
- Height: 1.75 m (5 ft 9 in)
- Position: Striker

Team information
- Current team: Ventforet Kofu
- Number: 9

Youth career
- 2003–2005: Hadono Minamigaoka High School

College career
Years	Team	Apps	(Gls)
2006–2009	Kanagawa University		

Senior career*
Years	Team	Apps	(Gls)
2008−2012	Shonan Bellmare	13	(2)
2011–2012	→ Oita Trinita (loan)	62	(19)
2013–2014	Kyoto Sanga	66	(15)
2015–2021	Oita Trinita	128	(26)
2021–	Ventforet Kofu	158	(28)
- * Club domestic league appearances and goals as of 17 August 2026

Kazushi Mitsuhira (三平 和司, Mitsuhira Kazushi; born January 13, 1988 in Hadano, Kanagawa) is a Japanese football player who plays as a striker for Ventforet Kofu.

A mainstay of the J2 League with over 340 league appearances, Mitsuhira scored the opening goal in the 2022 Emperor's Cup final, which he would later go on to win.

== Career ==
On 8 January 2015, Mitsuhira was announced at Oita Trinita on a permanent transfer.

On 30 December 2020, Mitsuhira was announced at Ventforet Kofu on a permanent transfer. On 16 October 2022, he scored in the 2022 Emperor's Cup final against Sanfrecce Hiroshima, as Ventforet Kofu went on to win the Emperor's Cup. On 15 September 2024, he made his 400th J League appearance against Yokohama FC.

== Style of play ==
Mitsuhira is known for his humorous personality and positive attitude.

== Career statistics ==
Update; end of the 2022 season.

Appearances and goals by club, season and competition
Club	Season	League			Emperor's Cup		J.League Cup		Total	
Club	Season	Division	Apps	Goals	Apps	Goals	Apps	Goals	Apps	Goals
Shonan Bellmare	2008	J2 League	4	1	0	0	—		4	1
Shonan Bellmare	2010	J1 League	9	1	2	1	6	1	17	3
Oita Trinita	2011	J2 League	23	5	1	0	—		24	5
Oita Trinita	2012	J2 League	39	14	0	0	—		39	14
Kyoto Sanga	2013	J2 League	38	7	2	2	—		40	9
Kyoto Sanga	2014	J2 League	28	8	1	0	—		29	8
Oita Trinita	2015	J2 League	30	4	1	0	—		31	4
Oita Trinita	2016	J3 League	15	10	0	0	—		15	10
Oita Trinita	2017	J2 League	33	5	0	0	—		33	5
Oita Trinita	2018	J2 League	30	10	0	0	—		30	10
Oita Trinita	2019	J1 League	17	4	3	2	4	1	24	7
Oita Trinita	2020	J1 League	18	3	0	0	2	0	20	3
Ventforet Kofu	2021	J2 League	25	3	1	0	—		26	3
Ventforet Kofu	2022	J2 League	33	7	4	4	—		40	8
Ventforet Kofu	2023	J2 League	0	0	0	0	0	0	0	0
Career total			342	82	15	9	12	2	369	93

== Honours ==
Ventforet Kofu

- Emperor's Cup: 2022
