= Yuzuki Yamato =

Japanese footballer

Yuzuki Yamato 大和 優槻
Personal information
- Full name: Yuzuki Yamato
- Date of birth: 16 July 2003 (age 23)
- Place of birth: Chiba, Japan
- Height: 1.87 m (6 ft 1 1/2 in)
- Position: Defender

Team information
- Current team: FC Ryukyu (on loan from Ventforet Kofu)
- Number: 22

Youth career
- 2007−2012: Kashiwa AATOR'82
- 2013−2021: Kashiwa Reysol

Senior career*
| Years | Team | Apps | (Gls) |
| 2022– | Ventforet Kofu | 7 | (0) |
| 2024 | → Iwate Grulla Morioka (loan) | 25 | (0) |
| 2025– | → FC Ryukyu (loan) | 9 | (0) |
- * Club domestic league appearances and goals as of 1 January 2026

Yuzuki Yamato (大和 優槻, Yamato Yuzuki; born 16 July 2003) is a Japanese professional footballer who plays as a defender for J3 League club FC Ryukyu on loan from Ventforet Kofu.

== Career ==
He played for Kashiwa Reysol youth teams from 2007 to 2021, who developed and observed him closely from childhood. He was the captain of Reysol's under-18 team. His professional career began in 2022 with Ventforet Kofu when he signed with them to play in their first-team. He made his debut for Ventforet Kofu on 15 May 2022 against Renofa Yamaguchi in the J2 League, being substituted on the 88th minute of the match. On 1 June 2022, less than one month after his J2 League debut, he had his first match as a starter for Ventforet Kofu in an Emperor's Cup tie against International Pacific University in the second round of the competition, playing the full 90 minutes in a Kofu's 5–1 win.

== Career statistics ==
=== Club ===
As of 16 May 2024.

| Club | Season | League | | | National Cup | | League Cup | | Continental | | Total | |
| Club | Season | Division | Apps | Goals | Apps | Goals | Apps | Goals | Apps | Goals | Apps | Goals |
|---|---|---|---|---|---|---|---|---|---|---|---|---|
| Ventforet Kofu | 2022 | J2 League | 7 | 0 | 3 (Note: Appearances in the Emperor's Cup) | 0 | – | | – | | 10 | 0 |
| Ventforet Kofu | 2023 | J2 League | 0 | 0 | 0 | 0 | – | | 0 | 0 | 0 | 0 |
| Iwate Grulla Morioka (loan) | 2024 | J3 League | 10 | 0 | 0 | 0 | 1 (Note: Appearances in the J.League Cup) | 0 | – | | 11 | 0 |
| Career total | | | 17 | 0 | 3 | 0 | 1 | 0 | 0 | 0 | 21 | 0 |
