= Kota Sugawara =

Japanese footballer

Personal information
- Date of birth: May 22, 1985 (age 41)
- Place of birth: Muroran, Hokkaido, Japan
- Height: 1.80 m (5 ft 11 in)
- Position: Forward

Team information
- Current team: Kochi United SC
- Number: 11

Youth career
- 2004–2007: Kokushikan University

Senior career*
Years	Team	Apps	(Gls)
2008–2010	Tokushima Vortis	35	(6)
2010	Grulla Morioka	13	(10)
2011–2012	MIO Biwako Shiga	17	(6)
2013	Zweigen Kanazawa	33	(11)
2014–2015	FC Osaka	10	(2)
2016–2018	Kochi United SC		(49)
- * Club domestic league appearances and goals as of 20 February 2016

Kota Sugawara (菅原 康太, Sugawara Kōta; born May 22, 1985) is a Japanese football player who played for Kochi United SC of the Shikoku Soccer League, scoring 49 goals in 3 seasons.

== Club statistics ==
Updated to 20 February 2016.

Club performance			League		Cup		Total	
Season	Club	League	Apps	Goals	Apps	Goals	Apps	Goals
Japan			League		Emperor's Cup		Total	
2004	Kokushikan University	JFL	18	6	0	0	18	6
2008	Tokushima Vortis	J2 League	18	4	1	0	19	4
2009	Tokushima Vortis	J2 League	17	2	1	0	18	2
2010	Grulla Morioka	JRL (Tohoku, Div. 1)	13	10	2	0	15	10
2011	MIO Biwako Kusatsu	JFL	17	6	-		17	6
2012	MIO Biwako Shiga	JFL	32	17	-		32	17
2013	Zweigen Kanazawa	JFL	33	11	3	2	36	13
2014	FC Osaka	JRL (Kansai, Div. 1)	2	0	0	0	2	0
2015	FC Osaka	JFL	8	2	0	0	8	2
Total			132	50	7	2	139	52
