= Kyoya Yamada =

Japanese footballer (born 2001)

Kyoya Yamada 山田 恭也
Personal information
- Date of birth: 29 July 2001 (age 25)
- Place of birth: Okayama, Japan
- Height: 1.77 m (5 ft 10 in)
- Position: Midfielder

Youth career
- Pinnacle Kurashiki FC
- 2017–2019: Fagiano Okayama

Senior career*
Years	Team	Apps	(Gls)
2020–2024	Fagiano Okayama	4	(0)
2022	→ Kōchi United SC (loan)	26	(1)
2024	→ Verspah Oita (loan)	1	(0)
Total		31	(1)
- * Club domestic league appearances and goals

Kyoya Yamada (山田 恭也, Yamada Kyōya; born 29 July 2001) is a Japanese former footballer who played as a midfielder.

== Early life and education ==
Yamada was born on 29 July 2001. He graduated high school at Okayama Gakugeikan High School.

== Career ==
On 19 August 2019, Yamada was promoted to the Fagiano Okayama first team from the 2020 season, where his father had played for previously. He made his league debut against Machida Zelvia on 5 May 2021.

On 3 March 2022, Yamada he Kochi United SC on an eight-month loan deal. On 12 December 2022, his loan expired and he returned to Fagiano Okayama.

On 10 January 2024, Yamada he Verspah Oita on a loan deal. He returned to Fagiano Okayama on 30 May 2024.

On 28 December 2024, Yamada announced his retirement from football. He ended his Fagiano Okayama career with four league matches played.

== Other ventures ==
In 2020, Yamada was appointed by the Okayama's Prefectural Election Commission as the "Special Public Relations Manager" in the Okayama Prefecture's gubernatorial election.

== Career statistics ==
Appearances and goals by club, season and competition
Club	Season	League			National cup		League cup		Total	
Club	Season	Division	Apps	Goals	Apps	Goals	Apps	Goals	Apps	Goals
Fagiano Okayama	2021	J2 League	2	0	1	0	0	0	3	0
Fagiano Okayama	2022	J2 League	0	0	0	0	0	0	0	0
Fagiano Okayama	2023	J2 League	2	0	2	0	0	0	4	0
Fagiano Okayama	2024	J2 League	0	0	1	0	0	0	1	0
Fagiano Okayama	Total		4	0	4	0	0	0	8	0
Kōchi United SC (loan)	2022	JFL	26	1	2	1	0	0	28	2
Verspah Oita (loan)	2024	JFL	1	0	0	0	0	0	1	0
Career total			31	1	6	1	0	0	37	2
