= Tsubasa Yokotake =

Japanese footballer

Tsubasa Yokotake 横竹 翔
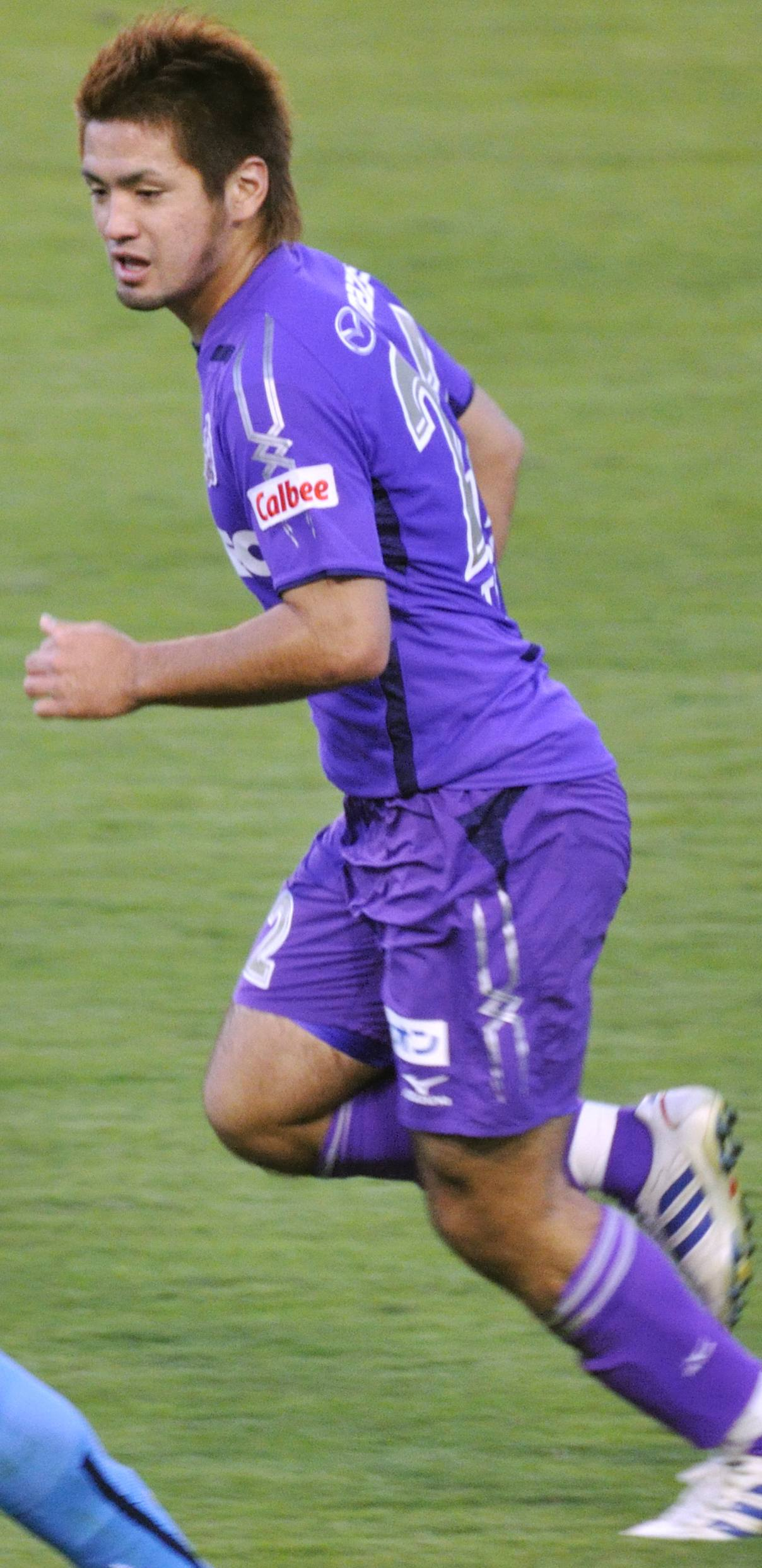
- Yokotake with Sanfrecce Hiroshima in 2010

Personal information
- Full name: Tsubasa Yokotake
- Date of birth: August 30, 1989 (age 37)
- Place of birth: Higashi-ku, Hiroshima, Japan
- Height: 1.77 m (5 ft 10 in)
- Position: Midfielder

Youth career
- 2005–2007: Sanfrecce Hiroshima

Senior career*
Years	Team	Apps	(Gls)
2008–2013	Sanfrecce Hiroshima	55	(0)
2013	→ Gainare Tottori (loan)	32	(1)
2014	Gainare Tottori	10	(0)
2015	Igosso Kochi	12	(3)
2016–2024	Kochi United	149	(22)
Medal record
Sanfrecce Hiroshima
Winner	J1 League	2012
Runner-up	J.League Cup	2010
- * Club domestic league appearances and goals

Tsubasa Yokotake (横竹 翔, Yokotake Tsubasa; born August 30, 1989) is a Japanese former football player.

== Club statistics ==
Updated to 20 February 2020.

Club performance			League		Cup		League Cup		Continental		Total	
Season	Club	League	Apps	Goals	Apps	Goals	Apps	Goals	Apps	Goals	Apps	Goals
Japan			League		Emperor's Cup		League Cup		Asia		Total	
2008	Sanfrecce Hiroshima	J2 League	0	0	0	0	-		-		0	0
2009	Sanfrecce Hiroshima	J1 League	16	0	1	0	4	1	-		21	1
2010	Sanfrecce Hiroshima	J1 League	27	0	2	1	4	0	5	0	38	1
2011	Sanfrecce Hiroshima	J1 League	12	0	2	1	2	0	–		38	1
2012	Sanfrecce Hiroshima	J1 League	0	0	0	0	2	0	–		2	0
2013	Gainare Tottori	J2 League	32	1	1	0	–		–		33	1
2014	Gainare Tottori	J3 League	10	0	0	0	–		–		10	0
2015	Igosso Kochi	JRL (Shikoku)	12	3	–		–		–		12	3
2016	Kochi United SC	JRL (Shikoku)	8	3	1	0	–		–		9	3
2017	Kochi United SC	JRL (Shikoku)	14	4	1	1	–		–		15	5
2018	Kochi United SC	JRL (Shikoku)	13	8	2	0	–		–		15	8
2019	Kochi United SC	JRL (Shikoku)	14	4	2	0	–		–		16	4
Career total			158	23	12	3	12	1	5	0	187	27
