= Takumi Hama =

Japanese footballer (born 1996)

Personal information
- Date of birth: 11 September 1996 (age 30)
- Place of birth: Yaizu, Shizuoka, Japan
- Height: 1.70 m (5 ft 7 in)
- Position: Midfielder

Team information
- Current team: Kochi United SC
- Number: 88

Youth career
- Otomi SSS
- Fujieda Meisei SC
- 2012–2014: Fujieda Meisei High School

College career
Years	Team	Apps	(Gls)
2015–2018	Niigata University of Management		

Senior career*
Years	Team	Apps	(Gls)
2019–2024	Azul Claro Numazu	152	(9)
2025	Kataller Toyama	26	(0)
2026–	Kochi United SC	18	(2)
- * Club domestic league appearances and goals as of 21 August 2026

Takumi Hama (濱 託巳, Hama Takumi; born 11 September 1996) is a Japanese footballer currently playing as a midfielder for Kochi United SC.

== Career ==
Takumi made his league debut for Azul against Blaublitz Akita on the 30 August 2019. He scored his first goal for the club against Vanraure Hachinohe on the 8 September 2019, scoring in the 30th minute.

== Career statistics ==
=== Club ===
As of 29 October 2020.

Club	Season	League			National Cup		League Cup		Other		Total	
Club	Season	Division	Apps	Goals	Apps	Goals	Apps	Goals	Apps	Goals	Apps	Goals
Azul Claro Numazu	2019	J3 League	13	2	0	0	–		0	0	13	2
Azul Claro Numazu	2020	J3 League	8	0	0	0	–		0	0	8	0
Azul Claro Numazu	2021	J3 League	12	1	0	0	–		0	0	12	1
Career total			33	3	0	0	0	0	0	0	33	3
