= Yuhi Takemoto =

Japanese footballer

Personal information
- Full name: Yuhi Takemoto
- Date of birth: 19 August 1997 (age 29)
- Place of birth: Hiroshima, Japan
- Height: 1.76 m (5 ft 9 in)
- Position: Midfielder

Team information
- Current team: Ehime FC
- Number: 22

Youth career
- Hatsukaichi FC
- –2015: Sanfrecce Hiroshima

College career
Years	Team	Apps	(Gls)
2016–2019	Ritsumeikan University		

Senior career*
Years	Team	Apps	(Gls)
2020–2025	Roasso Kumamoto	150	(12)
2026–	Ehime FC	22	(2)
- * Club domestic league appearances and goals as of 17 August 2026

Yuhi Takemoto (竹本 雄飛, Takemoto Yuhi; born 19 August 1997) is a Japanese footballer currently playing as a midfielder for Ehime FC.

== Career statistics ==
=== Club ===
As of 1 April 2021.

Club	Season	League			National Cup		League Cup		Other		Total	
Club	Season	Division	Apps	Goals	Apps	Goals	Apps	Goals	Apps	Goals	Apps	Goals
Ritsumeikan University	2019	–			2 (Note: Appearances in the Emperor's Cup)	0	–		0	0	2	0
Roasso Kumamoto	2020	J3 League	3	0	0	0	–		0	0	3	0
Roasso Kumamoto	2021	J3 League	1	0	0	0	–		0	0	1	0
Roasso Kumamoto	Total		4	0	0	0	0	0	0	0	4	0
Career total			4	0	2	0	0	0	0	0	6	0
