= Yutaro Hakamata =

Japanese footballer

Yutaro Hakamata 袴田 裕太郎
Personal information
- Date of birth: 24 June 1996 (age 30)
- Place of birth: Shizuoka, Japan
- Height: 1.83 m (6 ft 0 in)
- Position: Left back

Team information
- Current team: Roasso Kumamoto (on loan from Tokyo Verdy)
- Number: 16

Youth career
- 2003–2008: Shirawaki SSS
- 2009–2011: Júbilo Iwata
- 2012–2014: Hamamatsu Kaiseikan High School

College career
Years	Team	Apps	(Gls)
2015–2018	Meiji University		

Senior career*
Years	Team	Apps	(Gls)
2019–2021	Yokohama FC	69	(2)
2022–2023	Júbilo Iwata	2	(0)
2022–2023	→ Omiya Ardija (loan)	46	(7)
2024–	Tokyo Verdy	6	(0)
2025–	→ Roasso Kumamoto (loan)	38	(1)
- * Club domestic league appearances and goals as of 1 January 2025

Yutaro Hakamata (袴田 裕太郎, Hakamata Yutaro; born 24 June 1996) is a Japanese professional footballer who plays as a left back for J2 League club Roasso Kumamoto, on loan from Tokyo Verdy.

== Club statistics ==
As of end of 2024 season

Appearances and goals by club, season and competition
Club	Season	League			National cup		League cup		Other		Total	
Club	Season	Division	Apps	Goals	Apps	Goals	Apps	Goals	Apps	Goals	Apps	Goals
Japan			League		Emperor's Cup		J. League Cup		Other		Total	
Yokohama FC	2019	J2 League	14	0	2	0	-		-		16	0
Yokohama FC	2020	J1 League	27	0	0	0	0	0	-		27	0
Yokohama FC	2021	J1 League	28	2	0	0	4	0	-		32	2
Yokohama FC	Total		69	2	2	0	4	0	0	0	75	2
Júbilo Iwata	2022	J1 League	2	0	3	0	4	0	-		9	0
Omiya Ardija (loan)	2022	J2 League	14	4	0	0	-		-		14	4
Omiya Ardija (loan)	2023	J2 League	32	3	0	0	-		-		32	3
Omiya Ardija (loan)	Total		46	7	0	0	0	0	0	0	46	7
Tokyo Verdy	2024	J1 League	6	0	1	2	1	0	-		9	2
Career total			123	9	6	2	9	0	0	0	139	11
