= Daichi Soga =

Japanese footballer

Daichi Soga 曽我 大地
Personal information
- Full name: Daichi Soga
- Date of birth: March 10, 1998 (age 28)
- Place of birth: Fukuyama, Hiroshima, Japan
- Height: 1.70 m (5 ft 7 in)
- Position: Defender

Team information
- Current team: Gainare Tottori
- Number: 25

Youth career
- 2013–2015: Gainare Tottori

Senior career*
Years	Team	Apps	(Gls)
2015–2018	Gainare Tottori	12	(0)
2019	Tiamo Hirakata	9	(0)
2020–2023	Fukuyama City	41	(6)
2024–	Gainare Tottori	60	(1)
- * Club domestic league appearances and goals as of 1 January 2026

Daichi Soga (曽我 大地, Soga Daichi; born March 10, 1998, in Fukuyama, Hiroshima) is a Japanese football player for Gainare Tottori.

== Club statistics ==
Updated to 23 February 2018.

Club performance			League		Cup		Total	
Season	Club	League	Apps	Goals	Apps	Goals	Apps	Goals
Japan			League		Emperor's Cup		Total	
2015	Gainare Tottori	J3 League	2	0	0	0	2	0
2016	Gainare Tottori	J3 League	7	0	0	0	7	0
2017	Gainare Tottori	J3 League	3	0	0	0	3	0
Career total			12	0	0	0	12	0
