= Kochi United SC =

Football club based in, Kōchi, Japan

Kōchi United 高知ユナイテッド
- Full name: Kōchi United Sports Club
- Founded: 2016; 10 years ago
- Stadium: Kochi Haruno Sports Ground (Kōchi Haruno Athletic Stadium); Haruno, Kōchi
- Capacity: 16,010
- Chairman: Shigekazu Takemasa
- Manager: Takafumi Yoshimoto
- League: J3 League
- 2025: J3 League, 18th of 20
- Website: kochi-usc.jp
Home colours	Away colours

Kōchi United Sports Club, (高知ユナイテッドスポーツクラブ, Kōchi Yunaiteddo Supōtsukurabu) commonly known as Kōchi United SC (高知ユナイテッドSC, Kōchi Yunaiteddo Esushī) is a football club based in Kōchi, the capital city of Kōchi Prefecture in Japan. They currently play in the J3 League for the 2025 season, the third tier of Japanese professional football, after promotion from the JFL in 2024.

== History ==
=== Merger into current club ===
On 1 February 2016, two established Shikoku League clubs; Igosso Kochi FC (アイゴッソ高知FC) and Kochi U Torastar FC (高知UトラスターFC) merged to form one club, whose aim was to be the first team from Kōchi Prefecture to play in the J.League. After officially changing the management company's name to Kōchi United Sports Club Ltd., Kochi United SC took Igosso Kōchi FC's place in the Shikoku League. For the many players at Kōchi U Torastar FC unable to join Kochi United SC, and wanting to continue playing as amateurs in the Shikoku League, Kochi Sports Club Ltd. and Kochi University established KUFC Nangoku on March 1, 2016, and this new club took Kōchi U Torastar FC's place in the Shikoku League.

The club badge depicts the ceremonial Keshō-mawashi (化粧廻し) of a Tosa Fighting Dog on the outside, with the dark red colors of Igosso Kochi FC and the green of Kōchi U Torastar inside it and an image of a leaping bonito or skipjack tuna drawn in the center (a popular fish in Kochi prefecture). The club's home shirt also reflects the colors of the amalgamated teams from which Kochi United SC was formed.

=== Shikoku League (2016–2019) ===
They played in the Shikoku Soccer League, one of the Japanese Regional Leagues from 2016 to 2019, winning it three times in a row from 2017 to 2019.

In 2019, they finished 2nd in the Japanese Regional Football League Competition, earning promotion to the Japan Football League for the first time in their history from the 2020 season.

=== JFL (2020–2024) ===
In their first season in the JFL, Kochi United finished in 14th place.

On 24 September 2024, Kochi United announced they had been officially granted a J3 License after approval from the J. League Board of Directors.

On 7 December 2024, Kochi United secured promotion to J3 League for the first time in their history from the 2025 season after defeating YSCC Yokohama 0-2 in the 2nd leg of the J3/JFL play-offs thus winning 1-3 on aggregate, so ending five years in the fourth tier.

=== J. League (2025–) ===
Kochi United officially played their first J3 League game away against newly relegated, Tochigi SC on 16 February 2025 which they lost 1-0. Their first home game was against Gainare Tottori on 23 February 2025, which ended in a 0-0 draw. In their 3rd match at home to FC Osaka, Kokoro Kobayashi scored their first ever J-League goal in a 1-2 loss. On March 9, 2025, Kochi United secured their first ever win in the J-League with a 2-1 away victory against Zweigen Kanazawa. It would take until August however for Kochi to record their first home win in J3, with a 3-2 victory over Nara Club. In a tumultuous first season, including claims of "power harassment" (resulting in both head-coach Akita Yutaka and CEO leaving the club), losing their star player Kokoro Kobayashi to Vegalta Sendai on a free transfer mid-season, and a terrible run of only 2 wins in 16 games, Kochi ended up 3rd from bottom of the league with 10 wins 8 draws and 20 defeats, thus surviving their first season in the J-League.

== Club seasons (Pre-JFL) ==
=== 2016 ===
In their inaugural 2016 season, they finished runners-up in the Shikoku League (W12-D1-L1) to FC Imabari (FC今治). They also qualified for the All Japan Senior Football Championship (全国社会人サッカー選手権大会 Zenkoku Shakaijin Sakkā Senshuken Taikai), but lost 4–3 in the first round to eventual winners Mitsubishi Mizushima FC (三菱水島 FC). In addition, they represented Kōchi in the Emperor's Cup (天皇杯 Tennōhai) breaking Kochi University's 13-year streak, but lost 2–1 in the first round proper to V-Varen Nagasaki (V・ファーレン長崎) of the J2 League having taken a shock lead with a Kota Sugawara penalty. Takuya Kobayashi was the top goalscorer with 17 goals in all competitions.

=== 2017 ===
In the 2017 season, they won the Shikoku League with a W12-D2-L0 record, thus qualifying for the Japanese Regional Football League Competition (全国地域サッカーチャンピオンズリーグ Zenkoku Chiiki Sakkā Championzu Līgu). They were drawn in Group B for the tournament alongside Amitie SC Kyoto (now Ococias Kyoto AC おこしやす京都AC), FC TIAMO Hirakata (FCティアモ枚方) of the Kansai Soccer League, and Mitsubishi Mizushima FC of the Chūgoku Soccer League. They lost 1–0 against Kansai Champions Amitie SC Kyoto in their first match but won their second game 2–1 against FC TIAMO Hirakata. In their final match, they thrashed Mitsubishi Mizushima (6 times Chugoku League champions) 5–2, but it wasn't enough to win the group or qualify for the final stage as best runners-up. Still, it was a fine overall performance in their first appearance in the tournament. In the Emperor's Cup they represented Kochi again, but went out in the first round proper for the second consecutive season, losing 2–1 to Verspah Oita (ヴェルスパ大分) of the Japan Football League, after leading with a Tsubasa Yokotake goal. In the All Japan Senior Football Championship first round, they led at halftime but ended up losing 3–1 to Vonds Ichihara (VONDS市原). The top scorer for the season was Kota Sugawara with 23 goals in all competitions.

=== 2018 ===
In the 2018 season, they retained their Shikoku League title despite one loss to FC Tokushima and won the Kochi Prefectural Football Championship again with a 3–0 win against KUFC Nangoku in the final. In the first round proper of the Emperor's Cup, they defeated Mitsubishi Mizushima FC 2–0 at home, then faced Albirex Niigata (アルビレックス新潟) of the J2 League away in the second round. After a 0–0 draw at Denka Big Swan Stadium, one of the venues for the 2002 World Cup, they lost 5–3 on penalties in front of 2241 fans. In the All Japan Senior Football Championship, they lost 3–0 away in the first round to Suzuka Unlimited FC (鈴鹿アンリミテッドFC). Finally, in the season-ending Japanese Regional Football League Competition they disappointingly lost all three matches in the group stages against Blancdieu Hirosaki FC: 3–2, Hokkaido Tokachi Sky Earth: 3-0 and FC Kariya: 2-1 respectively. The joint top scorers in all competitions were Kazuki Nakabayashi and Ryo Taguchi with 16 goals.

=== 2019 ===
The 2019 season was a breakthrough season for Kochi United. They won the Shikoku League for the third straight season with a 100% record and retained the Kochi Prefectural Football Championship, though they needed an extra-time winner to beat KUFC Nangoku in the final. In the first round proper they defeated MD Nagasaki (MD長崎) at home 1–0 in front of over 400 fans but lost 2–1 away after extra time to V-Varen Nagasaki of J2 in the second round. They failed to qualify for the first round proper of the All Japan Senior Football Championship after losing in the regional playoffs to FC Tokushima. However, in the Japanese Regional Football League Competition, their luck changed. With home advantage in the group stages, they beat Blancdieu Hirosaki FC 2–1 in their opening group game. In their second match, they thrashed SRC Hiroshima 7–0 and although they lost the final group game 2–0 to Ococias Kyoto AC, they still qualified for the final round. Things didn't look good when they lost the first game of the final stage 3–0 to Iwaki FC, but they responded well in the second match with a 3–1 victory over Fukui United FC. That meant they went into a winner-takes-all final match against Ococias Kyoto who they had lost to earlier on in the competition. This time, they emerged victorious with a stunning 3–1 win to get their revenge and finish second in the competition, thus earning promotion to the Japan Football League; the first time a team from Kochi had achieved that feat.

== League and Cup record ==
League											Emperor's Cup	J.League Cup	AJSFC	RFCL	Top Goalscorer (All Competitions)
Season	Division	Pos.	P	W	D	L	F	A	GD	Pts	Emperor's Cup	J.League Cup	AJSFC	RFCL	Top Goalscorer (All Competitions)
2016	Shikoku Soccer League	2nd	14	12	1	1	70	6	64	37	1st round	Not eligible	1st round	Did not qualify	Takuya Kobayashi (17)
2017	Shikoku Soccer League	1st	14	12	2	0	83	5	78	38	1st round	Not eligible	1st round	Group stages	Kota Sugawara (23)
2018	Shikoku Soccer League	1st	14	12	1	1	80	6	74	37	2nd round	Not eligible	1st round	Group stages	Kazuki Nakabayashi / Ryo Taguchi (16)
2019	Shikoku Soccer League	1st	14	14	0	0	92	4	88	42	2nd round	Not eligible	Did not qualify	2nd	Ryo Taguchi (19)
2020	JFL	14th	15	4	4	7	17	26	-9	16	4th round	Not eligible	Ineligible		Kaima Akahoshi (9)
2021	JFL	13th	32	9	6	17	30	49	-19	33	2nd round	Not eligible	Ineligible		Yuta Nishimura (9)
2022	JFL	11th	30	9	7	14	30	39	-9	34	2nd round	Not eligible	Ineligible		Kaima Akahoshi (11)
2023	JFL	7th	28	10	8	10	30	26	+4	38	Round of 16	Not eligible	Ineligible		Kokoro Kobayashi (9)
2024	JFL	2nd	30	16	7	7	36	22	+14	55	2nd round	Not eligible	Ineligible		Kokoro Kobayashi (10)
2025	J3	18th	38	10	8	20	40	60	-20	38	2nd round	1st round	Ineligible		Kokoro Kobayashi (11)
2026	J3	16th	18	8	4	6	23	21	+2	30	N/A	N/A	Ineligible		Masaki Shintani (5)
2026-27	J3	TBD	38								TBD	TBD	Ineligible		

Key

- Pos. = Position in league; P = Games played; W = Games won; D = Games drawn; L = Games lost; F = Goals scored; A = Goals conceded; GD = Goal difference; Pts = Points gained
- Source: J.League Data Site

== Current squad ==
As of 1 August 2026.

Note: Flags indicate national team as defined under FIFA eligibility rules; some limited exceptions apply. Players may hold more than one non-FIFA nationality.

No.	Pos.	Nation	Player
1	GK	JPN	Raisei Ono
3	DF	JPN	Konosuke Fukumiya
4	DF	JPN	Daichi Kobayashi
5	DF	JPN	Rio Tadokoro (on loan from V-Varen Nagasaki)
6	MF	JPN	Kanta Sakagishi (on loan from Iwaki FC)
7	MF	JPN	Asahi Kanehara
8	MF	JPN	Yuui Takano
10	MF	JPN	Taiga Sasaki
11	MF	JPN	Rinta Miyoshi
13	FW	JPN	Atsushi Kawata
14	MF	JPN	Genya Sekino
15	DF	JPN	Hikaru Sakamoto (on loan from Iwaki FC)
16	MF	JPN	Shosei Kozuki
17	GK	JPN	Kosuke Inose
18	FW	JPN	Kakeru Aoto
19	FW	NGR	Origbaajo Ismaila
20	FW	JPN	Reo Sugiyama

No.	Pos.	Nation	Player
21	GK	JPN	Riku Nagata
22	DF	JPN	Ryuta Fujimori
23	DF	JPN	Daichi Matsumoto
24	MF	JPN	Hibiki Okazawa
26	DF	JPN	Kazutaka Asano
28	FW	JPN	Aoto Nanamure
30	DF	JPN	Yutaro Kato
31	MF	JPN	Manato Kudo (on loan from Vegalta Sendai)
33	FW	JPN	Hayate Cho
39	DF	JPN	Kyowaan Hoshi
44	MF	JPN	Yoshihiro Shimoda (on loan from Kashima Antlers)
73	MF	JPN	Tanaka Toshiya
76	MF	JPN	Yuta Mikado
77	MF	JPN	Josei Sato (on loan from Oita Trinita)
88	DF	JPN	Takumi Hama
99	GK	JPN	Yudai Murata

== Coaching staff ==
As of 2024 season.

Position	Staff
Manager	(Japan) Takahisa Shiraishi
Assistant manager	(Japan) Masahiro Tateda
Goalkeeper coach	(Japan) Takahiro Nakamoto
Trainer	(Japan) Ikki Motegi
Physical trainer	(Japan) Midori Horri
Competent	(Japan) Yusuke Hata
General manager	(Japan) Akihiro Nishimura

== Managerial history (All Comps.) ==
Manager	Nationality	Tenure		League Managerial Record				
Manager	Nationality	Start	Finish	P	W	D	L	W%
Akihiro Nishimura	Japan	1 February 2016	31 December 2016	23	18	1	4	78.26
Takefumi Otani	Japan	1 February 2017	31 January 2020	77	61	3	13	79.22
Akihiro Nishimura	Japan	1 February 2020	31 January 2022	53	18	9	26	33.96
Takafumi Yoshimoto	Japan	1 February 2022	31 January 2025	101	44	23	34	43.56
Yutaka Akita	Japan	1 February 2025	10 September 2025 (Susp. 29 June)	22	7	7	8	31.82
Takuya Jinno (Interim)	Japan	30 June 2025	10 September 2025	8	2	1	5	25.00
Masahiro Tatsuta (Interim)	Japan	10 September 2025	22 September 2025	2	0	0	2	0.00
Takahisa Shiraishi	Japan	23 September 2025	24 December 2025	10	2	1	7	20.00
Takafumi Yoshimoto	Japan	24 December 2025	8 June 2026	20	8	4	8	40.00

== Honours ==
Kochi United honours
Honour	No.	Years
Kochi Prefectural Football Championship Emperor's Cup Kochi Prefectural Qualifiers	10	2016, 2017, 2018, 2019, 2020, 2021, 2022, 2023, 2024, 2025
Shikoku Soccer League	3	2017, 2018, 2019
J3/JFL Play-off winner	1	2024

== Statistics ==
=== All-time competitive record table ===
Updated end of 2026 J2/J3 competition

Opponent	Pld	W	D	L	GF	GA	GD
Albirex Niigata	3	1	1	1	4	3	+1
Aso FC	1	1	0	0	12	0	+12
Atletico Suzuka	10	2	2	6	10	18	-8
Azul Claro Numazu	2	0	0	2	0	5	-5
Belugarosso Iwami	2	2	0	0	3	1	+2
Blancdieu Hirosaki	2	1	0	1	4	4	0
Brew Kashima	1	1	0	0	2	0	+2
Briobecca Urayasu Ichikawa	4	3	1	0	7	3	+4
Criacao Shinjuku	6	4	1	1	7	2	+5
Ehime FC	2	0	0	2	0	2	-2
Fukui United FC	1	1	0	0	3	1	+2
Fukushima United FC	2	2	0	0	5	3	+2
Gainare Tottori	2	0	1	1	0	1	-1
Gamba Osaka	2	1	0	1	3	3	0
FC Gifu	2	0	1	1	2	4	-2
Giravanz Kitakyushu	2	2	0	0	5	2	+3
Hisaeda FC	2	2	0	0	15	0	+15
Hokkaido Tokachi Sky Earth	1	0	0	1	0	3	-3
Honda FC	9	3	2	4	6	13	-7
FC Imabari	4	2	0	2	6	4	+2
Iwaki FC	4	0	1	3	5	10	-5
Kagoshima United	2	0	1	1	3	6	-3
Kagura Shimane	6	2	0	4	4	11	-7
Kamatamare Sanuki	6	5	0	1	10	5	+5
FC Kariya	3	0	0	3	3	8	-5
Kataller Toyama	2	1	0	1	3	5	-2
Kawasaki Frontale	1	0	0	1	0	1	-1
Kochi University	5	5	0	0	11	4	+7
Koyo Sealing Techno Soccer Club	7	7	0	0	67	1	+66
KUFC Nankoku	14	14	0	0	50	7	+43
Kyoto Sanga	1	0	0	1	1	3	-2
Llamas Kochi	11	11	0	0	61	2	+59
Maruyasu Okazaki	9	3	3	3	12	14	-4
MD Nagasaki	1	1	0	0	1	0	+1
Matsumoto Yamaga	2	1	0	1	5	1	+4
Minebea Mitsumi	9	3	1	3	7	4	+3
Mitsubishi Mizushima	9	5	1	3	15	11	+4
Nagano Parceiro	2	2	0	0	2	0	+2
Nakamura Club	2	2	0	0	14	0	+14
Nara Club	9	2	3	4	6	11	-5
Niisho Club	6	6	0	0	48	0	+48
Nippon Steel & Sumitomo Metal Oita Soccer Club	1	1	0	0	3	1	+2
Ococias Kyoto	3	1	0	2	3	4	-1
Okinawa SV	4	1	1	2	1	3	-2
Omiya Ardija	1	0	0	1	1	2	-1
FC Osaka	9	1	2	6	9	13	-4
Reilac Shiga	9	1	4	4	6	7	-2
ReinMeer Aomori	9	3	3	3	7	8	-1
Renofa Yamaguchi FC	1	0	0	1	2	3	-1
Rossorise KFC	4	4	0	0	26	1	+25
FC RSG	1	1	0	0	10	0	+10
R.Velho Takamatsu	9	9	0	0	56	0	+56
FC Ryukyu	2	0	1	1	2	3	-1
SC Sagamihara	2	0	1	1	0	1	-1
Sagan Tosu	1	0	0	1	1	2	-1
Showa Club	1	1	0	0	6	0	+6
Sony Sendai	9	3	4	2	12	10	+2
SRC Hiroshima	1	1	0	0	7	0	+7
Tadotsu FC	9	8	1	0	55	4	+51
Takamatsu University	1	1	0	0	2	1	+1
Tegevajaro Miyazaki	3	0	0	3	3	7	-4
Thespa Gunma	2	0	1	1	2	3	-1
Tiamo Hirakata	9	4	3	2	10	8	+2
Tochigi City FC	4	1	0	3	3	12	-9
Tochigi SC	2	0	0	2	0	2	-2
FC Tokushima	11	6	3	2	35	10	+25
Tokushima Vortis	3	1	0	2	3	6	-3
Yokogawa Musashino	9	4	2	3	11	7	+4
Tsukuba University	1	0	0	1	2	3	-1
Vanraure Hachinohe	2	0	1	1	2	3	-1
Verspah Oita	10	3	1	6	8	10	-2
Veertien Mie	9	6	1	2	16	8	+8
Vonds Ichihara	1	0	0	1	1	3	-2
V-Varen Nagasaki	2	0	0	2	2	4	-2
Vissel Kobe	1	0	0	1	1	4	-3
Yokohama FC	1	1	0	0	1	0	+1
YSCC Yokohama	2	1	1	0	3	1	+2
Zweigen Kanazawa	4	2	1	1	6	6	0

=== All-time top ten record goalscorers ===
Updated to 2025 season

Name	Ranking	Active	League	Cup	Other	Total	Hat-tricks
Hiroki Maehara	1	2016-2020	37	16	4	57	5
Ryo Taguchi	2	2017-2020	39	12	2	53	5
Kota Sugawara	3	2016-2018	35	13	1	49	5
Kokoro Kobayashi	4	2023-2025	26	4	0	30	1
Tsubasa Yokotake	5	2016-2024	22	6	2	30	0
Kaima Akahoshi	6	2020-2022	21	4	0	25	0
Kazuki Nakabayashi	7	2017-2018	13	11	1	25	1
Yuta Nishimura	8	2019-2023	17	5	1	23	0
On Byung-Hoon	9	2016-2018	13	10	0	23	0
Kai Murakami	10	2017-2019	14	7	0	21	0

== Kit evolution ==
Home 1st
2016 - 2019	2020	2021	2022	2023
2024	2025	2026 -		

Away 2nd
2016 - 2019	2020	2021	2022	2023
2024	2025	2026 -		

== Records ==
- Record home victory: 11-0 v Rossorise KFC (Emperor's Cup Regional Round, 2017) & v Koyo Sealing Techno (Shikoku Soccer League, 2019).
- Record away victory: 0-14 v Koyo Sealing Techno (Shikoku Soccer League 2019).
- Record away defeat: 5-0 v Honda FC (JFL 2021).
- Record home defeat: 0-5 v Tochigi City FC (J3 2025).
- Longest winning streak (all comps): 13 games (2017–18 and 2019 season).
- Longest losing streak (all comps): 7 games (JFL 2022-23). Longest losing streak in the same season: 6 games (J3 2025).
- Most goals by one player in a game: 4 (Takuya Kobayashi: SSL 2016, Kazuki Nakabayashi: AJSFC 2017, Paulo Sousa: SSL 2018, Ryo Taguchi: SSL 2019, Hiroki Maehara: SSL 2019).
- Most career goals for Kochi United SC: 57 (Hiroki Maehara).
- Most hat-tricks for Kochi United SC: 5 (Kota Sugawara, Ryo Taguchi, Hiroki Maehara).
- Record home attendance: 11,085 v Verspah Oita (JFL 2024).
