= Shota Kaneko =

Japanese footballer (born 1995)

Shota Kaneko 金子 翔太
Personal information
- Full name: Shota Kaneko
- Date of birth: 2 May 1995 (age 31)
- Place of birth: Shizuoka City, Japan
- Height: 1.63 m (5 ft 4 in)
- Position: Winger

Team information
- Current team: Matsumoto Yamaga FC
- Number: 11

Youth career
- –2007: Imaichi Daisan Carnaval
- 2008–2013: JFA Academy Fukushima

Senior career*
Years	Team	Apps	(Gls)
2014–2021	Shimizu S-Pulse	157	(24)
2015	→ Tochigi SC (loan)	5	(1)
2014–2015	→ J. League U-22 (loan)	18	(3)
2021–2025	Júbilo Iwata	83	(11)
2025–2026	Fujieda MYFC	31	(1)
2026–	Matsumoto Yamaga FC	3	(1)

International career
2014	Japan U19	3	(0)
- * Club domestic league appearances and goals as of 24 August 2026

Shota Kaneko (金子 翔太, Kaneko Shōta; born 2 May 1995) is a Japanese professional footballer who plays as a winger for Matsumoto Yamaga FC.

== Career statistics ==
Updated to 18 February 2019.

Appearances and goals by club, season and competition
Club	Season	League			Emperor's Cup		J.League Cup		Total	
Club	Season	Division	Apps	Goals	Apps	Goals	Apps	Goals	Apps	Goals
Shimizu S-Pulse	2014	J1 League	2	0	1	0	2	0	5	0
Shimizu S-Pulse	2015	J1 League	5	0	0	0	0	0	5	0
Tochigi SC	2015	J2 League	5	1	1	0	–		6	1
Shimizu S-Pulse	2016	J2 League	22	4	4	2	–		26	6
Shimizu S-Pulse	2017	J1 League	26	4	3	0	4	1	33	5
Shimizu S-Pulse	2018	J1 League	34	10	2	0	0	0	36	10
Career total			94	19	11	2	6	1	111	22
