= Toma Murata =

Japanese footballer

Toma Murata 村田 透馬
Personal information
- Full name: Toma Murata
- Date of birth: July 22, 2000 (age 26)
- Place of birth: Osaka, Japan
- Height: 1.73 m (5 ft 8 in)
- Position: Forward

Team information
- Current team: Yokohama FC
- Number: 20

Youth career
- Fukai FC
- Gamba Osaka
- 2016–2018: Kokoku High School

Senior career*
Years	Team	Apps	(Gls)
2018–2023	FC Gifu	94	(7)
2024–	Yokohama FC	56	(3)
- * Club domestic league appearances and goals as of 14 August 2026

Toma Murata (村田 透馬, Murata Tōma; born July 22, 2000) is a Japanese football player who currently plays for Yokohama FC.

== Early life ==
Toma was born in Osaka.

== Playing career ==
Murata was born in Osaka Prefecture on July 22, 2000. He joined J2 League club FC Gifu in 2018. He made his debut for Gifu against Kyoto Sanga on the 11 August 2018. He scored his first goal for Gifu against Kamatamare Sanuki on the 28 March 2021, scoring in the 64th minute.
