= Yuji Kajikawa =

Japanese footballer

Yuji Kajikawa 梶川裕嗣
Personal information
- Full name: Yuji Kajikawa
- Date of birth: 26 July 1991 (age 35)
- Place of birth: Toyota, Aichi, Japan
- Height: 1.85 m (6 ft 1 in)
- Position: Goalkeeper

Team information
- Current team: Kashima Antlers
- Number: 29

Youth career
- 1998–1999: Komaba SC
- 2000–2006: Nagoya Grampus
- 2007–2009: Tokai Gakuen High School

College career
Years	Team	Apps	(Gls)
2010–2013	Tokai Gakuen University		

Senior career*
Years	Team	Apps	(Gls)
2014–2017	Shonan Bellmare	2	(0)
2017	→ Tokushima Vortis (loan)	14	(0)
2018–2019	Tokushima Vortis	76	(0)
2020–2021	Yokohama F. Marinos	17	(0)
2022–2023	Júbilo Iwata	16	(0)
2024–	Kashima Antlers	3	(0)
- * Club domestic league appearances and goals as of 9 August 2026

Yuji Kajikawa (梶川裕嗣, Kajikawa, Yuji; born 26 July 1991 in Toyota, Aichi) is a Japanese professional footballer who plays as a goalkeeper for J1 League club Kashima Antlers.

== University career ==
At university, Kajikawa was named in the Best 11 in the Tokai Student League.

== Career ==
=== Shonan Bellmare ===
On 7 November 2013, the club announced that Kajikawa would be joining the team from the 2014 season. On 31 August 2015, the club announced that he would spend 6 months out following a right hamstring injury. Kajikawa made his league debut against Ventforet Kofu on 29 October 2016.

=== Loan to Tokushima Vortis ===
In 2017, Kajikawa joined Tokushima Vortis on loan. During his loan spell, he made his league debut for Tokushima Vortis against Tokyo Verdy on 26 February 2017.

=== Tokushima Vortis ===
During his permanent spell, Kajikawa made his league debut against Fagiano Okayama on 25 February 2018.

=== Yokohama F.Marinos ===
On 24 December 2019, Kajikawa was announced at Yokohama F. Marinos. He made his league debut against Urawa Red Diamonds on 4 July 2020.

=== Júbilo Iwata ===
On 27 December 2021, Kajikawa was announced at Júbilo Iwata. He made his league debut against Shonan Bellmare on 30 July 2022.

=== Kashima Antlers ===
On 28 December 2023, Kajikawa was announced at Kashima Antlers. On 23 June 2024, he suffered a right triceps surae injury during training.

== Club statistics ==
As of end of 2023 season

Appearances and goals by club, season and competition
Club	Season	League			National cup		League cup		Continental		Other		Total	
Club	Season	Division	Apps	Goals	Apps	Goals	Apps	Goals	Apps	Goals	Apps	Goals	Apps	Goals
Japan			League		Emperor's Cup		J. League Cup		Asia		Other		Total	
Shonan Bellmare	2014	J2 League	0	0	1	0	–		–		–		1	0
Shonan Bellmare	2015	J1 League	0	0	0	0	0	0	–		–		0	0
Shonan Bellmare	2016	J1 League	2	0	0	0	2	0	–		–		4	0
Shonan Bellmare	Total		2	0	1	0	2	0	0	0	0	0	5	0
Tokushima Vortis (loan)	2017	J2 League	14	0	1	0	–		–		–		15	0
Tokushima Vortis	2018	J2 League	35	0	1	0	–		–		–		36	0
Tokushima Vortis	2019	J2 League	41	0	0	0	–		–		3 (Note: J1/J2 Play-offs)	0	44	0
Tokushima Vortis	Total		90	0	2	0	0	0	0	0	3	0	95	0
Yokohama F. Marinos	2020	J1 League	17	0	0	0	1	0	2	0	–		20	0
Yokohama F. Marinos	2021	J1 League	0	0	1	0	4	0	–		–		5	0
Yokohama F. Marinos	Total		17	0	1	0	5	0	2	0	0	0	25	0
Júbilo Iwata	2022	J1 League	3	0	2	0	3	0	–		–		8	0
Júbilo Iwata	2023	J2 League	13	0	2	0	2	0	–		–		17	0
Júbilo Iwata	Total		16	0	4	0	5	0	0	0	0	0	25	0
Kashima Antlers	2024	J1 League	0	0	0	0	0	0	–		–		0	0
Total			125	0	8	0	12	0	2	0	3	0	150	0

== Honours ==
=== Club ===
Kashima Antlers

- J1 League: 2025
