= Yosuke Furukawa =

Japanese footballer

Personal information
- Date of birth: 16 July 2003 (age 23)
- Place of birth: Otsu, Shiga, Japan
- Height: 1.74 m (5 ft 9 in)
- Position: Midfielder

Team information
- Current team: Darmstadt 98
- Number: 44

Youth career
- Azul FC
- –2018: Kyoto Sanga
- 2019–2021: Shizuoka Gakuen High School

Senior career*
Years	Team	Apps	(Gls)
2022–2025	Júbilo Iwata	59	(4)
2024–2025	→ Górnik Zabrze (loan)	24	(2)
2025–	Darmstadt 98	13	(2)
- * Club domestic league appearances and goals as of 18 May 2026

Yosuke Furukawa (古川 陽介, Furukawa Yosuke; born 16 July 2003) is a Japanese professional footballer who plays as a midfielder for 2. Bundesliga club Darmstadt 98.

== Career ==
Born in Shiga Prefecture, Furukawa started his career with local side Azul FC before moving to professional team Kyoto Sanga.

In late 2021, it was announced that Furukawa would sign for J1 League side Júbilo Iwata ahead of the 2022 season. He played in a 10–1 friendly victory against Iwate Grulla Morioka on 24 January 2022, impressing onlookers with his dribbling ability. After the win, Furukawa caused some controversy on his social media account, by stating he was not motivated by the opposition in the easy win.

On 6 September 2024, Furukawa joined Polish top-flight club Górnik Zabrze on a season-long loan, with an option to make the move permanent.

On 19 June 2025, Furukawa joined German second division side Darmstadt 98.

== Style of play ==
An excellent dribbler of the ball, Furukawa found national and international acclaim after scoring a solo goal for Shizuoka Gakuen High School.

== Career statistics ==
As of match played 17 May 2025

Appearances and goals by club, season and competition
Club	Season	League			National cup (Note: Includes Emperor's Cup, Polish Cup)		League cup (Note: Includes J.League Cup)		Other		Total	
Club	Season	Division	Apps	Goals	Apps	Goals	Apps	Goals	Apps	Goals	Apps	Goals
Júbilo Iwata	2022	J1 League	7	1	2	1	5	0	0	0	14	2
Júbilo Iwata	2023	J2 League	28	1	2	1	6	1	0	0	36	3
Júbilo Iwata	2024	J1 League	24	2	1	0	1	0	0	0	26	2
Júbilo Iwata	Total		59	4	5	2	12	1	0	0	76	7
Górnik Zabrze (loan)	2024–25	Ekstraklasa	24	2	1	0	—		—		25	2
Career total			83	6	6	2	12	1	0	0	101	9
