= Makito Ito =

Japanese footballer (born 1992)

Makito Ito 伊藤 槙人
Personal information
- Full name: Makito Ito
- Date of birth: 18 October 1992 (age 34)
- Place of birth: Shizuoka, Japan
- Height: 1.83 m (6 ft 0 in)
- Position: Centre back

Team information
- Current team: Yokohama FC
- Number: 16

Youth career
- 2005–2007: Júbilo Iwata
- 2008–2010: Hamana High School

College career
Years	Team	Apps	(Gls)
2011–2014	Komazawa University		

Senior career*
Years	Team	Apps	(Gls)
2015	JEF United Chiba	1	(0)
2016–2019	Mito Hollyhock	74	(1)
2017	→ Fujieda MYFC (loan)	15	(1)
2019–2021	Yokohama F. Marinos	22	(0)
2021	→ Júbilo Iwata	18	(0)
2022–2024	Júbilo Iwata	71	(2)
2025–	Yokohama FC	46	(4)
- * Club domestic league appearances and goals as of 11:53, 27 May 2026 (UTC)

Makito Ito (伊藤 槙人, Itō Makito; born 18 October 1992) is a Japanese professional footballer who plays as a centre back for J2 League club Yokohama FC.

== Career ==
On 25 December 2024, Ito transferred to newly-promoted J1 League club Yokohama FC ahead of the 2025 season.

== Career statistics ==
=== Club ===
As of the start from 2025 season.

Appearances and goals by club, season and competition
Club	Season	League			National cup		League cup		Continental		Other		Total	
Club	Season	Division	Apps	Goals	Apps	Goals	Apps	Goals	Apps	Goals	Apps	Goals	Apps	Goals
Japan			League		Emperor's Cup		J. League Cup		Asia		Other		Total	
JEF United Chiba	2015	J2 League	1	0	0	0	-		-		-		1	0
Mito HollyHock	2016	J2 League	18	0	2	0	-		-		-		20	0
Mito HollyHock	2017	J2 League	2	0	1	1	-		-		-		3	1
Mito HollyHock	2018	J2 League	35	1	1	0	-		-		-		36	1
Mito HollyHock	2019	J2 League	19	0	0	0	-		-		-		19	0
Mito HollyHock	Total		75	1	4	1	0	0	0	0	0	0	79	2
Fujieda MYFC (loan)	2017	J3 League	15	1	0	0	–						15	1
Fujieda MYFC (loan)	Total		15	1	0	0	–						15	1
Yokohama F. Marinos	2019	J1 League	3	0	2	0	0	0	-		-		5	0
Yokohama F. Marinos	2020	J1 League	19	0	0	0	0	0	3	0	1 (Note: Appearances in Japanese Super Cup)	0	23	0
Yokohama F. Marinos	2021	J1 League	0	0	1	0	6	0	-		-		7	0
Yokohama F. Marinos	Total		22	0	3	0	6	0	3	0	1	0	35	0
Júbilo Iwata (loan)	2021	J2 League	18	0	0	0	–						18	0
Júbilo Iwata	2022	J1 League	33	1	2	0	2	0	–				37	1
Júbilo Iwata	2023	J2 League	22	1	1	0	1	0	–				24	1
Júbilo Iwata	2024	J1 League	16	0	0	0	0	0	–				16	0
Júbilo Iwata	Total		89	2	3	0	3	0	–				95	2
Yokohama FC	2025	J1 League	0	0	0	0	0	0	–				0	0
Yokohama FC	Total		0	0	0	0	0	0	0	0	0	0	0	0
Career total			201	4	10	1	9	0	3	0	1	0	224	5

== Honours ==
=== Club ===
Yokohama F. Marinos

- J1 League
  - Champions: 2019

Júbilo Iwata

- J2 League
  - Champions: 2021
  - Runner-up: 2023
