= Kimiidera Athletic Stadium =

Sports venue in Wakayama, Japan

Coordinates: 34°10′00″N 135°11′27″E

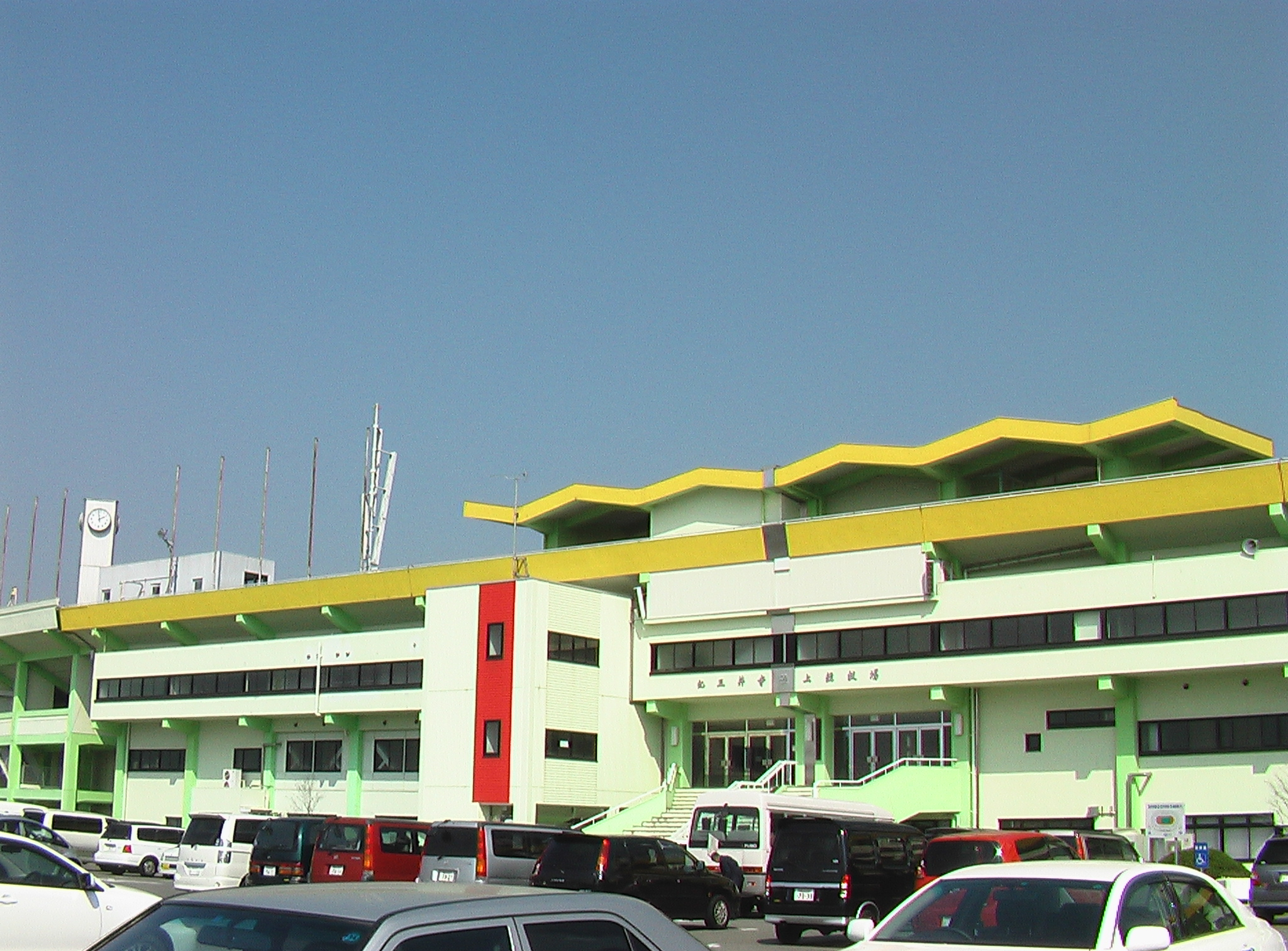
- Interactive map of Kimiidera Athletic Stadium
- Location: Wakayama, Wakayama, Japan
- Owner: Wakayama Prefecture
- Capacity: 19,200

Construction
- Opened: April 1964
- Renovated: March 2013

Kimiidera Athletic Stadium (紀三井寺運動公園陸上競技場, Kimiidera Undōkōen Rikujōkyōgijō) is an athletic stadium in Wakayama, Wakayama, Japan.
