= Naoki Kanuma =

Japanese footballer

Naoki Kanuma 鹿沼 直生
Personal information
- Date of birth: 7 December 1997 (age 28)
- Place of birth: Saitama, Saitama, Japan
- Height: 1.74 m (5 ft 9 in)
- Position: Defensive midfielder

Team information
- Current team: Tokushima Vortis
- Number: 6

Youth career
- –2012: Grande FC
- 2013–2015: Shizuoka Gakuen High School

College career
| Years | Team | Apps | (Gls) |
| 2016–2019 | Senshu University | | |

Senior career*
| Years | Team | Apps | (Gls) |
| 2020 | SC Sagamihara | 34 | (3) |
| 2021–2024 | Júbilo Iwata | 67 | (3) |
| 2024– | Tokushima Vortis | 73 | (9) |
- * Club domestic league appearances and goals as of 16:22, 4 October 2026 (UTC)

Naoki Kanuma (鹿沼 直生, Kanuma Naoki; born 7 December 1997) is a Japanese professional footballer who plays as a defensive midfielder for J2 League club Tokushima Vortis.

== Club statistics ==
As of 4 October 2026.

Appearances and goals by club, season and competition
| Club | Season | League | | | National cup (Note: Includes Emperor's Cup) | | League cup (Note: Includes J.League Cup) | | Other | | Total | |
| Club | Season | Division | Apps | Goals | Apps | Goals | Apps | Goals | Apps | Goals | Apps | Goals |
|---|---|---|---|---|---|---|---|---|---|---|---|---|
| SC Sagamihara | 2020 | J3 League | 34 | 3 | – | | – | | – | | 34 | 3 |
| Júbilo Iwata | 2021 | J2 League | 19 | 1 | 4 | 0 | 0 | 0 | – | | 23 | 1 |
| Júbilo Iwata | 2022 | J1 League | 11 | 2 | 3 | 1 | 5 | 1 | – | | 19 | 4 |
| Júbilo Iwata | 2023 | J2 League | 32 | 0 | 2 | 0 | 6 | 0 | – | | 40 | 0 |
| Júbilo Iwata | 2024 | J1 League | 5 | 0 | 1 | 0 | 1 | 0 | – | | 7 | 0 |
| Júbilo Iwata | Total | | 67 | 3 | 10 | 1 | 12 | 1 | 0 | 0 | 89 | 5 |
| Tokushima Vortis | 2024 | J2 League | 12 | 4 | 0 | 0 | 0 | 0 | 0 | 0 | 12 | 4 |
| Tokushima Vortis | 2025 | J2 League | 34 | 3 | 1 | 0 | 0 | 0 | 2 (Note: Appearance in J1/J2 play-offs) | 0 | 37 | 3 |
| Tokushima Vortis | 2026 | J2/J3 (100) | 18 | 2 | – | | – | | 0 | 0 | 18 | 2 |
| Tokushima Vortis | 2026–27 | J2 League | 9 | 0 | 1 | 0 | 1 | 0 | 0 | 0 | 11 | 0 |
| Tokushima Vortis | Total | | 73 | 9 | 2 | 0 | 1 | 0 | 2 | 0 | 78 | 9 |
| Career total | | | 174 | 15 | 12 | 1 | 13 | 1 | 2 | 0 | 201 | 17 |
