= Atsushi Kurokawa =

Japanese footballer

Atsushi Kurokawa 黒川 淳史
Personal information
- Full name: Atsushi Kurokawa
- Date of birth: 4 February 1998 (age 28)
- Place of birth: Saitama, Japan
- Height: 1.70 m (5 ft 7 in)
- Position: Winger

Team information
- Current team: Ventforet Kofu
- Number: 96

Youth career
- Omiya Ardija

Senior career*
Years	Team	Apps	(Gls)
2016–2021	Omiya Ardija	82	(16)
2018–2019	→ Mito HollyHock (loan)	67	(10)
2022	Júbilo Iwata	8	(0)
2023–2026	Machida Zelvia	4	(1)
2023	→ Omiya Ardija (loan)	12	(0)
2024–2025	→ Mito HollyHock (loan)	15	(2)
2025	→ Spartak Varna (loan)	0	(0)
2025	→ Tukums 2000 (loan)	12	(1)
2026–	Ventforet Kofu	14	(0)

International career^{‡}
2017	Japan U19	1	(0)
- * Club domestic league appearances and goals as of 17 August 2026 ‡ National team caps and goals as of 31 May 2017

Atsushi Kurokawa (黒川 淳史, Kurokawa Atsushi; born 4 February 1998) is a Japanese professional footballer who plays as a winger for J2 League club Ventforet Kofu.

== Club statistics ==
As of match played 29 May 2022

Appearances and goals by club, season and competition
Club	Season	League			National cup		League cup		Total	
Club	Season	Division	Apps	Goals	Apps	Goals	Apps	Goals	Apps	Goals
Japan			League		Emperor's Cup		J. League Cup		Total	
Omiya Ardija	2017	J1 League	3	0	4	1	4	1	11	2
Omiya Ardija	2020	J2 League	37	7	0	0	–		37	7
Omiya Ardija	2021	J2 League	42	9	1	0	–		43	9
Omiya Ardija	Total		82	16	5	1	4	1	91	18
Mito Hollyhock (loan)	2018	J2 League	28	3	0	0	–		28	3
Mito Hollyhock (loan)	2019	J2 League	39	7	1	0	–		40	7
Mito Hollyhock (loan)	Total		67	10	1	0	0	0	68	10
Júbilo Iwata	2022	J1 League	4	0	0	0	6	0	10	0
Total			153	26	6	1	10	1	169	28
