= 2024 J.League Cup =

2024 JリーグYBCルヴァンカップ

Tournament details
- Country: Japan
- Dates: 6 March – 2 November
- Teams: 60

Final positions
- Champions: Nagoya Grampus (2nd title)
- Runners-up: Albirex Niigata

Tournament statistics
- Matches played: 70
- Goals scored: 212 (3.03 per match)
- Attendance: 465,654 (6,652 per match)
- Top goal scorer(s): Motoki Nagakura (6 goals)

The 2024 J.League Cup, known as the 2024 J.League YBC Levain Cup (Japanese: 2024 JリーグYBCルヴァンカップ) for sponsorship reasons, was the 32nd edition of J.League Cup, a Japanese association football cup competition. This season, all 60 J.League clubs participated in an updated tournament format, aimed to grow the J2 and J3 Leagues and improve the J.League as a whole.

The defending champions were Avispa Fukuoka, who were eliminated in the third round.

== Format ==
In a change from previous seasons, all clubs from the season's J1, J2, and J3 Leagues participated, thus including the clubs from all J.League divisions for the first time since 2001. As many as 29 teams participated in the tournament for the first time in their history.

The tournament was divided into three sections each with a different format: the first round, the play-off round and the prime round.

First round

57 clubs took part in the first round, split into 10 groups. The three clubs participating in the 2023–24 AFC Champions League knockout stage (Kawasaki Frontale, Yokohama F. Marinos and Ventforet Kofu) were introduced to the tournament at the prime round. Each group participated in a single-elimination tournament, leaving 10 clubs to advance to the play-off round. The draw for the first round was based on rankings from the 2023 league season. As a general rule, the lower league club played their fixture at home. In the case of clubs being in the same league, the club with the lower ranking from the 2023 season served as the home team. In the case of a draw, games go to extra time and penalties to determine a winner if necessary.

The first round groups are as follows:

Teams participating in the first round of the 2024 J.League Cup
Group	Teams					
1	Vissel Kobe (J1 1st)	Shimizu S-Pulse (J2 4th)	Montedio Yamagata (J2 5th)	Kataller Toyama (J3 3rd)	FC Imabari (J3 4th)	-
2	Sanfrecce Hiroshima (J1 3rd)	Tokyo Verdy (J2 3rd)	JEF United Chiba (J2 6th)	Kagoshima United (J3 2nd)	Nara Club (J3 5th)	-
3	Urawa Reds (J1 4th)	Júbilo Iwata (J2 2nd)	V-Varen Nagasaki (J2 7th)	Ehime FC (J3 1st)	Gainare Tottori (J3 6th)	-
4	Kashima Antlers (J1 5th)	Machida Zelvia (J2 1st)	Oita Trinita (J2 9th)	Zweigen Kanazawa (J2 22nd)	Vanraure Hachinohe (J3 7th)	Giravanz Kitakyushu (J3 20th)
5	Nagoya Grampus (J1 6th)	Yokohama FC (J1 18th)	Fagiano Okayama (J2 10th)	Omiya Ardija (J2 21st)	FC Gifu (J3 8th)	Tegevajaro Miyazaki (J3 19th)
6	Avispa Fukuoka (J1 7th)	Kashiwa Reysol (J1 17th)	Thespa Gunma (J2 11th)	Renofa Yamaguchi (J2 20th)	Matsumoto Yamaga (J3 9th)	SC Sagamihara (J3 18th)
7	Cerezo Osaka (J1 9th)	Gamba Osaka (J1 16th)	Fujieda MYFC (J2 12th)	Tochigi SC (J2 19th)	Iwate Grulla Morioka (J3 10th)	FC Ryukyu (J3 17th)
8	Albirex Niigata (J1 10th)	Shonan Bellmare (J1 15th)	Blaublitz Akita (J2 13th)	Iwaki FC (J2 18th)	FC Osaka (J3 11th)	Kamatamare Sanuki (J3 16th)
9	FC Tokyo (J1 11th)	Sagan Tosu (J1 14th)	Roasso Kumamoto (J2 14th)	Mito HollyHock (J2 17th)	YSCC Yokohama (J3 12th)	Fukushima United FC (J3 15th)
10	Hokkaido Consadole Sapporo (J1 12th)	Kyoto Sanga (J1 13th)	Tokushima Vortis (J2 15th)	Vegalta Sendai (J2 16th)	Azul Claro Numazu (J3 13th)	AC Nagano Parceiro (J3 14th)

Notes

Teams in italic participated in their first J.League Cup tournament.

Playoff round

The 10 clubs that qualified from the first round would be drawn into five, two-legged fixtures and would play each other home and away. The remaining five clubs would advance to the prime round.

Prime round

A single-elimination tournament would be held between eight clubs: the five clubs that qualified from the playoff round plus the AFC Champions League clubs — Kawasaki Frontale, Yokohama F. Marinos, and Ventforet Kofu. Each round would be a two-legged home and away fixture, except the final which would be a one-game tie played at a neutral venue. The draw for the brackets would be held on July 2.

== Schedule ==
The schedule was announced on 19 December 2023. All the matches took place in 2024.

Stage	Round	Date
First round	Round 1	6–13 March
First round	Round 2	17–24 March
First round	Round 3	22 May
Playoff round		5 June (First leg); 9 June (Second leg)
Prime round	Quarter-finals	4 September (First leg); 8 September (Second leg)
Prime round	Semi-finals	9 October (First leg); 13 October (Second leg)
Prime round	Final	2 November

== First round ==
=== Group 1 ===
Round 1
13 March – Toyama
Kataller Toyama	2
Montedio Yamagata	1

Round 2
17 April – Imabari
FC Imabari	1
Vissel Kobe	2
24 April – Toyama
Kataller Toyama	0
Shimizu S-Pulse	0

Round 3
22 May – Toyama
Kataller Toyama	1 (5)
Vissel Kobe	1 (4)

13 March 2024 Round 1	Kataller Toyama (3)	2–1 (a.e.t.)	(2) Montedio Yamagata	Toyama
19:03	Usui 111'; Ito 114'	Report	Kato 92'	Stadium: Toyama Stadium; Attendance: 1,827; Referee: Yusuke Araki

17 April 2024 Round 2	FC Imabari (3)	1–2 (a.e.t.)	(1) Vissel Kobe	Imabari
19:03	Ichihara 5'	Report	Patric 40'; Sasaki 95' (pen.)	Stadium: Imabari Satoyama Stadium; Attendance: 5,097; Referee: Yusuke Araki

23 April 2024 Round 2	Kataller Toyama (3)	0–0 (a.e.t.) (6–5 p)	(2) Shimizu S-Pulse	Toyama
07:03		Report		Stadium: Toyama Stadium; Attendance: 3,257; Referee: Futoshi Nakamura
	Penalties
	Matsumoto (penalty scored); Shiina (penalty missed); Takahashi (penalty scored); Kawakami (penalty scored); Imase (penalty scored); Usui (penalty missed); Kamiyama (penalty scored); Tagawa (penalty scored)		(penalty scored) Chiba; (penalty scored) Kawamoto; (penalty scored) Nishizawa; (penalty missed) Hara; (penalty scored) Naruoka; (penalty missed) Shirasaki; (penalty scored) Kitazume; (penalty missed) Oki

22 May 2024 Round 3	Kataller Toyama (3)	1–1 (5–4 p)	(1) Vissel Kobe	Toyama
19:03	Hirose 70' (o.g.)	Report	Ide 19'	Stadium: Toyama Stadium; Attendance: 8,223; Referee: Koichiro Fukushima
	Penalties
	Matsumoto (penalty scored); Imase (penalty scored); Leiria (penalty scored); Takahashi (penalty scored); Kawakami (penalty scored)		(penalty missed) Miyashiro; (penalty scored) Iwanami; (penalty scored) Ideguchi; (penalty scored) Hatsuse; (penalty scored) Hirose

=== Group 2 ===
Round 1
6 March – Kagoshima
Kagoshima United	1
JEF United Chiba	0

Round 2
24 April – Nara
Nara Club	0
Sanfrecce Hiroshima	6
17 April – Kagoshima
Kagoshima United	0
Tokyo Verdy	1

Round 3
22 May – Chofu
Tokyo Verdy	2
Sanfrecce Hiroshima	3

6 March 2024 Round 1	Kagoshima United (2)	1–0	(2) JEF United Chiba	Kagoshima
19:00	Suzuki 72' (pen.)	Report		Stadium: Shiranami Stadium; Attendance: 3,570; Referee: Tetsuro Yoshida

24 April 2024 Round 2	Nara Club (3)	0–6	(1) Sanfrecce Hiroshima	Nara
19:00		Report	Kashiwa 43'; Ohashi 48'; Mitsuta 52' (pen.); Higashi 89'; Sotiriou 90+1'; Marcos Júnior 90+3' (pen.)	Stadium: Rohto Field Nara; Attendance: 2,818; Referee: Yoshiro Imamura

17 April 2024 Round 2	Kagoshima United (2)	0–1	(1) Tokyo Verdy	Kagoshima
19:03		Report	Yamamoto 45+1'	Stadium: Shiranami Stadium; Attendance: 4,347; Referee: Masuya Ueda

22 May 2024 Round 3	Tokyo Verdy (1)	2–3	(1) Sanfrecce Hiroshima	Chofu
19:03	Miki 74', 83'	Report	Ohashi 5', 14'; Kawamura 78'	Stadium: Ajinomoto Stadium; Attendance: 6,150; Referee: Yoshiro Imamura

=== Group 3 ===
Round 1
6 March – Matsuyama
Ehime FC	3
V-Varen Nagasaki	4

Round 2
24 April – Tottori
Gainare Tottori	2
Urawa Red Diamonds	5
17 April – Isahaya
V-Varen Nagasaki	1
Júbilo Iwata	0

Round 3
22 May – Isahaya
V-Varen Nagasaki	1
Urawa Red Diamonds	0

6 March 2024 Round 1	Ehime FC (2)	3–4 (a.e.t.)	(2) V-Varen Nagasaki	Matsuyama
19:03	Duncan 23' (pen.); Funahashi 77'; Sato 82'	Report	Junio 2'; Jesus 32', 118'; Juanma 90+1' (pen.)	Stadium: Ningineer Stadium; Attendance: 1,411; Referee: Reo Tanaka

24 April 2024 Round 2	Gainare Tottori (3)	2–5	(1) Urawa Red Diamonds	Tottori
19:33	Tanaka 36'; Matsuki 64'	Report	Takeda 13'; Thiago Santana 17' (pen.); Ito 52'; Nakajima 55', 90+3'	Stadium: Axis Bird Stadium; Attendance: 7,677; Referee: Koji Takasaki

17 April 2024 Round 2	V-Varen Nagasaki (2)	1–0	(1) Júbilo Iwata	Isahaya
19:03	Kushibiki 53'	Report		Stadium: Transcosmos Stadium Nagasaki; Attendance: 2,560; Referee: Tetsuro Yoshida

22 May 2024 Round 3	V-Varen Nagasaki (2)	1–0	(1) Urawa Red Diamonds	Isahaya
19:03	Juanma 78'	Report		Stadium: Transcosmos Stadium Nagasaki; Attendance: 7,872; Referee: Yoshimi Yamashita

=== Group 4 ===
Round 1
6 March – Kitakyushu
Giravanz Kitakyushu	1
Oita Trinita	0
13 March – Hachinohe
Vanraure Hachinohe	0
Zweigen Kanazawa	0

Round 2
17 April – Kitakyushu
Giravanz Kitakyushu	1
FC Machida Zelvia	2
17 April – Hachinohe
Vanraure Hachinohe	1
Kashima Antlers	2

Round 3
22 May – Machida
FC Machida Zelvia	2
Kashima Antlers	0

6 March 2024 Round 1	Giravanz Kitakyushu (3)	1–0 (a.e.t.)	(2) Oita Trinita	Kitakyushu
19:03	Watanabe 113'	Report		Stadium: Mikuni World Stadium Kitakyushu; Attendance: 4,412; Referee: Ismail Elfath (USA)

13 March 2024 Round 1	Vanraure Hachinohe (3)	0–0 (a.e.t.) (5–3 p)	(3) Zweigen Kanazawa	Hachinohe
18:33		Report		Stadium: Prifoods Stadium; Attendance: 719; Referee: Hiroyuki Kimura
	Penalties
	Maezawa (penalty scored); Sunday (penalty scored); Sato (penalty scored); Yamauchi (penalty scored); Yagishita (penalty scored)		(penalty scored) Marlyson; (penalty scored) Sugiura; (penalty missed) Nagamine; (penalty scored) Kojima

17 April 2024 Round 2	Giravanz Kitakyushu (3)	1–2	(1) FC Machida Zelvia	Kitakyushu
19:03	Wakaya 54'	Report	Vásquez 49'; Yasui 79'	Stadium: Mikuni World Stadium Kitakyushu; Attendance: 4,221; Referee: Takuto Okabe

17 April 2024 Round 2	Vanraure Hachinohe (3)	1–2 (a.e.t.)	(1) Kashima Antlers	Hachinohe
19:03	Shibata 25'	Report	Anzai 82'; Chinen 108'	Stadium: Prifoods Stadium; Attendance: 4,844; Referee: Keigo Sendachi

22 May 2024 Round 3	FC Machida Zelvia (1)	2–0	(1) Kashima Antlers	Machida
19:00	Duke 20', 36'	Report		Stadium: Machida GION Stadium; Attendance: 4,537; Referee: Takuto Okabe

=== Group 5 ===
Round 1
13 March – Gifu
FC Gifu	1
Omiya Ardija	2
6 March – Shintomi
Tegevajaro Miyazaki	1
Fagiano Okayama	4

Round 2
17 April – Saitama
Omiya Ardija	0
Nagoya Grampus	2
24 April – Okayama
Fagiano Okayama	3
Yokohama FC	3

Round 3
22 May – Yokohama
Yokohama FC	1
Nagoya Grampus	3

13 March 2024 Round 1	FC Gifu (3)	1–2	(3) Omiya Ardija	Gifu
19:03	Aihara 66'	Report	Urakami 51'; Taneda 84'	Stadium: Gifu Nagaragawa Stadium; Attendance: 2,006; Referee: Shuhei Ishimaru

6 March 2024 Round 1	Tegevajaro Miyazaki (3)	1–4	(2) Fagiano Okayama	Shintomi
19:03	Ueno 50'	Report	Lucão 4'; Semba 66'; Yoshio 70'; Kawano 90'	Stadium: Unilever Stadium Shintomi; Attendance: 708; Referee: Naoto Uehara

17 April 2024 Round 2	Omiya Ardija (3)	0–2	(1) Nagoya Grampus	Saitama
19:03		Report	Patric 45+1', 54' (pen.)	Stadium: NACK5 Stadium Omiya; Attendance: 5,467; Referee: Naoto Uehara

24 April 2024 Round 2	Fagiano Okayama (2)	3–3 (a.e.t.) (3–5 p)	(2) Yokohama FC	Okayama
17:03	Tanaka 15', 93'; Kimura 60'	Report	Ogura 42'; Sakuragawa 55'; Caprini 107'	Stadium: City Light Stadium; Attendance: 2,827; Referee: Hayato Shimizu
	Penalties
	Iwabuchi (penalty scored); Kimura (penalty scored); Wasaka (penalty missed); Motoyama (penalty scored)		(penalty scored) Caprini; (penalty scored) Mita; (penalty scored) Iwatake; (penalty scored) Nduka; (penalty scored) Nakano

22 May 2024 Round 3	Yokohama FC (2)	1–3	(1) Nagoya Grampus	Yokohama
19:03	Ogura 44'	Report	Nagai 5'; Nogami 7'; Yoshida 63'	Stadium: NHK Spring Mitsuzawa Football Stadium; Attendance: 3,423; Referee: Hayato Shimizu

=== Group 6 ===
Round 1
13 March – Matsumoto
Matsumoto Yamaga	3
Renofa Yamaguchi	3
6 March – Maebashi (Note: Since Sagamihara's home stadium, Sagamihara Gion Stadium was unusable due to renovation work, the game was held as a home game for Gunma.)
Thespa Gunma	4
SC Sagamihara	1

Round 2
17 April – Matsumoto
Matsumoto Yamaga	1 (2)
Avispa Fukuoka	1 (4)
24 April – Maebashi
Thespa Gunma	1
Kashiwa Reysol	3

Round 3
22 May – Kashiwa
Kashiwa Reysol	2
Avispa Fukuoka	1

13 March 2024 Round 1	Matsumoto Yamaga (3)	3–3 (a.e.t.) (4–3 p)	(2) Renofa Yamaguchi	Matsumoto
19:00	Sumida 23'; Nonomura 94', 102'	Report	Yamamoto 69'; Suenaga 104'; Sílvio 120'	Stadium: Sunpro Alwin; Attendance: 2,919; Referee: Koki Nagamine

6 March 2024 Round 1	Thespa Gunma (2)	4–1 (a.e.t.)	(3) SC Sagamihara	Maebashi
19:00	Kitagawa 13'; Wada 96', 111'; Sagawa 120+4'	Report	Bruno Santos 32' (pen.)	Stadium: Shoda Shoyu Stadium Gunma; Attendance: 1,710; Referee: Genki Tawara

17 April 2024 Round 2	Matsumoto Yamaga (3)	1–1 (a.e.t.) (2–4 p)	(1) Avispa Fukuoka	Matsumoto
19:00	Inoue 42' (o.g.)	Report	Inoue 73'	Stadium: Sunpro Alwin; Attendance: 3,281; Referee: Yoshimi Yamashita
	Penalties
	Murakoshi (penalty scored); Ando (penalty missed); Yasunaga (penalty scored); Yamamoto (penalty missed)		(penalty scored) Shigemi; (penalty scored) Matsuoka; (penalty scored) Konno; (penalty scored) Wellington

24 April 2024 Round 2	Thespa Gunma (2)	1–3	(1) Kashiwa Reysol	Maebashi
19:03	Sato 90+2'	Report	Muto 33'; Tatsuta 40'; Toshima 45+2'	Stadium: Shoda Shoyu Stadium Gunma; Attendance: 1,950; Referee: Akihiko Ikeuchi

22 May 2024 Round 3	Kashiwa Reysol (1)	2–1	(1) Avispa Fukuoka	Kashiwa
19:03	Unoki 11'; Noda 90+2'	Report	Inoue 47'	Stadium: Sankyo Frontier Kashiwa Stadium; Attendance: 3,848; Referee: Sascha Stegemann (Germany)

=== Group 7 ===
Round 1
13 March – Morioka
Iwate Grulla Morioka	1
Tochigi SC	0
6 March – Okinawa
FC Ryukyu	2
Fujieda MYFC	1

Round 2
17 April – Morioka
Iwate Grulla Morioka	0
Cerezo Osaka	1
24 April – Okinawa
FC Ryukyu	2
Gamba Osaka	1

Round 3
22 May – Okinawa
FC Ryukyu	0
Cerezo Osaka	1

13 March 2024 Round 1	Iwate Grulla Morioka (3)	1–0	(2) Tochigi SC	Morioka
19:00	Otabor 70'	Report		Stadium: Iwagin Stadium; Attendance: 757; Referee: Takuto Okabe

6 March 2024 Round 1	FC Ryukyu (3)	2–1	(2) Fujieda MYFC	Okinawa
19:03	Sato 52', 80'	Report	Nakashima 49'	Stadium: Tapic Kenso Hiyagon Stadium; Attendance: 881; Referee: Koei Koya

17 April 2024 Round 2	Iwate Grulla Morioka (3)	0–1	(1) Cerezo Osaka	Morioka
19:03		Report	Vitor Bueno 67'	Stadium: Iwagin Stadium; Attendance: 2,362; Referee: Yudai Yamamoto

24 April 2024 Round 2	FC Ryukyu (3)	2–1	(1) Gamba Osaka	Okinawa
19:30	Tomidokoro 43'; Shirai 76'	Report	Suzuki 49'	Stadium: Tapic Kenso Hiyagon Stadium; Attendance: 5,406; Referee: Koichiro Fukushima

22 May 2024 Round 3	FC Ryukyu (3)	0–1	(1) Cerezo Osaka	Okinawa
19:03		Report	Hirano 6'	Stadium: Tapic Kenso Hiyagon Stadium; Attendance: 7,034; Referee: Akihiko Ikeuchi

=== Group 8 ===
Round 1
13 March – Higashiōsaka
FC Osaka	0
Iwaki FC	2
6 March – Marugame
Kamatamare Sanuki	0
Blaublitz Akita	2

Round 2
17 April – Iwaki
Iwaki FC	0
Albirex Niigata	2
24 April – Akita
Blaublitz Akita	2
Shonan Bellmare	1

Round 3
22 May – Akita
Blaublitz Akita	0
Albirex Niigata	2

13 March 2024 Round 1	FC Osaka (3)	0–2	(2) Iwaki FC	Higashiōsaka
19:00		Report	Yamaguchi 71'; Kondo 87'	Stadium: Hanazono Rugby Stadium; Attendance: 1,980; Referee: Masuya Ueda

6 March 2024 Round 1	Kamatamare Sanuki (3)	0–2	(2) Blaublitz Akita	Marugame
19:03		Report	Sato 35'; Niwa 90+2'	Stadium: Pikara Stadium; Attendance: 689; Referee: Yuzo Sutani

17 April 2024 Round 2	Iwaki FC (2)	0–2	(1) Albirex Niigata	Iwaki
19:03		Report	Hasegawa 6'; Taniguchi 90+1'	Stadium: Hawaiians Stadium Iwaki; Attendance: 3,618; Referee: Hiroki Kasahara

24 April 2024 Round 2	Blaublitz Akita (2)	2–1 (a.e.t.)	(1) Shonan Bellmare	Akita
19:03	Aoki 74'; Komatsu 97'	Report	Fukuda 54'	Stadium: Soyu Stadium; Attendance: 1,335; Referee: Yoshimi Yamashita

22 May 2024 Round 3	Blaublitz Akita (2)	0–2 (a.e.t.)	(1) Albirex Niigata	Akita
19:03		Report	Ishiyama 99'; Okumura 111'	Stadium: Soyu Stadium; Attendance: 2,810; Referee: Jumpei Iida

=== Group 9 ===
Round 1
6 March – Yokohama
YSCC Yokohama	1
Mito HollyHock	0
13 March – Fukushima
Fukushima United FC	1
Roasso Kumamoto	2

Round 2
17 April – Yokohama
YSCC Yokohama	0
FC Tokyo	4
24 April – Kumamoto
Roasso Kumamoto	0
Sagan Tosu	1

Round 3
22 May – Tosu
Sagan Tosu	1 (4)
FC Tokyo	1 (5)

6 March 2024 Round 1	YSCC Yokohama (3)	1–0	(2) Mito HollyHock	Yokohama
19:03	Matsumura 67'	Report		Stadium: NHK Spring Mitsuzawa Football Stadium; Attendance: 1,192; Referee: Yoshikazu Matsuzawa

13 March 2024 Round 1	Fukushima United FC (3)	1–2	(2) Roasso Kumamoto	Fukushima
19:00	Yajima 90+3'	Report	Fujita 4'; Osaki 35'	Stadium: Toho Stadium; Attendance: 690; Referee: Keisuke Nobori

17 April 2024 Round 2	YSCC Yokohama (3)	0–4	(1) FC Tokyo	Yokohama
19:03		Report	Ogashiwa 13'; Harakawa 39'; Endo 61'; Jajá 90+3'	Stadium: NHK Spring Mitsuzawa Football Stadium; Attendance: 4,083; Referee: Takafumi Mikuriya

24 April 2024 Round 2	Roasso Kumamoto (2)	0–1	(1) Sagan Tosu	Kumamoto
19:03		Report	Yokoyama 26'	Stadium: Egao Kenko Stadium; Attendance: 4,120; Referee: Yuichi Nishimura

22 May 2024 Round 3	Sagan Tosu (1)	1–1 (4–5 p)	(1) FC Tokyo	Tosu
19:03	Marcelo Ryan 90+1'	Report	Morishige 56'	Stadium: Ekimae Real Estate Stadium; Attendance: 2,862; Referee: Keigo Sendachi
	Penalties
	Marcelo Ryan (penalty scored); Tezuka (penalty scored); Yamazaki (penalty scored); Yokoyama (penalty scored); Naganuma (penalty missed)		(penalty scored) Morishige; (penalty scored) Araki; (penalty scored) Endo; (penalty scored) Tokumoto; (penalty scored) Koizumi

=== Group 10 ===
Round 1
6 March – Numazu
Azul Claro Numazu	3
Vegalta Sendai	2
13 March – Nagano
AC Nagano Parceiro	5
Tokushima Vortis	1

Round 2
17 April – Numazu
Azul Claro Numazu	1
Consadole Sapporo	3
24 April – Nagano
AC Nagano Parceiro	3
Kyoto Sanga	2

Round 3
22 May – Nagano
AC Nagano Parceiro	1 (3)
Consadole Sapporo	1 (5)

6 March 2024 Round 1	Azul Claro Numazu (3)	3–2	(2) Vegalta Sendai	Numazu
19:03	Tokunaga 79'; Numata 87'; Hama 90+4'	Report	Sugawara 54'; Goke 83'	Stadium: Ashitaka Park Stadium; Attendance: 1,600; Referee: Yusuke Ohashi

13 March 2024 Round 1	AC Nagano Parceiro (3)	5–1	(2) Tokushima Vortis	Nagano
19:00	Lee Seung-won 18'; Kondo 31', 40'; Kato 66'; Kihara 88'	Report	Kaique 55'	Stadium: Minami Nagano Sports Park Stadium; Attendance: 2,248; Referee: Hiroki Kasahara

17 April 2024 Round 2	Azul Claro Numazu (3)	1–3	(1) Hokkaido Consadole Sapporo	Numazu
19:03	Akatsuka 53'	Report	Tanaka 10'; Kobayashi 55', 60'	Stadium: Ashitaka Park Stadium; Attendance: 3,455; Referee: Yoshiro Imamura

24 April 2024 Round 2	AC Nagano Parceiro (3)	3–2 (a.e.t.)	(1) Kyoto Sanga	Nagano
19:03	Sanda 39'; Kuroishi 84'; Sugii 109'	Report	Iida 14'; Hiraga 28'	Stadium: Minami Nagano Sports Park Stadium; Attendance: 3,700; Referee: Koei Koya

22 May 2024 Round 3	AC Nagano Parceiro (3)	1–1 (3–5 p)	(1) Hokkaido Consadole Sapporo	Nagano
19:03	Konishi 18'	Report	Ieizumi 90+7'	Stadium: Minami Nagano Sports Park Stadium; Attendance: 4,800; Referee: Masuya Ueda
	Penalties
	Kato (penalty scored); Shin (penalty scored); Yamanaka (penalty scored); Sunamori (penalty missed)		(penalty scored) Omori; (penalty scored) K. Tanaka; (penalty scored) H. Tanaka; (penalty scored) Hasegawa; (penalty scored) Nakamura

== Playoff round ==
Kataller Toyama from J3 League were the lowest-ranked team remaining in the competition.

=== Summary ===
Team 1	Agg.	Team 2	1st leg	2nd leg
Kataller Toyama (3)	2–3	(1) Hokkaido Consadole Sapporo	1–1	1–2
Sanfrecce Hiroshima (1)	5–2	(1) FC Tokyo	2–1	3–1
V-Varen Nagasaki (2)	2–3	(1) Albirex Niigata	1–2	1–1
Machida Zelvia (1)	5–3	(1) Cerezo Osaka	3–1	2–2
Nagoya Grampus (1)	2–1	(1) Kashiwa Reysol	1–1	1–0

=== Matches ===
5 June 2024	Hokkaido Consadole Sapporo	1–1	Kataller Toyama	Sapporo
19:33	Hasegawa 81'	JLeague.co (EN) (JA)	Usui 8'	Stadium: Sapporo Dome; Attendance: 4,922; Referee: Yuichi Nishimura

9 June 2024	Kataller Toyama	1–2 (2–3 agg.)	Hokkaido Consadole Sapporo	Toyama
14:03	Usui 90'	JLeague.co (EN) (JA)	Suzuki 40'; Nakamura 51'	Stadium: Toyama Stadium; Attendance: 7,701; Referee: Hayato Shimizu

5 June 2024	FC Tokyo	1–2	Sanfrecce Hiroshima	Chofu
19:03	Diego Oliveira 25' (pen.)	JLeague.co (EN) (JA)	Kato 10'; Matsumoto 11'	Stadium: Ajinomoto Stadium; Attendance: 7,265; Referee: Hiroki Kasahara

9 June 2024	Sanfrecce Hiroshima	3–1 (5–2 agg.)	FC Tokyo	Hiroshima
18:03	Kato 53', 68'; Ohashi 55'	JLeague.co (EN) (JA)	Otani 77'	Stadium: Edion Peace Wing Hiroshima; Attendance: 17,924; Referee: Jumpei Iida

5 June 2024	Albirex Niigata	2–1	V-Varen Nagasaki	Niigata
19:03	Komi 69'; Nagakura 82'	JLeague.co (EN) (JA)	Yamada 18'	Stadium: Denka Big Swan Stadium; Attendance: 7,325; Referee: Yoshiro Imamura

9 June 2024	V-Varen Nagasaki	1–1 (2–3 agg.)	Albirex Niigata	Isahaya
18:03	Junio 71'	JLeague.co (EN) (JA)	Nagakura 80'	Stadium: Transcosmos Stadium Nagasaki; Attendance: 6,534; Referee: Takafumi Mikuriya

5 June 2024	Cerezo Osaka	1–3	Machida Zelvia	Osaka
19:03	Croux 6'	JLeague.co (EN) (JA)	Shimoda 61'; Na Sang-ho 62'; Erik 87'	Stadium: Yodoko Sakura Stadium; Attendance: 7,372; Referee: Yoshimi Yamashita

9 June 2024	Machida Zelvia	2–2 (5–3 agg.)	Cerezo Osaka	Machida
14:03	Na Sang-ho 5'; Shoji 21'	JLeague.co (EN) (JA)	Shoji 26' (o.g.); Uejo 36'	Stadium: Machida GION Stadium; Attendance: 5,243; Referee: Atsushi Kamimura

5 June 2024	Kashiwa Reysol	1–1	Nagoya Grampus	Kashiwa
19:03	Takamine 72'	JLeague.co (EN) (JA)	Yamagishi 15'	Stadium: Sankyo Frontier Kashiwa Stadium; Attendance: 4,372; Referee: Koichiro Fukushima

9 June 2024	Nagoya Grampus	1–0 (2–1 agg.)	Kashiwa Reysol	Toyota
16:03	Nakayama 33'	JLeague.co (EN) (JA)		Stadium: Toyota Stadium; Attendance: 11,093; Referee: Futoshi Nakamura

== Prime round ==
The pairings and match-ups for the prime round were announced on 2 July 2024.

=== Quarter-finals ===
==== Summary ====
Team 1	Agg.	Team 2	1st leg	2nd leg
Sanfrecce Hiroshima (1)	2–2 (3–1 p)	(1) Nagoya Grampus	1–0	1–2 (a.e.t.)
Hokkaido Consadole Sapporo (1)	4–7	(1) Yokohama F. Marinos	1–6	3–1
Ventforet Kofu (2)	1–2	(1) Kawasaki Frontale	0–1	1–1
Machida Zelvia (1)	2–5	(1) Albirex Niigata	0–5	2–0

==== Matches ====
4 September 2024	Nagoya Grampus	0–1	Sanfrecce Hiroshima	Toyota
19:03		Report	Arslan 58'	Stadium: Toyota Stadium; Attendance: 11,918; Referee: Hiroki Kasahara

8 September 2024	Sanfrecce Hiroshima	1–2 (a.e.t.) (1–3 p)	Nagoya Grampus	Hiroshima
18:33	Higashi 102'	Report	Patric 9'; Koshimichi 112' (o.g.)	Stadium: Edion Peace Wing Hiroshima; Attendance: 20,993; Referee: Yuichi Nishimura
	Penalties
	Paciência (penalty missed); Mitsuta (penalty missed); Nakajima (penalty scored); Matsumoto (penalty missed)		(penalty scored) Inagaki; (penalty scored) Langerak; (penalty scored) Morishima

4 September 2024	Yokohama F. Marinos	6–1	Hokkaido Consadole Sapporo	Yokohama
19:03	Uenaka 30', 36'; Park Min-kyu 59' (o.g.); Amano 63', 74'; Mizunuma 86'	Report	Shirai 77'	Stadium: NHK Spring Mitsuzawa Football Stadium; Attendance: 7,996; Referee: Takafumi Mikuriya

8 September 2024	Hokkaido Consadole Sapporo	3–1 (4–7 agg.)	Yokohama F. Marinos	Sapporo
14:03	Suga 48', 77'; Sánchez 90+3'	Report	Yan 14'	Stadium: Daiwa House Premist Dome; Attendance: 10,930; Referee: Futoshi Nakamura

4 September 2024	Kawasaki Frontale	1–0	Ventforet Kofu	Kawasaki
19:03	Tono 27'	Report		Stadium: Uvance Todoroki Stadium by Fujitsu; Attendance: 14,847; Referee: Yudai Yamamoto

8 September 2024	Ventforet Kofu	1–1 (1–2 agg.)	Kawasaki Frontale	Kofu
18:03	Son 31'	Report	Tono 90+3'	Stadium: JIT Recycle Ink Stadium; Attendance: 10,273; Referee: Akihiko Ikeuchi

4 September 2024	Albirex Niigata	5–0	Machida Zelvia	Niigata
19:03	Nagakura 16', 49', 87', 90+5'; Ono 42'	Report		Stadium: Denka Big Swan Stadium; Attendance: 9,130; Referee: Akihiko Ikeuchi

8 September 2024	Machida Zelvia	2–0 (2–5 agg.)	Albirex Niigata	Machida
18:03	Nakashima 41'; Shimoda 45'	Report		Stadium: Machida GION Stadium; Attendance: 6,726; Referee: Koichiro Fukushima

=== Summary ===
Team 1	Agg.	Team 2	1st leg	2nd leg
Nagoya Grampus (1)	4–3	Yokohama F. Marinos (1)	1–3	1–2
Kawasaki Frontale (1)	1–6	Albirex Niigata (1)	4–1	0–2

==== Matches ====
9 October 2024	Yokohama F. Marinos	1–3	Nagoya Grampus	Yokohama
19:03	Anderson Lopes 31'	Report	Shiihashi 3'; Mikuni 15'; Yamagishi 76'	Stadium: Nissan Stadium; Attendance: 10,529; Referee: Futoshi Nakamura

13 October 2024	Nagoya Grampus	1–2 (4–3 agg.)	Yokohama F. Marinos	Toyota
15:00	Yamagishi 47'	Report	Nishimura 33'; Uenaka 82'	Stadium: Toyota Stadium; Attendance: 29,081; Referee: Yuichi Nishimura

9 October 2024	Albirex Niigata	4–1	Kawasaki Frontale	Niigata
19:03	Taniguchi 25'; Ota 45'; Hasegawa 50'; Hoshi 53'	Report	Segawa 71'	Stadium: Denka Big Swan Stadium; Attendance: 12,501; Referee: Yudai Yamamoto

13 October 2024	Kawasaki Frontale	0–2 (1–6 agg.)	Albirex Niigata	Kawasaki
15:00		Report	Komi 31'; Ota 89'	Stadium: Uvance Todoroki Stadium by Fujitsu; Attendance: 21,159; Referee: Akihiko Ikeuchi

=== Final ===
2 November 2024
13:05 JST

Nagoya Grampus	3–3 (a.e.t.)	Albirex Niigata
Nagai 31', 42'; Nakayama 93'	Report	Taniguchi 71'; Komi 90+11' (pen.), 111'
Penalties
Inagaki (penalty scored); Langerak (penalty scored); Yamanaka (penalty scored); Junker (penalty scored); Yamagishi (penalty scored)	5–4	(penalty scored) Akiyama; (penalty missed) Nagakura; (penalty scored) Deng; (penalty scored) Hoshi; (penalty scored) Komi

Japan National Stadium, Shinjuku, Tokyo
Attendance: 62,517
Referee: Koichiro Fukushima

== Top scorers ==
Rank	Player	Club	Goals
1	(Japan) Motoki Nagakura	Albirex Niigata	6
2	(Japan) Yota Komi	Albirex Niigata	4
2	(Japan) Yuki Ohashi	Sanfrecce Hiroshima	4
4	(Japan) Mutsuki Kato	Sanfrecce Hiroshima	3
4	(Japan) Kensuke Nagai	Nagoya Grampus	3
4	(Brazil) Patric	Nagoya Grampus	3
4	(Japan) Kaito Taniguchi	Albirex Niigata	3
4	(Japan) Shosei Usui	Kataller Toyama	3
9	(Japan) Jun Amano	Yokohama F. Marinos	2
9	(Australia) Mitchell Duke	Machida Zelvia	2
9	(Japan) Seiya Inoue	Avispa Fukuoka	2
9	(Brazil) Matheus Jesus	V-Varen Nagasaki	2
9	(Spain) Juanma	V-Varen Nagasaki	2
9	(Brazil) Edigar Junio	V-Varen Nagasaki	2
9	(Japan) Yuki Kobayashi	Hokkaido Consadole Sapporo	2
9	(Japan) Takashi Kondo	Nagano Parceiro	2
9	(Japan) Tomoya Miki	Tokyo Verdy	2
9	(South Korea) Na Sang-ho	Machida Zelvia	2
9	(Japan) Shoya Nakajima	Urawa Red Diamonds	2
9	(Japan) Katsuhiro Nakayama	Nagoya Grampus	2
9	(Japan) Takato Nonomura	Matsumoto Yamaga	2
9	(Japan) Hinata Ogura	Yokohama FC	2
9	(Japan) Yuta Sato	FC Ryukyu	2
9	(Japan) Haruto Shirai	Hokkaido Consadole Sapporo	2
9	(Japan) Daiki Suga	Hokkaido Consadole Sapporo	2
9	(Japan) Yudai Tanaka	Fagiano Okayama	2
9	(Japan) Asahi Uenaka	Yokohama F. Marinos	2
9	(Japan) Masashi Wada	Thespa Gunma	2
9	(Japan) Hokuto Shimoda	Machida Zelvia	2
9	(Japan) Daiya Tono	Kawasaki Frontale	2
9	(Japan) Shunki Higashi	Sanfrecce Hiroshima	2
9	(Japan) Yuya Yamagishi	Nagoya Grampus	2
