= 2023 Fagiano Okayama season =

Fagiano Okayama
2023 season
- Chairman: Shinya Kitagawa
- Manager: Takashi Kiyama
- Stadium: City Light Stadium
- J2 League: 10th
- Emperor's Cup: Second round
- All statistics correct as of May 2023.

The 2023 season was Fagiano Okayama's 19th season in existence and the club's 15th consecutive season in the second division of Japanese football. In addition to the domestic league, Fagiano Okayama participated in this season's edition of the Emperor's Cup.

== Players ==
=== First-team squad ===
As of 28 April 2023.

Note: Flags indicate national team as defined under FIFA eligibility rules; some limited exceptions apply. Players may hold more than one non-FIFA nationality.

No.	Pos.	Nation	Player
1	GK	JPN	Daiki Hotta
2	DF	JPN	Yuya Takagi
4	DF	JPN	Mizuki Hamada
5	DF	JPN	Yasutaka Yanagi
6	MF	JPN	Yuji Wakasa
7	FW	BRA	Tiago Alves
8	MF	AUS	Stefan Mauk
9	FW	KOR	Han Eui-kwon
13	GK	JPN	Junki Kanayama
14	MF	JPN	Yudai Tanaka
15	DF	JPN	Haruka Motoyama
16	DF	JPN	Ryosuke Kawano
18	FW	JPN	Solomon Sakuragawa (on loan from JEF United Chiba)
19	MF	JPN	Takaya Kimura
20	MF	JPN	Sora Igawa (on loan from Consadole Sapporo)
21	GK	JPN	Taiki Yamada (on loan from Kashima Antlers)

No.	Pos.	Nation	Player
22	MF	JPN	Kodai Sano
23	DF	NED	Jordy Buijs
25	MF	JPN	Tatsuhiko Noguchi
27	MF	JPN	Yosuke Kawai
30	MF	JPN	Kyoya Yamada
31	GK	JPN	Rissei Taniguchi
32	MF	JPN	Tomoya Fukumoto
33	MF	JPN	Nagi Kawatani (on loan from Shimizu S-Pulse)
34	DF	JPN	Yota Fujii ^{DSP}
38	FW	JPN	Ryo Nagai
41	MF	JPN	Ryo Tabei (on loan from Yokohama FC)
42	MF	JPN	Ryo Takahashi
43	DF	JPN	Yoshitake Suzuki
44	MF	JPN	Taishi Semba
48	FW	JPN	Isa Sakamoto (on loan from Gamba Osaka)
99	FW	BRA	Lucão

=== Out on loan ===
Note: Flags indicate national team as defined under FIFA eligibility rules; some limited exceptions apply. Players may hold more than one non-FIFA nationality.

No.	Pos.	Nation	Player
—	DF	JPN	Kaito Abe (on loan at Blaublitz Akita)
—	DF	JPN	Wakaba Shimoguchi (on loan at FC Imabari)
—	DF	JPN	Koji Sugiyama (on loan at Verspah Oita)
—	MF	JPN	Kiwara Miyazaki (on loan at Iwaki FC)

No.	Pos.	Nation	Player
—	MF	JPN	Yuto Hikida (on loan at Ehime FC)
—	MF	JPN	Shinnosuke Matsuki (on loan at Verspah Oita)
—	FW	MAS	Hadi Fayyadh (on loan at Azul Claro Numazu)

== Transfers ==
=== In ===
Pos.	Player	Transferred from	Fee	Date	Source
MF	(Japan) Ryo Takahashi	(Japan) Shonan Bellmare	Free	9 January 2023	
FW	(Japan) Ryo Nagai	(Japan) Sanfrecce Hiroshima	Free	1 February 2023	
FW	(Brazil) Lucão	(Japan) Matsumoto Yamaga	Free	1 March 2023	

=== Out ===
Pos.	Player	Transferred to	Fee	Date	Source
GK	(Japan)	(Japan)			
GK	(Japan)	(Japan)			

== Pre-season and friendlies ==
Win Draw Loss Fixtures

2023 Friendly	Fagiano Okayama (Japan)	v	(Japan)	TBD
17:00

== Competitions ==
=== Overview ===
Competition	First match	Last match	Starting round	Record							
Competition	First match	Last match	Starting round	Pld	W	D	L	GF	GA	GD	Win %
J2 League	February 2023	12 November 2023	Matchday 1	42	13	19	10	49	49	+0	30.95
Emperor's Cup	7 June 2023	12 July 2023	Second round	2	1	0	1	2	3	−1	50.00
Total				44	14	19	11	51	52	−1	31.82

Last updated: May 2023
Source: Soccerway

=== J2 League ===
==== League table ====
Pos	Team	Pld	W	D	L	GF	GA	GD	Pts
8	Ventforet Kofu	42	18	10	14	60	50	+10	64
9	Oita Trinita	42	17	11	14	54	56	−2	62
10	Fagiano Okayama	42	13	19	10	49	49	0	58
11	Thespakusatsu Gunma	42	14	15	13	44	44	0	57
12	Fujieda MYFC	42	14	10	18	61	72	−11	52

Source: Meiji Yasuda J2 League, J.League Data Site
Rules for classification: 1) Points; 2) Goal difference; 3) Goals scored; 4) Head-to-head points; 5) Head-to-head goal difference; 6) Head-to-head goal scored; 7) Fair-play points.

==== Results summary ====
Overall								Home						Away					
Pld	W	D	L	GF	GA	GD	Pts	W	D	L	GF	GA	GD	W	D	L	GF	GA	GD
42	13	19	10	49	49	0	58	8	7	6	26	26	0	5	12	4	23	23	0

Last updated: January 2024.
Source: Worldfootball

==== Results by round ====
Round	1	2	3	4	5	6	7	8	9	10	11	12
Ground	A	H	A	H	H	A	H	A	H	A	H	A
Result	W	D	D	W	L	D	D	D	D	D	D	W
Position	1	5	7	4	5	6	8	9	10	11	12	10

Updated to match(es) played on May 2023. Source: Worldfootball
A = Away; H = Home; W = Win; D = Draw; L = Loss

==== Matches ====
The league fixtures were announced on 20 January 2023.

18 February 2023 1	Jubilo Iwata	2-3	Fagiano Okayama	Iwata
14:00 JST (UTC+9)	Goto 89, Goto 90+2		Sakuragawa 26, Sakamoto 31, Sano 54	Stadium: Yamaha Stadium; Attendance: 10,737; Referee: Shu Kawamata

=== Emperor's Cup ===
7 June 2023 Second round	Fagiano Okayama	2-1	Giravanz Kitakyushu	Okayama
19:00 JST (UTC+9)	Sakuragawa 45+1', 52'		Hirahara 78'	Stadium: City Light Stadium; Attendance: 2,564; Referee: Shuhei Ishimaru

12 July 2023 Third round	Shonan Bellmare	2-0	Fagiano Okayama	Okayama
19:00 JST (UTC+9)	Suzuki 73', Ishii 88'			Stadium: City Light Stadium; Attendance: 3,216; Referee: Hajime Matsuo
