= 2017 Emperor's Cup =

Tournament details
- Country: Japan
- Dates: 22 April 2017 – 1 January 2018
- Teams: 88

Final positions
- Champions: Cerezo Osaka (4th title)
- Runners-up: Yokohama F. Marinos

Tournament statistics
- Matches played: 87
- Goals scored: 292 (3.36 per match)
- Attendance: 313,782 (3,607 per match)
- Top goal scorer(s): Hugo Vieira, Seiya Nakano (5 goals each)

The 97th Emperor's Cup (第97回天皇杯全日本サッカー選手権大会) was the 2017 edition of the annual Japanese national cup tournament, which began on 22 April 2017 and ended with the finals on 1 January 2018.

Cerezo Osaka won the tournament for the first time as a J.League club. It had won the cup 43 years ago, in 1974 when the club was playing for Japan Soccer League as Yanmar Diesel. As a result of this win, Cerezo automatically qualified to the group stage of the 2018 AFC Champions League.

== Calendar ==
Round	Date	Matches	Clubs	New entries this round
First Round	22, 23 April	24	47+1 → 24	47 prefectural cup winners; 1 Amateur Best Team
Second Round	21 June	32	24+40 → 32	18 J1 clubs; 22 J2 clubs
Third Round	12 July (2 August) (Note: The match between Vanraure Hachinohe and Nagoya Grampus was rain-interrupted on July 12; the match was continued from the point of stoppage (60th minute, with Nagoya Grampus leading 0–1) on 2 August.)	16	32 → 16	
Fourth Round	20 September	8	16 → 8	
Quarter-finals	25 October	4	8 → 4	
Semi-finals	23 December	2	4 → 2	
Final	1 January 2018	1	2 → 1	

From Third round up to Quarter-finals, the team playing in lower-tier of the league system (or lower ranked team if in same level) will have home advantage. Should the home team's stadium not fulfill requirements or the playing team is involved in 2017 AFC Champions League, organizers may assign other stadium instead.

== Participating clubs ==
88 clubs competed in the tournament. Clubs playing in the 2017 J1 League and 2017 J2 League received a bye to the second round of the tournament. The remaining teams entered in the first round.

2017 J1 League all clubs	2017 J2 League all clubs	Amateur Best Team	47 prefectural tournament winners	
Albirex Niigata; Cerezo Osaka; Hokkaido Consadole Sapporo; Gamba Osaka; Júbilo Iwata; Kashima Antlers; Kashiwa Reysol; Kawasaki Frontale; Omiya Ardija; Sagan Tosu; Sanfrecce Hiroshima; Shimizu S-Pulse; FC Tokyo; Urawa Red Diamonds; Vegalta Sendai; Ventforet Kofu; Vissel Kobe; Yokohama F. Marinos	Avispa Fukuoka; Ehime FC; Fagiano Okayama; FC Gifu; JEF United Chiba; Kamatamare Sanuki; Kyoto Sanga; FC Machida Zelvia; Matsumoto Yamaga FC; Mito HollyHock; Montedio Yamagata; Nagoya Grampus; Oita Trinita; Renofa Yamaguchi FC; Roasso Kumamoto; Shonan Bellmare; Thespakusatsu Gunma; Tokushima Vortis; Tokyo Verdy; V-Varen Nagasaki; Yokohama FC; Zweigen Kanazawa	Honda FC	Hokkaido: Norbritz Hokkaido; Aomori: Vanraure Hachinohe; Iwate: Grulla Morioka; Miyagi: Sony Sendai FC; Akita: Blaublitz Akita; Yamagata: FC Parafrente Yonezawa; Fukushima: Iwaki FC; Ibaraki: University of Tsukuba; Tochigi: Tochigi Uva FC; Gunma: Tonan Maebashi; Saitama: Tokyo International University; Chiba: Briobecca Urayasu; Tokyo: Kokushikan University; Kanagawa: YSCC Yokohama; Yamanashi: Nirasaki Astros; Nagano: AC Nagano Parceiro; Niigata: Niigata University of Health and Welfare; Toyama: Kataller Toyama; Ishikawa: Hokuriku University; Fukui: Saurcos Fukui; Shizuoka: Azul Claro Numazu; Aichi: FC Maruyasu Okazaki; Mie: Suzuka Unlimited FC; Gifu: Gifu Keizai University	Shiga: Biwako Seikei Sport College; Kyoto: Amitie SC Kyoto; Osaka: FC Osaka; Hyōgo: Banditonce Kakogawa; Nara: Nara Club; Wakayama: Arterivo Wakayama; Tottori: Gainare Tottori; Shimane: Matsue City FC; Okayama: Mitsubishi Mizushima FC; Hiroshima: SRC Hiroshima; Yamaguchi: Tokuyama University; Kagawa: R.Velho Takamatsu; Tokushima: FC Tokushima Celeste; Ehime: FC Imabari; Kōchi: Kochi United SC; Fukuoka: Giravanz Kitakyushu; Saga: Saga University; Nagasaki: MD Nagasaki; Kumamoto: Kumamoto Teachers SC; Ōita: Verspah Oita; Miyazaki: Miyazaki Sangyo-keiei University; Kagoshima: Kagoshima United FC; Okinawa: FC Ryukyu

== Schedule and results ==
All times given in UTC+09:00

=== First round ===
22 April 2017	Arterivo Wakayama	2–3 (a.e.t.)	FC Maruyasu Okazaki	Wakayama
13:00		Report		Stadium: Kimiidera Athletic Stadium; Attendance: 843; Referee: Masashige Abe

22 April 2017	Iwaki FC	8–2	Norbritz Hokkaido	Fukushima
13:00		Report		Stadium: Toho Stadium for Everyone; Attendance: 439; Referee: Kota Watanabe

23 April 2017	Giravanz Kitakyushu	10–0	R.Velho Takamatsu	Kitakyushu
13:00		Report		Stadium: Honjō Athletic Stadium; Attendance: 1,040; Referee: Mitsuru Ooya

23 April 2017	Nirasaki Astros	1–5	Briobecca Urayasu	Kofu
13:00		Report		Stadium: Yamanashi Chuo Bank Stadium; Attendance: 408; Referee: Takao Ueda

22 April 2017	AC Nagano Parceiro	1–0	Suzuka Unlimited FC	Nagano
13:00		Report		Stadium: Nagano U Stadium; Attendance: 1,848; Referee: Kazuyoshi Karashima

23 April 2017	FC Ryukyu	5–5 (a.e.t.) (3–5 p)	FC Imabari	Okinawa
13:00		Report		Stadium: Okinawa Athletic Stadium; Attendance: 882; Referee: Keigo Sendachi

23 April 2017	Verspah Oita	2–1	Kochi United SC	Ōita
13:00		Report		Stadium: Ōita Bank Dome; Attendance: 602; Referee: Masaki Kuniyoshi

23 April 2017	Honda FC	3–1 (a.e.t.)	Biwako Seikei Sport College	Hamamatsu
13:00		Report		Stadium: Honda Miyakoda Soccer Stadium; Attendance: 900; Referee: Yasuhiro Uchida

22 April 2017	Blaublitz Akita	1–2	Kokushikan University	Akita
13:00		Report		Stadium: Akigin Stadium; Attendance: 587人; Referee: Naoto Uehara

22 April 2017	Tonan Maebashi	1–0	Tokyo International University	Maebashi
13:00		Report		Stadium: Gunma Shikishima Soccer Stadium; Attendance: 568; Referee: Kentaro Uematsu

23 April 2017	YSCC Yokohama	1–2	University of Tsukuba	Hiratsuka
13:00		Report		Stadium: Shonan BMW Stadium Hiratsuka; Attendance: 461; Referee: Syuhei Ishimaru

22 April 2017	Miyazaki Sangyo-keiei University	2–1	Tokuyama University	Miyazaki
13:00		Report		Stadium: Miyazaki Athletic Stadium; Attendance: 310; Referee: Yuichi Hanakawa

23 April 2017	Grulla Morioka	2–0	Sony Sendai FC	Morioka
13:00		Report		Stadium: Iwate Athletic Stadium; Attendance: 394; Referee: Dai Matsumoto

22 April 2017	Hokuriku University	0–2 (a.e.t.)	Banditonce Kakogawa	Kanazawa
13:00		Report		Stadium: Kanazawa Soccer Stadium; Attendance: 228; Referee: Syo Yanagida

22 April 2017	Gifu Keizai University	1–3	Niigata University of Health and Welfare	Gifu
13:00		Report		Stadium: Gifu Memorial Center Nagaragawa Ball Field; Attendance: 363; Referee: Toshihiro Nakai

23 April 2017	Kataller Toyama	1–0	Amitie SC Kyoto	Toyama
13:00		Report		Stadium: Toyama Athletic Stadium; Attendance: 1,051; Referee: Kenshi Uda

22 April 2017	FC Osaka	4–1	Saga University	Osaka
14:00		Report		Stadium: Yanmar Stadium Nagai; Attendance: 415; Referee: Taiki Tsuruoka

22 April 2017	Azul Claro Numazu	1–0	Saurcos Fukui	Numazu
13:00		Report		Stadium: Shizuoka Ashitaka Athletic Stadium; Attendance: 1,102; Referee: Yunosuke Kanetsugu

22 April 2017	Tochigi Uva FC	6–1	Parafrente Yonezawa	Utsunomiya
13:00		Report		Stadium: Tochigi Green Stadium; Attendance: 297; Referee: Hiroki Kasahara

22 April 2017	Nara Club	0–1 (a.e.t.)	Vanraure Hachinohe	Nara
13:00		Report		Stadium: Naraden Field; Attendance: 367; Referee: Shingo Kuniyoshi

23 April 2017	SRC Hiroshima	1–0	Mitsubishi Mizushima FC	Fukuyama
14:00		Report		Stadium: Fukuyama Takegahana Stadium; Attendance: 511; Referee: Keisuke Nobori

23 April 2017	Gainare Tottori	0–1	Kagoshima United FC	Tottori
13:00		Report		Stadium: Tottori Bank Bird Stadium; Attendance: 1,311; Referee: Syu Kawamata

23 April 2017	Kumamoto Teachers	0–4	Matsue City FC	Kumamoto
19:00		Report		Stadium: Egao Kenko Stadium; Attendance: 585; Referee: Kakuro Hori

22 April 2017	FC Tokushima Celeste	1–2	MD Nagasaki	Naruto
13:00		Report		Stadium: Pocarisweat Stadium; Attendance: 254; Referee: Naoki Wakatsuki

=== Second round ===
21 June 2017	Kashima Antlers	5–0	FC Maruyasu Okazaki	Kashima
19:00		Report		Stadium: Kashima Soccer Stadium; Attendance: 2,273; Referee: Takuto Okabe

21 June 2017	Montedio Yamagata	1–0 (a.e.t.)	V-Varen Nagasaki	Tendō
19:00		Report		Stadium: ND Soft Stadium Yamagata; Attendance: 1,887; Referee: Tomokazu Sato

21 June 2017	Hokkaido Consadole Sapporo	2–5 (a.e.t.)	Iwaki FC	Sapporo
19:00		Report		Stadium: Sapporo Atsubetsu Park Stadium; Attendance: 1,674; Referee: Minoru Tōjō

21 June 2017	Shimizu S-Pulse	4–1	Giravanz Kitakyushu	Shizuoka
19:00		Report		Stadium: IAI Stadium Nihondaira; Attendance: 1,623; Referee: Hiroyuki Kimura

21 June 2017	Kashiwa Reysol	1–0	Briobecca Urayasu	Kashiwa
19:00		Report		Stadium: Hitachi Kashiwa Soccer Stadium; Attendance: 2,577; Referee: Yoshiro Imamura

21 June 2017	FC Machida Zelvia	2–4	Oita Trinita	Machida
19:00		Report		Stadium: Machida Athletic Stadium; Attendance: 931; Referee: Shoichiro Mikami

21 June 2017	FC Tokyo	1–1 (a.e.t.) (4–5 p)	AC Nagano Parceiro	Chōfu
19:00		Report		Stadium: Ajinomoto Stadium; Attendance: 4,193; Referee: Hiroyoshi Takayama

21 June 2017	Fagiano Okayama	0–0 (a.e.t.) (5–3 p)	FC Imabari	Okayama
19:00		Report		Stadium: City Light Stadium; Attendance: 2,564; Referee: Dai Matsumoto

21 June 2017	Gamba Osaka	3–0	Verspah Oita	Suita
19:00		Report		Stadium: Suita City Football Stadium; Attendance: 3,597; Referee: Hirokazu Otsubo

21 June 2017	JEF United Chiba	1–0	Tokyo Verdy	Chiba
19:00		Report		Stadium: Fukuda Denshi Arena; Attendance: 2,404; Referee: Kazuyoshi Enomoto

21 June 2017	Júbilo Iwata	2–2 (a.e.t.) (5–4 p)	Honda FC	Iwata
19:00		Report		Stadium: Yamaha Stadium; Attendance: 4,180; Referee: Koichiro Fukushima

21 June 2017	Shonan Bellmare	1–0 (a.e.t.)	Kokushikan University	Hiratsuka
19:00		Report		Stadium: Shonan BMW Stadium Hiratsuka; Attendance: 1,320; Referee: Genki Tawara

21 June 2017	Omiya Ardija	3–0	Tonan Maebashi	Saitama
19:00		Report		Stadium: NACK5 Stadium Omiya; Attendance: 1,874; Referee: Kazuya Fujita

21 June 2017	Ehime FC	2–1	Kamatamare Sanuki	Matsuyama
19:00		Report		Stadium: Ningineer Stadium; Attendance: 798; Referee: Nobutsugu Murakami

21 June 2017	Vegalta Sendai	2–3	University of Tsukuba	Sendai
19:00		Report		Stadium: Yurtec Stadium Sendai; Attendance: 2,017; Referee: Ryosuke Yamaoka

21 June 2017	Avispa Fukuoka	4–2	Miyazaki Sangyo-keiei University	Fukuoka
19:00		Report		Stadium: Level5 Stadium; Attendance: 1,249; Referee: Leo Tanaka

21 June 2017	Urawa Red Diamonds	3–2	Grulla Morioka	Saitama
19:00		Report		Stadium: Urawa Komaba Stadium; Attendance: 5,038; Referee: Futoshi Nakamura

21 June 2017	Mito HollyHock	1–2 (a.e.t.)	Roasso Kumamoto	Mito
19:00		Report		Stadium: K's denki Stadium Mito; Attendance: 968; Referee: Hayato Shimizu

21 June 2017	Albirex Niigata	2–1 (a.e.t.)	Banditonce Kakogawa	Niigata
19:00		Report		Stadium: Denka Big Swan Stadium; Attendance: 2,338; Referee: Toru Kakinuma

21 June 2017	Cerezo Osaka	2–0	Niigata University of Health and Welfare	Osaka
19:00		Report		Stadium: Kincho Stadium; Attendance: 2,194; Referee: Yosuke Kubota

21 June 2017	Vissel Kobe	3–1	Kataller Toyama	Kobe
19:00		Report		Stadium: Kobe Universiade Memorial Stadium; Attendance: 1,805; Referee: Yuichi Nishimura

21 June 2017	Zweigen Kanazawa	2–0	Yokohama FC	Kanazawa
19:00		Report		Stadium: Ishikawa Athletics Stadium; Attendance: 1,103; Referee: Hajime Matsuo

21 June 2017	Yokohama F. Marinos	3–1	FC Osaka	Yokohama
19:00		Report		Stadium: Nippatsu Mitsuzawa Stadium; Attendance: 2,468; Referee: Masaaki Iemoto

21 June 2017	Kyoto Sanga	0–1	Azul Claro Numazu	Kyoto
19:00		Report		Stadium: Nishikyogoku Athletic Stadium; Attendance: 1,067; Referee: Ryo Tanimoto

21 June 2017	Kawasaki Frontale	2–0	Tochigi Uva FC	Kawasaki
19:00		Report		Stadium: Todoroki Athletics Stadium; Attendance: 4,155; Referee: Jumpei Iida

21 June 2017	Renofa Yamaguchi FC	1–2	Thespakusatsu Gunma	Yamaguchi
19:00		Report		Stadium: Yamaguchi Ishin Park Stadium; Attendance: 2,015; Referee: Yudai Yamamoto

21 June 2017	Ventforet Kofu	0–1	Vanraure Hachinohe	Kofu
19:00		Report		Stadium: Yamanashi Chuo Bank Stadium; Attendance: 1,376; Referee: Ryuji Sato

21 June 2017	Nagoya Grampus	6–0	SRC Hiroshima	Nagoya
19:00		Report		Stadium: Paloma Mizuho Stadium; Attendance: 2,268; Referee: Taku Nagaya

21 June 2017	Sanfrecce Hiroshima	3–2	Kagoshima United FC	Fukuyama
18:00		Report		Stadium: Fukuyama Takegahana Stadium; Attendance: 2,532; Referee: Yusuke Araki

21 June 2017	Tokushima Vortis	0–3	FC Gifu	Naruto
19:00		Report		Stadium: Pocarisweat Stadium; Attendance: 1,108; Referee: Hiromichi Oka

21 June 2017	Sagan Tosu	3–0	Matsue City FC	Tosu
19:00		Report		Stadium: Best Amenity Stadium; Attendance: 2,152; Referee: Tetsuro Yoshida

21 June 2017	Matsumoto Yamaga FC	4–0	MD Nagasaki	Matsumoto
19:00		Report		Stadium: Matsumotodaira Football Stadium; Attendance: 3,368; Referee: Hiroki Kasahara

=== Third round ===
12 July 2017	Kashima Antlers	5–0	Montedio Yamagata	Tendō
19:00	Nishi 4'; Suzuki 49'; Leandro 54'; Own goal 80' (o.g.); Nakamura 90+3'	Report		Stadium: ND Soft Stadium Yamagata; Attendance: 5,211

12 July 2017	Iwaki FC	0–2	Shimizu S-Pulse	Shizuoka
19:00		Report	Hasegawa 1'; Takeuchi 50'	Stadium: IAI Stadium Nihondaira; Attendance: 3,238

12 July 2017	Kashiwa Reysol	2–0	Oita Trinita	Ōita
19:00	Cristiano 54'; Diego Oliveira 60'	Report		Stadium: Ōita Bank Dome; Attendance: 3,715

12 July 2017	AC Nagano Parceiro	1–0	Fagiano Okayama	Nagano
19:00	Sato 64'	Report		Stadium: Nagano U Stadium; Attendance: 2,408

12 July 2017	Gamba Osaka	2–0	JEF United Chiba	Chiba
19:00	Fábio 33'; Izumisawa 55'	Report		Stadium: Fukuda Denshi Arena; Attendance: 8,048

12 July 2017	Júbilo Iwata	4–1	Shonan Bellmare	Hiratsuka
19:00	Ogawa 22'; Kawamata 45'; Ueda 57'; Takahashi 89'	Report	Omotehara 90'	Stadium: Shonan BMW Stadium Hiratsuka; Attendance: 3,123

12 July 2017	Omiya Ardija	3–2 (a.e.t.)	Ehime FC	Matsuyama
19:00	Shimizu 71'; Yamakoshi 119'; Esaka 120+3'	Report	Kondo 90', 111'	Stadium: Ningineer Stadium; Attendance: 924

12 July 2017	University of Tsukuba	2–1	Avispa Fukuoka	Mito
19:30	Nakano 69', 79'	Report	Ishizu 89'	Stadium: K's denki Stadium Mito; Attendance: 1,318

12 July 2017	Urawa Red Diamonds	1–0	Roasso Kumamoto	Saitama
19:00	Takagi 45+2'	Report		Stadium: Urawa Komaba Stadium; Attendance: 5,806

12 July 2017	Albirex Niigata	2–3 (a.e.t.)	Cerezo Osaka	Niigata
19:00	Shu Hiramatsu 24'; Rony 95'	Report	Yamaguchi 50'; Ricardo Santos 96'; Kimoto 113'	Stadium: Denka Big Swan Stadium; Attendance: 3,104

12 July 2017	Vissel Kobe	3–1	Zweigen Kanazawa	Kanazawa
19:00	Otsuki 17'; Ogawa 76'; Watanabe 86'	Report	Kaneko 64'	Stadium: Ishikawa Athletics Stadium; Attendance: 3,066

12 July 2017	Yokohama F. Marinos	4–2	Azul Claro Numazu	Yokohama
19:00	Kida 14'; Saito 43', 45+1'; Hugo Vieira 90+1'	Report	Sonoda 80'; Ota 90+4'	Stadium: Nippatsu Mitsuzawa Stadium; Attendance: 4,458

12 July 2017	Kawasaki Frontale	4–0	Thespakusatsu Gunma	Maebashi
19:00	Morimoto 3'; Tasaka 44'; Moriya 61'; Ienaga 76'	Report		Stadium: Shoda Shoyu Stadium Gunma; Attendance: 3,010

2 August 2017	Vanraure Hachinohe	1–2	Nagoya Grampus	Nagoya
19:00	Murakami 70'	Report	Nagai 53'; Washington 85'	Stadium: Paloma Mizuho Stadium; Attendance: 3,913
Note: Match first played on 12 July 2017 but abandoned after during the second half due to a thunderstorm.

12 July 2017	Sanfrecce Hiroshima	2–1	FC Gifu	Gifu
19:00	Kudo 56'; Felipe Silva 61'	Report	Fukumura 21'	Stadium: Gifu Nagaragawa Stadium; Attendance: 2,649

12 July 2017	Sagan Tosu	1–2	Matsumoto Yamaga FC	Matsumoto
19:00	Aoki 78'	Report	Shichi 67'; Serginho 71'	Stadium: Matsumotodaira Football Stadium; Attendance: 5,037

=== Fourth round ===
20 September 2017	Matsumoto Yamaga FC	0–2	Vissel Kobe	Matsumoto
19:00		Report	Hashimoto 23'; Watanabe 81'	Stadium: Matsumotodaira Football Stadium; Attendance: 6,721; Referee: Y. Nishimura

20 September 2017	Urawa Red Diamonds	2–4	Kashima Antlers	Kumagaya
19:00	Zlatan 59'; Muto 69'	Report	Kanazaki 7', 51' (pen.); Nakamura 74'; Doi 90'	Stadium: Kumagaya Athletic Stadium; Attendance: 10,051; Referee: H. Takayama

20 September 2017	Cerezo Osaka	1–0	Nagoya Grampus	Nagoya
19:00	Fukumitsu 6'	Report		Stadium: Paloma Mizuho Stadium; Attendance: 6,560; Referee: Y. Imamura

20 September 2017	University of Tsukuba	0–2	Omiya Ardija	Kashima
19:00		Report	Shimizu 28' (pen.), 85'	Stadium: Kashima Soccer Stadium; Attendance: 2,429; Referee: H. Matsuo

20 September 2017	Yokohama F. Marinos	3–2 (a.e.t.)	Sanfrecce Hiroshima	Yokohama
19:00	Vieira 54' (pen.), 88', 120'	Report	Minagawa 7'; Felipe 14'	Stadium: Nippatsu Mitsuzawa Stadium; Attendance: 6,026; Referee: Y. Yamamoto

20 September 2017	AC Nagano Parceiro	0–1	Júbilo Iwata	Nagano
19:00		Report	Saito 52'	Stadium: Nagano U Stadium; Attendance: 6,276; Referee: H. Kimura

20 September 2017	Kawasaki Frontale	4–1	Shimizu S-Pulse	Kawasaki
19:00	Morimoto 8', 41', 49'; Eduardo 85'	Report	Duke 23'	Stadium: Todoroki Athletics Stadium; Attendance: 7,641; Referee: K. Fukushima

20 September 2017	Gamba Osaka	2–3	Kashiwa Reysol	Suita
19:00	Nagasawa 60'; Ideguchi 81'	Report	Cristiano 45', 52'; Koga 48'	Stadium: Suita City Football Stadium; Attendance: 5,324; Referee: R. Sato

=== Quarter-finals ===
25 October 2017	Vissel Kobe	1–1 (a.e.t.) (5–4 p)	Kashima Antlers	Kobe
19:00	Havenaar 90+4'	Report	Shoji 63'	Stadium: Kobe Universiade Memorial Stadium; Attendance: 5,186; Referee: H. Kimura
	Penalties
	Havenaar (penalty scored); Nílton (penalty scored); Watanabe (penalty scored); Fujita (penalty scored); Iwanami (penalty scored)		(penalty scored) Ogasawara; (penalty scored) Nishi; (penalty missed) Nakamura; (penalty scored) Misao; (penalty scored) Shoji

25 October 2017	Cerezo Osaka	2–0	Omiya Ardija	Osaka
19:00	Fukumitsu 23'; Sawakami 54'	Report		Stadium: Kincho Stadium; Attendance: 4,526; Referee: J. Iida

25 October 2017	Yokohama F. Marinos	1–0	Júbilo Iwata	Yokohama
19:00	81' (o.g.)	Report		Stadium: Nippatsu Mitsuzawa Stadium; Attendance: 9,696; Referee: M. Toma

25 October 2017	Kawasaki Frontale	0–1	Kashiwa Reysol	Kawasaki
19:30		Report	Cristiano 61'	Stadium: Todoroki Athletics Stadium; Attendance: 9,968; Referee: N. Murakami

=== Semi-finals ===
23 December 2017	Vissel Kobe	1–3 (a.e.t.)	Cerezo Osaka	Osaka
13:00	Omori 90'	Report	Mizunuma 90+1'; Kakitani 98'; Souza 114'	Stadium: Nagai Stadium; Attendance: 24,833; Referee: Y. Yamamoto

23 December 2017	Yokohama F. Marinos	2–1 (a.e.t.)	Kashiwa Reysol	Kawasaki
15:05	Ito 69'; Vieira 118'	Report	Lopes 11'	Stadium: Todoroki Athletics Stadium; Attendance: 20,696; Referee: J. Iida

=== Final ===
1 January 2018	Cerezo Osaka	2–1 (a.e.t.)	Yokohama F. Marinos	Saitama
14:40	Yamamura 65'; Mizunuma 95'	Report	Ito 8'	Stadium: Saitama Stadium 2002; Attendance: 42,029; Referee: M. Tojo
