= José Carabalí =

José Carabalí may refer to:

- José Carabalí (athlete) (born 1970), Venezuelan runner
- José Carabalí (footballer) (born 1997), Ecuadorian football player
