= Nigerians in Japan =

Nigerians in Japan 在日ナイジェリア人
Total population
- 4,807 (in December, 2025)

Regions with significant populations
- Tokyo, particularly Kabukichō

Languages
- English (Nigerian English), Igbo, Yoruba and other languages of Nigeria; Japanese

Nigerians in Japan (在日ナイジェリア人, Zainichi Naijeriajin) form a significant immigrant community. There are around 4,807 Nigerians living in the country. They mostly belong to the Nigerian Union in Japan, which is divided into sub-unions based on states of origin. The vast majority of Nigerians arrived in Japan from the mid-1980s onwards.

== Migration history ==
Nigerians and other West African migrants began coming to Japan in the mid-1980s as migrant workers. Legal migrants often enter via student visas, which allow them to work for a limited number of hours each week. As of 2017 Japan has significantly eased restrictions on skilled immigrants gaining permanent right-to-remain visas, making them a logical follow-on from student visas.

There are a number of organizations for Nigerian immigrants in Japan. The Nigerian Union in Japan, the oldest one, was founded in 1990. The Nigerian Union restarted twice, most recently in 2010. The Imo State Union, founded in 2002, replaced it to become the largest and most active, and has formally applied for non-profit status under Japanese law.

== Business and employment ==
Some Nigerian migrants during the 1980s found work in factories. Later, after the end of the Japanese asset price bubble reduced opportunities for such work, they shifted into the night-life industry in Tokyo's entertainment districts such as Kabukichō or Roppongi, a line of employment with a high level of public visibility. Many of the bars in these areas were previously owned by Chinese or Koreans, but during a police crackdown in 2002, closed down; Nigerians took advantage of the resulting business vacuum to open their own bars, and hired their fellow countrymen as workers. Many of the migrants working in this industry are in training for or have completed qualifications for professional positions such as engineering in institutions in their home countries or in Japan, but were unable to find any other kind of work in Japan suited to their level of education. There are many Nigerian organizations in Japan. Most are affiliated with the Houston, Texas USA-based Nigerian Union Diaspora (NUD), which is the umbrella Non-Governmental Organization (NGO) for the economic and political empowerment of the people of Nigerian descent outside Nigeria.

== In the media ==
From 2011 to 2016, American author Dreux Richard worked as The Japan Times' Special Correspondent covering the African community in Japan, publishing a series of feature articles on the Nigerian community in particular. The Japan Times' stories included coverage of civic organizations, cultural groups, religious institutions, the red light districts, marriage and family life, and claims of an emerging 'integration gap' separating well-integrated African immigrants from those struggling after arriving in Japan. Richard's book, 'Every Human Intention: Japan in the New Century' (2021), includes a lengthy account of the community's experiences.

== Death of Gerald 'Sunny' Okafor ==
In June 2019, long-term Igbo-Nigerian resident of Japan Gerald 'Sunny' Okafor starved to death during a hunger strike at the Omura Immigration Detention Center in Nagasaki. Although the government's investigation cleared the detention center of wrongdoing, subsequent investigations by journalists revealed severe administrative negligence by the detention center and Japan's immigration authorities, as well as a cover-up of this negligence carried out with the assistance of the Nigerian Embassy in Japan.

Sweeping immigration reforms proposed by the Japanese government for 2021 are based primarily on the government's controversial investigation of Mr. Okafor's death.

== Notable people ==
- Ado Onaiwu, football player
- Andy Ologun, K-1 kickboxer and mixed martial artist
- Bobby Ologun, gaijin tarento
- Louis Okoye, professional baseball player
- Powell Obinna Obi, football player
- Solomon Sakuragawa, football player
- Leo Kokubo, football player
- Joel Chima Fujita, football player
- Henry Heroki Mochizuki, football player

== See also ==
- Japan–Nigeria relations

== Bibliography ==
- Cybriwsky, Roman Adrian (2011), Roppongi Crossing: The Demise of a Tokyo Nightclub District and the Reshaping of a Global City, University of Georgia Press, ISBN 9780820338316
- 川田薫 [Kawada Kaoru] (2005), 東京の西アフリカ系出身者の生活戦術 : 六本木におけるサービス業従事者を事例として [Life tactics of West African migrants in Tokyo: a study of service-industry workers in Roppongi], 慶応義塾大学大学院社会学研究科紀要, 60: 71–92
- 川田薫 [Kawada Kaoru] (December 2008), ナイジェリア人移住者の生活と資本形成に関する日米比較——関東と米国テキサス州の移住者の事例から [USA-Japan comparison of life and capital formation among Nigerian migrants: based on migrants in Kanto and Texas], 日本で暮らす外国人 [Foreigners living in Japan], Intriguing Asia, vol. 117, Bensey Publishing, pp. 172–179, ISBN 978-4-585-10414-8, OCLC 294935624
  - Summary presentation available online: 川田薫 [Kawada Kaoru] (November 2008), 日本と米国におけるナイジェリア人移住者のコミュニティと資本形成に関する事例報告——関東地域と米国テキサス州の移住者からの聞き取り調査から [Community and capital formation among Nigerian migrants in Japan and the United States: based on research among migrants in Texas and Kanto] (PDF), Annual Meeting of the Japan Sociological Society, 81
- 和崎春日 [Wazaki Haruka] (March 2008), 滞日アフリカ人のアソシエーション設立行動と集会活動 [Group activities and association formation activities among Africans staying in Japan] (PDF), 名古屋大学文学部研究論集, 54: 1–19, archived from the original (PDF) on 2011-10-06
- ナイジェリア連邦共和国, 各国・地域情勢, Tokyo: Ministry of Foreign Affairs, Japan, 2010
- Richard, Dreux (2021), Every Human Intention: Japan in the New Century, Pantheon Books, ISBN 9781101871119
