= KennedyEgbus Mikuni =

Japanese-American footballer

Kennedy Egbus Mikuni 三國 ケネディエブス
Personal information
- Full name: Kenedeiebusu Mikuni
- Date of birth: 23 June 2000 (age 26)
- Place of birth: Tokyo, Japan
- Height: 1.92 m (6 ft 4 in)
- Position: Centre-back

Team information
- Current team: Avispa Fukuoka (on loan from Nagoya Grampus)
- Number: 20

Youth career
- Nobitome SSS
- –2012: Tokyo Nobidome FC
- 2013–2015: Aomori Yamada Junior High School
- 2016–2018: Aomori Yamada High School

Senior career*
Years	Team	Apps	(Gls)
2019–2023	Avispa Fukuoka	55	(1)
2021–2022	→ Tochigi SC (loan)	27	(0)
2024–	Nagoya Grampus	70	(2)
2026–	→ Avispa Fukuoka (loan)	0	(0)

International career^{‡}
2018	Japan U19	3	(0)
2019–	Japan U20	1	(0)
Medal record
Representing Japan
AFC U-19 Championship
Bronze medal – third place	2018 Indonesia
- * Club domestic league appearances and goals as of 10:45, 5 August 2026 (UTC) ‡ National team caps and goals as of 15:04, 4 June 2019 (UTC)

Kennedy Egbus Mikuni (三國 ケネディエブス, Mikuni Kenedeiebusu; born 23 June 2000) is a Japanese footballer who plays as a centre-back for J1 League club Avispa Fukuoka, on loan from Nagoya Grampus.

== Club career ==
=== Early career ===
Kennedy played high school football at the prestigious Aomori Yamada High School in Aomori, where he was scouted by many J.League clubs. Kennedy progressed both junior high and high school at Aomori between 2015 and 2018. In his first year at Aomori Yamada, he helped the school win the National Junior High School Soccer Tournament Final in 2015. Together with teammates Riku Danzaki, they were one of the key players to win the Outstanding Player Award of the tournament. Kennedy finished the tournament as the National Junior High School Soccer Tournament top scorer.

In the 2016 season, Kennedy played a small contributions for Aomori Yamada when the school won both the National High School Soccer Championship and Prince Takamado Trophy Championship. Having started out as a striker, Kennedy began playing as a center back in his third and final year of high school. Throughout 2017, online football outlet Gekisaka described him one of the players to watch.

In 2018, Kennedy helped the Aomori Yamada win Sanix Cup International Youth Tournament and National High School Soccer Championship Final. Following this, he was included for the National High School Soccer Championship Outstanding Player. Throughout 2018, his performance at Aomori Yamada, once again, was noticed by Gekisaka, who described him one of the players to watch.

=== Avispa Fukuoka ===
It was announced on 18 July 2018 that Kennedy would be joining Avispa Fukuoka ahead of the new season. He was given the number 20 shirt by the club. Kennedy made his Avispa Fukuoka debut in the opening game against FC Ryukyu and received 3 goals. In a follow–up match against V-Varen Nagasaki, Kennedy kept a clean sheet in a 0–0 draw. After missing two matches due to an injury, Kennedy returned to the starting line–up against Albirex Niigata and kept another clean, in a 2–0 win on 23 March 2019. He was given a first team chance under the management of Fabio Pecchia. In a match against Zweigen Kanazawa on 3 May 2019, Kennedy received a red card for a second bookable offence, in a 1–1 draw. He was losing possessions and giving away the ball that saw him substituted at half time, in a 1–1 draw against Yokohama FC on 7 April 2019. After two months away, Mikuni made his first appearance for Avispa Fukuoka, playing 120 minutes in a 2–1 win against Kagoshima United in the second round of the Emperor’s Cup. At the end of the 2019 season, he went on to make eleven appearances in all competitions. Following this, Kennedy went on an invitational trial with Italian side Juventus U23 for two weeks.

At the start of the 2020 season, Kennedy had his contract renewed with Avispa Fukuoka. After being absent from the first team, he scored on first appearance in a 1–1 draw against Ehime FC on 29 July. This was followed up by setting up an equalising goal in a 2–2 draw against Ventforet Kofu. In a match between Avispa Fukuoka and Mito HollyHock on 4 November, Kennedy played briefly against his older brother Stevia. However, Mikuni made only five starts for Avispa Fukuoka and found his playing time from the substitute bench. Despite making nineteen appearances and scoring once in all competitions, he helped the club promoted to J1 League.

Ahead of the 2021 season, Kennedy had his contract renewed with Avispa. On 3 March, he scored in a 3–2 loss against Consadole Sapporo in the group stage of the J. League Cup. Kennedy then made three starts, playing as a striker. Before going on loan to Tochigi SC in May, he made four appearances and scoring once in all competitions.

Following his loan spell, Kennedy made his first appearance of the 2022 season for Avispa Fukuoka in a 1–0 loss against Yokohama F. Marinos on 10 September. After making seven appearances in all competitions, he had his contract renewed with Fukuoka. Throughout the 2023 season, Kennedy made only twelve starts for Avispa and found his playing time mostly confined to the substitute bench. He then helped the club qualify for the J. League Cup knockout stage after winning the two remaining matches of the group stage against Albirex Niigata and Kashiwa Reysol. In a match against Vissel Kobe on 25 June 2023, Kennedy suffered an injury and was substituted in the 39th minute, as Avispa Fukuoka lost 3–0. After being sidelined for three months, he returned from injury, coming on as a 51st minute substitute, in a 2–0 win against FC Tokyo, as the club advanced to the semi–finals of the J. League Cup. Kennedy played in both legs of the semi–finals of the J. League Cup against Nagoya Grampus, as he helped the club won 2–0 on aggregate to advance to the final. However, he was left out of the squad in the J.League Cup final, as Avispa Fukuoka won 2–1 against Urawa Red Diamonds to win the tournament. At the end of the 2023 season, Mikuni made twenty–eight appearances in all competitions.

==== Tochigi SC (loan) ====
On 21 May 2021, Kennedy has been loaned out to J2 League side Tochigi SC for the rest of the 2021 season.

Kennedy made his debut for the club, starting the whole and kept a clean sheet, in a 3–0 win against Matsumoto Yamaga on 23 May 2021. This was followed up by helping Tochigi SC keep two clean sheets in the next two matches. Since joining Tochigi SC, Kennedy started in the centre–back position for the next two months. However, he was dropped to the substitute bench for the rest of the 2021 season after the club went on winless run for three months. At the end of the 2021 season, Mikuni made twenty–four appearances in all competitions.

Kennedy had his contract renewed with Avispa Fukuoka and was loaned out to Tochigi SC for the 2022 season. He made five appearances for the club before returning to his parent club on 10 August 2022.

=== Nagoya Grampus ===
On 25 December 2023, it was announced that Kennedy joined J1 League side Nagoya Grampus on a permanent transfer. He make his debut for the club on 23 March February in a 3–0 lost to Kashima Antlers. On 21 April, he scored his first goal for the club in a 2–1 win over Cerezo Osaka.

==== Avispa Fukuoka (loan) ====
In June 2026, Kennedy moved on loan back to Avispa Fukuoka ahead of the 2026–27 J1 League season.

== International career ==
Kennedy represented the Japan levels, when he was first called up to Japan U15 in February 2015 and appeared eight times.

In February 2016, Kennedy was called up to the Japan U16 squad, but did not play. Two years later, he was called up to the Japan U18 squad in June 2018. Kennedy made his Japan U18 debut, starting the whole game, in a 1–0 win against Czech Republic U18 on 14 June 2018. Two months later, he participated in the SBS Cup for Japan U18 side, where they finished as runners-up. On 4 September 2018, Kennedy scored in a friendly match, in a 2–0 win against Vietnam U19.

In October 2018, Kennedy was called up to the Japan U19 squad for the AFC U-19 Championship in Indonesia, becoming the only player from the High School Federation to be called up. He played three times for the Japan U19, as they made it through to the semi–finals and was eliminated by Saudi Arabia U19.

Having been called up to the Japan U20 squad and appeared in the practice match in April 2019, Kennedy was called up to the squad for the FIFA U-20 World Cup in Poland. He played once in the tournament, in a 0–0 draw against Italy U20 on 29 May 2019, as Japan were eliminated in the Round of 16.

== Personal life ==
Kennedy was born in the United States to a Nigerian father and a Japanese mother, and raised in Higashimurayama, a semi-rural western suburb of Tokyo. He was the second of six children and the second son born to his parents. Mikuni is the younger brother of SteviaEgbus Mikuni and they once made a promise together of playing together one day. He older brother, Stevia is currently playing his trade with Thai League 2 club Kasetsart.

Kennedy is good friends with Takefusa Kubo, having lived in Aomori.

== Career statistics ==
As of 5 August 2026

Appearances and goals by club, season and competition
Club	Season	League			National cup (Note: Includes Emperors Cup)		League cup (Note: Includes J.League Cup)		Total	
Club	Season	Division	Apps	Goals	Apps	Goals	Apps	Goals	Apps	Goals
Avispa Fukuoka	2019	J2 League	11	0	2	0	0	0	13	0
Avispa Fukuoka	2020	J2 League	19	1	0	0	0	0	19	1
Avispa Fukuoka	2021	J1 League	2	0	0	0	2	1	4	1
Avispa Fukuoka	2022	J1 League	5	0	0	0	2	0	7	0
Avispa Fukuoka	2023	J1 League	18	0	2	0	8	0	28	0
Avispa Fukuoka	Total		55	1	4	0	12	1	71	2
Tochigi SC (loan)	2021	J2 League	24	0	0	0	–		24	0
Tochigi SC (loan)	2022	J2 League	3	0	2	0	–		5	0
Tochigi SC (loan)	Total		27	0	2	0	0	0	29	0
Nagoya Grampus	2024	J1 League	35	2	1	0	8	1	44	3
Nagoya Grampus	2025	J1 League	25	0	4	0	2	0	31	0
Nagoya Grampus	2026	J1 (100)	10	0	0	0	0	0	10	0
Nagoya Grampus	Total		70	2	5	0	10	1	85	3
Avispa Fukuoka (loan)	2026–27	J1 League	0	0	0	0	0	0	0	0
Career total			152	3	11	0	22	2	185	5

== Honours ==
Nagoya Grampus

- J.League Cup: 2024
