= José Carabalí (footballer) =

Ecuadorian footballer (born 1997)

Personal information
- Full name: José Joel Carabalí Prado
- Date of birth: 19 May 1997 (age 29)
- Place of birth: Esmeraldas, Ecuador
- Position: Midfielder

Team information
- Current team: Universitario de Deportes
- Number: 27

Senior career*
Years	Team	Apps	(Gls)
2015	Everest	6	(0)
2016	Unibolívar	6	(0)
2017–2018	CEF Puerto Quito	72	(14)
2019	Atlético Santo Domingo	25	(0)
2020–2023	Universidad Católica	41	(2)
2023–2024	Orense S.C.	15	(1)
2024	Always Ready	13	(1)
2024–2025	Nagoya Grampus	0	(0)
2025-2026	Universitario de Deportes	43	(1)
2026-	Liga de Quito	12	(1)

International career^{‡}
2021–	Ecuador	4	(0)
- * Club domestic league appearances and goals as of 1 April 2021 ‡ National team caps and goals as of 26 January 2022

José Joel Carabalí Prado (born 19 May 1997) is an Ecuadorian professional football player. He plays for Liga Deportiva Universitaria in Ecuador's LigaPro Serie A.

== International career ==
He made his debut for Ecuador national football team on 29 March 2021 in a friendly against Bolivia.

== Honours ==
Nagoya Grampus

- 2024 J.League Cup

Universitario de Deportes

- Peruvian Primera División: 2025
