= Seiya Nakano =

Japanese footballer

Seiya Nakano 中野誠也
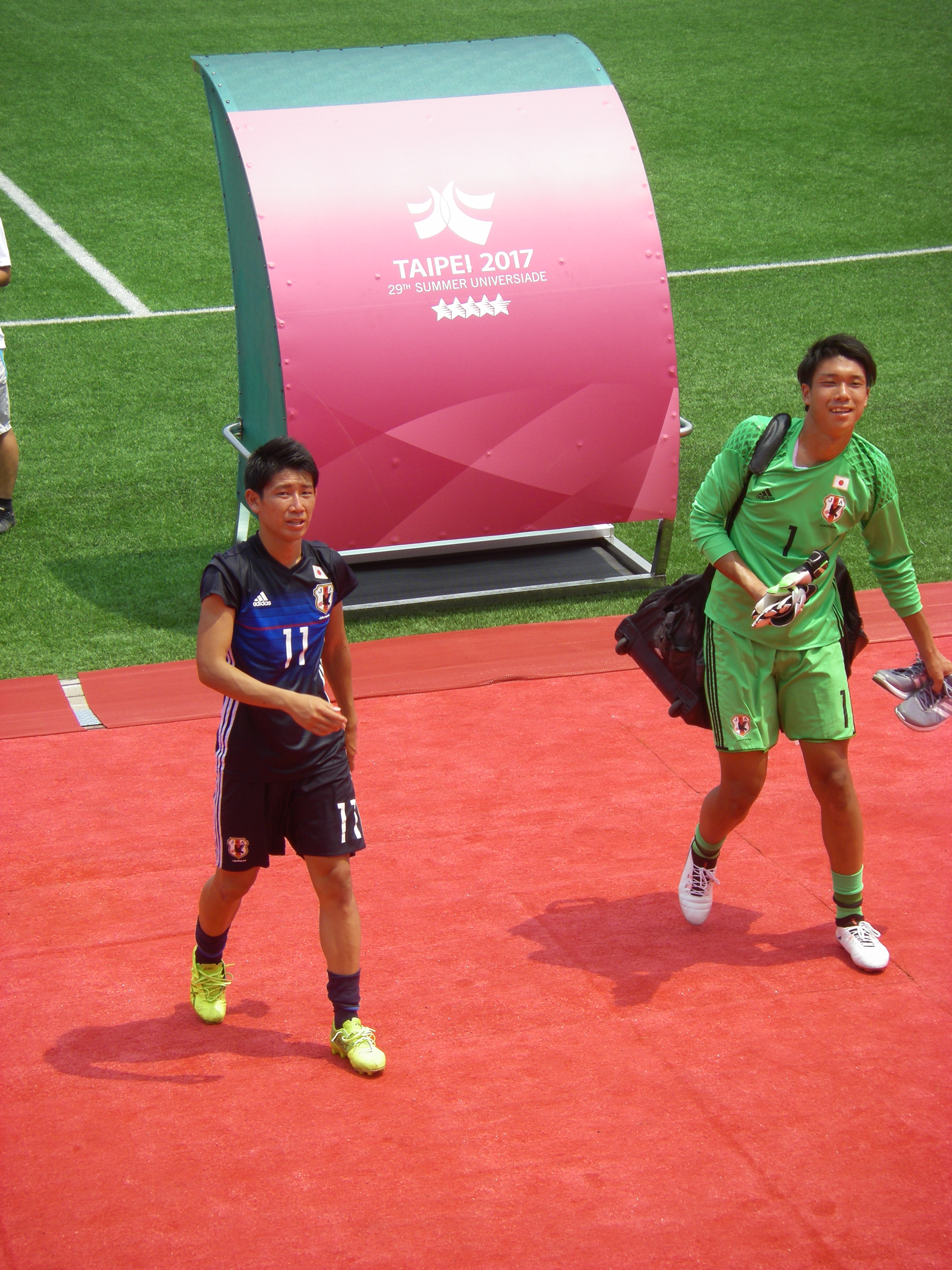
- Nakano (left) in 2017

Personal information
- Full name: Seiya Nakano
- Date of birth: 23 July 1995 (age 31)
- Place of birth: Hamamatsu, Japan
- Height: 1.72 m (5 ft 7 1/2 in)
- Position: Forward

Team information
- Current team: Vanraure Hachinohe
- Number: 99

Youth career
- 2008–2013: Júbilo Iwata

College career
Years	Team	Apps	(Gls)
2014–2017	University of Tsukuba		

Senior career*
Years	Team	Apps	(Gls)
2018–2021	Júbilo Iwata	43	(9)
2019–2020	→ Fagiano Okayama (loan)	24	(5)
2021–2026	RB Omiya Ardija	87	(16)
2024–2025	→ Azul Claro Numazu (loan)	7	(0)
2025–2026	→ Vanraure Hachinohe (loan)	54	(6)
2026–	Vanraure Hachinohe	0	(0)
- * Club domestic league appearances and goals as of 20:41, 10 June 2026 (UTC)

Seiya Nakano (中野誠也, Nakano Seiya; born 23 July 1995) is a Japanese professional footballer who plays as a forward for J2 League club Vanraure Hachinohe.

== Career ==
Born in Shizuoka Prefecture and raised by Júbilo Iwata's youth ranks, Nakano opted to join University of Tsukuba in 2014. He shone with that shirt, scoring five goals in the national cup and bringing the university to the round of 16 (after knocking out three professional teams, including J1 League side Vegalta Sendai).

Noticed by Júbilo Iwata, he opted to join the Shizuoka-based club as a special designed player in 2017. He made his professional debut in the 2018 season against Shimizu S-Pulse in J. League Cup, the same competition where he scored his first goals for Júbilo.

== Career statistics ==
As of match played 7 June 2026

Appearances and goals by club, season and competition
Club	Season	League			Emperor's Cup		J. League Cup		Other		Total	
Club	Season	Division	Apps	Goals	Apps	Goals	Apps	Goals	Apps	Goals	Apps	Goals
University of Tsukuba	2016	—	—		1	0	—		—		1	0
University of Tsukuba	2017	—	—		4	5	—		—		4	5
University of Tsukuba	Total		—		5	5	—		—		5	5
Júbilo Iwata	2018	J1 League	9	1	3	1	7	3	—		19	5
Júbilo Iwata	2019	J1 League	1	0	0	0	3	2	—		4	2
Júbilo Iwata	2020	J2 League	33	8	—		—		—		33	8
Júbilo Iwata	Total		43	9	3	1	10	5	—		56	15
Fagiano Okayama (loan)	2019	J2 League	24	5	2	1	0	0	—		26	6
RB Omiya Ardija	2021	J2 League	30	6	0	0	0	0	—		30	6
RB Omiya Ardija	2022	J2 League	22	6	0	0	0	0	—		22	6
RB Omiya Ardija	2023	J2 League	28	3	2	1	—		—		30	4
RB Omiya Ardija	2024	J3 League	7	1	1	0	1	0	—		9	1
RB Omiya Ardija	Total		87	16	3	1	1	0	—		91	17
Azul Claro Numazu (loan)	2024	J3 League	7	0	0	0	0	0	—		7	0
Vanraure Hachinohe (loan)	2025	J3 League	36	5	0	0	1	0	—		37	5
Vanraure Hachinohe (loan)	2026	J2/J3	18	1	—		—		—		18	1
Vanraure Hachinohe (loan)	Total		54	6	0	0	1	0	—		55	6
Career total			215	36	13	8	12	5	0	0	240	49
