= Gainare Tottori =

Association football club

Gainare Tottori ガイナーレ鳥取
- Full name: Sports Club Gainare Tottori
- Nickname: Gainare
- Founded: 1983; 43 years ago
- Stadium: Axis Bird Stadium; Tottori, Tottori
- Capacity: 16,033
- Chairman: Masaki Tsukano
- Manager: Kentaro Hayashi
- League: J3 League
- 2025: J3 League, 11th of 20
- Website: gainare.co.jp
Home colours	Away colours

Gainare Tottori (ガイナーレ鳥取, Gaināre Tottori) are a Japanese football club, based in Tottori, capital of Tottori Prefecture. They play in the J3 League, the Japanese third tier of professional football league. Their team colour is green.

== Name origin ==
Their team name Gainare derives from the Tottori dialect word gaina meaning "great" and Italian sperare meaning "to hope".

Their team mascot was a Japanese horror anime character Ge Ge Ge no Kitaro created by Shigeru Mizuki, a native of Sakaiminato, Tottori.

== History ==
The club was founded in 1983 as Tottori Teachers' Soccer Club (鳥取教員団サッカー部 Tottori Kyōin Dan Sakkā Bu). They opened their gate to players with other professions in 1989, renaming themselves S.C. Tottori. They adopted their current name in 2007.

They were promoted to the Japan Football League after finishing runners-up in the 2001 Regional League play-off. Nonprofit organisation Yamatsumi Sports Club operate the club.

After defeating Arte Takasaki 1–0 on October 3, 2010, in their home stadium, at last they could secure JFL top four after failed attempts on two previous seasons. The confirmation from J. League about their promotion to J2 came on November 29. They won the JFL title on October 24, 2010, with five games remaining.

On the 2013 J2–J3 promotion/relegation playoff, Gainare Tottori lost by 2–1 to Kamatamare Sanuki on aggregate score, and ended up relegated to the newly launched J3 League (from now on the 3rd tier of professional league football) ahead of the 2014 season. The club spent three seasons at the J2 League, and has not returned since their relegation. They are also one of the four teams to have competed in J3 League every year since its inception.

== Stadiums ==
They play their home games mainly at Axis Bird Stadium in Tottori City. Tottori Soccer Stadium is the only stadium in San'in region that meets the J. League requirements.

In recent years, they also play some games at Fuse Athletic Park Stadium in Tottori City, Matsue Athletics Stadium in Matsue, Shimane Prefecture and Hamayama Athletic Park Stadium in Izumo, Shimane Prefecture.

== League and cup records ==
Champions	Runners-up	Third place	Promoted	Relegated

League														J. League Cup	Emperor's Cup
Season	Div.	Tier	Teams	Pos.	P	W	D	L	F	A	GD	Pts	Attendance/G	J. League Cup	Emperor's Cup
SC Tottori
2006	JFL	3	18	11th	34	7	15	12	61	62	-1	36	1,146	Not eligible	2nd round
Gainare Tottori
2007	JFL	3	18	14th	34	10	9	15	42	51	-9	39	1,755	Not eligible	2nd round
2008	JFL	3	18	5th	34	17	6	11	57	37	20	57	3,215	Not eligible	1st round
2009	JFL	3	18	5th	34	16	8	10	65	37	28	56	3,419	Not eligible	2nd round
2010	JFL	3	18	1st	34	24	5	5	64	31	33	77	3,489	Not eligible	2nd round
2011	J2	2	20	19th	38	8	7	23	36	60	-24	31	3,692	Not eligible	3rd round
2012	J2	2	22	20th	42	11	5	26	33	78	-45	38	3,133	Not eligible	3rd round
2013	J2	2	22	22nd	42	5	16	21	38	74	-36	31	4,097	Not eligible	2nd round
2014	J3	3	12	4th	33	14	11	8	34	25	9	53	3,069	Not eligible	2nd round
2015	J3	3	13	6th	36	14	8	14	47	41	6	50	1,932	Not eligible	2nd round
2016	J3	3	16	15th	30	8	6	16	30	47	-17	30	1,898	Not eligible	2nd round
2017	J3	3	17	17th	32	4	9	19	31	63	-32	21	1,559	Not eligible	1st round
2018	J3	3	17	3rd	32	15	8	9	61	47	14	53	2,657	Not eligible	2nd round
2019	J3	3	18	7th	34	14	8	12	49	59	-10	50	2,228	Not eligible	2nd round
2020 †	J3	3	18	5th	34	17	6	11	47	37	10	57	703	Not eligible	Did not qualify
2021 †	J3	3	15	12th	28	9	2	17	36	53	-17	29	1,186	Not eligible	2nd round
2022	J3	3	18	12th	34	12	5	17	55	56	-1	41	1,745	Not eligible	1st round
2023	J3	3	20	6th	38	14	14	10	57	52	5	56	2,131	Not eligible	1st round
2024	J3	3	20	14th	38	13	8	15	48	64	-16	47	2,434	2nd round	1st round
2025	J3	3	20	11th	38	15	6	17	44	49	-5	51	2,835	1st round	1st round
2026	J3	3	40	21st	18	6	5	7	20	24	-4	27	2,248	N/A	N/A
2026-27	J3	3	20	TBD	38									TBD	TBD

Key

- Pos. = Position in league; P = Games played; W = Games won; D = Games drawn; L = Games lost; F = Goals scored; A = Goals conceded; GD = Goals difference; Pts = Points gained
- Attendance/G = Average league home attendance
- † 2020 season attendance reduced by COVID-19 worldwide pandemic
- Source: J.League Data Site

== Honours ==
Gainare Tottori Honours
Honour	No.	Years
Japan Football League	1	2010
Chugoku Soccer League	1	2000

== Current squad ==
As of 1 August 2026

Note: Flags indicate national team as defined under FIFA eligibility rules; some limited exceptions apply. Players may hold more than one non-FIFA nationality.

No.	Pos.	Nation	Player
1	GK	JPN	Yuta Terasawa
2	MF	JPN	Itto Fujita
3	DF	JPN	Shawn van Eerden
4	DF	JPN	Seiya Nikaido
6	DF	JPN	Hayato Nukui
7	DF	JPN	Ryo Arai
8	MF	JPN	Atsuki Tojo
9	FW	JPN	Daiki Shinoda
10	FW	JPN	Naoto Miki
13	MF	JPN	Yusuke Shimizu (on loan from RB Omiya Ardija)
14	DF	JPN	Takumi Kawamura
15	MF	JPN	Tatsuya Kiuchi
16	MF	JPN	Yusaku Tasei
19	FW	JPN	Sōta Yamamoto

No.	Pos.	Nation	Player
20	DF	NZL	Marco Lorenz
21	MF	JPN	Shinya Yajima
22	FW	JPN	Ibuki Yoshida
24	FW	JPN	Kagetora Hoshi
27	MF	JPN	Kanaki Honbo
29	MF	JPN	Hinata Konishi
32	DF	KOR	Min Moon
34	DF	KOR	SangYeong Jeong
39	MF	JPN	Jun Katori
42	MF	JPN	Masaki Kaneura
47	GK	JPN	Ryo Momoi
55	DF	JPN	Haruki Oshima
77	DF	JPN	Seitaro Hashimoto
88	GK	USA	Anton Burns (on loan from Machida Zelvia)

=== Out on loan ===
Note: Flags indicate national team as defined under FIFA eligibility rules; some limited exceptions apply. Players may hold more than one non-FIFA nationality.

No.	Pos.	Nation	Player
—	DF	JPN	Koki Azumane (on loan at Aries Toshima)
—	DF	JPN	Taichi Matsumoto (on loan at Nankatsu SC)
35	FW	JPN	Yuto Hasegawa (at Belugarosso Iwami)
72	FW	KOR	Wonjun Cha (at FC Tiamo Hirakata)

== Coaching staff ==
Position	Name
Manager	(Japan) Kentaro Hayashi
First-team coach	(Japan) Daichi Niwa (Japan) Yuki Shimizu
Goalkeeper coach	(Japan) Tetsuya Higashi
Technical coach	(Japan) Shoma Kurata
Trainer	(Japan) Kiyoshi Otani (Japan) Takato Hiromori
Competent	(Japan) Atsumu Ugata
Side affairs	(Japan) Takuma Kawada

== Managerial history ==
Manager	Nationality	Tenure	
Manager	Nationality	Start	Finish
Yoji Mizuguchi	Japan	February 1, 2007	August 15, 2007
Witthaya Laohakul	Thailand	August 23, 2007	February 1, 2010
Takeo Matsuda	Japan	February 1, 2010	January 31, 2012
Hideo Yoshizawa	Japan	February 1, 2012	January 31, 2013
Norio Omura	Japan	December 7, 2013	August 12, 2013
Koji Maeda	Japan	August 12, 2013	January 31, 2014
Masanobu Matsunami	Japan	February 1, 2014	January 31, 2016
Tetsuji Hashiratani	Japan	February 1, 2016	January 31, 2017
Ryuzo Morioka	Japan	February 1, 2017	June 4, 2018
Daisuke Sudo	Japan	June 4, 2018	January 31, 2019
Riki Takagi	Japan	February 1, 2019	May 4, 2021
Kim Jong-song	North Korea	May 10, 2021	June 19, 2023
Kohei Masumoto (caretaker)	Japan	June 20, 2023	November 24, 2023
Kentaro Hayashi	Japan	December 8, 2023	current

== Kit evolution ==
Home kit - 1st
2007 - 2008	2009 - 2010	2011 - 2012	2013	2014
2015	2016	2017	2018	2019
2020	2021	2022	2023	2024
2025	2026 -			

Away kit - 2nd
2007 - 2008	2009 - 2010	2011 - 2012	2013	2014 - 2015
2016	2017	2018	2019	2020
2021	2022	2023	2024	2025
2026 -
