= Japan–Nigeria relations =

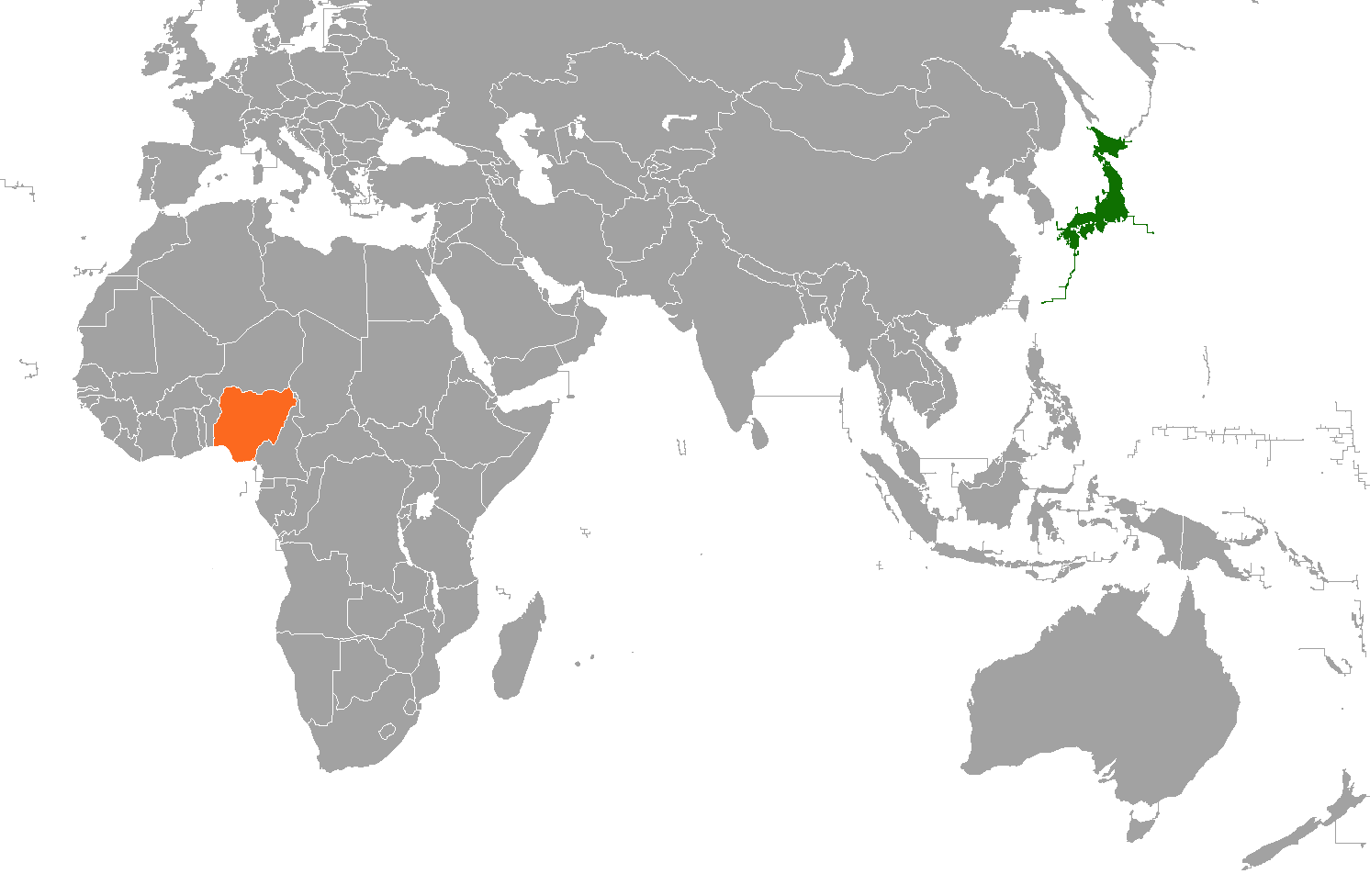

- Japan: Nigeria

Japan–Nigeria relations are the bilateral relations between Japan and Nigeria. Japan has an embassy in Abuja and the Federal Republic of Nigeria has an embassy in Tokyo.

== History ==
Japan recognized Nigeria as a nation on 1 October 1960, by formally establishing diplomatic relations between the two countries. Politicians of both countries have visited each other's countries to strengthen economic ties such as the 2001 visit of Yoshiro Mori and the 2001 and 2004 visit of Olusegun Obasanjo along with a 2009 visit from the then future president of Nigeria, Goodluck Johnathan. Muhammadu Buhari visited Japan in 2019.

== Trade ==
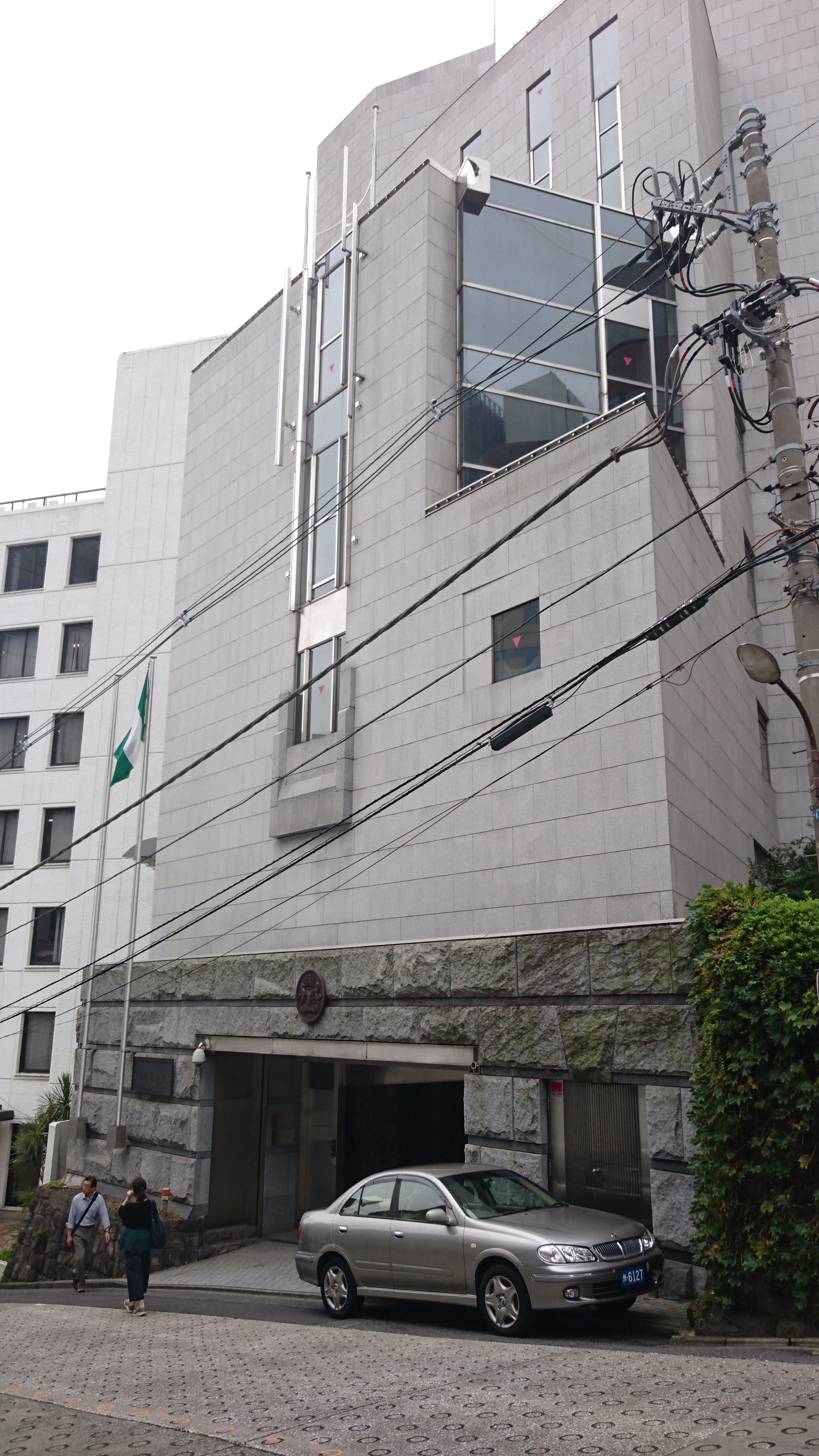
Embassy of Nigeria in Tokyo

Trade between the two nations exceeded 99,000 Million Yen or about $902 Million in 2015. Japan and Nigeria have looked into developing further trade ties by creating organizations such as the Japan-Nigeria Business Facilitation Council. It was formed during the 7th annual Tokyo International Conference for African Development (TICAD) in Tokyo. Due to Nigeria's large economic size, oil industries and burgeoning economy, several Japanese companies have taken an interest in investing into Nigeria as a hub for Japanese interests in West Africa and Africa as a whole. The main exports of Nigeria to Japan are Crude Oil, Petroleum Products, Cocoa and Cashew Nuts while the main exports of Japan to Nigeria is machinery, vehicles, and chemical products. In 2018, Japan External Trade Organization showcased over 30 Japanese Brands to Nigerian businessmen to facilitate a common interest in selling Japanese products to Nigerian consumers

== Immigration ==
There are over 2,700 Nigerians living in Japan, the majority of whom live in Tokyo or Kyoto.

== Resident diplomatic missions ==
- Japan has an embassy in Abuja.
- Nigeria has an embassy in Tokyo.

== See also ==
- Foreign relations of Japan
- Foreign relations of Nigeria
- Nigerians in Japan
- Japanese foreign policy on Africa
