= Keiya Shiihashi =

Japanese footballer (born 1997)

Keiya Shiihashi 椎橋 慧也
Personal information
- Full name: Keiya Shiihashi
- Date of birth: June 20, 1997 (age 29)
- Place of birth: Funabashi, Chiba, Japan
- Height: 1.78 m (5 ft 10 in)
- Positions: Defensive midfielder; centre back

Team information
- Current team: Avispa Fukuoka (on loan from Nagoya Grampus)
- Number: 34

Youth career
- 2013–2015: Ichiritsu Funabashi High School

Senior career*
Years	Team	Apps	(Gls)
2016–2020	Vegalta Sendai	71	(2)
2021–2023	Kashiwa Reysol	93	(3)
2024–2026	Nagoya Grampus	66	(3)
2026	→ Avispa Fukuoka (loan)	11	(0)
2026–	Avispa Fukuoka	1	(0)
Medal record
Vegalta Sendai
Runner-up	Emperor's Cup	2018
- * Club domestic league appearances and goals as of 12 August 2026

Keiya Shiihashi (椎橋 慧也, Shiihashi Keiya; born June 20, 1997) is a Japanese professional footballer who plays as a defensive midfielder or a centre back for J1 League club Avispa Fukuoka, on loan from Nagoya Grampus.

== Career ==
Shiihashi joined J1 League club Vegalta Sendai in 2016. On April 26, 2017, he debuted in J.League Cup (v Shimizu S-Pulse).

In December 2023, it was announced that Shiihashi would be joining Nagoya Grampus for the 2024 season.

== Personal life ==
On February 1, 2025, Shiihashi and actress Lisa Oda jointly announced their marriage on Instagram and revealed that they got married in December of last year.

== Club statistics ==
As of 30 April 2026.

Appearances and goals by club, season and competition
Club	Season	League			National cup (Note: Includes Emperors Cup)		League cup (Note: Includes J.League Cup)		Total	
Club	Season	Division	Apps	Goals	Apps	Goals	Apps	Goals	Apps	Goals
Vegalta Sendai	2017	J1 League	9	1	1	0	6	1	16	2
Vegalta Sendai	2018	J1 League	17	0	3	0	4	0	24	0
Vegalta Sendai	2019	J1 League	12	0	2	0	2	0	16	0
Vegalta Sendai	2020	J1 League	33	1	0	0	0	0	33	1
Vegalta Sendai	Total		71	2	6	0	12	1	89	3
Kashiwa Reysol	2021	J1 League	30	2	1	0	5	0	36	2
Kashiwa Reysol	2022	J1 League	31	1	3	1	3	0	37	2
Kashiwa Reysol	2023	J1 League	32	0	4	1	4	0	40	1
Kashiwa Reysol	Total		93	3	8	2	12	0	113	5
Nagoya Grampus	2024	J1 League	34	1	1	0	9	1	44	2
Nagoya Grampus	2025	J1 League	28	2	3	0	2	0	33	2
Nagoya Grampus	2026	J1 (100)	4	0	0	0	0	0	4	0
Nagoya Grampus	Total		66	3	4	0	11	1	81	4
Avispa Fukuoka (loan)	2026	J1 (100)	5	0	–		–		5	0
Career total			235	8	18	2	35	2	288	12

== Honours ==
Individual

- Toulon Tournament Best XI: 2019

Club

- J.League Cup: 2024
