= Takato Nonomura =

Japanese footballer

Personal information
- Date of birth: 13 May 1998 (age 28)
- Place of birth: Shiga, Japan
- Height: 1.83 m (6 ft 0 in)
- Position: Defender

Team information
- Current team: Blaublitz Akita
- Number: 17

Youth career
- 2014–2016: Ayaha High School

College career
Years	Team	Apps	(Gls)
2017–2020	Ryutsu Keizai University		

Senior career*
Years	Team	Apps	(Gls)
2018	RKD Ryugasaki	9	(0)
2021–2025	Matsumoto Yamaga	129	(10)
2026–	Blaublitz Akita	10	(1)
- * Club domestic league appearances and goals as of 14 August 2026

Takato Nonomura (野々村 鷹人, Nonomura Takato; born 13 May 1998) is a Japanese footballer currently playing as a defender for Blaublitz Akita.

== Career statistics ==
=== Club ===
As of 7 March 2021.

Club	Season	League			National Cup		League Cup		Other		Total	
Club	Season	Division	Apps	Goals	Apps	Goals	Apps	Goals	Apps	Goals	Apps	Goals
RKD Ryugasaki	2018	JFL	9	0	2 (Note: Appearances in the Emperor's Cup)	0	–		0	0	11	0
Ryutsu Keizai University	2019	–			2	0	–		0	0	2	0
Matsumoto Yamaga	2021	J2 League	1	0	0	0	0	0	0	0	1	0
Career total			10	0	4	0	0	0	0	0	14	0
