= Itto Fujita =

Japanese footballer

Personal information
- Date of birth: 30 June 1999 (age 27)
- Place of birth: Yokohama, Kanagawa, Japan
- Height: 1.75 m (5 ft 9 in)
- Position: Right-back

Team information
- Current team: Gainare Tottori
- Number: 2

Youth career
- Azamino FC
- –2017: Yokohama F. Marinos

College career
Years	Team	Apps	(Gls)
2018–2021	Sendai University		

Senior career*
Years	Team	Apps	(Gls)
2022–2024	Roasso Kumamoto	55	(0)
2025–	Gainare Tottori	23	(1)
- * Club domestic league appearances and goals as of 24 August 2026

Itto Fujita (藤田 一途, Fujita Itto; born 30 June 1999) is a Japanese footballer who plays as a right-back for J3 League club Gainare Tottori.

== Career statistics ==
=== Club ===
As of 20 February 2022.

Club	Season	League			National Cup		League Cup		Other		Total	
Club	Season	Division	Apps	Goals	Apps	Goals	Apps	Goals	Apps	Goals	Apps	Goals
Sendai University	2019	–			2 (Note: Appearances in the Emperor's Cup)	0	–		0	0	2	0
Roasso Kumamoto	2021	J3 League	0	0	0	0	–		0	0	0	0
Roasso Kumamoto	2022	J2 League	1	0	0	0	0	0	0	0	1	0
Roasso Kumamoto	Total		1	0	0	0	0	0	0	0	1	0
Career total			1	0	2	0	0	0	0	0	3	0
