= Kazuki Ota =

Japanese footballer

Kazuki Ota 太田 一輝
Personal information
- Full name: Kazuki Ota
- Date of birth: January 27, 1993 (age 33)
- Place of birth: Iwata, Shizuoka, Japan
- Height: 1.73 m (5 ft 8 in)
- Position: Midfielder

Youth career
- 2011–2014: Kanto Gakuin University

Senior career*
| Years | Team | Apps | (Gls) |
| 2015–2018 | Azul Claro Numazu | 91 | (9) |
- * Club domestic league appearances and goals as of 20 February 2019

Kazuki Ota (太田 一輝, Ota Kazuki; born January 27, 1993) is a Japanese football player. He plays for Azul Claro Numazu.

== Career ==
Kazuki Ota joined Japan Football League club Azul Claro Numazu in 2015.

== Club statistics ==
Updated to 20 February 2019.

| Club performance | | | League | | Cup | | Total | |
| Season | Club | League | Apps | Goals | Apps | Goals | Apps | Goals |
| Japan | | | League | | Emperor's Cup | | Total | |
|---|---|---|---|---|---|---|---|---|
| 2015 | Azul Claro Numazu | JFL | 9 | 0 | – | | 9 | 0 |
| 2016 | Azul Claro Numazu | JFL | 27 | 5 | – | | 27 | 5 |
| 2017 | Azul Claro Numazu | J3 League | 26 | 2 | 2 | 1 | 28 | 6 |
| 2018 | Azul Claro Numazu | J3 League | 29 | 2 | – | | 29 | 2 |
| Total | | | 91 | 9 | 2 | 1 | 93 | 10 |
