= Junya Imase =

Japanese footballer (born 1993)

Personal information
- Full name: Junya Imase
- Date of birth: January 3, 1993 (age 33)
- Place of birth: Ichihara, Chiba, Japan
- Height: 1.84 m (6 ft 1/2 in)
- Position: Defender

Team information
- Current team: Kataller Toyama
- Number: 5

Youth career
- 2008–2010: Ichiritsu Funabashi High School

College career
| Years | Team | Apps | (Gls) |
| 2011–2014 | Kokushikan University | | |

Senior career*
| Years | Team | Apps | (Gls) |
| 2015–2018 | Mito HollyHock | 62 | (1) |
| 2018 | → Kataller Toyama (loan) | 24 | (1) |
| 2019– | Kataller Toyama | 152 | (5) |
- * Club domestic league appearances and goals as of 16 August 2026

Junya Imase (今瀬 淳也, Imase Junya; born January 3, 1993 in Chiba) is a Japanese football player. He plays for Kataller Toyama.

== Playing career ==
Junya Imase joined to J2 League club Mito HollyHock in 2015.

== Club statistics ==
Updated to 23 February 2018.

| Club performance | | | League | | Cup | | Total | |
| Season | Club | League | Apps | Goals | Apps | Goals | Apps | Goals |
| Japan | | | League | | Emperor's Cup | | Total | |
|---|---|---|---|---|---|---|---|---|
| 2015 | Mito HollyHock | J2 League | 16 | 0 | 2 | 0 | 18 | 0 |
| 2016 | Mito HollyHock | J2 League | 20 | 1 | 1 | 0 | 21 | 1 |
| 2017 | Mito HollyHock | J2 League | 26 | 0 | 0 | 0 | 26 | 0 |
| Total | | | 62 | 1 | 3 | 0 | 18 | 0 |
