= Haruki Yoshida =

Japanese footballer

Personal information
- Date of birth: 20 April 2001 (age 25)
- Place of birth: Minamiuonuma, Niigata, Japan
- Height: 1.77 m (5 ft 10 in)
- Position: Defender

Team information
- Current team: Edo All United

Youth career
- –2013: FC Yamato Juniors
- 2014–2016: Nagaoka JYFC
- 2017–2019: Teikyo Nagaoka High School

Senior career*
Years	Team	Apps	(Gls)
2020–2023	Ehime FC	1	(0)
2022	→ Kochi United SC	2	(0)
2024–	Edo All United		
- * Club domestic league appearances and goals as of 10:41, 11 March 2025 (UTC)

Haruki Yoshida (吉田 晴稀, Yoshida Haruki; born 20 April 2001) is a Japanese footballer who played as a defender for Edo All United.

== Biography ==
Yoshida was born on 20 April 2001 in Minamiuonuma, Niigata Prefecture. He graduated from Muikamachi Middle School. At Teikyo Nagaoka High School, he played in a three-man back line due to team circumstances, in which he contributed 11 consecutive wins without conceding a goal, he helped the team advance to the semifinals of the 2019 All Japan High School Soccer Tournament in which Gekisaka described as "rewriting the history of Niigata Prefecture." He was described as "the fastest in Nagaoka" by their the team's coach. On 7 December 2019, he signed a contract with Ehime FC as a high school graduate. He started playing for Ehime FC on 2020, in which he played one match. He moved to Kochi United SC in 2022, in which he played two times. He did not play any matches in 2023 when he returned to Ehime FC. In November 2023, he announced that he would be playing for Edo All United in 2024.

== Career statistics ==
As of 28 March 2021

Appearances and goals by club, season and competition
Club	Season	League			National cup		League cup		Other		Total	
Club	Season	Division	Apps	Goals	Apps	Goals	Apps	Goals	Apps	Goals	Apps	Goals
Ehime FC	2020	J2 League	1	0	0	0	0	0	0	0	1	0
Ehime FC	2021	J2 League	0	0	0	0	0	0	0	0	0	0
Career total			1	0	0	0	0	0	0	0	1	0
