= Hinata Konishi =

Japanese footballer

Personal information
- Full name: Hinata Konishi
- Date of birth: 21 December 2001 (age 24)
- Place of birth: Nagano, Nagano, Japan
- Height: 1.60 m (5 ft 3 in)
- Position: Forward

Team information
- Current team: Gainare Tottori
- Number: 29

Youth career
- NPIC Herencia FC
- –2019: Nagano Parceiro

Senior career*
Years	Team	Apps	(Gls)
2020–2025	Nagano Parceiro	57	(3)
2026–	Gainare Tottori	2	(0)
- * Club domestic league appearances and goals as of 24 August 2026

Hinata Konishi (小西 陽向, Konishi Hinata; born 21 December 2001) is a Japanese footballer currently playing as a forward for Gainare Tottori.

== Early life ==
Hinata was born in Nagano. He played youth football for NPIC Herencia FC and Nagano Parceiro.

== Career ==
Hinata made his league debut for Nagano against Kamatamare Sanuki on the 3 October 2021. He scored his first goal for the club against Gainare Tottori on the 12 November 2023, scoring in the 47th minute.

== Career statistics ==
=== Club ===
As of 3 October 2021.

Club	Season	League			National Cup		League Cup		Other		Total	
Club	Season	Division	Apps	Goals	Apps	Goals	Apps	Goals	Apps	Goals	Apps	Goals
Nagano Parceiro	2021	J3 League	1	0	0	0	–		0	0	1	0
Career total			1	0	0	0	0	0	0	0	1	0
