= Ben Duncan =

Ben Duncan may refer to:

- Ben Duncan (soccer), Australian soccer player
- Ben Duncan (television personality)
