= Yuta Sato =

Japanese footballer

Personal information
- Full name: Yuta Sato
- Date of birth: 13 May 1995 (age 31)
- Place of birth: Kanagawa, Japan
- Height: 1.70 m (5 ft 7 in)
- Position: Midfielder

Team information
- Current team: Vanraure Hachinohe
- Number: 17

Youth career
- FC 80 Yokodai
- Buddy SC
- –2010: Yokohama F. Marinos
- 2011–2013: Maebashi Ikuei High School

College career
Years	Team	Apps	(Gls)
2014–2017	Senshu University		

Senior career*
Years	Team	Apps	(Gls)
2018–2021	YSCC Yokohama	79	(6)
2022–2024	AC Nagano Parceiro	55	(6)
2024-2025	FC Ryukyu	59	(1)
2026-	Vanraure Hachinohe	4	(2)
Total		197	(15)
- * Club domestic league appearances and goals as of 12 August 2026

Yuta Sato (佐藤 祐太, Satō Yūta; born 13 May 1995) is a Japanese footballer currently playing as a midfielder for Vanraure Hachinohe.

== Early life ==
Yuta played for FC80 Yokohama, Buddy SC, Yokohama F.Marinos, Maebashi Ikuei High School and Senshu University.

== Career ==
Yuta made his debut for YSCC on the 10 March 2019, coming on for Koya Okuda. He scored his first goal for YSCC against Azul Claro Numazu, scoring in the 70th minute.

Yuta made his debut for Nagano on the 13 March 2022 against Giravanz Kitakyushu. He scored his first goal for Nagano against Tegevajaro Miyazaki on the 24th of July 2022.

== Career statistics ==
=== Club ===
As of 13 November 2020.

Club	Season	League			National Cup		League Cup		Other		Total	
Club	Season	Division	Apps	Goals	Apps	Goals	Apps	Goals	Apps	Goals	Apps	Goals
YSCC Yokohama	2018	J3 League	0	0	0	0	–		0	0	0	0
YSCC Yokohama	2019	J3 League	24	2	0	0	–		0	0	24	2
YSCC Yokohama	2020	J3 League	23	2	0	0	–		0	0	23	2
Career total			47	4	0	0	0	0	0	0	47	4
