= Yuki Kawakami =

Japanese footballer (born 1997)

Personal information
- Date of birth: 18 July 1997 (age 29)
- Height: 1.84 m (6 ft 0 in)
- Position: Defender

Team information
- Current team: Kataller Toyama
- Number: 46

Youth career
- Matsunami SC
- Junior SC Yokohama
- 2013–2015: Yaita Chuo High School

College career
Years	Team	Apps	(Gls)
2016–2019	Meiji University		

Senior career*
Years	Team	Apps	(Gls)
2020–24	Thespakusatsu Gunma	44	(1)
2024-	Kataller Toyama	7	(0)
- * Club domestic league appearances and goals as of 1 January 2026

Yuki Kawakami (川上 優樹, Kawakami Yūki; born 18 July 1997) is a Japanese footballer currently playing as a defender for Kataller Toyama.

== Career statistics ==
=== Club ===
As of 24 August 2020.

Club	Season	League			National Cup		League Cup		Other		Total	
Club	Season	Division	Apps	Goals	Apps	Goals	Apps	Goals	Apps	Goals	Apps	Goals
Thespakusatsu Gunma	2020	J2 League	1	0	0	0	–		0	0	1	0
Career total			1	0	0	0	0	0	0	0	1	0
