= Koki Maezawa =

Japanese footballer

Koki Maezawa 前澤 甲気
Personal information
- Full name: Koki Maezawa
- Date of birth: March 21, 1993 (age 33)
- Place of birth: Shizuoka, Japan
- Height: 1.75 m (5 ft 9 in)
- Position: Midfielder

Team information
- Current team: Vanraure Hachinohe
- Number: 14

Youth career
- 2011–2014: Senshu University

Senior career*
Years	Team	Apps	(Gls)
2015–2016	Sony Sendai	38	(5)
2017–2020	Azul Claro Numazu	71	(5)
2021–	Vanraure Hachinohe	60	(6)
- * Club domestic league appearances and goals as of 29 August 2023

Koki Maezawa (前澤 甲気, Maezawa Koki; born March 31, 1993) is a Japanese football player who currently plays for Vanraure Hachinohe.

== Career ==
Koki Maezawa joined the Japan Football League club Sony Sendai in 2015. In 2017, he moved to the J3 League club Azul Claro Numazu.

== Club statistics ==
Updated to 20 February 2018.

Club performance			League		Cup		Total	
Season	Club	League	Apps	Goals	Apps	Goals	Apps	Goals
Japan			League		Emperor's Cup		Total	
2015	Sony Sendai FC	JFL	9	2	–		9	2
2016	Sony Sendai FC	JFL	29	3	1	0	30	3
2017	Azul Claro Numazu	J3 League	19	2	3	0	22	2
Total			57	7	4	0	61	7
