= Takashi Kondo (footballer) =

Japanese footballer (born 1992)

Takashi Kondo 近藤 貴司
Personal information
- Full name: Takashi Kondo
- Date of birth: April 26, 1992 (age 34)
- Place of birth: Tokyo, Japan
- Height: 1.67 m (5 ft 5 1/2 in)
- Position: Midfielder

Team information
- Current team: Nagano Parceiro
- Number: 8

Youth career
- SC Sixth
- –2010: Mitsubishi Yowa

College career
Years	Team	Apps	(Gls)
2011–2014	Waseda University		

Senior career*
Years	Team	Apps	(Gls)
2015–2019	Ehime FC	177	(25)
2020–2022	Omiya Ardija	15	(0)
2021	→ Ehime (loan)	40	(3)
2022	Ehime	29	(4)
2023–	Nagano Parceiro	107	(11)
- * Club domestic league appearances and goals as of 14:04, 23 October 2026 (UTC)

Takashi Kondo (近藤 貴司, Kondō Takashi; born April 26, 1992 in Tokyo) is a Japanese footballer who plays as a midfielder for J3 League club Nagano Parceiro.

== Club statistics ==
As of 21 October 2026.

Appearances and goals by club, season and competition
Club	Season	League			National cup (Note: Includes Emperor's Cup)		League cup (Note: Includes J.League Cup)		Other		Total	
Club	Season	Division	Apps	Goals	Apps	Goals	Apps	Goals	Apps	Goals	Apps	Goals
Ehime FC	2015	J2 League	34	6	3	0	–		1 (Note: Appearance in J1/J2 play-offs)	0	38	6
Ehime FC	2016	J2 League	29	1	3	1	–		0	0	32	2
Ehime FC	2017	J2 League	40	6	2	2	–		0	0	42	8
Ehime FC	2018	J2 League	32	6	0	0	–		0	0	32	6
Ehime FC	2019	J2 League	42	6	0	0	–		0	0	42	6
Ehime FC	Total		177	25	8	3	0	0	1	0	186	28
Omiya Ardija	2020	J2 League	15	0	–		–		–		15	0
Ehime FC (loan)	2021	J2 League	40	3	1	0	–		0	0	41	3
Ehime FC	2022	J3 League	29	4	0	0	–		0	0	29	4
Nagano Parceiro	2023	J3 League	29	4	2	0	0	0	–		31	4
Nagano Parceiro	2024	J3 League	30	3	2	0	1	2	–		33	5
Nagano Parceiro	2025	J3 League	19	0	0	0	1	0	–		20	0
Nagano Parceiro	2026	J2/J3 (100)	18	2	–		–		–		18	2
Nagano Parceiro	2026–27	J3 League	11	2	1	0	0	0	–		12	2
Nagano Parceiro	Total		107	11	5	0	2	2	0	0	114	13
Career total			368	43	14	3	2	2	1	0	385	48
