= Takaya Kimura =

Japanese footballer

Takaya Kimura 木村 太哉
Personal information
- Full name: Takaya Kimura
- Date of birth: 8 July 1998 (age 28)
- Place of birth: Tokyo, Japan
- Height: 1.75 m (5 ft 9 in)
- Position: Midfielder

Team information
- Current team: Fagiano Okayama
- Number: 27

Youth career
- Friendly SC
- –2013: Anfini Maki FC
- 2014–2016: Sapporo Otani High School

College career
Years	Team	Apps	(Gls)
2017–2020	Konan University		

Senior career*
Years	Team	Apps	(Gls)
2021–	Fagiano Okayama	182	(13)
- * Club domestic league appearances and goals as of 12 August 2026

Takaya Kimura (木村 太哉, Kimura Takaya; born 25 August 1998) is a Japanese footballer currently playing as a midfielder for Fagiano Okayama.

== Career statistics ==
=== Club ===
As of 6 December 2024.

Club	Season	League			National Cup		League Cup		Other		Total	
Club	Season	Division	Apps	Goals	Apps	Goals	Apps	Goals	Apps	Goals	Apps	Goals
Fagiano Okayama	2021	J2 League	42	2	2 (Note: Appearances in the Emperor's Cup)	0	—		—		44	2
Fagiano Okayama	2022	J2 League	19	0	0	0	—		0	0	19	0
Fagiano Okayama	2023	J2 League	28	2	2	0	—		—		30	2
Fagiano Okayama	2024	J2 League	38	2	1	0	2 (Note: Appearances in the J. League Cup)	1	2 (Note: Appearances in the J1 League play-off)	1	43	4
Career total			127	6	5	0	2	1	2	1	136	8
