= Yūdai Tanaka (footballer, born 1999) =

Japanese footballer

Yūdai Tanaka 田中 雄大
Personal information
- Full name: Yūdai Tanaka
- Date of birth: 14 December 1999 (age 26)
- Place of birth: Kanagawa, Japan
- Height: 1.62 m (5 ft 4 in)
- Position: Midfielder

Team information
- Current team: Sagan Tosu
- Number: 29

Youth career
- Minamiyurigaoka SC
- –2014: FC Tama
- 2015–2017: Toko Gakuen High School

College career
Years	Team	Apps	(Gls)
2018–2021	Waseda University		

Senior career*
Years	Team	Apps	(Gls)
2022–2025	Fagiano Okayama	99	(12)
2025	→ Ventforet Kofu (loan)	38	(2)
2026–	Sagan Tosu	15	(2)

International career
2017	Japan U18		
- * Club domestic league appearances and goals as of 14 August 2026

Yūdai Tanaka (田中 雄大, Tanaka Yūdai; born 14 December 1999) is a Japanese footballer currently playing as a midfielder for J2 League club Sagan Tosu.

== Early life ==
Tanaka played for the Japan U15s during his time at FC Tama, and aimed to go professional after leaving Toko Gakuen High School, but was unable to and joined Waseda University. At Toko Gakuen High School, he served as captain during his third year. At Waseda University, he served as captain during his fourth year.

== Career ==
On 8 November 2022, Tanaka was promoted to the first team from the 2022 season. He scored on his league debut against Ventforet Kofu on 20 February 2022, scoring in the 42nd minute. On 27 December 2024, Tanaka's contract with the club was extended for the 2025 season.

On 4 January 2025, Tanaka was announced at Ventforet Kofu on loan.

In December 2025, it was announced that Tanaka would be joining J2 League club Sagan Tosu.

== Career statistics ==
=== Club ===
As of 27 March 2026.

Appearances and goals by club, season and competition
Club	Season	League			National cup (Note: Includes Emperors Cup)		League cup (Note: Includes J.League Cup)		Other		Total	
Club	Season	Division	Apps	Goals	Apps	Goals	Apps	Goals	Apps	Goals	Apps	Goals
Fagiano Okayama	2022	J2 League	39	5	0	0	0	0	1 (Note: Appearance in J1/J2 play-offs)	0	40	5
Fagiano Okayama	2023	J2 League	33	4	0	0	0	0	0	0	33	4
Fagiano Okayama	2024	J2 League	27	3	1	1	2	2	0	0	30	6
Fagiano Okayama	Total		99	12	1	1	2	2	1	0	103	15
Ventforet Kofu (loan)	2025	J2 League	38	2	2	0	2	1	–		42	3
Sagan Tosu	2026	J2/J3 (100)	7	1	–		–		–		7	1
Career total			144	15	3	1	4	3	1	0	152	19
