= Ryosuke Kawano =

Japanese footballer (born 1994)

Ryosuke Kawano 河野 諒祐
Personal information
- Full name: Ryosuke Kawano
- Date of birth: 24 December 1994 (age 31)
- Place of birth: Hadano, Kanagawa, Japan
- Height: 1.76 m (5 ft 9 1/2 in)
- Position: Right back

Team information
- Current team: SC Sagamihara
- Number: 7

Youth career
- 2005–2012: Shonan Bellmare

Senior career*
| Years | Team | Apps | (Gls) |
| 2013–2014 | Shonan Bellmare | 1 | (0) |
| 2014 | → Fukushima United (loan) | 4 | (0) |
| 2015–2017 | Verspah Oita | 71 | (4) |
| 2018–2019 | YSCC Yokohama | 62 | (2) |
| 2020 | Mito HollyHock | 18 | (0) |
| 2021–2024 | Fagiano Okayama | 118 | (1) |
| 2024 | → Kagoshima United (loan) | 7 | (0) |
| 2025– | SC Sagamihara | 29 | (0) |
- * Club domestic league appearances and goals as of 16 January 2026

Ryosuke Kawano (河野 諒祐, Kawano Ryōsuke; born December 24, 1994) is a Japanese football player who play as a Right back and currently play for J3 League club, SC Sagamihara.

== Playing career ==
=== Shonan Bellmare ===
On 28 April 2011, Kawano was registered as a Class 2 player. He was registered as a Class 2 player again on 14 September 2012. On 17 October 2012, Kawano was promoted to the first team for the 2013 season. He made his league debut against Júbilo Iwata on 27 April 2013. On 26 November 2014, it was announced that Shonan Bellmare would not be renewing his contract.

=== Loan to Fukushima United ===
On 21 December 2013, Kawano was announced at Fukushima United.

=== YSCC Yokohama ===
In January 2018, after three seasons with Verspah Oita, Kawano signed for YSCC Yokohama. He made his league debut against SC Sagamihara on 9 March 2018. Kawano scored his first league goal against Matsumoto Yamaga on 28 April 2019, scoring in the 1st minute.

=== Mito Hollyhock ===
Kawano made his league debut against Matsumoto Yamaga on 15 July 2020. On 10 December 2020, it was announced that Mito Hollyhock would not be renewing his contract.

=== Fagiano Okayama ===
On 4 January 2021, Kawano was announced at Fagiano Okayama. He made his league debut against Tochigi on 28 February 2021. Kawano scored his first league goal against Omiya Ardija on 21 August 2021, scoring in the 32nd minute.

=== Loan to Kagoshima United ===
On 23 July 2024, Kawano was announced at Kagoshima United. He made his league debut against Blaublitz Akita on 11 August 2024.

=== SC Sagamihara ===
On 5 January 2025, Kawano was announce official transfer to J3 club, SC Sagamihara for 2025 season.

== Career statistics ==
=== Club ===
As of the start for 2025 season.

| Season | Club | League | Apps | Goals | Apps | Goals | Apps | Goals | Apps | Goals |
| Japan | | | League | | Emperor's Cup | | J.League Cup | | Total | |
|---|---|---|---|---|---|---|---|---|---|---|
| 2013 | Shonan Bellmare | J.League Div 1 | 1 | 0 | 0 | 0 | 0 | 0 | 1 | 0 |
| 2014 | Fukushima United | J3 League | 4 | 0 | – | | – | | 4 | 0 |
| 2015 | Verspah Oita | JFL | 14 | 1 | 1 | 0 | – | | 15 | 1 |
| 2016 | Verspah Oita | JFL | 29 | 1 | – | | – | | 29 | 1 |
| 2017 | Verspah Oita | JFL | 28 | 2 | 2 | 0 | – | | 30 | 2 |
| 2018 | YSCC Yokohama | J3 League | 28 | 0 | 2 | 0 | – | | 30 | 0 |
| 2019 | YSCC Yokohama | J3 League | 34 | 2 | 0 | 0 | – | | 34 | 2 |
| 2020 | Mito HollyHock | J2 League | 18 | 0 | – | | – | | 18 | 0 |
| 2021 | Fagiano Okayama | J2 League | 42 | 1 | 2 | 0 | – | | 44 | 1 |
| 2022 | Fagiano Okayama | J2 League | 36 | 0 | 0 | 0 | – | | 36 | 0 |
| 2023 | Fagiano Okayama | J2 League | 31 | 0 | 0 | 0 | – | | 31 | 0 |
| 2024 | Fagiano Okayama | J2 League | 8 | 0 | 1 | 0 | 2 | 1 | 11 | 1 |
| 2024 | Kagoshima United (loan) | J2 League | 7 | 0 | – | | | | 7 | 0 |
| 2025 | SC Sagamihara | J3 League | 0 | 0 | 0 | 0 | 0 | 0 | 0 | 0 |
| Career total | | | 280 | 7 | 8 | 0 | 2 | 1 | 290 | 8 |
