= Solomon Sakuragawa =

Japanese footballer

Solomon Sakuragawa 櫻川 ソロモン
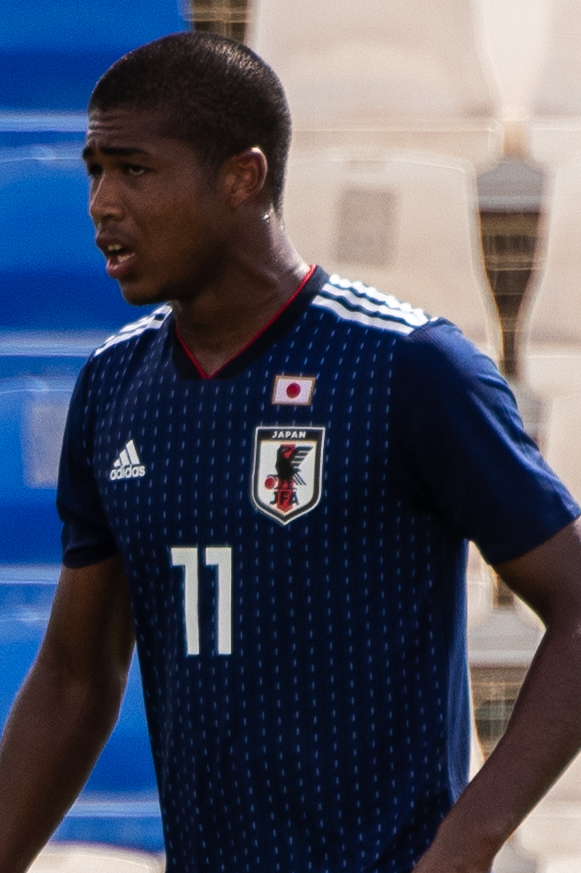
- Sakuragawa playing for Japan U19 in 2019

Personal information
- Date of birth: 4 August 2001 (age 25)
- Place of birth: Chiba, Chiba, Japan
- Height: 1.90 m (6 ft 3 in)
- Position: Forward

Team information
- Current team: Cerezo Osaka
- Number: 9

Youth career
- JSC Chiba
- –2020: JEF United Chiba

Senior career*
Years	Team	Apps	(Gls)
2020–2022	JEF United Chiba	79	(13)
2023	→ Fagiano Okayama (loan)	29	(4)
2024–2025	Yokohama FC	72	(9)
2026–	Cerezo Osaka	21	(9)

International career^{‡}
2018–2019	Japan U18	5	(1)
2019	Japan U20	2	(0)
- * Club domestic league appearances and goals as of 10 August 2026 ‡ National team caps and goals as of 17:04, 17 July 2020 (UTC)

Solomon Sakuragawa (櫻川 ソロモン, Sakuragawa Solomon; born 4 August 2001) is a Japanese footballer currently playing as a forward for J1 League club Cerezo Osaka.

== Early life ==
Sakuragawa was born in Chiba. He is of Nigerian descent.

== Career ==
On 16 December 2019, Sakuragawa was promoted to the first team from the 2020 season. On 10 January 2020, it was announced he would train with RC Celta de Vigo's U19 team for two months. Sakuragawa scored on his league debut for JEF United on 15 July 2020 against Zweigen Kanazawa, scoring in the 23rd minute.

On 14 December 2022, Sakuragawa was announced at Fagiano Okayama on loan. He scored on his league debut for Fagiano on 18 February 2023 against Júbilo Iwata, scoring in the 26th minute.

On 3 January 2024, Sakuragawa signed for Yokohama FC.

On 5 January 2026, Sakuragawa signed for Cerezo Osaka.

== Career statistics ==
As of 23 March 2026.

Appearances and goals by club, season and competition
Club	Season	League			National cup (Note: Includes Emperors Cup)		League cup (Note: Includes J.League Cup)		Total	
Club	Season	Division	Apps	Goals	Apps	Goals	Apps	Goals	Apps	Goals
JEF United Chiba	2020	J2 League	13	2	0	0	–		13	2
JEF United Chiba	2021	J2 League	30	4	1	0	–		31	4
JEF United Chiba	2022	J2 League	36	7	1	1	–		37	8
JEF United Chiba	Total		79	13	2	1	0	0	81	14
Fagiano Okayama (loan)	2023	J2 League	29	4	2	2	–		31	6
Yokohama FC	2024	J2 League	37	5	2	0	2	1	41	6
Yokohama FC	2025	J1 League	35	4	2	1	8	1	45	6
Yokohama FC	Total		72	9	4	1	10	2	86	12
Cerezo Osaka	2026	J1 (100)	8	3	–		–		8	3
Career total			188	29	8	4	10	2	206	35
