= 2020 Hokkaido Consadole Sapporo season =

Hokkaido Consadole Sapporo
2020 season
- Chairman: Yoshikazu Nonomura
- Manager: Mihailo Petrović
- Stadium: Sapporo Dome; Sapporo Atsubetsu Stadium
- Top goalscorer: League:
Home colours	Away colours

The 2020 season was Hokkaido Consadole Sapporo's 9th season in the J1 League.

== Squad ==
As of 8 February 2020

No.	Name	Nationality	Position	Date of birth (age)	Signed from
Goalkeepers
1	Takanori Sugeno	(Japan)	GK	3 May 1984 (age 42)	Kyoto Sanga
21	Shunta Awaka	(Japan)	GK	7 February 1995 (age 31)	Consadole Sapporo Youth
25	Gu Sung-yun	(South Korea)	GK	27 June 1994 (age 32)	Cerezo Osaka
	Kawin Thamsatchanan	(Thailand)	GK	26 January 1990 (age 36)	Loan from OH Leuven
Defenders
2	Naoki Ishikawa	(Japan)	DF	13 September 1985 (age 41)	Vegalta Sendai
3	Ryosuke Shindo	(Japan)	DF	7 June 1996 (age 30)	Consadole Sapporo Youth
5	Akito Fukumori	(Japan)	DF	16 December 1992 (age 33)	Kawasaki Frontale
15	Taiyo Hama	(Japan)	DF	14 June 1998 (age 28)	Consadole Sapporo Youth
20	Kim Min-tae	(South Korea)	DF	26 November 1993 (age 32)	Vegalta Sendai
32	Shunta Tanaka	(Japan)	DF	26 May 1997 (age 29)	Osaka University of Health and Sport Sciences
Midfielders
7	Lucas Fernandes	(Brazil)	MF	24 April 1994 (age 32)	Loan from Fluminense FC
8	Kazuki Fukai	(Japan)	MF	11 March 1995 (age 31)	Consadole Sapporo Youth
10	Hiroki Miyazawa (captain)	(Japan)	MF	28 June 1989 (age 37)	Muroran Ohtani
14	Yoshiaki Komai	(Japan)	MF	6 June 1992 (age 34)	Urawa Red Diamonds
17	Riku Danzaki	(Japan)	MF	31 May 2000 (age 26)	Aomori Yamada
18	Chanathip Songkrasin	(Thailand)	MF	5 October 1993 (age 33)	Muangthong United
19	Kosuke Shirai	(Japan)	MF	1 May 1994 (age 32)	Ehime FC
23	Yoshihiro Nakano	(Japan)	MF	24 February 1993 (age 33)	Vegalta Sendai
26	Ryota Hayasaka	(Japan)	MF	19 September 1985 (age 41)	Sagan Tosu
27	Takuma Arano	(Japan)	MF	20 April 1993 (age 33)	Consadole Sapporo Youth
30	Takuro Kaneko	(Japan)	MF	30 July 1997 (age 29)	Nihon University
31	Tomoki Takamine	(Japan)	MF	29 December 1997 (age 28)	University of Tsukuba
Forwards
4	Daiki Suga	(Japan)	FW	10 September 1998 (age 28)	Consadole Sapporo Youth
9	Musashi Suzuki	(Japan)	FW	11 April 1994 (age 32)	V-Varen Nagasaki
11	Anderson Lopes	(Brazil)	FW	15 September 1993 (age 33)	Tombense
16	Ren Fujimura	(Japan)	FW	26 May 1999 (age 27)	Consadole Sapporo Youth
33	Douglas Oliveira	(Brazil)	FW	16 January 1995 (age 31)	Loan from Luverdense
48	Jay Bothroyd	(England)	FW	7 May 1982 (age 44)	Júbilo Iwata

=== On loan ===
Note: Flags indicate national team as defined under FIFA eligibility rules; some limited exceptions apply. Players may hold more than one non-FIFA nationality.

No.	Pos.	Nation	Player
13	FW	JPN	Yuto Iwasaki (on loan at Shonan Bellmare)

== Competitions ==
The 2020 Meiji Yasuda J1 League season began on 21 February 2020.

=== League table ===
Pos	Team	Pld	W	D	L	GF	GA	GD	Pts
10	Urawa Red Diamonds	34	13	7	14	43	56	−13	46
11	Oita Trinita	34	11	10	13	36	45	−9	43
12	Hokkaido Consadole Sapporo	34	10	9	15	47	58	−11	39
13	Sagan Tosu	34	7	15	12	37	43	−6	36
14	Vissel Kobe	34	9	9	16	50	59	−9	36

Source: J.League Data Site
Rules for classification: 1) Points; 2) Goal difference; 3) Head-to-head points; 4) Head-to-head goal difference; 5) Head-to-head goal scored; 6) Number of wins; 7) Goals scored; 8) Fair-play points.

=== Results summary ===
Overall								Home						Away					
Pld	W	D	L	GF	GA	GD	Pts	W	D	L	GF	GA	GD	W	D	L	GF	GA	GD
25	7	6	12	32	47	−15	27	4	4	6	20	24	−4	3	2	6	12	23	−11

Last updated: 24 October 2020.
Source: see below

=== Results by round ===
Round	1	2	3	4	5	6	7	8	9	10	11	12	13	14	15	16	17	18	19	20	21	22	23	24	25	26
Ground	A	A	A	A	A	H	H	H	A	H	H	A	H	H	A	H	A	H	H	A	H	H	A	H	H	A
Result/W	L	W	W	D	D	D	W	L	L	L	D	L	D	L	L	L	W	L	L	L	D	W	L	W	W	

Updated to match(es) played on 24 October 2020. Source: See Below
A = Away; H = Home; W = Win; D = Draw; L = Loss

=== Results ===
22 February 2020 1	Kashiwa Reysol	4 – 2	Consadole Sapporo	Kashiwa
15:00 JST (UTC+9)	Esaka 13', 58'; Takahashi (yellow card) 16'; Olunga 20', 65'	Report	Arano 68'; Suzuki 76'	Stadium: Sankyo Frontier Kashiwa Stadium; Attendance: 12,468; Referee: Masaaki Iemoto

4 July 2020 2	Yokohama FC	1 – 2	Consadole Sapporo	Yokohama
18:00 JST (UTC+9)	Kazunari Ichimi 16'; Eijiro Takeda (yellow card) 73'	Report	Musashi Suzuki 3', 53'	Stadium: Nippatsu Mitsuzawa Stadium; Attendance: 0 Referee: Masaaki Iemoto

8 July 2020 3	Kashima Antlers	0 – 2	Consadole Sapporo	Kashima
19:00 JST (UTC+9)	Yasushi Endo (yellow card) 80'	Report	Musashi Suzuki 7'; Lucas Fernandes 90+3'; Takuma Arano (yellow card) 37'; Daiki Suga (yellow card) 49'; Kazuki Fukai (yellow card) 53'; Takanori Sugeno (yellow card) 89'; Takuro Kaneko (yellow card) 90+1'	Stadium: Kashima Soccer Stadium; Attendance: 0 Referee: Yusuke Araki

12 July 2020 4	Shonan Bellmare	0 – 0	Consadole Sapporo	Hiratsuka
19:00 JST	Kazunari Ohno (yellow card) 43'	Report		Stadium: Shonan BMW Stadium Hiratsuka; Attendance: 0 Referee: Yuichi Nishimura

18 July 2020 5	Vegalta Sendai	2 – 2	Consadole Sapporo	Sendai
18:00 JST	Ryo Germain 23'; Keiya Shiihashi 60'	Report	Chanathip Songkrasin 62' (yellow card) 78'; Shunta Tanaka 90+1'; Takuma Arano (red card) 32'; Daiki Suga (yellow card) 43'; Daiki Suga (yellow card) 49'; Ryosuke Shindo (yellow card) 88'; Hiroki Miyazawa (yellow card) 90+6'	Stadium: Yurtec Stadium Sendai; Attendance: 0 Referee: Jumpei Iida

22 July 2020 6	Consadole Sapporo	1 – 1	FC Tokyo	Sapporo
19:05 JST	Daiki Suga 45+2'; Tomoki Takamine (yellow card) 76'; Akito Fukumori (yellow card) 60'	Report	Sei Muroya 88'; Joan Oumari (yellow card) 49'; Leandro (yellow card) 56'	Stadium: Sapporo Dome; Attendance: 0 Referee: Hiroyuki Kimura

26 July 2020 7	Consadole Sapporo	3 – 1	Yokohama F Marinos	Sapporo
14:05 JST	Yoshiaki Komai 16'; Takuma Arano 18'; Takuro Kaneko 89'; Tomoki Takamine (yellow card) 69'	Report	Jun Amano 15'; Theerathon Bunmathan (yellow card) 42'; Takahiro Ohgihara (yellow card) 59'; Makito Ito (yellow card)	Stadium: Sapporo Dome; Attendance: 0 Referee: Yusuke Araki

2 August 2020 8	Consadole Sapporo	2 – 3	Vissel Kobe	Sapporo
14:00 JST	Takuma Arano 29', 48'	Report	Hotaru Yamaguchi 31', 62'; Douglas 45'; Hiroki Iikura (yellow card) 58'	Stadium: Sapporo Dome; Attendance: 0 Referee: Yuichi Nishimura

8 August 2020 9	Shimizu S-Pulse	3 – 1	Consadole Sapporo	Shizuoka
18:00 JST	Shota Kaneko 45+4' (pen.); Renato Augusto 85'; Carlinhos 90+3'; Togo Umeda (yellow card) 90+1'	Report	Musashi Suzuki 52'; Daiki Suga (yellow card) 45+3'; Shunta Tanaka (yellow card) 54' (yellow-red card) 63'; Kim Min-Tae (yellow card) 71'; Douglas Oliveira (yellow card) 81'; Takuma Arano (yellow card) 90+3'	Stadium: IAI Stadium Nihondaira; Attendance: 0 Referee: Minoru Tojo

15 August 2020 10	Consadole Sapporo	1 – 6	Kawasaki Frontale	Sapporo
14:00 JST	Jay Bothroyd 78'; Takuma Arano (yellow card) 60'; Kazuki Fukai (yellow card) 29'	Report	Shintaro Kurumaya 35'; Kaoru Mitoma 50', 63'; Leandro Damião 55' (yellow card) 45'; Yu Kobayashi 87', 90+5'	Stadium: Sapporo Dome; Attendance: 0 Referee: Hiroyuki Kimura

19 August 2020 11	Consadole Sapporo	1 – 1	Oita Trinita	Sapporo
19:30 JST	Lucas Fernandes 89'	Report	Kohei Isa 45+2'	Stadium: Sapporo Atsubetsu Park Stadium; Attendance: 0 Referee: Yudai Yamamoto

26 August 2020 12	Yokohama F Marinos	4 – 1	Consadole Sapporo	Yokohama
19:30 JST	Marcos Júnior 8', 40'; Shinnosuke Hatanaka 52'; Teruhita Nagakawa 85'; Daizen Maeda (yellow card) 17'; Eitaro Matsuda (yellow card) 65'	Report	Anderson Lopes 90+3'; Takuro Kaneko (yellow card) 88'	Stadium: Nissan Stadium; Attendance: 0 Referee: Jumpei Iida

29 August 2020 13	Consadole Sapporo	0 – 0	Nagoya Grampus	Sapporo
19:00 JST	Kim Min-Tae (yellow card) 65'; Hiroki Miyazawa (yellow card) 77'	Report		Stadium: Sapporo Dome; Attendance: 0 Referee: Yuichi Nishimura

5 September 2020 14	Consadole Sapporo	0 – 2	Sanfrecce Hiroshima	Sapporo
14.00 JST	Takuro Kaneko (yellow card) 78'; Daiki Suga (yellow card) 90+3'	Report	Douglas Vieira 50'; Yuya Asano 90'; Rhayner (yellow card) 37'; Leandro Pereira (yellow card) 42'; Sho Sasaki (yellow card) 86'	Stadium: Sapporo Atsubetsu Park Stadium; Attendance: 0 Referee: Ryuji Sato

9 September 2020 15	Cerezo Osaka	2 – 0	Consadole Sapporo	Osaka
19:30 JST	Okuno 6' 59'	Report	Douglas Oliveira (yellow card) 28'; Sugeno (yellow card) 45+2'; Bothroyd (yellow card) 62'; Lucas Fernandes (yellow card) 87'	Stadium: Yanmar Stadium Nagai; Attendance: 3,140; Referee: (Japan) Masuya Ueda

13 September 2020 16	Consadole Sapporo	3 – 4	Urawa Reds	Sapporo
13:05 JST	Bothroyd 31' 35'; Sugimoto 67' (o.g.)	Report	Sugimoto 13' (pen.) 20'; Makino 75'; Shibato 90+4'	Stadium: Sapporo Dome; Attendance: 4,449; Referee: (Japan) Yusuke Araki

16 September 2020 17	Sagan Tosu	0 – 2	Consadole Sapporo	Tosu
19:30 JST	Miya (yellow card) 5'	Report	Suga (yellow card) 34'; Komai 61'; Anderson Lopes 66'; Kaneko (yellow card) 87'	Stadium: Ekimae Real Estate Stadium; Attendance: 2,592; Referee: (Japan) Koichiro Fukushima

19 September 2020 18	Consadole Sapporo	0 – 1	Gamba Osaka	Sapporo
14:00 JST		Report	Watanabe 78'	Stadium: Sapporo Dome; Attendance: 2,749; Referee: (Japan) Hiroyuki Kimura

23 September 2020 19	Consadole Sapporo	0 – 1	Kashiwa Reysol	Sapporo
18:30 JST	Shindo (yellow card) 90+2'	Report	Koga (yellow card) 38'; Otani 52'; Kim Seung-gyu (yellow card) 90+4'; Goya (yellow card) 90+5'	Stadium: Sapporo Dome; Attendance: 3,002; Referee: (Japan) Minoru Tōjō

26 September 2020 20	Vissel Kobe	4 – 0	Consadole Sapporo	Kobe
19:00 JST	Furuhashi 19' 62'; Goke 45'; Oda 90'; Ogawa (yellow card) 90+3'	Report	Miyazawa (yellow card) 78'	Stadium: Noevir Stadium Kobe; Attendance: 5,335; Referee: (Japan) Hajime Matsuo

3 October 2020 21	Consadole Sapporo	3 – 3	Vegalta Sendai	Sapporo
14:00 JST	Anderson Lopes 25'; Fukumori (yellow card) 42'; Shiihashi 59' (o.g.); Suga 61'	Report	Alexandre Guedes 47' 50'; Hiraoka 56'; Isaac Cuenca (yellow card) 90+7'	Stadium: Sapporo Dome; Attendance: 5,339; Referee: (Japan) Nobutsugu Murakami

10 October 2020 22	Consadole Sapporo	2 – 1	Shonan Bellmare	Sapporo
14:00 JST	Kaneko 42' 55'; Komai (yellow card) 87'	Report	Kaneko 36'	Stadium: Sapporo Dome; Attendance: 2,859; Referee: (Japan) Takuto Okabe

2020 23	–

2020 24	–

2020 25	–

2020 26	–

2020 27	–

2020 28	–

2020 29	–

2020 30	–

2020 31	–

2020 32	–

2020 33	–

2020 34	–

=== J. League Cup ===
==== Group C ====
16 February 2020 1	Sagan Tosu	0 – 3	Consadole Sapporo	Tosu
14:03 JST (UTC+9)		Report	Bothroyd 14'; Arano (yellow card) 58'; Fukumori 81'; Suzuki 90+2'	Stadium: Ekimae Real Estate Stadium; Attendance: 8,063

26 February 2020 2	Sanfrecce Hiroshima	–	Consadole Sapporo
JST (UTC+9)
Note: Match postponed due to Coronavirus.

4 March 2020 3	Yokohama FC	–	Consadole Sapporo
JST (UTC+9)
Note: Match postponed due to Coronavirus.

== Squad statistics ==
As of Match played 22 February 2020

=== Appearances and goals ===
No.	Pos	Nat	Player	Total		J1 League		Emperor's Cup		J. League Cup	
No.	Pos	Nat	Player	Apps	Goals	Apps	Goals	Apps	Goals	Apps	Goals
3	DF	(Japan) JPN	Ryosuke Shindo	2	0	1	0	0	0	1	0
4	FW	(Japan) JPN	Daiki Suga	2	0	1	0	0	0	1	0
5	DF	(Japan) JPN	Akito Fukumori	2	1	1	0	0	0	1	1
7	MF	(Brazil) BRA	Lucas Fernandes	1	0	0+1	0	0	0	0	0
9	FW	(Japan) JPN	Musashi Suzuki	2	2	1	1	0	0	1	1
10	MF	(Japan) JPN	Hiroki Miyazawa	2	0	1	0	0	0	1	0
11	FW	(Brazil) BRA	Anderson Lopes	1	0	0+1	0	0	0	0	0
14	MF	(Japan) JPN	Yoshiaki Komai	2	0	0+1	0	0	0	0+1	0
17	MF	(Japan) JPN	Riku Danzaki	1	0	0	0	0	0	1	0
18	MF	(Thailand) THA	Chanathip Songkrasin	2	0	1	0	0	0	1	0
19	MF	(Japan) JPN	Kosuke Shirai	2	0	1	0	0	0	0+1	0
20	DF	(South Korea) KOR	Kim Min-tae	1	0	1	0	0	0	0	0
25	GK	(South Korea) KOR	Gu Sung-yun	2	0	1	0	0	0	1	0
27	MF	(Japan) JPN	Takuma Arano	2	1	1	1	0	0	1	0
30	MF	(Japan) JPN	Takuro Kaneko	1	0	0	0	0	0	0+1	0
31	MF	(Japan) JPN	Tomoki Takamine	1	0	0	0	0	0	1	0
48	FW	(England) ENG	Jay Bothroyd	2	1	1	0	0	0	1	1

=== Goal scorers ===
Place	Position	Nation	Number	Name	J1 League	Emperor's Cup	J. League Cup	Total
1	FW	(Japan)	9	Musashi Suzuki	1	0	1	2
2	FW	(England)	48	Jay Bothroyd	0	0	1	1
2	DF	(Japan)	5	Akito Fukumori	0	0	1	1
2	MF	(Japan)	27	Takuma Arano	1	0	0	1
TOTALS					2	0	3	5

=== Disciplinary record ===
Number	Nation	Position	Name	J1 League		Emperor's Cup		J. League Cup		Total	
Number	Nation	Position	Name	Yellow card	Red card	Yellow card	Red card	Yellow card	Red card	Yellow card	Red card
27	(Japan)	MF	Takuma Arano	0	0	0	0	1	0	1	0
TOTALS				0	0	0	0	1	0	1	0
