= 2018 Hokkaido Consadole Sapporo season =

Hokkaido Consadole Sapporo
2018 season
- Manager: Mihailo Petrović
- Stadium: Sapporo Dome
- J1 League: 4th
Home colours	Away colours

2018 Hokkaido Consadole Sapporo season.

== Squad ==
As of 14 January 2018.

Note: Flags indicate national team as defined under FIFA eligibility rules; some limited exceptions apply. Players may hold more than one non-FIFA nationality.

No.	Pos.	Nation	Player
1	GK	(Japan) JPN	Takanori Sugeno (on loan from Kyoto Sanga)
2	DF	(Japan) JPN	Tomonobu Yokoyama
3	DF	(Japan) JPN	Yudai Tanaka
4	DF	(Japan) JPN	Ryuji Kawai (vice-captain)
5	DF	(Japan) JPN	Akito Fukumori
6	MF	(Japan) JPN	Shingo Hyodo
7	MF	(Brazil) BRA	Julinho
8	MF	(Japan) JPN	Kazuki Fukai
9	FW	(Japan) JPN	Ken Tokura
10	MF	(Japan) JPN	Hiroki Miyazawa (captain)
11	FW	(Brazil) BRA	Reis
13	FW	(Japan) JPN	Yoshihiro Uchimura
14	MF	(Japan) JPN	Yoshiaki Komai (on loan from Urawa Red Diamonds)
15	DF	(Japan) JPN	Naoya Kikuchi
17	MF	(Japan) JPN	Junichi Inamoto
18	MF	(Thailand) THA	Chanathip Songkrasin (on loan from Muangthong United)

No.	Pos.	Nation	Player
19	MF	(Japan) JPN	Kosuke Shirai
20	DF	(South Korea) KOR	Kim Min-Tae
21	GK	(Japan) JPN	Shunta Awaka
25	GK	(South Korea) KOR	Gu Sung-yun
26	DF	(Japan) JPN	Ryota Hayasaka
27	MF	(Japan) JPN	Takuma Arano (vice-captain)
31	FW	(Japan) JPN	Takumi Miyayoshi
32	DF	(Japan) JPN	Naoki Ishikawa
35	DF	(Japan) JPN	Ryosuke Shindo
37	DF	(Japan) JPN	Taiyo Hama
38	DF	(Japan) JPN	Daiki Suga
40	FW	(Japan) JPN	Ren Fujimura
41	MF	(Japan) JPN	Koji Miyoshi (on loan from Kawasaki Frontale)
44	MF	(Japan) JPN	Shinji Ono
48	FW	(England) ENG	Jay Bothroyd

=== Out on loan ===
Note: Flags indicate national team as defined under FIFA eligibility rules; some limited exceptions apply. Players may hold more than one non-FIFA nationality.

No.	Pos.	Nation	Player
—	DF	(Japan) JPN	Yuto Nagasaka (at Mito HollyHock)
—	MF	(Japan) JPN	Hiroyuki Mae (at Mito HollyHock)

No.	Pos.	Nation	Player
—	MF	(Japan) JPN	Shogo Nakahara (at V-Varen Nagasaki)
—	FW	(Japan) JPN	Hidetaka Kanazono (at Ventforet Kofu)

== J1 League ==
=== League table ===
Pos	Team	Pld	W	D	L	GF	GA	GD	Pts	Qualification or relegation
2	Sanfrecce Hiroshima	34	17	6	11	47	35	+12	57	Qualification for the Champions League play-off round
3	Kashima Antlers	34	16	8	10	50	39	+11	56	Qualification for the Champions League play-off round
4	Hokkaido Consadole Sapporo	34	15	10	9	48	48	0	55	
5	Urawa Red Diamonds	34	14	9	11	51	39	+12	51	Qualification for the Champions League group stage (Note: Urawa Red Diamonds qualified for the 2019 AFC Champions League group stage as 2018 Emperor's Cup winners.)
6	FC Tokyo	34	14	8	12	39	34	+5	50	

Source: Meiji Yasuda J1 League
Rules for classification: 1) Points; 2) Goal difference; 3) Goals scored

=== Match details ===
Match	Date	Team	Score	Team	Venue	Attendance
1	2018.02.24	Sanfrecce Hiroshima	1–0	Hokkaido Consadole Sapporo	Edion Stadium Hiroshima	17,026
2	2018.03.02	Cerezo Osaka	3–3	Hokkaido Consadole Sapporo	Kincho Stadium	10,415
3	2018.03.10	Hokkaido Consadole Sapporo	1–3	Shimizu S-Pulse	Sapporo Dome	19,390
4	2018.03.18	Hokkaido Consadole Sapporo	2–1	V-Varen Nagasaki	Sapporo Dome	13,568
5	2018.03.31	Kashima Antlers	0–0	Hokkaido Consadole Sapporo	Kashima Soccer Stadium	19,629
6	2018.04.07	Hokkaido Consadole Sapporo	3–0	Nagoya Grampus	Sapporo Dome	17,390
7	2018.04.11	Hokkaido Consadole Sapporo	1–0	Shonan Bellmare	Sapporo Dome	11,183
8	2018.04.14	Kashiwa Reysol	1–2	Hokkaido Consadole Sapporo	Sankyo Frontier Kashiwa Stadium	9,533
9	2018.04.21	Urawa Reds	0–0	Hokkaido Consadole Sapporo	Saitama Stadium 2002	39,091
10	2018.04.25	Hokkaido Consadole Sapporo	2–1	Yokohama F. Marinos	Sapporo Atsubetsu Stadium	6,729
11	2018.04.28	Vegalta Sendai	2–2	Hokkaido Consadole Sapporo	Yurtec Stadium Sendai	13,812
12	2018.05.02	Sagan Tosu	1–2	Hokkaido Consadole Sapporo	Best Amenity Stadium	7,377
13	2018.05.05	Hokkaido Consadole Sapporo	2–0	Gamba Osaka	Sapporo Atsubetsu Stadium	12,382
14	2018.05.13	FC Tokyo	0–0	Hokkaido Consadole Sapporo	Ajinomoto Stadium	24,589
15	2018.05.20	Vissel Kobe	4–0	Hokkaido Consadole Sapporo	Noevir Stadium Kobe	18,725
16	2018.07.18	Hokkaido Consadole Sapporo	1–2	Kawasaki Frontale	Sapporo Atsubetsu Stadium	10,711
17	2018.07.22	Hokkaido Consadole Sapporo	0–0	Júbilo Iwata	Sapporo Atsubetsu Stadium	10,723
19	2018.08.01	V-Varen Nagasaki	2–3	Hokkaido Consadole Sapporo	Transcosmos Stadium Nagasaki	6,579
20	2018.08.05	Hokkaido Consadole Sapporo	1–2	Kashiwa Reysol	Sapporo Dome	26,805
21	2018.08.11	Hokkaido Consadole Sapporo	1–1	Cerezo Osaka	Sapporo Dome	21,614
22	2018.08.15	Gamba Osaka	1–1	Hokkaido Consadole Sapporo	Panasonic Stadium Suita	21,203
23	2018.08.19	Hokkaido Consadole Sapporo	3–2	FC Tokyo	Sapporo Dome	18,521
24	2018.08.25	Shimizu S-Pulse	1–2	Hokkaido Consadole Sapporo	IAI Stadium Nihondaira	13,649
25	2018.09.01	Hokkaido Consadole Sapporo	3–1	Vissel Kobe	Sapporo Dome	32,475
26	2018.09.15	Kawasaki Frontale	7–0	Hokkaido Consadole Sapporo	Kawasaki Todoroki Stadium	22,522
27	2018.09.23	Hokkaido Consadole Sapporo	0–2	Kashima Antlers	Sapporo Dome	21,074
28	2018.09.29	Hokkaido Consadole Sapporo	2–1	Sagan Tosu	Sapporo Dome	16,195
29	2018.10.05	Yokohama F. Marinos	2–1	Hokkaido Consadole Sapporo	Nissan Stadium	19,124
30	2018.10.20	Shonan Bellmare	2–2	Hokkaido Consadole Sapporo	Shonan BMW Stadium Hiratsuka	11,982
18	2018.10.28	Nagoya Grampus	1–2	Hokkaido Consadole Sapporo	Paloma Mizuho Stadium	17,400
31	2018.11.04	Hokkaido Consadole Sapporo	1–0	Vegalta Sendai	Sapporo Dome	24,065
32	2018.11.10	Hokkaido Consadole Sapporo	1–2	Urawa Reds	Sapporo Atsubetsu Stadium	12,723
33	2018.11.24	Júbilo Iwata	0–2	Hokkaido Consadole Sapporo	Yamaha Stadium	14,051
34	2018.12.01	Hokkaido Consadole Sapporo	2–2	Sanfrecce Hiroshima	Sapporo Dome	34,250

== Emperors' Cup ==
6 June 2018 Second round	Consadole Sapporo	2–1	MIO Biwako Shiga	Sapporo Atsubetsu Stadium, Sapporo
19:00		Report		Attendance: 2,668

11 July 2018 Third round	Avispa Fukuoka	0–4	Consadole Sapporo	Level5 Stadium, Fukuoka
19:00		Report		Attendance: 1,736

26 September 2018 Fourth round	Júbilo Iwata	4–2	Consadole Sapporo	Yamaha Stadium, Iwata
19:00	Kawamata 9'; Yamada 59'; Hayasaka 72' (o.g,); Araki 76'	Report	Hayasaka 11'; Hyodo 69'	Attendance: 2,855; Referee: Hiroyuki Kimura
