= Musashi Suzuki =

Japanese footballer (born 1994)

Musashi Suzuki 鈴木 武蔵
Personal information
- Full name: Musashi Suzuki
- Date of birth: 11 February 1994 (age 32)
- Place of birth: Montego Bay, Jamaica
- Height: 1.85 m (6 ft 1 in)
- Position: Forward

Team information
- Current team: Tochigi City FC
- Number: 9

Youth career
- 2006–2008: FC Ōta
- 2009–2011: Kiryu University Daiichi High School

Senior career*
Years	Team	Apps	(Gls)
2012–2017	Albirex Niigata	97	(7)
2014–2015	→ J.League U22 (loan)	3	(0)
2015	→ Mito HollyHock (loan)	6	(2)
2017	→ Matsumoto Yamaga (loan)	9	(0)
2018	V-Varen Nagasaki	29	(11)
2019–2020	Hokkaido Consadole Sapporo	37	(18)
2020–2022	Beerschot	51	(7)
2022–2024	Gamba Osaka	29	(2)
2024	→ Hokkaido Consadole Sapporo (loan)	32	(6)
2025	Yokohama FC	22	(2)
2026–	Tochigi City FC	15	(2)

International career^{‡}
2011	Japan U17	4	(0)
2014–2016	Japan U23	10	(7)
2019–2020	Japan	9	(1)
Medal record
Representing Japan
AFC U-23 Championship
Gold medal – first place	2016 Qatar
- * Club domestic league appearances and goals as of 16 August 2026 ‡ National team caps and goals as of 24 January 2021

Musashi Suzuki (鈴木 武蔵, Suzuki Musashi; born 11 February 1994) is a Japanese professional footballer who plays for Tochigi City FC. He is mainly deployed as a forward.

== Club career ==
Suzuki entered Kiryu Daiichi High School and played for the school football club. In the 2011 season, the team advanced to the All Japan High School Soccer Tournament.

After graduating high school in 2012, Suzuki signed a professional contract with Albirex Niigata. On 4 April 2012, Suzuki made his first team debut against Shimizu S-Pulse in the J. League Cup as a 46th-minute substitute. He scored his first goal for the club in a 4–3 League Cup victory over Omiya Ardija.

V-Varen Nagasaki signed Suzuki before the start of the 2018 J1 season.

On 30 June 2022, Suzuki was announced at Gamba Osaka.

On 25 December 2023, Suzuki was announced at Hokkaido Consadole Sapporo on loan.

On 6 January 2025, Suzuki was announced at newly promoted club Yokohama FC for the 2025 season.

== International career ==
Born in Jamaica to a Jamaican father and raised in Japan by his Japanese mother, Suzuki is eligible to represent both Jamaica and Japan. In June 2011, Suzuki was called up to the Japan under-17 national team for the 2011 FIFA U-17 World Cup. He played in four matches.

He participated in the 2016 AFC U23 Championship for Japan, eventually winning the tournament. In August 2016, he was also called up to the Japan under-23 side for the 2016 Summer Olympics. He played in two matches and scored a goal against Nigeria.

He made his senior debut on 22 March 2019, starting in a friendly against Colombia

== Personal life ==
Suzuki's mother, Mariko, is Japanese and his father, Robert Hamilton, is Jamaican. He was born in Jamaica but grew up in Ōta, Japan. Growing up black in Japan, Suzuki said he was a victim of racial abuse, which went to the point that he "tried to whiten his skin with baby powder", which his mother said, "I like the color you are, Musashi."

== Career statistics ==
=== Club ===
As of the start from 2025 season.

Appearances and goals by club, season and competition
Club	Season	League			National Cup		League Cup		Total	
Club	Season	Division	Apps	Goals	Apps	Goals	Apps	Goals	Apps	Goals
Albirex Niigata	2012	J.League Div 1	9	0	0	0	4	1	13	1
Albirex Niigata	2013	J.League Div 1	15	2	1	0	2	0	17	2
Albirex Niigata	2014	J.League Div 1	29	3	2	3	6	3	34	6
Albirex Niigata	2015	J1 League	13	1	0	0	2	0	15	1
Mito HollyHock (loan)	2015	J2 League	6	2	3	1	0	0	9	3
Albirex Niigata	2016	J1 League	14	0	3	0	1	1	18	1
Albirex Niigata	2017	J1 League	17	1	2	0	5	0	24	1
Matsumoto Yamaga (loan)	2017	J2 League	9	0	0	0	0	0	9	0
V-Varen Nagasaki	2018	J1 League	29	11	2	1	0	0	31	12
Hokkaido Consadole Sapporo	2019	J1 League	33	13	0	0	6	7	39	20
Hokkaido Consadole Sapporo	2020	J1 League	4	5	0	0	1	1	5	6
Beerschot	2020–21	Belgian First Division A	18	6	0	0	0	0	18	6
Beerschot	2021–22	Belgian First Division A	25	1	1	0	0	0	26	1
Gamba Osaka	2022	J1 League	9	1	–				9	1
Gamba Osaka	2023	J1 League	20	1	0	0	4	0	24	1
Hokkaido Consadole Sapporo (loan)	2024	J1 League	32	6	0	0	2	1	34	7
Yokohama FC	2025	J1 League	0	0	0	0	0	0	0	0
Career total			290	53	15	5	32	14	337	72

=== International ===
As of 24 January 2021

Appearances and goals by national team and year
National team	Year	Apps	Goals
Japan	2019	7	1
Japan	2020	2	0
Total		9	1

Scores and results list Japan's goal tally first, score column indicates score after each Suzuki goal.

List of international goals scored by Musashi Suzuki
No.	Date	Venue	Opponent	Score	Result	Competition
1	10 December 2019	Busan Gudeok Stadium, Busan, South Korea	China	1–0	2–1	2019 EAFF E-1 Football Championship

== Honours ==
=== International ===
Japan U23

- AFC U23 Championship: 2016
