= Grad Damen =

Grad Damen is the name of:

- Grad Damen (footballer, born 1956), Dutch footballer also known as 'Gerrie'
- Grad Damen (footballer, born 1997), Dutch footballer, his grandson
- Grad Damen (singer), Dutch singer, another grandson
