= 2023–24 TOP Oss season =

96th season in existence of TOP Oss

TOP Oss
2023–24 season
- Manager: Ruud Brood
- Stadium: Frans Heesen Stadion
- Eerste Divisie: 18th
- KNVB Cup: First round
- Top goalscorer: League: Arthur Allemeersch; Konstantinos Doumtsios (6 each); All: Arthur Allemeersch; Konstantinos Doumtsios (6 each)
- Highest home attendance: 2,856 vs Den Bosch, 8 March 2024, Eerste Divisie
- Lowest home attendance: 1,189 vs Eindhoven, 5 April 2024, Eerste Divisie
- Biggest win: 4–1 vs Jong PSV (H), 18 August 2023, Eerste Divisie; 3–0 vs Jong Utrecht (A), 26 February 2024, Eerste Divisie
- Biggest defeat: 1–8 vs Cambuur (H), 6 November 2023, Eerste Divisie
- All statistics correct as of December 2023.

The 2023–24 season was TOP Oss' 96th year in existence and 13th consecutive season in the Eerste Divisie; the second tier of Dutch football. In addition to the domestic league, TOP Oss participated in this season's editions of the KNVB Cup

== Players ==
=== First-team squad ===
As of 2 September 2023

Note: Flags indicate national team as defined under FIFA eligibility rules; some limited exceptions apply. Players may hold more than one non-FIFA nationality.

No.	Pos.	Nation	Player
1	GK	NED	Mike Havekotte
2	DF	SMA	Ilounga Pata
3	DF	SUR	Calvin Mac-Intosch
4	DF	BEL	Xander Lambrix
5	DF	NED	Giovanni Troupée
6	MF	NED	Joshua Eijgenraam (on loan from Excelsior)
7	FW	NED	Amine Rehmi
8	MF	NED	Thijs van Leeuwen
9	FW	GRE	Konstantinos Doumtsios
10	FW	NED	Giovanni Korte
11	FW	CUW	Quenten Martinus
14	MF	NED	Grad Damen
16	GK	NED	Lars van Meurs
17	DF	CUW	Roshon van Eijma

No.	Pos.	Nation	Player
19	MF	NED	Rick Dekker
20	FW	NED	Maxim van Peer (on loan from NEC)
21	DF	NED	Thomas Cox (on loan from NEC)
22	MF	ESA	Enrico Hernández
23	DF	NED	Guus Gertsen (on loan from NEC)
24	DF	GRE	Vasilios Pavlidis
26	MF	NED	Julian Kuijpers (on loan from NEC)
27	DF	ISR	Jonathan Mulder
29	FW	ALB	Fabian Shahaj
30	GK	NED	Maarten Schouten (on loan from NEC)
31	MF	NED	Sven Zitman
39	FW	BEL	Arthur Allemeersch
75	FW	CUW	Joshua Zimmerman
87	FW	NED	Delano Ladan

== Transfers ==
=== In ===
Pos.	Player	Transferred from	Fee	Date	Source

=== Out ===
Pos.	Player	Transferred to	Fee	Date	Source

== Pre-season and friendlies ==
Win Draw Loss Fixtures

Friendly	(Netherlands)	–	(Netherlands)

== Competitions ==
=== Overall record ===
Competition	First match	Last match	Starting round	Final position	Record							
Competition	First match	Last match	Starting round	Final position	Pld	W	D	L	GF	GA	GD	Win %
Eerste Divisie	August 2023	10 May 2024	Matchday 1		17	2	2	13	10	28	−18	11.76
KNVB Cup	2 November 2023		First round	First round	1	0	0	1	0	1	−1	0.00
Total					18	2	2	14	10	29	−19	11.11

Last updated: 1 December 2023
Source: Soccerway

=== Eerste Divisie ===
==== League table ====
Pos	Team	Pld	W	D	L	GF	GA	GD	Pts	Promotion or qualification
16	Jong PSV	38	11	7	20	63	81	−18	40	Reserve teams are not eligible to be promoted to the Eredivisie
17	Telstar	38	9	8	21	47	68	−21	35	
18	TOP Oss	38	10	4	24	32	66	−34	34	
19	Den Bosch	38	8	9	21	38	68	−30	33	
20	Jong FC Utrecht	38	5	11	22	32	74	−42	26	Reserve teams are not eligible to be promoted to the Eredivisie

Source: Flashscore, Keuken Kampioen Divisie (in Dutch)
Rules for classification: Season in progress: 1) Most points won; 2) Less points lost; 3) Goal difference; 4) Goals scored; 5) Alphabetical order; End of season: 1) Points; 2) Goal difference; 3) Goals scored; 4) Head-to-head points; 5) Head-to-head goal difference; 6) Head-to-head away goals scored; 7) Play-off if relevant for deciding champion, relegation or participating in a European league, otherwise by draw. 8) Penalty shoot-out (only after a play-off)

==== Results summary ====
Overall								Home						Away					
Pld	W	D	L	GF	GA	GD	Pts	W	D	L	GF	GA	GD	W	D	L	GF	GA	GD
19	3	2	14	12	31	−19	11	3	0	6	9	16	−7	0	2	8	3	15	−12

Last updated: 15 December 2023.

==== Results by round ====
Round	1	2	3	4	5	6	7	8	9	10	11	12	13	14	15	16	17	18	19	20
Ground	A	H	A	H	H	A	A	H	A	H	A	A	H	H	A	A	H	A	H	A
Result	L	W	L	L	L	D	L	L	L	W	L	L	L	L	D	L	L	L	W	
Position	17	8	14	17	17	18	18	18	19	18	18	19	20	20	20	20	20	20	20	

Updated to match(es) played on 15 December 2023. Source:
A = Away; H = Home; W = Win; D = Draw; L = Loss

==== Matches ====
The league fixtures were unveiled on 30 June 2023.

11 August 2023 1	Den Bosch	1–0	Top Oss	's-Hertogenbosch
20:00 CET	Kostorz 68'; Sebastiaan van Bakel (yellow card) 90+9'	Report	Pata (yellow card) 45+1'; Pavlidis (yellow card) 87'	Stadium: De Vliert; Attendance: 4,201; Referee: (Netherlands) Richard Martens

18 August 2023 2	Top Oss	4–1	Jong PSV	Oss
20:00 CET	van Eijma 8' (pen.); Doumtsios 9' 23'; Bram Rovers 66' (o.g.)	Report	van Duiven 58'; Renzo Tytens (yellow card) 66' (yellow-red card) 69'; Bram Rovers (yellow card) 75'; Livano Comenencia (yellow card) 78'	Stadium: Frans Heesen Stadion; Attendance: 1,582; Referee: (Netherlands) Luuk Timmer

25 August 2023 3	Roda JC	2–0	Top Oss	Kerkrade
20:00 CET	Ould-Chikh 39'; Matisse Didden (yellow card) 67'; Daneels 87'	Report	Lambrix (yellow card) 58'	Stadium: Parkstad Limburg Stadion; Attendance: 7,631; Referee: (Netherlands) Pol van Boekel

1 September 2023 4	Top Oss	0–2	Groningen	Oss
20:00 CET	van Eijma (yellow card) 45+6'; van Leeuwen (yellow card) 90+7'	Report	Rente (yellow card) 24'; van Veen 45+7' 66'	Stadium: Frans Heesen Stadion; Referee: (Netherlands) Stan Teuben

15 September 2023 6	Helmond Sport	1–1	Top Oss	Helmond
20:00 CET	Chacón 55'	Report	Korte (yellow card) 23'; van Leeuwen (yellow card) 61'; Guus Gertsen (yellow card) 66'; Pavlidis (yellow card) 86'; Ladan 90'	Stadium: GS Staalwerken Stadion; Attendance: 1,844; Referee: (Netherlands) Laurens Gerrets

18 September 2023 5	Top Oss	0–1	Dordrecht	Oss
20:00 CET	van Eijma (yellow card) 29'; Ladan (yellow card) 45'; Hernández (yellow card) 90+4'	Report	Sebaoui 39' (yellow card) 71'; Shiloh 't Zand (yellow card) 71'; Plogmann (yellow card) 72'; Shein (yellow card) 83'; Suray (yellow card) 90'; Tsoungui (yellow card) 90+4'	Stadium: GS Staalwerken Stadion; Referee: (Netherlands) Martin Pérez

29 September 2023 8	Top Oss	0–1	Emmen	Oss
20:00 CET	Hernández (yellow card) 45+1'; Doumtsios (yellow card) 76'	Report	El Messaoudi 67'; Dirksen (yellow card) 79'	Stadium: GS Staalwerken Stadion; Attendance: 1,588; Referee: (Netherlands) Michael Eijgelsheim

3 October 2023 7	Willem II	2–1	Top Oss	Tilburg
20:00 CET	Verreth (yellow card) 30'; Behounek 61'; Bokila 82'	Report	van Eijma 39' (yellow card) 78'; Amine Rehmi (yellow card) 44'	Stadium: Koning Willem II Stadion; Attendance: 12,679; Referee: (Netherlands) Alex Bos

6 October 2023 9	ADO Den Haag	2–1	Top Oss	The Hague
20:00 CET	Veerman 17' 80'; Hamdaoui (yellow card) 58'; Sürmeli (yellow card) 86'	Report	Allemeersch 61' (yellow card) 63' (yellow-red card) 66'; Damen (yellow card) 63'	Stadium: Bingoal Stadion; Attendance: 8,258; Referee: (Netherlands) Richard Martens

20 October 2023 11	Jong AZ	3–0	Top Oss	Wijdewormer
20:00 CET	Mexx Meerdink 7'; Daal 13'; Addai (yellow card) 29' (goal) 53'	Report		Stadium: Sportcomplex Kalverhoek; Attendance: 325; Referee: (Netherlands) Luuk Timmer

23 October 2023 10	Top Oss	2–0	Jong FC Utrecht	Oss
20:00 CET	Joshua Zimmerman 9'; Mulder (yellow card) 39'; Maxim van Peer 90+1'	Report	Rafik El Arguioui (yellow card) 44'; Adrian Blake (yellow card) 54'; Nazjir Held (yellow card) 69'	Stadium: GS Staalwerken Stadion; Attendance: 1,350; Referee: (Netherlands) Stan Teuben

27 October 2023 12	Telstar	1–0	Top Oss	Velsen-Zuid
20:00 CET	Danny Bakker (red card) 5'; Apau 90+1'	Report	Hernández (yellow card) 87'	Stadium: 711 Stadion; Attendance: 1,963; Referee: (Netherlands) Martijn Vos

6 November 2023 13	TOP Oss	1–8	SC Cambuur	Oss
20:00 CET	van Eijma 18' (pen.); Amine Rehmi (red card) 30'; Hernández (yellow card) 69'	Report	Uldriķis 3'; Smit 33'; Gaschili 41'; van Kaam 46'; Wiebe Kooistra 59'; de Jong 64'; Smand 75'; Jeremy van Mullem 89'	Stadium: GS Staalwerken Stadion; Attendance: 1,342; Referee: (Netherlands) Martin Pérez

10 November 2023 14	TOP Oss	0–1	MVV Maastricht	Oss
20:00 CET	van Leeuwen (yellow card) 35'; Doumtsios (yellow card) 70'; Lambrix (yellow card) 83'; Joshua Zimmerman (yellow card) 90'	Report	Taşçı 63' (yellow card) 78'	Stadium: GS Staalwerken Stadion; Attendance: 2,090; Referee: (Netherlands) Thomas Hardeman

24 November 2023 16	Jong Ajax	1–0	TOP Oss	Amsterdam
20:00 CET	Godts 24'; Sarfo (yellow card) 90+4'	Report		Stadium: Sportpark De Toekomst; Attendance: 460; Referee: (Netherlands) Robin Vereijken

27 November 2023 15	FC Eindhoven	0–0	TOP Oss	Eindhoven
20:00 CET	Amevor (yellow card) 71'	Report	Mulder (yellow card) 15'; Thomas Cox (yellow card) 56'; Hernández (yellow card) 57'; Allemeersch (yellow card) 90+5'	Stadium: Jan Louwers Stadion; Attendance: 1,920; Referee: (Netherlands) Ingmar Oostrom

1 December 2023 17	TOP Oss	0–1	De Graafschap	Oss
20:00 CET		Report	Haen 6'	Stadium: GS Staalwerken Stadion; Attendance: 2,140; Referee: (Netherlands) Jesse Rozendal

8 December 2023 18	NAC Breda	2–0	TOP Oss	Breda
20:00 CET	Haugen 56'; Van den Bergh (yellow card) 69'; Aimé Omgba 85'	Report	van Leeuwen (yellow card) 62'	Stadium: Rat Verlegh Stadion; Attendance: 17,269; Referee: (Netherlands) Robin Hensgens

15 December 2023 19	Top Oss	2–1	VVV	Oss
20:00 CET	Allemeersch 11'; Hernández 36'; Pata (yellow card) 41'	Report	Sierra 39'	Stadium: GS Staalwerken Stadion; Attendance: 1,833; Referee: (Netherlands) Luuk Timmer

22 December 2023 20	MVV	–	Top Oss	Maastricht
20:00 CET				Stadium: Stadion De Geusselt

=== KNVB Cup ===
2 November 2023 First round	TOP Oss	0–1	Eindhoven	Oss
20:00 CET (UTC+1)				Stadium: Frans Heesen Stadion
