= Quenten Martinus =

Curaçaoan footballer (born 1991)

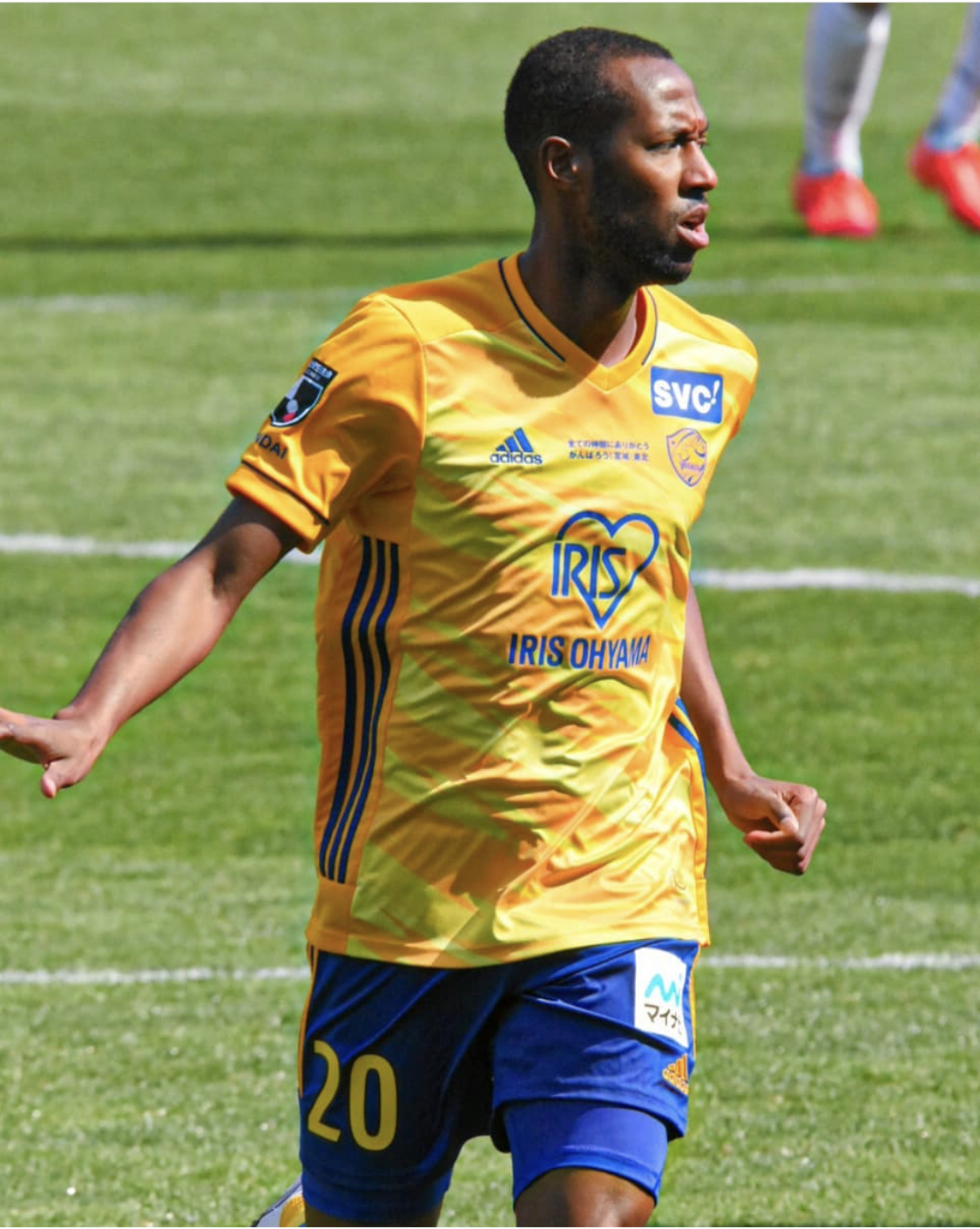
- Martinus with Vegalta Sendai in 2021

Personal information
- Full name: Quenten Geordie Felix Martinus
- Date of birth: 7 March 1991 (age 35)
- Place of birth: Willemstad, Curaçao
- Height: 1.83 m (6 ft 0 in)
- Position: Winger

Youth career
- Cambuur
- Heerenveen

Senior career*
Years	Team	Apps	(Gls)
2010–2013	Heerenveen	7	(0)
2012–2013	→ Sparta Rotterdam (loan)	15	(1)
2013	Ferencváros	7	(0)
2013–2014	Emmen	34	(3)
2014–2016	Botoșani	51	(7)
2016–2017	Yokohama F. Marinos	53	(9)
2018–2020	Urawa Red Diamonds	50	(5)
2021	Vegalta Sendai	15	(3)
2021	Montedio Yamagata	13	(1)
2022–2023	Kyoto Sanga	3	(0)
2023–2024	TOP Oss	1	(0)
Total		249	(29)

International career
	Netherlands U17	3	(0)
2014–2018	Curaçao	9	(1)
- * Club domestic league appearances and goals

Quenten Geordie Felix Martinus (born 7 March 1991) is a Curaçaoan former professional footballer who played as a left winger. He represented the Curaçao national team.

== Club career ==
He has also played for SC Heerenveen, FC Botoșani, Yokohama F. Marinos and Urawa Red Diamonds.

On 2 September 2023, Martinus signed with TOP Oss. After just one appearance for the club, he announced his retirement in January 2024 due to ongoing injuries.

== International career ==
He scored his first national goal for Curaçao against U.S. Virgin Islands in the Concacaf Nations League.

== Career statistics ==
Appearances and goals by club, season and competition
Club	Season	League			National cup		League Cup		Continental		Other		Total	
Club	Season	Division	Apps	Goals	Apps	Goals	Apps	Goals	Apps	Goals	Apps	Goals	Apps	Goals
Heerenveen	2010–11	Eredivisie	1	0	0	0	—		—		—		1	0
Heerenveen	2011–12	Eredivisie	6	0	2	1	—		—		—		8	1
Heerenveen	Total		7	0	2	1	0	0	0	0	0	0	9	1
Sparta Rotterdam (loan)	2012–13	Eerste Divisie	15	1	1	1	—		—		—		16	2
Ferencvárosi	2012–13	Nemzeti Bajnokság I	7	0	0	0	2	0	—		—		9	0
Emmen	2013–14	Eerste Divisie	34	3	2	1	—		—		—		36	4
Botoșani	2014–15	Liga I	30	3	0	0	—		—		—		30	3
Botoșani	2015–16	Liga I	21	4	1	0	—		3 (Note: Appearance(s) in UEFA Europa League)	0	—		25	4
Botoșani	Total		51	7	1	0	0	0	3	0	0	0	55	7
Yokohama F. Marinos	2016	J1 League	24	4	3	0	6	0	—		—		33	4
Yokohama F. Marinos	2017	J1 League	29	5	2	0	0	0	—		—		31	5
Yokohama F. Marinos	Total		53	9	5	0	6	0	0	0	0	0	64	9
Urawa Red Diamonds	2018	J1 League	10	0	3	0	7	1	—		—		20	1
Urawa Red Diamonds	2019	J1 League	17	1	1	0	0	0	0	0	1 (Note: Appearance(s) in Japanese Super Cup)	0	19	1
Urawa Red Diamonds	2020	J1 League	23	4	—		1	1	—		—		24	5
Urawa Red Diamonds	Total		50	5	4	0	8	1	0	0	1	0	63	7
Vegalta Sendai	2021	J1 League	15	3	1	0	3	1	—		—		19	4
Montedio Yamagata	2021	J2 League	13	1	0	0	—		—		—		13	1
Kyoto Sanga	2022	J1 League	3	0	0	0	3	1	—		—		6	1
TOP Oss	2023–24	Eerste Divisie	1	0	0	0	—		—		—		1	0
Career totals			249	29	16	3	22	4	3	0	1	0	291	36

=== International goals ===
Scores and results list Curaçao's goal tally first.

No.	Date	Venue	Opponent	Score	Result	Competition
1.	12 October 2018	IMG Academy, Brandenton, United States	U.S. Virgin Islands	5–0	5–0	2019–20 CONCACAF Nations League qualification

== Honours ==
Ferencváros

- Hungarian League Cup: 2013

Urawa Red Diamonds

- Emperor's Cup: 2018
