= Mike Havekotte =

Dutch footballer (born 1995)

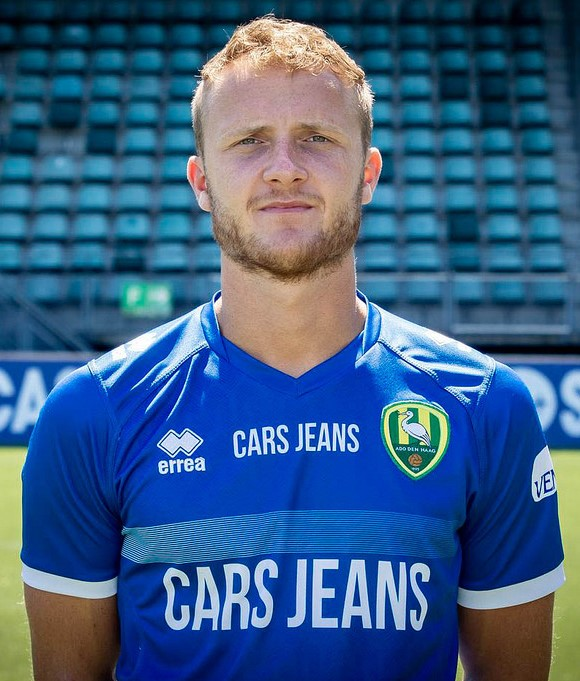
- Havekotte in 2018

Personal information
- Date of birth: 12 September 1995 (age 31)
- Place of birth: Bilthoven, Netherlands
- Height: 1.87 m (6 ft 2 in)
- Position: Goalkeeper

Team information
- Current team: TOP Oss
- Number: 1

Youth career
- DOSC Den Dolder
- 2007–2015: Utrecht

Senior career*
Years	Team	Apps	(Gls)
2015–2018	Excelsior	0	(0)
2018–2021	ADO Den Haag	2	(0)
2020	→ Dordrecht (loan)	9	(0)
2020–2021	→ MVV (loan)	30	(0)
2021–2023	Helmond Sport	76	(0)
2023–	TOP Oss	113	(0)

International career
2012	Netherlands U18	4	(0)
2013	Netherlands U19	2	(0)
- * Club domestic league appearances and goals as of 28 April 2026

Mike Havekotte (born 12 September 1995) is a Dutch professional footballer who plays as a goalkeeper for Eerste Divisie club TOP Oss.

== Club career ==
=== ADO Den Haag ===
Havekotte joined ADO Den Haag on 6 July 2018, after stints as the backup goalkeeper at FC Utrecht and Excelsior. Havekotte made his professional debut with ADO Den Haag in a 4–2 loss to VVV-Venlo on 19 January 2019. In the second half of the 2019–20 season, he was sent on loan to FC Dordrecht and in September 2020, Havekotte joined MVV Maastricht on a one-season loan.

=== Helmond Sport ===
On 30 July 2021, Havekotte signed a two-year contract with an option for an additional year with Helmond Sport. Prior, he had been the starting goalkeeper during his two loan spells with Dordrecht and MVV, respectively. He made his debut for Helmond Sport on 6 August in a 0–2 loss to FC Den Bosch. On 27 August, he held his first clean sheet in a 1–0 win over Jong PSV.

=== TOP Oss ===
On 3 July 2023, Havekotte signed a two-year contract with TOP Oss.

== International career ==
Havekotte was part of the Netherlands U17 who won the 2012 UEFA European Under-17 Championship, but did not make an appearance. Havekotte was a youth international for the Netherlands U18s and Netherlands U19.

== Water polo ==
Havekotte is the son of Robert Havekotte, a Dutch former water polo player. Mike played water polo himself at BZC Brandenburg as a youth, alongside football. He represented a Dutch youth team in water polo, winning a tournament in Ukraine in 2010. Havekotte had to choose between football and water polo, and opted to remain in football because of the greater potential in the sport.

== Career statistics ==
As of match played 22 December 2023

Appearances and goals by club, season and competition
Club	Season	League			KNVB Cup		Other		Total	
Club	Season	Division	Apps	Goals	Apps	Goals	Apps	Goals	Apps	Goals
ADO Den Haag	2018–19	Eredivisie	1	0	0	0	—		1	0
ADO Den Haag	2019–20	Eredivisie	1	0	0	0	—		1	0
ADO Den Haag	Total		2	0	0	0	—		2	0
Dordrecht (loan)	2019–20	Eerste Divisie	9	0	0	0	—		9	0
MVV	2020–21	Eerste Divisie	30	0	1	0	—		31	0
Helmond Sport	2021–22	Eerste Divisie	38	0	1	0	—		39	0
Helmond Sport	2022–23	Eerste Divisie	38	0	1	0	—		39	0
Helmond Sport	Total		76	0	2	0	—		78	0
TOP Oss	2023–24	Eerste Divisie	20	0	1	0	—		21	0
Career total			137	0	4	0	—		141	0

== Honours ==
Netherlands U17

- UEFA European Under-17 Championship: 2012
