= Takuma Arano =

Japanese footballer

Takuma Arano 荒野拓馬
Personal information
- Full name: Takuma Arano
- Date of birth: April 20, 1993 (age 33)
- Place of birth: Sapporo, Hokkaido, Japan
- Height: 1.80 m (5 ft 11 in)
- Position: Midfielder

Team information
- Current team: Hokkaido Consadole Sapporo
- Number: 27

Youth career
- 2001–2005: Sapporo FC
- 2006–2011: Consadole Sapporo

Senior career*
Years	Team	Apps	(Gls)
2010–	Hokkaido Consadole Sapporo	375	(27)
- * Club domestic league appearances and goals as of 13 August 2026

Takuma Arano (荒野 拓馬, Arano Takuma; born April 20, 1993 in Hokkaidō) is a Japanese football player currently playing for Hokkaido Consadole Sapporo.

== Club career stats ==
Updated to 18 February 2020.

Appearances and goals by club, season and competition
Club	Season	League			Emperor's Cup		League Cup		Total	
Club	Season	Division	Apps	Goals	Apps	Goals	Apps	Goals	Apps	Goals
Hokkaido Consadole Sapporo	2010	J2 League	2	0	0	0	—		2	0
Hokkaido Consadole Sapporo	2011	J2 League	2	0	1	0	—		3	0
Hokkaido Consadole Sapporo	2012	J1 League	3	0	0	0	4	0	7	0
Hokkaido Consadole Sapporo	2013	J2 League	30	4	0	0	—		30	4
Hokkaido Consadole Sapporo	2014	J2 League	24	3	1	0	—		25	3
Hokkaido Consadole Sapporo	2015	J2 League	31	2	1	0	—		32	2
Hokkaido Consadole Sapporo	2016	J2 League	18	2	0	0	—		18	2
Hokkaido Consadole Sapporo	2017	J1 League	27	0	0	0	6	0	33	0
Hokkaido Consadole Sapporo	2018	J1 League	26	0	2	0	6	0	34	0
Hokkaido Consadole Sapporo	2019	J1 League	30	1	0	0	7	0	37	1
Hokkaido Consadole Sapporo	2020	J1 League	28	5	0	0	2	0	30	5
Hokkaido Consadole Sapporo	2021	J1 League	28	0	2	0	8	1	38	1
Hokkaido Consadole Sapporo	2022	J1 League	19	1	0	0	5	0	24	1
Career total			268	18	7	0	38	1	313	19
