= Gerrie Damen =

Dutch footballer (born 1956)

Personal information
- Full name: Grad Damen
- Date of birth: 26 June 1956
- Place of birth: Vianen, Netherlands
- Date of death: 24 November 2004 (aged 48)
- Place of death: Breda, Netherlands
- Position: Midfielder

Youth career
- 1970-1974: NAC

Senior career*
Years	Team	Apps	(Gls)
1974–1982	NAC	81	(6)

International career
1977	Netherlands U21	2	(0)
- * Club domestic league appearances and goals

Grad "Gerrie" Damen (26 June 1956 - 24 November 2004) was a Dutch footballer who played in the Eredivisie for NAC as a midfielder.

== International career ==
Born in Vianen, Damen played 2 games for the Netherlands national under-21 football team

== Personal life ==
His grandson called Grad as well is also a footballer, and another grandson also called Grad is a singer.

Nicknamed Bolle, Damen passed away in his sleep in 2004.
