= Grad Damen (footballer, born 1997) =

Dutch footballer

Personal information
- Date of birth: 14 August 1997 (age 29)
- Place of birth: Breda, Netherlands
- Height: 1.84 m (6 ft 0 in)
- Position: Midfielder

Team information
- Current team: Kozakken Boys
- Number: 24

Youth career
- –2006: Sint Anna Boys
- 2006–2015: NAC Breda

Senior career*
Years	Team	Apps	(Gls)
2015–2019	NAC Breda	23	(1)
2017–2018	→ Helmond Sport (loan)	24	(1)
2020–2022	TOP Oss	23	(0)
2022	ASWH	16	(0)
2023	Dandenong Thunder	13	(3)
2023–2024	TOP Oss	23	(3)
2024–	Kozakken Boys	53	(17)
- * Club domestic league appearances and goals as of 17:04, 4 March 2026 (UTC)

Grad Damen (born 14 August 1997) is a Dutch professional footballer who plays as a midfielder for Tweede Divisie club Kozakken Boys.

== Club career ==
Damen joined NAC's youth set-up in 2006 from Sint Anna Boys. He made his professional debut on 23 October 2015 against Sparta. In 2019, his contract at NAC Breda was at the last moment not renewed, resulting in a brief lull in his professional football career.

On 14 January 2020, Damen joined TOP Oss on an amateur contract. After making a good impression, he signed a two-year professional contract six months later. Damen missed almost the entire 2020–21 season due to an injury. On 6 August 2021, he made his comeback in the season opener against Excelsior.

Damen joined Derde Divisie club ASWH on 1 September 2022, leaving the club in the winter break.

On 2 September 2023, Damen returned to TOP Oss.

On 1 August 2024, Damen joined Derde Divisie club Kozakken Boys. In his first season at the club, Kozakken Boys secured promotion back to the Tweede Divisie, the highest level of amateur football in the Netherlands.

== Personal life ==
His grandfather Grad "Gerrie" Damen also played professionally for NAC. Cousin Grad is a well-known Dutch singer.

== Career statistics ==
As of match played 22 December 2023

Appearances and goals by club, season and competition
Club	Season	League			National cup		Other		Total	
Club	Season	Division	Apps	Goals	Apps	Goals	Apps	Goals	Apps	Goals
NAC Breda	2015–16	Eerste Divisie	6	1	0	0	0	0	6	1
NAC Breda	2016–17	Eerste Divisie	13	0	0	0	2 (Note: Appearances in Eredivisie promotion/relegation playoffs)	0	15	0
NAC Breda	2018–19	Eredivisie	4	0	0	0	—		4	0
NAC Breda	Total		23	1	0	0	2	0	25	1
Helmond Sport (loan)	2017–18	Eerste Divisie	24	1	0	0	—		24	1
TOP Oss	2019–20 (Note: Season curtailed due to COVID-19 pandemic in the Netherlands)	Eerste Divisie	7	0	1	0	—		8	0
TOP Oss	2020–21	Eerste Divisie	5	0	0	0	—		5	0
TOP Oss	2021–22	Eerste Divisie	11	0	1	0	—		12	0
TOP Oss	Total		23	0	2	0	—		25	0
ASWH	2022–23	Derde Divisie	16	0	1	0	—		17	0
Dandenong Thunder	2023	NPL Victoria	26	13	0	0	—		26	13
TOP Oss	2023–24	Eerste Divisie	9	0	0	0	—		9	0
Career total			121	15	3	0	2	0	126	15
