= Kosuke Shirai =

Japanese footballer (born 1994)

Kosuke Shirai 白井 康介
Personal information
- Full name: Kosuke Shirai
- Date of birth: 1 May 1994 (age 32)
- Place of birth: Aichi, Japan
- Height: 1.66 m (5 ft 5 in)
- Position: Midfielder

Team information
- Current team: Fagiano Okayama (on loan from FC Tokyo)
- Number: 51

Youth career
- 2001–2006: FC Toyohashi Little J Selecao
- 2007–2009: FC Toyohashi Deuxmilleun
- 2010–2012: Osaka Toin High School

Senior career*
Years	Team	Apps	(Gls)
2013–2015	Shonan Bellmare	1	(0)
2013	→ Fukushima United FC (loan)	30	(4)
2015	→ Ehime FC (loan)	9	(1)
2016–2017	Ehime FC	81	(7)
2018–2020	Hokkaido Consadole Sapporo	60	(2)
2021	→ Kyoto Sanga (loan)	32	(0)
2022–2023	Kyoto Sanga	50	(0)
2023–	FC Tokyo	54	(2)
2026–	→ Fagiano Okayama (loan)	18	(2)
- * Club domestic league appearances and goals as of 12 August 2026

Kosuke Shirai (白井 康介, Shirai Kōsuke; born 1 May 1994 in Aichi) is a Japanese footballer who plays as a midfielder for J1 League club Fagiano Okayama, on loan from FC Tokyo.

== Career statistics ==
As of 25 March 2026.

Appearances and goals by club, season and competition
Club	Season	League			National cup (Note: Includes Emperors Cup)		League cup (Note: Includes J.League Cup)		Other		Total	
Club	Season	Division	Apps	Goals	Apps	Goals	Apps	Goals	Apps	Goals	Apps	Goals
Shonan Bellmare	2014	J.League Division 2	1	0	0	0	0	0	–		1	0
Shonan Bellmare	2015	J2 League	0	0	1	0	2	0	–		3	0
Shonan Bellmare	Total		1	0	1	0	2	0	0	0	4	0
Fukushima United FC (loan)	2013	JFL	30	4	2	1	–		–		32	5
Ehime FC (loan)	2015	J2 League	9	1	0	0	–		1 (Note: Appearance in J1/J2 play-offs)	0	10	1
Ehime FC	2016	J2 League	40	3	2	0	–		0	0	42	3
Ehime FC	2017	J2 League	41	4	2	0	–		0	0	43	4
Ehime FC	Total		81	7	4	0	0	0	0	0	85	7
Hokkaido Consadole Sapporo	2018	J1 League	10	1	2	0	5	0	–		17	1
Hokkaido Consadole Sapporo	2019	J1 League	23	1	1	0	12	0	–		36	1
Hokkaido Consadole Sapporo	2020	J1 League	27	0	0	0	3	0	–		30	0
Hokkaido Consadole Sapporo	Total		60	2	3	0	20	0	0	0	83	2
Kyoto Sanga (loan)	2021	J2 League	32	0	3	0	0	0	0	0	35	0
Kyoto Sanga	2022	J1 League	33	0	2	0	2	0	1	0	38	0
Kyoto Sanga	2023	J1 League	17	0	0	0	2	0	0	0	19	0
Kyoto Sanga	Total		50	0	2	0	4	0	1	0	57	0
FC Tokyo	2023	J1 League	11	0	1	0	2	0	–		14	0
FC Tokyo	2024	J1 League	23	1	0	0	2	0	–		25	1
FC Tokyo	2025	J1 League	20	1	2	0	2	0	–		24	1
FC Tokyo	Total		54	2	3	0	6	0	0	0	63	2
Fagiano Okayama (loan)	2026	J1 (100)	6	0	–		–		–		6	0
Career total			323	16	18	1	32	0	2	0	375	17

== Honours ==
=== Shonan Bellmare ===
- J2 League (1): 2014

=== Hokkaido Consadole Sapporo ===
- J.League Cup (1): 2019 runner-up
