= Yoshiaki Komai =

Japanese footballer

Yoshiaki Komai 駒井 善成
Personal information
- Full name: Yoshiaki Komai
- Date of birth: 6 June 1992 (age 34)
- Place of birth: Yamashina-ku, Kyoto, Japan
- Height: 1.68 m (5 ft 6 in)
- Positions: Attacking midfielder; winger

Team information
- Current team: FC Imabari (on loan from Yokohama FC)
- Number: 14

Youth career
- 2002–2010: Kyoto Sanga

Senior career*
Years	Team	Apps	(Gls)
2011–2015	Kyoto Sanga	171	(15)
2016–2018	Urawa Red Diamonds	47	(0)
2018	→ Hokkaido Consadole Sapporo (loan)	29	(0)
2019–2024	Hokkaido Consadole Sapporo	159	(13)
2025–	Yokohama FC	21	(0)
2026–	→ FC Imabari (loan)	20	(2)
- * Club domestic league appearances and goals as of 17 August 2026

Yoshiaki Komai (駒井 善成, Komai Yoshiaki; born 6 June 1992) is a Japanese footballer who plays for FC Imabari, on loan from Yokohama FC.

== Career ==
He made his debut on 30 April 2011 against Tochigi SC, when he came off the bench to replace Atsutaka Nakamura. He scored his first goal with Kyoto against Ehime FC. However, his most important goal was scored against Yokohama F. Marinos in the semifinal of the 2011 Emperor's Cup when, after having started the match on the bench, he scored the last goal from Kyoto in the extra time, closing a 2-4 win against Yokohama which meant that Kyoto would play its first Cup Final since 2002 Emperor's Cup.

After five years and being named captain at Kyoto, Komai left in January 2016 to join Urawa Red Diamonds. He made his debut for the club against Kashiwa Reysol on 27 February 2016

He made his debut for Consadole Sapporo on 24 February 2018 against Sanfrecce Hiroshima. He scored his first goal for the club against Yokohama F. Marinos on 26 July 2020.

== Career statistics ==
=== Club ===
Updated to 18 February 2019.

Club	Season	League		Cup		League Cup		AFC		Other^{1}		Total	
Club	Season	Apps	Goals	Apps	Goals	Apps	Goals	Apps	Goals	Apps	Goals	Apps	Goals
Kyoto Sanga	2011	25	1	3	1	–		–		–		28	2
Kyoto Sanga	2012	32	6	2	1	–		–		1	0	35	7
Kyoto Sanga	2013	39	4	1	0	–		–		2	0	42	4
Kyoto Sanga	2014	40	1	2	0	–		–		–		42	1
Kyoto Sanga	2015	35	3	3	1	–		–		–		38	4
Urawa Red Diamonds	2016	23	0	1	0	2	0	6	0	2	0	34	0
Urawa Red Diamonds	2017	24	0	3	0	1	0	9	1	2	0	39	1
Hokkaido Consadole Sapporo	2018	29	0	1	0	1	0	–		–		31	0
Total		247	15	16	3	4	0	15	1	5	0	287	19

^{1}Includes Promotion Playoffs to Division 1, J. League Championship, Japanese Super Cup, Suruga Bank Championship and FIFA Club World Cup.
