= Shunta Awaka =

Japanese footballer (born 1995)

Shunta Awaka 阿波加 俊太
Personal information
- Full name: Shunta Awaka
- Date of birth: 7 February 1995 (age 31)
- Place of birth: Iwamizawa, Hokkaido, Japan
- Height: 1.88 m (6 ft 2 in)
- Position: Goalkeeper

Youth career
- Sorachi FC
- Consadole Sapporo

Senior career*
Years	Team	Apps	(Gls)
2013–2022	Hokkaido Consadole Sapporo	1	(0)
2014	→ SC Sagamihara (loan)	1	(0)
2014	→ J. League U-22 (loan)	4	(0)
2015	→ Honda FC (loan)	15	(0)
2017	→ Ehime FC (loan)	0	(0)
2022–2023	Suzuka Point Getters	18	(0)
2024	Hokkaido Consadole Sapporo	2	(0)

International career
2011	Japan U-17	1	(0)
- * Club domestic league appearances and goals as of 16 December 2024, 18:22 (UTC)

Shunta Awaka (阿波加 俊太, Awaka Shunta; born February 7, 1995 in Hokkaido) is a Japanese former football player who play as a goalkeeper.

== Career ==
On 10 January 2025, Awaka announcement officially retirement from football after 12 years as professional career.

== National team career ==
In June 2011, Awaka was elected Japan U-17 national team for 2011 U-17 World Cup. He played 1 match against New Zealand.

== Club statistics ==
Updated to 18 February 2019.

Club performance			League		Cup		League Cup		Total	
Season	Club	League	Apps	Goals	Apps	Goals	Apps	Goals	Apps	Goals
Japan			League		Emperor's Cup		J. League Cup		Total	
2013	Consadole Sapporo	J2 League	0	0	1	0	–		1	0
2014	SC Sagamihara	J3 League	1	0	–		–		1	0
2014	Consadole Sapporo	J2 League	0	0	1	0	–		1	0
2015	Consadole Sapporo	J2 League	0	0	–		–		0	0
2015	Honda FC	JFL	15	0	–		–		15	0
2016	Hokkaido Consadole Sapporo	J2 League	1	0	2	0	–		3	0
2017	Ehime FC	J2 League	0	0	0	0	–		0	0
2018	Hokkaido Consadole Sapporo	J1 League	0	0	0	0	0	0	0	0
Total			17	0	4	0	–		21	0
