= Takurō Kaneko =

Japanese footballer (born 1997)

Takurō Kaneko 金子 拓郎
Personal information
- Date of birth: 30 July 1997 (age 29)
- Place of birth: Saitama, Japan
- Height: 1.78 m (5 ft 10 in)
- Positions: Winger; midfielder

Team information
- Current team: Urawa Red Diamonds
- Number: 7

Youth career
- –2009: Ogawa SSS
- 2010–2012: Kumagaya SC
- 2013–2015: Maebashi Ikuei High School

College career
Years	Team	Apps	(Gls)
2016–2019	Nihon University		

Senior career*
Years	Team	Apps	(Gls)
2019–2024	Hokkaido Consadole Sapporo	123	(21)
2023–2024	→ Dinamo Zagreb (loan)	28	(2)
2024–2025	Kortrijk	16	(1)
2025–	Urawa Red Diamonds	54	(4)
- * Club domestic league appearances and goals as of 10 August 2026

Takurō Kaneko (金子 拓郎, Kaneko Takurō; born 30 July 1997) is a Japanese professional footballer who plays as a winger or midfielder for Urawa Red Diamonds.

== Career ==
On 4 January 2025, Kaneko returned to Japan to join Urawa Red Diamonds.
