= 2017 Albirex Niigata season =

Albirex Niigata
2017 season
- Manager: Fumitake Miura; Koichiro Katafuchi; Wagner Lopes
- Stadium: Denka Big Swan Stadium
- J1 League: 17th
Home colours	Away colours

2017 Albirex Niigata season.

== J1 League ==
=== League table ===
Pos	Team	Pld	W	D	L	GF	GA	GD	Pts	Qualification or relegation
14	Shimizu S-Pulse	34	8	10	16	36	54	−18	34	
15	Sanfrecce Hiroshima	34	8	9	17	32	49	−17	33	
16	Ventforet Kofu (R)	34	7	11	16	23	39	−16	32	Relegation to 2018 J2 League
17	Albirex Niigata (R)	34	7	7	20	28	60	−32	28	Relegation to 2018 J2 League
18	Omiya Ardija (R)	34	5	10	19	28	60	−32	25	Relegation to 2018 J2 League

Source: Meiji Yasuda J1 League
Rules for classification: 1) Points; 2) Goal difference; 3) Goals scored
(R) Relegated

=== Match details ===
J1 League match details
Match	Date	Team	Score	Team	Venue	Attendance
1	2017.02.25	Sanfrecce Hiroshima	1-1	Albirex Niigata	Edion Stadium Hiroshima	17,545
2	2017.03.04	Vissel Kobe	2-1	Albirex Niigata	Noevir Stadium Kobe	25,278
3	2017.03.11	Albirex Niigata	0-2	Shimizu S-Pulse	Denka Big Swan Stadium	31,014
4	2017.03.18	Yokohama F. Marinos	1-1	Albirex Niigata	Nissan Stadium	20,191
5	2017.04.01	Albirex Niigata	2-3	Gamba Osaka	Denka Big Swan Stadium	20,043
6	2017.04.08	Sagan Tosu	3-0	Albirex Niigata	Best Amenity Stadium	8,990
7	2017.04.16	Ventforet Kofu	0-2	Albirex Niigata	Yamanashi Chuo Bank Stadium	10,472
8	2017.04.22	Albirex Niigata	0-3	FC Tokyo	Denka Big Swan Stadium	18,292
9	2017.04.30	Albirex Niigata	0-1	Kashiwa Reysol	Denka Big Swan Stadium	19,782
10	2017.05.05	Kawasaki Frontale	3-0	Albirex Niigata	Kawasaki Todoroki Stadium	25,095
11	2017.05.14	Albirex Niigata	1-6	Urawa Reds	Denka Big Swan Stadium	30,864
12	2017.05.20	Albirex Niigata	1-0	Hokkaido Consadole Sapporo	Denka Big Swan Stadium	19,253
13	2017.05.28	Vegalta Sendai	2-1	Albirex Niigata	Yurtec Stadium Sendai	14,259
14	2017.06.04	Cerezo Osaka	4-0	Albirex Niigata	Kincho Stadium	13,363
15	2017.06.17	Albirex Niigata	1-2	Omiya Ardija	Denka Big Swan Stadium	27,605
16	2017.06.25	Kashima Antlers	2-0	Albirex Niigata	Kashima Soccer Stadium	14,136
17	2017.07.01	Albirex Niigata	0-2	Júbilo Iwata	Denka Big Swan Stadium	22,379
18	2017.07.09	Urawa Reds	2-1	Albirex Niigata	Saitama Stadium 2002	28,740
19	2017.07.30	FC Tokyo	1-1	Albirex Niigata	Ajinomoto Stadium	21,908
20	2017.08.05	Albirex Niigata	0-2	Yokohama F. Marinos	Denka Big Swan Stadium	24,137
21	2017.08.09	Albirex Niigata	0-2	Kawasaki Frontale	Denka Big Swan Stadium	18,016
22	2017.08.13	Omiya Ardija	1-0	Albirex Niigata	NACK5 Stadium Omiya	10,900
23	2017.08.19	Albirex Niigata	1-2	Vegalta Sendai	Denka Big Swan Stadium	21,011
24	2017.08.26	Kashiwa Reysol	1-1	Albirex Niigata	Hitachi Kashiwa Stadium	12,760
25	2017.09.09	Albirex Niigata	0-0	Sanfrecce Hiroshima	Denka Big Swan Stadium	21,456
26	2017.09.16	Albirex Niigata	2-4	Kashima Antlers	Denka Big Swan Stadium	25,453
27	2017.09.23	Hokkaido Consadole Sapporo	2-2	Albirex Niigata	Sapporo Dome	17,621
28	2017.09.30	Albirex Niigata	0-2	Vissel Kobe	Denka Big Swan Stadium	21,709
29	2017.10.14	Gamba Osaka	0-1	Albirex Niigata	Suita City Football Stadium	19,523
30	2017.10.21	Júbilo Iwata	2-2	Albirex Niigata	Yamaha Stadium	11,762
31	2017.10.29	Albirex Niigata	1-0	Sagan Tosu	Denka Big Swan Stadium	17,426
32	2017.11.18	Albirex Niigata	1-0	Ventforet Kofu	Denka Big Swan Stadium	16,461
33	2017.11.26	Shimizu S-Pulse	2-3	Albirex Niigata	IAI Stadium Nihondaira	17,091
34	2017.12.02	Albirex Niigata	1-0	Cerezo Osaka	Denka Big Swan Stadium	19,684
