= Ryōsuke Shindō =

Japanese footballer

Ryōsuke Shindō 進藤 亮佑
Personal information
- Full name: Ryōsuke Shindō
- Date of birth: 7 June 1996 (age 30)
- Place of birth: Sapporo, Japan
- Height: 1.83 m (6 ft 0 in)
- Position: Centre back

Team information
- Current team: V-Varen Nagasaki
- Number: 50

Youth career
- SSS Sapporo Soccer School
- SSS SC
- –2014: Consadole Sapporo

Senior career*
Years	Team	Apps	(Gls)
2015–2020	Hokkaido Consadole Sapporo	119	(10)
2015	→ J. League U-22 (loan)	14	(2)
2021–2025	Cerezo Osaka	75	(7)
2026–	V-Varen Nagasaki	9	(0)

International career
2019–	Japan	0	(0)
- * Club domestic league appearances and goals as of 11 August 2026

Ryōsuke Shindō (進藤 亮佑, Shindō Ryōsuke; born 7 June 1996 in Sapporo) is a Japanese professional footballer who plays as a centre back for J1 League club V-Varen Nagasaki.

== Career ==
On 21 December 2020, Shindō was announced at Cerezo Osaka.

== Club statistics ==
As of 24 March 2026.

Appearances and goals by club, season and competition
Club	Season	League			National cup (Note: Includes Emperors Cup)		League cup (Note: Includes J.League Cup)		Total	
Club	Season	Division	Apps	Goals	Apps	Goals	Apps	Goals	Apps	Goals
Hokkaido Consadole Sapporo	2015		0	0	2	1	0	0	2	1
Hokkaido Consadole Sapporo	2016	J2 League	23	0	0	0	0	0	23	0
Hokkaido Consadole Sapporo	2017	J1 League	8	0	1	0	8	1	17	1
Hokkaido Consadole Sapporo	2018	J1 League	34	4	1	0	0	0	35	4
Hokkaido Consadole Sapporo	2019	J1 League	33	6	0	0	7	0	40	6
Hokkaido Consadole Sapporo	2020	J1 League	21	0	0	0	4	0	25	0
Hokkaido Consadole Sapporo	Total		119	10	4	1	19	1	142	12
J.League U-22 Selection (loan)	2015	J3 League	14	2	–		–		14	2
Cerezo Osaka	2021	J1 League	9	2	1	0	0	0	10	2
Cerezo Osaka	2022	J1 League	7	2	3	0	5	0	15	2
Cerezo Osaka	2023	J1 League	28	1	1	0	5	0	34	1
Cerezo Osaka	2024	J1 League	9	0	0	0	0	0	9	0
Cerezo Osaka	2025	J1 League	22	2	1	0	3	0	26	2
Cerezo Osaka	Total		75	7	6	0	13	0	94	7
V-Varen Nagasaki	2026	J1 (100)	5	0	–		–		5	0
Career total			213	19	10	1	32	1	255	21
