= 2014 Albirex Niigata season =

Albirex Niigata
2014 season
- Manager: Masaaki Yanagishita
- Stadium: Denka Big Swan Stadium
- J1 League: 12th
- Average home league attendance: 22,979

2014 Albirex Niigata season.

== J1 League ==
Pos	Team	Pld	W	D	L	GF	GA	GD	Pts
10	Nagoya Grampus	34	13	9	12	47	48	−1	48
11	Vissel Kobe	34	11	12	11	49	50	−1	45
12	Albirex Niigata	34	12	8	14	30	36	−6	44
13	Ventforet Kofu	34	9	14	11	27	31	−4	41
14	Vegalta Sendai	34	9	11	14	35	50	−15	38

Updated to match(es) played on 8 December 2014. Source: J.League Data
Rules for classification: 1) points; 2) goal difference; 3) number of goals scored.

Match	Date	Team	Score	Team	Venue	Attendance
1	2014.03.01	Vegalta Sendai	1-2	Albirex Niigata	Yurtec Stadium Sendai	15,852
2	2014.03.08	Albirex Niigata	0-2	Gamba Osaka	Denka Big Swan Stadium	22,931
3	2014.03.15	Ventforet Kofu	1-1	Albirex Niigata	Yamanashi Chuo Bank Stadium	9,106
4	2014.03.23	Albirex Niigata	1-0	Sagan Tosu	Denka Big Swan Stadium	21,278
5	2014.03.29	Cerezo Osaka	0-0	Albirex Niigata	Kincho Stadium	15,232
6	2014.04.06	Albirex Niigata	0-0	Yokohama F. Marinos	Denka Big Swan Stadium	21,132
7	2014.04.12	Kashima Antlers	1-2	Albirex Niigata	Kashima Soccer Stadium	11,953
8	2014.04.20	Albirex Niigata	0-0	Sanfrecce Hiroshima	Denka Big Swan Stadium	21,452
9	2014.04.26	Tokushima Vortis	1-2	Albirex Niigata	Pocarisweat Stadium	6,096
10	2014.04.29	Albirex Niigata	1-1	Vissel Kobe	Denka Big Swan Stadium	23,442
11	2014.05.03	Omiya Ardija	2-2	Albirex Niigata	NACK5 Stadium Omiya	12,105
12	2014.05.06	Albirex Niigata	2-1	Shimizu S-Pulse	Denka Big Swan Stadium	35,533
13	2014.05.10	Kashiwa Reysol	1-0	Albirex Niigata	Hitachi Kashiwa Stadium	11,003
14	2014.05.17	Albirex Niigata	1-1	Nagoya Grampus	Denka Big Swan Stadium	24,176
15	2014.07.19	Urawa Reds	1-0	Albirex Niigata	Saitama Stadium 2002	30,776
16	2014.07.23	Albirex Niigata	0-1	FC Tokyo	Denka Big Swan Stadium	17,348
17	2014.07.27	Kawasaki Frontale	1-0	Albirex Niigata	Kawasaki Todoroki Stadium	19,254
18	2014.08.02	Albirex Niigata	1-0	Cerezo Osaka	Denka Big Swan Stadium	30,078
19	2014.08.09	Vissel Kobe	1-0	Albirex Niigata	Noevir Stadium Kobe	11,303
20	2014.08.16	Albirex Niigata	2-1	Omiya Ardija	Denka Big Swan Stadium	26,949
21	2014.08.23	Albirex Niigata	1-2	Tokushima Vortis	Denka Big Swan Stadium	24,903
22	2014.08.30	Gamba Osaka	5-0	Albirex Niigata	Expo '70 Commemorative Stadium	12,696
23	2014.09.13	Albirex Niigata	1-0	Vegalta Sendai	Denka Big Swan Stadium	23,981
24	2014.09.20	Sanfrecce Hiroshima	2-0	Albirex Niigata	Edion Stadium Hiroshima	11,937
25	2014.09.23	Albirex Niigata	0-2	Urawa Reds	Denka Big Swan Stadium	28,303
26	2014.09.27	Nagoya Grampus	0-1	Albirex Niigata	Nagoya Mizuho Athletic Stadium	11,652
27	2014.10.05	Albirex Niigata	3-0	Kawasaki Frontale	Denka Big Swan Stadium	17,265
28	2014.10.18	Albirex Niigata	0-0	Ventforet Kofu	Denka Big Swan Stadium	21,964
29	2014.10.22	Shimizu S-Pulse	2-1	Albirex Niigata	IAI Stadium Nihondaira	8,539
30	2014.10.26	Sagan Tosu	0-2	Albirex Niigata	Best Amenity Stadium	10,386
31	2014.11.02	Albirex Niigata	1-2	Kashima Antlers	Denka Big Swan Stadium	27,809
32	2014.11.22	FC Tokyo	1-3	Albirex Niigata	Ajinomoto Stadium	42,059
33	2014.11.29	Yokohama F. Marinos	1-0	Albirex Niigata	Nissan Stadium	29,379
34	2014.12.08	Albirex Niigata	0-2	Kashiwa Reysol	Kashima Soccer Stadium	2,104
