= Daiki Suga =

Japanese footballer

Daiki Suga 菅 大輝
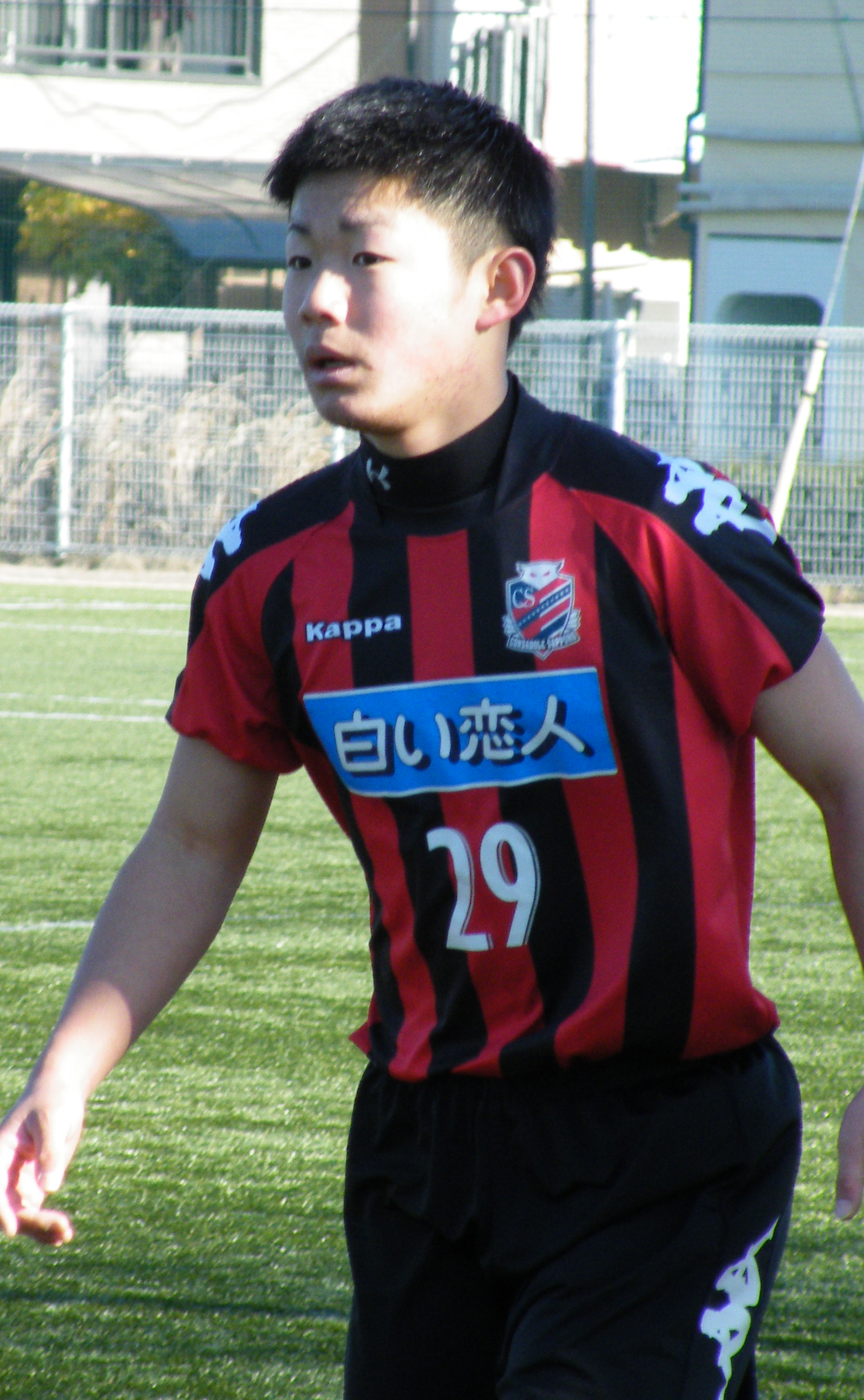
- Suga with Hokkaido Consadole Sapporo in 2014

Personal information
- Full name: Daiki Suga
- Date of birth: September 10, 1998 (age 28)
- Place of birth: Otaru, Hokkaido, Japan
- Height: 1.71 m (5 ft 7 1/2 in)
- Positions: Left winger; left back

Team information
- Current team: Sanfrecce Hiroshima
- Number: 18

Youth career
- –2016: Hokkaido Consadole Sapporo

Senior career*
| Years | Team | Apps | (Gls) |
| 2016–2024 | Hokkaido Consadole Sapporo | 255 | (13) |
| 2025– | Sanfrecce Hiroshima | 23 | (1) |

International career^{‡}
| 2015 | Japan U-17 | 1 | (0) |
| 2016 | Japan U-18 | 2 | (0) |
| 2018 | Japan U-21 | 2 | (0) |
| 2018– | Japan U-23 | 0 | (0) |
| 2019– | Japan | 1 | (1) |
- * Club domestic league appearances and goals as of 9 August 2026 ‡ National team caps and goals as of December 18, 2019

Daiki Suga (菅 大輝, Suga Daiki; born September 10, 1998) is a Japanese football player. He plays for Sanfrecce Hiroshima.

== International career ==
On May 24, 2019, Suga has been called by Japan's head coach Hajime Moriyasu to feature in the Copa América played in Brazil.

== Career statistics ==
=== Club ===
Updated to 18 February 2019.

Appearances and goals by club, season and competition
| Club | Season | League | | | Emperor's Cup | | J.League Cup | | Total | |
| Club | Season | Division | Apps | Goals | Apps | Goals | Apps | Goals | Apps | Goals |
|---|---|---|---|---|---|---|---|---|---|---|
| Hokkaido Consadole Sapporo | 2016 | J2 League | 5 | 0 | 2 | 0 | – | | 7 | 0 |
| Hokkaido Consadole Sapporo | 2017 | J1 League | 23 | 1 | 1 | 0 | 6 | 0 | 30 | 1 |
| Hokkaido Consadole Sapporo | 2018 | J1 League | 33 | 1 | 1 | 0 | 1 | 0 | 35 | 1 |
| Career total | | | 61 | 2 | 4 | 0 | 7 | 0 | 72 | 1 |

=== International ===
Japan national team
| Year | Apps | Goals |
|---|---|---|
| 2019 | 1 | 1 |
| Total | 1 | 1 |

==== International goals ====
Scores and results list Japan's goal tally first.

| No | Date | Venue | Opponent | Score | Result | Competition |
|---|---|---|---|---|---|---|
| 1. | 10 December 2019 | Busan Gudeok Stadium, Busan, South Korea | Hong Kong | 1–0 | 5–0 | 2019 EAFF E-1 Football Championship |

== Honours ==
Sanfrecce Hiroshima

- Japanese Super Cup: 2025
