= Akito Fukumori =

Japanese footballer

Akito Fukumori 福森 晃斗
Personal information
- Full name: Akito Fukumori
- Date of birth: December 16, 1992 (age 33)
- Place of birth: Fujisawa, Kanagawa, Japan
- Height: 1.83 m (6 ft 0 in)
- Position: Centre back

Team information
- Current team: Hokkaido Consadole Sapporo
- Number: 5

Youth career
- FC Takaya 04
- 2005–2007: Muraoka Junior High School
- 2008–2010: Toko Gakuen High School

Senior career*
Years	Team	Apps	(Gls)
2011–2016	Kawasaki Frontale	16	(1)
2015–2016	→ Hokkaido Consadole Sapporo (loan)	78	(7)
2017–	Hokkaido Consadole Sapporo	225	(11)
2024–2025	→ Yokohama FC (loan)	66	(2)
- * Club domestic league appearances and goals as of 14:49, 8 April 2026 (UTC)

Akito Fukumori (福森 晃斗, born December 16, 1992) is a Japanese footballer who plays as a centre back for J2 League club Hokkaido Consadole Sapporo.

== Career ==
In 2015, Fukumori was announced at Hokkaido Consadole Sapporo on loan.

On 29 December 2023, Fukumori was announced on loan at Yokohama FC. One year later, Yokohama extended the loan for the 2025 season after he played in all 38 league matches.

== Club statistics ==
As of 8 April 2026.

Appearances and goals by club, season and competition
Club	Season	League			National cup (Note: Includes Emperors Cup)		League cup (Note: Includes J.League Cup)		Total	
Club	Season	Division	Apps	Goals	Apps	Goals	Apps	Goals	Apps	Goals
Kawasaki Frontale	2011	J.League Division 1	2	0	0	0	1	0	3	0
Kawasaki Frontale	2012	J.League Division 1	3	0	0	0	0	0	3	0
Kawasaki Frontale	2013	J.League Division 1	6	0	2	0	2	0	10	0
Kawasaki Frontale	2014	J.League Division 1	5	1	1	0	0	0	6	1
Kawasaki Frontale	Total		16	1	3	0	3	0	22	1
Hokkaido Consadole Sapporo (loan)	2015	J2 League	39	4	2	0	0	0	41	4
Hokkaido Consadole Sapporo (loan)	2016	J2 League	39	3	1	0	0	0	40	3
Hokkaido Consadole Sapporo (loan)	Total		78	7	3	0	0	0	81	7
Hokkaido Consadole Sapporo	2017	J1 League	33	3	1	0	3	1	37	4
Hokkaido Consadole Sapporo	2018	J1 League	31	2	2	0	0	0	33	2
Hokkaido Consadole Sapporo	2019	J1 League	33	2	0	0	10	3	43	5
Hokkaido Consadole Sapporo	2020	J1 League	30	2	0	0	2	1	32	3
Hokkaido Consadole Sapporo	2021	J1 League	32	1	1	0	6	0	39	1
Hokkaido Consadole Sapporo	2022	J1 League	29	1	1	0	2	0	32	1
Hokkaido Consadole Sapporo	2023	J1 League	29	0	3	1	6	0	38	1
Hokkaido Consadole Sapporo	2026	J2/J3 (100)	8	0	0	0	0	0	8	0
Hokkaido Consadole Sapporo	Total		225	11	8	1	29	5	262	17
Yokohama FC (loan)	2024	J2 League	38	2	0	0	0	0	38	2
Yokohama FC (loan)	2025	J1 League	28	0	1	0	7	0	36	0
Yokohama FC (loan)	Total		66	2	1	0	7	0	74	2
Career total			385	21	15	1	39	5	439	27
