= 2015 Albirex Niigata season =

Albirex Niigata
2015 season
- Manager: Masaaki Yanagishita
- Stadium: Denka Big Swan Stadium
- J1 League: 15th

2015 Albirex Niigata season.

== J1 League ==
=== League table ===
Pos	Team	Pld	W	D	L	GF	GA	GD	Pts	Qualification or relegation
14	Vegalta Sendai	34	9	8	17	44	48	−4	35	
15	Albirex Niigata	34	8	10	16	41	58	−17	34	
16	Matsumoto Yamaga (R)	34	7	7	20	30	54	−24	28	Relegation to 2016 J2 League

Updated to match(es) played on 28 November 2015. Source: Meiji Yasuda J1 League Standings
Rules for classification: 1) Points; 2) Goal difference; 3) Goals scored
(R) Relegated

=== Match details ===
J1 League match details
Match	Date	Team	Score	Team	Venue	Attendance
1-1	2015.03.07	Sagan Tosu	2-1	Albirex Niigata	Best Amenity Stadium	11,580
1-2	2015.03.14	Albirex Niigata	0-0	Shimizu S-Pulse	Denka Big Swan Stadium	19,537
1-3	2015.03.22	Albirex Niigata	3-2	Kashiwa Reysol	Denka Big Swan Stadium	18,193
1-4	2015.04.04	Kawasaki Frontale	4-1	Albirex Niigata	Kawasaki Todoroki Stadium	17,643
1-5	2015.04.12	Kashima Antlers	1-1	Albirex Niigata	Kashima Soccer Stadium	10,261
1-6	2015.04.18	Albirex Niigata	2-2	Vissel Kobe	Denka Big Swan Stadium	16,068
1-7	2015.04.26	Gamba Osaka	2-1	Albirex Niigata	Expo '70 Commemorative Stadium	17,417
1-8	2015.04.29	Albirex Niigata	0-1	FC Tokyo	Denka Big Swan Stadium	22,318
1-9	2015.05.02	Matsumoto Yamaga FC	1-2	Albirex Niigata	Matsumotodaira Park Stadium	18,398
1-10	2015.05.06	Albirex Niigata	1-1	Montedio Yamagata	Denka Big Swan Stadium	25,009
1-11	2015.05.10	Yokohama F. Marinos	1-0	Albirex Niigata	Nissan Stadium	19,784
1-12	2015.05.16	Albirex Niigata	0-3	Vegalta Sendai	Denka Big Swan Stadium	16,764
1-13	2015.05.23	Sanfrecce Hiroshima	4-2	Albirex Niigata	Edion Stadium Hiroshima	10,460
1-14	2015.05.30	Albirex Niigata	0-2	Ventforet Kofu	Denka Big Swan Stadium	23,197
1-15	2015.06.07	Albirex Niigata	1-1	Nagoya Grampus	Denka Big Swan Stadium	19,030
1-16	2015.06.20	Shonan Bellmare	1-3	Albirex Niigata	Shonan BMW Stadium Hiratsuka	11,175
1-17	2015.06.27	Urawa Reds	5-2	Albirex Niigata	Saitama Stadium 2002	43,606
2-1	2015.07.11	Albirex Niigata	2-3	Kashima Antlers	Denka Big Swan Stadium	24,316
2-2	2015.07.15	FC Tokyo	3-1	Albirex Niigata	Ajinomoto Stadium	12,727
2-3	2015.07.19	Albirex Niigata	1-0	Sagan Tosu	Denka Big Swan Stadium	17,259
2-4	2015.07.25	Montedio Yamagata	1-3	Albirex Niigata	ND Soft Stadium Yamagata	11,206
2-5	2015.07.29	Albirex Niigata	2-2	Gamba Osaka	Denka Big Swan Stadium	19,650
2-6	2015.08.12	Albirex Niigata	1-2	Urawa Reds	Denka Big Swan Stadium	27,447
2-7	2015.08.16	Shimizu S-Pulse	1-1	Albirex Niigata	IAI Stadium Nihondaira	14,724
2-8	2015.08.22	Albirex Niigata	0-2	Sanfrecce Hiroshima	Denka Big Swan Stadium	19,615
2-9	2015.08.29	Vegalta Sendai	0-1	Albirex Niigata	Yurtec Stadium Sendai	14,573
2-10	2015.09.12	Albirex Niigata	1-1	Yokohama F. Marinos	Denka Big Swan Stadium	25,336
2-11	2015.09.19	Vissel Kobe	1-2	Albirex Niigata	Kobe Universiade Memorial Stadium	14,471
2-12	2015.09.26	Albirex Niigata	1-2	Kawasaki Frontale	Denka Big Swan Stadium	22,573
2-13	2015.10.03	Ventforet Kofu	0-0	Albirex Niigata	Yamanashi Chuo Bank Stadium	11,102
2-14	2015.10.17	Albirex Niigata	2-0	Matsumoto Yamaga FC	Denka Big Swan Stadium	31,324
2-15	2015.10.24	Nagoya Grampus	4-2	Albirex Niigata	Paloma Mizuho Stadium	12,045
2-16	2015.11.07	Albirex Niigata	0-2	Shonan Bellmare	Denka Big Swan Stadium	25,272
2-17	2015.11.22	Kashiwa Reysol	1-1	Albirex Niigata	Hitachi Kashiwa Stadium	13,127
