= Grad Damen (singer) =

Grad Damen is a Dutch singer and tattoo artist.

His grandfather Gerrie and cousin also called Grad were both footballers.
