= Enrico Hernández =

Salvadoran footballer (born 2001)

Enrico Dueñas
Personal information
- Full name: Enrico Erick Dueñas Hernández Bisschop
- Date of birth: 23 February 2001 (age 25)
- Place of birth: Almere, Netherlands
- Height: 1.79 m (5 ft 10 in)
- Position: Attacking midfielder

Team information
- Current team: Alianza
- Number: 14

Youth career
- 2012–2014: Almere City
- 2014–2016: Waterwijk
- 2016–2018: Ajax
- 2018–2020: Vitesse

Senior career*
| Years | Team | Apps | (Gls) |
| 2020–2022 | Vitesse | 2 | (0) |
| 2021 | → FC Eindhoven (loan) | 14 | (3) |
| 2022–2023 | Cartagena B | 21 | (0) |
| 2023–2025 | TOP Oss | 18 | (1) |
| 2025–2026 | Alianza (SLV) | 26 | (8) |

International career^{‡}
| 2017 | Netherlands U16 | 2 | (0) |
| 2021 | El Salvador U23 | 3 | (0) |
| 2021– | El Salvador | 23 | (1) |
- * Club domestic league appearances and goals as of 10 October 2026 ‡ National team caps and goals as of 14 October 2025

Enrico Erick Dueñas Hernández Bisschop (born 23 February 2001) is a professional footballer who last played as an attacking midfielder for Primera División club Alianza. Born in the Netherlands, he represents the El Salvador national team.

== Club career ==
Hernández is a youth product of Almere, Waterwijk, and Ajax before moving to Vitesse's youth academy in 2018. He made his professional debut with Vitesse in a 2–0 win over Willem II on 17 December 2020. The next day, on 18 December, Hernández signed his first professional contract with Vitesse for 2.5 years.

On 4 August, it was announced that Hernandez extended his contract with Vitesse until 2024 and that he would be loaned out to Eerste Divisie club FC Eindhoven for one season. He was recalled by Vitesse in December 2021.

On 10 July 2022, Hernández moved to Cartagena B in Spain on a two-year deal.

On 26 July 2023, Hernández returned to the Netherlands and signed a two-year contract with TOP Oss.

== International career ==
Hernández was eligible to represent Netherlands, Finland, El Salvador and Curaçao. He was born in the Netherlands to a Salvadoran father and Finnish mother, while his paternal grandfather is from Curaçao.

Hernández was called up to the El Salvador U-23 team on 8 March 2021 ahead of the CONCACAF Men's Olympic Qualifying Championship. He made his debut with the El Salvador U23s in a 2–0 loss to the Canada U23s on 19 March 2021. On 8 April 2021, it was revealed that Football Association of Finland contacted Hernandez with the hope that he would play for the Finland national football team. Hernandez declined, opting to represent El Salvador.

Hernández was named in El Salvador's preliminary 2021 CONCACAF Gold Cup roster but ultimately did not make the final cut; opting to focus on his club career with Vitesse. He made his senior debut for El Salvador on 2 September 2021, against the United States in their opening match of the final round of the 2022 FIFA World Cup qualifiers, entering as a substitute in a 0–0 draw at Estadio Cuscatlán. The next month on 7 October, Hernández scored his first goal for El Salvador against Panama, netting the game-winner in a 1–0 victory.

=== International goals ===
List of international goals scored by Enrico Hernández
| No. | Date | Venue | Opponent | Score | Result | Competition |
|---|---|---|---|---|---|---|
| 1. | 7 October 2021 | Estadio Cuscatlán, San Salvador, El Salvador | Panama | 1–0 | 1–0 | 2022 FIFA World Cup qualification |
