= Gu Sung-yun =

South Korean footballer (born 1994)

Gu Sung-yun 구성윤
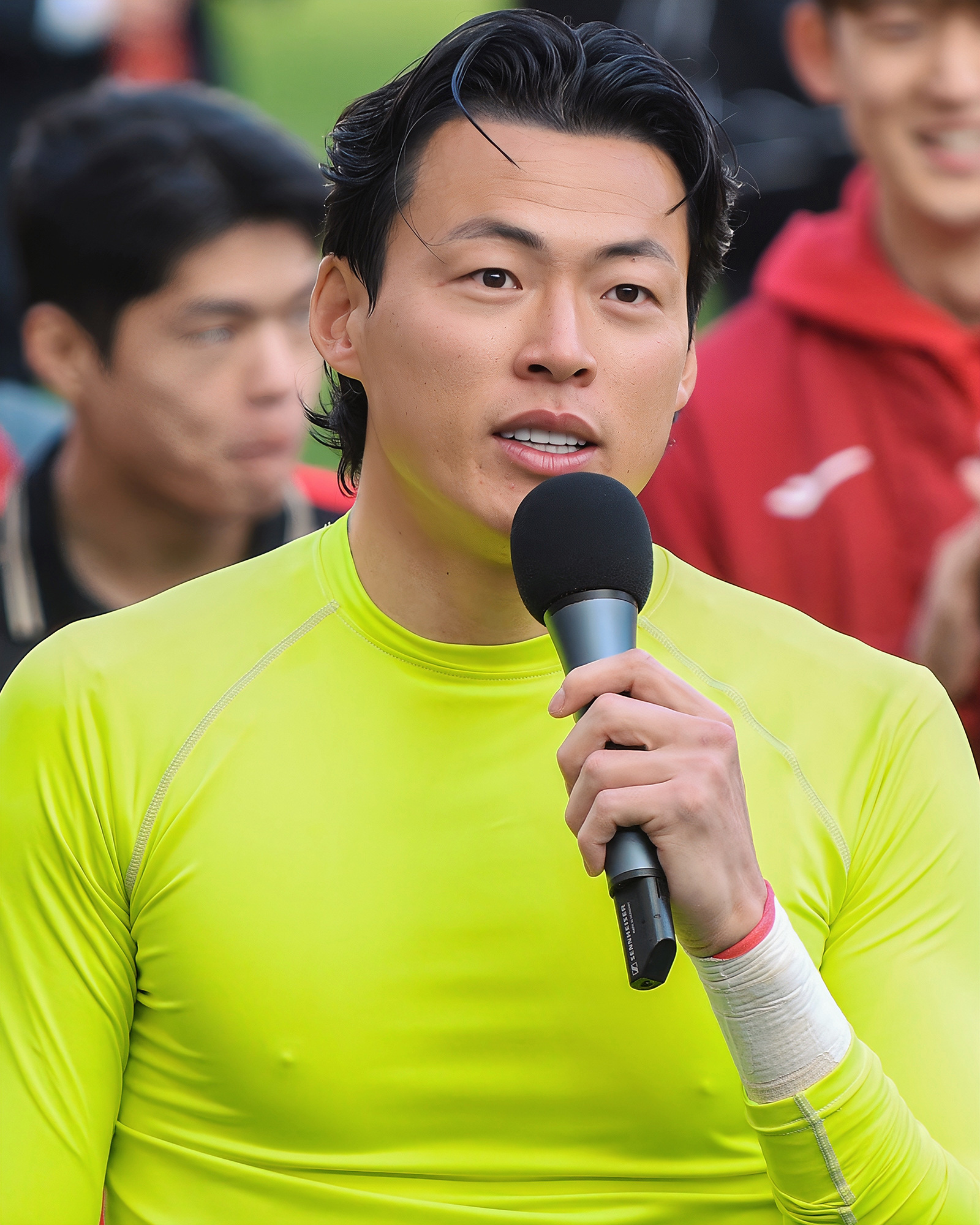
- Gu in 2026

Personal information
- Full name: Gu Sung-yun
- Date of birth: 27 June 1994 (age 32)
- Place of birth: Pohang, South Korea
- Height: 1.97 m (6 ft 6 in)
- Position: Goalkeeper

Team information
- Current team: FC Seoul
- Number: 25

Youth career
- 2007–2009: Jaehyun Middle School
- 2010–2012: Jaehyun High School
- 2012: Cerezo Osaka

Senior career*
Years	Team	Apps	(Gls)
2013–2014	Cerezo Osaka	0	(0)
2015–2020	Hokkaido Consadole Sapporo	167	(0)
2020–2022	Daegu FC	17	(0)
2021–2022	→ Gimcheon Sangmu (draft)	33	(0)
2023	Hokkaido Consadole Sapporo	8	(0)
2023	→ Kyoto Sanga (loan)	8	(0)
2024–2025	Kyoto Sanga	34	(0)
2025	Seoul E-Land	19	(0)
2026–	FC Seoul	35	(0)

International career^{‡}
2014–2016	South Korea U-23	15	(0)
2015–	South Korea	5	(0)
- * Club domestic league appearances and goals as of 8 November 2026 ‡ National team caps and goals as of 6 October 2026

- Gu Sung-yun
- Hangul: 구성윤
- Hanja: 具聖潤
- RR: Gu Seongyun
- MR: Ku Sŏngyun

Gu Sung-yun (Korean: 구성윤, born 27 June 1994) is a South Korean professional footballer who plays as a goalkeeper for K League 1 club FC Seoul and the South Korea national team.

== Club career ==
On 29 May 2020, Gu signed for K League 1 club Daegu. In an interview he expressed that he was happy signing for Daegu.

On 25 September 2022, it was announced that Gu would return to Hokkaido Consadole Sapporo for the 2023 J1 League season.

On 25 July 2023, Consadole loaned Gu Sung-yun to Kyoto Sanga until the end of the season.

== International career ==
Gu was part of the senior South Korea squad for the 2015 EAFF East Asian Cup.

== Club statistics ==
=== Club ===
As of match played 8 November 2026

Appearances and goals by club, season and competition
Club	Season	League			National cup (Note: Includes Emperor's Cup, Korea Cup)		League cup (Note: Includes J.League Cup)		Continental		Other		Total	
Club	Season	Division	Apps	Goals	Apps	Goals	Apps	Goals	Apps	Goals	Apps	Goals	Apps	Goals
Hokkaido Consadole Sapporo	2015	J2 League	33	0	1	0	0	0	—		—		34	0
Hokkaido Consadole Sapporo	2016	J2 League	33	0	0	0	0	0	—		—		33	0
Hokkaido Consadole Sapporo	2017	J1 League	33	0	0	0	3	0	—		—		36	0
Hokkaido Consadole Sapporo	2018	J1 League	34	0	2	0	0	0	—		—		36	0
Hokkaido Consadole Sapporo	2019	J1 League	33	0	0	0	1	0	—		—		34	0
Hokkaido Consadole Sapporo	2020	J1 League	1	0	0	0	1	0	—		—		2	0
Hokkaido Consadole Sapporo	Total		167	0	3	0	5	0	—		—		175	0
Daegu FC	2020	K League 1	17	0	2	0	—		—		—		19	0
Gimcheon Sangmu (draft)	2021	K League 2	18	0	0	0	—		—		—		18	0
Gimcheon Sangmu (draft)	2022	K League 1	15	0	0	0	—		—		—		15	0
Gimcheon Sangmu (draft)	Total		33	0	0	0	—		—		—		33	0
Hokkaido Consadole Sapporo	2023	J1 League	8	0	1	0	3	0	—		—		12	0
Kyoto Sanga (loan)	2023	J1 League	8	0	0	0	0	0	—		—		8	0
Kyoto Sanga	2024	J1 League	32	0	2	0	0	0	—		—		34	0
Kyoto Sanga	2025	J1 League	2	0	0	0	1	0	—		—		3	0
Kyoto Sanga	Total		34	0	2	0	1	0	—		—		37	0
Seoul E-Land	2025	K League 2	19	0	0	0	—		—		1 (Note: Appearances in K League 2 promotion playoffs)	0	20	0
FC Seoul	2026	K League 1	35	0	0	0	—		4 (Note: Appearances in AFC Champions League Elite)	0	—		39	0
Career total			321	0	8	0	9	0	4	0	1	0	343	0

=== International ===
As of match played 6 October 2026

Appearances and goals by national team and year
National team	Year	Apps	Goals
South Korea
South Korea	2019	2	0
South Korea	2020	2	0
South Korea	2021	0	0
South Korea	2022	0	0
South Korea	2026	1	0
Total		5	0

== Honours ==
Hokkaido Consadole Sapporo

- J.League Division 2: 2016

FC Seoul

- K League 1: 2026

South Korea U23

- King's Cup: 2015

South Korea

- EAFF E-1 Football Championship: 2019
