= Hiroki Miyazawa =

Japanese footballer

Hiroki Miyazawa 宮澤 裕樹
Personal information
- Full name: Hiroki Miyazawa
- Date of birth: 28 June 1989 (age 37)
- Place of birth: Date, Hokkaidō, Japan
- Height: 1.82 m (6 ft 0 in)
- Positions: Defensive midfielder; centre back

Team information
- Current team: Hokkaido Consadole Sapporo
- Number: 10

Youth career
- Osawa SSS
- Muroran Osawa FC
- 2005–2007: Muroran Otani High School

Senior career*
Years	Team	Apps	(Gls)
2008–	Hokkaido Consadole Sapporo	517	(31)

International career^{‡}
2008	Japan U-20	8	(1)
Medal record
Hokkaido Consadole Sapporo
Winner	J2 League	2016
Runner-up	J.League Cup	2019
- * Club domestic league appearances and goals as of 13 August 2026 ‡ National team caps and goals as of 8 November 2008, 18:22 (UTC)

Hiroki Miyazawa (宮澤 裕樹, Miyazawa Hiroki; born June 28, 1989 in Date, Hokkaidō) is a Japanese football player currently playing for Hokkaido Consadole Sapporo.

== Career statistics ==
=== Club ===
Updated to the end of 2024 season.

Club performance			League		Cup		League Cup		Total	
Season	Club	League	Apps	Goals	Apps	Goals	Apps	Goals	Apps	Goals
Japan			League		Emperor's Cup		League Cup		Total	
2008	Hokkaido Consadole Sapporo	J1 League	6	1	0	0	2	0	8	1
2009	Hokkaido Consadole Sapporo	J2 League	43	5	2	0	–		45	5
2010	Hokkaido Consadole Sapporo	J2 League	28	2	2	0	–		30	2
2011	Hokkaido Consadole Sapporo	J2 League	34	4	0	0	–		34	4
2012	Hokkaido Consadole Sapporo	J1 League	23	0	1	0	3	0	27	0
2013	Hokkaido Consadole Sapporo	J2 League	33	2	1	0	–		34	2
2014	Hokkaido Consadole Sapporo	J2 League	41	1	0	0	–		41	1
2015	Hokkaido Consadole Sapporo	J2 League	39	5	1	0	–		40	5
2016	Hokkaido Consadole Sapporo	J2 League	31	1	1	0	–		32	1
2017	Hokkaido Consadole Sapporo	J1 League	30	2	0	0	3	0	33	2
2018	Hokkaido Consadole Sapporo	J1 League	28	1	2	0	0	0	30	1
2019	Hokkaido Consadole Sapporo	J1 League	30	1	1	0	7	0	38	1
2020	Hokkaido Consadole Sapporo	J1 League	32	1	–		2	0	34	1
2021	Hokkaido Consadole Sapporo	J1 League	29	0	–		5	0	34	0
2022	Hokkaido Consadole Sapporo	J1 League	25	3	1	0	3	0	29	3
2023	Hokkaido Consadole Sapporo	J1 League	27	0	2	0	3	0	32	0
2024	Hokkaido Consadole Sapporo	J1 League	21	1	1	0	1	0	23	1
Career total			500	30	15	0	29	0	544	30

== National team career statistics ==
=== Appearances in major competitions ===
Team	Competition	Category	Appearances		Goals	Team record
Team	Competition	Category	Start	Sub	Goals	Team record
Japan	AFC Youth Championship 2008 qualification	U-18	1	3	0	Qualified
Japan	AFC U-19 Championship 2008	U-19	3	1	1	Quarterfinal
