= 2018 J1 League =

26th season of J1 League

Meiji Yasuda J1 League
- Season: 2018
- Dates: 23 February – 1 December
- Champions: Kawasaki Frontale (2nd title)
- Relegated: Kashiwa Reysol; V-Varen Nagasaki
- AFC Champions League: Kawasaki Frontale; Sanfrecce Hiroshima; Kashima Antlers; Urawa Red Diamonds
- Matches: 306
- Goals: 813 (2.66 per match)
- Top goalscorer: Jô (Nagoya Grampus) (24 goals)
- Biggest home win: Frontale v Consadole 7–0 (15 September)
- Biggest away win: Vegalta v Marinos 2–8 (16 July)
- Highest scoring: Vegalta v Marinos 2–8 (16 July)
- Longest winning run: 9 – Gamba Osaka (Matchday 25–33)
- Longest unbeaten run: 12 – Consadole Sapporo (Matchday 25–34)
- Longest winless run: 15 – Nagoya Grampus (Matchday 3–17)
- Longest losing run: 8 – Nagoya Grampus (Matchday 4–11)
- Highest attendance: 55,689 – Reds v Vissel (23 September, Matchday 27)
- Lowest attendance: 6,189 – S-Pulse v V-Varen (11 April, Matchday 7)
- Total attendance: 5,833,538
- Average attendance: 19,064

The 2018 J1 League, also known as the 2018 Meiji Yasuda J1 League (2018 明治安田生命J1リーグ, 2018 Meiji Yasuda Seimei J1 Rīgu) for sponsorship reasons, was the 26th season of J1 League, the top Japanese professional league for association football clubs, since its establishment in 1992. This was fourth season of J1 League as renamed from J. League Division 1.

Kawasaki Frontale were the defending champions.

== Clubs ==
A total of 18 clubs contested the league. The 2017 J2 League champion Shonan Bellmare and the winner of the promotion play-offs Nagoya Grampus returned to the top flight a year after being relegated from J1 in the 2016 season. V-Varen Nagasaki, J2 runner-up in 2017, played in the J1 League for the first time.

Club	Location	Stadium	Last season
Hokkaido Consadole Sapporo	Hokkaido	Sapporo Dome	J1 (11th)
Vegalta Sendai	Miyagi Prefecture	Yurtec Stadium Sendai	J1 (12th)
Kashima Antlers	Ibaraki Prefecture	Kashima Soccer Stadium	J1 (2nd)
Urawa Red Diamonds	Saitama Prefecture	Saitama Stadium 2002	J1 (7th)
Kashiwa Reysol	Chiba Prefecture	Sankyo Frontier Kashiwa Stadium	J1 (4th)
FC Tokyo	Tokyo	Ajinomoto Stadium	J1 (13th)
Kawasaki Frontale	Kanagawa Prefecture	Todoroki Athletics Stadium	J1 (champions)
Yokohama F. Marinos	Kanagawa Prefecture	Nissan Stadium; Nippatsu Mitsuzawa Stadium	J1 (5th)
Shonan Bellmare	Kanagawa Prefecture	Shonan BMW Stadium Hiratsuka	J2 (champions)
Shimizu S-Pulse	Shizuoka Prefecture	IAI Stadium Nihondaira	J1 (14th)
Júbilo Iwata	Shizuoka Prefecture	Yamaha Stadium	J1 (6th)
Nagoya Grampus	Aichi Prefecture	Paloma Mizuho Stadium; Toyota Stadium	J2 (3rd)
Gamba Osaka	Osaka Prefecture	Panasonic Stadium Suita	J1 (10th)
Cerezo Osaka	Osaka Prefecture	Yanmar Stadium; Kincho Stadium	J1 (3rd)
Vissel Kobe	Hyōgo Prefecture	Noevir Stadium Kobe	J1 (9th)
Sanfrecce Hiroshima	Hiroshima Prefecture	Edition Stadium Hiroshima	J1 (15th)
Sagan Tosu	Saga Prefecture	Best Amenity Stadium	J1 (8th)
V-Varen Nagasaki	Nagasaki Prefecture	Transcosmos Stadium Nagasaki	J2 (2nd)

=== Personnel and kits ===
Club	Manager	Captain	Kit manufacturer	Front shirt sponsor
Cerezo Osaka	(South Korea) Yoon Jong-hwan	(Japan) Hotaru Yamaguchi	Puma	Yanmar
FC Tokyo	(Japan) Kenta Hasegawa	(South Korea) Jang Hyun-soo	Umbro	Lifeval
Gamba Osaka	(Japan) Tsuneyasu Miyamoto	(Japan) Yasuhito Endō	Umbro	Panasonic
Hokkaido Consadole Sapporo	(Serbia) Mihailo Petrović	(Japan) Hiroki Miyazawa	Kappa	Shiroi Koibito
Júbilo Iwata	(Japan) Hiroshi Nanami	(Japan) Nagisa Sakurauchi	Puma	Yamaha
Kashima Antlers	(Japan) Go Oiwa	(Japan) Mitsuo Ogasawara	Nike	Lixil
Kashiwa Reysol	(Japan) Nozomu Kato	(Japan) Hidekazu Otani	Yonex	Hitachi
Kawasaki Frontale	(Japan) Toru Oniki	(Japan) Yu Kobayashi	Puma	Fujitsu
Nagoya Grampus	(Japan) Yahiro Kazama	(Japan) Hisato Satō	Mizuno	Toyota
Sagan Tosu	(South Korea) Kim Myung-hwi	(Japan) Yutaka Yoshida	New Balance	DHC
Sanfrecce Hiroshima	(Japan) Hiroshi Jofuku	(Japan) Toshihiro Aoyama	Nike	EDION
Shimizu S-Pulse	(Sweden) Jan Jönsson	(Japan) Ryo Takeuchi	Puma	Suzuyo
Shonan Bellmare	(South Korea) Cho Kwi-jae	(Japan) Kaoru Takayama	Penalty	Meldia
Urawa Red Diamonds	(Brazil) Oswaldo de Oliveira	(Japan) Yōsuke Kashiwagi	Nike	Polus
Vegalta Sendai	(Japan) Susumu Watanabe	(Japan) Shingo Tomita	Adidas	Iris Ohyama
Vissel Kobe	(Spain) Juan Manuel Lillo	(Germany) Lukas Podolski	Asics	Rakuten
V-Varen Nagasaki	(Japan) Takuya Takagi	(Netherlands) Jordy Buijs	Hummel	Japanet
Yokohama F. Marinos	(Australia) Ange Postecoglou	(Japan) Yuji Nakazawa	Adidas	Nissan

=== Managerial changes ===
Team	Outgoing manager	Date of vacancy	Incoming manager	Date of appointment
Yokohama F. Marinos	(France) Erick Mombaerts	1 January 2018	(Australia) Ange Postecoglou	19 December 2017
Urawa Red Diamonds	(Japan) Takafumi Hori	2 April 2018	(Brazil) Oswaldo de Oliveira	19 April 2018
Kashiwa Reysol	(Japan) Takahiro Shimotaira	13 May 2018	(Japan) Nozomu Kato	13 May 2018
Gamba Osaka	(Brazil) Levir Culpi	23 July 2018	(Japan) Tsuneyasu Miyamoto	23 July 2018
Vissel Kobe	(Japan) Takayuki Yoshida	17 Sep 2018	(Spain) Juan Manuel Lillo	4 Oct 2018
Sagan Tosu	(Italy) Massimo Ficcadenti	17 Oct 2018	(South Korea) Kim Myung-hwi	17 Oct 2018

=== Foreign players ===
The total number of foreign players is restricted to five per club. Clubs can register up to four foreign players for a single match-day squad, of which a maximum of three are allowed from nations outside the Asian Football Confederation (AFC). Players from J.League partner nations (Thailand, Vietnam, Myanmar, Cambodia, Singapore, Indonesia, Malaysia, Iran and Qatar) are exempt from these restrictions.

Players marked in bold indicate players that were registered during the mid-season transfer window. Players marked in ITALICS indicate players that were out of squad or left their respective clubs during the mid-season transfer window.

Club	Player 1	Player 2	Player 3	Player 4	Player 5	Other	Former players
Cerezo Osaka	(Brazil) Souza	(Croatia) Matej Jonjić	(South Korea) Kim Jin-hyeon	(South Korea) Yang Dong-hyun	(Spain) Osmar	(Australia) **Pierce Waring** (Thailand) Chaowat Veerachat	
FC Tokyo	(Brazil) Diego Oliveira	(Brazil) **Lins**	(Brazil) Lipe Veloso	(South Korea) Jang Hyun-soo		(Thailand) Jakkit Wachpirom	
Gamba Osaka	(Brazil) Ademilson	(Brazil) Fábio	(South Korea) Hwang Ui-jo	(South Korea) Oh Jae-suk			(Brazil) Matheus Jesus
Hokkaido Consadole Sapporo	(England) Jay Bothroyd	(South Korea) Gu Sung-yun	(South Korea) Kim Min-tae			(Thailand) Chanathip Songkrasin	(Brazil) Jonathan Reis (Brazil) Julinho
Júbilo Iwata	(Brazil) Adaílton	(Poland) Krzysztof Kamiński	(Turkey) **Eren Albayrak**	(Uzbekistan) Fozil Musaev			(Brazil) Gabriel Morbeck (Brazil) Guilherme
Kashima Antlers	(Brazil) Leandro	(Brazil) Léo Silva	(Brazil) **Serginho**	(South Korea) **Jung Seung-hyun**	(South Korea) Kwoun Sun-tae		(Brazil) Pedro Júnior
Kashiwa Reysol	(Brazil) Cristiano	(Brazil) **Nathan**	(Kenya) **Michael Olunga**	(South Korea) Kim Bo-kyung	(South Korea) Park Jeong-su		(Brazil) Ramon Lopes (South Korea) Yun Suk-young
Kawasaki Frontale	(Brazil) **Caio César**	(Brazil) Eduardo	(Brazil) Elsinho	(South Korea) Jung Sung-ryong		(Philippines) Jefferson Tabinas	(Brazil) Eduardo Neto
Nagoya Grampus	(Australia) Mitchell Langerak	(Brazil) **Eduardo Neto**	(Brazil) Gabriel Xavier	(Brazil) Jô	(Brazil) Willian Rocha		(Brazil) Washington
Sagan Tosu	(Lebanon) **Joan Oumari**	(South Korea) Cho Dong-geon	(South Korea) Kim Min-hyeok	(Spain) **Fernando Torres**			(Colombia) Víctor Ibarbo (South Korea) An Yong-woo (South Korea) Jung Seung-hyun
Sanfrecce Hiroshima	(Kosovo) **Besart Berisha**	(Brazil) Felipe	(Brazil) Patric			(Thailand) Teerasil Dangda	
Shimizu S-Pulse	(Australia) Mitch Duke	(Brazil) Crislan	(Brazil) **Douglas**	(Brazil) Freire	(South Korea) Hwang Seok-ho	(North Korea) Jong Tae-se	(China) Wu Shaocong
Shonan Bellmare	(Brazil) André Bahia	(Croatia) Mihael Mikić	(South Korea) Lee Jeong-hyeop				(Serbia) Alen Stevanović
Urawa Red Diamonds	(Australia) Andrew Nabbout	(Brazil) **Fabrício**	(Brazil) Maurício Antônio	(Curaçao) Quenten Martinus	(Slovenia) Zlatan Ljubijankič		
Vegalta Sendai	(Brazil) Rafaelson	**(Brazil) Ramon Lopes**	(South Korea) Lee Yun-oh			(North Korea) Ryang Yong-gi (South Korea) Kim Jung-ya	
Vissel Kobe	(Brazil) Wellington	(Germany) Lukas Podolski	(South Korea) Kim Seung-gyu	(Spain) **Andrés Iniesta**		(Qatar) **Ahmed Yasser** (Thailand) Theerathon Bunmathan	(Brazil) Leandro (South Korea) Jung Woo-young
V-Varen Nagasaki	(Netherlands) **Jordy Buijs**	(South Korea) Choi Kyu-baek	(Spain) **Jairo Morillas**	(Spain) Juanma			(Australia) Ben Halloran
Yokohama F. Marinos	(Brazil) **Thiago Martins**	(Cameroon) Olivier Boumal	(Portugal) Hugo Vieira	(Serbia) **Dušan Cvetinović**	(South Korea) Yun Il-lok	(Russia) Ippey Shinozuka	(Australia) Milos Degenek (North Macedonia) David Babunski

== Results ==
=== League table ===
Pos	Team	Pld	W	D	L	GF	GA	GD	Pts	Qualification or relegation
1	Kawasaki Frontale (C)	34	21	6	7	57	27	+30	69	Qualification for the Champions League group stage
2	Sanfrecce Hiroshima	34	17	6	11	47	35	+12	57	Qualification for the Champions League play-off round
3	Kashima Antlers	34	16	8	10	50	39	+11	56	Qualification for the Champions League play-off round
4	Hokkaido Consadole Sapporo	34	15	10	9	48	48	0	55	
5	Urawa Red Diamonds	34	14	9	11	51	39	+12	51	Qualification for the Champions League group stage (Note: Urawa Red Diamonds qualified for the 2019 AFC Champions League group stage as 2018 Emperor's Cup winners.)
6	FC Tokyo	34	14	8	12	39	34	+5	50	
7	Cerezo Osaka	34	13	11	10	39	38	+1	50	
8	Shimizu S-Pulse	34	14	7	13	56	48	+8	49	
9	Gamba Osaka	34	14	6	14	41	46	−5	48	
10	Vissel Kobe	34	12	9	13	45	52	−7	45	
11	Vegalta Sendai	34	13	6	15	44	54	−10	45	
12	Yokohama F. Marinos	34	12	5	17	56	56	0	41	
13	Shonan Bellmare	34	10	11	13	38	43	−5	41	
14	Sagan Tosu	34	10	11	13	29	34	−5	41	
15	Nagoya Grampus	34	12	5	17	52	59	−7	41	
16	Júbilo Iwata (O)	34	10	11	13	35	48	−13	41	Qualification for the Relegation play-off
17	Kashiwa Reysol (R)	34	12	3	19	47	54	−7	39	Relegation to J2 League
18	V-Varen Nagasaki (R)	34	8	6	20	39	59	−20	30	Relegation to J2 League

Source: Meiji Yasuda J1 League
Rules for classification: 1) Points; 2) Goal difference; 3) Goals scored
(C) Champions; (O) Play-off winners; (R) Relegated

=== Positions by round ===
Team ╲ Round	1	2	3	4	5	6	7	8	9	10	11	12	13	14	15	16	17	18	19	20	21	22	23	24	25	26	27	28	29	30	31	32	33	34
Kawasaki Frontale	1	4	2	1	3	2	5	6	3	3	3	4	5	4	3	3	3	3	3	3	3	2	2	2	2	2	2	1	1	1	1	1	1	1
Sanfrecce Hiroshima	4	2	1	2	1	1	1	1	1	1	1	1	1	1	1	1	1	1	1	1	1	1	1	1	1	1	1	2	2	2	2	2	2	2
Kashima Antlers	12	7	9	6	8	12	13	8	12	14	15	13	8	10	11	13	10	7	9	6	7	7	7	7	8	7	4	3	3	5	5	3	3	3
Hokkaido Consadole Sapporo	16	11	15	11	15	7	6	4	4	4	4	3	3	3	5	5	5	6	4	4	5	6	6	4	4	5	7	4	5	3	3	4	4	4
Urawa Red Diamonds	6	13	13	17	17	16	11	10	9	12	14	11	12	13	14	11	12	9	7	8	9	9	9	9	9	9	8	6	6	6	6	6	6	5
FC Tokyo	6	14	17	13	9	4	3	5	2	2	2	2	2	2	2	2	2	2	2	2	2	3	3	3	3	3	3	5	4	4	4	5	5	6
Cerezo Osaka	6	9	10	15	12	6	4	3	5	5	5	5	4	5	4	4	4	5	6	7	6	5	5	6	5	6	5	7	8	7	8	8	9	7
Shimizu S-Pulse	12	5	3	3	4	5	8	12	13	11	7	10	11	9	10	9	8	10	8	10	11	11	11	12	12	10	10	9	9	8	7	7	7	8
Gamba Osaka	14	17	18	18	18	18	18	18	17	17	16	15	16	16	16	16	16	16	16	17	17	18	17	17	17	17	17	13	12	10	9	9	8	9
Vissel Kobe	6	15	14	8	13	10	9	9	7	6	8	8	10	7	6	6	6	4	5	5	4	4	4	5	7	8	9	10	11	12	11	12	11	10
Vegalta Sendai	4	3	5	4	2	3	2	2	6	7	6	9	7	8	7	8	7	8	10	12	8	8	8	8	6	4	6	8	7	9	10	10	10	11
Yokohama F. Marinos	6	16	16	12	10	13	14	16	15	15	13	16	15	15	13	10	13	13	13	15	13	14	15	15	14	14	12	11	10	11	13	11	12	12
Shonan Bellmare	3	6	7	10	14	11	12	15	14	13	10	12	13	14	12	14	11	12	11	11	12	12	12	14	13	13	14	14	13	14	14	14	14	13
Sagan Tosu	6	10	6	9	6	9	9	14	16	16	17	17	17	17	17	17	17	17	17	16	15	15	16	16	16	15	15	16	17	16	15	15	15	14
Nagoya Grampus	2	1	4	5	7	15	16	17	18	18	18	18	18	18	18	18	18	18	18	18	18	16	14	13	11	12	13	15	16	15	16	16	16	15
Júbilo Iwata	18	18	11	13	10	14	15	11	8	10	9	6	6	6	8	7	9	11	12	9	10	10	10	10	10	11	11	12	15	13	12	13	13	16
Kashiwa Reysol	16	8	8	7	5	8	7	7	10	8	11	7	9	11	9	12	14	15	15	13	14	13	13	11	15	16	16	17	14	17	17	17	17	17
V-Varen Nagasaki	15	11	12	16	16	17	17	13	11	9	12	14	14	12	15	15	15	14	14	14	16	17	18	18	18	18	18	18	18	18	18	18	18	18

Leader and qualification to AFC Champions League Group stage
Qualification to AFC Champions League qualifying play-off
Qualification to Relegation play-off
Relegation to J2 League

Source: Meiji Yasuda J1 League

=== Results table ===
Home \ Away	ANT	BEL	CER	CON	FMA	FRO	GAM	GRA	JUB	RED	REY	SSP	SAG	SFR	TOK	VVN	VEG	VIS
Kashima Antlers	—	2–1	1–0	0–0	1–0	0–0	1–0	2–0	1–1	1–0	6–2	1–0	0–0	0–1	1–2	2–1	1–2	1–1
Shonan Bellmare	2–1	—	1–1	2–2	0–1	0–0	1–0	0–0	1–0	2–1	1–2	0–0	1–1	0–2	0–0	2–1	1–3	0–2
Cerezo Osaka	0–2	2–1	—	3–3	1–1	2–1	0–1	0–1	1–1	1–1	0–3	3–1	2–1	0–1	1–0	3–1	2–1	1–1
Hokkaido Consadole Sapporo	0–2	1–0	1–1	—	2–1	1–2	2–0	3–0	0–0	1–2	1–2	1–3	2–1	2–2	3–2	2–1	1–0	3–1
Yokohama F. Marinos	3–0	4–4	1–2	2–1	—	1–1	1–1	1–2	1–3	1–2	3–1	1–2	1–2	1–4	0–1	5–2	5–2	1–2
Kawasaki Frontale	4–1	1–1	1–2	7–0	2–0	—	2–0	3–1	2–1	0–2	3–0	3–0	0–0	0–1	0–2	1–0	1–0	5–3
Gamba Osaka	1–1	1–0	1–0	1–1	2–1	2–0	—	2–3	2–0	0–0	2–2	1–2	3–0	1–0	2–1	2–1	1–0	0–1
Nagoya Grampus	4–2	2–2	0–0	1–2	1–1	0–1	3–2	—	1–0	4–1	2–3	1–3	3–0	0–0	1–2	3–4	2–3	1–2
Júbilo Iwata	3–3	1–0	1–1	0–2	1–2	0–3	1–1	1–6	—	2–1	2–0	0–0	1–0	3–2	2–0	1–2	3–2	0–2
Urawa Red Diamonds	3–1	0–1	1–2	0–0	0–1	2–0	1–3	3–1	4–0	—	3–2	2–1	0–0	1–2	3–2	0–0	1–0	4–0
Kashiwa Reysol	2–3	0–2	1–1	1–2	2–0	1–2	4–2	0–1	1–2	1–0	—	2–3	1–1	0–1	0–1	5–1	0–2	2–1
Shimizu S-Pulse	0–0	4–2	3–0	1–2	0–1	1–2	1–2	2–0	5–1	3–3	2–1	—	1–0	2–0	0–1	0–1	1–1	3–3
Sagan Tosu	0–1	0–1	1–0	1–2	2–1	0–2	3–0	3–2	0–0	1–0	1–2	3–1	—	1–0	0–0	1–0	0–1	1–1
Sanfrecce Hiroshima	3–1	2–2	0–2	1–0	3–1	1–2	4–0	1–2	0–0	1–4	0–3	2–0	1–0	—	1–1	2–0	0–1	2–0
FC Tokyo	2–1	1–0	0–1	0–0	5–2	0–2	3–2	3–2	0–0	1–1	0–1	0–2	0–0	3–1	—	0–1	0–1	1–0
V-Varen Nagasaki	1–2	1–3	0–2	2–3	1–2	1–2	3–0	3–0	0–0	1–1	1–0	1–2	2–2	0–2	2–5	—	1–0	0–1
Vegalta Sendai	0–3	4–1	2–2	2–2	2–8	0–0	2–1	1–2	0–3	1–1	1–0	2–1	2–3	1–3	1–0	1–0	—	1–1
Vissel Kobe	0–5	0–3	2–0	4–0	0–2	1–2	1–2	3–0	2–1	2–3	1–0	2–4	0–0	1–1	0–0	1–1	3–2	—

Source: 2018 J1 League
Legend: Blue = home team win; Yellow = draw; Red = away team win.

== Promotion–Relegation Playoff ==
2018 J.League J1/J2 Play-Offs (2018 J1参入プレーオフ)

8 December 2018
14:00

Júbilo Iwata	2–0	Tokyo Verdy
Ogawa 41' (pen.); Taguchi 80'	Report

Yamaha Stadium, Iwata
Attendance: 14,588

Júbilo Iwata stays in J1 League and Tokyo Verdy remains in J2 League.

== Season statistics ==
=== Top scorers ===
As of matches played on 1 December 2018.

Rank	Player	Club	Goals
1	Jô	Nagoya Grampus	24
2	Patric	Sanfrecce Hiroshima	20
3	(South Korea) Hwang Ui-jo	Gamba Osaka	16
4	(Japan) Shinzo Koroki	Urawa Red Diamonds	15
4	(Japan) Yu Kobayashi	Kawasaki Frontale	15
6	Diego Oliveira	FC Tokyo	13
6	(Japan) Koya Kitagawa	Shimizu S-Pulse	13
6	(Portugal) Hugo Vieira	Yokohama F. Marinos	13
9	Ken Tokura	Hokkaido Consadole Sapporo	12
10	(Brazil) Douglas	Shimizu S-Pulse	11
10	(Japan) Kengo Kawamata	Júbilo Iwata	11
10	(Japan) Musashi Suzuki	V-Varen Nagasaki	11
10	(Japan) Takuma Nishimura	Vegalta Sendai	11
10	(Japan) Yuma Suzuki	Kashima Antlers	11

=== Top assists ===
Rank	Player	Club	Assists
1	(Japan) Yōsuke Kashiwagi	Urawa Red Diamonds	12
2	(Japan) Junya Ito	Kashiwa Reysol	11
3	(Japan) Kosei Shibasaki	Sanfrecce Hiroshima	9
3	(Japan) Yuma Suzuki	Kashima Antlers	9
4	(Brazil) Gabriel Xavier	Nagoya Grampus	8
4	(Japan) Hideki Ishige	Shimizu S-Pulse	8
4	(Japan) Koya Kitagawa	Shimizu S-Pulse	8
4	(Japan) Yuki Muto	Urawa Red Diamonds	8

=== Hat-tricks ===
Player	For	Against	Result	Date
(Brazil) Diego Oliveira	FC Tokyo	V-Varen Nagasaki	2–5 (A)	8 April 2018
(Portugal) Hugo Vieira	Yokohama F. Marinos	Shonan Bellmare	4–4 (H)	21 April 2018
(Japan) Sho Ito	Yokohama F. Marinos	Vegalta Sendai	2–8 (A)	18 July 2018
(Brazil) Jô	Nagoya Grampus	Gamba Osaka	4–1 (H)	5 August 2018
(Brazil) Fabrício	Urawa Red Diamonds	Júbilo Iwata	4–0 (H)	15 August 2018
(Brazil) Jô	Nagoya Grampus	Urawa Red Diamonds	4–1 (H)	26 August 2018
(Japan) Musashi Suzuki	V-Varen Nagasaki	Nagoya Grampus	4–3 (A)	15 September 2018

Note

(H) – Home; (A) – Away

== Attendances ==
Pos	Team	Total	High	Low	Average	Change
1	Urawa Red Diamonds	603,534	55,689	21,250	35,502	+5.8%
2	FC Tokyo	449,388	44,801	13,425	26,432	−0.2%
3	Nagoya Grampus	419,218	43,579	9,297	24,660	+60.5%^{†}
4	Gamba Osaka	399,242	35,242	11,824	23,485	−3.3%
5	Kawasaki Frontale	394,709	24,677	17,113	23,218	+5.0%
6	Yokohama F. Marinos	370,401	41,686	8,688	21,788	−9.9%
7	Vissel Kobe	367,716	26,603	9,015	21,630	+18.4%
8	Kashima Antlers	330,376	33,647	7,672	19,434	−5.0%
9	Cerezo Osaka	319,782	34,303	8,165	18,811	−10.3%
10	Hokkaido Consadole Sapporo	309,798	34,250	6,729	18,223	−1.1%
11	Júbilo Iwata	263,060	31,375	8,047	15,474	−5.2%
12	Vegalta Sendai	261,943	19,152	13,158	15,408	+4.5%
13	Sagan Tosu	255,004	22,669	7,138	15,000	+5.7%
14	Shimizu S-Pulse	254,844	20,109	6,193	14,991	−0.8%
15	Sanfrecce Hiroshima	243,874	21,997	7,344	14,346	+2.2%
16	Shonan Bellmare	206,039	15,351	8,002	12,120	+43.4%^{†}
17	Kashiwa Reysol	193,833	14,208	9,255	11,402	+6.3%
18	V-Varen Nagasaki	190,827	15,975	6,579	11,225	+88.9%^{†}
	League total	5,833,538	55,689	6,193	19,064	+1.0%

Updated to games played on 1 December 2018
Source: J. League Data
Notes:
^{†} Promoted from J2.

== Awards ==
2018 J.League Best XI

Award	Winner	Club
Manager of the Year	(Serbia) Mihailo Petrović	Hokkaido Consadole Sapporo
Most Valuable Player	(Japan) Akihiro Ienaga	Kawasaki Frontale
Rookie of the Year	(Japan) Hiroki Abe	Kashima Antlers

J.League Best XI
Goalkeeper	(South Korea) Jung Sung-ryong (Kawasaki Frontale)			
Defence	(Japan) Daigo Nishi (Kashima Antlers)	(Japan) Shintaro Kurumaya (Kawasaki Frontale)	(Japan) Shogo Taniguchi (Kawasaki Frontale)	(Brazil) Elsinho (Kawasaki Frontale)
Midfield	(Thailand) Chanathip Songkrasin (Hokkaido Consadole Sapporo)	(Japan) Ryota Oshima (Kawasaki Frontale)	(Japan) Kengo Nakamura (Kawasaki Frontale)	(Japan) Akihiro Ienaga (Kawasaki Frontale)
Attack	(South Korea) Hwang Ui-jo (Gamba Osaka)		(Brazil) Jô (Nagoya Grampus)	
