= 2023 Nagoya Grampus season =

Nagoya Grampus
2023 season
- Chairman: Toyo Kato
- Manager: Kenta Hasegawa
- J1 League: 6th
- Emperor's Cup: Quarterfinal vs Kashiwa Reysol
- J. League Cup: Semifinal vs Avispa Fukuoka
- Top goalscorer: League: Kasper Junker (16); All: Kasper Junker (17)
- Highest home attendance: 57,058 vs Albirex Niigata (5 August 2023)
- Lowest home attendance: 3,423 vs Vegalta Sendai (12 July 2023)
- Average home league attendance: 27,504 (3 December 2023)
Home colours	Away colours
- All statistics correct as of 3 December 2023.

The 2023 Nagoya Grampus season was Nagoya Grampus' 6th season back in the J1 League following their relegation at the end of the 2016 season, their 30th J1 League season and 40th overall in the Japanese top flight. Nagoya Grampus finished the season 6th in the J1 League, reached the Quarterfinal of the Emperor's Cup and Semifinal of the J. League Cup.

== Season events ==
On 5 January, Nagoya Grampus announced the singing of Kasper Junker on loan from Urawa Red Diamonds for the season.

On 13 March, Nagoya Grampus announced the signing of Daichi Sugimoto from Vegalta Sendai.

On 25 May, Nagoya Grampus announced that Shumpei Naruse's loan to Montedio Yamagata had been terminated and that he had joined Mito HollyHock on loan until 31 January 2024.

On 25 June, Nagoya Grampus announced the signing of Taika Nakashima on loan for the remainder of the season from Hokkaido Consadole Sapporo.

On 26 July, Nagoya Grampus announced the signing of Tojiro Kubo from Fujieda MYFC.

On 1 August, Nagoya Grampus announced an agreement with Saudi Pro League club Al Taawoun, for the transfer of Mateus Castro.

On 3 August, Nagoya Grampus announced the signing of Tsukasa Morishima from Sanfrecce Hiroshima.

== Squad ==
As of match played 3 December 2023

No.	Name	Nationality	Position	Date of birth (age)	Signed from	Signed in	Contract ends	Apps.	Goals
Goalkeepers
1	Mitchell Langerak	(Australia)	GK	22 August 1988 (aged 35)	Levante	2018		245	0
16	Yohei Takeda	(Japan)	GK	30 June 1987 (aged 36)	Oita Trinita	2016		51	0
23	Daiki Mitsui	(Japan)	GK	27 May 2001 (aged 22)	Academy	2020		0	0
37	Daichi Sugimoto	(Japan)	GK	15 July 1993 (aged 30)	Vegalta Sendai	2023		0	0
Defenders
2	Yuki Nogami	(Japan)	DF	20 April 1991 (aged 32)	Sanfrecce Hiroshima	2023		41	2
3	Yuichi Maruyama	(Japan)	DF	16 June 1989 (aged 34)	FC Tokyo	2018		160	4
4	Shinnosuke Nakatani	(Japan)	DF	24 March 1996 (aged 27)	Kashiwa Reysol	2018		235	8
13	Haruya Fujii	(Japan)	DF	26 December 2000 (aged 22)	Academy	2018		110	5
17	Ryoya Morishita	(Japan)	DF	11 April 1997 (aged 26)	Sagan Tosu	2021		122	7
24	Akinari Kawazura	(Japan)	DF	3 May 1994 (aged 29)	Omiya Ardija	2022		29	0
30	Ei Gyotoku	(Japan)	DF	17 December 2004 (aged 18)	Shizuoka Gakuen HS	2023		1	0
38	Soma Ota	(Japan)	DF	1 July 2005 (aged 18)	Academy	2022		0	0
44	Ryuhei Osada	(Japan)	DF	7 September 2005 (aged 18)	Academy	2023		1	0
49	Shoma Ota	(Japan)	DF	1 July 2005 (aged 18)	Academy	2023		1	0
Midfielders
6	Takuji Yonemoto	(Japan)	MF	3 December 1990 (aged 33)	Tokyo	2019		130	1
7	Ryuji Izumi	(Japan)	MF	6 November 1993 (aged 30)	Kashima Antlers	2023		173	15
9	Noriyoshi Sakai	(Japan)	MF	9 November 1992 (aged 31)	Sagan Tosu	2022		51	7
14	Tsukasa Morishima	(Japan)	MF	25 April 1997 (aged 26)	Sanfrecce Hiroshima	2023		16	0
15	Sho Inagaki	(Japan)	MF	25 December 1991 (aged 31)	Sanfrecce Hiroshima	2020		181	21
19	Takuya Shigehiro	(Japan)	MF	5 May 1995 (aged 28)	Avispa Fukuoka	2022		18	1
20	Tojiro Kubo	(Japan)	MF	5 April 1999 (aged 24)	Fujieda MYFC	2023		12	2
21	Thales Paula	(Brazil)	MF	29 June 2001 (aged 22)	Roasso Kumamoto	2022		13	0
25	Naoki Maeda	(Japan)	MF	17 November 1995 (aged 28)	Matsumoto Yamaga	2018		157	28
31	Haruki Yoshida	(Japan)	MF	29 April 2003 (aged 20)	Academy	2022		14	2
33	Hidemasa Koda	(Japan)	MF	2 October 2003 (aged 20)	Academy	2022		19	0
34	Takuya Uchida	(Japan)	MF	2 June 1998 (aged 25)	on loan from FC Tokyo	2022	2023	61	0
35	Riku Yamada	(Japan)	MF	15 April 1998 (aged 25)	Ventforet Kofu	2023		13	0
43	Haruto Suzuki	(Japan)	MF	17 May 2005 (aged 18)	Academy	2022		1	0
45	Ken Masui ^{DSP}	(Japan)	MF	4 April 2001 (aged 22)	on loan from Kwansei Gakuin University	2023		2	0
46	Ryotaro Ishida	(Japan)	MF	13 December 2001 (aged 21)	Academy	2018		37	2
50	Kosuke Uchida	(Japan)	DF	25 July 2005 (aged 18)	Academy	2023		1	0
Forwards
18	Kensuke Nagai	(Japan)	FW	5 March 1989 (aged 34)	FC Tokyo	2022		260	69
27	Taika Nakashima	(Japan)	FW	8 June 2002 (aged 21)	Hokkaido Consadole Sapporo	2023	2023	15	1
42	Ryoga Kida	(Japan)	FW	15 July 2005 (aged 18)	Academy	2022		21	3
47	Kyota Sakakibara ^{DSP}	(Japan)	FW	20 October 2001 (aged 22)	on loan from Rissho University	2023		1	0
77	Kasper Junker	(Denmark)	FW	5 March 1994 (aged 29)	on loan from Urawa Red Diamonds	2023	2023	42	17
Away on loan
32	Koki Toyoda	(Japan)	FW	11 April 2003 (aged 20)	Academy	2022		4	0
	Shumpei Naruse	(Japan)	DF	17 January 2001 (aged 22)	Academy	2018		63	0
	Yuki Soma	(Japan)	MF	25 February 1997 (aged 26)	Academy	2018		160	13
Left during the season
5	Kazuki Nagasawa	(Japan)	MF	16 December 1991 (aged 31)	Urawa Red Diamonds	2021		71	1
10	Mateus	(Brazil)	MF	11 September 1994 (aged 29)	Omiya Ardija	2019		173	48
92	Leonardo	(Brazil)	FW	22 October 1992 (aged 31)	Chongqing Liangjiang Athletic	2022		16	0

== Transfers ==
=== In ===
Date	Position	Nationality	Name	From	Fee	Ref.
9 January 2023	DF	(Japan)	Yuki Nogami	Sanfrecce Hiroshima	Undisclosed	
9 January 2023	MF	(Japan)	Ryuji Izumi	Kashima Antlers	Undisclosed	
9 January 2023	MF	(Japan)	Riku Yamada	Ventforet Kofu	Undisclosed	
13 March 2023	GK	(Japan)	Daichi Sugimoto	Vegalta Sendai	Undisclosed	
26 July 2023	MF	(Japan)	Tojiro Kubo	Fujieda MYFC	Undisclosed	
3 August 2023	MF	(Japan)	Tsukasa Morishima	Sanfrecce Hiroshima	Undisclosed	

=== Loans in ===
Date from	Position	Nationality	Name	From	Date to	Ref.
5 January 2023	FW	(Denmark)	Kasper Junker	Urawa Red Diamonds	End of season	
25 June 2023	FW	(Japan)	Taika Nakashima	Hokkaido Consadole Sapporo	End of season	

=== Out ===
Date	Position	Nationality	Name	To	Fee	Ref.
6 January 2023	FW	(Japan)	Yoichiro Kakitani	Tokushima Vortis	Undisclosed	
1 August 2023	MF	(Brazil)	Mateus Castro	Al Taawoun	Undisclosed	
3 August 2023	MF	(Japan)	Kazuki Nagasawa	Vegalta Sendai	Undisclosed	
7 August 2023	FW	(Brazil)	Leonardo	Fujieda MYFC	Undisclosed	

=== Loans out ===
Date from	Position	Nationality	Name	To	Date to	Ref.
30 January 2023	MF	(Japan)	Yuki Soma	Casa Pia	30 June 2023	
1 February 2023	DF	(Japan)	Shumpei Naruse	Montedio Yamagata	25 May 2023	
25 May 2023	DF	(Japan)	Shumpei Naruse	Mito HollyHock	31 January 2024	
7 August 2023	FW	(Japan)	Koki Toyoda	Nagano Parceiro	31 January 2024	

=== Released ===
Date	Position	Nationality	Name	Joined	Date	Ref.
10 February 2023	FW	(Poland)	Jakub Świerczok	Zagłębie Lubin	10 February 2023	

== Competitions ==
=== Overview ===
Competition	First match	Last match	Starting round	Final position	Record							
Competition	First match	Last match	Starting round	Final position	Pld	W	D	L	GF	GA	GD	Win %
J1 League	18 February 2023	3 December 2023	Matchday 1	6th	34	14	10	10	41	36	+5	41.18
Emperor's Cup	7 June 2023	30 August 2023	Second Round	Quarterfinal	4	2	1	1	7	5	+2	50.00
J.League Cup	8 March 2023	15 October 2023	Group Stage	Semifinal	10	6	2	2	14	9	+5	60.00
Total					48	22	13	13	62	50	+12	45.83

Last updated: 3 December 2023
Source: Competitions

=== J1 League ===
==== League table ====
Pos	Team	Pld	W	D	L	GF	GA	GD	Pts	Qualification or relegation
4	Urawa Red Diamonds	34	15	12	7	42	27	+15	57	
5	Kashima Antlers	34	14	10	10	43	34	+9	52	
6	Nagoya Grampus	34	14	10	10	41	36	+5	52	
7	Avispa Fukuoka	34	15	6	13	37	43	−6	51	
8	Kawasaki Frontale	34	14	8	12	51	45	+6	50	Qualification for the AFC Champions League Elite league stage (Note: Qualified as the 2023 Emperor's Cup winners.)

Source: Meiji Yasuda J1 League, J.League Data Site
Rules for classification: 1) Points; 2) Goal difference; 3) Goals scored; 4) Head-to-head points; 5) Head-to-head goal difference; 6) Head-to-head goals scored; 7) Fewer disciplinary points.

==== Results summary ====
Overall								Home						Away					
Pld	W	D	L	GF	GA	GD	Pts	W	D	L	GF	GA	GD	W	D	L	GF	GA	GD
34	14	10	10	40	35	+5	52	8	9	0	22	12	+10	6	1	10	18	23	−5

Last updated: 3 December 2023.
Source: see below

==== Results by round ====
Round	1	2	3	4	5	6	7	8	9	10	11	12	13	14	15	16	17	18	19	20	21	22	23	24	25	26	27	28	29	30	31	32	33	34
Ground	A	H	A	A	H	A	H	A	H	A	H	H	A	H	A	H	H	A	H	A	A	H	H	A	A	H	A	H	A	A	H	A	A	H
Result	W	W	L	W	D	W	D	W	D	D	D	W	L	W	W	W	W	L	W	D	L	W	W	L	L	D	L	D	L	W	D	L	L	D
Position	5	3	5	2	2	2	2	2	2	3	3	3	3	3	3	3	2	3	2	3	3	3	3	3	3	3	5	4	6	4	5	5	5	6

Updated to match(es) played on 3 December 2023. Source: See Below
A = Away; H = Home; W = Win; D = Draw; L = Loss

==== Matches ====
18 February 2023 1	Yokohama FC	0–1	Nagoya Grampus	Yokohama
14:03 JST (UTC+9)	Lara (yellow card) 22'; Caprini (yellow card) 73'; Nakamura (yellow card) 90+7'; Ko.Ogawa (yellow card) 90+8'	Report	Junker 4'; Morishita (yellow card) 66'	Stadium: NHK Spring Mitsuzawa Football Stadium; Attendance: 11,186; Referee: Akihiko Ikeuchi

25 February 2023 2	Nagoya Grampus	1–0	Kyoto Sanga	Toyota
16:03 JST (UTC+9)	Nagai 62'	Report	Tawiah (yellow card) 11'; Sato (yellow card) 51'; Paulinho (yellow card) 90+1'	Stadium: Toyota Stadium; Attendance: 21,327; Referee: Yoshiro Imamura

4 March 2023 3	Sagan Tosu	1–0	Nagoya Grampus	Tosu
15:04 JST (UTC+9)	Nishikawa (yellow card) 57'; Fukuta (yellow card) 63'; Naganuma 83'	Report	Yonemoto (yellow card) 90+5'	Stadium: Ekimae Real Estate Stadium; Attendance: 7,773; Referee: Koei Koya

12 March 2023 4	Kashiwa Reysol	0–3	Nagoya Grampus	Kashiwa
15:03 JST (UTC+9)	Shiihashi (yellow card) 39'; Kawaguchi (yellow card) 63'	Report	Nagai (yellow card) 33' (goal) 52'; Junker 41'; Tatsuta 70' (o.g.)	Stadium: Sankyo Frontier Kashiwa Stadium; Attendance: 9,866; Referee: Futoshi Nakamura

18 March 2023 5	Nagoya Grampus	0–0	FC Tokyo	Toyota
14:03 JST (UTC+9)	Inagaki (yellow card) 48'	Report	Koizumi (yellow card) 10'; Tsukagawa (yellow card) 50'; K.Higashi (yellow card) 67'	Stadium: Toyota Stadium; Attendance: 33,139; Referee: Jumpei Iida

1 April 2023 6	Albirex Niigata	1–3	Nagoya Grampus	Niigata
14:03 JST (UTC+9)	Hayakawa (yellow card) 18'; Ota 35'; Fitzgerald (red card) 36'	Report	Nagai 56'; Junker 80'; Fujii (yellow card) 89'; Ishida (yellow card) 90+1'; Inagaki 90+4'	Stadium: Denka Big Swan Stadium; Attendance: 18,428; Referee: Yoshiro Imamura

9 April 2023 7	Nagoya Grampus	0–0	Urawa Red Diamonds	Toyota
15:03 JST (UTC+9)		Report	Akimoto (yellow card) 18'; Ito (yellow card) 77'	Stadium: Toyota Stadium; Attendance: 22,655; Referee: Yuichi Nishimura

15 April 2023 8	Kawasaki Frontale	1–2	Nagoya Grampus	Kawasaki
15:00 JST (UTC+9)	Miyashiro 56'	Report	Junker 9'; Mateus 45+2'	Stadium: Kawasaki Todoroki Stadium; Attendance: 17,304; Referee: Koichiro Fukushima

23 April 2023 9	Nagoya Grampus	2–2	Shonan Bellmare	Toyota
15:00 JST (UTC+9)	Morishita 41'; Nakatani 50' (yellow card) 78'; T.Uchida (yellow card) 81'; Nagasawa (yellow card) 90'; Junker (yellow card) FT'	Report	Ishihara (yellow card) 14'; Hiraoka (yellow card) 39'; Yamada 56'; Machino 80' (pen.); Nagaki (yellow card) 90+2'	Stadium: Toyota Stadium; Attendance: 17,243; Referee: Takuto Okabe

29 April 2023 10	Yokohama F. Marinos	1–1	Nagoya Grampus	Yokohama
15:00 JST (UTC+9)	Kida 72' (yellow card) 90+1'	Report	Mateus (yellow card) 13'; Nogami (yellow card) 39'; Morishita 41'	Stadium: Nissan Stadium; Attendance: 33,048; Referee: Yoshimi Yamashita

3 May 2023 11	Nagoya Grampus	2–2	Vissel Kobe	Toyota
15:00 JST (UTC+9)	Mateus (yellow card) 49'; Junker 73'; Fujii 90+8'	Report	Osako 11'; Ide (yellow card) 51'; Saito (yellow card) 53' (yellow-red card) 90+6'; Sasaki 60'	Stadium: Toyota Stadium; Attendance: 40,789; Referee: Yusuke Araki

6 May 2023 12	Nagoya Grampus	1–0	Gamba Osaka	Toyota
19:03 JST (UTC+9)	Izumi (yellow card) 63'; Inagaki 67'	Report	Dawhan (yellow card) 33'; Juan Alano (yellow card) 39'; Ishige (yellow card) 56'; Usami (yellow card) 78'; Fukuoka (yellow card) 87'; Kurokawa (yellow card) 90+5'	Stadium: Toyota Stadium; Attendance: 28,613; Referee: Yudai Yamamoto

14 May 2023 13	Kashima Antlers	2–0	Nagoya Grampus	Kashima
13:30 JST (UTC+9)	Suzuki 29'; Doi (yellow card) 67'; Chinen 84'; Sano (yellow card) 88'; Pituca (yellow card) 90+2'	Report		Stadium: Kashima Soccer Stadium; Attendance: 56,020; Referee: Hiroyuki Kimura

20 May 2023 14	Nagoya Grampus	2–1	Sanfrecce Hiroshima	Toyota
15:00 JST (UTC+9)	Yonemoto (yellow card) 29'; Nakatani (yellow card) 35'; Junker 43', 48'; Morishita (yellow card) 77'	Report	Kawamura 37'; Araki (yellow card) 50'	Stadium: Toyota Stadium; Attendance: 15,506; Referee: Koei Koya

27 May 2023 15	Hokkaido Consadole Sapporo	1–2	Nagoya Grampus	Sapporo
13:00 JST (UTC+9)	Suga (yellow card) 43'; S.Tanaka (yellow card) 64'; Kaneko 85'	Report	Junker 1'; Morishita (yellow card) 40'; Mateus 55'; Nagai (yellow card) 62'; Yonemoto (yellow card) 65'; Langerak (yellow card) 90+6'	Stadium: Sapporo Dome; Attendance: 11,711; Referee: Akihiko Ikeuchi

3 June 2023 16	Nagoya Grampus	3–1	Cerezo Osaka	Toyota
16:00 JST (UTC+9)	Izumi 21'; Maruyama 31'; Mateus 43'	Report	Capixaba 4'	Stadium: Toyota Stadium; Attendance: 22,912; Referee: Yudai Yamamoto

11 June 2023 17	Nagoya Grampus	2–1	Avispa Fukuoka	Toyota
16:00 JST (UTC+9)	Mateus 45' (pen.); Junker 69'	Report	Mae (yellow card) 19'; Maejima (yellow card) 43'; Sato 65' (pen.)	Stadium: Toyota Stadium; Attendance: 13,992; Referee: Shu Kawamata

24 June 2023 18	FC Tokyo	2–0	Nagoya Grampus	Tokyo
19:00 JST (UTC+9)	Oliveira 18', 80' (yellow card) 58'; Abe (yellow card) 45+7'; Słowik (yellow card) 72'; Trevisan (yellow card) 84'	Report	Yonemoto (yellow card) 25'; Nagai (yellow card) 29'; Nogami (yellow card) 35'; Mateus (yellow card) 45+1'	Stadium: Ajinomoto Stadium; Attendance: 28,636; Referee: Takafumi Mikuriya

1 July 2023 19	Nagoya Grampus	2–0	Kawasaki Frontale	Toyota
18:00 JST (UTC+9)	Junker 41'; Izumi 64'	Report		Stadium: Toyota Stadium; Attendance: 25,560; Referee: Hiroyuki Kimura

8 July 2023 20	Nagoya Grampus	2–2	Yokohama F. Marinos	Toyota
18:00 JST (UTC+9)	Nagai 8' (yellow card) 49'; Izumi (yellow card) 25'; Junker 47' (yellow card) 62'	Report	Élber 28'; Fujita 35'; Matsubara (yellow card) 90'	Stadium: Toyota Stadium; Attendance: 29,743; Referee: Yusuke Araki

16 July 2023 21	Kyoto Sanga	2–1	Nagoya Grampus	Kameoka
19:00 JST (UTC+9)	Yamasaki 13'; Kaneko (yellow card) 53'; Fukuoka (yellow card) 58'; Patric 90+2'; Ota (yellow card) 90+5'	Report	Inagaki (yellow card) 10'; Izumi 62'	Stadium: Sanga Stadium by Kyocera; Attendance: 13,360; Referee: Jumpei Iida

5 August 2023 22	Nagoya Grampus	1–0	Albirex Niigata	Toyota
19:00 JST (UTC+9)	Morishita 14'; Junker (penalty missed) 60'; Yonemoto (yellow card) 85'	Report	Tagami (yellow card) 37'; Ota (yellow card) 75'; Ko (yellow card) 85'	Stadium: Toyota Stadium; Attendance: 57,058; Referee: Yudai Yamamoto

13 August 2023 23	Nagoya Grampus	1–0	Albirex Niigata	Toyota
18:00 JST (UTC+9)	Nogami 37'; Inagaki (yellow card) 85'; H.Fujii (yellow card) 89'	Report	Anzai (yellow card) 28'; T.Fujii (yellow card) 90+1'; Pituca (yellow card) 90+4'	Stadium: Toyota Stadium; Attendance: 38,642; Referee: Yoshiro Imamura

18 August 2023 24	Urawa Red Diamonds	1–0	Nagoya Grampus	Saitama
19:30 JST (UTC+9)	Kanté 11'; Koizumi (yellow card) 21'; Høibråten (yellow card) 45'; Okubo (yellow card) 60'; Linssen (yellow card) 89'	Report	Kawazura (yellow card) 16'; Maruyama (yellow card) 76'	Stadium: Saitama Stadium 2002; Attendance: 32,578; Referee: Akihiko Ikeuchi

26 August 2023 25	Cerezo Osaka	3–1	Nagoya Grampus	Osaka
19:00 JST (UTC+9)	Uejo 9', 71'; Kitano 88'	Report	Morishita 12'	Stadium: Yodoko Sakura Stadium; Attendance: 18,935; Referee: Koichiro Fukushima

2 September 2023 26	Nagoya Grampus	1–1	Yokohama FC	Toyota
18:00 JST (UTC+9)	Inagaki 22'; Nakashima (yellow card) 88'	Report	Takai 86'; Ito (yellow card) 90+1'	Stadium: Toyota Stadium; Attendance: 33,235; Referee: Hiroyuki Kimura

16 September 2023 27	Avispa Fukuoka	1–0	Nagoya Grampus	Fukuoka
19:05 JST (UTC+9)	Wellington 84'; Nara (yellow card) 89'	Report	Izumi (yellow card) 26'	Stadium: Best Denki Stadium; Attendance: 7,647; Referee: Takafumi Mikuriya

23 September 2023 28	Nagoya Grampus	1–1	Hokkaido Consadole Sapporo	Toyota
16:00 JST (UTC+9)	Junker 50'; Morishima (yellow card) 80'	Report	Okamura (yellow card) 19'; Miyazawa (yellow card) 26'; Suga (yellow card) 30'; Kobayashi 66' (yellow card) 70'	Stadium: Toyota Stadium; Attendance: 36,950; Referee: Koei Koya

30 September 2023 29	Sanfrecce Hiroshima	3–1	Nagoya Grampus	Hiroshima
19:00 JST (UTC+9)	Kato 72'; Vieira 81' (pen.); Ezequiel 85' (yellow card) 86'	Report	Morishita (yellow card) 38'; T.Uchida (yellow card) 48'; Junker 57'; Langerak (yellow card) 77'; Kawazura (yellow card) 77'	Stadium: Edion Stadium Hiroshima; Attendance: 17,728; Referee: Masuya Ueda

21 October 2023 30	Gamba Osaka	0–1	Nagoya Grampus	Suita
14:03 JST (UTC+9)	Kwon (yellow card) 52'; Yamamoto (yellow card) 57'	Report	Yonemoto (yellow card) 23'; Fujii 26'	Stadium: Suita City Football Stadium; Attendance: 23,153; Referee: Takuto Okabe

27 October 2023 31	Nagoya Grampus	1–1	Sagan Tosu	Gifu
19:00 JST (UTC+9)	Junker 65'; Yonemoto (yellow card) 77'; Morishita (yellow card) 90+5'	Report	Yamazaki (red card) 50'; Togashi 89'	Stadium: Gifu Nagaragawa Stadium; Attendance: 11,736; Referee: Hayato Shimizu

11 November 2023 32	Shonan Bellmare	2–1	Nagoya Grampus	Hiratsuka
14:00 JST (UTC+9)	Ohashi 15', 23'; Ishihara (yellow card) 90+6'	Report	Kubo 63'	Stadium: Lemon Gas Stadium Hiratsuka; Attendance: 11,227; Referee: Yuichi Nishimura

25 November 2023 33	Vissel Kobe	2–1	Nagoya Grampus	Kobe
14:00 JST (UTC+9)	Ide 12' (yellow card) 55'; Muto 14'	Report	Inagaki (yellow card) 26'; Junker 30'; Morishita (yellow card) 66'	Stadium: Noevir Stadium Kobe; Attendance: 25,365; Referee: Hayato Shimizu

3 December 2023 34	Nagoya Grampus	1–1	Kashiwa Reysol	Gifu
14:00 JST (UTC+9)	Junker 90+5' (pen.)	Report	Sávio 71' (yellow card) 78'; Diego (red card) 90+3'	Stadium: Gifu Nagaragawa Stadium; Attendance: 18,475; Referee: Masuya Ueda

=== Emperor's Cup ===
7 June 2023 Second Round	Nagoya Grampus	3–2	Veertien Mie	Nagoya
19:00 JST (UTC+9)	Nogami 2'; Fujii 35'; Kida 42'; Izumi (yellow card) 85'	Report	Tamura 71'; Terada (yellow card) 73'; Tanioku (yellow card) 74'; Anzai (yellow card) 75'; Ryang 76'	Stadium: Paloma Mizuho Rugby Stadium; Attendance: 5,340; Referee: Hirokazu Ohtsubo

12 July 2023 Third Round	Nagoya Grampus	1–1 (5–4 p)	Vegalta Sendai	Nagoya
19:00 JST (UTC+9)	Langerak (yellow card) 49'; T.Uchida (yellow card) 92'; Mateus 99'; Morishita (yellow card) 110'	Report	Sagara (yellow card) 63'; Koide (yellow card) 90+4'; Sugawara 105'	Stadium: CS Asset Minato Soccer Stadium; Attendance: 3,423; Referee: Hayato Shimizu
	Penalties
	Mateus (penalty scored); Inagaki (penalty scored); Fujii (penalty scored); Nakatani (penalty scored); Junker (penalty scored)		(penalty scored) Nakajima; (penalty scored) Heo; (penalty scored) Sugawara; (penalty scored) Matsushita; (penalty missed) Hachisuka

2 August 2023 Fourth Round	Nagoya Grampus	3–0	Urawa Red Diamonds	Toyota
19:00 JST (UTC+9)	Mateus 25'; Junker 75'; Izumi 84'	Report	Okubo (yellow card) 50'; Ohata (yellow card) 86'	Stadium: Toyota Stadium; Attendance: 6,975; Referee: Takuto Okabe

30 August 2023 Quarterfinal	Kashiwa Reysol	2–0	Nagoya Grampus	Kashiwa
19:00 JST (UTC+9)	Sento (yellow card) 65'; Toshima 69'; Matheus Sávio 90+3'	Report	Shigehiro (yellow card) 37'; Maeda (yellow card) 52'	Stadium: Sankyo Frontier Kashiwa Stadium; Attendance: 6,156; Referee: Jumpei Iida

=== J.League Cup ===
==== Group stage ====
Pos	Team	Pld	W	D	L	GF	GA	GD	Pts	Qualification
1	Nagoya Grampus (Q)	6	5	0	1	11	5	+6	15	Advance to knockout stage
2	Sanfrecce Hiroshima	6	3	0	3	12	7	+5	9	Possible knockout stage
3	Yokohama FC	6	2	0	4	7	10	−3	6 (Note: Head-to-head points: Yokohama FC 3 (GD +1), Vissel Kobe 3 (GD -1).)	
4	Vissel Kobe	6	2	0	4	4	12	−8	6	

Updated to match(es) played on 24 May 2023. Source: JLeague.co (EN), JLeague.jp (JA)
Rules for classification: Tiebreakers
(Q) Qualified for the phase indicated
Notes:

8 March 2023 1	Vissel Kobe	0–2	Nagoya Grampus	Kobe
19:03 JST (UTC+9)	Hatsuse (yellow card) 47'; Sasaki (yellow card) 59'	Report	Sakai 23', 75'	Stadium: Noevir Stadium Kobe; Attendance: 4,084; Referee: Yusuke Araki

26 March 2023 2	Sanfrecce Hiroshima	1–2	Nagoya Grampus	Hiroshima
14:03 JST (UTC+9)	Kawamura 29'; Shibasaki (yellow card) 56'	Report	Morishita 61'; Nagai 63'	Stadium: Edion Stadium Hiroshima; Attendance: 8,807; Referee: Hiroyuki Kimura

5 April 2023 3	Nagoya Grampus	3–2	Yokohama FC	Nagoya
19:33 JST (UTC+9)	Sakai 45+1', 90'; Nagai 78'	Report	Nakamura 28'; Ito 42'; Brodersen (yellow card) 45'	Stadium: Toyota Stadium; Attendance: 6,465; Referee: Atsushi Kamimura

19 April 2023 4	Yokohama FC	0–2	Nagoya Grampus	Yokohama
19:00 JST (UTC+9)	Hashimoto (yellow card) 84'	Report	Kida 41', 52'; Yoshida (yellow card) 45+1'	Stadium: Nippatsu Mitsuzawa Stadium; Attendance: 2,818; Referee: Akihiko Ikeuchi

24 May 2023 5	Nagoya Grampus	0–1	Vissel Kobe	Nagoya
19:30 JST (UTC+9)		Report	Samper (yellow card) 41'; Lincoln 64'	Stadium: Toyota Stadium; Attendance: 6,266; Referee: Masuya Ueda

18 June 2023 6	Nagoya Grampus	2–1	Sanfrecce Hiroshima	Nagoya
18:00 JST (UTC+9)	Izumi (yellow card) 10' (goal) 37'; Ishida 68'; Takeda (yellow card) 89'	Report	Ben Khalifa (yellow card) 64'; Shibasaki 80'; Aoyama (yellow card) 90+2'	Stadium: Toyota Stadium; Attendance: 7,806; Referee: Futoshi Nakamura

==== Knockout stages ====
6 September 2023 Quarterfinal 1st leg	Nagoya Grampus	1–1	Kashima Antlers	Toyota
19:33 JST (UTC+9)	Fujii (yellow card) 27'; Nakatani (yellow card) 42'; Junker (yellow card) 50'; Inagaki (yellow card) 53'; Kubo 90+4'	Report	Matsumura 49'	Stadium: Toyota Stadium; Attendance: 8,089; Referee: Yudai Yamamoto

10 September 2023 Quarterfinal 2nd leg	Kashima Antlers	1–2 (a.e.t.) (2–3 agg.)	Nagoya Grampus	Kashima
18:03 JST (UTC+9)	Nakama 51'	Report	Nakashima 3' (yellow card) 12'; Nagai (yellow card) 41'; T.Uchida (yellow card) 78'; Yoshida 119'	Stadium: Kashima Soccer Stadium; Attendance: 14,310; Referee: Yuichi Nishimura

11 October 2023 Semifinal 1st leg	Avispa Fukuoka	1–0	Nagoya Grampus	Fukuoka
19:03 JST (UTC+9)	Tsuruno 45+3'; Konno (yellow card) 67'; Kamekawa (yellow card) 73'	Report	Maruyama (yellow card) 79'; Morishita (yellow card) 90+6'	Stadium: Best Denki Stadium; Attendance: 6,980; Referee: Jumpei Iida

15 October 2023 Semifinal 2nd leg	Nagoya Grampus	0–1 (0–2 agg.)	Avispa Fukuoka	Toyota
15:03 JST (UTC+9)	Fujii (yellow card) 63'	Report	Wellington 5'	Stadium: Toyota Stadium; Attendance: 24,876; Referee: Yoshiro Imamura

== Squad statistics ==
As of match played 3 December 2023

=== Appearances and goals ===
No.	Pos	Nat	Player	Total		J1 League		Emperor's Cup		J.League Cup	
No.	Pos	Nat	Player	Apps	Goals	Apps	Goals	Apps	Goals	Apps	Goals
1	GK	(Australia) AUS	Mitchell Langerak	43	0	34	0	3	0	6	0
2	DF	(Japan) JPN	Yuki Nogami	41	2	21+10	1	4	1	5+1	0
3	DF	(Japan) JPN	Yuichi Maruyama	24	1	9+7	1	2	0	5+1	0
4	DF	(Japan) JPN	Shinnosuke Nakatani	44	1	33	1	2+1	0	8	0
6	MF	(Japan) JPN	Takuji Yonemoto	32	0	22+4	0	0+1	0	1+4	0
7	MF	(Japan) JPN	Ryuji Izumi	39	5	24+4	3	2+2	1	5+2	1
9	MF	(Japan) JPN	Noriyoshi Sakai	28	4	3+17	0	4	0	4	4
13	DF	(Japan) JPN	Haruya Fujii	46	3	34	2	4	1	8	0
14	MF	(Japan) JPN	Tsukasa Morishima	16	0	8+4	0	0	0	2+2	0
15	MF	(Japan) JPN	Sho Inagaki	45	3	33	3	3+1	0	7+1	0
16	GK	(Japan) JPN	Yohei Takeda	5	0	0	0	1	0	4	0
17	DF	(Japan) JPN	Ryoya Morishita	42	5	30+3	4	1+3	0	3+2	1
18	FW	(Japan) JPN	Kensuke Nagai	43	6	30+3	4	2+1	0	4+3	2
19	MF	(Japan) JPN	Takuya Shigehiro	7	0	0+3	0	2	0	1+1	0
20	MF	(Japan) JPN	Tojiro Kubo	12	2	5+3	1	1	0	0+3	1
21	MF	(Brazil) BRA	Thales Paula	13	0	1+6	0	0+2	0	3+1	0
24	DF	(Japan) JPN	Akinari Kawazura	23	0	12+1	0	2+2	0	5+1	0
25	MF	(Japan) JPN	Naoki Maeda	16	0	2+9	0	1	0	1+3	0
27	FW	(Japan) JPN	Taika Nakashima	15	1	1+10	0	0	0	3+1	1
30	DF	(Japan) JPN	Ei Gyotoku	1	0	0	0	0	0	0+1	0
31	MF	(Japan) JPN	Haruki Yoshida	7	1	0+2	0	1	0	3+1	1
33	MF	(Japan) JPN	Hidemasa Koda	7	0	0+2	0	0+1	0	4	0
34	MF	(Japan) JPN	Takuya Uchida	38	0	19+10	0	2	0	6+1	0
35	MF	(Japan) JPN	Riku Yamada	13	0	0+6	0	2	0	3+2	0
42	FW	(Japan) JPN	Ryoga Kida	19	3	0+12	0	1+1	1	4+1	2
43	MF	(Japan) JPN	Haruto Suzuki	1	0	0	0	0	0	1	0
44	DF	(Japan) JPN	Ryuhei Osada	1	0	0	0	0	0	1	0
45	MF	(Japan) JPN	Ken Masui	2	0	0+1	0	0	0	1	0
46	MF	(Japan) JPN	Ryotaro Ishida	10	1	0+4	0	1	0	1+4	1
47	FW	(Japan) JPN	Kyota Sakakibara	1	0	0	0	0	0	1	0
49	DF	(Japan) JPN	Shoma Ota	1	0	0	0	0	0	0+1	0
50	MF	(Japan) JPN	Kosuke Uchida	1	0	0	0	0	0	0+1	0
77	FW	(Denmark) DEN	Kasper Junker	42	17	31+2	16	0+3	1	2+4	0
Players away on loan:
32	FW	(Japan) JPN	Koki Toyoda	2	0	0	0	0	0	1+1	0
Players who left Nagoya Grampus during the season:
5	MF	(Japan) JPN	Kazuki Nagasawa	16	0	1+9	0	1+1	0	4	0
10	MF	(Brazil) BRA	Mateus	28	6	21	4	2+1	2	3+1	0
92	FW	(Brazil) BRA	Leonardo	7	0	0+3	0	0+1	0	0+3	0

=== Goalscorers ===
Place	Position	Nation	Number	Name	J1 League	Emperor's Cup	J.League Cup	Total
1	FW	(Denmark)	77	Kasper Junker	16	1	0	17
2	MF	(Brazil)	10	Mateus	4	2	0	6
2	FW	(Japan)	18	Kensuke Nagai	4	0	2	6
4	DF	(Japan)	17	Ryoya Morishita	4	0	1	5
4	MF	(Japan)	7	Ryuji Izumi	3	1	1	5
6	MF	(Japan)	9	Noriyoshi Sakai	0	0	4	4
7	MF	(Japan)	15	Sho Inagaki	3	0	0	3
7	DF	(Japan)	13	Haruya Fujii	2	1	0	3
7	FW	(Japan)	42	Ryoga Kida	0	1	2	3
10	DF	(Japan)	2	Yuki Nogami	1	1	0	2
10	MF	(Japan)	20	Tojiro Kubo	1	0	1	2
12	DF	(Japan)	4	Shinnosuke Nakatani	1	0	0	1
12	DF	(Japan)	3	Yuichi Maruyama	1	0	0	1
12	MF	(Japan)	46	Ryotaro Ishida	0	0	1	1
12	FW	(Japan)	27	Taika Nakashima	0	0	1	1
12	MF	(Japan)	31	Haruki Yoshida	0	0	1	1
12				Own goal	1	0	0	1
				TOTALS	40	7	14	61

=== Clean sheets ===
Place	Position	Nation	Number	Name	J1 League	Emperor's Cup	J.League Cup	Total
1	GK	(Australia)	1	Mitchell Langerak	9	1	1	11
2	GK	(Japan)	16	Yohei Takeda	0	0	1	1
TOTALS					9	1	2	12

=== Disciplinary record ===
Number	Nation	Position	Name	J1 League		Emperor's Cup		J.League Cup		Total	
Number	Nation	Position	Name	Booked	Sent off (straight red)	Booked	Sent off (straight red)	Booked	Sent off (straight red)	Booked	Sent off (straight red)
1	(Australia)	GK	Mitchell Langerak	2	0	1	0	0	0	3	0
2	(Japan)	DF	Yuki Nogami	2	0	0	0	0	0	2	0
3	(Japan)	DF	Yuichi Maruyama	1	0	0	0	1	0	2	0
4	(Japan)	DF	Shinnosuke Nakatani	2	0	0	0	1	0	3	0
6	(Japan)	MF	Takuji Yonemoto	7	0	0	0	0	0	7	0
7	(Japan)	MF	Ryuji Izumi	3	0	1	0	1	0	5	0
13	(Japan)	DF	Haruya Fujii	2	0	0	0	2	0	4	0
14	(Japan)	MF	Tsukasa Morishima	1	0	0	0	0	0	1	0
15	(Japan)	MF	Sho Inagaki	4	0	0	0	1	0	5	0
16	(Japan)	GK	Yohei Takeda	0	0	0	0	1	0	1	0
17	(Japan)	DF	Ryoya Morishita	6	0	1	0	1	0	8	0
18	(Japan)	FW	Kensuke Nagai	4	0	0	0	1	0	5	0
19	(Japan)	MF	Takuya Shigehiro	0	0	1	0	0	0	1	0
24	(Japan)	DF	Akinari Kawazura	2	0	0	0	0	0	2	0
25	(Japan)	MF	Naoki Maeda	0	0	1	0	0	0	1	0
27	(Japan)	FW	Taika Nakashima	1	0	0	0	1	0	2	0
31	(Japan)	MF	Haruki Yoshida	0	0	0	0	1	0	1	0
34	(Japan)	MF	Takuya Uchida	2	0	1	0	1	0	4	0
46	(Japan)	MF	Ryotaro Ishida	1	0	0	0	0	0	1	0
77	(Denmark)	FW	Kasper Junker	2	0	0	0	1	0	3	0
Players away on loan:
Players who left Nagoya Grampus during the season:
5	(Japan)	MF	Kazuki Nagasawa	1	0	0	0	0	0	1	0
10	(Brazil)	MF	Mateus	3	0	0	0	0	0	3	0
			TOTALS	48	0	4	0	13	0	65	0
