= 2024 Nagoya Grampus season =

Nagoya Grampus
2024 season
- Chairman: Toyo Kato
- Manager: Kenta Hasegawa
- Stadium: Toyota Stadium
- J1 League: 11th
- Emperor's Cup: Second round
- J.League Cup: Winners
- Top goalscorer: League: Kensuke Nagai (6 goals); All: Kensuke Nagai (9 goals)
- Average home league attendance: 27,650
Home colours	Away colours

The 2024 season was Nagoya Grampus' 7th consecutive season in the J1 League, the top flight of Japanese football since the introduction of professional football in 1993. As well as the domestic league, they competed in the Emperor's Cup and the J.League Cup.

== Squad ==
As of match played 8 December 2024

No.	Name	Nationality	Position	Date of birth (age)	Signed from	Signed in	Contract ends	Apps.	Goals
Goalkeepers
1	Mitchell Langerak	(Australia)	GK	22 August 1988 (aged 36)	Levante	2018		286	0
16	Yohei Takeda	(Japan)	GK	30 June 1987 (aged 37)	Oita Trinita	2016		57	0
35	Alexandre Pisano	(Japan)	GK	10 January 2006 (aged 18)	Academy	2024		1	0
37	Daichi Sugimoto	(Japan)	GK	15 July 1993 (aged 31)	Vegalta Sendai	2023		0	0
Defenders
2	Yuki Nogami	(Japan)	DF	20 April 1991 (aged 33)	Sanfrecce Hiroshima	2023		76	4
3	Ha Chang-rae	(South Korea)	DF	16 October 1994 (aged 30)	Pohang Steelers	2024		27	3
4	Shion Inoue	(Japan)	DF	25 April 2000 (aged 24)	Ventforet Kofu	2024		4	0
20	KennedyEgbus Mikuni	(Japan)	DF	23 June 2000 (aged 24)	Avispa Fukuoka	2024		44	3
24	Akinari Kawazura	(Japan)	DF	3 May 1994 (aged 30)	Omiya Ardija	2022		60	0
44	Soichiro Mori	(Japan)	DF	29 June 2007 (aged 17)	Academy	2024		0	0
55	Shuhei Tokumoto	(Japan)	DF	12 September 1995 (aged 29)	on loan from FC Tokyo	2024		15	0
66	Ryosuke Yamanaka	(Japan)	DF	20 April 1993 (aged 31)	Cerezo Osaka	2024		25	1
Midfielders
5	Haruki Yoshida	(Japan)	MF	29 April 2003 (aged 21)	Academy	2022		34	4
7	Ryuji Izumi	(Japan)	MF	6 November 1993 (aged 31)	Kashima Antlers	2023		209	18
8	Keiya Shiihashi	(Japan)	MF	20 June 1997 (aged 27)	Kashiwa Reysol	2024		44	2
14	Tsukasa Morishima	(Japan)	MF	25 April 1997 (aged 27)	Sanfrecce Hiroshima	2023		61	3
15	Sho Inagaki	(Japan)	MF	25 December 1991 (aged 32)	Sanfrecce Hiroshima	2020		225	27
17	Ken Masui	(Japan)	MF	4 April 2001 (aged 23)	Kwansei Gakuin University	2024		32	2
19	Takuya Shigehiro	(Japan)	MF	5 May 1995 (aged 29)	Avispa Fukuoka	2022		22	1
27	Katsuhiro Nakayama	(Japan)	MF	17 July 1996 (aged 28)	Shimizu S-Pulse	2024		42	2
32	Haruto Suzuki	(Japan)	MF	17 May 2005 (aged 19)	Academy	2022		3	0
33	Taichi Kikuchi	(Japan)	MF	7 May 1999 (aged 25)	Sagan Tosu	2024		17	1
34	Takuya Uchida	(Japan)	MF	2 June 1998 (aged 26)	FC Tokyo	2024		99	0
41	Masahito Ono	(Japan)	MF	9 August 1996 (aged 28)	Montedio Yamagata	2024		6	0
43	Yuto Nishimori	(Japan)	MF	23 May 2006 (aged 18)	Academy	2024		0	0
45	José Carabalí	(Ecuador)	MF	19 May 1997 (aged 27)	Always Ready	2024		1	0
Forwards
10	Patric	(Brazil)	FW	26 October 1987 (aged 37)	Kyoto Sanga	2024		40	8
11	Yuya Yamagishi	(Japan)	FW	29 August 1993 (aged 31)	Avispa Fukuoka	2024		31	6
18	Kensuke Nagai	(Japan)	FW	5 March 1989 (aged 35)	FC Tokyo	2022		300	77
28	Kyota Sakakibara	(Japan)	FW	20 October 2001 (aged 23)	Rissho University	2024		11	0
42	Shungo Sugiura	(Japan)	FW	14 May 2006 (aged 18)	Academy	2024		0	0
77	Kasper Junker	(Denmark)	FW	5 March 1994 (aged 30)	Urawa Red Diamonds	2024		66	21
Away on loan
6	Takuji Yonemoto	(Japan)	MF	3 December 1990 (aged 34)	Tokyo	2019		145	1
9	Noriyoshi Sakai	(Japan)	MF	9 November 1992 (aged 32)	Sagan Tosu	2022		56	7
23	Daiki Mitsui	(Japan)	GK	27 May 2001 (aged 23)	Academy	2020		0	0
25	Tojiro Kubo	(Japan)	MF	5 April 1999 (aged 25)	Fujieda MYFC	2023		29	3
30	Ei Gyotoku	(Japan)	GK	17 December 2004 (aged 19)	Shizuoka Gakuen HS	2023		2	0
	John Higashi	(Japan)	GK	2 May 2002 (aged 22)	Academy	2021		0	0
	Ryoya Morishita	(Japan)	DF	11 April 1997 (aged 27)	Sagan Tosu	2021		122	7
	Ryoga Kida	(Japan)	FW	15 July 2005 (aged 19)	Academy	2022		21	3
	Koki Toyoda	(Japan)	FW	11 April 2003 (aged 21)	Academy	2022		4	0
Left during the season
21	Thales Paula	(Brazil)	MF	29 June 2001 (aged 23)	Roasso Kumamoto	2022		15	0
22	Yuki Soma	(Japan)	MF	25 February 1997 (aged 27)	Academy	2018		161	14

== Transfers ==
=== Arrivals ===
Date	Position	Player	From	Type	Source
10 May 2022	MF	(Japan) Kyota Sakakibara	(Japan) Rissho University	Full	
11 September 2022	MF	(Japan) Ken Masui	(Japan) Kwansei Gakuin University	Full	
20 December 2023	DF	(Japan) Ryosuke Yamanaka	(Japan) Cerezo Osaka	Full	
25 December 2023	DF	(Japan) KennedyEgbus Mikuni	(Japan) Avispa Fukuoka	Full	
26 December 2023	MF	(Japan) Katsuhiro Nakayama	(Japan) Shimizu S-Pulse	Full	
27 December 2023	MF	(Japan) Takuya Uchida	(Japan) FC Tokyo	Full	
27 December 2023	MF	(Japan) Keiya Shiihashi	(Japan) Kashiwa Reysol	Full	
27 December 2023	MF	(Japan) Masahito Ono	(Japan) Montedio Yamagata	Full	
29 December 2023	FW	(Japan) Yuya Yamagishi	(Japan) Avispa Fukuoka	Full	
6 January 2024	DF	(Japan) Shion Inoue	(Japan) Ventforet Kofu	Full	
7 January 2024	MF	(Japan) Shumpei Naruse	(Japan) Mito HollyHock	Loan return	
9 January 2024	FW	(Brazil) Patric	(Japan) Kyoto Sanga	Full	
10 January 2024	DF	(South Korea) Ha Chang-rae	(South Korea) Pohang Steelers	Full	
11 January 2024	FW	(Denmark) Kasper Junker	(Japan) Urawa Red Diamonds	Full	

=== Departures ===
Date	Position	Player	To	Type	Source
21 December 2023	DF	(Japan) Shinnosuke Nakatani	(Japan) Gamba Osaka	Full	
22 December 2023	DF	(Japan) Ryoya Morishita	(Poland) Legia Warsaw	Loan	
26 December 2023	MF	(Japan) Riku Yamada	(Japan) V-Varen Nagasaki	Full	
29 December 2023	GK	(Japan) John Higashi	(Japan) FC Ryukyu	Loan	
29 December 2023	FW	(Japan) Taika Nakashima	(Japan) Hokkaido Consadole Sapporo	Loan return	
29 December 2023	MF	(Japan) Hidemasa Koda	(Japan) Mito Hollyhock	Loan	
4 January 2024	MF	(Japan) Yuichi Maruyama	(Japan) Kawasaki Frontale	Full	
6 January 2024	FW	(Japan) Koki Toyoda	(Japan) Iwate Grulla Morioka	Loan	
7 January 2024	FW	(Japan) Naoki Maeda	(Japan) Urawa Red Diamonds	Full	
10 January 2024	DF	(Japan) Haruya Fujii	(Belgium) K.V. Kortrijk	Loan	
4 February 2024	FW	(Japan) Ryoga Kida	(Argentina) Argentinos Juniors	Loan	

== Competitions ==
=== Overview ===
Competition	First match	Last match	Starting round	Final position	Record							
Competition	First match	Last match	Starting round	Final position	Pld	W	D	L	GF	GA	GD	Win %
J1 League	23 February 2024	8 December 2024	Matchday 1	11th	38	15	5	18	44	47	−3	39.47
Emperor's Cup	12 June 2024	12 June 2024	Second Round	Second Round	1	0	0	1	0	1	−1	0.00
J.League Cup	17 April 2024	2 November 2024	Second Round	Winners	9	5	2	2	16	10	+6	55.56
Total					48	20	7	21	60	58	+2	41.67

Last updated: 8 December 2024
Source: Competitions

=== J1 League ===
==== League table ====
Pos	Team	Pld	W	D	L	GF	GA	GD	Pts
9	Yokohama F. Marinos	38	15	7	16	61	62	−1	52
10	Cerezo Osaka	38	13	13	12	43	48	−5	52
11	Nagoya Grampus	38	15	5	18	44	47	−3	50
12	Avispa Fukuoka	38	12	14	12	33	38	−5	50
13	Urawa Red Diamonds	38	12	12	14	49	45	+4	48

Source: JLeague.co, JLeague.jp, J.League Data Site
Rules for classification: 1) Points; 2) Goal difference; 3) Goals scored; 4) Head-to-head points; 5) Head-to-head goal difference; 6) Head-to-head goals scored; 7) Fewer disciplinary points.

==== Results by round ====
Round	1	2	3	4	5	6	7	8	9	10	11	12	13	14	15	16	17	18	19	20	21	22	23	24	25	26	27	28	30	29	31	32	33	34	35	36	37	38
Ground	H	H	A	A	H	A	H	A	H	A	H	A	H	H	A	H	A	H	A	H	A	A	H	A	A	H	H	A	A	H	A	H	A	H	A	A	H	A
Result	L	L	L	W	W	W	D	W	W	L	L	W	L	W	W	D	L	D	L	L	L	L	W	D	L	W	L	W	L	W	W	W	L	L	L	D	L	W
Position	20	20	20	18	12	8	10	8	5	6	8	7	10	7	5	5	7	9	9	10	11	12	11	12	13	12	14	11	14	9	8	8	9	9	9	9	13	11

Updated to match(es) played on 8 December 2024. Source: J. League Data Site
A = Away; H = Home; W = Win; D = Draw; L = Loss

==== Matches ====
The full league fixtures were released on 23 January 2024.

23 February 2024 1	Nagoya Grampus	0–3	Kashima Antlers	Toyota
18:03 JST (UTC+9)		Report	Nakama 19', 62'; Čavrić 47'	Stadium: Toyota Stadium; Attendance: 36,933; Referee: Yusuke Araki

2 March 2024 2	Nagoya Grampus	0–1	Machida Zelvia	Toyota
14:03 JST	Ha C-R (yellow card) 46'; Nogami (yellow card) 54'; Masui (yellow card) 79'; Yonemoto (red card) 87'	Report	Fujio 21'; Jang (yellow card) 39'; Drešević (yellow card) 55'; Shibato (yellow card) 82'	Stadium: Toyota Stadium; Attendance: 30,415; Referee: Yoshihiro Imamura

9 March 2024 3	Albirex Niigata	1–0	Nagoya Grampus	Niigata
14:05 JST	Arai (yellow card) 83'; Hasegawa 88'	Report	Nagai (yellow card) 29'	Stadium: Denka Big Swan Stadium; Attendance: 22,942; Referee: Akihiko Ikeuchi

16 March 2024 4	Kashiwa Reysol	0–2	Nagoya Grampus	Kashiwa
15:03 JST	Shimamura (yellow card) 83'	Report	Nagai 18' Ha C-R (yellow card) 29' (goal) 62'; Kubo (yellow card) 37'; Mikuni (yellow card) 45+2'	Stadium: Sankyo Frontier Kashiwa Stadium; Attendance: 12,897; Referee: Koei Koya

30 March 2024 5	Nagoya Grampus	2–1	Yokohama F. Marinos	Toyota
16:03 JST	Morishima (yellow card) 33' (goal) 77'; Yamanaka 90+2'	Report	Anderson (yellow card) 25'; Nagato 54'; Uenaka (yellow card) 62'; Kamijima (yellow card) 83'	Stadium: Toyota Stadium; Attendance: 31,844; Referee: Hayato Shimizu

3 April 2024 6	Hokkaido Consadole Sapporo	1–2	Nagoya Grampus	Sapporo
19:33 JST	Arano (yellow card) 26'; Baba 30'; Suga (yellow card) 53'	Report	Yoshida (yellow card) 37'; Morishima 55'; Nagai 90'; Mikuni (yellow card) 90+5'	Stadium: Sapporo Dome; Attendance: 9,564; Referee: Jumpei Iida

7 April 2024 7	Nagoya Grampus	0–0	Avispa Fukuoka	Toyota
15:03 JST	Kawazura (yellow card) 26'; Shiihashi (yellow card) 45'	Report	Tashiro (yellow card) 43'; Mae (yellow card) 79'; Miya (yellow card) 90+2'	Stadium: Toyota Stadium; Attendance: 23,134; Referee: Shu Kawamta

13 April 2024 8	Júbilo Iwata	0–1	Nagoya Grampus	Iwata
14:03 JST	Uehara (yellow card) 40'; Germain (yellow card) 72'; Peixoto (yellow card) 75'	Report	Masui 8' (red card) 43'; Izumi (yellow card) 45+3'; Ha C-R (yellow card) 61'	Stadium: Yamaha Stadium; Attendance: 13,135; Referee: Masuya Ueda

21 April 2024 9	Nagoya Grampus	2–1	Cerezo Osaka	Toyota
15:03 JST	Yoshida (yellow card) 23'; Mikuni (yellow card) 62' (goal) 65'; Nagai 82'; Ha C-R (yellow card) 87'; Morishima (yellow card) 90+3'	Report	Léo Ceará 67'; Capixaba (yellow card) 78'	Stadium: Toyota Stadium; Attendance: 25,341; Referee: Atsushi Kamimura

28 April 2024 10	Urawa Red Diamonds	2–1	Nagoya Grampus	Saitama
15:03 JST	Thiago Santana (yellow card) 16' (goal) 70' (pen.); Yasui 24'; Ito (yellow card) 31'	Report	Yonemoto (yellow card) 41'; Izumi 78'	Stadium: Saitama Stadium 2002; Attendance: 42,265; Referee: Yusuke Araki

3 May 2024 11	Nagoya Grampus	0–2	Vissel Kobe	Toyota
19:03 JST (UTC+9)		Report	Yamaguchi 40'; Thuler (yellow card) 70'; Miyashiro (yellow card) 76'; Osako 81'	Stadium: Toyota Stadium; Attendance: 38,955; Referee: Yudai Yamamoto

6 May 2024 12	Sanfrecce Hiroshima	2–3	Nagoya Grampus	Hiroshima
15:03 JST (UTC+9)	Koshimichi 23'; Nakano 48'	Report	Patric 2'; Inagaki 18'; Morishima (yellow card) 45+4'; Sasaki 84' (o.g.)	Stadium: Edion Peace Wing Hiroshima; Attendance: 25,193; Referee: Takafumi Mikuriya

11 May 2024 13	Nagoya Grampus	0–1	Gamba Osaka	Toyota
16:03 JST (UTC+9)	Ha C-R (yellow card) 51'	Report	Kishimoto 67'	Stadium: Toyota Stadium; Attendance: 30,613; Referee: Koichiro Fukushima

15 May 2024 14	Nagoya Grampus	3–1	FC Tokyo	Toyota
19:03 JST (UTC+9)	Uchida (yellow card) 14'; Yoshida (yellow card) 17'; Nagai (yellow card) 28'; Junker 33' (pen.), 66', 71'	Report	Bangnagande (yellow card) 23'; Araki 78'; Kimoto (yellow card) 81'	Stadium: Toyota Stadium; Attendance: 14,553; Referee: Jumpei Iida

18 May 2024 15	Sagan Tosu	0–2	Nagoya Grampus	Tosu
19:04 JST (UTC+9)	Harada (red card) 12'	Report	Inagaki 6'; Izumi (yellow card) 45+6'; Masui 50'	Stadium: Ekimae Real Estate Stadium; Attendance: 8,325; Referee: Imamura Yoshiro

26 May 2024 16	Nagoya Grampus	1–1	Kyoto Sanga	Toyota
15:03 JST (UTC+9)	Izumi (yellow card) 50'; Uchida (yellow card) 60'; Keiya 75'; Nakayama (yellow card) 90+6'	Report	Toyokawa (yellow card) 11' (goal) 35'; Miyayoshi (yellow card) 67'	Stadium: Toyota Stadium; Attendance: 23,405; Referee: Kamimura Atsushi

2 June 2024 17	Kawasaki Frontale	2–1	Nagoya Grampus	Kawasaki
17:03 JST (UTC+9)	Ienaga 6', 18'; Takai (yellow card) 53'; Tachibanada (yellow card) 85'	Report	Ha C-R 89'	Stadium: Kawasaki Todoroki Stadium; Attendance: 19,463; Referee: Mikuriya Takafumi

16 June 2024 18	Nagoya Grampus	1–1	Shonan Bellmare	Toyota
18:48 JST (UTC+9)	Nagai 33'	Report	Fukuda (yellow card) 52'; Onose 60'	Stadium: Toyota Stadium; Attendance: 21,990; Referee: Yoshimi Yamashita

22 June 2024 19	Tokyo Verdy	1–0	Nagoya Grampus	Tokyo
18:03 JST (UTC+9)	Saito (yellow card) 49'; Onaga 52'; Yamami (yellow card) 66'; Taniguchi (yellow card) 87'	Report		Stadium: Ajinomoto Stadium; Attendance: 20,105; Referee: Darren England

26 June 2024 20	Nagoya Grampus	0–1	Urawa Red Diamonds	Toyota
19:03 JST (UTC+9)	Uchida (yellow card) 37' (yellow-red card) 57'; Nogami (yellow card) 55'; Kubo (yellow card) 81'; Patric (yellow card) 90+2'; Ha C-R (yellow card) 90+6'	Report	Watanabe 7'	Stadium: Toyota Stadium; Attendance: 15,796; Referee: Akihiko Ikeuchi

30 June 2024 21	Cerezo Osaka	2–1	Nagoya Grampus	Osaka
18:03 JST (UTC+9)	Léo Ceará 26'; Fernandes 65'; Watanabe (yellow card) 90+4'	Report	Mikuni (yellow card) 30'; Kubo 76'; Shiihashi (yellow card) 86'	Stadium: Yodoko Sakura Stadium; Attendance: Yudai Yamamoto; Referee: 16,400

6 July 2024 22	Machida Zelvia	1–0	Nagoya Grampus	Tokyo
18:03 JST (UTC+9)	Shimoda 30'; Shoji (yellow card) 43'; Fujimoto (yellow card) 70'	Report	Shiihashi (yellow card) 14'; Patric (yellow card) 90+6'	Stadium: Machida GION Stadium; Attendance: 9,117; Referee: Atsushi Kamimura

14 July 2024 23	Nagoya Grampus	2–1	Kashiwa Reysol	Toyota
18:03 JST (UTC+9)	Soma 54' (yellow card) 64'; Yamagishi 56'	Report	Sávio 6'; Shirai (yellow card) 63'; Sekine (yellow card) 90+5'	Stadium: Toyota Stadium; Attendance: 31,961; Referee: Jumpei Iida

20 July 2024 24	Vissel Kobe	3–3	Nagoya Grampus	Kobe
19:03 JST (UTC+9)	Sasaki 33'; Yamauchi 90' (yellow card) 90+5'; Kikuchi 90+3'; Maekawa (yellow card) 90+7'	Report	Patric 22'; Inagaki 54', 90+10' (pen.); Ha C-R (yellow card) 90+2'	Stadium: Noevir Stadium Kobe; Attendance: 23,650; Referee: Hiroyuki Kimura

7 August 2024 25	Kyoto Sanga	3–2	Nagoya Grampus	Kyoto
19:03 JST (UTC+9)	Papagaio 59'; Hara 71'; Túlio 79'	Report	Patric 5', 19'; Uchida (red card) 47'; Morishima (yellow card) 65'	Stadium: Sanga Stadium by Kyocera; Attendance: 14,924; Referee: Koichiro Fukushima

11 August 2024 26	Nagoya Grampus	1–0	Tokyo Verdy	Toyota
19:03 JST (UTC+9)	Patric 7'; Shigehiro (yellow card) 61'; Langerak (yellow card) 90+8'	Report	Tsunashima (yellow card) 82'	Stadium: Toyota Stadium; Attendance: 40,498; Referee: Takafumi Mikuriya

17 August 2024 27	Nagoya Grampus	1–2	Sanfrecce Hiroshima	Toyota
19:03 JST (UTC+9)	Izumi (yellow card) 79'; Junker 88'	Report	Kawabe (yellow card) 45+1'; Araki 48'; Kato 55'	Stadium: Toyota Stadium; Attendance: 38,219; Referee: Ryo Tanimoto

24 August 2024 28	Shonan Bellmare	0–1	Nagoya Grampus	Hiratsuka
19:03 JST (UTC+9)	Kim M-t (yellow card) 71'	Report	Mikuni 7'	Stadium: Lemon Gas Stadium Hiratsuka; Attendance: 12,797; Referee: Takuto Okabe

14 September 2024 30	FC Tokyo	4–1	Nagoya Grampus	Tokyo
19:04 JST (UTC+9)	Higashi 13'; Oliveira 31' (pen.); Trevisan (yellow card) 50'; Ko 65'; Nakagawa 81'; T.Nozawa (yellow card) 87'	Report	Junker (yellow card) 7'; Inagaki (yellow card) 17' (goal) 85'; Uchida (yellow card) 29'	Stadium: Japan National Stadium; Attendance: 55,896; Referee: César Ramos

18 September 2024 29	Nagoya Grampus	3–0	Albirex Niigata	Toyota
19:03 JST (UTC+9)	Nogami 15'; Nagai 44'; Kikuchi 78'	Report	Akiyama (yellow card) 62'	Stadium: Toyota Stadium; Attendance: 10,083; Referee: Yusuke Ohashi

22 September 2024 31	Nagoya Grampus	2–0	Kawasaki Frontale	Toyota
16:04 JST (UTC+9)	Nagai 34'; Tokumoto (yellow card) 64'; Izumi 67'	Report	van Wermeskerken (yellow card) 80' (yellow-red card) 82'	Stadium: Toyota Stadium; Attendance: 32,768; Referee: Abdulhadi Al Ruaile

28 September 2024 32	Nagoya Grampus	2–0	Júbilo Iwata	Toyota
16:03 JST (UTC+9)	Shiihashi (yellow card) 29'; Inagaki 52'; Nakayama (yellow card) 90'; Morishima 90+4'	Report	Hilu (yellow card) 68'	Stadium: Toyota Stadium; Attendance: 30,529; Referee: Keigo Sendachi

4 October 2024 33	Avispa Fukuoka	1–0	Nagoya Grampus	Fukuoka
19:04 JST (UTC+9)	Oda 88'	Report	Izumi (yellow card) 90+1'; Mikuni (yellow card) 90+2'	Stadium: Best Denki Stadium; Attendance: 7,670; Referee: Hayato Shimizu

19 October 2024 34	Nagoya Grampus	0–2	Hokkaido Consadole Sapporo	Toyota
14:03 JST (UTC+9)	Mikuni (yellow card) 37' (yellow-red card) 83'; Tokumoto (yellow card) 53'	Report	Park (yellow card) 22'; Komai 35'; Suzuki 88'	Stadium: Toyota Stadium; Attendance: 33,587; Referee: Atsushi Kamimura

23 October 2024 35	Gamba Osaka	3–2	Nagoya Grampus	Osaka
19:03 JST (UTC+9)	Sakamoto 21', 28'; Fukuda 78'	Report	Ha 5'; Yoshida 56'	Stadium: Suita City Football Stadium; Attendance: 16,021; Referee: Takuto Okabe

9 November 2024 36	Kashima Antlers	0–0	Nagoya Grampus	Kashima
14:00 JST (UTC+9)	Suzuki (red card) 58'	Report	Morishima (yellow card) 52'; Shiihashi (yellow card) 57'	Stadium: Kashima Soccer Stadium; Attendance: 22,945; Referee: Masuya Ueda

30 November 2024 37	Nagoya Grampus	0–3	Sagan Tosu	Gifu
14:03 JST (UTC+9)		Report	Slivka 8'; Nakahara 10', 67'; Maruhashi (yellow card) 26'	Stadium: Gifu Nagaragawa Stadium; Attendance: 14,734; Referee: Koji Takasaki

8 December 2024 38	Yokohama F. Marinos	0–2	Nagoya Grampus	Yokohama
14:00 JST (UTC+9)	Nishimura (yellow card) 64'	Report	Izumi 24'; Yamagishi 71'	Stadium: Nissan Stadium; Attendance: 42,866; Referee: Ryo Tanimoto

=== Emperor's Cup ===
12 June 2024 Second Round	Nagoya Grampus	0–1	Japan Soccer College	Toyota
18:30 JST (UTC+9)	Shiihashi (yellow card) 86'	Report	Ishibashi (yellow card) 4'; Uemoto 51'; Kuramochi (yellow card) 90+6'	Stadium: Toyota Stadium; Attendance: 3,178; Referee: Koji Takasaki

=== J.League Cup ===
17 April 2024 Round 2	Omiya Ardija	0–2	Nagoya Grampus	Saitama
19:03 JST (UTC+9)	Takayanagi (yellow card) 27'; Katō (yellow card) 53'; Shimizu (yellow card) 59'	Report	Uchida (yellow card) 44'; Patric 45+1', 54' (pen.)	Stadium: NACK5 Stadium Omiya; Attendance: 5,467; Referee: Naoto Uehara

22 May 2024 Round 3	Yokohama FC	1–3	Nagoya Grampus	Yokohama
19:03 JST (UTC+9)	Ogura 44'	Report	Nagai 5'; Nogami 7'; Yoshida (yellow card) 30' (goal) 63'	Stadium: NHK Spring Mitsuzawa Football Stadium; Attendance: 3,423; Referee: Hayato Shimizu

5 June 2024 Playoff round 1st leg	Kashiwa Reysol	1–1	Nagoya Grampus	Kashiwa
19:03 JST (UTC+9)	Takamine 72'; Toshima (yellow card) 88'	Report	Yamagishi 15'; Inagaki (yellow card) 86'	Stadium: Sankyo Frontier Kashiwa Stadium; Attendance: 4,372; Referee: Koichiro Fukushima

5 June 2024 Playoff round 1st leg	Nagoya Grampus	1–0 (2–1 agg.)	Kashiwa Reysol	Toyota
16:03 JST (UTC+9)	Mikuni (yellow card) 4'; Nakayama 33'	Report	Shirai (yellow card) 7'	Stadium: Toyota Stadium; Attendance: 11,093; Referee: Futoshi Nakamura

4 September 2024 Quarterfinal 1st leg	Nagoya Grampus	0–1	Sanfrecce Hiroshima	Toyota
19:03 JST (UTC+9)	Kawazura (yellow card) 67'; Mikuni (yellow card) 90+3'	Report	Mitsuta (yellow card) 17'; Arslan 58'; Shiotani (yellow card) 77'	Stadium: Toyota Stadium; Referee: Hiroki Kasahara

8 September 2024 Quarterfinal 2nd leg	Sanfrecce Hiroshima	1–2 (a.e.t.) (2–2 agg.) (3–5 p)	Nagoya Grampus	Hiroshima
19:33 JST (UTC+9)	T.Matsumoto (yellow card) 10'; Higashi 102'		Patric 9'; Uchida (yellow card) 17'; Koshimichi 112' (o.g.)	Stadium: Edion Peace Wing Hiroshima
	Penalties
	Paciência (penalty missed); Mitsuta (penalty missed); Nakajima (penalty scored); T.Matsumoto (penalty missed)		(penalty scored) Inagaki; (penalty scored) Langerak; (penalty scored) Morishima

9 October 2024 Semifinal 1st leg	Yokohama F. Marinos	1–3	Nagoya Grampus	Yokohama
19:03 JST (UTC+9)	Anderson Lopes 31' (yellow card) 71'; Watanabe (yellow card) 36'	Report	Shiihashi 3'; Mikuni 15'; Nagai (yellow card) 58'; Yamagishi 76'	Stadium: Nissan Stadium; Attendance: 10,529; Referee: Futoshi Nakamura

13 October 2024 Semifinal 2nd leg	Nagoya Grampus	1–2 (4–3 agg.)	Yokohama F. Marinos	Toyota
15:03 JST (UTC+9)	Nakayama (yellow card) 29'; Yamagishi 46'; Nogami (yellow card) 58'	Report	Nishimura 33'; Uenaka 82' (yellow card) 90+3'; Inoue (yellow card) 88'; Yan (yellow card) 90+6'	Stadium: Toyota Stadium; Attendance: 29,081; Referee: Yuichi Nishimura

2 November 2024 Final	Nagoya Grampus	3–3 (5–4 p)	Albirex Niigata	Tokyo
13:09 JST (UTC+9)	Nagai 31', 42'; Nakayama 93'	Report	Taniguchi 71'; Komi 90+11', 111'	Stadium: Japan National Stadium; Attendance: 62,517; Referee: Koichiro Fukushima
	Penalties
	Inagaki (penalty scored); Langerak (penalty scored); Yamanaka (penalty scored); Junker (penalty scored); Yamagishi (penalty scored)		(penalty scored) Akiyama; (penalty missed) Nagakura; (penalty scored) Deng; (penalty scored) Hoshi; (penalty scored) Komi

== Squad statistics ==
As of match played 8 December 2024

=== Appearances and goals ===
No.	Pos	Nat	Player	Total		J1 League		Emperor's Cup		J.League Cup	
No.	Pos	Nat	Player	Apps	Goals	Apps	Goals	Apps	Goals	Apps	Goals
1	GK	(Australia) AUS	Mitchell Langerak	41	0	35	0	0	0	6	0
2	DF	(Japan) JPN	Yuki Nogami	35	2	20+6	1	0	0	9	1
3	DF	(South Korea) KOR	Ha Chang-rae	27	3	20+4	3	0+1	0	0+2	0
4	DF	(Japan) JPN	Shion Inoue	4	0	1+1	0	1	0	1	0
5	MF	(Japan) JPN	Haruki Yoshida	20	2	7+9	1	1	0	2+1	1
7	MF	(Japan) JPN	Ryuji Izumi	36	3	24+6	3	0	0	5+1	0
8	MF	(Japan) JPN	Keiya Shiihashi	44	2	28+6	1	1	0	8+1	1
10	FW	(Brazil) BRA	Patric	40	8	13+23	5	0+1	0	2+1	3
11	FW	(Japan) JPN	Yuya Yamagishi	31	5	18+5	2	0+1	0	2+5	3
14	MF	(Japan) JPN	Tsukasa Morishima	45	3	36+1	3	0+1	0	6+1	0
15	MF	(Japan) JPN	Sho Inagaki	44	6	35+1	6	0	0	7+1	0
16	GK	(Japan) JPN	Yohei Takeda	6	0	3	0	1	0	2	0
17	MF	(Japan) JPN	Ken Masui	30	2	9+16	2	1	0	1+3	0
18	FW	(Japan) JPN	Kensuke Nagai	40	9	26+6	6	0	0	6+2	3
19	MF	(Japan) JPN	Takuya Shigehiro	4	0	0+4	0	0	0	0	0
20	DF	(Japan) JPN	KennedyEgbus Mikuni	44	3	35	2	1	0	7+1	1
24	DF	(Japan) JPN	Akinari Kawazura	31	0	23+2	0	0	0	6	0
27	MF	(Japan) JPN	Katsuhiro Nakayama	42	2	17+15	0	0+1	0	3+6	2
28	FW	(Japan) JPN	Kyota Sakakibara	10	0	1+6	0	0	0	3	0
32	MF	(Japan) JPN	Haruto Suzuki	2	0	0	0	1	0	0+1	0
33	MF	(Japan) JPN	Taichi Kikuchi	17	1	4+8	1	0	0	0+5	0
34	MF	(Japan) JPN	Takuya Uchida	38	0	23+6	0	0+1	0	8	0
35	GK	(Japan) JPN	Alexandre Pisano	1	0	0	0	0	0	1	0
41	MF	(Japan) JPN	Masahito Ono	6	0	2+3	0	0	0	0+1	0
45	MF	(Ecuador) ECU	José Carabalí	1	0	0	0	0	0	0+1	0
55	DF	(Japan) JPN	Shuhei Tokumoto	15	0	8+2	0	0	0	4+1	0
66	DF	(Japan) JPN	Ryosuke Yamanaka	25	1	10+11	1	0	0	3+1	0
77	FW	(Denmark) DEN	Kasper Junker	24	4	7+12	4	0	0	3+2	0
Players away on loan:
6	MF	(Japan) JPN	Takuji Yonemoto	15	0	9+4	0	0	0	2	0
9	FW	(Japan) JPN	Noriyoshi Sakai	5	0	0+3	0	1	0	0+1	0
25	MF	(Japan) JPN	Tojiro Kubo	17	1	6+7	1	1	0	2+1	0
30	DF	(Japan) JPN	Ei Gyotoku	1	0	0	0	1	0	0	0
Players who left Nagoya Grampus during the season:
21	MF	(Brazil) BRA	Thales Paula	2	0	0	0	1	0	0+1	0
22	MF	(Japan) JPN	Yuki Soma	1	1	1	1	0	0	0	0

=== Goalscorers ===
Place	Position	Nation	Number	Name	J1 League	Emperor's Cup	J.League Cup	Total
1	FW	(Japan)	18	Kensuke Nagai	6	0	3	9
2	FW	(Brazil)	10	Patric	5	0	3	8
3	MF	(Japan)	15	Sho Inagaki	6	0	0	6
4	FW	(Japan)	11	Yuya Yamagishi	2	0	3	5
5	FW	(Denmark)	77	Kasper Junker	4	0	0	4
6	MF	(Japan)	14	Tsukasa Morishima	3	0	0	3
6	DF	(South Korea)	3	Ha Chang-rae	3	0	0	3
6	MF	(Japan)	7	Ryuji Izumi	3	0	0	3
6	DF	(Japan)	20	KennedyEgbus Mikuni	2	0	1	3
10	MF	(Japan)	17	Ken Masui	2	0	0	2
10	DF	(Japan)	2	Yuki Nogami	1	0	1	2
10	MF	(Japan)	8	Keiya Shiihashi	1	0	1	2
10	MF	(Japan)	5	Haruki Yoshida	1	0	1	2
10	MF	(Japan)	27	Katsuhiro Nakayama	0	0	2	2
10				Own goal	1	0	1	2
16	MF	(Japan)	66	Ryosuke Yamanaka	1	0	0	1
16	MF	(Japan)	25	Tojiro Kubo	1	0	0	1
16	MF	(Japan)	22	Yuki Soma	1	0	0	1
16	MF	(Japan)	33	Taichi Kikuchi	1	0	0	1
				TOTALS	44	0	16	60

=== Clean sheets ===
Place	Position	Nation	Number	Name	J1 League	Emperor's Cup	J.League Cup	Total
1	GK	(Australia)	1	Mitchell Langerak	7	0	1	8
2	GK	(Japan)	16	Yohei Takeda	3	0	0	3
3	GK	(Japan)	35	Alexandre Pisano	0	0	1	1
TOTALS					10	0	2	12

=== Disciplinary record ===
Number	Nation	Position	Name	J1 League		Emperor's Cup		J.League Cup		Total	
Number	Nation	Position	Name	Booked	Sent off (straight red)	Booked	Sent off (straight red)	Booked	Sent off (straight red)	Booked	Sent off (straight red)
1	(Australia)	GK	Mitchell Langerak	1	0	0	0	0	0	1	0
2	(Japan)	DF	Yuki Nogami	2	0	0	0	1	0	3	0
3	(South Korea)	DF	Ha Chang-rae	7	0	0	0	0	0	7	0
5	(Japan)	MF	Haruki Yoshida	3	0	0	0	1	0	4	0
7	(Japan)	MF	Ryuji Izumi	5	0	0	0	0	0	5	0
8	(Japan)	MF	Keiya Shiihashi	5	0	1	0	0	0	6	0
10	(Brazil)	FW	Patric	2	0	0	0	0	0	2	0
14	(Japan)	MF	Tsukasa Morishima	5	0	0	0	0	0	5	0
15	(Japan)	MF	Sho Inagaki	1	0	0	0	1	0	2	0
17	(Japan)	MF	Ken Masui	1	1	0	0	0	0	1	1
18	(Japan)	FW	Kensuke Nagai	2	0	0	0	1	0	3	0
19	(Japan)	MF	Takuya Shigehiro	1	0	0	0	0	0	1	0
20	(Japan)	DF	KennedyEgbus Mikuni	7	1	0	0	2	0	9	1
24	(Japan)	DF	Akinari Kawazura	1	0	0	0	1	0	2	0
27	(Japan)	MF	Katsuhiro Nakayama	2	0	0	0	1	0	3	0
34	(Japan)	MF	Takuya Uchida	5	2	0	0	2	0	7	2
55	(Japan)	DF	Shuhei Tokumoto	2	0	0	0	0	0	2	0
77	(Denmark)	FW	Kasper Junker	1	0	0	0	0	0	1	0
Players away on loan:
6	(Japan)	MF	Takuji Yonemoto	1	1	0	0	0	0	1	1
25	(Japan)	MF	Tojiro Kubo	2	0	0	0	0	0	2	0
Players who left Nagoya Grampus during the season:
22	(Japan)	MF	Yuki Soma	1	0	0	0	0	0	1	0
			TOTALS	57	5	1	0	10	0	68	5
