= 2023 J.League Cup =

2023 JリーグYBCルヴァンカップ

Tournament details
- Country: Japan
- Dates: 8 March – 4 November
- Teams: 20

Final positions
- Champions: Avispa Fukuoka (1st title)
- Runners-up: Urawa Red Diamonds

Tournament statistics
- Matches played: 73
- Goals scored: 190 (2.6 per match)
- Attendance: 677,347 (9,279 per match)
- Top goal scorer(s): Noriyoshi Sakai; Asahi Uenaka (4 goals each)

The 2023 J.League Cup, known as the 2023 J.League YBC Levain Cup (Japanese: 2023 JリーグYBCルヴァンカップ) for sponsorship reasons, was the 31st edition of J.League Cup, a Japanese association football cup competition. Unlike previous editions, the competition did not use the away goals rule. No byes awarded for the knockout stage and thus no knockout round playoffs.

Sanfrecce Hiroshima were the defending champions, having beaten Cerezo Osaka 2–1 in the 2022 final to win their first J.League Cup title. They were unable to defend their title after their elimination in the group stage.

Avispa Fukuoka won their first ever major trophy by defeating two-time winners Urawa Red Diamonds in the final. They became the third consecutive new winners of the tournament, following Nagoya Grampus in 2021 and Sanfrecce Hiroshima in 2022.

== Format ==
All 18 teams in the 2023 J1 League participated as well as the top two relegated teams from the 2022 season. Different from the previous editions, no teams were awarded bye or a direct qualification for the knockout stage. The change was made due to AFC Champions League's calendar shift, as it adopted the spring-autumn season format from 2023 and got rid of the year-round format, thus having the 2023–24 group stage played from September 2023.

Twenty teams played in the group stage, divided into five groups of four teams, allocated in each group by their finish on the 2022 J1 and J2 Leagues. Each group winners and the three best-placed runners-up qualified to the quarter-finals.

This was the last edition to feature a group stage like the Scottish League Cup and Taça da Liga. From 2024, it would be held as a single knockout competition like the EFL Cup and would see all clubs from the season's J1, J2, and J3 Leagues participate, thus including the clubs from all J.League divisions for the first time since 2001.

== Qualified teams ==
League	Team	Final 2022 rank
2022 J1	Yokohama F. Marinos	1st
2022 J1	Kawasaki Frontale	2nd
2022 J1	Sanfrecce Hiroshima	3rd
2022 J1	Kashima Antlers	4th
2022 J1	Cerezo Osaka	5th
2022 J1	FC Tokyo	6th
2022 J1	Kashiwa Reysol	7th
2022 J1	Nagoya Grampus	8th
2022 J1	Urawa Red Diamonds	9th
2022 J1	Hokkaido Consadole Sapporo	10th
2022 J1	Sagan Tosu	11th
2022 J1	Shonan Bellmare	12nd
2022 J1	Vissel Kobe	13rd
2022 J1	Avispa Fukuoka	14th
2022 J1	Gamba Osaka	15th
2022 J1	Kyoto Sanga	16th
2022 J1	Shimizu S-Pulse (2023 J2)	17th
2022 J1	Júbilo Iwata (2023 J2)	18th
2022 J2	Albirex Niigata (2023 J1)	1st
2022 J2	Yokohama FC (2023 J1)	2nd

== Schedule ==
The schedule was confirmed along with the holding method of the competition on 20 December 2022.

Stage	Round	Date
Group stage	Matchday 1	8 March 2023
Group stage	Matchday 2	25–26 March 2023
Group stage	Matchday 3	5 April 2023
Group stage	Matchday 4	19 April 2023
Group stage	Matchday 5	24 May 2023
Group stage	Matchday 6	18 June 2023
Knockout stage
Knockout stage	Quarter-finals	6 September 2023 (first leg); 10 September 2023 (second leg)
Knockout stage	Semi-finals	11 October 2023 (first leg); 15 October 2023 (second leg)
Knockout stage	Final	4 November 2023

== Group stage ==
Each group had its matches played on a home-and-away round-robin basis. Each match lasted 90 minutes. Each team played six times, twice against each opponent at home and away.

=== Tiebreakers ===
In the group stage, teams in a group were ranked by points (3 points for a win, 1 point for a draw, 0 points for a loss). If the points were tied, the following tiebreakers were applied accordingly:

1. Points in head-to-head matches among tied teams;
2. Goal difference in head-to-head matches among tied teams;
3. Goals scored in head-to-head matches among tied teams;

If more than two teams were tied, and applying all head-to-head criteria above remains a part of teams still tied, reapply the criteria above only for the tied teams.

1. Goal difference in all group matches;
2. Goals scored in all group matches;
3. Penalty shoot-out if only two teams were tied and they met in the sixth match of the group;
4. Fewer disciplinary points;
5. Drawing of lots.

=== Group A ===
Pos	Team	Pld	W	D	L	GF	GA	GD	Pts	Qualification
1	Yokohama F. Marinos	6	5	0	1	14	5	+9	15	Advance to knockout stage
2	Hokkaido Consadole Sapporo	6	3	1	2	13	10	+3	10	Advance to knockout stage
3	Júbilo Iwata	6	2	0	4	8	9	−1	6	
4	Sagan Tosu	6	1	1	4	4	15	−11	4	

Source: JLeague.co (EN), JLeague.jp (JA)
Rules for classification: Tiebreakers

8 March 2023	Yokohama F. Marinos	1–0	Júbilo Iwata	Yokohama
19:03	Suzuki 49' (o.g.)	JLeague.co (EN); JLeague.jp (JA)		Stadium: Nippatsu Mitsuzawa Stadium; Attendance: 7,077; Referee: Yoshiro Imamura

8 March 2023	Sagan Tosu	0–0	Hokkaido Consadole Sapporo	Tosu
19:04		JLeague.co (EN); JLeague.jp (JA)		Stadium: Ekimae Real Estate Stadium; Attendance: 4,002; Referee: Jumpei Iida

25 March 2023	Júbilo Iwata	2–3	Hokkaido Consadole Sapporo	Iwata
14:03	Fujiwara 67'; Ogawa 73'	JLeague.co (EN); JLeague.jp (JA)	Tanaka 50'; Kaneko 56'; Tučić 90+8'	Stadium: Yamaha Stadium; Attendance: 4,658; Referee: Shu Kawamata

26 March 2023	Sagan Tosu	0–2	Yokohama F. Marinos	Tosu
15:04		JLeague.co (EN); JLeague.jp (JA)	Uenaka 79'; Yoshio 86'	Stadium: Ekimae Real Estate Stadium; Attendance: 6,615; Referee: Yuichi Nishimura

5 April 2023	Yokohama F. Marinos	2–1	Hokkaido Consadole Sapporo	Yokohama
19:03	Marcos Júnior 10'; Nishi 26' (o.g.)	JLeague.co (EN); JLeague.jp (JA)	Nakashima 6'	Stadium: Nippatsu Mitsuzawa Stadium; Attendance: 6,269; Referee: Takuto Okabe

5 April 2023	Júbilo Iwata	1–2	Sagan Tosu	Iwata
19:03	Ogawa 81'	JLeague.co (EN); JLeague.jp (JA)	Akumu 6'; Kabayama 86'	Stadium: Yamaha Stadium; Attendance: 2,769; Referee: Hiroyuki Kimura

19 April 2023	Hokkaido Consadole Sapporo	4–1	Sagan Tosu	Sapporo
19:03	Supachok 8', 53'; Suga 57'; Tučić 83'	JLeague.co (EN); JLeague.jp (JA)	Ono 23'	Stadium: Sapporo Dome; Attendance: 4,439; Referee: Futoshi Nakamura

19 April 2023	Júbilo Iwata	0–1	Yokohama F. Marinos	Iwata
19:03		JLeague.co (EN); JLeague.jp (JA)	Yan 7'	Stadium: Yamaha Stadium; Attendance: 3,526; Referee: Koei Koya

24 May 2023	Hokkaido Consadole Sapporo	3–2	Yokohama F. Marinos	Sapporo
19:03	Fernandes 57'; Tučić 65'; Aoki 84'	JLeague.co (EN); JLeague.jp (JA)	Matsubara 49'; Sakakibara 76'	Stadium: Sapporo Dome; Attendance: 5,923; Referee: Ryo Tanimoto

24 May 2023	Sagan Tosu	0–2	Júbilo Iwata	Tosu
19:04		JLeague.co (EN); JLeague.jp (JA)	González 32'; Kaneko 76'	Stadium: Ekimae Real Estate Stadium; Attendance: 3,753; Referee: Hajime Matsuo

18 June 2023	Hokkaido Consadole Sapporo	2–3	Júbilo Iwata	Sapporo
18:03	Fernandes 2'; Fukai 73'	JLeague.co (EN); JLeague.jp (JA)	Yamamoto 73'; Nakagawa 73'; Furukawa 73'	Stadium: Sapporo Dome; Attendance: 10,146; Referee: Hayato Shimizu

18 June 2023	Yokohama F. Marinos	6–1	Sagan Tosu	Yokohama
18:03	Nishimura 24' (pen.), 49'; Miyaichi 67'; Uenaka 68', 89'; Yoshio 72'	JLeague.co (EN); JLeague.jp (JA)	Suzuki 90+3'	Stadium: Nippatsu Mitsuzawa Stadium; Attendance: 6,939; Referee: Koji Takasaki

=== Group B ===
Pos	Team	Pld	W	D	L	GF	GA	GD	Pts	Qualification
1	Urawa Red Diamonds	6	1	5	0	5	4	+1	8 (Note: Head-to-head points: Urawa Red Diamonds 6, Shimizu S-Pulse 5, Kawasaki Frontale 4.)	Advance to knockout stage
2	Shimizu S-Pulse	6	2	2	2	8	15	−7	8	
3	Kawasaki Frontale	6	2	2	2	12	7	+5	8	
4	Shonan Bellmare	6	1	3	2	8	7	+1	6	

Source: JLeague.co (EN), JLeague.jp (JA)
Rules for classification: Tiebreakers
Notes:

8 March 2023	Shonan Bellmare	0–0	Urawa Red Diamonds	Hiratsuka
19:03		JLeague.co (EN); JLeague.jp (JA)		Stadium: Lemon Gas Stadium Hiratsuka; Attendance: 8,856; Referee: Futoshi Nakamura

8 March 2023	Shimizu S-Pulse	3–2	Kawasaki Frontale	Shizuoka
19:03	Oh Se-hun 6'; Shirasaki 7'; Nakayama 70'	JLeague.co (EN); JLeague.jp (JA)	Chanathip 67'; Miyashiro 82' (pen.)	Stadium: IAI Stadium Nihondaira; Attendance: 6,900; Referee: Shu Kawamata

26 March 2023	Urawa Red Diamonds	1–1	Shimizu S-Pulse	Saitama
15:03	Linssen 38'	JLeague.co (EN); JLeague.jp (JA)	Kololli 71'	Stadium: Urawa Komaba Stadium; Attendance: 10,125; Referee: Koei Koya

26 March 2023	Kawasaki Frontale	0–0	Shonan Bellmare	Kawasaki
15:03		JLeague.co (EN); JLeague.jp (JA)		Stadium: Kawasaki Todoroki Stadium; Attendance: 14,967; Referee: Thomas Bramall

5 April 2023	Kawasaki Frontale	0–0	Urawa Red Diamonds	Kawasaki
19:03		JLeague.co (EN); JLeague.jp (JA)		Stadium: Kawasaki Todoroki Stadium; Attendance: 18,332; Referee: Shu Kawamata

5 April 2023	Shonan Bellmare	3–0	Shimizu S-Pulse	Hiratsuka
19:03	Suzuki 21'; Yamada 40', 51'	JLeague.co (EN); JLeague.jp (JA)		Stadium: Lemon Gas Stadium Hiratsuka; Attendance: 7,204; Referee: Takafumi Mikuriya

19 April 2023	Kawasaki Frontale	6–0	Shimizu S-Pulse	Kawasaki
19:03	Tono 13', 16'; Kurumaya 58'; Seko 69'; Wakizaka 84', 89'	JLeague.co (EN); JLeague.jp (JA)		Stadium: Kawasaki Todoroki Stadium; Attendance: 15,081; Referee: Keigo Sendachi

19 April 2023	Urawa Red Diamonds	1–1	Shonan Bellmare	Saitama
19:33	Hayakawa 43'	JLeague.co (EN); JLeague.jp (JA)	Yamada 3'	Stadium: Saitama Stadium 2002; Attendance: 11,222; Referee: Hiroki Kasahara

24 May 2023	Shimizu S-Pulse	3–2	Shonan Bellmare	Shizuoka
19:03	Kishimoto 28'; Kololli 42'; Thiago Santana 81'	JLeague.co (EN); JLeague.jp (JA)	Suzuki 64'; Hiraoka 67'	Stadium: IAI Stadium Nihondaira; Attendance: 4,574; Referee: Koji Takasaki

24 May 2023	Urawa Red Diamonds	2–1	Kawasaki Frontale	Saitama
19:33	Kanté 51'; Schmidt 89' (o.g.)	JLeague.co (EN); JLeague.jp (JA)	Segawa 3'	Stadium: Saitama Stadium 2002; Attendance: 12,366; Referee: Yoshimi Yamashita

18 June 2023	Shonan Bellmare	2–3	Kawasaki Frontale	Hiratsuka
18:03	Ohashi 6', 59'	JLeague.co (EN); JLeague.jp (JA)	Seko 73'; Yamada 88'; Tono 90+4'	Stadium: Lemon Gas Stadium Hiratsuka; Attendance: 10,374; Referee: Koei Koya

18 June 2023	Shimizu S-Pulse	1–1	Urawa Red Diamonds	Shizuoka
18:03	Kitagawa 33'	JLeague.co (EN); JLeague.jp (JA)	Akimoto 49'	Stadium: IAI Stadium Nihondaira; Attendance: 10,229; Referee: Koichiro Fukushima

=== Group C ===
Pos	Team	Pld	W	D	L	GF	GA	GD	Pts	Qualification
1	Nagoya Grampus	6	5	0	1	11	5	+6	15	Advance to knockout stage
2	Sanfrecce Hiroshima	6	3	0	3	12	7	+5	9	
3	Yokohama FC	6	2	0	4	7	10	−3	6 (Note: Head-to-head points: Yokohama FC 3, Vissel Kobe 3. Head-to-head goal differences: Yokohama FC +1, Vissel Kobe –1.)	
4	Vissel Kobe	6	2	0	4	4	12	−8	6	

Source: JLeague.co (EN), JLeague.jp (JA)
Rules for classification: Tiebreakers
Notes:

8 March 2023	Vissel Kobe	0–2	Nagoya Grampus	Kobe
19:03		JLeague.co (EN); JLeague.jp (JA)	Sakai 23', 75'	Stadium: Noevir Stadium Kobe; Attendance: 4,084; Referee: Yusuke Araki

8 March 2023	Sanfrecce Hiroshima	3–1	Yokohama FC	Hiroshima
19:03	Mitsuta 75'; Sasaki 80'; Sugita 88' (o.g.)	JLeague.co (EN); JLeague.jp (JA)	Caprini 59'	Stadium: Edion Stadium Hiroshima; Attendance: 5,249; Referee: Tetsuro Yoshida

26 March 2023	Yokohama FC	0–1	Vissel Kobe	Yokohama
14:03		JLeague.co (EN); JLeague.jp (JA)	Osako 85'	Stadium: Nippatsu Mitsuzawa Stadium; Attendance: 3,813; Referee: Yoshiro Imamura

26 March 2023	Sanfrecce Hiroshima	1–2	Nagoya Grampus	Hiroshima
14:03	Kawamura 29'	JLeague.co (EN); JLeague.jp (JA)	Morishita 61'; Nagai 63'	Stadium: Edion Stadium Hiroshima; Attendance: 8,807; Referee: Hiroyuki Kimura

5 April 2023	Vissel Kobe	0–5	Sanfrecce Hiroshima	Kobe
19:03		JLeague.co (EN); JLeague.jp (JA)	Sasaki 31'; Mitsuta 53', 70'; Kawamura 60'; Yamasaki 87'	Stadium: Noevir Stadium Kobe; Attendance: 4,434; Referee: Koei Koya

5 April 2023	Nagoya Grampus	3–2	Yokohama FC	Nagoya
19:33	Sakai 45+1', 90'; Nagai 78'	JLeague.co (EN); JLeague.jp (JA)	Nakamura 28'; Ito 42'	Stadium: Toyota Stadium; Attendance: 6,465; Referee: Atsushi Kamimura

19 April 2023	Yokohama FC	0–2	Nagoya Grampus	Yokohama
19:03		JLeague.co (EN); JLeague.jp (JA)	Kida 41', 52'	Stadium: Nippatsu Mitsuzawa Stadium; Attendance: 2,818; Referee: Akihiko Ikeuchi

19 April 2023	Sanfrecce Hiroshima	2–1	Vissel Kobe	Hiroshima
19:03	Sasaki 73'; Nakano 82'	JLeague.co (EN); JLeague.jp (JA)	Lincoln 69' (pen.)	Stadium: Edion Stadium Hiroshima; Attendance: 5,877; Referee: Jumpei Iida

24 May 2023	Yokohama FC	1–0	Sanfrecce Hiroshima	Yokohama
19:03	Lara 29'	JLeague.co (EN); JLeague.jp (JA)		Stadium: Nippatsu Mitsuzawa Stadium; Attendance: 2,754; Referee: Hiroyuki Kimura

24 May 2023	Nagoya Grampus	0–1	Vissel Kobe	Nagoya
19:33		JLeague.co (EN); JLeague.jp (JA)	Lincoln 64'	Stadium: Toyota Stadium; Attendance: 6,266; Referee: Masuya Ueda

18 June 2023	Nagoya Grampus	2–1	Sanfrecce Hiroshima	Nagoya
18:03	Izumi 37'; Ishida 37'	JLeague.co (EN); JLeague.jp (JA)	Shibasaki 80'	Stadium: Toyota Stadium; Attendance: 7,806; Referee: Futoshi Nakamura

18 June 2023	Vissel Kobe	1–3	Yokohama FC	Kobe
18:03	Jean Patric 8'	JLeague.co (EN); JLeague.jp (JA)	Yamashita 20', 30'; Marcelo Ryan 73'	Stadium: Noevir Stadium Kobe; Attendance: 5,430; Referee: Yusuke Araki

=== Group D ===
Pos	Team	Pld	W	D	L	GF	GA	GD	Pts	Qualification
1	Avispa Fukuoka	6	4	1	1	9	6	+3	13	Advance to knockout stage
2	Kashima Antlers	6	3	1	2	6	4	+2	10	Advance to knockout stage
3	Albirex Niigata	6	2	0	4	6	8	−2	6	
4	Kashiwa Reysol	6	1	2	3	7	10	−3	5	

Source: JLeague.co (EN), JLeague.jp (JA)
Rules for classification: Tiebreakers

8 March 2023	Kashiwa Reysol	1–1	Kashima Antlers	Kashiwa
19:03	Hosoya 90'	JLeague.co (EN); JLeague.jp (JA)	Matsumura 22'	Stadium: Sankyo Frontier Kashiwa Stadium; Attendance: 6,674; Referee: Takuto Okabe

8 March 2023	Avispa Fukuoka	1–0	Albirex Niigata	Fukuoka
19:03	Tsuruno 59'	JLeague.co (EN); JLeague.jp (JA)		Stadium: Best Denki Stadium; Attendance: 3,092; Referee: Hayato Shimizu

26 March 2023	Albirex Niigata	1–0	Kashima Antlers	Niigata
14:03	Akiyama 52'	JLeague.co (EN); JLeague.jp (JA)		Stadium: Denka Big Swan Stadium; Attendance: 12,294; Referee: Yoshimi Yamashita

26 March 2023	Avispa Fukuoka	3–3	Kashiwa Reysol	Fukuoka
15:03	Yamagishi 29'; Lukian 79'; Yuzawa 90'	JLeague.co (EN); JLeague.jp (JA)	Tsuchiya 13'; Grot 16', 67'	Stadium: Best Denki Stadium; Attendance: 3,611; Referee: Kazuyoshi Enomoto

5 April 2023	Kashima Antlers	1–0	Avispa Fukuoka	Kashima
19:03	Araki 32'	JLeague.co (EN); JLeague.jp (JA)		Stadium: Kashima Soccer Stadium; Attendance: 5,571; Referee: Hayato Shimizu

5 April 2023	Albirex Niigata	2–0	Kashiwa Reysol	Niigata
19:03	Matsuda 6'; Komi 16'	JLeague.co (EN); JLeague.jp (JA)		Stadium: Denka Big Swan Stadium; Attendance: 8,081; Referee: Yuichi Nishimura

19 April 2023	Kashiwa Reysol	3–2	Albirex Niigata	Kashiwa
19:03	Muto 17'; Hosoya 47'; Yamada 53'	JLeague.co (EN); JLeague.jp (JA)	Matsuda 22'; Taniguchi 29'	Stadium: Sankyo Frontier Kashiwa Stadium; Attendance: 4,650; Referee: Shu Kawamata

19 April 2023	Avispa Fukuoka	2–1	Kashima Antlers	Fukuoka
19:03	Jogo 14'; Wellington 90+3'	JLeague.co (EN); JLeague.jp (JA)	Arthur 31'	Stadium: Best Denki Stadium; Attendance: 3,520; Referee: Masuya Ueda

24 May 2023	Kashima Antlers	1–0	Kashiwa Reysol	Kashima
19:10	Arthur 68'	JLeague.co (EN); JLeague.jp (JA)		Stadium: Kashima Soccer Stadium; Attendance: 6,134; Referee: Yuichi Nishimura

24 May 2023	Albirex Niigata	1–2	Avispa Fukuoka	Niigata
19:03	Gustavo 4'	JLeague.co (EN); JLeague.jp (JA)	Tsuruno 77'; Oda 86'	Stadium: Denka Big Swan Stadium; Attendance: 7,879; Referee: Takuto Okabe

18 June 2023	Kashima Antlers	2–0	Albirex Niigata	Kashima
18:03	Nakama 3'; Someno 12'	JLeague.co (EN); JLeague.jp (JA)		Stadium: Kashima Soccer Stadium; Attendance: 9,652; Referee: Akihiko Ikeuchi

18 June 2023	Kashiwa Reysol	0–1	Avispa Fukuoka	Kashiwa
18:03		JLeague.co (EN); JLeague.jp (JA)	Wellington 12'	Stadium: Sankyo Frontier Kashiwa Stadium; Attendance: 4,986; Referee: Hajime Matsuo

=== Group E ===
Pos	Team	Pld	W	D	L	GF	GA	GD	Pts	Qualification
1	Gamba Osaka	6	3	1	2	8	4	+4	10 (Note: Head-to-head points: Gamba Osaka 3, FC Tokyo 3. Head-to-head goal differences: Gamba Osaka +2, FC Tokyo –2.)	Advance to knockout stage
2	FC Tokyo	6	3	1	2	9	5	+4	10	Advance to knockout stage
3	Kyoto Sanga	6	3	0	3	9	11	−2	9	
4	Cerezo Osaka	6	1	2	3	2	8	−6	5	

Source: JLeague.co (EN), JLeague.jp (JA)
Rules for classification: Tiebreakers
Notes:

8 March 2023	Kyoto Sanga	1–3	Gamba Osaka	Kameoka
19:03	Yamasaki 34'	JLeague.co (EN); JLeague.jp (JA)	Fukuda 30'; Dawhan 42'; Ishige 79'	Stadium: Sanga Stadium by Kyocera; Attendance: 6,598; Referee: Hirokazu Otsubo

8 March 2023	Cerezo Osaka	1–0	FC Tokyo	Osaka
19:03	Capixaba 86'	JLeague.co (EN); JLeague.jp (JA)		Stadium: Yodoko Sakura Stadium; Attendance: 10,615; Referee: Akihiko Ikeuchi

26 March 2023	FC Tokyo	5–0	Kyoto Sanga	Tokyo
15:03	Perotti 15', 55'; Trevisan 25'; Adaílton 59'; Kumata 75'	JLeague.co (EN); JLeague.jp (JA)		Stadium: Ajinomoto Stadium; Attendance: 8,662; Referee: Takuto Okabe

26 March 2023	Gamba Osaka	1–1	Cerezo Osaka	Suita
15:03	Meshino 90+1'	JLeague.co (EN); JLeague.jp (JA)	Maikuma 52'	Stadium: Panasonic Stadium Suita; Attendance: 26,110; Referee: Hiroki Kasahara

5 April 2023	Kyoto Sanga	4–0	Cerezo Osaka	Kameoka
19:03	Matsuda 6'; Hiraga 8'; Ichimi 21'; Yachida 52'	JLeague.co (EN); JLeague.jp (JA)		Stadium: Sanga Stadium by Kyocera; Attendance: 5,156; Referee: Ryo Tanimoto

5 April 2023	Gamba Osaka	3–0	FC Tokyo	Suita
19:03	Sugiyama 43', 90+1'; Fukuda 87'	JLeague.co (EN); JLeague.jp (JA)		Stadium: Panasonic Stadium Suita; Attendance: 6,757; Referee: Koichiro Fukushima

19 April 2023	FC Tokyo	1–0	Gamba Osaka	Tokyo
19:03	Tsukagawa 74'	JLeague.co (EN); JLeague.jp (JA)		Stadium: Ajinomoto Stadium; Attendance: 8,117; Referee: Takuto Okabe

19 April 2023	Cerezo Osaka	0–2	Kyoto Sanga	Osaka
19:03		JLeague.co (EN); JLeague.jp (JA)	Yamasaki 21'; Yamada 84'	Stadium: Yodoko Sakura Stadium; Attendance: 6,717; Referee: Yudai Yamamoto

24 May 2023	FC Tokyo	0–0	Cerezo Osaka	Tokyo
19:03		JLeague.co (EN); JLeague.jp (JA)		Stadium: Ajinomoto Stadium; Attendance: 8,376; Referee: Shu Kawamata

24 May 2023	Gamba Osaka	0–1	Kyoto Sanga	Suita
19:03		JLeague.co (EN); JLeague.jp (JA)	Kinoshita 19' (pen.)	Stadium: Panasonic Stadium Suita; Attendance: 7,804; Referee: Hiroki Kasahara

18 June 2023	Kyoto Sanga	1–3	FC Tokyo	Kameoka
18:03	Hirato 18'	JLeague.co (EN); JLeague.jp (JA)	Morishige 8'; Nakagawa 26'; Diego Oliveira 26'	Stadium: Sanga Stadium by Kyocera; Attendance: 6,259; Referee: Yoshiro Imamura

18 June 2023	Cerezo Osaka	0–1	Gamba Osaka	Osaka
18:03		JLeague.co (EN); JLeague.jp (JA)	Handa 37'	Stadium: Yodoko Sakura Stadium; Attendance: 18,061; Referee: Hiroyuki Kimura

=== Ranking of runners-up ===
The three best runners-up from the five groups advanced to the knockout stage along with the five group winners.

Pos	Grp	Team	Pld	W	D	L	GF	GA	GD	Pts	Qualification
1	E	FC Tokyo	6	3	1	2	9	5	+4	10	Knockout stage
2	A	Hokkaido Consadole Sapporo	6	3	1	2	13	10	+3	10	Knockout stage
3	D	Kashima Antlers	6	3	1	2	6	4	+2	10	Knockout stage
4	C	Sanfrecce Hiroshima	6	3	0	3	12	7	+5	9	
5	B	Shimizu S-Pulse	6	2	2	2	8	15	−7	8	

Source: JLeague.co (EN), JLeague.jp (JA)
Rules for classification: 1) Goal difference in all group matches; 2) Goals scored in all group matches; 3) Fewer disciplinary points; 4) Drawing of lots.

== Knockout stage ==
In the knockout stage (also called the "Prime Stage" in Japan), which started with the quarter-finals, the matches were played in two legs, except for the final. The aggregate winners of each tie would qualify for the next round. Should in the second leg of either the quarter-final or semi-final the aggregate score was tied, extra-time would have been played. Should the draw stood, penalty shoot-outs would have been played to determine the tie winners. From this season on, the away goals rule would not be applied under any circumstances throughout the entire competition.

The draw to decide the match-ups was held on 3 July 2023 at 12:00 JST.

=== Bracket ===
Quarter-finals

Semi-finals

Final

=== Quarter-finals ===
==== Summary ====
Team 1	Agg.	Team 2	1st leg	2nd leg
Kashima Antlers	2–3	Nagoya Grampus	1–1	1–2 (a.e.t.)
Avispa Fukuoka	2–1	FC Tokyo	0–1	2–0
Urawa Red Diamonds	4–0	Gamba Osaka	1–0	3–0
Yokohama F. Marinos	5–3	Hokkaido Consadole Sapporo	2–3	3–0

==== Matches ====
6 September 2023
19:33

Nagoya Grampus	1–1	Kashima Antlers
Kubo 90+4'	JLeague.co (EN); JLeague.jp (JA)	Matsumura 49'

Toyota Stadium, Toyota
Attendance: 8,089
Referee: Yudai Yamamoto
10 September 2023
18:03

Kashima Antlers	1–2 (a.e.t.)	Nagoya Grampus
Nakama 51'	JLeague.co (EN); JLeague.jp (JA)	Nakashima 3'; Yoshida 119'

Kashima Soccer Stadium, Kashima
Attendance: 14,310
Referee: Yuichi Nishimura

Nagoya Grampus won 3–2 on aggregate.

6 September 2023
19:03

FC Tokyo	1–0	Avispa Fukuoka
Adaílton 16'	JLeague.co (EN); JLeague.jp (JA)

Ajinomoto Stadium, Tokyo
Attendance: 5,565
Referee: Hayato Shimizu
10 September 2023
19:03

Avispa Fukuoka	2–0	FC Tokyo
Yamagishi 38'; Oda 45+3'	JLeague.co (EN); JLeague.jp (JA)

Best Denki Stadium, Fukuoka
Attendance: 8,659
Referee: Yudai Yamamoto

Avispa Fukuoka won 2–1 on aggregate.

6 September 2023
19:03

Gamba Osaka	0–1	Urawa Red Diamonds
	JLeague.co (EN); JLeague.jp (JA)	Schalk 46'

Panasonic Stadium Suita, Suita
Attendance: 9,363
Referee: Takafumi Mikuriya
10 September 2023
19:03

Urawa Red Diamonds	3–0	Gamba Osaka
Linssen 8', 63'; Schalk 86'	JLeague.co (EN); JLeague.jp (JA)

Saitama Stadium 2002, Saitama
Attendance: 21,467
Referee: Koichiro Fukushima

Urawa Red Diamonds won 4–0 on aggregate.

6 September 2023
19:03

Hokkaido Consadole Sapporo	3–2	Yokohama F. Marinos
Okamura 27'; Ogashiwa 74', 90+5'	JLeague.co (EN); JLeague.jp (JA)	Uenaka 8'; Mizunuma 48'

Sapporo Dome, Sapporo
Attendance: 7,566
Referee: Hajime Matsuo
10 September 2023
18:03

Yokohama F. Marinos	3–0	Hokkaido Consadole Sapporo
Mizunuma 32'; Anderson Lopes 48'; Nam Tae-hee 50'	JLeague.co (EN); JLeague.jp (JA)

Nippatsu Mitsuzawa Stadium, Yokohama
Attendance: 10,423
Referee: Jumpei Iida

Yokohama F. Marinos won 5–3 on aggregate.

=== Semi-finals ===
==== Summary ====
Team 1	Agg.	Team 2	1st leg	2nd leg
Nagoya Grampus	0–2	Avispa Fukuoka	0–1	0–1
Urawa Red Diamonds	2–1	Yokohama F. Marinos	0–1	2–0

==== Matches ====
11 October 2023
19:03

Avispa Fukuoka	1–0	Nagoya Grampus
Tsuruno 45+3'	JLeague.co (EN); JLeague.jp (JA)

Best Denki Stadium, Fukuoka
Attendance: 6,980
Referee: Jumpei Iida
15 October 2023
15:03

Nagoya Grampus	0–1	Avispa Fukuoka
	JLeague.co (EN); JLeague.jp (JA)	Wellington 5'

Toyota Stadium, Toyota
Attendance: 24,876
Referee: Yoshiro Imamura

Avispa Fukuoka won 2–0 on aggregate.

11 October 2023
19:03

Yokohama F. Marinos	1–0	Urawa Red Diamonds
Anderson Lopes 61' (pen.)	JLeague.co (EN); JLeague.jp (JA)

Nissan Stadium, Yokohama
Attendance: 13,337
Referee: Akihiko Ikeuchi
15 October 2023
17:03

Urawa Red Diamonds	2–0	Yokohama F. Marinos
Scholz 63' (pen.), 90+1' (pen.)	JLeague.co (EN); JLeague.jp (JA)

Saitama Stadium 2002, Saitama
Attendance: 29,504
Referee: Ryu Tanimoto

Urawa Red Diamonds won 2–1 on aggregate.

=== Final ===
This was Avispa's first major tournament final, while for Urawa this was their seventh J.League Cup final, winning two from the previous six. Their most recent final was in 2016, which they won.

4 November 2023
13:12

Avispa Fukuoka	2–1	Urawa Red Diamonds
Mae 5'; Miya 45+4'	JLeague.co (EN); JLeague.jp (JA)	Akimoto 67'

Japan National Stadium, Tokyo
Attendance: 61,683
Referee: Futoshi Nakamura

== Top scorers ==
Rank	Player	Club	Goals
1	(Japan) Noriyoshi Sakai	Nagoya Grampus	4
1	(Japan) Asahi Uenaka	Yokohama F. Marinos	4
3	(Netherlands) Bryan Linssen	Urawa Red Diamonds	3
3	(Japan) Makoto Mitsuta	Sanfrecce Hiroshima	3
3	(Japan) Kota Mizunuma	Yokohama F. Marinos	3
3	(Japan) Sho Sasaki	Sanfrecce Hiroshima	3
3	(Japan) Reiju Tsuruno	Avispa Fukuoka	3
3	(Slovenia) Milan Tučić	Hokkaido Consadole Sapporo	3
3	(Brazil) Wellington	Avispa Fukuoka	3
3	(Japan) Naoki Yamada	Shonan Bellmare	3
