= Riku Yamada =

Japanese footballer

Riku Yamada 山田 陸
Personal information
- Full name: Riku Yamada
- Date of birth: 15 April 1998 (age 28)
- Place of birth: Kiyose, Tokyo, Japan
- Height: 1.76 m (5 ft 9 1/2 in)
- Position: Midfielder

Team information
- Current team: V-Varen Nagasaki
- Number: 24

Youth career
- –2007: Yokogawa Musashino
- 2008–2016: Omiya Ardija

Senior career*
Years	Team	Apps	(Gls)
2017–2020	Omiya Ardija	0	(0)
2018	→ Grulla Morioka (loan)	20	(0)
2019	→ Nagano Parceiro (loan)	24	(2)
2020	→ Ventforet Kofu (loan)	25	(1)
2021–2022	Ventforet Kofu	77	(3)
2023	Nagoya Grampus	6	(0)
2024–	→ V-Varen Nagasaki	62	(0)
- * Club domestic league appearances and goals as of 11 August 2026

Riku Yamada (山田 陸, Yamada Riku; born April 15, 1998) is a Japanese professional footballer who plays as a midfielder for J1 League club V-Varen Nagasaki.

== Career ==
Riku Yamada joined J1 League club Omiya Ardija in 2017. On May 31, he debuted in J.League Cup (v Júbilo Iwata).

After loan at Grulla Morioka, AC Nagano Parceiro and Ventforet Kofu for three years respectively. On 29 November 2020, Riku Yamada officially transferred to Ventforet Kofu for the 2021 season. On 16 October 2022, he brought his club winner 2022 Emperor's Cup for the first time in history after defeat Sanfrecce Hiroshima penalty 5-4. He left the club in 2022 after three years at Kofu.

On 30 November 2022, Yamada officially transferred to Nagoya Grampus for the 2023 season. He only made 13 appearances across all competitions throughout the season.

After only one season at Nagoya Grampus, Yamada transferred to J2 League club V-Varen Nagasaki for the 2024 season.

== Career statistics ==
=== Club ===
As of 19 March 2024

Appearances and goals by club, season and competition
Club	Season	League			National Cup		League Cup		Other		Total	
Club	Season	Division	Apps	Goals	Apps	Goals	Apps	Goals	Apps	Goals	Apps	Goals
Japan			League		Emperor's Cup		J. League Cup		Other		Total	
Omiya Ardija	2017	J1 League	0	0	1	0	1	0	–		2	0
Grulla Morioka (loan)	2018	J3 League	20	0	1	0	–		–		21	0
AC Nagano Parceiro (loan)	2019	J3 League	24	2	2	0	–		–		26	2
Ventforet Kofu (loan)	2020	J2 League	25	1	0	0	–		–		25	1
Ventforet Kofu	2021	J2 League	37	2	0	0	–		–		37	2
Ventforet Kofu	2022	J2 League	40	1	4	0	–		–		44	1
Ventforet Kofu	Total		77	3	4	0	0	0	0	0	81	3
Nagoya Grampus	2023	J1 League	6	0	2	0	5	0	–		13	0
V-Varen Nagasaki	2024	J2 League	4	0	2	0	1	0	–		5	0
Career total			156	6	12	0	7	0	0	0	173	6

== Honours ==
=== Club ===
Ventforet Kofu

- Emperor's Cup: 2022
