= Takumi Nakamura =

Japanese footballer (born 2001)

Takumi Nakamura 中村 拓海
Personal information
- Date of birth: 16 March 2001 (age 25)
- Place of birth: Ōita, Japan
- Height: 1.77 m (5 ft 10 in)
- Position: Defender

Team information
- Current team: Cerezo Osaka
- Number: 2

Youth career
- 2016–2018: Higashi Fukuoka High School

Senior career*
Years	Team	Apps	(Gls)
2019	FC Tokyo U-23	21	(0)
2019–2022	FC Tokyo	35	(0)
2022–2024	Yokohama FC	69	(0)
2025–	Cerezo Osaka	5	(0)

International career^{‡}
2018–2019	Japan U18	3	(0)
2019	Japan U19	1	(1)
2019–	Japan U20	2	(0)
- * Club domestic league appearances and goals as of 10 August 2026 ‡ National team caps and goals as of 17:04, 9 November 2019 (UTC)

Takumi Nakamura (中村 拓海, Nakamura Takumi; born 16 March 2001) is a Japanese footballer who plays as a defender for J1 League club Cerezo Osaka.

== Career ==
On 22 November 2018, Cerezo Osaka announced that Nakamura would join the team from the 2019 season.

Nakamura officially joined Yokohama FC on 21 December 2019.

On 20 December 2024, Nakamura was announced at Cerezo Osaka.

== Style of play ==
Nakamura is described as "an attacking fullback who creates chances" and is noted for his ability to also play as a defensive midfielder.

== Personal life ==
Nakamura's older brother is fellow footballer Shun Nakamura.

== Career statistics ==
=== Club ===
As of 16 October 2022.

Club	Season	League			National Cup		League Cup		Continental		Total	
Club	Season	Division	Apps	Goals	Apps	Goals	Apps	Goals	Apps	Goals	Apps	Goals
FC Tokyo U-23	2019	J3 League	21	0	–		–		–		21	0
FC Tokyo	2019	J1 League	0	0	1 (Note: Appearances in the Emperor's Cup)	0	3 (Note: Appearances in the J. League Cup)	0	–		4	0
FC Tokyo	2020	J1 League	17	0	–		1	0	5	0	23	0
FC Tokyo	2021	J1 League	18	0	1	0	10	0	–		29	0
FC Tokyo	Total		35	0	2	0	14	0	5	0	56	0
Yokohama FC	2022	J2 League	32	0	2	0	–		–		34	0
Career total			88	0	4	0	14	0	5	0	111	0
