= Akinari Kawazura =

Japanese footballer

Akinari Kawazura 河面旺成
Personal information
- Full name: Akinari Kawazura
- Date of birth: May 3, 1994 (age 32)
- Place of birth: Kyōtanabe, Kyoto, Japan
- Height: 1.84 m (6 ft 0 in)
- Position: Left back

Team information
- Current team: Mito HollyHock (on loan from Nagoya Grampus)
- Number: 4

Youth career
- –2009: Cerezo Osaka
- 2010–2012: Sakuyo High School

College career
| Years | Team | Apps | (Gls) |
| 2013–2016 | Meiji University | | |

Senior career*
| Years | Team | Apps | (Gls) |
| 2017–2021 | Omiya Ardija | 118 | (2) |
| 2022– | Nagoya Grampus | 60 | (1) |
| 2026– | → Mito HollyHock (loan) | 1 | (0) |
- * Club domestic league appearances and goals as of 12 August 2026

Akinari Kawazura (河面 旺成, Kawazura Akinari; born May 3, 1994) is a Japanese professional footballer who plays as a left back for the J1 League club Mito HollyHock, on loan from Nagoya Grampus.

== Career ==
Akinari Kawazura joined J1 League club Omiya Ardija in 2017. On April 12, he debuted in the J.League Cup against Kashiwa Reysol. After five years playing for Omiya Ardija, making over 100 appearances for the club, Kawazura joined the J1 League club Nagoya Grampus in December 2021.

== Club statistics ==
As of match played 21 October 2023

Appearances and goals by club, season and competition
| Club | Season | League | | | National cup | | League cup | | Other | | Total | |
| Club | Season | Division | Apps | Goals | Apps | Goals | Apps | Goals | Apps | Goals | Apps | Goals |
| Japan | | | League | | Emperor's Cup | | J. League Cup | | Other | | Total | |
|---|---|---|---|---|---|---|---|---|---|---|---|---|
| Omiya Ardija | 2017 | J1 League | 1 | 0 | 2 | 0 | 6 | 0 | – | | 9 | 0 |
| Omiya Ardija | 2018 | J2 League | 38 | 0 | 0 | 0 | – | | 1 (Note: J1/J2 Play-offs) | 0 | 39 | 0 |
| Omiya Ardija | 2019 | J2 League | 41 | 2 | 1 | 0 | – | | – | | 42 | 2 |
| Omiya Ardija | 2020 | J2 League | 18 | 0 | 0 | 0 | – | | – | | 18 | 0 |
| Omiya Ardija | 2021 | J2 League | 19 | 0 | 0 | 0 | – | | – | | 14 | 1 |
| Omiya Ardija | Total | | 117 | 2 | 3 | 0 | 6 | 0 | 1 | 0 | 127 | 2 |
| Nagoya Grampus | 2022 | J1 League | 1 | 0 | 2 | 0 | 3 | 0 | – | | 6 | 0 |
| Nagoya Grampus | 2023 | J1 League | 13 | 0 | 4 | 0 | 6 | 0 | – | | 23 | 0 |
| Nagoya Grampus | Total | | 14 | 0 | 6 | 0 | 9 | 0 | 0 | 0 | 29 | 0 |
| Career total | | | 131 | 2 | 9 | 0 | 15 | 0 | 1 | 0 | 156 | 2 |

== Honours ==
Nagoya Grampus

- J.League Cup: 2024
