= Taiyō Hiraoka =

Japanese footballer

Taiyō Hiraoka 平岡 大陽
Personal information
- Full name: Taiyō Hiraoka
- Date of birth: 14 September 2002 (age 24)
- Place of birth: Takarazuka, Hyōgo, Japan
- Height: 1.73 m (5 ft 8 in)
- Position: Attacking midfielder

Team information
- Current team: Kyoto Sanga
- Number: 16

Youth career
- Nagao Warrs FC
- 2015–2017: Cerezo Osaka Nishi
- 2018–2020: Riseisha High School

Senior career*
Years	Team	Apps	(Gls)
2021–2025	Shonan Bellmare	106	(9)
2026–	Kyoto Sanga	13	(0)
- * Club domestic league appearances and goals as of 1 August 2026

Taiyō Hiraoka (平岡 大陽, Hiraoka Taiyō; born 14 September 2002) is a Japanese footballer currently playing as an attacking midfielder for J1 League club Kyoto Sanga.

== Career statistics ==
=== Club ===
As of 1 August 2026.

Appearances and goals by club, season and competition
Club	Season	League			National cup (Note: Includes Emperors Cup)		League cup (Note: Includes J.League Cup)		Total	
Club	Season	Division	Apps	Goals	Apps	Goals	Apps	Goals	Apps	Goals
Shonan Bellmare	2021	J1 League	10	1	2	1	7	1	19	3
Shonan Bellmare	2022	J1 League	13	0	2	0	3	0	18	0
Shonan Bellmare	2023	J1 League	29	3	2	0	4	1	35	4
Shonan Bellmare	2024	J1 League	26	1	0	0	1	0	27	1
Shonan Bellmare	2025	J1 League	28	4	2	0	2	1	32	5
Shonan Bellmare	Total		106	9	8	1	17	3	131	13
Kyoto Sanga	2026	J1 (100)	13	0	–		–		13	0
Career total			119	9	8	1	17	3	144	13
