= Daihachi Okamura =

Japanese footballer

Daihachi Okamura 岡村 大八
Personal information
- Date of birth: 15 February 1997 (age 29)
- Place of birth: Tokyo, Japan
- Height: 1.83 m (6 ft 0 in)
- Position: Centre back

Team information
- Current team: Machida Zelvia
- Number: 50

Youth career
- Buddy FC Setagaya
- Kinder Yoshimitsu FC
- FC Hortencia
- 2012–2014: Maebashi Ikuei High School

College career
Years	Team	Apps	(Gls)
2015–2018	Rissho University		

Senior career*
Years	Team	Apps	(Gls)
2019–2020	Thespakusatsu Gunma	45	(2)
2019	→ Tegevajaro Miyazaki (loan)	9	(0)
2021–2024	Hokkaido Consadole Sapporo	111	(5)
2025–	Machida Zelvia	50	(5)
- * Club domestic league appearances and goals as of 9 August 2026

Daihachi Okamura (岡村 大八, Okamura Daihachi; born 15 February 1997) is a Japanese footballer who play as a centre back and currently play for Machida Zelvia.

== Career ==
On 7 January 2025, Okamura announce official transfer to J1 club, Machida Zelvia for 2025 season.

== Career statistics ==
=== Club ===
As of 9 August 2026.

Club	Season	League			National Cup		League Cup		Continental		Other		Total	
Club	Season	Division	Apps	Goals	Apps	Goals	Apps	Goals	Apps	Goals	Apps	Goals	Apps	Goals
Thespakusatsu Gunma	2019	J3 League	3	0	2 (Note: Appearances in the Emperor's Cup)	0	0	0	—		0	0	5	0
Thespakusatsu Gunma	2020	J2 League	42	2	0	0	0	0	—		0	0	42	2
Thespakusatsu Gunma	Total		45	2	2	0	0	0	—		0	0	47	2
Tegevajaro Miyazaki (loan)	2019	JFL	9	0	0	0	—		—		—		9	0
Hokkaido Consadole Sapporo	2021	J1 League	21	1	2	0	7 (Note: Appearances in the J.League Cup)	0	—		—		30	1
Hokkaido Consadole Sapporo	2022	J1 League	26	1	2	1	7	1	—		—		35	3
Hokkaido Consadole Sapporo	2023	J1 League	31	1	2	1	5	1	—		—		38	2
Hokkaido Consadole Sapporo	2024	J1 League	33	2	1	0	3	0	—		—		37	2
Hokkaido Consadole Sapporo	Total		111	5	7	1	22	2	—		—		140	8
Machida Zelvia	2025	J1 League	32	4	3	1	2	0	3 (Note: Appearances in AFC Champions League Elite)	0	0	0	40	5
Machida Zelvia	2026	J1 League	17	0	0	0	0	0	7	0	0	0	24	0
Machida Zelvia	2026–27	J1 League	1	1	0	0	0	0	0	0	0	0	1	1
Machida Zelvia	Total		50	5	3	1	2	0	10	0	—		65	6
Career total			215	12	12	2	24	2	10	0	0	0	261	16

== Honours ==
Machida Zelvia

- Emperor's Cup: 2025
