= Yuki Nogami =

Japanese footballer

Yuki Nogami 野上 結貴
Personal information
- Full name: Yuki Nogami
- Date of birth: April 20, 1991 (age 35)
- Place of birth: Suginami, Tokyo, Japan
- Height: 1.80 m (5 ft 11 in)
- Position: Centre back

Team information
- Current team: Nagoya Grampus
- Number: 2

Youth career
- 1998–2003: Wakasugi SC
- 2004–2006: Forza '02
- 2007–2009: Hozen High School

College career
| Years | Team | Apps | (Gls) |
| 2010–2013 | Toin University of Yokohama | | |

Senior career*
| Years | Team | Apps | (Gls) |
| 2013–2016 | Yokohama FC | 130 | (6) |
| 2016–2022 | Sanfrecce Hiroshima | 158 | (2) |
| 2023– | Nagoya Grampus | 103 | (3) |
Medal record
Sanfrecce Hiroshima
| Runner-up | J1 League | 2018 |
- * Club domestic league appearances and goals as of 12 August 2026

Yuki Nogami (野上 結貴, Nogami Yūki; born April 20, 1991) is a Japanese professional footballer who plays as a centre back for J1 League club Nagoya Grampus.

== Career ==
Nogami started playing football when he was in either the first or second grade, starting out as a forward. He tried out for FC Tokyo's youth academy, but wasn't selected, and instead went to Forza '02 and Hozen High School.

On 11 July 2016, Nogami was announced at Sanfreece Hiroshima, becoming the club's second summer signing. On 4 September 2016, he scored against Gamba Osaka in the J.League Cup, scoring in the 24th minute. During the 2017 season, Nogami played 24 league games and renewed his contract with the club for the 2018 season. During the 2018 season, he played 30 league games, and signed a new contract with the club for the 2019 season. During the 2019 season, he played 33 league matches, and signed a new contract with the club for the 2020 season.

On 2 December 2022, Nogami was announced at Nagoya Grampus. On 5 January 2025, his contract was renewed for the 2025 season.

Nogami has won the J.League Cup twice, once with Sanfrecce Hiroshima in 2022, and once with Nagoya Grampus in 2024. He has played over 150 J1 matches in his career.

== Style of play ==
Nogami likes to give advice to his teammates. He believes his strengths are "heading, one-on-one situations, and build-up play.". As well as playing center-back, he can also play as a right back, or as a defensive midfielder.

== Club statistics ==
Updated to 5 November 2022.

| Club performance | | | League | | Cup | | League Cup | | Continental | | Total | |
| Season | Club | League | Apps | Goals | Apps | Goals | Apps | Goals | Apps | Goals | Apps | Goals |
| Japan | | | League | | Emperor's Cup | | J. League Cup | | ACL | | Total | |
|---|---|---|---|---|---|---|---|---|---|---|---|---|
| 2012 | Yokohama FC | J2 League | 3 | 0 | – | | – | | – | | 3 | 0 |
| 2013 | Yokohama FC | J2 League | 41 | 1 | 0 | 0 | – | | – | | 41 | 1 |
| 2014 | Yokohama FC | J2 League | 41 | 5 | 1 | 0 | – | | – | | 42 | 5 |
| 2015 | Yokohama FC | J2 League | 37 | 0 | 2 | 0 | – | | – | | 39 | 0 |
| 2016 | Yokohama FC | J2 League | 8 | 0 | – | | – | | – | | 8 | 0 |
| 2016 | Sanfrecce Hiroshima | J1 League | 4 | 0 | 2 | 0 | 2 | 1 | – | | 8 | 1 |
| 2017 | Sanfrecce Hiroshima | J1 League | 24 | 0 | 2 | 0 | 6 | 0 | – | | 32 | 0 |
| 2018 | Sanfrecce Hiroshima | J1 League | 30 | 0 | 1 | 0 | 4 | 0 | – | | 35 | 0 |
| 2019 | Sanfrecce Hiroshima | J1 League | 33 | 1 | 1 | 0 | 2 | 0 | 6 | 0 | 42 | 1 |
| 2020 | Sanfrecce Hiroshima | J1 League | 30 | 1 | – | | 2 | 0 | – | | 32 | 1 |
| 2021 | Sanfrecce Hiroshima | J1 League | 37 | 0 | 0 | 0 | 1 | 0 | – | | 38 | 0 |
| 2022 | Sanfrecce Hiroshima | J1 League | 25 | 1 | 5 | 0 | 13 | 1 | – | | 43 | 2 |
| 2023 | Nagoya Grampus | J1 League | 0 | 0 | 0 | 0 | 0 | 0 | – | | 0 | 0 |
| Total | | | 313 | 9 | 14 | 0 | 30 | 2 | 6 | 0 | 363 | 11 |

== Honours ==
=== Club ===
Sanfrecce Hiroshima

- J.League Cup: 2022

Nagoya Grampus

- J.League Cup: 2024
