= Daichi Sugimoto =

Japanese footballer

Daichi Sugimoto 杉本 大地
Personal information
- Full name: Daichi Sugimoto
- Date of birth: July 15, 1993 (age 33)
- Place of birth: Kanagawa, Japan
- Height: 1.86 m (6 ft 1 in)
- Position: Goalkeeper

Team information
- Current team: SC Sagamihara
- Number: 22

Youth career
- Samukawa SC
- Hogawa SSS
- 2006–2008: Yamaha Júbilo SS Hamamatsu
- 2009–2011: Kyoto Sanga FC

Senior career*
Years	Team	Apps	(Gls)
2012–2015	Kyoto Sanga FC	12	(0)
2015	→ J.League U-22 Selection (loan)	1	(0)
2016	→ Tokushima Vortis (loan)	2	(0)
2017–2019	Yokohama F. Marinos	4	(0)
2020–2021	Júbilo Iwata	8	(0)
2022	Vegalta Sendai	15	(0)
2023–2025	Nagoya Grampus	0	(0)
2026–	SC Sagamihara	2	(0)

International career
2012	Japan U18		
2013	Japan U19		
2014	Japan U20		
2015	Japan U21		
2017	Japan U23		
Medal record
Yokohama F. Marinos
Runner-up	J.League Cup	2018
Runner-up	Emperor's Cup	2017
Representing Japan
AFC U-23 Championship
Gold medal – first place	2016 Qatar
- * Club domestic league appearances and goals as of 08:59, 23 April 2026 (UTC)

Daichi Sugimoto (杉本 大地, Sugimoto Daichi; born July 15, 1993 in Kanagawa) is a Japanese footballer who plays as a goalkeeper for J3 League club SC Sagamihara.

== Playing career ==
Daichi Sugimoto joined J2 League club Kyoto Sanga FC in 2012. In 2016, he moved to Tokushima Vortis before joining J1 League side Yokohama F. Marinos in 2017.

== Club statistics ==
As of 23 April 2026.

Appearances and goals by club, season and competition
Club	Season	League			National cup (Note: Includes Emperors Cup)		League cup (Note: Includes J.League Cup)		Total	
Club	Season	Division	Apps	Goals	Apps	Goals	Apps	Goals	Apps	Goals
Kyoto Sanga	2014	J.League Division 2	7	0	0	0	–		7	0
Kyoto Sanga	2015	J2 League	5	0	1	0	–		6	0
Kyoto Sanga	Total		12	0	1	0	0	0	13	0
J.League U-22 Selection (loan)	2015	J3 League	1	0	–		–		1	0
Tokushima Vortis (loan)	2016	J2 League	2	0	1	0	–		3	0
Yokohama F. Marinos	2017	J1 League	0	0	2	0	6	0	8	0
Yokohama F. Marinos	2018	J1 League	0	0	0	0	3	0	3	0
Yokohama F. Marinos	2019	J1 League	4	0	2	0	0	0	6	0
Yokohama F. Marinos	Total		4	0	4	0	9	0	17	0
Júbilo Iwata	2020	J2 League	8	0	0	0	–		8	0
Júbilo Iwata	2021	J2 League	0	0	2	0	–		2	0
Júbilo Iwata	Total		8	0	2	0	0	0	10	0
Vegalta Sendai	2022	J2 League	15	0	2	0	–		17	0
Nagoya Grampus	2023	J1 League	0	0	0	0	0	0	0	0
Nagoya Grampus	2024	J1 League	0	0	0	0	0	0	0	0
Nagoya Grampus	2025	J1 League	0	0	0	0	0	0	0	0
Nagoya Grampus	Total		0	0	0	0	0	0	0	0
SC Sagamihara	2026	J2/J3 (100)	2	0	–		–		2	0
Career total			44	0	10	0	9	0	63	0

== International ==
- Japan national under-18 football team
  - 2012 AFC U-19 Championship qualification
- Japan national under-19 football team
  - 2013 AFC U-22 Championship qualification
  - 2012 AFC U-19 Championship
- Japan national under-20 football team
  - Football at the 2013 East Asian Games
- Japan national under-21 football team
  - 2013 AFC U-22 Championship
- Japan national under-23 football team
  - 2016 AFC U-23 Championship
  - Football at the 2016 Summer Olympics (Backup member)
