= Takafumi Mikuriya =

Japanese former footballer, current football referee (born 1984)

Personal information
- Full name: Takafumi Mikuriya
- Date of birth: May 11, 1984 (age 42)
- Place of birth: Nagasaki, Japan
- Height: 1.80 m (5 ft 11 in)
- Position: Defender

Youth career
- 2000–2002: Kaisei High School

College career
| Years | Team | Apps | (Gls) |
| 2003–2006 | Osaka University of Health and Sport Sciences | | |

Senior career*
| Years | Team | Apps | (Gls) |
| 2007–2009 | Ventforet Kofu | 17 | (0) |
| 2010–2012 | Thespa Kusatsu | 100 | (7) |
| 2013–2014 | Kataller Toyama | 42 | (0) |
| Total | | 159 | (7) |
- * Club domestic league appearances and goals

Takafumi Mikuriya (御厨 貴文, Mikuriya Takafumi; born May 11, 1984) is a former Japanese football player and current referee.

Mikuriya graduated from Kaisei High School. He attended Osaka University of Physical Education, and was signed to Ventforet Kofu in 2007.

== Club statistics ==
Appearances and goals by club, season and competition
| Club | Season | League | | | Emperor's Cup | | J.League Cup | | Total | |
| Club | Season | Division | Apps | Goals | Apps | Goals | Apps | Goals | !Apps | Goals |
|---|---|---|---|---|---|---|---|---|---|---|
| Ventforet Kofu | 2007 | J1 League | 0 | 0 | 1 | 0 | 0 | 0 | 1 | 0 |
| Ventforet Kofu | 2008 | J2 League | 4 | 0 | 0 | 0 | — | | 4 | 0 |
| Ventforet Kofu | 2009 | J2 League | 13 | 0 | 0 | 0 | — | | 13 | 0 |
| Thespa Kusatsu | 2010 | J2 League | 31 | 3 | 1 | 0 | — | | 32 | 3 |
| Thespa Kusatsu | 2011 | J2 League | 33 | 2 | 1 | 0 | — | | 34 | 2 |
| Thespa Kusatsu | 2012 | J2 League | 36 | 2 | 0 | 0 | — | | 36 | 2 |
| Kataller Toyama | 2013 | J2 League | 20 | 0 | 0 | 0 | — | | 20 | 0 |
| Kataller Toyama | 2014 | J2 League | | | | | — | | | |
| Career total | | | 137 | 7 | 3 | 0 | 0 | 0 | 140 | 7 |
