= Jumpei Iida =

Japanese football referee (born 1981)

- Full name: Jumpei Iida
- Born: August 14, 1981 (age 45); Odawara, Kanagawa Prefecture, Japan

International
Years	League	Role

Jumpei Iida (飯田 淳平, Iida Junpei; born 14 August 1981 in Odawara, Kanagawa) is a Japanese football referee. He has officiated matches in numerous international tournaments including EAFF Championship and AFC Cup. Locally he has officiated regularly in the J. League. In 2012, he officiated in the English FA Cup and Professional Development League.

He broke the world record for the fastest red card decision in a professional league match on 15 April 2009, when he sent off Tokyo Verdy midfielder Tomo Sugawara 9 seconds into the match between Tokyo Verdy and Sagan Tosu.

Iida also officiated the pre season friendly between Melbourne Victory and Liverpool in front of over 95,000 spectators at the Melbourne Cricket Ground in 2013.

In October 2026, he officiated his 300th J1 League game, becoming the seventh referee to do so.
