= Tojiro Kubo =

Japanese footballer

Tojiro Kubo 久保 藤次郎
Personal information
- Date of birth: 5 April 1999 (age 27)
- Place of birth: Aichi, Japan
- Height: 1.67 m (5 ft 6 in)
- Position: Midfielder

Team information
- Current team: Kashiwa Reysol
- Number: 24

Youth career
- FC Verdao
- 2012–2014: Grampus Miyoshi FC
- 2015–2017: Teikyo University Kani High School

College career
Years	Team	Apps	(Gls)
2018–2021	Chukyo University		

Senior career*
Years	Team	Apps	(Gls)
2021–2023	Fujieda MYFC	63	(17)
2023–2024	Nagoya Grampus	21	(2)
2024	Sagan Tosu	7	(2)
2025–	Kashiwa Reysol	49	(9)

International career^{‡}
2025–	Japan	1	(0)
- * Club domestic league appearances and goals as of 10 August 2026 ‡ National team caps and goals as of 8 July 2025

Tojiro Kubo (久保 藤次郎, Kubo Tōjirō; born 5 April 1999) is a Japanese professional footballer who plays as a midfielder for Kashiwa Reysol and the Japan national team.

== Career ==
In July 2023, Kubo joined J1 League side Nagoya Grampus on a permanent deal.

== Career statistics ==
=== Club ===
As of 10 July 2021.

Club	Season	League			National Cup		League Cup		Other		Total	
Club	Season	Division	Apps	Goals	Apps	Goals	Apps	Goals	Apps	Goals	Apps	Goals
Fujieda MYFC	2021	J3 League	3	0	0	0	–		0	0	3	0
Career total			3	0	0	0	0	0	0	0	3	0

== Honours ==
Japan

- EAFF Championship: 2025
