= Noriyoshi Sakai =

Japanese footballer (born 1992)

Noriyoshi Sakai 酒井 宣福
Personal information
- Full name: Noriyoshi Sakai
- Date of birth: 9 November 1992 (age 33)
- Place of birth: Sanjō, Niigata, Japan
- Height: 1.80 m (5 ft 11 in)
- Positions: Winger; forward; right back

Team information
- Current team: Sagan Tosu
- Number: 15

Youth career
- 2008–2010: Teikyo Nagaoka High School

Senior career*
| Years | Team | Apps | (Gls) |
| 2011–2017 | Albirex Niigata | 44 | (1) |
| 2014–2015 | → Avispa Fukuoka (loan) | 82 | (17) |
| 2016 | → Fagiano Okayama (loan) | 10 | (0) |
| 2018–2021 | Omiya Ardija | 67 | (5) |
| 2021 | Sagan Tosu | 34 | (8) |
| 2022–2024 | Nagoya Grampus | 56 | (7) |
| 2024 | → Renofa Yamaguchi (Loan) | 10 | (2) |
| 2025– | Sagan Tosu | 29 | (5) |
- * Club domestic league appearances and goals as of 14 August 2026

Noriyoshi Sakai (酒井 宣福, Sakai Noriyoshi; born 9 November 1992) is a Japanese professional footballer who plays for J2 League club Sagan Tosu.

A versatile midfielder, Sakai can play in many different positions, although left wing is his preferred position.

== Club career ==
On 2 November 2010, Sakai signed for J. League club Albirex Niigata. He made his J. League debut on 7 May 2011, coming on as a substitute for Yoshiyuki Kobayashi against Omiya Ardija. After playing 450 minutes with Albirex Niigata, Sakai signed a Professional A contract with the club on 5 June 2013.

On 7 January 2014, Sakai was announced at Avispa Fukuoka on a one year loan.

On 19 July 2016, Sakai was announced at Fagiano Okayama on a six month loan.

On 7 January 2018, Sakai was announced at Omiya Ardija on a permanent transfer. On 8 December 2020, the club announced it would not be renewing his contract for the 2021 season.

On 29 December 2020, Sakai was announced at Sagan Tosu on a permanent transfer.

On 21 December 2021, Sakai was announced at Nagoya Grampus on a permanent transfer.

On 4 July 2024, Sakai was announced at Renofa Yamaguchi FC on a six month loan. On 9 December 2024, his loan with Renofa Yamaguchi expired, and his contract with Nagoya Grampus would expire at the end of the season.

On 5 January 2025, Sakai announced that he would return to newly relegated J2 club Sagan Tosu.

== Personal life ==
Sakai is the younger brother of Gōtoku Sakai, who is currently playing for J1 League club Vissel Kobe, while his youngest brother Goson Sakai last played for German club FV Illertissen. During the 2011 season with Albirex Niigata, he shared a squad with Gōtoku Sakai.

== Career statistics ==
=== Club ===
As of the start from 2025 season

Appearances and goals by club, season and competition
| Club | Season | League | | | National cup | | League cup | | Other | | Total | |
| Club | Season | Division | Apps | Goals | Apps | Goals | Apps | Goals | Apps | Goals | Apps | Goals |
| Japan | | | League | | Emperor's Cup | | J. League Cup | | Other | | Total | |
|---|---|---|---|---|---|---|---|---|---|---|---|---|
| Albirex Niigata | 2011 | J.League Div 1 | 3 | 0 | 0 | 0 | 0 | 0 | – | | 3 | 0 |
| Albirex Niigata | 2012 | J.League Div 1 | 2 | 0 | 1 | 0 | 1 | 0 | – | | 4 | 0 |
| Albirex Niigata | 2013 | J.League Div 1 | 7 | 0 | 1 | 0 | 3 | 0 | – | | 11 | 0 |
| Albirex Niigata | 2016 | J1 League | 9 | 0 | 0 | 0 | 3 | 0 | – | | 12 | 0 |
| Albirex Niigata | 2017 | J1 League | 11 | 1 | 1 | 0 | 2 | 0 | – | | 14 | 1 |
| Albirex Niigata | Total | | 32 | 1 | 3 | 0 | 9 | 0 | 0 | 0 | 44 | 1 |
| Avispa Fukuoka (loan) | 2014 | J.League Div 2 | 37 | 7 | 1 | 0 | – | | – | | 38 | 7 |
| Avispa Fukuoka (loan) | 2015 | J2 League | 39 | 7 | 3 | 3 | – | | 2 (Note: J1 League Promotion play-off) | 0 | 44 | 10 |
| Avispa Fukuoka (loan) | Total | | 76 | 14 | 4 | 3 | 0 | 0 | 2 | 0 | 82 | 17 |
| Fagiano Okayama (loan) | 2016 | J2 League | 6 | 0 | 2 | 0 | – | | 2 | 0 | 10 | 0 |
| Omiya Ardija | 2018 | J2 League | 36 | 3 | 0 | 0 | – | | 1 (Note: J1/J2 Play-offs) | 0 | 37 | 3 |
| Omiya Ardija | 2019 | J2 League | 22 | 2 | 2 | 0 | – | | 1 | 0 | 25 | 2 |
| Omiya Ardija | 2020 | J2 League | 5 | 0 | 0 | 0 | – | | – | | 5 | 0 |
| Omiya Ardija | Total | | 63 | 5 | 2 | 0 | 0 | 0 | 2 | 0 | 67 | 5 |
| Sagan Tosu | 2021 | J1 League | 29 | 8 | 3 | 0 | 2 | 0 | – | | 34 | 8 |
| Nagoya Grampus | 2022 | J1 League | 17 | 2 | 0 | 0 | 5 | 1 | – | | 22 | 3 |
| Nagoya Grampus | 2023 | J1 League | 20 | 0 | 4 | 0 | 4 | 4 | – | | 28 | 4 |
| Nagoya Grampus | 2024 | J1 League | 3 | 0 | 1 | 0 | 1 | 0 | – | | 5 | 0 |
| Renofa Yamaguchi | 2024 | J2 League | 10 | 2 | – | | | | | | 10 | 2 |
| Sagan Tosu | 2025 | J2 League | 0 | 0 | 0 | 0 | 0 | 0 | – | | 0 | 0 |
| Career total | | | 256 | 32 | 20 | 3 | 21 | 5 | 6 | 0 | 303 | 40 |
