= Taika Nakashima =

Japanese footballer

Taika Nakashima 中島 大嘉
Personal information
- Full name: Taika Nakashima
- Date of birth: 8 June 2002 (age 24)
- Place of birth: Osaka, Japan
- Height: 1.88 m (6 ft 2 in)
- Position: Striker

Team information
- Current team: Thespa Gunma
- Number: 99

Youth career
- 2010–2014: Iris FC Sumiyoshi
- 2015–2017: Rip Ace SC
- 2018–2020: Kunimi High School

Senior career*
Years	Team	Apps	(Gls)
2021–2025	Hokkaido Consadole Sapporo	32	(2)
2023	→ Nagoya Grampus (loan)	11	(0)
2024	→ Fujieda MYFC (loan)	6	(0)
2024	→ Mito HollyHock (loan)	13	(4)
2025	→ Thespa Gunma (loan)	4	(0)
2026–	Thespa Gunma	21	(7)

International career^{‡}
2022–	Japan U23	6	(1)
- * Club domestic league appearances and goals as of 25 August 2026 ‡ National team caps and goals as of 17:04, 8 June 2022 (UTC)

Taika Nakashima (中島 大嘉, Nakashima Taika; born 8 June 2002) is a Japanese professional footballer who plays as a striker for J3 League club Thespa Gunma.

== Career statistics ==
=== Club ===
As of 27 July 2023.

Appearances and goals by club, season and competition
Club	Season	League			National Cup		League Cup		Total	
Club	Season	Division	Apps	Goals	Apps	Goals	Apps	Goals	Apps	Goals
Japan			League		Emperor's Cup		J.League Cup		Total	
Hokkaido Consadole Sapporo	2021	J1 League	3	0	2	3	4	1	9	4
Hokkaido Consadole Sapporo	2022	J1 League	15	1	1	0	5	3	21	4
Hokkaido Consadole Sapporo	2023	J1 League	8	0	1	1	5	1	14	2
Hokkaido Consadole Sapporo	Total		26	1	4	4	14	5	44	10
Nagoya Grampus (loan)	2023	J1 League	0	0	0	0	0	0	0	0
Career total			26	1	4	4	14	5	44	10
