= Ryōga Kida =

Japanese footballer

Ryōga Kida 貴田 遼河
Personal information
- Date of birth: 15 July 2005 (age 21)
- Place of birth: Tokyo, Japan
- Height: 1.76 m (5 ft 9 in)
- Position: Forward

Team information
- Current team: Argentinos Juniors (on loan from Nagoya Grampus)
- Number: 49

Youth career
- Tokyo Verdy
- FC Tama
- 2021–2023: Nagoya Grampus

Senior career*
Years	Team	Apps	(Gls)
2022–	Nagoya Grampus	12	(0)
2024–	→ Argentinos Juniors (loan)	4	(1)
2024–	→ Argentinos Juniors II (loan)	17	(4)
- * Club domestic league appearances and goals as of 23:30, 1 April 2025 (UTC)

Ryōga Kida (貴田 遼河, Kida Ryōga; born 15 July 2005) is a Japanese professional footballer who plays as a forward for Argentine Primera División club Argentinos Juniors, on loan from Nagoya Grampus.

== Youth career ==
Kida first started playing football for Tokyo Verdy Junior, before moving on to FC Tama Junior Youth. He studied at Tokai Gakuen High School and went on to join Nagoya Grampus U-18s.

He made his debut aged 15 for Nagoya Grampus U-18s in April 2021. He came on as a substitute in a Prince Takamado Trophy JFA U-18 Football League game against Júbilo Iwata U-18s. In July 2021, he scored his first goal for the U-18s in a 3–1 victory over Kawasaki Frontale U-18s in the Japan Club Youth Cup. Nagoya Grampus U-18s went on to win the cup competition, with Kida appearing as a subsitite in the final.

Kida continued with the U-18s for the 2022 season, making 19 appearances and scoring 6 goals for them in all competitions. He also made two appearances at the start of the 2023 season and scoring two goals, before joining up with the first team.

== Club career ==
=== Nagoya Grampus ===
In July 2022, aged 16, Kida joined up with the Nagoya Grampus first team squad as a Type 2 registered player, meaning he could continue to represent their U-18s as well as being registered with the first team. He made his debut for the club in the same month, in a 2–1 Emperor's Cup defeat to Cerezo Osaka. This was his only appearance throughout the 2022 J1 League season.

Kida scored his first goals for the club in April 2023, scoring twice in a 2–0 J.League Cup victory over Yokohama FC. Aged 17 years, 9 months and 4 days, Kida became Nagoya's youngest-ever goalscorer in the league cup, a record previously held since 2002 by Atsushi Katagiri. Following his performance in the league cup, on 2 May 2023 Kida signed his first professional contract with Nagoya. A few weeks later, he made his J1 League debut, appearing as a late substitute in a 2–2 draw with Vissel Kobe. He ended his first full season making 19 appearances across all competitions, scoring 3 goals.

Before the start of the 2024 season, Kida's squad number was changed from 42 to 31.

=== Loan to Argentinos Juniors ===
On 4 February 2024, it was announced that Kida would be joining Argentine Primera División club Argentinos Juniors on loan, with an option to buy. He initially played for the reserve squad.

Kida made his debut for the first team in the Apertura 2026, becoming the third Japanese player to play in the first division of Argentine football.

== International career ==
Kida was first named in the Japan national under-17 football team squad in August 2022 to take part in a tournament held in Hiroshima. In November 2022, he was called up again to the U-17s to take part in a tour of Croatia – his first overseas trip as a member of the national team.

== Career statistics ==
=== Club ===
As of 3 December 2023

Appearances and goals by club, season and competition
Club	Season	League			National Cup		League Cup		Total	
Club	Season	Division	Apps	Goals	Apps	Goals	Apps	Goals	Apps	Goals
Japan			League		Emperor's Cup		J. League Cup		Total	
Nagoya Grampus	2022	J1 League	0	0	1	0	0	0	1	0
Nagoya Grampus	2023	J1 League	12	0	2	1	5	2	19	3
Nagoya Grampus	Total		12	0	3	1	5	2	20	3
Career total			12	0	3	1	5	2	20	3
