= 2023 Avispa Fukuoka season =

Avispa Fukuoka
2023 season
- Chairman: Takashi Kawamori
- Manager: Shigetoshi Hasebe
- Stadium: Best Denki Stadium
- J1 League: 6th
- Emperor's Cup: Semi-finals
- J.League Cup: Winners
- Top goalscorer: League: Yuya Yamagishi (10 goals); All: Yuya Yamagishi (15 goals)
| Home colours | Away colours |
- All statistics correct as of 16:56, 12 November 2023 (UTC).

The 2023 season was Avispa Fukuoka's 41st season in existence and the club's third consecutive season in the top flight of Japanese football. In addition to the domestic league, Avispa Fukuoka participated in this season's edition of the Emperor's Cup and the J.League Cup.

== Players ==
=== First-team squad ===
As of 15 August 2023.

Note: Flags indicate national team as defined under FIFA eligibility rules; some limited exceptions apply. Players may hold more than one non-FIFA nationality.

| No. | Pos. | Nation | Player |
|---|---|---|---|
| 1 | GK | JPN | Takumi Nagaishi |
| 2 | DF | JPN | Masato Yuzawa |
| 3 | DF | JPN | Tatsuki Nara (captain) |
| 5 | DF | JPN | Daiki Miya (vice-captain) |
| 6 | MF | JPN | Hiroyuki Mae (vice-captain) |
| 7 | MF | JPN | Takeshi Kanamori (vice-captain) |
| 8 | MF | JPN | Kazuya Konno |
| 9 | FW | BRA | Lukian |
| 10 | FW | JPN | Hisashi Jogo |
| 11 | MF | JPN | Yuya Yamagishi |
| 14 | MF | JPN | Tatsuya Tanaka |
| 16 | DF | JPN | Itsuki Oda |
| 17 | FW | JPN | Shun Nakamura |
| 18 | FW | BRA | Wellington |
| 19 | MF | JPN | Sotan Tanabe |
| 20 | DF | JPN | KennedyEgbus Mikuni |
| 21 | GK | JPN | Takumi Yamanoi |
| 22 | DF | JPN | Masashi Kamekawa |

| No. | Pos. | Nation | Player |
|---|---|---|---|
| 26 | DF | JPN | Seiya Inoue |
| 27 | FW | JPN | Ryoga Sato |
| 28 | FW | JPN | Reiju Tsuruno |
| 29 | DF | JPN | Yota Maejima |
| 30 | MF | JPN | Masato Shigemi ^{DSP} |
| 31 | GK | JPN | Masaaki Murakami |
| 33 | DF | BRA | Douglas Grolli |
| 35 | MF | JPN | Yuto Hiratsuka |
| 37 | DF | JPN | Masaya Tashiro |
| 41 | GK | JPN | Daiki Sakata |
| 44 | DF | JPN | Kimiya Moriyama (vice-captain) |
| 45 | FW | JPN | Ichika Maeda ^{Type 2} |
| 46 | MF | JPN | Katsuki Nishimura ^{Type 2} |
| 47 | MF | JPN | Sota Iwanaga ^{Type 2} |
| 49 | GK | JPN | Jin Tokishi ^{Type 2} |
| 51 | GK | JPN | Kazuaki Suganuma ^{DSP} |
| 99 | MF | JPN | Yosuke Ideguchi (on loan from Celtic) |

=== Out on loan ===
Note: Flags indicate national team as defined under FIFA eligibility rules; some limited exceptions apply. Players may hold more than one non-FIFA nationality.

| No. | Pos. | Nation | Player |
|---|---|---|---|
| — | MF | JPN | Yuji Kitajima (at Tokyo Verdy) |

== Transfers ==
Transfers in
| Join on | Pos. | Player | Moving from | Transfer type |
|---|---|---|---|---|
| 31 Mar | MF | (Japan) Masato Shigemi | (Japan) Fukuoka University | Loan transfer; 2023 DSP |
| 1 Mar | FW | (Brazil) Wellington | (Japan) Shonan Bellmare | Free transfer |
| Pre-season | GK | (Japan) Daiki Sakata | (Japan) Iwaki FC | Full transfer |
| Pre-season | GK | (Japan) Kazuaki Suganuma | (Japan) Fukuoka University | Loan transfer; 2023 DSP |
| Pre-season | DF | (Japan) Itsuki Oda | (Japan) Kashima Antlers | Full transfer |
| Pre-season | DF | (Japan) Masashi Kamekawa | (Japan) Yokohama FC | Full transfer |
| Pre-season | MF | (Japan) Kazuya Konno | (Japan) FC Tokyo | Full transfer |
| Pre-season | MF | (Japan) Yosuke Ideguchi | (Scotland) Celtic FC | Loan transfer |
| Pre-season | FW | (Japan) Ryoga Sato | (Japan) Tokyo Verdy | Full transfer |
| Pre-season | FW | (Japan) Reiju Tsuruno | (Japan) Fukuoka University | Full transfer |

Transfers out
| Leave on | Pos. | Player | Moving to | Transfer type |
|---|---|---|---|---|
| Pre-season | GK | (Japan) Rikihiro Sugiyama | – | Retirement |
| Pre-season | DF | (Japan) Takaaki Shichi | (Japan) Sanfrecce Hiroshima | Full transfer |
| Pre-season | DF | (Japan) Yuta Kumamoto | (Japan) Montedio Yamagata | Full transfer |
| Pre-season | DF | (Japan) Toshiki Toya | (Japan) Kochi United | Free transfer |
| Pre-season | DF | (Japan) Kaito Kuwahara | (Japan) Suzuka Point Getters | Free transfer |
| Pre-season | DF | (Japan) Naoki Wako | – | Retirement |
| Pre-season | MF | (Belgium) Jordy Croux | (Japan) Cerezo Osaka | Full transfer |
| Pre-season | MF | (Japan) Yuji Kitajima | (Japan) Tokyo Verdy | Loan transfer |
| Pre-season | FW | (Cameroon) John Mary | (Turkey) Çaykur Rizespor | Full transfer |
| Pre-season | FW | (Japan) Daiki Watari | (Japan) Tokushima Vortis | Full transfer |
| Pre-season | FW | (Spain) Juanma | (Japan) V-Varen Nagasaki | Full transfer |

== Competitions ==
=== Overview ===
| Competition | First match | Last match | Starting round | Final position | Record | | | | | | | |
| Competition | First match | Last match | Starting round | Final position | Pld | W | D | L | GF | GA | GD | Win % |
|---|---|---|---|---|---|---|---|---|---|---|---|---|
| J1 League | 18 February 2023 | 12 November 2023 | Matchday 1 | | 33 | 15 | 12 | 6 | 37 | 42 | −5 | 45.45 |
| Emperor's Cup | 7 June 2023 | 8 October 2023 | Second round | Semi-finals | 5 | 4 | 0 | 1 | 13 | 8 | +5 | 80.00 |
| J.League Cup | 8 March 2023 | 4 November 2023 | Group stage | Winners | 10 | 7 | 1 | 2 | 13 | 7 | +6 | 70.00 |
| Total | | | | | 48 | 26 | 13 | 9 | 63 | 57 | +6 | 54.17 |

Last updated: 11 November 2023
Source: Soccerway

=== J1 League ===
==== League table ====
| Pos | Team | Pld | W | D | L | GF | GA | GD | Pts | Qualification or relegation |
|---|---|---|---|---|---|---|---|---|---|---|
| 5 | Kashima Antlers | 34 | 14 | 10 | 10 | 43 | 34 | +9 | 52 | |
| 6 | Nagoya Grampus | 34 | 14 | 10 | 10 | 41 | 36 | +5 | 52 | |
| 7 | Avispa Fukuoka | 34 | 15 | 6 | 13 | 37 | 43 | −6 | 51 | |
| 8 | Kawasaki Frontale | 34 | 14 | 8 | 12 | 51 | 45 | +6 | 50 | Qualification for the AFC Champions League Elite league stage (Note: Qualified as the 2023 Emperor's Cup winners.) |
| 9 | Cerezo Osaka | 34 | 15 | 4 | 15 | 39 | 34 | +5 | 49 | |

Source: JLeague.jp, J.League Data Site
Rules for classification: 1) Points; 2) Goal difference; 3) Goals scored; 4) Head-to-head points; 5) Head-to-head goal difference; 6) Head-to-head goals scored; 7) Fewer disciplinary points.

==== Results summary ====
| Overall | | | | | | | | Home | | | | | | Away | | | | | |
| Pld | W | D | L | GF | GA | GD | Pts | W | D | L | GF | GA | GD | W | D | L | GF | GA | GD |
|---|---|---|---|---|---|---|---|---|---|---|---|---|---|---|---|---|---|---|---|
| 33 | 15 | 6 | 12 | 37 | 42 | −5 | 51 | 8 | 3 | 5 | 15 | 17 | −2 | 7 | 3 | 7 | 22 | 25 | −3 |

Last updated: 25 November 2023.
Source: See matches

==== Matches ====
The league fixtures were announced on 20 January 2023.

| 18 February 1 | Vissel Kobe | 1–0 | Avispa Fukuoka | Kobe |
| 14:00 | Jean Patric 70' (yellow card) 90+5' | Report | Nara (yellow card) 21'; Lukian (yellow card) 72' | Stadium: Noevir Stadium; Attendance: 18,981; Referee: Yoshiro Imamura |

| 25 February 2 | Avispa Fukuoka | 2–1 | Cerezo Osaka | Fukuoka |
| 15:00 | Mae 47'; Oda (yellow card) 62'; Miya (yellow card) 67'; Kanamori 88' | Report | Uejo 59'; Tameda (yellow card) 78' | Stadium: Best Denki Stadium; Attendance: 9,607; Referee: Futoshi Nakamura |

| 4 March 3 | Avispa Fukuoka | 1–0 | Kashiwa Reysol | Fukuoka |
| 15:00 | Lukian 87' | Report | Shiihashi (yellow card) 72' | Stadium: Best Denki Stadium; Attendance: 6,210; Referee: Ryo Tanimoto |

| 12 March 4 | Kashima Antlers | 0–0 | Avispa Fukuoka | Kashima |
| 15:00 | Sano (yellow card) 14' (yellow-red card) 53' | Report | Kanamori (yellow card) 41'; Grolli (yellow card) 55'; Nagaishi (yellow card) 65'; Lukian (yellow card) 80' | Stadium: Kashima Soccer Stadium; Attendance: 20,097; Referee: Yudai Yamamoto |

| 19 March 5 | Avispa Fukuoka | 2–1 | Shonan Bellmare | Fukuoka |
| 14:00 | Douglas Grolli (yellow card) 44'; Nara (yellow card) 57'; Yamagishi 90+6', 90+9' | Report | Oiwa (yellow card) 42'; Abe (yellow card) 60'; Onose 73' | Stadium: Best Denki Stadium; Attendance: 6,455; Referee: Akihiko Ikeuchi |

| 1 April 6 | Yokohama FC | 1–1 | Avispa Fukuoka | Yokohama |
| 14:00 | Kondo (yellow card) 38'; Caprini (yellow card) 42'; Ogawa 45+9' (pen.); Yoshino (yellow card) 88' | Report | Yamagishi 16'; Oda (yellow card) 75'; Wellington (yellow card) 90+1' | Stadium: Mitsuzawa Stadium; Attendance: 4,876; Referee: Hiroki Kasahara |

| 9 April 7 | Avispa Fukuoka | 2–1 | Kyoto Sanga | Fukuoka |
| 15:03 | Lukian 78'; Wellington 82' | Report | Kinoshita (yellow card) 36'; Patric 56' | Stadium: Best Denki Stadium; Attendance: 6,341; Referee: Koichiro Fukushima |

| 15 April 8 | Albirex Niigata | 3–2 | Avispa Fukuoka | Niigata |
| 14:00 | Ito 47', 90+3', 90+5' | Report | Konno 17' (pen.); Oda 32' | Stadium: Denka Big Swan Stadium; Attendance: 16,692; Referee: Ryo Tanimoto |

| 23 April 9 | Consadole Sapporo | 2–2 | Avispa Fukuoka | Sapporo |
| 14:00 | Arano 5' (yellow card) 90+5'; Asano 13' | Report | Mikuni (yellow card) 45+3'; Yamagishi 51'; Lukian 58' (pen.); Yuzawa 74' | Stadium: Sapporo Dome; Attendance: 12,495; Referee: Hiroyuki Kimura |

| 29 April 10 | Avispa Fukuoka | 1–3 | Kawasaki Frontale | Fukuoka |
| 17:03 | Tanabe (yellow card) 26'; Tsuruno 85'; Douglas Grolli (yellow card) 90+5' | Report | Noborizato 12'; Miyashiro 47'; Seko (yellow card) 63'; Nara 65' (o.g.) | Stadium: Best Denki Stadium; Attendance: 9,053; Referee: Yudai Yamamoto |

| 3 May 11 | Avispa Fukuoka | 1–0 | FC Tokyo | Fukuoka |
| 15:03 | Yamagishi 72' | Report | Nagatomo (yellow card) 36' | Stadium: Best Denki Stadium; Attendance: 10,360; Referee: Koei Koya |

| 7 May 12 | Sanfrecce Hiroshima | 3–1 | Avispa Fukuoka | Hiroshima |
| 13:01 | Ben Khalifa (yellow card) 27'; Sotiriou 50'; Yamagishi 72' (o.g.); Kawamura 89' | Report | Oda (yellow card) 11'; Yamagishi 30'; Maejima (yellow card) 54' | Stadium: Edion Stadium Hiroshima; Attendance: 10,415; Referee: Ryo Tanimoto |

| 14 May 13 | Avispa Fukuoka | 0–0 | Sagan Tosu | Fukuoka |
| 13:30 | Lukian (yellow card) 25' | Report | Iwasaki (yellow card) 35'; Naganuma (red card) 45+1'; Kawata (yellow card) 87'; Horigome (yellow card) 90+2' | Stadium: Best Denki Stadium; Attendance: 13,719; Referee: Hiroki Kasahara |

| 20 May 14 | Avispa Fukuoka | 0–0 | Urawa Red Diamonds | Fukuoka |
| 13:00 | Shigemi (yellow card) 72' | Report | Yasui (yellow card) 42' | Stadium: Best Denki Stadium; Attendance: 10,417; Referee: Hayato Shimizu |

| 28 May 15 | Yokohama F. Marinos | 2–0 | Avispa Fukuoka | Yokohama |
| 14:00 | Anderson Lopes 8', 20'; Kamijima (yellow card) 51'; Eduardo (yellow card) 90+4' | Report | Douglas Grolli (yellow card) 64' | Stadium: Nissan Stadium; Attendance: 26,115; Referee: Yoshimi Yamashita |

| 3 June 16 | Avispa Fukuoka | 1–2 | Gamba Osaka | Fukuoka |
| 18:00 | Yamagishi 17'; Wellington (yellow card) 90+6' | Report | Juan Alano 24'; Miura 32'; Sato (yellow card) 54'; Fukuoka (yellow card) 90+6' | Stadium: Best Denki Stadium; Attendance: 9,336; Referee: Koichiro Fukushima |

| 11 June 17 | Nagoya Grampus | 2–1 | Avispa Fukuoka | Nagoya |
| 16:00 | Mateus Castro 45' (pen.); Junker 69' | Report | Mae (yellow card) 19'; Maejima (yellow card) 43'; Sato 65' (pen.) | Stadium: Toyota Stadium; Attendance: 13,992; Referee: Shu Kawamata |

| 25 June 18 | Avispa Fukuoka | 0–3 | Vissel Kobe | Fukuoka |
| 19:00 | Yamagishi (yellow card) 50'; Nara (yellow card) 73'; Maejima (yellow card) 80' | Report | Osako 22'; Muto 60', 87' | Stadium: Best Denki Stadium; Attendance: 11,697; Referee: Yudai Yamamoto |

| 30 June 19 | Cerezo Osaka | 0–1 | Avispa Fukuoka | Osaka |
| 19:00 | | Report | Lukian 22'; Mae (yellow card) 54'; Wellington (yellow card) 90+3' | Stadium: Yodoko Sakura Stadium; Attendance: 11,786; Referee: Hayato Shimizu |

| 8 July 20 | Avispa Fukuoka | 2–1 | Hokkaido Consadole Sapporo | Fukuoka |
| 19:03 | Wellington 66'; Yuzawa 69' | Report | Supachok 31' | Stadium: Best Denki Stadium; Attendance: 7,170; Referee: Akihiko Ikeuchi |

| 16 July 21 | Shonan Bellmare | 0–1 | Avispa Fukuoka | Hiratsuka |
| 19:03 | | Report | Grolli 86' | Stadium: Lemon Gas Stadium Hiratsuka; Attendance: 9,878; Referee: Takafumi Mikuriya |

| 6 August 22 | Sagan Tosu | 0–1 | Avispa Fukuoka | Tosu |
| 19:08 | | Report | Kanamori 45' | Stadium: Ekimae Real Estate Stadium; Attendance: 17,799; Referee: Yuichi Nishimura |

| 12 August 23 | Avispa Fukuoka | 2–0 | Yokohama FC | Fukuoka |
| 19:03 | Sato 2', 48' | Report | | Stadium: Best Denki Stadium; Attendance: 8,677; Referee: Ryo Tanimoto |

| 18 August 24 | Avispa Fukuoka | 0–1 | Albirex Niigata | Fukuoka |
| 19:03 | | Report | Maejima 19' (o.g.) | Stadium: Best Denki Stadium; Attendance: 7,705; Referee: Futoshi Nakamura |

| 26 August 25 | Kyoto Sanga | 2–0 | Avispa Fukuoka | Kyoto |
| 19:03 | Hara 14', 24'; Appiah Tawiah (red card) 36' | Report | | Stadium: Sanga Stadium by Kyocera; Attendance: 9,830; Referee: Koei Koya |

| 3 September 26 | FC Tokyo | 1–2 | Avispa Fukuoka | Tokyo |
| 19:03 | Kumata 86' | Report | Sato 2'; Yamagishi 11' | Stadium: Ajinomoto Stadium; Attendance: 16,068; Referee: Koichiro Fukushima |

| 16 September 27 | Avispa Fukuoka | 1–0 | Nagoya Grampus | Fukuoka |
| 19:05 | Wellington 84' | Report | | Stadium: Best Denki Stadium; Attendance: 7,647; Referee: Takafumi Mikuriya |

| 23 September 28 | Kashiwa Reysol | 1–3 | Avispa Fukuoka | Kashiwa |
| 19:04 | Diego 13' | Report | Konno 54', 56'; Kanamori 65' | Stadium: Sankyo Frontier Kashiwa Stadium; Attendance: 10,770; Referee: Yuichi Nishimura |

| 30 September 29 | Avispa Fukuoka | 0–0 | Kashima Antlers | Fukuoka |
| 15:03 | | Report | | Stadium: Best Denki Stadium; Attendance: 9,467; Referee: Hajime Matsuo |

| 20 October 30 | Kawasaki Frontale | 4–2 | Avispa Fukuoka | Kawasaki |
| 19:03 | Segawa 20'; Kobayashi 84'; Tono 90+2'; Miyashiro 90+6' | Report | Grolli 24'; Yamagishi 66' | Stadium: Kawasaki Todoroki Stadium; Attendance: 19,026; Referee: Takafumi Mikuriya |

| 28 October 31 | Avispa Fukuoka | 0–4 | Yokohama F. Marinos | Fukuoka |
| 14:03 | | Report | Lopes 19', 25'; Uenaka 48'; Miyaichi 90+9' | Stadium: Best Denki Stadium; Attendance: 13,855; Referee: Koei Koya |

| 11 November 32 | Gamba Osaka | 1–2 | Avispa Fukuoka | Osaka |
| 15:03 | Kwon 13' | Report | Yamagishi 46'; Lukian 89' | Stadium: Panasonic Stadium Suita; Attendance: 21,293; Referee: Akihiko Ikeuchi |

| 24 November 33 | Urawa Red Diamonds | 2–3 | Avispa Fukuoka | Saitama |
| 14:04 | Scholz 18' (pen.); Akimoto 75' | Report | Konno 32', 62'; Oda 54' | Stadium: Saitama Stadium 2002; Attendance: 34,826; Referee: Masuya Ueda |

| 2 December 34 | Avispa Fukuoka | v | Sanfrecce Hiroshima | Fukuoka |
| --:-- | | | | Stadium: Best Denki Stadium |

=== Emperor's Cup ===
As Avispa is a J1 club, it started the competition in the second round.

| 7 June Second round | Avispa Fukuoka | 2–0 | FC Imabari | Fukuoka |
| 19:00 | Wellington 51' (yellow card) 70'; Inoue (yellow card) 67'; Sato 80' | Report | Ichihara (yellow card) 8'; Teruyama (yellow card) 58' | Stadium: Best Denki Stadium; Attendance: 2,033; Referee: Futoshi Nakamura |

| 12 July Third round | Avispa Fukuoka | 2–1 (a.e.t.) | FC Gifu | Gifu |
| 19:00 JST | Sato 84'; Grolli 114' | Report; Report | Hada 40' | Stadium: Gifu Nagaragawa Stadium; Attendance: 2,010; Referee: Koei Koya |

| 2 August Round of 16 | Tochigi SC | 2–4 (a.e.t.) | Avispa Fukuoka | Utsunomiya |
| 19:00 JST | Nemoto 45+3' (pen.), 51' | Report; Report | Sato 20'; Wellington 54'; Lukian 114'; Yamagishi 117' | Stadium: Kanseki Stadium Tochigi; Attendance: 2,368; Referee: Kazuyoshi Enomoto |

| 30 August Quarter-final | Avispa Fukuoka | 3–1 | Shonan Bellmare | Fukuoka |
| 19:00 JST | Yamagishi 44', 67'; Sato 73' | Report; Report | Suzuki 4' | Stadium: Best Denki Stadium; Attendance: 3,325; Referee: Hiroki Kasahara |

| 8 October Semi-final | Kawasaki Frontale | 4–2 | Avispa Fukuoka | Kawasaki |
| 13:10 JST | Yamamura 5'; Tachibanada 53'; Marcinho 70'; Damião 81' | Report; Report | Kanamori 42'; Tsuruno 90+6' | Stadium: Kawasaki Todoroki Stadium; Attendance: 18,547; Referee: Futoshi Nakamura |

=== J.League Cup ===
| Pos | Team | Pld | W | D | L | GF | GA | GD | Pts | Qualification |
|---|---|---|---|---|---|---|---|---|---|---|
| 1 | Avispa Fukuoka | 6 | 4 | 1 | 1 | 9 | 6 | +3 | 13 | Advance to knockout stage |
| 2 | Kashima Antlers | 6 | 3 | 1 | 2 | 6 | 4 | +2 | 10 | Advance to knockout stage |
| 3 | Albirex Niigata | 6 | 2 | 0 | 4 | 6 | 8 | −2 | 6 | |
| 4 | Kashiwa Reysol | 6 | 1 | 2 | 3 | 7 | 10 | −3 | 5 | |

Source: JLeague.co (EN), JLeague.jp (JA)
Rules for classification: Tiebreakers

| 8 March | Avispa Fukuoka | 1–0 | Albirex Niigata | Fukuoka |
| 19:03 | Sato (yellow card) 42'; Tsuruno 59' | Report | | Stadium: Best Denki Stadium; Attendance: 3,092; Referee: Hayato Shimizu |

| 26 March | Avispa Fukuoka | 3–3 | Kashiwa Reysol | Fukuoka |
| 15:03 | Yamagishi 29'; Lukian 79'; Yuzawa 90' | Report | Tsuchiya 13'; Grot 16', 67' | Stadium: Best Denki Stadium; Attendance: 3,611; Referee: Kazuyoshi Enomoto |

| 5 April | Kashima Antlers | 1–0 | Avispa Fukuoka | Kashima |
| 19:03 | Araki 32' | Report | Douglas Grolli (yellow card) 63' | Stadium: Kashima Soccer Stadium; Attendance: 5,571; Referee: Hayato Shimizu |

| 19 April | Avispa Fukuoka | 2–1 | Kashima Antlers | Fukuoka |
| 19:00 | Jogo 14'; Douglas Grolli (yellow card) 85'; Wellington 90+3' | Report | Arthur Caíke 31'; Sekigawa (yellow card) 90' | Stadium: Best Denki Stadium; Attendance: 3,520; Referee: Masuya Ueda |

| 24 May | Albirex Niigata | 1–2 | Avispa Fukuoka | Niigata |
| 19:00 | Gustavo Nescau 4' | Report | Jogo (yellow card) 36'; Mikuni (yellow card) 46'; Inoue (yellow card) 54'; Mae (yellow card) 71'; Tsuruno 77'; Oda 86' | Stadium: Denka Big Swan Stadium; Attendance: 7,879; Referee: Takuto Okabe |

| 18 June 2023 | Kashiwa Reysol | 0–1 | Avispa Fukuoka | Kashiwa |
| 18:00 | Mitsumaru (yellow card) 86' | Report | Wellington 12'; Mikuni (yellow card) 39'; Nagaishi (yellow card) 56' | Stadium: Sankyo Frontier Kashiwa Stadium; Attendance: 4,986; Referee: Hajime Matsuo |

==== Quarter-finals ====
| 6 September Leg 1 | FC Tokyo | 1–0 | Avispa Fukuoka | Tokyo |
| 19:03 | Adaílton 16' | Report | | Stadium: Ajinomoto Stadium; Attendance: 5,565; Referee: Hayato Shimizu |

| 10 September Leg 2 | Avispa Fukuoka | 2–0 | FC Tokyo | Fukuoka |
| 19:03 | Yamagishi 38'; Oda 45+3' | Report | | Stadium: Best Denki Stadium; Attendance: 8,659; Referee: Yudai Yamamoto |

Avispa Fukuoka won 2–1 on aggregate.

==== Semi-finals ====
| 11 October Leg 1 | Avispa Fukuoka | 1–0 | Nagoya Grampus | Fukuoka |
| 19:03 | Tsuruno 45+3' | Report | | Stadium: Best Denki Stadium; Attendance: 6,980; Referee: Jumpei Iida |

| 15 October Leg 2 | Nagoya Grampus | 0–1 | Avispa Fukuoka | Toyota |
| 15:03 | | Report | Wellington 5' | Stadium: Toyota Stadium; Attendance: 24,876; Referee: Yoshiro Imamura |

Avispa Fukuoka won 2–0 on aggregate.

=== Final ===
| 4 November | Avispa Fukuoka | 2–1 | Urawa Red Diamonds | Tokyo |
| 13:12 JST | Mae 5'; Miya 45+4' | JLeague.co (EN); JLeague.jp (JA) | Akimoto 67' | Stadium: Japan National Stadium; Attendance: 61,683; Referee: Futoshi Nakamura |
