= 2023 J.League Cup final =

2023JリーグYBCルヴァンカップ 決勝
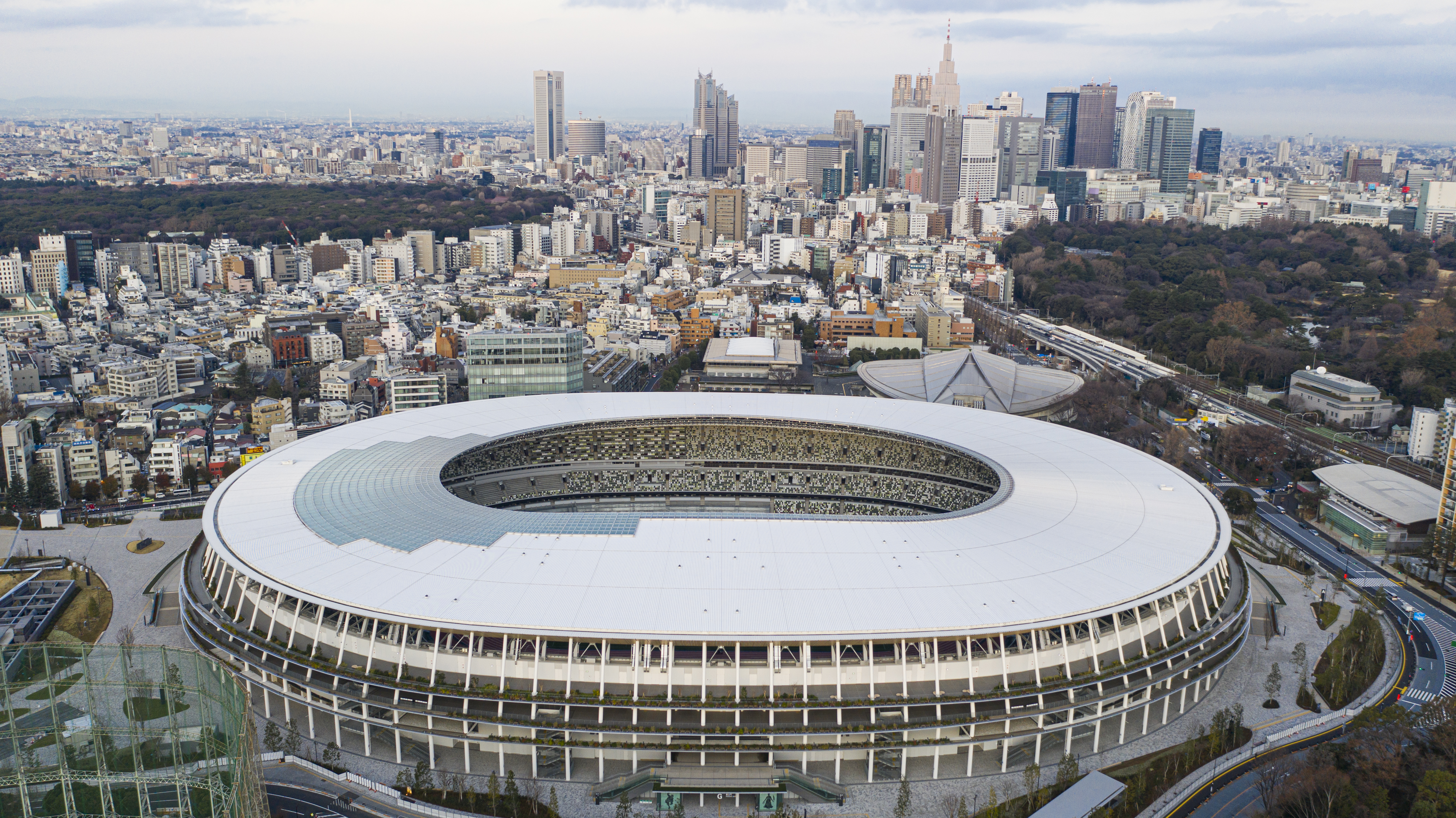
- The match took place at Japan National Stadium
- Event: 2023 J.League Cup
Avispa Fukuoka	Urawa Red Diamonds
2	1
- Date: 4 November 2023
- Venue: National Stadium, Tokyo
- Man of the Match: Hiroyuki Mae
- Referee: Futoshi Nakamura
- Attendance: 61,683
- Weather: Sunny; 24.1 °C (75.4 °F); 59% humidity

The 2023 J.League Cup final was an association football match between Avispa Fukuoka and Urawa Red Diamonds on 4 November 2023 at Japan National Stadium. It was the 31st edition J.League Cup, organised by the J.League. Avispa Fukuoka were appearing in their first J.League Cup final, after making it as far as the semi-final in 2022. Urawa Red Diamonds were playing in their seventh J.League Cup final, previously winning the competition in both 2003 and 2016.

Futoshi Nakamura was the referee for the match, which was played in front of 61,683 spectators. Avispa took an early lead after just five minutes, with Hiroyuki Mae turning in Kazuya Konno's cross from the right-hand side. Avispa doubled their lead just before half-time, with Daiki Miya scoring from a low across into the box. In the second half, Avispa earned a penalty but this was saved by Shusaku Nishikawa and kept Urawa in the match. The Reds finally made a breakthrough in the 67th minute through Takahiro Akimoto, but it was to be no more than consolation as Avispa hung on to the lead until the final whistle, claiming their first major title in the club's history.

== Teams ==
Team	League	Previous finals appearances (bold indicates winners)
Avispa Fukuoka	J1 League	0
Urawa Red Diamonds	J1 League	6 (2002, **2003**, 2004, 2011, 2013, **2016**)

== Route to the final ==
The tournament consisted of all 18 J1 League teams as well as the top two relegated teams from the 2022 season, beginning with a home-and-away round-robin group stage consisting of five groups of four teams. Each group winners and the three best-placed runners-up qualified to the quarter-finals.

Avispa Fukuoka				Round	Urawa Red Diamonds			
Opponent	Result			Group stage	Opponent	Result		
Albirex Niigata	1–0 (H)			Matchday 1	Shonan Bellmare	0–0 (A)		
Kashiwa Reysol	3–3 (H)			Matchday 2	Shimizu S-Pulse	1–1 (H)		
Kashima Antlers	1–0 (A)			Matchday 3	Kawasaki Frontale	0–0 (A)		
Kashima Antlers	2–1 (H)			Matchday 4	Shonan Bellmare	1–1 (H)		
Albirex Niigata	1–2 (A)			Matchday 5	Kawasaki Frontale	2–1 (H)		
Kashiwa Reysol	0–1 (A)			Matchday 6	Shimizu S-Pulse	1–1 (A)		
**Group D winners**: Pos / Team / Pld / Pts; 1 / **Avispa Fukuoka** / 6 / **13**; 2 / Kashima Antlers / 6 / **10**; 3 / Albirex Niigata / 6 / **6**; 4 / Kashiwa Reysol / 6 / **5**; Source: League table, Match results				Final standings	**Group B winners**: Pos / Team / Pld / Pts; 1 / **Urawa Red Diamonds** / 6 / **8**; 2 / Shimizu S-Pulse / 6 / **8**; 3 / Kawasaki Frontale / 6 / **8**; 4 / Shonan Bellmare / 6 / **6**; Source: League table, Match results			
Opponent	Agg.	1st leg	2nd leg	Knockout stage	Opponent	Agg.	1st leg	2nd leg
FC Tokyo	2–1	1–0 (A)	2–0 (H)	Quarter-finals	Gamba Osaka	4–0	0–1 (A)	3–0 (H)
Nagoya Grampus	2–0	1–0 (H)	0–1 (A)	Semi-finals	Yokohama F. Marinos	2–1	1–0 (A)	2–0 (H)

== Pre-match ==
=== Venue selection ===
The final was hosted at National Stadium, the second consecutive year the final was played at the newly constructed stadium.

=== Analysis ===
The final was Avispa's first, their previous best being the exit at the semi-final stage of the competition in the previous year. Urawa were also knocked out at the semi-final stage of the 2022 J.League Cup and last won it in 2016. In their only previous encounter in the 2023 season, the two teams played out a 0–0 draw in May. This match was Urawa's second final of the season, after winning the AFC Champions League in April.

Both teams would be relying on their defences, with Urawa only conceding 5 goals in their 10 J.League Cup games and Avispa conceding 7.

The last three meetings between the teams had ended in draws, and Avispa had only beaten Urawa once in their history.

Before the match, Urawa manager Maciej Skorża highlighted Fukuoka's counter-attacking ability as a reason the game will be difficult, calling them a "well-organised team".

Fukuoka captain Tatsuki Nara said it would be a special match for the club and that it will be important to not get caught up in the atmosphere.

== Match ==
Avispa Fukuoka lined up in a 3-4-2-1 formation, staying with Takumi Nagaishi in goal as they had done for all of their cup games this season. Top-scorer Yuya Yamagishi started up front, just in front of Kazuya Konno and the Avispa's player with the most minutes played this season, Hiroyuki Mae. Semi-final goalscorer Wellington could only make the bench. Tatsuki Nara captained the side.

Urawa Reds started with their AFC Champions League winning centre-back pairing of Alexander Scholz and Marius Høibråten. Scholz also scored two penalties in the semi-final against Yokohama F. Marinos. They lined up in a 4-2-3-1 formation, with newly crowned J.League Cup "New Hero" Jumpei Hayakawa starting just behind top-scorer José Kanté. Atsuki Ito returned to the starting XI, after he missed the semi-final games due to representing the Japan national football team.

=== First half ===
Avispa started the game strongly and took the lead after five minutes. Kazuya Konno's cross across the box from the right-hand side found Hiroyuki Mae at the back post to score with a close-range finish. Taking the early lead, Avispa settled into a defensive block and didn't allow Urawa to create any chances, despite the Reds dominating possession. A long-range effort in the 35th minute by Ken Iwao was their first real attempt on goal. Towards the end of the half, Avispa began to create some chances, with Daiki Miya getting two strong headers on target. Right on the stroke of half-time, Avispa doubled their lead through Miya who turned in another Konno low cross – this time from the left – past a helpless Shusaku Nishikawa.

=== Second half ===
Avispa again started the half sharply and should have increased their lead further after Douglas Grolli was brought down by Urawa defender Marius Høibråten inside the box. However, Yuya Yamagishi's 58th-minute penalty was a poor effort and it was easily saved by Nishikawa. Urawa could have then had a penalty of their own, after Atsuki Ito was brought down in the box by Yota Maejima, but the referee waved play on. Avispa were content to try and defend tightly for the rest of the match, but after Urawa made some substitutions at the hour mark they began to create more chances. Only six minutes after coming off the bench, Takahiro Akimoto pulled one back for the Reds. Captain Hiroki Sakai launched a deep cross field pass from the right-hand side which Akimoto expertly controlled with his chest whilst holding off Masato Yuzawa and drilled a low, left-footed finish past Nagaishi. After Konno was stretched off in the 72nd minute, Urawa continued to pile pressure onto Avispa, with José Kanté's shot from outside the box drawing a diving save from Nagaishi and Douglas Grolli blocking Bryan Linssen from point-blank range. There were to be eight minutes of added time and Urawa were almost able to equalise through Kanté, whose 95th-minute shot from 20 yards beat the keeper but clipped the left post and went out, as Avsipa hung on to secure a historic win.

=== Details ===
4 November 2023
13:12 JST

Avispa Fukuoka	2–1	Urawa Red Diamonds
Mae 5'; Miya 45+4'	JLeague.co (EN); JLeague.jp (JA)	Akimoto 67'

Japan National Stadium, Tokyo
Attendance: 61,683
Referee: Futoshi Nakamura

GK	1	(Japan) Takumi Nagaishi	(yellow card) 81'
CB	33	(Brazil) Douglas Grolli	(yellow card) 45'
CB	3	(Japan) Tatsuki Nara (c)
CB	5	(Japan) Daiki Miya		(substituted off) 89'
RM	2	(Japan) Masato Yuzawa		(substituted off) 76'
CM	99	(Japan) Yosuke Ideguchi
CM	44	(Japan) Kimiya Moriyama		(substituted off) 46'
LM	29	(Japan) Yota Maejima
AM	8	(Japan) Kazuya Konno		(substituted off) 72'
AM	6	(Japan) Hiroyuki Mae
CF	11	(Japan) Yuya Yamagishi		(substituted off) 89'
Substitutes:
GK	31	(Japan) Masaaki Murakami
DF	16	(Japan) Itsuki Oda		(substituted on) 76'
DF	37	(Japan) Masaya Tashiro		(substituted on) 89'
MF	7	(Japan) Takeshi Kanamori		(substituted on) 46'
MF	17	(Japan) Shun Nakamura	(yellow card) 83'	(substituted on) 72'
FW	18	(Brazil) Wellington		(substituted on) 89'
FW	28	(Japan) Reiju Tsuruno
Manager:
(Japan) Shigetoshi Hasebe

GK	1	(Japan) Shūsaku Nishikawa
RB	2	(Japan) Hiroki Sakai (c)
CB	28	(Denmark) Alexander Scholz	(yellow card) 24'
CB	5	(Norway) Marius Høibråten
LB	26	(Japan) Takuya Ogiwara	(yellow card) 90+7'
CM	3	(Japan) Atsuki Ito		(substituted off) 61'
CM	19	(Japan) Ken Iwao		(substituted off) 80'
RW	18	(Japan) Toshiki Takahashi		(substituted off) 46'
AM	35	(Japan) Junpei Hayakawa		(substituted off) 46'
LM	8	(Japan) Yoshio Koizumi		(substituted off) 61'
CF	11	(Guinea) José Kanté
Substitutes:
GK	16	(Japan) Ayumi Niekawa
DF	4	(Japan) Takuya Iwanami
MF	15	(Japan) Takahiro Akimoto		(substituted on) 61'
MF	21	(Japan) Tomoaki Ōkubo		(substituted on) 46'
MF	25	(Japan) Kaito Yasui		(substituted on) 46'
MF	27	(Thailand) Ekanit Panya		(substituted on) 80'
FW	9	(Netherlands) Bryan Linssen		(substituted on) 61'
Manager:
(Poland) Maciej Skorża

Assistant referees:
Isao Nishihashi
Osamu Nomura
Fourth official:
Koichiro Fukushima
Video assistant referee:
Hiroki Kasahara
Assistant video assistant referee:
Yosuke Takebe

**Match rules**

- 90 minutes.
- 30 minutes of extra-time if necessary.
- Penalty shoot-out if scores still level.
- Seven named substitutes.
- Maximum of five substitutions.

=== Statistics ===
Statistic	Avispa Fukuoka	Urawa Red Diamonds
Goals scored	2	1
Total shots	8	8
Corner kicks	5	4
Freekicks	12	13
Yellow cards	3	2
Red cards	0	0

== Post-match ==
By winning the match, Avispa Fukuoka won their first piece of silverware in the club's history, in their first finals appearance. They became the third consecutive new winners of the tournament, following Nagoya Grampus in 2021 and Sanfrecce Hiroshima in 2022. Shigetoshi Hasebe, the winning coach, said "I think we were on the cusp of becoming a team that wouldn't win a title for many years, but today we won. Because of that, history has changed. I think the club has changed in direction and is aiming for the top". His opposite number, Maciej Skorża called the start of the game for his team "terrible". He said "The fact that we conceded a goal in the first five minutes of the final match means that something went wrong in our mental preparation before the match. After conceding a goal, we tried to keep the ball better and change the momentum, but we became nervous."

Avispa captain Tatsuki Nara said "We weren't good or brilliant. However, everyone put their hearts into it and fought like an Avispa until the very end. I'm happy to have won." Urawa captain Hiroki Sakai said "I feel nothing but frustration."

The monetary reward to Avispa Fukuoka for winning the trophy was ¥150,000,000, with runners-up Urawa Red Diamonds awarded ¥50,000,000.

For his performance and goal in the final, Hiroyuki Mae was awarded the MVP award and received a prize of ¥1,000,000.
