= Okino =

Okino (written: 沖野) is a Japanese surname. Notable people with the surname include:

- Hitoshi Okino (沖野 等, 1959–2009), Japanese footballer and manager
- Masaki Okino (沖野 将基, born 1996), Japanese footballer

== Fictional characters ==
- Okino (Ninjago), a character in Ninjago
- Yoko Okino (沖野 ヨーコ), a character in the manga series Case Closed

== Other people ==
- Betty Okino (born 1975), American actress and gymnast

== See also ==
- Okino coal mine, a coal mine in Buryatia, Russia
