= Lukian =

Lukian is a given name, variant of Lucian. Notable people with the name include:

- Lukian Popov (1873–1914), Russian genre painter
- Lukian (footballer) (born 1991), Lukian Araújo de Almeida, Brazilian footballer
- Lukian Kobylytsia (1812 – 1851) was a Ukrainian Bukovinian farmer, activist, and leader of uprisings

== See also ==
- Lukiano
- Lukin
- Luchian
