= Luchian =

Luchian is a Romanian surname derived from the given name of Greek origin, Lucian. Notable people with the surname include:

- Cătălin Luchian, Romanian sports sailor
- Ioan Luchian Mihalea, Romanian composer
- Ștefan Luchian, Romanian painter
- Octavian Luchian (1903–1981), Romanian numismatist

== See also ==
- Lukian
