= Ryoga Sato =

Japanese footballer

Ryoga Sato 佐藤 凌我
Personal information
- Date of birth: 20 February 1999 (age 27)
- Place of birth: Fukuoka, Japan
- Height: 1.78 m (5 ft 10 in)
- Position: Forward

Team information
- Current team: Fagiano Okayama (on loan from Júbilo Iwata)
- Number: 19

Youth career
- FC Ryunan
- 2011–2013: Jiromaru Junior High School
- 2014–2016: Higashi Fukuoka High School

College career
Years	Team	Apps	(Gls)
2017–2020	Meiji University		

Senior career*
Years	Team	Apps	(Gls)
2021–2022	Tokyo Verdy	82	(26)
2023–2024	Avispa Fukuoka	45	(6)
2025–	Júbilo Iwata	48	(6)
2026–	→ Fagiano Okayama (loan)	0	(0)
- * Club domestic league appearances and goals as of 09:35, 5 October 2026 (UTC)

Ryoga Sato (佐藤 凌我, Satō Ryōga; born 20 February 1999) is a Japanese professional footballer who plays as a forward for J1 League club Fagiano Okayama, on loan from Júbilo Iwata.

== Career statistics ==
=== Club ===
As of 5 October 2026.

Appearances and goals by club, season and competition
Club	Season	League			National cup (Note: Includes Emperor's Cup)		League cup (Note: Includes J.League Cup)		Other		Total	
Club	Season	Division	Apps	Goals	Apps	Goals	Apps	Goals	Apps	Goals	Apps	Goals
Meiji University	2019	–			2	0	–		–		2	0
Tokyo Verdy	2021	J2 League	42	13	1	0	–		–		43	13
Tokyo Verdy	2022	J2 League	40	13	3	2	–		–		43	15
Tokyo Verdy	Total		82	26	4	2	0	0	0	0	86	28
Avispa Fukuoka	2023	J1 League	24	4	4	4	6	0	–		34	8
Avispa Fukuoka	2024	J1 League	21	2	2	0	1	0	–		24	2
Avispa Fukuoka	Total		45	6	6	4	7	0	0	0	58	10
Júbilo Iwata	2025	J2 League	30	4	1	0	4	2	1 (Note: Appearance in J1/J2 play-offs)	1	36	7
Júbilo Iwata	2026	J2/J3 (100)	18	2	–		–		0	0	18	2
Júbilo Iwata	2026–27	J2 League	0	0	0	0	1	0	0	0	1	0
Júbilo Iwata	Total		48	6	1	0	5	2	1	1	55	9
Fagiano Okayama (loan)	2026–27	J1 League	0	0	–		0	0	–		0	0
Career total			175	38	13	6	12	2	1	1	201	47
