= Kaito Kuwahara =

Japanese footballer

Personal information
- Date of birth: 5 October 2000 (age 26)
- Place of birth: Fukuoka, Fukuoka, Japan
- Height: 1.68 m (5 ft 6 in)
- Position: Left-back

Team information
- Current team: Atletico Suzuka Club
- Number: 41

Youth career
- Miyake SSC
- –2018: Avispa Fukuoka

Senior career*
Years	Team	Apps	(Gls)
2019–2023	Avispa Fukuoka	6	(0)
2021-2023	Renofa Yamaguchi (Loan)	19	(0)
2023-	Atletico Suzuka Club	25	(0)
Total		50	(0)
- * Club domestic league appearances and goals as of 17:04, 1 October 2020 (UTC)

Kaito Kuwahara (桑原 海人, Kuwahara Kaito; born 5 October 2000) is a Japanese footballer currently playing as a left-back for Renofa Yamaguchi FC.

== Club career ==
Nakagawa made his professional debut on 3 July 2019 in an Emperor's Cup game against Kagoshima United.

== Career statistics ==
=== Club ===
As of 1 October 2020.

Club	Season	League			National Cup		League Cup		Other		Total	
Club	Season	Division	Apps	Goals	Apps	Goals	Apps	Goals	Apps	Goals	Apps	Goals
Avispa Fukuoka	2019	J2 League	0	0	1 (Note: Appearance(s) in Emperor's Cup)	0	0	0	0	0	1	0
Avispa Fukuoka	2020	J2 League	1	0	0	0	0	0	0	0	1	0
Career total			1	0	1	0	0	0	0	0	2	0
