= Takayuki Mae =

Japanese footballer (born 1993)

Takayuki Mae 前 貴之
Personal information
- Full name: Takayuki Mae
- Date of birth: 16 September 1993 (age 33)
- Place of birth: Sapporo, Japan
- Height: 1.72 m (5 ft 8 in)
- Positions: Right back; centre back

Team information
- Current team: JEF United Chiba
- Number: 15

Youth career
- –2010: Consadole Sapporo

Senior career*
Years	Team	Apps	(Gls)
2011–2017	Consadole Sapporo	40	(0)
2014	→ Kataller Toyama (loan)	14	(3)
2015	→ J. League U-22 (loan)	1	(0)
2017	→ Renofa Yamaguchi (loan)	24	(2)
2018–2019	Renofa Yamaguchi	77	(4)
2020	Yokohama F. Marinos	0	(0)
2020	→ Matsumoto Yamaga (loan)	24	(1)
2021–2022	Matsumoto Yamaga	44	(1)
2022–2024	Renofa Yamaguchi	82	(1)
2025–	JEF United Chiba	44	(0)
- * Club domestic league appearances and goals as of 12 August 2026

Takayuki Mae (前 貴之, Mae Takayuki; born September 16, 1993) also known as Chamaesama, is a Japanese football player who plays as a defender and currently play for JEF United Chiba.

== Career ==
=== Consadole Sapporo ===
On 6 January 2015, it was announced that Mae's contract would be renewed for the 2015 season.

=== Loan to J. League U-22 ===
Mae was called up to the J. League U-22 team to face Fujieda MYFC on 18 April 2015.

=== Loan to Renofa Yamaguchi ===
On 7 December 2016, Mae was announced at Renofa Yamaguchi on loan.

=== First spell at Renofa Yamaguchi ===
On 15 December 2017, Mae was announced at Renofa Yamaguchi on a permanent transfer.

=== Yokohama F. Marinos and loan to Matsumoto Yamaga ===
On 23 December 2019, Mae was announced at Yokohama F. Marinos.

On 5 August 2020, Mae was announced at Matsumoto Yamaga on loan.

=== Matsumoto Yamaga ===
On 25 December 2020, Mae was announced at Matsumoto Yamaga on a permanent deal. He made his league debut against Renofa Yamaguchi on 28 February 2021. Mae scored his first league goal against Blaublitz Akita on 9 August 2021, scoring in the 36th minute. On 28 August 2021, he injured the medial collateral ligament in his left knee during training and would be out for six weeks.

=== Second spell at Renofa Yamaguchi ===
On 11 August 2022, Mae was announced at his former club Renofa Yamaguchi. He made his league debut against Fagiano Okayama on 13 August 2022. Mae scored his first league goal against Zweigen Kanazawa on 14 September 2022, scoring in the 63rd minute. In 2023 and 2024, he served as vice captain with the team. On 30 May 2023, it was announced that Mae was injured with an injury to the external rotator group of the right hip joint and would be out for three weeks.

=== JEF United Chiba ===
On 24 December 2024, Mae was announce official transfer to J2 club, JEF United Chiba from 2025 season.

== International career ==
On 2 June 2014, Mae was called up to the U-21 Japan national team training camp.

== Personal life ==
His younger brother Hiroyuki is also a professional footballer, currently playing for J1 League club Machida Zelvia.

== Career statistics ==
=== Club ===
As of the start from 2025 season.

Club performance			League		Cup		League Cup		Total	
Season	Club	League	Apps	Goals	Apps	Goals	Apps	Goals	Apps	Goals
Japan			League		Emperor's Cup		J.League Cup		Total	
2011	Consadole Sapporo	J.League Div 2	1	0	1	0	—		2	0
2012	Consadole Sapporo	J.League Div 1	15	0	0	0	6	0	21	0
2013	Consadole Sapporo	J.League Div 2	2	0	1	0	—		3	0
2014	Consadole Sapporo	J.League Div 2	3	0	1	0	—		4	0
2014	Kataller Toyama	J.League Div 2	14	3	0	0	—		14	3
2015	Consadole Sapporo	J2 League	17	1	1	0	—		18	1
2016	Hokkaido Consadole Sapporo	J2 League	2	0	0	0	—		2	0
2017	Renofa Yamaguchi	J2 League	24	2	1	0	—		25	2
2018	Renofa Yamaguchi	J2 League	40	2	1	0	—		41	2
2019	Renofa Yamaguchi	J2 League	37	2	0	0	—		37	2
2020	Yokohama F. Marinos	J1 League	0	0	0	0	—		0	0
2020	Matsumoto Yamaga (loan)	J2 League	24	1	0	0	—		24	1
2021	Matsumoto Yamaga	J2 League	28	1	0	0	—		28	1
2022	Matsumoto Yamaga	J3 League	16	0	0	0	—		16	0
2022	Renofa Yamaguchi	J2 League	11	1	0	0	—		11	1
2023	Renofa Yamaguchi	J2 League	34	0	0	0	—		34	0
2024	Renofa Yamaguchi	J2 League	37	0	0	0	—		37	0
2025	JEF United Chiba	J2 League	0	0	0	0	0	0	0	0
Career total			268	13	6	0	6	0	280	13
