= Hiroyuki Mae =

Japanese footballer (born 1995)

Hiroyuki Mae 前 寛之
Personal information
- Full name: Hiroyuki Mae
- Date of birth: 1 August 1995 (age 31)
- Place of birth: Sapporo, Japan
- Height: 1.73 m (5 ft 8 in)
- Position: Midfielder

Team information
- Current team: Machida Zelvia
- Number: 16

Youth career
- –2013: Consadole Sapporo

Senior career*
Years	Team	Apps	(Gls)
2013–2018	Hokkaido Consadole Sapporo	37	(2)
2014	→ Khonkaen (loan)	10	(1)
2014–2015	→ J. League U-22 (loan)	4	(0)
2018	→ Mito HollyHock (loan)	30	(0)
2019	Mito HollyHock	69	(5)
2020–2024	Avispa Fukuoka	183	(5)
2025–	Machida Zelvia	50	(0)
- * Club domestic league appearances and goals as of 9 August 2026

Hiroyuki Mae (前 寛之, Mae Hiroyuki; born 1 August 1995 in Sapporo) is a Japanese footballer who play as a Midfielder and set to play for Machida Zelvia from 2025.

His older brother Takayuki is also a professional footballer currently playing for J2 League club, JEF United Chiba.

== Career ==
On 29 December 2017, Hiroyuki signed to Mito HollyHock on loan from 2018 season. Mae missed early games due to a broken bone, but after returning, he played in all games and played a key role in the team. After the season ended, Hiroyuki received offers from multiple clubs, but he remained in Mito in 2019 as a permanent transfer. In the same year, Hiroyuki further increased the number of games he participated in and showed success in both offense and defense, scoring five points, his highest number in his career.

On 27 December 2019, Shigetoshi Hasebe, who was the manager of Mito until the previous year, Hiroyuki was complete transfer to Avispa Fukuoka, where Hasebe was appointed as manager.

On 20 December 2024, Hiroyuki announce official transfer to J1 club, Machida Zelvia.

== Career statistics ==
=== Club ===
As of the start from 2025 season.

Club performance			League		Cup		League Cup		Continental		Total	
Season	Club	League	Apps	Goals	Apps	Goals	Apps	Goals	Apps	Goals	Apps	Goals
Japan			League		Emperor's Cup		J.League Cup		ACL Elite		Total	
2013	Consadole Sapporo	J.League Div 2	–		1	0	–		—		1	0
2014	Consadole Sapporo	J.League Div 2	0	0	–		–		—		0	0
2015	Consadole Sapporo	J2 League	15	2	3	1	–		—		18	3
2016	Hokkaido Consadole Sapporo	J2 League	18	0	2	0	–		—		20	0
2017	Hokkaido Consadole Sapporo	J1 League	4	0	1	0	7	0	—		12	0
2018	Mito HollyHock	J2 League	30	0	0	0	–		—		30	0
2019	Mito HollyHock	J2 League	39	5	0	0	–		—		39	5
2020	Avispa Fukuoka	J2 League	30	1	–				—		30	1
2021	Avispa Fukuoka	J1 League	38	2	2	0	3	0	—		43	2
2022	Avispa Fukuoka	J1 League	34	0	0	0	8	0	—		43	0
2023	Avispa Fukuoka	J1 League	34	2	5	0	6	1	—		45	3
2024	Avispa Fukuoka	J1 League	37	1	1	0	0	0	—		38	1
2025	Machida Zelvia	J1 League	0	0	0	0	0	0	0	0	0	0
Career total			277	12	14	1	24	1	0	0	315	14

== Honours ==
Avispa Fukuoka

- J.League Cup: 2023

Machida Zelvia

- Emperor's Cup: 2025

Individual

- J. League Cup MVP: 2023
