= Hitoshi Okino =

Japanese footballer and manager

Personal information
- Full name: Hitoshi Okino
- Date of birth: March 19, 1959
- Place of birth: Hiroshima, Japan
- Date of death: September 11, 2009 (aged 50)
- Place of death: Tokyo, Japan

Youth career
- 1977–1980: Meiji University

Senior career*
Years	Team	Apps	(Gls)
1981–1991	Hiroshima Fujita		

Managerial career
- 2006: Avispa Fukuoka
- * Club domestic league appearances and goals

Hitoshi Okino (沖野 等, Okino Hitoshi; March 19, 1959 – September 11, 2009) was a Japanese football player and manager.

== Playing career ==
Hitoshi Okino played for Hiroshima Fujita SC in Japanese Prefectural Leagues and Japanese Regional Leagues from 1981 to 1991.

== Coaching career ==
Since 2001, Hitoshi Okino became coach and staff for some J.League club; Shonan Bellmare (2001-2004), Kawasaki Frontale (2005), Avispa Fukuoka (2006-2007). In December 2006, when he was assistant coach for Avispa Fukuoka under manager; Ryoichi Kawakatsu, Kawakatsu resigned manager. So he managed club for Emperor's Cup as caretaker.

== Death ==
On September 10, 2009, when he was staff for Japan Football League club; FC Machida Zelvia, he collapsed during training and he died on September 11 (Myocardial infarction, aged 50).
