= 2003 J.League Cup final =

Urawa Reds	Kashima Antlers
4	0
- Date: November 3, 2003
- Venue: National Stadium, Tokyo

2003 J.League Cup final was the 11th final of the J.League Cup competition. The final was played at National Stadium in Tokyo on November 3, 2003. Urawa Reds won the championship.

== Match details ==
November 3, 2003

Urawa Reds	4–0	Kashima Antlers
Koji Yamase 13'; Emerson 48', 86'; Tatsuya Tanaka 56'	Report

National Stadium

Urawa Reds
GK	23	(Japan) Ryota Tsuzuki
DF	2	(Japan) Keisuke Tsuboi
DF	3	(Australia) Zelic
DF	29	(Russia) Nikiforov
MF	6	(Japan) Nobuhisa Yamada
MF	13	(Japan) Keita Suzuki
MF	19	(Japan) Hideki Uchidate
MF	14	(Japan) Tadaaki Hirakawa
MF	8	(Japan) Koji Yamase	(substituted off) 84'
FW	11	(Japan) Tatsuya Tanaka	(substituted off) 82'
FW	10	(Brazil) Emerson
Substitutes:
GK	1	(Japan) Norihiro Yamagishi
DF	12	(Japan) Takuya Mikami
MF	20	(Japan) Satoshi Horinouchi
MF	17	(Japan) Makoto Hasebe	(substituted on) 84'
FW	9	(Japan) Yuichiro Nagai	(substituted on) 82'
Manager:
(Netherlands) Hans Ooft

Kashima Antlers
GK	21	(Japan) Hitoshi Sogahata
DF	2	(Japan) Akira Narahashi
DF	20	(Japan) Tomohiko Ikeuchi	(substituted off) 59'
DF	3	(Japan) Yutaka Akita
DF	4	(Japan) Go Oiwa
DF	22	(Japan) Tatsuya Ishikawa	(substituted off) 59'
MF	6	(Japan) Yasuto Honda
MF	24	(Japan) Takeshi Aoki
MF	8	(Japan) Mitsuo Ogasawara
FW	9	(Brazil) Euller	(substituted off) 26'
FW	26	(Japan) Masaki Fukai
Substitutes:
GK	32	(Japan) Yohei Nishibe
DF	15	(Japan) Seiji Kaneko
DF	7	(Japan) Naoki Soma	(substituted on) 59'
MF	25	(Japan) Takuya Nozawa	(substituted on) 59'
FW	27	(Japan) Yuki Nakashima	(substituted on) 26'
Manager:
(Brazil) Toninho Cerezo

== See also ==
- 2003 J.League Cup
