= Okino coal mine =

Mine in Russia

Okino Coal Mine
- Location: Buryatia, Russia
- Products: Coking coal

The Okino Coal Mine is a coal mine located in southern Russia in Buryatia. The mine has coal reserves amounting to 126 million tonnes of coking coal, one of the largest coal reserves in Asia and the world. The mine has an annual production capacity of 3 million tonnes of coal.
