= Lukian (footballer) =

Brazilian footballer (born 1991)

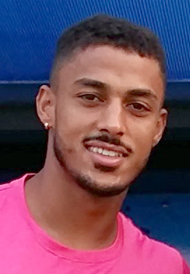

Personal information
- Full name: Lukian Araújo de Almeida
- Date of birth: 21 September 1991 (age 35)
- Place of birth: Rio de Janeiro, Brazil
- Height: 1.83 m (6 ft 0 in)
- Position: Forward

Team information
- Current team: Yokohama FC
- Number: 9

Senior career*
Years	Team	Apps	(Gls)
2011–2013	Nova Iguaçu	25	(3)
2013	Rio Branco	7	(2)
2013	Nova Iguaçu	4	(0)
2014	Rio Branco	14	(0)
2014	Santa Cruz	8	(2)
2015	Luverdense	5	(2)
2015–2016	Bucheon FC	60	(19)
2017	Busan IPark	18	(2)
2017	→ FC Anyang (loan)	10	(4)
2018	Pattaya United	32	(18)
2019	Chonburi	14	(11)
2019–2021	Júbilo Iwata	85	(33)
2022–2023	Avispa Fukuoka	32	(3)
2024–2025	Shonan Bellmare	36	(12)
2025–	Yokohama FC	50	(6)
- * Club domestic league appearances and goals as of 13 August 2026

Lukian Araújo de Almeida or simply Lukian (born 21 September 1991) is a Brazilian professional footballer who plays as a forward for Yokohama FC.

== Career ==
Lukian joined K League Challenge side Bucheon FC in July 2015.

He was announced at Júbilo Iwata on 23 July 2019.

On 9 January 2024, he was announced at Shonan Bellmare.

On 26 March 2025, Lukian was announced at Yokohama FC.

== Career statistics ==
As of 2 December 2023

Appearances and goals by club, season and competition
Club	Season	League			State League		National cup		League cup		Continental		Other		Total	
Club	Season	Division	Apps	Goals	Apps	Goals	Apps	Goals	Apps	Goals	Apps	Goals	Apps	Goals	Apps	Goals
Bucheon FC	2015	K League Challenge	22	4	—		0	0	—		—		—		22	4
Bucheon FC	2016	K League Challenge	38	15	—		3	0	—		—		1	0	42	15
Bucheon FC	Total		60	19	0	0	3	0	0	0	0	0	1	0	64	19
Busan IPark	2017	K League Challenge	18	2	—		3	0	—		—		—		21	2
FC Anyang (loan)	2017	K League Challenge	10	4	—		0	0	—		—		—		10	4
Pattaya United	2018	Thai League 1	32	18	—		1	0	1	1	—		—		34	19
Chonburi	2019	Thai League 1	14	11	—		1	0	1	0	—		—		16	11
Júbilo Iwata	2019	J1 League	13	1	—		1	0	0	0	—		—		14	0
Júbilo Iwata	2020	J2 League	31	10	—		—		—		—		—		31	10
Júbilo Iwata	2021	J2 League	41	22	—		1	0	—		—		—		42	22
Júbilo Iwata	Total		85	33	0	0	2	0	0	0	0	0	0	0	87	33
Avispa Fukuoka	2022	J1 League	34	3	—		3	0	9	3	—		—		46	6
Avispa Fukuoka	2023	J1 League	27	5	—		3	1	6	1	—		—		36	7
Avispa Fukuoka	Total		61	8	0	0	6	1	15	4	0	0	0	0	82	13
Shonan Bellmare	2024	J1 League	36	12	—											
Career total			280	85	0	0	16	1	17	5	0	0	1	0	314	91
