= Shun Nakamura (footballer) =

Japanese footballer (born 1994)

Shun Nakamura 中村 駿
Personal information
- Full name: Shun Nakamura
- Date of birth: February 24, 1994 (age 32)
- Place of birth: Chiba, Japan
- Height: 1.78 m (5 ft 10 in)
- Position: Midfielder

Team information
- Current team: FC Gifu
- Number: 9

Youth career
- FC Miyama East
- –2008: Wings SS Narashino
- 2009–2011: Narashino High School

College career
Years	Team	Apps	(Gls)
2012–2015	Komazawa University		

Senior career*
Years	Team	Apps	(Gls)
2016	Thespakusatsu Gunma	34	(4)
2017–2020	Montedio Yamagata	141	(17)
2021	Shonan Bellmare	11	(0)
2021–2023	Avispa Fukuoka	52	(1)
2024–2025	Júbilo Iwata	38	(1)
2024–	FC Gifu	19	(1)
- * Club domestic league appearances and goals as of 17 August 2026

Shun Nakamura (中村 駿, Nakamura Shun; born February 24, 1994) is a Japanese footballer who plays as a midfielder for FC Gifu.

== Career ==
Shun Nakamura joined J2 League club Thespakusatsu Gunma in 2016. After one season, he stayed in the J2 League and joined Montedio Yamagata where he played 147 games over 4 seasons for the club. After a brief spell at J1 League club Shonan Bellmare in 2021, in July of the same year it was announced Nakamura would be joining Avispa Fukuoka.

== Club statistics ==
As of 27 May 2024.

Appearances and goals by club, season and competition
Club	Season	League			Emperor's Cup		J.League Cup		Other		Total	
Club	Season	Division	Apps	Goals	Apps	Goals	Apps	Goals	Apps	Goals	Apps	Goals
Thespakusatsu Gunma	2016	J2 League	34	4	2	0	–		–		36	4
Montedio Yamagata	2017	J2 League	25	4	1	0	–		–		26	4
Montedio Yamagata	2018	J2 League	38	2	5	0	–		–		43	2
Montedio Yamagata	2019	J2 League	38	6	–		–		2 (Note: J1/J2 play-offs)	0	40	6
Montedio Yamagata	2020	J2 League	38	5	–		–		–		38	5
Montedio Yamagata	Total		139	17	6	0	0	0	2	0	147	17
Shonan Bellmare	2021	J1 League	11	0	–		1	1	–		12	1
Avispa Fukuoka	2021	J1 League	13	0	–		–		–		13	0
Avispa Fukuoka	2022	J1 League	26	1	0	0	5	0	0	0	31	1
Avispa Fukuoka	2023	J1 League	13	0	0	0	6	0	0	0	19	0
Avispa Fukuoka	Total		52	1	0	0	11	0	0	0	63	1
Júbilo Iwata	2024	J1 League	4	0	0	0	0	0	0	0	4	0
Career Total			240	22	8	0	12	1	2	0	262	23
