= Yuji Kitajima =

Japanese professional footballer

Yuji Kitajima 北島 祐二
Personal information
- Date of birth: 4 August 2000 (age 26)
- Place of birth: Fukuoka, Japan
- Height: 1.69 m (5 ft 7 in)
- Position: Midfielder

Team information
- Current team: Avispa Fukuoka
- Number: 25

Youth career
- 2007–2012: Azumano SC
- 2013–2018: Avispa Fukuoka

Senior career*
Years	Team	Apps	(Gls)
2019–	Avispa Fukuoka	75	(1)
2023	→ Tokyo Verdy (loan)	28	(3)
- * Club domestic league appearances and goals as of 12 August 2026

Yuji Kitajima (北島 祐二, Kitajima Yūji; born 4 August 2000) is a Japanese professional footballer who plays as a midfielder for J1 League club Avispa Fukuoka.

== Career statistics ==
As of 24 June 2023

Appearances and goals by club, season and competition
Club	Season	League			National Cup		League Cup		Total	
Club	Season	Division	Apps	Goals	Apps	Goals	Apps	Goals	Apps	Goals
Japan			League		Emperor's Cup		J. League Cup		Total	
Avispa Fukuoka	2018	J2 League	0	0	0	0	–		0	0
Avispa Fukuoka	2019	J2 League	5	0	1	0	–		6	0
Avispa Fukuoka	2020	J2 League	8	0	0	0	–		8	0
Avispa Fukuoka	2021	J1 League	4	0	0	0	6	0	10	0
Avispa Fukuoka	2022	J1 League	9	0	4	2	6	0	19	2
Avispa Fukuoka	Total		26	0	5	2	12	0	43	2
Tokyo Verdy (loan)	2023	J2 League	17	2	0	0	–		17	2
Career total			43	2	5	2	12	0	60	4
