= 2016 J.League Cup final =

Urawa Red Diamonds	Gamba Osaka
1	1
- Urawa Red Diamonds won 5–4 on penalties
- Date: October 15, 2016
- Venue: Saitama Stadium 2002, Saitama

2016 J.League Cup final was the 24th final of the J.League Cup competition. The final was played at Saitama Stadium 2002 in Saitama on October 15, 2016. Urawa Reds won the championship.

== Match details ==
October 15, 2016

Urawa Reds	1–1	Gamba Osaka
Tadanari Lee 76'	Report	Ademilson 17'
Penalties
	5–4

Saitama Stadium 2002

Urawa Reds
GK	1	(Japan) Shusaku Nishikawa
DF	46	(Japan) Ryota Moriwaki
DF	6	(Japan) Wataru Endo
DF	5	(Japan) Tomoaki Makino
MF	24	(Japan) Takahiro Sekine
MF	10	(Japan) Yosuke Kashiwagi
MF	22	(Japan) Yuki Abe
MF	3	(Japan) Tomoya Ugajin	(substituted off) 36'
MF	9	(Japan) Yuki Muto	(substituted off) 70'
MF	13	(Japan) Toshiyuki Takagi	(substituted off) 76'
FW	30	(Japan) Shinzo Koroki
Substitutes:
GK	15	(Japan) Koki Otani
DF	4	(Japan) Daisuke Nasu
MF	16	(Japan) Takuya Aoki
MF	18	(Japan) Yoshiaki Komai	(substituted on) 36'
FW	11	(Japan) Naoki Ishihara
FW	20	(Japan) Tadanari Lee	(substituted on) 76'
FW	21	(Slovenia) Zlatan	(substituted on) 70'
Manager:
(Serbia) Petrovic

Gamba Osaka
GK	1	(Japan) Masaaki Higashiguchi
DF	14	(Japan) Koki Yonekura
DF	5	(Japan) Daiki Niwa
DF	6	(South Korea) Kim Jung-ya
DF	4	(Japan) Hiroki Fujiharu
MF	21	(Japan) Yosuke Ideguchi
MF	15	(Japan) Yasuyuki Konno
MF	11	(Japan) Shu Kurata	(substituted off) 88'
MF	19	(Japan) Kotaro Omori	(substituted off) 72'
FW	7	(Japan) Yasuhito Endo
FW	9	(Brazil) Ademilson	(substituted off) 66'
Substitutes:
GK	18	(Japan) Yosuke Fujigaya
DF	8	(Japan) Keisuke Iwashita
DF	22	(South Korea) Oh Jae-suk
MF	25	(Japan) Jungo Fujimoto	(substituted on) 72'
MF	27	(Japan) Tatsuya Uchida
FW	20	(Japan) Shun Nagasawa	(substituted on) 66'
FW	23	(Japan) Hiroto Goya	(substituted on) 88'
Manager:
(Japan) Kenta Hasegawa

== See also ==
- 2016 J.League Cup
