= Itsuki Oda =

Japanese footballer

Itsuki Oda 小田 逸稀
Personal information
- Full name: Itsuki Oda
- Date of birth: 16 July 1998 (age 28)
- Place of birth: Saga, Japan
- Height: 1.73 m (5 ft 8 in)
- Position: Full back

Team information
- Current team: Oita Trinita
- Number: 2

Youth career
- Sagan Tosu
- 2014–2016: Higashi Fukuoka High School

Senior career*
Years	Team	Apps	(Gls)
2017–2022	Kashima Antlers	10	(1)
2020	→ Machida Zelvia (loan)	38	(3)
2021	→ JEF United Chiba (loan)	24	(2)
2023–2025	Avispa Fukuoka	63	(4)
2026	Matsumoto Yamaga	19	(4)
2026–	Oita Trinita	0	(0)
Medal record
Kashima Antlers
Winner	AFC Champions League	2018
Runner-up	J1 League	2017
Avispa Fukuoka
Winner	J.League Cup	2023
- * Club domestic league appearances and goals as of 17:15, 7 August 2026 (UTC)

Itsuki Oda (小田 逸稀, Oda Itsuki; born July 16, 1998) is a Japanese professional footballer who plays as a full back for J2 League club Oita Trinita.

== Career ==
Itsuki Oda joined J1 League club Kashima Antlers in 2017. On July 12, he debuted in Emperor's Cup (v Montedio Yamagata).

Oda was twice loaned out to J2 league clubs, firstly Machida Zelvia in the 2020 season and secondly to JEF United Chiba in the 2021 season. He returned to Kashima for the 2022 season but only played a handful of games.

On 26 January 2023, it was announced that Oda would be joining Avispa Fukuoka.

== Career statistics ==
=== Club ===
As of 7 August 2026.

Appearances and goals by club, season and competition
Club	Season	League			National cup (Note: Includes Emperors Cup)		League cup (Note: Includes J.League Cup)		Continental		Total	
Club	Season	Division	Apps	Goals	Apps	Goals	Apps	Goals	Apps	Goals	Apps	Goals
Kashima Antlers	2017		0	0	2	0	0	0	0	0	2	0
Kashima Antlers	2018	J1 League	6	1	0	0	0	0	1 (Note: Appearances in AFC Champions League Elite)	0	7	1
Kashima Antlers	2019	J1 League	2	0	3	1	0	0	3	0	8	1
Kashima Antlers	2022	J1 League	2	0	1	0	3	0	0	0	6	0
Kashima Antlers	Total		10	1	6	1	3	0	4	0	23	2
Machida Zelvia (loan)	2020	J2 League	38	3	–		–		–		38	3
JEF United Chiba (loan)	2021	J2 League	24	2	–		–		–		24	2
Avispa Fukuoka	2023	J1 League	30	2	4	0	7	2	–		41	4
Avispa Fukuoka	2024	J1 League	28	2	1	0	1	0	–		30	2
Avispa Fukuoka	2025	J1 League	5	0	0	0	0	0	–		5	0
Avispa Fukuoka	Total		63	4	5	0	8	2	0	0	76	6
Matsumoto Yamaga	2026	J2/J3 (100)	19	4	–		–		–		19	4
Career total			154	14	11	1	11	2	4	0	180	17

== Honours ==
=== Club ===
Kashima Antlers

- AFC Champions League: 2018

Avispa Fukuoka

- J.League Cup: 2023
