= Yuya Yamagishi =

Japanese footballer

Yuya Yamagishi 山岸 祐也
Personal information
- Full name: Yuya Yamagishi
- Date of birth: August 29, 1993 (age 33)
- Place of birth: Chiba, Japan
- Height: 1.83 m (6 ft 0 in)
- Positions: Winger; attacking midfielder; forward

Team information
- Current team: Nagoya Grampus
- Number: 11

Youth career
- Kashiwa Russell
- 2009–2011: Shoshi High School

College career
Years	Team	Apps	(Gls)
2012–2015	Ryutsu Keizai University		

Senior career*
Years	Team	Apps	(Gls)
2016–2017	Thespakusatsu Gunma	69	(8)
2017–2018	FC Gifu	53	(8)
2018–2020	Montedio Yamagata	39	(11)
2020–2023	Avispa Fukuoka	114	(28)
2024–	Nagoya Grampus	71	(15)
- * Club domestic league appearances and goals as of 12 August 2026

Yuya Yamagishi (山岸 祐也, Yamagishi Yūya; born August 29, 1993) is a Japanese football player who plays for Nagoya Grampus.

== Career ==
On 27 December 2017, Yamagishi was announced at FC Gifu.

On 6 October 2020, Yamagishi was announced at Avispa Fukuoka on a permanent transfer.

On 29 December 2023, Yamagishi was announced at Nagoya Grampus.

== Career statistics ==
Updated to 11 April 2024.

Appearances and goals by club, season and competition
Club	Season	League			Emperor's Cup		J.League Cup		Total	
Club	Season	Division	Apps	Goals	Apps	Goals	Apps	Goals	Apps	Goals
Ryutsu Keizai University	2015	–	–		2	0	–		2	0
Thespakusatsu Gunma	2016	J2 League	33	5	1	0	–		34	5
Thespakusatsu Gunma	2017	J2 League	36	3	2	1	–		36	3
FC Gifu	2018	J2 League	31	4	1	1	–		32	4
FC Gifu	2019	J2 League	22	4	0	0	–		22	4
Montedio Yamagata	2019	J2 League	14	4	0	0	–		14	4
Montedio Yamagata	2020	J2 League	23	6	–		–		23	6
Avispa Fukuoka	2020	J2 League	17	3	–		–		17	3
Avispa Fukuoka	2021	J1 League	29	5	1	3	3	0	33	8
Avispa Fukuoka	2022	J1 League	34	10	0	0	5	2	39	12
Avispa Fukuoka	2023	J1 League	34	10	5	3	8	2	47	15
Nagoya Grampus	2024	J1 League	4	0	0	0	0	0	4	0
Career total			279	55	12	8	16	4	305	66

== Honours ==
Nagoya Grampus

- J.League Cup: 2024

Individual

- J1 100 Year Vision League Regional Round West Best Eleven: 2026
