= Masato Shigemi =

Japanese footballer (born 2001)

Masato Shigemi 重見 柾斗
Personal information
- Full name: Masato Shigemi
- Date of birth: September 20, 2001 (age 25)
- Place of birth: Oita, Japan
- Height: 1.71 m (5 ft 7 1/2 in)
- Position: Midfielder

Team information
- Current team: Avispa Fukuoka
- Number: 6

Youth career
- Tajiri SSS
- Oita Junior High School
- 2017–2019: Oita High School

College career
Years	Team	Apps	(Gls)
2020–2023	Fukuoka University		

Senior career*
Years	Team	Apps	(Gls)
2023–	Avispa Fukuoka	84	(3)

International career^{‡}
2023–	Japan U23	7	(0)
Medal record
Men's football
Representing Japan
Asian Games
Silver medal – second place	2022 Hangzhou	Team
- * Club domestic league appearances and goals as of 12 August 2026 ‡ National team caps and goals as of 07:11, 14 April 2024 (UTC)

Masato Shigemi (重見 柾斗, Shigemi Masato; born September 20, 2001) is a Japanese professional footballer who plays for J1 League club Avispa Fukuoka.

== Youth career ==
Born in the Ōita Prefecture, Shigemi started playing football at his local high school in Ōita, specifically at Ōita High School, and featured in the All Japan High School Soccer Tournament during his second and third years.

Following his performances, he reportedly caught the attention of several J.League clubs, but eventually decided to commit to Fukuoka University.

== Club career ==
On March 24, 2023, J1 League club Avispa Fukuoka officially announced that Shigemi had signed a development contract with the club, while receiving an offer to join the club permanently for the 2024 season. He was subsequently registered as a designated special player within the team's roster.

He made his professional debut for Avispa in a J.League Cup match against Kashima Antlers on April 5, 2023. The club eventually won the trophy at the end of the season.

On June 30, 2024, he made his first professional goal against FC Tokyo.

== International career ==
In September 2023, Shigemi was included by head coach Go Oiwa in the Japan under-23 squad for the 2022 Asian Games, where the Samurai Blue eventually won the silver medal after losing to South Korea in the final.

== Career statistics ==
As of 15 May 2024

Appearances and goals by club, season and competition
Club	Season	League			Emperor's Cup		J. League Cup		Total	
Club	Season	Division	Apps	Goals	Apps	Goals	Apps	Goals	Apps	Goals
Avispa Fukuoka	2023	J1 League	5	0	0	0	2	0	7	0
Avispa Fukuoka	2024	J1 League	16	0	1	0	2	0	19	0
Total			21	0	1	0	4	0	26	0

== Honors ==
=== Club ===
==== Avispa Fukuoka ====
- J.League Cup: 2023

=== International ===
==== Japan U23 ====
- Asian Games runners-up: 2023
