= Seiya Inoue (footballer) =

Japanese footballer

Seiya Inoue 井上 聖也
Personal information
- Date of birth: 9 November 1999 (age 26)
- Place of birth: Hyōgo, Japan
- Height: 1.87 m (6 ft 2 in)
- Position: Defender

Team information
- Current team: Oita Trinita (on loan from Avispa Fukuoka)
- Number: 33

Youth career
- Suehiro FC
- Hobai Junior High School
- 2015–2017: Nishinomiya High School

College career
Years	Team	Apps	(Gls)
2018–2021	Konan University		

Senior career*
Years	Team	Apps	(Gls)
2022–	Avispa Fukuoka	31	(0)
2025	→ Tokushima Vortis (loan)	7	(0)
2026	→ Mito HollyHock (loan)	1	(0)
2026–	→ Oita Trinita (loan)	0	(0)
- * Club domestic league appearances and goals as of 23:02, 28 February 2026 (UTC)

Seiya Inoue (井上 聖也, Inoue Seiya; born 9 November 1999) is a Japanese professional footballer who plays as a centre back for J2 League club Oita Trinita, on loan from Avispa Fukuoka.

== Career ==
During his time at Konan University, he contributed to the team's best ever result of third place in the Kansai Student Soccer League. From the end of January to early February 2021, Inoue was called up to Avispa Fukuoka's training camp. On 12 March 2021, he was announced at Avispa for the 2022 season as a designated special player. On 26 November 2022, Inoue's contract with the club was extended for the 2023 season. He made his league debut against Vissel Kobe on 25 June 2023. On 26 December 2023, Inoue's contract with the club was extended for the 2024 season. He scored his first goal for the club in the J.League Cup against Matsumoto Yamaga on 17 April 2024, scoring in the 73rd minute. On 19 December 2024, Inoue's contract with the club was extended for the 2025 season.

On 29 June 2026, Inoue joined J2 League club Oita Trinita in a third successive loan spell away from Avispa Fukuoka.

== Career statistics ==
=== Club ===
As of 28 February 2026.

Appearances and goals by club, season and competition
Club	Season	League			Emperor's Cup		J.League Cup		Other		Total	
Club	Season	Division	Apps	Goals	Apps	Goals	Apps	Goals	Apps	Goals	Apps	Goals
Avispa Fukuoka	2022	J1 League	0	0	3	0	5	0	—		8	0
Avispa Fukuoka	2023	J1 League	6	0	4	0	6	0	—		16	0
Avispa Fukuoka	2024	J1 League	25	0	2	0	2	2	—		29	2
Avispa Fukuoka	2025	J1 League	0	0	1	0	1	0	—		2	0
Avispa Fukuoka	Total		31	0	10	0	14	2	1	0	55	2
Tokushima Vortis (loan)	2025	J2 League	7	0	0	0	0	0	1 (Note: Appearance in J1/J2 play-offs)	0	8	0
Mito HollyHock (loan)	2026	J1 (100)	1	0	—		—		—		1	0
Oita Trinita (loan)	2026–27	J2 League	0	0	0	0	0	0	0	0	0	0
Career total			39	0	10	0	14	2	1	0	64	2
