= Wellington (footballer, born 1988) =

Brazilian footballer, (born 1988)

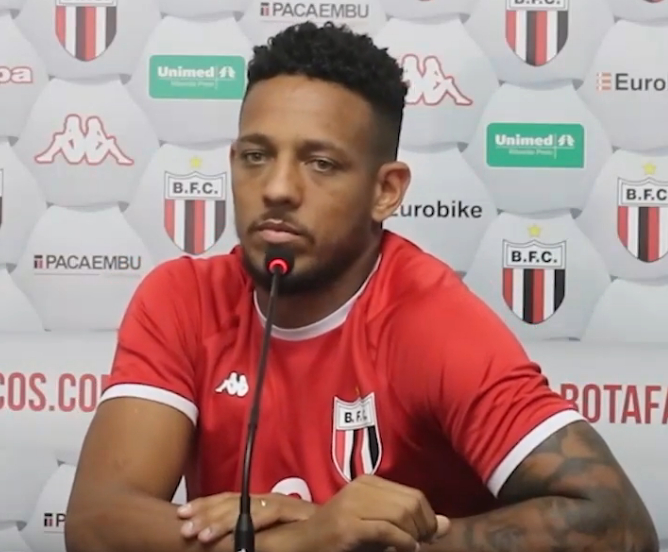
- Wellington with Botafogo at press conference in 2020

Personal information
- Full name: Wellington Luís de Sousa
- Date of birth: 11 February 1988 (age 38)
- Place of birth: Ourinhos, São Paulo, Brazil
- Height: 1.86 m (6 ft 1 in)
- Position: Striker

Team information
- Current team: Matsumoto Yamaga FC
- Number: 9

Youth career
- –2007: Internacional

Senior career*
Years	Team	Apps	(Gls)
2007–2008	Internacional	9	(1)
2007	→ São Caetano (loan)	0	(0)
2008	→ Náutico (loan)	14	(5)
2008–2012	1899 Hoffenheim	19	(3)
2009–2010	→ Twente (loan)	3	(0)
2010	→ Fortuna Düsseldorf (loan)	6	(1)
2011	→ Figueirense (loan)	23	(8)
2011	→ Goiás (loan)	8	(1)
2012	→ Linense (loan)	10	(1)
2013	Pelotas	12	(2)
2013–2014	Shonan Bellmare	54	(23)
2015	Ponte Preta	9	(2)
2015–2017	Avispa Fukuoka	83	(31)
2018–2020	Vissel Kobe	43	(11)
2020	Botafogo-SP	32	(8)
2021–2022	Shonan Bellmare	53	(8)
2023–2025	Avispa Fukuoka	90	(8)
2026	América-RN	23	(3)
2026–	Matsumoto Yamaga FC		
- * Club domestic league appearances and goals as of 22:05, 5 August 2026 (UTC)

Wellington Luís de Sousa (born 11 February 1988), commonly known as Wellington, is a Brazilian professional footballer who plays as a striker for Brazilian club América-RN.

== Career ==
Wellington started his professional career in 2007 with Sport Club Internacional. In the same year, he was lent to São Caetano.

He played for Náutico in 2008 also on loan, before Wellington left Internacional for TSG 1899 Hoffenheim on 7 August 2008. He played only 18 games and was loaned out to FC Twente on 31 August 2009.

On 6 July 2010, he was loaned out to Fortuna Düsseldorf in the 2. Bundesliga. He made his debut in the DFB-Pokal match against TuS Koblenz on 15 August 2010 and scored his first goal – a wide distance shot from 35 meters – as a substitute during a 1–2 defeat against Hertha BSC Berlin on 30 August.

In the winter break, he returned to Brazil, transferring to Figueirense on loan.

On 2 August 2012, his contract until June 2013 at 1899 Hoffenheim was terminated in mutual consent. After playing for EC Pelotas in the first half of 2013, he was acquired by Shonan Bellmare.

On 26 December 2017, Wellington was announced at Vissel Kobe.

On 21 December 2020, Wellington was announced at Shonan Bellmare.

On 1 March 2023, Wellington was announced at Avispa Fukuoka.

== Career statistics ==
As of 5 August 2026

Appearances and goals by club, season and competition
Club	Season	League			State League (Note: Includes Campeonato Gaúcho, Campeonato Paulista, Campeonato Catarinense and Campeonato Potiguar)		National cup (Note: Includes DFB-Pokal, KNVB Cup, Emperors Cup and Copa do Brasil)		League cup (Note: Includes J.League Cup)		Other		Total	
Club	Season	Division	Apps	Goals	Apps	Goals	Apps	Goals	Apps	Goals	Apps	Goals	Apps	Goals
Internacional	2007	Série A	7	0	2	1	0	0	0	0	–		9	1
São Caetano (loan)	2007	Série B	0	0	0	0	0	0	0	0	–		0	0
Náutico (loan)	2008	Série A	14	5	0	0	4	2	0	0	–		18	7
1899 Hoffenheim	2008–09	Bundesliga	18	3	–		0	0	0	0	–		18	3
1899 Hoffenheim	2009–10	Bundesliga	1	0	–		1	0	0	0	–		2	0
1899 Hoffenheim	Total		19	3	0	0	1	0	0	0	0	0	20	3
FC Twente (loan)	2009–10	Eredivisie	3	0	–		2	2	0	0	–		5	2
Fortuna Düsseldorf (loan)	2010–11	2. Bundesliga	6	1	–		1	0	0	0	–		7	1
Figueirense (loan)	2011	Série A	4	1	19	7	0	0	0	0	–		23	8
Goiás (loan)	2011	Série B	8	1	0	0	0	0	0	0	–		8	1
Linense (loan)	2012	Paulista	–		10	1	0	0	0	0	–		10	1
Pelotas	2013	Gaúcho	–		12	2	0	0	0	0	–		12	2
Shonan Bellmare	2013	J.League Division 1	16	3	–		1	0	0	0	–		17	3
Shonan Bellmare	2014	J.League Division 2	38	20	–		2	0	0	0	–		40	20
Shonan Bellmare	Total		54	23	0	0	3	0	0	0	0	0	57	23
Ponte Preta	2015	Série A	0	0	9	2	1	0	–		–		10	2
Avispa Fukuoka	2015	J2 League	18	7	–		2	0	0	0	2 (Note: Appearance in J1/J2 play-offs)	1	22	8
Avispa Fukuoka	2016	J1 League	29	5	–		0	0	2	1	0	0	31	6
Avispa Fukuoka	2017	J2 League	36	19	–		0	0	0	0	2	0	38	19
Avispa Fukuoka	Total		83	31	0	0	2	0	2	1	4	1	91	33
Vissel Kobe	2018	J1 League	27	5	–		3	3	6	3	–		36	11
Vissel Kobe	2019	J1 League	15	6	–		1	0	6	4	–		22	10
Vissel Kobe	Total		42	11	0	0	4	3	12	7	0	0	58	21
Botafogo-SP	2020	Série B	23	5	9	3	–		–		–		32	8
Shonan Bellmare	2021	J1 League	26	6	–		2	0	5	1	–		33	7
Shonan Bellmare	2022	J1 League	27	2	–		2	0	6	0	–		35	2
Shonan Bellmare	Total		53	8	0	0	4	0	11	1	0	0	68	9
Avispa Fukuoka	2023	J1 League	27	3	–		5	2	10	3	0	0	42	8
Avispa Fukuoka	2024	J1 League	33	3	–		1	1	2	0	0	0	36	4
Avispa Fukuoka	2025	J1 League	30	2	–		3	0	4	2	0	0	37	4
Avispa Fukuoka	Total		90	8	0	0	9	3	16	5	0	0	115	16
América-RN	2026	Série D	15	1	8	2	2	0	–		5 (Note: Appearance(s) in Copa do Nordeste)	0	30	3
Career total			421	98	69	18	33	10	41	14	9	1	573	141

== Honours ==
FC Twente

- Eredivisie: 2009–10

Shonan Bellmare

- J2 League: 2014

Vissel Kobe

- Emperor's Cup: 2019

Avispa Fukuoka

- J.League Cup: 2023
