= Douglas Grolli =

Brazilian footballer (born 1989)

Personal information
- Full name: Douglas Ricardo Grolli
- Date of birth: 5 October 1989 (age 37)
- Place of birth: São Miguel do Oeste, Brazil
- Height: 1.89 m (6 ft 2 in)
- Position: Centre-back

Youth career
- 2006–2008: Chapecoense

Senior career*
Years	Team	Apps	(Gls)
2008–2011	Chapecoense	23	(1)
2012–2015	Grêmio	12	(2)
2013	→ São Caetano (loan)	25	(2)
2014	→ Londrina (loan)	8	(2)
2014–2015	→ Chapecoense (loan)	22	(2)
2015–2018	Cruzeiro	2	(0)
2016	→ Ponte Preta (loan)	30	(3)
2017	→ Chapecoense (loan)	36	(2)
2018	Bahia	18	(1)
2019	Marítimo	19	(0)
2020–2024	Avispa Fukuoka	136	(5)
2025–2026	Portimonense S.C.	23	(1)
- * Club domestic league appearances and goals

Douglas Ricardo Grolli (born 5 October 1989), known as Douglas Grolli, is a Brazilian former professional footballer who played as a centre-back. He spent his career in Brazil, Japan and Portugal.

== Career ==
Grolli was born in São Miguel do Oeste, Santa Catarina, and was a Chapecoense youth graduate. Promoted to the first team in 2008, he only became a regular starter during the 2011 season, as his side was crowned champions of Campeonato Catarinense.

On 14 October 2011, Grolli signed for Série A club Grêmio. A fourth choice behind Werley, Vilson and Naldo, he made his debut in the category on 17 June 2012, coming on as a first-half substitute for the former in a 0–1 away loss against Náutico; he was also sent off during the match.

On 13 May 2013, Grolli was loaned to São Caetano until the end of the year. On 27 December, he moved to Londrina also in a temporary deal, but after appearing sparingly, he returned to Chapecoense the following 30 July, on loan until December.

On 9 February 2015, Grolli signed a permanent deal with Cruzeiro. Again rarely used, he served subsequent loans at Ponte Preta and Chapecoense.

On 4 January 2019, Grolli signed a contract with Marítimo.

After five seasons with Japanese club Avispa Fukuoka, Douglas Grolli moved to Liga Portugal 2 club Portimonense S.C. after his contract expired at the end of the 2024 Japanese league season. On 10 January 2026, after spending one-and-a-half seasons with the Portimão-based side, he terminated his contract and retired.

== Career statistics ==
As of 10 February 2024

Appearances and goals by club, season and competition
Club	Season	League			State league		National cup		League cup		Continental		Other		Total	
Club	Season	Division	Apps	Goals	Apps	Goals	Apps	Goals	Apps	Goals	Apps	Goals	Apps	Goals	Apps	Goals
Chapecoense	2010	Série C	0	0	—		—		—		—		—		0	0
Chapecoense	2011	Série C	9	1	14	0	—		—		—		—		23	1
Chapecoense	Total		9	1	14	0	0	0	0	0	0	0	0	0	23	1
Grêmio	2012	Série A	1	0	8	2	0	0	—		—		—		9	2
Grêmio	2013	Série A	0	0	3	0	0	0	—		0	0	—		3	0
Grêmio	2014	Série A	0	0	0	0	0	0	—		—		—		0	0
Grêmio	Total		1	0	11	2	0	0	0	0	0	0	0	0	12	2
São Caetano (loan)	2013	Série B	25	2	—		—		—		—		—		25	2
Londrina (loan)	2014	Série D	0	0	8	2	1	0	—		—		—		9	2
Chapecoense (loan)	2014	Série A	19	2	—		—		—		—		—		19	2
Chapecoense (loan)	2015	Série A	0	0	3	0	0	0	—		—		—		3	0
Chapecoense (loan)	Total		19	2	3	0	0	0	0	0	0	0	0	0	22	2
Cruzeiro	2015	Série A	2	0	0	0	0	0	—		0	0	—		2	0
Ponte Preta (loan)	2016	Série A	23	1	7	2	7	3	—		—		—		37	6
Chapecoense (loan)	2017	Série A	20	1	16	1	0	0	—		2	0	1	0	39	2
Bahia	2018	Série A	12	1	6	0	0	0	—		6	1	3	0	27	2
Marítimo	2018–19	Primeira Liga	13	0	—		0	0	0	0	—		—		13	0
Marítimo	2019–20	Primeira Liga	6	0	—		1	0	2	0	—		—		9	0
Marítimo	Total		19	0	0	0	1	0	2	0	0	0	0	0	22	0
Avispa Fukuoka	2020	J2 League	28	2	—		—		—		—		—		28	2
Avispa Fukuoka	2021	J1 League	30	1	—		1	0	2	0	—		—		33	1
Avispa Fukuoka	2022	J1 League	26	0	—		2	0	7	0	—		—		35	0
Avispa Fukuoka	2023	J1 League	29	2	—		4	1	7	0	—		—		40	3
Avispa Fukuoka	2024	J1 League	23	0	—		1	0	1	0	—		—		25	0
Avispa Fukuoka	Total		136	5	0	0	8	1	17	0	0	0	0	0	161	6
Portimonense S.C.	2024–25	Liga Portugal 2	1	0	—		0	0	0	0	—		—		1	0
Career total			267	13	65	7	17	4	19	0	8	1	4	0	380	25

== Honours ==
Chapecoense

- Campeonato Catarinense: 2011, 2017

Londrina

- Campeonato Paranaense: 2014

Avispa Fukuoka

- J.League Cup: 2023
