= Kazuya Konno =

Japanese footballer

Kazuya Konno 紺野 和也
Personal information
- Date of birth: 11 July 1997 (age 29)
- Place of birth: Yoshikawa, Saitama, Japan
- Height: 1.61 m (5 ft 3 in)
- Position: Winger

Team information
- Current team: Kawasaki Frontale
- Number: 18

Youth career
- 2004–2008: Kashiwanoha FC
- 2008–2009: Yoshikawa White Shark
- 2010–2012: CA Alegre
- 2013–2015: Bunan High School

College career
Years	Team	Apps	(Gls)
2016–2019	Hosei University		

Senior career*
Years	Team	Apps	(Gls)
2019–2022	FC Tokyo	42	(3)
2019	→ FC Tokyo U-23 (loan)	4	(0)
2023–2025	Avispa Fukuoka	102	(14)
2026–	Kawasaki Frontale	9	(0)
- * Club domestic league appearances and goals as of 1 August 2026

Kazuya Konno (紺野 和也, Konno Kazuya; born 11 July 1997) is a Japanese footballer who plays as a winger and second striker for J1 League club Kawasaki Frontale.

== Career ==
On 29 February 2019, it was announced that Konno would join FC Tokyo's first team from the 2020 season. Nearly a month later, it was announced that he had been registered as a specially designated player.

On 28 November 2022, Konno was announced at Avispa Fukuoka.

== Career statistics ==
=== Club ===
As of 13 April 2026.

Appearances and goals by club, season and competition
Club	Season	League			National cup (Note: Includes Emperors Cup)		League cup (Note: Includes J.League Cup)		Continental		Total	
Club	Season	Division	Apps	Goals	Apps	Goals	Apps	Goals	Apps	Goals	Apps	Goals
FC Tokyo	2019	J1 League	0	0	0	0	0	0	0	0	0	0
FC Tokyo	2020	J1 League	9	0	0	0	0	0	3 (Note: Appearances in AFC Champions League Elite)	0	12	0
FC Tokyo	2021	J1 League	3	1	0	0	2	0	0	0	5	1
FC Tokyo	2022	J1 League	30	2	2	0	3	0	0	0	35	2
FC Tokyo	Total		42	3	2	0	5	0	3	0	52	3
Hosei University	2019	–			3	0	–		–		3	0
FC Tokyo U-23 (loan)	2019	J3 League	4	0	–		–		–		4	0
Avispa Fukuoka	2023	J1 League	29	5	4	0	8	0	–		41	5
Avispa Fukuoka	2024	J1 League	37	6	1	0	2	0	–		40	6
Avispa Fukuoka	2025	J1 League	36	3	2	0	5	2	–		43	5
Avispa Fukuoka	Total		102	14	7	0	15	2	0	0	124	16
Kawasaki Frontale	2026	J1 (100)	7	0	–		–		–		7	0
Career total			155	17	12	0	20	2	3	0	190	19

== Honours ==
=== Club ===
FC Tokyo

- J.League Cup: 2020

Avispa Fukuoka

- J.League Cup: 2023
