= Masaya Tashiro =

Japanese footballer

Masaya Tashiro 田代雅也
Personal information
- Full name: Masaya Tashiro
- Date of birth: 1 May 1993 (age 33)
- Place of birth: Saitama, Japan
- Height: 1.85 m (6 ft 1 in)
- Position: Centre back

Team information
- Current team: Avispa Fukuoka
- Number: 37

Youth career
- Kitamachi SSS
- 2006–2008: Bunan JYFC
- 2009–2011: Bunan High School

College career
| Years | Team | Apps | (Gls) |
| 2012–2015 | Hosei University | | |

Senior career*
| Years | Team | Apps | (Gls) |
| 2016–2018 | FC Gifu | 28 | (1) |
| 2018–2021 | Tochigi SC | 89 | (6) |
| 2021–2023 | Sagan Tosu | 52 | (3) |
| 2023– | Avispa Fukuoka | 83 | (3) |
- * Club domestic league appearances and goals as of 12 August 2026

Masaya Tashiro (田代雅也, Tashiro, Masaya; born 1 May 1993) is a Japanese professional footballer who plays as a centre back for J1 League club Avispa Fukuoka.

== Career ==
On 7 July 2024, Tashiro made his 200th J League appearance against Kyoto Sanga.

== Club statistics ==
As of 25 July 2023.

Appearances and goals by club, season and competition
| Club | Season | League | | | Emperor's Cup | | J. League Cup | | Total | |
| Club | Season | Division | Apps | Goals | Apps | Goals | Apps | Goals | Apps | Goals |
|---|---|---|---|---|---|---|---|---|---|---|
| FC Gifu | 2016 | J2 League | 28 | 1 | 1 | 0 | - | | 29 | 1 |
| FC Gifu | 2017 | J2 League | 0 | 0 | 0 | 0 | - | | 0 | 0 |
| FC Gifu | Total | | 28 | 1 | 1 | 0 | 0 | 0 | 29 | 1 |
| Tochigi SC | 2018 | J2 League | 20 | 0 | 0 | 0 | - | | 20 | 0 |
| Tochigi SC | 2019 | J2 League | 28 | 3 | 1 | 0 | - | | 29 | 3 |
| Tochigi SC | 2020 | J2 League | 41 | 3 | 0 | 0 | - | | 41 | 3 |
| Tochigi SC | Total | | 89 | 6 | 1 | 0 | 0 | 0 | 90 | 6 |
| Sagan Tosu | 2021 | J1 League | 15 | 0 | 2 | 0 | 5 | 1 | 22 | 1 |
| Sagan Tosu | 2022 | J1 League | 21 | 3 | 2 | 0 | 4 | 1 | 27 | 4 |
| Sagan Tosu | 2023 | J1 League | 16 | 0 | 1 | 0 | 4 | 0 | 21 | 0 |
| Sagan Tosu | Total | | 52 | 3 | 5 | 0 | 13 | 2 | 70 | 5 |
| Avispa Fukuoka | 2023 | J1 League | 0 | 0 | 0 | 0 | 0 | 0 | 0 | 0 |
| Career total | | | 169 | 10 | 7 | 0 | 13 | 2 | 189 | 12 |
