= Masato Yuzawa =

Japanese footballer (born 1993)

Masato Yuzawa 湯澤 聖人
Personal information
- Full name: Masato Yuzawa
- Date of birth: 10 October 1993 (age 33)
- Place of birth: Tsukuba, Ibaraki, Japan
- Height: 1.79 m (5 ft 10 in)
- Position: Right back

Team information
- Current team: Avispa Fukuoka
- Number: 2

Youth career
- Yatabe FC
- 2006–2008: Tsukuba FC
- 2009–2011: RKU Kashiwa High School

College career
Years	Team	Apps	(Gls)
2012–2015	Ryutsu Keizai University		

Senior career*
Years	Team	Apps	(Gls)
2016–2017	Kashiwa Reysol	11	(0)
2017	→ Kyoto Sanga FC (loan)	9	(0)
2018–2019	Ventforet Kofu	42	(2)
2020–	Avispa Fukuoka	147	(2)
- * Club domestic league appearances and goals as of 12 August 2026

Masato Yuzawa (湯澤 聖人, Yuzawa Masato; born 10 October 1993) is a Japanese footballer who plays as a right back for J1 League club Avispa Fukuoka.

== Career ==
On 27 December 2019, Yuzawa was announced at Avispa Fukuoka. On 7 December 2021, the club extended his contract for the 2022 season. On 2 December 2022, Yuzawa's contract with the club was extended for the 2023 season. On 22 December 2023, the club extended his contract for the 2024 season. On 4 December 2024, Yuzawa's contract was extended for the 2025 season.

== Club statistics ==
As of 20 April 2026.

Appearances and goals by club, season and competition
Club	Season	League			National cup (Note: Includes Emperors Cup)		League cup (Note: Includes J.League Cup)		Other		Total	
Club	Season	Division	Apps	Goals	Apps	Goals	Apps	Goals	Apps	Goals	Apps	Goals
Ryutsu Keizai University	2015	–			2	0	–		–		2	0
Kashiwa Reysol	2016	J1 League	11	0	1	0	3	0	–		15	0
Kyoto Sanga (loan)	2017	J2 League	9	0	–		–		–		9	0
Ventforet Kofu	2018	J2 League	27	2	1	0	2	0	0	0	30	2
Ventforet Kofu	2019	J2 League	14	0	3	0	0	0	1 (Note: Appearance in J1/J2 play-offs)	0	18	0
Ventforet Kofu	Total		41	2	4	0	2	0	1	0	48	2
Avispa Fukuoka	2020	J2 League	26	0	0	0	0	0	–		26	0
Avispa Fukuoka	2021	J1 League	30	0	2	0	6	0	–		38	0
Avispa Fukuoka	2022	J1 League	26	0	4	0	10	0	–		40	0
Avispa Fukuoka	2023	J1 League	26	1	3	0	7	1	–		36	2
Avispa Fukuoka	2024	J1 League	15	0	0	0	0	0	–		15	0
Avispa Fukuoka	2025	J1 League	20	1	2	0	2	0	–		24	1
Avispa Fukuoka	2026	J1 (100)	2	0	0	0	0	0	–		2	0
Avispa Fukuoka	Total		145	2	11	0	25	1	0	0	181	3
Career total			206	4	18	0	30	1	1	0	255	5

== Honours ==
=== Club ===
Avispa Fukuoka

- J.League Cup: 2023
