= Takumi Nagaishi =

Japanese footballer (born 1996)

Takumi Nagaishi 永石 拓海
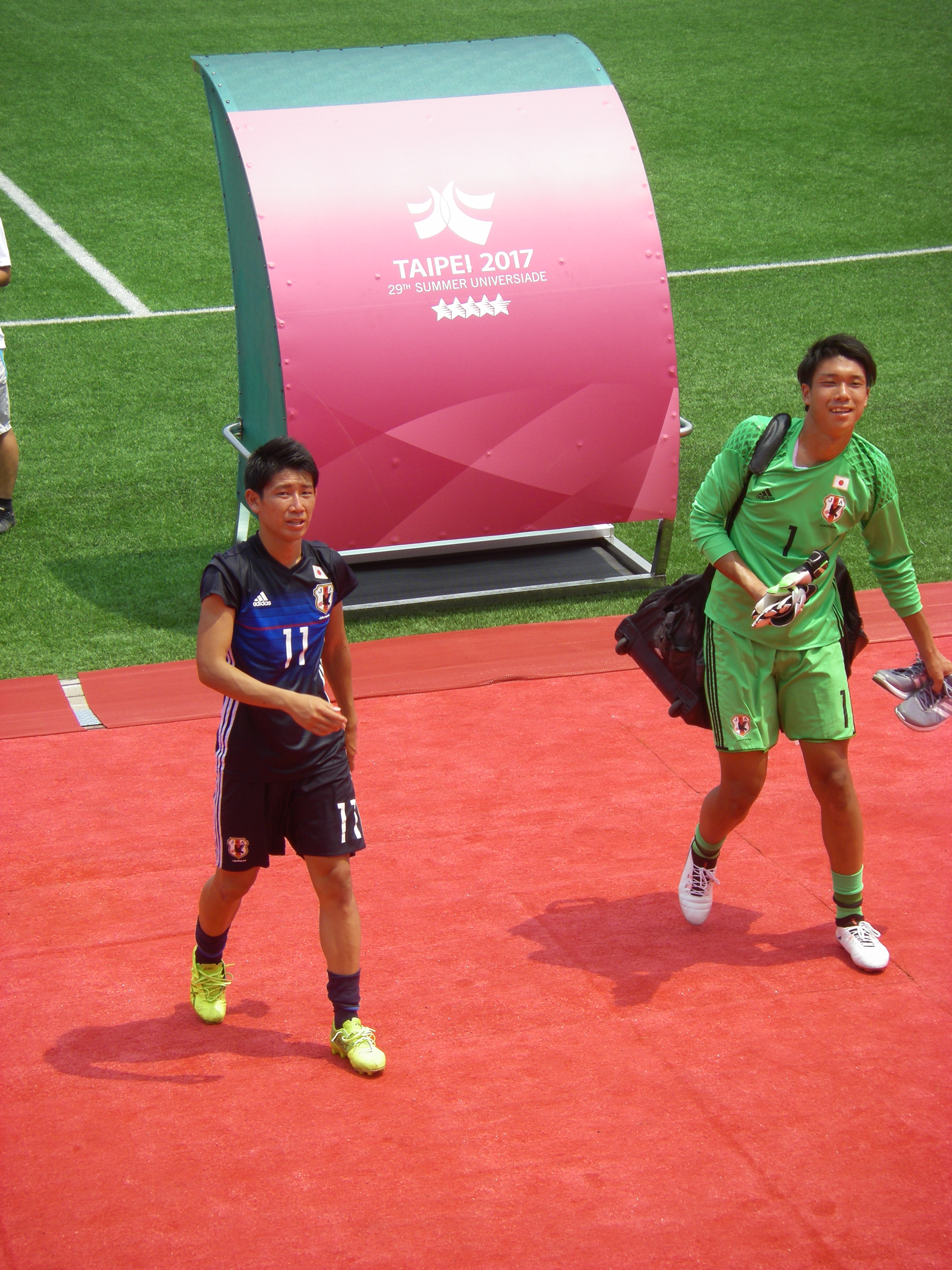
- Takumi Nagaishi representing Japan U20 in 2017.

Personal information
- Full name: Takumi Nagaishi
- Date of birth: 16 February 1996 (age 30)
- Place of birth: Yamaguchi, Japan
- Height: 1.91 m (6 ft 3 in)
- Position: Goalkeeper

Team information
- Current team: Avispa Fukuoka
- Number: 1

Youth career
- 2002–2008: Mure FC
- 2008–2010: Kokufu Junior High School
- 2011–2013: Takagawa Gakuen High School

College career
Years	Team	Apps	(Gls)
2014–2017	Fukuoka University		

Senior career*
Years	Team	Apps	(Gls)
2015	→ Sagan Tosu (loan)	0	(0)
2017	→ Cerezo Osaka (loan)	0	(0)
2018–2020	Cerezo Osaka	0	(0)
2018	→ Cerezo Osaka U-23	16	(0)
2019	→ Renofa Yamaguchi (loan)	0	(0)
2021	→ Avispa Fukuoka (loan)	0	(0)
2022–	Avispa Fukuoka	40	(0)
2026	→ Tokushima Vortis (loan)	13	(0)
- * Club domestic league appearances and goals as of 12 Auugst 2026

Takumi Nagaishi (永石 拓海, Nagaishi Takumi; born 16 February 1996, in Yamaguchi) is a Japanese footballer who plays for Avispa Fukuoka.

== Career ==
=== Sagan Tosu ===
While attending Fukuoka University, Nagaishi was signed as a special designated player by Sagan Tosu. He did not make any league appearances during his time, but was named on the bench once against Shonan Bellmare.

=== Cerezo Osaka ===
Cerezo Osaka signed him as a special designated player in May 2017. He would also be joining the team from the 2018 season. Nagaishi made the bench 20 times for Cerezo Osaka, but didn't make any appearances - his earliest benched league game is against Consadole Sapporo on 9 September 2020.

=== Loan to Cerezo U-23 ===
Nagaishi made his league debut against Kataller Toyama on 21 March 2018.

=== Loan to Renofa Yamaguchi ===
On 7 January 2019, Nagaishi was announced at Renofa Yamaguchi. He did not make any league appearances during his time, but was named on the bench once against Fagiano Okayama.

=== Loan to Avispa Fukuoka ===
On 11 January 2021, Nagaishi was announced at Avispa Fukuoka. He made the bench 18 times for Avispa Fukuoka, but didn't make any appearances - his earliest benched league game is against Yokohama F. Marinos.

=== Avispa Fukuoka ===
On 17 December 2021, Nagaishi was announced at Avispa Fukuoka on a permanent transfer. He made his league debut against FC Tokyo on 2 July 2022. In 2023, Naigaishi was mainly used in the Levain Cup.

== Club statistics ==
As of 5 March 2022.

Appearances and goals by club, season and competition
Club	Season	League			Emperor's Cup		J. League Cup		Total	
Club	Season	Division	Apps	Goals	Apps	Goals	Apps	Goals	Apps	Goals
Cerezo Osaka	2018	J1 League	–		–		–		0	0
Cerezo Osaka U-23	2018	J3 League	11	0	–		–		11	0
Renofa Yamaguchi (loan)	2019	J2 League	–		–		–		0	0
Cerezo Osaka U-23	2020	J3 League	5	0	–		–		5	0
Avispa Fukuoka	2021	J1 League	–		2	0	4	0	6	0
Avispa Fukuoka	2022	J1 League	0	0	0	0	1	0	1	0
Avispa Fukuoka	Total		0	0	2	0	5	0	7	0
Career total			16	0	2	0	5	0	23	0

== Honours ==
=== Club ===
Avispa Fukuoka

- J.League Cup: 2023
