= Reiju Tsuruno =

Japanese footballer

Reiju Tsuruno 鶴野 怜樹
Personal information
- Date of birth: 26 January 2001 (age 25)
- Place of birth: Tsunagi, Kumamoto, Japan
- Height: 1.62 m (5 ft 4 in)
- Position: Forward

Team information
- Current team: Avispa Fukuoka
- Number: 28

Youth career
- FC Villanova Minamata
- 2016–2018: Rissho University Shonan High School

College career
Years	Team	Apps	(Gls)
2019–2022	Fukuoka University		

Senior career*
Years	Team	Apps	(Gls)
2023–	Avispa Fukuoka	31	(1)
2025	→ Ehime FC (loan)	22	(1)
- * Club domestic league appearances and goals as of 12 August 2026

Reiju Tsuruno (鶴野 怜樹, Tsurono Reiju; born 26 January 2001) is a Japanese professional footballer who plays as a forward for J1 League club Avispa Fukuoka.

== Youth career ==
Tsurono's first youth club was FC Villanova Minamata, before going on to represent play for Rissho University Shonan High School. He played 7 times for the school in the Japan High School Soccer Tournament and the Inter High School Championship between 2017 and 2018, scoring 3 goals. He was named as one of the 35 outstanding players of the 2018 Inter High School competition. In 2019, he joined the team at Fukuoka University and was described as an outstanding inter-high player. In his first season, he played 21 times and scored 3 goals, although the majority of his appearances came from the bench. In the 2021 season, it was announced that Tsurono would be joining Avispa Fukuoka for the 2023 season. He was also approved to be a designated special player for the 2021 and 2022 seasons, meaning he could represent both Fukuoka University and Avispa Fukuoka. He did not make any appearances for Avispa during his time as a designated special player. For Fukuoka University, he appeared 40 times and scored 11 goals.

== Club career ==
Tsurono officially joined Avispa Fukuoka for the 2023 season and was given the number 28 shirt. In March, he scored the winning goal on his debut for the club, in a 1–0 J.League Cup victory over Albirex Niigata. Later that month, he made his J1 League debut, appearing as a second-half substitute in a dramatic 2–1 victory over Shonan Bellmare. In April, he scored his first league goal in a 3–1 defeat to Kawasaki Frontale.

In December 2024, it was announced that Tsurono would be joining J2 League club Ehime FC on loan for the 2025 season. He only made 5 starts in his 25 appearances for the club, with his only goal coming in a 2–2 league draw with Sagan Tosu in May. At the end of the season, he returned to his parent club.

== International career ==
In April 2023, Tsurono was named as a member of the Japan national team's U-22 candidate training camp.

== Career statistics ==
=== Club ===
As of 16 March 2026

Appearances and goals by club, season and competition
Club	Season	League			Emperor's Cup		J. League Cup		Total	
Club	Season	Division	Apps	Goals	Apps	Goals	Apps	Goals	Apps	Goals
Fukuoka University	2021	–			1	0	–		1	0
Avispa Fukuoka	2023	J1 League	16	1	3	1	7	3	26	5
Avispa Fukuoka	2024	J1 League	12	0	2	1	1	0	15	1
Avispa Fukuoka	2026	J1 (100)	0	0	–		–		0	0
Avispa Fukuoka	Total		28	1	5	1	8	3	41	6
Ehime FC (loan)	2025	J2 League	22	1	2	0	1	0	25	1
Career total			40	2	7	1	9	3	66	7
