= Yota Maejima =

Japanese footballer (born 1997)

Yota Maejima 前嶋 洋太
Personal information
- Full name: Yota Maejima
- Date of birth: August 12, 1997 (age 29)
- Place of birth: Yokohama, Japan
- Height: 1.78 m (5 ft 10 in)
- Position: Midfielder

Team information
- Current team: Avispa Fukuoka
- Number: 29

Youth career
- 2004–2009: Shirane SC
- 2010–2015: Yokohama FC

Senior career*
Years	Team	Apps	(Gls)
2016–2021	Yokohama FC	28	(1)
2018–2019	→ Kataller Toyama (loan)	61	(9)
2020	→ Mito HollyHock (loan)	36	(4)
2022–	Avispa Fukuoka	125	(2)
- * Club domestic league appearances and goals as of 12 August 2026

Yota Maejima (前嶋 洋太, Maejima Yōta; born August 12, 1997) is a Japanese football player. He plays for Avispa Fukuoka in the J1 League.

== Career ==
Yota Maejima joined J2 League club Yokohama FC in 2016. On September 22, he debuted in Emperor's Cup (v AC Nagano Parceiro).

In December 2021, it was announced that Maejima would be joining J1 League club Avispa Fukuoka.

== Club statistics ==
As of 2 March 2022.

Appearances and goals by club, season and competition
Club	Season	League			Emperor's Cup		J. League Cup		Total	
Club	Season	Division	Apps	Goals	Apps	Goals	Apps	Goals	Apps	Goals
Yokohama FC	2016	J2 League	–		3	0	–		3	0
Yokohama FC	2017	J2 League	2	0	1	0	–		3	0
Yokohama FC	2021	J1 League	26	1	–		4	0	30	1
Yokohama FC	Total		28	1	4	0	4	0	36	1
Kataller Toyama (loan)	2018	J3 League	29	7	2	0	–		31	7
Kataller Toyama (loan)	2019	J3 League	32	2	3	0	–		35	2
Kataller Toyama (loan)	Total		61	9	5	0	0	0	66	9
Mito Hollyhock (loan)	2020	J2 League	36	4	–		–		36	4
Avispa Fukuoka	2022	J1 League	2	1	0	0	1	0	3	1
Career total			127	15	9	0	5	0	141	15
