= Takeshi Kanamori =

Japanese footballer (born 1994)

Takeshi Kanamori 金森 健志
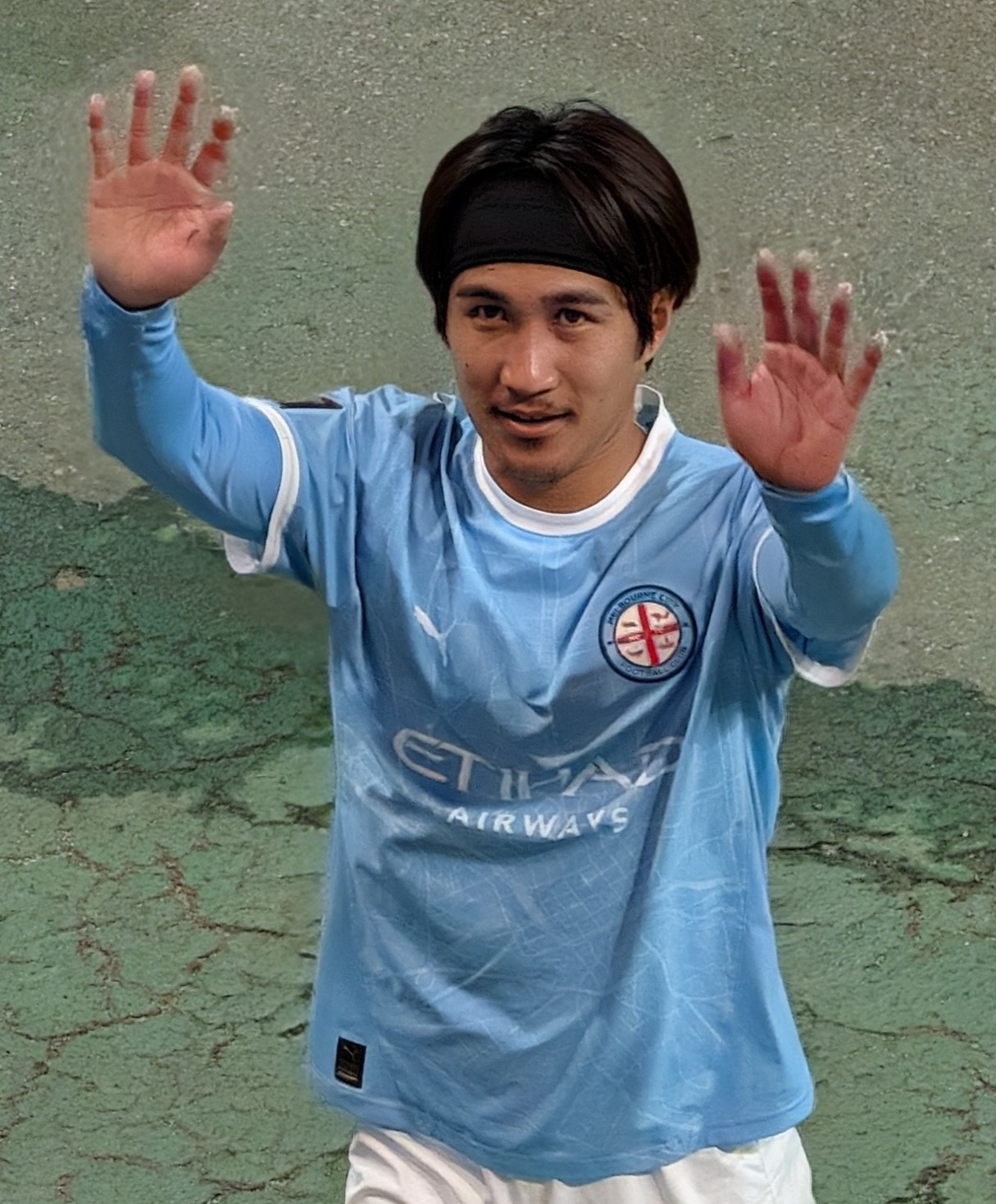
- Kanamori with Melbourne City in 2025.

Personal information
- Full name: Takeshi Kanamori
- Date of birth: 4 April 1994 (age 32)
- Place of birth: Fukuoka, Japan
- Height: 1.71 m (5 ft 7 in)
- Position: Forward

Team information
- Current team: Melbourne City
- Number: 77

Youth career
- Wakahisa SSS
- 2007–2009: Chikuyo Gakuen Junior High School
- 2010–2012: Chikuyo Gakuen High School

Senior career*
Years	Team	Apps	(Gls)
2013–2016	Avispa Fukuoka	132	(25)
2017–2019	Kashima Antlers	26	(2)
2019	→ Sagan Tosu (loan)	14	(0)
2020	Sagan Tosu	26	(2)
2021–2025	Avispa Fukuoka	131	(9)
2025–	Melbourne City	14	(1)
Medal record
Kashima Antlers
Winner	AFC Champions League	2018
Runner-up	J1 League	2017
- * Club domestic league appearances and goals as of 26 June 2026

Takeshi Kanamori (金森 健志, Kanamori Takeshi; pronounced [kana̠moɾi takeɕi]; born 4 April 1994) is a Japanese footballer who plays for A-League Men club Melbourne City.

== Career ==
=== First spell at Avispa Fukuoka ===
Kanamori made his league debut against Tokyo Verdy on 3 March 2013. He scored his first league goal against Thespa Gunma on 17 April 2013, scoring in the 15th minute.

=== Kashima Antlers ===
On 28 December 2016, Kanamori was announced at Kashima Antlers. He made his league debut against Kawasaki Frontale on 19 May 2017. Kanamori scored his first league goal against Kashiwa Reysol on 6 November 2018, scoring in the 6th minute.

=== Loan to Sagan Tosu ===
On 29 July 2019, Kanamori was announced at Sagan Tosu. He made his league debut against Oita Trinita on 4 August 2019.

=== Sagan Tosu ===
Kanamori made his league debut against Kawasaki Frontale on 22 February 2020. He scored his first league goal against Yokohama FC on 5 September 2020, scoring in the 11th minute.

Kanamori had initially been registered at Sagan Tosu for the 2021 season.

=== Second spell at Avispa Fukuoka ===
On 18 February 2021, Kanamori was announced at Avispa Fukuoka. He made his league debut against Nagoya Grampus on 28 February 2021. Kanamori scored his first league goal against Tokushima Vortis on 13 March 2021, scoring a penalty in the 68th minute.

== Personal life ==
Kanamori is married.

== Career statistics ==
=== Club ===
As of match played 6 August 2025.

Appearances and goals by club, season and competition
Club	Season	League			Cup		League Cup		Continental		Total	
Club	Season	Division	Apps	Goals	Apps	Goals	Apps	Goals	Apps	Goals	Apps	Goals
Avispa Fukuoka	2013	J2 League	37	6	0	0	—		—		37	6
Avispa Fukuoka	2014	J2 League	30	9	0	0	—		—		30	9
Avispa Fukuoka	2015	J2 League	32	6	2	0	—		—		34	6
Avispa Fukuoka	2016	J1 League	33	4	2	1	5	2	—		40	7
Avispa Fukuoka	Total		132	25	4	1	5	2	—		141	28
Kashima Antlers	2017	J1 League	5	0	1	1	0	0	4	0	10	1
Kashima Antlers	2018	J1 League	14	2	2	0	3	0	8	0	27	2
Kashima Antlers	2019	J1 League	7	0	1	1	0	0	4	1	12	2
Kashima Antlers	Total		26	2	4	2	3	0	16	1	39	5
Sagan Tosu (loan)	2019	J1 League	14	0	0	0	0	0	—		14	0
Sagan Tosu	2020	J1 League	26	2	—		1	0	—		27	2
Sagan Tosu	Total		40	2	0	0	1	0	—		41	2
Avispa Fukuoka	2021	J1 League	37	4	1	0	3	0	—		41	4
Avispa Fukuoka	2022	J1 League	26	0	4	1	5	0	—		35	1
Avispa Fukuoka	2023	J1 League	28	3	4	1	8	0	—		40	4
Avispa Fukuoka	2024	J1 League	27	1	1	1	2	0	—		30	2
Avispa Fukuoka	2025	J1 League	13	1	3	0	3	0	—		19	1
Avispa Fukuoka	Total		131	9	13	3	21	0	—		165	12
Melbourne City FC	2025	A League Men	2	1	0	0	0	0	1	1	3	2
Total			328	38	19	5	29	2	16	1	396	46
