= Kimiya Moriyama =

Japanese footballer

Kimiya Moriyama 森山 公弥
Personal information
- Date of birth: 4 April 2002 (age 24)
- Place of birth: Fukuoka, Japan
- Height: 1.78 m (5 ft 10 in)
- Position: Defender

Team information
- Current team: Oita Trinita (on loan from Avispa Fukuoka)
- Number: 44

Youth career
- Namazuta FC
- 2015–2020: Avispa Fukuoka

Senior career*
Years	Team	Apps	(Gls)
2021–	Avispa Fukuoka	3	(0)
2025–2026	→ Ehime FC (loan)	45	(3)
2026–	→ Oita Trinita (loan)	0	(0)

International career^{‡}
2020	Japan U18		
- * Club domestic league appearances and goals as of 16 August 2026 ‡ National team caps and goals as of 17:04, 22 April 2021 (UTC)

Kimiya Moriyama (森山 公弥, Moriyama Kimiya; born 4 April 2002) is a Japanese footballer currently playing as a defender for J2 League club Oita Trinita, on loan from Avispa Fukuoka.

== Career statistics ==
=== Club ===
As of end of 2024 season.

Appearances and goals by club, season and competition
Club	Season	League			Emperor's Cup		J. League Cup		Other		Total	
Club	Season	Division	Apps	Goals	Apps	Goals	Apps	Goals	Apps	Goals	Apps	Goals
Avispa Fukuoka	2021	J1 League	0	0	1	0	2	0	—		3	0
Avispa Fukuoka	2022	J1 League	0	0	4	1	5	0	—		9	1
Avispa Fukuoka	2023	J1 League	1	0	0	0	6	0	—		7	0
Avispa Fukuoka	2024	J1 League	2	0	1	0	2	0	—		5	0
Avispa Fukuoka	Total		3	0	6	1	15	0	0	0	24	1
Ehime FC (loan)	2025	J2 League	0	0	0	0	0	0	–		0	0
Career total			3	0	6	1	15	0	0	0	24	1
