= Daiki Miya =

Japanese footballer

Daiki Miya 宮 大樹

Personal information
- Full name: Daiki Miya
- Date of birth: April 1, 1996 (age 30)
- Place of birth: Osaka, Japan
- Height: 1.86 m (6 ft 1 in)
- Position: Centre back

Team information
- Current team: Avispa Fukuoka
- Number: 38

Youth career
- 2000–2010: Osaka Central FC
- 2011–2013: Seimei Gakuin High School

College career
Years	Team	Apps	(Gls)
2014–2017	Biwako Seikei Sport College		

Senior career*
Years	Team	Apps	(Gls)
2018–2019	Vissel Kobe	16	(0)
2019	→ Mito HollyHock (loan)	12	(2)
2020	Sagan Tosu	14	(0)
2021–2024	Avispa Fukuoka	90	(3)
2025–2026	Nagoya Grampus	5	(0)
2025	→ Hokkaido Consadole Sapporo (loan)	9	(0)
2026–	Avispa Fukuoka	5	(0)
- * Club domestic league appearances and goals as of 12 August 2026

Daiki Miya (宮 大樹, Miya Daiki; born April 1, 1996) is a Japanese professional footballer who plays as a centre back for J1 League club Avispa Fukuoka.

== Career ==
While playing for Biwako Seikei Sport College, Miya was selected as the best player in the Kansai Student Football League. In January 2018, Vissel Kobe opted to sign him.

On 6 January 2021, Miya was announced at Avispa Fukuoka on a permanent transfer.

On 26 December 2024, Miya was announced at Nagoya Grampus.

== Club statistics ==
As of 30 April 2026.

Appearances and goals by club, season and competition
Club	Season	League			National cup (Note: Includes Emperors Cup)		League cup (Note: Includes J.League Cup)		Total	
Club	Season	Division	Apps	Goals	Apps	Goals	Apps	Goals	Apps	Goals
Biwako Seikei Sport College	2014	–			2	1	–		2	1
Vissel Kobe	2018	J1 League	5	0	2	0	4	0	11	0
Vissel Kobe	2019	J1 League	11	0	0	0	5	0	16	0
Vissel Kobe	Total		16	0	2	0	9	0	27	0
Mito HollyHock (loan)	2019	J2 League	12	2	1	0	–		13	2
Sagan Tosu	2020	J1 League	14	0	–		1	0	15	0
Avispa Fukuoka	2021	J1 League	26	0	2	0	5	0	33	0
Avispa Fukuoka	2022	J1 League	27	2	1	0	8	0	36	2
Avispa Fukuoka	2023	J1 League	15	0	2	0	5	1	22	1
Avispa Fukuoka	2024	J1 League	22	1	2	0	0	0	24	1
Avispa Fukuoka	Total		90	3	7	0	18	1	115	4
Nagoya Grampus	2025	J1 League	5	0	–		1	0	6	0
Hokkaido Consadole Sapporo (loan)	2025	J2 League	9	0	1	0	–		10	0
Avispa Fukuoka	2026	J1 (100)	3	0	0	0	0	0	3	0
Career total			149	5	13	1	29	1	191	7

== Honours ==
=== Club ===
Avispa Fukuoka

- J.League Cup: 2023
