= Avispa Fukuoka =

Japanese football team

Avispa Fukuoka アビスパ福岡
- Full name: Avispa Fukuoka
- Nicknames: Avi, Hachi (Hornet, in Japanese), Meishu
- Founded: 1982; 44 years ago as Chūō Bōhan SC
- Stadium: Best Denki Stadium; Hakata-ku, Fukuoka
- Capacity: 22,563
- Chairman: Takashi Kawamori
- Manager: Hiroshi Jofuku
- League: J1 League
- 2026: J1 League, 19th of 20
- Website: www.avispa.co.jp
Home colours	Away colours

Avispa Fukuoka (アビスパ福岡, Abisupa Fukuoka) is a Japanese professional football club based in Hakata, Fukuoka. They currently compete in the J1 League, which is the top tier of football in the country.

== History ==
=== Earlier years in Fujieda ===
The club were originally based in Fujieda, Shizuoka and was founded as Chūō Bōhan SC in 1982 by the workers of security company Chuo Bohan in Fujieda, Shizuoka. They were promoted to the Japan Soccer League Division 2 in 1991. The club then participated in the newly founded former Japan Football League Division 2 in 1992 and were promoted to Division 1 in 1993. They changed their name to Fujieda Blux with intention to be a J.League member. However, with difficulties to have a stadium that met J.League requirements, and with local competition from Júbilo Iwata and Shimizu S-Pulse, the football fan base in Shizuoka prefecture was already considered saturated.

=== Move to Fukuoka (1994) ===
As a result, in 1994, the club decided to move to Fukuoka where the community was eager to have a J.League club. They adopted new name Fukuoka Blux and became a J.League associate member, while the amateur club of Chūō Bōhan was active in Fujieda until 2006.

=== 1995 (JFL) ===
The first season in Fukuoka saw them win the JFL championship with help from Argentine Hugo Maradona and they were promoted to J.League. After becoming the champions of 1995 Japan Football League as Fukuoka Blux the team was admitted to the J.League in 1996 season.

=== 1996–1998 (J.League) ===
Fukuoka Blux eventually decided to change their name to Avispa Fukuoka, in order to avoid a potential trademark dispute with men's clothier Brooks Brothers. "Avispa" itself means "wasp" in Spanish. The club acquired experienced players such as former Japanese international Satoshi Tsunami and defender Hideaki Mori but they finished lowly 15th in the 1996 season.

They finished bottom of the league two consecutive seasons (1997 to 1998), but were able to narrowly avoid relegation. This was because J.League were building foundation of J.League 2 for 1999. Therefore, no clubs were relegated and there were relegation/promotion play-offs for the first time at the end of 1998 season, in which Avispa were involved. Around this time, forward Yoshiteru Yamashita and midfielder Chikara Fujimoto were chosen for the Japanese national team.

=== 1999–2001 (J1) ===
In 1999, they again reinforced the squad by acquiring experienced players such as former internationals Nobuyuki Kojima and Yasutoshi Miura as well as Yugoslavian Nenad Maslovar. They won a fierce relegation battle and eventually stayed up. In 2000, Argentine David Bisconti and Romanian Pavel Badea were transferred to Fukuoka and they finished club record 6th in the second stage. In 2001, the club acquired former Korean international Noh Jung-Yoon and Yoshika Matsubara but they finished 15th and were relegated to J2.

=== 2002–2005 (J2) ===
In 2002, they kept experienced players and released younger players such as Daisuke Nakaharai and Yoshiteru Yamashita but they finished 8th out of 10. In 2002, with new manager Hiroshi Matsuda, they decided to recruit and nurture young players who graduated from local high schools instead of acquiring experienced footballers from other clubs. They initially struggled but came back well and finished 4th. In 2004, they finished 3rd and qualified for the play-offs but Kashiwa Reysol dashed their promotion hope by beating them home and away (the scoreline was both 2–0). In 2005, they finished 2nd and gained an automatic promotion to J1. Avispa players Hokuto Nakamura and Tomokazu Nagira represented Japan for the 2005 World Youth Championship in the Netherlands.

=== 2006 (J1) ===
They had been involved in a relegation battle from the beginning of the season. They finished 16th and were relegated to J2 after the promotion/relegation play-offs against Vissel Kobe, which they tied twice, 0–0 in Kobe, then 1–1 at their home game. Like many J2 teams this has led to financial issues. The Daily Yomiuri reported that in 2006 Avispa needed 535 million yen in loans from the local prefectural and municipal governments.

=== 2007–2008 (J2) ===
With relegation came another new manager, the former German international Pierre Littbarski. "Litti" arrived from the Australian A-League, bringing with him several experienced players such as Mark Rudan, Joel Griffiths and Ufuk Talay, but he was unable to steer Avispa to any notable success. Having finished 7th in 2007, an inability to compete near the top of the league led to Littbarski's sacking in mid-2008. He was replaced by former Avispa player Yoshiyuki Shinoda.

=== 2009 (J2) ===
The departure of Littbarski coincided with the departure of the club's Australian players, who were largely replaced with youngsters from a number of Kyushu-based universities. After a reasonable start, Avispa's form has tailed off sharply, with a recent five-game losing streak including 6–0 and 5–0 thrashings away at Ventforet Kofu and Mito HollyHock respectively. The club finished in the lower half of the J2 table with promotion hopes dashed for another year.

=== 2010 (J2) ===
Yoshiyuki Shinoda bolstered his squad for the 2010 season by adding more players from local University teams, and picked up midfielders Kosuke Nakamachi and Genki Nagasato who had previously played together at Shonan Bellmare. The season started slowly with the team picking up only 1 point out of a possible 15 in March, but then saw a dramatic improvement in performance as they went on to win 17 of the next 25 games including a come from behind victory against promotion rivals JEF United. As JEF United went on to drop more points Avispa secured promotion back to J1 with 2 games of the season left to play.

Popular striker Tetsuya Okubo was released at the end of the season, along with 4 other players as the squad was prepared for J1.

=== 2011 (J1) ===
Avispa Fukuoka returned to the J1 League in 2011 after earning promotion from J2 the previous season. They struggled throughout the campaign and were relegated after finishing 17th in the table."J1 League 2011 table". Soccerway.

Despite occasional strong performances — including a 5–0 away victory over Montedio Yamagata in November — Avispa were unable to avoid the drop."Montedio Yam 0-5 A Fukuoka". ESPN. 19 November 2011.

=== 2012 (J2) ===
The team was looking to bounce straight back to J1 upon their return to the second tier but endured the worst season in the history of the club as they finished a lowly 18th in the table; only winning 9 games all season and conceding 68 goals (only Gainare Tottori would concede more in the season). The end of the season saw Koji Maeda part ways with the club as they looked to rebuild towards a better 2013.

=== 2013 (J2) ===
The club returned to hiring a non-Japanese manager for the first time since Pierre Littbarski as Slovenian Marijan Pusnik arrived. His arrival saw a greater emphasis given towards the development of young players at the club as rookies Yuta Mishima and Takeshi Kanamori were given chances in the first team.

Results on the pitch immediately improved and the club were competing around the play-off positions until a slump in form mid-season coincided with the announcement that the club needed ¥50 million to remain solvent. The club finished in 14th position, but found the money to stay afloat, with Pusnik agreeing to remain as manager for another season.

=== 2014 (J2) ===
Avispa finished in 16th place. Pušnik's contract was not renewed and he returned to Slovenia.

=== 2015 (J2) ===
The club hired new coach Masami Ihara who twice handled Kashiwa Reysol in a caretaker capacity. They finished third and were promoted back to J1 in winning the promotion playoffs.

=== 2016 (J1) ===
Avispa finished in 18th place and relegated to J2. League.

=== 2017 (J2) ===
Avispa finished in fourth place. In the "J1 promotion play-off", Avispa won the semi-final game 1–0 against Tokyo Verdy. In the final game however, the team had a scoreless draw, 0-0, with Nagoya Grampus leaving them in third place, meaning Avispa could not be promoted to J1.

=== 2021–present (J1) ===
A second-place finish in the 2020 J2 League saw Avispa returned to J1 League for the first time since 2016.

On 4 November 2023, Avispa won the J.League Cup by defeating two-time winners Urawa Red Diamonds 2–1 in the final match of 2023 edition. It was the first major trophy in the history of the club.

On 31 October 2024, it was announced that head coach Shigetoshi Hasebe who has led Avispa for five years, would be leaving the club at the end of the season.

== Current players ==
As of 3 September 2026.

Note: Flags indicate national team as defined under FIFA eligibility rules; some limited exceptions apply. Players may hold more than one non-FIFA nationality.

No.	Pos.	Nation	Player
1	GK	JPN	Takumi Nagaishi
2	DF	JPN	Masato Yuzawa
5	DF	JPN	Takumi Kamijima
6	MF	JPN	Masato Shigemi
7	FW	JPN	Shosei Usui
8	MF	JPN	Kōhei Okuno
9	FW	BRA	Werik Popó
10	FW	JPN	Hisashi Jogo
11	MF	JPN	Tomoya Miki
13	FW	JPN	Shu Morooka
14	MF	JPN	Shintaro Nago
15	DF	JPN	Yuma Tsujioka
16	DF	JPN	Teppei Oka (on loan from FC Tokyo)
17	MF	JPN	Hiroki Akino
18	FW	JPN	Sonosuke Sato
20	DF	JPN	KennedyEgbus Mikuni (on loan from Nagoya Grampus)
21	MF	ESP	Oriol Romeu
22	FW	JPN	Kazuki Fujimoto
23	DF	JPN	Daiki Fukazawa
24	GK	JPN	Yuma Obata

No.	Pos.	Nation	Player
25	MF	JPN	Yuji Kitajima
28	FW	JPN	Reiju Tsuruno
29	DF	JPN	Yota Maejima
32	FW	JPN	Abdul Hanan Sani Brown
33	DF	JPN	Kaoru Yamawaki
34	MF	JPN	Keiya Shiihashi
37	DF	JPN	Masaya Tashiro
38	DF	JPN	Daiki Miya
41	GK	JPN	Kazuki Fujita
46	MF	JPN	Kazuki Fukushima
47	DF	JPN	Yu Hashimoto
49	FW	JPN	Ichika Maeda
52	MF	JPN	Shohei Takemoto
53	MF	JPN	Hikaru Maeda
55	FW	JPN	Kokoro Maeda ^{DSP}
56	DF	JPN	Yuhi Sakai ^{DSP}
57	FW	JPN	Ryusei Kitahama ^{DSP}
58	MF	JPN	Takezo Fujikawa ^{Type 2}
99	GK	JPN	Powell Obinna Obi

=== Out on loan ===
Note: Flags indicate national team as defined under FIFA eligibility rules; some limited exceptions apply. Players may hold more than one non-FIFA nationality.

No.	Pos.	Nation	Player
—	DF	JPN	Seiya Inoue (at Oita Trinita)
—	MF	JPN	Daiki Matsuoka (at (Slovakia) Slovan Bratislava)
—	FW	JPN	Yutaka Michiwaki (at Iwaki FC)
—	DF	JPN	Tatsuki Nara (at (Australia) Macarthur FC)

No.	Pos.	Nation	Player
—	DF	JPN	Kimiya Moriyama (at Oita Trinita)
—	GK	JPN	Kazuaki Suganuma (at FC Gifu)
—	DF	KOR	Kim Moon-hyeon (at Kagoshima United)

== Club officials ==
Position	Staff
Manager	(Japan) Hiroshi Jofuku
Assistant manager	(Japan) Takeshi Hanita
Coaches	(Japan) Yuto Kuwahara
Goalkeeping coach	(Japan) Hideki Tsukamoto
Conditioning coach	(Japan) Sotaro Higuchi
Interpreter	(Japan) Atsushi Kamiyama (Brazil) Gustavo De Marco
Chief trainer	(Japan) Eiji Miyata
Athletic trainer	(Japan) Naoki Yoshioka (Japan) Naoki Nagai (Japan) Toshiki Okuno
Kit manager	(Japan) Ryuya Muto (Japan) Takuna Nakano
Competent	(Japan) Eishi Nakamura

== Managerial history ==
Manager	Nationality	Tenure	
Manager	Nationality	Start	Finish
Yoshio Kikugawa	Japan	1 January 1982	31 December 1994
Jorge Olguín	Argentina	1 July 1993	31 December 1995
Hidehiko Shimizu	Japan	1 February 1996	31 January 1997
Carlos Pachamé	Argentina	1 January 1997	31 December 1997
Takaji Mori	Japan	1 February 1998	31 January 1999
Yoshio Kikugawa	Japan	1 January 1999	31 December 1999
Nestor Omar Piccoli	Argentina	1 January 2000	31 December 2001
Masataka Imai	Japan	1 February 2002	28 July 2002
Tasuya Mochizuki	Japan	29 July 2002	14 August 2002
Shigekazu Nakamura	Japan	15 August 2002	31 January 2003
Hiroshi Matsuda	Japan	1 February 2003	7 May 2006
Ryōichi Kawakatsu	Japan	8 May 2006	31 January 2007
Hitoshi Okino	Japan	11 December 2006	31 January 2007
Pierre Littbarski	Germany	1 February 2007	11 July 2008
Yoshiyuki Shinoda	Japan	15 July 2008	3 August 2011
Tetsuya Asano	Japan	3 August 2011	31 December 2011
Kōji Maeda	Japan	1 January 2012	28 October 2012
Futoshi Ikeda	Japan	29 October 2012	31 January 2013
Marijan Pušnik	Slovenia	1 January 2013	31 December 2014
Masami Ihara	Japan	1 February 2015	31 January 2019
Fabio Pecchia	Italy	1 February 2019	3 June 2019
Kiyokazu Kudō	Japan	4 June 2019	31 January 2020
Shigetoshi Hasebe	Japan	1 February 2020	31 January 2025
Kim Myung-hwi	South Korea	1 February 2025	5 January 2026
Shinya Tsukahara	Japan	5 January 2026 (Note: Initially hired on an interim basis, Tsukahara was made permanent manager on 29 May 2026.)	3 November 2026
Hiroshi Jofuku	Japan	6 November 2026	Present

== Kit and colours ==
Season(s)	Main Shirt Sponsor	Collarbone Sponsor		Additional Sponsor(s)					Kit Manufacturer
2018	FJ. Fukuoka Estate	Hakata Green Hotel (Left)	-	Shin Nihon Seiyaku	PIETRO	Hakata Nakasu Fukuya	BIKEN TECHNO	Before the ban is lifted	YONEX
2019	FJ. Fukuoka Estate	Hakata Green Hotel (Left)	-	Shin Nihon Seiyaku	PIETRO	Hakata Nakasu Fukuya	BIKEN TECHNO	Before the ban is lifted	YONEX
2020	FJ. Fukuoka Estate	Hakata Green Hotel (Left)	-	Shin Nihon Seiyaku	Plantel EX	Hakata Nakasu Fukuya	PIETRO		YONEX
2021	Shin Nihon Seiyaku	Hakata Green Hotel (Left)	Japan Park (Right)	DMM Hoken	Yupiesu	Hakata Nakasu Fukuya	PIETRO	-/ BYBIT	YONEX
2022	Shin Nihon Seiyaku	Hakata Green Hotel (Left)	DMM Hoken	BYBIT	Yupiesu	KIRIN Beverage	PIETRO		YONEX
2023	Shin Nihon Seiyaku	Hakata Green Hotel (Left)	Agekke	DMM TV	Yupiesu	Hakata Nakasu Fukuya	PIETRO		YONEX
2024	Shin Nihon Seiyaku	Hakata Green Hotel (Left)	Agekke	APAMAN	Yupiesu	Hakata Nakasu Fukuya	PIETRO		YONEX

=== Kit evolution ===
Home 1st
1996 - 1998	1999 - 2000	2001 - 2002	2003	2004
2005	2006	2007	2008	2009
2010	2011	2012	2013	2014
2015	2016	2017	2018	2019
2020	2021	2022	2023	2024
2025 -

Away 2nd
1996 - 1998	1999 - 2000	2001 - 2002	2003	2004
2005	2006	2007	2008	2009
2010	2011	2012	2013	2014
2015	2016	2017	2018	2019
2020	2021	2022	2023	2024
2025 -

Alternate 3rd / Special
2015; 20th Anniversary	2017; Bee Festival Memorial	2018; Bee Festival Memorial	2019; Hachimatsuri Memorial	2020; 25th Anniversary
2021; Autumn Formation	2022; SP	2023 3rd	2023; SP	2024; SP

== League & cup record ==
Champions	Runners-up	Third place	Promoted	Relegated

League													J.League Cup	Emperor's Cup
Season	Div.	Teams	Pos.	P	W (OT/PK)	D	L (OT/PK)	F	A	GD	Pts	Attendance/G	J.League Cup	Emperor's Cup
1996	J1	16	15th	30	9 (–/–)	–	19 (–/2)	42	64	–22	29	9,737	Group stage	Round of 16
1997	J1	17	17th	32	6 (–/1)	–	20 ((5/–)	29	58	–29	19	8,653	Group stage	Round of 16
1998	J1	18	18th	34	6 (1/1)	–	22 ((2/2)	29	69	–40	21	10,035	Group stage	Round of 16
1999	J1	16	14th	30	7 (3/–)	1	18 (1/–)	41	59	–18	28	11,467	2nd round	Round of 16
2000	J1	16	12th	30	9 (4/–)	2	10 (5/–)	41	48	–7	37	13,612	2nd round	Round of 16
2001	J1	16	15th	30	7 (2/–)	2	14 (5/–)	35	56	–21	27	13,822	2nd round	3rd round
2002	J2	12	8th	44	10	12	22	58	69	–11	42	6,491	Not eligible	Round of 16
2003	J2	12	4th	44	21	8	15	67	62	5	71	7,417	Not eligible	3rd round
2004	J2	12	3rd	44	23	7	14	56	41	15	76	8,743	Not eligible	4th round
2005	J2	12	2nd	44	21	15	8	72	64	8	78	10,786	Not eligible	4th round
2006	J1	18	16th	34	5	12	17	32	56	–24	27	13,780	Group stage	Round of 16
2007	J2	13	7th	48	22	7	19	77	61	16	73	9,529	Not eligible	4th round
2008	J2	15	8th	42	15	13	14	55	66	–10	58	10,079	Not eligible	3rd round
2009	J2	18	11th	51	17	14	20	52	71	–19	65	7,763	Not eligible	3rd round
2010	J2	19	3rd	36	21	9	6	63	34	29	69	8,821	Not eligible	Quarter-finals
2011	J1	18	17th	34	6	4	24	34	75	–42	22	10,415	Group stage	3rd round
2012	J2	22	18th	42	9	14	19	53	68	–15	41	5,586	Not eligible	3rd round
2013	J2	22	14th	42	15	11	16	47	54	–7	56	5,727	Not eligible	2nd round
2014	J2	22	16th	42	13	11	18	52	60	–8	50	5,062	Not eligible	2nd round
2015	J2	22	3rd	42	24	10	8	63	37	26	82	8,736	Not eligible	3rd round
2016	J1	18	18th	34	4	7	23	26	66	–40	19	12,857	Quarter-finals	2nd round
2017	J2	22	4th	42	21	11	10	54	36	18	74	9,550	Not eligible	3rd round
2018	J2	22	7th	42	19	13	10	58	42	16	70	8,873	Not eligible	3rd round
2019	J2	22	16th	42	12	8	22	39	62	–23	44	6,983	Not eligible	3rd round
2020 †	J2	22	2nd	42	25	9	8	51	29	22	84	3,289	Not eligible	Did not qualify
2021	J1	20	8th	38	14	12	12	42	37	5	54	5,403	Group stage	3rd round
2022	J1	18	14th	34	9	11	14	29	38	–9	38	7,150	Semi-finals	Quarter-finals
2023	J1	18	7th	34	15	6	13	37	43	-6	51	8,689	Winners	Semi-finals
2024	J1	20	12th	38	12	14	12	33	38	-5	50	9,698	3rd Round	3rd round
2025	J1	20	12th	38	12	12	14	34	38	-4	48	10,031	Playoff round	Round of 16
2026	J1	10	TBD	18									N/A	N/A
2026-27	J1	20	TBD	38									TBD	TBD

Key

- Pos. = Position in league; P = Games played; W = Games won; D = Games drawn; L = Games lost; F = Goals scored; A = Goals conceded; GD = Goals difference; Pts = Points gained
- Attendance/G = Average home league attendance
- † 2020 season attendance reduced due to COVID-19 pandemic in Japan
- Source: J.League Data Site

== Honours ==
Avispa Fukuoka Honours
Honour	No.	Years
All Japan Senior Football Championship	2	1989, 1990
Japan Football League Division 2 (third tier)	1	1992
Japan Football League (second tier)	1	1995
J.League Cup	1	2023

== Affiliated clubs ==
- (Belgium) Sint-Truidense
- (Thailand) Port FC
