= 2026–27 Nagoya Grampus season =

Nagoya Grampus 2026-27 club season

Nagoya Grampus
2026–27 season
- Owner: Toyota
- Chairman: Toyo Kato
- Manager: Mihailo Petrović
- Stadium: Toyota Stadium; New Paloma Mizuho Stadium
- J1 League: 13th
- Emperor's Cup: Round 2
- J.League Cup: Round 4
- Highest home attendance: 40,494 vs Shimizu S-Pulse (8 August, J-League)
- Lowest home attendance: 4,366 vs Gainare Tottori (26 August; Emperor's Cup)
- Average home league attendance: 31,098
- Biggest win: 3–1 vs Gamba Osaka (22 August; J1 League)
- Biggest defeat: 0-3 vs Sanfrecce Hiroshima (2 September; J-League); 1–3 vs Gainare Tottori (26 August; Emperor's Cup)

The 2026–27 Nagoya Grampus season is their 9th consecutive season in the J1 League since their promotion from the J2 League in 2017. They will also participate in the Emperor's Cup and J-League Cup.

== Squad ==
=== Season squad ===
As of 12 July 2026

Squad no.	Name	Nationality	Date of birth	Last Club
Goalkeepers
1	Daniel Schmidt	(Japan)	3 February 1992 (age 34)	(Belgium) KAA Gent
16	Yohei Takeda	(Japan)	30 June 1987 (age 39)	(Japan) Oita Trinita
35	Alexandre Pisano	(Japan)	10 January 2006 (age 20)	Youth Team
36	Hiroaki Hagi	(Japan)	12 June 2007 (age 19)	Youth Team
Defenders
2	Yuki Nogami	(Japan)	20 April 1991 (age 35)	(Japan) Sanfrecce Hiroshima
3	Yota Sato	(Japan)	10 September 1998 (age 28)	(Japan) Urawa Reds
13	Haruya Fujii	(Japan)	26 December 2000 (age 25)	(Belgium) Kortrijk
37	Harumu Kubo	(Japan)	18 June 2007 (age 19)	(Japan) Maebashi FC
55	Shuhei Tokumoto	(Japan)	12 September 1995 (age 31)	(Japan) FC Tokyo
70	Teruki Hara	(Japan)	30 July 1998 (age 28)	(Japan) Shimizu S-Pulse
Midfielders
7	Ryuji Izumi	(Japan)	6 November 1993 (age 33)	(Japan) Kashima Antlers
9	Yuya Asano	(Japan)	17 February 1997 (age 29)	(Japan) Hokkaido Consadole Sapporo
14	Tsukasa Morishima	(Japan)	25 April 1997 (age 29)	(Japan) Sanfrecce Hiroshima
15	Sho Inagaki	(Japan)	25 December 1991 (age 34)	(Japan) Sanfrecce Hiroshima
17	Takuya Uchida	(Japan)	2 June 1998 (age 28)	(Japan) FC Tokyo
19	Hidemasa Koda	(Japan)	2 October 2003 (age 23)	(Japan) Ehime FC
27	Katsuhiro Nakayama	(Japan)	17 July 1996 (age 30)	(Japan) Shimizu S-Pulse
31	Tomoki Takamine	(Japan)	29 December 1997 (age 28)	(Japan) Hokkaido Consadole Sapporo
33	Taichi Kikuchi	(Japan)	7 May 1995 (age 31)	(Japan) Sagan Tosu
41	Masahito Ono	(Japan)	9 August 1996 (age 30)	(Japan) Montedio Yamagata
58	Tomoya Koyamatsu	(Japan)	24 April 1995 (age 31)	(Japan) Kashiwa Reysol
Forwards
10	Mateus	(Brazil)	11 September 1994 (age 32)	(Saudi Arabia) Al-Taawoun
11	Yuya Yamagishi	(Japan)	29 August 1993 (age 33)	(Japan) Avispa Fukuoka
18	Kensuke Nagai	(Japan)	5 March 1989 (age 37)	(Japan) FC Tokyo
22	Yudai Kimura	(Japan)	28 February 2001 (age 25)	(Japan) Tokyo Verdy
25	Marcus Índio	(Brazil)	24 January 1998 (age 28)	(Japan) FC Imabari
30	Shungo Sugiura	(Japan)	14 May 2006 (age 20)	Youth Team

== Club officials ==
Club officials for 2026-27.

Position	Name
Sport Directors	(Japan) Kenji Hattori
Head Coach	(Serbia) Mihailo Petrović
Coaches	(Japan) Hiromu Watahiki (Japan) Keiji Yoshimura (Japan) Makoto Sunakawa (Japan) Keiji Tamada (Japan) Shunsuke Otsuka
Goalkeeper coach	(Japan) Seigo Narazaki
Assistant goalkeeper coach	(Japan) Toshihide Hirata
Analytical coach	(Japan) Ryosuke Sato (Japan) Kazuki Fukayama
Physical coach	(Japan) Kaito Yamada
Assistant physical coach	(Japan) Shunsuke Ito
Trainer	(Japan) Kazue Hozumi (Japan) Daisuke Adachi (Japan) Hiroki Kondo (Japan) Katsuki Ozaki
Physiotherapist	(Japan) Masakazu Mizutani (Japan) Toru Fujii
Chief doctor	(Japan) Shinya Ishizuka
Doctor	(Japan) Takuya Shimizu (Japan) Seiji Kondo (Japan) Tadahiro Sakai (Japan) Tatsuya Takahashi (Japan) Takafumi Mizuno
Team side manager	(Japan) Ryuki Roppongi
Side affairs	(Japan) Shinichi Kitano (Japan) Shinnosuke Ishizaka (Japan) Yasuhiro Tanigawa
Head of team development	(Japan) Naoshi Nakamura
Team development manager	(Japan) Yuto Ujihira
Dietitian	(Japan) Terumi Sato
Scout	(Japan) Yusuke Nakatani (Japan) Norifumi Takamoto (Japan) Masahiro Koga
Interpreter	(Japan) Tonny Sasaki

== Transfers ==
=== In ===
==== Permanent Transfer ====
Date	Position	Player	From	Fee	Ref
18 June 2026	MF	(Japan) Tomoki Takamine	(Japan) Hokkaido Consadole Sapporo	Undisclosed	

==== Loans ====
Date	Position	Player	From	Date Until	Ref

=== Out ===
==== Permanent Transfer ====
Date	Position	Player	To	Fee	Ref
17 June 2026	MF	(Japan) Keiya Shiihashi	(Japan) Avispa Fukuoka	Undisclosed	

==== Loans ====
Date	Position	Player	To	Date Until	Ref
17 June 2026	DF	(Japan) KennedyEgbus Mikuni	(Japan) Avispa Fukuoka	30 June 2027	
21 June 2026	MF	(Japan) Gen Kato	(Japan) RB Omiya Ardija	30 June 2027	
23 June 2026	DF	(Japan) Ei Gyotoku	(Japan) Nagano Parceiro	30 June 2027	
23 June 2026	DF	(Japan) Soichiro Mori	(Japan) Fagiano Okayama	30 June 2027	
24 June 2026	MF	(Japan) Ken Masui	(Belgium) KV Kortrijk	30 June 2027	
26 June 2026	MF	(Japan) Haruto Suzuki	(Japan) FC Gifu	30 June 2027	
26 June 2026	MF	(Japan) Haruki Yoshida	(Japan) FC Ryukyu	30 June 2027	
27 June 2026	FW	(Japan) Kyota Sakakibara	(Japan) Zweigen Kanazawa	30 June 2027	
30 June 2026	MF	(Japan) Ryosuke Yamanaka	(Japan) Kyoto Sanga	30 June 2027	
12 July 2026	DF	(Japan) Akinari Kawazura	(Japan) Mito HollyHock	30 June 2027	

== Pre-season and friendlies ==
On 25 June 2026, Nagoya Grampus announced a pre-season match against Hokkaido Consadole Sapporo, to be held in Sapporo on 25 July 2026.

25 July 2026 Friendly	Hokkaido Consadole Sapporo	1-0	Nagoya Grampus	Sapporo, Japan
15:00 JST				Stadium: Miyanosawa Shiroi Koibito Soccer Field

Win Draw Loss Fixtures

== Competitions ==
=== J1 League ===
Pos	Team	Pld	W	D	L	GF	GA	GD	Pts
11	Cerezo Osaka	14	4	5	5	16	25	−9	17
12	Kyoto Sanga	14	4	4	6	19	23	−4	16
13	Nagoya Grampus	14	4	2	8	15	23	−8	14
14	Tokyo Verdy	14	3	5	6	12	22	−10	14
15	Shimizu S-Pulse	14	4	2	8	10	23	−13	14

Updated to match(es) played on 8 November 2026. Source: JLeague.jp,
Rules for classification: 1) Points; 2) Goal difference; 3) Goals scored; 4) Head-to-head points; 5) Head-to-head goal difference; 6) Head-to-head goals scored; 7) Fewer disciplinary points.

==== Matches ====
8 August 2026 1	Nagoya Grampus	0–1	Shimizu S-Pulse	Toyota
19:00 JST		Report	Kitagawa 38'; Se-hun (yellow card) 61' (yellow-red card); Park Seung-wook (yellow card) 85'	Stadium: Toyota Stadium; Attendance: 40,494; Referee: Yuzo Sutani

15 August 2026 2	Kashima Antlers	2–1	Nagoya Grampus	Kashima
18:00 JST	Ceara 22'; Misao (yellow card) 25'; Suzuki (yellow card) 45'; Ceara (yellow card) 48'; Uchida 90+8' (o.g.)		Ueda 54' (o.g.); Inagaki (yellow card) 77'	Stadium: Mercari Stadium; Attendance: 33,560; Referee: Florian Exner

22 August 2026 3	Nagoya Grampus	3–1	Gamba Osaka	Toyota
19:00 JST	Kimura 7'; Asano 83'; Ono 90+7'	Report	Meshino 11'; Kishimoto (yellow card) 40'; Hummet (yellow card) 43'; Abe (red card) 86'	Stadium: Toyota Stadium; Attendance: 30,651; Referee: Koki Nagamine

29 August 2026 4	Nagoya Grampus	2–1	Fagiano Okayama	Toyota
19:00 JST	Inagaki 43' (pen.); Asano (yellow card) 66'; Yamagishi (yellow card) 67'; Nakayama 90+1'	Report	Suzuki 38'; Sang-Ho (yellow card) 60'; Gaúcho (yellow card) 70'; Miyamoto (yellow card) 86'	Stadium: Toyota Stadium; Attendance: 38,671; Referee: Hiroki Kasahara

2 September 2026 5	Sanfrecce Hiroshima	3–0	Nagoya Grampus	Hiroshima
19:00 JST	Kato 72'; Suzuki 80'; Matsumoto (yellow card) 87'; Haller 90+1'	Report	Inagaki (yellow card) 17'; Sato (yellow card) 90+5'	Stadium: Edion Peace Wing Hiroshima; Attendance: 26,892; Referee: Hiroyuki Kimura

6 September 2026 6	Nagoya Grampus	1–3	Machida Zelvia	Toyota
18:00 JST	Izumi (yellow card) 43'; Mochizuki 55' (o.g.); Takamine (yellow card) 85'	Report	Shirasaki 45+7'; Akimoto (yellow card) 46'; Pisano 75' (o.g.); Matsuo 97'	Stadium: Toyota Stadium; Attendance: 27,049; Referee: Atsushi Kamimura

12 September 2026 7	V-Varen Nagasaki	2–0	Nagoya Grampus	Nagasaki
19:00 JST	Jesus 36'; Santana 57'	Report	Fujii (yellow card) 90+6'	Stadium: Peace Stadium Connected by SoftBank; Attendance: 18,329; Referee: Akihiko Ikeuchi

19 September 2026 8	FC Tokyo	1–0	Nagoya Grampus	Shinjuku
19:00 JST	Koh (yellow card) 7' (yellow-red card) 68'; Tawaratsumida 56'; Sato (yellow card) 61'; Matsuhashi (yellow card) 78'; Hashimoto (yellow card) 90+3'	Report	Nakayama (yellow card) 90+5'	Stadium: MUFG Stadium; Attendance: 51,557; Referee: César Arturo Ramos

11 October 2026 9	Kawasaki Frontale	1–2	Nagoya Grampus	Kawasaki
16:00 JST	Wakizaka 4'; Yamahara (yellow card) 40'	Report	Fujii 2'; Nagai (yellow card) 11'; Nogami (yellow card) 58'; Yamagishi 73'	Stadium: Uvance Todoroki Stadium by Fujitsu; Attendance: 22,333; Referee: Yuzo Sutani

17 October 2026 10	Kashiwa Reysol	1–3	Nagoya Grampus	Kashiwa
19:00 JST	Koizumi (yellow card) 16'; Endo 23'; Sugioka (yellow card) 52'	Report	Uchida 6'; Kimura 36'; Yamagishi 79'	Stadium: Sankyo Frontier Kashiwa Stadium; Attendance: 13,651; Referee: Akihiko Ikeuchi

21 October 2026 11	Nagoya Grampus	1–1	Cerezo Osaka	Toyota
19:00 JST	Nakayama 3'; Sato (yellow card) 46'		Cools (yellow card) 26'; Kagawa (yellow card) 49'; Sabbag 62'; Fernandes (yellow card) 66'; Okuda (yellow card) 90+4'	Stadium: Toyota Stadium; Attendance: 18,236; Referee: Ryo Tanimoto

25 October 2026 12	Nagoya Grampus	1–1	Yokohama F. Marinos	Toyota
14:00 JST	Uchida (yellow card) 53'; Yamagishi 74'	Report	Croux 14'; Kimura (yellow card) 55'	Stadium: Toyota Stadium; Attendance: 32,754; Referee: Koki Nagamine

31 October 2026 13	Vissel Kobe	3–1	Nagoya Grampus	Kobe
15:00 JST	Yamakawa (yellow card) 21'; Muto 38'; Izumi 47' (o.g.); Komatsu 90+1'	Report	Nagai 2'; Izumi (yellow card) 52'	Stadium: Noevir Stadium Kobe; Attendance: 17,956; Referee: Koji Takasaki

7 November 2026 14	Nagoya Grampus	0–2	Kyoto Sanga	Toyota
14:00 JST	Morishima (yellow card) 82'; Mateus (yellow card) 90+4'	Report	Alex Souza (yellow card) 40' (goal) 43'; Tawiah (yellow card) 45+5'; Yoon 52'	Stadium: Toyota Stadium; Attendance: 29,832; Referee: Keigo Sendachi

21 November 2026 15	Tokyo Verdy	0–0	Nagoya Grampus	Chōfu
14:00 JST	Uchida (yellow card) 18'	Report	Takamine (yellow card) 90+4'	Stadium: Ajinomoto Stadium; Attendance: 15,448; Referee: Yoshimi Yamashita

25 November 2026 16	JEF United Chiba	–	Nagoya Grampus	Chiba
19:00 JST				Stadium: Fukuda Denshi Arena

29 November 2026 17	Nagoya Grampus	–	Avispa Fukuoka	Toyota
15:00 JST				Stadium: Toyota Stadium

5 December 2026 18	Urawa Red Diamonds	–	Nagoya Grampus	Saitama
14:00 JST				Stadium: Saitama Stadium 2002

13 December 2026 19	Nagoya Grampus	–	Mito HollyHock	Toyota
15:00 JST				Stadium: Toyota Stadium

19 December 2026 20	Nagoya Grampus	–	Sanfrecce Hiroshima	Nagoya
14:00 JST				Stadium: New Paloma Mizuho Stadium

13–14 February 2027 21	Nagoya Grampus	–	FC Tokyo	Toyota
				Stadium: Toyota Stadium

20–21 February 2027 22	Avispa Fukuoka	–	Nagoya Grampus	Fukuoka
				Stadium: Best Denki Stadium

27–28 February 2027 23	Nagoya Grampus	–	Urawa Red Diamonds	Toyota
				Stadium: Toyota Stadium

6–7 March 2027 24	Gamba Osaka	–	Nagoya Grampus	Suita
				Stadium: Panasonic Stadium Suita

10 March 2027 25	Nagoya Grampus	–	V-Varen Nagasaki	Toyota
				Stadium: Toyota Stadium

13–14 March 2027 26	Machida Zelvia	–	Nagoya Grampus	Machida
				Stadium: Machida GION Stadium

20–21 March 2027 27	Nagoya Grampus	–	Vissel Kobe	Toyota
				Stadium: Toyota Stadium

3–4 April 2027 28	Fagiano Okayama	–	Nagoya Grampus	Okayama
				Stadium: JFE Harenokuni Stadium

10–11 April 2027 29	Nagoya Grampus	–	Kashima Antlers	Toyota
				Stadium: Toyota Stadium

17–18 April 2027 30	Shimizu S-Pulse	–	Nagoya Grampus	Shimizu
				Stadium: IAI Stadium Nihondaira

24–25 April 2027 31	Nagoya Grampus	–	Kawasaki Frontale	Toyota
				Stadium: Toyota Stadium

29 April 2027 32	Yokohama F. Marinos	–	Nagoya Grampus	Yokohama
				Stadium: Nissan Stadium

3–4 May 2027 33	Nagoya Grampus	–	JEF United Chiba	Toyota
				Stadium: Toyota Stadium

9 May 2027 34	Cerezo Osaka	–	Nagoya Grampus	Osaka
				Stadium: Yodoko Sakura Stadium

15–16 May 2027 35	Nagoya Grampus	–	Kashiwa Reysol	Toyota
				Stadium: Toyota Stadium

22–23 May 2027 36	Mito HollyHock	–	Nagoya Grampus	Mito
				Stadium: K's denki Stadium Mito

29–30 May 2027 37	Kyoto Sanga	–	Nagoya Grampus	Kameoka
				Stadium: Sanga Stadium by Kyocera

6 June 2027 38	Vissel Kobe	–	Tokyo Verdy	Toyota
				Stadium: Toyota Stadium

=== Emperor's Cup ===
26 August Second round	Nagoya Grampus	1–3	Gainare Tottori	Toyota
18:30 JST	Fujii 28'	Report	Shinoda 80', 86'; Kawamura 89'	Stadium: Toyota Stadium; Attendance: 4,366; Referee: Jumpei Iida

=== J.League Cup ===
29 September Second round	Giravanz Kitakyushu	1–3	Nagoya Grampus	Kitakyushu
19:00 JST	Okano (yellow card) 60'; Yoshida 90'	Report	Uchida 18'; Yamagishi 30'; Kimura 68'	Stadium: Mikuni World Stadium Kitakyushu; Attendance: 3,704; Referee: Koichiro Fukushima

14 October Third round	Nagoya Grampus	3–3 (a.e.t.) (4–3 p)	Fagiano Okayama	Gifu
19:00 JST	Koda 32', 46'; Ono 69'	Report	Sueyoshi (yellow card) 9'; Ikedo 28'; Fujii 51' (yellow card) 53'; Kamiya (yellow card) 84'; Léo Gaúcho 88'	Stadium: Gifu Nagaragawa Stadium; Attendance: 4,410; Referee: Koei Koya
	Penalties
	Takamine (penalty scored); Kimura (penalty scored); Sugiura (penalty scored); Koda (penalty scored); Koyamatsu (penalty missed)		Motoyama (penalty scored); Esaka (penalty scored); Miyamoto (penalty scored); Oberdan (penalty missed); Léo Gaúcho (penalty missed)

28 October Fourth round	Nagoya Grampus	1–2 (a.e.t.)	Urawa Reds	Gifu
19:00 JST	Yamagishi 66'; Takamine (yellow card) 107' (yellow-red card) 120+1'	Report	Hayakawa 45+2'; Danilo Boza (yellow card) 76'; Onaiwu (yellow card) 108'; Gustafson (yellow card) 115'; Minamino 117'; Seko (yellow card) 120+1'	Stadium: Gifu Nagaragawa Stadium; Attendance: 7,492; Referee: Koichiro Fukushima

Win Draw Loss

== Team statistics ==
=== Appearances and goals ===
As of 21 November 2026

No.	Pos	Nat	Player	Total		J1 League		Emperor's Cup		J.League Cup	
No.	Pos	Nat	Player	Apps	Goals	Apps	Goals	Apps	Goals	Apps	Goals
1	GK	(Japan) JPN	Daniel Schmidt	12	0	9+0	0	0+0	0	3+0	0
2	DF	(Japan) JPN	Yuki Nogami	16	0	8+5	0	1+0	0	1+1	0
3	DF	(Japan) JPN	Yota Sato	15	0	3+9	0	1+0	0	2+0	0
7	MF	(Japan) JPN	Ryuji Izumi	16	0	15+0	0	0+0	0	0+1	0
9	MF	(Japan) JPN	Yuya Asano	7	1	3+3	1	0+1	0	0+0	0
10	FW	(Brazil) BRA	Mateus	10	0	1+6	0	1+0	0	2+0	0
11	FW	(Japan) JPN	Yuya Yamagishi	18	5	9+6	3	0+0	0	2+1	2
13	DF	(Japan) JPN	Haruya Fujii	15	2	12+0	1	1+0	1	1+1	0
14	MF	(Japan) JPN	Tsukasa Morishima	14	0	6+5	0	0+0	0	3+0	0
15	MF	(Japan) JPN	Sho Inagaki	18	1	15+0	1	0+0	0	3+0	0
16	GK	(Japan) JPN	Yohei Takeda	0	0	0+0	0	0+0	0	0+0	0
17	MF	(Japan) JPN	Takuya Uchida	12	2	10+0	1	0+0	0	1+1	1
18	FW	(Japan) JPN	Kensuke Nagai	10	1	6+3	1	1+0	0	0+0	0
19	MF	(Japan) JPN	Hidemasa Koda	16	2	1+11	0	1+0	0	2+1	2
22	FW	(Japan) JPN	Yudai Kimura	18	3	15+0	2	0+0	0	2+1	1
25	FW	(Brazil) BRA	Marcus Índio	0	0	0+0	0	0+0	0	0+0	0
27	MF	(Japan) JPN	Katsuhiro Nakayama	14	2	13+0	2	0+0	0	1+0	0
30	FW	(Japan) JPN	Shungo Sugiura	6	0	0+2	0	1+0	0	1+2	0
31	MF	(Japan) JPN	Tomoki Takamine	17	0	14+0	0	0+0	0	1+2	0
33	MF	(Japan) JPN	Taichi Kikuchi	3	0	0+1	0	1+0	0	1+0	0
35	GK	(Japan) JPN	Alexandre Pisano	7	0	6+0	0	1+0	0	0+0	0
36	GK	(Japan) JPN	Hiroaki Hagi	0	0	0+0	0	0+0	0	0+0	0
37	DF	(Japan) JPN	Harumu Kubo	1	0	0+0	0	0+1	0	0+0	0
41	MF	(Japan) JPN	Masahito Ono	9	2	0+5	1	1+0	0	2+1	1
44	MF	(Japan) JPN	Odike Chison Taichi	1	0	0+0	0	0+1	0	0+0	0
49	MF	(Japan) JPN	Sakuto Fukaya	2	0	0+0	0	0+1	0	0+1	0
55	DF	(Japan) JPN	Shuhei Tokumoto	12	0	7+2	0	0+0	0	3+0	0
58	MF	(Japan) JPN	Tomoya Koyamatsu	11	0	0+7	0	1+0	0	1+2	0
68	MF	(Japan) JPN	Atsuki Sameshima	1	0	0+0	0	0+0	0	0+1	0
70	DF	(Japan) JPN	Teruki Hara	15	0	12+1	0	0+0	0	1+1	0
