= 2026–27 J.League Cup =

2026/27 Jリーグ ヤマザキビスケット ルヴァンカップ

Tournament details
- Country: Japan
- Dates: 2 September – 8 May
- Teams: 60

Tournament statistics
- Matches played: 60
- Goals scored: 185 (3.08 per match)
- Attendance: 249,405 (4,157 per match)
- Top goal scorer: Rio Nitta (4 goals)
- All statistics correct as of 12:04, 17 November 2026 (UTC).

The 2026–27 J.League Cup, known as the 2026/27 J.League Yamazaki Biscuits Levain Cup (Japanese: 2026/27 Jリーグ ヤマザキビスケット ルヴァンカップ) for sponsorship reasons, is the 34th edition of J.League Cup, a Japanese association football cup competition. It is the third season all 60 J.League clubs participate in the League Cup.

== Format ==
All 60 clubs from the 2026–27 season's J1, J2, and J3 League are participating. The tournament is divided into two sections, each with a different format: the first round and the prime round.

Six clubs are participating in 2026–27 AFC club competitions: Kashima Antlers, Vissel Kobe, Kashiwa Reysol, Kyoto Sanga and Gamba Osaka in the 2026–27 AFC Champions League Elite, and Machida Zelvia in the 2026–27 AFC Champions League Two. These six clubs are seeded according to their combined ranking in the 2025 J1 League and J1 100 Year Vision League standings, which determines their entry point into the competition.

=== First round ===
Kashima and Kobe, the two highest-ranked of the six AFC-competition clubs, are exempted from the first round entirely and advance directly to the prime round.

Machida, Kashiwa, Gamba Osaka and Kyoto, ranked third to sixth respectively among the AFC-competition clubs, are seeded into the fourth round of this bracket, where they face one another (third-ranked vs. sixth-ranked, and fourth-ranked vs. fifth-ranked) rather than entering from the first round proper.

The remaining 54 clubs – 14 from J1 and 20 each from J2 and J3 – are divided into four groups, each contested as a single-elimination tournament.

As a general rule, matches are hosted by the club from the lower division, or, where both clubs are in the same division, by the club that finished lower in the 2025 season. The fourth-round ties involving Machida, Kashiwa, Gamba Osaka and Kyoto are an exception: these are hosted by whichever of the two clubs held the higher combined 2025 ranking (Machida and Kashiwa, respectively).

Extra time and a penalty shootout will be used to decide the winner of any matches ending in a draw.

The six group winners advance to the prime round, joining Kashima and Kobe to make up a field of eight clubs.

The first round groups are as follows:

First round grouping
| Group | Teams | | | |
|---|---|---|---|---|
| 1 | Sanfrecce Hiroshima (J1 4th place) | Shimizu S-Pulse (J1 14th place) | Yokohama F. Marinos (J1 15th place) | Shonan Bellmare (J1 19th place) |
| 1 | Albirex Niigata (J1 20th place) | Montedio Yamagata (J2 10th place) | FC Imabari (J2 11th place) | Tochigi City (J3 1st place) |
| 1 | Vanraure Hachinohe (J3 2nd place) | Zweigen Kanazawa (J3 6th place) | Tochigi SC (J3 7th place) | Thespa Gunma (J3 14th place) |
| 1 | Matsumoto Yamaga (J3 15th place) | | | |
| 2 | Urawa Red Diamonds (J1 7th place) | Fagiano Okayama (J1 13th place) | Nagoya Grampus (J1 16th place) | Yokohama FC (J1 18th place) |
| 2 | Tokushima Vortis (J2 4th place) | Iwaki FC (J2 9th place) | Consadole Sapporo (J2 12th place) | Kataller Toyama (J2 17th place) |
| 2 | Tegevajaro Miyazaki (J3 4th place) | Kagoshima United FC (J3 5th place) | Giravanz Kitakyushu (J3 8th place) | FC Gifu (J3 13th place) |
| 2 | FC Ryukyu (J3 16th place) | | | |
| 3 | Kawasaki Frontale (J1 8th place) | Avispa Fukuoka (J1 12th place) | Tokyo Verdy (J1 17th place) | JEF United Chiba (J2 3rd place) |
| 3 | Júbilo Iwata (J2 5th place) | Sagan Tosu (J2 8th place) | Ventforet Kofu (J2 13th place) | Oita Trinita (J2 16th place) |
| 3 | Roasso Kumamoto (J2 18th place) | FC Osaka (J3 3rd place) | Nara Club (J3 9th place) | SC Sagamihara (J3 12th place) |
| 3 | Kamatamare Sanuki (J3 17th place) | Reilac Shiga (JFL 2nd place) | | |
| 4 | Cerezo Osaka (J1 10th place) | FC Tokyo (J1 11th place) | Mito HollyHock (J2 1st place) | V-Varen Nagasaki (J2 2nd place) |
| 4 | Omiya Ardija (J2 6th place) | Vegalta Sendai (J2 7th place) | Blaublitz Akita (J2 14th place) | Fujieda MYFC (J2 15th place) |
| 4 | Renofa Yamaguchi (J2 19th place) | Ehime FC (J2 20th place) | Fukushima United (J3 10th place) | Gainare Tottori (J3 11th place) |
| 4 | Kochi United (J3 18th place) | Nagano Parceiro (J3 19th place) | | |

=== Prime round ===
The prime round is a single-elimination tournament among the eight qualified clubs, generally hosted at each participating club's home ground, with the exception of the final, which is played at a neutral venue.

The quarter-finals and semi-finals are played over two legs. In the case of a tie, the winner will be determined firstly by goal difference, then extra time and a penalty shootout if necessary.

The final is a single match, also decided by extra time and then a penalty shootout if required.

=== Prize money ===
The top three teams at the end of the tournament receive prize money of ¥150 million (US$947,472.14) for the winners, ¥50 million (US$315,824.05) for runners-up, and ¥25 million (US$157,912.02) for third place.

== Schedule ==
The schedule was announced on 22 June 2026.

| Stage | Round | Date |
|---|---|---|
| First round | Round 1 | 2–9 September |
| First round | Round 2 | 29 September |
| First round | Round 3 | 14 October |
| First round | Round 4 | 28 October; 3 October |
| Prime round | Quarter-finals | 11 November (First leg); 15 November (Second leg) |
| Prime round | Semi-finals | 24 March (First leg); 28 March (Second leg) |
| Prime round | Final | 8 May |

== First round ==
=== Group 1 ===
Round 1
2 September – Hachinohe
Vanraure Hachinohe | 0
Tochigi City | 2
9 September – Matsumoto
Matsumoto Yamaga (p) | 3 (4)
Shonan Bellmare | 3 (3)
2 September – Maebashi
Thespa Gunma | 1
Albirex Niigata | 2
2 September – Kanazawa
Zweigen Kanazawa | 2
FC Imabari | 1
9 September – Utsunomiya
Tochigi SC | 0
Montedio Yamagata | 1

Round 2
29 September – Tochigi
Tochigi City | 0
Sanfrecce Hiroshima | 2
29 September – Matsumoto
Matsumoto Yamaga | 1
Albirex Niigata | 0
29 September – Kanazawa
Zweigen Kanazawa | 0
Shimizu S-Pulse | 2
29 September – Tendō
Montedio Yamagata | 1
Yokohama F. Marinos | 2

Round 3
14 October – Matsumoto
Matsumoto Yamaga | 0
Sanfrecce Hiroshima | 1
14 October – Yokohama
Yokohama F. Marinos | 2
Shimizu S-Pulse | 1

Round 4
28 October – Yokohama
Sanfrecce Hiroshima | 3
Yokohama F. Marinos | 4

| 2 September 2026 Round 1 | Vanraure Hachinohe (2) | 0–2 | (2) Tochigi City | Hachinohe |
| 18:30 | | Report | Vásquez 11'; Nguen 88' | Stadium: Prifoods Stadium; Attendance: 923; Referee: Ryosuke Yamaoka |

| 9 September 2026 Round 1 | Matsumoto Yamaga (3) | 3–3 (a.e.t.) (4–3 p) | (2) Shonan Bellmare | Matsumoto |
| 19:00 | Shibuya 21'; Sato 48'; Kaneko 86' | Report | Matsumura 45+1'; Okuno 85', 89' | Stadium: Sunpro Alwin; Attendance: 2,282; Referee: Tomoaki Kitazawa |
| | Penalties |
| | Kaneko (penalty scored); Taguchi (penalty scored); Inoue (penalty scored); Sawazaki (penalty scored) | | (penalty scored) Okuno; (penalty missed) Shimoguchi; (penalty scored) Tachi; (penalty scored) Ikeda; (penalty missed) Fukazawa |

| 2 September 2026 Round 1 | Thespa Gunma (3) | 1–2 | (2) Albirex Niigata | Maebashi |
| 19:03 | Tamashiro 40' | Report | Maeda 36'; Kasai 50' | Stadium: Shoda Shoyu Stadium Gunma; Attendance: 1,874; Referee: Shingo Kuniyoshi |

| 2 September 2026 Round 1 | Zweigen Kanazawa (3) | 2–1 | (2) FC Imabari | Kanazawa |
| 19:03 | Sugiura 29'; Patric 89' | Report | Kikuchi 72' | Stadium: Ishikawa Athletics Stadium; Attendance: 1,481; Referee: Yuki Tanabe |

| 9 September 2026 Round 1 | Tochigi SC (2) | 0–1 | (3) Montedio Yamagata | Utsunomiya |
| 19:03 | | Report | Mori 17' | Stadium: kanseki Stadium Tochigi; Attendance: 1,696; Referee: Yuki Tanabe |

| 29 September 2026 Round 2 | Tochigi City (2) | 0–2 | (1) Sanfrecce Hiroshima | Tochigi |
| 19:03 | | Report | Ayukawa 13'; Kato 23' | Stadium: City Football Station; Attendance: 2,260; Referee: Jumpei Iida |

| 29 September 2026 Round 2 | Matsumoto Yamaga (3) | 1–0 | (2) Albirex Niigata | Matsumoto |
| 19:03 | Takano 20' | Report | | Stadium: Sunpro Alwin; Attendance: 3,089; Referee: Genki Tawara |

| 29 September 2026 Round 2 | Zweigen Kanazawa (3) | 0–2 | (1) Shimizu S-Pulse | Kanazawa |
| 19:04 | | Report | Matsuzaki 60'; Kitagawa 88' | Stadium: Kanazawa Go Go Curry Stadium; Attendance: 2,851; Referee: Yoshito Nakagawa |

| 29 September 2026 Round 2 | Montedio Yamagata (2) | 1–2 | (1) Yokohama F. Marinos | Tendō |
| 19:03 | Horikane 90+1' | Report | Nitta 43'; Matsumura 65' | Stadium: NDsoft Stadium Yamagata; Attendance: 5,065; Referee: Hayato Shimizu |

| 14 October 2026 Round 3 | Matsumoto Yamaga (3) | 0–1 | (1) Sanfrecce Hiroshima | Matsumoto |
| 19:03 | | Report | Kobayashi 20' | Stadium: Sunpro Alwin; Attendance: 4,757; Referee: Takuya Kobayashi |

| 14 October 2026 Round 3 | Yokohama F.Marinos (1) | 2–1 | (1) Shimizu S-Pulse | Yokohama |
| 19:03 | Tanimura 72'; Chinen 81' | Report | Fujii 61' | Stadium: Nissan Stadium; Attendance: 8,879; Referee: Takafumi Mikuriya |

| 28 October 2026 Round 4 | Yokohama F.Marinos (1) | 4–3 | (1) Sanfrecce Hiroshima | Yokohama |
| 19:03 | Nitta 53'; Hirano 59'; Onaiwu 75'; Kim Ju-sung 90+4' (o.g.) | Report | Araki 66'; Arai 74', 81' | Stadium: NHK Spring Mitsuzawa Football Stadium; Attendance: 9,055; Referee: Akihiko Ikeuchi |

=== Group 2 ===
Round 1
2 September – Shintomi
Tegevajaro Miyazaki | 1
Kataller Toyama | 2
2 September – Okinawa
FC Ryukyu | 2
Yokohama FC | 3
2 September – Gifu
FC Gifu (p) | 0 (3)
Tokushima Vortis | 0 (1)
2 September – Kagoshima
Kagoshima United | 0
Hokkaido Consadole Sapporo | 1
2 September – Kitakyushu
Giravanz Kitakyushu | 1
Iwaki FC | 0

Round 2
29 September – Toyama
Kataller Toyama | 2
Urawa Red Diamonds | 3
29 September – Gifu
FC Gifu | 1
Yokohama FC | 2
29 September – Sapporo
Consadole Sapporo | 1
Fagiano Okayama | 2
29 September – Kitakyushu
Giravanz Kitakyushu | 1
Nagoya Grampus | 3

Round 3
14 October – Yokohama
Yokohama FC | 0
Urawa Red Diamonds | 4
14 October – Gifu
Nagoya Grampus (p) | 3 (4)
Fagiano Okayama | 3 (3)

Round 4
28 October – Gifu
Urawa Red Diamonds (a.e.t.) | 2
Nagoya Grampus | 1

| 2 September 2026 Round 1 | Tegevajaro Miyazaki (2) | 1–2 | (2) Kataller Toyama | Shintomi |
| 19:03 | Kobayashi 7' | Report | Nakashima 21'; Yoshihira 67' | Stadium: Ichigo Miyazaki Shintomi Football Stadium; Attendance: 1,181; Referee: Yoshikazu Matsuzawa |

| 2 September 2026 Round 1 | FC Ryukyu (3) | 2–3 | (2) Yokohama FC | Okinawa |
| 19:03 | Sota 44'; Motegi 49' | Report | João Paulo 1'; Adaílton 29'; Ito 85' | Stadium: Okinawa Athletic Park Stadium; Attendance: 842; Referee: Ryo Munakata |

| 2 September 2026 Round 1 | FC Gifu (3) | 0–0 (a.e.t.) (3–1 p) | (2) Tokushima Vortis | Gifu |
| 19:03 | | Report | | Stadium: Gifu Nagaragawa Stadium; Attendance: 1,607; Referee: Ryu Mashio |
| | Penalties |
| | Kanda (penalty scored); Yakabi (penalty missed); Haneda (penalty scored); Kitajima (penalty missed); Izumisawa (penalty scored) | | (penalty missed) Kajiya; (penalty scored) Sugimoto; (penalty missed) Kanuma; (penalty missed) Yamada |

| 2 September 2026 Round 1 | Kagoshima United (2) | 0–1 | (2) Consadole Sapporo | Kagoshima |
| 19:03 | | Report | Hasegawa 89' | Stadium: Shiranami Stadium; Attendance: 3,713; Referee: Takuya Kobayashi |

| 2 September 2026 Round 1 | Giravanz Kitakyushu (3) | 1–0 | (2) Iwaki FC | Kitakyushu |
| 19:03 | Yoshinaga 83' | Report | | Stadium: Mikuni World Stadium Kitakyushu; Attendance: 1,989; Referee: Shinya Sasaki |

| 29 September 2026 Round 2 | Kataller Toyama (2) | 2–3 | (1) Urawa Reds | Toyama |
| 19:03 | Mizoguchi 62'; Matsuda 69' | Report | Kaneko 39'; Komori 72'; Hidano 83' | Stadium: Toyama Stadium; Attendance: 8,209; Referee: Atsushi Kamimura |

| 29 September 2026 Round 2 | FC Gifu (3) | 1–2 | (2) Yokohama FC | Gifu |
| 19:03 | Yakabi 25' | Report | Uda 55'; João Paulo 90+3' | Stadium: Gifu Nagaragawa Stadium; Attendance: 1,468; Referee: Toshihiro Nakai |

| 29 September 2026 Round 2 | Consadole Sapporo (2) | 1–2 | (1) Fagiano Okayama | Sapporo |
| 19:03 | Bakayoko 58' | Report | Kawano 36'; Suzuki 90+3' | Stadium: Daiwa House Premist Dome; Attendance: 4,138; Referee: Hiroyuki Kimura |

| 29 September 2026 Round 2 | Giravanz Kitakyushu (3) | 1–3 | (1) Nagoya Grampus | Kitakyushu |
| 19:03 | Yoshida 90' | Report | Uchida 19'; Yamagishi 30'; Kimura 68' | Stadium: Mikuni World Stadium Kitakyushu; Attendance: 3,704; Referee: Koichiro Fukushima |

| 14 October 2026 Round 3 | Yokohama FC (2) | 0–4 | (1) Urawa Reds | Yokohama |
| 18:33 | | Report | Hidano 7'; Sasa 13'; Komori 36'; Naganuma 90' | Stadium: NHK Spring Mitsuzawa Football Stadium; Attendance: 5,338; Referee: Futoshi Nakamura |

| 14 October 2026 Round 3 | Nagoya Grampus (1) | 3–3 (a.e.t.) (4–3 p) | (1) Fagiano Okayama | Gifu |
| 19:03 | Koda 32', 46'; Ono 69' | Report | Ikedo 29'; Fujii 50'; Léo Gaúcho 88' | Stadium: Gifu Nagaragawa Stadium; Attendance: 4,410; Referee: Koei Koya |
| | Penalties |
| | Takamine (penalty scored); Kimura (penalty scored); Sugiura (penalty scored); Koda (penalty scored); Koyamatsu (penalty missed) | | (penalty scored) Motoyama; (penalty scored) Esaka; (penalty scored) Miyamoto; (penalty missed) Oberdan; (penalty missed) Léo Gaúcho |

| 28 October 2026 Round 4 | Nagoya Grampus (1) | 1–2 (a.e.t.) | (1) Urawa Reds | Gifu |
| 19:03 | Yamagishi 66' | Report | Hayakawa 45+2'; Minamino 117' | Stadium: Gifu Nagaragawa Stadium; Attendance: 7,492; Referee: Koichiro Fukushima |

=== Group 3 ===
Round 1
2 September – Kumamoto
Roasso Kumamoto | 2
Oita Trinita | 0
9 September – Marugame
Kamatamare Sanuki | 0
JEF United Chiba | 2
2 September – Sagamihara
SC Sagamihara | 0
Júbilo Iwata | 2
2 September – Kyoto
FC Osaka | 3
Ventforet Kofu | 0
9 September – Hikone
Reilac Shiga | 0
Tokyo Verdy | 1
2 September – Nara
Nara Club | 1
Sagan Tosu | 2

Round 2
29 September – Kumamoto
Roasso Kumamoto | 0
Kawasaki Frontale | 1
29 September – Iwata
Júbilo Iwata | 4
JEF United Chiba | 2
29 September – Yamaguchi
FC Osaka | 1
Avispa Fukuoka (a.e.t.) | 2
29 September – Tosu
Sagan Tosu (a.e.t.) | 2
Tokyo Verdy | 1

Round 3
14 October – Iwata
Júbilo Iwata | 0
Kawasaki Frontale | 4
14 October – Tosu
Sagan Tosu | 2
Avispa Fukuoka | 1

Round 4
28 October - Tosu
Kawasaki Frontale | 2
Sagan Tosu | 0

| 2 September 2026 Round 1 | Roasso Kumamoto (3) | 2–0 | (2) Oita Trinita | Kumamoto |
| 19:03 | Katori 38'; Nagai 56' | Report | | Stadium: Egao Kenko Stadium; Attendance: 2,436; Referee: Fumiya Honda |

| 9 September 2026 Round 1 | Kamatamare Sanuki (3) | 0–2 | (1) JEF United Chiba | Marugame |
| 19:03 | | Report | Erison 18'; Shinada 67' | Stadium: Shikoku Kasei Meglio Stadium; Attendance: 1,134; Referee: Yoshito Nakagawa |

| 2 September 2026 Round 1 | SC Sagamihara (3) | 0–3 | (2) Júbilo Iwata | Sagamihara |
| 18:33 | | Report | Watanabe 35'; Yamazaki 39'; Kawasaki 45+3' | Stadium: Sagamihara Gion Stadium; Attendance: 2,297; Referee: Yosuke Kubota |

| 2 September 2026 Round 1 | FC Osaka (3) | 3–0 | (2) Ventforet Kofu | Kyoto |
| 19:03 | Nagano 06'; Kitsui 67'; Fukui 69' | Report | | Stadium: Takebishi Stadium Kyoto; Attendance: 627; Referee: Kai Oto |

| 9 September 2026 Round 1 | Reilac Shiga (3) | 0–1 | (1) Tokyo Verdy | Hikone |
| 18:33 | | Report | Kim Hyun-woo 90+5' | Stadium: Heiwado HATO Stadium; Attendance: 2,885; Referee: Yuzo Sutani |

| 2 September 2026 Round 1 | Nara Club (3) | 1–2 | (2) Sagan Tosu | Nara |
| 19:03 | Tomizu 12' | Report | Park Ho-min 30'; Jojo 72' | Stadium: Rohto Field Nara; Attendance: 822; Referee: Kohei Yano |

| 29 September 2026 Round 2 | Roasso Kumamoto (3) | 0–1 | (1) Kawasaki Frontale | Kumamoto |
| 19:03 | | Report | Uremović 58' | Stadium: Egao Kenko Stadium; Attendance: 6,682; Referee: Koei Koya |

| 29 September 2026 Round 2 | Júbilo Iwata (2) | 4–2 | (1) JEF United Chiba | Iwata |
| 19:03 | Nishikubo 6'; Peixoto 23', 66'; Koike 85' | Report | Sugiyama 42'; Ishikawa 46' | Stadium: Yamaha Stadium; Attendance: 2,892; Referee: Takafumi Mikuriya |

| 29 September 2026 Round 2 | FC Osaka (3) | 1–2 (a.e.t.) | (1) Avispa Fukuoka | Yamaguchi |
| 19:03 | Nagano 90+6' | Report | Maeda 84'; Kamijima 105+1' | Stadium: Ishin Me-Life Stadium; Attendance: 1,002; Referee: Keigo Sendachi |

| 29 September 2026 Round 2 | Sagan Tosu (2) | 2–1 (a.e.t.) | (1) Tokyo Verdy | Tosu |
| 19:03 | Shiohama 52', 107' | Report | Fujimoto 60' | Stadium: Ekimae Real Estate Stadium; Attendance: 2,658; Referee: Masuya Ueda |

| 14 October 2026 Round 3 | Jubilo Iwata (2) | 0–4 | (1) Kawasaki Frontale | Iwata |
| 19:03 | | Report | Maruyama 17'; Kawahara 50'; Romano 72'; Yamaichi 84' | Stadium: Yamaha Stadium; Attendance: 4,656; Referee: Koichiro Fukushima |

| 14 October 2026 Round 3 | Sagan Tosu (2) | 2–1 | (1) Avispa Fukuoka | Tosu |
| 19:03 | Yoshino 32'; Yamauchi 71' | Report | Hashimoto 37' | Stadium: Ekimae Real Estate Stadium; Attendance: 10,147; Referee: Hayato Shimizu |

| 28 October 2026 Round 4 | Sagan Tosu (2) | 0–2 | (1) Kawasaki Frontale | Tosu |
| 19:03 | | Report | Yamaichi 65'; Marcinho 86' | Stadium: Ekimae Real Estate Stadium; Attendance: 5,366; Referee: Takuya Kobayashi |

=== Group 4 ===
Round 1
2 September – Yamaguchi
Renofa Yamaguchi | 0
Fujieda MYFC | 2
9 September – Haruno
Kochi United | 0
V-Varen Nagasaki | 1
2 September – Tottori
Gainare Tottori | 3
RB Omiya Ardija | 1
2 September – Matsuyama
Ehime FC | 1
Blaublitz Akita | 0
9 September – Nagano
AC Nagano Parceiro | 0 (1)
Mito HollyHock (p) | 0 (4)
9 September – Fukushima
Fukushima United | 4
Vegalta Sendai | 3

Round 2
29 September – Fujieda
Fujieda MYFC | 1
Cerezo Osaka | 2
29 September – Tottori
Gainare Tottori | 2
V-Varen Nagasaki | 0
29 September – Matsuyama
Ehime FC | 0
FC Tokyo | 2
29 September – Fukushima
Fukushima United | 0
Mito HollyHock | 7

Round 3
14 October – Tottori
Gainare Tottori | 2
Cerezo Osaka | 3
14 October – Mito
Mito HollyHock | 1
FC Tokyo | 0

Round 4
28 October - Mito
Cerezo Osaka | 3
Mito HollyHock | 1

| 2 September 2026 Round 1 | Renofa Yamaguchi (3) | 0–2 | (2) Fujieda MYFC | Yamaguchi |
| 19:03 | | Report | Manabe 70', 79' | Stadium: Ishin Me-Life Stadium; Attendance: 2,308; Referee: Hirokazu Otsubo |

| 9 September 2026 Round 1 | Kochi United (3) | 0–1 | (1) V-Varen Nagasaki | Haruno |
| 19:03 | | Report | Pituca 77' | Stadium: GIKEN Stadium; Attendance: 1,358; Referee: Takuya Kobayashi |

| 2 September 2026 Round 1 | Gainare Tottori (3) | 3–1 | (2) RB Omiya Ardija | Tottori |
| 19:04 | Fujita 2'; Yamamoto 45', 57' | Report | Kobayashi 69' | Stadium: Axis Bird Stadium; Attendance: 1,241; Referee: Tatsuya Sakai |

| 2 September 2026 Round 1 | Ehime FC (3) | 1–0 | (2) Blaublitz Akita | Matsuyama |
| 19:03 | Hayashi 10' | Report | | Stadium: Ningineer Stadium; Attendance: 2,060; Referee: Michiaki Kitazawa |

| 9 September 2026 Round 1 | AC Nagano Parceiro (3) | 0–0 (a.e.t.) (1–4 p) | (1) Mito HollyHock | Nagano |
| 19:03 | | Report | | Stadium: Nagano U Stadium; Attendance: 1,922; Referee: Takahito Seta |
| | Penalties |
| | Fujikawa (penalty missed); Watanabe (penalty scored); Morita (penalty missed) | | (penalty scored) Nemoto; (penalty scored) Tada; (penalty scored) Shimatani; (penalty scored) Ieizumi |

| 9 September 2026 Round 1 | Fukushima United (3) | 4–3 | (2) Vegalta Sendai | Fukushima |
| 19:03 | Nakamura 39'; Kudo 49' (o.g.); Shimizu 67'; Okada 70' | Report | Kamada 61', 90+2'; Inoue 88' | Stadium: Toho Stadium; Attendance: 2,262; Referee: Tomohiro Inoue |

| 29 September 2026 Round 2 | Fujieda MYFC (2) | 1–2 | (1) Cerezo Osaka | Fujieda |
| 19:03 | Kawamoto 51' | | Sabbag 34'; Lucas Fernandes 54' | Stadium: Fujieda Soccer Stadium; Attendance: 2,024; Referee: Takahito Seta |

| 29 September 2026 Round 2 | Gainare Tottori (3) | 2–0 | (1) V-Varen Nagasaki | Tottori |
| 19:03 | Shinoda 53'; Yamamoto 86' | Report | | Stadium: Axis Bird Stadium; Attendance: 1,255; Referee: Yuzo Sutani |

| 29 September 2026 Round 2 | Ehime FC (3) | 0–2 | (1) FC Tokyo | Matsuyama |
| 19:03 | | Report | Satō 15'; Nagakura 59' | Stadium: Ningineer Stadium; Attendance: 3,529; Referee: Akihiko Ikeuchi |

| 29 September 2026 Round 2 | Fukushima United FC (3) | 0–7 | (1) Mito HollyHock | Fukushima |
| 19:03 | | Report | Ieizumi 6'; Kato 10', 14'; Itakura 39'; Nemoto 45+1'; Okumura 65'; Torikai 76' | Stadium: Toho Stadium; Attendance: 1,011; Referee: Futoshi Nakamura |

| 14 October 2026 Round 3 | Gainare Tottori (3) | 2–3 | (1) Cerezo Osaka | Tottori |
| 19:03 | Konishi 31', 47' | Report | Uejō 11'; Sabbag 37'; Lucas Fernandes 89' | Stadium: Axis Bird Stadium; Attendance: 3,693; Referee: Yoshito Nakagawa |

| 14 October 2026 Round 3 | Mito HollyHock (1) | 1–0 | (1) FC Tokyo | Mito |
| 19:03 | Yamashita 51' | Report | | Stadium: K's denki Stadium Mito; Attendance: 3,163; Referee: Masuya Ueda |

| 28 October 2026 Round 4 | Mito HollyHock (1) | 1–3 | (1) Cerezo Osaka | Naka |
| 19:03 | Patryck 46' | Report | Nakamura 2'; Sakuragawa 56', 71' | Stadium: Mito Shinkin Bank Stadium; Attendance: 2,685; Referee: Koji Takasaki |

=== Group 5 ===
Round 1

Round 2

Round 3

Round 4
3 October – Machida
Machida Zelvia (p) | 0 (5)
Kyoto Sanga | 0 (3)

| 3 October 2026 Round 4 | Machida Zelvia (1) | 0–0 (a.e.t.) (5–3 p) | (1) Kyoto Sanga | Machida |
| 16:00 | | Report | | Stadium: Machida GION Stadium; Attendance: 4,437; Referee: Futoshi Nakamura |
| | Penalties |
| | Drešević (penalty scored); Shimoda (penalty scored); Tani (penalty scored); Ouwejan (penalty scored); Shirasaki (penalty scored) | | (penalty scored) Marco Túlio; (penalty missed) Yoon Sung-jun; (penalty scored) Arai; (penalty scored) Sato |

=== Group 6 ===
Round 1

Round 2

Round 3

Round 4
3 October – Kashiwa
Kashiwa Reysol (a.e.t.) | 5
Gamba Osaka | 4

| 3 October 2026 Round 4 | Kashiwa Reysol (1) | 5–4 (a.e.t.) | (1) Gamba Osaka | Kashiwa |
| 19:03 | Fujio 28', 59'; Segawa 90+3'; Yuba 103', 109' | Report | Jebali 45+3', 89'; Welton 73'; Sasaki 108' | Stadium: Sankyo Frontier Kashiwa Stadium; Attendance: 10,518; Referee: Hayato Shimizu |

== Prime round ==
The draw for the prime round took place on 29 October 2026.

=== Bracket ===
Quarter-finals
Machida Zelvia | 1 | 1 | 2
Vissel Kobe | 0 | 1 | 1
Cerezo Osaka | 0 | 1 | 1
Urawa Red Diamonds | 2 | 1 | 3
Kashima Antlers | 3 | 3 | 6
Yokohama F. Marinos | 2 | 2 | 4
Kashiwa Reysol | 2 | 5 | 7
Kawasaki Frontale | 1 | 4 | 5

Semi-finals
Machida Zelvia
Urawa Red Diamonds
Kashima Antlers
Kashiwa Reysol

Final
8 May – Tokyo

=== Quarter-finals ===
The six play-off round winners were joined by J1 100 Year Vision League champions Vissel Kobe and 2025 J1 League champions Kashima Antlers, as the top-seeded 2026–27 AFC Champions League Elite participants.

| 11 November 2026 Leg 1 | Vissel Kobe | 0–1 | FC Machida Zelvia | Kobe |
| 19:03 | | Report | Duke 85' | Stadium: Noevir Stadium Kobe; Attendance: 5,695; Referee: Koichiro Fukushima |

| 15 November 2026 Leg 2 | FC Machida Zelvia | 1–1 | Vissel Kobe | Machida |
| 14:03 | Mikuni 81' | Report | Komatsu 85' | Stadium: Machida GION Stadium; Attendance: 3,803; Referee: Futoshi Nakamura |

| 11 November 2026 Leg 1 | Urawa Red Diamonds | 2–0 | Cerezo Osaka | Saitama |
| 19:33 | Ueki 74'; Komori 90+4' | Report | | Stadium: Saitama Stadium 2002; Attendance: 10,004; Referee: Jumpei Iida |

| 15 November 2026 Leg 2 | Cerezo Osaka | 1–1 | Urawa Reds | Osaka |
| 15:03 | Sakuragawa 72' | Report | Hayashi 59' | Stadium: Yanmar Hanasaka Stadium; Attendance: 8,863; Referee: Masuya Ueda |

| 11 November 2026 Leg 1 | Yokohama F. Marinos | 2–3 | Kashima Antlers | Yokohama |
| 19:03 | Nitta 20' (pen.); Miyaichi 25' | Report | Suzuki 45+6', 82'; Shibasaki 65' | Stadium: Nissan Stadium; Attendance: 11,593; Referee: Koei Koya |

| 15 November 2026 Leg 2 | Kashima Antlers | 3–2 | Yokohama F.Marinos | Ibaraki |
| 15:03 | Matsumura 2'; Ueda 56'; Čavrić 90+4' | Report | Amano 47'; Nitta 86' | Stadium: Mercari Stadium; Attendance: 13,813; Referee: Jumpei Iida |

| 11 November 2026 Leg 1 | Kawasaki Frontale | 1–2 | Kashiwa Reysol | Kawasaki |
| 19:03 | Itō 47' | Report | Mitsumaru 84'; Kubo 87' | Stadium: Uvance Todoroki Stadium by Fujitsu; Attendance: 11,072; Referee: Akihiko Ikeuchi |

| 15 November 2026 Leg 2 | Kashiwa Reysol | 5–4 | Kawasaki Frontale | Kashiwa |
| 17:03 | Kubo 45+2', 64'; Fujio 54'; Yamauchi 60'; Segawa 72' | Report | Taniguchi 9'; Itō 25'; Wakizaka 30'; Yamaichi 81' | Stadium: Sankyo Frontier Kashiwa Stadium; Attendance: 9,189; Referee: Atsushi Kamimura |

=== Semi-finals ===
| 24 March 2027 Leg 1 | Urawa Reds | v | FC Machida Zelvia | Saitama |
| 19:00 | | | | Stadium: Saitama Stadium 2002 |

| 28 March 2027 Leg 2 | FC Machida Zelvia | v | Urawa Reds | Machida |
| 14:00 | | | | Stadium: Machida GION Stadium |

| 24 March 2027 Leg 1 | Kashiwa Reysol | v | Kashima Antlers | Kashiwa |
| 19:00 | | | | Stadium: Sankyo Frontier Kashiwa Stadium |

| 28 March 2027 Leg 2 | Kashima Antlers | v | Kashiwa Reysol | Ibaraki |
| 15:00 | | | | Stadium: Mercari Stadium |

== Top scorers ==
As of 15 November 2026

| Rank | Player | Club | Goals |
|---|---|---|---|
| 1 | (Japan) Rio Nitta | Yokohama F. Marinos | 4 |
| 2 | (Japan) Hiiro Komori | Urawa Red Diamonds | 3 |
| 2 | (Japan) Tojiro Kubo | Kashiwa Reysol | 3 |
| 2 | (Japan) Shota Fujio | Kashiwa Reysol | 3 |
| 2 | (Japan) Shuto Yamaichi | Kawasaki Frontale | 3 |
| 2 | (Japan) Solomon Sakuragawa | Cerezo Osaka | 3 |
| 2 | (Japan) Sota Yamamoto | Gainare Tottori | 3 |

== See also ==
- 2026–27 Emperor's Cup
- 2026–27 J1 League
- 2026–27 J2 League
- 2026–27 J3 League
- 2026–27 Japan Football League
- 2026 Japanese Regional Leagues
