= List of J.League mascots =

The following is a list of mascots of J. League (Japan Professional Football League) teams:

J1 League (2024)
Team	Image	Mascot(s)	Description
Albirex Niigata		Albi-kun, his wife Swan-chan, their triplets; A-kun, Lu-chan, and Bi-kun	A family of swans. Based on the name of the team; Albireo is a star from constellation Cygnus (the swan) and the Latin word Rex mean king. Albi-kun and Swan-chan both wear a hat resembling a crown. Only Bi-kun is a black swan.
Avispa Fukuoka		Avi and Vivi	A pair of bees. Vivi was introduced later in 2000 and they got married in 2003.
Cerezo Osaka		Lobby and Madame Lobina	Two anthropomorphic wolves; they are came from Spain and Madame Lobina is Lobby's mother. Lobby is the primary character.
FC Machida Zelvia		Zelvy-kun	A crested kingfisher.
FC Tokyo		Tokyo Dorompa	An anthropomorphic tanuki. According to the team profile, he was born on October 1, 1998, in Tokyo's Minato Ward and has a tendency to appear and disappear quickly. He was officially introduced to the public in January 2009.
Gamba Osaka		Gamba Boy	A boy who wears a white toga and blue cape, occasionally he also holds a lightning. Have a belt with letter P on its buckle. Today, he primarily wears Gamba Osaka's kit.
Hokkaido Consadole Sapporo		Dole-kun	An anthropomorphic Blakiston's fish owl; this mascot is based on the largest owl species in Japan.
Jubilo Iwata		Jubi-kun	An anthropomorphic black-tailed flycatcher, the national bird of Shizuoka Prefecture.
Kashima Antlers		Shikao, Shikako, and Anton	Three deer-like figures, derived of the city's name and shrine.
Kashiwa Reysol		Rey-kun	Young king of sun.
Kawasaki Frontale		Fron-ta and Warun-ta	Two dolphin-like figures.
Kyoto Sanga FC		Pursa-kun and Kotono-chan	A pair of phoenixes. Their main color is purple instead of red, based on the main color of the club.
Nagoya Grampus		Grampus-kun, Grara, Grampus-kun Jr., and Grampako-chan	Four orca-like figures. Grara has a red-and-white color scheme; Grampus-kun, Grampus-kun Jr., and Grampako-chan have a black-and-white color scheme. Of these four mascots, Grampus-kun is the primary character.
Urawa Red Diamonds		Redia, Friendia, Schale, and Diarra	Four green wolf-like figures. According to the club profile, Schale and Diarra are twins who were born on the day when the team won its first J. League championship.
Sagan Tosu		Wintosu	A European magpie, the official bird of Saga Prefecture. His color are light blue and pink, the primary colors of the club. He is also wearing a pink headband.
Sanfrecce Hiroshima		Sancce and Frecce	A pair of anthropomorphic bears.
Shonan Bellmare		King Bell I	The design based on Poseidon with his trident.
Tokyo Verdy		Reverun	A birdlike mascot, introduced in 2020; it replaced Verdy-kun, a condor-like figure, which became "honorary mascot".
Vissel Kobe		Movi	An anthropomorphic cow with an admiral's hat (before Crimson Group's takeover of Vissel Kobe, she had a Viking helmet).
Yokohama F. Marinos		Marinos-kun, Marinosuke and Marin	Three anthropomorphic seagulls. Marinosuke is Marinos's nephew and Marin is Marinos-kun’s and Marinosuke’s girlfriend and wears a red bow.
J2 League (2024)
Team	Image	Mascot(s)	Description
Blaublitz Akita		Blaugon	An eigh-year-old dragon. He was born in Lake Tazawa and wears #00.
Ehime F.C.		Ore-kun, Iyokanta, and Tamahime-chan	Three anthropomorphic oranges. Of this three mascots, Ore-kun is the primary character.
Fagiano Okayama		Fagi-maru	A green pheasant. Fagiano in Italian mean "pheasant".
FC Ryukyu		Jinbe-nho	A whale shark.
Fujieda MYFC		Kettobashikozo	A male bird of sorts, his name also means "kicking boy".
Iwaki FC		Dori	A Futabasaurus dinosaur whose origin story was that it woke up after an 85 million year sleep. The smaller dinosaur on its head is named Harma.
JEF United Chiba		Jeffy and Unity	Two Akita dog-like figures.
Kagoshima United FC		Uniku	A breed of dog local to Kagoshima, but also looks like a cat, as he is "Yuniaku" (which is unique in Japanese).
Mito HollyHock		Holly-kun	An anthropomorphic little Chinese dragon.
Montedio Yamagata		Montes, Dio	Montes is the god of mountain. Dio is the god of war, mountain deer-shaped. According to his backstory, he is officially 167cm tall, but as he is a god, he can be as tall as he likes. His favorite player is Diego Maradona.
Oita Trinita		Neetan	An anthropomorphic turtle with a blue and green colour scheme. Neetan's shell is segmented in the shape of a soccer ball, and his cleats have the same design. The club's "T" logo appears on his chest, and a map of Oita Prefecture on his back. He also has little yellow wings popping out of his carapace, and winged designs by his ears.
Renofa Yamaguchi FC		Reno-maru	A lion.
Roasso Kumamoto		Roasso-kun	A horse, referencing Kumamoto being well known for racing horses. Occasionally, the club also uses Kumamon, the mascot of Kumamoto Prefecture.
Shimizu S-Pulse		Pul, Co-Pul (small shaped sidekick), Pical	An anthropomorphic rabbit whose ears resemble wings; according to the team profile, they are designed to symbolize "S-Pulse players flying quickly in the field." The mascot's name is based on the English word "pal." Pical is Pul-chan's grlfriend.
Thespakusatsu Gunma		Yuto	The design based on traditional Japanese lion dance figure and a little boy. His shirt number is 932, that could be read as Kusatsu in Japanese.
Tochigi S.C.		Tokky	An anthropomorphic Japanese macaque.
Tokushima Vortis		Vorta-kun and Tis-chan	A pair of tanukis.
Vegalta Sendai		Vegatta	An anthropomorphic golden eagle.
Ventforet Kofu		Vent-kun and Foret-chan	A pair of anthropomorphic Kai Ken dogs.
V-Varen Nagasaki		Vivi-kun "V.V"	A sort of cartoon mouse, similar to the design of Pixie and Dixie wearing a V-Varen Nagasaki kit and a headwear that appears to be the club's and Nagasaki Prefecture's official bird the Mandarin Duck with blue deer antlers.
Yokohama FC		Fulie-maru	A bird alien-like figure.
J3 League (2024)
Team	Image	Mascot(s)	Description
AC Nagano Parceiro		Liaoh, Paruru and Raito	A trio of lions.
Iwate Grulla Morioka		Kizuru	An anthropomorphic origami crane (orizuru) chosen in a voting.
Fukushima United FC		Fukushima Hinosuke	A phoenix with a headband, a jacket vest, and a katana.
Gainare Tottori		Gainaman	A superhero created by Takami Akai a character designer from Yonago, Tottori.
Giravanz Kitakyushu		Giran	A Saunders's gull. He is wearing a yellow headband and has an anchor tattoo on his right wing. Was known as Wavy before the team changed its name.
Kamatamare Sanuki		Sanupi	A person with a bowl of udon ramen on his head.
Kataller Toyama		Raika-kun	The design is a combination of rock ptarmigan and Japanese serow. This mascot was created based on the mascots of two football clubs that were merged into Kataller Toyama.
Matsumoto Yamaga FC		Gans-kun	A rock ptarmigan, a bird that is a symbol of Nagano Prefecture.
Omiya Ardija		Ardy, Miya	A squirrel couple.
SC Sagamihara		Gamity	An ostrich.
Vanraure Hachinohe		Vanta	A squid.
YSCC Yokohama		Hamapy	Described by J.League International as "a Yokohama local through and through" with a boat on his head, symbolizing Yokohama being a prominent port city, with seagull wings on its back.
Zweigen Kanazawa		Genzo	A sea eagle.
Defunct Teams
Team	Image	Mascot(s)	Description
Yokohama Flugels		Tobimaru	An anthropomorphic flying squirrel wearing a winged aviator helmet with goggles and Flugels' uniform.
