= Tetsuro Miura =

Japanese footballer and manager (1956–2018)

Tetsuro Miura 三浦 哲郎
Personal information
- Full name: Tetsuro Miura
- Date of birth: April 12, 1956
- Place of birth: Shizuoka, Japan
- Date of death: April 28, 2018 (aged 62)
- Place of death: Toyota, Aichi, Japan

Managerial career
- Years: Team
- 1994: Nagoya Grampus Eight
- 2001: Nagoya Grampus Eight

Tetsuro Miura (三浦 哲郎, Miura Tetsurō; April 12, 1956 – April 28, 2018) was a Japanese football player and manager.

== Coaching career ==
Miura was born in Shizuoka Prefecture on April 12, 1956. In 1992, he became a coach at Nagoya Grampus Eight. In November 1994, manager Gordon Milne resigned and Miura managed last two matches in this season as caretaker. In 1997, he signed with Japan Football League club Kawasaki Frontale and served as a coach. In 1998, he moved to Vissel Kobe and served as a coach. In 1999, he returned to Nagoya Grampus Eight. In July 2001, manager João Carlos was sacked and Miura became a new manager and managed until end of 2001 season.

On April 28, 2018, Miura died of an adenocarcinoma of the lung in Toyota at the age of 62.

== Managerial statistics ==
Team	From	To	Record				
Team	From	To	G	W	D	L	Win %
Nagoya Grampus Eight	1994	1994	2	1	0	1	50.00
Nagoya Grampus Eight	2001	2001	15	7	1	7	46.67
Total			17	8	1	8	47.06
