= Grampus-kun =

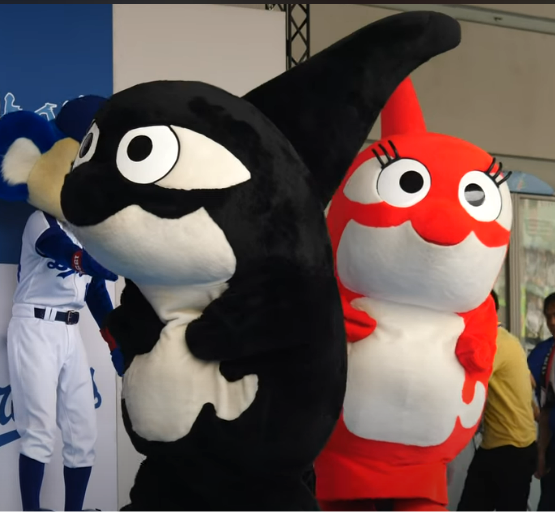

Grampus-kun is a mascot of Nagoya Grampus, a Japanese association football club in the J-League. Grampus-kun is an artificial grampus dolphin. He has a wife, a son and a daughter. He also became friends with Pul, the mascot of Shimizu S-Pulse. They both have even released a book together about them going out for lunch, interviewing each other, introducing themselves, and talking about their home towns.

== Grampus family ==
=== Grampus-kun ===
- body color: black
- height: 188 sm (shachi-meters)
- weight: 88 sg (shachi-grams)
- birthday: October 3
- birthplace: Aichi prefecture (Chuubu area)
- hobbies: watching sports and traveling

=== Grampako-chan ===
- body color: black
- height: 178 sm (shachi-meters)
- weight: 100 sg (shachi-grams)
- birthday: May 14
- relation: wife
- nickname: Pako-chan

=== Grampus-kun Jr. ===
- body color: black
- height: 168 sm (shachi-meters)
- weight: 68 sg (shachi-grams)
- birthday: August 8
- relation: son
- hobbies: mixed martial arts

=== Grara ===
- body color: red
- height: secret
- weight: secret
- birthday: March 22
- relation: daughter
- hobby: dancing
- favorite food: strawberry

== See also ==
- List of J. League mascots
