= Alexandre Pisano =

Japanese footballer

Alexandre Pisano ピサノ・アレックス
Personal information
- Full name: Alexandre Kouto Horio Pisano
- Date of birth: 10 January 2006 (age 20)
- Place of birth: Kasugai, Japan
- Height: 1.97 m (6 ft 6 in)
- Position: Goalkeeper

Team information
- Current team: Nagoya Grampus
- Number: 35

Youth career
- –2017: Ote Elementary School
- 2018–2020: FC Fervor Aichi
- 2021–2023: Nagoya Grampus

Senior career*
| Years | Team | Apps | (Gls) |
| 2024– | Nagoya Grampus | 22 | (0) |

International career^{‡}
| 2023 | Japan U17 | 1 | (0) |
| 2025– | Japan U20 | 2 | (0) |
| 2025– | Japan | 1 | (0) |
| 2026 | Japan U23 | 4 | (0) |
Medal record
Men's football
Representing Japan
Asian Games
| Silver medal – second place | 2026 Aichi–Nagoya |
- * Club domestic league appearances and goals as of 6 September 2026 ‡ National team caps and goals as of 19:26, 30 September 2026 (UTC)

Alexandre Kouto Horio Pisano (ピサノ・アレクサンドレ幸冬堀尾, Pisano Arekusandore Kōto Horio; born 10 January 2006) known as Alex Pisano (Japanese: ピサノ・アレックス), is a Japanese professional footballer who plays as a goalkeeper for Nagoya Grampus and the Japan national team.

== Club career ==
A youth product of FC Fervor Aichi, Pisano joined Nagoya Grampus in 2021 to finish his development. On 16 August 2023, he was promoted to Nagoya's senior team ahead of the 2024 season. He made his senior and professional debut with in a 2–0 J.League Cup win over RB Omiya Ardija on 17 April 2024. On 17 May 2025, he signed his first professional contract with Nagoya.

== International career ==
Pisano was born in Japan to a Canadian father and Japanese mother. He debuted with the Japan U17s in a friendly 2–0 win over the New Zealand U17s on 16 September 2023. He was called up to the Japan U17s for the 2023 FIFA U-17 World Cup. In March 2025, he was called up to the Japan U20s for a set of friendlies.

Pisano was called up to the senior Japan national team for the 2025 EAFF E-1 Football Championship, and debuted in a 6–1 win over Hong Kong on 8 July 2025. At the age of 19 years and 179 days, he was the youngest goalkeeper to debut in the history of the Japanese national team.

On 31 July 2026, it was announced that Pisano would take part in the 2026 Asian Games with the Japan U-21 squad.

== Personal life ==
Pisano's middle name "Kouto" is derived from the kanji from his family's dog and the month of January, when he was born. "Horio" is his Japanese mother's surname. His dad, Michel Leandre Raphael Pisano, is a Canadian from Montreal, Quebec. Therefore, Alex is eligible to represent Canada or Japan at the international level.

== Career statistics ==
=== Club ===
As of match played 6 September 2026

Appearances and goals by club, season and competition
| Club | Season | League | | | Cup | | League Cup | | Other | | Total | |
| Club | Season | Division | Apps | Goals | Apps | Goals | Apps | Goals | Apps | Goals | Apps | Goals |
|---|---|---|---|---|---|---|---|---|---|---|---|---|
| Nagoya Grampus | 2024 | J1 League | 0 | 0 | 0 | 0 | 1 | 0 | — | | 1 | 0 |
| Nagoya Grampus | 2025 | J1 League | 16 | 0 | 2 | 0 | 1 | 0 | — | | 19 | 0 |
| Nagoya Grampus | 2026 | J1 (100) | 0 | 0 | 1 | 0 | 4 | 0 | — | | 5 | 0 |
| Nagoya Grampus | 2026–27 | J1 League | 6 | 0 | 0 | 0 | 0 | 0 | — | | 6 | 0 |
| Career total | | | 22 | 0 | 3 | 0 | 6 | 0 | 0 | 0 | 31 | 0 |

=== International ===
As of match played 8 July 2025

Appearances and goals by national team and year
| National team | Year | Apps | Goals |
|---|---|---|---|
| Japan | 2025 | 1 | 0 |
| Total | | 1 | 0 |

== Honours ==
Nagoya Grampus

- J.League Cup: 2024

Japan

- EAFF Championship: 2025
