= 1996 Japanese Super Cup =

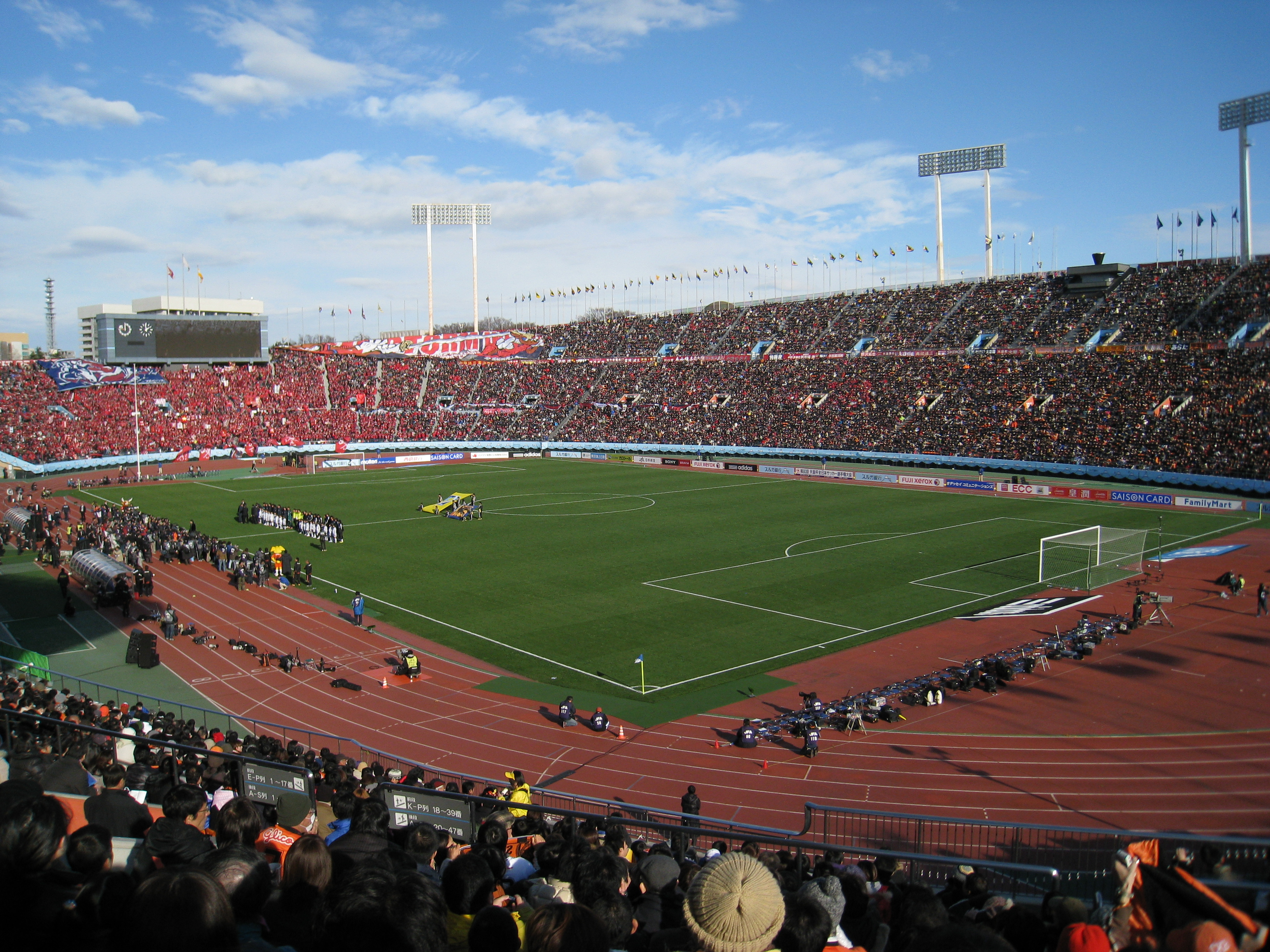
Yokohama Marinos	Nagoya Grampus Eight
0	2
- Date: March 9, 1996
- Venue: National Stadium, Tokyo
- Attendance: 39,570

1996 Japanese Super Cup was the Japanese Super Cup competition. The match was played at National Stadium in Tokyo on March 9, 1996. Nagoya Grampus Eight won the championship.

== Match details ==
March 9, 1996

Yokohama Marinos	0–2	Nagoya Grampus Eight

National Stadium
Attendance: 39,570
