= Rio Nitta =

Japanese footballer (born 2003)

Rio Nitta 二田 理央
Personal information
- Date of birth: 10 April 2003 (age 23)
- Place of birth: Ōita, Japan
- Height: 1.74 m (5 ft 9 in)
- Position: Forward

Team information
- Current team: Yokohama F. Marinos
- Number: 43

Youth career
- Saiki Libero FC
- FC Saiki S-Play Minami
- –2021: Sagan Tosu

Senior career*
Years	Team	Apps	(Gls)
2021–2023	Sagan Tosu	1	(0)
2021–2022	→ Wacker Innsbruck II (loan)	19	(21)
2022	→ Wacker Innsbruck (loan)	5	(1)
2022–2023	→ SKN St. Pölten (loan)	14	(2)
2023–2024	SKN St. Pölten	25	(2)
2024–2026	Urawa Red Diamonds	18	(1)
2025	→ Shonan Bellmare (loan)	13	(1)
2026–	Yokohama F. Marinos	1	(0)

International career^{‡}
2022–2023	Japan U19	3	(0)
- * Club domestic league appearances and goals as of 11 August 2026 ‡ National team caps and goals as of 17:19, 11 January 2024

Rio Nitta (二田 理央, Nitta Rio; born 10 April 2003) is a Japanese professional footballer who plays as a forward for Yokohama F. Marinos.

== Early life ==
Rio was born in Ōita. He played youth football for FC Saiki S-Play Minami and Sagan Tosu.

== Club career ==
Rio made his league debut for Sagan against Yokohama F. Marinos on the 23 June 2021.

After joining FC Wacker Innsbruck on loan in July 2021, Nitta quickly established himself as a key player for the club's reserve side, scoring 16 goals in his first 13 games. This includes a hattrick on his debut against SV Innsbruck on 24 August 2021. He made his debut for the main Wacker squad in 2. Liga on 19 February 2022 against Kapfenberger SV. He scored his first goal for the main Wacker squad against SK Vorwärts Steyr on the 4 March 2022, scoring in the 88th minute.

On 6 July 2023, SKN St. Pölten signed a two-year contract with Nitta with the option to extend it. He made his debut for the club against SKU Amstetten on the 30 September 2022. He scored his first goal for the club against First Vienna FC on the 7 April 2023, scoring in the 81st minute.

On 27 June 2024, Nitta returned to Japan and signed with Urawa Red Diamonds.

== International career ==
Rio made his debut for the Japan U19s on the 31 May 2022.
