= Taichi Kikuchi =

Japanese footballer

Personal information
- Date of birth: 7 May 1999 (age 27)
- Place of birth: Saitama, Japan
- Height: 1.60 m (5 ft 3 in)
- Position: Winger

Team information
- Current team: Nagoya Grampus
- Number: 33

Youth career
- Urawa Tsuji SSS
- –2014: Urawa Reds
- 2015–2017: RKU Kashiwa High School

College career
Years	Team	Apps	(Gls)
2018–2021	Ryutsu Keizai University		

Senior career*
Years	Team	Apps	(Gls)
2018	Ryutsu Keizai University FC	2	(1)
2022–2024	Sagan Tosu	80	(0)
2025–	Nagoya Grampus	38	(2)
- * Club domestic league appearances and goals as of 12 August 2026

Taichi Kikuchi (菊地 泰智, Kikuchi Taichi; born 7 May 1999) is a Japanese footballer currently playing as a winger for Nagoya Grampus.

== Career statistics ==
=== Club ===
As of 19 February 2022.

Club	Season	League			National Cup		League Cup		Other		Total	
Club	Season	Division	Apps	Goals	Apps	Goals	Apps	Goals	Apps	Goals	Apps	Goals
Ryutsu Keizai University FC	2018	Kantō Soccer League	2	1	0	0	–		0	0	2	1
Ryutsu Keizai University	2019	–			2 (Note: Appearances in the Emperor's Cup)	1	–		0	0	2	1
Ryutsu Keizai University	2021	–			1	0	–		0	0	1	0
Ryutsu Keizai University	Total		0	0	3	1	0	0	0	0	3	1
Sagan Tosu	2022	J1 League	1	0	0	0	0	0	0	0	1	0
Career total			3	1	3	1	0	0	0	0	6	2

== Honours ==
Nagoya Grampus

- J.League Cup: 2024
