= Yuya Asano =

Japanese footballer (born 1997)

Yuya Asano 浅野 雄也
Personal information
- Date of birth: 17 February 1997 (age 29)
- Place of birth: Mie, Japan
- Height: 1.73 m (5 ft 8 in)
- Positions: Attacking midfielder; forward

Team information
- Current team: Nagoya Grampus
- Number: 9

Youth career
- –2008: Perna SC
- 2009–2001: Happu Junior High School
- 2012–2014: Yokkaichi Yogo High School

College career
Years	Team	Apps	(Gls)
2015–2018	Osaka University H&SS		

Senior career*
Years	Team	Apps	(Gls)
2019	Mito HollyHock	24	(3)
2019–2022	Sanfrecce Hiroshima	81	(11)
2019	→ Mito HollyHock (loan)	10	(1)
2023–2024	Hokkaido Consadole Sapporo	56	(16)
2025–	Nagoya Grampus	41	(2)
- * Club domestic league appearances and goals as of 12 August 2026

Yuya Asano (浅野 雄也, Asano Yūya; born 17 February 1997) is a Japanese professional footballer who plays as an attacking midfielder or a forward for J1 League club Nagoya Grampus.

His elder brother Takuma is also a professional footballer.

== Career ==
On 16 August 2019 Asano was signed by Sanfrecce Hiroshima and was immediately loaned back out to Mito HollyHock until 31 January 2020.

In December 2024, it was announced that Asano would be joining Nagoya Grampus.
