= Yota Sato =

Yota Sato may refer to:

- Yota Sato (boxer)
- Yota Sato (footballer)
