= Nagoya Grampus =

Association football club in Japan

Nagoya Grampus 名古屋グランパス
- Full name: Nagoya Grampus
- Nicknames: Grampus (Risso's Dolphin), G8
- Founded: 1939; 87 years ago as Toyota Motor SC
- Stadium: Toyota Stadium; New Paloma Mizuho Stadium
- Capacity: 44,692 (Toyota Stadium); 30,000 (Mizuho Stadium)
- Owner: Toyota
- Chairman: Toyo Kato
- Manager: Mihailo Petrović
- League: J1 League
- 2026: J1 League, 6th of 20
- Website: nagoya-grampus.jp
Home colours	Away colours

Nagoya Grampus (Note: Japanese: 名古屋グランパス, Hepburn: Nagoya Guranpasu) is a Japanese association football club based in Nagoya, Aichi. The club plays in the J1 League, and has been in the league for all but one season since the league's inauguration, following promotion from the J2 League in 2017.

It was founded as the company team of the Toyota Motor Corp. in 1939, the club shared its home games between Mizuho Athletic Stadium (capacity 27,000 and the J.League's oldest serving stadium) and the much larger Toyota Stadium in the city of Toyota (capacity 45,000).

Nagoya Grampus had its most successful season up to 1996 when it was managed by Arsène Wenger, well known for his subsequent exploits at Arsenal. They won the Emperor's Cup and finished second in the J.League, with their FR Yugoslavia captain Dragan Stojković being named J.League MVP. The 1995 success was eclipsed on November 20, 2010, when the club won its first J.League trophy, under the management of Stojković.

The club's name was derived from two prominent symbols of Nagoya. The first is the shachihoko (tiger-headed carp) statues atop Nagoya Castle, also called shachi; this word is a homophone with the Japanese word for orca, a species formerly referred to as "grampus". The second is the maru-hachi (circle-eight), Nagoya's official emblem. The team's mascot is Grampus-kun, an orca.

Nagoya Grampus have won 1 J1 League, 2 Emperor's Cup, 2 J.League Cup and 2 Japanese Super Cup in the club history.

== History ==
=== Early years as Toyota Motor SC (1939–1991) ===
The club was founded as Toyota Motor Soccer Club, the company team of the automobile manufacturer Toyota. During the early decades of Japanese corporate football, the team competed mainly in regional competitions and company leagues. Toyota Motor SC was overshadowed by its colleague Toyota Automated Loom Works SC (founded in 1946 and which was one of the founding members of the Japan Soccer League). When Toyota ALW were relegated to regional leagues in 1968, Toyota Motor saw an opportunity to rise at their expense.

In 1972, Toyota Motor SC was one of the founding members of the JSL's Second Division and its inaugural champions. They remained in the JSL until the J.League's founding in 1993. They were relegated to the JSL Division 2 in 1977.

Toyota Motor SC returned to the top tier after finishing as runners-up in the 1989–90 season. As Japanese football prepared to transition into professionalism, the club underwent restructuring and in 1990 adopted the name 'Nagoya Grampus Eight', reflecting its connection to the city of Nagoya and local cultural symbols. The name "Grampus" refers to the golden shachihoko (often interpreted as dolphin-like creatures) that decorate the roof of Nagoya Castle, while "Eight" derives from the stylised symbol of Nagoya city, which resembles the character for the number eight.

=== Founding member of the J.League (1992–1999) ===
Nagoya Grampus Eight was an original member ("Original Ten" (Note: The Original Ten of the J.League in 1992 were Kashima Antlers, Urawa Red Diamonds, JEF United Ichihara, Verdy Kawasaki, Yokohama Marinos, Yokohama Flügels, Shimizu S-Pulse, Nagoya Grampus Eight, Gamba Osaka and Sanfrecce Hiroshima.)) of the J.League in 1993. The club initially struggled in the early years of the new professional era, finishing near the bottom of the league standings in 1993 and 1994.

However in 1995, Nagoya Grampus Eight fortunes improved dramatically following the appointment of future Arsenal manager Arsène Wenger led Grampus to the 1995 Emperor's Cup final defeating Sanfrecce Hiroshima 3–0 winning their first major silverware in the club history and also finishing as the J1 League runners-up in the 1995 season.

In 1999, Nagoya Grampus Eight then continued to establish itself as a competitive club by winning the 1999 Emperor's Cup defeating Sanfrecce Hiroshima 2–0.

=== Consolidation and rebuilding (2000–2007) ===
During the early 2000s, Nagoya Grampus Eight remained a regular participant in the top division but struggled to consistently challenge for major titles. The club maintained a stable presence in the J.League with notable players such as Seigo Narazaki, who became one of the most prominent goalkeepers in Japanese football.

Despite occasional strong league finishes, Nagoya Grampus Eight experienced a downturn in the mid-2000s, finishing 14th in the 2005 season. This prompted a rebuilding period aimed at returning the club to competitiveness.

=== League champions under Dragan Stojković (2008–2013) ===
A new era began in 2008 where the club's name "Nagoya Grampus Eight" was shorten to just "Nagoya Grampus" at the start of the 2008 season. Nagoya Grampus then started off the season appointing former player Dragan Stojković as manager. Under his leadership, Nagoya adopted a more attacking style of play and quickly improved its league performances. They finished in third place in the 2008 season and qualified for the AFC Champions League for the first time.

In the 2009 AFC Champions League, Nagoya Grampus was drawn in Group E alongside Australian club Newcastle Jets, Korean club Ulsan Hyundai and Chinese club Beijing Guoan. The club then went to top the group stage with 12 points thus advancing to the knockout stage. In the round of 16, Nagoya Grampus face against another Korean club Suwon Samsung Bluewings winning them 2–1 thus advancing to the quarter-finals facing off Kawasaki Frontale. Both team was leveled 3–3 on aggregate where Joshua Kennedy went on to scored in the 88th minute to put Nagoya Grampus 4–3 on aggregate seeing them advanced to the semi-finals. However, Nagoya Grampus ended up losing 8–3 on aggregate to Saudi Arabian club Al-Ittihad thus bowing out from the competition.

==== First top flight league title ====
Nagoya Grampus reached the peak of its history in the 2010 season when it won its first top flight league title. Stojković has since led the club to winning the J1 League, featuring a squad consisting of Marcus Tulio Tanaka, Mu Kanazaki, Seigo Narazaki, Yoshizumi Ogawa, Keiji Tamada and Joshua Kennedy. Joshua Kennedy went on to finished as the league's top-joint goalscorer with 17 goals alongside Júbilo Iwata player Ryoichi Maeda. The victory was followed by further success in 2011, when Nagoya won the 2011 Japanese Super Cup, defeating Kashima Antlers 3–1 on penalties shootout.

=== Decline and managerial changes (2014–2015) ===
Following several competitive seasons, Nagoya Grampus entered a period of decline during the mid-2010s. After the departure of long-time manager Dragan Stojković at the end of the 2013 season, the club appointed Akira Nishino as head coach ahead of the 2014 season. During the 2014 season, Nagoya struggled with inconsistent form despite possessing experienced players. The club finished in the lower half of the table finishing in 10th place.

The difficulties continued in 2015 as Nagoya failed to significantly improve their league performance. The team again finished 10th in the league standings, and Nishino left the club at the end of the season after two years in charge. The period marked the beginning of a broader decline that ultimately culminated in the club's relegation from the J1 League the following year.

=== Relegation and return (2016–2018) ===
After a poor 2016 season, Grampus were relegated to J2 League for the first time in their history. Boško Gjurovski left his post as manager. On 4 January 2017, Yahiro Kazama was appointed as the club's new manager. On 3 December 2017, Nagoya Grampus drew 0–0 against Avispa Fukuoka in the promotion play-offs final, securing promotion back to J1 League at the first time of asking due to their higher regular season position than Avispa Fukuoka.

=== Return to competitiveness and silverware (2019–present) ===
After stabilising in the top flight following their 2017 promotion, Nagoya Grampus entered a period of rebuilding and gradual improvement from 2019 onward. On 23 September 2019, Massimo Ficcadenti was appointed as the club's new manager. In the 2020 season, Nagoya Grampus finished third in the J1 League, marking their highest league placement in nearly a decade and securing qualification for the 2021 AFC Champions League.

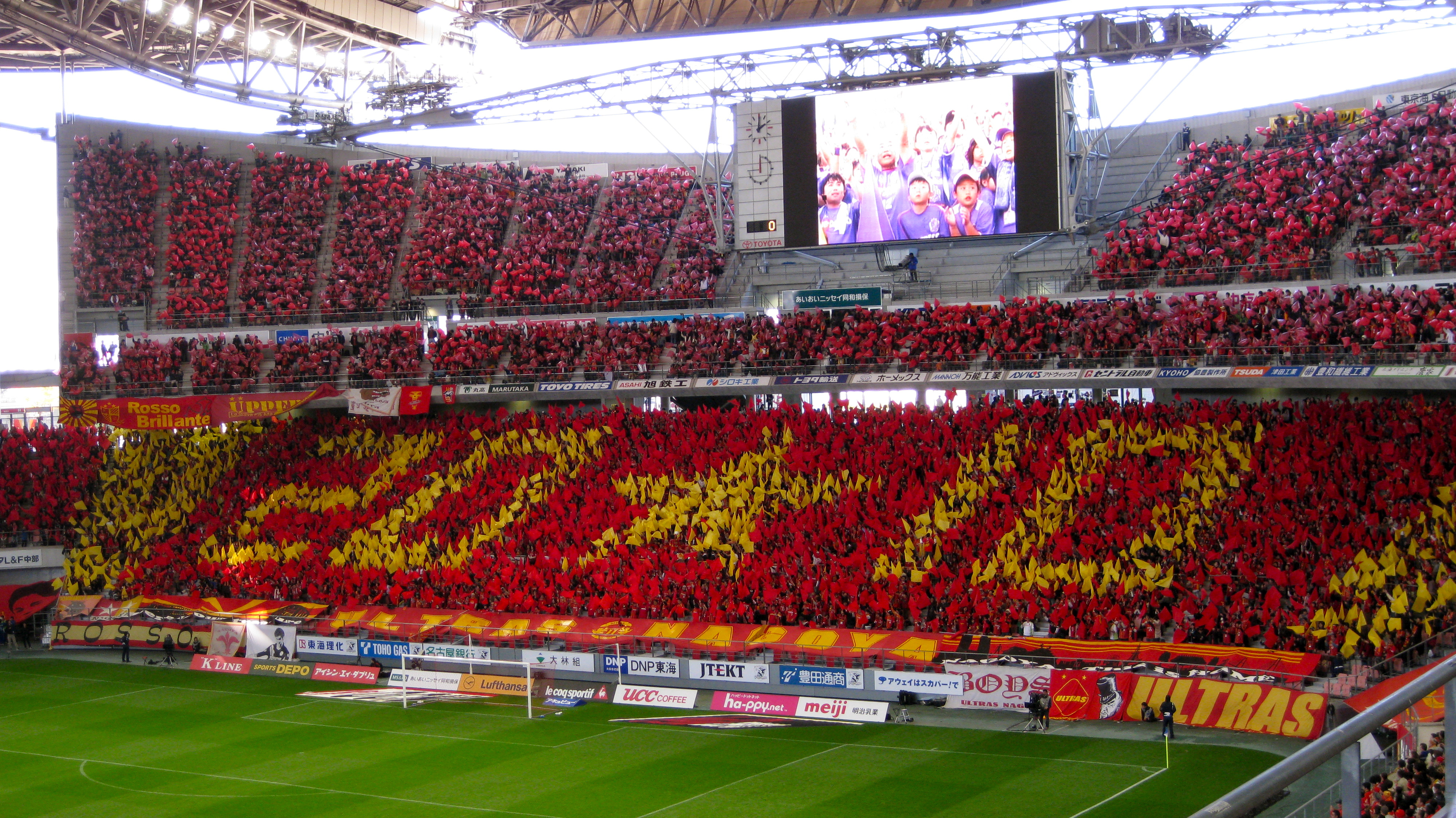
Nagoya Grampus Ultras at the Toyota Stadium

In the 2021 AFC Champions League, Nagoya Grampus was drawn in Group G alongside Korean club Pohang Steelers, Malaysian club Johor Darul Ta'zim and Thailand club Ratchaburi. Nagoya Grampus went on to have a good record in the group stage with 5 wins, 1 draw and 0 lost finishing with 16 points to top the group thus advancing to the knockout stage. Nagoya Grampus then face off against another Korean club Daegu in the round of 16 winning them 4–2 which Nagoya Grampus advance to the quarter-finals, however, they lost 3–0 to eventual finalist Pohang Steelers thus knocked out from the competition. Domestically in the same year, proved historic as Nagoya Grampus ended an 11-year trophy drought by winning the 2021 J.League Cup with Ficcadenti guiding the club to a 2–0 victory over Cerezo Osaka. However, Nagoya Grampus didn't renew a contract with Ficcadenti, and appointed Kenta Hasegawa as their new manager.

In subsequent seasons, the club has maintained a position near the top of the J1 League table, continuing to compete in domestic and continental competitions while emphasizing youth development and tactical consistency under the current managerial team.

The 2024 season marked Nagoya Grampus seventh consecutive year in the J1 League, continuing under manager Kenta Hasegawa. In the league, Nagoya Grampus finished in 11th place, ending the season with a mix of wins, draws, and losses as the team sought consistency in its domestic campaign. Nagoya Grampus's J.League Cup campaign was significantly more successful. The club reached the final of the J.League Cup. Nagoya Grampus then went on to defeat Albirex Niigata 5–4 on penalties shootout to win the J.League Cup, securing their second J.League Cup in three years.

== Team image ==
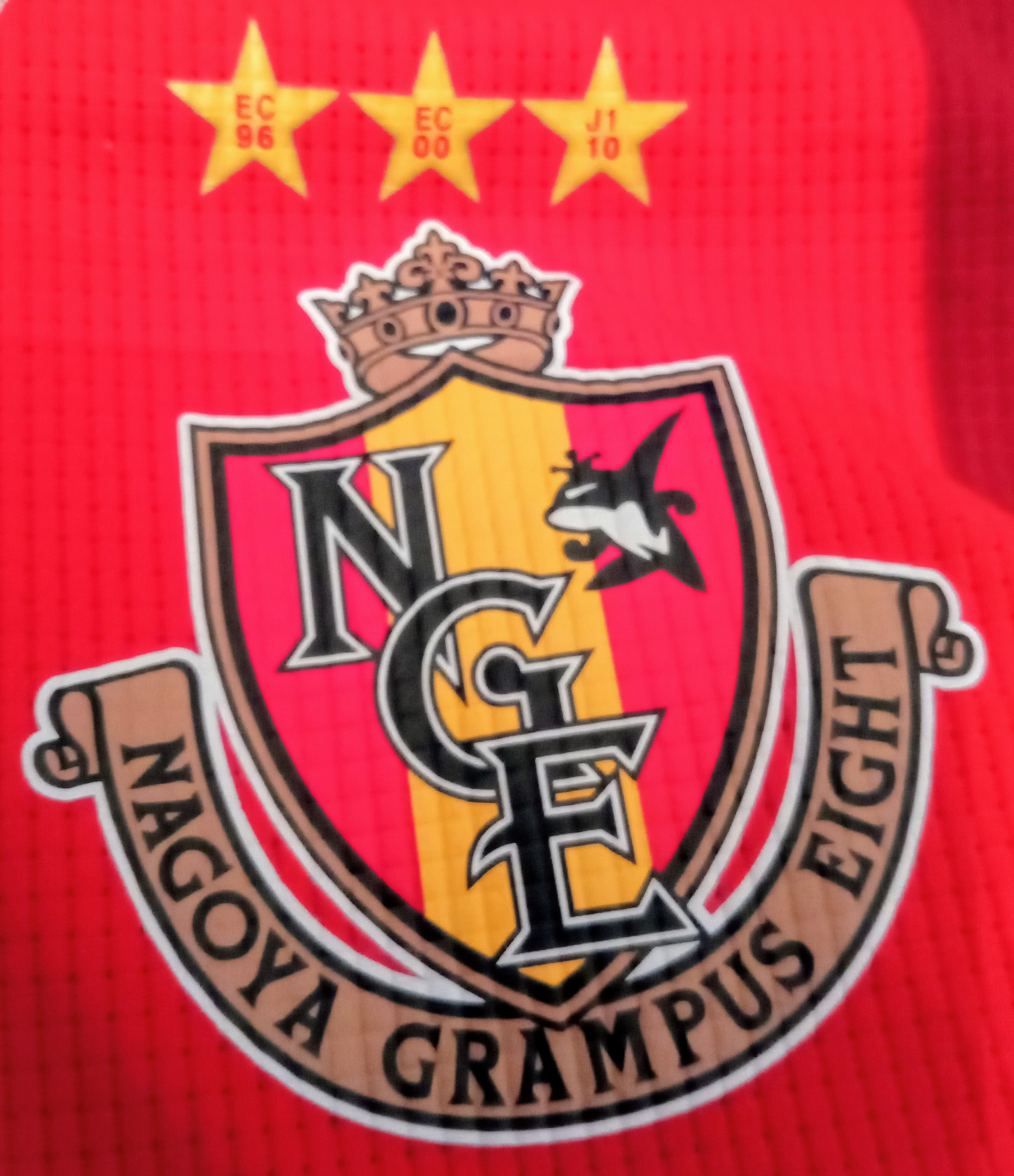
Nagoya Grampus former crest from 1990 to 2023

=== Crest ===
The redesign was unveiled Nagoya Grampus introduced a redesigned club crest ahead of the 2021 season, modernising the emblem while retaining the symbolic golden shachihoko associated with Nagoya Castle and the club's identity. The modern crest also prominently features the letter 'G', representing "Grampus," along with the club's colours of red, gold, and black. These elements together reflect both the club's competitive spirit and its heritage within Japanese football.

=== Supporters ===
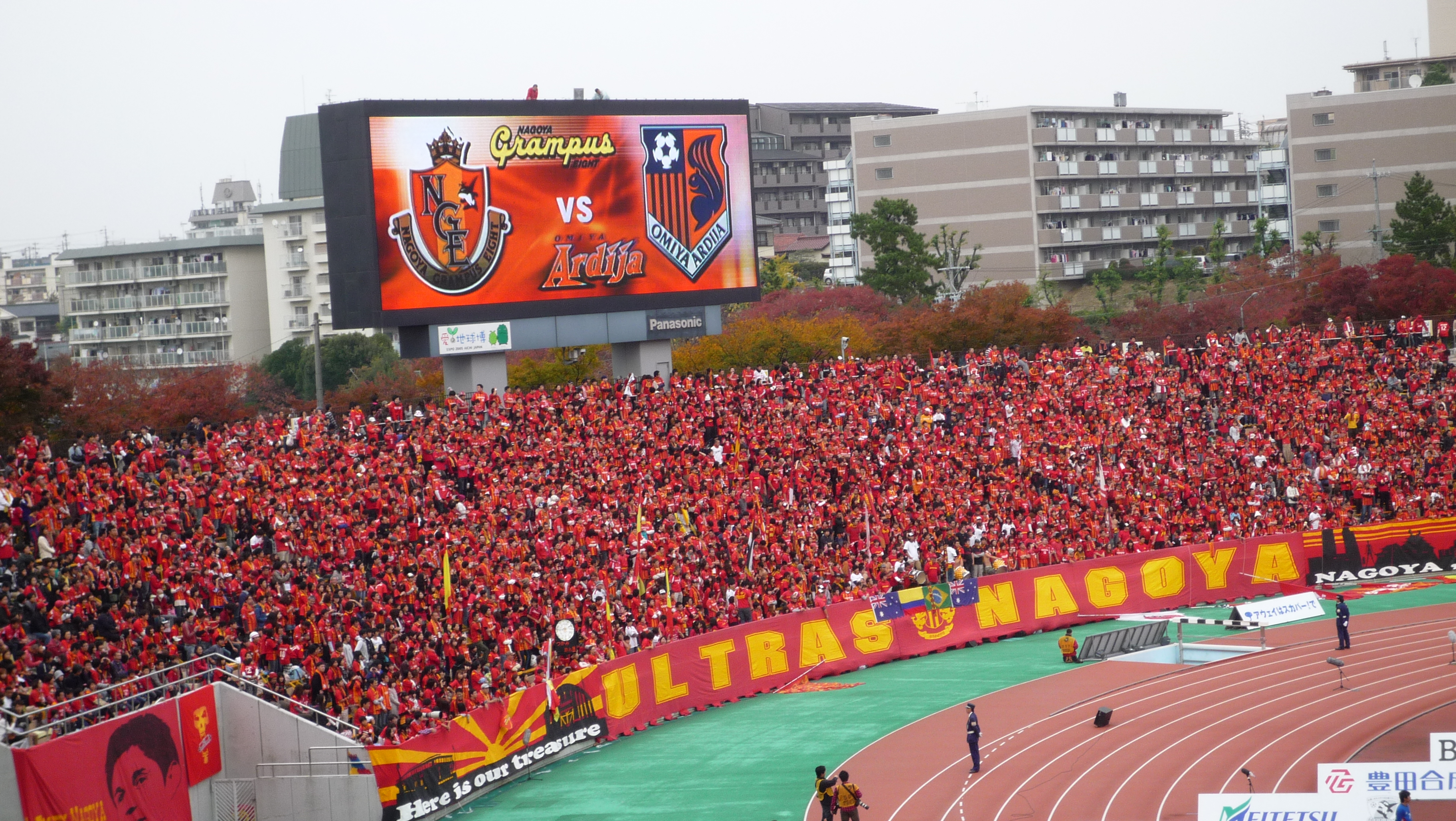
Ultras Nagoya

Nagoya Grampus supporters are known for their passionate displays in the stands, often featuring coordinated chants, banners, and flag-waving during matches at Toyota Stadium and occasionally at Paloma Mizuho Stadium. Organised fan groups, such as the 'Red Sharks' and 'Ultras Grampus', play a central role in creating matchday atmosphere, including choreographed tifo displays and vocal support.

=== In popular culture ===
In the Captain Tsubasa manga series, one character was player of Nagoya Grampus and is the goalkeeper Ken Wakashimazu which was player of Yokohama Flügels before the closing of the Yokohama team. In 2013, the midfielder Shingo Aoi wear the Nagoya Grampus jersey in a Yoichi Takahashi tribute to the 20 years of J.League.

== Stadium ==
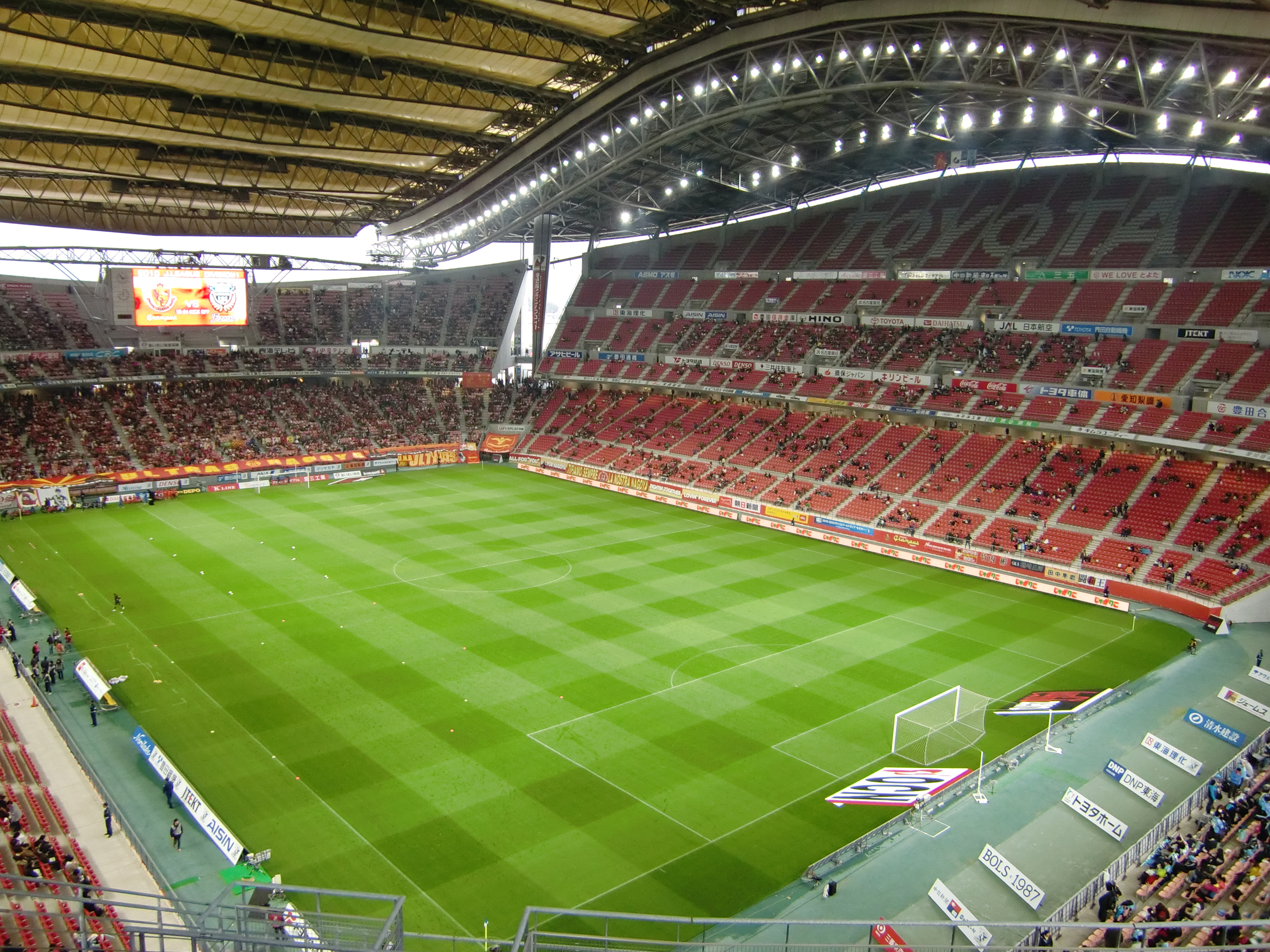
Toyota Stadium

Nagoya Grampus plays its home matches primarily at Toyota Stadium, located in Aichi Prefecture, Japan. Opened in 2001, the stadium has a seating capacity of approximately 45,000 and features a modern design with a retractable roof and natural grass pitch. It is one of the largest and most advanced football-specific stadiums in Japan, regularly hosting domestic league matches as well as international fixtures.

Before moving to Toyota Stadium, Nagoya Grampus used Paloma Mizuho Stadium in Nagoya as their home ground. Paloma Mizuho Stadium, which opened in 1941, is a multi-purpose venue with a capacity of around 27,000, and served as the club's primary stadium during the early J.League years.

Nagoya occasionally uses Paloma Mizuho Stadium for special matches, including high-profile league games or when Toyota Stadium is unavailable to host a football match. The club also conducts training sessions and youth development programs at nearby facilities in Aichi Prefecture.

== Kit suppliers and shirt sponsors ==
=== Sponsors ===
Year	Kit manufacturer	Main sponsor
1992	(France) Le Coq Sportif	No main sponsor
1993−1996	(Japan) Mizuno	No main sponsor
1997−2000	(France) Le Coq Sportif	No main sponsor
2001−2016	(France) Le Coq Sportif	(Japan) Toyota
2017−2020	(Japan) Mizuno	(Japan) Toyota
2021	(Japan) Mizuno	(Japan) Toyota (home kit) (Japan) Yaris (away kit)
2022	(Japan) Mizuno	(Japan) Toyota (Yaris)
2023	(Japan) Mizuno	(Japan) Toyota (86)
2024−2025	(Japan) Mizuno	(Japan) Toyota (Yaris)
2026−present	(Japan) Mizuno	(Japan) Toyota (Corolla)

=== Kit evolution ===
Home kit - 1st
1992	1993	1994 - 1996	1997	1998
1999 - 2000	2001 - 2002	2003 - 2004	2005 - 2006	2007 - 2008
2009 - 2010	2011 - 2012	2013 - 2014	2015	2016
2017	2018	2019	2020	2021
2022	2023	2024	2025	2026 -

Away kit - 2nd
1992	1993	1994 - 1996	1997	1998
1999 - 2000	2001 - 2002	2003 - 2004	2005 - 2006	2007 - 2008
2009 - 2010	2011 - 2012	2013 - 2014	2015	2016
2017	2018	2019	2020	2021
2022	2023	2024	2025	2026 -

Alternative Kits
2001 - 2002 3rd	2011; 1st ACL	2012; 1st ACL	2012; 20th Anniversary	2013; 20th Anniversary
2014; Nagoya TV Tower; 60th Anniversary	2017; 25th Anniversary	2018; J.League; 25th Anniversary	2019; Shachi Festival	2021; Shachi Festival
2022 Great Celebration of Tai	2023 Great Celebration of Tuna	2024 Great Celebration of Tuna	2025; Shachi Festival	

== Affiliated clubs ==
- (Italy) AS Roma (2022−present)

On 25 November 2022, Nagoya Grampus sign partnership with Serie A club, AS Roma.

- (England) Everton (2025−present)

On 21 August 2025, Nagoya Grampus signed a similar partnership with Premier League club, Everton.

== Players ==
=== First-team squad ===
As of 16 October 2026

Note: Flags indicate national team as defined under FIFA eligibility rules; some limited exceptions apply. Players may hold more than one non-FIFA nationality.

No.	Pos.	Nation	Player
1	GK	JPN	Daniel Schmidt
2	DF	JPN	Yuki Nogami
3	DF	JPN	Yota Sato
7	MF	JPN	Ryuji Izumi (captain)
9	MF	JPN	Yuya Asano
10	FW	BRA	Mateus
11	FW	JPN	Yuya Yamagishi
13	DF	JPN	Haruya Fujii
14	MF	JPN	Tsukasa Morishima
15	MF	JPN	Sho Inagaki
16	GK	JPN	Yohei Takeda
17	MF	JPN	Takuya Uchida
18	FW	JPN	Kensuke Nagai
19	MF	JPN	Hidemasa Koda
22	FW	JPN	Yudai Kimura
25	FW	BRA	Marcus Índio

No.	Pos.	Nation	Player
27	MF	JPN	Katsuhiro Nakayama
30	FW	JPN	Shungo Sugiura
31	MF	JPN	Tomoki Takamine (on loan from Hokkaido Consadole Sapporo)
33	MF	JPN	Taichi Kikuchi
35	GK	JPN	Alexandre Pisano
36	GK	JPN	Hiroaki Hagi
37	DF	JPN	Harumu Kubo
41	MF	JPN	Masahito Ono
44	DF	JPN	Rekuto Shiraogawa ^{Type 2}
45	DF	JPN	Chisom Taichi Odeike ^{Type 2}
46	DF	JPN	Ryuki Oiso ^{DSP}
47	DF	JPN	Yuzo Takeuchi ^{Type 2}
49	MF	JPN	Sakuto Fukaya ^{Type 2}
55	DF	JPN	Shuhei Tokumoto (vice-captain)
58	MF	JPN	Tomoya Koyamatsu
70	DF	JPN	Teruki Hara

=== Out on loan ===
Note: Flags indicate national team as defined under FIFA eligibility rules; some limited exceptions apply. Players may hold more than one non-FIFA nationality.

No.	Pos.	Nation	Player
—	FW	JPN	Ryōga Kida (at (Argentina) Argentinos Juniors until 31 December 2026)
6	DF	JPN	Akinari Kawazura (at Mito HollyHock until 30 June 2027)
20	DF	JPN	KennedyEgbus Mikuni (at Avispa Fukuoka until 30 June 2027)
66	MF	JPN	Ryosuke Yamanaka (at Kyoto Sanga until 30 June 2027)
—	MF	JPN	Gen Kato (at RB Omiya Ardija until 30 June 2027)
—	DF	JPN	Ei Gyotoku (at Nagano Parceiro until 30 June 2027)

No.	Pos.	Nation	Player
—	DF	JPN	Soichiro Mori (at Fagiano Okayama until 30 June 2027)
—	MF	JPN	Ken Masui (at KV Kortrijk until 30 June 2027)
—	MF	JPN	Haruto Suzuki (at FC Gifu until 30 June 2027)
—	MF	JPN	Haruki Yoshida (at FC Ryukyu until 30 June 2027)
—	FW	JPN	Kyota Sakakibara (at Zweigen Kanazawa until 30 June 2027)

== Management and staff ==
Club staff for 2026-27

Position	Name
Sport Directors	(Japan) Kenji Hattori
Head Coach	(Serbia) Mihailo Petrović
Coaches	(Japan) Hiromu Watahiki (Japan) Keiji Yoshimura (Japan) Makoto Sunakawa (Japan) Keiji Tamada (Japan) Shunsuke Otsuka
Goalkeeper coach	(Japan) Seigo Narazaki
Assistant goalkeeper coach	(Japan) Toshihide Hirata
Analytical coach	(Japan) Ryosuke Sato (Japan) Kazuki Fukayama
Physical coach	(Japan) Kaito Yamada
Assistant physical coach	(Japan) Shunsuke Ito
Trainer	(Japan) Kazue Hozumi (Japan) Daisuke Adachi (Japan) Hiroki Kondo (Japan) Katsuki Ozaki
Physiotherapist	(Japan) Masakazu Mizutani (Japan) Toru Fujii
Chief doctor	(Japan) Shinya Ishizuka
Doctor	(Japan) Takuya Shimizu (Japan) Seiji Kondo (Japan) Tadahiro Sakai (Japan) Tatsuya Takahashi (Japan) Takafumi Mizuno
Team side manager	(Japan) Ryuki Roppongi
Side affairs	(Japan) Shinichi Kitano (Japan) Shinnosuke Ishizaka (Japan) Yasuhiro Tanigawa
Head of team development	(Japan) Naoshi Nakamura
Team development manager	(Japan) Yuto Ujihira
Dietitian	(Japan) Terumi Sato
Scout	(Japan) Yusuke Nakatani (Japan) Norifumi Takamoto (Japan) Masahiro Koga
Interpreter	(Japan) Tonny Sasaki

== Honours ==
As Toyota Motor SC (1939–1991) and as Nagoya Grampus (1991–present)

Type	Honours	Titles	Season
League	J1 League	1	2010
League	Japan Soccer League Division 2	1	1972
Cup	Emperor's Cup	2	1995, 1999
Cup	J.League Cup	2	2021, 2024
Cup	Japanese Super Cup	2	1996, 2011
Cup	All Japan Senior Football Championship	2	1968, 1970
Cup	Konica Cup	1	1991
Worldwide	Sanwa Bank Cup	1	1997

Bold is for those competition that are currently active.

== Record and statistics ==
As of 27 March 2026.

Top 10 all-time appearances
Rank	Player	Years	Club appearance
1	(Japan) Seigo Narazaki	1999–2018	660
2	(Japan) Naoshi Nakamura	2001–2014	442
3	(Japan) Yoshizumi Ogawa	2007–2016	375
4	(Japan) Tetsuya Okayama	1992–2004	353
5	(Japan) Keiji Tamada	2006–2014	351
6	(Japan) Kensuke Nagai	2011–2012, 2013–2016, 2022–present	348
7	(Japan) Takahiro Masukawa	2005–2013	315
8	(Japan) Shohei Abe	2006–2013	295
9	(Japan) Masahiro Koga	1997–2006	288
10	(Japan) Keiji Yoshimura	2002–2012	287

Top 10 all-time goalscorer
Rank	Player	Club appearance	Total goals
1	(Brazil) Ueslei	151	100
2	(Japan) Keiji Tamada	351	89
3	(Japan) Kensuke Nagai	348	81
4	(Australia) Joshua Kennedy	155	72
5	(Japan) Tetsuya Okayama	353	69
7	(Japan) Yasuyuki Moriyama	217	68
7	(Serbia) Dragan Stojković	225	68
8	(Japan) Takashi Hirano	261	55
9	(Brazil) Mateus Castro	178	54
10	(Japan) Yoshizumi Ogawa	255	52

- Biggest wins: 12–0 vs Toyota SC (12 July 2014)
- Heaviest defeats: 0–9 vs Shonan Bellmare (21 January 1978)
- Youngest ever debutant: Ryotaro Ishida ~ 16 years 8 months 9 days old (On 22 August 2018 vs Sanfrecce Hiroshima)
- Oldest ever player: Seigo Narazaki ~ 41 years 5 months 2 days old (On 17 August 2019 vs Zweigen Kanazawa)
- Youngest goal scorers: Ryōga Kida ~ 17 years 9 months 4 days old (On 19 April 2023 vs Yokohama FC)
- Oldest goal scorers: Keiji Tamada ~ 38 years 6 months 23 days old (On 3 November 2018 vs Vissel Kobe)

== Award winners ==
As of the end of the 2025 season.

- J.League Player of the Year:

- (Federal Republic of Yugoslavia) Dragan Stojković (1995)
- (Japan) Seigo Narazaki (2010)

- J.League Top Scorer:

- (Brazil) Ueslei (2003)
- (Australia) Joshua Kennedy (2010, 2011)
- (Brazil) Jô (2018)

- J.League Best XI:

- (Federal Republic of Yugoslavia) Dragan Stojković (1995, 1996, 1999)
- (Brazil) Ueslei (2003)
- (Japan) Seigo Narazaki (2003, 2008, 2010, 2011)
- (Brazil) Marques (2004)
- (Japan) Yoshizumi Ogawa (2008)
- (Australia) Joshua Kennedy (2010, 2011)
- (Colombia) Danilson Córdoba (2010)
- (Japan) Marcus Tulio Tanaka (2010, 2011, 2012)
- (Japan) Takahiro Masukawa (2010)
- (Japan) Jungo Fujimoto (2011)
- (Brazil) Jô (2018)
- (Australia) Mitchell Langerak (2021)
- (Japan) Sho Inagaki (2021, 2025)

- J.League Best Young Player:

- (Japan) Yoshizumi Ogawa (2008)

- J.League Goal of the Year:

- (Japan) Taishi Taguchi against Kashima Antlers (21 May 2016)
- (Japan) Yoichiro Kakitani against Cerezo Osaka (27 November 2021)

- J.League Manager of the Year:

- (France) Arsène Wenger (1995)
- (Serbia) Dragan Stojković (2010)

=== FIFA World Cup players ===
The following players have been selected by their country in the FIFA World Cup, while playing for Nagoya Grampus:

- (Japan) Takashi Hirano (1998)
- (Federal Republic of Yugoslavia) Dragan Stojković (1998)
- (Japan) Seigo Narazaki (2002, 2006, 2010)
- (Japan) Keiji Tamada (2006, 2010)
- (Australia) Joshua Kennedy (2010)
- (Japan) Marcus Tulio Tanaka (2010)

== Managerial history ==
Manager	Period	Honours
(Japan) Tatsuya Shiji	1 July 1965–31 January 1975	– 1968 All Japan Senior Football Championship – 1970 All Japan Senior Football Championship – 1972 Japan Soccer League Division 2
(Japan) Masahiro Ozawa	1 February 1975–31 January 1978	
(Japan) Kenji Sogami	1 February 1978–39 June 1987	
(Brazil) Marcos Falopa	1991–1992	– 1991 Konica Cup
(Japan) Ryuzo Hiraki	1 July 1992–31 January 1993	
(England) Gordon Milne	1 February 1994–14 November 1994	
(Japan) Tetsuro Miura (caretaker)	15 November 1994–8 December 1994	
(France) Arsène Wenger	1 February 1995–30 September 1996	– 1995 Emperor's Cup – 1996 Japanese Super Cup
(Portugal) José Costa (caretaker)	30 September 1996–21 November 1996	
(Portugal) Carlos Queiroz	21 November 1996–31 January 1998	– 1996–97 Asian Cup Winners' Cup runners-up – 1997 Sanwa Bank Cup
(Japan) Koji Tanaka	1 February 1998–15 April 1999	
(France) Daniel Sanchez	15 April 1999–23 August 1999	
(Brazil) Mazarópi (caretaker)	27 August 1999–5 September 1999	– 1999 Emperor's Cup
(Brazil) João Carlos	7 September 1999–31 July 2001	
(Japan) Tetsuro Miura (2)	1 August 2001–31 January 2022	
(Slovenia) Zdenko Verdenik	1 February 2002–4 August 2003	
(Brazil) Nelsinho Baptista	29 July 2003–20 September 2005	
(Japan) Hitoshi Nakata (caretaker)	21 September 2005–31 December 2005	
(Netherlands) Sef Vergoossen	1 January 2006–31 December 2007	
(Serbia) Dragan Stojković	22 January 2008–7 December 2013	– 2010 J1 League – 2011 Japanese Super Cup
(Japan) Akira Nishino	25 December 2013–22 November 2015	
(Japan) Takafumi Ogura	24 November 2015–23 August 2016	
(North Macedonia) Boško Gjurovski (caretaker)	23 August 2016–6 November 2016	
(Japan) Yahiro Kazama	4 January 2017–23 September 2019	
(Italy) Massimo Ficcadenti	23 September 2019–9 December 2021	– 2021 J.League Cup
(Japan) Kenta Hasegawa	9 December 2021–31 December 2025	– 2024 J.League Cup
(Serbia) Mihailo Petrović	1 January 2026–present	

- Notes:

Nationality is indicated by the corresponding FIFA country code(s).

== Season by season record ==
Champions	Runners-up	Third place	Promoted	Relegated

Season	Div.	Teams	Position	Attendance/G	J.League Cup	Emperor's Cup	Asia	Position
1992	–	–	–	–	Semi-final	1st round	Did not qualify	Did not qualify
1993	J1	10	9th	19,858	Group stage	Quarter-final	Did not qualify	Did not qualify
1994	J1	12	11th	21,842	First round	2nd round	Did not qualify	Did not qualify
1995	J1	14	3rd	21,463	–	Winners	Did not qualify	Did not qualify
1996	J1	16	2nd	21,699	Group stage	3rd round	Did not qualify	Did not qualify
1997	J1	17	9th	14,750	Semi-final	3rd round	CWC	Runners-up
1998	J1	18	5th	13,993	Group stage	Semi-final	Did not qualify	Did not qualify
1999	J1	16	4th	14,688	Semi-final	Winners	Did not qualify	Did not qualify
2000	J1	16	9th	14,114	Semi-final	Round of 16	Did not qualify	Did not qualify
2001	J1	16	5th	16,974	Semi-final	3rd round	CWC	Quarter-finals
2002	J1	16	6th	16,323	Group stage	Round of 16	Did not qualify	Did not qualify
2003	J1	16	7th	16,768	Semi-final	Round of 16	Did not qualify	Did not qualify
2004	J1	16	7th	15,712	Semi-final	Round of 16	Did not qualify	Did not qualify
2005	J1	18	14th	13,288	Group stage	Round of 16	Did not qualify	Did not qualify
2006	J1	18	7th	14,924	Group stage	Round of 16	Did not qualify	Did not qualify
2007	J1	18	11th	15,585	Group stage	Round of 16	Did not qualify	Did not qualify
2008	J1	18	3rd	16,555	Semi-final	Quarter-final	Did not qualify	Did not qualify
2009	J1	18	9th	15,928	Quarter-final	Runners-up	CL	Semi-final
2010	J1	18	1st	19,979	Group stage	Quarter-final	Did not qualify	Did not qualify
2011	J1	18	2nd	16,741	Semi-final	Quarter-final	CL	Round of 16
2012	J1	18	7th	17,155	Quarter-final	Quarter-final	CL	Round of 16
2013	J1	18	11th	16,135	Group stage	Second round	Did not qualify	Did not qualify
2014	J1	18	10th	16,734	Group stage	Quarter-final	Did not qualify	Did not qualify
2015	J1	18	9th	16,240	Quarter-final	Second round	Did not qualify	Did not qualify
2016	J1	18	16th	17,729	Group stage	Second round	Did not qualify	Did not qualify
2017	J2	22	3rd	15,365	Not eligible	Round of 16	Did not qualify	Did not qualify
2018	J1	18	15th	24,961	Group stage	3rd round	Did not qualify	Did not qualify
2019	J1	18	13th	27,612	Quarter-final	Second round	Did not qualify	Did not qualify
2020 †	J1	18	3rd	8,537	Quarter-final	Not eligible	Did not qualify	Did not qualify
2021 †	J1	20	5th	11,080	Winners	Quarter-final	CL	Quarter-final
2022	J1	18	8th	18,813	Quarter-final	Round of 16	Did not qualify	Did not qualify
2023	J1	18	6th	27,504	Semi-final	Quarter-final	Did not qualify	Did not qualify
2024	J1	20	11th	27,650	Winners	2nd round	Did not qualify	Did not qualify
2025	J1	20	16th	32,263	2nd round	Quarter-final	Did not qualify	Did not qualify
2026	J1	10	6th	30,853	N/A	N/A	Did not qualify	Did not qualify
2026-27	J1	20	TBD		TBD	2nd round	Did not qualify	Did not qualify

Key

- Pos. = Position in league
- Attendance/G = Average league attendance
- † 2020 & 2021 seasons attendances reduced by COVID-19 worldwide pandemic.
- Source: J. League Data Site

== League history ==
- Regional League (Tokai Adult Soccer League): 1966–71
- Division 2 (JSL Div. 2): 1972
- Division 1 (JSL Div. 1): 1973–77
- Division 2 (JSL Div. 2): 1978–86
- Division 1 (JSL Div. 1): 1987
- Division 2 (JSL Div. 2): 1988–89
- Division 1 (JSL Div. 1): 1990–91
- Division 1 (J.League Div. 1): 1992–2016
- Division 2 (J2 League): 2017
- Division 1 (J.League Div. 1): 2018

As of 2025: 41 seasons in the top tier, 13 seasons in the second tier and 6 seasons in the Regional Leagues.

== See also ==
- Grampus-kun (The team mascot)
