= Tomoki Takamine =

Japanese footballer

Tomoki Takamine 高嶺 朋樹
Personal information
- Date of birth: 29 December 1997 (age 28)
- Place of birth: Hokkaido, Japan
- Height: 1.77 m (5 ft 10 in)
- Position: Defensive midfielder

Team information
- Current team: Nagoya Grampus
- Number: 31

Youth career
- Abashiri City SSS
- Makomanai Minami SS
- –2015: Hokkaido Consadole Sapporo

College career
Years	Team	Apps	(Gls)
2016–2019	University of Tsukuba		

Senior career*
Years	Team	Apps	(Gls)
2019–2022	Hokkaido Consadole Sapporo	94	(2)
2023–2024	Kashiwa Reysol	42	(1)
2024–2025	Kortrijk	19	(0)
2025–2026	Hokkaido Consadole Sapporo	35	(10)
2026	→ Nagoya Grampus (loan)	19	(1)
2026-	→ Nagoya Grampus		
- * Club domestic league appearances and goals as of 30 June 2026

Tomoki Takamine (高嶺 朋樹, Takamine Tomoki; born 29 December 1997) is a Japanese footballer who plays as a defensive midfielder for J1 League club Nagoya Grampus.

== Club career ==
Takamine was born in Sapporo but lived in Kutchan during kindergarten and in Abashiri from first to second grade. From fourth grade, he spent nine years in the Hokkaido Consadole Sapporo academy but was unable to earn promotion to the first team, leading him to enroll at Tsukuba University. One of his university teammates was Kaoru Mitoma.

In March 2019, it was announced that he would join Hokkaido Consadole Sapporo from the 2020 season. That same month, he was approved as a Special Designated Player. On April 10 of the same year, he made his official debut as a substitute in the third round of the 2019 J.League Cup group stage against Shonan Bellmare.

In 2020, he officially joined Hokkaido Consadole Sapporo. In his first season, after Akito Fukumori suffered an injury, he filled in as a left center-back and later featured primarily as a defensive midfielder, playing in 30 matches.

On October 2, 2021, in J1 League Matchday 31 against Gamba Osaka, he scored his first professional goal with a powerful long-range shot. This goal was selected as the "Meiji Yasuda J1 League Goal of the Month" for October 2021.

On November 19, 2022, it was announced that Takamine would be transferring permanently to Kashiwa Reysol.

On 30 July 2024, Takamine signed a three-year contract with Kortrijk in Belgium.

On 5 January 2025, Takamine returned to J2 League club Hokkaido Consadole Sapporo on a permanent transfer.

On 18 June 2026, Takamine moved to Nagoya Grampus on a permanent transfer after spending the previous 6 months at the club on loan.

== Career statistics ==
=== Club ===
As of 30 June 2026

Appearances and goals by club, season and competition
Club	Season	League			National cup (Note: Includes Emperors Cup and Belgian Cup)		League cup (Note: Includes J.League Cup)		Total	
Club	Season	Division	Apps	Goals	Apps	Goals	Apps	Goals	Apps	Goals
University of Tsukuba	2016	–			1	0	–		1	0
University of Tsukuba	2017	–			4	0	–		4	0
University of Tsukuba	Total		0	0	5	0	0	0	5	0
Hokkaido Consadole Sapporo	2019	J1 League	0	0	0	0	2	0	2	0
Hokkaido Consadole Sapporo	2020	J1 League	30	0	0	0	4	0	34	0
Hokkaido Consadole Sapporo	2021	J1 League	38	1	2	0	9	0	49	1
Hokkaido Consadole Sapporo	2022	J1 League	26	2	0	0	3	0	29	2
Hokkaido Consadole Sapporo	Total		94	3	2	0	18	0	114	3
Kashiwa Reysol	2023	J1 League	31	0	5	1	4	0	40	1
Kashiwa Reysol	2024	J1 League	11	1	1	0	2	1	14	2
Kashiwa Reysol	Total		42	1	6	1	6	1	54	3
Kortrijk	2024–25	Belgian Pro League	19	0	2	0	0	0	21	0
Hokkaido Consadole Sapporo	2025	J2 League	35	10	1	0	0	0	36	10
Nagoya Grampus (loan)	2026	J1 (100)	19	1	–		–		19	1
Career total			201	14	16	1	24	1	241	16
