= Yudai Kimura =

Japanese footballer

Personal information
- Date of birth: 28 February 2001 (age 25)
- Place of birth: Sakai, Osaka, Japan
- Height: 1.85 m (6 ft 1 in)
- Position: Forward

Team information
- Current team: Nagoya Grampus
- Number: 22

Youth career
- YN Kickers
- Tokyo Verdy
- –2015: Vissel Kobe
- 2016–2018: Osaka Toin High School

College career
Years	Team	Apps	(Gls)
2019–2022	Kwansei Gakuin University		

Senior career*
Years	Team	Apps	(Gls)
2022–2024	Kyoto Sanga	14	(0)
2023	→ Zweigen Kanazawa (loan)	10	(1)
2024	→ Tokyo Verdy (loan)	36	(10)
2025	Tokyo Verdy	20	(2)
2025–	Nagoya Grampus	35	(10)
- * Club domestic league appearances and goals as of 12 August 2026

Yudai Kimura (木村 勇大, Kimura Yudai; born 28 February 2001) is a Japanese footballer who plays as a forward for Nagoya Grampus.

== Career statistics ==
=== Club ===
As of 19 February 2022.

Club	Season	League			National Cup		League Cup		Other		Total	
Club	Season	Division	Apps	Goals	Apps	Goals	Apps	Goals	Apps	Goals	Apps	Goals
Kwansei Gakuin University	2021	–			2 (Note: Appearances in the Emperor's Cup)	0	–		0	0	2	0
Kyoto Sanga	2021	J2 League	0	0	0	0	0	0	0	0	0	0
Kyoto Sanga	2022	J1 League	1	0	0	0	0	0	0	0	1	0
Career total			1	0	2	0	0	0	0	0	3	0

== Honours ==
Individual

- J1 100 Year Vision League Regional Round West Best Eleven: 2026
