= Takuya Uchida =

Japanese footballer

Takuya Uchida 内田 宅哉
Personal information
- Full name: Takuya Uchida
- Date of birth: 2 June 1998 (age 28)
- Place of birth: Chiba, Japan
- Height: 1.77 m (5 ft 10 in)
- Positions: Attacking midfielder; winger

Team information
- Current team: Nagoya Grampus
- Number: 17

Youth career
- –2010: JSC Chiba
- 2011–2016: FC Tokyo

Senior career*
Years	Team	Apps	(Gls)
2016–2023	FC Tokyo	41	(1)
2016–2019	→ FC Tokyo U-23 (loan)	73	(4)
2022–2023	→ Nagoya Grampus (loan)	48	(0)
2024–	→ Nagoya Grampus	51	(0)
- * Club domestic league appearances and goals as of 12 August 2026

Takuya Uchida (内田 宅哉, Uchida Takuya; born 2 June 1998) is a Japanese professional footballer who plays as an attacking midfielder for J1 League club Nagoya Grampus.

== Career ==
Takuya Uchida joined FC Tokyo in 2016. On 24 April, he made his debut in J3 League in a match against Gainare Tottori.

== Club statistics ==
As of start of the 2023 season

Appearances and goals by club, season and competition
Club	Season	League			Emperor's Cup		J.League Cup		Continental		Other		Total	
Club	Season	Division	Apps	Goals	Apps	Goals	Apps	Goals	Apps	Goals	Apps	Goals	Apps	Goals
FC Tokyo U-23 (loan)	2016	J3 League	12	1	—		—		—		—		12	1
FC Tokyo U-23 (loan)	2017	J3 League	27	2	—		—		—		—		27	2
FC Tokyo U-23 (loan)	2018	J3 League	15	1	—		—		—		—		15	1
FC Tokyo U-23 (loan)	2019	J3 League	19	0	—		—		—		—		19	0
FC Tokyo U-23 (loan)	Total		73	4	—		—		—		—		73	4
FC Tokyo	2017	J1 League	0	0	0	0	1	0	—		—		1	0
FC Tokyo	2018	J1 League	1	0	0	0	3	0	—		—		4	0
FC Tokyo	2019	J1 League	2	0	1	1	4	0	—		—		7	1
FC Tokyo	2020	J1 League	25	0	0	0	3	0	3 (Note: Appearances in AFC Champions League)	0	—		31	0
FC Tokyo	2021	J1 League	13	1	0	0	4	0	—		—		17	1
FC Tokyo	2022	J1 League	0	0	0	0	1	0	—		—		1	0
FC Tokyo	Total		41	1	1	1	16	0	3	0	—		61	2
Nagoya Grampus (loan)	2022	J1 League	19	0	3	0	1	0	—		—		23	0
Nagoya Grampus (loan)	2023	J1 League	0	0	0	0	0	0	—		—		0	0
Nagoya Grampus (loan)	Total		19	0	3	0	1	0	—		—		23	0
Career total			133	5	4	1	17	0	3	0	0	0	157	6

== Honours ==
FC Tokyo

- J.League Cup: 2020

Nagoya Grampus

- J.League Cup: 2024
