= Masahito Ono =

Japanese footballer (born 1996)

Masahito Ono 小野 雅史
Personal information
- Date of birth: 9 August 1996 (age 30)
- Place of birth: Saitama, Japan
- Height: 1.72 m (5 ft 8 in)
- Position: Midfielder

Team information
- Current team: Nagoya Grampus
- Number: 41

Youth career
- Kashiwa Eagles TOR'82
- –2014: Omiya Ardija

College career
Years	Team	Apps	(Gls)
2015–2018	Meiji University		

Senior career*
Years	Team	Apps	(Gls)
2019–2022	Omiya Ardija	107	(6)
2023	Montedio Yamagata	39	(0)
2024–	Nagoya Grampus	24	(0)
- * Club domestic league appearances and goals as of 12 August 2026

Masahito Ono (小野 雅史, Ono Masahito; born 9 August 1996) is a Japanese professional footballer who plays as a midfielder for J1 League club Nagoya Grampus.
