= Hidemasa Koda =

Japanese footballer (born 2003)

Hidemasa Koda 甲田 英將
Personal information
- Full name: Hidemasa Koda
- Date of birth: 2 October 2003 (age 23)
- Place of birth: Yokkaichi, Mie, Japan
- Height: 1.68 m (5 ft 6 in)
- Position: Midfielder

Team information
- Current team: Nagoya Grampus
- Number: 19

Youth career
- Kawashima SSS
- –2021: Nagoya Grampus

Senior career*
Years	Team	Apps	(Gls)
2022–	Nagoya Grampus	28	(2)
2023	→ Tokyo Verdy (loan)	9	(0)
2024	→ Mito HollyHock (loan)	29	(2)
2025	→ Ehime FC (loan)	31	(2)

International career^{‡}
2019	Japan U16		
2021–	Japan U23	2	(1)
- * Club domestic league appearances and goals as of 12 August 2026 ‡ National team caps and goals as of 17:04, 23 February 2022 (UTC)

Hidemasa Koda (甲田 英將, Koda Hidemasa; born 2 October 2003), also known as Hide, is a Japanese footballer currently playing as a midfielder for J1 League club Nagoya Grampus.

== Early life ==
Koda was born in Yokkaichi, Mie, Japan.

== Career ==
Koda made his debut for Grampus on 23 February 2022 against Shimizu S-Pulse, coming on in the 83rd minute for Manabu Saitō.

== Career statistics ==
=== Club ===
As of 22 April 2026.

Appearances and goals by club, season and competition
Club	Season	League			National cup (Note: Includes Emperors Cup)		League cup (Note: Includes J.League Cup)		Total	
Club	Season	Division	Apps	Goals	Apps	Goals	Apps	Goals	Apps	Goals
Nagoya Grampus	2020	J1 League	0	0	0	0	0	0	0	0
Nagoya Grampus	2022	J1 League	7	0	0	0	5	0	12	0
Nagoya Grampus	2023	J1 League	2	0	1	0	4	0	7	0
Nagoya Grampus	2026	J1 (100)	9	1	0	0	0	0	9	1
Nagoya Grampus	Total		18	1	1	0	9	0	28	1
Tokyo Verdy (loan)	2023	J2 League	9	0	–		–		9	0
Mito HollyHock (loan)	2024	J2 League	29	2	1	0	–		30	2
Ehime FC (loan)	2025	J2 League	31	2	1	0	–		32	2
Career total			87	5	3	0	9	0	99	5
