= List of J1 League football transfers summer 2023 =

Transfer list

This is a list of J1 League transfers made during the summer transfer window of the 2023 season by each club. The transfer window opened between 21 July and 18 August.

== Albirex Niigata ==
=== Arrivals ===
Date	Position	Player	From	Type	Source
26 July 2023	FW	(Japan) Motoki Nagakura	(Japan) Thespakusatsu Gunma	Full	

=== Departures ===
Date	Position	Player	To	Type	Source
5 June 2023	MF	(Japan) Ryotaro Ito	(Belgium) Sint-Truiden	Full	

== Avispa Fukuoka ==
=== Arrivals ===
Date	Position	Player	From	Type	Source
17 July 2023	DF	(Japan) Masaya Tashiro	(Japan) Sagan Tosu	Full	

=== Departures ===
None

== Cerezo Osaka ==
=== Arrivals ===
Date	Position	Player	From	Type	Source
31 May 2023	DF	(Japan) Yusuke Maruhashi	(Thailand) BG Pathum United	Loan return	
7 July 2023	MF	(Japan) Haruki Arai	(Japan) FC Tiamo Hirakata	Loan	
23 July 2023	FW	(Japan) Ryo Watanabe	(Japan) Fujieda MYFC	Full	
28 July 2023	MF	(Japan) Masaya Shibayama	(Japan) Omiya Ardija	Full	

=== Departures ===
Date	Position	Player	To	Type	Source
21 July 2023	MF	(Japan) Hikaru Nakahara	(Japan) Tokyo Verdy	Loan	
21 July 2023	MF	(Japan) Kosei Okazawa	(Japan) FC Ryukyu	Loan	
21 July 2023	FW	(Japan) Mutsuki Kato	(Japan) Sanfrecce Hiroshima	Full	
24 July 2023	DF	(Japan) Riki Harakawa	(Japan) FC Tokyo	Loan	
9 August 2023	FW	(Japan) Ryuji Sawakami	(Japan) Fukushima United	Loan	
16 August 2023	DF	(Japan) Riku Matsuda	(Japan) Ventforet Kofu	Loan	

== FC Tokyo ==
=== Arrivals ===
Date	Position	Player	From	Type	Source
4 July 2023	DF	(Japan) Kosuke Shirai	(Japan) Kyoto Sanga	Full	
24 July 2023	DF	(Japan) Riki Harakawa	(Japan) Cerezo Osaka	Loan	
28 July 2023	MF	(Brazil) Jája Silva	(United Arab Emirates) Al-Nasr SC	Full	
17 August 2023	FW	(Japan) Keita Yamashita	(Japan) Shonan Bellmare	Loan return	

=== Departures ===
Date	Position	Player	To	Type	Source
8 June 2023	MF	(Brazil) Leandro		Contract terminated	
26 June 2023	DF	(Japan) Ryoya Ogawa	(Belgium) Sint-Truiden	Loan	
11 July 2023	DF	(Japan) Junya Suzuki	(Japan) FC Machida Zelvia	Full	
19 July 2023	MF	(Japan) Shuto Abe	(Belgium) RWD Molenbeek	Full	
28 July 2023	FW	(Japan) Kyosuke Tagawa	(Scotland) Hearts	Full	
1 August 2023	DF	(Japan) Renta Higashi	(Japan) SC Sagamihara	Loan	
2 August 2023	MF	(Japan) Hisatoshi Nishido	(Japan) JEF United Chiba	Loan	
14 August 2023	FW	(Japan) Leon Nozawa	(Japan) Matsumoto Yamaga	Loan	

== Gamba Osaka ==
=== Arrivals ===
Date	Position	Player	From	Type	Source
30 July 2023	FW	(Japan) Shoji Toyama	(Japan) Mito Hollyhock	Loan return	
8 August 2023	DF	(Japan) Shinya Nakano	(Japan) Sagan Tosu	Loan	
8 August 2023	GK	(Japan) Akinori Ichikawa	(Japan) Yokohama FC	Loan	

=== Departures ===
Date	Position	Player	To	Type	Source
30 June 2023	MF	(Japan) Rihito Yamamoto	(Belgium) Sint-Truiden	Loan	
1 August 2023	GK	(Japan) Kosei Tani	(Belgium) Dender	Loan	

== Hokkaido Consadole Sapporo ==
=== Arrivals ===
Date	Position	Player	From	Type	Source
16 August 2023	GK	(Japan) Shun Takagi	(Japan) Oita Trinita	Full	

=== Departures ===
Date	Position	Player	To	Type	Source
25 June 2023	MF	(Japan) Taika Nakashima	(Japan) Nagoya Grampus	Loan	
25 July 2023	GK	(South Korea) Gu Sung-yun	(Japan) Kyoto Sanga	Loan	
25 July 2023	MF	(Japan) Takuro Kaneko	(Croatia) Dinamo Zagreb	Loan	
27 July 2023	MF	(Japan) Hiromu Tanaka	(Japan) Fujieda MYFC	Loan	
17 August 2023	DF	(Japan) Daigo Nishi	(Japan) Iwate Grulla Morioka	Loan	

== Kashima Antlers ==
=== Arrivals ===
Date	Position	Player	From	Type	Source
25 July 2023	DF	(Japan) Hidehiro Sugai	(Japan) Ventforet Kofu	Full	
1 September 2023	MF	(Japan) Gaku Shibasaki		Free agent	

=== Departures ===
Date	Position	Player	To	Type	Source
3 July 2023	DF	(South Korea) Kim Min-tae	(Japan) Shonan Bellmare	Loan	
4 July 2023	FW	(Japan) Itsuki Someno	(Japan) Tokyo Verdy	Loan	
15 July 2023	DF	(Japan) Keigo Tsunemoto	(Switzerland) Servette FC	Full	
15 August 2023	MF	(Japan) Ryotaro Nakamura	(Japan) Ventforet Kofu	Loan	

== Kashiwa Reysol ==
=== Arrivals ===
Date	Position	Player	From	Type	Source
24 July 2023	DF	(Japan) Tomoya Inukai	(Japan) Urawa Reds	Loan	
21 August 2023	MF	(Japan) Yuto Yamada	(Japan) Tochigi SC	Loan return	

=== Departures ===
Date	Position	Player	To	Type	Source
30 June 2023	MF	(Japan) Keita Nakamura	(Japan) V-Varen Nagasaki	Full	
2 July 2023	FW	(Japan) Yugo Masukake	(Japan) Ehime FC	Loan	
23 August 2023	DF	(Japan) Takuma Otake	(Japan) Verspah Oita	Loan	

== Kawasaki Frontale ==
=== Arrivals ===
Date	Position	Player	From	Type	Source
8 August 2023	FW	(France) Bafétimbi Gomis	(Turkey) Galatasaray	Full	

=== Departures ===
Date	Position	Player	To	Type	Source
14 June 2023	MF	(Japan) Takatora Einaga	(Japan) Mito Hollyhock	Loan	
21 June 2023	MF	(Thailand) Chanathip Songkrasin	(Thailand) BG Pathum United	Full	
6 July 2023	MF	(Japan) Kazuki Kozuka	(South Korea) Suwon Bluewings	Full	
24 July 2023	FW	(Japan) Ten Miyagi	(Japan) Montedio Yamagata	Loan	

== Kyoto Sanga ==
=== Arrivals ===
Date	Position	Player	From	Type	Source
3 July 2023	FW	(Japan) Taichi Hara	(Spain) Alavés	Full	
25 July 2023	GK	(South Korea) Gu Sung-yun	(Japan) Hokkaido Consadole Sapporo	Loan	

=== Departures ===
Date	Position	Player	To	Type	Source
21 June 2023	MF	(Brazil) Alan Cariús		Released	
21 June 2023	MF	(Brazil) Paulinho	(Ukraine) FC Metalist Kharkiv	Loan return	
4 July 2023	DF	(Japan) Kosuke Shirai	(Japan) FC Tokyo	Full	
13 July 2023	DF	(Japan) Takahiro Iida	(Japan) Omiya Ardija	Loan	
13 July 2023	FW	(Nigeria) Origbaajo Ismaila	(Japan) Tochigi SC	Loan	
16 August 2023	FW	(Japan) Yudai Kimura	(Japan) Zweigen Kanazawa	Loan	
16 August 2023	GK	(New Zealand) Michael Woud	(Japan) Ventforet Kofu	Loan	

== Nagoya Grampus ==
=== Arrivals ===
Date	Position	Player	From	Type	Source
25 June 2023	FW	(Japan) Taika Nakashima	(Japan) Hokkaido Consadole Sapporo	Loan	
30 June 2023	FW	(Japan) Naoki Maeda	(Netherlands) FC Utrecht	Loan return	
26 July 2023	MF	(Japan) Tojiro Kubo	(Japan) Fujieda MYFC	Full	
3 August 2023	MF	(Japan) Tsukasa Morishima	(Japan) Sanfrecce Hiroshima	Full	

=== Departures ===
Date	Position	Player	To	Type	Source
12 June 2023	MF	(Japan) Hidemasa Koda	(Japan) Tokyo Verdy	Loan	
13 July 2023	MF	(Japan) Ryotaro Ishida	(Japan) Tochigi SC	Loan	
17 July 2023	GK	(Japan) John Higashi	(Japan) SC Sagamihara	Loan	
20 July 2023	FW	(Japan) Yuki Soma	(Portugal) Casa Pia	Loan extension	
1 August 2023	FW	(Brazil) Mateus Castro	(Saudi Arabia) Al Taawoun	Full	
3 August 2023	MF	(Japan) Kazuki Nagasawa	(Japan) Vegalta Sendai	Full	
7 August 2023	FW	(Brazil) Leonardo	(Japan) Fujieda MYFC	Full	
7 August 2023	MF	(Japan) Koki Toyoda	(Japan) Nagano Parceiro	Loan	

== Sagan Tosu ==
=== Arrivals ===
None

=== Departures ===
Date	Position	Player	To	Type	Source
6 July 2023	DF	(Japan) Dai Hirase	(Japan) Renofa Yamaguchi	Loan	
6 July 2023	FW	(Japan) Rio Nitta	(Austria) SKN St. Pölten	Full	
17 July 2023	DF	(Japan) Masaya Tashiro	(Japan) Avispa Fukuoka	Full	
3 August 2023	DF	(Japan) Daisuke Matsumoto	(Japan) Machida Zelvia	Full	
8 August 2023	DF	(Japan) Shinya Nakano	(Japan) Gamba Osaka	Loan	
29 August 2023	MF	(Japan) Reoto Kodama	(Portugal) AD Fafe	Full	

== Sanfrecce Hiroshima ==
=== Arrivals ===
Date	Position	Player	From	Type	Source
21 July 2023	FW	(Japan) Mutsuki Kato	(Japan) Cerezo Osaka	Full	
11 August 2023	MF	(Brazil) Marcos Júnior	(Japan) Yokohama F. Marinos	Full	

=== Departures ===
Date	Position	Player	To	Type	Source
7 July 2023	FW	(Japan) Shun Ayukawa	(Japan) Oita Trinita	Loan	
10 July 2023	MF	(Japan) Kodai Dohi	(Japan) FC Imabari	Loan	
3 August 2023	MF	(Japan) Tsukasa Morishima	(Japan) Nagoya Grampus	Full	

== Shonan Bellmare ==
=== Arrivals ===
Date	Position	Player	From	Type	Source
4 June 2023	MF	(Japan) Satoshi Tanaka	(Belgium) K.V. Kortrijk	Loan return	
3 July 2023	DF	(South Korea) Kim Min-tae	(Japan) Kashima Antlers	Loan	
13 July 2023	FW	(Japan) Akira Silvano Disaro	(Japan) Shimizu S-Pulse	Full	
17 August 2023	MF	(Japan) Sho Fukuda	(Japan) YSCC Yokohama	Full	

=== Departures ===
Date	Position	Player	To	Type	Source
22 June 2023	DF	(Japan) Toru Shibata	(Japan) Fukushima United FC	Loan	
29 June 2023	FW	(Japan) Shuto Machino	(Germany) Holstein Kiel	Full	
18 July 2023	MF	(Nigeria) Mikel Agu	(Japan) Giravanz Kitakyushu	Full	
16 August 2023	MF	(Japan) Ryota Nagaki	(Japan) Tokushima Vortis	Loan	
17 August 2023	FW	(Japan) Keita Yamashita	(Japan) FC Tokyo	Loan return	

== Urawa Reds ==
=== Arrivals ===
Date	Position	Player	From	Type	Source
1 June 2023	DF	(Japan) Yuta Miyamoto	(Belgium) KMSK Deinze	Loan return	
3 July 2023	FW	(Japan) Hiroki Abe	(Spain) Barça B	Full	
24 July 2023	MF	(Thailand) Ekanit Panya	(Thailand) Muangthong United	Loan	
25 July 2023	MF	(Japan) Shoya Nakajima	(Turkey) Antalyaspor	Full	

=== Departures ===
Date	Position	Player	To	Type	Source
3 July 2023	MF	(Japan) Kai Matsuzaki	(Japan) Vegalta Sendai	Loan	
19 July 2023	MF	(Sweden) David Moberg Karlsson	(Greece) Aris Thessaloniki	Loan	
24 July 2023	DF	(Japan) Tomoya Inukai	(Japan) Kashiwa Reysol	Loan	
6 August 2023	GK	(Japan) Zion Suzuki	(Belgium) Sint-Truiden	Loan	

== Vissel Kobe ==
=== Arrivals ===
Date	Position	Player	From	Type	Source
5 June 2023	MF	(Japan) Mitsuki Hidaka	(Spain) CD Atlético Paso	Loan return	
16 August 2023	MF	(Japan) Mizuki Arai	(Japan) Yokohama FC	Loan	
2 September 2023	MF	(Hungary) Bálint Vécsei		Free agent	
3 September 2023	MF	(Spain) Juan Mata		Free agent	

=== Departures ===
Date	Position	Player	To	Type	Source
1 July 2023	MF	(Spain) Andrés Iniesta		Released	
10 July 2023	FW	(Montenegro) Stefan Mugoša	(South Korea) Incheon United	Full	
20 July 2023	DF	(Japan) Shogo Terasaka	(Japan) FC Ryukyu	Loan	
28 July 2023	MF	(Spain) Sergi Samper	(Spain) FC Andorra	Full	
16 August 2023	MF	(Japan) Toya Izumi	(Japan) Montedio Yamagata	Loan	
8 September 2023	FW	(Japan) Niina Tominaga	(Japan) Kamatamare Sanuki	Loan	

== Yokohama F. Marinos ==
=== Arrivals ===
Date	Position	Player	From	Type	Source
24 July 2023	DF	(Japan) Hijiri Kato	(Japan) V-Varen Nagasaki	Full	
1 August 2023	MF	(South Korea) Nam Tae-hee	(Qatar) Al-Duhail SC	Full	

=== Departures ===
Date	Position	Player	To	Type	Source
13 July 2023	DF	(Japan) Tomoki Iwata	(Scotland) Celtic	Full	
27 July 2023	MF	(Japan) Joel Chima Fujita	(Belgium) Sint-Truiden	Full	
30 July 2023	MF	(Japan) Takuto Kimura	(Japan) Ehime FC	Loan	
11 August 2023	MF	(Brazil) Marcos Júnior	(Japan) Sanfrecce Hiroshima	Full	

== Yokohama FC ==
=== Arrivals ===
Date	Position	Player	From	Type	Source
27 June 2023	GK	(Japan) Masaki Endo	(Japan) Mito Hollyhock	Loan return	

=== Departures ===
Date	Position	Player	To	Type	Source
4 July 2023	FW	(Japan) Koki Ogawa	(Netherlands) NEC Nijmegen	Loan	
11 July 2023	FW	(Japan) Kazuyoshi Miura	(Portugal) Oliveirense	Loan extension	
2 August 2023	FW	(Brazil) Saulo Mineiro	(Brazil) Ceará	Full	
8 August 2023	GK	(Japan) Akinori Ichikawa	(Japan) Gamba Osaka	Loan	
16 August 2023	MF	(Japan) Mizuki Arai	(Japan) Vissel Kobe	Loan	
16 August 2023	MF	(Japan) Tatsuya Hasegawa	(Japan) Tokyo Verdy	Loan	

== See also ==
- List of J1 League football transfers winter 2022–23
- List of J2 League football transfers summer 2023
- List of J3 League football transfers summer 2023
