= List of J2 League football transfers summer 2023 =

Transfer list

This is a list of J2 League transfers made during the summer transfer window of the 2023 season by each club. The transfer window opened from 21 July to 18 August.

== Blaublitz Akita ==
=== Arrivals ===
None

=== Departures ===
None

== Fagiano Okayama ==
=== Arrivals ===
Date	Position	Player	From	Type	Source
13 July 2023	MF	(Japan) Rui Sueyoshi	(Japan) JEF United Chiba	Loan	

=== Departures ===
Date	Position	Player	To	Type	Source
25 July 2023	GK	(Japan) Rissei Taniguchi	(Japan) Reilac Shiga FC	Loan	
6 August 2023	MF	(Japan) Tatsuhiko Noguchi	(Japan) Kataller Toyama	Loan	
14 August 2023	MF	(Japan) Kodai Sano	(Netherlands) NEC Nijmegen	Full	

== Fujieda MYFC ==
=== Arrivals ===
Date	Position	Player	From	Type	Source
1 July 2023	FW	(Brazil) Anderson	(Brazil) Moto Club	Full	
27 July 2023	FW	(Japan) Kazaki Nakagawa	(Japan) FC Imabari	Full	
27 July 2023	MF	(Japan) Hiromu Tanaka	(Japan) Hokkaido Consadole Sapporo	Loan	
7 August 2023	MF	(Japan) Kento Nishiya	(Japan) FC Osaka	Loan	
7 August 2023	FW	(Brazil) Leonardo	(Japan) Nagoya Grampus	Full	
7 August 2023	DF	(Japan) So Nakagawa	(Japan) Júbilo Iwata	Loan	

=== Departures ===
Date	Position	Player	To	Type	Source
23 July 2023	FW	(Japan) Ryo Watanabe	(Japan) Cerezo Osaka	Full	
26 July 2023	MF	(Japan) Tojiro Kubo	(Japan) Nagoya Grampus	Full	
16 August 2023	FW	(Japan) Takato Nakai	(Japan) Verspah Oita	Loan	

== Iwaki FC ==
=== Arrivals ===
Date	Position	Player	From	Type	Source
28 July 2023	MF	(Brazil) Nélson Henrique	(Portugal) S.C. Praiense	Loan	

=== Departures ===
None

== JEF United Chiba ==
=== Arrivals ===
Date	Position	Player	From	Type	Source
17 July 2023	FW	(Brazil) Dudu	(Japan) FC Imabari	Full	
2 August 2023	MF	(Japan) Hisatoshi Nishido	(Japan) FC Tokyo	Loan	

=== Departures ===
Date	Position	Player	To	Type	Source
13 July 2023	MF	(Japan) Rui Sueyoshi	(Japan) Fagiano Okayama	Loan	
30 July 2023	FW	(Brazil) Matheus Saldanha	(Serbia) FK Partizan	Loan	
18 August 2023	FW	(Japan) Keita Buwanika	(Japan) Mito Hollyhock	Loan	

== Júbilo Iwata ==
=== Arrivals ===
None

=== Departures ===
Date	Position	Player	To	Type	Source
13 July 2023	DF	(Japan) Norimichi Yamamoto	(Japan) Zweigen Kanazawa	Loan	
7 August 2023	DF	(Japan) So Nakagawa	(Japan) Fujieda MYFC	Loan	

== Machida Zelvia ==
=== Arrivals ===
Date	Position	Player	From	Type	Source
6 July 2023	MF	(Chile) Byron Vásquez	(Japan) Tokyo Verdy	Full	
11 July 2023	DF	(Japan) Junya Suzuki	(Japan) FC Tokyo	Full	
3 August 2023	DF	(Japan) Daisuke Matsumoto	(Japan) Sagan Tosu	Full	
5 September 2023	FW	(Brazil) Ademilson	(China) Wuhan Three Towns	Full	

=== Departures ===
Date	Position	Player	To	Type	Source
28 June 2023	DF	(Japan) Soichiro Fukaminato	(Japan) Kamatamare Sanuki	Loan	
4 July 2023	MF	(Japan) Atsushi Kurokawa	(Japan) Omiya Ardija	Loan	
18 July 2023	MF	(Japan) Leo Takae	(Japan) Montedio Yamagata	Full	
27 July 2023	MF	(Japan) Kota Fukatsu	(Japan) Iwate Grulla Morioka	Full	
6 August 2023	MF	(Japan) Ken Higuchi	(Japan) Okinawa SV	Full	
8 August 2023	DF	(Spain) Carlos Gutiérrez	(Japan) V-Varen Nagasaki	Full	
18 August 2023	MF	(Japan) Kazuma Yamaguchi	(Japan) Montedio Yamagata	Loan return	

== Mito Hollyhock ==
=== Arrivals ===
Date	Position	Player	From	Type	Source
7 June 2023	DF	(Japan) Keita Matsuda	(Japan) FC Osaka	Loan return	
14 June 2023	MF	(Japan) Takatora Einaga	(Japan) Kawasaki Frontale	Loan	
18 August 2023	FW	(Japan) Keita Buwanika	(Japan) JEF United Chiba	Loan	

=== Departures ===
Date	Position	Player	To	Type	Source
27 June 2023	GK	(Japan) Masaki Endo	(Japan) Yokohama FC	Loan return	
29 June 2023	GK	(Japan) John Higashi	(Japan) Nagoya Grampus	Loan return	
17 July 2023	MF	(Japan) Reo Yasunaga	(Japan) Matsumoto Yamaga	Loan	
30 July 2023	FW	(Japan) Shoji Toyama	(Japan) Gamba Osaka	Loan return	

== Montedio Yamagata ==
Date	Position	Player	From	Type	Source
18 July 2023	MF	(Japan) Leo Takae	(Japan) Machida Zelvia	Full	
24 July 2023	FW	(Japan) Ten Miyagi	(Japan) Kawasaki Frontale	Loan	
16 August 2023	MF	(Japan) Toya Izumi	(Japan) Vissel Kobe	Loan	

=== Departures ===
Date	Position	Player	To	Type	Source
25 July 2023	MF	(Japan) Taiki Kato	(Japan) Zweigen Kanazawa	Full	

== Oita Trinita ==
=== Arrivals ===
Date	Position	Player	From	Type	Source
7 July 2023	FW	(Japan) Shun Ayukawa	(Japan) Sanfrecce Hiroshima	Loan	

=== Departures ===
Date	Position	Player	To	Type	Source
16 August 2023	GK	(Japan) Shun Takagi	(Japan) Hokkaido Consadole Sapporo	Full	

== Omiya Ardija ==
=== Arrivals ===
Date	Position	Player	From	Type	Source
4 July 2023	MF	(Japan) Atsushi Kurokawa	(Japan) Machida Zelvia	Loan	
6 July 2023	FW	(Poland) Jakub Świerczok	(Poland) Zagłębie Lubin	Full	
13 July 2023	DF	(Japan) Takahiro Iida	(Japan) Kyoto Sanga	Loan	
28 July 2023	DF	(Brazil) Kaique Mafaldo	(Japan) V-Varen Nagasaki	Loan	

=== Departures ===
Date	Position	Player	To	Type	Source
30 June 2023	MF	(Japan) Kanji Okunuki	(Germany) 1. FC Nürnberg	Full	
28 July 2023	MF	(Japan) Masaya Shibayama	(Japan) Cerezo Osaka	Full	

== Renofa Yamaguchi ==
=== Arrivals ===
Date	Position	Player	From	Type	Source
6 July 2023	DF	(Japan) Dai Hirase	(Japan) Sagan Tosu	Loan	
18 July 2023	FW	(Brazil) Sílvio	(Indonesia) Persikabo 1973	Full	
25 July 2023	DF	(South Korea) Kim Byeom-yong	(South Korea) Gyeongnam FC	Full	
17 August 2023	MF	(Japan) Hikaru Naruoka	(Japan) Shimizu S-Pulse	Loan	

=== Departures ===
Date	Position	Player	To	Type	Source
3 August 2023	DF	(Japan) Daisuke Matsumoto	(Japan) Sagan Tosu	Loan return	
15 August 2023	DF	(Japan) Reo Kunimoto	(Japan) Tegevajaro Miyazaki	Loan	

== Roasso Kumamoto ==
=== Arrivals ===
Date	Position	Player	From	Type	Source
6 July 2023	DF	(Japan) Takumi Sakai	(Japan) FC Osaka	Loan	

=== Departures ===
None

== Shimizu S-Pulse ==
=== Arrivals ===
Date	Position	Player	From	Type	Source
30 June 2023	MF	(Japan) Teruki Hara	(Switzerland) Grasshopper Club Zürich	Loan return	
13 July 2023	MF	(Japan) Yuito Suzuki	(France) Strasbourg	Loan return	

=== Departures ===
Date	Position	Player	To	Type	Source
13 July 2023	FW	(Japan) Akira Silvano Disaro	(Japan) Shonan Bellmare	Full	
19 July 2023	FW	(Japan) Kanta Chiba	(Japan) FC Imabari	Loan	
30 July 2023	FW	(Japan) Sena Saito	(Japan) SC Sagamihara	Loan	
12 August 2023	MF	(Japan) Yuito Suzuki	(Denmark) Brøndby IF	Full	
17 August 2023	MF	(Japan) Hikaru Naruoka	(Japan) Renofa Yamaguchi	Loan	

== Thespakusatsu Gunma ==
=== Arrivals ===
Date	Position	Player	From	Type	Source
27 July 2023	MF	(Japan) Ryuji Sugimoto	(Japan) Tokyo Verdy	Loan	

=== Departures ===
Date	Position	Player	To	Type	Source
9 July 2023	MF	(Japan) Yu Tabei	(Japan) Reilac Shiga	Loan	
19 July 2023	MF	(Japan) Yuzo Iwakami	(Japan) SC Sagamihara	Loan	
26 July 2023	FW	(Japan) Motoki Nagakura	(Japan) Albirex Niigata	Full	

== Tochigi SC ==
=== Arrivals ===
Date	Position	Player	From	Type	Source
13 July 2023	MF	(Japan) Ryotaro Ishida	(Japan) Nagoya Grampus	Loan	
13 July 2023	DF	(Brazil) Rafael Costa	(Brazil) Anápolis	Full	
13 July 2023	FW	(Nigeria) Origbaajo Ismaila	(Japan) Kyoto Sanga	Loan	
4 August 2023	FW	(Brazil) Leandro Pereira	(Iran) Persepolis	Full	

=== Departures ===
Date	Position	Player	To	Type	Source
17 July 2023	FW	(Japan) Yuji Senuma	(Japan) SC Sagamihara	Loan	
10 August 2023	DF	(Japan) Yukuto Omoya	(Japan) Reilac Shiga FC	Loan	
17 August 2023	FW	(Japan) Masato Igarashi	(Japan) Reilac Shiga FC	Loan	
21 August 2023	MF	(Japan) Yuto Yamada	(Japan) Kashiwa Reysol	Loan return	

== Tokushima Vortis ==
=== Arrivals ===
Date	Position	Player	From	Type	Source
16 August 2023	MF	(Japan) Ryota Nagaki	(Japan) Shonan Bellmare	Loan	

=== Departures ===
Date	Position	Player	To	Type	Source
7 July 2023	FW	(Japan) Wadi Ibrahim Suzuki	(Spain) Girona FC B	Loan	
19 July 2023	FW	(Japan) Kanta Chiba	(Japan) Shimizu S-Pulse	Loan return	
21 July 2023	DF	(Brazil) Cacá	(Brazil) CA Paranaense	Loan	
1 August 2023	FW	(Nigeria) Oriola Sunday	(Japan) Vanraure Hachinohe	Loan	
6 September 2023	MF	(Japan) Rin Morita	(Japan) Nara Club	Loan	

== Tokyo Verdy ==
=== Arrivals ===
Date	Position	Player	From	Type	Source
4 July 2023	FW	(Japan) Itsuki Someno	(Japan) Kashima Antlers	Loan	
21 July 2023	MF	(Japan) Hikaru Nakahara	(Japan) Cerezo Osaka	Loan	
16 August 2023	MF	(Japan) Tatsuya Hasegawa	(Japan) Yokohama FC	Loan	

=== Departures ===
Date	Position	Player	To	Type	Source
6 July 2023	MF	(Chile) Byron Vásquez	(Japan) Machida Zelvia	Full	
19 July 2023	FW	(Germany) Mario Engels	(Netherlands) Heracles Almelo	Full	
24 July 2023	MF	(Japan) Koken Kato	(Japan) AC Nagano Parceiro	Full	
27 July 2023	MF	(Japan) Ryuji Sugimoto	(Japan) Thespakusatsu Gunma	Loan	
28 July 2023	MF	(Japan) Rikuto Hashimoto	(Japan) YSCC Yokohama	Loan	
10 August 2023	FW	(Japan) Toyofumi Sakano	(Japan) FC Imabari	Full	

== V-Varen Nagasaki ==
=== Arrivals ===
Date	Position	Player	From	Type	Source
30 June 2023	MF	(Japan) Keita Nakamura	(Japan) Kashiwa Reysol	Full	
12 July 2023	MF	(Brazil) Marcos Guilherme	(Russia) FC Khimki	Full	
8 August 2023	DF	(Spain) Carlos Gutiérrez	(Japan) Machida Zelvia	Full	
17 August 2023	MF	(Brazil) Matheus Jesus	(Brazil) Corinthians	Full	

=== Departures ===
Date	Position	Player	To	Type	Source
24 July 2023	DF	(Japan) Hijiri Kato	(Japan) Yokohama F. Marinos	Full	
24 July 2023	FW	(Japan) Ten Miyagi	(Japan) Kawasaki Frontale	Loan return	
28 July 2023	DF	(Brazil) Kaique Mafaldo	(Japan) Omiya Ardija	Loan	
2 August 2023	FW	(Brazil) Cristiano da Silva	(Japan) Ventforet Kofu	Loan	
15 August 2023	MF	(Japan) Seiya Satsukida	(Japan) Reilac Shiga FC	Loan	

== Vegalta Sendai ==
=== Arrivals ===
Date	Position	Player	From	Type	Source
3 July 2023	MF	(Japan) Kai Matsuzaki	(Japan) Urawa Red Diamonds	Loan	
31 July 2023	MF	(Japan) Manabu Saitō	(Australia) Newcastle Jets	Full	
3 August 2023	MF	(Japan) Kazuki Nagasawa	(Japan) Nagoya Grampus	Full	

=== Departures ===
None

== Ventforet Kofu ==
=== Arrivals ===
Date	Position	Player	From	Type	Source
2 August 2023	FW	(Brazil) Cristiano da Silva	(Japan) V-Varen Nagasaki	Loan	
15 August 2023	MF	(Japan) Ryotaro Nakamura	(Japan) Kashima Antlers	Loan	
16 August 2023	GK	(New Zealand) Michael Woud	(Japan) Kyoto Sanga	Loan	
16 August 2023	DF	(Japan) Riku Matsuda	(Japan) Cerezo Osaka	Loan	
8 September 2023	FW	(Brazil) Lucas Macedo	(Portugal) S.C. Praiense	Full	

=== Departures ===
Date	Position	Player	To	Type	Source
10 July 2023	MF	(Japan) Kodai Dohi	(Japan) Sanfrecce Hiroshima	Loan return	
25 July 2023	DF	(Japan) Hidehiro Sugai	(Japan) Kashima Antlers	Full	

== Zweigen Kanazawa ==
=== Arrivals ===
Date	Position	Player	From	Type	Source
13 July 2023	DF	(Japan) Norimichi Yamamoto	(Japan) Jubilo Iwata	Loan	
25 July 2023	MF	(Japan) Taiki Kato	(Japan) Montedio Yamagata	Full	
16 August 2023	FW	(Japan) Yudai Kimura	(Japan) Kyoto Sanga	Loan	

=== Departures ===
Date	Position	Player	To	Type	Source
4 August 2023	DF	(Japan) Kengo Kuroki	(Japan) FC Osaka	Loan	

== See also ==
- List of J1 League football transfers summer 2023
- List of J2 League football transfers winter 2022–23
- List of J3 League football transfers summer 2023
