= List of J3 League football transfers summer 2023 =

Transfer list

This is a list of J3 League transfers made during the summer transfer window of the 2023 season by each club. The transfer window opened between 21 July and 18 August.

== Azul Claro Numazu ==
=== Arrivals ===
Date	Position	Player	From	Type	Source
3 August 2023	FW	(Japan) Kengo Kawamata		Free agent	
9 September 2023	DF	(Japan) Koki Inoue	(Japan) Reilac Shiga FC	Loan return	

=== Departures ===
Date	Position	Player	To	Type	Source
28 July 2023	DF	(Japan) Koki Inoue	(Japan) Reilac Shiga FC	Loan	
10 August 2023	DF	(Japan) Haruto Kawamae	(Japan) Ituano FC Yokohama	Loan	

== Ehime FC ==
=== Arrivals ===
Date	Position	Player	From	Type	Source
2 July 2023	FW	(Japan) Yugo Masukake	(Japan) Kashiwa Reysol	Loan	
30 July 2023	MF	(Japan) Takuto Kimura	(Japan) Yokohama F. Marinos	Loan	

=== Departures ===
Date	Position	Player	To	Type	Source
23 August 2023	DF	(Japan) Takuma Otake	(Japan) Kashiwa Reysol	Loan return	

== Fukushima United ==
=== Arrivals ===
Date	Position	Player	From	Type	Source
22 June 2023	DF	(Japan) Toru Shibata	(Japan) Shonan Bellmare	Loan	
9 August 2023	FW	(Japan) Ryuji Sawakami	(Japan) Cerezo Osaka	Loan	
8 September 2023	GK	(Japan) Taku Kamikawa	(Japan) Tokyo United FC	Loan return	

=== Departures ===
Date	Position	Player	To	Type	Source
23 August 2023	GK	(Japan) Taku Kamikawa	(Japan) Tokyo United FC	Loan	

== Gainare Tottori ==
=== Arrivals ===
Date	Position	Player	From	Type	Source
7 September 2023	FW	(Japan) Yusuke Yoshii		Free agent	

=== Departures ===
Date	Position	Player	To	Type	Source
9 August 2023	FW	(Japan) Ryuji Sawakami	(Japan) Cerezo Osaka	Loan return	

== FC Gifu ==
=== Arrivals ===
None

=== Departures ===
Date	Position	Player	To	Type	Source
18 July 2023	MF	(Japan) Akira Yamauchi	(Japan) Reilac Shiga FC	Loan	

== Giravanz Kitakyushu ==
=== Arrivals ===
Date	Position	Player	From	Type	Source
18 July 2023	MF	(Nigeria) Mikel Agu	(Japan) Shonan Bellmare	Full	
16 August 2023	FW	(Brazil) Eduardo Melo	(Brazil) Criciúma	Loan	
18 August 2023	FW	(Nigeria) Ikechukwu Eboko	(Nigeria) Enugu Rangers	Full	

=== Departures ===
Date	Position	Player	To	Type	Source
22 August 2023	DF	(Japan) Shinnosuke Ito	(Japan) Fukuyama City FC	Loan	

== FC Imabari ==
=== Arrivals ===
Date	Position	Player	From	Type	Source
10 July 2023	MF	(Japan) Kodai Dohi	(Japan) Sanfrecce Hiroshima	Loan	
19 July 2023	FW	(Japan) Kanta Chiba	(Japan) Shimizu S-Pulse	Loan	
10 August 2023	FW	(Japan) Toyofumi Sakano	(Japan) Tokyo Verdy	Full	
5 September 2023	FW	(Brazil) Vinícius Araújo	(Qatar) Umm Salal SC	Full	

=== Departures ===
Date	Position	Player	To	Type	Source
17 July 2023	FW	(Brazil) Dudu	(Japan) JEF United Chiba	Full	
27 July 2023	FW	(Japan) Kazaki Nakagawa	(Japan) Fujieda MYFC	Full	
6 September 2023	MF	(Japan) Haruki Matsui	(Japan) FC Maruyasu Okazaki	Loan	

== Iwate Grulla Morioka ==
=== Arrivals ===
Date	Position	Player	From	Type	Source
27 July 2023	MF	(Japan) Kota Fukatsu	(Japan) Machida Zelvia	Full	
15 August 2023	DF	(Japan) Daisuke Nasu		Free agent	
17 August 2023	DF	(Japan) Daigo Nishi	(Japan) Hokkaido Consadole Sapporo	Loan	

=== Departures ===
Date	Position	Player	To	Type	Source
7 August 2023	MF	(Japan) Shunji Masuda	(Japan) SC Sagamihara	Loan	

== Kagoshima United ==
=== Arrivals ===
None

=== Departures ===
None

== Kamatamare Sanuki ==
=== Arrivals ===
Date	Position	Player	From	Type	Source
28 June 2023	DF	(Japan) Soichiro Fukaminato	(Japan) Machida Zelvia	Loan	
3 July 2023	FW	(Japan) Shota Kawanishi	(Japan) Kataller Toyama	Loan	
8 September 2023	FW	(Japan) Niina Tominaga	(Japan) Vissel Kobe	Loan	

=== Departures ===
None

== Kataller Toyama ==
=== Arrivals ===
Date	Position	Player	From	Type	Source
6 August 2023	MF	(Japan) Tatsuhiko Noguchi	(Japan) Kataller Toyama	Loan	

=== Departures ===
Date	Position	Player	To	Type	Source
3 July 2023	FW	(Japan) Shota Kawanishi	(Japan) Kamatamare Sanuki	Loan	
6 August 2023	DF	(Japan) Daichi Omori		Contract terminated by mutual consent	

== Matsumoto Yamaga ==
=== Arrivals ===
Date	Position	Player	From	Type	Source
17 July 2023	MF	(Japan) Reo Yasunaga	(Japan) Mito Hollyhock	Loan	
14 August 2023	FW	(Japan) Leon Nozawa	(Japan) FC Tokyo	Loan	
18 August 2023	MF	(Japan) Kazuma Yamaguchi	(Japan) Machida Zelvia	Loan return	

=== Departures ===
Date	Position	Player	To	Type	Source
21 August 2023	DF	(Japan) Kojiro Shinohara	(Japan) Vonds Ichihara	Full	
25 August 2023	DF	(Japan) Jiyo Ninomiya	(Japan) Veroskronos Tsuno	Loan	

== Nagano Parceiro ==
=== Arrivals ===
Date	Position	Player	From	Type	Source
24 July 2023	MF	(Japan) Koken Kato	(Japan) Tokyo Verdy	Full	
7 August 2023	MF	(Japan) Koki Toyoda	(Japan) Nagoya Grampus	Loan	

=== Departures ===
Date	Position	Player	To	Type	Source
6 July 2023	MF	(Japan) Arima Aoki		Contract terminated	
19 October 2023	GK	(Japan) Ryu Nugraha	(Japan) BTOP Hokkaido	Loan	

== Nara Club ==
=== Arrivals ===
Date	Position	Player	From	Type	Source
3 August 2023	DF	(Japan) Kei Ikoma	(Japan) FC Tiamo Hirakata	Loan	
6 September 2023	MF	(Japan) Rin Morita	(Japan) Tokushima Vortis	Loan	

=== Departures ===
Date	Position	Player	To	Type	Source
14 August 2023	DF	(Japan) Ryotaro Hiramatsu	(Japan) Fukuyama City FC	Loan	

== FC Osaka ==
=== Arrivals ===
Date	Position	Player	From	Type	Source
26 July 2023	MF	(Japan) Hayata Komatsu	(South Korea) Gyeongju KHNP	Full	
1 August 2023	DF	(Japan) Takuma Hamasaki		Free agent	
4 August 2023	DF	(Japan) Kengo Kuroki	(Japan) Zweigen Kanazawa	Loan	
9 August 2023	MF	(Japan) Takuya Matsuura		Free agent	
14 August 2023	FW	(Brazil) Gustavo	(Brazil) Avaí	Loan	
26 August 2023	FW	(Brazil) Erverson	(Qatar) Al-Mesaimeer	Full	

=== Departures ===
Date	Position	Player	To	Type	Source
7 June 2023	DF	(Japan) Keita Matsuda	(Japan) Mito Hollyhock	Loan return	
6 July 2023	DF	(Japan) Takumi Sakai	(Japan) Roasso Kumamoto	Loan	
26 July 2023	FW	(Brazil) João Victor	(Brazil) Ceará	Loan return	
26 July 2023	MF	(Brazil) Maykon Douglas	(Brazil) Vitória	Loan return	
27 July 2023	FW	(Japan) Talla Ndao	(Japan) Maruyasu Okazaki	Loan	
7 August 2023	MF	(Japan) Kento Nishiya	(Japan) Fujieda MYFC	Loan	
17 August 2023	FW	(Brazil) Efrain Rintaro	(Japan) Veertien Mie	Loan	
17 August 2023	FW	(Cameroon) Jean Marie Dongou		Contract terminated by mutual consent	

== FC Ryukyu ==
=== Arrivals ===
Date	Position	Player	From	Type	Source
20 July 2023	DF	(Japan) Shogo Terasaka	(Japan) Vissel Kobe	Loan	
21 July 2023	MF	(Japan) Kosei Okazawa	(Japan) Cerezo Osaka	Loan	

=== Departures ===
None

== SC Sagamihara ==
=== Arrivals ===
Date	Position	Player	From	Type	Source
17 July 2023	GK	(Japan) John Higashi	(Japan) Nagoya Grampus	Loan	
17 July 2023	FW	(Japan) Yuji Senuma	(Japan) Tochigi SC	Loan	
19 July 2023	MF	(Japan) Yuzo Iwakami	(Japan) Thespakusatsu Gunma	Loan	
30 July 2023	FW	(Japan) Sena Saito	(Japan) Shimizu S-Pulse	Loan	

=== Departures ===
Date	Position	Player	To	Type	Source
20 August 2023	MF	(Japan) Keisuke Ito	(Japan) Tochigi City FC	Loan	
25 August 2023	MF	(Japan) Kaito Satori	(Japan) Okinawa SV	Loan	

== Tegevajaro Miyazaki ==
=== Arrivals ===
Date	Position	Player	From	Type	Source
15 August 2023	DF	(Japan) Reo Kunimoto	(Japan) Renofa Yamaguchi	Loan	

=== Departures ===
Date	Position	Player	To	Type	Source
10 August 2023	MF	(Japan) Haruki Shinjo	(Japan) Arterivo Wakayama	Loan	

== Vanraure Hachinohe ==
=== Arrivals ===
Date	Position	Player	From	Type	Source
1 August 2023	FW	(Nigeria) Oriola Sunday	(Japan) Tokushima Vortis	Loan	

=== Departures ===
None

== YSCC Yokohama ==
=== Arrivals ===
Date	Position	Player	From	Type	Source
28 July 2023	MF	(Japan) Rikuto Hashimoto	(Japan) Tokyo Verdy	Loan	

=== Departures ===
Date	Position	Player	To	Type	Source
17 August 2023	MF	(Japan) Sho Fukuda	(Japan) Shonan Bellmare	Full	
25 August 2023	FW	(Japan) Yusuke Yoshii		Contract terminated by mutual consent	

== See also ==
- List of J1 League football transfers summer 2023
- List of J2 League football transfers summer 2023
- List of J3 League football transfers winter 2022-23
