= 2023 JEF United Chiba season =

JEF United Chiba
2023 season
- Chairman: Akira Shimada
- Manager: Yoshiyuki Kobayashi
- Stadium: Fukuda Denshi Arena
- J2 League: 15th
- Emperor's Cup: Second round
- All statistics correct as of 13 May 2023.

The 2023 season was JEF United Chiba's 77th season in existence and the club's 14th consecutive season in the second division of Japanese football. In addition to the domestic league, JEF United Chiba participated in this season's edition of the Emperor's Cup.

== Players ==
=== First-team squad ===
As of 16 May 2023.

Note: Flags indicate national team as defined under FIFA eligibility rules; some limited exceptions apply. Players may hold more than one non-FIFA nationality.

No.	Pos.	Nation	Player
1	GK	JPN	Shota Arai (vice-captain)
2	MF	JPN	Issei Takahashi
4	MF	JPN	Taishi Taguchi (vice-captain)
5	MF	JPN	Yusuke Kobayashi
6	DF	JPN	Ikki Arai (vice-captain)
8	MF	JPN	Koya Kazama
9	FW	JPN	Hiroto Goya
10	MF	JPN	Tomoya Miki (vice-captain)
11	DF	JPN	Koki Yonekura
13	DF	JPN	Daisuke Suzuki (captain)
14	MF	JPN	Naoki Tsubaki
16	FW	JPN	Kazuki Tanaka (on loan from Kyoto Sanga)
17	MF	JPN	Takaki Fukumitsu
18	MF	JPN	Andrew Kumagai
20	FW	JPN	Toshiyuki Takagi
22	DF	JPN	Shogo Sasaki

No.	Pos.	Nation	Player
23	GK	JPN	Ryota Suzuki
24	DF	JPN	Shuntaro Yaguchi
25	MF	JPN	Rui Sueyoshi
26	DF	JPN	Shunsuke Nishikubo
28	MF	JPN	Tomoya Shinohara
31	GK	JPN	Sota Matsubara
33	GK	JPN	Issei Kondo
36	DF	JPN	Riku Matsuda
37	FW	JPN	Keita Buwanika
39	FW	JPN	Ryuta Shimmyo
40	DF	BRA	Mendes
41	FW	JPN	Hiiro Komori
48	DF	JPN	Soshiro Tanida ^{Type 2}
52	DF	JPN	Ryota Kuboniwa ^{DSP}
67	MF	JPN	Masaru Hidaka

=== Out on loan ===
Note: Flags indicate national team as defined under FIFA eligibility rules; some limited exceptions apply. Players may hold more than one non-FIFA nationality.

No.	Pos.	Nation	Player
—	FW	BRA	Saldanha (at Neftçi Baku until 31 December 2023)
—	FW	JPN	Raito Saito (at ReinMeer Aomori until 31 January 2024)

No.	Pos.	Nation	Player
—	FW	JPN	Solomon Sakuragawa (at Fagiano Okayama until 31 January 2024)
—	FW	JPN	Taichi Sakuma (at Vanraure Hachinohe until 31 January 2024)

== Transfers ==
Transfers in
Join on	Pos.	Player	Moving from	Transfer type
16 May	DF	(Brazil) Mendes	–	Free transfer
Pre-season	GK	(Japan) Issei Kondo	(Japan) Hosei University	Free transfer
Pre-season	DF	(Japan) Riku Matsuda	(Japan) Zweigen Kanazawa	Full transfer
Pre-season	DF	(Japan) Kazuki Tanaka	(Japan) Kyoto Sanga	Loan transfer
Pre-season	DF	(Japan) Shuntaro Yaguchi	JEF United Chiba U18	Promotion
Pre-season	MF	(Japan) Naoki Tsubaki	(Japan) Yokohama F. Marinos	Full transfer
Pre-season	MF	(Japan) Masaru Hidaka	(Japan) Iwaki FC	Full transfer
Pre-season	FW	(Japan) Hiroto Goya	(Japan) Oita Trinita	Full transfer
Pre-season	FW	(Japan) Hiiro Komori	(Japan) Niigata University HW	Free transfer
Pre-season	FW	(Japan) Ryuta Shimmyo	JEF United Chiba U18	Promotion

Transfers out
Leave on	Pos.	Player	Moving to	Transfer type
13 Mar	DF	(Japan) Shuto Tanabe	(Japan) JEF United Chiba	Loan cancellation
Pre-season	DF	(South Korea) Jang Min-gyu	(Japan) Machida Zelvia	Full transfer
Pre-season	DF	(Brazil) Daniel Alves	–	Contract expiration
Pre-season	MF	(Japan) Yosuke Akiyama	(Japan) Vegalta Sendai	Loan expiration
Pre-season	MF	(Japan) Shuto Kojima	(Japan) YSCC Yokohama	Free transfer
Pre-season	FW	(Brazil) Saldanha	(Azerbaijan) Neftçi Baku	Loan transfer
Pre-season	FW	(Japan) Solomon Sakuragawa	(Japan) Fagiano Okayama	Loan transfer
Pre-season	FW	(Japan) Taichi Sakuma	(Japan) Vanraure Hachinohe	Loan transfer
Pre-season	FW	(Japan) Kengo Kawamata	–	Contract expiration
Pre-season	FW	(Brazil) Tiago Leonço	(United Arab Emirates) Al-Dhafra	Free transfer
Pre-season	FW	(Brazil) Ricardo Lopes	(Ukraine) Vorskla Poltava	Free transfer

== Competitions ==
=== Overview ===
Competition	First match	Last match	Starting round	Record							
Competition	First match	Last match	Starting round	Pld	W	D	L	GF	GA	GD	Win %
J2 League	19 February 2023	12 November 2023	Matchday 1	15	4	5	6	15	20	−5	26.67
Emperor's Cup	7 June 2023		Second round	0	0	0	0	0	0	+0	—
Total				15	4	5	6	15	20	−5	26.67

Last updated: 13 May 2023
Source: Soccerway

=== J2 League ===
==== League table ====
Pos	Team	Pld	W	D	L	GF	GA	GD	Pts	Promotion or relegation
4	Shimizu S-Pulse	42	20	14	8	78	34	+44	74	Qualification for the promotion play-offs
5	Montedio Yamagata	42	21	4	17	64	54	+10	67	Qualification for the promotion play-offs
6	JEF United Chiba	42	19	10	13	61	53	+8	67	Qualification for the promotion play-offs
7	V-Varen Nagasaki	42	18	11	13	70	56	+14	65	
8	Ventforet Kofu	42	18	10	14	60	50	+10	64	

Source: Meiji Yasuda J2 League, J.League Data Site
Rules for classification: 1) Points; 2) Goal difference; 3) Goals scored; 4) Head-to-head points; 5) Head-to-head goal difference; 6) Head-to-head goal scored; 7) Fair-play points.

==== Results by round ====
Round	1	2	3	4	5	6	7	8	9	10	11	12	13	14	15	16
Ground	A	H	H	A	A	H	A	H	A	H	A	H	A	H	A	H
Result	W	L	D	L	L	D	L	D	L	W	D	W	D	L	W	
Positions	5	11	12	17	19	19	21	21	21	20	20	15	16	17	15	

Updated to match(es) played on 13 May 2023. Source: Worldfootball
A = Away; H = Home; W = Win; D = Draw; L = Loss

==== Matches ====
The league fixtures were announced on 20 January 2023.

18 February 2023 1	V-Varen Nagasaki	0–1	JEF United Chiba	Isahaya
14:00		Report	Komori 52'	Stadium: Transcosmos Stadium Nagasaki; Attendance: 11,165; Referee: Shuhei Shimizu

25 February 2023 2	JEF United Chiba	1–3	Montedio Yamagata	Chiba
14:00	Komori 19'	Report	Issaka 45'; Dellatorre 62'; Tiago Alves 83'	Stadium: Fukuda Denshi Arena; Attendance: 9,203; Referee: Keisuke Nobori

5 March 2023 3	JEF United Chiba	2–2	Thespakusatsu Gunma	Chiba
14:00	Komori 36'; Tsubaki 62'	Report	Take 4'; Hatao 45+3'	Stadium: Fukuda Denshi Arena; Attendance: 6,510; Referee: Koji Takasaki

12 March 2023 4	Blaublitz Akita	1–0	JEF United Chiba	Akita
14:00	Kawano 53'	Report		Stadium: Soyu Stadium; Attendance: 3,838; Referee: Hirokazu Otsubo

19 March 2023 5	Oita Trinita	2–1	JEF United Chiba	Oita
14:00	Takahata 13', 72'	Report	Buwanika 90+4'	Stadium: Resonac Dome Oita; Attendance: 8,527; Referee: Kazuyoshi Enomoto

25 March 2023 6	JEF United Chiba	1–1	Fagiano Okayama	Chiba
14:00	Komori 55'	Report	Suzuki 77'	Stadium: Fukuda Denshi Arena; Attendance: 5,317; Referee: Keigo Sendachi

2 April 2023 7	Zweigen Kanazawa	2–0	JEF United Chiba	Kanazawa
14:00	Leo Bahia 21'; Kato 54'	Report		Stadium: Ishikawa Athletics Stadium; Attendance: 3,357; Referee: Tomokazu Sato

8 April 2023 8	JEF United Chiba	2–2	Tokushima Vortis	Chiba
14:00	Komori 36'; Goya 52'	Report	Nishiya 12'; Kakitani 79'	Stadium: Fukuda Denshi Arena; Attendance: 5,475; Referee: Yuzo Sutani

12 April 2023 9	Fujieda MYFC	3–1	JEF United Chiba	Fujieda
19:00	Yokoyama 12'; Watanabe 40', 57'	Report	Suzuki 90+2'	Stadium: Fujieda Soccer Stadium; Attendance: 1,561; Referee: Koji Takasaki

16 April 2023 10	JEF United Chiba	1–0	Tokyo Verdy	Chiba
14:00	Buwanika 29'	Report		Stadium: Fukuda Denshi Arena; Attendance: 6,919; Referee: Hiroyoshi Takayama

21 April 2023 11	Roasso Kumamoto	2–2	JEF United Chiba	Kumamoto
19:00	Ezaki 70'; Aihara 90+9'	Report	Nishikubo 40'; Tsubaki 61'	Stadium: Egao Kenko Stadium; Attendance: 3,339; Referee: Reo Tanaka

29 April 2023 12	JEF United Chiba	1–0	Omiya Ardija	Chiba
15:00	Suzuki 53'	Report		Stadium: Fukuda Denshi Arena; Attendance: 9,606; Referee: Tetsuro Yoshida

3 May 2023 13	Renofa Yamaguchi	1–1	JEF United Chiba	Yamaguchi
14:00	Minagawa 71'	Report	Yonekura 90'	Stadium: Ishin Me-Life Stadium; Attendance: 5,365; Referee: Toru Kakinuma

7 May 2023 14	JEF United Chiba	0–1	Júbilo Iwata	Chiba
19:00		Report	Germain 70'	Stadium: Fukuda Denshi Arena; Attendance: 6,001; Referee: Shuhei Shimizu

13 May 2023 15	Ventforet Kofu	0–1	JEF United Chiba	Kofu
14:00		Report	Miki 29'	Stadium: JIT Recycle Ink Stadium; Attendance: 5,184; Referee: Keisuke Nobori

17 May 2023 16	JEF United Chiba	v	Shimizu S-Pulse	Chiba
19:00		Report		Stadium: Fukuda Denshi Arena

17 May 2023 17	JEF United Chiba	v	Tochigi SC	Chiba
14:00		Report		Stadium: Fukuda Denshi Arena

28 May 2023 18	Vegalta Sendai	v	JEF United Chiba	Sendai
14:00		Report		Stadium: Yurtec Stadium Sendai

3 June 2023 19	JEF United Chiba	v	Machida Zelvia	Chiba
18:00		Report		Stadium: Fukuda Denshi Arena

11 June 2023 20	Mito HollyHock	v	JEF United Chiba	Mito
16:00		Report		Stadium: K's denki Stadium Mito

18 June 2023 21	Iwaki FC	v	JEF United Chiba	Iwaki
16:00		Report		Stadium: Iwaki Greenfield Stadium

24 June 2023 22	JEF United Chiba	v	Oita Trinita	Chiba
19:00		Report		Stadium: Fukuda Denshi Arena

=== Emperor's Cup ===
7 June 2023 Second round	JEF United Chiba	v	Omiya Ardija	Chiba
19:00				Stadium: Fukuda Denshi Arena
