= 2025 Júbilo Iwata season =

Júbilo Iwata
2025 season
- Manager: John Hutchinson
- Stadium: Yamaha Stadium
- J2 League: 6th
- Emperor's Cup: Second round
- J.League Cup: Play-off round
- Top goalscorer: League: Matheus Peixoto (6); All: Matheus Peixoto (6)
- Biggest win: Hokkaido Consadole Sapporo 2–4 Júbilo Iwata; Júbilo Iwata 2–0 Iwaki FC
- Biggest defeat: Júbilo Iwata 0–3 Oita Trinita
- All statistics correct as of 25 May 2025.

The 2025 season is the 53rd in the history of Júbilo Iwata and the club's first following its return to the J2 League. Alongside its participation in the second division of Japanese football, Júbilo Iwata is also competing in the Emperor’s Cup and the J.League Cup.

== Transfers ==
=== In ===
Position	Player	From	Fee	Date	Ref
FW	(Japan) Ken Masui	(Japan) Nagoya Grampus	Loan	5 January 2025	
FW	(Japan) Ryoga Sato	(Japan) Avispa Fukuoka	Undisclosed	20 January 2025	
MF	(Japan) Yosuke Furukawa	(Poland) Górnik Zabrze	Loan return	30 June 2025	

=== Out ===
Position	Player	To	Fee	Date	Ref
MF	(Japan) Yosuke Furukawa	(Germany) Darmstadt 98	Undisclosed	1 July 2025	

== Competitions ==
=== Overall record ===
Competition	First match	Last match	Starting round	Final position	Record							
Competition	First match	Last match	Starting round	Final position	Pld	W	D	L	GF	GA	GD	Win %
J2 League	15 February 2025		Matchday 1		19	9	5	5	30	24	+6	47.37
Emperor's Cup	11 June 2025		First round	First round	1	0	0	1	0	2	−2	0.00
J.League Cup	26 March 2025	8 June 2025	First round	Play-off round	5	4	0	1	7	5	+2	80.00
Total					25	13	5	7	37	31	+6	52.00

Last updated: 15 June 2025
Source: Competitions

=== J2 League ===
==== Results summary ====
Overall								Home						Away					
Pld	W	D	L	GF	GA	GD	Pts	W	D	L	GF	GA	GD	W	D	L	GF	GA	GD
38	19	7	12	59	51	+8	64	11	2	6	30	24	+6	8	5	6	29	27	+2

Last updated: 29 November 2025.
Source: worldfootball

==== Results by round ====
Round	1	2	3	4	5	6	7	8	9	10	11	12	13	14	15	16	17	18
Ground	H	H	A	A	H	A	H	A	H	A	H	H	A	A	H	H	A	A
Result	W	W	L	L	W	W	W	D	D	L	L	L	D	W	W	W	D	D
Position	4	3	6	9	5	4	3	3	3	5	6	9	9	8	7	6	6	

Updated to match(es) played on 15 June 2025. Source:
A = Away; H = Home; W = Win; D = Draw; L = Loss

==== Matches ====
15 February 2025 1	Júbilo Iwata	3–2	Mito Hollyhock	Iwata
13:00 JST	Ken Masui 53'; Matheus Peixoto 68' (pen.); Watanabe 77'; Sato (yellow card) 86'	Report	Ando 79'; Sora Okita 90+5'	Stadium: Yamaha Stadium; Attendance: 11,819; Referee: (Japan) Yusuke Ohashi

22 February 2025 2	Júbilo Iwata	1–0	Sagan Tosu	Iwata
13:00 JST	Ken Masui 82'	Report	Morishita (yellow card) 45+2'	Stadium: Yamaha Stadium; Attendance: 9,716; Referee: (Japan) Tetsuro Yoshida

1 March 2025 3	V-Varen Nagasaki	1–0	Júbilo Iwata	Nagasaki
13:00 JST	Teruyama (yellow card) 23'; Kasayanagi 63'; Goto (yellow card) 84'; Yoneda (yellow card) 85'	[	Takuro Ezaki (yellow card) 60'; Kawasaki (yellow card) 79'; Kaneko (yellow card) 90+4'	Stadium: Peace Stadium Connected by SoftBank; Attendance: 15,083; Referee: (Japan) Koji Takasaki

9 March 2025 4	Kataller Toyama	3–1	Júbilo Iwata	Toyama
13:00 JST	Matsuda 33'; Shosei Usui 75'; Kamiyama 81'; Sho Fuseya (yellow card) 84'	Report	Matheus Peixoto 71'	Stadium: Toyama Stadium; Attendance: 7,580; Referee: (Japan) Kazuyoshi Enomoto

15 March 2025 5	Júbilo Iwata	2–1	Ventforet Kofu	Iwata
13:00 JST	Matheus Peixoto 43' 75'; Takuro Ezaki (yellow card) 65'	Report	Torikai 66' (pen.); Nakayama (yellow card) 80'	Stadium: Yamaha Stadium; Attendance: 15,447; Referee: (England) Elliot Bell

23 March 2025 6	Vegalta Sendai	2–3	Júbilo Iwata	Rifu
14:00 JST	Sugata 67'; Kamada (yellow card) 68'; Toya Myogan 87'	Report	Croux 23' (pen.); Hiroto Uemura 38'; Sato 88'; Matheus Peixoto (yellow card) 90+3'	Stadium: Miyagi Stadium; Attendance: 11,530; Referee: (Japan) Takafumi Mikuriya

30 March 2025 7	Júbilo Iwata	1–0	JEF United Chiba	Iwata
15:00	Sumi 6'; Matsubara (yellow card) 45'	Report	Tanaka (yellow card) 60'; Carlinhos Júnior (yellow card) 90+4'	Stadium: Yamaha Stadium; Attendance: 13,424; Referee: (Japan) Jumpei Iida

5 April 2025 8	Montedio Yamagata	0–0	Júbilo Iwata	Yamagata
14:00	Abe (yellow card) 33'	Report	Tokumo Kawai (yellow card) 90'	Stadium: ND Soft Stadium Yamagata; Attendance: 8,775; Referee: (Japan) Naoto Uehara

13 April 2025 9	Júbilo Iwata	1–1	Roasso Kumamoto	Iwata
15:00	Kaneko 72'	Report	Shiohama 3'; Ri Thae-ha (yellow card) 12'; Hakamata (yellow card) 62'	Stadium: Yamaha Stadium; Attendance: 7,902; Referee: (Japan) Yoshiro Imamura

20 April 2025 10	Blaublitz Akita	2–1	Júbilo Iwata	Akita
14:00	Kajiya 68'; Komatsu (yellow card) 80'; Kosuke Sagawa 90+2'	Report	Croux (yellow card) 17'; Ricardo Graça (yellow card) 49'; Matsubara (yellow card) 77'; Tokumo Kawai 83'	Stadium: Soyu Stadium; Attendance: 3,678; Referee: (Japan) Shu Kawamata

25 April 2025 11	Júbilo Iwata	0–3	Oita Trinita	Iwata
19:00		Report	Nomura 6'; Matheus Pereira (yellow card) 39'; Derlan 58'; Watanabe 64' (o.g.)	Stadium: Yamaha Stadium; Attendance: 8,753; Referee: (Japan) Tomohiro Inoue

29 April 2025 12	Júbilo Iwata	0–1	Renofa Yamaguchi	Iwata
15:00		Report	Yamamoto 66'	Stadium: Yamaha Stadium; Attendance: 10,659; Referee: (Japan) Keisuke Nobori

3 May 2025 13	FC Imabari	3–3	Júbilo Iwata	Imabari
14:00	Danilo Cardoso (yellow card) 32'; Yumeki Yokoyama 52' 61'; Omori (yellow card) 53'; Vinicius Diniz 59'; Marcus Índio (yellow card) 87'	Report	Sumi 25'; Kawasaki 45'; Miura (yellow card) 54'; Watanabe 56'; Hutchinson (yellow card) 60'	Stadium: ASICS Satoyama Stadium; Attendance: 5,195; Referee: (Japan) Kazuyoshi Enomoto

6 May 2025 14	Hokkaido Consadole Sapporo	2–4	Júbilo Iwata	Sapporo
14:00	Bakayoko (yellow card) 15'; Arano (yellow card) 45+5'; Jordi Sánchez 77'; Ieizumi 81'	Report	Ken Masui 1' 70'; Watanabe (yellow card) 11'; Ieizumi 20' (o.g.); Kaneko 25'; Ricardo Graça (yellow card) 50'; Matheus Peixoto (yellow card) 69'	Stadium: Sapporo Dome; Attendance: 14,214; Referee: (Japan) Hiroyuki Kimura

11 May 2025 15	Júbilo Iwata	1–0	Fujieda MYFC	Iwata
13:00	Kaneko (yellow card) 49'; Ricardo Graça (yellow card) 78'; Matheus Peixoto 90+5' (pen.)	Report	Hisadomi (yellow card) 17'; Kusumoto (yellow card) 34'; Okazawa (yellow card) 45+1'; Rokutan (yellow card) 46'	Stadium: Yamaha Stadium; Attendance: 12,261; Referee: (Japan) Genki Tawara

17 May 2025 16	Júbilo Iwata	2–0	Iwaki FC	Iwata
14:00 UTC+9				Stadium: Yamaha Stadium

25 May 2025 17	Tokushima Vortis	1–1	Júbilo Iwata	Naruto
14:00 UTC+9				Stadium: Pocari Sweat Stadium

31 May 2025 18	Omiya Ardija	2–2	Júbilo Iwata	Ōmiya-ku
14:00 UTC+9	González 35'; Toyokawa 68'		Masui 4'; Matheus Peixoto 90+5'	Stadium: NACK5 Stadium Omiya
Note: The match was suspended during the first half due to lightning and is scheduled to resume at 15:20.

15 June 2025 19	Júbilo Iwata	4–0	Ehime

=== Emperor's Cup ===
11 June 2025 Second round	Júbilo Iwata	1–2	Sagamihara	Iwata
19:00 UTC+9				Stadium: Yamaha Stadium

=== J.League Cup ===
26 March 2025 First round	FC Osaka	1–2	Júbilo Iwata	Higashiōsaka
19:00 UTC+9	Nishimura 22'		Sato 2'; Kawai 52'	Stadium: Hanazono Rugby Stadium

9 April 2025 Second round	Júbilo Iwata	2–1	Shimizu S-Pulse	Iwata
19:00 UTC+9				Stadium: Yamaha Stadium; Referee: Koei Koya

21 May 2025 Third round	Júbilo Iwata	2–1 (a.e.t.)	Gamba Osaka	Iwata
19:00 UTC+9				Stadium: Yamaha Stadium; Referee: Naoto Uehara

4 June 2025 Play-off round First leg	Shonan Bellmare	2–0	Júbilo Iwata	Hiratsuka
19:00 UTC+9	Nemoto 16' (pen.); Okuno 31'		Ueebisu (red card) 50'	Stadium: Lemon Gas Stadium Hiratsuka

8 June 2025 Play-off round Second leg	Júbilo Iwata	1–0 (1–2 agg.)	Shonan Bellmare	Iwata
14:00 UTC+9	Uehara 78'			Stadium: Yamaha Stadium

== Statistics ==
=== Goalscorers ===
Position	Player	J2 League	Emperor's Cup	J.League Cup	Total
FW	(Brazil) Matheus Peixoto	10	0	0	10
FW	(Japan) Ken Masui	6	0	0	6
FW	(Japan) Ryoga Sato	4	0	2	6
MF	(Japan) Daiki Kaneko	4	0	0	4
MF	(Japan) Koshiro Sumi	4	0	0	4
MF	(Japan) Ikki Kawasaki	3	0	1	4
MF	(Japan) Tokumo Kawai	1	0	1	2
MF	(Belgium) Jordy Croux	3	0	0	3
MF	(Japan) Shun Nakamura	1	0	0	1
DF	(Japan) Hiroto Uemura	1	0	0	1
FW	(Japan) Ryo Watanabe	6	0	0	6
DF	(Japan) Ryusei Yoshimura	0	0	1	1
DF	(Brazil) Ricardo Graça	2	0	1	3
MF	(Japan) Rikiya Uehara	0	0	1	1
