= Kazuki Tanaka =

Kazuki Tanaka may refer to:

- Kazuki Tanaka (baseball) (田中 和基, born 1994), Japanese baseball player
- Kazuki Tanaka (footballer) (田中 和樹, born 2000), Japanese footballer
