= Yusuke Maruhashi =

Japanese footballer

Yusuke Maruhashi 丸橋 祐介
Personal information
- Full name: Yusuke Maruhashi
- Date of birth: 2 September 1990 (age 36)
- Place of birth: Suminoe-ku, Osaka, Japan
- Height: 1.78 m (5 ft 10 in)
- Position: Left back

Youth career
- 2000–2002: Osaka City Jeunesse FC
- 2003–2008: Cerezo Osaka

Senior career*
Years	Team	Apps	(Gls)
2009–2023	Cerezo Osaka	390	(19)
2022–2023	→ BG Pathum United (loan)	14	(0)
2024	Sagan Tosu	21	(0)

International career^{‡}
2011	Japan U-23	1	(0)
Medal record
Cerezo Osaka
Winner	J.League Cup	2017
Winner	Emperor's Cup	2017
- * Club domestic league appearances and goals as of 26 December 2022 ‡ National team caps and goals as of February 9, 2011

Yusuke Maruhashi (丸橋 祐介, Maruhashi Yūsuke; born 2 September 1990 in Osaka) is a Japanese footballer who plays as a left-back for J1 League club Cerezo Osaka.

== Career ==
Maruhashi came up through the youth ranks of Cerezo Osaka and played at the club for 14 seasons from 2009 to 2022, making over 400 appearances. In 2022 he joined Thai League 1 side BG Pathum United on loan for a season, before returning to Cerezo in May 2023.

== Career statistics ==
Updated 21 May 2023.

Club	Season	League	League		Cup^{1}		League Cup^{2}		Continental^{3}		Other^{4}		Total	
Club	Season	League	Apps	Goals	Apps	Goals	Apps	Goals	Apps	Goals	Apps	Goals	Apps	Goals
Cerezo Osaka	2009	J1 League	0	0	0	0	–		–		–		0	0
Cerezo Osaka	2010	J1 League	24	2	3	1	4	1	–		–		31	4
Cerezo Osaka	2011	J1 League	32	1	5	0	1	0	8	0	–		46	1
Cerezo Osaka	2012	J1 League	24	1	4	0	6	0	–		–		34	1
Cerezo Osaka	2013	J1 League	31	0	2	0	8	1	–		–		41	1
Cerezo Osaka	2014	J1 League	33	3	3	0	2	0	7	0	–		45	3
Cerezo Osaka	2015	J2 League	39	0	0	0	–		–		2	0	41	0
Cerezo Osaka	2016	J2 League	40	1	3	1	–		–		2	0	45	2
Cerezo Osaka	2017	J1 League	33	1	4	0	6	1	–		–		43	2
Cerezo Osaka	2018	J1 League	33	6	2	0	0	0	3	0	1	0	39	6
Cerezo Osaka	2019	J1 League	32	2	1	0	0	0	–		–		33	2
Cerezo Osaka	2020	J1 League	31	1	–		3	1	–		–		34	2
Cerezo Osaka	2021	J1 League	33	1	3	0	4	0	6	1	–		46	2
Cerezo Osaka	2022	J1 League	5	0	–		3	0	–		–		8	0
BG Pathum United (loan)	2022–23	Thai League 1	11	0	2	0	2	0	–		–		0	0
Career total			402	19	32	2	39	4	24	1	5	0	487	26

^{1}Includes Emperor's Cup, Thai FA Cup.

^{2}Includes J. League Cup, Thai League Cup.

^{3}Includes AFC Champions League.

^{4}Includes J2 Play-offs and Japanese Super Cup.

== Honours ==
Cerezo Osaka

- J.League Cup: 2017
- Emperor's Cup: 2017
- Japanese Super Cup: 2018

BG Pathum United

- Thai League Cup runners-up: 2022–23
