= Koki Inoue (footballer) =

Japanese footballer (born 2001)

Personal information
- Date of birth: 20 June 2001 (age 25)
- Place of birth: Kyoto, Japan
- Height: 1.90 m (6 ft 3 in)
- Position: Defender

Team information
- Current team: Azul Claro Numazu
- Number: 28

Youth career
- Tahata SSS
- –2019: Kyoto Sanga

Senior career*
Years	Team	Apps	(Gls)
2020–	Azul Claro Numazu	44	(2)

International career^{‡}
2018	Japan U17	2	(0)
- * Club domestic league appearances and goals as of 1 January 2026 ‡ National team caps and goals as of 17:04, 3 July 2021 (UTC)

Koki Inoue (井上 航希, Inoue Koki; born 20 June 2001) is a Japanese footballer currently playing as a defender for Azul Claro Numazu.

== Career statistics ==
=== Club ===
As of 3 July 2021.

Club	Season	League			National Cup		League Cup		Other		Total	
Club	Season	Division	Apps	Goals	Apps	Goals	Apps	Goals	Apps	Goals	Apps	Goals
Azul Claro Numazu	2020	J3 League	0	0	0	0	–		0	0	0	0
Azul Claro Numazu	2021	J3 League	1	0	0	0	–		0	0	1	0
Career total			1	0	0	0	0	0	0	0	1	0
