= Tomoya Shinohara =

Japanese footballer

Personal information
- Date of birth: 20 April 1999 (age 27)
- Place of birth: Tokyo, Japan
- Height: 1.76 m (5 ft 9 in)
- Position: Midfielder

Youth career
- Furoku SC
- –2017: Kanto Daiichi HS
- 2018–2021: Toin University of Yokohama

Senior career*
Years	Team	Apps	(Gls)
2022–2023	JEF United Chiba	4	(0)
Total		4	(0)
- * Club domestic league appearances and goals as of 14:05, 8 February 2024 (UTC)

Tomoya Shinohara (篠原 友哉, Shinohara Tomoya; born 20 April 1999) is a Japanese former footballer who played as a midfielder for JEF United Chiba.

== Career ==
Shinohara started his youth career at Kanto Daiichi High School, where he made multiple appearances in the Inter High School Championship in 2016 and 2017. He then attended Toin University of Yokohama and played for their football team between 2018 and 2021. He was a prominent member of the University team competing in JUFA Kanto League 1 and the Emperor's Cup, making 59 appearances, scoring 14 goals.

In February 2022, he joined J2 League club JEF United Chiba for the 2022 season. He made his debut in the same month, in a 2–1 win over FC Ryukyu. He made four appearances throughout his debut season.

Shinohara did not play at all throughout the 2023 season and in November 2023 announced his retirement, aged 24. He underwent surgery in June of the previous year due to repeated heart attacks during training. Since then, he had been suffering from shortness of breath and a generally poor condition for more than a year, leaving him no longer able to even participate in training. Rehabilitation efforts aimed at his return were not successful, and after receiving a second opinion, it was decided that it would be difficult for him to continue as a soccer player, and he decided to retire.

== Career statistics ==
Appearances and goals by club, season and competition
Club	Season	League			National Cup		Total	
Club	Season	Division	Apps	Goals	Apps	Goals	Apps	Goals
Japan			League		Emperor's Cup		Total	
Toin University of Yokohama	2019	–			2	0	2	0
Toin University of Yokohama	2021	–			1	0	1	0
Toin University of Yokohama	Total		0	0	3	0	3	0
JEF United Chiba	2022	J2 League	4	0	0	0	4	0
Career total			4	0	3	0	7	0
