= Yukuto Omoya =

Japanese footballer

Personal information
- Date of birth: 29 August 1998 (age 28)
- Place of birth: Osaka, Japan
- Height: 1.80 m (5 ft 11 in)
- Position: Defender

Team information
- Current team: Reilac Shiga FC
- Number: 3

Youth career
- Nagao SC
- Nishi Nagao FC
- Kyoto Sanga
- Tokai University Gyosei HS
- –2020: Tokai University

Senior career*
| Years | Team | Apps | (Gls) |
| 2021– | Tochigi SC | 27 | (1) |
| 2022-2023 | → SC Sagamihara (loan) | 7 | (0) |
| 2023- | Reilac Shiga FC(Loan) | 11 | (1) |
- * Club domestic league appearances and goals as of 17:04, 25 May 2022 (UTC)

Yukuto Omoya (面矢 行斗, Omoya Yukuto; born 29 August 1998) is a Japanese footballer currently playing as a defender for SC Sagamihara, on loan from Tochigi SC.

== Career statistics ==
=== Club ===
As of 27 February 2021.

| Club | Season | League | | | National Cup | | League Cup | | Other | | Total | |
| Club | Season | Division | Apps | Goals | Apps | Goals | Apps | Goals | Apps | Goals | Apps | Goals |
|---|---|---|---|---|---|---|---|---|---|---|---|---|
| Tochigi SC | 2021 | J2 League | 1 | 0 | 0 | 0 | 0 | 0 | 0 | 0 | 1 | 0 |
| Career total | | | 1 | 0 | 0 | 0 | 0 | 0 | 0 | 0 | 1 | 0 |
