= Keita Yamashita =

Japanese footballer

Keita Yamashita 山下 敬大
Personal information
- Full name: Keita Yamashita
- Date of birth: March 13, 1996 (age 30)
- Place of birth: Tagawa District, Fukuoka, Japan
- Height: 1.84 m (6 ft 1/2 in)
- Positions: Forward; winger

Team information
- Current team: Tochigi City
- Number: 8

Youth career
- 2011–2013: Kyushu International; University High School

College career
Years	Team	Apps	(Gls)
2014–2017	Fukuoka University		

Senior career*
Years	Team	Apps	(Gls)
2018–2019	Renofa Yamaguchi FC	72	(16)
2020	JEF United Chiba	34	(7)
2021	Sagan Tosu	35	(9)
2022–2025	FC Tokyo	33	(1)
2023	→ Shonan Bellmare (loan)	5	(0)
2026–	Tochigi City	21	(6)
- * Club domestic league appearances and goals as of 16 August 2026

Keita Yamashita (山下 敬大, Yamashita Keita; born March 13, 1996) is a Japanese footballer who plays as a forward for J2 League club Tochigi City.

== Career ==
After attending Fukuoka University, Yamashita joined Renofa Yamaguchi FC for 2018 season.

On 17 December 2019, Yamashita was announced at JEF United Chiba on a permanent transfer, after scoring 11 goals in 37 games during the 2019 season.

On 29 December 2020, Yamashita was announced at Sagan Tosu. On 6 March 2021, Yamashita scored his first J1 goals against Urawa Reds.

On 23 December 2021, Yamashita signed for FC Tokyo from Kyushu club Sagan Tosu.

In earlier 2023 season, Yamashita signed for Shonan Bellmare on loan transfer. After just 5 league appearances, he returned to FC Tokyo on 17 August 2023.

== Club statistics ==
As of 10 April 2026

Appearances and goals by club, season and competition
Club	Season	League			National cup (Note: Includes Emperors Cup)		League cup (Note: Includes J.League Cup)		Total	
Club	Season	Division	Apps	Goals	Apps	Goals	Apps	Goals	Apps	Goals
Fukuoka University	2015	–			1	0	–		1	0
Renofa Yamaguchi	2018	J2 League	35	5	2	1	–		37	6
Renofa Yamaguchi	2019	J2 League	37	11	2	1	–		39	12
Renofa Yamaguchi	Total		72	16	4	2	0	0	76	18
JEF United Chiba	2020	J2 League	34	7	0	0	–		34	7
Sagan Tosu	2021	J1 League	35	9	3	1	4	0	42	10
FC Tokyo	2022	J1 League	15	0	1	0	5	0	21	0
FC Tokyo	2024	J1 League	6	0	0	0	0	0	6	0
FC Tokyo	2025	J1 League	12	1	2	0	0	0	14	1
FC Tokyo	Total		33	1	3	0	5	0	41	1
Shonan Bellmare (loan)	2023	J1 League	5	0	0	0	3	0	8	0
Tochigi City	2026	J2/J3 (100)	9	0	–		–		9	0
Career total			188	33	11	3	12	0	211	36
