= Ikki Kawasaki =

Japanese footballer

Personal information
- Full name: Ikki Kawasaki
- Date of birth: 8 November 1997 (age 29)
- Place of birth: Osaka, Japan
- Height: 1.74 m (5 ft 9 in)
- Position: Forward

Team information
- Current team: Júbilo Iwata
- Number: 37

Youth career
- Nagao SC
- –2012: Gamba Osaka Kadoma
- 2013–2015: Tokai Univ. Gyosei High School

College career
Years	Team	Apps	(Gls)
2016–2019	Osaka University of Economics		

Senior career*
Years	Team	Apps	(Gls)
2020–2023	Kamatamare Sanuki	114	(8)
2024–	Júbilo Iwata	50	(4)
- * Club domestic league appearances and goals as of 14 August 2026

Ikki Kawasaki (川﨑 一輝, Kawasaki Ikki; born 8 November 1997) is a Japanese footballer currently playing as a forward for Júbilo Iwata.

== Early life ==
Ikki was born in Osaka. He played for Nagao SC, Gamba Osaka and Tokai University Osaka Gyosei High School at youth level, and later played university football for Osaka University of Economics, in his final stage before turning professional.

== Career ==
Ikki scored on his debut for Kamatamare, in a match played against Gamba Osaka U-23s on the 28th of June 2020, in which he scored in the 64th minute.

== Career statistics ==
=== Club ===
As of 10 November 2020.

Club	Season	League			National Cup		League Cup		Other		Total	
Club	Season	Division	Apps	Goals	Apps	Goals	Apps	Goals	Apps	Goals	Apps	Goals
Kamatamare Sanuki	2020	J3 League	20	2	0	0	–		0	0	20	2
Career total			20	2	0	0	0	0	0	0	20	2
