= 2018 Japanese Super Cup =

2018 Xerox Super Cup
Kawasaki Frontale	Cerezo Osaka
2	3
- Date: 10 February 2018
- Venue: Saitama Stadium 2002, Saitama
- Referee: Koichiro Fukushima
- Attendance: 41,803

The 2018 Xerox Super Cup was held on 10 February 2018 between the 2017 J1 League champions Kawasaki Frontale and the 2017 Emperor's Cup winner Cerezo Osaka. Cerezo won the title after winning 3–2.

== Match details ==
10 February 2018
13:35 JST

Kawasaki Frontale	2–3	Cerezo Osaka
Kobayashi 51'; Ōkubo 90+2'	Report	26' Yamaguchi; 48' Kiyotake; 78' Takagi

Saitama Stadium 2002, Saitama
Attendance: 41,803
Referee: Koichiro Fukushima

== See also ==
- 2017 J1 League
- 2017 Emperor's Cup
