= Takuma Otake =

Japanese footballer

Takuma Otake 大嶽 拓馬
Personal information
- Full name: Takuma Otake
- Date of birth: 8 August 2002 (age 24)
- Place of birth: Ibaraki, Japan
- Height: 1.72 m (5 ft 8 in)
- Position: Left back

Team information
- Current team: Ehime FC (on loan from Kashiwa Reysol)
- Number: 19

Youth career
- FC Ishioka
- –2021: Kashiwa Reysol

Senior career*
Years	Team	Apps	(Gls)
2021–	Kashiwa Reysol	0	(0)
2023–	→ Ehime FC (loan)	0	(0)
- * Club domestic league appearances and goals as of 17:37, 1 September 2023 (UTC)

Takuma Otake (大嶽 拓馬, Otake Takuma; born 8 August 2002) is a Japanese footballer who plays as a left back for J3 League club Ehime FC, on loan from Kashiwa Reysol.

== Career statistics ==
=== Club ===
As of 3 March 2023.

Appearances and goals by club, season and competition
Club	Season	League			National Cup		League Cup		Other		Total	
Club	Season	Division	Apps	Goals	Apps	Goals	Apps	Goals	Apps	Goals	Apps	Goals
Japan			League		Emperor's Cup		J.League Cup		Other		Total	
Kashiwa Reysol	2021	J1 League	0	0	0	0	3	0	–		3	0
Kashiwa Reysol	2022	J1 League	0	0	0	0	1	0	–		1	0
Kashiwa Reysol	Total		0	0	0	0	4	0	0	0	4	0
Ehime FC (loan)	2023	J3 League	0	0	0	0	–		–		0	0
Career total			0	0	0	0	4	0	0	0	4	0
