= Hiromu Tanaka =

Japanese footballer

Hiromu Tanaka 田中 宏武
Personal information
- Date of birth: 15 April 1999 (age 27)
- Place of birth: Gunma, Japan
- Height: 1.74 m (5 ft 9 in)
- Position: Left midfielder

Team information
- Current team: PSS Sleman
- Number: 7

Youth career
- FC Ojima
- Maebashi FC
- 2015–2017: Kiryu Daiichi High School

College career
Years	Team	Apps	(Gls)
2018–2021	Rissho University		

Senior career*
Years	Team	Apps	(Gls)
2022–2026	Hokkaido Consadole Sapporo	27	(0)
2023–2024	→ Fujieda MYFC (loan)	8	(0)
2026–	PSS Sleman	8	(3)
- * Club domestic league appearances and goals as of 1 November 2026

Hiromu Tanaka (田中 宏武, Tanaka Hiromu; born 15 April 1999) is a Japanese footballer who plays as a left midfielder for Super League club PSS Sleman.

== Personal life ==
Tanaka is the brother of fellow footballer Wataru Tanaka.

== Career statistics ==
=== Club ===
As of 27 July 2023.

Appearances and goals by club, season and competition
Club	Season	League			National Cup		League Cup		Total	
Club	Season	Division	Apps	Goals	Apps	Goals	Apps	Goals	Apps	Goals
Japan			League		Emperor's Cup		J. League Cup		Total	
Hokkaido Consadole Sapporo	2021	J1 League	0	0	0	0	3	0	3	0
Hokkaido Consadole Sapporo	2022	J1 League	1	0	2	0	7	0	10	0
Hokkaido Consadole Sapporo	2023	J1 League	0	0	2	0	4	0	6	0
Hokkaido Consadole Sapporo	Total		1	0	4	0	14	0	19	0
Fujieda MYFC (loan)	2023	J2 League	0	0	0	0	0	0	0	0
Career total			1	0	4	0	14	0	19	0
