= Keita Buwanika =

Japanese footballer (born 2002)

Keita Buwanika ブワニカ 啓太
Personal information
- Date of birth: 16 December 2002 (age 23)
- Place of birth: Tokyo, Japan
- Height: 1.86 m (6 ft 1 in)
- Position: Forward

Team information
- Current team: Zweigen Kanazawa
- Number: 9

Youth career
- 2012–2014: Rabbit Kickers
- 2015–2017: Matsudo Dairoku Junior High School
- 2018–2020: Shutoku High School

Senior career*
Years	Team	Apps	(Gls)
2021–2023	JEF United Chiba	55	(8)
2023	→ Mito HollyHock (loan)	9	(1)
2024–2025	Iwaki FC	26	(0)
2026–	Zweigen Kanazawa	18	(4)
- * Club domestic league appearances and goals as of 21 August 2026

Keita Buwanika (ブワニカ 啓太, Buwanika Keita; born 16 December 2002) is a Japanese professional footballer who plays as a forward for Zweigen Kanazawa. He was born in Tokyo. His father is from Uganda and his mother is Japanese.

== Career statistics ==
=== Club ===
As of 28 April 2024

Appearances and goals by club, season and competition
Club	Season	League			National Cup		League Cup		Other		Total	
Club	Season	Division	Apps	Goals	Apps	Goals	Apps	Goals	Apps	Goals	Apps	Goals
Japan			League		Emperor's Cup		J. League Cup		Other		Total	
JEF United Chiba	2021	J2 League	14	1	1	0	–		–		15	1
JEF United Chiba	2022	J2 League	25	5	1	0	–		–		26	5
JEF United Chiba	2023	J2 League	16	2	1	0	–		–		17	2
JEF United Chiba	Total		55	8	3	0	0	0	0	0	58	8
Mito HollyHock (loan)	2023	J2 League	9	1	0	0	–		–		9	1
Iwaki FC	2024	J2 League	7	0	0	0	2	0	0	0	9	0
Career total			71	9	3	0	2	0	0	0	76	9
