= Mikel Agu =

Nigerian professional footballer (born 1993)

Personal information
- Full name: Mikel Ndubusi Agu
- Date of birth: 27 May 1993 (age 33)
- Place of birth: Benin City, Nigeria
- Height: 1.86 m (6 ft 1 in)
- Positions: Defensive midfielder; centre back

Youth career
- 2009–2011: Megapp FC
- 2011–2012: Porto

Senior career*
Years	Team	Apps	(Gls)
2012–2015	Porto B	69	(2)
2014–2019	Porto	2	(0)
2015–2016	→ Club Brugge (loan)	2	(0)
2016–2017	→ Vitória Setúbal (loan)	27	(0)
2017–2018	→ Bursaspor (loan)	23	(2)
2018–2019	→ Vitória Setúbal (loan)	18	(1)
2019–2022	Vitória Guimarães	27	(1)
2022	Fuenlabrada	15	(0)
2022–2023	Shonan Bellmare	0	(0)
2023	Giravanz Kitakyushu	7	(0)

International career^{‡}
2017–	Nigeria	8	(0)
- * Club domestic league appearances and goals as of 05 September 2023 (UTC) ‡ National team caps and goals as of 05 September 2023

Mikel Ndubusi Agu (born 27 May 1993) is a Nigerian professional footballer who played as defensive midfielder or a centre back.

== Club career ==
=== Early career ===
Mikel Agu started his career with grassroots team Megapp FC in Nigeria. He took part in the 2009 Copa Coca-Cola, where he was chosen as the best player of the tournament, attracting the interest of scouts. After the tournament, Agu joined the youth academy of Porto.

==== Porto ====
Agu was first signed under the Porto-U 19 setup training with the senior team with the occasional bench appearance. His development would see him play 2 seasons for Porto B before eventually getting an opportunity to play for the first team. Agu made his debut against Gil Vicente in a 2–1 win coming as a substitute for Josué. Doing so, he became the first Nigerian to play for the club. Following his wonderful performance in Porto B, the then manager Paulo Fonseca promoted him to the main team. He would then be sent on loan to gain experience playing in the first division.

Seeking playing opportunities at Porto, Agu was deployed mostly in the Porto B team, with whom he made 69 league appearances between 2012 and 2016. He completed over 30 appearances in each of the 2012–13 and 20–2014 seasons.

==== Loans ====
At the start of the 2015/2016 season, after making one appearance for Porto B, he went on loan to Club Brugge in the Belgian Jupiler league. He made just two league appearances as Brugge finished the season as league champions.

Agu was loaned back to the Portuguese league for the 2016–17 season, which served somewhat as a breakout season for him. He made 27 league appearances, starting 25 times; and 34 total appearances in all competitions for Vitória de Setúbal He played a part as they made a run to the semi-final in the Taça da Liga. His much improved game-play ensured that he was finally recognized as a top player within his own right. His performances were also noticed by his country's national team, leading to a call-up in 2017. This decision was made that he would be recalled to the Porto first team at the end of the season.

In August 2017, Agu joined Turkish side Bursaspor on a season-long loan deal. He then spent the 2018–19 campaign on loan at former side Vitória de Setúbal before leaving Porto permanently in 2019.

=== Vitória de Guimarães ===
On 18 July 2019, Agu signed a three-year contract with Vitória de Guimarães. After featuring sparingly in his first two years, he was separated from the squad ahead of the 2021–22 season, and terminated his contract on 15 January 2022.

=== Fuenlabrada ===
On 15 January 2022, just hours after leaving Vitória, Agu moved to Spain and signed a short-term deal with CF Fuenlabrada in Segunda División.

=== Shonan Bellmare ===
In September 2022, he signed with Japanese side Shonan Bellmare. He left in June 2023 having played once.

== International career ==
He was selected by Nigeria for their 35-man provisional squad for the 2016 Summer Olympics. Agu made his senior debut for Nigeria in a 3-0 friendly win over Togo on 1 June 2017.

In May 2018 he was named in Nigeria's preliminary 30 man squad for the 2018 World Cup in Russia. However, he did not make the final 23.

== Style of play ==
Agu's style of play can be likened to former Chelsea player John Obi Mikel. He received the nickname "Mikel" from fans in Benin City, where he grew up, due to similarities in movement and overall play. He has an excellent close-control and has shown a very good passing range, complementing this with the vision to play long balls from the back. On occasion, he has shown the ability to control the tempo of the game. Defensively, he shows good anticipation and does not rush into his tackles, positioning himself just in front of the back four.

== Honours ==
=== Club ===
Club Brugge

- Belgian Pro League: 2015–16
- Belgian Cup: Runner-up 2015–16

=== Individual ===
- Tournament MVP Copa Coca-Cola, 2009
