= Masaya Shibayama =

Japanese footballer

Masaya Shibayama 柴山 昌也
Personal information
- Date of birth: 2 July 2002 (age 24)
- Place of birth: Gunma, Japan
- Height: 1.61 m (5 ft 3 in)
- Position: Midfielder

Team information
- Current team: Cerezo Osaka
- Number: 48

Youth career
- 2009–2014: Takasaki FC Nakagawa
- 2015–2020: Omiya Ardija

Senior career*
Years	Team	Apps	(Gls)
2020–2023	Omiya Ardija	94	(8)
2023–	Cerezo Osaka	86	(6)
- * Club domestic league appearances and goals as of 10 August 2026

Masaya Shibayama (柴山 昌也, Shibayama Masaya; born 2 July 2002) is a Japanese footballer who plays as a midfielder for J1 League club Cerezo Osaka.

== Career ==
On 23 October 2020, Shibayama was registered as a first team player with Omiya Ardija.

On 28 July 2023, Shibayama was announced at Cerezo Osaka.

== Career statistics ==
=== Club ===
As of 10 June 2024

Appearances and goals by club, season and competition
Club	Season	League			National Cup		League Cup		Other		Total	
Club	Season	Division	Apps	Goals	Apps	Goals	Apps	Goals	Apps	Goals	Apps	Goals
Japan			League		Emperor's Cup		J. League Cup		Other		Total	
Omiya Ardija	2020	J2 League	1	0	0	0	–		–		1	0
Omiya Ardija	2021	J2 League	31	1	1	0	–		–		32	1
Omiya Ardija	2022	J2 League	35	3	1	0	–		–		36	3
Omiya Ardija	2023	J2 League	27	4	2	1	–		–		36	3
Omiya Ardija	Total		94	8	4	1	0	0	0	0	98	9
Cerezo Osaka	2023	J1 League	9	0	0	0	0	0	–		9	0
Cerezo Osaka	2024	J1 League	11	1	0	0	1	0	0	0	12	1
Cerezo Osaka	Total		20	1	0	0	1	0	0	0	21	1
Career total			114	9	4	1	1	0	0	0	126	8
