= Tatsuhiko Noguchi =

Japanese footballer

Personal information
- Date of birth: 20 November 1997 (age 28)
- Place of birth: Osaka, Japan
- Height: 1.75 m (5 ft 9 in)
- Position: Forward

Team information
- Current team: Veertien Mie
- Number: 25

Youth career
- Takatsuki FC
- 2014–2016: Maebashi Ikuei High School

College career
Years	Team	Apps	(Gls)
2016–2019	Chuo University		

Senior career*
Years	Team	Apps	(Gls)
2020–2024	Fagiano Okayama	35	(1)
2021-2022	→ ReinMeer Aomori (loan)	14	(1)
2023-2024	Kataller Toyama (Loan)	9	(0)
2024-	Veertien Mie	8	(0)
- * Club domestic league appearances and goals as of 27 August 2024 @ 16:15(AEST)

Tatsuhiko Noguchi (野口 竜彦, Noguchi Tatsuhiko; born 20 November 1997) is a Japanese footballer currently playing as a forward for Fagiano Okayama.

== Career statistics ==
=== Club ===
As of 12 November 2020.

Club	Season	League			National Cup		League Cup		Other		Total	
Club	Season	Division	Apps	Goals	Apps	Goals	Apps	Goals	Apps	Goals	Apps	Goals
Fagiano Okayama	2020	J2 League	24	1	0	0	0	0	0	0	24	1
Career total			24	1	0	0	0	0	0	0	24	1
