= Rui Sueyoshi =

Japanese professional footballer

Rui Sueyoshi 末吉 塁
Personal information
- Full name: Rui Sueyoshi
- Date of birth: 26 July 1996 (age 30)
- Place of birth: Osaka, Japan
- Height: 1.66 m (5 ft 5 in)
- Position: Midfielder

Team information
- Current team: Fagiano Okayama
- Number: 17

Youth career
- –2011: Kawakami FC
- 2012–2014: Hatsushiba Hashimoto High School

College career
Years	Team	Apps	(Gls)
2015–2018	Osaka University H&SS		

Senior career*
Years	Team	Apps	(Gls)
2019–2021	Montedio Yamagata	32	(1)
2021–2023	JEF United Chiba	60	(1)
2023	→ Fagiano Okayama (loan)	15	(0)
2024–	Fagiano Okayama	44	(2)
- * Club domestic league appearances and goals as of 12 August 2026

Rui Sueyoshi (末吉 塁, Sueyoshi Rui; born 26 July 1996) is a Japanese professional footballer who plays as a midfielder for Fagiano Okayama.

== Early life ==
In 2015, whilst playing for Osaka University of Health and Sport Sciences, Sueyoshi won the All Japan High School Soccer Championship: Outstanding Player award.

== Career ==
On 10 September 2018, Sueyoshi was announced at Montedio Yamagata from the 2019 season, joining as a specially designated player. He made his league debut against Machida Zelvia on 10 March 2019. Sueyoshi scored his first league goal against JEF United Chiba on 8 November 2020, scoring in the 53rd minute.

On 28 December 2020, Sueyoshi was announced at JEF United Chiba. He made his league debut against Ventforet Kofu on 28 February 2021. Sueyoshi scored his first league goal against Fagiano Okayama on 5 December 2021, scoring in the 45th minute.

On 13 July 2023, Sueyoshi was announced at Fagiano Okayama on loan. He made his league debut against Roasso Kumamoto on 24 July 2023.

On 15 December 2023, Sueyoshi was announced at Fagiano Okayama on a permanent transfer. He made his league debut against Tochigi SC on 25 February 2024. Sueyoshi scored his first league goal against Roasso Kumamoto on 16 June 2024, scoring in the 90th+4th minute.
