= Kazuki Tanaka (footballer) =

Japanese footballer

Kazuki Tanaka 田中 和樹
Personal information
- Date of birth: January 13, 2000 (age 26)
- Place of birth: Tochigi, Japan
- Height: 1.73 m (5 ft 8 in)
- Position: Forward

Team information
- Current team: JEF United Chiba
- Number: 7

Youth career
- Pal SC
- 2012–2014: Verdy SS Oyama
- 2015–2017: Urawa Gakuin High School

College career
Years	Team	Apps	(Gls)
2018–2021	Hosei University		

Senior career*
Years	Team	Apps	(Gls)
2017	FC Tokyo U-23	3	(0)
2022–2023	Kyoto Sanga	1	(0)
2023	→ JEF United Chiba (loan)	38	(2)
2024–	JEF United Chiba	62	(8)
- * Club domestic league appearances and goals as of 12 August 2026

Kazuki Tanaka (田中 和樹, Tanaka Kazuki; born January 13, 2000) is a Japanese professional footballer who plays as a forward for J1 League club JEF United Chiba.

== Career ==
Kazuki Tanaka joined J1 League club FC Tokyo in 2017.

== Career statistics ==
As of 8 November 2023

Appearances and goals by club, season and competition
Club	Season	League			Emperor's Cup		J. League Cup		Other		Total	
Club	Season	Division	Apps	Goals	Apps	Goals	Apps	Goals	Apps	Goals	Apps	Goals
FC Tokyo U-23	2017	J3 League	3	0	0	0	–		–		3	0
Hosei University	2019	–			3	0	–		–		3	0
Kyoto Sanga	2022	J1 League	1	0	5	0	6	0	–		12	0
JEF United Chiba (loan)	2023	J2 League	38	2	1	0	–		–		39	2
Career total			42	2	9	0	6	0	0	0	57	2
