= Ryo Watanabe (footballer, born October 1996) =

Japanese footballer

Personal information
- Date of birth: 25 October 1996 (age 30)
- Place of birth: Tokyo, Japan
- Height: 1.78 m (5 ft 10 in)
- Position: Forward

Team information
- Current team: Júbilo Iwata
- Number: 9

Youth career
- 2003–2008: Shibuya Central SC
- 2009–2011: Yoyogi Junior High School
- 2012–2014: Takanawa High School

College career
Years	Team	Apps	(Gls)
2015–2018	Sanno Institute of Management		

Senior career*
Years	Team	Apps	(Gls)
2019–2022	Azul Claro Numazu	77	(17)
2022–2023	Fujieda MYFC	46	(16)
2023–2024	Cerezo Osaka	14	(1)
2024	→ Júbilo Iwata (loan)	11	(2)
2025–	Júbilo Iwata	49	(8)
- * Club domestic league appearances and goals as of 14 August 2026

Ryo Watanabe (渡邉 りょう, Watanabe Ryō; born 25 October 1996) is a Japanese professional footballer who plays as a forward for Júbilo Iwata.

== Career ==
On 10 January 2019, Watanabe was announced at Azul Claro Numazu from the 2019 season. Whilst at Azul Claro Numazu, he worked as a hotel receptionist and at a car dealership, but after transferring to Fujieda, he was able to focus solely on football. Watanabe made his league debut against Cerezo Osaka U-23 on 10 March 2019. He scored his first league goal against Kataller Toyama on 11 July 2020, scoring in the 89th minute.

On 13 July 2022, Watanabe was announced at Fujieda MYFC. He made his league debut against Tegevajaro Miyazaki on 17 July 2022. Watanabe scored his first league goal against FC Gifu on 14 September 2022, scoring a penalty in the 65th minute.

On 23 July 2023, Watanabe was announced at Cerezo Osaka. He made his league debut against FC Tokyo on 6 August 2023. Watanabe scored his first league goal against Kawasaki Frontale on 2 September 2023, scoring a penalty in the 90th+2nd minute.

On 29 July 2024, Watanabe was announced at Júbilo Iwata on a six month loan deal. He made his league debut against Albirex Niigata on 7 August 2024. Watanabe scored his first league goal against Kashiwa Reysol on 14 September 2024, scoring in the 5th minute.

On 5 January 2025, Watanabe was announced at Júbilo Iwata on a permanent transfer.

== Career statistics ==
=== Club ===
As of 10 July 2022.

Club	Season	League			National Cup		League Cup		Other		Total	
Club	Season	Division	Apps	Goals	Apps	Goals	Apps	Goals	Apps	Goals	Apps	Goals
Azul Claro Numazu	2019	J3 League	7	0	0	0	–		0	0	7	0
Azul Claro Numazu	2020	J3 League	34	7	0	0	–		0	0	34	7
Azul Claro Numazu	2021	J3 League	21	7	0	0	–		0	0	21	7
Azul Claro Numazu	2022	J3 League	15	3	0	0	–		0	0	15	3
Career total			77	17	0	0	0	0	0	0	77	17
