= Kōsei Okazawa =

Japanese footballer

Kōsei Okazawa 岡澤 昂星
Personal information
- Date of birth: 22 October 2003 (age 23)
- Place of birth: Osaka, Japan
- Height: 1.65 m (5 ft 5 in)
- Position: Defensive midfielder

Team information
- Current team: Cerezo Osaka
- Number: 28

Youth career
- 2011–2015: Owada SSS
- 2016–2021: Cerezo Osaka

Senior career*
Years	Team	Apps	(Gls)
2020	Cerezo Osaka U-23	30	(0)
2022–	Cerezo Osaka	1	(0)
2022–2023	→ Red Bull Bragantino (loan)	0	(0)
2023–2024	→ FC Ryukyu (loan)	55	(3)
2025–2026	→ Fujieda MYFC (loan)	47	(3)
- * Club domestic league appearances and goals as of 10 August 2026

Kōsei Okazawa (岡澤 昂星, Okazawa Kōsei; born 22 October 2003) is a Japanese professional footballer who plays as a defensive midfielder for Cerezo Osaka.

== Career statistics ==
=== Club ===
As of 23 July 2023.

Appearances and goals by club, season and competition
Club	Season	League			National Cup (Note: Includes Emperor's Cup)		League Cup (Note: Includes J.League Cup)		Other		Total	
Club	Season	Division	Apps	Goals	Apps	Goals	Apps	Goals	Apps	Goals	Apps	Goals
Cerezo Osaka U-23	2020	J3 League	30	0	–		–		0	0	30	0
Cerezo Osaka	2022	J1 League	0	0	3	0	3	1	0	0	6	1
Red Bull Bragantino (loan)	2022	Série A	0	0	0	0	0	0	0	0	0	0
FC Ryukyu (loan)	2023	J3 League	0	0	0	0	0	0	0	0	0	0
Career total			30	0	3	0	3	1	0	0	36	1
