= Kodai Dohi =

Japanese footballer

Kodai Dohi 土肥 航大
Personal information
- Full name: Kodai Dohi
- Date of birth: 13 April 2001 (age 25)
- Place of birth: Sakai, Osaka, Japan
- Height: 1.79 m (5 ft 10 in)
- Position: Attacking midfielder

Team information
- Current team: Jurong
- Number: 8

Youth career
- Rip Ace SC
- –2019: Sanfrecce Hiroshima

Senior career*
Years	Team	Apps	(Gls)
2019–	Sanfrecce Hiroshima	19	(0)
2022	→ Mito Hollyhock (loan)	26	(2)
2023	→ Ventforet Kofu (loan)	3	(0)
2023	→ FC Imabari (loan)	18	(0)
2024	Tochigi SC (loan)	2	(0)
2024	FC Imabari (loan)	3	(0)
2025	Gainare Tottori	6	(0)
2026	FC Osaka	9	(0)
2026–	Jurong	0	(0)

International career
2019	Japan U18	3	(0)
- * Club domestic league appearances and goals as of 9 May 2026

Kodai Dohi (土肥 航大, Dohi Kōdai; born 13 April 2001) is a Japanese professional footballer who plays as an attacking midfielder for Singapore Premier League club Jurong.

== Club career ==
Dohi was born in Osaka Prefecture on 13 April 2001. He joined J1 League club Sanfrecce Hiroshima from youth team in 2019. On 22 May he debuted as substitute midfielder against Melbourne Victory FC at AFC Champions League.

== Career statistics ==
=== Club ===
As of start of the 2023 season

Club	Season	League			National Cup		League Cup		Other		Total	
Club	Season	Division	Apps	Goals	Apps	Goals	Apps	Goals	Apps	Goals	Apps	Goals
Japan			League		Emperor's Cup		J.League Cup		Other		Total	
Sanfrecce Hiroshima	2019	J1 League	0	0	0	0	0	0	1 (Note: Appearances in the AFC Champions League)	0	1	0
Sanfrecce Hiroshima	2020	J1 League	13	0	0	0	1	0	–		14	0
Sanfrecce Hiroshima	2021	J1 League	6	0	1	0	2	0	–		9	0
Sanfrecce Hiroshima	Total		19	0	1	0	3	0	1	0	24	0
Mito Hollyhock (loan)	2022	J2 League	26	2	1	0	–		–		27	2
Ventforet Kofu (loan)	2023	J2 League	0	0	0	0	–		–		0	0
Career total			45	2	2	0	3	0	1	0	51	2
