= Cerezo Osaka =

Association football club based in Osaka, Japan

Cerezo Osaka セレッソ大阪
- Full name: Cerezo Osaka
- Nickname: Sakura (Cherry Blossoms)
- Founded: 1957; 69 years ago as Yanmar Diesel SC
- Stadium: Yanmar Hanasaka Stadium
- Capacity: 24,481
- Owner: Yanmar
- Chairman: Hiroaki Morishima
- Manager: Pablo Machín
- League: J1 League
- 2026: J1 League, 3rd of 20
- Website: cerezo.co.jp
| Home colours | Away colours |

Cerezo Osaka (セレッソ大阪, Seresso Ōsaka) is a Japanese professional football club based in Osaka. The club currently plays in the J1 League, which is the top tier of football in the country. The club's name (Spanish: Cerezo, lit. 'cherry blossom') also represents the flower of the city of Osaka. The official hometowns of the club are Osaka and Sakai. There exists a local rivalry with Suita-based Gamba Osaka.

The club excels at player development; many players—most notably Shinji Kagawa and Takumi Minamino—have moved from this club to Europe and gone on to shine at top-tier clubs.

Cerezo have won 4 Emperor's Cup, 1 J.League Cup and 2 Japanese Super Cup titles in the club history.

== History ==
=== Beginnings (1957–1992) ===
The club, originally called Yanmar Diesel, started in 1957 as the company team of Yanmar and was an original founder ("Original Eight" (Note: The original clubs of the Japan Soccer League in 1965 were Mitsubishi Motors, Furukawa Electric, Hitachi, Yanmar, Toyo Kogyo, Yahata Steel, Toyota Industries and Nagoya Mutual Bank.)) of the now-disbanded Japan Soccer League (JSL) in 1965.

With four Japanese league titles to its credit, it was a mainstay of the JSL Division 1 until 1990 when it was first relegated, and joined the former Japan Football League (JFL) in 1992. Yanmar Diesel enjoyed considerable success during the 1960s and 1970s, winning multiple league titles.

=== Privatised and registered under a new name (1993–present) ===
With the establishment of the professional J.League in 1993, the club initially did not join the new top division. In 1994, the team was restructured and rebranded as Cerezo Osaka, adopting its current identity and representing the city of Osaka after a public contest.

In 1994, they won the Japan Football League championship and was promoted to the J1 League in 1995. This also coincided with a run to the finals of the Emperor's Cup, which they lost to Bellmare Hiratsuka.

Cerezo joined the J1 League in 1995, beginning in the top division. The club quickly established itself as a competitive side and finished as runners-up in the 2000 and 2005 J1 League seasons, narrowly missing out on the title on both occasions. During this period, Cerezo became known for developing talented players, including several who would go on to represent the Japan national team. Despite their strong performances, the club was unable to secure a major trophy, contributing to a reputation for near misses.

=== Relegation and fluctuations (2006–2016) ===
Following their near-title success in 2005, Cerezo experienced a period of instability. The club was relegated from the J1 League in 2006, marking the beginning of a cycle of promotion and relegation between the top two divisions. Despite these challenges, Cerezo continued to produce notable talents, including future global superstar, Shinji Kagawa, who emerged from the club’s youth system and later achieved success in Europe. The club also had spells of strong performance upon returning to J1, but consistency remained an issue.

=== Taste of silverware (2017–2018) ===
A major turning point came in 2017 when Cerezo achieved the most successful season in its history. The club won both won the 2017 J.League Cup, and the 2017 Emperor's Cup, securing their first major domestic trophies. On 4 November 2017, Cerezo won their first major title in their club history, defeating Kawasaki Frontale 2–0 in the J.League Cup final. On 1 January 2018, Cerezo won the 2017 Emperor's Cup, securing their second major title. The final match was against Yokohama F. Marinos, where Cerezo won 2–1 in extra time with Kota Mizunuma scoring the winner.

The success continued in 2018 where on 10 February 2018, Cerezo won the 2018 Japanese Super Cup winning 3–2 against Kawasaki Frontale, further establishing themselves as a competitive force in domestic football. In May 2018, the club changed its incorporated name from Osaka Football Club Co., Ltd. to Cerezo Osaka Co., Ltd.

=== Stabilisation in the top flight (2019–2024) ===
Following their cup successes, Cerezo Osaka entered a period of relative stability in the J1 League. The club consistently finished in mid- to upper-table positions and remained competitive in domestic competitions. Cerezo continued to focus on youth development and attacking football, while also integrating experienced players into the squad. Although they did not add further major trophies during this period, the club maintained its reputation as a well-run and competitive side within Japanese football.

In 2022, the club got close to winning the J.League Cup for their second title, but blew a 1–0 lead to Sanfrecce Hiroshima in injury time after Hiroshima player Pieros Sotiriou scored two goals in the 96th and 101st minutes of the match to give the opponent the J.League Cup.

On 1 February 2023, Cerezo signed their boyhood academy player and former Borussia Dortmund and Manchester United player, Shinji Kagawa on a two-years contract.

=== Continued competitiveness (2025–present) ===
In 2025, Cerezo remained an established club in the J1 League, competing regularly in the top half of the table. The team continued to develop young talents while maintaining a balanced squad capable of challenging stronger opponents.

Although a league title remained elusive, Cerezo consistent performances and emphasis on player development ensured their continued relevance in Japanese football. The club also remained competitive in domestic cup competitions, aiming to replicate the successes achieved in 2017.

== Team image ==
=== Mascots ===
The club's mascots are a wolf named Lobby (from Spanish lobo, meaning wolf) and Madame Lobina, Lobby's mother.

On February 22, 2020, host and TV personality Roland was appointed Cerezo's "Official CereMan".

=== Rivalries ===
Cerezo's biggest rival is fellow Osaka club Gamba Osaka. The matches played between Cerezo and Gamba are referred to as the Osaka derby.

=== In popular culture ===
In the manga series Captain Tsubasa, a character named Teppei Kisugi becomes a professional football player and joins Cerezo Osaka.

== Stadium ==
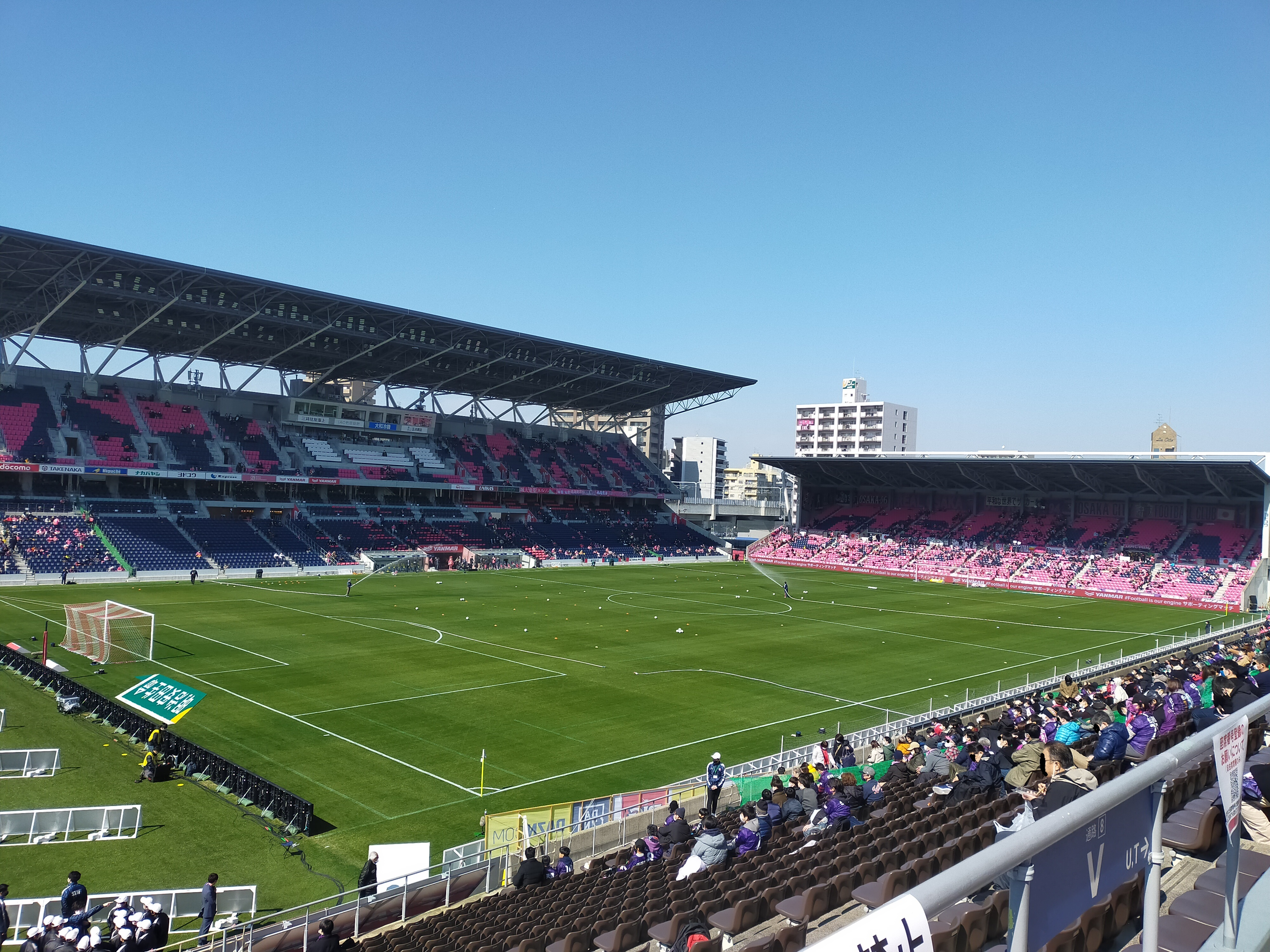
Yodoko Sakura Stadium

The hometowns of the club are Osaka and Sakai. Yodoko Sakura Stadium, is the home ground of Cerezo Osaka. Located within Nagai Park in Osaka, the stadium has served as the club’s primary venue since its opening in 1987. It has a seating capacity of approximately 24,481 spectators and is designed specifically for football, providing an intimate atmosphere with stands close to the pitch.

The stadium was extensively renovated between 2019 and 2021 to modernise its facilities and enhance the matchday experience. In addition to league matches in the J1 League, the stadium has hosted fixtures in domestic cup competitions such as the Emperor's Cup and the J.League Cup. Its football-specific design and modern facilities have made it one of the prominent venues in Japanese club football.

Cerezo Osaka has also occasionally used the nearby Nagai Stadium for matches requiring a larger capacity, particularly during high-profile fixtures, such as derby matches and cup ties.

=== Training ground ===
The club practices at Minami Tsumori Sakura Sports Park, Maishima Sports Island, and Amagasaki Yanmar Diesel Ground.

== Kit suppliers and shirt sponsors ==
Cerezo's club colour is pink, like the cherry blossoms that the club's name is based on. Combination colours have been navy blue and black. This year, the uniform colour is pink (home) and white (away) for the outfield players and black (home), pink (away) and green for the goalkeepers.

During the Yanmar Diesel days in the late 1970s to mid-1980s, the uniform was all-red reminiscent Mexican club Deportivo Toluca.

=== Sponsors ===
| Period | Kit manufacturer | Main sponsors |
|---|---|---|
| 1983–2005 | (Japan) Mizuno | (Japan) Nippon Ham |
| 2006–2014 | (Japan) Mizuno | (Japan) Yanmar |
| 2015–2024 | (Germany) Puma | (Japan) Yanmar |
| 2025–present | (Japan) Mizuno | (Japan) Yanmar |

=== Kit evolution ===
Home Kits - 1st
| 1994 - 1996 | 1997 - 1998 | 1999 - 2003 | 2004 - 2005 | 2006 - 2007 |
| 2008 - 2009 | 2010 | 2011 | 2012 | 2013 |
| 2014 | 2015 | 2016 | 2017 | 2018 |
| 2019 | 2020 | 2021 | 2022 | 2023 |
| 2024 | 2025 | 2026 - | | |

Away Kits - 2nd
| 1994 - 1996 | 1997 - 1998 | 1999 - 2002 | 2003 - 2004 | 2005 |
| 2006 | 2007 | 2008 | 2009 | 2010 |
| 2011 | 2012 | 2013 | 2014 | 2015 |
| 2016 | 2017 | 2018 | 2019 | 2020 |
| 2021 | 2022 | 2023 | 2024 | 2025 |
2026 -

Special Kits - 3rd
| 2010; 88 Memorial | 2011; Eight Summer | 2012; Summer; Uniform | 2013; Yanmar Premium Cup | 2014; 20th Anniversary |
| 2015; Kincho Stadium 5th Anniversary | 2016; Summer | 2017; Summer | 2018; ACL | 2018; Limited |
| 2019; 25th Anniversary | 2020; Limited | 2021; ACL 1st | 2021; ACL 2nd | 2021; Limited |
| 2022; Limited | 2023; Limited | 2024; Limited; 30th Anniversary Celebration | 2025; Limited; Blossom | |

== Affiliated clubs ==
- (Thailand) BG Pathum United (March 2012–present)
- (Germany) Borussia Dortmund (January 2026–present)

== Players ==
=== First-team squad ===
As of 28 August 2026.

Note: Flags indicate national team as defined under FIFA eligibility rules; some limited exceptions apply. Players may hold more than one non-FIFA nationality.

| No. | Pos. | Nation | Player |
|---|---|---|---|
| 1 | GK | JPN | Go Kambayashi |
| 2 | DF | JPN | Takumi Nakamura |
| 4 | DF | JPN | Rikito Inoue |
| 6 | DF | JPN | Kyōhei Noborizato |
| 7 | MF | JPN | Satoki Uejō |
| 8 | MF | JPN | Shinji Kagawa (captain) |
| 9 | FW | JPN | Solomon Sakuragawa |
| 10 | MF | JPN | Shunta Tanaka (captain) |
| 11 | FW | BRA | Thiago Andrade |
| 14 | MF | JPN | Yumeki Yokoyama |
| 15 | DF | ESP | Javi Hernández (on loan from Leganés) |
| 16 | DF | JPN | Hayato Okuda |
| 17 | MF | JPN | Reiya Sakata |
| 19 | FW | SYR | Pablo Sabbag |
| 23 | GK | JPN | Kōsuke Nakamura |

| No. | Pos. | Nation | Player |
|---|---|---|---|
| 27 | DF | MAS | Dion Cools |
| 28 | MF | JPN | Kōsei Okazawa |
| 31 | GK | JPN | Koto Abe (on loan from Júbilo Iwata) |
| 33 | DF | JPN | Seinosuke Kimura ^{DSP} |
| 36 | MF | AUS | Jackson Irvine |
| 41 | FW | JPN | Yōta Komi |
| 42 | MF | JPN | Teppei Shiojiri ^{Type 2} |
| 43 | DF | JPN | Chimezie Kai Ezemokwe ^{Type 2} |
| 44 | DF | JPN | Shinnosuke Hatanaka (captain) |
| 45 | FW | JPN | Koki Nagasoe ^{Type 2} |
| 46 | GK | JPN | Ken Isibor |
| 48 | MF | JPN | Masaya Shibayama |
| 66 | DF | JPN | Ayumu Ōhata |
| 77 | MF | BRA | Lucas Fernandes |
| 97 | DF | JPN | Travis Takahashi |

=== Out on loan ===
Note: Flags indicate national team as defined under FIFA eligibility rules; some limited exceptions apply. Players may hold more than one non-FIFA nationality.

| No. | Pos. | Nation | Player |
|---|---|---|---|
| — | MF | JPN | Kaito Konomi (at Hokkaido Consadole Sapporo) |
| — | FW | JPN | Wigi Kanemoto (at Fujieda MYFC) |
| — | DF | JPN | Niko Takahashi (at (Germany) Holstein Kiel) |

| No. | Pos. | Nation | Player |
|---|---|---|---|
| — | FW | JPN | Kengo Furuyama (at FC Imabari) |
| — | GK | KOR | Kim Jin-hyeon (at Tochigi City FC) |
| — | MF | JPN | Eiji Kubo (at Reilac Shiga) |

== Management and staff ==
Club officials for 2026.

| Position | Name |
|---|---|
| Manager | (Spain) Pablo Machín |
| Assistant manager | (Spain) Jose Schneider |
| Coaches | (Japan) Yasuaki Oshima (Japan) Ryo Shigaki (Japan) Rui Komatsu (Japan) Shuta Tsukamoto |
| Analytical coach | (Japan) Shunsuke Nakano (Japan) Yuki Yoshimura |
| Goalkeeping coach | (Japan) Koji Inada (Japan) Sasakata Kazuko |
| Head of performance | (Japan) Yusuke Fukuhara |
| Physical coach | (Japan) Takeshi Ikoma |
| Athletic performance coach | (Japan) Tanaka Yusuke |
| Physiotherapists | (Japan) Atsushi Kitaura (Japan) Akihiro Sasaki |
| Trainers | (Japan) Koji Hanaki (Japan) Haruki Wada |
| Interpreters | (Japan) Takanori Shirasawa (Japan) Kazuyuki Ishikawa (Japan) Bruno Hideo Owada (Japan) Murray Shion |
| Chief secretary | (Japan) Atsushi Imanishi |
| Team secretary | (Japan) Shoki Kokawa (South Korea) Lee Song-in |
| Kitman | (Japan) Tomoharu Nagahisa |

== Honours ==
As both Yanmar Diesel (1957–1993) and Cerezo Osaka (1993–present)

| Type | Honours | Titles | Season |
|---|---|---|---|
| League | Japan Soccer League Division 1 | 4 | 1971, 1974, 1975, 1980 |
| League | Japan Soccer League Cup | 3 | 1973 (shared), 1983, 1984 |
| League | All Japan Senior Football Championship | 1 | 1976 |
| League | Japan Football League | 1 | 1994 |
| Cup | Emperor's Cup | 4 | 1968, 1970, 1974, 2017 |
| Cup | J.League Cup | 1 | 2017 |
| Cup | Japanese Super Cup | 2 | 1981, 2018 |
| Regional | Queen's Cup | 1 | 1976 |

== Records and statistics ==
As of 18 March 2026.

Top 10 all-time appearances
| Rank | Player | Years | Club appearance |
|---|---|---|---|
| 1 | (South Korea) Kim Jin-hyeon | 2009–present | 638 |
| 2 | (Japan) Hiroaki Morishima | 1991–2008 | 532 |
| 3 | (Japan) Yusuke Maruhashi | 2009–2023 | 485 |
| 4 | (Japan) Noriyuki Sakemoto | 2003–2018 | 356 |
| 5 | (Japan) Akinori Nishizawa | 1995–2000, 2001, 2002–2006, 2009 | 353 |
| 6 | (Japan) Yoichiro Kakitani | 2006–2014, 2016–2021 | 308 |
| 7 | (Japan) Riku Matsuda | 2016–2024 | 298 |
| 8 | (Japan) Hiroshi Kiyotake | 2010–2012, 2017–2024 | 294 |
| 9 | (Japan) Tatsuya Yamashita | 2006–2010, 2012–2019, 2022–2024 | 291 |
| 10 | (Japan) Hotaru Yamaguchi | 2009–2015, 2016–2018 | 279 |
| 10 | (Japan) Kota Fujimoto | 2005–2019 | 279 |

Top 10 all-time scorers
| Rank | Player | Club appearance | Total goals |
|---|---|---|---|
| 1 | (Japan) Hiroaki Morishima | 532 | 161 |
| 2 | (Japan) Akinori Nishizawa | 353 | 113 |
| 3 | (Japan) Yoichiro Kakitani | 308 | 75 |
| 4 | (Japan) Yoshito Ōkubo | 175 | 71 |
| 5 | (Japan) Kenyu Sugimoto | 239 | 70 |
| 6 | (Japan) Shinji Kagawa | 222 | 65 |
| 7 | (Japan) Tatsuya Furuhashi | 170 | 53 |
| 8 | (Japan) Hiroshi Kiyotake | 294 | 48 |
| 9 | (Japan) Takashi Inui | 151 | 46 |
| 10 | (Japan) Rui Komatsu | 165 | 44 |

- Biggest wins: 11–0 vs Ventforet Kofu (22 May1994)
- Heaviest defeats: 0–11 vs Sanfrecce Hiroshima (7 November 1965)
- Youngest ever debutant: Yoichiro Kakitani ~ 16 years 10 months 23 days old (On 26 November 2006 vs Omiya Ardija)
- Oldest ever player: Yoshito Ōkubo ~ 39 years 6 months 3 days old (On 12 December 2021 vs Urawa Red Diamonds)
- Youngest goal scorers: Yoichiro Kakitani ~ 17 years 3 months 25 days old (On 28 April 2007 vs Thespa Gunma)
- Oldest goal scorers: Yoshito Ōkubo ~ 39 years 2 months 30 days old (On 8 September 2021 vs Hokkaido Consadole Sapporo)

== Award winners ==
As of the end of the 2025 season.

- J.League Top Scorer:

- (South Korea) Hwang Sun-hong (1999)

- J.League Best XI

- (Japan) Hiroaki Morishima (1995, 2000)
- (Japan) Akinori Nishizawa (2000)
- (Japan) Motohiro Yoshida (2005)
- (Japan) Tatsuya Furuhashi (2005)
- (Japan) Hiroshi Kiyotake (2006)
- (Japan) Yoichiro Kakitani (2013)
- (Japan) Hotaru Yamaguchi (2013, 2017)
- (Japan) Kenyu Sugimoto (2017)
- (Japan) Seiya Maikuma (2023)

- J.League Best Young Player:

- (Japan) Takumi Minamino (2013)
- (Japan) Ayumu Seko (2020)

- Individual Fair Play Award:
  - (Japan) Yoichiro Kakitani (2013, 2017)
- J.League Goal of the Year:

- (Japan) Yoichiro Kakitani against Kashima Antlers (30 November 2013)

- J.League Manager of the Year:

- (South Korea) Yoon Jong-hwan (2017)

- J2 League Top Scorer:
  - (Japan) Shinji Kagawa (2009)

== Managerial history ==
| Manager | Period | Honours |
|---|---|---|
| (Brazil) Paulo Emilio | 1 January 1994–31 December 1995 | – 1994 Japan Football League |
| (Japan) Hiroshi Sowa | 1 January 1996–31 December 1996 | |
| (Brazil) Levir Culpi | 1 February 1997–31 December 1997 | |
| (Japan) Yasutaro Matsuki | 1 January 1998–31 December 1999 | |
| René Desaeyere | 1 February 1999–31 January 2000 | |
| (Japan) Hiroshi Soejima | 1 February 2000–19 August 2001 | |
| (Brazil) João Carlos | 20 August 2001–4 November 2001 | |
| (Japan) Akihiro Nishimura | 5 November 2001–6 October 2003 | |
| (Japan) Yuji Tsukada | 7 October 2003–1 January 2004 | |
| (Croatia) Petar Nadoveza | 2 January 2004–1 February 2004 | |
| (Bosnia and Herzegovina) Fuad Muzurović | 1 February 2004–22 March 2004 | |
| (Croatia) Albert Pobor | 23 March 2004–28 June 2004 | |
| (Japan) Shinji Kobayashi | 1 July 2004–17 April 2006 | |
| (Japan) Yuji Tsukada (2) | 18 April 2006–31 December 2006 | |
| (Japan) Satoshi Tsunami | 1 January 2007–7 May 2007 | |
| (Brazil) Levir Culpi (2) | 8 May 2007–31 December 2011 | |
| (Brazil) Sérgio Soares | 1 January 2012–26 August 2012 | |
| (Brazil) Levir Culpi (3) | 27 August 2012–11 December 2013 | |
| (Serbia) Ranko Popović | 1 January 2014–9 June 2014 | |
| (Germany) Marco Pezzaiuoli | 16 June 2014–8 September 2014 | |
| (Japan) Yuji Okuma | 8 September 2014–16 December 2014 | |
| (Brazil) Paulo Autuori | 1 January 2015–17 November 2015 | |
| (Japan) Kiyoshi Okuma | 17 November 2015–31 January 2017 | |
| (South Korea) Yoon Jong-hwan | 1 February 2017–31 December 2018 | – 2017 Emperor's Cup – 2017 J.League Cup – 2018 Japanese Super Cup |
| (Spain) Miguel Ángel Lotina | 1 February 2019–31 January 2021 | |
| (Brazil) Levir Culpi (4) | 1 February 2021–26 August 2021 | |
| (Japan) Akio Kogiku | 26 August 2021–11 October 2024 | |
| (Australia) Arthur Papas | 17 December 2024–3 July 2026 | |
| (Spain) Pablo Machin | 3 July 2026–present | |

== Season by season record ==
| Champions | Runners-up | Third place | Promoted | Relegated |

| League | | | | | | | | | | | | | J.League Cup | Emperor's Cup | ACL |
| Season | Div. | Teams | Pos. | P | W(OTW/PKW) | D | L(OTL/PKL) | F | A | GD | Pts | Attendance/G | J.League Cup | Emperor's Cup | ACL |
|---|---|---|---|---|---|---|---|---|---|---|---|---|---|---|---|
| 1995 | J1 | 14 | 8th | 52 | 25(0/0) | - | 11(0/2) | 43 | 44 | -1 | 41 | 12,097 | – | 2nd round | Did not qualify |
| 1996 | J1 | 16 | 13th | 30 | 10 | - | 20 | 38 | 56 | -18 | 30 | 8,229 | Group stage | Round of 16 | Did not qualify |
| 1997 | J1 | 17 | 11th | 32 | 13(1/2) | - | 10(5/1) | 53 | 56 | -3 | 43 | 9,153 | Group stage | Round of 16 | Did not qualify |
| 1998 | J1 | 18 | 9th | 34 | 14(1/0) | - | 17(1/1) | 56 | 79 | -23 | 44 | 9,864 | Group stage | 3rd round | Did not qualify |
| 1999 | J1 | 16 | 6th | 30 | 15(4/0) | - | 10(1/0) | 64 | 45 | 19 | 53 | 10,216 | 2nd round | Round of 16 | Did not qualify |
| 2000 | J1 | 16 | 5th | 30 | 14(3/0) | - | 11(2/0) | 54 | 49 | 5 | 48 | 13,548 | 2nd round | Quarter-finals | Did not qualify |
| 2001 | J1 | 16 | 16th | 30 | 5(3/0) | 2 | 18(0/0) | 41 | 70 | -29 | 21 | 11,857 | 1st round | Runners-up | Did not qualify |
| 2002 | J2 | 12 | 2nd | 44 | 25 | 12 | 7 | 93 | 53 | 40 | 87 | 7,952 | Not eligible | Round of 16 | Did not qualify |
| 2003 | J1 | 16 | 9th | 30 | 12 | 4 | 14 | 55 | 56 | -1 | 40 | 13,854 | Group stage | Runners-up | Did not qualify |
| 2004 | J1 | 16 | 15th | 30 | 6 | 8 | 16 | 42 | 64 | -22 | 26 | 14,323 | Group stage | 4th round | Did not qualify |
| 2005 | J1 | 18 | 5th | 34 | 16 | 11 | 7 | 48 | 40 | 8 | 59 | 17,648 | Quarter-finals | Semi-finals | Did not qualify |
| 2006 | J1 | 18 | 17th | 34 | 6 | 9 | 19 | 44 | 70 | -26 | 27 | 13,026 | Quarter-finals | 4th round | Did not qualify |
| 2007 | J2 | 13 | 5th | 48 | 24 | 8 | 16 | 72 | 55 | 17 | 80 | 6,627 | Not eligible | 4th round | Did not qualify |
| 2008 | J2 | 15 | 4th | 42 | 21 | 6 | 15 | 81 | 60 | 21 | 69 | 10,554 | Not eligible | 4th round | Did not qualify |
| 2009 | J2 | 18 | 2nd | 51 | 31 | 11 | 9 | 100 | 53 | 47 | 104 | 9,912 | Not eligible | 2nd round | Did not qualify |
| 2010 | J1 | 18 | 3rd | 34 | 17 | 10 | 7 | 51 | 31 | 20 | 61 | 15,026 | Group stage | Round of 16 | Did not qualify |
| 2011 | J1 | 18 | 12th | 34 | 11 | 10 | 13 | 67 | 53 | 14 | 43 | 14,145 | Quarter final | Semi-finals | Quarter-finals |
| 2012 | J1 | 18 | 14th | 34 | 11 | 9 | 14 | 47 | 53 | -6 | 42 | 16,815 | Quarter-finals | Quarter-finals | Did not qualify |
| 2013 | J1 | 18 | 4th | 34 | 16 | 11 | 7 | 53 | 32 | 21 | 59 | 18,819 | Quarter-finals | Round of 16 | Did not qualify |
| 2014 | J1 | 18 | 17th | 34 | 7 | 10 | 17 | 36 | 48 | -12 | 31 | 21,627 | Quarter-finals | Quarter-finals | Round of 16 |
| 2015 | J2 | 22 | 4th | 42 | 18 | 13 | 11 | 57 | 40 | 17 | 67 | 12,232 | Not eligible | 1st round | Did not qualify |
| 2016 | J2 | 22 | 4th | 42 | 23 | 9 | 10 | 62 | 46 | 16 | 78 | 12,509 | Not eligible | 3rd round | Did not qualify |
| 2017 | J1 | 18 | 3rd | 34 | 19 | 6 | 9 | 64 | 43 | 22 | 63 | 20,970 | Winner | Winner | Did not qualify |
| 2018 | J1 | 18 | 7th | 34 | 13 | 11 | 10 | 39 | 38 | 1 | 50 | 18,542 | Quarter final | Round of 16 | Group stage |
| 2019 | J1 | 18 | 5th | 34 | 18 | 5 | 11 | 39 | 29 | 14 | 59 | 21,518 | Play-offs | Round of 16 | Did not qualify |
| 2020 † | J1 | 18 | 4th | 34 | 18 | 6 | 10 | 46 | 37 | 9 | 60 | 7,014 | Quarter final | Did not qualify | Did not qualify |
| 2021 † | J1 | 20 | 12th | 38 | 13 | 9 | 16 | 47 | 51 | -4 | 48 | 5,351 | Runners up | Semi-finals | Round of 16 |
| 2022 | J1 | 18 | 5th | 34 | 13 | 12 | 9 | 46 | 40 | 6 | 51 | 11,427 | Runners up | Quarter-finals | Did not qualify |
| 2023 | J1 | 18 | 9th | 34 | 15 | 4 | 15 | 39 | 34 | 5 | 49 | 17,074 | Group stage | Round of 16 | Did not qualify |
| 2024 | J1 | 20 | 10th | 38 | 13 | 13 | 12 | 43 | 48 | -5 | 52 | 17,903 | Playoff round | 3rd round | Did not qualify |
| 2025 | J1 | 20 | 10th | 38 | 14 | 10 | 14 | 60 | 55 | -5 | 52 | 18,654 | Playoff round | 4th round | Did not qualify |
| 2026 | J1 | 10 | TBD | 18 | | | | | | | | | N/A | N/A | |
| 2026-27 | J1 | 20 | TBD | 38 | | | | | | | | | TBD | TBD | |

Key

- Pos. = Position in league; P = Games played; W = Games won; D = Games drawn; L = Games lost; F = Goals scored; A = Goals conceded; GD = Goals difference; Pts = Points gained
- Attendance/G = Average league home attendance
- † 2020 & 2021 seasons attendances reduced due to COVID-19 worldwide pandemic
- Source: J.League Data Site

== Continental record ==
As of 24 June 2021

| Season | Competition | Round | Club | Home | Away | Aggregate |
|---|---|---|---|---|---|---|
| 2011 | AFC Champions League | Group G | (Indonesia) Arema Malang | 2–1 | 4–0 | 2nd |
| 2011 | AFC Champions League | Group G | (China) Shandong Luneng Taishan | 4–0 | 0–2 | 2nd |
| 2011 | AFC Champions League | Group G | (South Korea) Jeonbuk Hyundai Motors | 1–0 | 0–1 | 2nd |
| 2011 | AFC Champions League | Round of 16 | (Japan) Gamba Osaka | 1–0 | | |
| 2011 | AFC Champions League | Quarter-finals | (South Korea) Jeonbuk Hyundai Motors | 4–3 | 1–6 | 5–9 |
| 2014 | AFC Champions League | Group F | (South Korea) Pohang Steelers | 0–2 | 1–1 | 2nd |
| 2014 | AFC Champions League | Group F | (China) Shandong Taishan | 1–3 | 2–1 | 2nd |
| 2014 | AFC Champions League | Group F | (Thailand) Buriram United | 4–0 | 2–2 | 2nd |
| 2014 | AFC Champions League | Round of 16 | (China) Guangzhou | 1–5 | 1–0 | 2–5 |
| 2018 | AFC Champions League | Group G | (South Korea) Jeju United | 2–1 | 1–0 | 3rd |
| 2018 | AFC Champions League | Group G | (China) Guangzhou | 0–0 | 1–3 | 3rd |
| 2018 | AFC Champions League | Group G | (Thailand) Buriram United | 2–2 | 0–2 | 3rd |
| 2021 | AFC Champions League | Play-off round | (Australia) Melbourne City | Cancelled | | |
| 2021 | AFC Champions League | Group J | (China) Guangzhou | 5–0 (Note: Played at a neutral venue.) | 2–0 | 1st |
| 2021 | AFC Champions League | Group J | (Hong Kong) Kitchee | 2–1 | 0–0 | 1st |
| 2021 | AFC Champions League | Group J | (Thailand) Port | 1–1 | 3–0 | 1st |
| 2021 | AFC Champions League | Round of 16 | (South Korea) Pohang Steelers | 0–1 | | |

== League history ==
- Japan Soccer League Division 1: 1965–1990 (as Yanmar Diesel)
- Japan Soccer League Division 2: 1991 (as Yanmar Diesel)
- Japan Football League Division 1: 1992–94 (as Yanmar Diesel until 1993; Cerezo Osaka since 1994)
- J1 League: 1995–2001
- J2 League: 2002
- J1 League: 2003–2006
- J2 League: 2007–2009
- J1 League: 2010–2014
- J2 League: 2015–2016
- J1 League: 2017–present
