= 2026–27 J1 League =

34th season of the J1 League

J1 League
- Season: 2026–27
- Dates: 7 August 2026 – 6 June 2027
- Matches: 150
- Goals: 431 (2.87 per match)
- Top goalscorer: (Brazil) Léo Ceará (Kashima Antlers) (12 goals)
- Biggest home win: FC Tokyo 6–0 Mito HollyHock (25 October 2026)
- Biggest away win: Shimizu S-Pulse 0–5 Machida Zelvia (21 October 2026)
- Highest scoring: Yokohama F. Marinos 3–4 Kashima Antlers (7 August 2026); Gamba Osaka 4–3 Urawa Reds (7 August 2026); Sanfrecce Hiroshima 6–1 Cerezo Osaka (12 September 2026)
- Longest winning run: 5 FC Tokyo, Vissel Kobe
- Longest unbeaten run: 13; FC Tokyo
- Longest winless run: 11; Tokyo Verdy
- Longest losing run: 8 Mito HollyHock
- All statistics correct as of 21 November 2026.

The 2026–27 J1 League, also known as the 2026/27 Meiji Yasuda J1 League (Japanese: 2026/27シーズン 明治安田J1リーグ, Hepburn: 2026/27 Shīzun Meiji Yasuda J1 Rīgu) for sponsorship reasons, is the 34th season of J1 League, the top Japanese professional league for association football clubs, since its establishment in 1992. This is the 12th season of the league since its rebrand from J.League Division 1 and the first to have encompassed two calendar years, having switched from the single-year season format.

Kashima Antlers are the defending champions, having won a record-extending ninth J.League title on the last matchday of the 2025 season. It was their record-breaking ninth top flight title, their first trophy since winning the 2018 AFC Champions League, and the first league title since 2016.

== Overview ==
This is the first J.League season played in two calendar years from summer to spring, having always played in a whole calendar year from late winter to early winter since its inaugural season in 1993.

== Changes from the previous season ==
Three teams were relegated to the 2026–27 J2 League. Yokohama FC, Shonan Bellmare, and Albirex Niigata, were relegated as they finished 18th, 19th, and 20th respectively in the 2025 season, ending their one, eight, and three-year stays in the top flight respectively.

Three teams were promoted from the 2025 J2 League: Mito HollyHock, who won the title and play top flight football for the first time ever and second team from Ibaraki Prefecture in J1 League, V-Varen Nagasaki, who finished second, play only its second ever season in the J1 after seven seasons playing in the J2 League, and JEF United Chiba, who finished third and won the play-offs to play their first season in the top tier since their most recent relegation in 2008.

== Clubs ==
Locations of the teams
Teams in Keihanshin
Teams in Greater Tokyo Area
Teams in Tokyo and its immediate surrounding areas

Club	Location	Stadium	Capacity
Kashima Antlers	Ibaraki Prefecture	Mercari Stadium	39,095
Mito HollyHock	Ibaraki Prefecture	Mito Shinkin Bank Stadium	17,034
Urawa Red Diamonds	Saitama Prefecture	Saitama Stadium 2002	62,040
JEF United Chiba	Chiba Prefecture	Fukuda Denshi Arena	19,470
Kashiwa Reysol	Chiba Prefecture	Sankyo Frontier Kashiwa Stadium	15,109
FC Tokyo	Tokyo	Ajinomoto Stadium	47,851
Tokyo Verdy	Tokyo	Ajinomoto Stadium	47,851
Machida Zelvia	Tokyo	Machida GION Stadium	15,320
Kawasaki Frontale	Kanagawa Prefecture	Uvance Todoroki Stadium by Fujitsu	26,827
Yokohama F. Marinos	Kanagawa Prefecture	Nissan Stadium	71,624
Shimizu S-Pulse	Shizuoka Prefecture	IAI Stadium Nihondaira	19,594
Nagoya Grampus	Aichi Prefecture	Toyota Stadium	42,753
Kyoto Sanga	Kyoto Prefecture	Sanga Stadium by Kyocera	21,269
Gamba Osaka	Osaka Prefecture	Panasonic Stadium Suita	39,694
Cerezo Osaka	Osaka Prefecture	Yodoko Sakura Stadium	24,481
Vissel Kobe	Hyōgo Prefecture	Noevir Stadium Kobe	27,974
Fagiano Okayama	Okayama Prefecture	JFE Harenokuni Stadium	15,479
Sanfrecce Hiroshima	Hiroshima Prefecture	Edion Peace Wing Hiroshima	28,407
Avispa Fukuoka	Fukuoka Prefecture	Best Denki Stadium	21,546
V-Varen Nagasaki	Nagasaki Prefecture	Peace Stadium Connected by SoftBank	20,268

=== Personnel and kits ===
Club	Manager	Captain	Kit manufacturer	Kit sponsors	
Club	Manager	Captain	Kit manufacturer	Main	Other(s)
Avispa Fukuoka	(Japan) Hiroshi Jofuku	(Japan) Takumi Kamijima	(Japan) Yonex	Shin Nihon Seiyaku	List: Front: Agekke Corporation, Hakata Green Hotel; Back: Apaman Property, Septeni; Sleeves: Soft Service SSV Group, Fukuoka; Shorts: Pietro Dressings
Cerezo Osaka	(Spain) Pablo Machín	(Japan) Shunta Tanaka	(Japan) Mizuno	Yanmar	List: Front: Yodoko, Capcom; Back: Schau Essen; Sleeves: Nikkon Holdings, Osaka, Sakai; Shorts: None
Fagiano Okayama	(Japan) Takashi Kiyama	(Japan) Ryo Takeuchi	(Brazil) Penalty	GROP	List: Front: Ryobi Systems, Serio Inc.; Back: Chugoku Bank, Okanetsu; Sleeves: Okayama Shinkin Bank; Shorts: Sanyo Shimbun, Bisho Co., Ltd.
FC Tokyo	(Japan) Rikizo Matsuhashi	(Japan) Sei Muroya	(United States) New Balance	Tokyo Gas	List: Front: Mitsui & Co., Mixi; Back: Mitsubishi Corporation; Sleeves: Keio Corporation; Shorts: Mixi
Gamba Osaka	(Japan) Tomokazu Myojin	(Japan) Shinnosuke Nakatani	(Denmark) Hummel	Panasonic	List: Front: Daicel, Technics; Back: Rohto Pharmaceutical, Ship Healthcare; Sleeves: Toyo Tires, Osaka; Shorts: Suita
JEF United Chiba	(Japan) Yoshiyuki Kobayashi	(Japan) Daisuke Suzuki	(Denmark) Hummel	Fuji Electric	List: Front: JR East, Furukawa Electric; Back: Mobile Suica; Sleeves: TPX Abel; Shorts: Pepie
Kashima Antlers	(Japan) Toru Oniki	(Japan) Gaku Shibasaki	(United States) Nike	LIXIL	List: Front: Kaneka, Mercari; Back: YellowHat, Riso Kagaku Corporation; Sleeves: Nippon Steel; Shorts: Showa Sangyo, Takasago Thermal Engineering
Kashiwa Reysol	(Spain) Ricardo Rodríguez	(Japan) Taiyo Koga	(Japan) Yonex	Hitachi	List: Front: Sankyo Frontier, Hitachi Systems; Back: Aflac, Hitachi Building Systems; Sleeves: No Reysol, No Life, Hitachi Plant Services; Shorts: Lawson Ticket, Hitachi High-Tech Corporation
Kawasaki Frontale	(Japan) Shigetoshi Hasebe	(Japan) Yasuto Wakizaka	(Germany) Puma	Fujitsu	List: Front: Anker, Renosy; Back: SMBC Nikko Securities, PwC; Sleeves: Ebara Foods, Kawasaki; Shorts: Matsuo Komuten
Kyoto Sanga	(Serbia) Ranko Popović	(Brazil) Rafael Elias	(Germany) Puma	Kyocera	List: Front: Bank of Kyoto, Horiba; Back: Nintendo, au; Sleeves: Wacoal, Kyoto; Shorts: Daiwa Securities Group
Machida Zelvia	(Japan) Go Kuroda	(Japan) Gen Shoji	(Germany) Adidas	CyberAgent	List: Front: Rudel Inc., Avex; Back: Odakyu Electric Railway, Scalp D; Sleeves: Tamagawa University, Machida; Shorts: Daiwa Securities Group, Eagnle Kenso
Mito HollyHock	(Japan) Naoki Mori	(Japan) Arata Watanabe	(Japan) Soccer Junky	K's Holdings	List: Front: Landcros, and ST, HELTEC; Back: JX Advanced Metals; Sleeves: Taihei Dengyo, Mito, Hitachi, Hitachinaka, Kasama, Naka, Omitama, Hitachiota, Kitaibaraki, Hitachiomiya, Takahagi, Ibaraki, Shirosato, Oarai, Daigo, Tokai; Shorts: Sustainable Holdings, Daiwa Securities Group
Nagoya Grampus	(Serbia) Mihailo Petrović	(Japan) Sho Inagaki	(Japan) Mizuno	Toyota GR Corolla	List: Front: Workstaff Co., T-NET, my route (H) / Toyota Wallet (A); Back: Toyota Industries, Toyota Tsusho; Sleeves: Yahagi Engineering, Nagoya, Miyoshi; Shorts: ITOCO
Sanfrecce Hiroshima	(Germany) Bartosch Gaul	(Japan) Sho Sasaki	(United States) Nike	EDION	List: Front: Hisense, EDION Hikari; Back: Mazda, Hirogin Holdings; Sleeves: youme Town Hiroshima, One Ball, One World; Shorts: Teral Group, Mobile e Hoken
Shimizu S-Pulse	(Japan) Takayuki Yoshida	(United States) Jelani Reshaun Sumiyoshi	(Germany) Puma	Suzuyo (H & A) / Star Micronics (3rd)	List: Front: ITEC, Taica; Back: IAI, Harada Group; Sleeves: Japan Airlines, Shizuoka; Shorts: Taica, Suruga Giken Co.
Tokyo Verdy	(Japan) Naoki Soma	(Japan) Koki Morita	(Brazil) Athleta	Nicigas	List: Front: The Super Sports XEBIO; Back: Miroku Jyoho Service, Classmethod; Sleeves: Good Com Asset, Tokyo; Shorts: BRI Group
Urawa Red Diamonds	(South Korea) Cho Kwi-jae	(Japan) Shūsaku Nishikawa, (Japan) Yūta Miyamoto, (Japan) Takurō Kaneko, (Japan) Ryōma Watanabe	(United States) Nike	Polus	List: Front: Enecle; Back: Mitsubishi Heavy Industries; Sleeves: Mitsubishi Motors; Shorts: DHL, Mitsubishi Delica D5
Vissel Kobe	(Germany) Michael Skibbe	(Japan) Tetsushi Yamakawa	(Japan) Asics	Rakuten Mobile	List: Front: Danton, Debs; Back: Kawasaki, Henri Charpentier; Sleeves: Noevir, Kobe; Shorts: Digital Alliance Holdings (H) / Garden Plus (A)
V-Varen Nagasaki	(Japan) Takuya Takagi	(Japan) Hotaru Yamaguchi	(United States) Fanatics	Japanet	List: Front: Transcosmos, Memolead, Oshima Shipbuilding, Huis Ten Bosch; Back: MSC Cruises, MS&AD Insurance Group; Sleeves: Moririn, Fair and Just ~from Nagasaki to the world~, Nagasaki; Shorts:
Yokohama F. Marinos	(Australia) Steve Corica	(Japan) Takuya Kida	(Germany) Adidas	Nissan	List: Front: DRAFT; Back: Nisshin OilliO; Sleeves: Yokohama, Yokosuka, Yamato; Shorts: Morinaga In Jelly

=== Managerial changes ===
Team	Outgoing manager	Manner of departure	Date of vacancy	Position in the table	Incoming manager	Date of appointment
Yokohama F. Marinos	(Japan) Hideo Ōshima	Sacked	3 June 2026	Pre-season	(Australia) Steve Corica	21 June 2026
Kyoto Sanga	(Japan) Tatsuma Yoshida	End of interim spell	7 June 2026	Pre-season	(Serbia) Ranko Popović	8 June 2026
Urawa Reds	(Japan) Tatsuya Tanaka	End of interim spell	16 June 2026	Pre-season	(South Korea) Cho Kwi-jae	16 June 2026
Cerezo Osaka	(Australia) Arthur Papas	Resigned	3 July 2026	Pre-season	(Spain) Pablo Machín	3 July 2026
Gamba Osaka	(Germany) Jens Wissing	Resigned	10 July 2026	Pre-season	(Japan) Tomokazu Myojin	18 July 2026
Tokyo Verdy	(Japan) Hiroshi Jofuku	Sacked	5 October 2026	19th	(Japan) Naoki Soma	8 October 2026
Mito HollyHock	(Japan) Daisuke Kimori	Sacked	26 October 2026	17th	(Japan) Naoki Mori	26 October 2026
Avispa Fukuoka	(Japan) Shinya Tsukahara	Sacked	3 November 2026	20th	(Japan) Hiroshi Jofuku	6 November 2026

== Foreign players ==
From the 2019 season, there are no limitations on signing foreign players, but clubs can only register up to five of them for a single matchday squad. Players from J.League partner nations (Thailand, Vietnam, Morocco, Malaysia, Cambodia, Singapore, Indonesia) were exempted from these restrictions.

- Players name in **bold** indicates the player is registered during the mid-season transfer window.
- Player's name in italics indicates the player has Japanese nationality in addition to their FIFA nationality, holds the nationality of a J.League partner nation, or is exempt from being treated as a foreign player due to having been born in Japan and being enrolled in, or having graduated from an approved type of school in the country.

Club	Player 1	Player 2	Player 3	Player 4	Player 5	Player 6	Player 7	Player 8	Player 9	Player 10	Player 11	Former player (s)
Avispa Fukuoka	(Brazil) Werik Popó	(Spain) Oriol Romeu										
Cerezo Osaka	(Australia) Jackson Irvine	(Brazil) Lucas Fernandes	(Brazil) Thiago Andrade	(Malaysia) Dion Cools	(Spain) Javi Hernández	(Syria) Pablo Sabbag						
Fagiano Okayama	(Brazil) Kewin	(Brazil) Léo Gaúcho	(Brazil) Lucão	(Brazil) Oberdan	(Germany) Lennart Moser	(South Korea) Na Sang-ho						
FC Tokyo	(Brazil) Marcelo Ryan	(Denmark) Alexander Scholz	(Denmark) Nicolai Vallys	(South Korea) Kim Seung-gyu	(Spain) Dani Gómez							
Gamba Osaka	(Australia) Eli Adams	(Brazil) Welton	(China) Zhang Aolin	(Ivory Coast) Badra Camara	(Spain) Juanpe	(Tunisia) Issam Jebali	(Turkey) Deniz Hümmet					
JEF United Chiba	(Australia) Dan Hall	(Brazil) Dudu Pacheco	(Brazil) Erison	(Brazil) Matheus Índio	(Portugal) Leonardo Rocha	(Spain) José Aurelio Suárez						
Kashima Antlers	(Brazil) Élber	(Brazil) Léo Ceará	(Brazil) Matheus Bueno	(Brazil) Yan Matheus	(Serbia) Aleksandar Čavrić	(South Korea) Kim Tae-hyeon						
Kashiwa Reysol												
Kawasaki Frontale	(Brazil) Derik Lacerda	(Brazil) Kayke Queiroz	(Brazil) Marcinho	(Brazil) Pedro Romano	(China) Noriharu Kan	(China) Quan Tianhai	(Croatia) Filip Uremović	(Germany) Svend Brodersen	(Serbia) Lazar Romanić	(South Korea) Lee Keun-hyeong		
Kyoto Sanga	(Brazil) Alex Souza	(Brazil) David Silva	(Brazil) Everton Maceió	(Brazil) Halls	(Brazil) Henrique Trevisan	(Brazil) João Pedro	(Brazil) Marco Túlio	(Brazil) Rafael Elias	(Brazil) Thiago	(Brazil) Weverton	(South Korea) Yoon Sung-jun	
Machida Zelvia	(Australia) Mitch Duke	(Australia) Tete Yengi	(Germany) Aki Koch	(Israel) Neta Lavi	(Kosovo) Ibrahim Drešević	(Netherlands) Thomas Ouwejan	(Philippines) Nicholas Guimarães	(South Korea) Cha Je-hoon	(South Korea) Kim Min-tae			
Mito HollyHock	(Brazil) Hugo Leonardo	(Brazil) Patryck Ferreira	(Poland) Jakub Słowik									(Brazil) Matheus Leiria
Nagoya Grampus	(Brazil) Marcus Índio	(Brazil) Mateus Castro										
Sanfrecce Hiroshima	(Australia) Kusini Yengi	(Ivory Coast) Sébastien Haller	(South Korea) Kim Ju-sung									
Shimizu S-Pulse	(Brazil) Capixaba	(Brazil) Dieguinho	(Brazil) Mateus Brunetti	(South Korea) Eom Joo-young	(South Korea) Oh Se-hun	(South Korea) Park Seung-wook	(South Korea) Won Du-jae	(United States) Jelani Reshaun Sumiyoshi				
Tokyo Verdy	(Brazil) Matheus Vidotto	(South Korea) Cho Yu-min	(South Korea) Kim Hyun-woo									
Urawa Red Diamonds	(Australia) Luka Didulica	(Brazil) Danilo Boza	(Brazil) Matheus Sávio	(Sweden) Samuel Gustafson								
Vissel Kobe	(Brazil) Anderson Lopes	(Brazil) Caetano	(Brazil) Diego	(Brazil) Erik	(Brazil) Jean Patric	(Brazil) Matheus Thuler	(Nigeria) Richard Monday Ubong					
V-Varen Nagasaki	(Brazil) Diego Pituca	(Brazil) Eduardo	(Brazil) Emerson Deocleciano	(Brazil) Jonathan Júnior	(Brazil) Matheus Jesus	(Brazil) Thiago Santana	(Jamaica) Norman Campbell	(Serbia) Luka Radotić	(South Korea) Ko Rei-jin	(South Korea) Noh Hyeung-jun		
Yokohama F. Marinos	(Australia) Thomas Deng	(Belgium) Jordy Croux	(Brazil) Tevis Gabriel	(Brazil) Yuri	(Colombia) Jeison Quiñones	(Israel) Dean David	(South Korea) Park Il-gyu	(Spain) Rubén Blanco				

=== Foreign players by confederation ===
Foreign players by confederation
**CONMEBOL (55)**	Brazil (54), Colombia (1)
**AFC (27)**	South Korea (16), Australia (8), China (3), Malaysia (1), Philippines (1), Syria (1)
**UEFA (23)**	Spain (6), Germany (3), Serbia (3), Denmark (2), Israel (2), Belgium (1), Croatia (1), Kosovo (1), Netherlands (1), Poland (1), Portugal (1), Sweden (1), Turkey (1)
**CAF (4)**	Ivory Coast (2), Nigeria (1), Togo (1), Tunisia (1)
**CONCACAF (2)**	Jamaica (1), United States (1)
Total foreign players: 116

== League table ==
Pos	Team	Pld	W	D	L	GF	GA	GD	Pts	Qualification or relegation
1	FC Tokyo	14	10	3	1	33	8	+25	33	Qualification for the AFC Champions League Elite league stage
2	Kashiwa Reysol	14	10	1	3	31	20	+11	31	Qualification for the AFC Champions League Elite league stage
3	Sanfrecce Hiroshima	14	9	3	2	32	10	+22	30	Qualification for the AFC Champions League Elite league stage
4	Machida Zelvia	14	8	5	1	30	10	+20	29	Qualification for the AFC Champions League Elite playoff round
5	Vissel Kobe	14	8	3	3	23	14	+9	27	
6	Kashima Antlers	14	7	2	5	29	24	+5	23	
7	Yokohama F. Marinos	14	5	7	2	21	15	+6	22	
8	Kawasaki Frontale	14	6	4	4	28	24	+4	22	
9	Urawa Red Diamonds	14	7	1	6	23	29	−6	22	
10	Fagiano Okayama	14	5	2	7	16	22	−6	17	
11	Cerezo Osaka	14	4	5	5	16	25	−9	17	
12	Kyoto Sanga	14	4	4	6	19	23	−4	16	
13	Nagoya Grampus	14	4	2	8	15	23	−8	14	
14	Tokyo Verdy	14	3	5	6	12	22	−10	14	
15	Shimizu S-Pulse	14	4	2	8	10	23	−13	14	
16	V-Varen Nagasaki	14	3	4	7	17	22	−5	13	
17	JEF United Chiba	14	3	4	7	16	24	−8	13	
18	Gamba Osaka	14	2	6	6	16	24	−8	12	Relegation to the J2 League
19	Mito HollyHock	14	2	3	9	12	26	−14	9	Relegation to the J2 League
20	Avispa Fukuoka	14	2	2	10	14	25	−11	8	Relegation to the J2 League

Updated to match(es) played on 8 November 2026. Source: JLeague.jp,
Rules for classification: 1) Points; 2) Goal difference; 3) Goals scored; 4) Head-to-head points; 5) Head-to-head goal difference; 6) Head-to-head goals scored; 7) Fewer disciplinary points.

== Results ==
Home \ Away	AFU	COS	FOK	GOS	JEF	KSA	KSR	KWF	KYS	MCZ	MIH	NGR	SHI	SSP	TOK	TOV	URD	VVN	VKO	YFM
Avispa Fukuoka	—	3–0	2–1	1–2							1–1		0–1				2–3	1–1	0–1	
Cerezo Osaka		—	2–1	a	2–2		2–0	2–4						1–0		0–0				0–0
Fagiano Okayama			—						1–2		2–0		3–2		0–4	0–0		1–0	0–3	
Gamba Osaka		2–3		—					2–2				0–0		0–2		4–3		0–1	
JEF United Chiba	3–0		1–2	2–0	—					0–4	1–0							1–1		0–0
Kashima Antlers	3–2	4–1		2–0		—	2–3					2–1					0–1	2–0		
Kashiwa Reysol							—	2–1			2–1	1–3					4–0	4–2	4–2	0–2
Kawasaki Frontale			2–1		4–2	3–3		—	2–2			1–2		3–1					2–1	
Kyoto Sanga	2–1					2–2	2–3		—	0–1	1–3		2–0							
Machida Zelvia	3–0			0–0			2–4	2–1		—			0–0				3–1			1–1
Mito HollyHock				1–1		4–2		0–1		1–1	—		0–3	1–2			0–1			
Nagoya Grampus		1–1	2–1	3–1		0–2				1–3		—		0–1						1–1
Sanfrecce Hiroshima		6–1			3–0			1–1	3–0			3–0	—	4–0						
Shimizu S-Pulse	1–0			2–2	2–1		0–1			0–5				—	1–1	0–1				0–1
FC Tokyo					2–0	2–0	0–0		2–0	1–5	0–0	1–0			—	a	3–0			
Tokyo Verdy	3–1				1–1	0–2	1–3	1–1					0–2		0–4	—			0–2	
Urawa Red Diamonds			1–2		3–2								1–4			3–1	—	1–0		3–2
V-Varen Nagasaki		1–1		2–2					2–1			2–0	4–0		0–3	1–2		—		
Vissel Kobe		1–0				2–1				0–0		3–1			2–2		2–2	3–1	—	
Yokohama F. Marinos			1–1			3–4		4–2	1–1		2–0					2–2			1–0	—

Updated to match(es) played on 8 November 2026. Source: J.League
Legend: Blue = home team win; Yellow = draw; Red = away team win.

== Season statistics ==
=== Top scorers ===
As of 8 November 2026

Rank	Player	Club	Goals
1	(Brazil) Léo Ceará	Kashima Antlers	12
2	(Japan) Akito Suzuki	Sanfrecce Hiroshima	10
3	(Japan) Yusuke Segawa	Kashiwa Reysol	8
3	(Brazil) Marcinho	Kawasaki Frontale	8
3	(Japan) Motoki Nagakura	FC Tokyo	8
6	(Slovakia) Aleksandar Čavrić	Kashima Antlers	7
6	(Japan) Kaina Tanimura	Yokohama F. Marinos	7
6	(Brazil) Rafael Elias	Kyoto Sanga	7
9	(Japan) Yuya Osako	Vissel Kobe	6

=== Hat-tricks ===
Player	For	Against	Result	Date	Ref.
(Japan) Arata Watanabe^{4}	Mito HollyHock	Kashima Antlers	4–2 (H)	2 September 2026	
(Japan) Kota Kawano	Fagiano Okayama	Sanfrecce Hiroshima	3–2 (H)	6 September 2026	
(Japan) Shun Ayukawa	Sanfrecce Hiroshima	Cerezo Osaka	6–1 (H)	12 September 2026	
(Japan) Takuma Nishimura	Machida Zelvia	Shimizu S-Pulse	5–0 (A)	21 October 2026	

== Awards ==
=== Monthly MVP ===
Month	Player	Pos.	Club	Ref.
August	(Brazil) Léo Ceará	FW	Kashima Antlers	
September	(Japan) Yusuke Segawa	MF	Kashiwa Reysol	
October	(Japan) Motoki Nagakura	FW	FC Tokyo	

=== Goal of the Month ===
Month	Player	Pos.	Club	Ref.
August	(Japan) Akito Suzuki	FW	Sanfrecce Hiroshima	
September	(Japan) Tatsuya Ito	FW	Kawasaki Frontale	
October	(Japan) Akito Suzuki (2)	FW	Sanfrecce Hiroshima	

=== Young Player of the Month ===
Month	Player	Pos.	Club	Ref.
August	(Japan) Shin Miidera	MF	Yokohama F. Marinos	
September	(Japan) Yūdai Shimamoto	MF	Shimizu S-Pulse	
October	(Japan) Kenshin Yasuda	MF	V-Varen Nagasaki	

=== Save of the Month ===
Month	Player	Club	Ref.
August	(Japan) Kosuke Nakamura	Cerezo Osaka	
September	(Japan) Kosuke Nakamura (2)	Cerezo Osaka	
October	(Japan) Keisuke Osako	Sanfrecce Hiroshima	

=== Manager of the Month ===
Month	Manager	Club	Ref.
August	(Spain) Ricardo Rodríguez	Kashiwa Reysol	
September	(Germany) Michael Skibbe	Vissel Kobe	
October	(Japan) Rikizo Matsuhashi	FC Tokyo	

== See also ==
- 2026–27 Emperor's Cup
- 2026–27 J.League Cup
- 2026–27 J2 League
- 2026–27 J3 League
- 2026–27 Japan Football League
- 2026 Japanese Regional Leagues
