= 2025 J1 League =

33rd season of the J1 League

J1 League
- Season: 2025
- Dates: 14 February – 6 December
- Champions: Kashima Antlers; 9th J1 title 9th Japanese title
- Relegated: Yokohama FC; Shonan Bellmare; Albirex Niigata
- Champions League Elite: Kashima Antlers; Kashiwa Reysol; Kyoto Sanga
- Matches: 380
- Goals: 911 (2.4 per match)
- Top goalscorer: Léo Ceará (21 goals)
- Biggest home win: Kyoto Sanga 5–0 Fagiano Okayama (30 August 2025)
- Biggest away win: Gamba Osaka 0–5 Kashiwa Reysol (18 October 2025)
- Highest scoring: Shonan Bellmare 4–5 Gamba Osaka (31 August 2025)
- Longest winning run: 8 matches Machida Zelvia
- Longest unbeaten run: 15 matches Kashima Antlers
- Longest winless run: 19 matches Albirex Niigata; Shonan Bellmare
- Longest losing run: 7 matches Shonan Bellmare; Yokohama FC; Yokohama F. Marinos
- Highest attendance: 59,574; Kashima Antlers 2–1 Kawasaki Frontale (11 May 2025)
- Lowest attendance: 6,157; Avispa Fukuoka 1–1 Fagiano Okayama (25 April 2025)
- Total attendance: 8,073,557
- Average attendance: 21,246

The 2025 J1 League, also known as the 2025 Meiji Yasuda J1 League (Japanese: 2025 明治安田J1リーグ, Hepburn: 2025 Meiji Yasuda J1 Rīgu) for sponsorship reasons, was the 33rd season of J1 League, the top Japanese professional league for association football clubs, since its establishment in 1992. This was the 11th season of the league since its rebrand from J.League Division 1.

Vissel Kobe were the defending champions, having won their second league title in a row on the last matchday of the 2024 season.

Kashima Antlers won a record-extending ninth J.League title on the last matchday; it was their record-breaking ninth top flight title, their first trophy since winning the 2018 AFC Champions League, and the first league title since 2016.

== Overview ==
This was the last J.League season played in a whole calendar year from late winter to early winter, with the following season onwards to be played from September to May, adopting the European football calendar. As a part of the transition, the league would have a one-off special tournament called the J1 100 Year Vision League to be held during the first half of 2026.

The tournament format and match format was announced on 25 November 2024, with the season starting on 14 February 2025 and concluding on 6 December 2025.

== Changes from the previous season ==
Three teams were relegated to the 2025 J2 League. Júbilo Iwata, Hokkaido Consadole Sapporo, and Sagan Tosu, were relegated as they finished 18th, 19th, and 20th respectively in the previous season, ending their one, eight, and 13-year stays in the top flight respectively.

Three teams were promoted from the 2024 J2 League: Shimizu S-Pulse, who won the title and returned to J1 after a two-year absence, Yokohama FC, who finished second, returning to the J1 after just a season playing in the J2 League, and Fagiano Okayama, who finished fifth and won the play-offs; they are playing in the top flight for the first time in their history.

== Clubs ==
Locations of the 2025 J1 League teams
2025 J1 League teams in Keihanshin
2025 J1 League teams in Greater Tokyo Area

Club	Location	Stadium	Capacity
Kashima Antlers	Ibaraki Prefecture	Kashima Soccer Stadium	39,095
Urawa Red Diamonds	Saitama Prefecture	Saitama Stadium 2002	62,040
Kashiwa Reysol	Chiba Prefecture	Sankyo Frontier Kashiwa Stadium	15,109
FC Tokyo	Tokyo	Ajinomoto Stadium	47,851
Tokyo Verdy	Tokyo	Ajinomoto Stadium	47,851
Machida Zelvia	Tokyo	Machida GION Stadium	15,489
Kawasaki Frontale	Kanagawa Prefecture	Uvance Todoroki Stadium by Fujitsu	26,827
Yokohama F. Marinos	Kanagawa Prefecture	Nissan Stadium	71,624
Yokohama FC	Kanagawa Prefecture	NHK Spring Mitsuzawa Football Stadium	15,442
Shonan Bellmare	Kanagawa Prefecture	Lemon Gas Stadium Hiratsuka	15,380
Albirex Niigata	Niigata Prefecture	Denka Big Swan Stadium	41,684
Shimizu S-Pulse	Shizuoka Prefecture	IAI Stadium Nihondaira	19,594
Nagoya Grampus	Aichi Prefecture	Toyota Stadium	42,753
Kyoto Sanga	Kyoto Prefecture	Sanga Stadium by Kyocera	21,623
Gamba Osaka	Osaka Prefecture	Panasonic Stadium Suita	39,694
Cerezo Osaka	Osaka Prefecture	Yodoko Sakura Stadium	24,481
Vissel Kobe	Hyōgo Prefecture	Noevir Stadium Kobe	29,643
Fagiano Okayama	Okayama Prefecture	JFE Harenokuni Stadium	15,479
Sanfrecce Hiroshima	Hiroshima Prefecture	Edion Peace Wing Hiroshima	28,347
Avispa Fukuoka	Fukuoka Prefecture	Best Denki Stadium	21,562

=== Personnel and kits ===
Club	Manager	Captain	Kit manufacturer	Kit sponsors	
Club	Manager	Captain	Kit manufacturer	Main	Other(s)
Albirex Niigata	(Japan) Toru Irie (interim)	(Japan) Yuto Horigome	(Germany) Adidas	Kameda Seika	List: Front: NSG Group, Denka; Back: Komeri, Niigata Nippo; Sleeves: NAMICS Corporation; Shorts: None
Avispa Fukuoka	(South Korea) Kim Myung-hwi	(Japan) Tatsuki Nara	(Japan) Yonex	Shin Nihon Seiyaku	List: Front: Agekke Corporation, Hakata Green Hotel; Back: Apaman Property, Septeni; Sleeves: Oral Care Clinic, Fukuoka; Shorts: Pietro Dressings
Cerezo Osaka	(Australia) Arthur Papas	(Japan) Shunta Tanaka	(Japan) Mizuno	Yanmar	List: Front: Yodoko, Nikkon Holdings; Back: Nippon Ham, Singha Beer; Sleeves: Capcom, Osaka, Sakai; Shorts: Nakabayashi Co.
Fagiano Okayama	(Japan) Takashi Kiyama	(Japan) Ryo Takeuchi	(Brazil) Penalty	GROP	List: Front: Healthy Home Inc., Serio Inc.; Back: un-deux Co., Okanetsu; Sleeves: Okayama Shinkin Bank; Shorts: Sanyo Shimbun, Bisho Co., Ltd.
FC Tokyo	(Japan) Rikizo Matsuhashi	(Japan) Kei Koizumi	(United States) New Balance	Tokyo Gas	List: Front: Mitsui & Co., Mixi; Back: Mitsubishi Corporation; Sleeves: Keio Corporation; Shorts: Mixi
Gamba Osaka	(Spain) Dani Poyatos	(Japan) Takashi Usami	(Denmark) Hummel	Panasonic	List: Front: Daicel, Panasonic; Back: Rohto Pharmaceutical, Ship Healthcare; Sleeves: Toyo Tires, Osaka; Shorts: Suita
Kashima Antlers	(Japan) Toru Oniki	(Japan) Gaku Shibasaki	(United States) Nike	LIXIL	List: Front: Mercari; Back: YellowHat, Riso Kagaku Corporation; Sleeves: Nippon Steel; Shorts: Kaneka Corporation, Takasago Thermal Engineering
Kashiwa Reysol	(Spain) Ricardo Rodríguez	(Japan) Tomoya Inukai	(Japan) Yonex	Hitachi	List: Front: Sankyo Frontier, Hitachi Systems; Back: Aflac, Hitachi Building Systems; Sleeves: Hitachi Plant Services; Shorts: Lawson Ticket, Hitachi High-Tech Corporation
Kawasaki Frontale	(Japan) Shigetoshi Hasebe	(Japan) Yasuto Wakizaka	(Germany) Puma	Fujitsu	List: Front: Anker, Renosy, Sustainable Development Goals; Back: SMBC Nikko Securities, PwC; Sleeves: Ebara Foods, Kawasaki; Shorts: Matsuo Komuten
Kyoto Sanga	(South Korea) Cho Kwi-jae	(Japan) Sota Kawasaki	(Germany) Puma	Kyocera	List: Front: Wacoal, Horiba; Back: Nintendo, au; Sleeves: Bank of Kyoto, Kyoto; Shorts: Daiwa Securities Group
Machida Zelvia	(Japan) Go Kuroda	(Japan) Gen Shoji	(Germany) Adidas	CyberAgent	List: Front: Rudel Inc., Avex; Back: Odakyu Electric Railway; Sleeves: Tamagawa University, Machida; Shorts: Daiwa Securities Group
Nagoya Grampus	(Japan) Kenta Hasegawa	(Japan) Ryuji Izumi	(Japan) Mizuno	Toyota GR Yaris	List: Front: Workstaff Co., Proto Corporation; Back: Denso, Toyota Tsusho; Sleeves: Yahagi Engineering, Nagoya, Miyoshi; Shorts: ITOCO
Sanfrecce Hiroshima	(Germany) Michael Skibbe	(Japan) Sho Sasaki	(United States) Nike	EDION	List: Front: Hisense, EDION Hikari; Back: Mazda, Hirogin Holdings; Sleeves: youme Town Hiroshima, One Ball, One World; Shorts: Teral Group, Mobile e Hoken
Shimizu S-Pulse	(Japan) Tadahiro Akiba	(Japan) Koya Kitagawa	(Germany) Puma	Suzuyo (Home & Away) / Star Micronics (Third)	List: Front: ITEC, Taica; Back: IAI, Harada Group; Sleeves: Japan Airlines, Shizuoka; Shorts: Taica, Suruga Giken Co.
Shonan Bellmare	(Japan) Satoshi Yamaguchi	(Japan) Akito Suzuki	(Brazil) Penalty	Fujita	List: Front: RIZAP, Amada; Back: Sanno University; Sleeves: Mackenzie House, Shōnan; Shorts: Nippon Tanshi
Tokyo Verdy	(Japan) Hiroshi Jofuku	(Japan) Koki Morita	(Brazil) Athleta	Nicigas	List: Front: The Super Sports XEBIO; Back: Miroku Jyoho Service, Classmethod; Sleeves: Good Com Asset, Tokyo; Shorts: BRI Group
Urawa Red Diamonds	(Poland) Maciej Skorża	(Japan) Takahiro Sekine	(United States) Nike	Polus	List: Front: Enecle; Back: Mitsubishi Heavy Industries; Sleeves: Mitsubishi Motors; Shorts: DHL, Mitsubishi Delica D5
Vissel Kobe	(Japan) Takayuki Yoshida	(Japan) Tetsushi Yamakawa	(Japan) Asics	Rakuten Mobile	List: Front: Danton, Seiban; Back: Kawasaki, Henri Charpentier; Sleeves: Noevir, Kobe; Shorts:
Yokohama FC	(Japan) Fumitake Miura	(Japan) Yoshiaki Komai	(Germany) Puma	Onodera Group	List: Front: Yokorei, Fudeal Creation; Back: Frontier Direct, Japan Elevator Service; Sleeves: S-Dental Group, Yokohama; Shorts: Macnica, LIST Co.
Yokohama F. Marinos	(Japan) Hideo Ōshima	(Japan) Takuya Kida	(Germany) Adidas	Nissan	List: Front: DRAFT; Back: Nisshin OilliO; Sleeves: Yokohama, Yokosuka, Yamato; Shorts: Morinaga In Jelly

=== Managerial changes ===
Team	Outgoing manager	Manner of departure	Date of vacancy	Position in the table	Incoming manager	Date of appointment
Kashiwa Reysol	(Japan) Masami Ihara	End of contract	9 December 2024	Pre-season	(Spain) Ricardo Rodríguez	11 December 2024
FC Tokyo	(Australia) Peter Cklamovski	End of contract	9 December 2024	Pre-season	(Japan) Rikizo Matsuhashi	21 December 2024
Cerezo Osaka	(Japan) Akio Kogiku	End of contract	9 December 2024	Pre-season	(Australia) Arthur Papas	17 December 2024
Avispa Fukuoka	(Japan) Shigetoshi Hasebe	End of contract	9 December 2024	Pre-season	(South Korea) Kim Myung-hwi	13 December 2024
Kawasaki Frontale	(Japan) Toru Oniki	End of contract	9 December 2024	Pre-season	(Japan) Shigetoshi Hasebe	12 December 2024
Kashima Antlers	(Japan) Masaki Chugo	End of interim spell	9 December 2024	Pre-season	(Japan) Toru Oniki	12 December 2024
Yokohama F. Marinos	(Malta) John Hutchinson	End of interim spell	9 December 2024	Pre-season	(England) Steve Holland	17 December 2024
Albirex Niigata	(Japan) Rikizo Matsuhashi	Resigned	13 December 2024	Pre-season	(Japan) Daisuke Kimori	19 December 2024
Yokohama F. Marinos	(England) Steve Holland	Sacked	18 April 2025	19th	(Australia) Patrick Kisnorbo (Note: Kisnorbo was initially appointed as interim manager, but he was made permanent on 5 May 2025.)	18 April 2025
Yokohama F. Marinos	(Australia) Patrick Kisnorbo	Resigned	19 June 2025	20th	(Japan) Hideo Ōshima (Note: Ōshima was initially appointed as interim manager, but he was made permanent on 24 June 2025.)	19 June 2025
Albirex Niigata	(Japan) Daisuke Kimori	Sacked	23 June 2025	18th	(Japan) Toru Irie (interim)	23 June 2025
Yokohama FC	(Japan) Shuhei Yomoda	Sacked	23 July 2025	19th	(Japan) Fumitake Miura	23 July 2025

=== Foreign players ===
From the 2019 season, there were no limitations on signing foreign players, but clubs could only register up to five of them for a single matchday squad. Players from J.League partner nations (Thailand, Vietnam, Morocco, Malaysia, Cambodia, Singapore, Indonesia) were exempted from these restrictions.

- Players name in **bold** indicates the player was registered during the mid-season transfer window.
- Player's name in italics indicates the player had Japanese nationality in addition to their FIFA nationality, held the nationality of a J.League partner nation, or was exempted from being treated as a foreign player due to having been born in Japan and being enrolled in, or having graduated from an approved type of school in the country.

Club	Player 1	Player 2	Player 3	Player 4	Player 5	Player 6	Player 7	Player 8	Former player (s)
Albirex Niigata	(Australia) Jason Geria	(Brazil) Danilo Gomes	(Brazil) Matheus Moraes	(Brazil) Miguel Silveira	(New Zealand) Michael Fitzgerald	(Sweden) **Abdelrahman Boudah**			
Avispa Fukuoka	(Brazil) Wellington	(Iran) Shahab Zahedi	(South Korea) Kim Moon-hyeon	(Switzerland) Nassim Ben Khalifa					
Cerezo Osaka	(Brazil) Lucas Fernandes	(Brazil) Rafael Ratão	(Brazil) Thiago Andrade	(Brazil) Vitor Bueno	(Malaysia) **Dion Cools**	(South Korea) Kim Jin-hyeon	(South Korea) Wigi Kanemoto		(Thailand) Jaroensak Wonggorn
Fagiano Okayama	(Bolivia) **Yuto Baigorria**	(Brazil) Lucão	(Brazil) **Werik Popó**	(Germany) Svend Brodersen					(Brazil) Gleyson
FC Tokyo	(Brazil) Everton Galdino	(Brazil) Henrique Trevisan	(Brazil) Marcelo Ryan	(Brazil) **Marcos Guilherme**	(Denmark) **Alexander Scholz**	(South Korea) **Kim Seung-gyu**			(South Korea) Baek In-hwan
Gamba Osaka	(Brazil) Juan Alano	(Brazil) Welton	(China) Zhang Aolin	(Tunisia) Issam Jebali	(Turkey) Deniz Hümmet				(Israel) Neta Lavi
Kashima Antlers	(Brazil) **Élber**	(Brazil) Léo Ceará	(Brazil) Talles	(Serbia) Aleksandar Čavrić	(South Korea) Kim Tae-hyeon	(South Korea) Park Eui-jeong			
Kashiwa Reysol	(Brazil) Diego								
Kawasaki Frontale	(Brazil) Erison	(Brazil) Jesiel	(Brazil) Marcinho	(China) **Noriharu Kan**	(Croatia) **Filip Uremović**	(Serbia) **Lazar Romanić**	(South Korea) Jung Sung-ryong	(South Korea) Lee Geun-hyeong	(Brazil) Patrick Verhon (Colombia) César Haydar
Kyoto Sanga	(Brazil) **Barreto**	(Brazil) João Pedro	(Brazil) **Léo Gomes**	(Brazil) Marco Túlio	(Brazil) Patrick William	(Brazil) Rafael Elias	(South Korea) Yoon Sung-jun	(Spain) **Marc Vito**	(Brazil) Murilo Costa (South Korea) Gu Sung-yun
Machida Zelvia	(Australia) Mitch Duke	(Israel) **Neta Lavi**	(Kosovo) Ibrahim Drešević	(Myanmar) Kaung Zan Mara	(South Korea) Cha Je-hoon	(South Korea) Na Sang-ho	(South Korea) Oh Se-hun		(Brazil) Erik (Chile) Byron Vásquez (United States) Anton Burns
Nagoya Grampus	(Brazil) Mateus	(Denmark) Kasper Junker							(Brazil) **Lelê** (Togo) Yves Avelete
Sanfrecce Hiroshima	(Brazil) Marcos Júnior	(France) Valère Germain	(Germany) Tolgay Arslan	(South Korea) Jeong Min-ki	(South Korea) **Kim Ju-sung**				
Shimizu S-Pulse	(Brazil) Capixaba	(Brazil) **Mateus Brunetti**	(Brazil) Matheus Bueno	(Bulgaria) Ahmed Ahmedov	(Panama) **Alfredo Stephens**	(South Korea) **Kim Min-tae**	(United States) Jelani Reshaun Sumiyoshi		(Brazil) Douglas Tanque
Shonan Bellmare	(Brazil) Luiz Phellype	(Brazil) Zé Ricardo							(Brazil) Lukian (South Korea) Kim Min-tae
Tokyo Verdy	(Brazil) Matheus Vidotto								
Urawa Red Diamonds	(Australia) **Luka Didulica**	(Brazil) Danilo Boza	(Brazil) Matheus Sávio	(Brazil) Thiago Santana	(Norway) Marius Høibråten	(Sweden) **Isaac Kiese Thelin**	(Sweden) Samuel Gustafson		
Vissel Kobe	(Brazil) Caetano	(Brazil) Erik	(Brazil) Gustavo Klismahn	(Brazil) Jean Patric	(Brazil) Matheus Thuler	(Nigeria) Richard Monday Ubong			
Yokohama FC	(Brazil) **Adaílton**	(Brazil) João Paulo	(Brazil) Léo Bahia	(Brazil) Lukian	(Brazil) Phelipe	(Brazil) Yuri Lara	(Poland) **Jakub Słowik**		(Brazil) Michel (Canada) Shawn van Eerden
Yokohama F. Marinos	(Australia) Thomas Deng	(Belgium) **Jordy Croux**	(Brazil) **Yuri Araujo**	(Colombia) Jeison Quiñones	(Israel) **Dean David**	(South Korea) Park Il-gyu	(Togo) Kodjo Aziangbe		(Brazil) Anderson Lopes (Brazil) Élber (Brazil) Yan Matheus (Indonesia) Sandy Walsh

== League table ==
Pos	Team	Pld	W	D	L	GF	GA	GD	Pts	Qualification or relegation
1	Kashima Antlers (C)	38	23	7	8	58	31	+27	76	Qualification for the AFC Champions League Elite league stage
2	Kashiwa Reysol	38	21	12	5	60	34	+26	75	Qualification for the AFC Champions League Elite league stage
3	Kyoto Sanga	38	19	11	8	62	40	+22	68	Qualification for the AFC Champions League Elite league stage
4	Sanfrecce Hiroshima	38	20	8	10	46	28	+18	68	
5	Vissel Kobe	38	18	10	10	46	33	+13	64	Qualification for the AFC Champions League Elite league stage (Note: Qualified as the finalists of the J1 100 Year Vision League.)
6	Machida Zelvia	38	17	9	12	52	38	+14	60	Qualification for the AFC Champions League Two group stage (Note: Qualified as the 2025 Emperor's Cup winners.)
7	Urawa Red Diamonds	38	16	11	11	45	39	+6	59	
8	Kawasaki Frontale	38	15	12	11	66	56	+10	57	
9	Gamba Osaka	38	17	6	15	53	55	−2	57	Qualification for the AFC Champions League Elite playoff round (Note: Qualified as 2025–26 AFC Champions League Two winners.)
10	Cerezo Osaka	38	14	10	14	60	57	+3	52	
11	FC Tokyo	38	13	11	14	41	48	−7	50	
12	Avispa Fukuoka	38	12	12	14	34	38	−4	48	
13	Fagiano Okayama	38	12	9	17	33	42	−9	45	
14	Shimizu S-Pulse	38	11	11	16	41	51	−10	44	
15	Yokohama F. Marinos	38	12	7	19	46	47	−1	43	
16	Nagoya Grampus	38	11	10	17	44	56	−12	43	
17	Tokyo Verdy	38	11	10	17	23	41	−18	43	
18	Yokohama FC (R)	38	9	8	21	27	45	−18	35	Relegation to the J2 League
19	Shonan Bellmare (R)	38	8	8	22	36	63	−27	32	Relegation to the J2 League
20	Albirex Niigata (R)	38	4	12	22	36	67	−31	24	Relegation to the J2 League

Source: JLeague.co, JLeague.jp, J.League Data Site
Rules for classification: 1) Points; 2) Goal difference; 3) Goals scored; 4) Head-to-head points; 5) Head-to-head goal difference; 6) Head-to-head goals scored; 7) Fewer disciplinary points.
(C) Champions; (R) Relegated

== Results ==
Home \ Away	ANI	AFU	COS	FOK	GOS	KSA	KSR	KWF	KYS	MCZ	NGR	SHI	SHB	SSP	TOK	TOV	URD	VKO	YOK	YFM
Albirex Niigata	—	0–1	2–2	1–1	3–3	1–2	1–3	1–1	1–2	0–4	0–0	0–2	2–1	0–1	2–3	2–2	1–1	2–2	0–0	1–0
Avispa Fukuoka	3–2	—	2–4	1–1	1–0	0–1	0–1	1–2	2–2	2–2	1–1	1–2	1–0	0–0	1–0	0–0	1–0	0–0	1–0	2–1
Cerezo Osaka	3–1	2–0	—	2–1	0–1	1–0	1–1	2–0	1–2	1–2	1–1	1–1	1–2	4–2	1–1	2–1	1–1	1–1	1–3	1–0
Fagiano Okayama	2–1	0–1	1–2	—	2–0	1–2	2–1	0–0	2–0	2–2	0–1	0–1	1–0	1–1	1–0	0–1	0–1	1–2	0–0	1–0
Gamba Osaka	4–2	2–1	2–5	0–3	—	0–1	0–5	2–1	2–1	0–1	2–0	0–1	4–0	1–0	2–0	4–1	1–0	1–1	3–2	3–1
Kashima Antlers	2–1	1–1	3–1	1–2	0–0	—	3–2	2–1	3–4	1–0	1–0	1–1	3–0	1–0	2–0	4–0	1–1	1–0	2–1	2–1
Kashiwa Reysol	1–1	2–1	2–1	2–0	1–0	1–3	—	1–1	3–3	1–0	1–0	0–0	2–0	1–0	1–0	0–0	4–2	1–3	2–0	1–0
Kawasaki Frontale	3–1	2–5	2–0	1–1	2–2	2–1	4–4	—	0–1	5–3	4–0	1–2	2–0	5–3	0–1	0–0	2–2	1–2	2–1	3–3
Kyoto Sanga	2–1	0–1	2–3	5–0	3–1	1–1	1–1	1–1	—	1–1	1–1	1–0	2–0	0–1	3–0	1–0	1–1	2–0	2–1	0–3
Machida Zelvia	1–0	0–0	3–0	1–0	3–1	2–1	3–0	2–2	1–2	—	3–1	1–2	0–1	3–0	0–1	0–1	0–2	2–0	1–1	0–3
Nagoya Grampus	3–0	1–0	2–1	0–0	0–2	0–4	1–2	3–4	1–2	1–2	—	2–1	3–1	1–1	1–1	0–0	2–1	2–2	2–1	2–0
Sanfrecce Hiroshima	0–1	2–1	2–1	0–1	1–0	1–0	1–1	1–2	1–1	2–1	1–2	—	2–1	0–0	0–0	2–1	3–0	0–1	1–0	1–0
Shonan Bellmare	5–2	0–0	3–3	1–1	4–5	1–0	0–1	1–2	1–1	1–2	2–1	0–1	—	1–0	2–2	0–1	2–1	1–2	0–1	1–1
Shimizu S-Pulse	2–0	3–1	1–4	1–2	0–0	1–1	0–2	1–1	1–2	2–2	0–3	1–1	3–0	—	1–1	1–0	0–0	3–2	2–0	1–3
FC Tokyo	1–1	1–0	2–2	3–1	3–0	0–1	1–1	0–3	0–4	0–1	3–1	0–3	0–0	0–2	—	1–0	3–2	1–0	2–1	2–3
Tokyo Verdy	1–0	0–0	1–0	4–2	0–1	0–1	0–3	1–0	1–0	0–1	2–1	0–3	0–2	0–1	2–2	—	0–0	0–1	2–0	1–0
Urawa Red Diamonds	1–0	0–0	0–0	1–0	0–1	0–1	0–2	4–0	2–1	0–0	2–1	1–0	4–1	2–1	3–2	2–0	—	1–0	2–1	3–1
Vissel Kobe	0–1	0–1	1–3	2–0	3–2	0–0	0–0	2–1	1–1	1–0	2–1	1–0	4–0	2–1	0–0	4–0	0–0	—	0–1	1–0
Yokohama FC	1–0	1–0	2–0	1–0	1–1	0–3	1–1	0–1	0–1	0–2	2–2	0–4	1–0	2–0	0–1	0–0	1–2	0–1	—	0–1
Yokohama F. Marinos	1–1	2–0	3–1	0–1	2–0	3–1	0–2	0–3	0–3	0–0	3–0	3–0	1–1	2–3	0–3	0–0	4–0	1–2	0–0	—

Source: J1 League
Legend: Blue = home team win; Yellow = draw; Red = away team win.

== Season statistics ==
=== Top scorers ===
Rank	Player	Club	Goals
1	(Brazil) Léo Ceará	Kashima Antlers	21
2	(Brazil) Rafael Elias	Kyoto Sanga	18
2	(Brazil) Rafael Ratão	Cerezo Osaka	18
4	(Japan) Tatsuya Ito	Kawasaki Frontale	13
5	(Brazil) Erison	Kawasaki Frontale	12
6	(Japan) Mao Hosoya	Kashiwa Reysol	11
6	(Japan) Sho Inagaki	Nagoya Grampus	11
6	(Japan) Taisei Miyashiro	Vissel Kobe	11
9	(Japan) Koya Kitagawa	Shimizu S-Pulse	10
9	(Japan) Yuma Suzuki	Kashima Antlers	10

=== Hat-tricks ===
Player	For	Against	Result	Date	Ref.
(Brazil) Léo Ceará	Kashima Antlers	Kashiwa Reysol	3–1 (A)	8 March 2025	
(Brazil) Rafael Elias	Kyoto Sanga	Kashima Antlers	4–3 (A)	6 April 2025	
(Brazil) Rafael Elias	Kyoto Sanga	FC Tokyo	4–0 (A)	24 August 2025	
(Japan) Mao Hosoya	Kashiwa Reysol	Albirex Niigata	3–1 (A)	30 November 2025	

== Awards ==
=== Monthly awards ===
Month	Manager of the Month		Monthly MVP		Goal of the Month		Young Player of the Month		Save of the Month		References
Month	Manager	Club	Player	Club	Player	Club	Player	Club	Player	Club	References
February/March	(Japan) Toru Oniki	Kashima Antlers	(Brazil) Léo Ceará	Kashima Antlers	(Japan) Shunki Higashi	Sanfrecce Hiroshima	(Japan) Sōta Kitano	Cerezo Osaka	(Japan) Ryosuke Kojima	Kashiwa Reysol	
April	(Poland) Maciej Skorża	Urawa Red Diamonds	(Brazil) Rafael Elias	Kyoto Sanga	(Japan) Ryo Tabei	Fagiano Okayama	(Japan) Ryūnosuke Satō	Fagiano Okayama	(Japan) Tomoki Hayakawa	Kashima Antlers	
May	(Australia) Arthur Papas	Cerezo Osaka	(Brazil) Lucas Fernandes	Cerezo Osaka	(Japan) Taisei Miyashiro	Vissel Kobe	(Japan) Alexandre Pisano	Nagoya Grampus	(Japan) Kōki Fukui	Cerezo Osaka	
June	(Spain) Ricardo Rodríguez	Kashiwa Reysol	(Japan) Tojiro Kubo	Kashiwa Reysol	(Japan) Motoki Nagakura	FC Tokyo	(Japan) Kota Takai	Kawasaki Frontale	(Germany) Svend Brodersen	Fagiano Okayama	
July	(Japan) Takayuki Yoshida	Vissel Kobe	(Japan) Taisei Miyashiro	Vissel Kobe	(Brazil) Léo Ceará	Kashima Antlers	(Japan) Ryūnosuke Satō	Fagiano Okayama	(Japan) William Popp	Shonan Bellmare	
August	(South Korea) Cho Kwi-jae	Kyoto Sanga	(Brazil) Rafael Elias	Kyoto Sanga	(Japan) Yūta Nakayama	Machida Zelvia	(Japan) Sena Ishibashi	Shonan Bellmare	(Japan) Keisuke Ōsako	Sanfrecce Hiroshima	
September	(Japan) Toru Oniki	Kashima Antlers	(Japan) Tatsuya Ito	Kawasaki Frontale	(Japan) Taiki Arai	Albirex Niigata	(Japan) Homare Tokuda	Kashima Antlers	(Japan) Tomoki Hayakawa	Kashima Antlers	
October	(Spain) Ricardo Rodríguez	Kashiwa Reysol	(Japan) Tomoki Hayakawa	Kashima Antlers	(Japan) Yuma Suzuki	Kashima Antlers	(Japan) Ryūnosuke Satō	Fagiano Okayama	(Japan) Tomoki Hayakawa	Kashima Antlers	
November/December	(Japan) Toru Oniki	Kashima Antlers	(Brazil) Léo Ceará	Kashima Antlers	(Japan) Mao Hosoya	Kashiwa Reysol	(Japan) Harumi Minamino	Gamba Osaka	(Japan) Tomoki Hayakawa	Kashima Antlers	

=== Annual awards ===
Award	Winner	Club
Manager of the Year	(Spain) Ricardo Rodríguez	Kashiwa Reysol
Player of the Year	(Japan) Tomoki Hayakawa	Kashima Antlers
Best Young Player	(Japan) Ryūnosuke Satō	Fagiano Okayama
Goal of the Year	(Brazil) Léo Ceará	Kashima Antlers

Best XI
Goalkeeper	(Japan) Tomoki Hayakawa (Kashima Antlers)			
Defenders	(Japan) Naomichi Ueda (Kashima Antlers)		(Japan) Taiyo Koga (Kashiwa Reysol)	(Japan) Hayato Araki (Sanfrecce Hiroshima)
Midfielders	(Japan) Yoshio Koizumi (Kashiwa Reysol)	(Japan) Sho Inagaki (Nagoya Grampus)	(Japan) Satoshi Tanaka (Sanfrecce Hiroshima)	
Forwards	(Brazil) Léo Ceará (Kashima Antlers)	(Japan) Yūki Sōma (Machida Zelvia)	(Japan) Tatsuya Itō (Kawasaki Frontale)	(Brazil) Rafael Elias (Kyoto Sanga)

== See also ==
- 2025 Japanese Super Cup
- 2025 Emperor's Cup
- 2025 J.League Cup
- 2025 J2 League
- 2025 J3 League
- 2025 Japan Football League
- 2025 Japanese Regional Leagues
