= Motoki Nagakura =

Japanese footballer (born 1999)

Motoki Nagakura 長倉 幹樹
Personal information
- Date of birth: 7 October 1999 (age 27)
- Place of birth: Urawa, Saitama, Japan
- Height: 1.77 m (5 ft 10 in)
- Position: Forward

Team information
- Current team: FC Tokyo
- Number: 26

Youth career
- NEOS FC
- 2012–2017: Urawa Red Diamonds

College career
Years	Team	Apps	(Gls)
2018–2021	Juntendo University	57	(11)

Senior career*
Years	Team	Apps	(Gls)
2022	Tokyo United FC	9	(8)
2022–2023	Thespakusatsu Gunma	26	(7)
2023–2024	Albirex Niigata	40	(6)
2025	Urawa Red Diamonds	13	(1)
2025	→ FC Tokyo (loan)	11	(4)
2026–	FC Tokyo	24	(10)
- * Club domestic league appearances and goals as of 10:51, 16 November 2026 (UTC)

Motoki Nagakura (長倉 幹樹, Nagakura Motoki; born 7 October 1999) is a Japanese professional footballer who plays as a forward for J1 League club FC Tokyo.

== Youth career ==
Nagakura began his career with Urawa Reds Junior Youth (under-15) after being scouted from junior high school. Despite being physically smaller than his peers, he was technically skilled and eventually earned promotion to Urawa Reds Youth (under-18). In 2017, he scored 7 goals in 18 appearances in the Prince Takamado JFA U-18 Premier League. Nagakura spent three years with Urawa Reds Youth, but was not offered promotion to the first team, so he decided to go to Juntendo University.

Nagakura spent four seasons at Juntendo University, culminating in a run in the 2021 Emperor's Cup, where he helped knock out J1 League club FC Tokyo in the second round and narrowly lose out to J2 League club Thespakusatsu Gunma in the third round.

== Club career ==
=== Tokyo United FC ===
After finishing university and not receiving any offers from J.League clubs, Nagakura decided to join fifth-tier Kantō Soccer League club Tokyo United FC. As this was an amateur contract, he worked part-time in a gym alongside playing football. Nagakura impressed on the pitch, scoring 8 goals in 9 appearances. He finished as the league's joint top scorer, despite only playing for half the season.

=== Thespakusatsu Gunma ===
In August 2022, Nagakura was offered a professional contract and transferred to J2 League club Thespakusatsu Gunma. He would be joining up with manager Tsuyoshi Otsuki, who had previously coached Nagakura at Urawa Reds Youth. On 16 August 2022, he made his professional debut in a 1–0 league defeat to Yokohama FC. He scored his first goal for the club in the following game, in a 1–0 league victory over Vegalta Sendai. He finished the 2022 season with 2 goals in 6 appearances for Thespakusatsu Gunma.

In the 2023 season, Nagakura was a key member of the team and scored 5 goals in 20 appearances in the first half of the season. At the end of July, it was announced that Nagakura would be joining J1 League club Albirex Niigata.

=== Albirex Niigata ===
As Niigata's key player Ryotaro Ito transferred mid-season, the club was looking for forward reinforcements. Nagakura made his debut for Albirex Niigata on 12 August 2023, coming on as a substitute in a 2–2 league draw with Shonan Bellmare. He scored his first J1 League goal on the final game of the season in a 1–0 victory over Cerezo Osaka. He renewed his contract in December 2023, ahead of the 2024 season.

On 4 September 2024, Nagakura scored four goals in a 5–0 J.League Cup quarter-final victory over Machida Zelvia, completing his first career hat-trick.

Nagakura finished the season as top scorer in the 2024 J.League Cup with 6 goals in 9 games. In the final, he missed a penalty as Niigata lost 5-4 on penalties to Nagoya Grampus. He also made 30 league appearances, scoring 5 goals.

=== Urawa Red Diamonds ===
In January 2025, it was announced that Nagakura would be transferring to Urawa Red Diamonds, the club where he played the majority of his youth football. On 22 February, he made his debut coming on as a substitute in a 1–1 league draw with Kyoto Sanga FC. He scored his first goal for the club in a 1–1 draw with former club Albirex Niigata.

=== Loan to FC Tokyo ===
Mid-way through his first season with Urawa Reds, Nagakura joined fellow J1 League club FC Tokyo on loan for the remainder of the 2025 season. He scored 6 goals in 14 appearances for the club, including a goal in every Emperor's Cup appearance.

=== FC Tokyo ===
Following a successful loan spell at the club, Nagakura joined FC Tokyo on a permanent deal ahead of the 2026 season. He won the October 2026 J1 Monthly MVP award, playing a pivotal role in FC Tokyo's rise to the top of the league.

== Career statistics ==
=== Club ===
As of 16 November 2026.

Appearances and goals by club, season and competition
Club	Season	League			National cup (Note: Includes Emperor's Cup)		League cup (Note: Includes J.League Cup)		Total	
Club	Season	Division	Apps	Goals	Apps	Goals	Apps	Goals	Apps	Goals
Juntendo University	2021	–			3	0	–		3	0
Tokyo United FC	2022	KSL	9	8	0	0	–		9	8
Thespakusatsu Gunma	2022	J2 League	6	2	–		–		6	2
Thespakusatsu Gunma	2023	J2 League	20	5	–		–		20	5
Thespakusatsu Gunma	Total		26	7	0	0	0	0	26	7
Albirex Niigata	2023	J1 League	10	1	0	0	0	0	10	1
Albirex Niigata	2024	J1 League	30	5	2	0	9	6	41	11
Albirex Niigata	Total		40	6	2	0	9	6	51	12
Urawa Reds	2025	J1 League	13	1	–		–		13	1
FC Tokyo (loan)	2025	J1 League	11	4	3	3	0	0	14	7
FC Tokyo	2026	J1 (100)	10	2	–		–		10	2
FC Tokyo	2026–27	J1 League	14	8	1	0	2	1	17	9
FC Tokyo	Total		24	10	1	0	2	1	27	11
Career total			123	36	9	3	11	7	143	46

== Honours ==
Individual

- Kantō Soccer League top scorer: 2022
- J1 League Monthly MVP: October 2026
