= Werik Popó =

Brazilian footballer

Personal information
- Full name: Werik Silva Pinto
- Date of birth: 17 October 2001 (age 25)
- Place of birth: São Paulo, Brazil
- Height: 1.90 m (6 ft 3 in)
- Position: Forward

Team information
- Current team: Avispa Fukuoka
- Number: 9

Youth career
- 2018: Portuguesa
- 2019: Juazeiro
- 2020: Osvaldo Cruz
- 2020–2022: Oeste

Senior career*
Years	Team	Apps	(Gls)
2021–2022	Oeste	32	(11)
2021	→ Águia de Marabá (loan)	5	(0)
2022–	Red Bull Bragantino	18	(3)
2023	Red Bull Bragantino II	0	(0)
2023	→ Suwon Samsung Bluewings (loan)	7	(0)
2024	→ Juventude (loan)	9	(0)
2024–2025	→ Criciúma (loan)	16	(3)
2025–2026	→ Fagiano Okayama (loan)	27	(3)
2026–	Avispa Fukuoka	0	(0)
- * Club domestic league appearances and goals as of 13:22, 5 August 2026 (UTC)

Werik Silva Pinto (born 17 October 2001), known as Werik Popó, is a Brazilian professional footballer who plays as a forward for J1 League club Avispa Fukuoka.

== Career ==
=== Oeste ===
Nicknamed after boxer Acelino Freitas by his mother's neighbor, Werik Popó was rejected by a number of clubs before joining Oeste's youth setup in 2020. In 2021, he moved on loan to Águia de Marabá on loan for the 2021 Campeonato Paraense, and made his senior debut with the club.

Back to Oeste, Werik Popó made his first team debut for the club on 19 June 2021, replacing Léo Artur late into a 0–0 Série C home draw against Criciúma. He alternated between the under-20 and first team squads, and was the top scorer of the 2022 Copa São Paulo de Futebol Júnior with eight goals in just six matches.

Definitely promoted to the main squad, Werik Popó scored his first senior goal on 19 February 2022, netting a last-minute winner in a 2–1 Campeonato Paulista Série A2 away win over XV de Piracicaba. On 2 March, he scored a brace in a 3–1 win at Red Bull Brasil.

=== Red Bull Bragantino ===
On 12 August 2022, Werik Popó signed a five-year contract with Série A side Red Bull Bragantino. He made his debut in the category on 18 September, replacing injured Alerrandro in a 1–1 home draw against Goiás, but being himself substituted after 37 minutes on the field.

== Career statistics ==
As of 5 August 2026

Appearances and goals by club, season and competition
Club	Season	League			State league (Note: Includes Campeonato Paulista, Campeonato Gaúcho, Campeonato Catarinense)		National cup (Note: Includes Copa do Brasil)		Continental		Other		Total	
Club	Season	Division	Apps	Goals	Apps	Goals	Apps	Goals	Apps	Goals	Apps	Goals	Apps	Goals
Oeste	2021	Série C	3	0	0	0	—		—		—		3	0
Oeste	2022	Série D	14	5	15	6	1	0	—		2 (Note: Appearance(s) in Copa Paulista)	0	32	11
Oeste	Total		17	5	15	6	1	0	0	0	2	0	35	11
Águia de Marabá (loan)	2021	Paraense	—		5	0	—		—		—		5	0
Red Bull Bragantino	2022	Série A	9 (Note: Soccerway attribute one appearance to Kauan in the match against Internacional, but the player who featured in that match was Werik Popó)	3	—		—		—		—		9	3
Red Bull Bragantino	2023	Série A	0	0	9	0	2	0	0	0	—		11	0
Red Bull Bragantino	Total		9	3	9	0	2	0	0	0	0	0	20	3
Red Bull Bragantino II	2023	Paulista A3	—		0	0	—		—		1	4	1	4
Suwon Samsung Bluewings (loan)	2023	K League 1	7	0	—		—		—		—		7	0
Juventude (loan)	2024	Série A	5	0	4	0	0	0	—		—		9	0
Criciúma (loan)	2024	Série A	1	0	0	0	0	0	—		—		1	0
Criciúma (loan)	2025	Série B	7	1	8	2	2	1	—		1 (Note: Appearance in Recopa Catarinense)	0	18	4
Criciúma (loan)	Total		8	1	8	2	2	1	0	0	1	0	19	4
Fagiano Okayama (loan)	2025	J1 League	12	0	—		0	0	—		—		12	0
Fagiano Okayama (loan)	2026	J1 (100)	15	3	—		—		—		—		15	3
Fagiano Okayama (loan)	Total		27	3	0	0	0	0	0	0	0	0	27	3
Avispa Fukuoka	2026–27	J1 League	0	0	—		0	0	—		—		0	0
Career total			73	12	41	8	5	1	0	0	4	4	123	25
