= Taiki Arai =

Japanese footballer

Taiki Arai 新井 泰貴
Personal information
- Full name: Taiki Arai
- Date of birth: 19 June 1997 (age 29)
- Place of birth: Kanagawa, Japan
- Height: 1.75 m (5 ft 9 in)
- Position: Midfielder

Team information
- Current team: Albirex Niigata
- Number: 22

Youth career
- Shonan Leone
- –2015: Shonan Bellmare

College career
Years	Team	Apps	(Gls)
2016–2019	Sanno Institute of Management		

Senior career*
Years	Team	Apps	(Gls)
2020–2023	Gainare Tottori	86	(4)
2023–2024	Fujieda MYFC	56	(0)
2025–	Albirex Niigata	39	(2)
- * Club domestic league appearances and goals as of 16 August 2026

Taiki Arai (新井 泰貴, Arai Taiki; born 19 June 1997) is a Japanese professional footballer currently playing as a midfielder for J2 League club Albirex Niigata.

== Early life ==
Arai was born in Kanagawa. He played for Shonan Leone, Shonan Bellmare and Sanno Institute of Management.

== Career ==
Arai made his league debut for Gainare against Cerezo Osaka U-23 on the 27 June 2020. He scored his first goal for the club against Fukushima United on the 23 July 2022, scoring in the 59th minute.

Arai made his league debut for Fujieda against Iwaki on the 18 February 2023.

In December 2024, it was announced that Arai would be joining J1 League club Albirex Niigata for the 2025 season.

== Career statistics ==
=== Club ===
As of end of 2024 season

Appearances and goals by club, season and competition
Club	Season	League			National Cup		League Cup		Other		Total	
Club	Season	Division	Apps	Goals	Apps	Goals	Apps	Goals	Apps	Goals	Apps	Goals
Japan			League		Emperor's Cup		J. League Cup		Other		Total	
Gainare Tottori	2020	J3 League	30	0	0	0	–		–		30	0
Gainare Tottori	2021	J3 League	25	0	1	1	–		–		26	1
Gainare Tottori	2022	J3 League	31	4	1	0	–		–		32	4
Gainare Tottori	Total		86	4	2	1	0	0	0	0	88	5
Fujieda MYFC	2023	J2 League	29	0	1	0	–		–		30	0
Fujieda MYFC	2024	J2 League	27	0	1	0	1	0	–		29	0
Fujieda MYFC	Total		56	0	2	0	1	0	0	0	59	0
Albirex Niigata	2025	J1 League	0	0	0	0	0	0	–		0	0
Career total			142	4	4	1	1	0	0	0	147	5
