= Kodjo Aziangbe =

Togolese footballer

Personal information
- Full name: Kodjo Jean Claude Aziangbe
- Date of birth: 14 December 2003 (age 22)
- Place of birth: Tsévié, Togo
- Height: 1.87 m (6 ft 2 in)
- Position: Central midfielder

Team information
- Current team: Shanghai Port (on loan from Yokohama F. Marinos)
- Number: 8

Senior career*
Years	Team	Apps	(Gls)
2021–2024	Al-Nasr	21	(0)
2023–2024	→ Zorya Luhansk (loan)	11	(0)
2024–	Yokohama F. Marinos	24	(0)
2026–	→ Shanghai Port (loan)	16	(2)

International career^{‡}
2023–	Togo	18	(0)
- * Club domestic league appearances and goals as of 15:00, 24 October 2026(UTC) ‡ National team caps and goals as of 22:00, 14 November 2026 (UTC)

Kodjo Jean Claude Aziangbe (born 14 December 2003) is a Togolese professional footballer who plays as a central midfielder for Chinese Super League club Shanghai Port, on loan from Yokohama F. Marinos, and the Togo national team.

== Career statistics ==
=== Club ===
As of matches played 3 November 2026

Appearances and goals by club, season and competition
Club	Season	League			National cup		League cup		Continental		Other		Total	
Club	Season	Division	Apps	Goals	Apps	Goals	Apps	Goals	Apps	Goals	Apps	Goals	Apps	Goals
Al-Nasr	2021–22	UAE Pro League	11	0	1	0	4	0	—		—		16	0
Al-Nasr	2022–23	UAE Pro League	10	0	0	0	5	0	—		—		15	0
Al-Nasr	Total		21	0	1	0	9	0	—		—		31	0
Zorya Luhansk (loan)	2023–24	Ukrainian Premier League	11	0	2	0	—		2 (Note: Appearances in UEFA Conference League)	0	—		15	0
Yokohama F. Marinos	2024	J1 League	3	0	2	0	0	0	1 (Note: Appearances in AFC Champions League Elite)	0	—		6	0
Yokohama F. Marinos	2025	J1 League	21	0	0	0	0	0	5	0	—		25	0
Yokohama F. Marinos	Total		24	0	2	0	0	0	6	0	—		31	0
Shanghai Port (loan)	2026	Chinese Super League	16	2	2	1	—		5	0	1 (Note: Appearance in Chinese Super Cup)	0	24	3
Career total			72	2	7	1	9	0	13	0	1	0	102	3

=== International ===
As of match played 14 November 2026

Appearances and goals by national team and year
National team	Year	Apps	Goals
Togo	2023	4	0
Togo	2024	9	0
Togo	2025	2	0
Togo	2026	3	0
Total		18	0
