= Léo Ceará =

Brazilian footballer

- Léo Ceará as Kashima Antlers player in 2026

Personal information
- Full name: Leonardo de Sousa Pereira
- Date of birth: 3 February 1995 (age 31)
- Place of birth: Fortaleza, Ceará, Brazil
- Height: 1.78 m (5 ft 10 in)
- Position: Forward

Team information
- Current team: Kashima Antlers
- Number: 9

Youth career
- 2009–2010: São Francisco-BA
- 2011–2015: Vitória

Senior career*
Years	Team	Apps	(Gls)
2014–2021	Vitória	64	(23)
2016	→ FC Ryukyu (loan)	23	(2)
2017	→ Campinense (loan)	6	(3)
2017–2018	→ Confiança (loan)	38	(14)
2019	→ CRB (loan)	32	(14)
2021–2022	Yokohama F. Marinos	58	(21)
2023–2024	Cerezo Osaka	71	(32)
2025–	Kashima Antlers	62	(42)
- * Club domestic league appearances and goals as of 14 October 2026

Leonardo de Sousa Pereira (born 3 February 1995), commonly known as Léo Ceará, is a Brazilian professional footballer who plays as a forward for J1 League club Kashima Antlers.

== Club career ==
Born in Fortaleza, Ceará, Léo Ceará joined Vitória's youth setup in 2011, from São Francisco-BA. He made his first team debut on 23 January 2014, coming on as a late substitute for Alan Pinheiro in a 3–1 away win against Confiança, for the year's Copa do Nordeste.

On 12 January 2016, after being rarely used, Léo Ceará was loaned to J3 League club FC Ryukyu for the season. Upon returning, he joined Campinense also in a temporary deal in February 2017, but moved to Confiança in May to play in the Série C.

Léo Ceará's loan with Confiança was renewed for a further year on 27 December 2017, and he subsequently scored 16 goals in all competitions for the club before being recalled by Vitória in August 2018.

Léo Ceará made his Série A debut on 23 August 2018, starting in a 0–1 away loss against Flamengo. He scored his first goal in the category three days later, netting the winner in a 1–0 home success over Atlético Mineiro, and subsequently renewed his contract until 2020 on the 28th.

On 15 May 2019, after the arrival of Neto Baiano, Léo Ceará was loaned to fellow Série B side CRB until December. He returned to Vitória in January 2020 after scoring 14 league goals for CRB, being the club's top goalscorer and the third-best overall, but was demoted to the under-23 squad after failing to agree new terms over a new contract.

Léo Ceará was only included back at Vitória's main squad in August 2020.

Yokohama F. Marinos announced on 23 January 2021 that Léo Ceará will be joining the club on a full transfer pending a medical to be performed upon arrival Japan (delayed for an indefinite period due to coronavirus immigration restrictions). He was included in the Vitória squad for the last time on 26 January 2021. Ceará left the club in 2022 after two years at Yokohama F. Marinos.

On 27 December 2022, Ceará officially transferred to Cerezo Osaka for the upcoming 2023 season.

After two seasons at Cerezo, on 6 January 2025 it was announced that Ceará would be transferring to fellow J1 League club Kashima Antlers for the 2025 season.

== Career statistics ==
As of match played 14 June 2025

Club	Season	League			State league (Note: Includes Campeonato Baiano, Campeonato Paraibano, Campeonato Sergipano)		National cup (Note: Includes Copa do Brasil, Emperor's Cup)		League cup (Note: Includes J.League Cup)		Continental		Other		Total	
Club	Season	Division	Apps	Goals	Apps	Goals	Apps	Goals	Apps	Goals	Apps	Goals	Apps	Goals	Apps	Goals
Vitória	2014	Série A	0	0	—		0	0	—		—		1 (Note: Appearance(s) in Copa do Nordeste)	0	1	0
Vitória	2015	Série B	4	0	0	0	0	0	—		—		0	0	4	0
Vitória	2018	Série A	17	5	—		—		—		—		—		17	5
Vitória	2019	Série B	1	0	9	2	1	0	—		—		7	1	18	3
Vitória	2020	Série B	33	16	0	0	4	2	—		—		5	2	42	20
Vitória	Total		55	21	9	2	5	2	—		—		13	3	82	28
FC Ryukyu (loan)	2016	J3 League	23	2	—		—		—		—		—		23	2
Campinense (loan)	2017	Série D	0	0	6	3	—		—		—		3	1	9	4
Confiança (loan)	2017	Série C	10	1	—		—		—		—		—		10	1
Confiança (loan)	2018	Série C	17	9	11	4	0	0	—		—		6	3	34	16
Confiança (loan)	Total		50	12	17	7	0	0	—		—		9	4	76	23
CRB (loan)	2019	Série B	32	14	—		—		—		—		—		32	14
Yokohama F. Marinos	2021	J1 League	27	10	—		1	1	4	2	—		—		32	13
Yokohama F. Marinos	2022	J1 League	31	11	—		2	1	2	2	4 (Note: Appearances in AFC Champions League)	2	—		39	16
Yokohama F. Marinos	Total		90	35	—		3	2	6	4	4	2	—		103	43
Cerezo Osaka	2023	J1 League	33	12	—		3	2	5	0	—		—		41	14
Cerezo Osaka	2024	J1 League	38	21	—		1	0	3	0	—		—		42	21
Cerezo Osaka	Total		71	33	—		4	2	8	0	—		—		83	35
Kashima Antlers	2025	J1 League	34	21	—		0	0	1	0	—		—		35	21
Kashima Antlers	2026	J1 100 Year Vision League	20	10	—		0	0	0	0	—		—		20	10
Kashima Antlers	2026–27	J1 League	1	2	—		0	0	0	0	0	0	—		1	2
Kashima Antlers	Total		55	33	—		0	0	1	0	—		—		56	33
Career total			321	135	26	9	12	6	15	4	4	2	22	7	400	162

== Honours ==
=== Club ===
Yokohama F. Marinos

- J1 League: 2022

Kashima Antlers

- J1 League: 2025

=== Individual ===
- J1 League Monthly MVP: February/March 2025,
- J.League Top Scorer: 2025
- J.League Best XI: 2025
- J1 100 Year Vision League Top Scorer: 2026
- J1 100 Year Vision League Regional Round East Best Eleven: 2026
