= Marcelo Ryan =

Brazilian footballer

Personal information
- Full name: Marcelo Ryan Silvestre dos Santos
- Date of birth: 8 June 2002 (age 24)
- Place of birth: Aracaju, Sergipe, Brazil
- Height: 1.88 m (6 ft 2 in)
- Position: Forward

Team information
- Current team: FC Tokyo (on loan from Sagan Tosu)
- Number: 19

Youth career
- –2019: Confiança

Senior career*
| Years | Team | Apps | (Gls) |
| 2019 | Confiança | 0 | (0) |
| 2020–2022 | Bahia | 4 | (0) |
| 2022–2023 | Yokohama FC | 32 | (5) |
| 2024– | Sagan Tosu | 30 | (14) |
| 2025– | → FC Tokyo (loan) | 25 | (7) |
- * Club domestic league appearances and goals as of 16 September 2025

Marcelo Ryan Silvestre dos Santos (born 8 June 2002) commonly known as Marcelo Ryan is a Brazilian footballer who plays as a forward for J1 League club, FC Tokyo, on loan from Sagan Tosu.

== Career ==
On 8 August 2022, Marcelo Ryan was abroad to Japan for the first time and signing to J2 club, Yokohama FC for mid 2022 season.

On 7 January 2024, Marcelo Ryan was announce official transfer to J1 club, Sagan Tosu for 2024 season.

On 4 January 2025, Marcelo Ryan was announce official loan transfer to fellow J1 club, FC Tokyo for 2025 season.

== Career statistics ==
=== Club ===
As of the start for 2025 season.

| Club | Season | League | | | State League | | Cup | | League Cup | | Continental | | Other | | Total | |
| Club | Season | Division | Apps | Goals | Apps | Goals | Apps | Goals | Apps | Goals | Apps | Goals | Apps | Goals | Apps | Goals |
|---|---|---|---|---|---|---|---|---|---|---|---|---|---|---|---|---|
| Confiança | 2019 | – | | | 0 | 0 | 0 | 0 | – | | | | 1 (Note: Appearances in the Copa do Nordeste) | 0 | 1 | 0 |
| Bahia | 2020 | Série A | 1 | 0 | 0 | 0 | 0 | 0 | – | | | | 0 | 0 | 1 | 0 |
| Bahia | 2021 | Série A | 0 | 0 | 11 (Note: Appearances in the Campeonato Baiano) | 2 | 0 | 0 | – | | 1 (Note: Appearances in the Copa Sudamericana) | 2 | 1 | 1 | 13 | 5 |
| Bahia | 2022 | Série B | 3 | 0 | 8 | 1 | 3 (Note: Appearances in the Copa do Brasil) | 1 | – | | | | 1 | 0 | 15 | 2 |
| Bahia | Total | | 4 | 0 | 19 | 3 | 3 | 1 | – | | 1 | 2 | 3 | 1 | 30 | 7 |
| Yokohama FC | 2022 | J2 League | 9 | 2 | – | | 0 | 0 | – | | | | 0 | 0 | 9 | 2 |
| Yokohama FC | 2023 | J1 League | 23 | 3 | – | | 0 | 0 | 6 (Note: Appearances in the J.League Cup) | 1 | – | | 0 | 0 | 29 | 4 |
| Sagan Tosu | 2024 | J1 League | 30 | 14 | – | | 2 (Note: Appearances in the Emperor's Cup) | 0 | 1 | 1 | – | | 0 | 0 | 33 | 15 |
| FC Tokyo (loan) | 2025 | J1 League | 0 | 0 | – | | 0 | 0 | 0 | 0 | – | | 0 | 0 | 0 | 0 |
| Career total | | | 66 | 19 | 19 | 3 | 5 | 1 | 7 | 2 | 1 | 2 | 3 | 1 | 101 | 28 |
