= Akito Suzuki =

Japanese footballer

Akito Suzuki 鈴木 章斗
Personal information
- Full name: Akito Suzuki
- Date of birth: 30 July 2003 (age 23)
- Place of birth: Higashiōsaka, Osaka, Japan
- Height: 1.78 m (5 ft 10 in)
- Position: Forward

Team information
- Current team: Sanfrecce Hiroshima
- Number: 10

Youth career
- –2015: Diablossa Osaka
- 2016–2018: Gamba Osaka
- 2019–2021: Hannan University High School

Senior career*
Years	Team	Apps	(Gls)
2022–2025	Shonan Bellmare	100	(22)
2026–	Sanfrecce Hiroshima	21	(6)
- * Club domestic league appearances and goals as of 9 August 2026

Akito Suzuki (鈴木 章斗, Suzuki Akito; born 30 July 2003) is a Japanese footballer currently playing as a forward for J1 League club Sanfrecce Hiroshima.

== Early life ==
Akito was born in Osaka. He played for Diablossa Osaka and Gamba Osaka's youth teams, before studying and playing on U-18 level at Hannan University High School.

== Career ==
Akito made his debut for Shonan against Sanfrecce Hiroshima, coming off in the 63rd minute on the 2nd of April 2022. He scored his first goal for Shonan against Yokohama F. Marinos on the 15th of April 2023, scoring in the 81st minute.

== Career statistics ==
=== Club ===
As of 1 April 2026.

Appearances and goals by club, season and competition
Club	Season	League			National cup (Note: Includes Emperors Cup)		League cup (Note: Includes J.League Cup)		Continental		Total	
Club	Season	Division	Apps	Goals	Apps	Goals	Apps	Goals	Apps	Goals	Apps	Goals
Shonan Bellmare	2022	J1 League	2	0	1	1	4	0	–		7	1
Shonan Bellmare	2023	J1 League	27	3	4	5	6	2	–		37	10
Shonan Bellmare	2024	J1 League	34	10	3	2	0	0	–		37	12
Shonan Bellmare	2025	J1 League	37	9	2	1	7	3	–		46	13
Shonan Bellmare	Total		100	22	10	9	17	5	0	0	127	36
Sanfrecce Hiroshima	2026	J1 (100)	8	2	–		–		4 (Note: Appearances in AFC Champions League Elite)	2	12	4
Career total			108	24	10	9	17	5	4	2	139	40
