= Yuto Baigorria =

Bolivian footballer (born 2004)

Personal information
- Full name: Yuto Edward Baigorria Nishizawa
- Date of birth: 18 August 2006 (age 20)
- Place of birth: Bolivia
- Height: 1.72 m (5 ft 8 in)
- Position: Midfielder

Team information
- Current team: Guabirá
- Number: 28

Youth career
- Alhama
- Guabirá

Senior career*
Years	Team	Apps	(Gls)
2025–	Guabirá	26	(0)
2025–2026	→ Fagiano Okayama (loan)	0	(0)
- * Club domestic league appearances and goals as of 11:09, 5 October 2026 (UTC)

Yuto Edward Baigorria Nishizawa (born 18 August 2006) is a Bolivian professional footballer who plays as a midfielder for Guabirá.

== Early life ==
Baigorria was born on 18 August 2006 in Bolivia. Of Japanese descent through his parents, he started playing football at the age of seven.

== Career ==
As a youth player, Baigorria joined the youth academy of Spanish side Alhama. Following his stint there, he joined the youth academy of Bolivian side Guabirá and was promoted to the club's senior team ahead of the 2025 season. Bolivian newspaper wrote in 2025 that he "has become one of the most exciting players in Bolivian football" while playing for the club.

During the summer of 2025, he was sent on loan to Japanese side Fagiano Okayama.
