= Ryō Takeuchi =

Japanese footballer (born 1991)

Ryō Takeuchi 竹内 涼
Personal information
- Date of birth: 8 March 1991 (age 35)
- Place of birth: Shizuoka, Japan
- Height: 1.73 m (5 ft 8 in)
- Position: Defensive midfielder

Team information
- Current team: Fagiano Okayama
- Number: 7

Youth career
- Hamamatsu Ryuzenji FC
- Hamamatsu JFC
- –2005: Hamamatsu Kaiseikan Jr. High School
- 2006–2008: Hamamatsu Kaiseikan High School

Senior career*
Years	Team	Apps	(Gls)
2009–2023	Shimizu S-Pulse	240	(3)
2012	→ Giravanz Kitakyushu (loan)	30	(3)
2024–	Fagiano Okayama	38	(0)
Medal record
Shimizu S-Pulse
Runner-up	Emperor's Cup	2010
- * Club domestic league appearances and goals as of 12 August 2026

Ryō Takeuchi (竹内 涼, Takeuchi Ryō; born 8 March 1991) is a Japanese professional footballer who plays as a defensive midfielder and captain for J1 League club, Fagiano Okayama.

== Career ==
From 2009 to 2023, Takeuchi played for Shimizu S-Pulse, playing almost 300 games for the club across all competitions.

In 2012, Takeuchi was joined to Giravanz Kitakyushu on loan.

In December 2023, Takeuchi transferred to Fagiano Okayama. Ahead of the 2024 season, he was named captain of his new club. On 7 December 2024, he was helped his club secure promotion to J1 League for the first time in its history from next season after defeat Vegalta Sendai 2–0 in promotion play-off final.

== Career statistics ==
As of the match played 22 February 2025.

Appearances and goals by club, season and competition
Club	Season	League			Emperor's Cup		J. League Cup		Total	
Club	Season	Division	Apps	Goals	Apps	Goals	Apps	Goals	Apps	Goals
Shimizu S-Pulse	2009	J.League Div 1	0	0	0	0	0	0	0	0
Shimizu S-Pulse	2010	J.League Div 1	0	0	0	0	0	0	0	0
Shimizu S-Pulse	2011	J.League Div 1	1	0	2	1	0	0	3	1
Shimizu S-Pulse	2013	J.League Div 1	26	0	3	0	4	0	33	0
Shimizu S-Pulse	2014	J.League Div 1	18	0	0	0	6	0	24	0
Shimizu S-Pulse	2015	J1 League	19	0	1	0	5	0	25	0
Shimizu S-Pulse	2016	J2 League	30	0	2	0	–		32	0
Shimizu S-Pulse	2017	J1 League	24	0	3	2	1	0	28	2
Shimizu S-Pulse	2018	J1 League	24	1	0	0	1	0	25	1
Shimizu S-Pulse	2019	J1 League	30	0	4	0	1	0	35	0
Shimizu S-Pulse	2020	J1 League	25	2	0	0	1	0	26	2
Shimizu S-Pulse	2021	J1 League	29	0	2	0	6	0	37	0
Shimizu S-Pulse	2022	J1 League	11	0	2	0	3	0	16	0
Shimizu S-Pulse	2023	J2 League	3	0	1	0	–		4	0
Giravanz Kitakyushu (loan)	2012	J.League Div 2	30	3	1	0	–		31	3
Fagiano Okayama	2024	J2 League	22	0	0	0	1	0	23	0
Fagiano Okayama	2025	J1 League	2	0	0	0	0	0	2	0
Career total			294	6	21	3	29	0	344	9

== Honours ==
Fagiano Okayama

- J2 League Promotion play-off winner: 2024
