= Luka Didulica =

Dutch footballer (born 2007)

Personal information
- Date of birth: 18 September 2007 (age 19)
- Place of birth: Alkmaar, Netherlands
- Height: 2.00 m (6 ft 7 in)
- Position: Central defender

Team information
- Current team: Urawa Red Diamonds

Youth career
- North Geelong Warriors
- Melbourne Victory

Senior career*
Years	Team	Apps	(Gls)
2025	Melbourne Victory NPL	5	(0)
2026–	Urawa Red Diamonds	0	(0)

International career^{‡}
2026–	Australia U20	5	(0)
- * Club domestic league appearances and goals as of 22 October 2025 ‡ National team caps and goals as of 13 June 2026

Luka Didulica (born 18 September 2007) is an Australian professional footballer who currently plays as a central defender for J1 League club Urawa Red Diamonds.

== Early life ==
Didulica was born on 18 September 2007 in Alkmaar, Netherlands. Growing up in Geelong, Australia, he is the son of Croatia international Joey Didulica.

== Career ==
As a youth player, Didulica joined the youth academy of Australian side North Geelong Warriors FC. Following his stint there, he joined the youth academy of Australian side Melbourne Victory FC and was promoted to the club's reserve team in 2025.

Ahead of the 2026–27 J1 League season, he signed for Japanese side Urawa Red Diamonds.

== Style of play ==
Didulica plays as a central defender. Australian newspaper Geelong Advertiser wrote in 2024 that he "possesses some of the best foot skills going around, mixed with intelligence and a passing range off the chart".

== Personal life ==
He is eligible to represent either Australia, Croatia or the Netherlands internationally.
