= Rafael Elias =

Brazilian footballer (born 1999)

Personal information
- Full name: Rafael Elias da Silva
- Date of birth: 12 April 1999 (age 27)
- Place of birth: São Paulo, Brazil
- Height: 1.79 m (5 ft 10 in)
- Position: Striker

Team information
- Current team: Kyoto Sanga
- Number: 9

Youth career
- 2014: Portuguesa
- 2016–2018: Palmeiras

Senior career*
Years	Team	Apps	(Gls)
2018–2023	Palmeiras	14	(2)
2019	→ Atlético Mineiro (loan)	6	(0)
2019	→ Goiás (loan)	4	(0)
2021	→ Cuiabá (loan)	10	(1)
2022	→ Ituano (loan)	36	(15)
2022–2023	→ Baniyas (loan)	16	(4)
2023–2024	Cruzeiro	24	(4)
2024	→ Kyoto Sanga (loan)	15	(11)
2025–	Kyoto Sanga	42	(25)

International career^{‡}
2018–2019	Brazil U20	4	(0)
- * Club domestic league appearances and goals as of 1 August 2026 ‡ National team caps and goals as of 27 July 2023

Rafael Elias da Silva (born 12 April 1999), known as Rafael Elias or Papagaio, is a Brazilian footballer who plays as a striker for J1 League club Kyoto Sanga. He was signed permanently by Sanga in the summer of 2024 following a successful spell on loan from Cruzeiro.

== Career statistics ==
As of 19 October 2025

Appearances and goals by club, season and competition
Club	Season	League			State League		National Cup (Note: Includes UAE President's Cup, Emperor's Cup)		League Cup (Note: Includes UAE League Cup, J.League Cup)		Continental		Other		Total	
Club	Season	Division	Apps	Goals	Apps	Goals	Apps	Goals	Apps	Goals	Apps	Goals	Apps	Goals	Apps	Goals
Palmeiras	2018	Série A	2	0	3 (Note: Appearances in Campeonato Paulista)	1	0	0	—		—		—		5	1
Palmeiras	2021	Série A	0	0	9	1	0	0	—		0	0	0	0	9	1
Palmeiras	Total		2	0	12	2	0	0	0	0	0	0	0	0	14	2
Atlético Mineiro (loan)	2019	Série A	5	0	1 (Note: Appearances in Campeonato Mineiro)	0	0	0	—		1 (Note: Appearances in the Copa Sudamericana)	0	—		7	0
Goiás (loan)	2019	Série A	4	0	0	0	0	0	—		—		—		4	0
Cuiabá (loan)	2021	Série A	10	1	0	0	0	0	—		—		1 (Note: Appearance(s) in Copa Verde)	0	11	1
Ituano (loan)	2022	Série B	22	10	14	5	0	0	—		—		—		36	15
Baniyas (loan)	2022–23	UAE Pro League	16	4	—		2	0	2	3	—		—		18	7
Cruzeiro	2023	Série A	12	1	0	0	0	0	—		—		—		12	1
Cruzeiro	2024	Série A	5	1	7	2	0	0	—		4	1	—		16	2
Cruzeiro	Total		17	2	7	2	0	0	0	0	4	1	0	0	28	3
Kyoto Sanga (loan)	2024	J1 League	15	11	—		2	0	0	0	—		—		17	11
Kyoto Sanga	2025	J1 League	24	17	—		2	1	1	1	—		—		27	19
Career total			115	45	34	9	6	1	3	4	5	1	1	0	162	58

== Honours ==
Individual

- J.League Best XI: 2025
- J1 League Monthly MVP: April 2025
