= Jeison Quiñones (footballer, born 1997) =

Colombian footballer (born 1997)

Personal information
- Full name: Jeison Estiven Quiñones Botina
- Date of birth: 17 August 1997 (age 29)
- Place of birth: Cali, Colombia
- Height: 1.87 m (6 ft 2 in)
- Position: Defender

Team information
- Current team: Yokohama F. Marinos
- Number: 17

Youth career
- –2015: Bogotá FC

Senior career*
Years	Team	Apps	(Gls)
2016–2018	Bogotá FC	61	(1)
2018–2019	Atlético Bucaramanga	24	(0)
2019–2024	Águilas Doradas	147	(15)
2021	→ Deportivo Pasto (loan)	19	(0)
2025–	Yokohama F. Marinos	41	(3)
- * Club domestic league appearances and goals as of 11 August 2026

Jeison Estiven Quiñones Botina (born 17 August 1997) is a Colombian professional footballer who plays as a defender for Yokohama F. Marinos.

== Career ==
As a youth player, Quiñones joined the youth academy of Colombian side Bogotá FC and was promoted to the club's senior team in 2018. In 2018, he signed for Colombian side Atlético Bucaramanga. Subsequently, he signed for Colombian side Águilas Doradas. While playing for the club, Spanish news website Vavel wrote that he "was one of the most outstanding center backs in the League, showing his potential and technique".

During the summer of 2021, he was sent on loan to Colombian side Deportivo Pasto, where he made nineteen league appearances and scored zero goals. Four years later, he signed for Japanese side Yokohama F. Marinos.

== Style of play ==
Quiñones plays as a defender and is right-footed. Known for his speed and aerial ability, he has been nicknamed the "Beast".
