= Intelligent Actuator =

Japanese robotics design company

IAI (International Automation Industry)
- Type: Private company KK
- Industry: Manufacturing, robotics, automation
- Founded: 1976
- Headquarters: Shizuoka Prefecture, Japan
- Area served: Worldwide
- Website: www.intelligentactuator.com

Intelligent Actuator, also called IAI, is a robotics design company. It was founded in Japan in 1976. The company designs, manufactures, and markets a complete line of motion control systems. IAI is the world's largest manufacturer of cartesian coordinate robots and is an established leader in low cost, high performance SCARA robots.

With the introduction in 2001 of a full range of "ROBO Cylinders", IAI is also leading a transition away from pneumatics to cost-effective, low-maintenance, and fully programmable electric cylinders.

IAI Industrieroboter GmbH is the European subsidiary of IAI, founded in 1995.

IAI America, Inc. was established in 1989. IAI products are distributed in North America through a network of authorized representatives supported by regional centers in Los Angeles, California, Chicago, Illinois, and Atlanta, Georgia.
