= Star Micronics =

Japanese electronics manufacturer

Star Micronics Co., Ltd. スター精密株式会社
- Company type: Public
- Traded as: TYO 7718.T
- Industry: Electronics and printers
- Founded: Tegoshi, Shizuoka, Japan; 1947; 79 years ago
- Headquarters: Shizuoka, Japan
- Key people: Hajime Sato (President and CEO)
- Products: printers, electronic components, precision parts
- Revenue: ▲¥35,717 million (£267 million) (Year ended 28 February 2011)
- Number of employees: Approx 2,500
- Website: Star Micronics Co., Ltd.

Star Micronics Co., Ltd. (スター精密株式会社, Sutā Seimitsu Kabushiki-gaisha) is a Japanese multinational electronic components and printer manufacturing company headquartered in Shizuoka, Japan. It was founded in 1947 as a precision processor of miniature components, later expanding into automatic lathes, printers, micro audio components, and other fields.

Star Micronics employs around 2,500 staff in several countries and had total revenues of £267 million in 2010.

== History ==
Star Manufacturing Co., Ltd. was established in 1950 with a capital of ¥ 500,000, in Tegoshi, Shizuoka, to manufacture and sell wristwatches and camera parts.

After introduction of their LC series dot matrix printer range in the 1980s they came to dominate the printer market for home computers. In the mid-1990s home computers became outcompeted by East Asia-manufactured IBM PC derivatives, and dot matrix printers were outcompeted by bubble jet printers. Star re-oriented their business to focus on the point-of-sale market only, manufacturing peripherals such as small thermal transfer receipt printers and cash drawers.

In May 2022, Star Micronics introduced its TSP100IV, a thermal POS receipt printer which offers features for omnichannel retailing. The features also extend to its TSP143IV UE model, which provides multi-connectivity for mobile, cloud, and traditional POS applications.

== Products ==
The following is a partial list of products manufactured under the Star Micronics brand.

=== Printers ===
==== Dot Matrix Printers ====
- Star NX-2420
- Star LC-10
- Star LC-10C (Colour)
- Star LC-2410

==== Desktop Printers ====
- TSP143IV
- SP742
- TSP743II
- TSP847II

==== Kiosk & Portable Printers ====
- SK1
- SM-S230i
- SM-T300i
- SM-T400i
