= Daiwa Securities Group =

Japanese company

Daiwa Securities Group Inc.

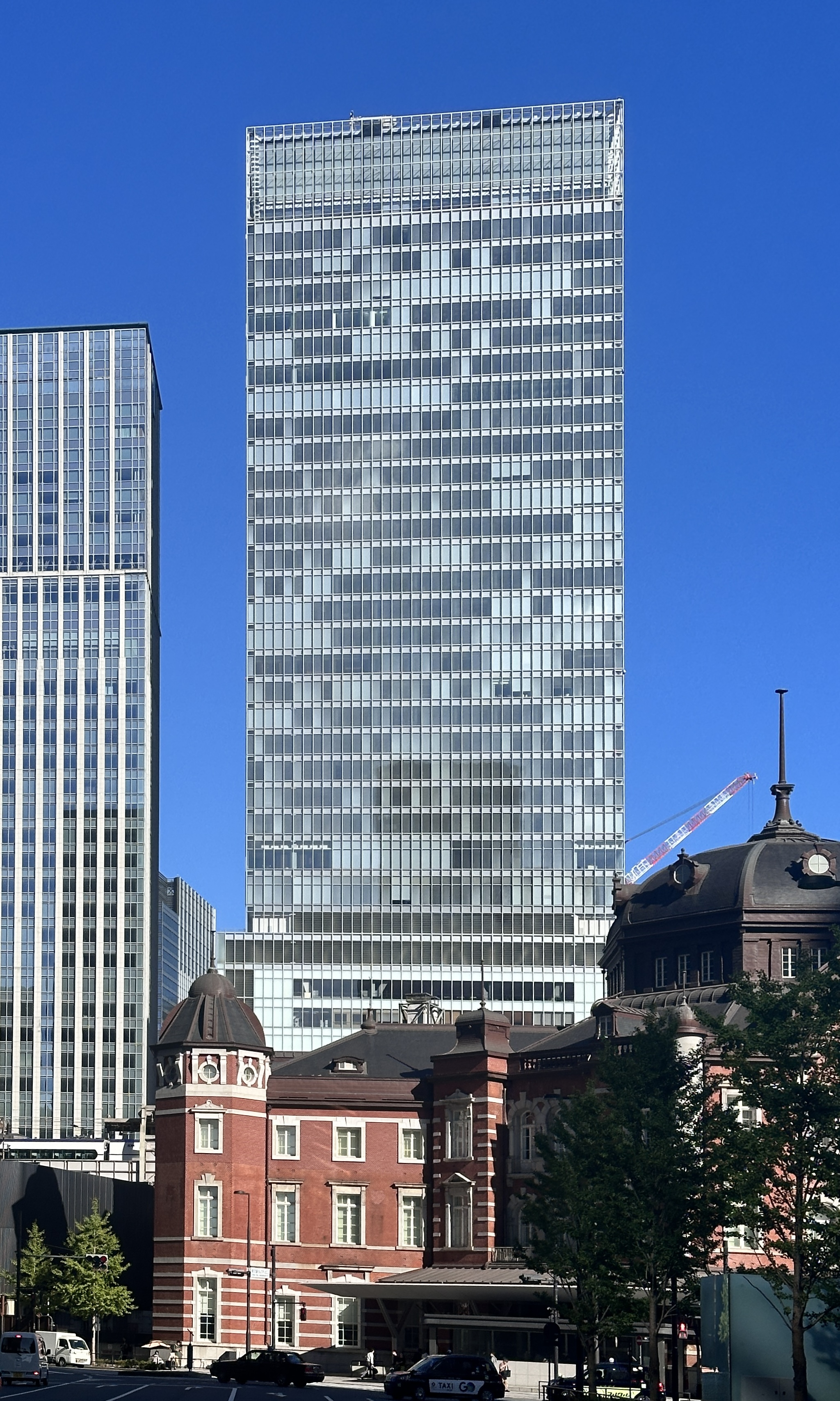
- Headquarters at GranTokyo in Marunouchi, Chiyoda, Tokyo
- Type: Public (K.K)
- Traded as: TYO: 8601; TOPIX Large 70 Component
- Industry: Investment banking
- Founded: 1943; 83 years ago
- Headquarters: Tokyo, Japan
- Key people: Hibino Takashi (President and CEO)
- Products: Financial services Investment banking Investment management Brokerage firm
- Total assets: $196.7 billion (2015)
- Number of employees: 14,889 (at March 2022)
- Subsidiaries: DC Advisory
- Website: www.daiwa-grp.jp/english/

Daiwa Securities Group Inc. (大和証券グループ本社, Daiwa Shōken Gurūpu Honsha) is a Japanese investment bank that is Japan's second largest securities brokerage after Nomura Securities.

Major subsidiaries include Daiwa Securities, which offers retail services such as online trading to individual investors and investment banking services in Japan, as well as Daiwa Capital Markets, the firm's international investment banking arm (with a presence across Asia, Europe and North America) that provides M&A advisory, sales and trading services in a variety of financial products to corporate and institutional clients. Other group companies provide asset management, research and private equity fund services.

== History ==
=== Daiwa Securities SB Capital Markets ===
The company was founded in 1999 as Daiwa Securities SB Capital Markets Co. Ltd., a joint venture between Daiwa Securities Group (Daiwa) and Sumitomo Bank (SB). It was renamed in 2001 to Daiwa Securities SMBC Co. Ltd., after Sumitomo Bank merged with Sakura Bank on 1 April 2001 to form Sumitomo Mitsui Banking Corporation (SMBC), a wholly owned subsidiary of Sumitomo Mitsui Financial Group (SMFG). However, in 2010, SMBC acquired Nikko Cordial (Japan's third-largest brokerage at that time).

=== Daiwa Securities Capital Markets Company ===
Following this step, Daiwa dissolved the joint-venture with SMBC and re-acquired 100% of the shares in the company, before renaming it again as Daiwa Securities Capital Markets Co. Ltd. Finally, about two years later, the company was absorbed in a merger, leaving Daiwa Securities Co. Ltd as the sole entity.

=== DC Advisory ===
In May 2009, Daiwa acquired the corporate finance division of Close Brothers Group. In 2010, it was renamed to DC Advisory and now acts as the corporate finance arm of Daiwa.

== Member companies ==
- Daiwa Financial Holdings Co., Ltd.
- Daiwa Securities Co., Ltd.
- Daiwa Asset Management Co., Ltd.
- Daiwa Institute of Research Ltd.
- Daiwa SB Investments Ltd.
- Daiwa Securities Business Center Co., Ltd.
- The Daiwa Property Co. Ltd.
- Daiwa Capital Markets America Inc.
- Daiwa Capital Markets Europe Ltd.

== Projects ==
In July 2012, Daiwa Securities Group was chosen by the Central Bank of Myanmar to spearhead a $380-million project designed to develop an IT network for the Myanmar government that would connect all ministries as well as schools and hospitals to a cloud computing system and would also entail a secure online banking system for the country.

In December 2024, Daiwa Securities announced its aims to raise wages by 5% to attract new talents to its company. The initiative was expected to begin by April, 2025.

== See also ==
- Daiwa Anglo-Japanese Foundation
