= Daicel =

Japanese chemical company

Daicel Corporation 株式会社ダイセル
- Company type: Public KK
- Traded as: TYO: 4202
- Industry: Chemical
- Founded: (September 8, 1919; 105 years ago)
- Headquarters: Kita-ku, Osaka 530-0011 (Osaka head office); Minato-ku, Tokyo 108-8230 (Tokyo head office), Japan
- Area served: Worldwide
- Key people: Misao Fudaba (President and CEO)
- Products: Cellulosic derivatives; Organic chemicals; Plastics; Industrial pyrotechnic devices; Water treatment systems
- Revenue: ▲JPY 412.83 billion (FY 2019) (US$ 3.95 billion) (FY 2019)
- Net income: ▲JPY 4.98 billion (FY 2019) (US$ 47.63 million) (FY 2019)
- Number of employees: 11,606 (2019)
- Website: Official website

Daicel Corporation (株式会社ダイセル, Kabushiki gaisha Daiseru) is a chemical company based in Japan. It operates business in celluloid technologies, organic chemicals, high-performance chemicals, polymers and pyrotechnic devices. The company's products include cellulose acetate, tow for cigarette filters, high-performance chemicals, engineering plastics like liquid crystal polymers (LPCs), resin compounds, and automotive airbag inflators.

The company formed under the name of Dainippon Celluloid Company from a 1919 merger of eight regional celluloid manufacturers and changed its name to the present one in 1966. Its first subsidiary, Fuji Photo Film, was set up in 1934 to produce nitrocellulose film. Eventually this company became Fujifilm.

As of early 2020, Daicel owned a majority stake in Polyplastics. By the end of 2020, Daicel purchased the remaining minority stake from Celanese and attained 100% ownership of Polyplastics.
