= Arthur Papas =

Australian association football player and manager

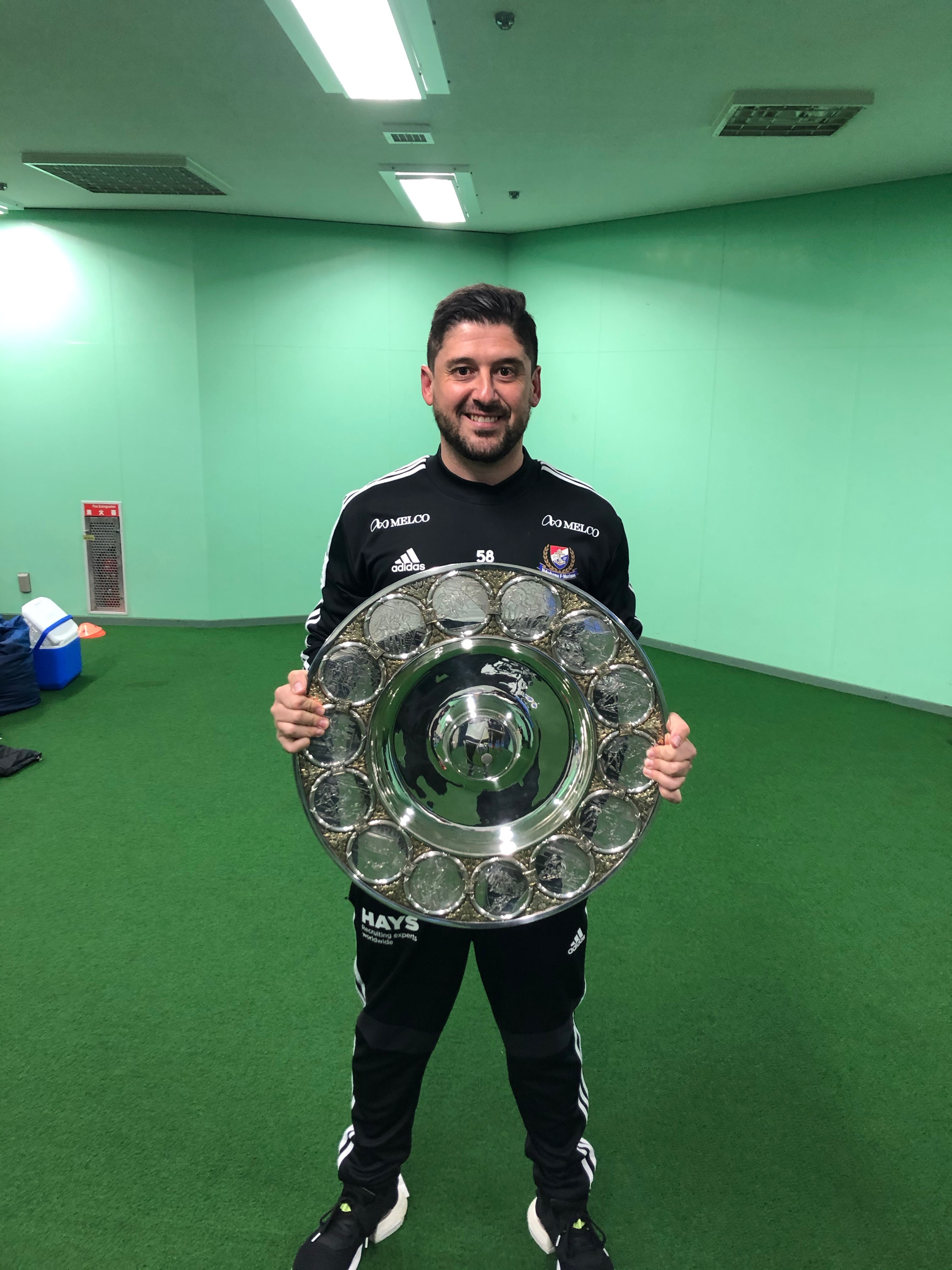
- Papas with Yokohama F. Marinos in 2020

Personal information
- Full name: Arthur Thomas Papastamatis
- Date of birth: 12 February 1980 (age 46)
- Place of birth: Melbourne, Australia

Team information
- Current team: Al-Ettifaq (manager)

Managerial career
- Years: Team
- 2010–2011: Oakleigh Cannons
- 2010–2011: Australia U17
- 2011–2012: India U23
- 2015–2016: Oakleigh Cannons
- 2016–2017: Green Gully
- 2021: Kagoshima United
- 2021–2023: Newcastle Jets
- 2023–2024: Buriram United
- 2024–2026: Cerezo Osaka
- 2026–: Al-Ettifaq

Arthur Papastamatis (born 12 February 1980), also known as Arthur Papas, is an Australian-Greek professional soccer manager who is the current manager of Saudi Pro League club Al-Ettifaq.

== Background & Education ==
Papas began developing his coaching skills at the age of 16 while still a player. He continued his coaching education after retiring as a player at 25, following six knee operations. After his playing career ended, he focused on gaining the qualifications and practical experience required to work as a professional football coach.

In 2008, Papas furthered his coaching education through a KNVB-run course in Canberra. During the course, he was identified by KNVB instructors as a potential professional coach and was recommended for the Australian Sports Commission Coaching Scholarship Award. He accepted the award and moved to Canberra as part of the High Performance Coaching Program, which was designed to develop coaches working with athletes in elite sport. Papas holds the AFC Pro Coaching Licence, a master's degree in Sports Coaching, and a Bachelor of Applied Science — Exercise.

== Greek Heritage ==
Papas's family background originates in Greece, and he has maintained ties to his Greek heritage. He also holds a Greek passport. His coaching career and Greek background have periodically attracted interest from Greek sporting media, and he has been interviewed about his connection to Greece and his longer-term interest in coaching there.

== Career ==
=== Australian Institute of Sport ===
In 2009, Papas accepted the role of AIS Men's Football Scholarship Coach after being identified by Football Federation Australia technical directors Rob Baan and Han Berger as a potential elite-level coach. The award had been held by only a small number of Australians in the game's history, and Papas relocated from Melbourne to Canberra to work at the Australian Institute of Sport under Dutch coach Jan Versleijen.

During this period, Papas gained experience in a high-performance environment and worked with some of Australia's leading youth players. He also worked with Australian national youth teams as both a technical analyst and coach. Papas has described this period as an important stage in his development as a professional coach.

=== Oakleigh Cannons ===
In late 2010, Papas, then 30 years of age, was appointed manager of Victorian Premier League side Oakleigh Cannons FC for the 2011 Victorian Premier League season. He was the youngest coach in the Victorian Premier League at the time. His first match in charge was on 18 February 2011 against Northcote City SC, which Oakleigh won 3–2.

Papas led the Cannons to equal first place at the end of the 2011 season, qualifying the club for its first finals appearance in three seasons. Oakleigh subsequently reached its first Grand Final, losing 3–2 after extra time. Papas was voted Victorian Premier League Coach of the Year, becoming the youngest recipient of the award in the league's history.

=== Newcastle Jets ===
At the end of 2011, Papas was recruited by A-League side Newcastle Jets as first-team assistant coach and National Youth League head coach. At Newcastle, he was reunited with former Australian Institute of Sport coach and Australian under-17 assistant coach Gary van Egmond.

Papas inherited the youth team midway through the season and improved the results whilst promoting several players to the first team. He also assisted the Newcastle Jets first team to a seventh-place finish in a rebuilding year under the club's new technical regime. Papas later resigned to accept the role of head coach of the India under-23 men's national team.

=== Indian under-23 national team ===
Papas moved to India after an invitation from All India Football Federation technical director Rob Baan, initially with a view to becoming the AIFF-FIFA Academy head coach in Vashi. The academy was part of a wider AIFF and FIFA development program for under-14 players in India.

Papas took charge of the Indian under-23 national team for an AFC tournament in Oman. Implementing an attacking style of play which saw the lowest ranked nation defeat Turkmenistan 5–2, Lebanon 4–1 as well drawing with the UAE who were ranked 100 places above. After the tournament, he said that while India had been the lowest-ranked nation in the group, the team had remained in contention to reach the quarter finals with 35 minutes remaining in its final match, and that the experience would be important for the players' development in higher-pressure international matches.

=== Return to Oakleigh Cannons ===
After returning to Australia from India, Papas returned to Oakleigh Cannons following the resignation of Miron Bleiberg during the 2015 National Premier Leagues Victoria season. He inherited the team near the bottom of the table, with four points from nine matches.

Papas led the Cannons to safety and helped consolidate the club's position in the top tier of football in Victoria. He also led Oakleigh to its first Dockerty Cup final and through the qualifying rounds of the 2015 FFA Cup, where the club defeated opponents from South Australia and Queensland before being eliminated by Hume City in the quarter-finals.

=== Green Gully SC ===
Green Gully SC announced Papas as manager for the 2016 NPL Victoria season. Under Papas, Green Gully defeated A-League side Central Coast Mariners in the Round of 32 of the 2016 FFA Cup, with Liam Boland scoring a long-range winner in stoppage time at Green Gully Reserve.

Green Gully reached the quarter-finals of the FFA Cup before being eliminated by Canberra Olympic FC in the final minute of extra time. The club also returned to finals football in 2016 after a three-season absence and reached the Dockerty Cup final. In 2017, Green Gully again reached the finals. Papas left Green Gully after accepting an opportunity to coach again in Asia.

=== Al Ettifaq Club ===
Papas joined Saudi Professional League club Al Ettifaq Club as an assistant coach during the latter part of the league season. He arrived while the club was involved in a relegation battle, having not won a league match for three months. Al Ettifaq secured its Pro League status with two matches remaining.

Reflecting on the role, Papas said that improving results while finding a playing style suited to the characteristics of the squad was a balancing act. He later described the experience of working in the Saudi Pro League as valuable for his development.

=== Double Pass ===
In 2018, Papas was appointed project manager and football consultant for Belgian-based talent development company Double Pass. In this role, he worked with a group of European coaches consulting to Japanese and United States professional football clubs on talent development structures.

=== Yokohama F. Marinos ===
In January 2019, Papas was appointed assistant coach of J.League side Yokohama F. Marinos, joining Ange Postecoglou and Peter Cklamovski as part of the Australian coaching contingent at the club. Yokohama F. Marinos won the J1 League title in 2019, the club's first championship in 15 years.

Papas was later elevated to head coach under Postecoglou in 2020. Speaking about the role, he described the period as an important learning experience and said he valued working under a coach he respected.

=== Kagoshima United ===
In December 2020, Papas was appointed coach of J3 League side Kagoshima United. He was recruited to oversee a shift in the team's football approach towards a more attacking and possession-based style.

Kagoshima began the season strongly and showed a clear shift in playing identity during his period in charge. Papas departed partway through the season due to personal reasons arising from the impact of COVID-19.

=== Return to Newcastle Jets ===
On 28 June 2021, Papas was appointed manager of A-League team Newcastle Jets. At the time, Newcastle were operating without an owner and continued to face financial uncertainty.

Papas's appointment coincided with a younger squad profile and a more aggressive attacking style. In his first season, Newcastle doubled their number of wins from the previous campaign and reduced the average age of the squad. New signings Daniel Penha and Beka Mikeltadze became important players in the team's attack, and the side was frequently noted for its open, high-energy football, often termed the “Box Office Jets”.

Papas resigned after two seasons, with the club's off-field ownership and financial position still unresolved, and subsequently moved to Buriram United in Thailand.

=== Buriram United ===
On 25 June 2023, Papas was appointed head coach of Thai League team Buriram United FC. He joined close to the start of the season and took control of the first team after the transfer window had closed.

Papas was asked to shift the team's style from a more transitional approach towards a possession-oriented and attacking model. During his period in charge, Buriram won an AFC Champions League group-stage match for the first time in five years defeating Chinese Super League side Zeijiang 4–1 as the team moved towards a more attacking style of play. Prior to his departure, Buriram were five points clear at the top of the league table with 4 games remaining, having recorded nine wins and one draw in their previous ten league matches. During that run, Buriram averaged approximately 2.7 goals per game.

=== Cerezo Osaka ===
On 17 December 2024, Papas was appointed head coach of J1 League team Cerezo Osaka. The role marked his return to Japanese football after previous spells with Yokohama F. Marinos and Kagoshima United.

In his first J1 League match as Cerezo manager, Papas led the team to a 5–2 away win over Gamba Osaka in the Osaka derby. According to Cerezo Osaka's match report, it was the first time Cerezo had scored five goals in an official Osaka derby.

During the 2025 season, Cerezo developed into one of the higher-scoring teams in the J1 League. The club finished the league season with 60 goals, and Cerezo later stated that the team had recorded its highest number of goals since 2017 and had shifted from the fourth-highest average age in the league to the fourth-youngest.

The change in attacking approach and the greater use of younger players coincided with increased attention on several Cerezo players. Forward Sota Kitano joined FC Red Bull Salzburg on a permanent transfer in June 2025 after a strong first half of the season with Cerezo, where his energy, movement and work in possession suited the team's developing style.

Papas was named J1 League Manager of the Month in May 2025.

In 2026, Cerezo competed in the J1 100 Year Vision League. During the regional round, the official J.League standings listed Cerezo second in Group West on 31 points after 18 matches. Hudl StatsBomb later profiled Cerezo players Nelson Ishiwatari and Yumeki Yokoyama as notable young talents in the competition, highlighting Ishiwatari's mobility and defensive activity in midfield, and Yokoyama's ball-carrying after stepping up to J1 level.

Cerezo defeated Nagoya Grampus 6–1 at Yanmar Hanasaka Stadium on 17 May 2026. In the playoff round, Cerezo defeated FC Tokyo 5–3 on aggregate after winning the second leg 3–1 away on 6 June 2026. On 10 June 2026, Cerezo Osaka announced that Papas had won the J1 100 Year Vision League West Division Manager of the Year award.

Papas departed Cerezo Osaka in early July 2026, having managed 66 matches across all competitions.

=== Return to Al Ettifaq ===
On 3 July 2026, Papas was appointed head coach of Saudi Pro League club Al-Ettifaq on a one-year contract, with an option for a further season. He succeeded Saad Al-Shehri, taking over a team that had finished seventh in the previous season. The appointment marked his return to the club where he had previously served as an assistant coach in 2017, and set up a managerial reunion in Saudi Arabia with his former Yokohama F. Marinos colleague Ange Postecoglou, who had recently taken charge of Al-Nassr.

Upon his appointment, Papas stated he felt he had "unfinished business" at Al Ettifaq and aimed to build an ambitious, attacking identity to challenge in the league, King's Cup, and Gulf Cup.

== Managerial style ==
Papas has generally been associated with attacking football and youth development. Newcastle Jets described his approach in 2021 as based on a recognisable style of play, attacking without fear and speed in attack. At Cerezo Osaka, he similarly framed his work around attacking identity and academy development, stating that the club wanted to produce a brand of football that would excite supporters while also bringing more young players into the first team.

== Managerial statistics ==
As of match played 14 September 2026

Managerial record by team and tenure
Team	Nat	From	To	Record				
Team	Nat	From	To	P	W	D	L	Win %
Kagoshima United	(Japan)	1 February 2021	28 May 2021	8	3	2	3	37.50
Newcastle Jets	(Australia)	28 June 2021	30 June 2023	55	17	10	28	30.91
Buriram United	(Thailand)	7 August 2023	21 March 2024	33	20	7	6	60.61
Cerezo Osaka	(Japan)	1 January 2025	3 July 2026	66	32	11	23	48.48
Al-Ettifaq	(Saudi Arabia)	3 July 2026	Present	8	3	2	3	37.50
Career total				170	75	32	63	44.12

== Honours ==
=== As coach ===
Yokohama F. Marinos

- J1 League: 2019

Buriram United

- Thai League 1: 2023–24

=== Individual ===
- J1 League Manager of the Month: May 2025
- J1 100 Year Vision League West Division Manager of the Year: 2026
