= 2024 J1 League =

32nd season of the J1 League

J1 League
- Season: 2024
- Dates: 23 February – 8 December
- Champions: Vissel Kobe; 2nd J1 title 2nd Japanese title
- Relegated: Júbilo Iwata; Hokkaido Consadole Sapporo; Sagan Tosu
- Champions League Elite: Vissel Kobe; Sanfrecce Hiroshima; Machida Zelvia
- Champions League Two: Gamba Osaka
- Matches: 380
- Goals: 1,013 (2.67 per match)
- Top goalscorer: Anderson Lopes (24 goals)
- Biggest home win: Vissel Kobe 6–1 Hokkaido Consadole Sapporo (30 March 2024); Machida Zelvia 5–0 Tokyo Verdy (19 May 2024); Shonan Bellmare 5–0 Júbilo Iwata (14 July 2024)
- Biggest away win: Kyoto Sanga 0–5 Sanfrecce Hiroshima (19 May 2024)
- Highest scoring: Kawasaki Frontale 4–5 Júbilo Iwata (1 March 2024); Tokyo Verdy 4–5 Kawasaki Frontale (30 November 2024)
- Longest winning run: 7 matches Sanfrecce Hiroshima
- Longest unbeaten run: 11 matches Kashima Antlers; Sanfrecce Hiroshima; Tokyo Verdy
- Longest winless run: 12 matches Sagan Tosu
- Longest losing run: 8 matches Hokkaido Consadole Sapporo
- Highest attendance: 57,885; FC Tokyo 2–0 Albirex Niigata (13 July 2024)
- Lowest attendance: 5,240; Machida Zelvia 1–2 Sanfrecce Hiroshima (3 April 2024)
- Total attendance: 7,734,871
- Average attendance: 20,355

The 2024 J1 League, also known as the 2024 Meiji Yasuda J1 League (Japanese: 2024 明治安田J1リーグ, Hepburn: 2024 Meiji Yasuda J1 Rīgu) for sponsorship reasons, was the 32nd season of J1 League, the top Japanese professional league for association football clubs, since its establishment in 1992. This was the tenth season of the league since its rebrand from J.League Division 1.

Vissel Kobe were the defending champions, having won their first ever league title with one match to spare in the previous season. They retained their league title on the last matchday.

== Overview ==
For the first time since 2021, the number of the clubs in the league increased from 18 to 20. At the end of season, three clubs were relegated to the J2 League for the 2025 season, without relegation play-offs between J1 and J2 clubs.

== Changes from the previous season ==
Only one club was relegated to the 2024 J2 League. Due to the re-introduction of 20 clubs league format, Yokohama FC became the sole team going down to the second division, after just one season in the J1 League. They were replaced by three teams promoted from the 2023 J2 League. The first club promoted was Tokyo-based Machida Zelvia, debuting in the J1 as the J2 champions following a seven-year run in the Japanese second tier. Another automatic promotion spot was obtained by Júbilo Iwata, who made a swift comeback after just a single season absence by finishing second, thus marking the return of a team from Shizuoka in the Japanese first division since 2022. The last promotion spot was earned by Tokyo Verdy, returning to the top flight for the first time since 2008 by finishing third in the J2 League and later won the promotion play-offs. This brings back the Tokyo derby between Verdy and FC Tokyo in the J1 for the first time since that season as well as the first season in which three clubs from the capital city are competing at the highest tier of Japanese football system.

== Schedule ==
The league and match format was announced on 19 December 2023. The league began on 23 February and ended on 8 December; it was played in a double round-robin format with 38 fixtures in total.

== Participating clubs ==
Locations of the 2024 J1 League teams
2024 J1 League teams in Keihanshin
2024 J1 League teams in Greater Tokyo Area
Teams in Greater Tokyo Area

Club	Location	Stadium	Capacity
Hokkaido Consadole Sapporo	Hokkaido	Sapporo Dome	38,794
Kashima Antlers	Ibaraki Prefecture	Kashima Soccer Stadium	39,095
Urawa Red Diamonds	Saitama Prefecture	Saitama Stadium 2002	62,040
Kashiwa Reysol	Chiba Prefecture	Sankyo Frontier Kashiwa Stadium	15,109
FC Tokyo	Tokyo	Ajinomoto Stadium	47,851
Tokyo Verdy	Tokyo	Ajinomoto Stadium	47,851
Machida Zelvia	Tokyo	Machida GION Stadium	15,489
Kawasaki Frontale	Kanagawa Prefecture	Uvance Todoroki Stadium by Fujitsu	26,827
Yokohama F. Marinos	Kanagawa Prefecture	Nissan Stadium	71,624
Shonan Bellmare	Kanagawa Prefecture	Lemon Gas Stadium Hiratsuka	15,380
Albirex Niigata	Niigata Prefecture	Denka Big Swan Stadium	41,684
Júbilo Iwata	Shizuoka Prefecture	Yamaha Stadium	15,156
Nagoya Grampus	Aichi Prefecture	Toyota Stadium	42,753
Kyoto Sanga	Kyoto Prefecture	Sanga Stadium by Kyocera	21,623
Gamba Osaka	Osaka Prefecture	Panasonic Stadium Suita	39,694
Cerezo Osaka	Osaka Prefecture	Yodoko Sakura Stadium	24,481
Vissel Kobe	Hyōgo Prefecture	Noevir Stadium Kobe	29,643
Sanfrecce Hiroshima	Hiroshima Prefecture	Edion Peace Wing Hiroshima	28,347
Avispa Fukuoka	Fukuoka Prefecture	Best Denki Stadium	21,562
Sagan Tosu	Saga Prefecture	Ekimae Real Estate Stadium	20,805

=== Personnel and kits ===
Club	Manager	Captain	Kit manufacturer	Main shirt sponsor
Albirex Niigata	(Japan) Rikizo Matsuhashi	(Japan) Yuto Horigome	(Germany) Adidas	Kameda Seika
Avispa Fukuoka	(Japan) Shigetoshi Hasebe	(Japan) Tatsuki Nara	(Japan) Yonex	Shin Nihon Seiyaku
Cerezo Osaka	(Japan) Akio Kogiku	(Japan) Tatsuya Yamashita	(Germany) Puma	Yanmar
FC Tokyo	(Australia) Peter Cklamovski	(Japan) Masato Morishige	(United States) New Balance	Tokyo Gas
Gamba Osaka	(Spain) Dani Poyatos	(Japan) Takashi Usami	(Denmark) Hummel	Panasonic
Hokkaido Consadole Sapporo	(Serbia) Mihailo Petrović	(Japan) Takuma Arano	(Japan) Mizuno	Ishiya
Júbilo Iwata	(Japan) Akinobu Yokouchi	(Japan) Hiroki Yamada	(England) Admiral	Yamaha
Kashima Antlers	(Japan) Masaki Chugo	(Japan) Gaku Shibasaki	(United States) Nike	LIXIL
Kashiwa Reysol	(Japan) Masami Ihara	(Japan) Taiyo Koga	(Japan) Yonex	Hitachi
Kawasaki Frontale	(Japan) Toru Oniki	(Japan) Yasuto Wakizaka	(Germany) Puma	Fujitsu
Kyoto Sanga	(South Korea) Cho Kwi-jae	(Japan) Temma Matsuda	(Germany) Puma	Kyocera
Machida Zelvia	(Japan) Go Kuroda	(Japan) Gen Shoji	(Germany) Adidas	CyberAgent
Nagoya Grampus	(Japan) Kenta Hasegawa	(Japan) Sho Inagaki	(Japan) Mizuno	Toyota
Sagan Tosu	(Japan) Kosuke Kitani	(Japan) Naoyuki Fujita	(United States) New Balance	Kimura Information Technology
Sanfrecce Hiroshima	(Germany) Michael Skibbe	(Japan) Sho Sasaki	(United States) Nike	EDION
Shonan Bellmare	(Japan) Satoshi Yamaguchi	(South Korea) Kim Min-tae	(Brazil) Penalty	Meldia
Tokyo Verdy	(Japan) Hiroshi Jofuku	(Japan) Koki Morita	(Brazil) Athleta	Nicigas
Urawa Red Diamonds	(Poland) Maciej Skorża	(Japan) Shusaku Nishikawa	(United States) Nike	Polus; Mitsubishi Heavy Industries
Vissel Kobe	(Japan) Takayuki Yoshida	(Japan) Hotaru Yamaguchi	(Japan) Asics	Rakuten Mobile
Yokohama F. Marinos	(Malta) John Hutchinson (interim)	(Japan) Takuya Kida	(Germany) Adidas	Nissan

=== Managerial changes ===
Team	Outgoing manager	Manner of departure	Date of vacancy	Position in the table	Incoming manager	Date of appointment
Kashima Antlers	(Japan) Daiki Iwamasa	End of contract	4 December 2023	Pre-season	(Serbia) Ranko Popović	21 December 2023
Yokohama F. Marinos	(Australia) Kevin Muscat	Resigned	6 December 2023	Pre-season	(Australia) Harry Kewell	31 December 2023
Urawa Red Diamonds	(Poland) Maciej Skorża	Resigned	23 December 2023	Pre-season	(Norway) Per-Mathias Høgmo	23 December 2023
Yokohama F. Marinos	(Australia) Harry Kewell	Sacked	16 July 2024	12th	(Malta) John Hutchinson (interim)	16 July 2024
Sagan Tosu	(Japan) Kenta Kawai	Sacked	9 August 2024	19th	(Japan) Kosuke Kitani	9 August 2024
Urawa Red Diamonds	(Norway) Per-Mathias Høgmo	Sacked	26 August 2024	13th	(Japan) Nobuyasu Ikeda (interim)	27 August 2024
Urawa Red Diamonds	(Japan) Nobuyasu Ikeda (interim)	End of interim spell	1 September 2024	12th	(Poland) Maciej Skorża	1 September 2024
Kashima Antlers	(Serbia) Ranko Popović	Sacked	6 October 2024	4th	(Japan) Masaki Chugo	9 October 2024

=== Foreign players ===
From the 2021 season, there are no limitations on signing foreign players, but clubs can only register up to five of them for a single matchday squad. Players from J.League partner nations (Thailand, Vietnam, Morocco, Malaysia, Cambodia, Singapore, Indonesia) were exempted from these restrictions.

- Players name in **bold** indicates the player is registered during the mid-season transfer window.
- Player's name in italics indicates the player has Japanese nationality in addition to their FIFA nationality, holds the nationality of a J.League partner nation, or is exempt from being treated as a foreign player due to having been born in Japan and being enrolled in, or having graduated from an approved type of school in the country.

Club	Player 1	Player 2	Player 3	Player 4	Player 5	Player 6	Player 7	Player 8	Former player (s)
Albirex Niigata	(Australia) Thomas Deng	(Brazil) Danilo Gomes	(New Zealand) Michael Fitzgerald						
Avispa Fukuoka	(Brazil) Douglas Grolli	(Brazil) Wellington	(Iran) Shahab Zahedi	(Switzerland) Nassim Ben Khalifa					
Cerezo Osaka	(Brazil) Capixaba	(Brazil) Léo Ceará	(Brazil) Lucas Fernandes	(Brazil) Vitor Bueno	(South Korea) Kim Jin-hyeon	(South Korea) Yang Han-been			(Belgium) Jordy Croux (Indonesia) Justin Hubner
FC Tokyo	(Brazil) Diego Oliveira	(Brazil) **Everton Galdino**	(Brazil) Henrique Trevisan						(Brazil) Jajá Silva
Gamba Osaka	(Brazil) Dawhan	(Brazil) Juan Alano	(Brazil) Welton	(China) Zhang Aolin	(Israel) Neta Lavi	(Tunisia) Issam Jebali			
Hokkaido Consadole Sapporo	(Ghana) **Francis Cann**	(Ghana) **Kinglord Safo**	(Sierra Leone) **Amadou Bakayoko**	(South Korea) Kim Gun-hee	(South Korea) **Park Min-gyu**	(Spain) **Jordi Sánchez**	(Thailand) Supachok Sarachat		
Júbilo Iwata	(Belgium) **Jordy Croux**	(Brazil) Bruno José	(Brazil) Léo Gomes	(Brazil) Matheus Peixoto	(Brazil) Ricardo Graça	(Brazil) Weverton	(Israel) **Hassan Hilu**	(South Korea) Park Se-gi	
Kashima Antlers	(Brazil) Guilherme Parede	(Brazil) **Talles**	(Serbia) Aleksandar Čavrić	(Serbia) Radomir Milosavljević	(South Korea) Park Eui-jeong				
Kashiwa Reysol	(Brazil) Diego	(Brazil) Matheus Sávio	(Netherlands) Jay-Roy Grot						
Kawasaki Frontale	(Brazil) Erison	(Brazil) Jesiel	(Brazil) Marcinho	(Brazil) Patrick Verhon	(Brazil) Zé Ricardo	(Colombia) **César Haydar**	(South Korea) Jung Sung-ryong		(France) Bafétimbi Gomis
Kyoto Sanga	(Brazil) **Lucas Oliveira**	(Brazil) Marco Túlio	(Brazil) **Murilo Costa**	(Brazil) **Rafael Elias**	(South Korea) Gu Sung-yun	(South Korea) **Yoon Sung-jun**			(Suriname) Warner Hahn
Machida Zelvia	(Australia) Mitch Duke	(Brazil) Erik	(Chile) Byron Vásquez	(Kosovo) Ibrahim Drešević	(South Korea) Jang Min-gyu	(South Korea) Na Sang-ho	(South Korea) Oh Se-hun	(United States) Anton Burns	
Nagoya Grampus	(Australia) Mitchell Langerak	(Brazil) Patric	(Denmark) Kasper Junker	(Ecuador) **José Carabalí**	(South Korea) Ha Chang-rae	(Togo) **Yves Avelete**			(Brazil) Thales
Sagan Tosu	(Brazil) **Jajá Silva**	(Brazil) Marcelo Ryan	(Brazil) Vinícius Araújo	(Lithuania) **Vykintas Slivka**	(South Korea) Kim Tae-hyeon	(South Korea) Lee Yoon-sung	(South Korea) Park Il-gyu	(Spain) Arnau Riera	
Sanfrecce Hiroshima	(Brazil) Douglas Vieira	(Brazil) Ezequiel	(Brazil) Marcos Júnior	(Cyprus) Pieros Sotiriou	(Germany) **Tolgay Arslan**	(Portugal) **Gonçalo Paciência**			
Shonan Bellmare	(Brazil) **Luiz Phellype**	(Brazil) Lukian	(South Korea) Kim Min-tae	(South Korea) Song Bum-keun					
Tokyo Verdy	(Brazil) Matheus Vidotto	(Portugal) Tiago Alves							
Urawa Red Diamonds	(Brazil) Thiago Santana	(Netherlands) Bryan Linssen	(Norway) Marius Høibråten	(Sweden) Samuel Gustafson	(Thailand) Ekanit Panya				(Denmark) Alexander Scholz (Norway) Ola Solbakken
Vissel Kobe	(Brazil) Jean Patric	(Brazil) Matheus Thuler							
Yokohama F. Marinos	(Brazil) Anderson Lopes	(Brazil) Eduardo	(Brazil) Élber	(Brazil) Yan Matheus	(Togo) **Kodjo Aziangbe**				(South Korea) Nam Tae-hee

== League table ==
Pos	Team	Pld	W	D	L	GF	GA	GD	Pts	Qualification or relegation
1	Vissel Kobe (C)	38	21	9	8	61	36	+25	72	Qualification for the AFC Champions League Elite league stage (Note: Since the winners of the 2024 Emperor's Cup, Vissel Kobe, had already qualified for the Champions League Elite, the spot given to the Emperor's Cup winners (Champions League Elite) was passed to the third-placed team. Consequently, the spot given to the third-placed team (Champions League Two) was passed to the fourth-placed team.)
2	Sanfrecce Hiroshima	38	19	11	8	72	43	+29	68	Qualification for the AFC Champions League Elite league stage
3	Machida Zelvia	38	19	9	10	54	34	+20	66	Qualification for the AFC Champions League Elite league stage
4	Gamba Osaka	38	18	12	8	49	35	+14	66	Qualification for the AFC Champions League Two group stage
5	Kashima Antlers	38	18	11	9	60	41	+19	65	
6	Tokyo Verdy	38	14	14	10	51	51	0	56	
7	FC Tokyo	38	15	9	14	53	51	+2	54	
8	Kawasaki Frontale	38	13	13	12	66	57	+9	52	
9	Yokohama F. Marinos	38	15	7	16	61	62	−1	52	
10	Cerezo Osaka	38	13	13	12	43	48	−5	52	
11	Nagoya Grampus	38	15	5	18	44	47	−3	50	
12	Avispa Fukuoka	38	12	14	12	33	38	−5	50	
13	Urawa Red Diamonds	38	12	12	14	49	45	+4	48	
14	Kyoto Sanga	38	12	11	15	43	55	−12	47	
15	Shonan Bellmare	38	12	9	17	53	58	−5	45	
16	Albirex Niigata	38	10	12	16	44	59	−15	42	
17	Kashiwa Reysol	38	9	14	15	39	51	−12	41	
18	Júbilo Iwata (R)	38	10	8	20	47	68	−21	38	Relegation to the J2 League
19	Hokkaido Consadole Sapporo (R)	38	9	10	19	43	66	−23	37	Relegation to the J2 League
20	Sagan Tosu (R)	38	10	5	23	48	68	−20	35	Relegation to the J2 League

Source: JLeague.co, JLeague.jp, J.League Data Site
Rules for classification: 1) Points; 2) Goal difference; 3) Goals scored; 4) Head-to-head points; 5) Head-to-head goal difference; 6) Head-to-head goals scored; 7) Fewer disciplinary points.
(C) Champions; (R) Relegated

== Results ==
Home \ Away	ANI	AFU	COS	GOS	HCS	JIW	KSA	KSR	KWF	KYS	MCZ	NGR	STO	SHI	SHB	TOK	TOV	URD	VKO	YFM
Albirex Niigata	—	1–2	0–1	0–1	1–1	2–2	0–4	1–1	2–2	2–0	0–0	1–0	3–4	1–1	3–1	1–3	0–2	2–4	2–3	3–1
Avispa Fukuoka	0–1	—	0–3	1–0	0–0	2–2	1–0	2–1	1–1	1–2	0–3	1–0	2–0	1–1	1–1	1–3	0–1	1–0	0–2	2–1
Cerezo Osaka	1–2	1–0	—	1–0	1–1	1–2	0–2	0–0	1–0	3–5	0–0	2–1	1–0	1–1	2–0	2–2	2–1	2–1	1–4	2–2
Gamba Osaka	1–0	2–2	1–0	—	2–1	2–1	1–2	2–1	3–1	0–0	1–3	3–2	2–1	3–1	0–1	0–0	1–1	0–1	2–1	4–0
Hokkaido Consadole Sapporo	0–1	2–2	1–1	1–0	—	1–0	0–3	1–0	2–0	2–0	1–2	1–2	5–3	1–1	3–3	1–2	0–2	0–1	1–1	0–1
Júbilo Iwata	2–0	0–0	1–1	3–4	0–2	—	2–1	0–1	2–2	1–2	2–0	0–1	0–3	1–2	3–2	2–1	3–0	1–1	0–2	3–4
Kashima Antlers	1–1	0–0	1–1	0–0	2–0	1–0	—	0–0	2–1	1–0	3–1	0–0	3–0	2–2	3–1	2–1	3–3	0–0	1–0	3–2
Kashiwa Reysol	1–1	0–2	1–1	0–0	2–1	0–2	1–2	—	2–3	1–1	1–1	0–2	1–1	0–1	2–1	3–2	2–3	1–0	1–1	1–0
Kawasaki Frontale	5–1	3–1	1–1	1–1	3–0	4–5	1–3	1–1	—	0–1	0–1	2–1	3–2	1–1	1–1	3–0	0–0	3–1	3–0	1–3
Kyoto Sanga	0–1	2–3	1–1	2–2	2–0	0–3	0–0	2–2	1–1	—	0–3	3–2	2–0	0–5	1–2	3–0	0–0	0–0	2–3	2–3
Machida Zelvia	1–3	0–0	2–1	1–1	0–0	4–0	1–0	2–0	1–4	1–0	—	1–0	3–1	1–2	0–1	3–0	5–0	2–2	1–2	1–2
Nagoya Grampus	3–0	0–0	2–1	0–1	0–2	2–0	0–3	2–1	2–0	1–1	0–1	—	0–3	1–2	1–1	3–1	1–0	0–1	0–2	2–1
Sagan Tosu	1–2	0–0	0–2	0–2	4–0	3–0	4–2	1–4	5–2	3–0	2–1	0–2	—	1–4	1–2	0–1	0–2	1–1	0–0	1–2
Sanfrecce Hiroshima	1–1	1–0	2–0	1–1	5–1	2–0	1–3	2–0	2–2	0–1	2–0	2–3	4–0	—	2–0	3–2	4–1	2–0	1–3	6–2
Shonan Bellmare	2–1	1–1	1–2	1–2	1–1	5–0	3–2	1–2	1–2	0–1	0–0	0–1	2–1	2–1	—	0–1	1–2	4–4	0–1	2–3
FC Tokyo	2–0	0–1	3–0	0–1	1–0	1–1	2–0	3–3	0–3	2–1	1–2	4–1	1–1	1–1	0–2	—	0–0	2–1	1–2	1–1
Tokyo Verdy	2–2	0–0	1–1	0–0	5–3	3–2	2–1	1–1	4–5	2–2	0–1	1–0	2–0	0–2	0–2	2–2	—	2–1	1–1	1–2
Urawa Red Diamonds	0–0	2–1	0–1	0–1	3–4	3–0	2–2	1–0	1–1	3–0	1–2	2–1	3–0	3–0	2–3	0–2	1–1	—	1–1	2–1
Vissel Kobe	3–2	1–0	2–1	2–2	6–1	2–0	3–1	0–1	1–0	0–1	0–0	3–3	2–0	0–0	3–0	0–2	0–1	1–0	—	1–2
Yokohama F. Marinos	0–0	0–1	4–0	2–0	3–2	1–1	4–1	4–0	0–0	1–2	1–3	0–2	0–1	3–2	2–2	1–3	1–2	0–0	1–2	—

Source: J1 League
Legend: Blue = home team win; Yellow = draw; Red = away team win.

== Season statistics ==
=== Top scorers ===
Rank	Player	Club	Goals
1	(Brazil) Anderson Lopes	Yokohama F. Marinos	24
2	(Brazil) Léo Ceará	Cerezo Osaka	21
3	(Japan) Ryo Germain	Júbilo Iwata	19
3	(Japan) Shin Yamada	Kawasaki Frontale	19
5	(Japan) Yuma Suzuki	Kashima Antlers	15
6	(Brazil) Marcelo Ryan	Sagan Tosu	14
7	(Japan) Yoshinori Muto	Vissel Kobe	13
8	(Brazil) Thiago Santana	Urawa Red Diamonds	12
8	(Japan) Takashi Usami	Gamba Osaka	12
10	(Brazil) Lukian	Shonan Bellmare	11
10	(Brazil) Rafael Elias	Kyoto Sanga	11
10	(Japan) Taisei Miyashiro	Vissel Kobe	11
10	(Japan) Yuki Ohashi	Sanfrecce Hiroshima	11
10	(Japan) Yuya Osako	Vissel Kobe	11

=== Hat-tricks ===
Player	For	Against	Result	Date	Ref.
(Japan) Ryo Germain^{4}	Júbilo Iwata	Kawasaki Frontale	5–4 (A)	1 March 2024	
(France) Bafétimbi Gomis	Kawasaki Frontale	Hokkaido Consadole Sapporo	3–0 (H)	11 May 2024	
(Denmark) Kasper Junker	Nagoya Grampus	FC Tokyo	3–1 (H)	15 May 2024	
(Japan) Naoto Arai	Sanfrecce Hiroshima	Kyoto Sanga	5–0 (A)	19 May 2024	
(Brazil) Anderson Lopes	Yokohama F. Marinos	Kashiwa Reysol	4–0 (H)	29 May 2024	
(Brazil) Lukian	Shonan Bellmare	Júbilo Iwata	5–0 (H)	14 July 2024	
(Brazil) Rafael Elias	Kyoto Sanga	Cerezo Osaka	5–3 (A)	17 August 2024	
(Germany) Tolgay Arslan	Sanfrecce Hiroshima	FC Tokyo	3–2 (H)	31 August 2024	
(Brazil) Anderson Lopes	Yokohama F. Marinos	Júbilo Iwata	4–3 (H)	16 November 2024	
(Japan) Hiroto Taniguchi	Tokyo Verdy	Kawasaki Frontale	4–5 (H)	30 November 2024	
(Japan) Shin Yamada	Kawasaki Frontale	Tokyo Verdy	5–4 (A)	30 November 2024	

Notes

- ^{4} Player scored 4 goals
- (H) – Home team
- (A) – Away team

== Awards ==
=== Monthly awards ===
Month	Manager of the Month		Monthly MVP		Goal of the Month		Young Player of the Month		References
Month	Manager	Club	Player	Club	Player	Club	Player	Club	References
February/March	(Japan) Go Kuroda	Machida Zelvia	(Japan) Yu Hirakawa	Machida Zelvia	(Japan) Kaito Taniguchi	Albirex Niigata	(Japan) Akito Suzuki	Shonan Bellmare	
April	(Japan) Akio Kogiku	Cerezo Osaka	(Japan) Ryo Germain	Júbilo Iwata	(Brazil) Thiago Santana	Urawa Red Diamonds	(Japan) Isa Sakamoto	Gamba Osaka	
May	(Serbia) Ranko Popović	Kashima Antlers	(Japan) Yuma Suzuki	Kashima Antlers	(Japan) Tomoya Inukai	Kashiwa Reysol	(Japan) Kota Tawaratsumida	FC Tokyo	
June	(Japan) Shigetoshi Hasebe	Avispa Fukuoka	(Japan) Takashi Usami	Gamba Osaka	(Japan) Yosuke Furukawa	Júbilo Iwata	(Japan) Yosuke Furukawa	Júbilo Iwata	
July	(Japan) Satoshi Yamaguchi	Shonan Bellmare	(Brazil) Lukian	Shonan Bellmare	(Japan) Sho Inagaki	Nagoya Grampus	(Japan) Ayumu Yokoyama	Sagan Tosu	
August	(South Korea) Cho Kwi-jae	Kyoto Sanga	(Brazil) Rafael Elias	Kyoto Sanga	(Japan) Eiji Miyamoto	Albirex Niigata	(Japan) Kota Takai	Kawasaki Frontale	
September	(Germany) Michael Skibbe	Sanfrecce Hiroshima	(Japan) Kensuke Nagai	Nagoya Grampus	(Japan) Homare Tokuda	Kashima Antlers	(Japan) Akito Suzuki	Shonan Bellmare	
October	(Japan) Satoshi Yamaguchi	Shonan Bellmare	(Japan) Takashi Usami	Gamba Osaka	(Japan) Takashi Usami	Gamba Osaka	(Japan) Junnosuke Suzuki	Shonan Bellmare	
November/December	(Japan) Kosuke Kitani	Sagan Tosu	(Japan) Yoshinori Muto	Vissel Kobe	(Japan) Yuma Suzuki	Kashima Antlers	(Japan) Isa Sakamoto	Gamba Osaka	

=== Annual awards ===
Award	Winner	Club
Manager of the Year	(Germany) Michael Skibbe	Sanfrecce Hiroshima
Player of the Year	(Japan) Yoshinori Muto	Vissel Kobe
Best Young Player	(Japan) Kota Takai	Kawasaki Frontale
Goal of the Year	(Japan) Takashi Usami	Gamba Osaka

Best XI
Goalkeeper	(Japan) Keisuke Osako (Sanfrecce Hiroshima)				
Defenders	(Japan) Kimito Nono (Kashima Antlers)	(Japan) Shinnosuke Nakatani (Gamba Osaka)	(Brazil) Matheus Thuler (Vissel Kobe)	(Japan) Sho Sasaki (Sanfrecce Hiroshima)	
Midfielders	(Brazil) Matheus Sávio (Kashiwa Reysol)		(Japan) Kei Chinen (Kashima Antlers)		
Forwards	(Japan) Takashi Usami (Gamba Osaka)	(Brazil) Anderson Lopes (Yokohama F. Marinos)	(Japan) Yuya Osako (Vissel Kobe)		(Japan) Yoshinori Muto (Vissel Kobe)

== See also ==
- 2024 Japanese Super Cup
- 2024 Emperor's Cup
- 2024 J.League Cup
- 2024 J2 League
- 2024 J3 League
- 2024 Japan Football League
- 2024 Japanese Regional Leagues
