= 2026–27 J2 League =

Japanese association football season

J2 League
- Season: 2026–27
- Dates: 8 August 2026 – May 2027
- Matches: 180
- Goals: 465 (2.58 per match)
- Top goalscorer: Koji Okumura (9 goals)
- Biggest home win: Tochigi City 5–0 Vanraure Hachinohe (15 August 2026); Yokohama FC 5–0 Albirex Niigata (6 September 2026); Iwaki FC 5–0 Ventforet Kofu (18 October 2026)
- Biggest away win: Oita Trinita 1–6 Tochigi City (14 November 2026)
- Highest scoring: Oita Trinita 1–6 Tochigi City (14 November 2026)
- Longest winning run: Hokkaido Consadole Sapporo and Tegevajaro Miyazaki (6 games)
- Longest unbeaten run: Tegevajaro Miyazaki (14 games)
- Longest winless run: Fujieda MYFC (12 games)
- Longest losing run: Ventforet Kofu (5 games)
- Highest attendance: 53,973; Yokohama FC 3–1 Júbilo Iwata (16 August 2026)
- Lowest attendance: 1,531; Blaublitz Akita 2–1 Oita Trinita (7 November 2026)
- Total attendance: 1,479,445
- Average attendance: 8,219
- All statistics correct as of 22 November 2026.

The 2026–27 J2 League, also known as the 2026/27 Meiji Yasuda J2 League (Japanese: 2026/27シーズン 明治安田J2リーグ, Hepburn: 2026/27 Shīzun Meiji Yasuda J2 Rīgu) for sponsorship reasons, is the 28th season of the J2 League, the second-tier Japanese professional league for association football clubs, since its establishment in 1999. This is also the twelfth season of the league since its rebrand from J.League Division 2.

== Overview ==
=== General ===
This marked the first J2 League season scheduled with a summer-to-spring format with 20 teams will compete in the league – the fourteen teams from the previous season, three teams relegated from the J1 League and three teams promoted from J3 League.

=== Teams relegated from J1 League ===
Yokohama F. Marinos' victory over Sanfrecce Hiroshima saw Albirex Niigata become the first team to be relegated on 25 October 2025. Albirex Niigata returned to J2 after spending three seasons in the top division.

Shonan Bellmare became the second team to be relegated after losing to Avispa Fukuoka on 26 October 2025, as Shonan Bellmare returned to J2 after spending eight seasons in the top division.

Yokohama FC became the final team to be relegated after losing to Kashima Antlers on 8 November 2025, followed by Yokohama F. Marinos' victory over Kyoto Sanga the following day. Both results returned Yokohama FC to J2 after spending a season in the top division.

=== Teams promoted to J1 League ===
Mito HollyHock and V-Varen Nagasaki became the first two teams to be promoted on 29 November 2025. In the final matchweek, Mito HollyHock defeated Oita Trinita while V-Varen Nagasaki held Tokushima Vortis to a draw. This result ended a 25-season stay in J2 for Mito HollyHock and seven-seasons stay for V-Varen Nagasaki.

The final promotion spot to J1 was secured by JEF United Chiba by defeating Tokushima Vortis in the final round of the promotion playoffs on 13 December 2025. This result saw them return to J1 after 17 seasons in the second division.

=== Teams promoted from J3 League ===
Tochigi City became the first team to be promoted on 23 November 2025 after defeating Nagano Parceiro in matchweek 37. This result made it their second consecutive promotion after previously being promoted from JFL to J3. Vanraure Hachinohe became the second team to be promoted by holding Ryukyu Okinawa to a draw in the final matchweek on 29 November 2025. The last promotion slot secured by Tegevajaro Miyazaki after defeating FC Osaka in the final round of the promotion playoff on 14 December 2025.

The three promoted teams will compete in J2 for the first time in their respective history.

=== Teams relegated to J3 League ===
Ehime FC became the first team to be relegated on 26 October 2025 after being defeated by Júbilo Iwata in matchweek 34 and that result ended their time in J2 for two seasons.

Kataller Toyama's victory over Blaublitz Akita in the final matchweek on 29 November 2025, resulted in the relegation of Renofa Yamaguchi and Roasso Kumamoto. Renofa Yamaguchi were relegated after spending nine seasons in J2 despite a win over RB Omiya Ardija, while Roasso Kumamoto were held to a goalless draw by Ventforet Kofu resulted in their relegation after spending four seasons in J2.

== Teams ==
=== Team changes ===
The following teams changed division since the 2025 season.

To J2 League
▼ Relegated from J1 League
- Yokohama FC
- Shonan Bellmare
- Albirex Niigata
▲ Promoted from J3 League
- Tochigi City
- Vanraure Hachinohe
- Tegevajaro Miyazaki

From J2 League
▲ Promoted to J1 League
- Mito HollyHock
- V-Varen Nagasaki
- JEF United Chiba
▼ Relegated to J3 League
- Renofa Yamaguchi
- Roasso Kumamoto
- Ehime FC

=== Location and stadium ===
Locations of teams in the 2026–27 J2 League.

Team	Location	Stadium	Capacity	2025 season	License
Albirex Niigata^{↓}	Niigata	Denka Big Swan Stadium	41,684	20th in J1	J1
Blaublitz Akita	Akita	Soyu Stadium	18,560	14th in J2	J1
FC Imabari	Imabari	ASICS Satoyama Stadium	5,316	11th in J2	J1
Fujieda MYFC	Fujieda	Fujieda Soccer Stadium	10,057	15th in J2	J1
Hokkaido Consadole Sapporo	Sapporo	Sapporo Dome	38,794	12th in J2	J1
Iwaki FC	Iwaki	Hawaiians Stadium Iwaki	5,066	9th in J2	J1
Júbilo Iwata	Iwata	Yamaha Stadium	15,156	5th in J2	J1
Kataller Toyama	Toyama	Toyama Athletic Stadium	18,588	17th in J2	J1
Montedio Yamagata	Tendō	ND Soft Stadium	20,638	10th in J2	J1
Oita Trinita	Ōita	Crasus Dome Oita	31,997	16th in J2	J1
RB Omiya Ardija	Saitama	NACK5 Stadium Omiya	15,491	6th in J2	J1
Sagan Tosu	Tosu	Ekimae Real Estate Stadium	20,805	8th in J2	J1
Shonan Bellmare^{↓}	Hiratsuka	Lemon Gas Stadium Hiratsuka	15,380	19th in J1	J1
Tegevajaro Miyazaki^{↑}	Shintomi	Ichigo Miyazaki Shintomi Football Stadium	5,354	4th in J3	J2
Tochigi City^{↑}	Tochigi	City Football Station	5,129	1st in J3	J2
Tokushima Vortis	Naruto	Pocari Sweat Stadium	17,924	4th in J2	J1
Vanraure Hachinohe^{↑}	Hachinohe	Prifoods Stadium	5,124	2nd in J3	J2
Vegalta Sendai	Sendai	Yurtec Stadium Sendai	19,694	7th in J2	J1
Ventforet Kofu	Kōfu	JIT Recycle Ink Stadium	15,853	13th in J2	J1
Yokohama FC^{↓}	Yokohama	NHK Spring Mitsuzawa Football Stadium	15,454	18th in J1	J1

^{↓}	Relegated from the J1 League
^{↑}	Promoted from the J3 League

=== Personnel and kits ===
Note: Flags indicate national team as has been defined under FIFA eligibility rules. Players and coaches may hold more than one non-FIFA nationality.

Team	Manager	Captain	Kit manufacturer	Kit sponsors	
Team	Manager	Captain	Kit manufacturer	Main	Other(s)
Albirex Niigata	(Japan) Yuzo Funakoshi	(New Zealand) Michael Fitzgerald	(Germany) Adidas	Kameda Seika	List: Front: NSG Group, Oisix; Back: Komeri, Niigata Nippo; Sleeves: NAMICS Corporation; Shorts: None
Blaublitz Akita	(Japan) Ken Yoshida	(Japan) Hiroto Morooka	(Brazil) Athleta	TDK	List: Front: Akita Sakigake Shimpō, Akita Komachi; Back: Traffic RentalxLease, A2Care; Sleeves: TSA Group, Akita City, Akita Prefecture; Shorts: ADK
FC Imabari	(Japan) Yoshikiyo Kuboyama	(Japan) Taiga Son, (Japan) Yuki Kajiura, (Japan) Takafumi Yamada, (Brazil) Edigar Junio, (Japan) Yoshiaki Komai	(Japan) Asics	Unicharm	List: Front: Reproduction Clinic Osaka, Mitsubishi Corporation, Nova Marine Carriers, Ultrabulk; Back: Imabari Shipbuilding, Xymax; Sleeves: Imabari; Shorts: None
Fujieda MYFC	(Japan) Tomoaki Makino	(Japan) Keita Matsuda	(Japan) Gol.	Touzai (H) / Fujifilm (A)	List: Front: Shimada Kakegawa Shinkin Bank, Sakai Industry, SIC Group; Back: None; Sleeves: Kakumaru Construction, Fujieda, Yaizu, Shimada, Makinohara, Yoshida, Kawane; Shorts: None
Hokkaido Consadole Sapporo	(Japan) Kenta Kawai	(Japan) Shota Nishino	(Japan) Mizuno	Shiroi Koibito (H) / Ishiya (A)	List: Front: Katagiri, A.I.PLAN, Hokuden; Back: None; Sleeves: Graphic Holdings, Hokkaido; Shorts: None
Iwaki FC	(Japan) Kazuaki Tasaka	(Japan) Ryota Nagaki	(United States) Under Armour	BHC	List: Front: Starts, Showa Astec, Okamoto; Back: Alps Alpine; Sleeves: Iwaki; Shorts: None
Júbilo Iwata	(Japan) Tadahiro Akiba	(Japan) Kensuke Fujiwara	(England) Admiral	Yamaha	List: Front: Kurabe; Back: None; Sleeves: Hamamatsu Photonics; Shorts: None
Kataller Toyama	(Japan) Ryo Adachi	(Japan) Tsubasa Yoshihira	(Japan) Goldwin	YKK AP	List: Front: Kenko Group, Shoei Group; Back: Hokuriku Electric Power Company, Hokuriku Electric Industry; Sleeves: Izak, Toyama; Shorts: None
Montedio Yamagata	(Japan) Akinobu Yokouchi	(Japan) Shoma Doi	(Brazil) Penalty	ABeam	List: Front: Yamagata Nissan Group; Back: None; Sleeves: Yamagata; Shorts: None
Oita Trinita	(Japan) Shuhei Yomoda	(Japan) Keigo Sakakibara	(Germany) Puma	Oita Bank	List: Front: Crasus Chemical, TKP, Daihatsu Kyushu; Back: Shiraishi; Sleeves: SkyDeck, Oita; Shorts: None
RB Omiya Ardija	(Spain) Narcís Pèlach	(Brazil) Gabriel	(Germany) Adidas	Red Bull	List: Front: NTT East; Back: Red Bull; Sleeves: Volkswagen, Saitama; Shorts: None
Sagan Tosu	(Japan) Akio Kogiku	(Japan) Kenta Nishizawa	(United States) New Balance	Kimura Information Technology	List: Front: X-Mobile, Saga SSP, Asahi I&R, Mest; Back: Best Amenity, Animal One; Sleeves: 7Force, Tosu; Shorts: None
Shonan Bellmare	(Japan) Tetsu Nagasawa	(Japan) Kazuki Dohana	(England) Umbro	Fujita	List: Front: Authsense, Amada; Back: Sanno University; Sleeves: Shōnan; Shorts: None
Tegevajaro Miyazaki	(Japan) Yuji Okuma	(Japan) Koji Okumura	(Japan) ZOZO	Ichigo	List: Front: Matsumoto Holdings, BTV Miyazaki, Miyazaki Weight Machine, The Miyanichi; Back: Ichigo, Ooyodo Kaihatsu; Sleeves: Miyazaki Toyota, Miyazaki; Shorts: None
Tochigi City	(Japan) Naoki Imaya	(Japan) Ryo Okui	(Japan) Luxperior	Nippon Rika	List: Front: None; Back: Fukai MFG; Sleeves: Tochigi, Ashikaga; Shorts: None
Tokushima Vortis	(Japan) Takafumi Yoshimoto	(Japan) Ken Iwao	(Japan) Mizuno	Pocari Sweat	List: Front: Work Staff, BODYMAINTÉ; Back: None; Sleeves: Earth Corporation, Tokushima; Shorts: None
Vanraure Hachinohe	(Japan) Keiji Kuraishi	(Japan) Shoma Takayoshi	(Denmark) Hummel	Atmix	List: Front: Home Center SUNDAY, Daiko; Back: Prifoods, Miit Solution; Sleeves: Daily Tohoku; Shorts: Miyago Group
Vegalta Sendai	(Japan) Yoshiro Moriyama	(Japan) Masahiro Sugata	(Germany) Adidas	Iris Ohyama	List: Front: Daishin, SBI Securities; Back: None; Sleeves: Sendai; Shorts: Mynavi
Ventforet Kofu	(Japan) Hiroki Shibuya	(Japan) Miki Inoue	(Japan) Mizuno	Hakubaku	List: Front: YSK e-com, Nihon Network Service; Back: Yamanashi Chuo Bank, Kyokuyo; Sleeves: Kusuri no Sunroad, Yamanashi; Shorts: Maruai
Yokohama FC	(Japan) Daisuke Sudo	(Japan) Katsuya Iwatake	(Germany) Puma	Onodera Group	List: Front: Yokorei, Fudeal Creation; Back: Frontier Direct, Japan Elevator Service; Sleeves: S-Dental Group, Yokohama; Shorts: None

=== Managerial changes ===
==== Post 100 Year Vision ====
Team	Outgoing manager	Manner	Date of vacancy	Replaced by	Date of arrival
Vanraure Hachinohe	Yuki Takahashi	Resigned	6 June 2026	Keiji Kuraishi	9 June 2026
Tokushima Vortis	Takefumi Otani	Resigned	8 June 2026	Takafumi Yoshimoto	8 June 2026
FC Imabari	Yuji Tsukada	Resigned	10 June 2026	Abel Mourelo López	11 June 2026
Júbilo Iwata	Fumitake Miura	Sacked	15 June 2026	Tadahiro Akiba	15 June 2026
RB Omiya Ardija	Mitsuhiro Toda	End of interim spell	23 June 2026	Narcís Pèlach	24 June 2026

==== During the season ====
Team	Outgoing manager	Manner	Date of vacancy	Position in table	Replaced by	Date of arrival
Iwaki FC	Yuzo Tamura	Mutual agreement	7 September 2026	18th	Kazuaki Tasaka	9 September 2026
FC Imabari	Abel Mourelo López	Sacked	21 September 2026	20th	Yoshikiyo Kuboyama	21 September 2026

== Foreign players ==
As of the 2024 season, there are no more restrictions on a number of signed foreign players, but clubs can only register up to five foreign players for a single match-day squad. Players from J.League partner nations (Thailand, Vietnam, Myanmar, Malaysia, Cambodia, Singapore, Indonesia and Qatar) are exempt from these restrictions.

- Players name in **bold** indicates the player is registered during the midseason transfer window.
- Player's name in italics indicates the player has Japanese nationality in addition to their FIFA nationality or is exempt from being treated as a foreign player due to having been born in Japan and being enrolled in, or having graduated from school in the country.

Team	Player 1	Player 2	Player 3	Player 4	Player 5	Player 6	Player 7	Player 8	Player 9	Former players
Albirex Niigata	(Australia) Jason Geria	(Brazil) Danilo Gomes	(Brazil) Iury Castilho	(Brazil) Matheus Moraes	(Dominican Republic) Noam Baumann	(New Zealand) Michael Fitzgerald				
Blaublitz Akita										
FC Imabari	(Brazil) Edigar Junio	(Brazil) Gabriel Gomes	(Brazil) Wesley Tanque	(Serbia) Aleksandar Paločević	(South Korea) Lee Young-jun	(South Korea) Taiga Son				
Fujieda MYFC	(South Korea) Wigi Kanemoto									
Hokkaido Consadole Sapporo	(Brazil) Mário Sérgio	(Brazil) Vini Peixoto	(Ghana) Kinglord Safo	(Sierra Leone) Amadou Bakayoko	(South Korea) Kim Geon-ung	(South Korea) Park Min-gyu	(Thailand) Itthimon Tippanet	(Thailand) Supachok Sarachat	(Thailand) Teerapat Pruetong	
Iwaki FC	(South Korea) Jeon Seo-ho	(South Korea) Joo Hyun-jin								
Júbilo Iwata	(Brazil) Danilo Cardoso	(Brazil) Iago Teles	(Brazil) João Victor	(Brazil) Matheus Peixoto	(Brazil) Yuri Lara					
Kataller Toyama	(South Korea) Jung Woo-young	(South Korea) Kang Min-woo	(South Korea) Kim Tae-won	(South Korea) Koh Bong-jo						
Montedio Yamagata	(Brazil) Thalisson	(South Korea) Lee Dong-hee								
Oita Trinita	(Brazil) Matheus Pereira	(Brazil) Patrick Verhon	(South Korea) Mun Kyung-gun							
RB Omiya Ardija	(Australia) Tom Glover	(Brazil) Carlinhos Júnior	(Brazil) Gabriel	(Brazil) Kauã Diniz	(Brazil) Mauricio Caprini	(Thailand) Suphanat Mueanta				
Sagan Tosu	(South Korea) Park Ho-min									
Shonan Bellmare	(Brazil) Arthur Silva	(Colombia) Fabián González								
Tegevajaro Miyazaki	(South Korea) Lee Chung-won									
Tochigi City	(Australia) Aidan Simmons	(Australia) Joe Caletti	(Brazil) Pedro Augusto	(Chile) Byron Vásquez	(Croatia) Matej Jonjić	(Norway) Tokmac Nguen	(South Korea) Kim Jin-hyeon			
Tokushima Vortis	(Brazil) Kaique Mafaldo	(Brazil) Lucas Barcellos	(Brazil) Thonny Anderson	(Nigeria) Lawrence Izuchukwu	(South Korea) Kang Young-kwang					
Vanraure Hachinohe	(Myanmar) Kaung Zan Mara									
Vegalta Sendai	(Brazil) Gustavo	(Brazil) Mateus Moraes	(South Korea) Han Ho-gang							
Ventforet Kofu	(Brazil) Holneiker Mendes	(Italy) Michele Staccioli	(South Korea) Lee Min-ki							
Yokohama FC	(Brazil) Adaílton	(Brazil) João Paulo	(Brazil) Lukian							

=== Foreign players by confederation ===
Foreign players by confederation
AFC (28)	Australia (4), Myanmar (1), South Korea (19), Thailand (4)
CAF (3)	Ghana (1), Nigeria (1), Sierra Leone (1)
CONCACAF (1)	Dominican Republic (1)
CONMEBOL(33)	Brazil (31), Chile (1), Colombia (1)
OFC (1)	New Zealand (1)
UEFA (4)	Croatia (1), Italy (1), Norway (1), Serbia (1),

== Standings ==
=== League table ===
Pos	Team	Pld	W	D	L	GF	GA	GD	Pts	Promotion, qualification or relegation
1	Albirex Niigata	18	11	2	5	27	27	0	35	Promotion to J1 League
2	Vegalta Sendai	18	10	4	4	33	16	+17	34	Promotion to J1 League
3	Omiya Ardija	18	9	6	3	32	21	+11	33	Qualification for the Promotion playoff
4	Tegevajaro Miyazaki	18	9	6	3	30	19	+11	33	Qualification for the Promotion playoff
5	Kataller Toyama	18	9	5	4	32	19	+13	32	Qualification for the Promotion playoff
6	Yokohama FC	18	9	4	5	32	21	+11	31	Qualification for the Promotion playoff
7	Júbilo Iwata	18	8	5	5	23	17	+6	29	
8	Hokkaido Consadole Sapporo	18	9	2	7	25	21	+4	29	
9	Shonan Bellmare	18	7	8	3	20	16	+4	29	
10	Iwaki FC	18	7	4	7	29	25	+4	25	
11	Sagan Tosu	18	7	3	8	19	21	−2	24	
12	Oita Trinita	18	5	8	5	21	21	0	23	
13	Blaublitz Akita	18	6	5	7	21	23	−2	23	
14	Tokushima Vortis	18	6	2	10	16	21	−5	20	
15	Fujieda MYFC	18	4	7	7	18	22	−4	19	
16	Montedio Yamagata	18	6	1	11	16	21	−5	19	
17	Vanraure Hachinohe	18	5	3	10	15	28	−13	18	
18	Tochigi City	18	4	3	11	27	35	−8	15	Relegation to the J3 League
19	FC Imabari	18	4	3	11	17	34	−17	15	Relegation to the J3 League
20	Ventforet Kofu	18	3	3	12	12	37	−25	12	Relegation to the J3 League

Updated to match(es) played on 22 November 2026. Source: J2 League Soccer King
Rules for classification: 1) Points; 2) Goal difference; 3) Goals scored; 4) Head-to-head points; 5) Head-to-head goal difference; 6) Head-to-head goal scored; 7) Fair-play points.

=== Position by round ===
Promotion to the J1 League	Qualification for the promotion playoff	Relegation to the J3 League

Team ╲ Round	1	2	3	4	5	6	7	8	9	10	11	12	13	14	15	16	17	18	19	20	21	22	23	24	25	26	27	28	29	30	31	32	33	34	35	36	37	38
Albirex Niigata	13	10	8	4	8	2	1	3	2	3	3	2	2	2	1	1	4	1																				
Blaublitz Akita	10	19	12	14	16	11	12	12	8	9	15	17	13	12	14	12	13	13																				
FC Imabari	12	20	20	20	20	20	20	20	19	17	18	19	19	19	19	19	19	19																				
Fujieda MYFC	4	1	5	3	4	8	7	9	7	8	9	10	15	15	16	16	15	15																				
Hokkaido Consadole Sapporo	1	8	14	17	17	19	19	19	18	20	17	14	12	9	7	7	9	8																				
Iwaki FC	6	11	15	18	18	17	13	15	16	14	8	9	9	8	11	8	10	10																				
Júbilo Iwata	11	15	12	7	11	9	9	13	14	11	11	11	14	11	9	9	7	7																				
Kataller Toyama	19	7	3	9	6	6	3	5	3	4	4	3	3	3	2	3	6	5																				
Montedio Yamagata	3	9	6	2	7	10	11	8	10	13	14	16	17	16	13	14	16	16																				
Oita Trinita	14	14	9	13	15	16	16	16	12	7	7	7	8	10	8	11	12	12																				
Omiya Ardija	7	3	1	1	1	1	5	2	4	2	2	5	6	5	4	5	2	3																				
Sagan Tosu	5	5	10	12	9	12	15	17	17	15	12	12	10	13	12	13	11	11																				
Shonan Bellmare	9	4	2	5	10	4	6	4	6	6	6	6	5	7	10	10	8	9																				
Tegevajaro Miyazaki	15	13	17	19	19	18	14	10	11	10	10	8	7	6	6	6	3	4																				
Tochigi City	17	6	4	10	5	5	8	11	13	16	16	18	18	18	18	18	17	18																				
Tokushima Vortis	20	17	18	15	12	14	10	7	9	12	13	13	11	14	15	15	14	14																				
Vanraure Hachinohe	2	12	16	11	14	15	18	14	15	19	19	15	16	17	17	17	18	17																				
Vegalta Sendai	16	17	11	6	3	3	2	1	1	1	1	1	1	1	5	4	1	2																				
Ventforet Kofu	18	16	19	16	13	13	17	18	20	18	20	20	20	20	20	20	20	20																				
Yokohama FC	8	2	7	8	2	7	4	6	5	5	5	4	4	4	3	2	5	6																				

Updated to match(es) played on 22 November 2026. Source: J2 League

== Results ==
=== Fixtures and results ===
Home \ Away	ALB	BBA	FCI	FUJ	HCS	IWA	JUB	KAT	MTO	OIT	OMI	SGT	SHB	TEG	TCI	TKV	VNH	VEG	VEN	YFC
Albirex Niigata			1–0	1–0	2–1		2–1	2–3	1–0			2–1		1–3		2–1		2–1		
Blaublitz Akita	2–2		1–0	1–1		a		0–4	3–1	2–1	0–0	1–0				4–1	a	a	3–0	
FC Imabari					0–4		0–2		0–3		2–3	1–0	1–2				3–3		1–1	
Fujieda MYFC			0–1			3–1	1–2		0–0		1–1		1–1			0–1	0–0	2–0	1–0	
Hokkaido Consadole Sapporo		1–0				2–1				1–1	1–4	1–2	1–0		1–4	2–0				
Iwaki FC	2–3	1–0	2–1				1–1		2–0									0–2	5–0	2–0
Júbilo Iwata		1–1			1–0			0–1		0–0	2–0	2–0	1–1			2–1	1–2			
Kataller Toyama			4–0	2–3	0–1					1–1			1–1	1–1	0–0	2–3		1–0		3–3
Montedio Yamagata		a			0–2			0–2				2–0		0–2	2–0	1–0		0–1	1–2	2–0
Oita Trinita	5–1		1–1	1–1		4–1			2–1				0–1		1–6		1–0		1–1	
Omiya Ardija	1–0					2–1		0–3	2–1	0–0			2–2				3–1		5–1	2–2
Sagan Tosu				1–0		1–3		1–2			2–1			2–0	1–3		2–0	1–1	2–0	
Shonan Bellmare	1–1	1–1				1–1			1–0			0–1			2–1			1–3		2–0
Tegevajaro Miyazaki		2–1		3–2	3–2	1–1	1–1			2–0	1–1		0–0		3–0					0–1
Tochigi City	0–3		1–2	2–2		1–3	1–3				0–3						5–0	1–3		1–1
Tokushima Vortis			1–2			1–0				1–0		0–0	1–2	1–2	3–0		0–1			0–1
Vanraure Hachinohe		1–0			0–1	2–2		2–0	1–2				0–1	0–3				0–2		0–2
Vegalta Sendai		4–0	3–1		1–1		2–1			0–0	1–2			4–2		0–0			5–1	
Ventforet Kofu	0–1				2–1		0–1	1–2						1–1	2–1	0–1	0–2			0–3
Yokohama FC	5–0	2–1	2–1	4–0	0–2		3–1			1–2		2–2								

Updated to match(es) played on 22 November 2026. Source: J2 League
Legend: Blue = home team win; Yellow = draw; Red = away team win.
For upcoming matches, an "a" indicates there is an article about the rivalry between the two participants.

=== Results by round ===
Team ╲ Round	1	2	3	4	5	6	7	8	9	10	11	12	13	14	15	16	17	18	19	20	21	22	23	24	25	26	27	28	29	30	31	32	33	34	35	36	37	38
Albirex Niigata	L	W	W	W	L	W	W	D	W	D	L	W	W	L	W	W	L	W																				
Blaublitz Akita	D	L	W	L	D	W	D	D	W	L	L	L	W	D	L	W	L	W																				
FC Imabari	L	L	L	L	D	W	L	L	W	W	D	L	L	D	L	L	L	W																				
Fujieda MYFC	W	W	L	W	D	L	D	D	D	L	D	D	L	D	L	L	W	L																				
Hokkaido Consadole Sapporo	W	L	L	L	L	D	D	L	W	L	W	W	W	W	W	W	L	W																				
Iwaki FC	W	L	L	L	L	W	W	L	L	W	W	D	D	W	L	W	D	D																				
Júbilo Iwata	D	L	W	W	L	W	L	L	L	W	D	D	D	W	W	D	W	W																				
Kataller Toyama	L	W	W	L	W	D	W	D	W	D	D	W	L	W	W	W	L	D																				
Montedio Yamagata	W	L	W	W	L	L	L	W	L	L	D	L	L	W	W	L	L	L																				
Oita Trinita	L	D	W	L	D	D	D	D	W	W	W	D	D	L	W	L	L	D																				
Omiya Ardija	W	W	W	D	D	D	D	W	D	W	L	L	D	W	W	W	W	L																				
Sagan Tosu	W	D	L	D	W	L	L	L	L	W	W	L	W	L	W	L	W	D																				
Shonan Bellmare	W	W	D	D	L	W	D	W	D	D	D	D	W	L	L	D	W	W																				
Tegevajaro Miyazaki	L	D	D	L	L	W	W	W	D	D	D	W	W	W	W	W	W	D																				
Tochigi City	L	W	W	L	W	D	L	L	L	L	D	D	L	L	L	L	W	L																				
Tokushima Vortis	L	D	L	W	W	L	W	W	L	L	D	L	W	L	L	L	W	L																				
Vanraure Hachinohe	W	L	L	W	D	L	L	W	L	L	D	W	L	L	L	L	D	W																				
Vegalta Sendai	L	D	W	W	W	D	W	W	W	W	D	W	L	L	L	W	W	D																				
Ventforet Kofu	L	D	L	W	W	L	L	L	L	W	L	L	D	D	L	L	L	L																				
Yokohama FC	W	W	L	D	W	L	W	D	W	L	D	W	D	W	W	W	L	L																				

Updated to match(es) played on 22 November 2026. Source: J2 League

== Promotion playoff ==
Based on the J2 placements at the end of the regular season, the third-placed team played against the sixth-placed, while the fourth-placed team played against the fifth-placed. The winners of the semi-finals played the final, with the winners promoted to the J1.

If a match was tied in the play-offs, the team with the highest league position are declared the winner. The rank order was: J2's third, fourth, fifth, and sixth-placed teams.

=== Bracket ===
Semi-finals
3
6
4
5

Final

=== Matches ===
Semifinals

2027	3th-placed of J2 League	v	6th-placed of J2 League
--:-- UTC+9

2027	4th-placed of J2 League	v	5th-placed of J2 League
--:-- UTC+9

Final

2027	Winner of Semifinal 1	v	Winner of Semifinal 2
--:-- UTC+9

== Attendances ==
=== Overall ===
Pos	Team	Total	High	Low	Average	Change
1	Albirex Niigata	176,468	28,949	9,252	17,647	n/a^{†}
2	Blaublitz Akita	49,472	10,847	1,531	4,839	n/a
3	FC Imabari	48,349	8,349	4,360	6,044	n/a
4	Fujieda MYFC	59,666	10,658	3,483	6,224	n/a
5	Hokkaido Consadole Sapporo	87,827	18,373	5,435	10,978	n/a
6	Iwaki FC	37,278	5,586	3,680	4,660	n/a
7	Júbilo Iwata	101,559	14,901	6,782	11,322	n/a
8	Kataller Toyama	59,694	8,713	3,141	5,927	n/a
9	Montedio Yamagata	102,128	18,453	5,837	11,348	n/a
10	Oita Trinita	73,217	14,373	6,095	8,135	n/a
11	RB Omiya Ardija	92,855	12,217	7,838	10,317	n/a
12	Sagan Tosu	77,558	18,116	4,823	8,524	n/a
13	Shonan Bellmare	65,538	13,545	4,421	8,192	n/a^{†}
14	Tegevajaro Miyazaki	30,153	4,104	1,641	3,017	n/a^{‡}
15	Tochigi City	30,097	4,246	2,050	3,248	n/a^{‡}
16	Tokushima Vortis	55,461	12,222	3,377	6,086	n/a
17	Vanraure Hachinohe	27,769	4,401	2,254	3,085	n/a^{‡}
18	Vegalta Sendai	120,819	18,323	9,860	13,424	n/a
19	Ventforet Kofu	67,425	9,857	4,948	7,691	n/a
20	Yokohama FC	116,112	53,973	5,823	14,808	n/a^{†}
	League total	1,479,445	53,973	1,531	8,319	n/a

Updated to games played on 22 November 2026
Source: J2 League
Notes:
^{†} Teams played previous season in J1 League
^{‡} Teams played previous season in J3 League

=== Home match played ===
Team \ Match played	1	2	3	4	5	6	7	8	9	10	11	12	13	14	15	16	17	18	19	Total
Albirex Niigata	28,949	18,382	17,298	20,708	16,730	9,252	20,585	17,220	12,399	14,945										176,468
Blaublitz Akita	6,781	4,462	4,693	4,078	10,847	4,560	3,608	2,989	1,531	5,923										49,472
FC Imabari	8,349	6,729	6,153	4,360	4,675	5,187	6,997	5,899												48,349
Fujieda MYFC	10,658	6,100	4,774	6,065	5,653	4,224	3,483	10,006	5,055	3,648										59,666
Hokkaido Consadole Sapporo	18,373	15,471	8,168	15,017	8,590	11,093	5,680	5,435												87,827
Iwaki FC	5,575	4,999	4,368	5,586	4,507	3,938	3,680	4,625												37,278
Júbilo Iwata	14,901	14,235	9,958	11,086	12,349	6,782	9,823	11,443	10,982											101,559
Kataller Toyama	8,713	6,028	5,872	4,977	6,877	7,193	3,994	8,371	4,528	3,141										59,694
Montedio Yamagata	17,289	12,058	9,849	9,648	10,124	18,453	8,036	5,837	10,834											102,128
Oita Trinita	14,373	7,537	7,914	8,263	6,095	6,901	9,099	6,812	6,223											73,217
Omiya Ardija	12,217	11,657	10,771	9,653	9,898	8,708	7,838	10,867	11,246											92,855
Sagan Tosu	18,116	8,243	9,578	7,147	7,134	6,678	4,823	6,475	9,364											77,558
Shonan Bellmare	11,583	9,069	6,515	13,545	5,239	4,421	7,780	7,386												65,538
Tegevajaro Miyazaki	3,561	2,918	2,981	2,743	2,412	3,293	1,641	4,104	3,498	3,002										30,153
Tochigi City	3,430	3,566	4,246	2,820	2,499	2,050	3,204	4,170	4,112											30,097
Tokushima Vortis	12,222	7,435	4,942	5,392	6,375	3,377	4,972	3,976	6,770											55,461
Vanraure Hachinohe	4,088	4,401	2,632	2,990	2,424	2,556	3,275	3,149	2,254											27,769
Vegalta Sendai	18,323	12,326	13,499	14,828	13,151	9,860	15,423	11,221	12,188											120,819
Ventforet Kofu	9,857	7,258	9,289	9,197	6,253	6,379	4,948	8,350	5,894											67,425
Yokohama FC	53,973	8,657	5,823	7,870	9,001	9,738	8,593	12,457												116,112
League total																				1,479,445

Source:data.j-league.or.jp

== Awards ==
=== Monthly MVP ===
Month	Player	Pos.	Club	Ref.
August	(Brazil) Carlinhos Júnior	FW	RB Omiya Ardija	
September	(Japan) Motohiko Nakajima	FW	Vegalta Sendai	
October	(Japan) Tomoki Tagawa	GK	Hokkaido Consadole Sapporo	

=== Goal of the Month ===
Month	Player	Pos.	Club	Ref.
August	(Japan) Kaiga Murakoshi	MF	Tegevajaro Miyazaki	
September	(Portugal) João Victor	FW	Júbilo Iwata	
October	(Japan) Hiroto Iwabuchi	MF	Vegalta Sendai	

=== Young Player of the Month ===
Month	Player	Pos.	Club	Ref.
August	(Japan) Yuto Kunitake	MF	Kataller Toyama	
September	(Japan) Rei Umeki	DF	FC Imabari	
October	(Japan) Kaito Konomi	MF	Hokkaido Consadole Sapporo	

=== Save of the Month ===
Month	Player	Club	Ref.
August	(Japan) Kai Chidi Kitamura	Tokushima Vortis	
September	(Japan) Akinori Ichikawa	Yokohama FC	
October	(Japan) John Higashi	Ventforet Kofu	

=== Manager of the Month ===
Month	Manager	Club	Ref.
August	(Japan) Tomoaki Makino	Fujieda MYFC	
September	(Japan) Ryo Adachi	Kataller Toyama	
October	(Japan) Kenta Kawai	Hokkiado Consadole Sapporo	

== Number of teams by prefecture ==
Number	Prefecture	Team(s)
2	Kanagawa Prefecture	Shonan Bellmare and Yokohama FC
2	Shizuoka Prefecture	Fujieda MYFC and Júbilo Iwata
1	Akita Prefecture	Blaublitz Akita
1	Aomori Prefecture	Vanraure Hachinohe
1	Ehime Prefecture	FC Imabari
1	Fukushima Prefecture	Iwaki FC
1	Hokkaido	Hokkaido Consadole Sapporo
1	Miyagi Prefecture	Vegalta Sendai
1	Miyazaki Prefecture	Tegevajaro Miyazaki
1	Niigata Prefecture	Albirex Niigata
1	Ōita Prefecture	Oita Trinita
1	Saga Prefecture	Sagan Tosu
1	Saitama Prefecture	Omiya Ardija
1	Tochigi Prefecture	Tochigi City
1	Tokushima Prefecture	Tokushima Vortis
1	Toyama Prefecture	Kataller Toyama
1	Yamagata Prefecture	Montedio Yamagata
1	Yamanashi Prefecture	Ventforet Kofu

== See also ==
- 2026–27 Emperor's Cup
- 2026–27 J.League Cup
- 2026–27 J1 League
- 2026–27 J3 League
- 2026–27 Japan Football League
- 2026 Japanese Regional Leagues
