= Takumi Tsuchiya =

Japanese footballer

Takumi Tsuchiya 土屋 巧
Personal information
- Full name: Takumi Tsuchiya
- Date of birth: 25 October 2003 (age 23)
- Place of birth: Tochigi Prefecture, Japan
- Height: 1.79 m (5 ft 10 in)
- Position: Midfielder

Team information
- Current team: FC Imabari
- Number: 39

Youth career
- Vertfee Takahara Nasu
- –2018: Wings SC
- 2019–2021: NSSU Kashiwa High School

Senior career*
Years	Team	Apps	(Gls)
2022–2026	Kashiwa Reysol	41	(0)
2025	→ Ventforet Kofu (loan)	30	(1)
2026–	FC Imabari	0	(0)
- * Club domestic league appearances and goals as of 08:48, 14 October 2026 (UTC)

Takumi Tsuchiya (土屋巧, Tsuchiya Takumi; born 25 October 2003) is a Japanese professional footballer who plays as a midfielder for J2 League club FC Imabari.

== Youth career ==
Representing Nippon Sport Science University Kashiwa High School, Tsuchiya primarily played as a centre-back and captained the team in his third year.

== Club career ==
In September 2021 it was announced that Tsuchiya would be joining the first-team squad of Kashiwa Reysol for the 2022 season. He made his debut on 13 April 2022, playing 90 minutes in a 3–1 J.League Cup victory against Sagan Tosu. He scored his first goal for the club in June 2022, scoring an equalizing goal in an eventual 2–1 win in the third round of the Emperor's Cup against Tokushima Vortis.

== Career statistics ==
=== Club ===
As of 14 October 2026

Appearances and goals by club, season and competition
Club	Season	League			National cup (Note: Includes Emperor's Cup)		League cup (Note: Includes J.League Cup)		Total	
Club	Season	Division	Apps	Goals	Apps	Goals	Apps	Goals	Apps	Goals
Kashiwa Reysol	2022	J1 League	3	0	1	1	2	0	6	1
Kashiwa Reysol	2023	J1 League	18	0	5	0	2	1	25	1
Kashiwa Reysol	2024	J1 League	20	0	1	0	2	0	23	0
Kashiwa Reysol	2026	J1 (100)	0	0	–		–		0	0
Kashiwa Reysol	Total		41	0	7	1	6	1	54	2
Ventforet Kofu (loan)	2025	J2 League	30	1	1	0	0	0	31	1
FC Imabari	2026–27	J2 League	0	0	0	0	0	0	0	0
Career total			71	1	8	1	6	1	85	3

== International career ==
In February 2022, Tsuchiya was called up to the Japan U-19 squad.
