= Taisei Takase =

Japanese footballer

Personal information
- Full name: Taisei Takase
- Date of birth: 8 February 2003 (age 23)
- Place of birth: Imabari, Ehime, Japan
- Height: 1.72 m (5 ft 8 in)
- Position: Forward

Team information
- Current team: FC Imabari
- Number: 13

Youth career
- –2014: Imabari SSS North
- 2015–2017: Hiyoshi Junior High School
- 2018–2020: Imabari Higashi High School

Senior career*
Years	Team	Apps	(Gls)
2021–	FC Imabari	48	(5)
- * Club domestic league appearances and goals as of 01:39, 14 January 2024

Taisei Takase (髙瀨 太聖, Takase Taisei; born 8 February 2003) is a Japanese footballer currently playing as a forward for FC Imabari.

== Early life ==
Taisei was born in Imabari. He played for Imabari City SSS North, Hiyoshi JR HS and Imabari Higashi Chutokyoiku HS during his youth.

== Career ==
Taisei made his debut for Imabari against Roasso Kumamoto on the 14 March 2021. He scored his first goal for the club against FC Gifu on the 2 October 2021, scoring in the 2 October 2021.

== Career statistics ==
=== Club ===
As of 20 March 2021.

Club	Season	League			National Cup		League Cup		Other		Total	
Club	Season	Division	Apps	Goals	Apps	Goals	Apps	Goals	Apps	Goals	Apps	Goals
FC Imabari	2021	J3 League	1	0	0	0	–		0	0	1	0
Career total			1	0	0	0	0	0	0	0	1	0
