= Danilo Cardoso =

Brazilian footballer (born 1997)

Personal information
- Full name: Danilo Cardoso Novais da Silva
- Date of birth: 27 March 1997 (age 29)
- Place of birth: Umuarama, Brazil
- Height: 1.83 m (6 ft 0 in)
- Position: Centre back

Team information
- Current team: Júbilo Iwata
- Number: 2

Youth career
- 2016: Palmeirinha
- 2017: Villa Nova

Senior career*
| Years | Team | Apps | (Gls) |
| 2018 | Villa Nova | 0 | (0) |
| 2018 | Athletic-MG | 15 | (0) |
| 2019–2020 | Coimbra | 4 | (0) |
| 2020–2023 | Athletic-MG | 35 | (1) |
| 2021 | → Inter de Limeira (loan) | 6 | (0) |
| 2021 | → Betim Futebol (loan) | 5 | (0) |
| 2021 | → Boston City Brasil (loan) | 8 | (0) |
| 2022 | → Vitória (loan) | 6 | (1) |
| 2022 | → Goiás (loan) | 5 | (1) |
| 2023 | → Londrina (loan) | 0 | (0) |
| 2023 | Náutico | 7 | (0) |
| 2024 | Athletic-MG | 28 | (3) |
| 2025 | FC Imabari | 33 | (1) |
| 2026 | Mito HollyHock | 14 | (0) |
| 2026– | Júbilo Iwata | 1 | (0) |
- * Club domestic league appearances and goals as of 14 August 2026

Danilo Cardoso Novais da Silva (born 27 March 1997), known as Danilo Cardoso or just Danilo, is a Brazilian footballer who plays as a central defender and currently play for J2 League club, Júbilo Iwata.

== Club career ==
Danilo was born in Umuarama, Paraná, and was a Villa Nova youth graduate. After being a part of the first team squad in the 2018 Campeonato Mineiro, he moved to Athletic-MG and achieved promotion from the Campeonato Mineiro Segunda Divisão.

In 2019, Danilo moved to Coimbra, and won the year's Campeonato Mineiro Módulo II with the club. In September 2020, he returned to Athletic, and again achieved promotion with the side.

On 1 June 2021, Danilo moved to Inter de Limeira on loan until the end of the Série D. He left the club for personal reasons on 28 July, and subsequently represented Betim Futebol and Boston City Brasil before returning to Athletic on 15 December 2021.

On 5 May 2022, Danilo was presented at Vitória. He asked to leave the club on 12 July, and joined Goiás six days later.

Danilo made his Série A debut on 23 July 2022, starting and scoring his team's second in a 3–3 away draw against São Paulo.

On 16 January 2025, Danilo was abroad to Japan for the first time and announce official transfer to J2 promoted club, FC Imabari for 2025 season.

On 10 January 2026, Danilo was announce official transfer to J1 promoted club, Mito HollyHock for 2026 season.

== Career statistics ==
=== Club ===
As of the start for 14 August 2026.

| Club | Season | League | | | State League | | Cup | | League Cup | | Continental | | Other | | Total | |
| Club | Season | Division | Apps | Goals | Apps | Goals | Apps | Goals | Apps | Goals | Apps | Goals | Apps | Goals | Apps | Goals |
|---|---|---|---|---|---|---|---|---|---|---|---|---|---|---|---|---|
| Villa Nova | 2018 | Mineiro | — | | 0 | 0 | — | | | | — | | — | | 0 | 0 |
| Athletic-MG | 2018 | Mineiro 2ª Divisão | — | | 15 | 0 | — | | | | — | | — | | 15 | 0 |
| Coimbra | 2019 | Mineiro Módulo II | — | | 4 | 0 | — | | | | — | | — | | 4 | 0 |
| Coimbra | 2020 | Mineiro | — | | 0 | 0 | — | | | | — | | — | | 0 | 0 |
| Coimbra | Subtotal | | — | | 4 | 0 | — | | | | — | | — | | 4 | 0 |
| Athletic-MG | 2020 | Mineiro Módulo II | — | | 9 | 1 | — | | | | — | | — | | 9 | 1 |
| Athletic-MG | 2021 | Mineiro | — | | 12 | 1 | — | | | | — | | — | | 12 | 1 |
| Athletic-MG | 2022 | Mineiro | — | | 13 | 0 | — | | | | — | | — | | 13 | 0 |
| Athletic-MG | Subtotal | | — | | 34 | 2 | — | | | | — | | — | | 34 | 2 |
| Inter de Limeira (loan) | 2021 | Série D | 6 | 0 | — | | | | — | | — | | — | | 6 | 0 |
| Betim Futebol (loan) | 2021 | Mineiro Módulo II | — | | 5 | 0 | — | | — | | — | | — | | 5 | 0 |
| Boston City Brasil (loan) | 2021 | Mineiro 2ª Divisão | — | | 8 | 0 | — | | — | | — | | — | | 8 | 0 |
| Vitória (loan) | 2022 | Série C | 6 | 1 | — | | 1 | 0 | — | | | | | | 7 | 1 |
| Goiás (loan) | 2022 | Série A | 2 | 1 | — | | | | | | | | | | 2 | 1 |
| Nautico | 2023 | Série C | 7 | 0 | — | | | | | | | | | | 7 | 0 |
| Athletic-MG | 2024 | Série A | 20 | 2 | — | | 2 | 0 | — | | | | | | 22 | 2 |
| FC Imabari | 2025 | J2 League | 33 | 1 | — | | 1 | 0 | 0 | 0 | — | | | | 34 | 1 |
| Mito HollyHock | 2026 | J1 League | 14 | 1 | — | | | | | | | | | | 14 | 1 |
| Júbilo Iwata | 2026–27 | J2 League | 1 | 0 | — | | 0 | 0 | 0 | 0 | — | | | | 1 | 0 |
| Career total | | | 89 | 6 | 66 | 2 | 3 | 0 | 0 | 0 | 0 | 0 | 0 | 0 | 158 | 8 |

== Honours ==
Coimbra

- Campeonato Mineiro Módulo II: 2019
