= ASICS Satoyama Stadium =

Football stadium in Imabari, Ehime, Japan

ASICS Satoyama Stadium アシックス里山スタジアム
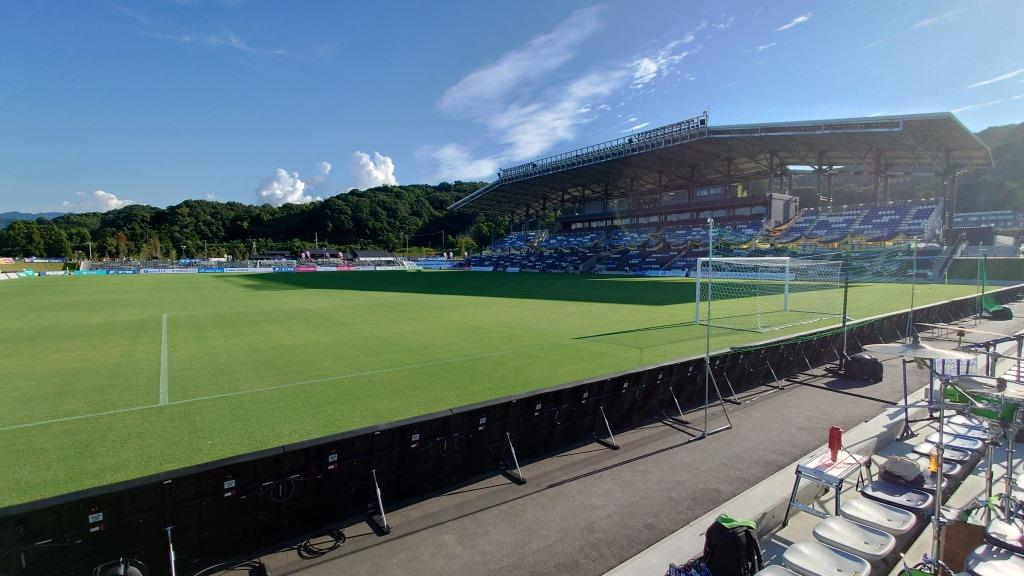
- ASICS Satoyama Stadium from the away end (August 2023)
- Interactive map of ASICS Satoyama Stadium アシックス里山スタジアム
- Full name: ASICS Satoyama Stadium
- Address: 1–3 Takahashi Fureai no Oka, Imabari, Ehime Prefecture
- Location: Imabari, Ehime, Japan
- Coordinates: 34°2′26″N 132°57′31.2″E
- Owner: Imabari Yume Village Co., Ltd
- Operator: Imabari Yume Village Co., Ltd
- Capacity: 5,316
- Type: Stadium
- Event: Sporting events
- Surface: Grass
- Public transit: JR Shikoku; Yosan Line at Imabari Station

Construction
- Built: October 2021–January 2023
- Opened: 2023
- Cost: Approx. ¥4 billion (US$25.27 million)
- Main contractor: Rinkai Nissan Construction

Tenant
- FC Imabari

Website
- Satoyama Stadium website

ASICS Satoyama Stadium (アシックス里山スタジアム) is a football stadium in Imabari, Ehime, Japan, which has a seating capacity of 5,316. It has been the home of FC Imabari since 2023.

== History ==
After Takeshi Okada took over FC Imabari in 2014, he introduced a vision for the club to become a successful J1 League by 2025, alongside the development of a 20,000-capacity stadium complex. In 2016, while still playing in the Shikoku Soccer League, the club were recognised as one of the JFA J.League Hundred Year Vision clubs, and to eventually gain promotion to the J3 League, they would need a new stadium with at least 5,000 seats. Consequently, the Arigato Service Dream Stadium was constructed in 2016, with the club taking residence there from 2017 until 2023.

Since J2 League clubs require a stadium with a capacity of 10,000 people, and J1 League clubs require 15,000, Okada proposed building a new 15,000-seat stadium on Imabari's vacant Sports Park land by 2023. He stated it would be too difficult to expand their current stadium. The club announced that they would lease municipal land in Imabari City for free, while raising the necessary ¥4 billion (US$25.27 million) from local companies and banks to fund the stadium's construction.

Construction was initially scheduled to begin in October 2020, but was delayed by a year due to the COVID-19 pandemic. Eventually, a groundbreaking ceremony took place in October 2021, and work on the new Satoyama Stadium began the following month.

The stadium was completed in time for the start of the 2023 J3 League season, with the opening ceremony being held on 29 January 2023. The club were awarded a J2 license for the upcoming 2023 season, meaning their facilities were deemed good enough should they have been promoted to the J2 League.

On 5 March, FC Imabari played their first match of the season at the new stadium against Fukushima United in the J3 League, which ended in a 1–0 win for Imabari. The match drew a record attendance of 5,424 people, the highest in the clubs history. Throughout the 2023 season, the club played 19 home matches, with an average attendance of 3,711.

== Structure and facilities ==
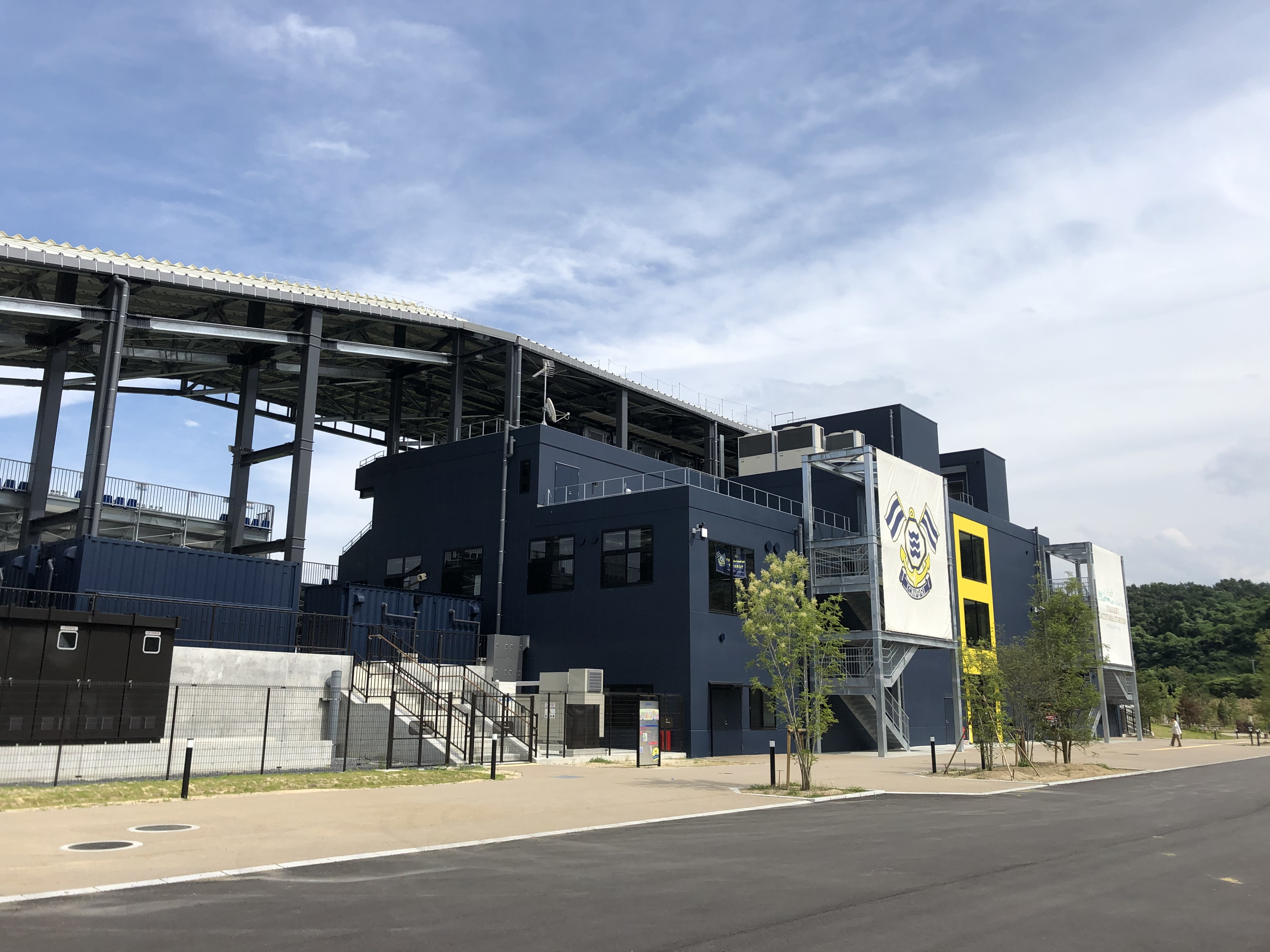
The clubhouse side of the stadium

Satoyama Stadium is built on an area of approximately 5.7 hectares. In addition to the stadium, the site includes a dog park, an outdoor event space, and other community-focused spaces. The goal of the stadium is to foster a strong sense of community by encouraging local involvement and revitalising the city of Imabari. As the stadium is located on a hill, visitors have views of the city below. Designed as an open stadium, it provides the concept of 'satoyama' by having a connection with the surrounding natural environment, which is an appropriate style of stadium for the rural location. Conceptually, the stadium follows a pirate ship theme, due to the city's historical ties to the Murakami Clan "pirates".

=== Stands ===
The stands are constructed from steel and are placed on a concrete floor, allowing for future expansion. The main stand consists of two tiers and has a roof that covers most seats, while the other three sides of the stadium are open. Premium, central seats are cushioned and have drink holders, while seats become more basic farther along the stand. There are wheelchair viewing spaces in the main stand and north side behind the goal. Away supporters are seated behind the goal on the stadium's north side. The distance from the stands to the pitch is 8 meters.

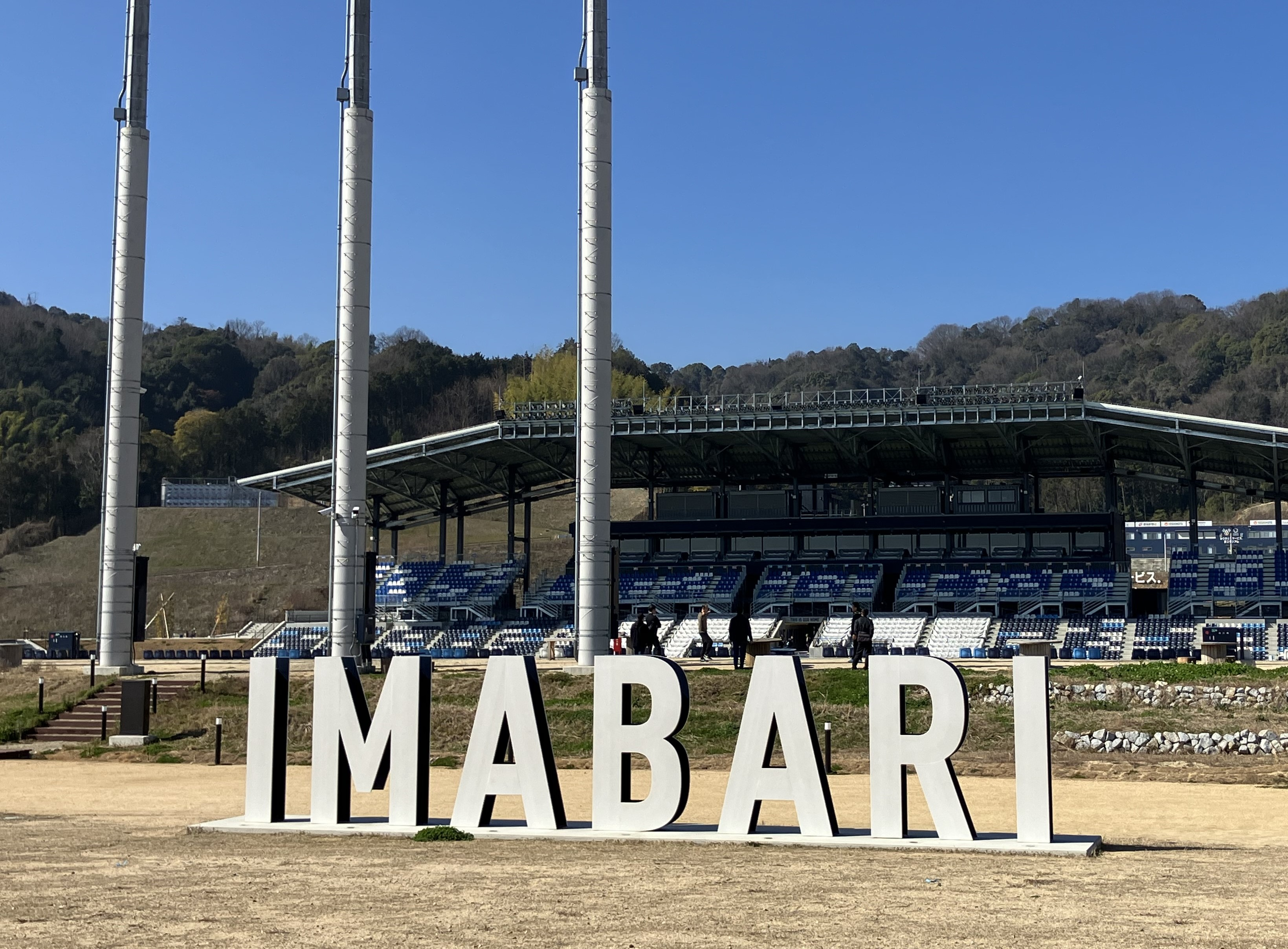
The Imabari Monument installed inside the stadium

=== Facilities ===
The stadium has 14 VIP rooms, each approximately 22 square meters, along with 15 special seats. The toilet blocks are built from shipping containers that were originally used in the 2020 Summer Olympics. They also tie into the overall ship theme of the stadium. The venue also includes a guest room that can serve as a meeting space, a lounge area for VIPs during games, and various offices and facilities for press conferences, announcements, and broadcasts.

=== Upgrades ===
In September 2025, it was announced that the stadium would be getting an approximate 3,500 seat expansion to take the new capacity to around 8,900. The construction is due to begin at the end of the 2025 J2 League season, with completion expected in August 2026.

== Naming rights ==
The concept of the new stadium is "satoyama", symbolising the coexistence of nature and people. The original name of the stadium was Imabari Satoyama Stadium. In March 2024, FC Imabari agreed a naming rights agreements with Asics and the official name of the stadium became ASICS Satoyama Stadium. The naming rights contract period will run from 1 May 2024 to 31 January 2029. The stadium name can be abbreviated to "Ashisato".

== Transport ==
=== Train ===
- 10 minutes by taxi or 15 minutes by bus from Imabari Station on the JR Yosan Line.

=== Bus ===
- 15 minutes by the Setouchi Bus "Imabari Ekimae" stop to the AEON Mall Imabari Shintoshi shuttle or a bus going in the same direction. The stadium is then a 10-minute walk from the AEON Mall Imabari Shintoshi bus stop.

=== Car ===
- 5 minutes from the Imabari interchange on the Nishiseto Expressway.
- 25 minutes from the Imabari Yonoura interchange on the Matsuyama Expressway.

== See also ==
- List of football stadiums in Japan
