= Pipi (footballer, born 2003) =

Japanese footballer (born 2003)

Personal information
- Full name: Takuhiro Nakai
- Date of birth: 24 October 2003 (age 23)
- Place of birth: Ōtsu, Shiga, Japan
- Height: 1.82 m (6 ft 0 in)
- Position: Midfielder

Team information
- Current team: FC Imabari
- Number: 80

Youth career
- 2008–2014: Azul Shiga
- 2014–2022: Real Madrid

Senior career*
Years	Team	Apps	(Gls)
2022–2025	Real Madrid B	2	(0)
2023–2024	→ Rayo Majadahonda (loan)	18	(0)
2024–2025	→ Amorebieta (loan)	11	(0)
2025	→ Rayo Cantabria (loan)	7	(0)
2025–2026	Leganés B	10	(0)
2026–	FC Imabari	2	(0)

International career^{‡}
2018	Japan U16	3	(0)
2022	Japan U20	2	(0)
- * Club domestic league appearances and goals as of 17 August 2026 ‡ National team caps and goals as of 18:44, 6 August 2023 (UTC)

Takuhiro Nakai (中井 卓大, Nakai Takuhiro; born 24 October 2003), known in Spain as Pipi, is a Japanese professional footballer who plays as a midfielder for FC Imabari.

== Club career ==
Pipi was born in Shiga, Japan, and was spotted by Spanish giants Real Madrid while playing in one of their training camps in Japan. He was invited for a trial in Spain and impressed enough to sign a contract in 2014. Prior to his move to Spain, Pipi had been playing for Azul Shiga. After Real Madrid was sanctioned heavily in 2016 by the Court of Arbitration for Sport (CAS), it was Nakai's mother who offered testimony that prevented Madrid from suffering further punishment. Her testimony also meant that her son would avoid punishment, as his move to Madrid had been under investigation by the CAS.

In October 2020, Pipi was called up to train with the Real Madrid senior squad for the first time. He was seen as one of Real Madrid's best prospects, and was named in English newspaper The Guardian's "Next Generation 2021", highlighting the best players born in 2003 worldwide.

In February 2022, Pipi signed a contract extension with Real Madrid until 2025. Ahead of the 2022–23 season, Pipi was promoted to Real Madrid Castilla from the club's under-19 side. Pipi made his debut for Castilla on 25 September 2022, coming on as a substitute in a 3–1 victory over CD Badajoz.

== International career ==
Pipi was called up for the Japan under-16 side in 2018. He featured in three friendly games for the under-16 side, before going on to make two appearances at under-20 level in 2022.

== Career statistics ==
As of 13 January 2024.

Appearances and goals by club, season and competition
Club	Season	League			Cup		Other		Total	
Club	Season	Division	Apps	Goals	Apps	Goals	Apps	Goals	Apps	Goals
Real Madrid U19	2021–22	—					2 (Note: Appearances in UEFA Youth League)	0	2	0
Real Madrid Castilla	2022–23	Primera Federación	2	0	—		0	0	2	0
Rayo Majadahonda (loan)	2023–24	Primera Federación	11	0	0	0	0	0	11	0
Career total			13	0	0	0	2	0	15	0
