= J1 100 Year Vision League =

Japan Professional Football League tournament

- English language logo in horizontal
- Season: 2026
- Dates: 6 February – 23 May 2026 (regional round); 30 May – 7 June 2026 (playoffs)
- Champions: Vissel Kobe
- Champions League Elite: Vissel Kobe; Gamba Osaka (via ACL2)
- Matches: 182
- Goals: 437 (2.4 per match)
- Top goalscorer: Léo Ceará (10 goals)
- Biggest home win: Gamba Osaka 5–0 Vissel Kobe (2 May 2026); Cerezo Osaka 6–1 Nagoya Grampus (17 May 2026)
- Biggest away win: Kawasaki Frontale 0–5 Yokohama F. Marinos (22 March 2026)
- Highest scoring: Kawasaki Frontale 5–3 Kashiwa Reysol (8 February 2026)
- Longest winning run: 7 matches Kashima Antlers
- Longest unbeaten run: 12 matches Kashima Antlers
- Longest winless run: 8 matches Avispa Fukuoka; Kyoto Sanga
- Longest losing run: 6 matches Kashiwa Reysol
- Highest attendance: 52,934; FC Tokyo 3–0 Yokohama F. Marinos (7 March 2026)
- Lowest attendance: 4,126; Avispa Fukuoka 1–1 (4–5 p) Shimizu S-Pulse (18 March 2026)
- Total attendance: 3,607,221
- Average attendance: 21,219
- All statistics correct as of 17 May 2026.

The J1 100 Year Vision League, also known as the Meiji Yasuda J1 100 Year Vision League (Japanese: 明治安田J1百年構想リーグ, Hepburn: Meiji Yasuda J1 Hyakunen Kōsō Rīgu), was a one-off football tournament organised by the Japan Professional Football League, held from 6 February to 7 June 2026 and featuring all 20 J1 League clubs. A similar tournament was held for J2 and J3 League clubs.

== Overview ==
As the Japan Professional Football League (J.League) transitions to an "autumn-spring system" in 2026, the J.League 100 Year Vision League was held as a special tournament in the interim. Meiji Yasuda Life, the league's title partner through the end of 2026, also serves as the title partner of this tournament.

Although this tournament was a league competition organized by the J.League, there was no relegation to the J2 League.

The two finalists qualified to the 2026–27 AFC Champions League Elite league stage. (Note: According to the AFC entry regulations, the Champions League Two winners, which was Gamba Osaka, if they have not already qualified through their domestic performance, will obtain the lowest slot in their country for the Champions League Elite. In addition, Japan's 4th qualification slot for the Champions League Elite receives a bye to the league stage due to an insufficient number of participating teams.)

== Format ==
Regional round (6 February – 23 May)

The 20 teams competing in the 2026–27 J1 League—the top 17 teams from the 2025 J1 League as well as three promoted sides from the 2025 J2 League—are divided into regions East and West, consists of 10 teams each. Each team play a double round-robin home and away format within their region. Clubs from the same prefecture are grouped together. In addition, the number of clubs playing in snowy regions, where home games cannot be played in February and March was also taken into consideration. If a match ended in a draw within 90 minutes, a penalty shoot-out is played to decide the winners. For this tournament, the usual points system is retained, but the winners of the shoot-out receive two points and the losers receive one point.

The East region consists of 10 clubs based within the Greater Tokyo Area, while the West region consists of 10 teams based outside of the capital and its surrounding metropolitan area.

West	East		
West	East	Shimizu S-Pulse; Nagoya Grampus; Kyoto Sanga; Gamba Osaka; Cerezo Osaka; Vissel Kobe; Fagiano Okayama; Sanfrecce Hiroshima; Avispa Fukuoka; V-Varen Nagasaki	Kashima Antlers; Mito HollyHock; Urawa Red Diamonds; JEF United Chiba; Kashiwa Reysol; FC Tokyo; Tokyo Verdy; Machida Zelvia; Kawasaki Frontale; Yokohama F. Marinos

Playoff round (30 May – 7 June)

Teams with the same final rank in each region will play home and away matches against each other to determine the overall final ranking (for example, matches between first-placed teams will decide the overall champions and runners-up, matches between second-placed teams will decide overall third and fourth place). The first leg will be played on 30 and 31 May, and the second leg will be held on 6 and 7 June. Based on the final standings of the 2025 season, the teams from the East region will host the second leg in each matchup.

If the winners on aggregate cannot be determined after the two legs of 90 minutes, two 15-minute periods of extra time will be played; if the winners is still not decided after extra time, a penalty shoot-out will be played.

Prize money

The top three teams at the end of the tournament will receive the prize money of JPY 150 million for the winners, JPY 60 million for runners-up, and JPY 30 million for the third place. During the regional round, each point is worth JPY 2 million. All teams will also receive additional fees based on their competition ranking and popularity ranking.

== Clubs ==
Locations of the teams
Teams in Keihanshin
Teams in Greater Tokyo Area
Teams in Tokyo and its immediate surrounding areas

Club	Location	Stadium	Capacity
Kashima Antlers	Ibaraki Prefecture	Kashima Soccer Stadium	39,095
Mito HollyHock	Ibaraki Prefecture	K's denki Stadium Mito	10,152
Urawa Red Diamonds	Saitama Prefecture	Saitama Stadium 2002	62,040
JEF United Chiba	Chiba Prefecture	Fukuda Denshi Arena	19,470
Kashiwa Reysol	Chiba Prefecture	Sankyo Frontier Kashiwa Stadium	15,109
FC Tokyo	Tokyo	Ajinomoto Stadium	47,851
Tokyo Verdy	Tokyo	Ajinomoto Stadium	47,851
Machida Zelvia	Tokyo	Machida GION Stadium	15,320
Kawasaki Frontale	Kanagawa Prefecture	Uvance Todoroki Stadium by Fujitsu	26,827
Yokohama F. Marinos	Kanagawa Prefecture	Nissan Stadium	71,624
Shimizu S-Pulse	Shizuoka Prefecture	IAI Stadium Nihondaira	19,594
Nagoya Grampus	Aichi Prefecture	Toyota Stadium	42,753
Kyoto Sanga	Kyoto Prefecture	Sanga Stadium by Kyocera	21,269
Gamba Osaka	Osaka Prefecture	Panasonic Stadium Suita	39,694
Cerezo Osaka	Osaka Prefecture	Yodoko Sakura Stadium	24,481
Vissel Kobe	Hyōgo Prefecture	Noevir Stadium Kobe	27,974
Fagiano Okayama	Okayama Prefecture	JFE Harenokuni Stadium	15,479
Sanfrecce Hiroshima	Hiroshima Prefecture	Edion Peace Wing Hiroshima	28,407
Avispa Fukuoka	Fukuoka Prefecture	Best Denki Stadium	21,546
V-Varen Nagasaki	Nagasaki Prefecture	Peace Stadium Connected by SoftBank	20,268

=== Personnel and kits ===
Club	Manager	Captain	Kit manufacturer	Kit sponsors	
Club	Manager	Captain	Kit manufacturer	Main	Other(s)
Avispa Fukuoka	(Japan) Shinya Tsukahara (interim)	(Japan) Tatsuki Nara	(Japan) Yonex	Shin Nihon Seiyaku	List: Front: Agekke Corporation, Hakata Green Hotel; Back: Apaman Property, Septeni; Sleeves: Soft Service, Fukuoka; Shorts: None
Cerezo Osaka	(Australia) Arthur Papas	(Japan) Shunta Tanaka	(Japan) Mizuno	Yanmar	List: Front: Yodoko, Capcom; Back: Schau Essen; Sleeves: Nikkon Holdings, Osaka, Sakai; Shorts: None
Fagiano Okayama	(Japan) Takashi Kiyama	(Japan) Ryo Takeuchi	(Brazil) Penalty	GROP	List: Front: Healthy Home Inc., Serio Inc.; Back: un-deux Co., Okanetsu; Sleeves: Okayama Shinkin Bank; Shorts: Sanyo Shimbun, Bisho Co., Ltd.
FC Tokyo	(Japan) Rikizo Matsuhashi	(Japan) Sei Muroya	(United States) New Balance	Tokyo Gas	List: Front: Mitsui & Co., Mixi; Back: Mitsubishi Corporation; Sleeves: Keio Corporation; Shorts: Mixi
Gamba Osaka	(Germany) Jens Wissing	(Japan) Shinnosuke Nakatani	(Denmark) Hummel	Panasonic	List: Front: Daicel, Panasonic; Back: Rohto Pharmaceutical, Ship Healthcare; Sleeves: Toyo Tires, Osaka; Shorts: Suita
JEF United Chiba	(Japan) Yoshiyuki Kobayashi	(Japan) Daisuke Suzuki	(Denmark) Hummel	Fuji Electric	List: Front: JR East, Furukawa Electric; Back: JRE Mall, ShinShowa; Sleeves: TPX Abel; Shorts:
Kashima Antlers	(Japan) Toru Oniki	(Japan) Gaku Shibasaki	(United States) Nike	LIXIL	List: Front: Mercari; Back: YellowHat, Riso Kagaku Corporation; Sleeves: Nippon Steel; Shorts: Kaneka Corporation, Takasago Thermal Engineering
Kashiwa Reysol	(Spain) Ricardo Rodríguez	(Japan) Tomoya Inukai	(Japan) Yonex	Hitachi	List: Front: Sankyo Frontier, Hitachi Systems; Back: Aflac, Hitachi Building Systems; Sleeves: Hitachi Plant Services; Shorts: Lawson Ticket, Hitachi High-Tech Corporation
Kawasaki Frontale	(Japan) Shigetoshi Hasebe	(Japan) Yasuto Wakizaka	(Germany) Puma	Fujitsu	List: Front: Anker, Renosy, Sustainable Development Goals; Back: SMBC Nikko Securities, PwC; Sleeves: Ebara Foods, Kawasaki; Shorts: Matsuo Komuten
Kyoto Sanga	(South Korea) Cho Kwi-jae	(Japan) Shimpei Fukuoka	(Germany) Puma	Kyocera	List: Front: Wacoal, Horiba; Back: Nintendo, au; Sleeves: Bank of Kyoto, Kyoto; Shorts: Daiwa Securities Group
Machida Zelvia	(Japan) Go Kuroda	(Japan) Gen Shoji	(Germany) Adidas	CyberAgent	List: Front: Rudel Inc., Avex; Back: Odakyu Electric Railway; Sleeves: Tamagawa University, Machida; Shorts: Daiwa Securities Group
Mito HollyHock	(Japan) Daisuke Kimori	(Japan) Takahiro Iida (Japan) Arata Watanabe	(Japan) Soccer Junky	K's Holdings	List: Front: Adastria; Back: JX Advanced Metals; Sleeves: Mito, Hitachi, Hitachinaka, Kasama, Naka, Omitama, Hitachiota, Kitaibaraki, Hitachiomiya, Takahagi, Ibaraki, Shirosato, Oarai, Daigo, Tokai; Shorts:
Nagoya Grampus	(Serbia) Mihailo Petrović	(Japan) Ryuji Izumi	(Japan) Mizuno	Toyota GR Yaris	List: Front: Workstaff Co., Proto Corporation; Back: Denso, Toyota Tsusho; Sleeves: Yahagi Engineering, Nagoya, Miyoshi; Shorts: ITOCO
Sanfrecce Hiroshima	(Germany) Bartosch Gaul	(Japan) Sho Sasaki	(United States) Nike	EDION	List: Front: Hisense, EDION Hikari; Back: Mazda, Hirogin Holdings; Sleeves: youme Town Hiroshima, One Ball, One World; Shorts: Teral Group, Mobile e Hoken
Shimizu S-Pulse	(Japan) Takayuki Yoshida	(Japan) Zento Uno	(Germany) Puma	Suzuyo (Home & Away) / Star Micronics (Third)	List: Front: ITEC, Taica; Back: IAI, Harada Group; Sleeves: Japan Airlines, Shizuoka; Shorts: Taica, Suruga Giken Co.
Tokyo Verdy	(Japan) Hiroshi Jofuku	(Japan) Koki Morita	(Brazil) Athleta	Nicigas	List: Front: The Super Sports XEBIO; Back: Miroku Jyoho Service, Classmethod; Sleeves: Good Com Asset, Tokyo; Shorts: BRI Group
Urawa Red Diamonds	(Japan) Tatsuya Tanaka (interim)	(Japan) Ryoma Watanabe	(United States) Nike	Polus	List: Front: Enecle; Back: Mitsubishi Heavy Industries; Sleeves: Mitsubishi Motors; Shorts: DHL, Mitsubishi Delica D5
Vissel Kobe	(Germany) Michael Skibbe	(Japan) Tetsushi Yamakawa	(Japan) Asics	Rakuten Mobile	List: Front: Danton, Seiban; Back: Kawasaki, Henri Charpentier; Sleeves: Noevir, Kobe; Shorts:
V-Varen Nagasaki	(Japan) Takuya Takagi	(Japan) Hotaru Yamaguchi	(United States) Fanatics	Japanet	List: Front: Transcosmos, Memolead; Back: MSC Cruises, MS&AD Insurance Group; Sleeves: Moririn, Fair and Just ~from Nagasaki to the world~, Nagasaki; Shorts:
Yokohama F. Marinos	(Japan) Hideo Ōshima	(Japan) Takuya Kida	(Germany) Adidas	Nissan	List: Front: DRAFT; Back: Nisshin OilliO; Sleeves: Yokohama, Yokosuka, Yamato; Shorts: Morinaga In Jelly

=== Managerial changes ===
Team	Outgoing manager	Manner of departure	Date of vacancy	Position in the table	Incoming manager	Date of appointment
Nagoya Grampus	(Japan) Kenta Hasegawa	End of contract	12 November 2025	Pre-season	(Serbia) Mihailo Petrović	18 December 2025
Shimizu S-Pulse	(Japan) Tadahiro Akiba	End of contract	6 December 2025	Pre-season	(Japan) Takayuki Yoshida	8 December 2025
Mito HollyHock	(Japan) Naoki Mori	Promoted as football director	8 December 2025	Pre-season	(Japan) Daisuke Kimori	8 December 2025
Vissel Kobe	(Japan) Takayuki Yoshida	End of contract	9 December 2025	Pre-season	(Germany) Michael Skibbe	14 December 2025
Sanfrecce Hiroshima	(Germany) Michael Skibbe	Mutual consent	10 December 2025	Pre-season	(Germany) Bartosch Gaul	15 December 2025
Gamba Osaka	(Spain) Dani Poyatos	End of contract	11 December 2025	Pre-season	(Germany) Jens Wissing	12 December 2025
Avispa Fukuoka	(South Korea) Kim Myung-hwi	Sacked	5 January 2026	Pre-season	(Japan) Shinya Tsukahara (interim)	5 January 2026
Urawa Red Diamonds	(Poland) Maciej Skorża	Sacked	28 April 2026	7th (East)	(Japan) Tatsuya Tanaka (interim)	28 April 2026
Kyoto Sanga	(South Korea) Cho Kwi-jae	Stepped down	21 May 2026	10th (West)	(Japan) Tatsuma Yoshida (interim)	21 May 2026
Yokohama F. Marinos	(Japan) Hideo Ōshima	Sacked	3 June 2026	7th (East)		

=== Foreign players ===
From the 2019 season, there are no limitations on signing foreign players, but clubs can only register up to five of them for a single matchday squad. Players from J.League partner nations (Thailand, Vietnam, Morocco, Malaysia, Cambodia, Singapore, Indonesia) were exempted from these restrictions.

- Players name in **bold** indicates the player is registered during the mid-season transfer window.
- Player's name in italics indicates the player has Japanese nationality in addition to their FIFA nationality, holds the nationality of a J.League partner nation, or is exempt from being treated as a foreign player due to having been born in Japan and being enrolled in, or having graduated from an approved type of school in the country.

Club	Player 1	Player 2	Player 3	Player 4	Player 5	Player 6	Player 7	Player 8	Player 9	Former player (s)
Avispa Fukuoka	(Iran) Shahab Zahedi	(South Korea) Kim Moon-hyeon	(Switzerland) Nassim Ben Khalifa							
Cerezo Osaka	(Australia) Kusini Yengi	(Brazil) Lucas Fernandes	(Brazil) Thiago Andrade	(Malaysia) Dion Cools	(South Korea) Kim Jin-hyeon	(South Korea) Wigi Kanemoto				
Fagiano Okayama	(Bolivia) Yuto Baigorria	(Brazil) Léo Gaúcho	(Brazil) Lucão	(Brazil) Werik Popó	(Germany) Lennart Moser					
FC Tokyo	(Brazil) Marcelo Ryan	(Denmark) Alexander Scholz	(South Korea) Kim Seung-gyu							
Gamba Osaka	(Brazil) Welton	(China) Zhang Aolin	(Tunisia) Issam Jebali	(Turkey) Deniz Hümmet						(Germany) Philipp Max
JEF United Chiba	(Brazil) Carlinhos Júnior	(Brazil) Dudu Pacheco	(Spain) José Aurelio Suárez							
Kashima Antlers	(Brazil) Élber	(Brazil) Léo Ceará	(Serbia) Aleksandar Čavrić	(South Korea) Kim Tae-hyeon						
Kashiwa Reysol										
Kawasaki Frontale	(Brazil) Erison	(Brazil) Marcinho	(China) Noriharu Kan	(Croatia) Filip Uremović	(Germany) Svend Brodersen	(Serbia) Lazar Romanić	(South Korea) Lee Keun-hyeong			
Kyoto Sanga	(Brazil) Alex Souza	(Brazil) Barreto	(Brazil) David Silva	(Brazil) Henrique Trevisan	(Brazil) João Pedro	(Brazil) Marco Túlio	(Brazil) Rafael Elias	(South Korea) Yoon Sung-jun		
Machida Zelvia	(Australia) Tete Yengi	(Brazil) Erik	(Chile) Byron Vásquez	(Kosovo) Ibrahim Drešević	(Myanmar) Kaung Zan Mara	(South Korea) Cha Je-hoon	(South Korea) Kim Min-tae	(South Korea) Na Sang-ho		
Mito HollyHock	(Brazil) Danilo Cardoso	(Brazil) Matheus Leiria	(Brazil) Patryck Ferreira							
Nagoya Grampus	(Brazil) Marcus Índio	(Brazil) Mateus Castro	(Togo) Yves Avelete							
Sanfrecce Hiroshima	(Germany) Tolgay Arslan	(South Korea) Kim Ju-sung								
Shimizu S-Pulse	(Brazil) Capixaba	(Brazil) Mateus Brunetti	(Brazil) Matheus Bueno	(Bulgaria) Ahmed Ahmedov	(Panama) Alfredo Stephens	(South Korea) Eom Joo-young	(South Korea) Oh Se-hun	(South Korea) Park Seung-wook	(United States) Jelani Reshaun Sumiyoshi	
Tokyo Verdy	(Brazil) Matheus Vidotto									
Urawa Red Diamonds	(Australia) Luka Didulica	(Brazil) Danilo Boza	(Brazil) Matheus Sávio	(Sweden) Isaac Kiese Thelin	(Sweden) Samuel Gustafson					
Vissel Kobe	(Brazil) Caetano	(Brazil) Diego	(Brazil) Jean Patric	(Brazil) Matheus Thuler	(Nigeria) Richard Monday Ubong					
V-Varen Nagasaki	(Brazil) Diego Pituca	(Brazil) Eduardo	(Brazil) Emerson Deocleciano	(Brazil) Matheus Jesus	(Brazil) Thiago Santana	(Jamaica) Norman Campbell	(Serbia) Luka Radotić	(South Korea) Noh Hyeung-jun		
Yokohama F. Marinos	(Australia) Thomas Deng	(Belgium) Jordy Croux	(Brazil) Tevis Gabriel	(Brazil) Yuri	(Colombia) Jeison Quiñones					

== League table ==
=== East Region ===
Pos	Team	Pld	W	PKW	PKL	L	GF	GA	GD	Pts	Qualification
1	Kashima Antlers	18	13	2	2	1	29	9	+20	45	Final
2	FC Tokyo	18	9	4	2	3	28	16	+12	37	3rd–4th place playoff
3	Machida Zelvia	18	8	5	3	2	23	19	+4	37	5th–6th place playoff
4	Kawasaki Frontale	18	7	3	1	7	23	27	−4	28	7th–8th place playoff
5	Tokyo Verdy	18	7	3	1	7	19	25	−6	28	9th–10th place playoff
6	Urawa Red Diamonds	18	7	0	4	7	25	18	+7	25	11th–12th place playoff
7	Yokohama F. Marinos	18	6	0	2	10	28	29	−1	20	13th–14th place playoff
8	Kashiwa Reysol	18	6	1	0	11	21	24	−3	20	15th–16th place playoff
9	Mito HollyHock	18	2	4	4	8	19	35	−16	18	17th–18th place playoff
10	JEF United Chiba	18	3	0	3	12	18	31	−13	12	19th–20th place playoff

Source: JLeague.co, J.League Data Site
Rules for classification: 1) Points; 2) Goal difference; 3) Goals scored; 4) Head-to-head.

=== West Region ===
Pos	Team	Pld	W	PKW	PKL	L	GF	GA	GD	Pts	Qualification
1	Vissel Kobe	18	9	2	4	3	27	21	+6	35	Final
2	Cerezo Osaka	18	7	4	2	5	26	19	+7	31	3rd–4th place playoff
3	Nagoya Grampus	18	8	2	3	5	31	28	+3	31	5th–6th place playoff
4	Sanfrecce Hiroshima	18	8	2	2	6	29	21	+8	30	7th–8th place playoff
5	Gamba Osaka	18	5	5	3	5	26	22	+4	28	9th–10th place playoff
6	Fagiano Okayama	18	6	2	4	6	24	25	−1	26	11th–12th place playoff
7	Shimizu S-Pulse	18	4	4	4	6	19	21	−2	24	13th–14th place playoff
8	Kyoto Sanga	18	5	3	2	8	19	26	−7	23	15th–16th place playoff
9	V-Varen Nagasaki	18	6	1	1	10	20	28	−8	21	17th–18th place playoff
10	Avispa Fukuoka	18	3	4	4	7	17	27	−10	21	19th–20th place playoff

Source: JLeague.co, J.League Data Site
Rules for classification: 1) Points; 2) Goal difference; 3) Goals scored; 4) Head-to-head.

== Results ==
=== East Region ===
Home \ Away	JEF	KSA	KWF	KSR	MCZ	MIH	TOK	TOV	URD	YFM
JEF United Chiba	—	0–2	0–0 (8–9 p)	2–1	0–2	1–1 (2–3 p)	1–2	3–2	0–2	2–3
Kashima Antlers	2–1	—	1–0	2–0	1–1 (4–2 p)	3–0	1–0	2–0	1–0	1–0
Kawasaki Frontale	2–1	0–2	—	5–3	1–1 (5–4 p)	2–2 (4–2 p)	1–2	1–0	3–2	0–5
Kashiwa Reysol	4–2	0–1	1–0	—	0–1	3–0	1–3	1–2	0–1	3–0
Machida Zelvia	2–1	0–3	1–1 (3–1 p)	1–0	—	2–2 (4–2 p)	0–3	0–0 (4–2 p)	1–0	2–0
Mito HollyHock	1–1 (5–3 p)	1–1 (4–2 p)	1–3	2–0	2–2 (3–4 p)	—	1–1 (5–6 p)	0–1	1–4	1–0
FC Tokyo	0–3	1–1 (5–4 p)	2–0	0–2	0–0 (2–4 p)	5–2	—	2–1	1–1 (5–3 p)	3–0
Tokyo Verdy	1–0	2–1	0–2	1–0	2–2 (4–3 p)	3–1	0–0 (4–2 p)	—	1–0	0–6
Urawa Red Diamonds	2–0	2–3	2–0	1–1 (2–4 p)	1–2	2–0	0–0 (9–10 p)	1–1 (1–3 p)	—	2–3
Yokohama F. Marinos	2–0	1–1 (4–5 p)	1–2	0–1	2–3	1–1 (1–3 p)	1–3	3–2	0–2	—

Source: J.League Data Site
Legend: Blue = home team win; Yellow = draw; Red = away team win.

=== West Region ===
Home \ Away	AFU	COS	FOK	GOS	KYS	NGR	SHI	SSP	VVN	VKO
Avispa Fukuoka	—	0–2	1–1 (6–5 p)	2–2 (14–13 p)	1–1 (5–4 p)	1–5	2–2 (4–3 p)	1–1 (4–5 p)	1–0	0–1
Cerezo Osaka	1–1 (4–3 p)	—	1–2	0–0 (4–5 p)	3–0	6–1	1–2	0–0 (4–2 p)	3–2	1–1 (6–5 p)
Fagiano Okayama	2–0	2–3	—	1–2	1–0	1–1 (5–4 p)	1–0	2–0	0–1	1–4
Gamba Osaka	1–2	0–1	2–2 (5–3 p)	—	2–0	0–0 (2–3 p)	0–1	2–2 (5–4 p)	3–2	5–0
Kyoto Sanga	2–0	1–2	5–1	1–1 (5–4 p)	—	1–1 (5–4 p)	0–4	1–2	1–0	1–1 (1–4 p)
Nagoya Grampus	2–2 (5–4 p)	3–0	1–1 (4–5 p)	2–1	3–0	—	2–1	1–0	1–3	0–3
Sanfrecce Hiroshima	0–1	2–1	1–1 (5–4 p)	2–0	1–2	4–2	—	1–1 (5–4 p)	2–0	1–1 (4–5 p)
Shimizu S-Pulse	1–1 (4–3 p)	1–1 (5–3 p)	1–1 (4–2 p)	1–2	1–1 (1–3 p)	0–2	3–1	—	1–2	1–0
V-Varen Nagasaki	1–0	1–0	2–1	1–1 (5–6 p)	1–2	1–2	1–3	0–3	—	2–2 (3–2 p)
Vissel Kobe	2–1	0–0 (2–4 p)	0–3	2–2 (3–5 p)	1–0	3–2	2–1	2–0	2–0	—

Source: J.League Data Site
Legend: Blue = home team win; Yellow = draw; Red = away team win.

== Play-off round ==
Team 1	Agg.	Team 2	1st leg	2nd leg
Vissel Kobe	5–2	Kashima Antlers	5–0	0–2
Cerezo Osaka	5–3	FC Tokyo	2–2	3–1
Nagoya Grampus	3–4	Machida Zelvia	2–2	1–2
Sanfrecce Hiroshima	3–1	Kawasaki Frontale	2–1	1–0
Gamba Osaka	5–3	Tokyo Verdy	1–1	4–2
Fagiano Okayama	3–1	Urawa Red Diamonds	1–1	2–0
Shimizu S-Pulse	1–4	Yokohama F. Marinos	1–1	0–3
Kyoto Sanga	3–6	Kashiwa Reysol	2–6	1–0
V-Varen Nagasaki	2–0	Mito HollyHock	1–0	1–0
Avispa Fukuoka	4–3	JEF United Chiba	2–2	2–1

== Season statistics ==
=== Top scorers ===
Rank	Player	Club	Goals
1	(Brazil) Léo Ceará	Kashima Antlers	10
1	(Japan) Kaina Tanimura	Yokohama F. Marinos	10
1	(Japan) Yuya Yamagishi	Nagoya Grampus	10
4	(Japan) Yudai Kimura	Nagoya Grampus	9
5	(Turkey) Deniz Hümmet	Gamba Osaka	8
5	(Brazil) Erik	Machida Zelvia	8
5	(Japan) Solomon Sakuragawa	Cerezo Osaka	8
8	(Brazil) Erison	Kawasaki Frontale	7
8	(South Korea) Oh Se-hun	Shimizu S-Pulse	7
8	(Japan) Harumi Minamino	Gamba Osaka	7
8	(Brazil) Matheus Jesus	V-Varen Nagasaki	7

=== Hat-tricks ===
Player	For	Against	Result	Date	Ref.
(Brazil) Erison	Kawasaki Frontale	Kashiwa Reysol	5–3 (H)	8 February 2026	
(Japan) Yuya Yamagishi	Nagoya Grampus	Kyoto Sanga	3–0 (H)	10 May 2026	
(Japan) Kyosuke Mochiyama	Kawasaki Frontale	Mito HollyHock	1–3 (A)	24 May 2026	
(Japan) Yuya Osako	Vissel Kobe	Kashima Antlers	5–0 (H)	30 May 2026	

== Awards ==
=== Monthly MVP ===
Month	Region	Player	Pos.	Club	Ref.
February	East	(Japan) Yuki Soma	FW	Machida Zelvia	
February	West	(Brazil) Marco Túlio	FW	Kyoto Sanga	
March	East	(Japan) Yuma Suzuki	FW	Kashima Antlers	
March	West	(South Korea) Oh Se-hun	FW	Shimizu S-Pulse	
April	East	(Japan) Keisuke Sato	FW	FC Tokyo	
April	West	(Japan) Tomoya Miki	MF	Avispa Fukuoka	
May	East	(Brazil) Léo Ceará	FW	Kashima Antlers	
May	West	(Japan) Shunta Tanaka	MF	Cerezo Osaka	

=== Goal of the Month ===
Month	Region	Player	Pos.	Club	Ref.
February	East	(Brazil) Léo Ceará	FW	Kashima Antlers	
February	West	(Japan) Ataru Esaka	MF	Fagiano Okayama	
March	East	(Brazil) Élber	FW	Kashima Antlers	
March	West	(Japan) Yuma Tsujioka	DF	Avispa Fukuoka	
April	East	(Japan) Koki Ando	MF	Mito HollyHock	
April	West	(Japan) Tomoya Miki	MF	Avispa Fukuoka	
May	East	(Japan) Motoki Nagakura	FW	FC Tokyo	
May	West	(Japan) Shosei Usui	FW	Avispa Fukuoka	

=== Young Player of the Month ===
Month	Region	Player	Pos.	Club	Ref.
February	East	(Japan) Junpei Hayakawa	MF	Urawa Red Diamonds	
February	West	(South Korea) Yoon Sung-jun	MF	Kyoto Sanga	
March	East	(Japan) Ryūnosuke Satō	MF	FC Tokyo	
March	West	(Japan) Kosei Ogura	MF	Fagiano Okayama	
April	East	(Japan) Koki Ando	MF	Mito HollyHock	
April	West	(Japan) Rui Araki	GK	Gamba Osaka	
May	East	(Japan) Makoto Himeno	MF	JEF United Chiba	
May	West	(Japan) Yumeki Yokoyama	MF	Cerezo Osaka	

=== Save of the Month ===
Month	Region	Player	Club	Ref.
February	East	(Japan) Tomoki Hayakawa	Kashima Antlers	
February	West	(Japan) Ayumu Ōhata (DF)	Cerezo Osaka	
March	East	(Germany) Svend Brodersen	Kawasaki Frontale	
March	West	(Japan) Togo Umeda	Shimizu S-Pulse	
April	East	(Japan) Shūsaku Nishikawa	Urawa Reds	
April	West	(Japan) Kosuke Nakamura	Cerezo Osaka	
May	East	(Japan) Ryosuke Kojima	Kashiwa Reysol	
May	West	(Japan) Shūichi Gonda	Vissel Kobe	

=== Annual awards ===
Award	Winner	Club
Best Player (East)	(Japan) Tomoki Hayakawa	Kashima Antlers
Best Player (West)	(Brazil) Matheus Thuler	Vissel Kobe
Best Young Player (East)	(Japan) Makoto Himeno	JEF United Chiba
Best Young Player (West)	(Japan) Nelson Ishiwatari	Cerezo Osaka
Best Goal (East)	(Japan) Miki Nagakura	FC Tokyo
Best Goal (West)	(Japan) Tomoya Miki	Avispa Fukuoka
Best Save (East)	(Japan) Tomoki Hayakawa	Kashima Antlers
Best Save (West)	(Japan) Ayumu Ohata	Cerezo Osaka
Top Scorer (East)	(Brazil) Léo Ceará	Kashima Antlers
Top Scorer (West)	(Japan) Yuya Yamagishi	Nagoya Grampus

Award	Winner	Club
Champion Manager	(Germany) Michael Skibbe	Vissel Kobe
Outstanding Manager (East)	(Japan) Toru Oniki	Kashima Antlers
Outstanding Manager (West)	(Australia) Arthur Papas	Cerezo Osaka

=== East Best XI ===
J1 100 Year Vision League East Best XI
Goalkeeper	(Japan) Tomoki Hayakawa (Kashima Antlers)			
Defenders	(Japan) Kimito Nono (Kashima Antlers)	(Japan) Naomichi Ueda (Kashima Antlers)	(South Korea) Kim Tae-hyun (Kashima Antlers)	(Japan) Sei Muroya (FC Tokyo)
Midfielders	(Japan) Kento Misao (Kashima Antlers)		(Japan) Koki Morita (Tokyo Verdy)	(Japan) Ryūnosuke Satō (FC Tokyo)
Forwards	(Japan) Kein Sato (FC Tokyo)		(Japan) Yuma Suzuki (Kashima Antlers)	(Brazil) Léo Ceará (Kashima Antlers)

=== West Best XI ===
J1 Regional Round West Best XI
Goalkeeper	(Japan) Kosuke Nakamura (Cerezo Osaka)			
Defenders	(Japan) Haruya Fujii (Nagoya Grampus)	(Brazil) Matheus Thuler (Vissel Kobe)	(Japan) Tsukasa Shiotani (Sanfrecce Hiroshima)	(Japan) Shuto Nakano (Sanfrecce Hiroshima)
Midfielders	(Japan) Katsuhiro Nakayama (Nagoya Grampus)		(Japan) Shunta Tanaka (Cerezo Osaka)	(Japan) Yosuke Ideguchi (Vissel Kobe)
Forwards	(Japan) Yudai Kimura (Nagoya Grampus)		(Japan) Yuya Yamagishi (Nagoya Grampus)	(Turkey) Deniz Hümmet (Gamba Osaka)

== See also ==
- J2–J3 100 Year Vision League
- 2026 JFL Cup
- 2026 Japanese Super Cup
- 2026–27 Emperor's Cup
- 2026–27 J.League Cup
- 2026–27 J1 League
