= Takatora Kondo =

Japanese footballer

Personal information
- Date of birth: 28 September 1997 (age 29)
- Place of birth: Imabari, Ehime, Japan
- Height: 1.63 m (5 ft 4 in)
- Position: Defender

Team information
- Current team: FC Imabari
- Number: 9

Youth career
- Namikata Club
- –2012: Kitago Junior High School
- 2013–2015: Nitta High School

College career
Years	Team	Apps	(Gls)
2016–2019	Ryutsu Keizai University		

Senior career*
Years	Team	Apps	(Gls)
2017–2019	RKU Dragons	74	(4)
2020–	FC Imabari	158	(18)
- * Club domestic league appearances and goals as of 17 August 2026

Takatora Kondo (近藤 高虎, Kondō Takatora; born 28 September 1997) is a Japanese footballer currently playing as a left-back for FC Imabari.

== Career statistics ==
=== Club ===
As of 10 November 2020.

Club	Season	League			National Cup		League Cup		Other		Total	
Club	Season	Division	Apps	Goals	Apps	Goals	Apps	Goals	Apps	Goals	Apps	Goals
RKU Dragons	2017	JFL	17	1	0	0	–		0	0	1	0
RKU Dragons	2018	JFL	30	0	2 (Note: Appearances in the Emperor's Cup)	0	–		0	0	32	0
RKU Dragons	2019	JFL	27	3	0	0	–		0	0	27	3
RKU Dragons	Total		74	4	2	0	0	0	0	0	76	4
FC Imabari	2020	J3 League	5	0	0	0	–		0	0	5	0
Career total			79	4	2	0	0	0	0	0	81	4
