= Ryota Ichihara =

Japanese footballer

Personal information
- Full name: Ryota Ichihara
- Date of birth: 25 May 1998 (age 28)
- Place of birth: Machida, Tokyo, Japan
- Height: 1.84 m (6 ft 0 in)
- Position: Defender

Team information
- Current team: FC Imabari
- Number: 4

Youth career
- Tokyo Machida Naruse SC
- Confiar Machida
- 2014–2016: Yokohama Soei High School

College career
Years	Team	Apps	(Gls)
2017–2020	Toyo University		

Senior career*
Years	Team	Apps	(Gls)
2021–	FC Imabari	98	(4)
2022–23	Fukuyama City FC (Loan)	2	(0)
Total		70	(2)
- * Club domestic league appearances and goals as of 1 January 2026

Ryota Ichihara (市原 亮太, Ichihara Ryota; born 25 May 1998) is a Japanese footballer currently playing as a defender for J2 League club FC Imabari.

== Club career ==
Ichihara made his professional debut in a 1–3 Emperor's Cup loss against Kyoto Sanga.

== Career statistics ==
=== Club ===
As of 9 June 2021.

Club	Season	League			National Cup		League Cup		Other		Total	
Club	Season	Division	Apps	Goals	Apps	Goals	Apps	Goals	Apps	Goals	Apps	Goals
FC Imabari	2021	J3 League	0	0	1 (Note: Appearances in the Emperor's Cup)	0	–		0	0	1	0
Career total			0	0	1	0	0	0	0	0	1	0

== Honours ==
Individual

- J3 League Best XI: 2024
