= Koki Ando (footballer) =

Japanese footballer (born 2007)

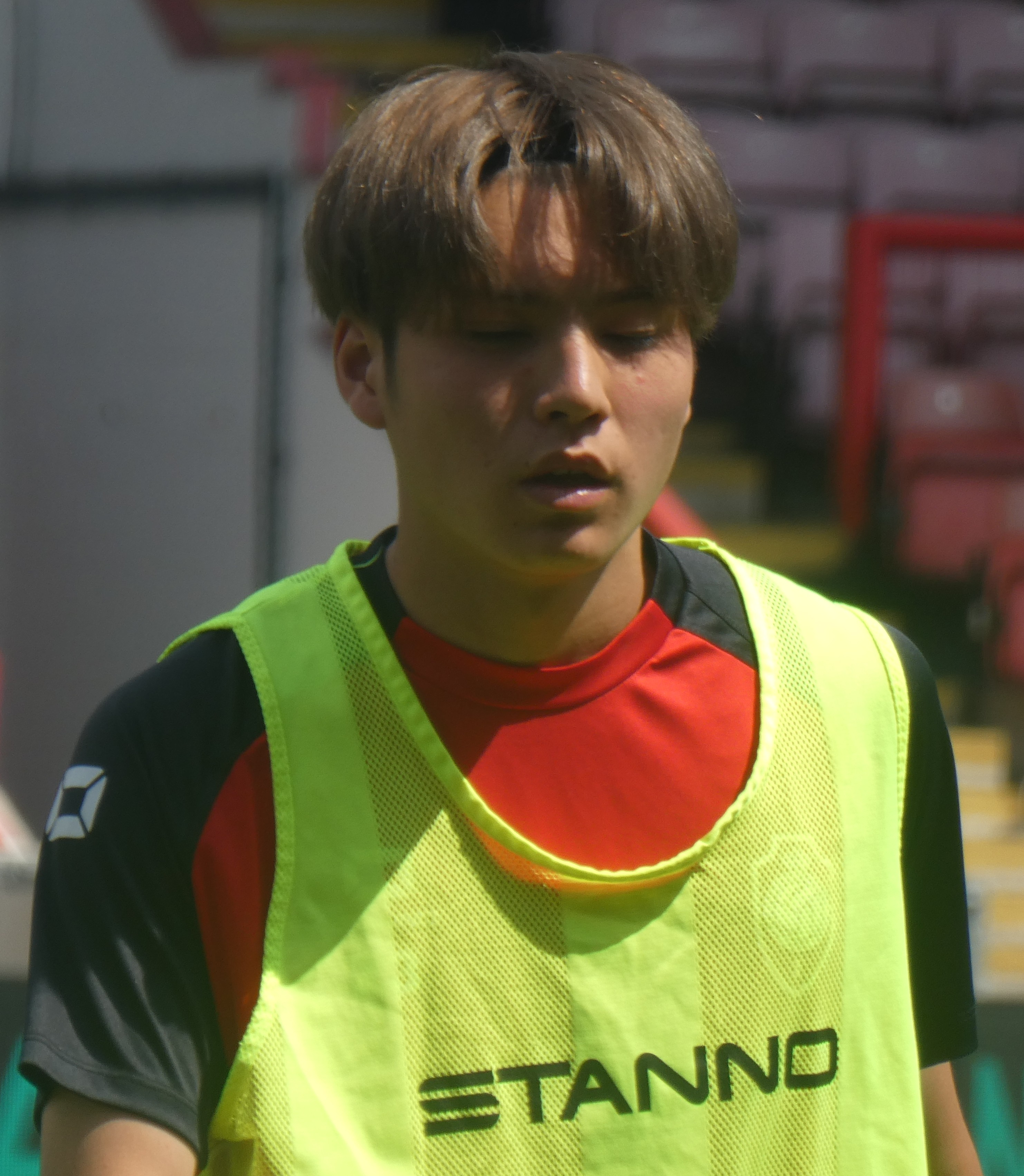

Personal information
- Date of birth: 22 September 2007 (age 19)
- Place of birth: Japan
- Height: 1.70 m (5 ft 7 in)
- Position: Winger

Team information
- Current team: Antwerp
- Number: 23

Youth career
- –2025: RKU Kashiwa High School

Senior career*
Years	Team	Apps	(Gls)
2026	Mito HollyHock	8	(2)
2026–	Young Reds	5	(1)
2026–	Antwerp	0	(0)
- * Club domestic league appearances and goals as of 11 October 2026

Koki Ando (安藤 晃希, Ando Koki; born 22 September 2007), is a Japanese professional footballer who plays as a winger for Antwerp.

== Early life ==
Ando was born on 22 September 2007 in Japan. A native of Tokyo, Japan, he has four younger sisters. Growing up, he attended Ryutsu Keizai University Kashiwa High School in Japan, where he played for the school's football team and wore the number ten jersey and helped them reach the final of the 2024 All Japan High School Soccer Tournament.

In 2025, he switched his football boots to Adidas Copa Icon while playing for them. After graduating from high school, he received offers from two Japanese second tier sides and considered attended university.

== Career ==
Ahead of the J1 100 Year Vision League, Ando signed for Japanese side Mito HollyHock, where he made eight league appearances and scored two goals. During the spring of 2026, he trained with German side Hannover 96, who the club had a partnership with. On 24 April 2026, he debuted and scored his first goal for Mito HollyHock during a 2–5 away loss to FC Tokyo in the league. On 29 April 2026, he made his second league appearance and scored his second goal for them during a 2–2 home draw with and 5–6 loss on penalties to Machida Zelvia in the league.

Following his stint there, he signed for Belgian side Antwerp the same year. The transfer received skepticism from some Japanese commentators, who felt the move to a European league was too early.

== Style of play ==
Ando plays as a winger, is right-footed, and has received comparisons to Japan international Kaoru Mitoma. Japanese news website Yahoo Japan wrote in 2026 that "his strength lies in his ability to break through using his speed. He uses his explosive speed to cut through the side and attacks the goal in an aggressive playing style".

== Career statistics ==
As of match played 11 October 2026

Appearances and goals by club, season and competition
Club	Season	League			National cup		Continental		Other		Total	
Club	Season	Division	Apps	Goals	Apps	Goals	Apps	Goals	Apps	Goals	Apps	Goals
Mito HollyHock	2026	J1 (100)	8	2	—		—		—		8	2
Young Reds	2026–27	Belgian Division 2	5	1	—		—		—		5	1
Antwerp	2026–27	Belgian Pro League	0	0	0	0	—		—		0	0
career total			13	3	0	0	0	0	0	0	13	3
