= Shunta Tanaka (footballer) =

Japanese footballer

Shunta Tanaka 田中 駿汰
Personal information
- Date of birth: 26 May 1997 (age 29)
- Place of birth: Osaka, Japan
- Height: 1.83 m (6 ft 0 in)
- Position: Centre back

Team information
- Current team: Cerezo Osaka
- Number: 10

Youth career
- 2004–2009: NSC Hokuto SC
- 2010–2012: Gamba Osaka
- 2013–2015: Riseisha High School

College career
Years	Team	Apps	(Gls)
2016–2019	Osaka University H&SS		

Senior career*
Years	Team	Apps	(Gls)
2020–2023	Hokkaido Consadole Sapporo	134	(8)
2024–	Cerezo Osaka	87	(10)
Total		221	(18)

International career^{‡}
2019–	Japan U23	6	(0)
2019–	Japan	1	(0)
- * Club domestic league appearances and goals as of 10 August 2026 ‡ National team caps and goals as of 17:04, 24 April 2020 (UTC)

Shunta Tanaka (田中 駿汰, Tanaka Shunta; born 26 May 1997) is a Japanese footballer currently playing as a centre back for J1 League club Cerezo Osaka.

== Club career ==
Tanaka was born in Osaka Prefecture on May 26, 1997. In May 2019, when he was an Osaka University of Health and Sport Sciences student, J1 League club Hokkaido Consadole Sapporo announced that signed a contract with Tanaka from the 2020 season.

In December 2023, it was announced that Tanaka would be moving to J1 League club Cerezo Osaka ahead of the 2024 season.

== National team career ==
In December 2019, when Tanaka was an Osaka University of Health and Sport Sciences student, he was selected Japan national team for 2019 EAFF E-1 Football Championship. At this tournament, he debuted as center back against Hong Kong on December 14.

== Career statistics ==
=== Club ===
As of 10 June 2024

Appearances and goals by club, season and competition
Club	Season	League			National Cup		League Cup		Other		Total	
Club	Season	Division	Apps	Goals	Apps	Goals	Apps	Goals	Apps	Goals	Apps	Goals
Japan			League		Emperor's Cup		J. League Cup		Other		Total	
Hokkaido Consadole Sapporo	2020	J1 League	31	2	0	0	3	0	–		34	2
Hokkaido Consadole Sapporo	2021	J1 League	37	1	1	0	8	1	–		46	2
Hokkaido Consadole Sapporo	2022	J1 League	32	1	0	0	4	1	–		36	2
Hokkaido Consadole Sapporo	2023	J1 League	34	4	2	0	7	1	–		43	5
Hokkaido Consadole Sapporo	Total		134	8	3	0	22	3	0	0	159	11
Cerezo Osaka	2024	J1 League	17	2	0	0	1	0	0	0	18	2
Career total			151	10	3	0	23	3	0	0	177	13

=== National team ===
As of matches played 14 December 2019.

Japan national team
Year	Apps	Goals
2019	1	0
Total	1	0

== Honours ==
Individual

- J1 100 Year Vision League Regional Round West Best Eleven: 2026
