= Koki Morita =

Japanese footballer

Koki Morita 森田 晃樹
Personal information
- Full name: Koki Morita
- Date of birth: August 8, 2000 (age 26)
- Place of birth: Toshima-ku, Tokyo, Japan
- Height: 1.67 m (5 ft 5 1/2 in)
- Position: Midfielder

Team information
- Current team: Tokyo Verdy
- Number: 10

Youth career
- 2008–2018: Tokyo Verdy

Senior career*
Years	Team	Apps	(Gls)
2018–	Tokyo Verdy	241	(11)
- * Club domestic league appearances and goals as of 8 August 2026

Koki Morita (森田 晃樹, Morita Kōki; born August 8, 2000) is a Japanese football player who plays for Tokyo Verdy.

== Playing career ==
Morita was born in Tokyo on August 8, 2000. He joined the J2 League club Tokyo Verdy from the youth team in 2018. On August 22, 2018, he debuted against Urawa Red Diamonds in Emperor's Cup.

For the 2023 season, he was appointed the club's new captain.

== Career statistics ==
Updated to 8 December 2024.

Appearances and goals by club, season and competition
Club	Season	League			Emperor's Cup		J.League Cup		Other		Total	
Club	Season	Division	Apps	Goals	Apps	Goals	Apps	Goals	Apps	Goals	Apps	Goals
Tokyo Verdy	2018	J2 League	0	0	1	0	–		–		1	0
Tokyo Verdy	2019	J2 League	24	3	1	0	–		–		25	3
Tokyo Verdy	2020	J2 League	39	0	–		–		–		39	0
Tokyo Verdy	2021	J2 League	18	1	0	0	–		–		18	1
Tokyo Verdy	2022	J2 League	34	4	4	0	–		–		38	4
Tokyo Verdy	2023	J2 League	40	1	0	0	–		2	1	42	2
Tokyo Verdy	2024	J1 League	33	1	0	0	0	0	–		33	1
Total			188	10	6	0	0	0	2	1	196	11

== Honours ==
Individual

- J2 League Best XI: 2023
- J1 100 Year Vision League Regional Round East Best Eleven: 2026
