= Edigar Junio =

Brazilian footballer (born 1991)

Personal information
- Full name: Edigar Junio Teixeira Lima
- Date of birth: 6 May 1991 (age 35)
- Place of birth: Gama, Federal District, Brazil
- Height: 1.74 m (5 ft 8 1/2 in)
- Position: Forward

Team information
- Current team: FC Imabari
- Number: 10

Youth career
- PSTC
- 2008–2011: Atlético Paranaense

Senior career*
Years	Team	Apps	(Gls)
2011–2015	Atlético Paranaense	23	(4)
2013–2014	→ Joinville (loan)	63	(19)
2015	→ Joinville (loan)	20	(1)
2016–2020	Bahia	80	(26)
2019	→ Yokohama F. Marinos (loan)	16	(11)
2020–2025	V-Varen Nagasaki	142	(54)
2026–	FC Imabari	19	(6)
- * Club domestic league appearances and goals as of 17 August 2026

Edigar Junio Teixeira Lima (born 6 May 1991), known as Edigar Junio, is a Brazilian footballer who plays as a forward for Japanese club FC Imabari.

== Club career ==
Edigar Junio Teixeira Lima was born in Gama, Federal District, joined Atlético Paranaense's youth setup in 2008, after starting it out at Paraná Soccer Technical Center. He made his first team – and Série A –debut on 30 June 2011, coming on as a second half substitute for Paulo Baier and scoring his side's only in a 1–3 away loss against Fluminense.

On 13 July, Edigar Junio renewed his link with Furacão until 2016. He subsequently lost his place in the main squad, being assigned to the under-23's, which were playing in Campeonato Paranaense.

On 10 June 2013, Edigar Junio was loaned to Série B's Joinville, along with teammate Bruno Costa. He remained at JEC in 2014, and scored 12 goals as his side was crowned champions.

In January 2015, Edigar Junio returned to Atlético, being assigned in the main squad.

== Career statistics ==
As of 4 November 2023

Club	Season	League			State League		Cup		League Cup		Continental		Other		Total	
Club	Season	Division	Apps	Goals	Apps	Goals	Apps	Goals	Apps	Goals	Apps	Goals	Apps	Goals	Apps	Goals
Atlético Paranaense	2011	Série A	12	3	—		—		—		1 (Note: Appearance in Copa Sudamericana)	0	—		13	3
Atlético Paranaense	2012	Série B	6	0	10 (Note: Appearance in Campeonato Paranaense)	3	6	2	—		—		—		22	5
Atlético Paranaense	2013	Série A	—		13	3	—		—		—		—		13	3
Atlético Paranaense	2015	Série A	5	1	9	1	2	0	—		—		—		16	2
Atlético Paranaense	Total		23	4	32	7	8	2	—		1	0	—		64	13
Joinville (loan)	2013	Série B	26	7	—		—		—		—		—		26	7
Joinville (loan)	2014	Série B	37	12	16 (Note: Appearance in Campeonato Catarinense)	4	—		—		—		—		53	16
Joinville (loan)	Total		63	19	16	4	—		—		—		—		79	23
Joinville (loan)	2015	Série A	20	1	—		—		—		—		—		20	1
Bahia	2016	Série B	27	8	11 (Note: Appearance in Campeonato Baiano)	5	1	1	—		—		8 (Note: Appearance in Copa do Nordeste)	2	47	16
Bahia	2017	Série A	26	12	7	0	—		—		—		7	3	40	15
Bahia	2018	Série A	27	6	9	1	4	1	—		6	1	8	4	54	13
Bahia	Total		80	26	27	6	5	2	—		6	1	23	9	141	44
Yokohama F. Marinos (loan)	2019	J1 League	16	11	—		0	0	0	0	—		—		16	11
Yokohama F. Marinos (loan)	2020	J1 League	16	3	—		—		1	0	0	0	1 (Note: Appearance in Japanese Super Cup)	0	18	3
Yokohama F. Marinos (loan)	Total		32	14	—		0	0	1	0	0	0	1	0	34	14
V-Varen Nagasaki (loan)	2020	J2 League	11	5	—		—		—		—		—		11	5
V-Varen Nagasaki	2021	J2 League	32	15	—		0	0	—		—		—		32	15
V-Varen Nagasaki	2022	J2 League	41	12	—		0	0	—		—		—		41	12
V-Varen Nagasaki	2023	J2 League	10	2	—		1	0	—		—		—		11	2
V-Varen Nagasaki	Total		94	34	—		1	0	—		—		—		95	34
Career total			312	98	75	17	14	2	1	0	7	1	24	9	433	127

== Honours ==
Joinville

- Campeonato Brasileiro Série B: 2014

Bahia

- Copa do Nordeste: 2017
- Campeonato Baiano: 2018

Yokohama F. Marinos

- J1 League: 2019
