= Tomoya Miki =

Japanese footballer (born 1998)

Tomoya Miki 見木 友哉
Personal information
- Full name: Tomoya Miki
- Date of birth: 28 March 1998 (age 28)
- Place of birth: Fujisawa, Kanagawa, Japan
- Height: 1.85 m (6 ft 1 in)
- Position: Midfielder

Team information
- Current team: Avispa Fukuoka
- Number: 11

Youth career
- FC Shonan Tsujido
- Shonan Bellmare
- Yokohama FC Tsurumi
- 2013–2015: Yokogawa Musashino FC

College career
Years	Team	Apps	(Gls)
2016–2019	Kanto Gakuin University		

Senior career*
Years	Team	Apps	(Gls)
2019–2023	JEF United Chiba	165	(30)
2024	Tokyo Verdy	37	(4)
2025–	Avispa Fukuoka	47	(8)
- * Club domestic league appearances and goals as of 12 August 2026

Tomoya Miki (見木 友哉, Miki Tomoya; born 28 March 1998) is a Japanese professional footballer who plays as a midfielder for J1 League club Avispa Fukuoka.

== Career ==
On 21 June 2019, Miki was announced at JEF United Chiba as a specially designated player for the 2019 season. He was also promoted to the first team from the 2020 season. On 17 July 2021, he won the J2 Goal of the Month award for his goal against Zweigen Kanazawa in the 45th+3rd minute.

On 14 December 2024, Miki was announced at Tokyo Verdy.

On 16 December 2024, Miki was announced at Avispa Fukuoka.

== Career statistics ==
=== Club ===
As of end of 2024 season

Appearances and goals by club, season and competition
Club	Season	League			National Cup		League Cup		Other		Total	
Club	Season	Division	Apps	Goals	Apps	Goals	Apps	Goals	Apps	Goals	Apps	Goals
Japan			League		Emperor's Cup		J. League Cup		Other		Total	
JEF United Chiba	2019	J2 League	9	1	0	0	–		–		9	1
JEF United Chiba	2020	J2 League	33	1	0	0	–		–		33	1
JEF United Chiba	2021	J2 League	42	14	1	1	–		–		43	15
JEF United Chiba	2022	J2 League	40	7	1	0	–		–		41	7
JEF United Chiba	2023	J2 League	41	7	1	0	–		1 (Note: Appearance in the J1/J2 play-offs)	0	43	7
JEF United Chiba	Total		165	30	3	1	0	0	1	0	169	31
Tokyo Verdy	2024	J1 League	37	4	2	0	1	2	–		40	6
Avispa Fukuoka	2025	J1 League	0	0	0	0	0	0	–		0	0
Career total			202	34	5	1	1	2	1	0	209	37
