= Arigato Service Dream Stadium =

Japanese football stadium

- Yumesuta
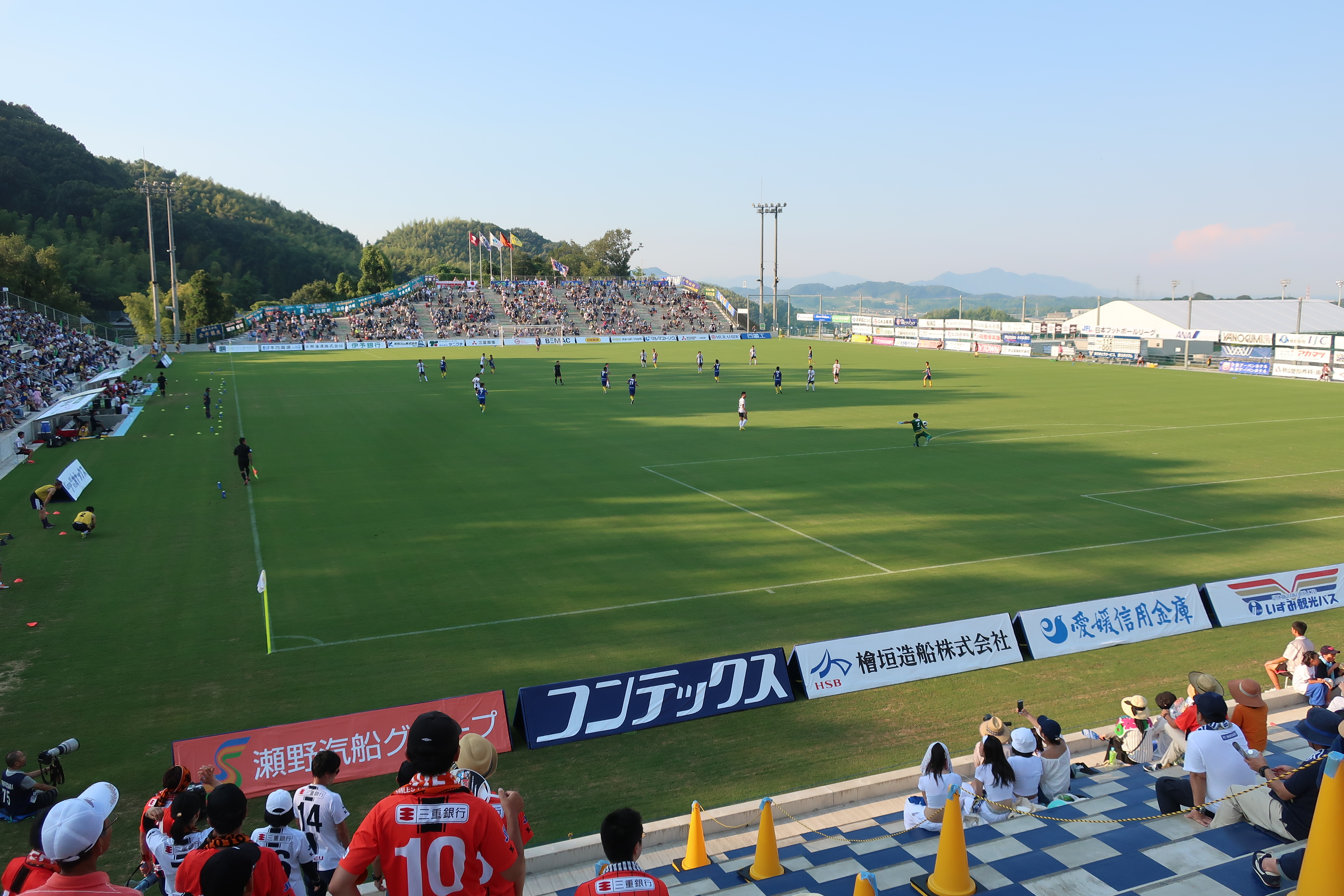

- Location within Ehime Prefecture Location within Japan
- Interactive map of Arigato Service Dream Stadium
- Location: Imabari, Ehime
- Coordinates: 34°2′27.8″N 132°57′21.9″E
- Capacity: 5,030
- Surface: Grass
- Record attendance: 5,241

Construction
- Opened: August 2017
- Cost: ¥300 million

Tenant
- FC Imabari (2017–2022)

Arigato Service Dream Stadium is a football ground in Imabari, Ehime, Japan. It is the home ground of FC Imabari until 2022.

== History ==
From 2023, FC Imabari move to new stadium in Satoyama Stadium officially opening on 29 January 2023.

== Gallery ==
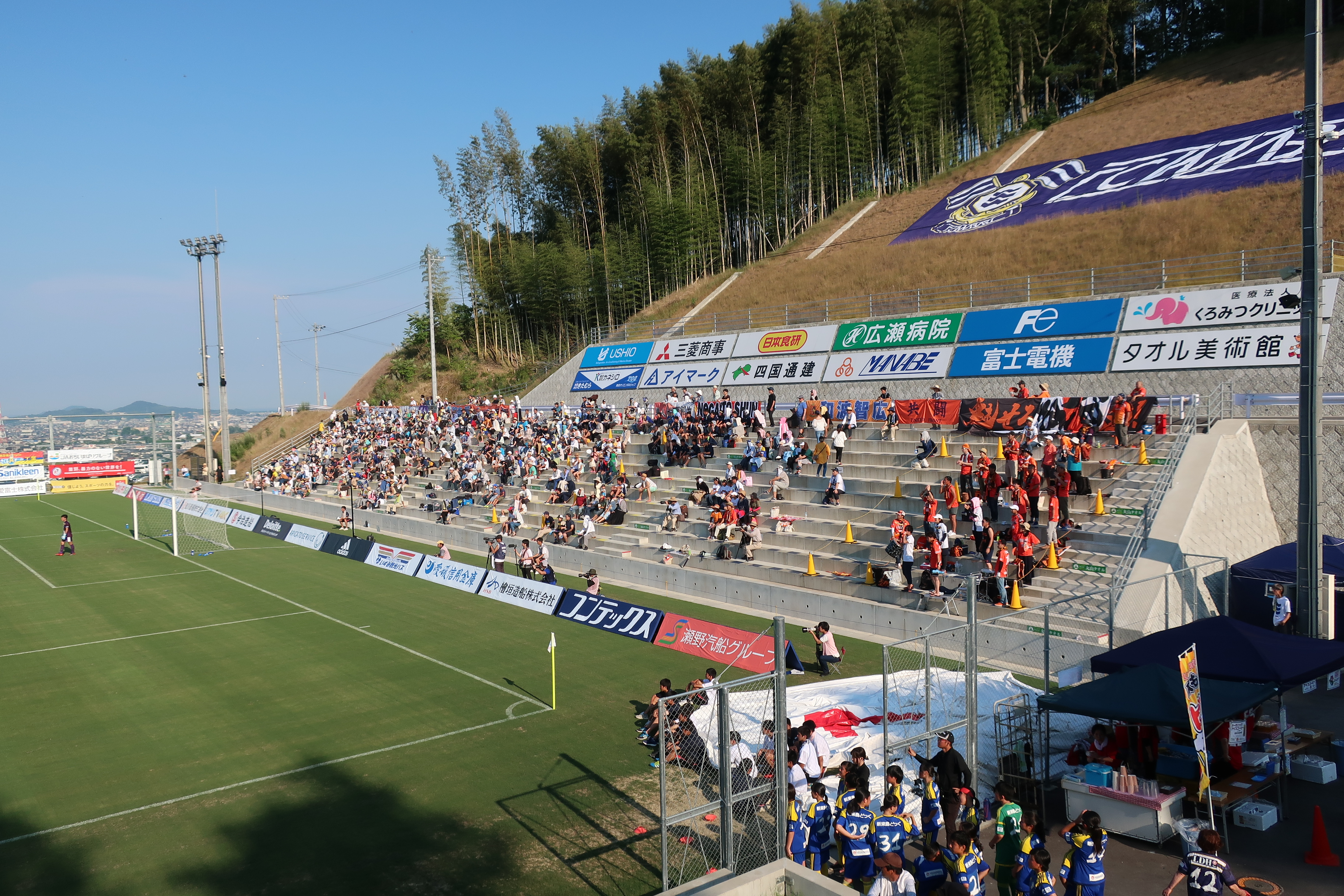

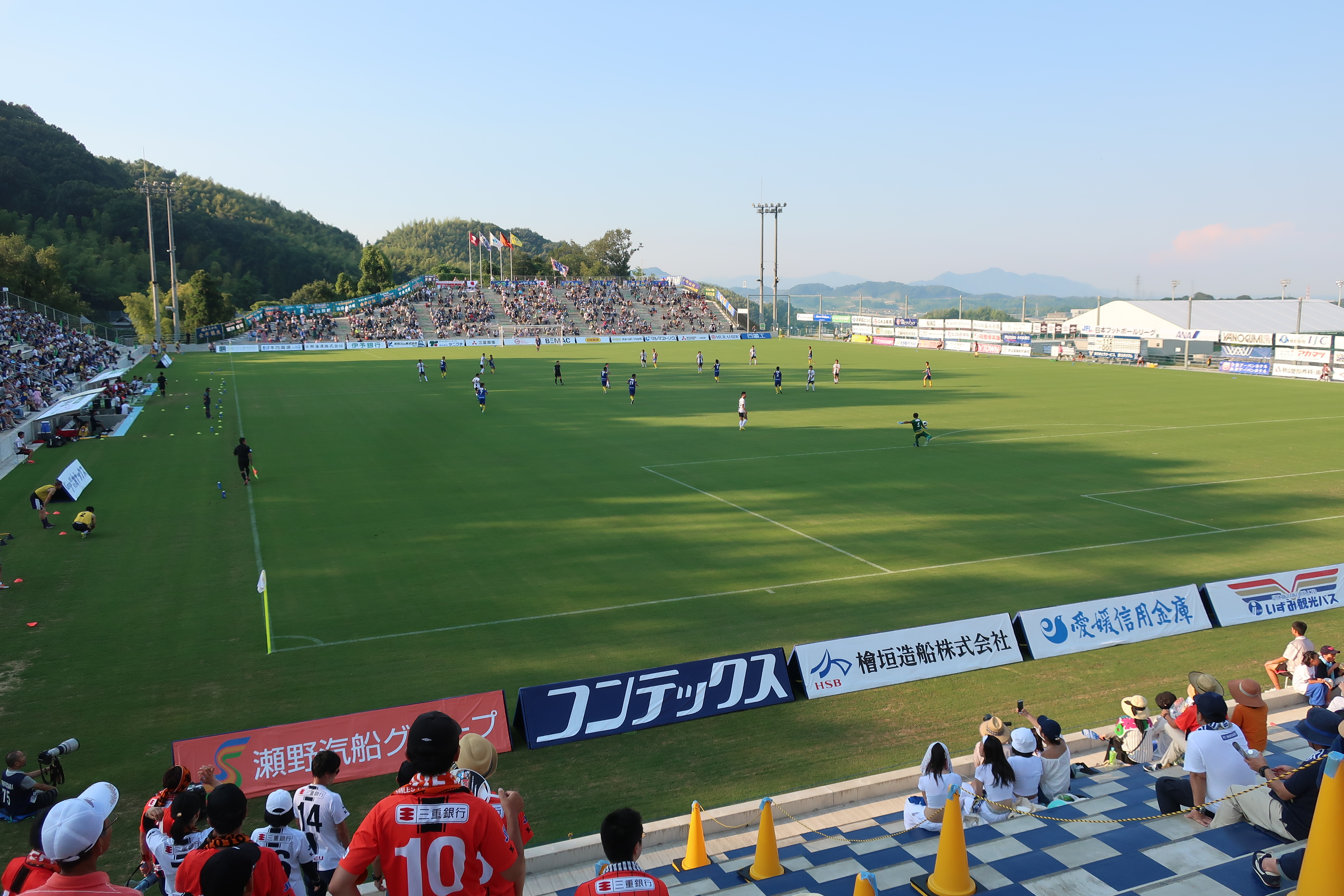
