= Taiga Son =

Japanese footballer

Personal information
- Date of birth: 13 June 1999 (age 27)
- Place of birth: Tokyo, Japan
- Height: 1.87 m (6 ft 2 in)
- Position: Centre-back

Team information
- Current team: FC Imabari
- Number: 3

Youth career
- 2015–2017: Shochi Fukaya High School

College career
Years	Team	Apps	(Gls)
2018–2021	Rissho University		

Senior career*
Years	Team	Apps	(Gls)
2021–2023	Sagan Tosu	2	(0)
2022–2023	→ Zweigen Kanazawa (loan)	31	(0)
2024–2025	Ventforet Kofu	52	(4)
2026–	FC Imabari	16	(0)
- * Club domestic league appearances and goals as of 1 January 2026

Taiga Son (Korean: 손대하; Hanja: 孫大河; born 13 June 1999) is a Japanese professional footballer who plays as a centre-back for J2 League club FC Imabari.

== Career ==
Son begin first youth career with Shochi Fukaya High School, when he entered to Rissho University in 2018. He was graduation from university in 2021.

On 6 May 2021, Son begin first professional career with Sagan Tosu from 2022 season.

On 14 June 2022, Son was loaned out to J2 club, Zweigen Kanazawa for during 2022 season.

Son signed with FC Imabari prior to the 2026 season.

== Personal life ==
His paternal great-grandfather is Korean, and his grandson himself was born and raised in Japan, but his nationality was Korean. As of 2026, J.League official records indicate his nationality as Japanese.

== Career statistics ==
As of the end 2022 season.

Appearances and goals by club, season and competition
Club	Season	League			Emperor's Cup		J. League Cup		Other		Total	
Club	Season	Division	Apps	Goals	Apps	Goals	Apps	Goals	Apps	Goals	Apps	Goals
Sagan Tosu	2021	J1 League	0	0	0	0	1	0	—		1	0
Sagan Tosu	2022	J1 League	0	0	0	0	1	—		0	1	0
Sagan Tosu	Total		0	0	0	0	2	0	0	0	2	0
Zweigen Kanazawa (loan)	2022	J2 League	16	0	—		—		—		16	0
Career total			16	0	0	0	2	0	0	0	18	0
