= Keiji Kuraishi =

Japanese football manager

Keiji Kuraishi 倉石 圭二
Personal information
- Full name: Keiji Kuraishi
- Date of birth: 26 June 1982 (age 44)
- Place of birth: Kadogawa, Miyazaki Prefecture, Japan
- Position: Defender

Team information
- Current team: Vanraure Hachinohe (manager)

Senior career*
Years	Team	Apps	(Gls)
2005–2009	Honda Lock SC	121	(4)

Managerial career
- 2018–2020: Tegevajaro Miyazaki
- 2025–2026: FC Imabari
- 2026–: Vanraure Hachinohe
- * Club domestic league appearances and goals

Keiji Kuraishi (倉石 圭二, Kuraishi Keiji; born 26 June 1982) is a Japanese professional football manager and former footballer who is manager of J2 League club Vanraure Hachinohe.

== Early life and playing career ==
Kuraishi was born in Kadogawa, Miyazaki Prefecture. He began playing football at the age of six, influenced by his older brother. He left home to attend Kunimi Junior High School and became a regular starter at wingback in his third year. Playing alongside future Japan international forward Yoshito Okubo, he was part of the team that secured a treble in the 2000–01 season, winning the All Japan High School Athletic Meet, the National Athletic Meet, and the All Japan High School Soccer Tournament. Following his graduation, Kuraishi attended Senshu University before embarking on his playing career with JFL club Honda Lock SC, where he played from 2005 to 2009. He made 130 appearances for the club, scoring 5 goals.

== Coaching career ==
Kuraishi began his coaching career in 2009 with Miyazaki Nihon University High School, where he earned his A-Class coaching qualification and stayed until 2016. In April 2017, he was appointed as a coach of Tegevajaro Miyazaki.

Kuraishi left Tegevajaro Miyazaki at the end of the 2021 season, before joining J2 League Yokohama FC for the 2022 season, helping the club gain promotion to the J1 League. He continued in his role for the 2023 season, but Yokohama FC were relegated back to the J2 League. Whilst at Yokohama FC, Kuraishi attained his S-Class coaching license.

Ahead of the 2024 season, Kuraishi left Yokohama FC to become a coach at J2 League club V-Varen Nagasaki.

== Managerial career ==
In June 2018, following the dismissal of manager Nobuhiro Ishizaki, Kuraishi was promoted and appointed as manager of Tegevajaro Miyazaki in the JFL. Despite losing his first game 3–0 to Yokogawa Musashino FC, he went on to lead them on an 8-game unbeaten run in the league and eventually finished in 12th position.

In the 2020 season, Kuraishi led Tegevajaro Miyazaki to promotion from the JFL following a second-placed finish. However, as he did not possess an S-Class license required to manage a J.League club, he stepped down from the managerial position and reverted to a coaching role, with Naruyuki Naito appointed as manager. Kuraishi remained with the club as a coach for the 2021 season.

In December 2024, it was announced that Kuraishi would become manager of newly promoted J2 League club FC Imabari ahead of the 2025 season. In April 2026, during the J2/J3 100 Year Vision League, Kuraishi decided to step down from his position following a string of bad results.

In June 2026, Kuraishi became manager of J2 League club Vanraure Hachinohe ahead of the 2026–27 season.

== Career statistics ==
Appearances and goals by club, season and competition
Club	Season	League			Emperor's Cup		Total	
Club	Season	Division	Apps	Goals	Apps	Goals	Apps	Goals
Honda Lock SC	2005	JFL	28	1	4	1	32	2
Honda Lock SC	2006	JFL	28	1	0	0	28	1
Honda Lock SC	2007	Regional Leagues	17	2	1	0	18	2
Honda Lock SC	2008	Regional Leagues	17	0	1	0	18	0
Honda Lock SC	2009	JFL	31	0	3	0	34	0
Career total			121	4	9	1	130	5

== Managerial statistics ==
As of end of 2025 season

Managerial record by team and tenure
Team	Nat.	From	To	Record								Ref.
Team	Nat.	From	To	G	W	D	L	GF	GA	GD	Win %	Ref.
Tegevajaro Miyazaki	(Japan)	21 June 2018	24 January 2021	61	25	17	19	87	77	+10	40.98	
FC Imabari	(Japan)	6 December 2024	Present	41	14	14	13	51	53	−2	34.15	
Career total				102	39	31	32	138	130	+8	38.24	

== Personal life ==
In 2018, Kuraishi married his partner Mayo and in November 2018, their daughter Rino was born.
