= Takafumi Yamada =

Japanese footballer

Personal information
- Full name: Takafumi Yamada
- Date of birth: 19 April 1992 (age 34)
- Place of birth: Matsuyama, Ehime, Japan
- Height: 1.74 m (5 ft 9 in)
- Position: Midfielder

Team information
- Current team: FC Imabari
- Number: 7

Youth career
- –2004: Teijin SS
- 2005–2007: Nissho Gakuen Junior High School
- 2008–2010: Nissho Gakuen High School

College career
Years	Team	Apps	(Gls)
2011–2014	Osaka University H&SS		

Senior career*
Years	Team	Apps	(Gls)
2015–2017	Honda Lock SC	86	(7)
2018–	FC Imabari	242	(13)
- * Club domestic league appearances and goals as of 17 August 2026

Takafumi Yamada (山田 貴文, Yamada Takafumi; born 19 April 1992) is a Japanese footballer currently playing as a midfielder for FC Imabari.

== Career statistics ==
=== Club ===
As of 28 March 2021.

Club	Season	League			National Cup		League Cup		Other		Total	
Club	Season	Division	Apps	Goals	Apps	Goals	Apps	Goals	Apps	Goals	Apps	Goals
Honda Lock SC	2015	JFL	29	1	0	0	–		0	0	29	1
Honda Lock SC	2016	JFL	28	5	1 (Note: Appearance(s) in Emperor's Cup)	0	–		0	0	29	5
Honda Lock SC	2017	JFL	29	1	0	0	–		0	0	29	1
Honda Lock SC	Total		86	7	1	0	0	0	0	0	87	7
FC Imabari	2018	JFL	28	0	2	1	–		0	0	30	0
FC Imabari	2019	JFL	24	1	0	0	–		0	0	24	1
FC Imabari	2020	J3 League	30	1	0	0	–		0	0	30	1
FC Imabari	2021	J3 League	3	0	0	0	–		0	0	3	0
FC Imabari	Total		85	2	2	0	0	0	0	0	87	2
Career total			171	9	3	0	0	0	0	0	174	9
