= Koji Okumura =

Japanese footballer

Personal information
- Date of birth: 29 July 1998 (age 28)
- Place of birth: Saitama, Japan
- Height: 1.75 m (5 ft 9 in)
- Position: Midfielder

Team information
- Current team: Tegevajaro Miyazaki
- Number: 47

Youth career
- Minamiurawa SSS
- 2011–2013: Shirahata Junior High School
- 2014–2016: Bunan High School

College career
Years	Team	Apps	(Gls)
2017–2020	Takushoku University		

Senior career*
Years	Team	Apps	(Gls)
2021–2023	Thespakusatsu Gunma	38	(2)
2024	YSCC Yokohama	37	(8)
2025–	Tegevajaro Miyazaki	57	(7)
- * Club domestic league appearances and goals as of 16 August 2026

Koji Okumura (奥村 晃司, Okumura Koji; born 29 July 1998) is a Japanese footballer currently playing as a midfielder for Tegevajaro Miyazaki.

== Career statistics ==
As of 3 March 2021.

Club	Season	League			National Cup		League Cup		Other		Total	
Club	Season	Division	Apps	Goals	Apps	Goals	Apps	Goals	Apps	Goals	Apps	Goals
Thespakusatsu Gunma	2021	J2 League	1	0	0	0	0	0	0	0	1	0
Career total			1	0	0	0	0	0	0	0	1	0
