= FC Imabari =

Japanese football club

FC Imabari FC今治
- Full name: Football Club Imabari
- Founded: 1976; 50 years ago
- Ground: ASICS Satoyama Stadium (Imabari, Ehime)
- Capacity: 5,316
- Chairman: Takeshi Okada
- Manager: Yoshikiyo Kuboyama
- League: J2 League
- 2025: J2 League, 11th of 20
- Website: fcimabari.com
Home colours	Away colours

FC Imabari (FC今治, Efu Shī Imabari) is a Japanese football club based in Imabari, Ehime Prefecture. They currently play in the J2 League after promotion from J3 League in 2024, Japan's second tier of professional football.

== History ==
The club was founded in 1976 and were promoted to the Shikoku Football League in 2001.

From 2009 to 2011, they were owned by Ehime FC as their reserve team, Ehime FC Shimanami. In 2014, the majority of FC Imabari was bought by former Japan national team coach Takeshi Okada.

In February 2016, the club made another step forward towards the J. League, as JFA recognised J.League Hundred Year Vision clubs. In November, they won the Regional Promotion Series and were promoted to the Japan Football League. During their debut season on the JFL, they opened their new stadium and acquired a J3 League license from the 2018 season.

In 2019, after finishing on third place at the JFL, FC Imabari were promoted to Japan's professional league system, becoming a professional club, as they were promoted to the J3 for the first time in their history.

FC Imabari acquired a J2 license in 2021, meaning that the club can be promoted to the J2 League once they are able to finish the season in the promotion zone.

On 10 November 2024, FC Imabari secured promotion to the J2 League for the first time in their history, ending a five year stint in the third tier.

On 25 September 2025, FC Imabari announced that it had been granted a J1 League license, making the club eligible for promotion to the J1 League should they finish the season in a promotion position.

== Stadium ==
=== Arigato Service Dream Stadium (2017–2022) ===
FC Imabari played their J3 League matches on the Arigato Service Dream Stadium from 2017 to 2022. They played their final league match there (as their home stadium) at the club's last home match of the 2022 season. Imabari played this match against Nagano Parceiro on 13 November 2022, at the 33rd Matchweek, with the match ending tied by 3–3.

=== ASICS Satoyama Stadium (2023–) ===
From 2023, Imabari decided to change its home stadium to their newly built ASICS Satoyama Stadium. The opening ceremony was decided to be held on 29 January 2023. Satoyama Stadium was opened to the public on 29 January 2023, with a charity match contested between an XI of J-League Legends against FC Imabari U-18 and Ladies, respectively. On 5 March of the same year, FC Imabari played their first match of the season at their new stadium against Fukushima United in the J3 League, which ended in a 1–0 win for Imabari.

== League and cup records ==
Champions	Runners-up	Third place	Promoted	Relegated

League													J. League Cup	Emperor's Cup	Shakaijin Cup
Season	Division	Tier	Pos	P	W	D	L	F	A	GD	Pts	Attendance/G	J. League Cup	Emperor's Cup	Shakaijin Cup
2011	Shikoku Soccer; League	4	1st	14	13	1	0	52	4	48	34		Not eligible	1st round	3rd place
2012	Shikoku Soccer; League	4	1st	14	11	2	1	44	10	34	34		Not eligible	3rd round	1st round
2013	Shikoku Soccer; League	4	1st	14	13	1	0	72	7	65	40		Not eligible	2nd round	1st round
2014	Shikoku Soccer; League	5	3rd	14	11	1	2	78	16	62	34		Not eligible	1st round	Did not play
2015	Shikoku Soccer; League	5	1st	14	12	1	1	58	5	53	37		Not eligible	1st round	2nd round
2016	Shikoku Soccer; League	5	1st	14	13	0	1	54	7	47	39		Not eligible	1st round	2nd round
2017	JFL	4	6th	30	12	12	6	54	36	18	48	2,182	Not eligible	2nd round	Not eligible
2018	JFL	4	5th	30	14	7	9	63	32	31	49	3,081	Not eligible	2nd round	Not eligible
2019	JFL	4	3rd	30	13	12	5	41	26	15	51	3,101	Not eligible	Did not qualify	Not eligible
2020 †	J3	3	7th	34	15	10	9	39	27	12	55	1,355	Not eligible	Did not qualify	Not eligible
2021 †	J3	3	11th	28	7	9	12	34	33	1	30	1,660	Not eligible	2nd round	Not eligible
2022	J3	3	5th	34	18	6	10	55	40	15	60	2,320	Not eligible	1st round	Not eligible
2023	J3	3	4th	38	16	11	11	54	42	12	59	3,711	Not eligible	2nd round	Not eligible
2024	J3	3	2nd	38	22	7	9	62	38	24	73	3,786	2nd round	1st round	Not eligible
2025	J2	2	11th	38	13	14	11	46	46	0	53	4,800	2nd round	1st round	Not eligible
2026	J2	2	35th	18	5	4	9	14	18	-4	20	4,541	N/A		Not eligible
2026-27	J2	2	TBD	38									TBD	TBD	Not eligible

Key

- Pos. = Position in league; P = Games played; W = Games won; D = Games drawn; L = Games lost; F = Goals scored; A = Goals conceded; GD = Goals difference; Pts = Points gained
- Attendance/G = Average home league attendance
- † 2020 & 2021 seasons attendances reduced by COVID-19 worldwide pandemic.
- Source: J.League Data Site

== Honours ==
FC Imabari Honours
Honour	No.	Years
Ehime Prefectural Football Championship (and Emperor's Cup Ehime Prefectural Qualifiers)	11	2009, 2010, 2011, 2012, 2013, 2014, 2015, 2016, 2017, 2018, 2021
Shikoku Soccer League	5	2011, 2012, 2013, 2015, 2016
Regional League Promotion Series	1	2016

== Players ==
=== Current squad ===
As of 1 August 2026. Note: Flags indicate national team as defined under FIFA eligibility rules; some limited exceptions apply. Players may hold more than one non-FIFA nationality.

No.	Pos.	Nation	Player
1	GK	JPN	Kotaro Tachikawa
2	DF	JPN	Rei Umeki
3	DF	KOR	Taiga Son
4	DF	JPN	Ryota Ichihara
5	MF	JPN	Hikaru Arai
6	MF	JPN	Yuki Kajiura (on loan from FC Tokyo)
7	MF	JPN	Takafumi Yamada
8	MF	JPN	Kota Mori
9	MF	JPN	Takatora Kondo
10	FW	BRA	Edigar Junio
11	FW	BRA	Wesley Tanque
14	MF	JPN	Yoshiaki Komai (on loan from Yokohama FC)
15	DF	JPN	Kenta Kikuchi
16	GK	JPN	Toi Yamamoto
17	MF	JPN	Kyota Mochii
18	GK	JPN	Genta Ito
19	FW	JPN	Kengo Furuyama (on loan from Cerezo Osaka)
21	GK	JPN	Yosuke Yamada

No.	Pos.	Nation	Player
22	FW	JPN	Hiroki Abe
23	DF	KOR	Lee Young-jun
24	DF	JPN	Yuri Takeuchi
25	MF	JPN	Riki Sato
26	MF	SRB	Aleksandar Paločević
29	DF	JPN	Yamato Maruyama
30	MF	JPN	Hayato Shibano
34	FW	JPN	Kiseki Kikuchi
35	DF	JPN	Kazuki Kushibiki
36	MF	JPN	Keito Kubo
38	MF	JPN	Hikaru Umakoshi
39	MF	JPN	Takumi Tsuchiya
44	FW	JPN	Masamichi Hayashi (on loan from JEF United Chiba)
71	GK	JPN	Toru Takagiwa
77	MF	JPN	Junya Kato
80	MF	JPN	Takuhiro Nakai
99	DF	BRA	Gabriel Gomes

== Coaching staff ==
As of 21 September 2026.

Position	Name
Manager	(Japan) Yoshikiyo Kuboyama
Coach	(Japan) Takamasa Watanabe
Coach	(Japan) Kota Okamaoto
Coach	(Japan) Ryosuke Ochi
Goalkeeping Coach	(Japan) Tomohito Shugyo
Physical Coach	(Japan) Mario Komiya
Technical Staff	(Japan) Seigo Fujita
Executive Officer	(Japan) Masafumi Yano
Operations Officer	(Japan) Ryoichi Kanai
Press Officer	(Japan) Kanako Muroyama

== Managerial history ==
Manager	Nationality	Tenure	
Manager	Nationality	Start	Finish
Takahiro Kimura	Japan	February 1, 2012	January 31, 2016
Hirofumi Yoshitake	Japan	February 1, 2016	June 27, 2018
Naoto Kudo	Japan	June 27, 2018	January 31, 2019
Takeshi Ono	Japan	February 1, 2019	January 31, 2020
Lluís Planagumà	Spain	February 1, 2020	May 19, 2021
Kazuaki Hashikawa	Japan	May 19, 2021	May 23, 2021
Keiichiro Nuno	Japan	May 24, 2021	29 September 2021
Kazuaki Hashikawa	Japan	September 29, 2021	January 31, 2023
Riki Takagi	Japan	February 1, 2023	August 16, 2023
Naoto Kudo	Japan	August 16, 2023	January 31, 2024
Toshihiro Hattori	Japan	February 1, 2024	January 31, 2025
Keiji Kuraishi	Japan	February 1, 2025	April 8, 2026
Yuji Tsukada	Japan	April 8, 2026	June 10, 2026
Abel Mourelo López	Spain	June 11, 2026	September 21, 2026
Yoshikiyo Kuboyama	Japan	September 21, 2026	present

== Kit evolution ==
Home kit - 1st
2015	2016 - 2018	2019 - 2020	2021	2022 - 2023
2024 -				

Away kit - 2nd
2015	2016 - 2018	2019 - 2020	2021	2022 - 2023
2024 -				
