= EDION Corporation =

Japanese electronics retailer

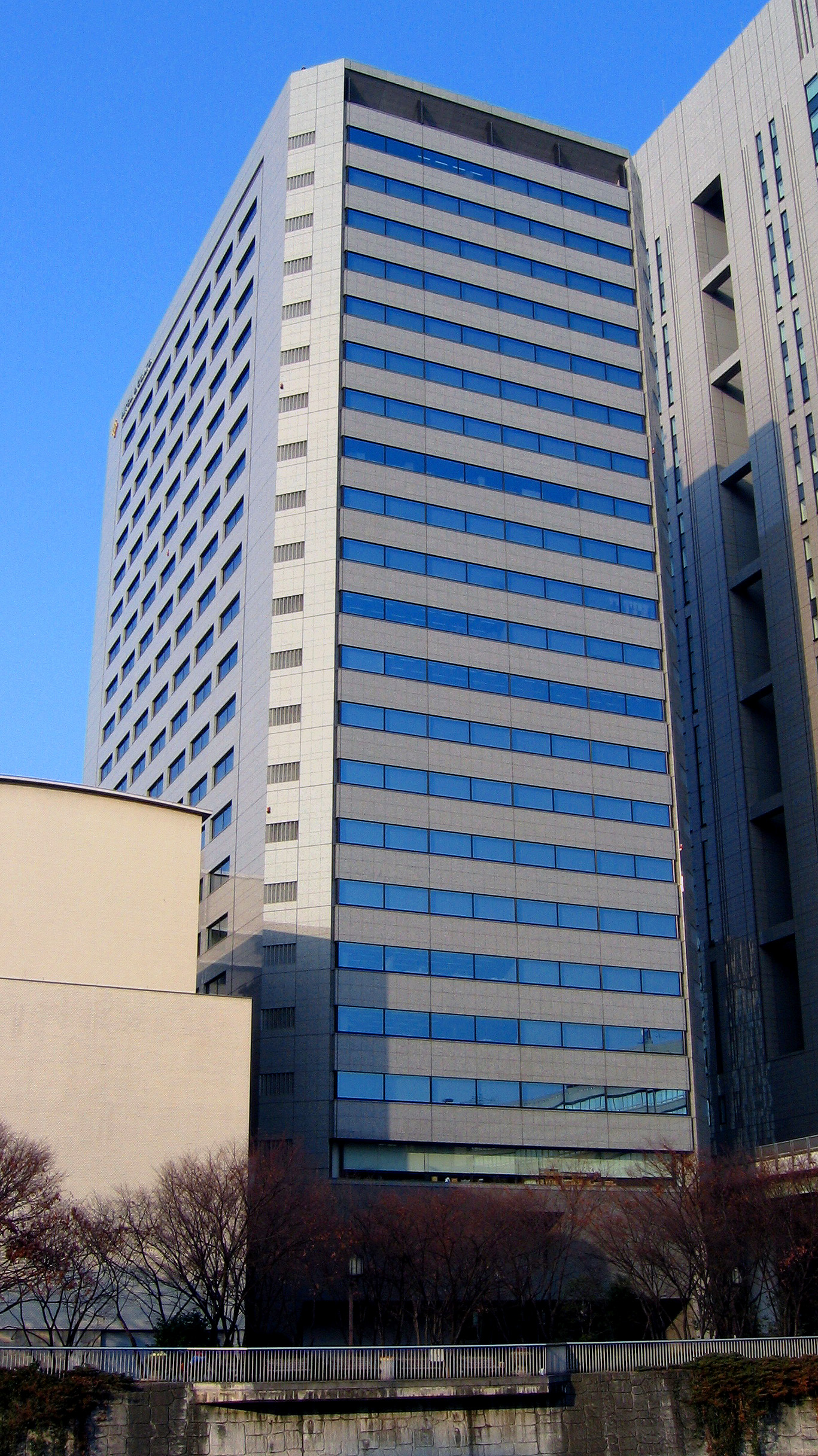
- EDION headquarters at the Mitsui & Co. Building in Osaka
- Native name: 株式会社エディオン
- Romanized name: Kabushiki gaisha Edion
- Type: Public (K.K.)
- Traded as: TYO: 2730
- Industry: Retail
- Predecessor: Eiden; Deodeo; Midori Denka; Ishimaru Denki
- Founded: March 29, 2002; 24 years ago
- Headquarters: Osaka, Japan
- Number of locations: 1,212
- Area served: Japan
- Key people: Masataka Kubo (Chairman & CEO); Norio Yamasaki (EVP & Chief Corporate Planning Officer)
- Products: Consumer electronics; Home appliances; Video games and consoles; Toys
- Revenue: ¥11.94 billion (March 21, 2021)
- Operating income: ¥26,785,000 (Consolidated); ¥25,032,000 (Non-consolidated)
- Net income: ¥16,633,000 (Consolidated); ¥16,033,000 (Non-consolidated); (March 21, 2021)
- Owner: Lixil Group (10.00%); Nitori Holdings (8.37%); EDION Group Employee Stock Ownership Association (7.49%); The Master Trust Bank of Japan (3.93%); Deodeo (3.22%); Custody Bank of Japan (2.89%)
- Number of employees: 9,007 (Consolidated); 7,918 (Non-consolidated)
- Website: www.edion.co.jp

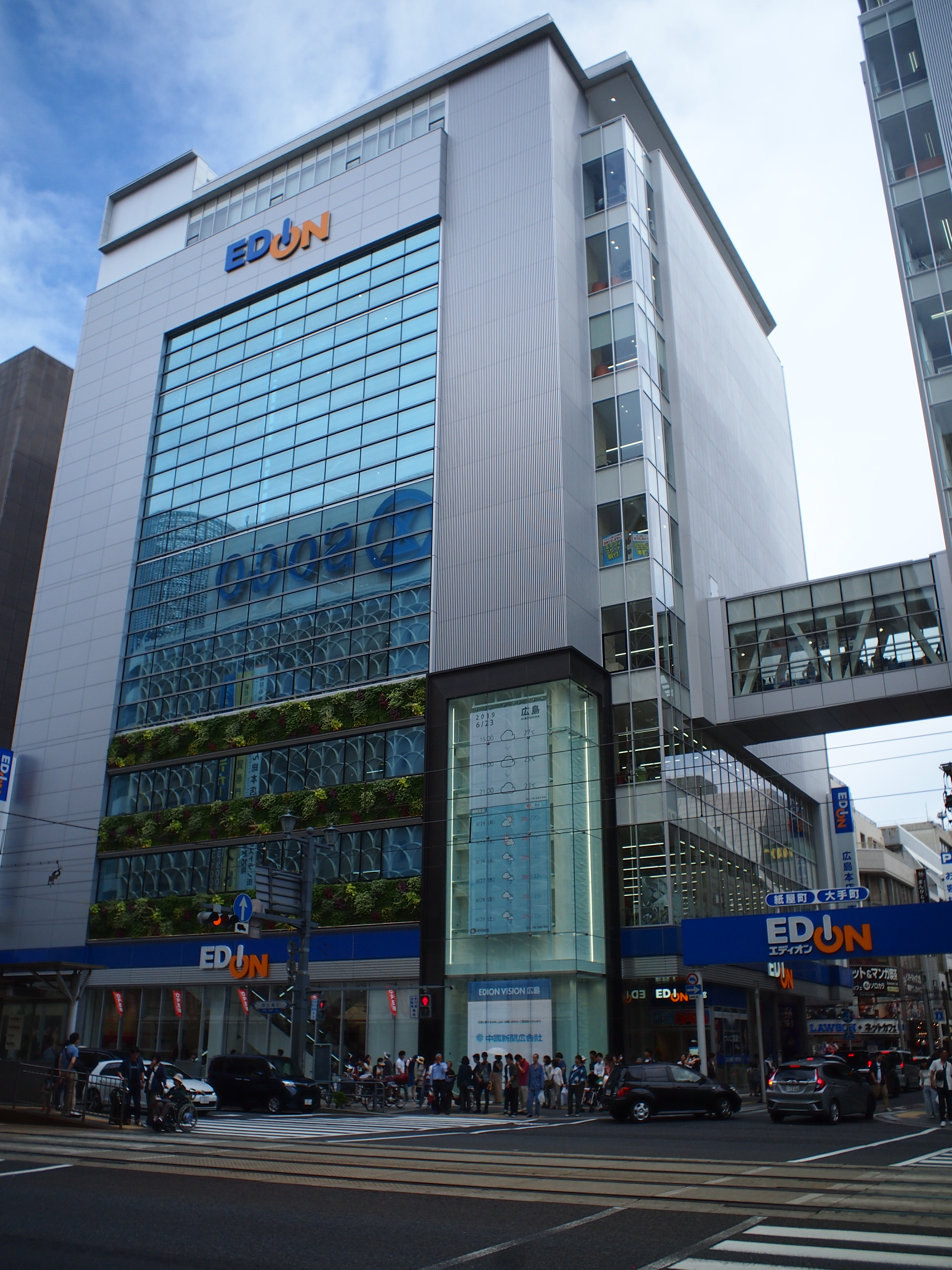
EDION main store, in Hiroshimna

EDION Corporation (株式会社エディオン, Kabushiki gaisha Edion) (short for "Exciting Discovery In One Network") is a consumer electronics retailer chain in Japan. It was formerly a holding company that operated multiple chain brands. As of 2023, EDION is the fifth largest electronics and home appliance retailer, behind Yamada Denki, Bic Camera, K's Holdings, and Yodobashi Camera.

== History ==
EDION was founded on March 29, 2002 as a joint holding company of Chūbu region chain Eiden (エイデン) and Chūgoku region chain Deodeo. In order to compete with northern Kantō region electronics retailers such as Yamada Denki, which were expanding nationwide, EDION entered into business alliances with Osaka chain Joshin Denki (上新電機株式会社, Kabushiki gaisha Jōshin Denki), Kansai region chain Midori Denka (株式会社ミドリ電化, Kabushiki gaisha Midori Denka), Hokuriku region and Hokkaido chain 3Q (株式会社サンキュー, Kabushiki gaisha Sankyū), and Tōhoku region and Hokkaido chain Denkodo (株式会社 デンコードー, Kabushiki gaisha Denkōdō). The "Voice Network" (ボイスネットワーク, Boisu Nettowāku) was formed by the five companies to plan and develop original products. However, in 2004, Midori Denka merged with EDION, and the alliance with the remaining three companies was temporarily dissolved. In July 2006, EDION absorbed Kantō region chain Ishimaru Denki (石丸電気株式会社, Ishimaru Denki Kabushiki gaisha). The company also invested in Maruni Wood Industry Inc. (株式会社マルニ木工, Kabushiki gaisha Maruni Mokkō), a core company of the Maruni Group that manufactures furniture, showing its desire to become an fast fashion specialist.

In February 2007, EDION acquired 40% of the shares in 3Q and made it a consolidated subsidiary. Listed on the Tokyo Stock Exchange and Nagoya Stock Exchange (TYO: 2730), the head office moved from Nagoya to Osaka from January to July 2007 with the aim of strengthening the foundations of the Kansai region. In total, the company operates 1,212 stores under its umbrella (as of March 2014). On February 8, EDION entered into a business and capital alliance with Bic Camera to develop an urban station-type business. Ultimately, the aim was to integrate the businesses, but as it became clear that there were differences in direction, the two companies decided to only form a business partnership and the integration was scrapped. After that, the business partnership with Bic Camera was terminated at the expiration of the two-year contract.

In October 2009, the operating subsidiaries were reorganized into two divisions: EDION East and EDION west. A year later, both divisions were merged and transferred from a holding company to an operating company, completing a series of integrations. In conjunction with the series of reorganizations, the company established a "regional brand" strategy and transferred stores outside its territory to its original regional management company.

In 2012, Best Denki entered into a capital and business alliance with Yamada Denki. On December 10, the Fair Trade Commission approved the merger on the condition that eight of the 10 areas where there are no stores other than those of the two companies would be transferred to other businesses. From September to November, EDION acquired six stores located in Chichibu, Asakura, Karatsu, Shimabara, Isahaya, and Hitoyoshi from Yamada Denki and Best Denki. At the same time, on October 16, 2013, EDION acquired Kakoi Electro (カコイエレクトロ, Kakoi Erekutoro), which was a Best Denki franchisee in Kagoshima Prefecture. On October 25, 17 Best Denki stores opened as "EDION Kagoshima".

On August 26, 2013, EDION announced a capital and business alliance with Lixil Group. At the same time, a third-party allotment of capital was carried out, and on September 11, Lixil Group became the largest shareholder with an 8.00% stake (currently the second largest shareholder), and EDION became engaged in the housing remodeling business.

On April 27, 2022, EDION formed a capital and business alliance with Nitori Holdings. On May 13, Lixil planned to acquire all of the EDION shares held by Lixil, and held a total of 10%, including the portion acquired on the market. Later, in October of the same year, it was announced that Nitori products would be sold at some stores.

On March 27, 2024, EDION announced it will absorb 3Q in April 2025.

== Marketing ==
To celebrate its 10th anniversary in 2012, EDION partnered with Celine Dion to promote the rebranding of Ishimaru, Midori, Eiden, and Deodeo stores nationwide, using the catchphrase: "Watashi, Celine EDION" (私、セリーヌ・エディオン; lit. "I, Celine EDION").

== Naming rights ==
From 2013 to 2024, EDION owned the naming rights to the Hiroshima Big Arch, which was known as the EDION Stadium Hiroshima. In June 2015, the company purchased the naming rights to the Osaka Prefectural Gymnasium, which is currently known we the EDION Arena Osaka. EDION owns the naming rights to the Edion Peace Wing Hiroshima, a soccer stadium that opened in 2024 as the current home of the J.League team Sanfrecce Hiroshima. The naming rights costs the corporation ¥100 million a year and runs until January 31, 2034.

== Stores ==
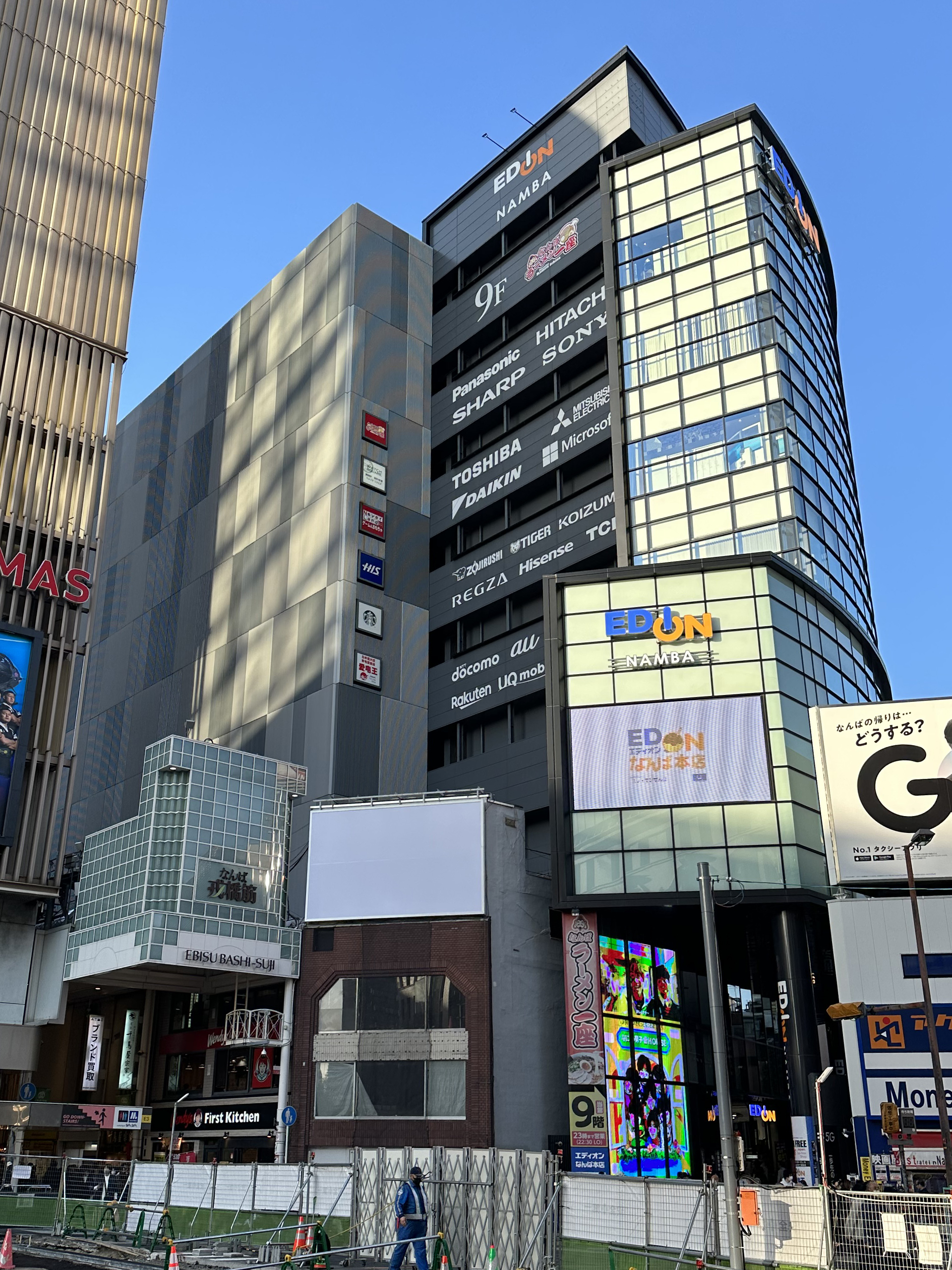
EDION Namba main store, Osaka

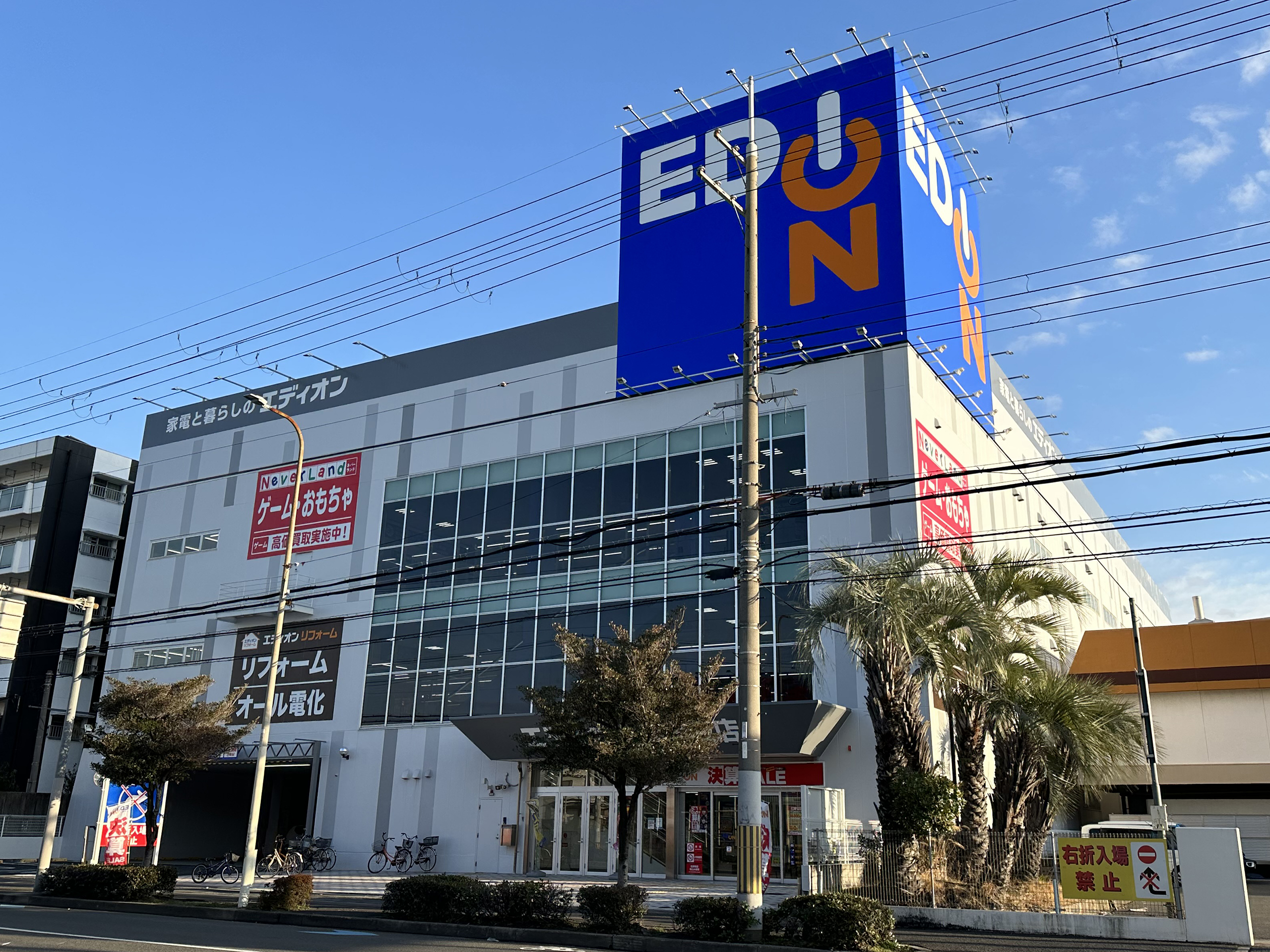
EDION Higashiōsaka (former Midori Denka), Osaka

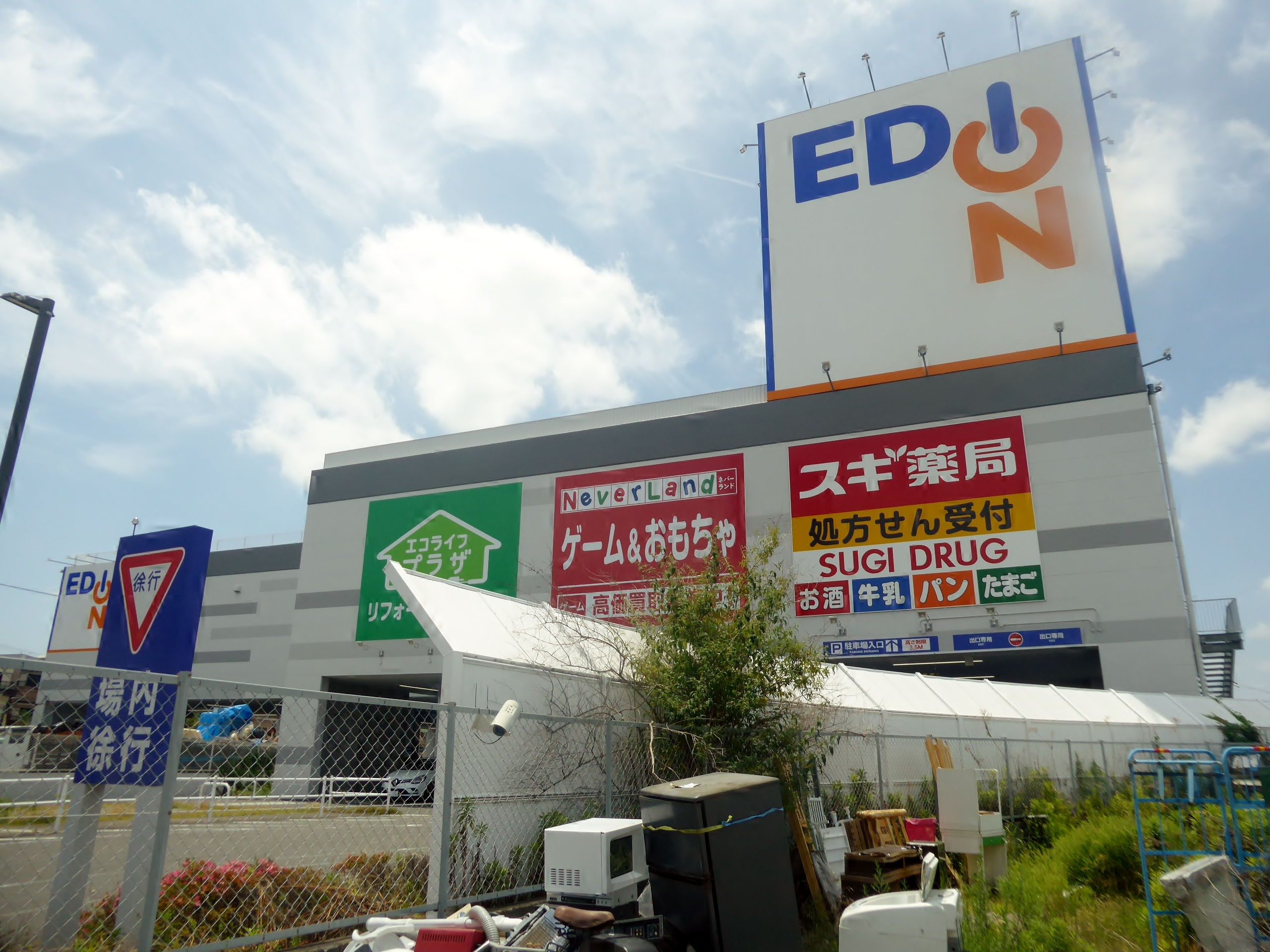
EDION Kadoma (former Midori Denka), Osaka

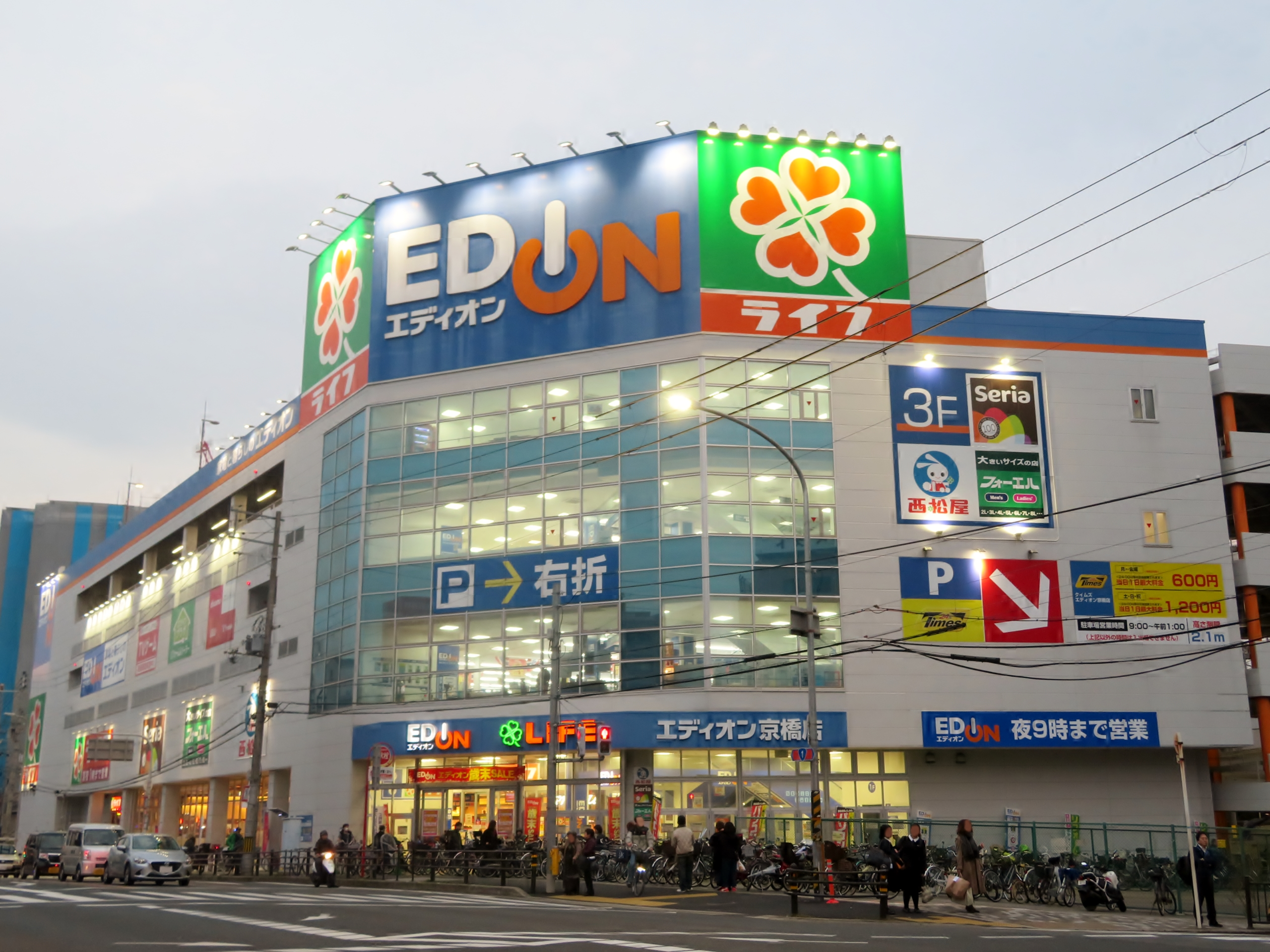
EDION Kyōbashi, Osaka

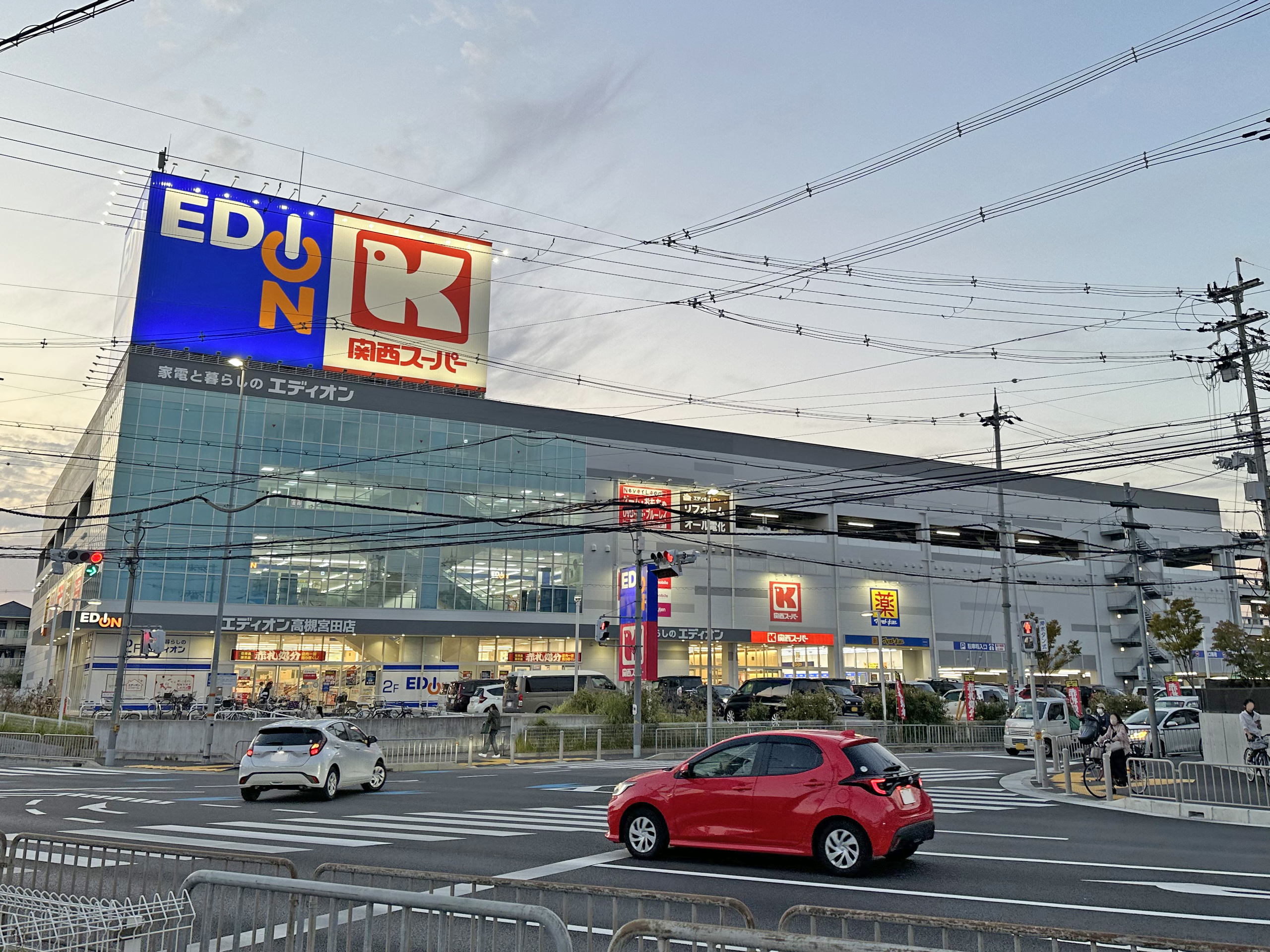
EDION Takatsuki, Osaka

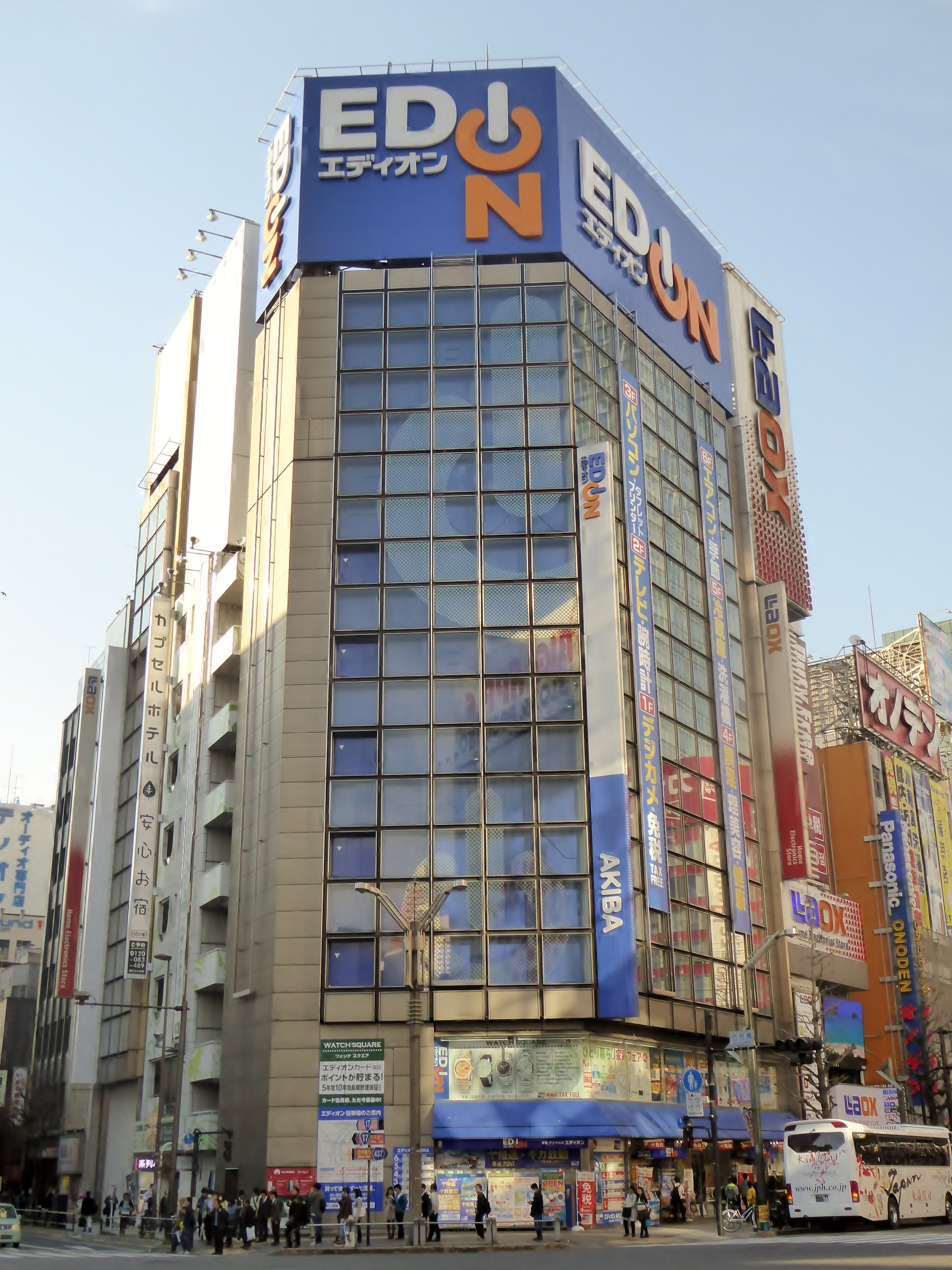
EDION Akiba (former Ishimaru Denki), Tokyo

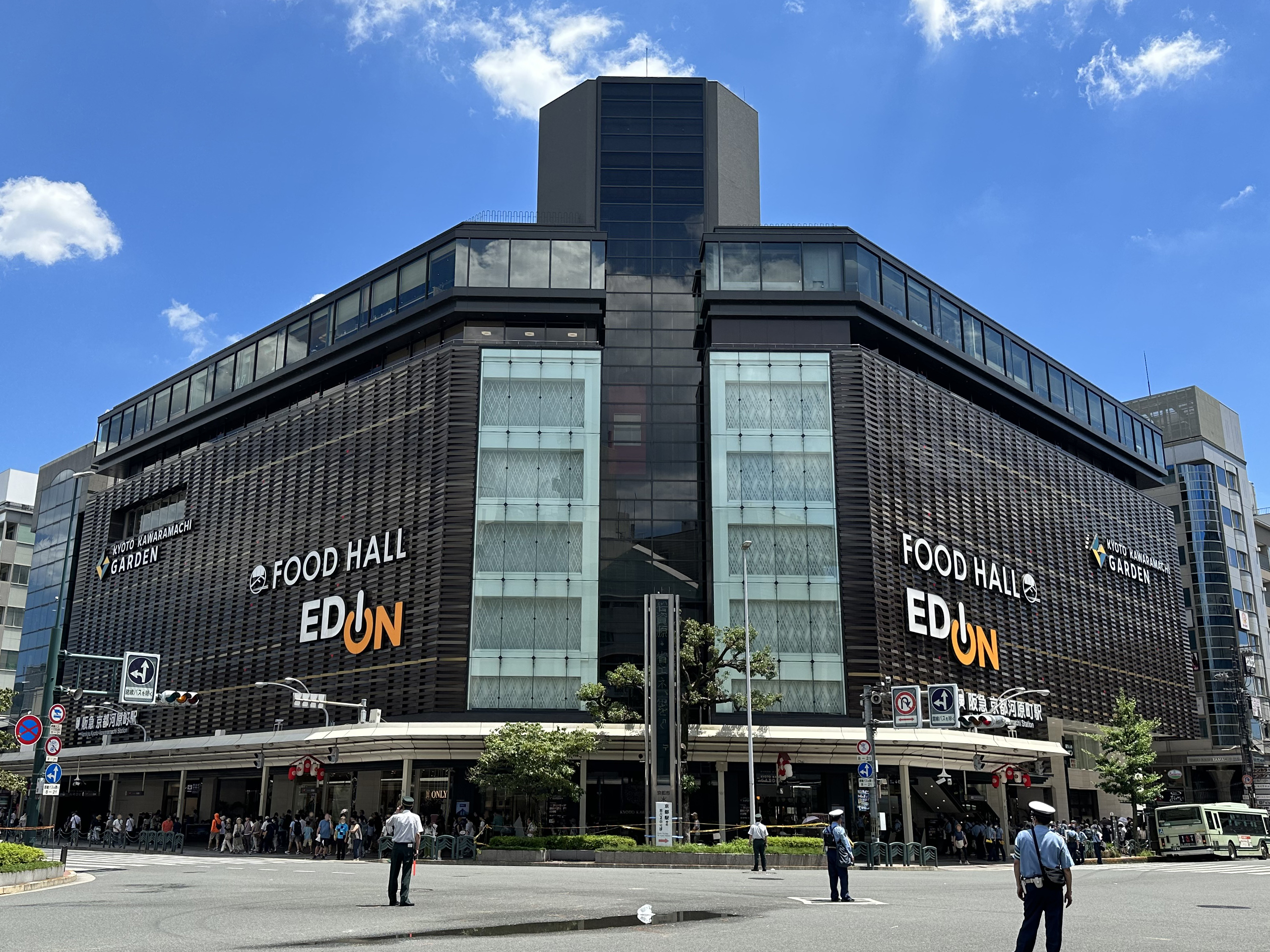
EDION Kyoto Kawaramachi Garden, Kyoto

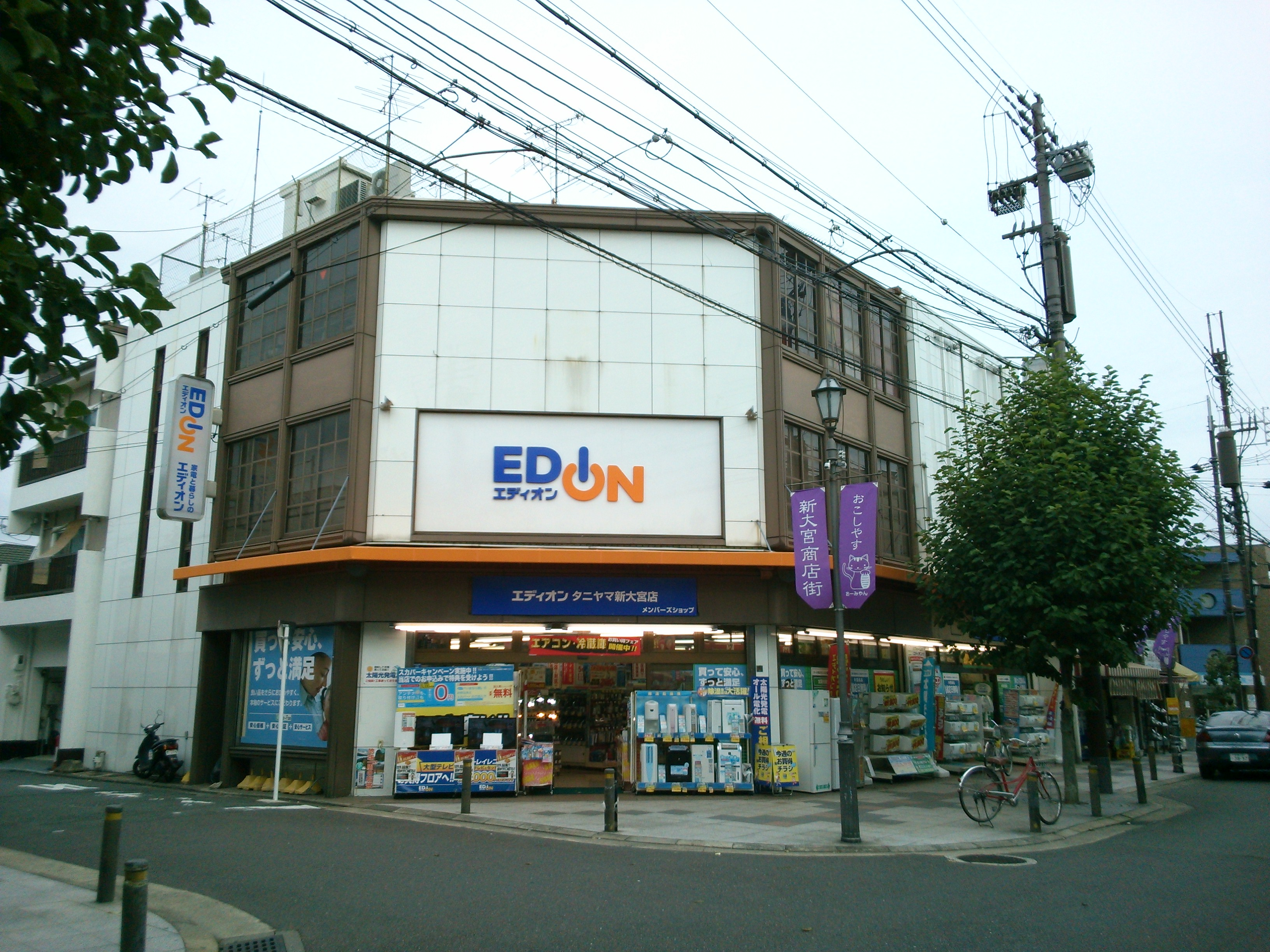
EDION Shin-Ōmiya, Kyoto

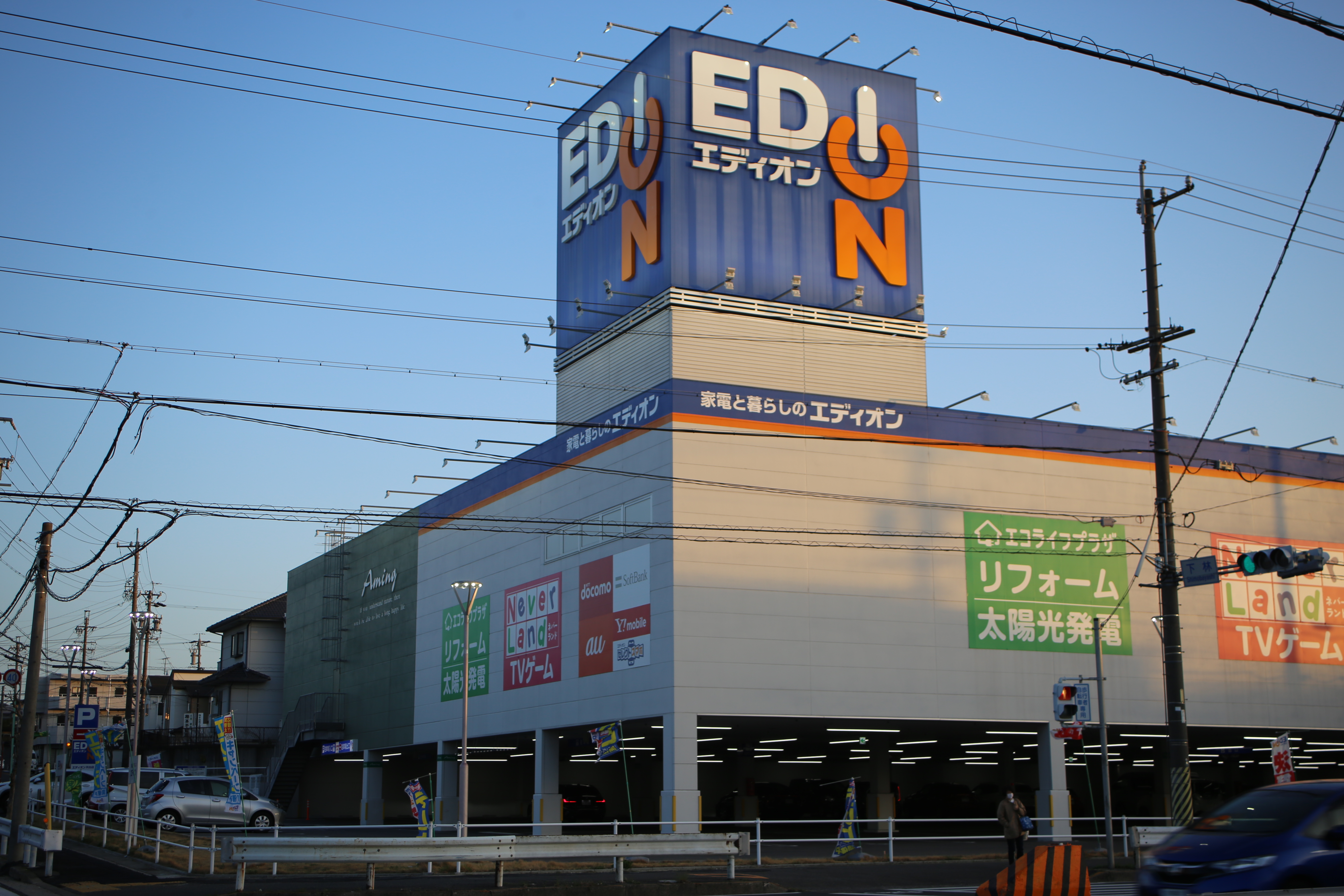
EDION Nagoya (former Eiden), Nagoya

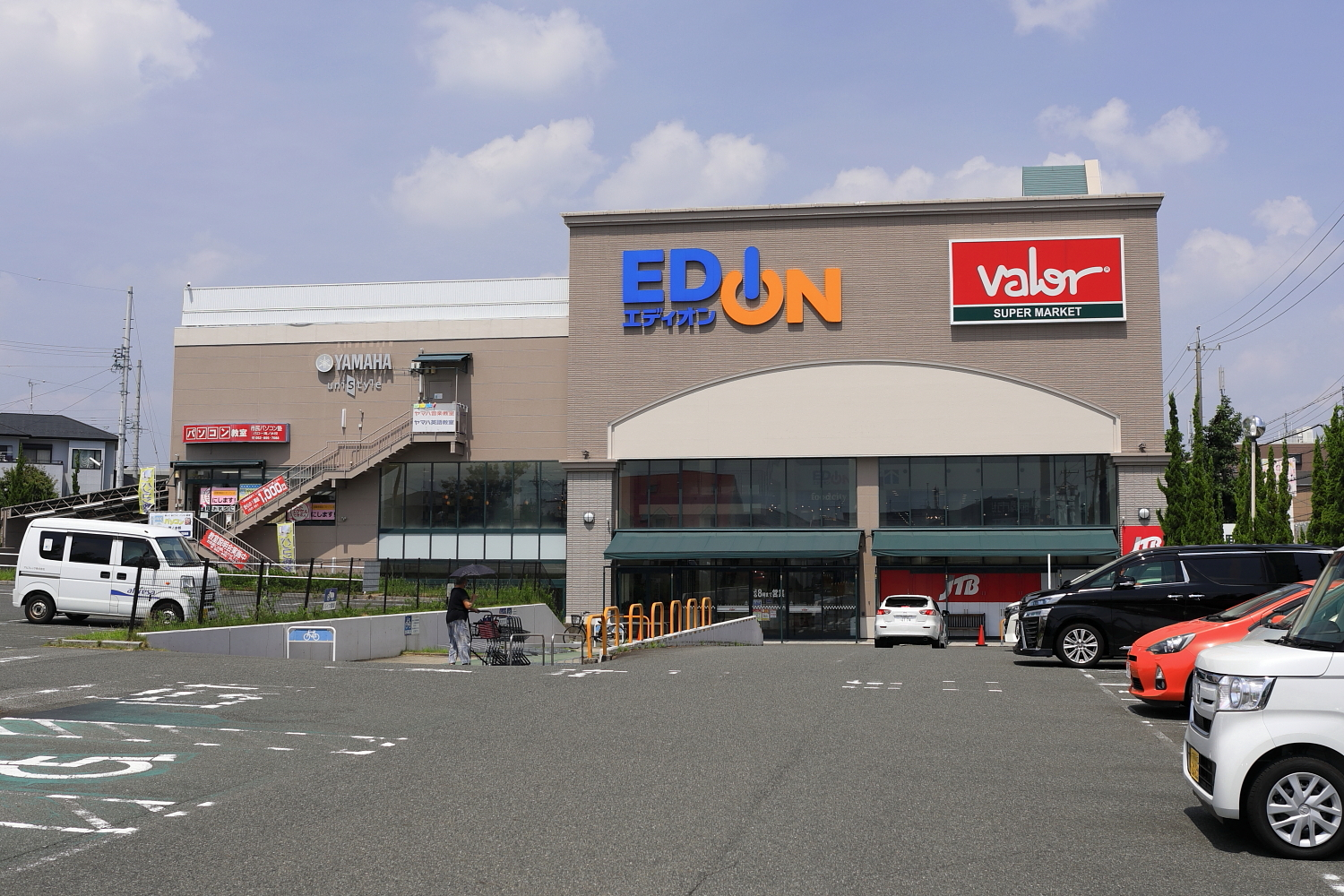
EDION Takinomizu, Nagoya

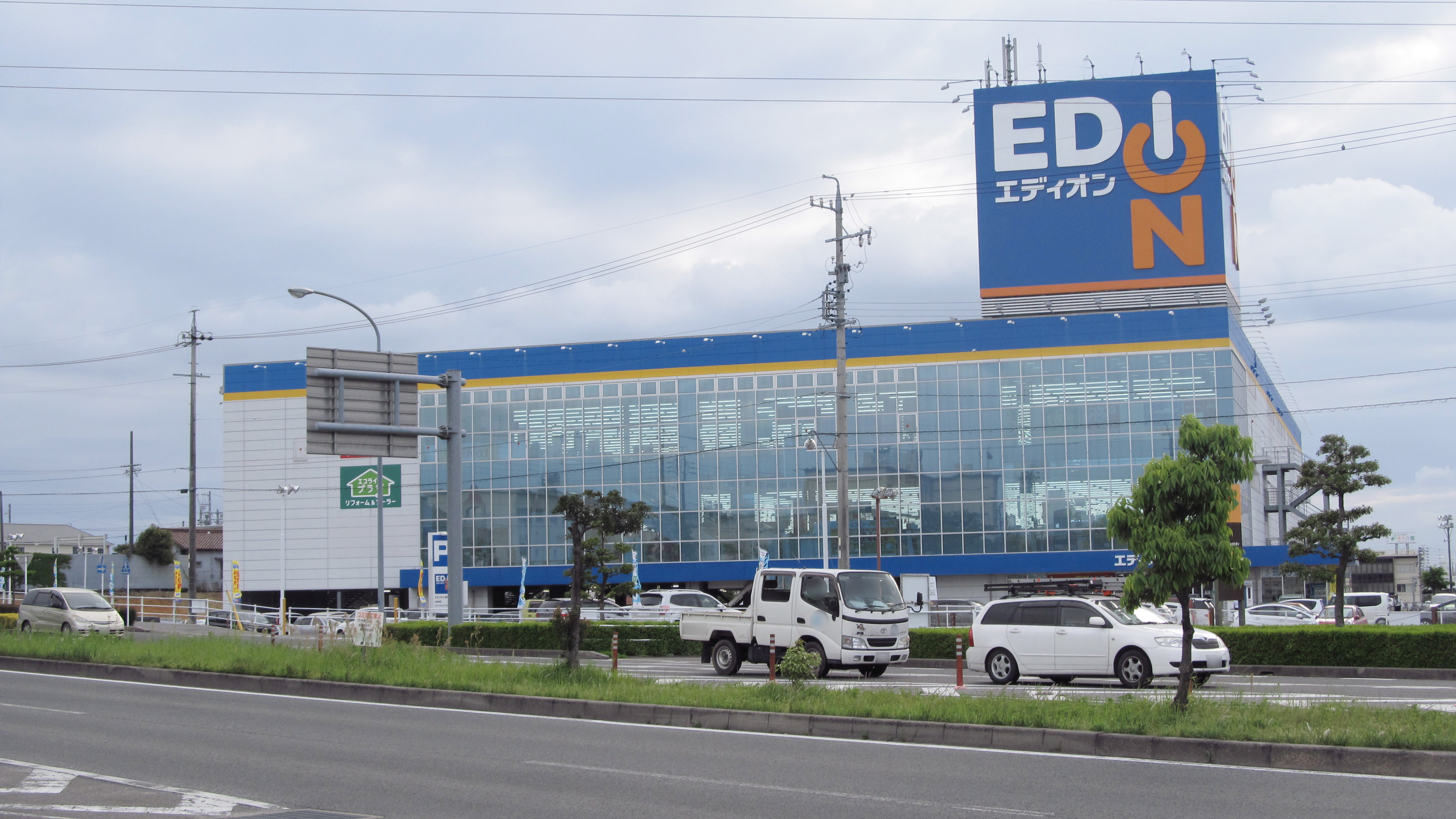
EDION Toyota (former Eiden), Toyota

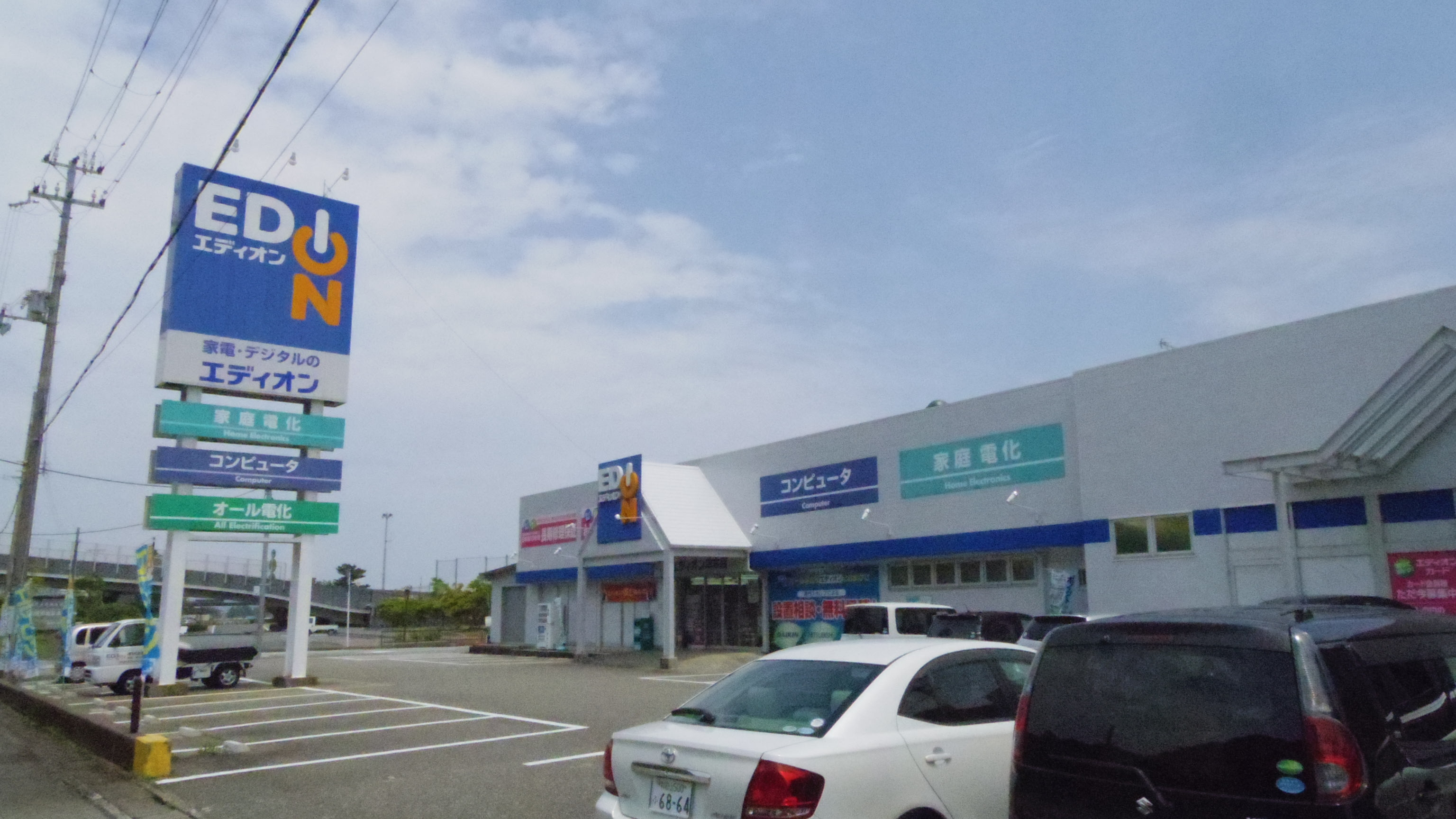
EDION Kushimoto, Wakayama

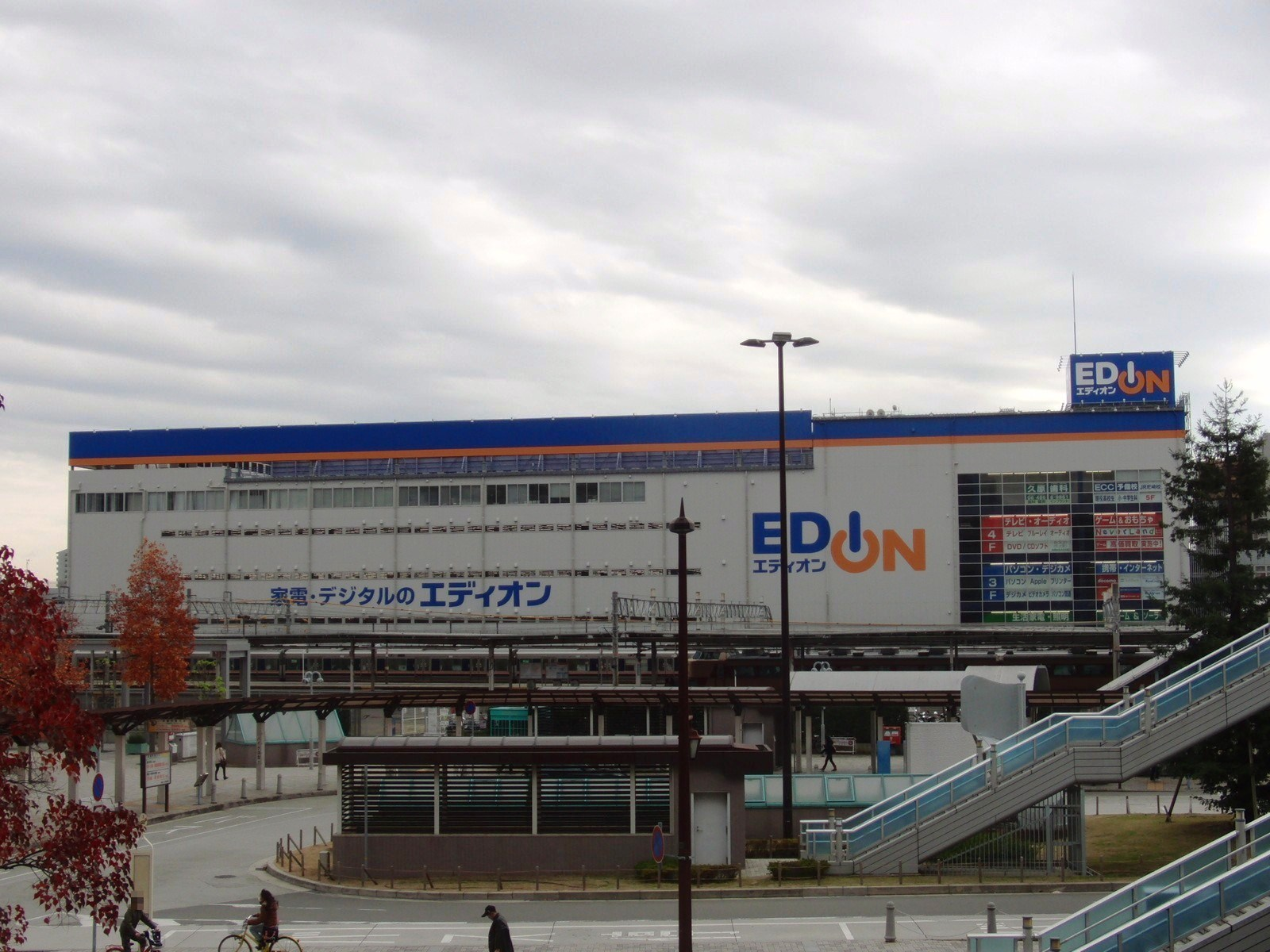
EDION JR Amagasaki Station (former Midori Denka), Amagasaki

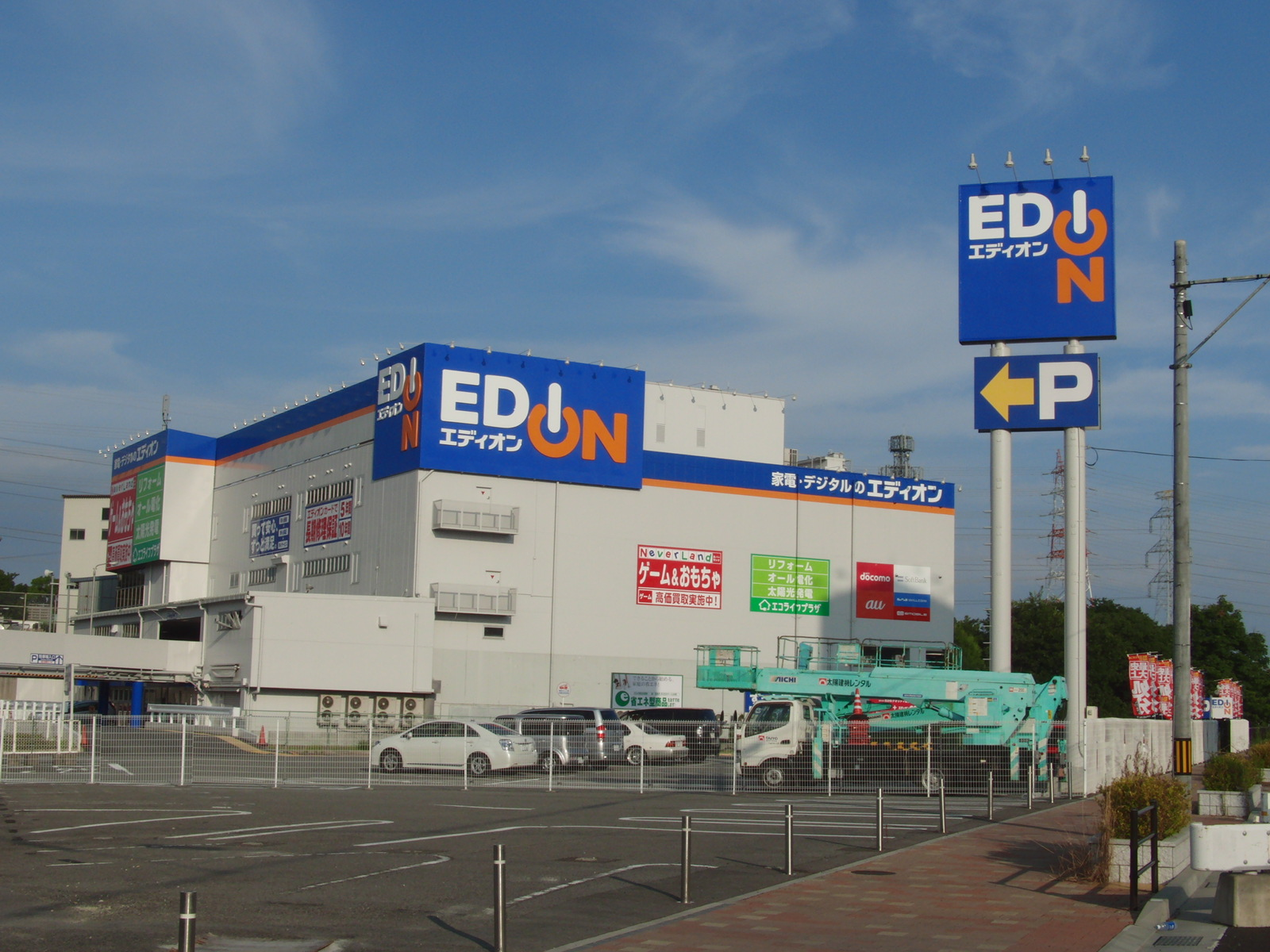
EDION Takarazuka, Hyōgo

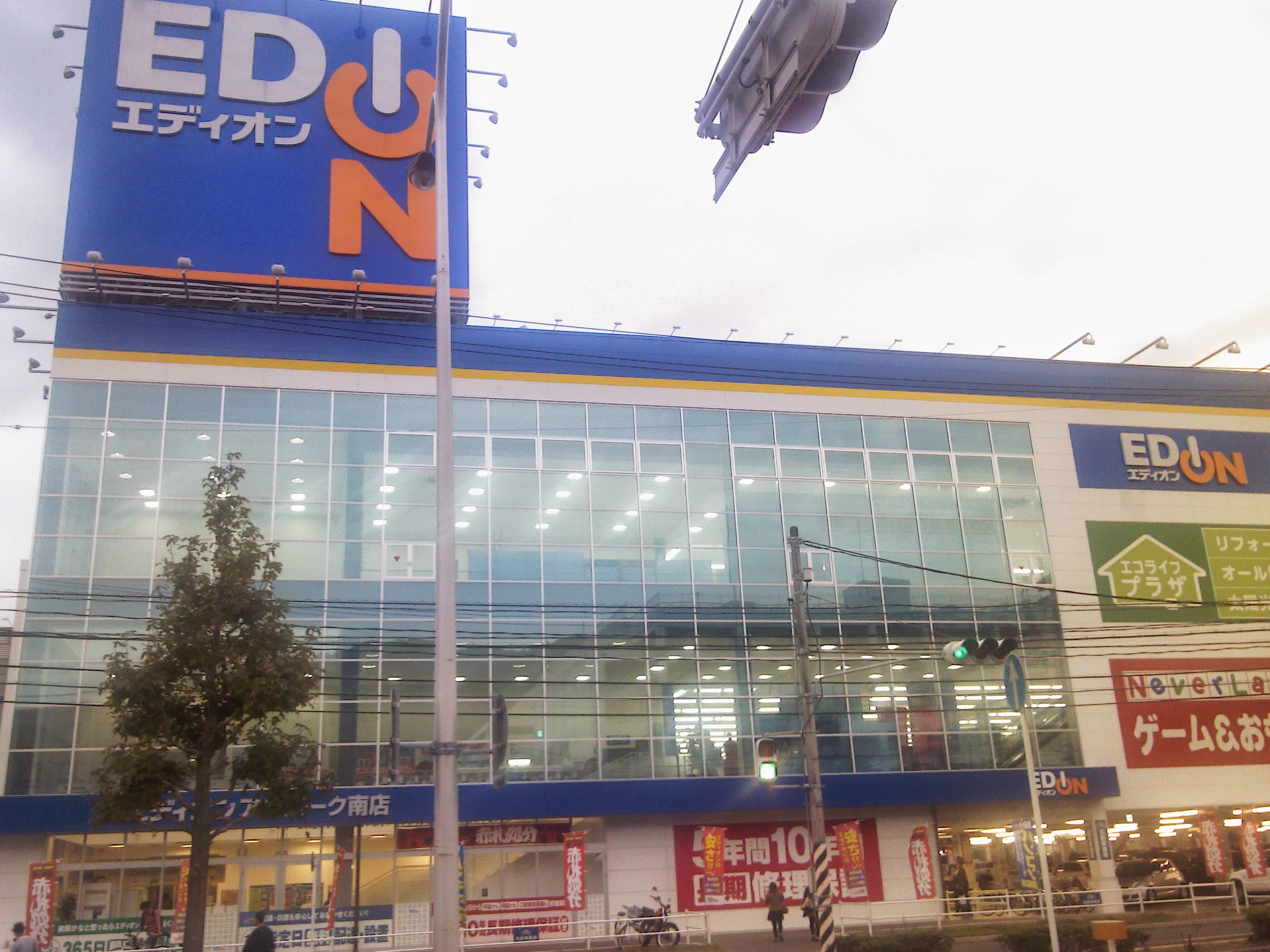
EDION Alpark Minami (former Deodeo), Hiroshima

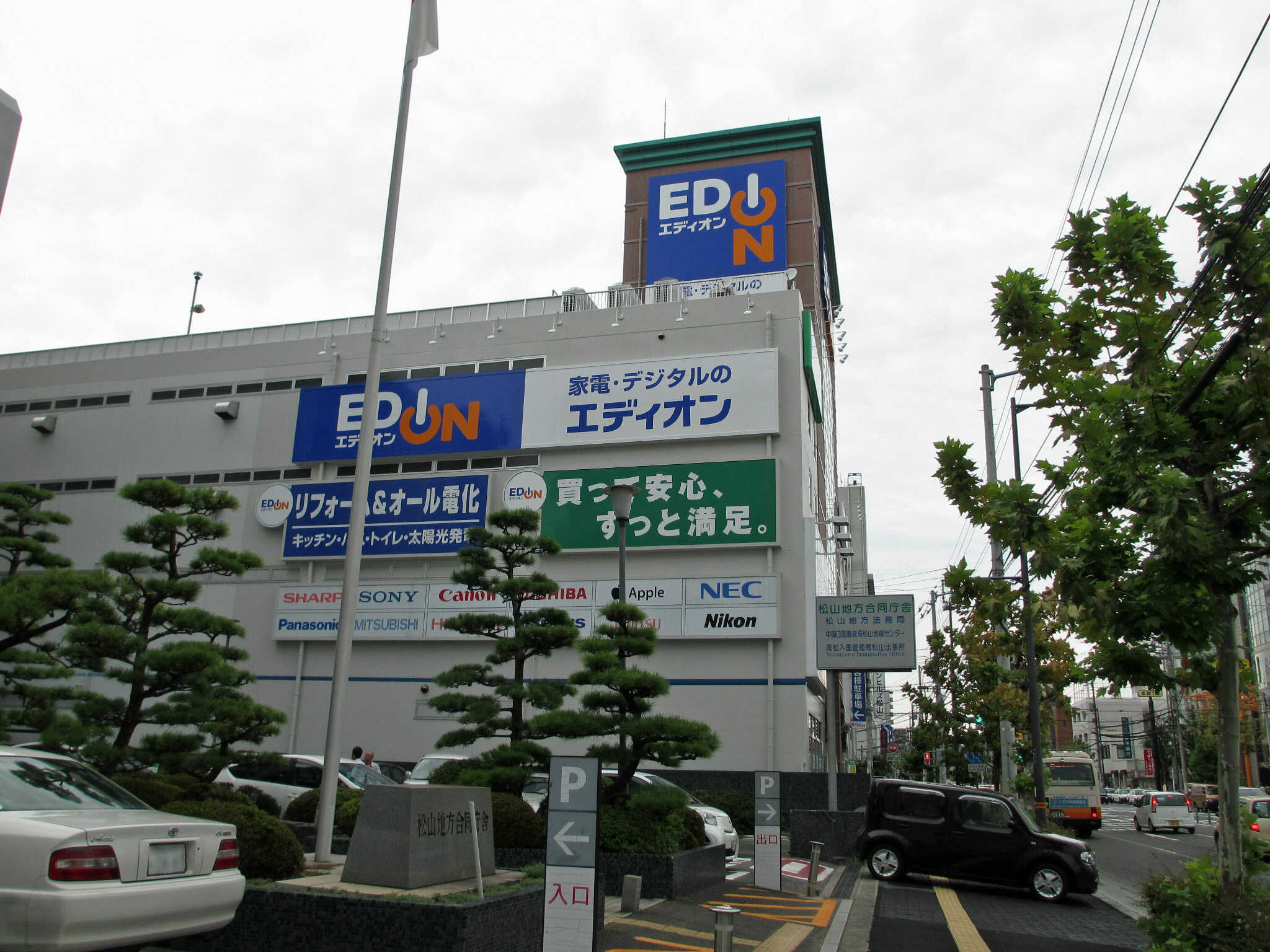
EDION Miyatamachi, Matsuyama

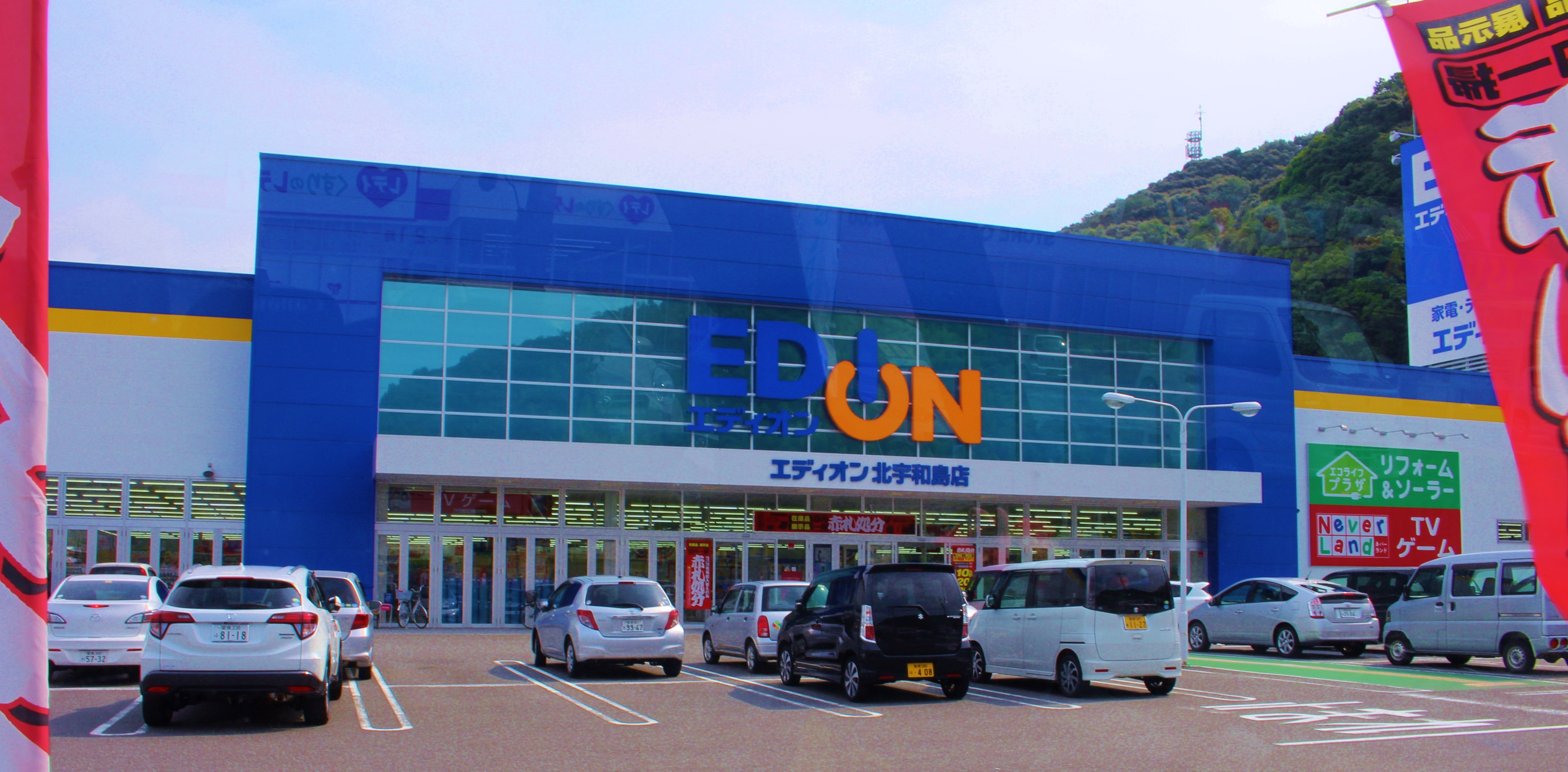
EDION Kita-Uwajima, Uwajima

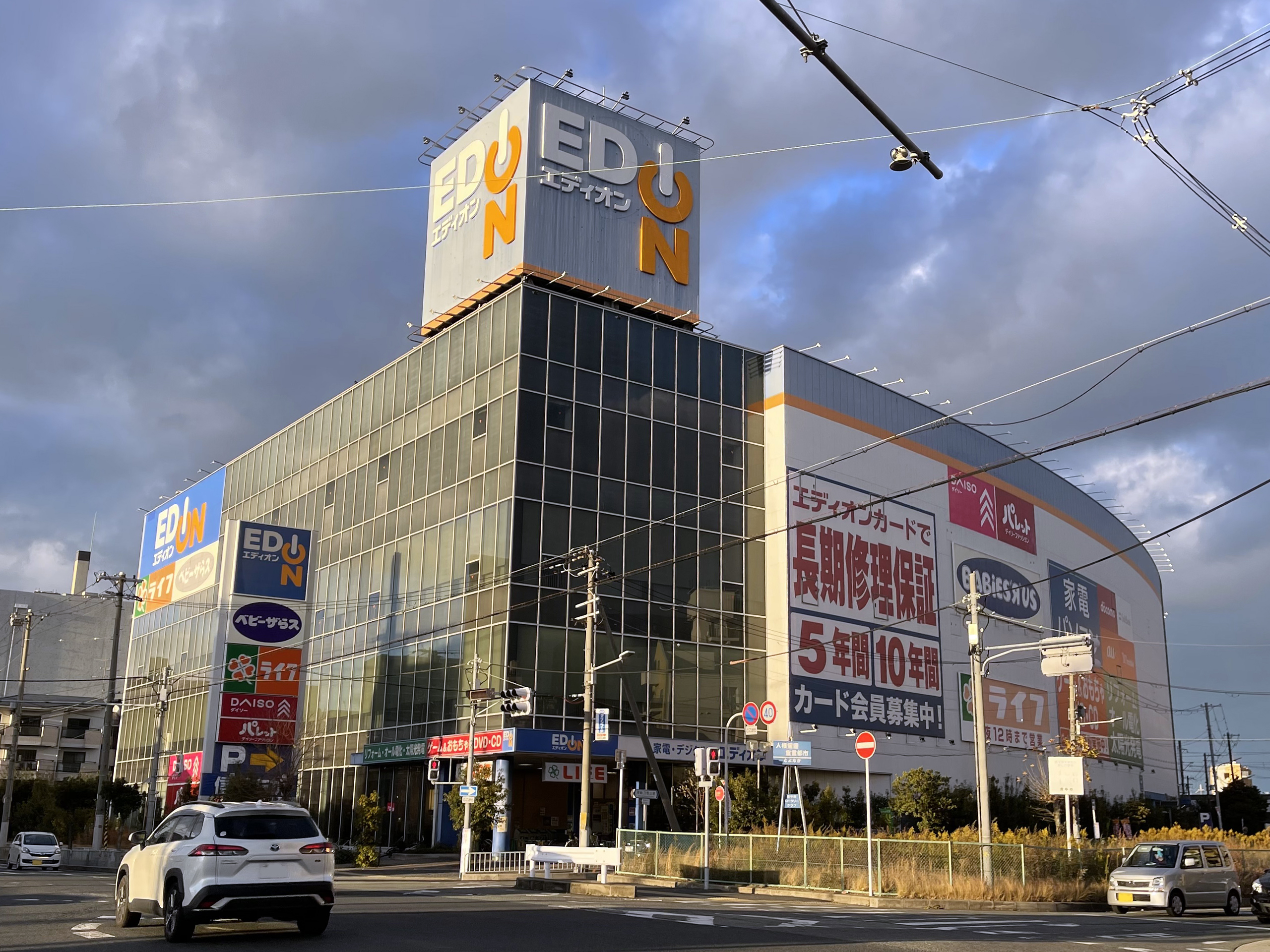
EDION Toyonaka, Mitoyo
