= Fumoto =

Fumoto (麓, Fumoto, lit. 'foot of the mountain') is a Japanese surname. Notable people with this surname include:

- Midori Fumoto (born 1971), Japanese long-distance runner
- Ojiro Fumoto (born 1990), Japanese video game designer
