= Midori Fumoto =

Japanese long-distance runner (born 1971)

Midori Fumoto (麓みどり, Fumoto Midori; born 1971) is a Japanese former long-distance runner. She has belonged DEODEO Athletic Club for Women. In 1992 she set a record for best time in a half marathon in Gold Coast, one hour 9 minutes 38 seconds, the record stood for 18 years before being broken by Lisa Jane Weightman.

She was the 1993 winner of the 10,000 metres at the Japan Championships in Athletics.

== Competition record ==
Year	Competition	Venue	Position	Event	Notes
1992	International Chiba Ekiden	Chiba, Japan	1st	Ekiden - as the 1st runner of Japan national team	
1993	Beijing International Ekiden	Beijing	4th	Ekiden - as the 3rd runner of Japan national team	
1995	International Chiba Ekiden	Chiba, Japan	1st	Ekiden - as the 6th runner of Japan national team	
1998	Chugoku Women's Ekiden	Hiroshima, Japan	1st	Ekiden - as the 5th runner of DEODEO	
1999	Chugoku Women's Ekiden	Hiroshima, Japan	2nd	Ekiden - as the 5th runner of DEODEO	
2000	Nagoya International Women's Marathon	Nagoya, Japan	4th	Marathon	
	Chugoku Women's Ekiden	Hiroshima, Japan	1st	Ekiden - as the 1st runner of DEODEO	
	All Japan Women's Ekiden	Gifu, Japan	6th	Ekiden - as the 6th runner of DEODEO	
2001	All Japan Women's Ekiden	Gifu, Japan	5th	Ekiden - as the 4th runner of DEODEO	
2002	Chugoku Women's Ekiden	Hiroshima, Japan	5th	Ekiden - as the 4th runner of DEODEO	
