= Deodeo =

Former Japanese consumer electronics retailer

Deodeo Corporation
- Native name: 株式会社デオデオ
- Romanized name: Kabushiki gaisha Deodeo
- Company type: Public (KK)
- Traded as: TYO: 8199; JASDAQ: 8199
- Industry: Retail
- Founded: May 7, 1947
- Defunct: September 30, 2009
- Fate: Rebranded into EDION
- Successor: EDION Corporation
- Headquarters: Hatsukaichi, Hiroshima Prefecture, Japan
- Area served: Japan
- Number of employees: 3,234 (as of March 31, 2006)

Deodeo Corporation (株式会社デオデオ, Kabushiki gaisha Deodeo) was a consumer electronics retailer chain based in Hatsukaichi, Hiroshima, Japan, having served the Chūgoku region. The company operated until September 30, 2009, when it changed its name to EDION West Corporation a day later.

== History ==
In 1946, Kubo Kyōdai Denki Shōkai (久保兄弟電機商会; lit. Kubo Brothers Electric Company) was founded in Hiroshima. The company was renamed Daiichi Sangyo Co., Ltd. (第一産業株式会社, Daiichi Sangyō Kabushiki gaisha). From 1977 to 1979, Daiichi was ranked number one in the home appliance industry in a Nikkei Ryutsu Shimbun specialty store survey.

On October 1, 1986, the company changed its name to Daiichi Co. Ltd. (株式会社ダイイチ, Kabushiki gaisha Daiichi). On April 1, 1997, it was renamed Deodeo and moved its headquarters to Hatsukaichi.

On March 29, 2002, DEODEO and Chūbu region chain Eiden (エイデン) founded EDION Corporation. On October 1, 2009, Deodeo merged with Kansai region chain Midori Denka (株式会社ミドリ電化, Kabushiki gaisha Midori Denka) and was rebranded EDION West; a year later, EDION West merged with EDION East (formerly Eiden). On October 1, 2012, all Deodeo, Midori, and Eiden stores, as well as Kantō region chain Ishimaru Denki (石丸電気株式会社, Kabushiki gaisha Ishimaru Denki), were completely rebranded into EDION; the Deodeo name continues to be used as a store brand.
