= Yamada Denki =

Japanese electronics retailer

Yamada-Denki Co., Ltd.

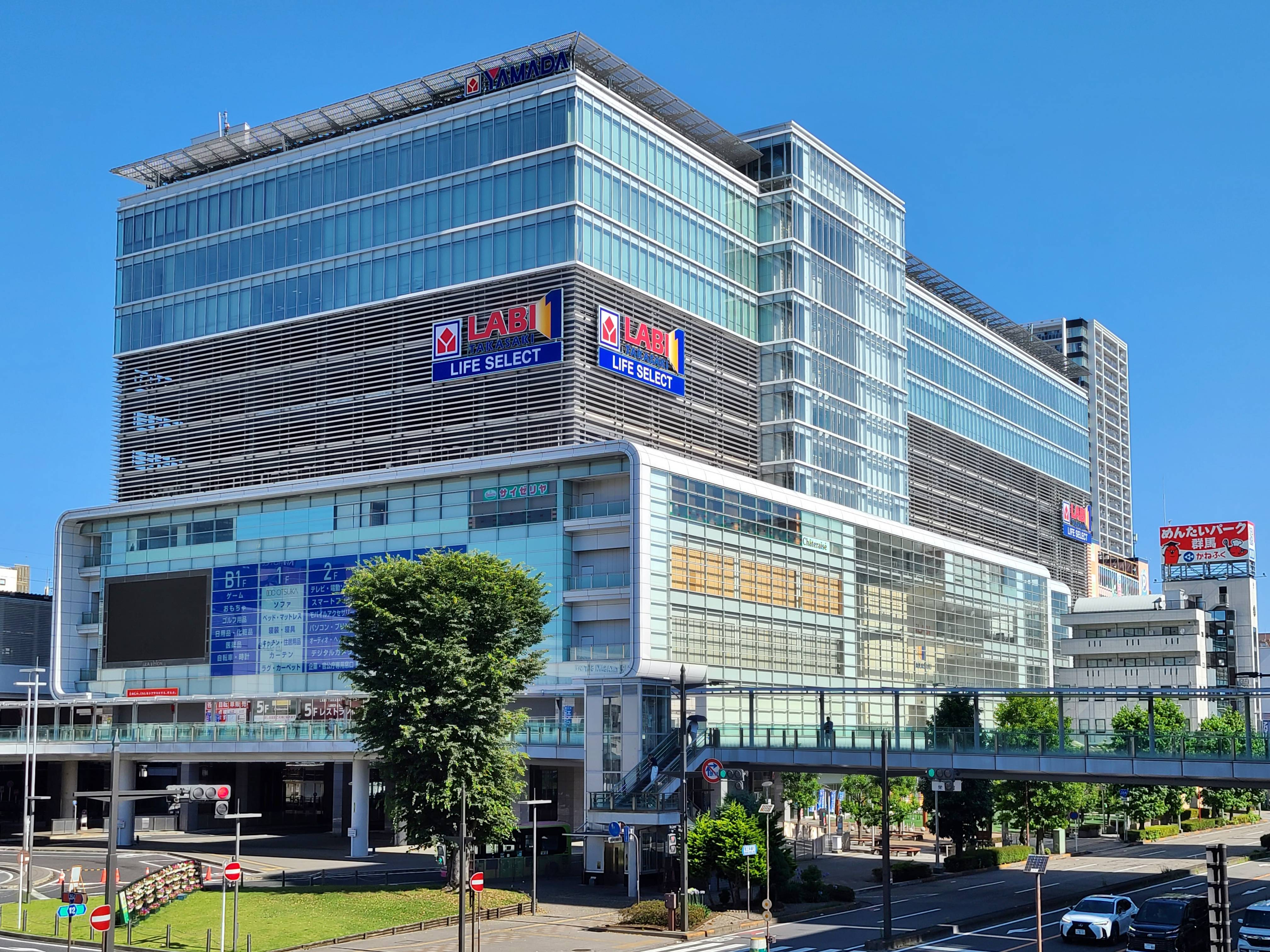
- Yamada Denki LAB1 Life Select in Takasaki
- Native name: 株式会社ヤマダデンキ
- Romanized name: Kabushiki gaisha Yamada Denki
- Company type: Public KK
- Traded as: TYO: 9831
- Industry: Retail
- Founded: June 1, 1978 (Nihon Densen Kōgyō); Former Yamada Denki founded on September 1, 1983 (established in April 1973)
- Headquarters: Takasaki, Gunma, Japan
- Key people: Noboru Yamada, Representative Director, Chairman, President and CEO Tsuneo Mishima, Representative Director and President - The Consumer Electronics Segment Koji Ono, Representative Director and President - The Subsidiary Consumer Electronics Segment (The Best Denki Co. Ltd)
- Products: Discount department store, electronics specialty
- Revenue: $15.1B (2022)
- Total assets: $11.6B (2022)
- Number of employees: 24,300 (2022)
- Subsidiaries: Daikuma; Kansai Yamada Denki; Best Denki
- Website: yamada-denki.jp

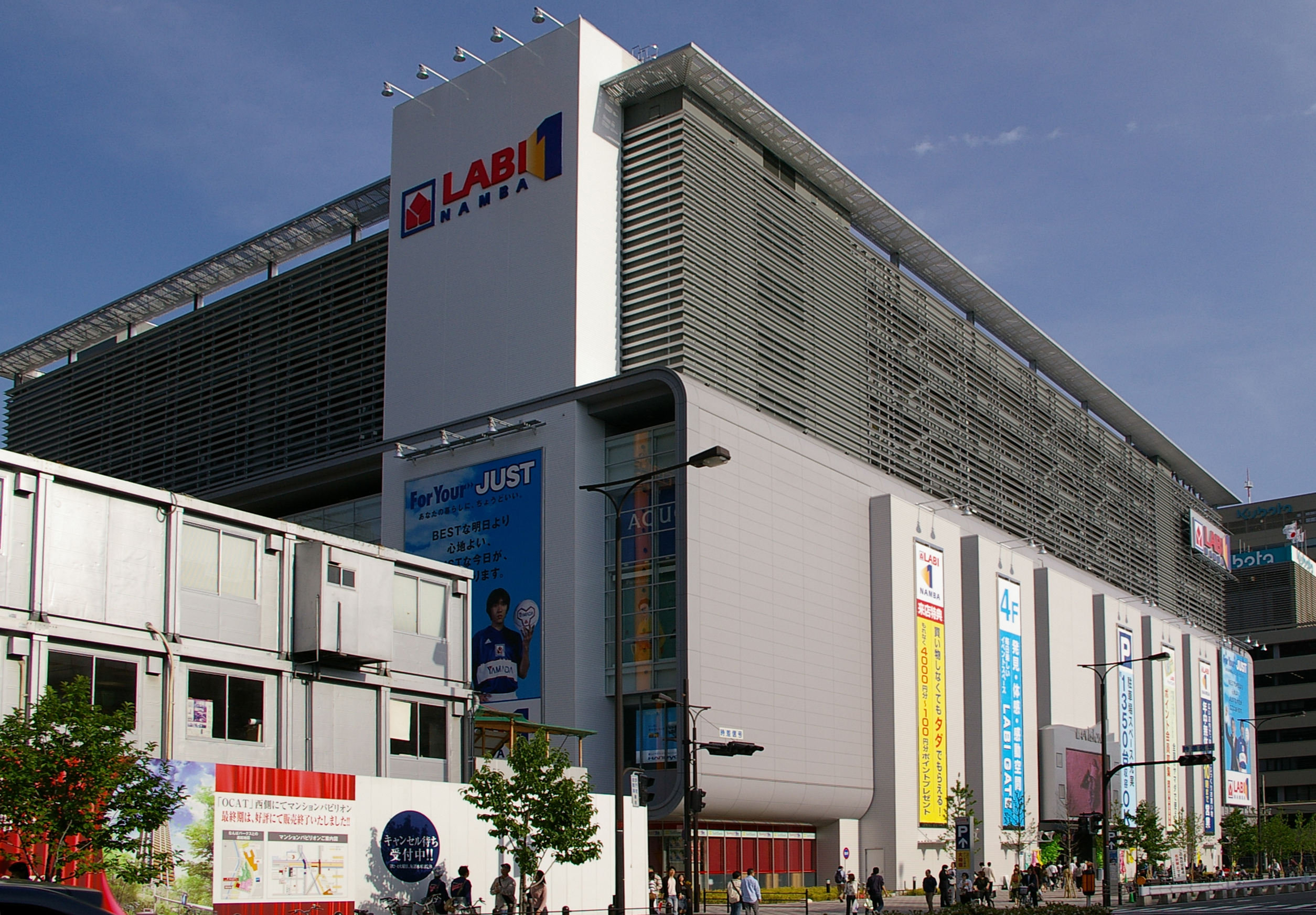
LABI1 Namba, the first downtown-style megastore of Yamada Denki, in Naniwa-ku, Osaka, Japan

Yamada-Denki Co., Ltd. (株式会社ヤマダデンキ, Kabushiki gaisha Yamada Denki) is one of the largest consumer electronics retailer chains in Japan.

== Overview ==
The company was founded in 1973 as a privately owned store. Yamada Denki Co., Ltd. was established in 1983. The current corporation was created on May 21, 1987, by a merger with the dormant company Nihon Densen Kōgyō Kabushiki-gaisha (日本電線工業株式会社) "Japan Electrical Wiring Industries", founded in 1978, via a change in the face value of the stock, and a change in the company name (to Kabushiki-gaisha Yamada Denki). Yamada Denki is listed in the first division of the Tokyo Stock Exchange, and the location of its head office is 1-1 Sakae-cho, Takasaki, Gunma. In February 2005, the company achieved sales figures of 1 trillion yen, making it the first specialist retailer in Japan to do so.

At the end of 2004, the company had 223 directly run stores across Japan, and 33 stores owned by subsidiaries, a total of 256 stores. It aims to expand further by branching out into small-scale retail and retail in the areas close to train stations. With the opening of the Tecc Land Tokushima Aizumi store in Aizumi, Tokushima Prefecture, on July 29, 2005, it became the first consumer electronics retailer to have stores in every prefecture in Japan.

There is a strong rivalry between Yamada Denki and Kojima, another major retailer of consumer electronics, with its head office in the neighboring prefecture of Tochigi, in Utsunomiya. Sales competition between the two has often caused sparks to fly, and sometimes disputes have ended up in court. There have been fierce battles for shop sales and store locations with other companies in the same industry, and in every store location "consumer electronics wars" named after the local area have broken out. In Shizuoka, in June 2005, Yamada Denki made news by opening a store next to the Kojima store on National Route 1, Suruga-ku, which was of the same scale. There are several other stores next to Kojima stores. In Kumagaya, Saitama Prefecture, despite having a store at some distance from the Kojima store, Yamada Denki opened a new store in the building vacated by Maruetsu, right in front of Kojima's nose, while keeping their existing store open. Kojima then opened a "New Kumagaya store", more than twice the size, renovating it using the scrap-and-build method. Since the 1990s, competition between the stores has been so tight that other rivals are unable to come close. At one point during the time when it was called Gigas Kansai, Gigas opened a store, but was quickly forced to withdraw. In Kōriyama, Fukushima, Kojima and Best Denki used to have stores at the same crossroads, but Best Denki withdrew, and Kojima reopened its New Murayama store, which had been closed, increasing its area several times using the scrap-and-build method. The competition in the consumer electronics field is still continuing at present.

Before Yamada Denki brought in its point system, it set up an experimental store to test the system, using the name "Digital 21" rather than "Tecc Land", in Adachi-ku and Okayama Prefecture. In Okayama, a Tecc Land store was closed and renovated to turn it into the Digital 21 Okayama store.

Groups including Shoten Kumiai (日本書店商業組合連合会, Nihon Shoten Shōgyō Kumiai Rengōkai), a trade union composed of booksellers from across Japan, have expressed the opinion that issuing points for books, and selling books using points, is an infringement of the resale price maintenance system, and requested that the redemption rate of the points (currently 3%) be lowered. When points were introduced, the rate for books was 5%, but it was later lowered to 3%.

In June 2004, the main Hiroshima store was opened in the central district of Hiroshima, partly as a test run for a city-based store. Based on the know-how acquired from this test, "LABI1 Namba" was opened in 2006. The opening hours of the main Hiroshima store and LABI1 Namba are from 10 a.m. to 10 p.m., the longest of any Yamada Denki stores in the country.

In August 2005, the company bought land in front of the east exit of Takasaki Station through Shimizu Corporation. This was scheduled to be completed in 2007, becoming the location of a large city store and new company headquarters. A plan to build the store in the Minato Mirai 21 area of Yokohama, but the plan was changed, apparently because the Yokohama city government expressed concerns about traffic congestion in the area.

In November 2005, Yamada Denki, together with the Kagawa Prefecture supermarket Marunaka, and the electrical goods retailer "Dynamite", also from Kagawa, founded "Chūgoku / Shikoku Tecc Land". Dynamite was transformed into a franchise, and its major stores were changed to Tecc Land stores. The result, in practice, was the acquisition of Dynamite.

In April 2010, Yamada Denki opened its LAB1 Shinjuku Higashiguchi Building branch in the Yunika Building, which is best known for its giant "Yunika Vision" video screen. The branch closed on October 4, 2020. The building was left vacant until April 2022, when sporting goods chain Alpen Tokyo turned it into its flagship store.

The company has used actor Masanobu Takashima and soccer player Shunsuke Nakamura for publicity and television commercials.

In 2015, the store closed 40 of its stores, mostly in suburban areas, after experiencing a 50% fall in net profits.

On October 1, 2020, Yamada Denki changed its trade name to "YAMADA HOLDINGS CO., LTD." and changed to a holding company structure.

== History ==
- 1973 - Noboru Yamada left JVC to start his own business.
- 1983 - Yamada Denki Co., Ltd. founded.
- 1989 - Listed on JASDAQ.
- 1996 - Started business as internet service provider.
- September 2000 - Promoted to the first section of the Tokyo Stock Exchange.
- 2002 - Acquired Daikuma from Ito Yokado as a subsidiary.
- 2004 - Opened Tecc Land Gushikawa store in Gushikawa (now Uruma), Okinawa.
- 2004 - Yamada Denki's first city-based store, the main Hiroshima store, opened.
- 2004 - Invests in Kouziro Co., Ltd., owner of Shopland PC.
- February 25, 2005 - Became the first Japanese specialist store or consumer electronics store to record consolidated sales in excess of 1 trillion yen.
- July 29, 2005 - With the opening of the Tecc Land Tokushima Aizumi branch, succeeded in opening a store in every prefecture in Japan.
- March 10, 2006 - Opened the first city store adjacent to a terminus, LABI1 Namba, 700m south of Namba Station in Naniwa-ku, Osaka.
- November 21, 2006 - Entered a business alliance (and capital alliance) with a Kyūshū-based consumer electronics retailer, Shōichi Denki (株式会社正一電気). The companies plan to found a joint venture, Kyūshū Tecc Land, by February 2007.
- 2007–present - Opened a city store in front of the east exit of Takasaki Station in Takasaki, Gunma, and moved the company headquarters, currently in Maebashi, to the new Takasaki store.
- 2020 - Opened new stores in Tokyo and Osaka selling both home electrical appliances and high-end furniture from Otsuka Kagu Ltd.
- 2021-Will release new Kotsau products in stores nationwide

== Companies in the group ==
- Daikuma (株式会社ダイクマ) - a discount store in the southern Kantō area.
- Minami Kyūshū Yamada Denki Co., Ltd. (南九州ヤマダ電機株式会社)
- Okinawa Yamada Denki Co., Ltd. (株式会社沖縄ヤマダ電機)
- Kansai Yamada Denki Co., Ltd. (株式会社関西ヤマダ電機)
- Chūgoku / Shikoku Tecc Land (株式会社中四国テックランド)
- Cosmos Berry's (コスモス・ベリーズ株式会社)
