= Best Denki =

Japanese electronics retailer

Best Denki Co., Ltd.
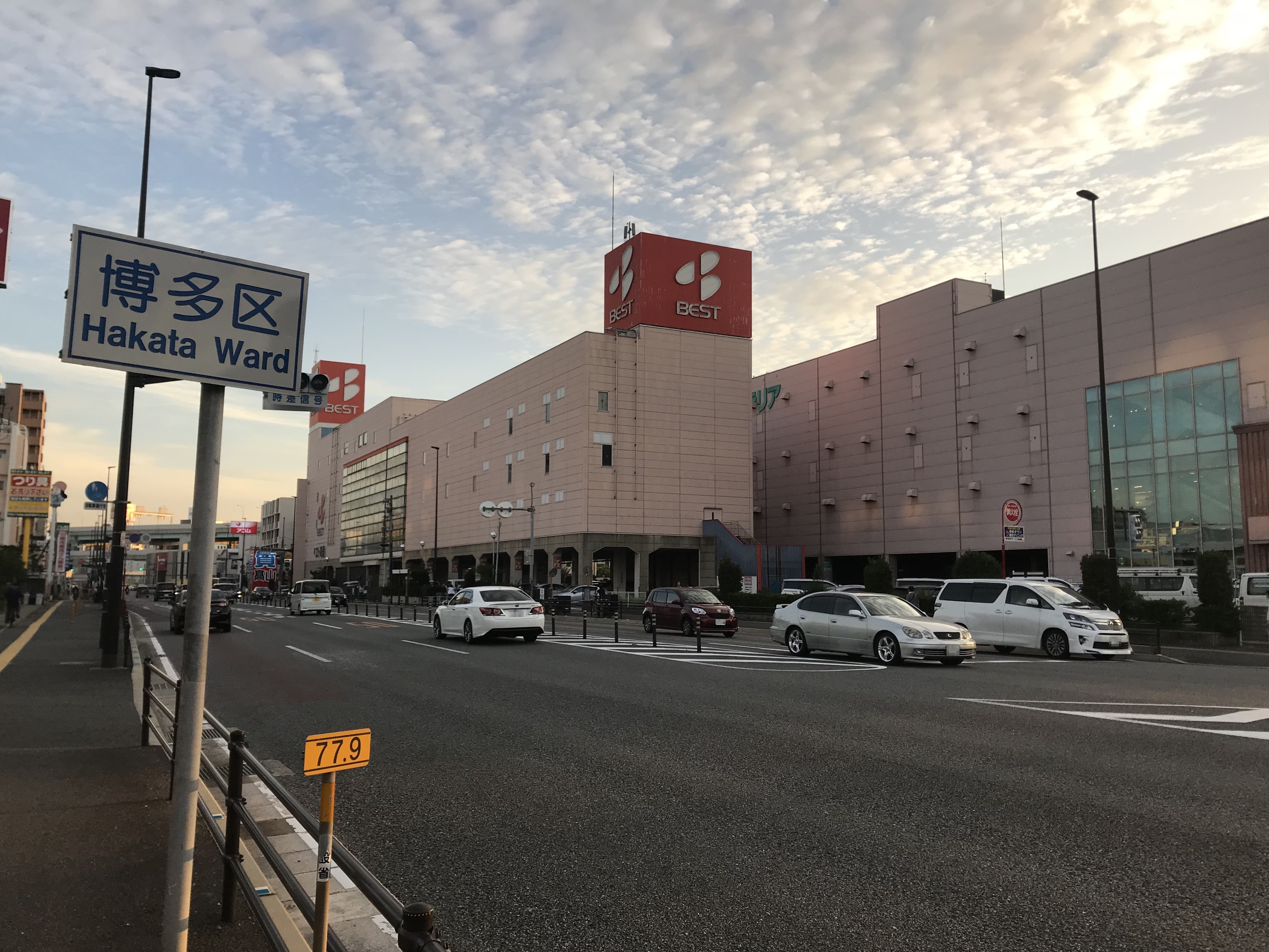
- Best Denki headquarters at Fukuoka, Japan.
- Native name: 株式会社ベスト電器
- Romanized name: Kabushiki gaisha Besuto Denki
- Company type: Private KK; Subsidiary of Yamada Denki
- Traded as: TYO: 8175; FSE: 8175; Delisted June 2017
- Industry: Retailing
- Founded: September 3, 1953; 72 years ago
- Headquarters: Fukuoka, Japan
- Area served: East and Southeast Asia
- Key people: Koji Ono (President & CEO)
- Products: Electronic products
- Revenue: ▲¥588,596 million (FY2017)
- Operating income: ▲¥350,923 million (FY2017)
- Net income: ▲¥13,930,982 million (FY2017)
- Total assets: ▲¥10,333,840 million (FY2017)
- Total equity: ▲¥6,742,595 million (FY2017)
- Number of employees: ▲19,238 (FY2017)
- Parent: Yamada Denki
- Subsidiaries: Denki Pte. Ltd (Singapore)
- Website: http://www.bestdenki.ne.jp

The Best Denki Co., Ltd. (株式会社ベスト電器, Kabushiki-gaisha Besuto Denki) is a Japanese electronics retailer with outlets across Japan, Singapore, Indonesia and Malaysia. It operated in Hong Kong and Taiwan from the late 1980s until 2011 and 2017 respectively.

Best Denki's headquarters is located in Fukuoka. Previously, in Singapore and Hong Kong, it was known as "Yaohan Best", when it started operations there in 1985. After Yaohan's bankruptcy, the store was changed to its current name. The store also operates a service sector that does repair, transportation of goods and after sale service for its franchise stores.

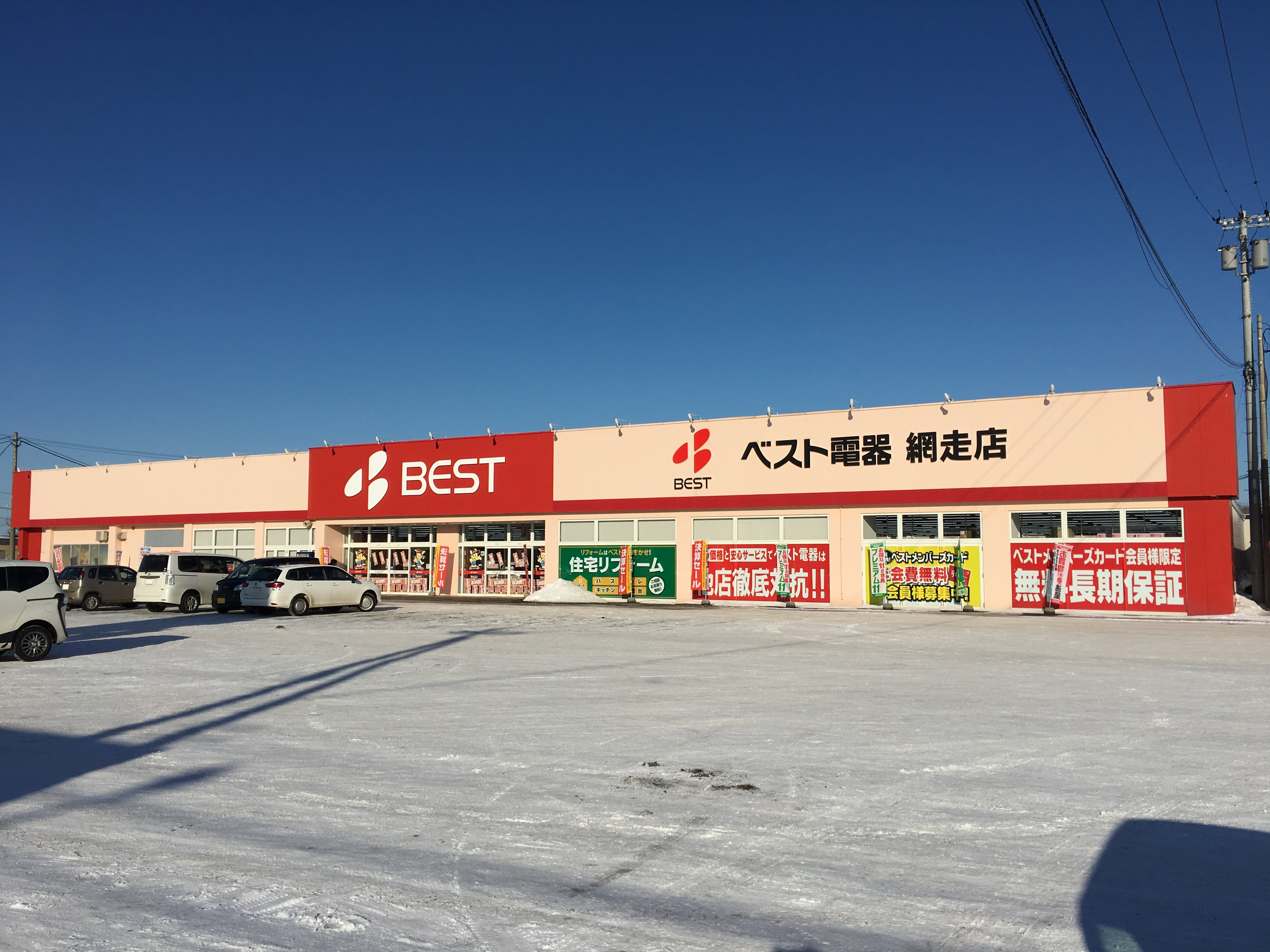
Best Denki store at Abashiri, Hokkaido, Japan.

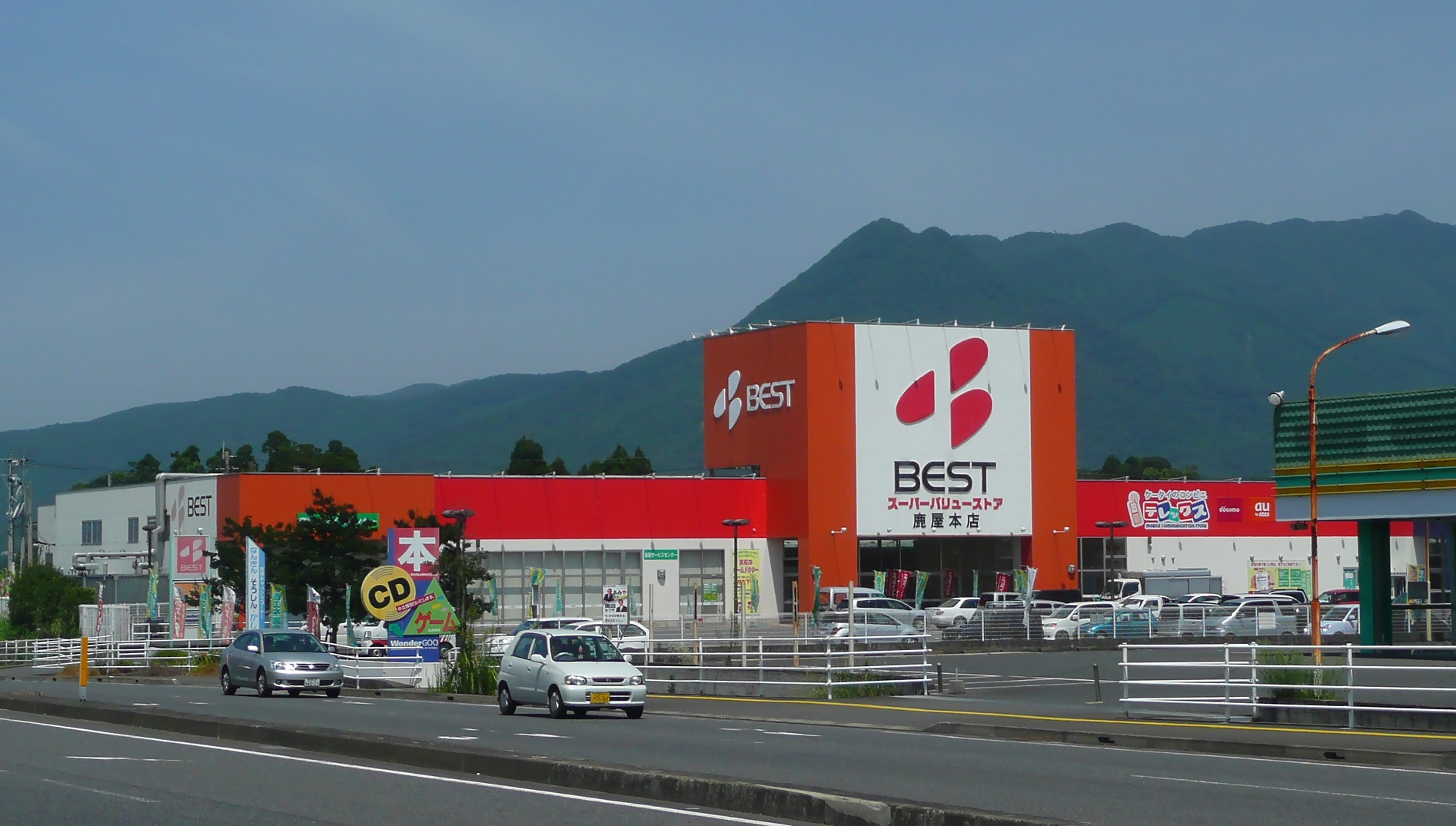
Best Denki store at Kagoshima, Japan in 2009.

== International locations ==
=== Hong Kong ===
Best Denki entered Hong Kong's market during the later half of the 1980s, and operated within Yaohan store's electronic department under the name Yaohan Best. When Yaohan declared bankruptcy in 1997, it was spared from liquidation since all the goods and products in the department are owned by Best Denki. Their stores in New Town Plaza and Tuen Mun Town Plaza were allowed to continue their operation on their original locations. However since 1 June 2011, all of Best Denki's business in the territory was acquired by Suning Citicall (which later became Suning Appliance).

- Megabox, Kowloon Bay (flagship store, sized 2787m^{2}, taken over by Suning Citicall in 2011)
- Olympian City, Tai Kok Tsui, West Kowloon (taken over by Suning Citicall in 2011)
- Plaza Hollywood, Diamond Hill (closed)
- Tuen Mun Town Plaza, Tuen Mun (taken over by Suning Citicall in 2011)
- Discovery Park (taken over by Suning Citicall in 2011)

=== Indonesia ===
The Best Denki stores in Indonesia are franchised by PT. Pasaraya Nusakarya of Denki Pte. Ltd of Singapore.

The first Best Denki store in Indonesia was opened within the Jakarta Seibu building of Mega Pasaraya (now Pasaraya Blok M) in 1995. It was also opened in Pasaraya Sultan Agung (now Pasaraya Manggarai) and in Wisma Kyoei (now Wisma Keiai). All of the stores (under the name The Best Connection) closed in 1998-1999 due to the Asian financial crisis. However it returned in 2007.

=== Malaysia ===
There are seven Best Denki stores in Malaysia.

=== Singapore ===
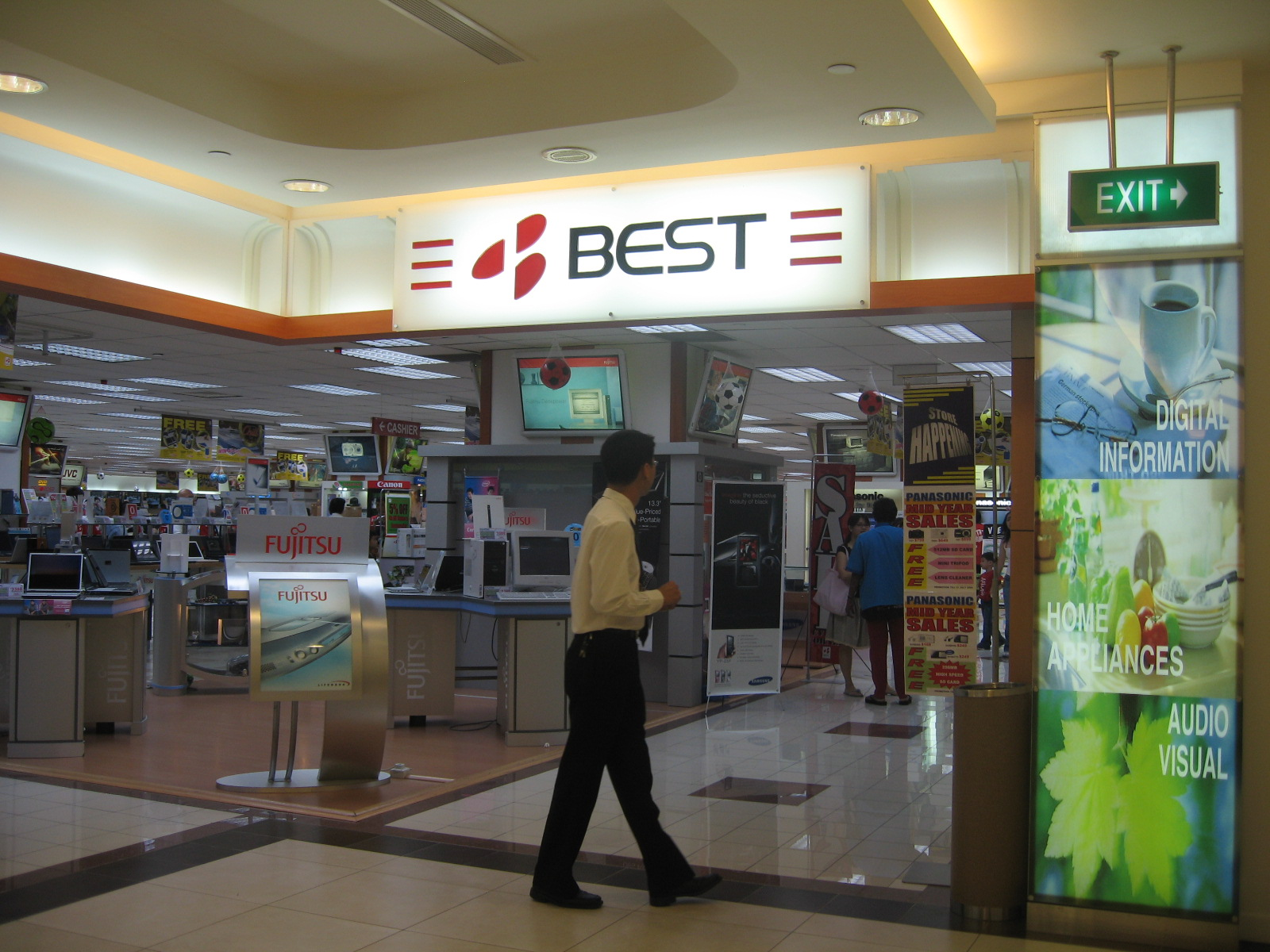
Best Denki store at Ngee Ann City, Singapore in 2006.

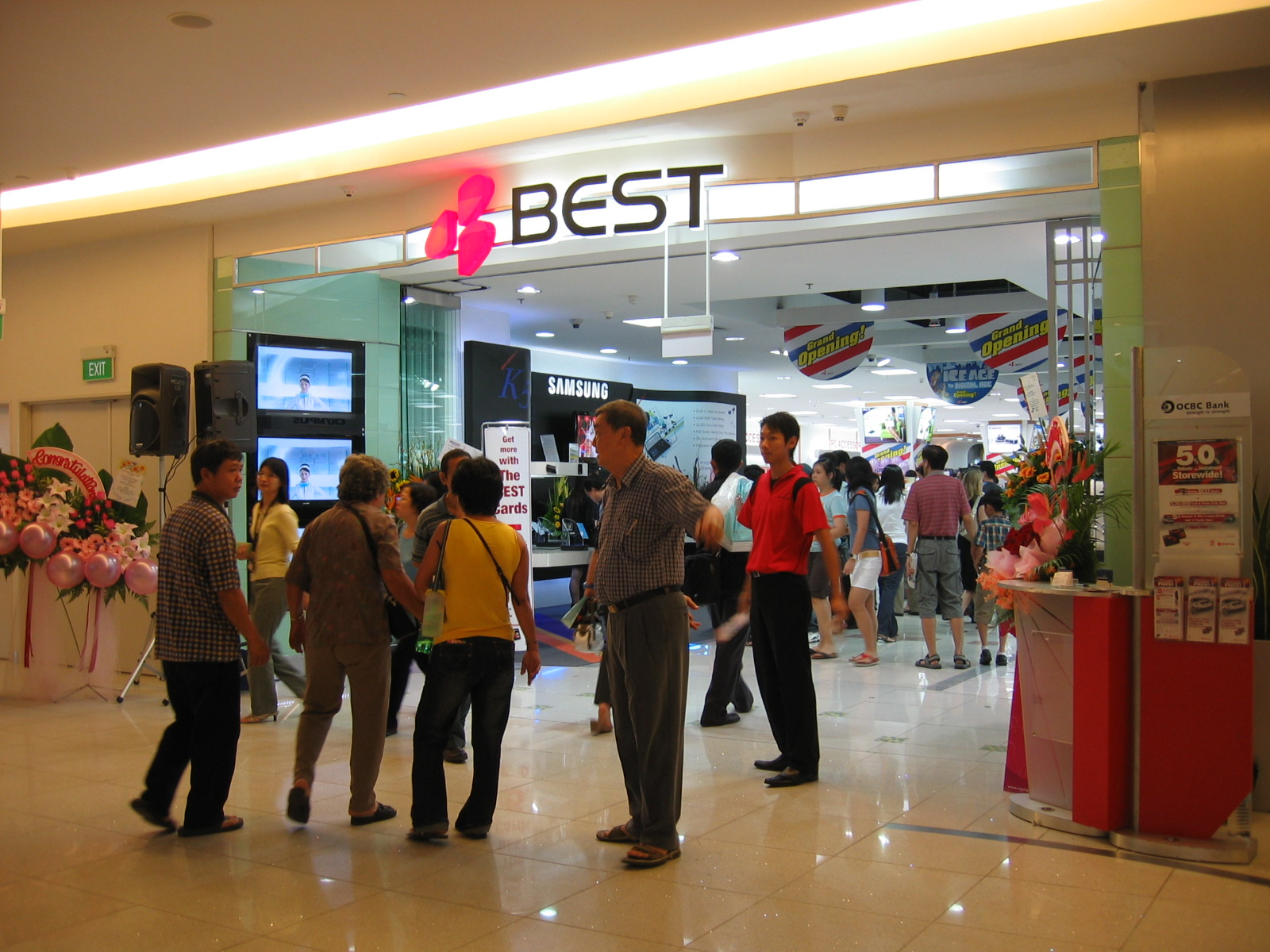
Best Denki store at Vivo City, Singapore.

Best Denki's first store outside Japan was located in Singapore, which opened in 1982. As of 2019, There are thirteen stores in Singapore, the largest number of stores outside Japan, with the flagship store located at Ngee Ann City.
