= 2025 J.League Cup =

2025 JリーグYBCルヴァンカップ

Tournament details
- Country: Japan
- Dates: 20 March – 1 November
- Teams: 60

Final positions
- Champions: Sanfrecce Hiroshima (2nd title)
- Runners-up: Kashiwa Reysol

Tournament statistics
- Matches played: 65
- Goals scored: 185 (2.85 per match)
- Attendance: 528,120 (8,125 per match)
- Top goal scorer(s): Yuki Kakita (5 goals)

The 2025 J.League Cup, known as the 2025 J.League YBC Levain Cup (Japanese: 2025 JリーグYBCルヴァンカップ) for sponsorship reasons, was the 33rd edition of J.League Cup, a Japanese association football cup competition. It was the second season all 60 J.League clubs participate in the League Cup. Defending champions Nagoya Grampus, having won their second title in 2024, were eliminated in the Group 7 second round.

== Format ==
All clubs from the 2025 season's J1, J2, and J3 League participated. The tournament was divided into three sections each with a different format: the first round, the play-off round and the prime round.

First round

A total of 55 clubs took part in the first round, split into 7 groups. Four clubs were introduced in the prime round; three clubs participating in the 2024–25 AFC Champions League Elite knockout stage (Kawasaki Frontale, Yokohama F. Marinos and Vissel Kobe) and one club participating in the 2025 FIFA Club World Cup (Urawa Red Diamonds). Each group and their respective clubs participates in a single-elimination tournament, leaving seven clubs to advance to the play-off round, where they were joined by 2024–25 AFC Champions League Two quarter-finalists Sanfrecce Hiroshima. The draw for the first round was based on rankings from the 2024 league season.

As a general rule, the lower league club played their fixture at home. In the case of clubs being in the same league, the club with the lower ranking from the 2023 season served as the home team. In the case of a draw, games go to extra time and penalties to determine a winner if necessary.

The first round groups were as follows:

Teams participating in the first round of the 2025 J.League Cup
Group	Teams							
1	Machida Zelvia (J1 3rd)	Yokohama FC (J2 2nd)	Fagiano Okayama (J2 5th)	Fujieda MYFC (J2 13th)	Ventforet Kofu (J2 14th)	Giravanz Kitakyushu (J3 7th)	FC Gifu (J3 8th)	–
2	Gamba Osaka (J1 4th)	Shimizu S-Pulse (J2 1st)	Júbilo Iwata (J1 18th)	Roasso Kumamoto (J2 12th)	Mito HollyHock (J2 15th)	FC Osaka (J3 6th)	SC Sagamihara (J3 9th)	Kochi United (JFL 2nd)
3	Kashima Antlers (J1 5th)	Kashiwa Reysol (J1 17th)	Consadole Sapporo (J1 19th)	Renofa Yamaguchi (J2 11th)	Oita Trinita (J2 16th)	Fukushima United (J3 5th)	Azul Claro Numazu (J3 10th)	Tochigi City (JFL 1st)
4	Tokyo Verdy (J1 6th)	Albirex Niigata (J1 16th)	Sagan Tosu (J1 20th)	Blaublitz Akita (J2 10th)	Ehime FC (J2 17th)	Matsumoto Yamaga (J3 4th)	Vanraure Hachinohe (J3 11th)	Nagano Parceiro (J3 18th)
5	FC Tokyo (J1 7th)	Shonan Bellmare (J1 15th)	Nagano Parceiro (J2 3rd)	Iwaki FC (J2 9th)	Omiya Ardija (J3 1st)	Thespa Gunma (J2 20th)	Zweigen Kanazawa (J3 12th)	Nara Club (J3 17th)
6	Cerezo Osaka (J1 10th)	Kyoto Sanga (J1 14th)	Montedio Yamagata (J2 4th)	Tokushima Vortis (J2 8th)	FC Imabari (J3 2nd)	Kagoshima United FC (J2 19th)	Gainare Tottori (J3 13th)	Kamatamare Sanuki (J3 16th)
7	Nagoya Grampus (J1 1st)	Avispa Fukuoka (J1 12th)	Vegalta Sendai (J2 6th)	JEF United Chiba (J2 7th)	Kataller Toyama (J3 3rd)	Tochigi SC (J2 18th)	FC Ryukyu (J3 14th)	Tegevajaro Miyazaki (J3 15th)

Notes

Teams in italic participated in their first J.League Cup tournament.

Playoff round

The seven clubs that qualified from the first round alongside new entrant Sanfrecce Hiroshima, qualified to the round as an AFC Champions League Two club, will be drawn into four, two-legged fixtures and would play each other home and away. The remaining four clubs would advance to the prime round.

Prime round

A single-elimination tournament would be held between eight clubs: the four clubs that qualified from the playoff round plus the AFC Champions League Elite clubs — Kawasaki Frontale, Yokohama F. Marinos, and Vissel Kobe. Each round would be a two-legged home and away fixture, except the final which would be a one-game tie played at a neutral venue. The draw for the brackets will be held some time after the completion of previous rounds.

== Schedule ==
The schedule was announced on 20 December 2024.

Stage	Round	Date
First round	Round 1	20–26 March
First round	Round 2	9–16 April
First round	Round 3	21 May
Playoff round		4 June (First leg); 8 June (Second leg)
Prime round	Quarter-finals	3 September (First leg); 7 September (Second leg)
Prime round	Semi-finals	10 October (First leg); 12 October (Second leg)
Prime round	Final	1 November

== First round ==
=== Group 1 ===
Round 1
26 March – Kofu
Ventforet Kofu	2
Fujieda MYFC	1
20 March – Gifu
FC Gifu	0
Yokohama FC	2
20 March – Kitakyushu
Giravanz Kitakyushu	1
Fagiano Okayama	0

Round 2
9 April – Kofu
Ventforet Kofu	0
Machida Zelvia	1
16 April – Kitakyushu
Giravanz Kitakyushu	1
Yokohama FC	2

Round 3
21 May – Yokohama
Yokohama FC	1
Machida Zelvia	1

26 March 2025 Round 1	Ventforet Kofu (2)	2–1	(2) Fujieda MYFC	Kofu
19:00	Tanaka 45'; Naito 52'	Report	Anderson 90'	Stadium: JIT Recycle Ink Stadium; Attendance: 3,535; Referee: Shu Kawamata

20 March 2025 Round 1	FC Gifu (3)	0–2	(1) Yokohama FC	Gifu
14:00		Report	Nakano 27'; Komazawa 37'	Stadium: Gifu Nagaragawa Stadium; Attendance: 2,846; Referee: Naoto Uehara

20 March 2025 Round 1	Giravanz Kitakyushu (3)	1–0	(1) Fagiano Okayama	Kitakyushu
14:03	Hirahara 19'	Report		Stadium: Mikuni World Stadium Kitakyushu; Attendance: 4,638; Referee: Hiroyuki Kimura

9 April 2025 Round 2	Ventforet Kofu (2)	0–1	(1) Machida Zelvia	Kofu
19:00		Report	Sento 45+2'	Stadium: JIT Recycle Ink Stadium; Attendance: 4,899; Referee: Keigo Sendachi

16 April 2025 Round 2	Giravanz Kitakyushu (3)	1–2	(1) Yokohama FC	Kitakyushu
19:00	Watanabe 54'	Report	Komazawa 11'; Sakamoto 49' (o.g.)	Stadium: Mikuni World Stadium Kitakyushu; Attendance: 3,719; Referee: Yudai Yamamoto

21 May 2025 Round 3	Yokohama FC (1)	1–1 (a.e.t.) (3–1 p)	(1) Machida Zelvia	Yokohama
18:30	Ogawa 84'	Report	Fujio 12'	Stadium: Nippatsu Mitsuzawa Stadium; Attendance: 3,203; Referee: Martin Petersen (Germany)
	Penalties
	Ogawa (penalty scored); Fukumori (penalty scored); Mori (penalty scored)		(penalty missed) Sento; (penalty missed) Shoji; (penalty scored) Byron Vásquez; (penalty missed) Okamura

=== Group 2 ===
Round 1
20 March – Kochi
Kochi United	1
Gamba Osaka	2
26 March – Mito
Mito HollyHock	1
Roasso Kumamoto	0
26 March – Sagamihara
SC Sagamihara	1
Shimizu S-Pulse	3
26 March – Higashiosaka
FC Osaka	1
Júbilo Iwata	2

Round 2
16 April – Mito
Mito HollyHock	0
Gamba Osaka	1
9 April – Iwata
Júbilo Iwata	2
Shimizu S-Pulse	1

Round 3
21 May – Iwata
Júbilo Iwata	2
Gamba Osaka	1

20 March 2025 Round 1	Kochi United (3)	1–2	(1) Gamba Osaka	Kochi
14:00	Kobayashi 77'	Report	Usami 13'; Toyama 41'	Stadium: Kochi Haruno Athletic Stadium; Attendance: 6,929; Referee: Futoshi Nakamura

26 March 2025 Round 1	Mito HollyHock (2)	1–0	(2) Roasso Kumamoto	Mito
19:00	Ando 30'	Report		Stadium: K's denki Stadium Mito; Attendance: 1,998; Referee: Takuto Okabe

26 March 2025 Round 1	SC Sagamihara (3)	1–3	(1) Shimizu S-Pulse	Sagamihara
18:00	Takeuchi 90+4'	Report	Nakashio 30'; Kitazume 83'; Doi 85'	Stadium: Sagamihara Gion Stadium; Attendance: 3,993; Referee: Naoto Uehara

26 March 2025 Round 1	FC Osaka (3)	1–2	(2) Júbilo Iwata	Higashiosaka
19:00	Nishimura 22'	Report	Sato 2'; Kawai 52'	Stadium: Hanazono Rugby Stadium; Attendance: 3,941; Referee: Atsushi Kamimura

16 April 2025 Round 2	Mito HollyHock (2)	0–1 (a.e.t.)	(1) Gamba Osaka	Mito
19:00		Report	Juan Alano 94'	Stadium: K's denki Stadium Mito; Attendance: 3,331; Referee: Yoshimi Yamashita

9 April 2025 Round 2	Júbilo Iwata (2)	2–1	(1) Shimizu S-Pulse	Iwata
19:00	Kawasaki 53'; Ricardo Graça 80'	Report	Ahmedov 1'	Stadium: Yamaha Stadium; Attendance: 12,533; Referee: Koei Koya

21 May 2025 Round 3	Júbilo Iwata (2)	2–1 (a.e.t.)	(1) Gamba Osaka	Iwata
19:00	Sato 80'; Yoshimura 110'	Report	Hümmet 43'	Stadium: Yamaha Stadium; Attendance: 6,929; Referee: Naoto Uehara

=== Group 3 ===
Round 1
20 March – Tochigi
Tochigi City	0
Kashima Antlers	1
26 March – Oita
Oita Trinita	2
Renofa Yamaguchi	3
20 March – Numazu
Azul Claro Numazu	0
Kashiwa Reysol	1
26 March – Fukushima
Fukushima United	6
Consadole Sapporo	3

Round 2
9 April – Yamaguchi
Renofa Yamaguchi	1
Kashima Antlers	1
16 April – Fukushima
Fukushima United	2
Kashiwa Reysol	3

Round 3
21 May – Yamaguchi
Renofa Yamaguchi	0
Kashiwa Reysol	2

20 March 2025 Round 1	Tochigi City (3)	0–1	(1) Kashima Antlers	Tochigi
14:00		Report	Nono 69'	Stadium: City Football Station; Attendance: 4,532; Referee: Koei Koya

26 March 2025 Round 1	Oita Trinita (2)	2–3	(2) Renofa Yamaguchi	Oita
19:00	Kim Hyun-woo 78'; Yashiki 80'	Report	Suenaga 31'; Furukawa 67', 69'	Stadium: Crasus Dome Oita; Attendance: 3,164; Referee: Shuhei Ishimaru

20 March 2025 Round 1	Azul Claro Numazu (3)	0–1	(1) Kashiwa Reysol	Numazu
14:00		Report	Nakama 8'	Stadium: Ashitaka Park Stadium; Attendance: 4,406; Referee: Atsushi Kamimura

26 March 2025 Round 1	Fukushima United (3)	6–3 (a.e.t.)	(2) Consadole Sapporo	Fukushima
19:00	Ishii 26'; Mori 50'; Uehata 74', 95'; Jojo 91'; Toma 111'	Report	Arano 8'; Izuma 21'; Nakashima 60'	Stadium: Toho Minna no Stadium; Attendance: 945; Referee: Kazuyoshi Enomoto

9 April 2025 Round 2	Renofa Yamaguchi (2)	1–1 (a.e.t.) (5–3 p)	(1) Kashima Antlers	Yamaguchi
19:00	Ozawa 64'	Report	Morooka 81'	Stadium: Ishin Me-Life Stadium; Attendance: 4,689; Referee: Takuto Okabe
	Penalties
	Furukawa (penalty scored); Yamamoto (penalty scored); Naruoka (penalty scored); Noyori (penalty scored); Tanabe (penalty scored)		(penalty scored) Léo Ceará; (penalty missed) Shibasaki; (penalty scored) Ueda; (penalty scored) Koike

16 April 2025 Round 2	Fukushima United (3)	2–3	(1) Kashiwa Reysol	Fukushima
19:00	Yajima 45', 45+2'	Report	Diego 5'; Toshima 19'; Watai 83'	Stadium: Toho Minna no Stadium; Attendance: 1,808; Referee: Koichiro Fukushima

21 May 2025 Round 3	Renofa Yamaguchi (2)	0–2	(1) Kashiwa Reysol	Yamaguchi
19:00		Report	Nakagawa 69'; Nakama 80'	Stadium: Ishin Me-Life Stadium; Attendance: 3,345; Referee: Hayato Shimizu

=== Group 4 ===
Round 1
20 March – Nagano
Nagano Parceiro	0
Tokyo Verdy	0
26 March – Matsuyama
Ehime FC	0
Blaublitz Akita	2
20 March – Hachinohe
Vanraure Hachinohe	1
Albirex Niigata	1
26 March – Matsumoto
Matsumoto Yamaga	1
Sagan Tosu	0

Round 2
16 April – Akita
Blaublitz Akita	1
Tokyo Verdy	2
9 April – Matsumoto
Matsumoto Yamaga	0
Albirex Niigata	2

Round 3
21 May – Niigata
Albirex Niigata	0
Tokyo Verdy	2

20 March 2025 Round 1	Nagano Parceiro (3)	0–0 (a.e.t.) (4–5 p)	(1) Tokyo Verdy	Nagano
14:00		Report		Stadium: Nagano U Stadium; Attendance: 5,976; Referee: Elliot Bell (England)
	Penalties
	Ando (penalty scored); Hasegawa (penalty missed); Ito (penalty missed); Kondo (penalty scored); Yamanaka (penalty scored); Tomita (penalty scored); Higuchi (penalty missed)		(penalty missed) Shirai; (penalty missed) Saito; (penalty scored) Meshino; (penalty scored) Onaga; (penalty scored) Taniguchi; (penalty scored) Matsuhashi; (penalty scored) Inami

26 March 2025 Round 1	Ehime FC (2)	0–2	(2) Blaublitz Akita	Matsuyama
19:00		Report	Suzuki 43'; Scalese 82' (o.g.)	Stadium: Ningineer Stadium; Attendance: 1,701; Referee: Keigo Sendachi

20 March 2025 Round 1	Vanraure Hachinohe (3)	1–1 (a.e.t.) (2–4 p)	(1) Albirex Niigata	Hachinohe
13:00	Chikaishi 44'	Report	Komi 8'	Stadium: Prifoods Stadium; Attendance: 3,124; Referee: Yudai Yamamoto
	Penalties
	Nakano (penalty missed); Senoo (penalty scored); Sato (penalty missed); Yukie (penalty scored)		(penalty missed) Takagi; (penalty scored) Ota; (penalty scored) Akiyama; (penalty scored) Miyamoto; (penalty scored) Horigome

26 March 2025 Round 1	Matsumoto Yamaga (3)	1–0 (a.e.t.)	(2) Sagan Tosu	Matsumoto
19:00	Tanaka 94'	Report		Stadium: Sunpro Alwin; Attendance: 3,891; Referee: Daichi Shiino

16 April 2025 Round 2	Blaublitz Akita (2)	1–2 (a.e.t.)	(1) Tokyo Verdy	Akita
19:00	Ishida 33'	Report	Kimura 90+2'; Fukuda 118'	Stadium: Soyu Stadium; Attendance: 1,519; Referee: Hayato Shimizu

9 April 2025 Round 2	Matsumoto Yamaga (1)	0–2	(1) Albirex Niigata	Matsumoto
19:00		Report	Kasai 19'; Okumura 63'	Stadium: Sunpro Alwin; Attendance: 4,650; Referee: Naoto Uehara

21 May 2025 Round 3	Albirex Niigata (1)	0–2	(1) Tokyo Verdy	Niigata
19:00		Report	Kimura 7'; Kawasaki 32'	Stadium: Denka Big Swan Stadium; Attendance: 8,416; Referee: Koki Nagamine

=== Group 5 ===
Round 1
20 March – Nara
Nara Club	0
FC Tokyo	1
26 March – Saitama
RB Omiya Ardija	3
Iwaki FC	3
20 March – Kanazawa
Zweigen Kanazawa	0
Shonan Bellmare	1
26 March – Maebashi
Thespa Gunma	1
V-Varen Nagasaki	4

Round 2
16 April – Saitama
RB Omiya Ardija	1
FC Tokyo	3
9 April – Nagasaki
V-Varen Nagasaki	1
Shonan Bellmare	2

Round 3
21 May – Hiratsuka
Shonan Bellmare	1
FC Tokyo	0

20 March 2025 Round 1	Nara Club (3)	0–1	(1) FC Tokyo	Nara
14:00		Report	Anzai 90+5'	Stadium: Rohto Field Nara; Attendance: 4,497; Referee: Yoshiro Imamura

26 March 2025 Round 1	RB Omiya Ardija (2)	3–3 (a.e.t.) (7–6 p)	(2) Iwaki FC	Saitama
19:00	Sunday 40'; Urakami 89'; Tomiyama 99'	Report	Ishiwatari 16', 58'; Kase 102'	Stadium: NACK5 Stadium Omiya; Attendance: 4,850; Referee: Yoshikazu Matsuzawa
	Penalties
	Abe (penalty scored); Fabián González (penalty scored); Tomiyama (penalty missed); Nakano (penalty scored); Urakami (penalty scored); Ishikawa (penalty scored); Fukui (penalty scored); Yasumitsu (penalty scored)		(penalty scored) Ishiwatari; (penalty missed) Kofie; (penalty scored) Shibata; (penalty scored) Sakagishi; (penalty scored) Yamada; (penalty scored) Yamauchi; (penalty scored) Sakamoto; (penalty missed) Kato

20 March 2025 Round 1	Zweigen Kanazawa (3)	0–1	(1) Shonan Bellmare	Kanazawa
19:00		Report	Mori 75' (o.g.)	Stadium: Ishikawa Athletics Stadium; Attendance: 3,318; Referee: Harrison Blair (England)

26 March 2025 Round 1	Thespa Gunma (3)	1–4	(2) V-Varen Nagasaki	Maebashi
19:00	Onozeki 43'	Report	Marcos Guilherme 84', 112'; Nose 97' (o.g.); Masuyama 109'	Stadium: Shoda Shoyu Stadium Gunma; Attendance: 1,440; Referee: Reo Tanaka

16 April 2025 Round 2	RB Omiya Ardija (2)	1–3 (a.e.t.)	(1) FC Tokyo	Saitama
19:00	Sugimoto 82'	Report	Marcelo Ryan 56', 98', 105+1'	Stadium: NACK5 Stadium Omiya; Attendance: 8,001; Referee: Shu Kawamata

9 April 2025 Round 2	V-Varen Nagasaki (2)	1–2 (a.e.t.)	(1) Shonan Bellmare	Nagasaki
19:00	Nanamure 64'	Report	Luiz Phellype 34'; Suzuki 103'	Stadium: Peace Stadium Connected by SoftBank; Attendance: 5,848; Referee: Hiroki Kasahara

21 May 2025 Round 3	Shonan Bellmare (1)	1–0	(1) FC Tokyo	Hiratsuka
19:00	Hiraoka 82'	Report		Stadium: Lemon Gas Stadium Hiratsuka; Attendance: 6,490; Referee: Koichiro Fukushima

=== Group 6 ===
Round 1
9 April – Imabari
FC Imabari	2
Tokushima Vortis	1
20 March – Marugame
Kamatamare Sanuki	1
Cerezo Osaka	5
20 March – Tottori
Gainare Tottori	0
Kyoto Sanga	2
26 March – Kagoshima
Kagoshima United	0
Montedio Yamagata	2

Round 2
16 April – Imabari
FC Imabari	3
Cerezo Osaka	4
9 April – Yamagata
Montedio Yamagata	0
Kyoto Sanga	1

Round 3
21 May – Kyoto
Kyoto Sanga	1
Cerezo Osaka	4

20 March 2025 Round 1	Kamatamare Sanuki (3)	1–5	(1) Cerezo Osaka	Marugame
14:00	Hatanaka 48' (o.g.)	Report	Thiago Andrade 21'; Rafael Ratão 59'; Lucas Fernandes 74'; Vitor Bueno 77'; Uejo 84'	Stadium: Pikara Stadium; Attendance: 5,434; Referee: Hayato Shimizu

9 April 2025 Round 1	FC Imabari (2)	2–1	(2) Tokushima Vortis	Imabari
07:03	Hino 54'; Fujioka 64'	Report	Tsuboi 72'	Stadium: ASICS Satoyama Stadium; Attendance: 2,437; Referee: Tetsuro Yoshida
Note: The match was scheduled to be held on 20 March, but it was postponed to a later date due a forest fire in Imabari.

20 March 2025 Round 1	Gainare Tottori (3)	0–2	(1) Kyoto Sanga	Tottori
19:00		Report	Nakano 18'; Rafael Elias 71'	Stadium: Axis Bird Stadium; Attendance: 3,166; Referee: Akihiko Ikeuchi

26 March 2025 Round 1	Kagoshima United (3)	0–2	(2) Montedio Yamagata	Kagoshima
19:00		Report	Fujimoto 15'; Issaka 35'	Stadium: Shiranami Stadium; Attendance: 3,479; Referee: Toshihiro Nakai

16 April 2025 Round 2	FC Imabari (2)	3–4 (a.e.t.)	(1) Cerezo Osaka	Imabari
19:00	Takeuchi 32'; Fujioka 34'; Hino 48'	Report	Vitor Bueno 12'; Jaroensak 15'; Kagawa 80'; Okuda 118'	Stadium: ASICS Satoyama Stadium; Attendance: 4,148; Referee: Hiroyuki Kimura

9 April 2025 Round 2	Montedio Yamagata (2)	0–1	(1) Kyoto Sanga	Yamagata
19:00		Report	Nagata 45+1'	Stadium: ND Soft Stadium Yamagata; Attendance: 3,701; Referee: Yoshiro Imamura

21 May 2025 Round 3	Kyoto Sanga (1)	1–4	(1) Cerezo Osaka	Kyoto
19:00	Murilo Costa 10'	Report	Funaki 48'; Thiago Andrade 61', 73'; Rafael Ratão 81'	Stadium: Sanga Stadium by Kyocera; Attendance: 6,233; Referee: Florian Badstübner (Germany)

=== Group 7 ===
Round 1
20 March – Shintomi
Tegevajaro Miyazaki	0
Nagoya Grampus	3
26 March – Toyama
Kataller Toyama	4
JEF United Chiba	2
20 March – Okinawa
FC Ryukyu	0
Avispa Fukuoka	2
26 March – Utsunomiya
Tochigi SC	0
Vegalta Sendai	0

Round 2
16 April – Toyama
Kataller Toyama	1
Nagoya Grampus	1
16 April – Utsunomiya
Tochigi SC	1
Avispa Fukuoka	2

Round 3
21 May – Toyama
Kataller Toyama	1
Avispa Fukuoka	2

20 March 2025 Round 1	Tegevajaro Miyazaki (3)	0–3 (a.e.t.)	(1) Nagoya Grampus	Shintomi
14:00		Report	Kikuchi 98'; Asano 112', 120+1'	Stadium: Ichigo Miyazaki Shintomi Football Stadium; Attendance: 2,466; Referee: Masuya Ueda

26 March 2025 Round 1	Kataller Toyama (2)	4–2	(2) JEF United Chiba	Toyama
19:00	Sueki 5'; Usui 22', 52', 66'	Report	Taguchi 15'; Mae 62'	Stadium: Toyama Stadium; Attendance: 3,208; Referee: Genki Tawara

20 March 2025 Round 1	FC Ryukyu (3)	0–2	(1) Avispa Fukuoka	Okinawa
19:00		Report	Kitajima 58'; Konno 90'	Stadium: Tapic Kenso Hiyagon Stadium; Attendance: 3,686; Referee: Koichiro Fukushima

26 March 2025 Round 1	Tochigi SC (3)	0–0 (a.e.t.) (4–3 p)	(2) Vegalta Sendai	Utsunomiya
19:00		Report		Stadium: Tochigi Green Stadium; Attendance: 2,128; Referee: Yoshito Nakagawa
	Penalties
	Yano (penalty scored); Igarashi (penalty scored); Kobori (penalty missed); Kawana (penalty scored); Omori (penalty scored)		(penalty scored) Takada; (penalty missed) Nishimaru; (penalty scored) Nakada; (penalty missed) Onaiwu; (penalty scored) Matsui

16 April 2025 Round 2	Kataller Toyama (2)	1–1 (a.e.t.) (6–5 p)	(1) Nagoya Grampus	Toyama
19:00	Take 99'	Report	Mateus 101'	Stadium: Toyama Stadium; Attendance: 3,964; Referee: Yusuke Ohashi
	Penalties
	Take (penalty missed); Fuseya (penalty scored); Sueki (penalty scored); Ura (penalty scored); Kameda (penalty scored); Tagawa (penalty scored); Yoshida (penalty scored)		(penalty scored) Yamanaka; (penalty scored) Mateus; (penalty scored) Izumi; (penalty missed) Miya; (penalty scored) Kikuchi; (penalty scored) Hara; (penalty missed) Sato

16 April 2025 Round 2	Tochigi SC (3)	1–2	(1) Avispa Fukuoka	Utsunomiya
19:00	Yagi 71'	Report	Sato 4'; Konno 81'	Stadium: Tochigi Green Stadium; Attendance: 1,614; Referee: Futoshi Nakamura

21 May 2025 Round 3	Kataller Toyama (2)	1–2	(1) Avispa Fukuoka	Toyama
19:00	Takahashi 66'	Report	Maeda 11'; Akino 40'	Stadium: Toyama Stadium; Attendance: 3,594; Referee: Yoshiro Imamura

== Playoff round ==
Sanfrecce Hiroshima joined the other seven group winners in this round, having earned a direct entry via qualification for the 2024–25 AFC Champions League 2. The match pairings were revealed shortly after the completion of the previous round, on 21 May.

=== Summary ===
Team 1	Agg.	Team 2	1st leg	2nd leg
Tokyo Verdy (1)	1–5	(1) Kashiwa Reysol	0–3	2–1
Shonan Bellmare (1)	2–1	(2) Júbilo Iwata	2–0	1–0
Cerezo Osaka (1)	4–5	(1) Yokohama FC	4–1	0–4 (a.e.t.)
Avispa Fukuoka (1)	2–2 (3–4 p.)	(1) Sanfrecce Hiroshima	1–0	2–1 (a.e.t.)

=== Matches ===
4 June 2025	Tokyo Verdy	0–3	Kashiwa Reysol	Chofu
19:03		JLeague.co (EN); JLeague.jp (JA)	Nakagawa 23'; Kubo 62'; Kakita 90+4'	Stadium: Ajinomoto Stadium; Attendance: 8,377; Referee: Keigo Sendachi

8 June 2025	Kashiwa Reysol	2–1	Tokyo Verdy	Kashiwa
19:03	Watai 50'; Kakita 71'	JLeague.co (EN); JLeague.jp (JA)	Someno 43'	Stadium: Sankyo Frontier Kashiwa Stadium; Attendance: 8,037; Referee: Robert Jones (England)

4 June 2025	Shonan Bellmare	2–0	Júbilo Iwata	Hiratsuka
19:03	Nemoto 16'; H. Okuno 31'	JLeague.co (EN); JLeague.jp (JA)		Stadium: Lemon Gas Stadium Hiratsuka; Attendance: 5,252; Referee: Takuto Okabe

8 June 2025	Júbilo Iwata	1–0	Shonan Bellmare	Iwata
14:03	Uehara 78'	JLeague.co (EN); JLeague.jp (JA)		Stadium: Yamaha Stadium; Attendance: 8,908; Referee: Hayato Shimizu

4 June 2025	Cerezo Osaka	4–1	Yokohama FC	Osaka
19:03	Kagawa 55'; Vitor Bueno 68'; Rafael Ratão 90+1'; Nakajima 90+8'	JLeague.co (EN); JLeague.jp (JA)	Ogura 90+6'	Stadium: Yodoko Sakura Stadium; Attendance: 7,110; Referee: Koei Koya

8 June 2025	Yokohama FC	4–0 (a.e.t.)	Cerezo Osaka	Yokohama
18:03	Mori 45+2' (pen.); Yuri Lara 84'; M. Suzuki 89'; Sakuragawa 104'	JLeague.co (EN); JLeague.jp (JA)		Stadium: NHK Spring Mitsuzawa Football Stadium; Attendance: 3,825; Referee: Takafumi Mikuriya

4 June 2025	Avispa Fukuoka	1–0	Sanfrecce Hiroshima	Fukuoka
19:03	Wellington 55'	JLeague.co (EN); JLeague.jp (JA)		Stadium: Best Denki Stadium; Attendance: 3,670; Referee: Masuya Ueda

8 June 2025	Sanfrecce Hiroshima	2–1 (a.e.t.) (4–3 p)	Avispa Fukuoka	Hiroshima
15:03	Nakano 31'; Nakamura 64'	JLeague.co (EN); JLeague.jp (JA)	Wellington 72'	Stadium: Edion Peace Wing Hiroshima
	Penalties
	V. Germain (penalty missed); Higashi (penalty scored); Marcos Júnior (penalty scored); R. Germain (penalty scored); Nakano (penalty scored)		(penalty scored) Kitajima; (penalty scored) Kanamori; (penalty missed) Ando; (penalty scored) Kamijima; (penalty missed) Wellington

== Prime round ==
The match pairings for the prime round were announced on 16 June.

=== Bracket ===
Quarter-finals
Kashiwa Reysol	4	1	5
Yokohama F. Marinos	1	0	1
Kawasaki Frontale	1	3	4
Urawa Red Diamonds	1	2	3
Sanfrecce Hiroshima	2	4	6
Shonan Bellmare	3	1	4
Vissel Kobe	0	1	1
Yokohama FC	2	0	2

Semi-finals
Kashiwa Reysol	1	4	5
Kawasaki Frontale	3	1	4
Sanfrecce Hiroshima	2	2	4
Yokohama FC	0	1	1

Final
Kashiwa Reysol	1
Sanfrecce Hiroshima	3

=== Quarter-finals ===
The four play-off round winners were joined by four new entrants: 2025 FIFA Club World Cup participants Urawa Red Diamonds and 2024–25 AFC Champions League Elite participants Yokohama F. Marinos, Kawasaki Frontale and Vissel Kobe.

==== Summary ====
Team 1	Agg.	Team 2	1st leg	2nd leg
Yokohama F. Marinos (1)	1–5	(1) Kashiwa Reysol	1–4	1–0
Urawa Red Diamonds (1)	3–4	(1) Kawasaki Frontale	1–1	3–2
Shonan Bellmare (1)	4–6	(1) Sanfrecce Hiroshima	3–2	4–1
Yokohama FC (1)	2–1	(1) Vissel Kobe	2–0	1–0

==== Matches ====
3 September 2025	Yokohama F. Marinos	1–4	Kashiwa Reysol	Yokohama
19:03	Uenaka 82'	JLeague.co (EN); JLeague.jp (JA)	Diego 18'; Segawa 53' (pen.); Kakita 70', 90+8'	Stadium: Nissan Stadium; Attendance: 9,656; Referee: Akihiro Ikeuchi

7 September 2025	Kashiwa Reysol	1–0	Yokohama F. Marinos	Kashiwa
19:03	Toshima 90+1'	JLeague.co (EN); JLeague.jp (JA)		Stadium: Sankyo Frontier Kashiwa Stadium; Attendance: 11,682; Referee: Futoshi Nakamura

3 September 2025	Urawa Red Diamonds	1–1	Kawasaki Frontale	Saitama
19:33	Nakajima 22'	JLeague.co (EN); JLeague.jp (JA)	Ito 90+5'	Stadium: Saitama Stadium 2002; Attendance: 19,767; Referee: Takafumi Mikuriya

7 September 2025	Kawasaki Frontale	3–2 (a.e.t.)	Urawa Red Diamonds	Kawasaki
19:03	Erison 18' (pen.); Ito 88'; Miyagi 96' (pen.)	JLeague.co (EN); JLeague.jp (JA)	Thelin 74'; Nakajima 90'	Stadium: Uvance Todoroki Stadium by Fujitsu; Attendance: 23,214; Referee: Yusuke Araki

3 September 2025	Shonan Bellmare	3–2	Sanfrecce Hiroshima	Hiratsuka
19:03	Suzuki 41'; H. Okuno 49'; Nitta 90+2'	JLeague.co (EN); JLeague.jp (JA)	Kato 15'; Kinoshita 86'	Stadium: Lemon Gas Stadium Hiratsuka; Attendance: 6,309; Referee: Jumpei Iida

7 September 2025	Sanfrecce Hiroshima	4–1	Shonan Bellmare	Hiroshima
18:33	Kato 23'; R. Germain 61' (pen.); V. Germain 90+4'; Nakano 90+8'	JLeague.co (EN); JLeague.jp (JA)	Suzuki 37'	Stadium: Edion Peace Wing Hiroshima; Attendance: 23,694; Referee: Koichiro Fukushima

3 September 2025	Yokohama FC	2–0	Vissel Kobe	Yokohama
19:03	João Paulo 50'; Ogura 58'	JLeague.co (EN); JLeague.jp (JA)		Stadium: NHK Spring Mitsuzawa Football Stadium; Attendance: 4,034; Referee: Koei Koya

7 September 2025	Vissel Kobe	1–0	Yokohama FC	Kobe
19:03	Osako 84'	JLeague.co (EN); JLeague.jp (JA)		Stadium: Noevir Stadium Kobe; Attendance: 6,171; Referee: Masuya Ueda

=== Semi-finals ===
==== Summary ====
Team 1	Agg.	Team 2	1st leg	2nd leg
Kawasaki Frontale (1)	4–5	Kashiwa Reysol (1)	3–1	1–4
Yokohama FC (1)	1–4	Sanfrecce Hiroshima (1)	0–2	1–2

==== Matches ====
8 October 2025	Kawasaki Frontale	3–1	Kashiwa Reysol	Kawasaki
19:03	Yamamoto 10'; van Wermeskerken 28'; Ito 85'	JLeague.co (EN)	Koizumi 62'	Stadium: Uvance Todoroki Stadium by Fujitsu; Attendance: 19,505; Referee: Yudai Yamamoto

12 October 2025	Kashiwa Reysol	4–1	Kawasaki Frontale	Kashiwa
16:03	Kakita 26'; Nakama 73'; Hosoya 77', 90+2'	JLeague.co (EN)	Wakizaka 4'	Stadium: Sankyo Frontier Kashiwa Stadium; Attendance: 14,093; Referee: Yoshiro Imamura

8 October 2025	Yokohama FC	0–2	Sanfrecce Hiroshima	Yokohama
19:03		JLeague.co (EN)	Nakajima 33'; Nakano 84'	Stadium: NHK Spring Mitsuzawa Football Stadium; Attendance: 8,641; Referee: Koji Takasaki

12 October 2025	Sanfrecce Hiroshima	2–1	Yokohama FC	Hiroshima
15:03	V. Germain 10'; R. Germain 75'	JLeague.co (EN)	Yamane 17'	Stadium: Edion Peace Wing Hiroshima; Attendance: 26,192; Referee: Hiroyuki Kimura

=== Final ===
1 November 2025
13:09 JST

Kashiwa Reysol	1–3	Sanfrecce Hiroshima
Hosoya 81'	JLeague.co (EN); JLeague.jp (JA)	Araki 25'; Higashi 38'; R. Germain 45+2'

Japan National Stadium, Shinjuku, Tokyo
Attendance: 62,466
Referee: Takafumi Mikuriya

== Top scorers ==
Rank	Player	Club	Goals
1	(Japan) Yuki Kakita	Kashiwa Reysol	5
2	(Brazil) Thiago Andrade	Cerezo Osaka	3
2	(Brazil) Vitor Bueno	Cerezo Osaka	3
2	(Japan) Ryo Germain	Sanfrecce Hiroshima	3
2	(Japan) Tatsuya Ito	Kawasaki Frontale	3
2	(Japan) Hayato Nakama	Kashiwa Reysol	3
2	(Brazil) Rafael Ratão	Cerezo Osaka	3
2	(Brazil) Marcelo Ryan	FC Tokyo	3
2	(Japan) Akito Suzuki	Shonan Bellmare	3
2	(Japan) Shosei Usui	Avispa Fukuoka	3

== See also ==
- 2025 Japanese Super Cup
- 2025 Emperor's Cup
- 2025 J1 League
- 2025 J2 League
- 2025 J3 League
- 2025 Japan Football League
- 2025 Japanese Regional Leagues
