= 1992 Yokohama Flügels season =

Yokohama Flügels
1992 season
- Manager: Shū Kamo
- Stadium: Yokohama Mitsuzawa Football Stadium (under repair)
- Emperor's Cup: 2nd Round
- J.League Cup: GL 10th
Home colours	Away colours

1992 Yokohama Flügels season

== Team name ==
Club name
ANA Satokogyo Football Club
Nickname
A.S Flügels

== Competitions ==
Competitions	Position
Emperor's Cup	2nd round
J.League Cup	GL 10th / 10 clubs

== Domestic results ==
=== Emperor's Cup ===
5 December 1992 1st Round	Osaka University of Commerce	3–4	Yokohama Flügels	Kyoto Yamashiro Stadium
: JST (UTC+09:00)	?' (o.g.) 夘田 ?'; Nakaguchi ?'		Alfred ?'; Gliha ?'; Sorimachi ?'; Umezawa ?'

6 December 1992 2nd Round	Yokohama Marinos	4–2 (a.e.t.)	Yokohama Flügels	Kyoto Yamashiro Stadium
: JST (UTC+09:00)	Everton ?' (pen.) ?' (o.g.); Matsuhashi ?', ?'		Alfred ?'; Chelona ?'

=== J.League Cup ===
5 September 1992 GL-1	Kashima Antlers	4–2	Yokohama Flügels	Kasamatsu Stadium
15:00 JST (UTC+09:00)	Irii 24'; Hasegawa 30', 51'; Milton 87'	J. League	Maeda 32'; Ōtake 79'	Attendance: 5,226; Referee: Kiichirō Tachi; Assistant referees: Yū Nakamura; Masato Nogami; Fourth official: Ryūichi Mogi

9 September 1992 GL-2	Nagoya Grampus Eight	2–1 (sudden-death) (a.e.t.)	Yokohama Flügels	Nagoya Mizuho Football Stadium
19:00 JST (UTC+09:00)	T. Ogura 25'; Gotō 94'	J. League	Gliha 51'	Attendance: 5,165; Referee: Fumikazu Shioyazono; Assistant referees: Keiichi Sunakawa; Naoyuki Mori; Fourth official: Takayoshi Kashino

12 September 1992 GL-3	Yokohama Flügels	3–2	Gamba Osaka	Nagasaki Stadium
15:00 JST (UTC+09:00)	Ikenoue 30'; Maeda 32'; Tomishima 44'	J. League	Nagashima 22', 71'	Attendance: 5,262; Referee: Kōetsu Kikuchi; Assistant referees: Fumikazu Shioyazono; Hideaki Harada; Fourth official: Tsutomu Io

19 September 1992 GL-4	Yokohama Flügels	0–3	Shimizu S-Pulse	Kagoshima Kamoike Stadium
15:37 JST (UTC+09:00)		J. League	Mirandinha 46'; Toninho 84', 89'	Attendance: 4,687; Referee: Kenji Tanaka; Assistant referees: Kazuya Yanagisawa; Akihiro Torigoe; Fourth official: Shōji Hamada

22 September 1992 GL-5	Yokohama Flügels	1–2	Urawa Red Diamonds	Hiratsuka Stadium
19:00 JST (UTC+09:00)	Ikenoue 46'	J. League	Hashiratani 15'; Hori 74'	Attendance: 5,684; Referee: Fumikazu Shioyazono; Assistant referees: Masayoshi Okada; Noboru Ishiyama; Fourth official: Senri Takahashi

26 September 1992 GL-6	Verdy Kawasaki	3–0	Yokohama Flügels	Tokyo National Stadium
15:00 JST (UTC+09:00)	Miura 12', 66'; Kikuhara 19'	J. League		Attendance: 10,317; Referee: Shizuo Takada; Assistant referees: Keiichi Sunakawa; Kimio Izaki; Fourth official: Masashi Kajino

3 October 1992 GL-7	Yokohama Flügels	0–0 (sudden-death) (a.e.t.) (0–1 p)	JEF United Ichihara	Nishigaoka Soccer Stadium
15:00 JST (UTC+09:00)		J. League		Attendance: 4,650; Referee: Masahiro Sogawa; Assistant referees: Kōetsu Kikuchi; Takashi Kunori; Fourth official: Senri Takahashi
	Penalties
	(penalty missed) Ikenoue		(penalty scored) Pavel

7 October 1992 GL-8	Sanfrecce Hiroshima	5–1	Yokohama Flügels	Hiroshima Stadium
18:30 JST (UTC+09:00)	Takagi 3', 88'; Tanaka 15'; Shima 51'; Bielik 86'	J. League	Maeda 39'	Attendance: 3,291; Referee: Kōetsu Kikuchi; Assistant referees: Masanori Watanabe; Ryōichi Nishida; Fourth official: Mamoru Ueda

11 October 1992 GL-9	Yokohama Marinos	1–2 (sudden-death) (a.e.t.)	Yokohama Flügels	Hiratsuka Stadium
14:00 JST (UTC+09:00)	Everton 48'	J. League	Tomishima 10'; Alfred 119'	Attendance: 5,109; Referee: Hideo Kikuchi; Assistant referees: Fumikazu Shioyazono; Hisashi Uemura; Fourth official: Harumi Sasaki

== Player statistics ==
Pos.	Nat.	Player	D.o.B. (Age)	Height / Weight	Emperor's Cup		J.League Cup		Total	
Pos.	Nat.	Player	D.o.B. (Age)	Height / Weight	Apps	Goals	Apps	Goals	Apps	Goals
FW	(El Salvador)	Chelona	January 17, 1960 (aged 32)	185 cm / 80 kg		1	4	0		1
MF	(Japan)	Shinji Kobayashi	October 17, 1963 (aged 28)	168 cm / 61 kg		0	0	0		0
MF	(Japan)	Yasuharu Sorimachi	March 8, 1964 (aged 28)	173 cm / 64 kg		1	5	0		1
FW	(Japan)	Hitoshi Tomishima	June 1, 1964 (aged 28)	180 cm / 75 kg		0	9	2		2
GK	(Japan)	Ryūji Ishizue	July 22, 1964 (aged 28)	184 cm / 75 kg		0	5	0		0
MF	(Japan)	Musashi Mizushima	September 10, 1964 (aged 27)	177 cm / 72 kg		0	1	0		0
DF	(Japan)	Naoto Hori	November 28, 1964 (aged 27)	183 cm / 73 kg		0	5	0		0
FW	(Japan)	Osamu Maeda	September 5, 1965 (aged 27)	176 cm / 74 kg		0	9	3		3
DF	(Japan)	Yoshinori Taguchi	September 14, 1965 (aged 26)	183 cm / 79 kg	1	0	0	0	1	0
MF	(Slovenia)	Alfred	January 21, 1967 (aged 25)	182 cm / 77 kg	2	2	8	1	10	3
DF	(Japan)	Atsuhiro Iwai	January 31, 1967 (aged 25)	177 cm / 66 kg		0	9	0		0
MF	(Japan)	Shunichi Ikenoue	February 16, 1967 (aged 25)	170 cm / 70 kg		0	9	2		2
FW	(Slovenia)	Gliha	October 8, 1967 (aged 24)	177 cm / 75 kg		1	2	1		2
FW	(Japan)	Takashi Kawamura	June 20, 1968 (aged 24)	186 cm / 80 kg		0	0	0		0
DF	(Japan)	Tadaaki Kawahara	June 23, 1968 (aged 24)	183 cm / 78 kg		0	0	0		0
DF	(Japan)	Naoto Ōtake	October 18, 1968 (aged 23)	178 cm / 72 kg		0	8	1		1
MF	(Japan)	Motohiro Yamaguchi	January 29, 1969 (aged 23)	177 cm / 72 kg		0	6	0		0
MF	(Japan)	Shūta Sonoda	February 6, 1969 (aged 23)	170 cm / 65 kg		0	0	0		0
FW	(Japan)	Ryō Adachi	July 2, 1969 (aged 23)	170 cm / 65 kg		0	0	0		0
GK	(Japan)	Masahiko Nakagawa	August 26, 1969 (aged 23)	180 cm / 72 kg		0	4	0		0
DF	(Japan)	Ippei Watanabe	September 28, 1969 (aged 22)	184 cm / 80 kg		0	0	0		0
MF	(Japan)	Hideki Katsura	March 6, 1970 (aged 22)	160 cm / 58 kg		0	0	0		0
MF	(Japan)	Jun Naitō	December 18, 1970 (aged 21)	170 cm / 64 kg		0	8	0		0
GK	(Japan)	Hiroshi Satō	March 7, 1972 (aged 20)	181 cm / 74 kg		0	0	0		0
DF	(Japan)	Norihiro Satsukawa	April 18, 1972 (aged 20)	175 cm / 75 kg		0	1	0		0
MF	(Japan)	Yoshiyuki Sakamoto	May 30, 1972 (aged 20)	170 cm / 65 kg		0	0	0		0
GK	(Japan)	Atsuhiko Mori	May 31, 1972 (aged 20)	179 cm / 73 kg		0	0	0		0
FW	(Japan)	Hideki Yoshioka	June 6, 1972 (aged 20)	178 cm / 72 kg		0	0	0		0
MF	(Japan)	Manabu Umezawa	August 29, 1972 (aged 20)	170 cm / 63 kg		1	7	0		1
DF	(Japan)	Ichizō Nakata	April 19, 1973 (aged 19)	174 cm / 69 kg		0	0	0		0
DF	(Japan)	Keita Yoshizumi	April 24, 1973 (aged 19)	178 cm / 70 kg		0	0	0		0
MF	(Japan)	Akihiko Ichikawa	May 22, 1973 (aged 19)	174 cm / 66 kg		0	0	0		0
DF	(Japan)	Masaaki Takada	July 26, 1973 (aged 19)	182 cm / 76 kg		0	9	0		0
MF	(Japan)	Masakiyo Maezono	October 29, 1973 (aged 18)	170 cm / 63 kg		0	0	0		0
FW	(Japan)	Tomohiro Irie	November 14, 1973 (aged 18)	180 cm / 76 kg		0	0	0		0
FW	(Japan)	Takashi Uemura	December 2, 1973 (aged 18)	190 cm / 85 kg		0	6	0		0

== Transfers ==
In:

No.	Pos.	Nation	Player
—	GK	JPN	Masahiko Nakagawa (from Kokushikan University)
—	DF	JPN	Masaaki Takada (from Hosei University)
—	MF	SVN	Alfred Jermaniš (from FC Olimpija)
—	MF	JPN	Shinji Kobayashi (from Kofu soccer club)
—	MF	JPN	Ichizō Nakata (from Yokkaichi Chuo Technical High School)
—	MF	JPN	Masakiyo Maezono (from Kagoshima Jitsugyo High School)
—	FW	SLV	Chelona (from NKK)
—	FW	SVN	Primož Gliha (from Dinamo Zagreb)
—	FW	JPN	Takashi Kawamura (from Mazda)
—	GK	JPN	Hiroshi Satō (from Nissan farm)
—	DF	JPN	Keita Yoshizumi (from Yomiuri Junior)
—	DF	JPN	Ippei Watanabe (from Osaka University of Commerce)
—	MF	JPN	Akihiko Ichikawa (from Shutoku Senior High School)
—	MF	JPN	Hideki Katsura (from Osaka University of Health and Sport Sciences)
—	FW	JPN	Tomohiro Irie (from Utsunomiya Kita High School)
—	FW	JPN	Takashi Uemura (from Kunimi High School)
—	FW	JPN	Ryō Adachi (from Senshu University)

Out:

No.	Pos.	Nation	Player
1	GK	JPN	Kōji Ōsawa
5	MF	JPN	Toshitaka Mishima
6	DF	JPN	Masanao Sasaki (to JEF United Ichihara)
8	MF	JPN	Hideki Hamada
9	FW	ARG	Silvio Gabriel Rudman
10	MF	ARG	Oscar Román Acosta
13	DF	JPN	Tatsuya Makiuchi
14	FW	JPN	Keiichi Ōnuki
18	FW	JPN	Shigeto Sasaki
19	DF	JPN	Naoto Ikeda
21	GK	JPN	Masanori Sanada (to Shimizu S-Pulse)
22	DF	JPN	Junya Morishige
24	FW	JPN	Hideya Ōishi
27	MF	JPN	Norihiko Shizuhata
28	FW	JPN	Kenji Tomita

== Transfers during the season ==
=== In ===
none

=== Out ===
none

== Other pages ==
- (in Japanese) J. League official site
- (in Japanese) Yokohama F. Marinos official web site
