= Urakami (disambiguation) =

Urakami is an area in the northern part of the city of Nagasaki, Japan. Urakami may also refer to:

== People ==
- Niki Urakami (born 1997), Japanese footballer
- Ryoko Urakami (born 1947), Japanese freestyle swimmer
- Takeshi Urakami (born 1969), Japanese footballer

== Other uses ==
- Urakami Station, railway station in Japan
- Urakami Yoban Kuzure, the last and biggest of four crackdowns on Christians in Urakami Village, Nagasaki, Japan
