= Taiyo Nishino =

Japanese footballer (born 2002)

Personal information
- Date of birth: 10 August 2002 (age 24)
- Place of birth: Tokushima, Tokushima, Japan
- Height: 1.80 m (5 ft 11 in)
- Position: Forward

Team information
- Current team: Shonan Bellmare
- Number: 19

Youth career
- Tamiya Victory SSS
- Tokushima Vortis
- 2018–2020: Kyoto Tachibana High School

Senior career*
Years	Team	Apps	(Gls)
2020–2025	Tokushima Vortis	68	(4)
2026	Tochigi SC	11	(6)
2026–	Shonan Bellmare	1	(0)
- * Club domestic league appearances and goals as of 14 August 2026

Taiyo Nishino (西野 太陽, Nishino Taiyo; born 10 August 2002) is a Japanese footballer currently playing as a forward for Shonan Bellmare.

== Career statistics ==
=== Club ===
As of 7 July 2021.

Club	Season	League			National Cup		League Cup		Other		Total	
Club	Season	Division	Apps	Goals	Apps	Goals	Apps	Goals	Apps	Goals	Apps	Goals
Tokushima Vortis	2020	J2 League	0	0	0	0	0	0	0	0	0	0
Tokushima Vortis	2021	J1 League	1	0	1 (Note: Appearances in the Emperor's Cup)	0	0	0	0	0	2	0
Career total			1	0	1	0	0	0	0	0	2	0
