= Fujieda MYFC =

Japanese football club

Fujieda MYFC 藤枝MYFC
- Full name: Fujieda MYFC
- Nicknames: MYFC, Wisteria
- Founded: 2009; 17 years ago
- Ground: Fujieda Soccer Stadium (Fujieda, Shizuoka)
- Capacity: 13,000
- Chairman: Jun Koyama
- Manager: Tomoaki Makino
- League: J2 League
- 2025: J2 League, 15th of 20
- Website: myfc.co.jp
Home colours	Away colours

Fujieda MYFC (藤枝MYFC, Fujieda Maiefushī) are a Japanese professional football club based in Fujieda, Shizuoka. They currently play in J2 League, the Japanese second tier of professional football. It was previously funded by online subscribers and was the first of its kind in Japan.

The club spent two seasons in the Japan Football League before having their application accepted in 2013 to participate in the inaugural season of J3 League in 2014.

== History ==
The current club was formed in 2010 as a merger of two clubs, Fujieda Nelson (named after Daishiro Yoshimura's Brazilian middle name) and Shizuoka FC. The My Football Club project bought Fujieda Nelson CF in 2008 and renamed them Fujieda MYFC. Then in 2010, My Football Club bought Shizuoka FC and merged the two clubs to form Shizuoka Fujieda MYFC. Toshihide Saito was appointed player/manager of the club.

In their first season the club finished 1st in the Tokai League Division 1 but was knocked out of the Regional League promotion series.

On 2011, they took second place in the Regional League promotion series and therefore won promotion to the Japan Football League for the first time, becoming the third representative of the prefecture in the national leagues. They then dropped the Shizuoka from their name and become just Fujieda MYFC.

In 2012, the club finished their first season in the Japan Football League in 11th place and therefore secured their place in the division for the following 2013 season.

After finishing 13th in the Japan Football League in 2013, the club were accepted in the inaugural J. League Division 3 which competed in 2014. Following the club's acceptance, player/manager Toshihide Saito decided to leave the club.

On 7 January 2014, Musashi Mizushima was appointed as manager, following Saito's resignation.

In April 2019, Fujieda announced that Kaihōku by Asian Kung-Fu Generation would become the club's official support song.

After nine seasons in the J3 League, Fujieda MYFC secured promotion to the J2 League for the 2023 season. They were promoted to Japan's 2nd division for the first time in club's history, following a 0–0 draw against AC Nagano Parceiro in the last matchweek of the 2022 season. The club finished as runners-up with total 67 points earned in 34 matches.

On 26 September 2023, Fujieda MYFC was declared to have met the requirements to obtain a license up to J1 League level.

== Stadium ==
Fujieda play their home games at the Fujieda Sports Complex Park which has a capacity of 5,056 and was opened in 2002.

== League & cup record ==
Champions	Runners-up	Third place	Promoted	Relegated

League														J. League Cup	Emperor's Cup
Season	Division	Tier	Teams	Pos.	P	W	D	L	F	A	GD	Pts	Attendance/G	J. League Cup	Emperor's Cup
2010	Tokai Div. 1	4	9	1st	16	12	3	1	49	8	41	39		Not eligible	Did not qualify
2011	Tokai Div. 1	4	8	1st	14	12	2	0	42	9	33	38		Not eligible	Did not qualify
2012	JFL	3	17	11th	32	11	7	14	39	48	-11	40	532	Not eligible	Did not qualify
2013	JFL	3	18	13th	34	9	9	16	40	58	-12	36	953	Not eligible	2nd round
2014	J3	3	12	11th	33	7	9	17	36	52	-16	30	1,319	Not eligible	2nd round
2015	J3	3	13	10th	36	11	4	21	37	61	-24	7	1,103	Not eligible	3rd round
2016	J3	3	16	7th	30	14	3	13	48	42	6	45	1,531	Not eligible	Did not qualify
2017	J3	3	17	7th	32	12	11	9	50	43	7	47	1,448	Not eligible	Did not qualify
2018	J3	3	17	16th	32	10	4	18	32	48	-16	34	1,273	Not eligible	Did not qualify
2019	J3	3	18	3rd	34	18	9	7	42	31	11	63	1,740	Not eligible	Did not qualify
2020 †	J3	3	18	10th	34	14	7	13	48	44	4	49	686	Not eligible	Did not qualify
2021	J3	3	15	10th	28	8	8	12	42	42	0	32	1,322	Not eligible	Did not qualify
2022	J3	3	18	2nd	34	20	7	7	58	29	29	67	1,746	Not eligible	1st round
2023	J2	2	22	12th	42	14	10	18	61	72	-11	52	3,145	Not eligible	2nd round
2024	J2	2	20	13th	38	14	4	20	38	57	-19	46	4,274	1st round	3rd round
2025	J2	2	20	15th	38	9	12	17	41	50	-9	39	5,029	1st round	3rd round
2026	J2	2	40	19th	18	6	9	3	21	17	4	30	5,750	N/A	N/A
2026-27	J2	2	20	TBD	38									TBD	TBD

Key

- Pos. = Position in league; P = Games played; W = Games won; D = Games drawn; L = Games lost; F = Goals scored; A = Goals conceded; GD = Goals difference; Pts = Points gained
- Attendance/G = Average home league attendance
- † 2020 season attendance reduced by COVID-19 worldwide pandemic
- Source: J.League Data Site

== Honours ==
Fujieda MYFC honours
Honour	No.	Years
Tokai League Division 1	2	2010, 2011
Shizuoka Prefectural Football Championship Emperor's Cup Shizuoka Prefectural Qualifiers	4	2013, 2014, 2015, 2022

== Current squad ==
As of 9 September 2026.

Note: Flags indicate national team as defined under FIFA eligibility rules; some limited exceptions apply. Players may hold more than one non-FIFA nationality.

No.	Pos.	Nation	Player
1	GK	JPN	Junto Taguchi
2	DF	JPN	Keita Matsuda
3	DF	JPN	Shota Suzuki
4	DF	JPN	So Nakagawa
5	DF	JPN	Takumi Kusumoto
6	DF	JPN	Takuya Okamoto
7	FW	JPN	Shunnosuke Matsuki
8	MF	JPN	Yoshikaze Tsunoda (on loan from Kashiwa Reysol)
10	FW	JPN	Yusuke Kikui
11	FW	JPN	Hayato Manabe
13	MF	JPN	Yuto Nakamura
14	MF	JPN	Jinta Miki
15	MF	JPN	Masahiko Sugita
16	DF	JPN	Yuri Mori
17	FW	JPN	Riyo Kawamoto
18	FW	JPN	Takaya Numata
19	DF	JPN	Yusei Kondo

No.	Pos.	Nation	Player
20	FW	JPN	Wigi Kanemoto (on loan from Cerezo Osaka)
21	GK	JPN	Rei Jones
22	DF	JPN	Ryosuke Hisadomi
23	MF	JPN	Ryota Kajikawa
24	GK	JPN	Shun Yoshida
26	MF	JPN	Taiga Kawamoto
28	DF	JPN	Keito Omori
30	MF	JPN	Kaito Seriu
31	GK	JPN	Daishi Kurisu
37	FW	JPN	Kota Watanabe ^{DSP}
38	MF	JPN	Rei Shimano (on loan from Kashiwa Reysol)
41	MF	JPN	Uheiji Uehata
48	MF	JPN	Yuha Yukumoto
66	MF	JPN	Yuto Nagao
77	MF	JPN	Maki Kitahara ^{Type 2} (on loan from FC Tokyo)
97	MF	JPN	Shunsuke Aoki (on loan from V-Varen Nagasaki)

=== Out on loan ===
Note: Flags indicate national team as defined under FIFA eligibility rules; some limited exceptions apply. Players may hold more than one non-FIFA nationality.

No.	Pos.	Nation	Player
—	FW	JPN	Hayato Kanda (at FC Gifu)
—	MF	JPN	Chie Edoojon Kawakami (at Tokushima Vortis)
—	MF	JPN	Ryo Nakamura (at Thespa Gunma)

No.	Pos.	Nation	Player
—	MF	JPN	Hiroto Sese (at Tochigi SC)
—	FW	JPN	Kenshin Yamazaki (at (Singapore) Tampines Rovers)

== Coaching staff ==
Position	Name
Director of football	Atsuto Oishi
Manager	Tomoaki Makino
Assistant manager	Kenji Nakada
First-team coach	Yoji Yabu; Takuma Edamura
Goalkeeping coach	Kensaku Abe
Physical coach	Shojiro Ida
Technical coach	Yoshiki Seike
Coach and Interpreter	Júlio
Chief trainer	Yoshinari Akiyama
Trainer	Kengo Emoto; Kazumasa Suzuki
Competent	Shinya Aoyama
Side affairs	Ibuki Wada

== Managerial history ==
Manager	Nationality	Tenure	
Manager	Nationality	Start	Finish
Kunishige Kamamoto	Japan	1 February 2009	31 January 2010
Toshihide Saitō	Japan	1 January 2010	31 December 2013
Musashi Mizushima	Japan	7 January 2014	31 December 2014
Atsuto Ōishi	Japan	1 February 2015	22 July 2018
Nobuhiro Ishizaki	Japan	27 July 2018	31 January 2021
Yasuharu Kurata	Japan	1 February 2021	12 July 2021
Daisuke Sudō	Japan	12 July 2021	Current

== Records ==
=== Emperor's Cup record ===
Fujieda have qualified for the Emperor's Cup in five occasions, making its debut in the competition on 2013.

Year	Round	Opposition	Score
2013	1	Arterivo Wakayama	3–2 (aet)
2013	2	Shimizu S-Pulse	0–2
2014	1	Arterivo Wakayama	4–2 (aet)
2014	2	Júbilo Iwata	0–2
2015	1	Nara Club	0–0 (6–5 PK)
2015	2	Shimizu S-Pulse	4–2
2015	3	Montedio Yamagata	1–2
2022	1	Kataller Toyama	0–1
2023	2	Vegalta Sendai	0–1

== Kit evolution ==
Home Kit - 1st
2014	2015	2016	2017	2018
2019	2020	2021	2022	2023
2024	2025	2026 -		

Away Kit - 2nd
2014	2015	2016	2017	2018
2019	2020	2021	2022	2023
2024	2025	2026 -		
