= Yasuharu Kurata =

Japanese footballer

Yasuharu Kurata 倉田 安治
Personal information
- Full name: Yasuharu Kurata
- Date of birth: February 1, 1963 (age 63)
- Place of birth: Fujieda, Shizuoka, Japan
- Height: 1.78 m (5 ft 10 in)
- Positions: Midfielder; defender

Youth career
- Fujieda Higashi High School

College career
Years	Team	Apps	(Gls)
- University of Tsukuba

Senior career*
Years	Team	Apps	(Gls)
1986–1991	Honda	77	(5)
1991–1992	Yomiuri	2	(0)
Total		79	(5)

International career
1986–1987	Japan	6	(0)
1989	Japan Futsal		

Managerial career
- 2010: FC Gifu
- 2014: Dalian Aerbin
- 2015: Tochigi SC
- 2021: Fujieda MYFC
Medal record
Yomiuri
Winner	Japan Soccer League	1991/92
Winner	JSL Cup	1991
Runner-up	Emperor's Cup	1991
- * Club domestic league appearances and goals

Yasuharu Kurata (倉田 安治, Kurata Yasuharu; born February 1, 1963) is a Japanese former footballer. He played for the Japan national team.

== Club career ==
Kurata was born in Fujieda, Shizuoka Prefecture on February 1, 1963. After graduating from University of Tsukuba, he joined Japan Soccer League club Honda in 1986. In 1991, he moved to Yomiuri and played one season. The club won the 1991 JSL Cup and the 1991–92 Japan Soccer League. He retired in 1992.

== International career ==
=== Football ===
In September 1986, he was selected by the Japan national team for 1986 Asian Games. At this competition, on September 20, he debuted against Nepal. In 1987, he played at 1988 Summer Olympics qualification. He played in six games for Japan until 1987.

=== Futsal ===
In 1989, Kurata was selected by the Japan national futsal team for 1989 Futsal World Championship in the Netherlands.

== Coaching career ==
After retirement, Kurata started a coaching career at Avispa Fukuoka in 1995. He mainly served as a coach until 2006. In 2007, he moved to Vissel Kobe. In 2010, he moved to FC Gifu and became a manager. In 2012, he moved to China and signed with Dalian Aerbin. In 2014, he became a manager at the club. He returned to Japan in 2015 and he became a manager for Tochigi SC in July.

== National team statistics ==
Japan national team
Year	Apps	Goals
1986	1	0
1987	5	0
Total	6	0

== Managerial statistics ==
Team	From	To	Record				
Team	From	To	G	W	D	L	Win %
FC Gifu	January 2010	December 2010	36	13	6	17	36.11
Dalian Aerbin	June 2014	December 2014	30	6	11	13	20.00
Tochigi SC	2015	2015	18	2	6	10	11.11
Total			84	21	23	40	25.00
