= Ryuji Ishizue =

Japanese footballer

Ryuji Ishizue 石末 龍治
Personal information
- Full name: Ryuji Ishizue
- Date of birth: July 22, 1964 (age 62)
- Place of birth: Itami, Hyogo, Japan
- Height: 1.85 m (6 ft 1 in)
- Position: Goalkeeper

Youth career
- 1980–1982: Itami Kita High School
- 1983–1986: Tokai University

Senior career*
Years	Team	Apps	(Gls)
1987–1994	Yokohama Flügels		
1995–1998	Vissel Kobe	94	(0)
Medal record
Yokohama Flügels
Runner-up	Japan Soccer League	1988/89
Winner	Emperor's Cup	1993
- * Club domestic league appearances and goals

Ryuji Ishizue (石末 龍治, Ishizue Ryuji; born July 22, 1964) is a former Japanese football player and the currently goalkeeper coach J1 League club of Albirex Niigata.

== Playing career ==
Ishizue was born in Itami on July 22, 1964. After graduating from Tokai University, he joined All Nippon Airways (later Yokohama Flügels) in 1987. His played more and more, and he became a regular goalkeeper during the 1989–90 season. However, during the 1990–91 season, he played less often than newcomer Masanori Sanada. In 1992, although Sanada left the club, he still not play as much as Atsuhiko Mori. In 1993, the club won the championship in the Emperor's Cup, their first major title. He played in the Final, and that was his only match that season. In 1995, he moved to his local club, Vissel Kobe, in the Japan Football League. He played as a regular goalkeeper and the club was promoted to the J1 League in 1997. In 1998, his did not play as much as Nobuhiro Maeda and he retired at the end of the 1998 season.

== Club statistics ==
Club performance			League		Cup		League Cup		Total	
Season	Club	League	Apps	Goals	Apps	Goals	Apps	Goals	Apps	Goals
Japan			League		Emperor's Cup		J.League Cup		Total	
1987/88	All Nippon Airways	JSL Division 2								
1988/89	All Nippon Airways	JSL Division 1	10	0					10	0
1989/90	All Nippon Airways	JSL Division 1	20	0			0	0	20	0
1990/91	All Nippon Airways	JSL Division 1	0	0			0	0	0	0
1991/92	All Nippon Airways	JSL Division 1	6	0			0	0	6	0
1992	Yokohama Flügels	J1 League	-				5	0	5	0
1993	Yokohama Flügels	J1 League	0	0	1	0	0	0	1	0
1994	Yokohama Flügels	J1 League	7	0	0	0	2	0	9	0
1995	Vissel Kobe	Football League	23	0	3	0	-		26	0
1996	Vissel Kobe	Football League	30	0	3	0	0	0	33	0
1997	Vissel Kobe	J1 League	28	0	2	0	5	0	35	0
1998	Vissel Kobe	J1 League	13	0	2	0	4	0	19	0
Total			137	0	11	0	16	0	164	0
