= Shuto Kawai =

Japanese footballer

Shuto Kawai 河合 秀人
Personal information
- Full name: Shuto Kawai
- Date of birth: 1 October 1993 (age 33)
- Place of birth: Osaka, Japan
- Height: 1.70 m (5 ft 7 in)
- Position: Midfielder

Team information
- Current team: FC Basara Hyogo
- Number: 7

Youth career
- 2009–2011: Kyoto Tachibana High School

College career
Years	Team	Apps	(Gls)
2012–2015	Osaka Gakuin University		

Senior career*
Years	Team	Apps	(Gls)
2016–2017	Gainare Tottori	58	(11)
2018	AC Nagano Parceiro	26	(3)
2019–2020	FC Ryukyu	63	(7)
2021	Matsumoto Yamaga	38	(3)
2022–2024	Montedio Yamagata	52	(0)
2024	FC Tiamo Hirakata	26	(3)
2025	Iwate Grulla Morioka	14	(1)
2026–	FC Basara Hyogo	0	(0)
- * Club domestic league appearances and goals as of 6 September 2026 @ 05:21(AEST)

Shuto Kawai (河合 秀人, Kawai, Shuto; born 1 October 1993 in Osaka) is a Japanese footballer who plays for FC Basara Hyogo.

== Club statistics ==
Updated to 28 July 2022.

Club performance			League		Cup		Total	
Season	Club	League	Apps	Goals	Apps	Goals	Apps	Goals
Japan			League		Emperor's Cup		Total	
2016	Gainare Tottori	J3 League	29	6	2	0	31	6
2017	Gainare Tottori	J3 League	29	5	0	0	29	5
2018	Nagano Parceiro	J3 League	26	3	2	0	28	3
2019	FC Ryukyu	J2 League	28	3	1	0	29	3
2020	FC Ryukyu	J2 League	35	4	–		35	4
2021	Matsumoto Yamaga	J2 League	38	3	2	0	40	3
2022	Montedio Yamagata	J2 League	21	0	0	0	21	0
Career total			206	24	7	0	213	24
