= Tochigi SC =

Japanese football club

Tochigi SC 栃木SC
- Full name: Tochigi Soccer Club
- Founded: 1953; 73 years ago
- Stadium: Kanseki Stadium Tochigi
- Capacity: 25,244
- President: Daisuke Hashimoto
- Manager: Yoshimi Hamasaki
- League: J3 League
- 2025: J3 League, 7th of 20
- Website: tochigisc.jp
Home colours	Away colours

Tochigi Soccer Club (栃木サッカークラブ, Tochigi Sakkākurabu), commonly referred to as Tochigi SC (栃木SC, Tochigi Esushi) is a Japanese professional football club based in Utsunomiya, Tochigi Prefecture, Japan. They currently play in the J3 League, Japan's third tier of professional football, after being relegated from the J2 League in 2024.

== History ==
Teachers in Tochigi Prefecture founded the club in 1953. They were initially called Tochigi Teachers' Soccer Club (栃木教員サッカー部 Tochigi Kyōin Sakkā Bu). They started to welcome players with other professions in 1994 and renamed themselves as Tochigi Soccer Club. In 1999, Tochigi won the Kanto Regional League and were promoted to the Japan Football League after finishing runners-up in the Regional League play-off. In March 2005, they announced that they would set up a task force to give a serious consideration to turn professional and try to gain J.League status. In January 2007, they achieved J.League Associate Membership status and in the 2008 season they secured qualification for promotion to professional status on 16 November 2008. On 1 December 2008, promotion was made official by the J.League and Tochigi had competed in J.League Division 2 from 2009.

In 2015, Tochigi finished bottom and were relegated to the J3 League for the first time in their history, the third and lowest professional level in the league system. After two seasons, they returned to J2 League from 2018 season who finished as runner-up in 2017. On 27 October 2024, Tochigi officially relegated to the J3 League for the second time after defeat from Shimizu S-Pulse 0-1 at home, ending seven-year stint in the second tier.

== League and cup record ==
Champions	Runners-up	Third place	Promoted	Relegated

League														J.League Cup	Emperor's Cup
Season	Div.	Tier	Teams	Pos.	P	W	D	L	F	A	GD	Pts	Attendance/G	J.League Cup	Emperor's Cup
2007	JFL	3	18	8th	34	14	10	10	43	29	14	52	4,457	—	3rd round
2008	JFL	3	18	2nd	34	18	9	7	65	37	28	63	5,048	—	4th round
2009	J2	2	18	17th	51	8	13	30	38	77	-39	37	4,706	—	2nd round
2010	J2	2	19	10th	36	14	8	14	46	42	4	50	4,157	—	3rd round
2011	J2	2	20	10th	38	15	11	12	44	39	5	56	4,939	—	3rd round
2012	J2	2	22	11th	42	17	9	16	50	49	4	60	3,850	—	2nd round
2013	J2	2	22	9th	42	17	12	13	61	55	6	63	4,922	—	3rd round
2014	J2	2	22	12th	42	15	10	17	52	58	-6	55	5,294	—	2nd round
2015	J2	2	22	22nd	42	7	14	21	39	64	-25	35	5,167	—	1st round
2016	J3	3	16	2nd	30	17	8	5	38	20	18	59	4,917	—	Did not qualify
2017	J3	3	17	2nd	32	16	12	4	44	24	20	60	5,147	—	Did not qualify
2018	J2	2	22	17th	42	13	11	18	38	48	-10	50	5,657	—	2nd round
2019	J2	2	22	20th	42	8	16	18	33	53	-20	40	5,148	—	3rd round
2020 †	J2	2	22	10th	42	15	13	14	41	39	2	58	2,522	—	Did not qualify
2021 †	J2	2	22	14th	42	10	15	17	37	51	-14	45	3,861	—	3rd round
2022	J2	2	22	17th	42	11	16	15	32	40	-8	49	4,429	—	Round of 16
2023	J2	2	22	19th	42	10	14	18	39	47	-8	44	5,834	—	Round of 16
2024	J2	2	20	18th	38	7	13	18	33	57	-24	34	6,238	1st round	2nd round
2025	J3	3	20	7th	38	17	7	14	42	36	6	58	5,393	2nd round	2nd round
2026	J3	3	40	39th	18	4	5	9	23	28	-5	18	6,005	N/A	N/A
2026-27	J3	3	20	TBD	38									1st round	2nd round

Key

- Pos. = Position in league; P = Games played; W = Games won; D = Games drawn; L = Games lost; F = Goals scored; A = Goals conceded; GD = Goals difference; Pts = Points gained
- Attendance/G = Average league home attendance
- † 2020 & 2021 seasons attendance reduced by COVID-19 worldwide pandemic
- Source: J.League Data Site

== Honours ==
Tochigi SC honours
Honour	No.	Years
Tochigi Prefecture Division 1	10	1978, 1979, 1981, 1984, 1987, 1988, 1993, 1994, 1996, 1998
Tochigi Prefectural Football Championship Emperor's Cup Tochigi Prefectural Qualifiers	10	1998, 1999, 2000, 2001, 2002, 2003, 2004, 2006, 2007, 2025
Kanto Soccer League	1	1999

== Players ==
=== Current squad ===
As of 10 September 2026.

Note: Flags indicate national team as defined under FIFA eligibility rules; some limited exceptions apply. Players may hold more than one non-FIFA nationality.

No.	Pos.	Nation	Player
1	GK	JPN	Shuhei Kawata
2	DF	JPN	Ryo Sakurai
3	DF	JPN	Renta Higashi (on loan from FC Tokyo)
4	MF	JPN	Sho Sato
5	DF	JPN	Yasutaka Yanagi
6	DF	JPN	Kaito Abe
7	MF	JPN	Rui Ōsako
9	FW	JPN	Yoshihito Kondo (on loan from Iwaki FC)
10	MF	JPN	Taiyo Igarashi
11	MF	JPN	Taichi Aoshima
13	MF	JPN	Kota Osone
14	DF	JPN	Shunya Suzuki (on loan from RB Omiya Ardija)
15	MF	JPN	Haruki Tsutsumi
16	MF	JPN	Toya Myogan (on loan from Kawasaki Frontale)
17	MF	JPN	Koki Sugimori
18	MF	JPN	Yoshiki Matsushita
20	FW	JPN	Wadi Ibrahim Suzuki
21	GK	JPN	Riki Sakuraba
23	MF	JPN	Hiroto Sese (on loan from Fujieda MYFC)

No.	Pos.	Nation	Player
24	DF	JPN	Ryusei Tabata
25	FW	JPN	Taiyo Yamaguchi (on loan from FC Tokyo)
26	DF	JPN	Tomoki Tabata
27	MF	JPN	Taishi Nagai
29	FW	JPN	Kisho Yano
31	GK	JPN	Shuhei Shikano
33	GK	JPN	Shoya Sasazaki ^{DSP}
37	DF	JPN	Yuto Kimura
39	MF	JPN	Kazuma Yagi
41	GK	JPN	Ryuga Tashiro (on loan from Albirex Niigata)
47	MF	JPN	Haruto Yoshino
52	MF	JPN	Haruaki Ichikawa ^{Type 2}
53	MF	JPN	Yugo Yuasa ^{Type 2}
54	MF	JPN	Tasuku Yokohama ^{Type 2}
77	MF	JPN	Jiro Nakamura
80	FW	NGR	Kenneth Otabor
81	MF	JPN	Katsuya Nakano
88	DF	JPN	Kohei Uchida

=== Out on loan ===
Note: Flags indicate national team as defined under FIFA eligibility rules; some limited exceptions apply. Players may hold more than one non-FIFA nationality.

No.	Pos.	Nation	Player
19	FW	JPN	Hogara Shoji (at AC Nagano Parceiro)
—	FW	JPN	Sora Kobori (at Okinawa SV)

No.	Pos.	Nation	Player
—	MF	JPN	Rui Ageishi (at Maruyasu Okazaki)

== Coaching staff ==
As of 20 October 2026

Position	Name
Manager	(Japan) Yoshimi Hamasaki
Coach	(Japan) Gen Nakamura
Coach	(Japan) Ryota Takasugi
Coach	(Japan) Naotsugu Obata
Coach	(Japan) Yasui Satoshi
Goalkeeper coach	(Japan) Kensaku Abe
Physical coach	(Japan) Hirofumi Sakamoto
Physical coach	(Japan) Taisei Sadamichi
Chief trainer	(Japan) Yuta Matsumoto
Trainer	(Japan) Takahiro Watanabe (Japan) Koyo Yokota
Interpreter	(Japan) Irara Gabriel Kitamura

== Managerial history ==
Manager	Nationality	Tenure	
Manager	Nationality	Start	Finish
Kōichi Hashiratani	Japan	January 1, 2007	December 31, 2008
Hiroshi Matsuda	Japan	February 1, 2009	September 13, 2013
Ikuo Matsumoto	Japan	September 13, 2013	November 25, 2013
Yūji Sakakura	Japan	February 1, 2014	July 20, 2015
Yasuharu Kurata	Japan	July 22, 2015	December 31, 2015
Yūji Yokoyama	Japan	January 1, 2016	December 31, 2018
Kazuaki Tasaka	Japan	February 1, 2019	January 31, 2022
Yū Tokisaki	Japan	February 1, 2022	January 31, 2024
Makoto Tanaka	Japan	February 1, 2024	May 14, 2024
Shinji Kobayashi	Japan	May 15, 2024	December 1, 2025
Atsushi Yoneyama	Japan	December 11, 2025	October 11, 2026
Yoshimi Hamasaki	Japan	October 12, 2026	Present

== Kit evolution ==
The team's colour is yellow.

Home kits – 1st
2008	2009	2010	2011	2012
2013	2014	2015	2016	2017
2018	2019	2020	2021	2022
2023	2024	2025 -		

Away kits – 2nd
2008	2009	2010	2011	2012
2013	2014	2015	2016	2017
2018	2019	2020	2021	2022
2023	2024	2025 -		
