= Kyoto Tachibana Junior and Senior High School =

Coordinates: 34.9321°N 135.7787°E

- 京都橘中学校・高等学校
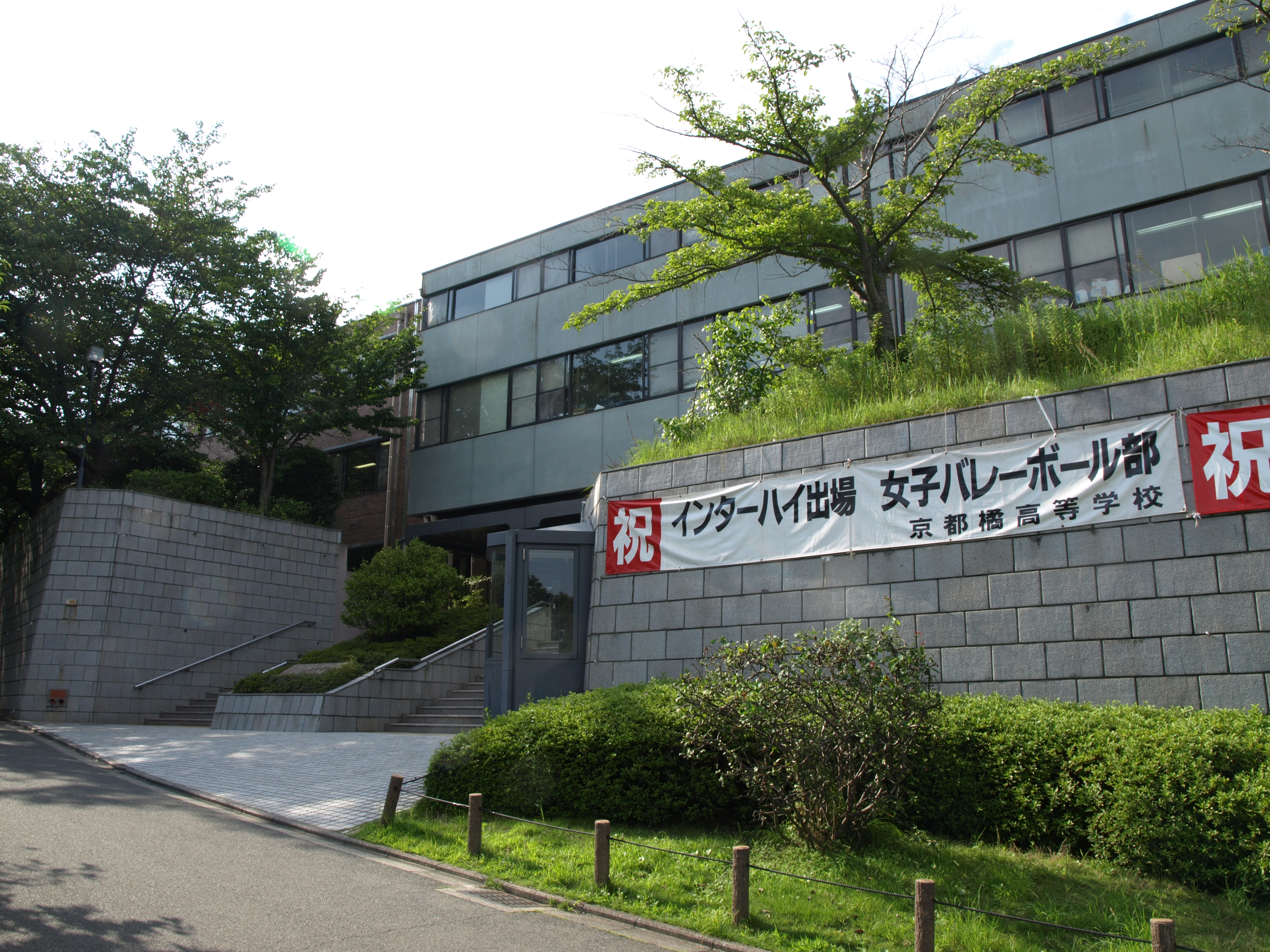

Location
- 50; Iga, Momoyama-cho, Fushimi-ku; Kyoto, Kyoto Prefecture, 612-8026; Japan

Information
- Former names: Kyoto Handicraft Girls' School; Kyoto Handicraft Girls' High School; Kyoto Tachibana Girls' High School; Kyoto Tachibana High School
- Type: Private
- Motto: 変化を楽しむ人であれ (Be a person who enjoys change.)
- Established: 1902
- School code: Junior High School; C126310000257; Senior High School; D126310000059
- Head teacher: Fumihiko Yasuda
- Grades: 7–12
- Gender: Girls (1902–1999); Co-educational (2000–present)
- Age range: 12–18
- Language: Japanese
- Student Union/Association: 京都橘生徒会 (Kyoto Tachibana Student Council)
- Colors: 古代紫 (Ancient purple)
- Slogan: 自立・共生 (Independence and Coexistence)
- Song: 京都橘中学校・高等学校校歌 (School Song of Kyoto Tachibana Junior and Senior High School)
- Fight song: 橘魂 (Tachibana Soul)
- Website: www.tachibana-hs.jp

Kyoto Tachibana Junior and Senior High School is a private junior and senior high school in Kyoto, Japan. It is known for its brass band and football club activities.The Senbatsu Ruikei course of this school is recorded 14.5 times the magnification in the 2023 entrance examination and ranked first in private high schools in Kyoto Prefecture.

== History ==
- May 2, 1902: Kyoto Handicraft Girls' School is founded in Kyoto.
- November 1948: Kyoto Handicraft Girls' High School was approved as a new high school.
- May 1, 1957: Renamed Kyoto Tachibana Girls' High School.
- April 2000: Renamed Kyoto Tachibana High School. Became co-educational.

== Club activities ==
It is well known for its brass band, football club, and volleyball clubs. The Kyoto Tachibana SHS Band (brass band), known as the Orange Devils, have participated in the All Japan Marching Contest many times, and have won several gold prizes. They have also been invited to the Rose Parade in the United States several times. In 2022, they were invited to a National Day event in Taiwan. The football club has won several tournaments in Kyoto Prefecture and Kinki.

The marching band has been invited to perform at the 2012 Rose Parade, 2018 Rose Parade and the 2025 Rose Parade in Pasadena, California.

== Notable alumni ==
- Kotoe Inoue – volleyball player
- Akari Oumi – volleyball player
- Hitomi Nakamichi – volleyball player
- Ayano Kojima – volleyball player
- Keiki Nishiyama – volleyball player
- Hiroki Morisaki – footballer
- Katsuya Nakano – footballer
- Shuto Kawai – footballer
- Yuto Iwasaki – footballer
- Keiya Sento – footballer
- Taiyo Nishino – footballer
- Tomoya Koyamatsu – footballer
- Soki Yatagai – footballer
- Mai Ito – long-distance runner
- Mito Natsume – actress, model, presenter, and singer
