= Musashi Mizushima =

Japanese footballer and manager

Musashi Mizushima 水島 武蔵
Personal information
- Full name: Musashi Mizushima
- Date of birth: 10 September 1964 (age 62)
- Place of birth: Tokyo, Japan
- Height: 1.77 m (5 ft 9 1/2 in)
- Position: Midfielder

Youth career
- São Paulo

Senior career*
| Years | Team | Apps | (Gls) |
| 1984–1985 | São Paulo | | |
| 1986 | São Bento | | |
| 1987–1988 | Portuguesa | | |
| 1988 | Santos | | |
| 1989–1991 | Hitachi | 19 | (6) |
| 1991–1992 | Yokohama Flügels | 3 | (0) |

Managerial career
- 2014: Fujieda MYFC
- * Club domestic league appearances and goals

Musashi Mizushima (水島 武蔵, Mizushima Musashi; born 10 September 1964) is a former Japanese football player and manager.

== Playing career ==
Mizushima was born in Tokyo on 10 September 1964. In 1975, when he was 10 years old, he moved to Brazil and he joined São Paulo youth team. In 1984, he signed with top team. After that, he played for São Bento, Portuguesa Desportos and Santos. In 1989, he returned to Japan and joined Hitachi. In 1991, he moved to All Nippon Airways (later Yokohama Flügels). However he could hardly play in the match for injury and he retired end of 1992 season.

== Coaching career ==
In 2014, Mizushima signed with Fujieda MYFC and managed the club in 1 season.

In 2019, he worked as assistant coach at the Tajikistan national football team

== Club statistics ==
| Club performance | | | League | | Cup | | League Cup | | Total | |
| Season | Club | League | Apps | Goals | Apps | Goals | Apps | Goals | Apps | Goals |
| Japan | | | League | | Emperor's Cup | | J.League Cup | | Total | |
|---|---|---|---|---|---|---|---|---|---|---|
| 1989/90 | Hitachi | JSL Division 1 | 12 | 0 | | | 0 | 0 | 12 | 0 |
| 1990/91 | Hitachi | JSL Division 2 | 7 | 6 | | | 0 | 0 | 7 | 6 |
| 1991/92 | All Nippon Airways | JSL Division 1 | 3 | 0 | 0 | 0 | 0 | 0 | 3 | 0 |
| 1992 | Yokohama Flügels | J1 League | - | | 0 | 0 | 1 | 0 | 1 | 0 |
| Total | | | 22 | 6 | 0 | 0 | 1 | 0 | 23 | 6 |

== Managerial statistics ==
| Team | From | To | Record | | | | |
| Team | From | To | G | W | D | L | Win % |
|---|---|---|---|---|---|---|---|
| Fujieda MYFC | 2014 | 2014 | 33 | 7 | 9 | 17 | 21.21 |
| Total | | | 33 | 7 | 9 | 17 | 21.21 |
