= Kohei Tomita =

Japanese footballer

Kohei Tomita 冨田 康平
Personal information
- Full name: Kohei Tomita
- Date of birth: June 9, 1996 (age 30)
- Place of birth: Saitama, Japan
- Height: 1.76 m (5 ft 9 1/2 in)
- Position: Defender

Team information
- Current team: AC Nagano Parceiro
- Number: 3

Youth career
- 2012–2014: Ichiritsu Urawa High School

College career
| Years | Team | Apps | (Gls) |
| 2015–2018 | Waseda University | | |

Senior career*
| Years | Team | Apps | (Gls) |
| 2018–2022 | Kyoto Sanga FC | 19 | (0) |
| 2022–2023 | FC Imabari | 50 | (1) |
| 2024– | AC Nagano Parceiro | 45 | (2) |
- * Club domestic league appearances and goals as of 17 August 2026

Kohei Tomita (冨田 康平, Tomita Kōhei; born June 9, 1996) is a Japanese professional footballer who plays as a defender for AC Nagano Parceiro

== Playing career ==
Tomita was born in Saitama Prefecture on June 9, 1996. He joined J2 League club Kyoto Sanga FC in 2018.

== Career statistics ==
As of 3 November 2023

Appearances and goals by club, season and competition
| Club | Season | League | | | National Cup | | League Cup | | Other | | Total | |
| Club | Season | Division | Apps | Goals | Apps | Goals | Apps | Goals | Apps | Goals | Apps | Goals |
| Japan | | | League | | Emperor's Cup | | J. League Cup | | Other | | Total | |
|---|---|---|---|---|---|---|---|---|---|---|---|---|
| Kyoto Sanga | 2018 | J2 League | 2 | 0 | 0 | 0 | – | | – | | 2 | 0 |
| Kyoto Sanga | 2019 | J2 League | 9 | 0 | 1 | 0 | – | | – | | 10 | 0 |
| Kyoto Sanga | 2020 | J2 League | 8 | 0 | 0 | 0 | – | | – | | 8 | 0 |
| Kyoto Sanga | 2021 | J2 League | 0 | 0 | 1 | 0 | – | | – | | 1 | 0 |
| Kyoto Sanga | Total | | 19 | 0 | 2 | 0 | 0 | 0 | 0 | 0 | 21 | 0 |
| FC Imabari | 2022 | J3 League | 28 | 1 | 1 | 0 | – | | – | | 29 | 1 |
| FC Imabari | 2023 | J3 League | 22 | 0 | 2 | 0 | – | | – | | 24 | 0 |
| FC Imabari | Total | | 50 | 1 | 3 | 0 | 0 | 0 | 0 | 0 | 53 | 1 |
| Career total | | | 69 | 1 | 5 | 0 | 0 | 0 | 0 | 0 | 74 | 1 |
