= Yamashiro Park Taiyogaoka Stadium =

Athletic stadium in Uji, Kyoto, Japan

Coordinates: 34°52′11″N 135°48′14″E

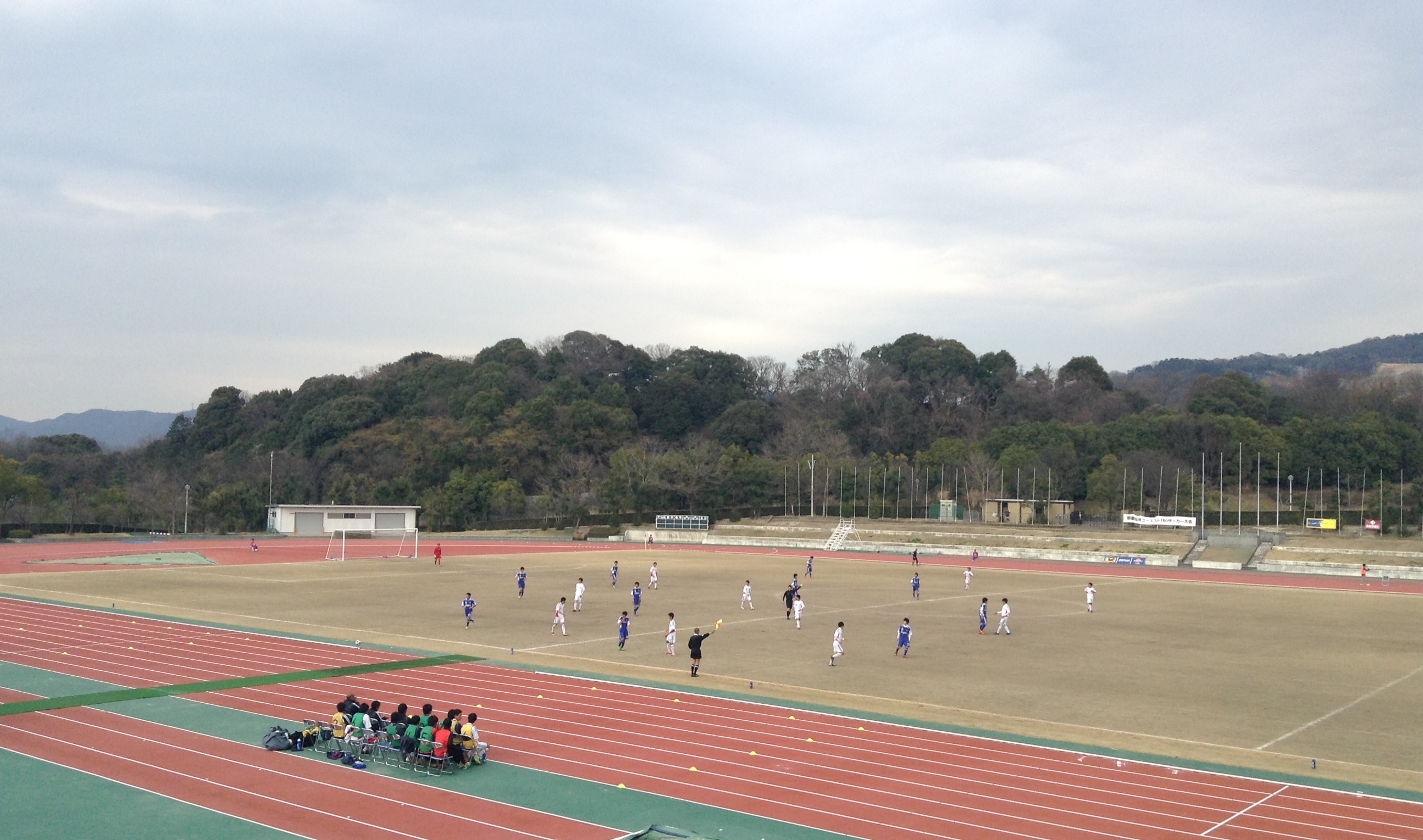
- Interactive map of Yamashiro Park Taiyogaoka Stadium
- Location: Uji, Kyoto, Japan
- Owner: Kyoto Prefecture
- Capacity: 7,000

Construction
- Opened: 1982

Tenant
- Ococias Kyoto AC

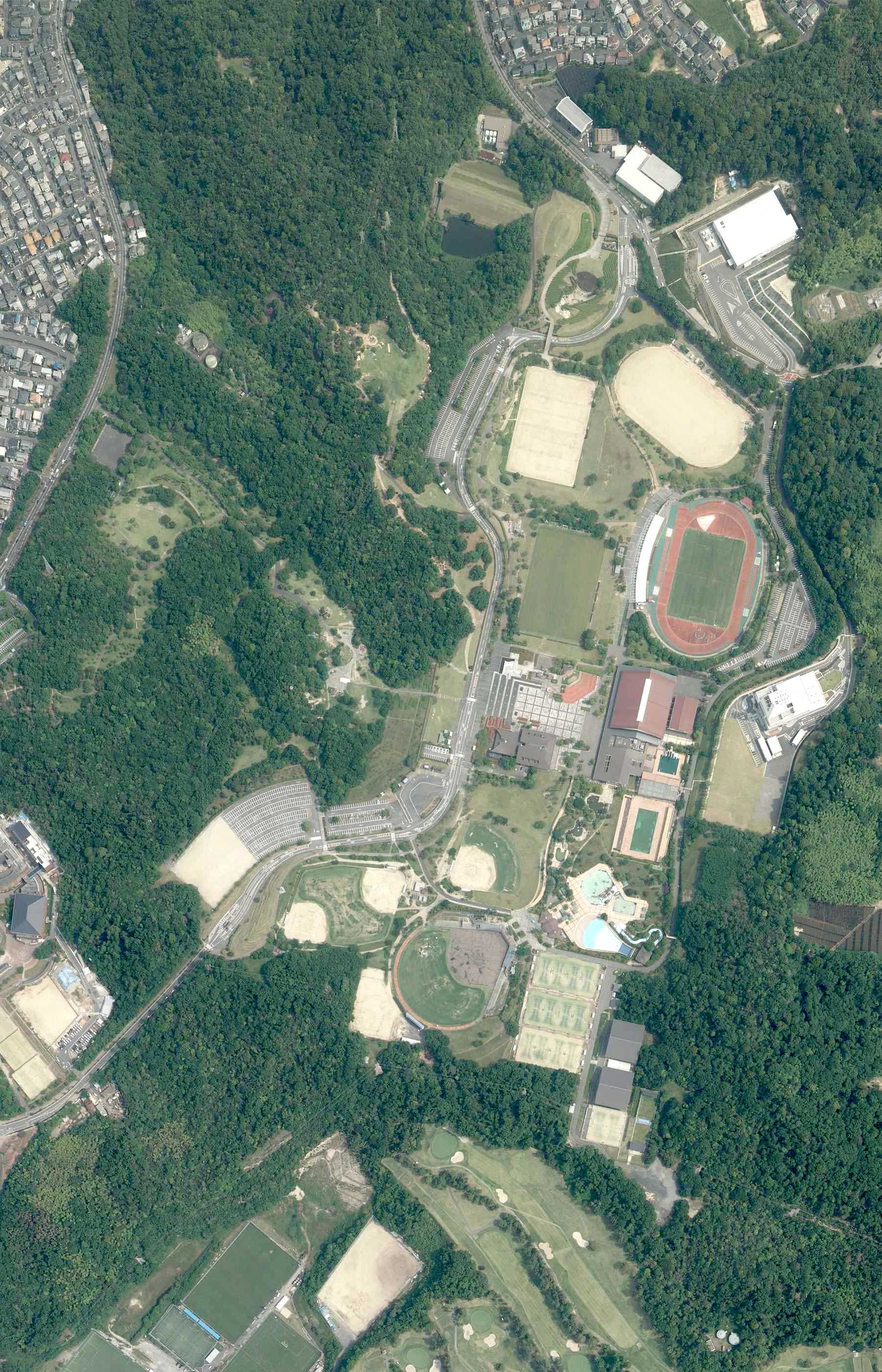
Aerial photograph of Yamashiro Sports Park

Yamashiro Park Taiyogaoka Stadium is an athletic stadium in Uji, Kyoto, Japan.
