= Uheiji Uehata =

Japanese footballer

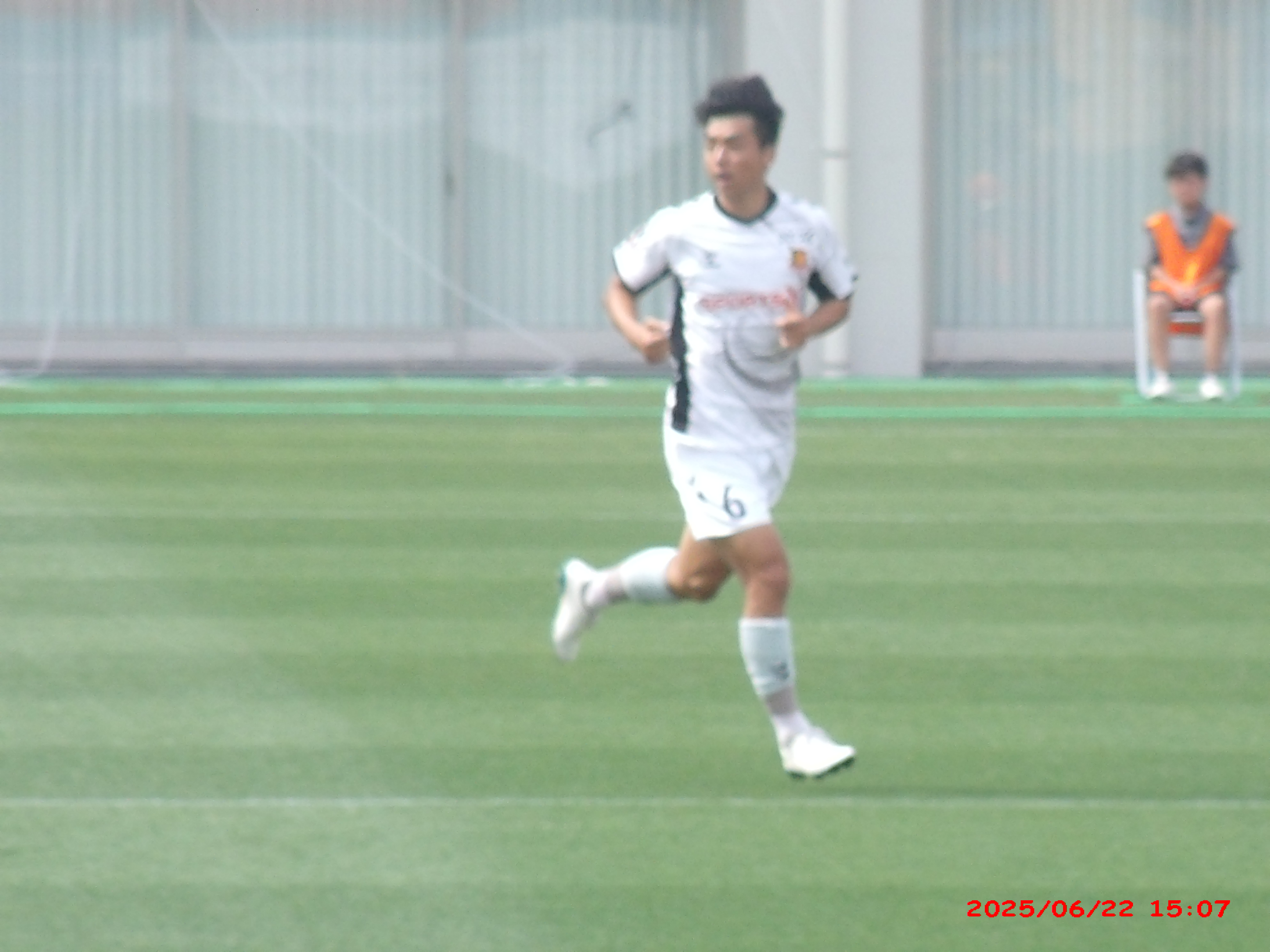

Personal information
- Full name: Uheiji Uehata
- Date of birth: 25 July 1998 (age 28)
- Place of birth: Nishinomiya, Hyōgo, Japan
- Height: 1.78 m (5 ft 10 in)
- Position: Midfielder

Team information
- Current team: Fujieda MYFC
- Number: 41

Youth career
- –2010: Takasu SC
- 2011–2016: Cerezo Osaka

College career
Years	Team	Apps	(Gls)
2017–2020	Sanno Institute of Management		

Senior career*
Years	Team	Apps	(Gls)
2021–2026	Fukushima United	156	(13)
2026–	Fujieda MYFC	1	(0)
- * Club domestic league appearances and goals as of 13 August 2026

Uheiji Uehata (上畑 佑平士, Uehata Uheiji; born 25 July 1998) is a Japanese footballer currently playing as a midfielder for Fujieda MYFC.

== Early life ==
Uheiji was born in Nishinomiya. He played for Takasu SC and Cerezo Osaka's youth teams before going to the Sanno Institute of Management.

== Career ==
Uheiji made his debut for Fukushima against Vanraure Hachinohe on the 16th of May 2021. He scored his first goal for the club on the 28th of August 2021, in the 70th minute against Gifu.

== Career statistics ==
=== Club ===
As of 17 May 2021.

Club	Season	League			National Cup		League Cup		Other		Total	
Club	Season	Division	Apps	Goals	Apps	Goals	Apps	Goals	Apps	Goals	Apps	Goals
Fukushima United	2021	J3 League	1	0	0	0	–		0	0	1	0
Career total			1	0	0	0	0	0	0	0	1	0
