= Daigo Furukawa =

Japanese footballer (born 1999)

Daigo Furukawa 古川 大悟
Personal information
- Full name: Daigo Furukawa
- Date of birth: 15 September 1999 (age 27)
- Place of birth: Mobara, Chiba, Japan
- Height: 1.78 m (5 ft 10 in)
- Position: Forward

Team information
- Current team: Oita Trinita
- Number: 34

Youth career
- FC Mobara
- Nagao FC
- 2012–2017: JEF United Chiba

Senior career*
Years	Team	Apps	(Gls)
2017–2020	JEF United Chiba	2	(0)
2019–2020	→ Veertien Mie (loan)	28	(8)
2021–2023	Iwaki FC	52	(14)
2023	→ FC Osaka (loan)	34	(9)
2024	FC Osaka	37	(7)
2025–2026	Renofa Yamaguchi	48	(8)
2026–	Oita Trinita	2	(0)
- * Club domestic league appearances and goals as of 16 August 2026

Daigo Furukawa (古川 大悟, Furukawa Daigo; born September 15, 1999) is a Japanese football player who currently plays for Oita Trinita.

== Career ==
=== JEF United ===
After 5 years in the youth team, Daigo Furukawa was promoted to professional J2 League club JEF United Chiba on 25 February 2017, as a Class 2 player. He made his league debut against Oita Trinita on 1 July 2017. On 4 November 2017, he was promoted to the first team.

=== Loan to Veertien Mie ===
On 19 August 2019, Furukawa was loaned to the JFL club Veertien Mie.

=== Iwaki ===
Furukawa joined the JFL Club Iwaki FC in 2021. Furukawa helped his club to J3 league promotion for the first time in the teams' history. He was selected to the JFL's Best Eleven the following year. One year later, he helped his club to J2 league promotion after defeating Kagoshima United 3–0 on 5 November 2022, as well as J3 Champions for the first time in history.

=== Loan to FC Osaka ===
On 28 December 2022, Furukawa was loaned to J3 club FC Osaka for the upcoming 2023 season. He made his league debut against Kagoshima United on 4 March 2023. Furukawa scored his first league goal against Ehime on 26 March 2023, scoring in the 35th minute.

=== FC Osaka ===
On 9 December 2023, it was announced that Furukawa had permanently joined FC Osaka. He made his league debut against Nagano Parceiro on 25 February 2024. Furukawa scored his first league goal against Azul Claro Numazu on 28 April 2024, scoring in the 10th minute.

== International career ==
Furukawa was selected in the U18 Japan squad for the 2017 Qatar tour.

== Career statistics ==
=== Club ===
Updated to the start of 2023 season.

Appearances and goals by club, season and competition
Club	Season	League			Emperor's Cup		Total	
Club	Season	Division	Apps	Goals	Apps	Goals	Apps	Goals
JEF United Chiba	2017	J2 League	2	0	2	0	4	0
JEF United Chiba	2018	J2 League	–		1	0	1	0
JEF United Chiba	2019	J2 League	–				0	0
Veertien Mie (loan)	2019	JFL	13	3	–		13	3
Veertien Mie (loan)	2020	JFL	15	5	–		15	5
Iwaki FC	2021	JFL	30	11	1	0	31	11
Iwaki FC	2022	J3 League	22	3	–		22	3
FC Osaka (loan)	2023	J3 League	0	0	0	0	0	0
Career total			82	22	4	0	86	22

== Honours ==
Iwaki FC

- Japan Football League: 2021
- J3 League: 2022

Individual

- JFL Best Eleven : 2021
