= Katsuya Nakano =

Japanese professional footballer

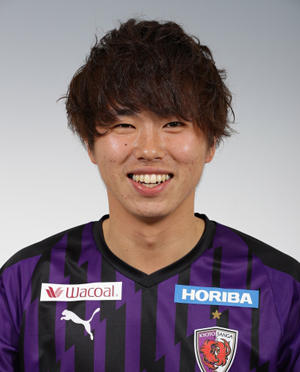
- Nakano with Kyoto Sanga

Personal information
- Date of birth: 13 September 1996 (age 30)
- Place of birth: Nara, Nara, Japan
- Height: 1.68 m (5 ft 6 in)
- Position: Midfielder

Team information
- Current team: Tochigi SC
- Number: 81

Youth career
- Torimi SSS
- YF Nara Tesoro
- 2012–2014: Kyoto Tachibana High School

College career
Years	Team	Apps	(Gls)
2015–2018	Kwansei Gakuin University		

Senior career*
Years	Team	Apps	(Gls)
2019–2021	Kyoto Sanga	33	(2)
2022–2024	FC Ryukyu	67	(13)
2024–2025	Omiya Ardija	20	(0)
2025–	Tochigi SC	43	(12)
- * Club domestic league appearances and goals as of 17 August 2026

Katsuya Nakano (中野 克哉, Nakano Katsuya; born 13 September 1996) is a Japanese professional footballer who plays as a midfielder for J3 League club Tochigi SC.
