= Sora Kobori =

Japanese footballer

Personal information
- Full name: Sora Kobori
- Date of birth: 17 December 2002 (age 23)
- Place of birth: Utsunomiya, Tochigi, Japan
- Height: 1.86 m (6 ft 1 in)
- Position: Forward

Team information
- Current team: Tochigi SC
- Number: 38

Youth career
- Re-F-Re SC
- –2020: Tochigi SC

Senior career*
| Years | Team | Apps | (Gls) |
| 2020– | Tochigi SC | 35 | (0) |
- * Club domestic league appearances and goals as of 19:45, 27 November 2023 (UTC)

Sora Kobori (小堀 空, Kobori Sora; born 17 December 2002) is a Japanese footballer currently playing as a forward for Tochigi SC.

== Early life ==
Sora was born in Utsunomiya. He played youth football for Tochigi.

== Career ==
Sora made his debut for Tochigi against JEF United Chiba on 16 December 2020.

== Career statistics ==
=== Club ===
As of 22 August 2022.

| Club | Season | League | | | National Cup | | League Cup | | Other | | Total | |
| Club | Season | Division | Apps | Goals | Apps | Goals | Apps | Goals | Apps | Goals | Apps | Goals |
|---|---|---|---|---|---|---|---|---|---|---|---|---|
| Tochigi SC | 2020 | J2 League | 1 | 0 | 0 | 0 | – | | 0 | 0 | 1 | 0 |
| Tochigi SC | 2021 | J2 League | 1 | 0 | 2 | 0 | – | | 0 | 0 | 3 | 0 |
| Tochigi SC | 2022 | J2 League | 12 | 0 | 3 | 0 | – | | 0 | 0 | 15 | 0 |
| Career total | | | 14 | 0 | 5 | 0 | 0 | 0 | 0 | 0 | 19 | 0 |
