= Hiroya Sueki =

Japanese footballer

Personal information
- Date of birth: 16 May 1997 (age 29)
- Place of birth: Fuefuki, Yamanashi, Japan
- Height: 1.76 m (5 ft 9 in)
- Position: Midfielder

Team information
- Current team: Kataller Toyama
- Number: 16

Youth career
- –2009: Fortuna SC
- 2010–2015: Ventforet Kofu

College career
| Years | Team | Apps | (Gls) |
| 2016–2019 | Hosei University | | |

Senior career*
| Years | Team | Apps | (Gls) |
| 2020– | Kataller Toyama | 190 | (13) |
- * Club domestic league appearances and goals as of 1 July 2026

Hiroya Sueki (末木 裕也, Sueki Hiroya; born 16 May 1997) is a Japanese footballer currently playing as a midfielder for Kataller Toyama.

== Career statistics ==
=== Club ===
As of 13 November 2020.

| Club | Season | League | | | National Cup | | League Cup | | Other | | Total | |
| Club | Season | Division | Apps | Goals | Apps | Goals | Apps | Goals | Apps | Goals | Apps | Goals |
|---|---|---|---|---|---|---|---|---|---|---|---|---|
| Hosei University | 2019 | – | | | 3 (Note: Appearance(s) in Emperor's Cup) | 0 | – | | 0 | 0 | 3 | 0 |
| Kataller Toyama | 2020 | J3 League | 23 | 1 | 0 | 0 | – | | 0 | 0 | 23 | 1 |
| Career total | | | 23 | 1 | 3 | 0 | 0 | 0 | 0 | 0 | 26 | 1 |
