= Hiroto Sese =

Japanese footballer

Hiroto Sese 世瀬 啓人
Personal information
- Full name: Hiroto Sese
- Date of birth: 20 August 1999 (age 27)
- Place of birth: Kurayoshi, Tottori, Japan
- Height: 1.81 m (5 ft 11 in)
- Position: Midfielder

Team information
- Current team: Fujieda MYFC
- Number: 6

Youth career
- FC Camino
- 2015–2017: Gainare Tottori

Senior career*
Years	Team	Apps	(Gls)
2018–2024	Gainare Tottori	139	(6)
2024–	Fujieda MYFC	45	(1)
- * Club domestic league appearances and goals as of 1 January 2026

Hiroto Sese (世瀬 啓人, Sese Hiroto; born 20 August 1999) is a Japanese professional footballer who plays as a midfielder for Fujieda MYFC.

== Career ==
Sese has grown through Gainare Tottori youth ranks, then he got promoted to the top team in January 2018.
