= Niki Urakami =

Japanese footballer

Niki Urakami 浦上 仁騎
Personal information
- Date of birth: 11 November 1996 (age 29)
- Place of birth: Ibaraki, Japan
- Height: 1.77 m (5 ft 10 in)
- Position: Defender

Team information
- Current team: Hokkaido Consadole Sapporo
- Number: 50

Youth career
- 2003–2005: RJC Koga SS
- 2006–2008: Koga SS
- 2009–2014: Omiya Ardija

College career
| Years | Team | Apps | (Gls) |
| 2015–2018 | Toyo University | | |

Senior career*
| Years | Team | Apps | (Gls) |
| 2019–2020 | Nagano Parceiro | 58 | (0) |
| 2021–2022 | Ventforet Kofu | 75 | (2) |
| 2023–2025 | Omiya Ardija/RB Omiya Ardija | 62 | (4) |
| 2025– | Hokkaido Consadole Sapporo | 20 | (0) |
- * Club domestic league appearances and goals as of 13 August 2026

Niki Urakami (浦上 仁騎, Urakami Niki; born 11 November 1996) is a Japanese footballer who plays as a defender for J2 League club Hokkaido Consadole Sapporo.

== Career statistics ==
As of 28 March 2021.

Appearances and goals by club, season and competition
| Club | Season | League | | | Emperor's Cup | | J.League Cup | | Other | | Total | |
| Club | Season | Division | Apps | Goals | Apps | Goals | Apps | Goals | Apps | Goals | Apps | Goals |
|---|---|---|---|---|---|---|---|---|---|---|---|---|
| Nagano Parceiro | 2019 | J3 League | 24 | 0 | 0 | 0 | — | | 0 | 0 | 24 | 0 |
| Nagano Parceiro | 2020 | J3 League | 34 | 0 | 0 | 0 | — | | 0 | 0 | 34 | 0 |
| Nagano Parceiro | Total | | 58 | 0 | 0 | 0 | 0 | 0 | 0 | 0 | 58 | 0 |
| Ventforet Kofu | 2021 | J2 League | 2 | 0 | 0 | 0 | — | | 0 | 0 | 2 | 0 |
| Career total | | | 60 | 0 | 0 | 0 | 0 | 0 | 0 | 0 | 60 | 0 |

== Honours ==
Ventforet Kofu

- Emperor's Cup: 2022

RB Omiya Ardija

- J3 League: 2024

Individual

- J3 League Best XI: 2024
