= 2026 Sanfrecce Hiroshima season =

Sanfrecce Hiroshima
2026 season
- Manager: (Germany) Bartosch Gaul
- Stadium: Edion Peace Wing Hiroshima
- Average home league attendance: 26,390
Home colours	Away colours

The 2026 season was the 91st season in the history of Sanfrecce Hiroshima.

== Squad ==
=== Season squad ===
Squad no.	Name	Nationality	Date of birth	Last Club	Contract Since	Contract Till
Goalkeepers
1	Keisuke Ōsako	(Japan)	28 July 1999 (age 27)	Youth Team	2018	2026
21	Yudai Tanaka	(Japan)	17 November 1995 (age 30)	(Japan) Blaublitz Akita	2023	
38	Cailen Hill	(Japan) (Australia)	9 July 2002 (age 24)	(Japan) Waseda University	2025	2027
43	Hikaru Ogawa	(Japan)	24 June 2007 (age 19)	Youth Team		
99	Ouchi Issei	(Japan) (Italy)	8 September 2000 (age 26)	(Japan) Matsumoto Yamaga	2026	2027
Defenders
3	Taichi Yamasaki	(Japan)	8 January 2001 (age 25)	(Japan) Juntendo University	2023	2026
4	Hayato Araki	(Japan)	7 August 1996 (age 30)	(Japan) Kansai University	2019	
13	Naoto Arai	(Japan)	7 October 1996 (age 30)	(Japan) Albirex Niigata	2024	2027
15	Shuto Nakano	(Japan)	27 June 2000 (age 26)	(Japan) Toin University of Yokohama FC	2022	2027
16	Takaaki Shichi	(Japan)	27 December 1993 (age 32)	(Japan) Avispa Fukuoka	2023	
19	Sho Sasaki	(Japan)	2 October 1989 (age 37)	(Japan) Ventforet Kofu	2015	2026
25	Yusuke Chajima	(Japan)	20 July 1991 (age 35)	(Japan) JEF United Chiba	2014	2027
27	Osamu Henry Iyoha	(Japan) (Nigeria)	23 June 1998 (age 28)	(Japan) RB Omiya Ardija	2017	
33	Tsukasa Shiotani	(Japan)	5 December 1988 (age 37)	(Japan) Mito HollyHock	2012	
37	Kim Ju-sung	(South Korea)	12 December 2000 (age 25)	(South Korea) FC Seoul	2025	2027
Midfielders
6	Hayao Kawabe	(Japan)	8 September 1995 (age 31)	(Belgium) Standard Liège	2024	2027
14	Yasushi Matsumoto	(Japan)	22 August 1998 (age 28)	(Japan) Urawa Red Diamonds	2026	
24	Shunki Higashi	(Japan)	28 July 2000 (age 26)	Youth Team	2018	2026
30	Tolgay Arslan	(Germany) (Turkey)	16 August 1990 (age 36)	(Australia) Melbourne City	2024	2026
32	Sota Koshimichi	(Japan)	3 April 2004 (age 22)	Youth Team	2022	2026
35	Yotaro Nakajima	(Japan)	22 April 2006 (age 20)	Youth Team	2025	2028
40	Motoki Ohara	(Japan)	9 March 2000 (age 26)	(Japan) Albirex Niigata	2022	
45	Shimon Kobayashi	(Japan)	23 January 2008 (age 18)	Youth Team	2025	2028
Strikers
9	Ryo Germain	(Japan) (United States)	19 April 1995 (age 31)	(Japan) Júbilo Iwata	2025	2026
10	Akito Suzuki	(Japan)	30 July 2003 (age 23)	(Japan) Shonan Bellmare	2025	
11	Mutsuki Kato	(Japan)	6 August 1997 (age 29)	(Japan) Cerezo Osaka	2023	
17	Kosuke Kinoshita	(Japan)	3 October 1994 (age 32)	(Japan) Kashiwa Reysol	2025	2027
18	Daiki Suga	(Japan)	10 September 1998 (age 28)	(Japan) Hokkaido Consadole Sapporo	2025	
23	Shun Ayukawa	(Japan)	15 September 2001 (age 25)	(Japan) Oita Trinita	2025	
39	Sota Nakamura	(Japan)	15 October 2002 (age 24)	(Japan) Meiji University	2025	2027
41	Naoki Maeda	(Japan)	17 November 1994 (age 31)	(Japan) Urawa Red Diamonds	2025	2027
Players who left on loan
36	Aren Inoue	(Japan)	19 September 2006 (age 20)	Youth Team	2025	2027
44	Taishi Semba	(Japan)	19 August 1999 (age 27)	(Japan) Mito Hollyhock	2022	
	Kohei Hosoya	(Japan)	11 December 2001 (age 24)	(Japan) Ehime FC	2025	
Players who left permanently

== Club officials ==
Club officials for 2026.

Position	Name
Manager	(Germany) Bartosz Gaul
Assistant manager	(Germany) Arne Janssen (Japan) Shin Nakamura (Japan) Toshihiro Aoyama
Goalkeeper coach	(Japan) Shinkichi Kikuchi (Japan) Takuto Hayashi
Physical coach	(Japan) Hiroshi Sato
High performance coach	(Japan) Mineichi Isobe
Analyst	(Japan) Masaru Mikado

== Friendly ==
=== Tour of Okinawa ===
Win Draw Loss

15 January 1	Fukuoka University	0–6	Sanfrecce Hiroshima	Okinawa
			Motoki Ohara 16'; Ryo Germain 35'; Riki Kato 69'; Naoto Arai 72'; Naoki Maeda 85'; Sota Koshimichi 89'	Stadium: Soccer Park Akanma

18 January 2	FC Tokyo	4–3	Sanfrecce Hiroshima	Okinawa
	Tsuna Kominato 74', 81', 104'; 108'		Riki Kato 22'; Ryo Germain 73'; Shun Ayukawa 100'	Stadium: Nishizaki Athletics Stadium

24 January 3	Kashiwa Reysol	1–4	Sanfrecce Hiroshima	Miyazaki
		Report	Daichi Yamazaki; Kim Joo-sung; Riki Kato; Sota Nakamura	Stadium: Seagaia Event Square 1

== Transfers ==
=== In ===
Pre-season

Position	Player	Transferred from	Fee	Ref
Permanent Transfer
21 December 2025	GK	(Japan) (Italy) Ouchi Issei	(Japan) Matsumoto Yamaga FC	Free
25 December 2025	FW	(Japan) Makoto Mitsuta	(Japan) Gamba Osaka	End of loan
26 December 2025	DF	(Japan) Takaaki Shichi	(Japan) Avispa Fukuoka	End of loan
26 December 2025	FW	(Japan) Shion Inoue	(Japan) Júbilo Iwata	End of loan
28 December 2025	FW	(Japan) Akito Suzuki	(Japan) Shonan Bellmare	Free
29 December 2025	MF	(Japan) Motoki Ohara	(Japan) Albirex Niigata	End of loan
29 December 2025	FW	(Japan) Shun Ayukawa	(Japan) Oita Trinita	End of loan
29 December 2025	MF	(Japan) Kohei Hosoya	(Japan) Ehime FC	End of loan
31 December 2025	DF	(Japan) (Nigeria) Shota Kofie Kobuki	(Japan) Iwaki FC	End of loan
2 January 2026	DF	(Japan) (Nigeria) Osamu Henry Iyoha	(Japan) RB Omiya Ardija (J2)	End of loan
2 January 2026	MF	(Japan) Taishi Semba	(Japan) Mito Hollyhock	End of loan
3 January 2026	MF	(Japan) Yasushi Matsumoto	(Japan) Urawa Red Diamonds	Free
6 January 2026	FW	(Japan) Ryo Tanada	(Japan) Gainare Tottori	End of loan
Loan Transfer

Post-season

Date	Position	Player	Transferred from	Ref
Permanent Transfer
30 June 2026	MF	(Japan) Kohei Hosoya	(Japan) Ehime FC	End of loan
30 June 2026	DF	(Japan) (Nigeria) Shota Kofie Kobuki	(Japan) Iwaki FC	End of loan
30 June 2026	FW	(Japan) Aren Inoue	(Japan) Matsumoto Yamaga	End of loan
30 June 2026	DF	(Japan) (Nigeria) Osamu Henry Iyoha	(Japan) RB Omiya Ardija (J2)	End of loan
30 June 2026	MF	(Japan) Taishi Semba	(Japan) Mito Hollyhock	End of loan
Loan Transfer

=== Out ===
Pre-season

Date	Position	Player	Transferred from	Fee
Permanent Transfer
29 November 2025	MF	(Brazil) Marcos Júnior	(Brazil) Cuiabá	Free
4 December 2025	FW	(France) Valère Germain	Retired	N.A.
8 December 2025	GK	(South Korea) Jeong Min-ki	(South Korea) Suwon FC	End of loan
26 December 2025	FW	(Japan) Makoto Mitsuta	(Japan) Gamba Osaka	Undisclosed
27 December 2025	FW	(Japan) Shion Inoue	(Japan) Júbilo Iwata	Undisclosed
30 December 2025	MF	(Japan) Satoshi Tanaka	(Germany) Fortuna Dusseldorf	Undisclosed
7 January 2026	FW	(Japan) Ryo Tanada	(Japan)	Free
Loan Transfer
30 December 2025	MF	(Japan) Kohei Hosoya	(Japan) Ehime FC	Season loan
31 December 2025	DF	(Japan) (Nigeria) Shota Kofie Kobuki	(Japan) Iwaki FC	Season loan
2 January 2026	FW	(Japan) Aren Inoue	(Japan) Matsumoto Yamaga	Season loan
3 January 2026	DF	(Japan) (Nigeria) Osamu Henry Iyoha	(Japan) RB Omiya Ardija (J2)	Season loan
3 January 2026	MF	(Japan) Taishi Semba	(Japan) Mito Hollyhock	Season loan

Post-season

Date	Position	Player	Transferred to	Ref
Permanent Transfer
27 May 2026	MF	(Japan) Yusuke Chajima	Retired	N.A.
27 May 2026	MF	(Germany) (Turkey) Tolgay Arslan	Retired	N.A.
12 June 2026	FW	(Japan) Ryo Germain	(Japan) Shimizu S-Pulse	Undisclosed
June 2026	MF	(Japan) Shunki Higashi	(Japan) Machida Zelvia	Undisclosed
Loan Transfer

== Competitions ==
=== J1 League ===
Pos	Team	Pld	W	PKW	PKL	L	GF	GA	GD	Pts	Qualification
1	Vissel Kobe	18	9	2	4	3	27	21	+6	35	Final
2	Cerezo Osaka	18	7	4	2	5	26	19	+7	31	3rd–4th place playoff
3	Nagoya Grampus	18	8	2	3	5	31	28	+3	31	5th–6th place playoff
4	Sanfrecce Hiroshima	18	8	2	2	6	29	21	+8	30	7th–8th place playoff
5	Gamba Osaka	18	5	5	3	5	26	22	+4	28	9th–10th place playoff
6	Fagiano Okayama	18	6	2	4	6	24	25	−1	26	11th–12th place playoff
7	Shimizu S-Pulse	18	4	4	4	6	19	21	−2	24	13th–14th place playoff
8	Kyoto Sanga	18	5	3	2	8	19	26	−7	23	15th–16th place playoff
9	V-Varen Nagasaki	18	6	1	1	10	20	28	−8	21	17th–18th place playoff
10	Avispa Fukuoka	18	3	4	4	7	17	27	−10	21	19th–20th place playoff

Source: JLeague.co, J.League Data Site
Rules for classification: 1) Points; 2) Goal difference; 3) Goals scored; 4) Head-to-head.

==== Matches ====
6 February 1	V-Varen Nagasaki	1–3	Sanfrecce Hiroshima	Nagasaki
	Matheus Matheus 81'	Report	Shuto Nakano 35'; Akito Suzuki 50'; Hayao Kawabe 54'	Stadium: Peace Stadium Connected by SoftBank; Attendance: 20,134; Referee: Takafumi Mikuriya

14 February 2	Sanfrecce Hiroshima	1–1 (5–4 p)	Fagiano Okayama	Hiroshima
	Ryo Germain 45+2'	Report	Ataru Esaka 10'; Hiroshi Omori (yellow card) 45'; Kosei Ogura (yellow card) 46' (yellow-red card) 71'	Stadium: Edion Peace Wing Hiroshima; Referee: Futoshi Nakamura
	Penalties
	Tolgay Arslan (penalty scored); Kosuke Kinoshita (penalty scored); Sōta Nakamura (penalty scored); Daiki Suga (penalty scored); Tsukasa Shiotani (penalty scored)		Kazunari Ichimi (penalty scored); Kosuke Shirai (penalty scored); Takaya Kimura (penalty scored); Kaito Fujii (penalty missed); Yūta Kamiya (penalty scored)

22 February 3	Cerezo Osaka	1–2	Sanfrecce Hiroshima	Osaka
	Solomon Sakuragawa 90+5'; Motohiko Nakajima (yellow card) 79'; Shinji Kagawa (yellow card) 90+10'	Report	Ryo Germain 55'; Shunki Higashi 90+7'	Stadium: Yodoko Sakura Stadium; Attendance: 21,013; Referee: Yusuke Ohashi

27 February 4	Sanfrecce Hiroshima	1–2	Kyoto Sanga	Hiroshima
	Hayato Araki 39'; Hidehiro Sugai (yellow card) 36'; Shinnosuke Fukuda (yellow card) 41'; Arne Janssen (yellow card) 90+7'	Report	Rafael Elias 81' (yellow card) 38'; Henrique Trevisan 90+3' (yellow card) 90+8'; Taiyo Hiraoka (yellow card) 88'	Stadium: Edion Peace Wing Hiroshima; Attendance: 26,042; Referee: Hiroyuki Kimura

27 March 5 (Rescheduled)	Vissel Kobe	2–1	Sanfrecce Hiroshima	Kobe
	Takahiro Ogihara 85' (pen.); Yuya Osako 90+4'; Mitsuki Hidaka (yellow card) 10'; Matheus Thuler (yellow card) 53'; Diego (yellow card) 90+3'	Report	Kosuke Kinoshita 50'	Stadium: Noevir Stadium Kobe; Attendance: 19,200; Referee: Koichiro Fukushima

14 March 6	Sanfrecce Hiroshima	2–0	Gamba Osaka	Hiroshima
	Naoto Arai 41'; Sōta Nakamura 68'; Taishi Matsumoto (yellow card) 32'; Taichi Yamasaki (yellow card) 90+2'	Report	Shuto Abe (yellow card) 49'; Takeru Kishimoto (yellow card) 66' (yellow-red card) 85'; Riku Handa (yellow card) 89'	Stadium: Edion Peace Wing Hiroshima; Attendance: 26,671; Referee: Hiroki Kasahara

18 March 7	Nagoya Grampus	2–1	Sanfrecce Hiroshima	Toyota
	Yuya Yamagishi 5' (yellow card) 19'; Yudai Kimura 70'; Michael Petrovic (yellow card) 71'	Report	Akito Suzuki 50'; Naoto Arai (yellow card) 25'; Ryo Germain (yellow card) 30'	Stadium: Toyota Stadium; Attendance: 18,242; Referee: Daichi Shiino

22 March 8	Shimizu S-Pulse	3–1	Sanfrecce Hiroshima	Shizuoka
	Yutaka Yoshida 20'; Oh Se-Hun 22'; Koya Kitagawa 67'	Report	Ryo Germain 85'; Hayato Araki (yellow card) 90+1'	Stadium: IAI Stadium Nihondaira; Attendance: 16,012; Referee: Ryo Tanimoto

5 April 9	Sanfrecce Hiroshima	0–1	Avispa Fukuoka	Hiroshima
	Tolgay Arslan (yellow card) 75'; Naoto Arai (yellow card) 90+4'	Report	Yu Hashimoto 17'; Shosei Usui (yellow card) 51'; Masaya Tashiro (yellow card) 64'; Kazuki Fujita (yellow card) 90+5'	Stadium: Edion Peace Wing Hiroshima; Attendance: 26,050; Referee: Koji Takasaki

11 April 10	Sanfrecce Hiroshima	1–1 (5–4 p)	Shimizu S-Pulse	Hiroshima
	Kosuke Kinoshita 75'; Yotaro Nakajima (yellow card) 86'	Report	Oh Se-Hun 72'	Stadium: Edion Peace Wing Hiroshima; Attendance: 26,488; Referee: Koei Koya
	Penalties
	Akito Suzuki (penalty scored); Sōta Nakamura (penalty scored); Shunki Higashi (penalty scored); Yotaro Nakajima (penalty scored); Kosuke Kinoshita (penalty scored)		Oh Se-Hun (penalty scored); Matheus Bueno (penalty scored); Alfredo Stephens (penalty scored); Kazuki Kozuka (penalty missed); Zento Uno (penalty scored)

18 April 11	Sanfrecce Hiroshima	2–0	V-Varen Nagasaki	Hiroshima
	Akito Suzuki 10'; Mutsuki Kato 52'	Report	Diego Pituca (yellow card) 30' (yellow-red card) 90+2'; Thiago Santana (yellow card) 39'	Stadium: Edion Peace Wing Hiroshima; Attendance: 25,623; Referee: Hayato Shimizu

25 April 12	Sanfrecce Hiroshima	2–1	Cerezo Osaka	Hiroshima
	Dion Cool 80' (o.g.); Kosuke Kinoshita 90+4' (pen.); Tsukasa Shiotani (yellow card) 64'	Report	Thiago Andrade 12'; Ayumu Ohata (yellow card) 54'	Stadium: Edion Peace Wing Hiroshima; Attendance: 25,547; Referee: Yuzo Sutani

29 April 13	Avispa Fukuoka	2–2 (4–3 p)	Sanfrecce Hiroshima	Fukuoka
	Shosei Usui 20'; Tomoya Miki 73'; Mutsuki Kato (yellow card) 52'; Takumi Kamijima (yellow card) 64'; Shintaro Nago (red card) 82'; Yuma Tsujioka (yellow card) 89'	Report	Shuto Nakano 5'; Shunki Higashi 11'; Yotaro Nakajima (yellow card) 19'; Motoki Ohara (yellow card) 90+6'	Stadium: Best Denki Stadium; Attendance: 11,200; Referee: Jumpei Iida
	Penalties
	Yuma Tsujioka (penalty scored); Yuji Kitajima (penalty scored); Teppei Oka (penalty missed); Daiki Miya (penalty missed); Takumi Kamijima (penalty scored); Yu Hashimoto (penalty scored)		Tolgay Arslan (penalty scored); Naoki Maeda (penalty scored); Akito Suzuki (penalty scored); Motoki Ohara (penalty missed); Taichi Yamasaki (penalty missed); Naoto Arai (penalty missed)

2 May 14	Fagiano Okayama	1–0	Sanfrecce Hiroshima	Okayama
	Léo Gaúcho 83' (yellow card) 90+1'; Takaya Kimura (yellow card) 28'; Kazunari Ichimi (yellow card) 75'	Report	Naoto Arai (yellow card) 59'	Stadium: JFE Harenokuni Stadium; Attendance: 14,255; Referee: Ryo Tanimoto

6 May 15	Sanfrecce Hiroshima	1–1 (4–5 p)	Vissel Kobe	Hiroshima
	Mutsuki Kato 42'; Sota Nakamura (yellow card) 75'; Taichi Yamasaki (yellow card) 77'	Report	Ren Komatsu 63'; Yosuke Ideguchi (yellow card) 53'; Matheus Thuler (yellow card) 71'	Stadium: Edion Peace Wing Hiroshima; Attendance: 27,028; Referee: Futoshi Nakamura
	Penalties
	Kosuke Kinoshita (penalty missed); Akito Suzuki (penalty scored); Shunki Higashi (penalty scored); Ryo Germain (penalty scored); Sho Sasaki (penalty scored)		Yuya Osako (penalty scored); Yoshinori Muto (penalty scored); Mitsuki Hidaka (penalty scored); Rikito Inoue (penalty scored); Ren Komatsu (penalty scored)

10 May 16	Gamba Osaka	0–1	Sanfrecce Hiroshima	Osaka
		Report	Shunki Higashi 68'; Hayao Kawabe (yellow card) 49'; Naoto Arai (yellow card) 61'	Stadium: Suita City Football Stadium; Attendance: 28,360; Referee: Damian Kos (Poland)

17 May 17	Kyoto Sanga	0–4	Sanfrecce Hiroshima	Kyoto
	Henrique Trevisan (yellow card) 35'; Joao Pedro (yellow card) 65'	Report	Sota Nakamura 28'; Akito Suzuki 48'; Mutsuki Kato 50'; Taishi Matsumoto 74'; Naoto Arai (yellow card) 61'	Stadium: Sanga Stadium by Kyocera; Attendance: 16,040; Referee: Jumpei Iida

23 May 18	Sanfrecce Hiroshima	4–2	Nagoya Grampus	Hiroshima
	Sota Nakamura 32'; Hayao Kawabe 45+3' (yellow card) 42'; Shuto Nakano 47'; Akito Suzuki 56'	Report	Yuya Yamagishi 45+2'; Tsukasa Morishima 67'	Stadium: Edion Peace Wing Hiroshima; Attendance: 26,884; Referee: Yuzo Sutani

30 May Placement Leg 1	Sanfrecce Hiroshima	2–1	Kawasaki Frontale	Hiroshima
	Sota Nakamura 11'; Mutsuki Kato 20'	Report	Tatsuya Ito 43'; Marcinho (yellow card) 35'	Stadium: Edion Peace Wing Hiroshima; Attendance: 25,885; Referee: Koji Takasaki

6 June Placement Leg 2	Kawasaki Frontale	0–1 (1–3 agg.)	Sanfrecce Hiroshima	Kawasaki
	Yuichi Maruyama (yellow card) 24'; Tatsuya Ito (yellow card) 64'	Report	Sota Nakamura 44'; Hayao Kawabe (yellow card) 38'	Stadium: Kawasaki Todoroki Stadium; Attendance: 23,692; Referee: Hiroki Kasahara

=== AFC Champions League Elite ===
==== League stage ====
Win Draw Loss

16 September 2025 MD 1	Melbourne City (Australia)	0–2	(Japan) Sanfrecce Hiroshima	Melbourne, Australia
		Report	Marcos Júnior 53' (pen.); Yotaro Nakajima 81'; Shunki Higashi (yellow card) 34'; Kim Ju-sung (yellow card) 61'; Hayato Araki (yellow card) 62'	Stadium: Melbourne Rectangular Stadium; Attendance: 1,423; Referee: Payam Heydari (Iran)

30 September 2025 MD 2	Sanfrecce Hiroshima (Japan)	1–1	(China) Shanghai Port	Sanfrecce, Japan
	Hayato Araki 19'; Tsukasa Shiotani (yellow card) 16'; Kim Ju-sung (yellow card) 55'	Report	Gabrielzinho 83'; Alexander Jojo (yellow card) 77'; Gustavo (red card) 90'	Stadium: Edion Peace Wing Hiroshima; Attendance: 7,819; Referee: Alex King (Australia)

21 October 2025 MD 3	Ulsan HD FC (South Korea)	1–0	(Japan) Sanfrecce Hiroshima	Ulsan, South Korea
	Kim Min-hyeok 12'; Lee Jae-Ik (yellow card) 66'	Report	Tsukasa Shiotani (yellow card) 82'	Stadium: Ulsan Munsu Football Stadium; Attendance: 2,966; Referee: Majed Al-Shamrani (Saudi Arabia)

4 November 2025 MD 4	Sanfrecce Hiroshima (Japan)	1–0	(South Korea) Gangwon FC	Sanfrecce, Japan
	Mutsuki Kato 63'; Naoto Arai (yellow card) 22'; Sho Sasaki (yellow card) 61' (yellow-red card) 70'; Hayao Kawabe (yellow card) 90+6'; Michael Skibbe (yellow card) 90+7'	Report	Lee You-hyeon (yellow card) 66'; Marko Tući (yellow card) 69'	Stadium: Edion Peace Wing Hiroshima; Attendance: 8,924; Referee: Casey Reibelt (Australia)

25 November 2025 MD 5	Chengdu Rongcheng (China)	1–1	(Japan) Sanfrecce Hiroshima	Chengdu, China
	Felipe 53' (pen.); Timo Letschert (yellow card) 11'; Yan Dinghao (yellow card) 90+5'	Report	Mutsuki Kato 63'	Stadium: Phoenix Hill Football Stadium; Attendance: 27,836; Referee: Abdulla Ali Al Athba (Qatar)

10 December 2025 MD 6	Sanfrecce Hiroshima (Japan)	1–0	(China) Shanghai Shenhua	Sanfrecce, Japan
	Hayato Araki 78'; Ryo Germain (yellow card) 76'	Report	Shinichi Chan (yellow card) 16'; Wu Xi (yellow card) 68'; Ibrahim Amadou (yellow card) 70'	Stadium: Edion Peace Wing Hiroshima; Attendance: 13,240; Referee: Ahmad Al-Ali (Kuwait)

10 February 2026 MD 7	Sanfrecce Hiroshima (Japan)	2–1	(Malaysia) Johor Darul Ta'zim	Sanfrecce, Japan
	Akito Suzuki 18' (pen.), 48'; Hayao Kawabe (yellow card) 22'; Sota Nakamura (yellow card) 38'; Taishi Matsumoto (yellow card) 44'; Shuto Nakano (yellow card) 90+4'	Report	Marcos Guilherme 3'; Jonathan Silva (red card) 16'; Bergson (yellow card) 28'; João Figueiredo (yellow card) 38'; Nene (yellow card) 67'	Stadium: Edion Peace Wing Hiroshima; Attendance: 10,132; Referee: Ma Ning (China)

17 February 2026 MD 8	FC Seoul (South Korea)	2–2	(Japan) Sanfrecce Hiroshima	Mok-dong, South Korea
	Patryk Klimala 10' (pen.) (yellow card) 74'; Naoto Arai 27' (pen.); Lee Seung-mo (yellow card) 40'; Gu Sung-Yun (yellow card) 62'	Report	Ryo Germain 90+1'; Kosuke Kinoshita 90+6'	Stadium: Mokdong Stadium; Referee: Khalid Al-Turais (Saudi Arabia)

Pos	Team	Pld	W	D	L	GF	GA	GD	Pts	Qualification
1	(Japan) Machida Zelvia	8	5	2	1	15	7	+8	17	Advance to round of 16
2	(Japan) Vissel Kobe	8	5	1	2	14	7	+7	16	Advance to round of 16
3	(Japan) Sanfrecce Hiroshima	8	4	3	1	10	6	+4	15	Advance to round of 16
4	(Thailand) Buriram United	8	4	2	2	10	8	+2	14	Advance to round of 16
5	(Australia) Melbourne City	8	4	2	2	9	7	+2	14	Advance to round of 16

Source: AFC
Rules for classification: 1) points; 2) goal difference; 3) number of goals scored; 4) number of matches won; 5) penalty shoot-out if only two teams remain tied and played each other on the final matchday 6) fair play ranking; 7) drawing of lots

==== Knockout stage ====
4 March 2026 R16 Leg 1	Johor Darul Ta'zim (Malaysia)	3–1	(Japan) Sanfrecce Hiroshima	Johor, Malaysia
	Ager Aketxe 52'; Bergson 63' (yellow card) 64'; Marcos Guilherme 85'; Antonio Glauder (yellow card) 59'; Óscar Arribas (yellow card) 90+3'	Report	Nene 86' (o.g.); Kim Ju-Sung (yellow card) 7' (yellow-red card) 26'	Stadium: Sultan Ibrahim Stadium; Attendance: 31,225; Referee: Shaun Evans (Australia)

11 March 2025 R16 Leg 2	Sanfrecce Hiroshima (Japan)	1–0 (2–3 agg.)	(Malaysia) Johor Darul Ta'zim	Sanfrecce, Japan
	Kosuke Kinoshita 90' (pen.); Ryo Germain (yellow card) 33'; Kosuke Kinoshita (yellow card) 61'	Report	Jairo (yellow card) 29'; Nene (yellow card) 38'; Ager Aketxe (yellow card) 48'	Stadium: Edion Peace Wing Hiroshima; Referee: Khaled Al-Hoish (Saudi Arabia)

== Team statistics ==
=== Appearances and goals ===
As of 6 Jun 2026

No.	Pos.	Player	J1 League		2025–26 AFC Champions League Elite		Total	
No.	Pos.	Player	Apps	Goals	Apps	Goals	Apps	Goals
1	GK	(Japan) Keisuke Osako	16	0	4	0	20	0
3	DF	(Japan) Taichi Yamasaki	13+4	0	1+1	0	19	0
4	DF	(Japan) Hayato Araki	12	1	3	0	15	1
6	MF	(Japan) Hayao Kawabe	17+2	0	4	0	23	0
9	FW	(Japan) (United States) Ryo Germain	6+10	3	3+1	1	20	4
10	FW	(Japan) Akito Suzuki	15+6	4	4	2	25	6
11	FW	(Japan) Mutsuki Kato	10+6	4	2+2	0	20	4
13	DF	(Japan) Naoto Arai	14+3	1	1+2	0	20	1
14	MF	(Japan) Yasushi Matsumoto	13+5	1	4	0	22	1
15	DF	(Japan) Shuto Nakano	18+4	2	4	0	26	2
16	DF	(Japan) Takaaki Shichi	1+5	0	2+1	0	9	0
17	FW	(Japan) Kosuke Kinoshita	8+10	3	0+4	2	22	5
18	FW	(Japan) Daiki Suga	0	0	1+2	0	3	0
19	DF	(Japan) Sho Sasaki	14+2	0	1	0	17	0
21	GK	(Japan) Yudai Tanaka	0	0	0	0	0	0
23	FW	(Japan) Shun Ayukawa	0	0	0	0	0	0
24	MF	(Japan) Shunki Higashi	14+4	3	1+1	0	20	3
25	DF	(Japan) Yusuke Chajima	0+4	0	0	0	4	0
27	DF	(Japan) (Nigeria) Osamu Henry Iyoha	0	0	0	0	0	0
30	MF	(Germany) (Turkey) Tolgay Arslan	4+4	0	0+1	0	9	0
32	MF	(Japan) Sota Koshimichi	0	0	0	0	0	0
33	DF	(Japan) Tsukasa Shiotani	17+1	0	3	0	21	0
35	MF	(Japan) Yotaro Nakajima	4+4	0	0+1	0	9	0
37	DF	(South Korea) Kim Ju-sung	6+1	0	2	0	9	0
38	GK	(Japan) (Australia) Cailen Hill	0	0	0	0	0	0
39	FW	(Japan) Sota Nakamura	10+6	4	2+2	0	20	4
40	MF	(Japan) Motoki Ohara	3+3	0	1+1	0	8	0
41	FW	(Japan) Naoki Maeda	1+12	0	1	0	14	0
43	GK	(Japan) Hikaru Ogawa	0	0	0	0	0	0
45	MF	(Japan) Shimon Kobayashi	0+1	0	0	0	1	0
99	GK	(Japan) (Italy) Ouchi Issei	3	0	0	0	3	0
