= 2025 Sanfrecce Hiroshima season =

Sanfrecce Hiroshima
2025 season
- Manager: Michael Skibbe
- Stadium: Edion Peace Wing Hiroshima
- J1 League: 5th
- Emperor's Cup: Semi-finals
- J.League Cup: Winners
- Japanese Super Cup: Winners
- 2024–25 AFC Champions League Two: Quarter-finals
- 2025–26 AFC Champions League Elite: League stage
- Top goalscorer: League: Sota Nakamura (2); All: Sota Nakamura (4)
- Average home league attendance: 25,585
Home colours	Away colours

The 2025 season is the 90th season in the history of Sanfrecce Hiroshima and their 17th consecutive season in the J1 League. In addition to the domestic league, the club is competing in the Emperor's Cup, the J.League Cup, the Japanese Super Cup, the 2024–25 AFC Champions League Two knock-out stage and the 2025–26 AFC Champions League Elite.

== Squad ==
=== Season squad ===
Squad no.	Name	Nationality	Date of birth	Last club	Contract Since	Contract Till
Goalkeepers
1	Keisuke Ōsako	(Japan)	28 July 1999 (age 26)	Youth Team	2018	
21	Yudai Tanaka	(Japan)	17 November 1995 (age 30)	(Japan) Blaublitz Akita	2023	
26	Jeong Min-ki	(South Korea)	9 February 1996 (age 30)	(South Korea) Suwon FC	2025	
38	Cailen Hill	(Japan)	9 July 2002 (age 24)	(Japan) Waseda University	2025	2027
Defenders
3	Taichi Yamasaki	(Japan)	8 January 2001 (age 25)	(Japan) Juntendo University	2023	
4	Hayato Araki	(Japan)	7 August 1996 (age 29)	(Japan) Kansai University	2019	
13	Naoto Arai	(Japan)	7 October 1996 (age 29)	(Japan) Albirex Niigata	2024	2027
15	Shuto Nakano	(Japan)	27 June 2000 (age 26)	(Japan) Toin University of Yokohama FC	2022	2027
19	Sho Sasaki	(Japan)	2 October 1989 (age 36)	(Japan) Ventforet Kofu	2015	
25	Yusuke Chajima	(Japan)	20 July 1991 (age 34)	(Japan) JEF United Chiba	2014	
37	Kim Ju-sung	(South Korea)	12 December 2000 (age 25)	(South Korea) FC Seoul	2025	2027
Midfielders
6	Hayao Kawabe	(Japan)	8 September 1995 (age 30)	(Belgium) Standard Liège	2024	2027
10	Marcos Júnior	(Brazil)	19 January 1993 (age 33)	(Japan) Yokohama F. Marinos	2019	
14	Satoshi Tanaka	(Japan)	13 August 2002 (age 23)	(Japan) Shonan Bellmare	2025	
24	Shunki Higashi	(Japan)	28 July 2000 (age 25)	Youth Team	2018	
30	Tolgay Arslan	(Germany) (Turkey)	16 August 1990 (age 35)	(Australia) Melbourne City	2024	
32	Sota Koshimichi	(Japan)	3 April 2004 (age 22)	Youth Team	2022	
33	Tsukasa Shiotani	(Japan)	5 December 1988 (age 37)	(Japan) Mito HollyHock	2012	
35	Yotaro Nakajima	(Japan)	22 April 2006 (age 20)	Youth Team	2025	2028
44	Taishi Semba	(Japan)	19 August 1999 (age 26)	(Japan) Thespa Gunma	2022	
45	Shimon Kobayashi	(Japan)	23 January 2008 (age 18)	Youth Team	2025	2028
Strikers
9	Ryo Germain	(Japan) (United States)	19 April 1995 (age 31)	(Japan) Júbilo Iwata	2025	
17	Kosuke Kinoshita	(Japan)	3 October 1994 (age 31)	(Japan) Kashiwa Reysol	2025	2027
18	Daiki Suga	(Japan)	10 September 1998 (age 27)	(Japan) Hokkaido Consadole Sapporo	2025	
36	Aren Inoue	(Japan)	19 September 2006 (age 19)	Youth Team	2025	2027
39	Sota Nakamura	(Japan)	15 October 2002 (age 23)	(Japan) Meiji University	2025	2027
41	Naoki Maeda	(Japan)	17 November 1994 (age 31)	(Japan) Urawa Red Diamonds	2025	2027
51	Mutsuki Kato	(Japan)	6 August 1997 (age 28)	(Japan) Cerezo Osaka	2023	
98	Valère Germain	(France)	17 April 1990 (age 36)	(Australia) Macarthur	2025	
Players who left on loan
11	Makoto Mitsuta	(Japan)	20 July 1999 (age 26)	(Japan) Ryutsu Keizai University	2022	
16	Takaaki Shichi	(Japan)	27 December 1993 (age 32)	(Japan) Avispa Fukuoka	2023	
20	Shion Inoue	(Japan)	3 August 1997 (age 28)	(Japan) Yokohama FC	2025	
27	Osamu Henry Iyoha	(Japan) (Nigeria)	23 June 1998 (age 28)	(Japan) Kyoto Sanga	2017	
40	Motoki Ohara	(Japan)	9 March 2000 (age 26)	(Japan) Mito HollyHock	2022	
Players who left permanently
5	Hiroya Matsumoto	(Japan)	10 August 2000 (age 25)	(Japan) Zweigen Kanazawa	2019	
22	Goro Kawanami	(Japan)	30 April 1991 (age 35)	(Japan) Vegalta Sendai	2021	

== Friendly ==
=== Pre-season ===
Win Draw Loss

4 February 2025 1	Vegalta Sendai (Japan)	0-2	(Japan) Sanfrecce Hiroshima	Miyazaki, Japan
				Stadium: Seagaire Square 1

=== Tour of Turkey (12-27 Jan) ===
15 January 2025 1	FC Pakhtakor Tashkent (Uzbekistan)	0-2	(Japan) Sanfrecce Hiroshima	Antalya, Turkey
			Yotaro Nakajima 22'; Ryo Germain 38'	Stadium: Sueno Sports Center

15 January 2025 1	PFC Ludogorets Razgrad (Bulgaria)	cancelled	(Japan) Sanfrecce Hiroshima	Antalya, Turkey

18 January 2025 2	FK Jablonec (Czech Republic)	1-1	(Japan) Sanfrecce Hiroshima	Antalya, Turkey
				Stadium: Ekodizayn Sports Center

20 January 2025 3	FC Zimbru Chișinău (Moldova)	1-5	(Japan) Sanfrecce Hiroshima	Antalya, Turkey
			Motoki Ohara 29'; Turgai Arslan 30'; Makoto Mitsuda 64'; Shion Inoue 75'; Yusuke Chajima 80'	Stadium: Titanik Resort Hotel Football Center

23 January 2025 4	CSKA 1948 (Bulgaria)	3-4	(Japan) Sanfrecce Hiroshima	Antalya, Turkey
				Stadium: Sueno Sports Center

24 January 2025 5	KS Cracovia (Poland)	1-2	(Japan) Sanfrecce Hiroshima	Antalya, Turkey
			Yotaro Nakajima 15'; Turgai Arslan 37'

=== In-season ===
Win Draw Loss

23 March 2025 1	Osaka University of Health and Sport Sciences (Japan)	0-3	(Japan) Sanfrecce Hiroshima	Akitakata, Japan
		Report	Valère Germain 28', 67'; Muneta Kaori 75'	Stadium: Akitakata Football Park

== Transfers ==
=== Pre-season ===
==== In ====
Transfers in

Position	Player	Transferred from	Fee
MF	(Japan) Satoshi Tanaka	(Japan) Shonan Bellmare	Undisclosed
MF	(Japan) Shion Inoue	(Japan) Yokohama FC	Undisclosed
FW	(Japan) Daiki Suga	(Japan) Hokkaido Consadole Sapporo	Free
FW	(Japan) (United States) Ryo Germain	(Japan) Júbilo Iwata	Undisclosed
FW	(France) Valère Germain	(Australia) Macarthur	Undisclosed
FW	(Japan) Naoki Maeda	(Japan) Urawa Red Diamonds	Undisclosed

Loan in

Position	Player	Transferred from	Fee
GK	(South Korea) Jeong Min-ki	(South Korea) Suwon FC	Season loan

Loan return (In)

Position	Player	Transferred from	Fee
DF	(Japan) (United States) Jelani Reshaun Sumiyoshi	(Japan) Shimizu S-Pulse	End of loan (Note: Jelani Reshaun Sumiyoshi move to Shimizu S-Pulse permanently after his contract ended.)
MF	(Japan) Kodai Dohi	(Japan) FC Imabari	End of loan (Note: Kodai Dohi released after returning to the team as his contract ended)
MF	(Japan) Taishi Semba	(Japan) Thespa Gunma	End of loan
FW	(Japan) Ryo Tanada	(Japan) Iwaki FC	End of loan (Note: Gainare Tottori signed Ryo Tanada on loan for the new season.)
FW	(Japan) Shun Ayukawa	(Japan) Oita Trinita	End of loan (Note: Shun Ayukawa's loan to Oita Trinita was extended for another season.)

==== Out ====
Transfers out

Position	Player	Transferred to	Fee
DF	(Japan) (United States) Jelani Reshaun Sumiyoshi	(Japan) Shimizu S-Pulse	Free
MF	(Japan) Yoshifumi Kashiwa	(Japan) Ventforet Kofu	Free
MF	(Japan) Taishi Matsumoto	(Japan) Urawa Red Diamonds	¥100m
MF	(Japan) Kodai Dohi	(Japan) Gainare Tottori	Free
MF	(Japan) Toshihiro Aoyama	N.A.	Retired
MF	(Cyprus) Pieros Sotiriou	(Cyprus) APOEL FC	Free
FW	(Brazil) Ezequiel	(Brazil) Athletic Club	Free
FW	(Brazil) Douglas Vieira	N.A.	Retired
FW	(Portugal) Gonçalo Paciência	(Brazil) Recife	Free

Loan out

Position	Player	Transferred to	Fee
DF	(Japan) (Nigeria) Shota Kofie	(Japan) Iwaki FC	Season loan
DF	(Japan) Takaaki Shichi	(Japan) Avispa Fukuoka	Season loan
MF	(Japan) Kohei Hosoya	(Japan) Ehime FC	Season loan
MF	(Japan) Taishi Semba	(Japan) Mito Hollyhock	Season loan
FW	(Japan) Ryo Tanada	(Japan) Gainare Tottori	Season loan
FW	(Japan) Shun Ayukawa	(Japan) Oita Trinita	Season loan
FW	(Japan) Makoto Mitsuta	(Japan) Gamba Osaka	Loan till 31 Jan 2026

Loan return (out)

Position	Player	Transferred to	Fee
GK	(Japan) Haruto Usui	(Japan) Matsumoto Yamaga	End of loan

=== Mid-season ===
==== In ====
Transfers in

Position	Player	Transferred from	Fee
DF	(South Korea) Kim Ju-sung	(South Korea) FC Seoul	US$1 million
FW	(Japan) Kosuke Kinoshita	(Japan) Kashiwa Reysol	Undisclosed

Loan in

Position	Player	Transferred from	Fee

Loan return

Position	Player	Transferred from	Fee

==== Out ====
Transfers out

Position	Player	Transferred to	Fee
GK	(Japan) Goro Kawanami	(Japan) Fagiano Okayama	Free
MF	(Japan) Hiroya Matsumoto	(Japan) Shonan Bellmare	Free

Loan out

Position	Player	Transferred from	Fee
DF	(Japan) (Nigeria) Osamu Henry Iyoha	(Japan) RB Omiya Ardija (J2)	Season loan
MF	(Japan) Motoki Ohara	(Japan) Albirex Niigata	Season loan
FW	(Japan) Shion Inoue	(Japan) Júbilo Iwata	Season loan

== Competitions ==
=== J1 League ===
Pos	Team	Pld	W	D	L	GF	GA	GD	Pts	Qualification or relegation
2	Kashiwa Reysol	38	21	12	5	60	34	+26	75	Qualification for the AFC Champions League Elite league stage
3	Kyoto Sanga	38	19	11	8	62	40	+22	68	Qualification for the AFC Champions League Elite league stage
4	Sanfrecce Hiroshima	38	20	8	10	46	28	+18	68	
5	Vissel Kobe	38	18	10	10	46	33	+13	64	Qualification for the AFC Champions League Elite league stage (Note: Qualified as the finalists of the J1 100 Year Vision League.)
6	Machida Zelvia	38	17	9	12	52	38	+14	60	Qualification for the AFC Champions League Two group stage (Note: Qualified as the 2025 Emperor's Cup winners.)

Source: JLeague.co, JLeague.jp, J.League Data Site
Rules for classification: 1) Points; 2) Goal difference; 3) Goals scored; 4) Head-to-head points; 5) Head-to-head goal difference; 6) Head-to-head goals scored; 7) Fewer disciplinary points.

==== Matches ====
16 February 1	Machida Zelvia	1–2	Sanfrecce Hiroshima	Tokyo
	Yuki Soma 26'; Oh Se-hun (yellow card) 58'; Takuma Nishimura (yellow card) 79'	Report	Tolgay Arslan 59' (yellow card) 48'; Sota Nakamura 77'	Stadium: Japan National Stadium; Attendance: 12,773; Referee: Yudai Yamamoto

23 February 2	Sanfrecce Hiroshima	1–0	Yokohama F. Marinos	Hiroshima
	Ryo Germain 49' (pen.); Hayao Kawabe (yellow card) 90+5'	Report	Steve Walsh (yellow card) 11'; Jean Claude (yellow card) 19'	Stadium: Edion Peace Wing Hiroshima; Attendance: 27,123; Referee: Ryo Tanimoto

26 February 3	Shimizu S-Pulse	1–1	Sanfrecce Hiroshima	Shizuoka
	Hayato Araki 12' (o.g.); Sen Takagi (yellow card) 38'	Report	Tsukasa Shiotani 65'; Sho Sasaki (yellow card) 13'; Tolgay Arslan (yellow card) 50'; Ryo Germain (yellow card) 78'	Stadium: IAI Stadium Nihondaira; Attendance: 12,238; Referee: Akihiko Ikeuchi

2 March 4	Sanfrecce Hiroshima	1–0	Yokohama FC	Hiroshima
	Sota Nakamura 78'	Report		Stadium: Edion Peace Wing Hiroshima; Attendance: 25,043; Referee: Hayato Shimizu

16 March 6	Sanfrecce Hiroshima	1–1	Kashiwa Reysol	Hiroshima
	Shunki Higashi 72'; Sho Sasaki (yellow card) 66'	Report	Mao Hosoya 86'; Yoshio Koizumi (yellow card) 45+3'; Riki Harakawa (yellow card) 83'	Stadium: Edion Peace Wing Hiroshima; Attendance: 25,283; Referee: Koki Nagamine

29 March 7	Kyoto Sanga	1–0	Sanfrecce Hiroshima	Kyoto
	Rafael Elias 60'	Report		Stadium: Sanga Stadium by Kyocera; Attendance: 14,393; Referee: Yoshimi Yamashita

2 April 8	Sanfrecce Hiroshima	1–0	Kashima Antlers	Hiroshima
	Naoki Maeda 22' (yellow card) 45+3'	Report	Léo Ceará (yellow card) 37'	Stadium: Edion Peace Wing Hiroshima; Attendance: 24,868; Referee: Hiroki Kasahara

6 April 9	Sanfrecce Hiroshima	2–1	Cerezo Osaka	Hiroshima
	Naoto Arai 18'; Hayato Araki 86'; Sho Sasaki (yellow card) 8'; Daiki Suga (yellow card) 57'; Shuto Nakano (yellow card) 80'	Report	Lucas Fernandes 15'; Rafael Ratao (yellow card) 22'	Stadium: Edion Peace Wing Hiroshima; Attendance: 25,324; Referee: Yoshiro Imamura

12 April 10	Sanfrecce Hiroshima	0–1	Fagiano Okayama	Hiroshima
	Serhat Umar (yellow card) 76'; Hayao Kawabe (yellow card) 90'	Report	Ryunosuke Sato 58'	Stadium: Edion Peace Wing Hiroshima; Attendance: 26,135; Referee: Koji Takasaki

20 April 11	Nagoya Grampus	2–1	Sanfrecce Hiroshima	Toyota
	Mateus Castro 40', 48' (yellow card) 41'; Kensuke Nagai (yellow card) 70'	Report	Daiki Suga 81'; Shuto Nakano (yellow card) 64'	Stadium: Toyota Stadium; Attendance: 29,072; Referee: Takuto Okabe

25 April 12	Urawa Red Diamonds	1–0	Sanfrecce Hiroshima	Saitama
	Takuro Kaneko 57'	Report	Shuto Nakano (yellow card) 67'	Stadium: Saitama Stadium 2002; Attendance: 28,555; Referee: Hiroyuki Kimura

29 April 13	Sanfrecce Hiroshima	0–1	Albirex Niigata	Hiroshima
		Report	Miguel Silveira 85' (yellow card) 90'	Stadium: Edion Peace Wing Hiroshima; Attendance: 25,246; Referee: Shu Kawamata

3 May 14	Sanfrecce Hiroshima	2–1	Avispa Fukuoka	Hiroshima
	Mutsuki Kato 67'; Ryo Germain 90+6' (pen.); Hayao Kawabe (yellow card) 23'; Daiki Suga (yellow card) 81'	Report	Tomoya Miki 86' (pen.); Wellington (yellow card) 47'	Stadium: Edion Peace Wing Hiroshima; Attendance: 25,631; Referee: Koki Nagamine

7 May 15	Shonan Bellmare	0–1	Sanfrecce Hiroshima	Hiratsuka
	Kim Min-tae (yellow card) 5'	Report	Ryo Germain 6' (pen.)	Stadium: Lemon Gas Stadium Hiratsuka; Attendance: 8,871; Referee: Yudai Yamamoto

11 May 16	Gamba Osaka	0–1	Sanfrecce Hiroshima	Osaka
	Tokuma Suzuki (red card) 22'	Report	Tsukasa Shiotani 33' (yellow card) 57'	Stadium: Suita City Football Stadium; Attendance: 30,633; Referee: Koichiro Fukushima

17 May 17	Sanfrecce Hiroshima	2–1	Tokyo Verdy	Hiroshima
	Valère Germain 87'; Hayao Kawabe 89'	Report	Yudai Kimura 77'; Yuan Matsuhashi (yellow card) 63'	Stadium: Edion Peace Wing Hiroshima; Attendance: 24,837; Referee: Takafumi Mikuriya

25 May 18	FC Tokyo	0–3	Sanfrecce Hiroshima	Chōfu
	Kei Koizumi (yellow card) 85'	Report	Hayato Araki 49'; Ryo Germain 59'; Hayao Kawabe 88'; Tsukasa Shiotani (yellow card) 23'	Stadium: Ajinomoto Stadium; Attendance: 46,206; Referee: Florian Badstübner (Germany)

31 May 19	Sanfrecce Hiroshima	1–2	Kawasaki Frontale	Hiroshima
	Hayato Araki 86'; Naoki Maeda (yellow card) 90+4'	Report	Marcinho 50'; Asahi Sasaki 90+1'; Akihiro Ienaga (yellow card) 75'; Yusuke Segawa (yellow card) 84'	Stadium: Edion Peace Wing Hiroshima; Attendance: 25,909; Referee: Martin Petersen (Germany)

14 June 20	Kashima Antlers	1–1	Sanfrecce Hiroshima	Tokyo
	Léo Ceará 90+2' (yellow card) 83'; Hitoshi Sogohata (yellow card) 8'; Kento Misao (yellow card) 56'	Report	Shunki Higashi 19'; Ryo Germain (yellow card) 45+3'; Kosuke Kinoshita (yellow card) 59'	Stadium: Japan National Stadium; Attendance: 22,725; Referee: Ryo Tanimoto

22 June 21	Yokohama FC	0–4	Sanfrecce Hiroshima	Yokohama
	Yuri Lara (yellow card) 2'; Boniface Nduka (yellow card) 14'	Report	Kosuke Kinoshita 17', 75'; Mutsuki Kato 23' (yellow card) 45+2'; Naoto Arai 40'; Shunki Higashi 72'	Stadium: Mitsuzawa Stadium; Attendance: 10,475; Referee: Yusuke Araki

28 June 22	Sanfrecce Hiroshima	1–2	Nagoya Grampus	Hiroshima
	Naoto Arai 90'; Sota Nakamura (yellow card) 32'; Shunki Higashi (yellow card) 46'	Report	Mateus Castro 21', 40'; Yuki Nogami (yellow card) 44'; Tsukasa Morishima (yellow card) 50'; Alexandre Pisano (yellow card) 81'	Stadium: Edion Peace Wing Hiroshima; Attendance: 26,246; Referee: Hiroki Kasahara

2 July 5 (Rescheduled)	Vissel Kobe	1–0	Sanfrecce Hiroshima	Kobe
	Erik 66'	Report	Yotaro Nakajima (yellow card) 21'	Stadium: Noevir Stadium Kobe; Attendance: 14,950; Referee: Koei Koya

5 July 23	Fagiano Okayama	0–1	Sanfrecce Hiroshima	Okayama
	Ataru Esaka (yellow card) 65'; Yugo Tatsuta (yellow card) 90+7'	Report	Sota Nakamura 90+7'	Stadium: City Light Stadium; Attendance: 15,451; Referee: Hayato Shimizu

20 July 24	Albirex Niigata	0–2	Sanfrecce Hiroshima	Niigata
	Michael Fitzgerald (yellow card) 69'; Kazuhiko Chiba (yellow card) 81'	Report	Shunki Higashi 2'; Kosuke Kinoshita 48'	Stadium: Denka Big Swan Stadium; Attendance: 22,178; Referee: Yoshiro Imamura

10 August 25	Sanfrecce Hiroshima	0–0	Shimizu S-Pulse	Hiroshima
	Yoshifumi Matsuo (yellow card) 44'	Report	Kai Matsuzaki (yellow card) 41'; Capixaba (yellow card) 64'	Stadium: Edion Peace Wing Hiroshima; Attendance: 23,969; Referee: Iván Barton (El Salvador)

16 August 26	Sanfrecce Hiroshima	1–0	Gamba Osaka	Hiroshima
	Sota Nakamura 17'	Report	Ryoya Yamashita (yellow card) 11'; Issam Jebali (yellow card) 23'; Genta Miura (yellow card) 39'; Shuto Abe (red card) 60'; Kanji Okunuki (yellow card) 90+3'	Stadium: Edion Peace Wing Hiroshima; Attendance: 25,925; Referee: Takafumi Mikuriya

23 August 27	Tokyo Verdy	0–3	Sanfrecce Hiroshima	Chōfu
	Itsuki Someno (yellow card) 11'; Hiroto Taniguchi (yellow card) 28'; Rei Hirakawa (yellow card) 81'	Report	Shuto Nakano 6'; Sota Nakamura 62'; Naoto Arai 82'	Stadium: Ajinomoto Stadium; Attendance: 17,480; Referee: Akihiko Ikeuchi

31 August 28	Cerezo Osaka	1–1	Sanfrecce Hiroshima	Osaka
	Lucas Fernandes 35'; Kyohei Yoshino (yellow card) 58'	Report	Kosuke Kinoshita 72'; Ryo Germain (yellow card) 72'; Yotaro Nakajima (yellow card) 83'	Stadium: Yodoko Sakura Stadium; Attendance: 19,899; Referee: Masuya Ueda

12 September 29 (Rescheduled)	Sanfrecce Hiroshima	1–1	Kyoto Sanga	Hiroshima
	Sho Sasaki 63'	Report	Rafael Elias 88' (yellow card) 67'; Marco Túlio (yellow card) 87'; Gakuji Ota (yellow card) 90+4'	Stadium: Edion Peace Wing Hiroshima; Attendance: 25,369; Referee: Hiroyuki Kimura

20 August 30	Sanfrecce Hiroshima	0–1	Vissel Kobe	Hiroshima
	Sho Sasaki (red card) 57'	Report	Kim Ju-sung 87' (o.g.)	Stadium: Edion Peace Wing Hiroshima; Attendance: 24,847; Referee: Yusuke Araki

23 September 31	Kashiwa Reysol	0–0	Sanfrecce Hiroshima	Chiba
	Yuto Yamada (yellow card) 44'	Report	Ryo Germain (yellow card) 67'; Michael Skibbe (yellow card) 69'	Stadium: Sankyo Frontier Kashiwa Stadium; Attendance: 13,552; Referee: Ahmed El Shrief (Qatar)

27 September 32	Avispa Fukuoka	1–2	Sanfrecce Hiroshima	Fukuoka
	Abdul Hanan Sani Brown 90+2'	Report	Valère Germain 17'; Satoshi Tanaka 87'	Stadium: Best Denki Stadium; Attendance: 11,472; Referee: Hayato Shimizu

4 October 33	Sanfrecce Hiroshima	2–1	Machida Zelvia	Hiroshima
	Kim Ju-sung 88' (yellow card) 88'; Tolgay Arslan 90+5' (pen.) (yellow card) 90+5'; Michael Skibbe (yellow card) 66'	Report	Yuki Soma 50'; Takuma Nishimura (yellow card) 29'	Stadium: Edion Peace Wing Hiroshima; Attendance: 25,877; Referee: Hiroki Kasahara

17 October 34	Sanfrecce Hiroshima	0–0	FC Tokyo	Hiroshima
		Report	Keigo Higashi (yellow card) 15'; Alexander Scholz (yellow card) 45+2'; Masato Morishige (yellow card) 67'; Yūto Nagatomo (yellow card) 70'	Stadium: Edion Peace Wing Hiroshima; Attendance: 25,728; Referee: Akihiko Ikeuchi

25 October 35	Yokohama F. Marinos	3–0	Sanfrecce Hiroshima	Yokohama
	Asahi Uenaka 12'; Jun Amano 86'; Jeison Quiñónes 90+1' (yellow card) 72'; Yuri (yellow card) 80'; Toichi Suzuki (yellow card) 87'	Report		Stadium: Nissan Stadium; Attendance: Jumpei Iida; Referee: 27,356

8 November 36	Sanfrecce Hiroshima	3–0	Urawa Red Diamonds	Hiroshima
	Kosuke Kinoshita 43'; Mutsuki Kato 75'; Naoki Maeda 83'	Report		Stadium: Edion Peace Wing Hiroshima; Attendance: 26,383; Referee: Ryo Tanimoto

30 November 37	Kawasaki Frontale	1–2	Sanfrecce Hiroshima	Kawasaki
	Tatsuya Ito 12' (yellow card) 33'; So Kawahara (yellow card) 72'; Jesiel (yellow card) 84'	Report	Hayao Kawabe 45+4'; Sota Nakamura 56'; Sota Koshimichi (yellow card) 23'	Stadium: Kawasaki Todoroki Stadium; Attendance: 23,173; Referee: Koji Takasaki

6 December 38	Sanfrecce Hiroshima	2–1	Shonan Bellmare	Hiroshima
	Valère Germain 87'; Kosuke Kinoshita 90+1' (pen.); Ryo Germain (yellow card) 33'	Report	Hayao Kawabe 78' (o.g.)	Stadium: Edion Peace Wing Hiroshima; Attendance: 26,373; Referee: Akihiko Ikeuchi

=== J.League Cup ===
4 June Play-off round first leg	Avispa Fukuoka	1–0	Sanfrecce Hiroshima	Fukuoka
	Wellington 55'; Yuma Obata (yellow card) 90+3'	Report	Valère Germain (yellow card) 18'; Naoto Arai (yellow card) 55'; Serhat Umar (yellow card) 63'; Hayao Kawabe (yellow card) 90'	Stadium: Best Denki Stadium; Attendance: 3,670; Referee: Masuya Ueda

8 June Play-off round second leg	Sanfrecce Hiroshima	2–1 (a.e.t.) (4–3 p)	Avispa Fukuoka	Hiroshima
	Shuto Nakano 31'; Sota Nakamura 64'; Sho Sasaki (yellow card) 86'; Mutsuki Kato (red card) 89'; Valère Germain (yellow card) 108'	Report	Wellington 72' (yellow card) 58'; Masato Shigemi (yellow card) 85' (yellow-red card) 106'; Takumi Kamijima (yellow card) 90+3'	Stadium: Edion Peace Wing Hiroshima; Attendance: 20,676; Referee: Yudai Yamamoto
	Penalties
	Valère Germain (penalty missed); Shunki Higashi (penalty scored); Narcos Junior (penalty scored); Ryo Germain (penalty scored); Shuto Nakano (penalty scored)		(penalty scored) Yuki Kitajima; (penalty scored) Takeshi Kanamori; (penalty missed) Tomoya Ando; (penalty scored) Takumi Kamijima; (penalty missed) Wellington

3 September Quarter Final first leg	Shonan Bellmare	3–2	Sanfrecce Hiroshima	Hiratsuka
	Akito Suzuki 41'; Hiroaki Okuno 49'; Rio Nitta 90+2'; Ze Ricardo (yellow card) 68'; Shun Yoshida (yellow card) 90+4'	Report	Mutsuki Kato 15'; Kosuke Kinoshita 85'; Tsukasa Shiotani (yellow card) 40'; Shunki Higashi (yellow card) 70'	Stadium: Lemon Gas Stadium Hiratsuka; Attendance: 6,309; Referee: Jumpei Ilda

7 September Quarter Final second leg	Sanfrecce Hiroshima	4–1 (6–4 agg.)	Shonan Bellmare	Hiroshima
	Mutsuki Kato 23'; Ryo Germain 61'; Valère Germain 90+4'; Shuto Nakano 90+8'	Report	Akito Suzuki 37'; Hiroya Matsumoto (yellow card) 13'	Stadium: Edion Peace Wing Hiroshima; Attendance: 23,694; Referee: Koichiro Fukushima

8 October Semi Final first leg	Yokohama FC	0–2	Sanfrecce Hiroshima	Yokohama
	Ryo Kubota (yellow card) 23'; Koki Kumakura (yellow card) 35'; Yoshifumi Matsuo (yellow card) 75'	Report	Yotaro Nakajima 33'; Shuto Nakano 83'; Hayao Kawabe (yellow card) 18'	Stadium: NHK Spring Mitsuzawa Football Stadium; Attendance: 8,641; Referee: Koji Takasaki

12 October Semi Final second leg	Sanfrecce Hiroshima	2–1 (4–1 agg.)	Yokohama FC	Hiroshima
	Towa Yamane 17'; Hinata Ogura (yellow card) 28'; Ryo Tadokoro (yellow card) 68'; Joao Paulo (yellow card) 69'	Report	Valère Germain 11'; Ryo Germain 75'	Stadium: Edion Peace Wing Hiroshima; Attendance: 26,192; Referee: Hiroyuki Kimura

1 November Final	Kashiwa Reysol	1–3	Sanfrecce Hiroshima	Tokyo
	Mao Hosoya 81'	Report	Hayato Araki 25'; Shunki Higashi 38'; Ryo Germain 45+2'; Tsukasa Shiotani (yellow card) 45+1'	Stadium: Japan National Stadium; Attendance: 62,466; Referee: Takafumi Mikuriya

=== Emperor's Cup ===
11 June Second round	Sanfrecce Hiroshima	3–1	Brew Saga (J5)	Hiroshima
	Marcos Junior 4', 33'; Naoki Maeda 81'	Report	Kaito Kasuya 41'; Kazuki Higa (yellow card) 86'	Stadium: Edion Peace Wing Hiroshima; Attendance: 3,942; Referee: Futoshi Nakamura

16 July Third round	Sanfrecce Hiroshima	5–2	Fujieda MYFC (J2)	Hiroshima
	Mutsuki Kato 19' (yellow card) 32'; Naoki Maeda 38'; Sota Nakamura 55'; Shuto Nakano 67'; Kosuke Kinoshita 72' (pen.)	Report	Ren Asakura 15'; Valère Germain 44' (o.g.); Kyota Sakakibara (yellow card) 62'	Stadium: Edion Peace Wing Hiroshima; Attendance: 1,822; Referee: Koichiro Fukushima

6 August Fourth round	Sanfrecce Hiroshima	3–0	Shimizu S-Pulse	Hiroshima
	Naoki Maeda 45+1' (yellow card) 20'; Sota Nakamura 59'; Kosuke Kinoshita 75'; Hayato Araki (yellow card) 73'	Report		Stadium: Edion Peace Wing Hiroshima; Attendance: 10,110; Referee: Takuto Okabe

27 August Quarter Final	Nagoya Grampus	2–4	Sanfrecce Hiroshima	Aichi
	Kensuke Nagai 54'; Yuya Yamagishi 82'; Keiya Shiihashi (yellow card) 36'	Report	Satoshi Tanaka 5', 19'; Yotaro Nakajima 42' (pen.); Shuto Nakano 48'; Sota Nakamura (yellow card) 53'; Hayato Araki (yellow card) 59'	Stadium: Toyota Stadium; Attendance: 7,638; Referee: Hiroki Kasahara

16 November Semi Final	Vissel Kobe	2–0	Sanfrecce Hiroshima	Osaka
	Katsuya Nagato 24'; Daiju Sasaki 69' (pen.); Matheus Thuler (yellow card) 6'	Report		Stadium: Suita City Football Stadium; Attendance: 17,861; Referee: Koei Koya

=== Super Cup ===
8 February	Vissel Kobe	0–2	Sanfrecce Hiroshima	Tokyo
13:35 JST	Tetsushi Yamakawa (yellow card) 58'; Mitsuki Saito (yellow card) 78'; Takuya Iwanami (yellow card) 87'	Report	Tolgay Arslan 12'; Hayato Araki 70'	Stadium: Japan National Stadium; Attendance: 53,343; Referee: Takafumi Mikuriya

=== AFC Champions League Two ===
==== Knockout stage ====
13 February 2025 R16 Leg 1	Nam Định (Vietnam)	0–3	(Japan) Sanfrecce Hiroshima	Nam Định, Vietnam
	Caio César (yellow card) 12'; Rômulo da Silva (yellow card) 33'	Report	Ryo Germain 73'; Satoshi Tanaka 88'; Sota Koshimichi 90+1'	Stadium: Thiên Trường Stadium; Attendance: 10,800; Referee: Casey Reibelt (Australia)

20 February 2025 R16 Leg 2	Sanfrecce Hiroshima (Japan)	4–0 (7–0 agg.)	(Vietnam) Nam Định	Hiroshima, Japan
	Sho Sasaki 10'; Sota Nakamura 53', 90+1'; Shuto Nakano 66'; Naoto Arai (yellow card) 71'	Report	China (yellow card) 47'	Stadium: Edion Peace Wing Hiroshima; Attendance: 9,471; Referee: Ko Hyung-jin (South Korea)

5 March 2025 QF Leg 1	Sanfrecce Hiroshima (Japan)	0–3; Awarded (Note: The Sanfrecce Hiroshima v Lion City Sailors first leg, originally won 6–1 by Sanfrecce Hiroshima, was forfeited and awarded 3–0 to Lion City Sailors by the AFC Disciplinary Committee on 8 March 2025, as Sanfrecce Hiroshima fielded Valère Germain, even though he was suspended.)	(Singapore) Lion City Sailors	Hiroshima, Japan
		Report		Stadium: Edion Peace Wing Hiroshima; Attendance: 6,812; Referee: Mooud Bonyadifard (Iran)

12 March 2025 QF Leg 2	Lion City Sailors (Singapore)	1–1 (4–1 agg.)	(Japan) Sanfrecce Hiroshima	Jalan Besar, Singapore
	Lennart Thy 20'; Bailey Wright (yellow card) 51'; Obren Kljajic (yellow card) 90+5'	Report	Yotaro Nakajima 34'; Ryo Germain (red card) 51'	Stadium: Jalan Besar Stadium; Attendance: 4,193; Referee: Ahmed Issa (United Arab Emirates)

=== AFC Champions League Elite ===
==== League stage ====
Win Draw Loss

16 September 2025 MD 1	Melbourne City (Australia)	0–2	(Japan) Sanfrecce Hiroshima	Melbourne, Australia
		Report	Marcos Júnior 53' (pen.); Yotaro Nakajima 81'; Shunki Higashi (yellow card) 34'; Kim Ju-sung (yellow card) 61'; Hayato Araki (yellow card) 62'	Stadium: Melbourne Rectangular Stadium; Attendance: 1,423; Referee: Payam Heydari (Iran)

30 September 2025 MD 2	Sanfrecce Hiroshima (Japan)	1–1	(China) Shanghai Port	Sanfrecce, Japan
	Hayato Araki 19'; Tsukasa Shiotani (yellow card) 16'; Kim Ju-sung (yellow card) 55'	Report	Gabrielzinho 83'; Alexander Jojo (yellow card) 77'; Gustavo (red card) 90'	Stadium: Edion Peace Wing Hiroshima; Attendance: 7,819; Referee: Alex King (Australia)

21 October 2025 MD 3	Ulsan HD FC (South Korea)	1–0	(Japan) Sanfrecce Hiroshima	Ulsan, South Korea
	Kim Min-hyeok 12'; Lee Jae-Ik (yellow card) 66'	Report	Tsukasa Shiotani (yellow card) 82'	Stadium: Ulsan Munsu Football Stadium; Attendance: 2,966; Referee: Majed Al-Shamrani (Saudi Arabia)

4 November 2025 MD 4	Sanfrecce Hiroshima (Japan)	1–0	(South Korea) Gangwon FC	Sanfrecce, Japan
	Mutsuki Kato 63'; Naoto Arai (yellow card) 22'; Sho Sasaki (yellow card) 61' (yellow-red card) 70'; Hayao Kawabe (yellow card) 90+6'; Michael Skibbe (yellow card) 90+7'	Report	Lee You-hyeon (yellow card) 66'; Marko Tući (yellow card) 69'	Stadium: Edion Peace Wing Hiroshima; Attendance: 8,924; Referee: Casey Reibelt (Australia)

25 November 2025 MD 5	Chengdu Rongcheng (China)	1–1	(Japan) Sanfrecce Hiroshima	Chengdu, China
	Felipe 53' (pen.); Timo Letschert (yellow card) 11'; Yan Dinghao (yellow card) 90+5'	Report	Mutsuki Kato 63'	Stadium: Phoenix Hill Football Stadium; Attendance: 27,836; Referee: Abdulla Ali Al Athba (Qatar)

10 December 2025 MD 6	Sanfrecce Hiroshima (Japan)	1–0	(China) Shanghai Shenhua	Sanfrecce, Japan
	Hayato Araki 78'; Ryo Germain (yellow card) 76'	Report	Shinichi Chan (yellow card) 16'; Wu Xi (yellow card) 68'; Ibrahim Amadou (yellow card) 70'	Stadium: Edion Peace Wing Hiroshima; Attendance: 13,240; Referee: Ahmad Al-Ali (Kuwait)

10 February 2026 MD 7	Sanfrecce Hiroshima (Japan)	2–1	(Malaysia) Johor Darul Ta'zim	Sanfrecce, Japan
	Akito Suzuki 18' (pen.), 48'; Sota Nakamura (yellow card) 38'; Taishi Matsumoto (yellow card) 44'; Shuto Nakano (yellow card) 90+4'	Report	Marcos Guilherme 3'; Jonathan Silva (red card) 16'; Hayao Kawabe (yellow card) 22'; Bergson (yellow card) 28'; João Figueiredo (yellow card) 38'; Nene (yellow card) 67'	Stadium: Edion Peace Wing Hiroshima; Attendance: 10,132; Referee: Ma Ning (China)

17 February 2026 MD 8	FC Seoul (South Korea)	–	(Japan) Sanfrecce Hiroshima	Seoul, South Korea
		Report		Stadium: Seoul World Cup Stadium

Pos	Team	Pld	W	D	L	GF	GA	GD	Pts	Qualification
1	(Japan) Machida Zelvia	8	5	2	1	15	7	+8	17	Advance to round of 16
2	(Japan) Vissel Kobe	8	5	1	2	14	7	+7	16	Advance to round of 16
3	(Japan) Sanfrecce Hiroshima	8	4	3	1	10	6	+4	15	Advance to round of 16
4	(Thailand) Buriram United	8	4	2	2	10	8	+2	14	Advance to round of 16
5	(Australia) Melbourne City	8	4	2	2	9	7	+2	14	Advance to round of 16

Source: AFC
Rules for classification: 1) points; 2) goal difference; 3) number of goals scored; 4) number of matches won; 5) penalty shoot-out if only two teams remain tied and played each other on the final matchday 6) fair play ranking; 7) drawing of lots

== Team statistics ==
=== Appearances and goals ===
As of 10 Dec 2025

No.	Pos.	Player	J1 League		Emperor's Cup		J.League Cup		Super Cup		2024–25 AFC Champions League Two (Note: The first leg of the match between Sanfrecce Hiroshima and Lion City Sailors are not counted in the stats as the match was forfeited by the AFC. Lion City Sailors were awarded a 0–3 victory after Sanfrecce Hiroshima fielded an ineligible player. The score on the field was originally a 6–1 win by Sanfrecce Hiroshima.)		2025–26 AFC Champions League Elite		Total	
No.	Pos.	Player	Apps	Goals	Apps	Goals	Apps	Goals	Apps	Goals	Apps	Goals	Apps	Goals	Apps	Goals
1	GK	(Japan) Keisuke Osako	38	0	3	0	0	0	1	0	3	0	5	0	51	0
3	DF	(Japan) Taichi Yamasaki	3+3	0	1+1	0	3+1	0	0	0	1+1	0	1	0	14	0
4	DF	(Japan) Hayato Araki	35+2	3	2+1	0	5	1	1	1	2+1	0	6	2	55	7
6	MF	(Japan) Hayao Kawabe	35+2	3	3	0	6	0	0+1	0	2+1	0	5	0	55	3
9	FW	(Japan) (United States) Ryo Germain	35+1	4	3	0	4+2	3	1	0	3	1	2+1	0	52	8
10	MF	(Brazil) Marcos Júnior	0+4	0	1	2	0+3	0	0	0	0	0	2	1	9	3
13	DF	(Japan) Naoto Arai	16+11	4	3	0	3+1	0	0+1	0	1+2	0	4+1	0	43	4
14	MF	(Japan) Satoshi Tanaka	25+3	1	3+2	2	5	0	1	0	4	1	5	0	48	4
15	DF	(Japan) Shuto Nakano	30+7	1	4	2	6+1	3	1	0	2	1	4+1	0	56	7
17	FW	(Japan) Kosuke Kinoshita	9+11	6	2+4	2	1+2	1	0	0	0	0	4+2	0	35	8
18	MF	(Japan) Daiki Suga	7+15	1	1+1	0	3+1	0	0+1	0	1+2	0	2+3	0	37	1
19	DF	(Japan) Sho Sasaki	36+1	1	4	0	7	0	1	0	3	1	4	0	56	2
21	GK	(Japan) Yudai Tanaka	0	0	1	0	0	0	0	0	0	0	0	0	1	0
24	MF	(Japan) Shunki Higashi	24+11	3	4+1	0	4+2	1	1	0	2	0	2+1	0	52	4
25	DF	(Japan) Yusuke Chajima	0+1	0	0	0	0+1	0	0	0	0	0	0	0	2	0
26	GK	(South Korea) Jeong Min-ki	0	0	1	0	6	0	0	0	0	0	1	0	8	0
30	MF	(Germany) (Turkey) Tolgay Arslan	6+3	2	0+1	0	0+3	0	1	1	1	0	2+2	0	19	3
32	MF	(Japan) Sota Koshimichi	4+15	0	1+1	0	0+2	0	0+1	0	0+3	1	0+1	0	28	1
33	MF	(Japan) Tsukasa Shiotani	32+4	2	4	0	6	0	1	0	2	0	5+1	0	55	2
35	MF	(Japan) Yotaro Nakajima	8+8	0	2+1	1	3+1	1	1	0	1	1	1+1	1	27	4
36	FW	(Japan) Aren Inoue	0+1	0	0	0	0	0	0	0	0	0	0	0	1	0
37	DF	(South Korea) Kim Ju-sung	7+1	1	0+1	0	0	0	0	0	0	0	3	0	12	1
39	MF	(Japan) Sota Nakamura	21+11	6	3+2	2	2+3	1	0+1	0	2+1	2	3+1	0	50	11
41	FW	(Japan) Naoki Maeda	12+15	2	2+3	3	4+1	0	0	0	0	0	3+2	0	42	5
44	MF	(Japan) Taishi Semba	0	0	1+1	0	0	0	0	0	0	0	0	0	2	0
45	MF	(Japan) Shimon Kobayashi	0+1	0	0	0	0	0	0	0	0	0	0+1	0	2	0
51	FW	(Japan) Mutsuki Kato	24+11	3	2+1	1	4+3	2	1	0	3	0	1+5	2	55	8
98	FW	(France) Valère Germain	11+13	3	2+3	0	4+3	2	0	0	0	0	1+3	0	40	5
Players featured on a match for the team, but left the club mid-season, on loan transfer
5	MF	(Japan) Hiroya Matsumoto	0+4	0	0+1	0	1	0	0	0	0+1	0	0	0	7	0
16	DF	(Japan) Takaaki Shichi	0	0	0	0	0	0	0	0	0	0	0	0	0	0
20	FW	(Japan) Shion Inoue	3+1	0	1	0	0	0	0	0	0+1	0	0	0	6	0
27	DF	(Japan) (Nigeria) Osamu Henry Iyoha	0	0	0	0	0	0	0	0	0	0	0	0	0	0
40	MF	(Japan) Motoki Ohara	0+2	0	1	0	0	0	0	0	0+1	0	0	0	4	0
Players featured on a match for the team, but left the club mid-season permanently
11	FW	(Japan) Makoto Mitsuta	0	0	0	0	0	0	0	0	0+1	0	0	0	1	0
22	GK	(Japan) Goro Kawanami	0	0	0	0	0	0	0	0	0	0	0	0	0	0
