= 2026–27 Sanfrecce Hiroshima season =

Sanfrecce Hiroshima
2026–27 season
- Manager: (Germany) Bartosch Gaul
- Stadium: Edion Peace Wing Hiroshima
Home colours	Away colours

The 2026–27 season is the 92nd season in the history of Sanfrecce Hiroshima.

== Squad ==
=== Season squad ===
Squad no.	Name	Nationality	Date of birth	Last Club	Contract Since	Contract Till
Goalkeepers
1	Keisuke Ōsako	(Japan)	28 July 1999 (age 27)	Youth Team	2018	2026
21	Yudai Tanaka	(Japan)	17 November 1995 (age 31)	(Japan) Blaublitz Akita	2023	
43	Hikaru Ogawa	(Japan)	24 June 2007 (age 19)	Youth Team		
99	Ouchi Issei	(Japan) (Italy)	8 September 2000 (age 26)	(Japan) Matsumoto Yamaga	2026	2027
Defenders
3	Taichi Yamasaki	(Japan)	8 January 2001 (age 25)	(Japan) Juntendo University	2023	2026
4	Hayato Araki	(Japan)	7 August 1996 (age 30)	(Japan) Kansai University	2019	
5	Naoto Arai	(Japan)	7 October 1996 (age 30)	(Japan) Albirex Niigata	2024	2027
15	Shuto Nakano	(Japan)	27 June 2000 (age 26)	(Japan) Toin University	2022	2027
19	Sho Sasaki	(Japan)	2 October 1989 (age 37)	(Japan) Ventforet Kofu	2015	2026
33	Tsukasa Shiotani	(Japan)	5 December 1988 (age 37)	(Japan) Mito HollyHock	2012	
37	Kim Ju-sung	(South Korea)	12 December 2000 (age 25)	(South Korea) FC Seoul	2025	2027
Midfielders
6	Hayao Kawabe	(Japan)	8 September 1995 (age 31)	(Belgium) Standard Liège	2024	2027
7	Shunki Higashi	(Japan)	28 July 2000 (age 26)	Youth Team	2018	2027
8	Takumu Kawamura	(Japan)	28 August 1999 (age 27)	(Austria) Red Bull Salzburg	2026	2027
14	Yasushi Matsumoto	(Japan)	22 August 1998 (age 28)	(Japan) Urawa Red Diamonds	2026	
32	Sota Koshimichi	(Japan)	3 April 2004 (age 22)	Youth Team	2022	2026
35	Yotaro Nakajima	(Japan)	22 April 2006 (age 20)	Youth Team	2025	2028
45	Shimon Kobayashi	(Japan)	23 January 2008 (age 18)	Youth Team	2025	2028
46	Rento Noguchi	(Japan)	20 April 2008 (age 18)	Youth Team	2026	2027
Strikers
9	Kusini Yengi	(Australia) (South Sudan) (England)	15 January 1999 (age 27)	(Scotland) Aberdeen	2026	
10	Akito Suzuki	(Japan)	30 July 2003 (age 23)	(Japan) Shonan Bellmare	2025	
11	Mutsuki Kato	(Japan)	6 August 1997 (age 29)	(Japan) Cerezo Osaka	2023	
18	Daiki Suga	(Japan)	10 September 1998 (age 28)	(Japan) Hokkaido Consadole Sapporo	2025	
22	Sébastien Haller	(Ivory Coast) (France)	22 June 1994 (age 32)	(Netherlands) FC Utrecht	2026	2027
23	Shun Ayukawa	(Japan)	15 September 2001 (age 25)	(Japan) Oita Trinita	2025	
29	Takuma Asano	(Japan)	10 November 1994 (age 32)	(Spain) RCD Mallorca	2026	
41	Naoki Maeda	(Japan)	17 November 1994 (age 32)	(Japan) Urawa Red Diamonds	2025	2027
Players who left on loan
27	Osamu Henry Iyoha	(Japan) (Nigeria)	23 June 1998 (age 28)	(Japan) RB Omiya Ardija	2017	
36	Aren Inoue	(Japan)	19 September 2006 (age 20)	(Japan) Matsumoto Yamaga	2025	2027
38	Cailen Hill	(Japan) (Australia)	9 July 2002 (age 24)	(Japan) Waseda University	2025	2027
39	Sota Nakamura	(Japan)	15 October 2002 (age 24)	(Japan) Meiji University	2025	2027
40	Motoki Ohara	(Japan)	9 March 2000 (age 26)	(Japan) Albirex Niigata	2022	
	Kohei Hosoya	(Japan)	11 December 2001 (age 24)	(Japan) Ehime FC	2025	
Players who left permanently
16	Takaaki Shichi	(Japan)	27 December 1993 (age 32)	(Japan) Avispa Fukuoka	2023	

== Club officials ==
Club officials for 2026.

Position	Name
Manager	(Germany) Bartosz Gaul
Assistant manager	(Germany) Arne Janssen (Japan) Shin Nakamura (Japan) Toshihiro Aoyama
Goalkeeper coach	(Japan) Naoto Kono (Japan) Takuto Hayashi
Physical coach	(Japan) Hiroshi Sato
High performance coach	(Japan) Mineichi Isobe
Analyst	(Japan) Masaru Mikado

== Friendly ==
=== Tour of Austria (7-19 July) ===
Win Draw Loss

11 July 1	Sanfrecce Hiroshima (Japan)	1–5	(Austria) SK Sturm Graz	Stuben
	Naoto Arai 57'	Report	15'; 18'; 105'; 106'; 112'	Stadium: Sportsplatz Stuben Field

14 July 2	Sanfrecce Hiroshima (Japan)	3–1	(Croatia) NK Slaven Berpo	Stuben
	Takuma Asano 24'; Hayao Kawabe 37'; Rikuji Kato 63'	Report	15'	Stadium: Kreutherdorfstadion Seehau

18 July 3	Sanfrecce Hiroshima (Japan)	2–1	(Germany) 1. FC Köln U21	Geisbockheim
	Shimon Kobayashi 17'; Yotaro Nakajima 52'	Report		Stadium: Franz-Kremer-Stadion

=== Tour of Miyazaki (26 July - 2 Aug) ===
28 July 4	Sanfrecce Hiroshima (Japan)	4–0	(Japan) Verspah Oita	Miyazaki
	Yotaro Nakajima 59'; Sebastian Haller 62'; Rikuji Kato 65', 73'	Report		Stadium: Amino Vital Training Center

1 August 5	Sanfrecce Hiroshima (Japan)	3–1	(Japan) Tegevajaro Miyazaki	Miyazaki
		Report		Stadium: Ichigo Miyazaki Shintomi Soccer Field

== Transfers ==
=== In ===
Pre-season

Date	Position	Player	Transferred from	Ref
Permanent Transfer
31 May 2026	MF	(Japan) Kohei Hosoya	(Japan) Ehime FC	End of loan
31 May 2026	DF	(Japan) (Nigeria) Shota Kofie Kobuki	(Japan) Iwaki FC	End of loan
31 May 2026	FW	(Japan) Aren Inoue	(Japan) Matsumoto Yamaga	End of loan
31 May 2026	DF	(Japan) (Nigeria) Osamu Henry Iyoha	(Japan) RB Omiya Ardija (J2)	End of loan
31 May 2026	MF	(Japan) Taishi Semba	(Japan) Mito Hollyhock	End of loan
28 June 2026	FW	(Japan) Takuma Asano	(Spain) RCD Mallorca	Free
6 July 2026	FW	(Ivory Coast) (France) Sébastien Haller	(Netherlands) FC Utrecht	Free
25 July 2026	MF	(Japan) Takumu Kawamura	(Austria) Red Bull Salzburg	Free
7 September 2026	DF	(Japan) Takaaki Shichi	(Japan) Kyoto Sanga	Undisclosed
Loan Transfer
31 August 2026	MF	(Australia) (South Sudan) (England) Kusini Yengi	(Scotland) Aberdeen	Season loan

=== Out ===
Pre-season

Date	Position	Player	Transferred to	Ref
Permanent Transfer
27 May 2026	MF	(Japan) Yusuke Chajima	Retired	N.A.
27 May 2026	MF	(Germany) (Turkey) Tolgay Arslan	Retired	N.A.
12 June 2026	FW	(Japan) Ryo Germain	(Japan) Shimizu S-Pulse	Undisclosed
26 June 2026	FW	(Japan) Kosuke Kinoshita	(Japan) Shimizu S-Pulse	Free
26 June 2026	MF	(Japan) Taishi Semba	(Japan) Mito Hollyhock	Free
August 2026	MF	(Japan) Shunki Higashi	(Japan) Machida Zelvia	Undisclosed
Loan Transfer
21 June 2026	DF	(Japan) (Nigeria) Osamu Henry Iyoha	(Japan) RB Omiya Ardija (J2)	Season loan
21 June 2026	FW	(Japan) Aren Inoue	(Japan) Matsumoto Yamaga	Season loan
25 June 2026	GK	(Japan) (Australia) Cailen Hill	(Japan) Blaublitz Akita	Season loan
25 June 2026	DF	(Japan) (Nigeria) Shota Kofie Kobuki	(Japan) Iwaki FC	Season loan
25 June 2026	MF	(Japan) Kohei Hosoya	(Japan) Ehime FC	Season loan
25 June 2026	MF	(Japan) Motoki Ohara	(Japan) Jubilo Iwata	Season loan
17 July 2026	FW	(Japan) Sota Nakamura	(France) Le Havre AC	Season loan

== Competitions ==
=== J1 League ===
Pos	Team	Pld	W	D	L	GF	GA	GD	Pts	Qualification or relegation
1	FC Tokyo	14	10	3	1	33	8	+25	33	Qualification for the AFC Champions League Elite league stage
2	Kashiwa Reysol	14	10	1	3	31	20	+11	31	Qualification for the AFC Champions League Elite league stage
3	Sanfrecce Hiroshima	14	9	3	2	32	10	+22	30	Qualification for the AFC Champions League Elite league stage
4	Machida Zelvia	14	8	5	1	30	10	+20	29	Qualification for the AFC Champions League Elite playoff round
5	Vissel Kobe	14	8	3	3	23	14	+9	27	

Updated to match(es) played on 8 November 2026. Source: JLeague.jp,
Rules for classification: 1) Points; 2) Goal difference; 3) Goals scored; 4) Head-to-head points; 5) Head-to-head goal difference; 6) Head-to-head goals scored; 7) Fewer disciplinary points.

==== Matches ====
8 August 1	Sanfrecce Hiroshima	3–0	JEF United Chiba	Hiroshima
	Shuto Nakano 3'; Akito Suzuki 79'; Takumu Kawamura 88'; Yotaro Nakajima (yellow card) 43'	Report	Erison (yellow card) 66'	Stadium: Edion Peace Wing Hiroshima; Attendance: 27,624; Referee: Koichiro Fukushima

15 August 2	Urawa Red Diamonds	1–4	Sanfrecce Hiroshima	Saitama
	Hayato Araki 22' (o.g.); Kota Kudo (yellow card) 25'; Yūta Miyamoto (yellow card) 35'	Report	Akito Suzuki 16', 75' (yellow card) 22'; Tsukasa Shiotani 45+2'; Sébastien Haller 66'	Stadium: Saitama Stadium 2002; Attendance: 48,707; Referee: Koki Nagamine

22 August 3	Sanfrecce Hiroshima	1–1	Kawasaki Frontale	Hiroshima
	Mutsuki Kato 29' (yellow card) 45'; Tsukasa Shiotani (yellow card) 15'	Report	Yuki Yamamoto 59'; Lazar Romanić (yellow card) 72'	Stadium: Edion Peace Wing Hiroshima; Attendance: 27,057; Referee: Yuzo Sutani

29 August 4	Gamba Osaka	0–0	Sanfrecce Hiroshima	Osaka
	Issam Jebali (yellow card) 11'; Takeru Kishimoto (red card) 87'	Report	Hayao Kawabe (yellow card) 9'	Stadium: Suita City Football Stadium; Attendance: 30,075; Referee: Yusuke Araki

2 September 5	Sanfrecce Hiroshima	3–0	Nagoya Grampus	Hiroshima
	Mutsuki Kato 71'; Akito Suzuki 79'; Sebastian Haller 90'; Taishi Matsumoto (yellow card) 87'	Report	Sho Inagaki (yellow card) 17'; Yota Sato (yellow card) 90+5'	Stadium: Edion Peace Wing Hiroshima; Attendance: 26,892; Referee: Hiroyuki Kimura

6 September 6	Fagiano Okayama	3–2	Sanfrecce Hiroshima	Okayama
	Kota Kawano 10', 21', 50'; Oberdan (yellow card) 17' (yellow-red card) 62'; Eiji Miyamoto (yellow card) 90+5'	Report	Sébastien Haller 45+2'; Hayao Kawabe 65'	Stadium: City Light Stadium; Attendance: 14,613; Referee: Takafumi Mikuriya

12 September 7	Sanfrecce Hiroshima	6–1	Cerezo Osaka	Hiroshima
	Akito Suzuki 10' (pen.), 45+3'; Shun Ayukawa 19', 57', 80' (pen.); Shuto Nakano 55'	Report	Satoki Uejo 90'; Pablo Sabbag (yellow card) 87'	Stadium: Edion Peace Wing Hiroshima; Attendance: 27,165; Referee: Cesar Ramos (Mexico)

19 September 8	Avispa Fukuoka	0–1	Sanfrecce Hiroshima	Fukuoka
	Kaoru Yamawaki (yellow card) 11'; Takumi Kamijima (red card) 24'; Tomoya Miki (yellow card) 32' (yellow-red card) 45+6'	Report	Shunki Higashi 68'; Akito Suzuki (yellow card) 19'; Daiki Suga (yellow card) 36'	Stadium: Best Denki Stadium; Attendance: 12,906; Referee: Koji Takasaki

11 October 9	Tokyo Verdy	0–2	Sanfrecce Hiroshima	Chōfu
	Kim Hyun-woo (yellow card) 15'; Kaito Suzuki (yellow card) 40'; Itsuki Someno (yellow card) 55'	Report	Taishi Matsumoto 47'; Akito Suzuki 58'; Kim Ju-sung (yellow card) 16'	Stadium: Ajinomoto Stadium; Attendance: 18,233; Referee: Hiroki Kasahara

17 October 10	Sanfrecce Hiroshima	3–0	Kyoto Sanga	Hiroshima
	Daiki Suga 48'; Akito Suzuki 79'; Mutsuki Kato 82'; Sébastien Haller (yellow card) 71'	Report	Kyo Sato (yellow card) 31'	Stadium: Edion Peace Wing Hiroshima; Attendance: 26,382; Referee: Koei Koya

21 October 11	V-Varen Nagasaki	4–0	Sanfrecce Hiroshima	Nagasaki
	Hijiri Onaga 36' (yellow card) 28'; Matheus Jesus 45'; Kenshin Yasuda 73', 90+7'; Jonathan (yellow card) 60'	Report	Sébastien Haller (red card) 67'	Stadium: Peace Stadium Connected by SoftBank; Attendance: 18,688; Referee: Hiroyuki Kimura

24 October 12	Sanfrecce Hiroshima	4–0	Shimizu S-Pulse	Hiroshima
	Yasushi Matsumoto 41'; Takuma Asano 50'; Akito Suzuki 69'; Sodai Hasukawa 75' (o.g.); Hayato Araki (yellow card) 90+2'	Report	Ryo Germain (yellow card) 62'	Stadium: Edion Peace Wing Hiroshima; Attendance: 26,014; Referee: Futoshi Nakamura

31 October 13	Mito HollyHock	0–3	Sanfrecce Hiroshima	Mito
	Takumi Mase (red card) 21'; Shota Yamashita (yellow card) 82'	Report	Akito Suzuki 30'; Shuto Nakano 54'; Daiki Suga 83'	Stadium: K's denki Stadium Mito; Attendance: 8,694; Referee: Koei Koya

8 November 14	Machida Zelvia	0–0	Sanfrecce Hiroshima	Tokyo
	Thomas Ouwejan (yellow card) 45+6'	Report	Yotaro Nakajima (yellow card) 45+5'	Stadium: Machida GION Stadium; Attendance: 12,388; Referee: Masuya Ueda

21 November 15	Sanfrecce Hiroshima	2–2	Yokohama F. Marinos	Hiroshima
	Shun Ayukawa 29'; Daiki Suga 72'; Daiya Tono (yellow card) 32'	Report	Yuta Tanaka 66'; Rio Nitta 90+3'; Taishi Matsumoto (yellow card) 87'	Stadium: Edion Peace Wing Hiroshima; Attendance: 26,639; Referee: Koichiro Fukushima

25 November 16	FC Tokyo	–	Sanfrecce Hiroshima	Chōfu
		Report		Stadium: Ajinomoto Stadium

28 November 17	Kashiwa Reysol	–	Sanfrecce Hiroshima	Chiba
		Report		Stadium: Sankyo Frontier Kashiwa Stadium

6 December 18	Sanfrecce Hiroshima	–	Vissel Kobe	Hiroshima
		Report		Stadium: Edion Peace Wing Hiroshima

13 December 19	Sanfrecce Hiroshima	–	Kashima Antlers	Hiroshima
		Report		Stadium: Edion Peace Wing Hiroshima

19 December 20	Nagoya Grampus	–	Sanfrecce Hiroshima	Toyota
		Report		Stadium: Toyota Stadium

13-14 February 21	Sanfrecce Hiroshima	–	Fagiano Okayama	Hiroshima
				Stadium: Edion Peace Wing Hiroshima

20-21 February 22	Sanfrecce Hiroshima	–	Tokyo Verdy	Hiroshima
				Stadium: Edion Peace Wing Hiroshima

27-28 February 23	Shimizu S-Pulse	–	Sanfrecce Hiroshima	Shizuoka
				Stadium: IAI Stadium Nihondaira

6-7 March 24	Cerezo Osaka	–	Sanfrecce Hiroshima	Osaka
				Stadium: Yodoko Sakura Stadium

10 March 25	Sanfrecce Hiroshima	–	Avispa Fukuoka	Hiroshima
				Stadium: Edion Peace Wing Hiroshima

13-14 March 26	Kashima Antlers	–	Sanfrecce Hiroshima	Tokyo
				Stadium: Japan National Stadium

20-21 March 27	Sanfrecce Hiroshima	–	Gamba Osaka	Hiroshima
				Stadium: Edion Peace Wing Hiroshima

3-4 April 28	Vissel Kobe	–	Sanfrecce Hiroshima	Kobe
				Stadium: Noevir Stadium Kobe

10-11 April 29	Yokohama F. Marinos	–	Sanfrecce Hiroshima	Yokohama
				Stadium: Nissan Stadium

16 April 30	Sanfrecce Hiroshima	–	FC Tokyo	Hiroshima
				Stadium: Edion Peace Wing Hiroshima

24-25 April 31	Sanfrecce Hiroshima	–	Machida Zelvia	Hiroshima
				Stadium: Edion Peace Wing Hiroshima

29 April 32	JEF United Chiba	–	Sanfrecce Hiroshima	Chiba
				Stadium: Fukuda Denshi Arena

3-4 May 33	Sanfrecce Hiroshima	–	Urawa Red Diamonds	Hiroshima
				Stadium: Edion Peace Wing Hiroshima

9 May 34	Sanfrecce Hiroshima	–	V-Varen Nagasaki	Hiroshima
				Stadium: Edion Peace Wing Hiroshima

15-16 May 35	Kyoto Sanga	–	Sanfrecce Hiroshima	Kyoto
				Stadium: Sanga Stadium by Kyocera

22-23 May 36	Sanfrecce Hiroshima	–	Kashiwa Reysol	Hiroshima
				Stadium: Edion Peace Wing Hiroshima

29-30 May 37	Sanfrecce Hiroshima	–	Mito HollyHock	Hiroshima
				Stadium: Edion Peace Wing Hiroshima

6 June 38	Kawasaki Frontale	–	Sanfrecce Hiroshima	Kawasaki
				Stadium: Kawasaki Todoroki Stadium

=== Emperor's Cup ===
26 August Rd 2	Sanfrecce Hiroshima	4–1	Okinawa SV	Hiroshima
	Taishi Matsumoto 14'; Mutsuki Kato 41', 50'; Shun Ayukawa 79'; Naoto Arai (yellow card) 76'	Report	12' (o.g.)	Stadium: Fukuyama Transport Rose Stadium; Attendance: 4,778; Referee: Hayato Shimizu

7 October Rd 3	Iwaki FC	0–4	Sanfrecce Hiroshima	Iwaki
	Atsuki Yamanaka (yellow card) 40'; Kaito Fujii (yellow card) 73'	Report	Shun Ayukawa 9'; Akito Suzuki 22', 48'; Shimon Kobayashi 69'; Hayao Kawabe (yellow card) 36'; Yotaro Nakajima (yellow card) 42'	Stadium: Hawaiians Stadium Iwaki; Attendance: 2,156; Referee: Yuzo Sutani

9 December Rd of 16	Kyoto Sanga	–	Sanfrecce Hiroshima	Kyoto
				Stadium: Sanga Stadium by Kyocera

=== J.League Cup ===
29 September Rd 2	Tochigi City	0–2	Sanfrecce Hiroshima	Tochigi
	Ryo Okui (yellow card) 16'	Report	Shun Ayukawa 13'; Mutsuki Kato 23'; Akito Suzuki (yellow card) 17'	Stadium: City Football Station; Attendance: 2,260; Referee: Jumpei Iida

14 October Rd 3	Matsumoto Yamaga	0–1	Sanfrecce Hiroshima	Matsumoto
	Kotatsu Kawakami (yellow card) 70'	Report	Shimon Kobayashi 20' (yellow card) 7'	Stadium: Sunpro Alwin; Attendance: 4,757; Referee: Takuya Kobayashi

28 October Rd 4	Yokohama F. Marinos	4–3	Sanfrecce Hiroshima	Yokohama
	Rio Nitta 53'; Kanata Hirano 59'; Rio Nitta 75'; Kim Ju-Sung 90+4' (o.g.); Yuta Tanaka (yellow card) 7'; Taisei Inoue (yellow card) 15'; Kanta Sekitomi (yellow card) 30'; Shin Midera (yellow card) 45'; Daiya Tono (yellow card) 78'; Tomoki Kondo (yellow card) 85'	Report	Hayato Araki 66'; Naoto Arai 74', 81'; Takuma Asano (yellow card) 50'	Stadium: NHK Spring Mitsuzawa Football Stadium; Attendance: 9,055; Referee: Akihiko Ikeuchi

== Team statistics ==
=== Appearances and goals ===
As of 21 November 2026

No.	Pos.	Player	J1 League		Emperor's Cup		J.League Cup		Total	
No.	Pos.	Player	Apps	Goals	Apps	Goals	Apps	Goals	Apps	Goals
1	GK	(Japan) Keisuke Osako	9	0	1	0	1	0	11	0
3	DF	(Japan) Taichi Yamasaki	0+3	0	1	0	0	0	4	0
4	DF	(Japan) Hayato Araki	15	0	2	0	3	1	20	1
5	DF	(Japan) Naoto Arai	12+3	0	2	0	2+1	2	20	2
6	MF	(Japan) Hayao Kawabe	13+1	1	1+1	0	1+2	0	19	1
7	MF	(Japan) Shunki Higashi	13+2	1	1	0	2	0	18	1
8	MF	(Japan) Takumu Kawamura	2+8	1	1	0	1	0	12	1
9	FW	(Australia) (South Sudan) (England) Kusini Yengi	0+4	0	0	0	0+2	0	6	0
10	FW	(Japan) Akito Suzuki	15	10	2	2	3	0	20	12
11	FW	(Japan) Mutsuki Kato	10+2	3	1	2	2	1	15	6
14	MF	(Japan) Yasushi Matsumoto	4+10	2	1+1	1	2	0	18	3
15	DF	(Japan) Shuto Nakano	15	3	0+1	0	2	0	18	3
18	FW	(Japan) Daiki Suga	4+5	3	2	0	1+2	0	14	3
19	DF	(Japan) Sho Sasaki	8	0	0+1	0	0	0	9	0
21	GK	(Japan) Yudai Tanaka	0	0	0	0	0	0	0	0
22	FW	(Ivory Coast) (France) Sébastien Haller	6+4	3	0+1	0	0+2	0	13	3
23	FW	(Japan) Shun Ayukawa	8+4	4	1+1	2	2	1	16	7
29	FW	(Japan) Takuma Asano	2+4	1	0	0	1+1	0	8	1
32	MF	(Japan) Sota Koshimichi	1+5	0	1	0	2	0	9	0
33	DF	(Japan) Tsukasa Shiotani	3	1	0+1	0	0	0	4	1
35	MF	(Japan) Yotaro Nakajima	11+2	0	2	0	2	0	17	0
37	DF	(South Korea) Kim Ju-sung	5+3	0	0	0	2+1	0	11	0
41	FW	(Japan) Naoki Maeda	1+2	0	1	0	1+1	0	6	0
43	GK	(Japan) Hikaru Ogawa	0	0	0	0	0	0	0	0
45	MF	(Japan) Shimon Kobayashi	1+6	0	0+1	1	1+2	1	11	2
46	MF	(Japan) Rento Noguchi	0+2	0	0+1	0	0	0	3	0
48	MF	(Japan) Hiroto Ota	0	0	0+1	0	0	0	1	0
99	GK	(Japan) (Italy) Ouchi Issei	6	0	1	0	2	0	9	0
Players who have left on loan to other club
Players who have left on permanently
16	DF	(Japan) Takaaki Shichi	0+1	0	1	0	0	0	2	0
