= Sho Sasaki (disambiguation) =

Sho Sasaki may refer to:

- Sho Sasaki (born 1982), Japanese former badminton player
- Sho Sasaki (footballer) (born 1989), Japanese footballer

== See also ==
- 5395 Shosasaki, a minor planet named for University of Tokyo professor Sho Sasaki
