= 2025 Japanese Super Cup =

Vissel Kobe	Sanfrecce Hiroshima
0	2
- Date: 8 February 2025
- Venue: Japan National Stadium, Shinjuku, Tokyo
- Referee: Takafumi Mikuriya
- Attendance: 53,343
- Weather: Fine; 11.7 °C (53.1 °F); 25% humidity

The 2025 Japanese Super Cup (known as Fujifilm Super Cup 2025 for sponsorship reasons) was the 32nd Japanese Super Cup since its reestablishment, and the 40th overall. It was held on 8 February 2025 between the 2024 J1 League champions and Emperor's Cup winners Vissel Kobe and the 2024 J1 League runners-up Sanfrecce Hiroshima, the fourth league runners-up to ever qualify for the competition. It took place at the Japan National Stadium, Shinjuku, Tokyo.

Sanfrecce Hiroshima defeated the double winners 2–0, keeping their perfect record in the Japanese Super Cup since its reestablishment in 1994. They won their fifth Super Cup title and the first since 2016. They were also the first to win the trophy by defeating a double-winning team since themselves in 2008, when they subdued Kashima Antlers. With this defeat, Vissel became the first team to lose consecutive Super Cup matches since Gamba Osaka in 2010 and the first league champions to suffer this feat since Yokohama F. Marinos in 2005.

== Details ==
8 February 2025
13:36 JST

Vissel Kobe	0–2	Sanfrecce Hiroshima
	Report	Arslan 12'; Araki 70'

Japan National Stadium, Tokyo
Attendance: 53,343
Referee: Takafumi Mikuriya

Vissel Kobe	Sanfrecce Hiroshima

GK	21	(Japan) Shota Arai
RB	44	(Japan) Mitsuki Hidaka		(substituted off) 85'
CB	4	(Japan) Tetsushi Yamakawa (c)	(yellow card) 59'
CB	31	(Japan) Takuya Iwanami	(yellow card) 87'
LB	20	(Japan) Yuta Koike		(substituted off) 64'
DM	5	(Japan) Mitsuki Saito	(yellow card) 78'
CM	22	(Japan) Haruka Motoyama		(substituted off) 64'
CM	30	(Japan) Kakeru Yamauchi
RW	2	(Japan) Nanasei Iino		(substituted off) 46'
LW	13	(Japan) Daiju Sasaki		(substituted off) 64'
CF	35	(Japan) Niina Tominaga
Substitutes:
GK	1	(Japan) Daiya Maekawa
DF	3	(Brazil) Matheus Thuler
DF	15	(Japan) Yuki Honda
DF	24	(Japan) Gōtoku Sakai		(substituted in) 64'
MF	6	(Japan) Takahiro Ogihara
MF	11	(Japan) Yoshinori Muto		(substituted in) 64'
MF	14	(Japan) Koya Yuruki		(substituted in) 46'
MF	25	(Japan) Yuya Kuwasaki		(substituted in) 85'
FW	10	(Japan) Yuya Osako		(substituted in) 64'
Manager:
(Japan) Takayuki Yoshida

GK	1	(Japan) Keisuke Osako
CB	33	(Japan) Tsukasa Shiotani
CB	4	(Japan) Hayato Araki
CB	19	(Japan) Sho Sasaki (c)
RM	15	(Japan) Shuto Nakano	(substituted off) 89'
CM	35	(Japan) Yotaro Nakajima
CM	14	(Japan) Satoshi Tanaka	(substituted off) 69'
LM	24	(Japan) Shunki Higashi	(substituted off) 69'
AM	51	(Japan) Mutsuki Kato	(substituted off) 89'
AM	30	(Germany) Tolgay Arslan	(substituted off) 76'
CF	9	(Japan) Ryo Germain
Substitutes:
GK	21	(Japan) Yudai Tanaka
DF	3	(Japan) Taichi Yamasaki
DF	13	(Japan) Naoto Arai	(substituted in) 89'
MF	6	(Japan) Hayao Kawabe	(substituted in) 69'
MF	18	(Japan) Daiki Suga	(substituted in) 69'
MF	20	(Japan) Shion Inoue
MF	32	(Japan) Sota Koshimichi	(substituted in) 89'
FW	11	(Japan) Makoto Mitsuta
FW	39	(Japan) Sota Nakamura	(substituted in) 76'
Manager:
(Germany) Michael Skibbe

Assistant referees:
Masaru Hasegawa
Satoshi Michiyama
Fourth official:
Koei Koya
Video assistant referee:
Futoshi Nakamura
Assistant video assistant referee:
Ryo Hirama

Match rules

- 90 minutes.
- Penalty shoot-out if scores still level.
- Nine named substitutes.
- Maximum of five substitutions, and a maximum of two additional concussion substitutions.

== See also ==
- 2025 J1 League
- 2025 Emperor's Cup
- 2025 J.League Cup
