= Satoshi Tanaka =

Japanese footballer (born 2002)

Satoshi Tanaka 田中 聡
Personal information
- Full name: Satoshi Tanaka
- Date of birth: 13 August 2002 (age 24)
- Place of birth: Nagano, Nagano, Japan
- Height: 1.75 m (5 ft 9 in)
- Position: Defensive midfielder

Team information
- Current team: Schalke 04
- Number: 13

Youth career
- 2007–2014: Nagano FC
- 2014–2017: Nagano Parceiro
- 2018–2020: Shonan Bellmare

Senior career*
Years	Team	Apps	(Gls)
2020–2024	Shonan Bellmare	114	(7)
2022–2023	→ Kortrijk (loan)	15	(0)
2025	Sanfrecce Hiroshima	28	(1)
2026	Fortuna Düsseldorf	13	(0)
2026–	Schalke 04	3	(0)

International career^{‡}
2019	Japan U17	6	(0)
2022	Japan U20	1	(0)
2022–2023	Japan U21	3	(0)
2023–2024	Japan U23	3	(1)
2025–	Japan	3	(0)
Medal record
Men's football
Representing Japan
AFC U-23 Asian Cup
Gold medal – first place	2024 Qatar	Team
- * Club domestic league appearances and goals as of 28 September 2026 ‡ National team caps and goals as of 6 October 2026

Satoshi Tanaka (田中 聡, Tanaka Satoshi; born 13 August 2002) is a Japanese footballer who plays as a defensive midfielder for German Bundesliga club Schalke 04 and the Japan national team.

== Club career ==
=== Shonan Bellmare ===
On 5 April 2019, Tanaka was registered as a type-2 player with Shonan Bellmare. On 26 May 2020, he was promoted to the first team squad. Tanaka made his professional league debut against Yokohama F. Marinos on 8 July 2020. He scored his first league goal for the club against Sanfreece Hiroshima, scoring in the 56th minute.

==== Kortrijk (loan) ====
On 22 August 2022, Tanaka joined Kortrijk in Belgium on loan with an option to buy. He made his league debut for the club against Standard Liège on 28 August 2022. On 4 June 2023, Tanaka returned to Shonan Bellmare from his loan spell.

=== Sanfrecce Hiroshima ===
On 30 December 2024, Tanaka was announced at Sanfrecce Hiroshima on a permanent transfer. He scored his first league goal for the club against Thep Xanh Nam Dinh in the AFC Champions League Two on 12 February 2025, scoring in the 88th minute. Tanaka made his league debut for the club against Machida Zelvia on 16 February 2025.

During his time at Sanfreece Hiroshima, Tanaka won the 2025 Japanese Super Cup.

=== Fortuna Düsseldorf ===
On 30 December 2025, Fortuna Düsseldorf signed Tanaka on a deal until summer 2030, for a reported transfer fee of €1 million.

=== Schalke 04 ===
On 10 June 2026, Tanaka signed a four-year contract with Schalke 04, after they had triggered his release clause of an estimated €1 million.

== International career ==
On 12 February 2019, Tanaka was called up to the Japan U17s for the first time.

On 4 October 2019, Tanaka was called up to the Japan U17 squad for the 2019 FIFA U-17 World Cup.

On 4 April 2024, Tanaka was called up to the Japan U23 squad for the 2024 AFC U-23 Asian Cup. Japan won the competition for the second time in their history.

Tanaka was called up Japan national team squad for the 2025 EAFF E-1 Football Championship. He made his debut on 12 July 2025 in a 2–0 win over China.

== Career statistics ==
=== Club ===
As of match played 20 September 2026

Appearances and goals by club, season and competition
Club	Season	League			National cup (Note: Includes Emperor's Cup and Belgian Cup)		League cup (Note: Includes J. League Cup)		Continental		Other		Total	
Club	Season	Division	Apps	Goals	Apps	Goals	Apps	Goals	Apps	Goals	Apps	Goals	Apps	Goals
Shonan Bellmare	2020	J1 League	17	0	0	0	2	0	—		—		19	0
Shonan Bellmare	2021	J1 League	36	2	2	0	6	0	—		—		44	2
Shonan Bellmare	2022	J1 League	17	0	1	0	6	0	—		—		24	0
Shonan Bellmare	2023	J1 League	11	0	2	0	0	0	—		—		13	0
Shonan Bellmare	2024	J1 League	33	5	3	0	0	0	—		—		36	5
Shonan Bellmare	Total		114	7	8	0	14	0	—		—		136	7
Kortrijk (loan)	2022–23	Belgian Pro League	15	0	1	0	—		—		—		16	0
Sanfrecce Hiroshima	2025	J1 League	28	1	4	2	5	0	9 (Note: Four appearances and one goal in AFC Champions League Two, five appearances in AFC Champions League Elite)	1	1 (Note: Appearance in Japanese Super Cup)	0	47	4
Fortuna Düsseldorf	2025–26	2. Bundesliga	13	0	—		—		—		—		13	0
Schalke 04	2026–27	Bundesliga	3	0	1	0	—		—		—		4	0
Career total			173	8	14	2	19	0	9	1	5	0	216	11

=== International ===
As of match played 5 October 2026

Appearances and goals by national team and year
National team	Year	Apps	Goals
Japan	2025	1	0
Japan	2026	2	0
Total		3	0

== Honours ==
Sanfrecce Hiroshima

- J.League Cup: 2025
- Japanese Super Cup: 2025

Japan U23

- AFC U-23 Asian Cup: 2024

Japan

- EAFF Championship: 2025

Individual

- J.League Best XI: 2025
