= Goro Kawanami =

Japanese footballer

Personal information
- Full name: Goro Kawanami
- Date of birth: April 30, 1991 (age 35)
- Place of birth: Tsukuba, Ibaraki, Japan
- Height: 1.92 m (6 ft 3 1/2 in)
- Position: Goalkeeper

Team information
- Current team: Fagiano Okayama
- Number: 77

Youth career
- 1998–2003: Teshirogi SC
- 2004–2009: Kashiwa Reysol

Senior career*
Years	Team	Apps	(Gls)
2010–2012	Kashiwa Reysol	0	(0)
2011	→ FC Gifu (loan)	10	(0)
2013–2014	Tokushima Vortis	1	(0)
2015–2017	Albirex Niigata	6	(0)
2018–2020	Vegalta Sendai	0	(0)
2021–2025	Sanfrecce Hiroshima	1	(0)
2025–	Fagiano Okayama	2	(0)
Medal record
Kashiwa Reysol
Winner	J1 League	2011
Winner	Emperor's Cup	2012
Vegalta Sendai
Runner-up	Emperor's Cup	2018
- * Club domestic league appearances and goals as of 12 August 2026

Goro Kawanami (川浪 吾郎, Kawanami Gorou; born April 30, 1991) is a Japanese professional footballer who plays as a goalkeeper for J1 League club Fagiano Okayama.

== Club statistics ==
As of 11 July 2022.

Appearances and goals by club, season and competition
Club	Season	League			National cup		League cup		Total	
Club	Season	Division	Apps	Goals	Apps	Goals	Apps	Goals	Apps	Goals
Japan			League		Emperor's Cup		J. League Cup		Total	
Kashiwa Reysol	2010	J2 League	0	0	0	0	-		0	0
Kashiwa Reysol	2012	J1 League	0	0	0	0	0	0	0	0
Kashiwa Reysol	Total		0	0	0	0	0	0	0	0
FC Gifu (loan)	2011	J2 League	10	0	1	0	-		11	0
Tokushima Vortis	2013	J2 League	0	0	0	0	-		0	0
Tokushima Vortis	2014	J1 League	1	0	1	0	4	0	6	0
Tokushima Vortis	Total		1	0	1	0	4	0	6	0
Albirex Niigata	2015	J1 League	0	0	0	0	0	0	0	0
Albirex Niigata	2016	J1 League	5	0	1	0	5	0	11	0
Albirex Niigata	2017	J1 League	1	0	1	0	1	0	3	0
Albirex Niigata	Total		6	0	2	0	6	0	14	0
Vegalta Sendai	2018	J1 League	0	0	1	0	5	0	6	0
Vegalta Sendai	2019	J1 League	0	0	2	0	2	0	4	0
Vegalta Sendai	2020	J1 League	0	0	0	0	0	0	0	0
Vegalta Sendai	Total		0	0	3	0	7	0	10	0
Sanfrecce Hiroshima	2021	J1 League	0	0	0	0	0	0	0	0
Sanfrecce Hiroshima	2022	J1 League	0	0	1	0	3	0	4	0
Sanfrecce Hiroshima	Total		0	0	1	0	3	0	4	0
Career total			17	0	8	0	20	0	45	0

== Honours ==
=== Club ===
Sanfrecce Hiroshima

- J.League Cup: 2022
