= Sota Koshimichi =

Japanese footballer

Sota Koshimichi 越道 草太
Personal information
- Full name: Sota Koshimichi
- Date of birth: April 3, 2004 (age 22)
- Place of birth: Hiroshima, Japan
- Height: 1.80 m (5 ft 11 in)
- Position: Midfielder

Team information
- Current team: Sanfrecce Hiroshima
- Number: 32

Youth career
- Sato-Minami FC
- Sanfrecce Hiroshima

Senior career*
Years	Team	Apps	(Gls)
2022–	Sanfrecce Hiroshima	56	(1)

International career
2021	Japan U17s		
- * Club domestic league appearances and goals as of 9 August 2026

Sota Koshimichi (越道 草太, Koshimichi Sota; born 3 April 2004) is a Japanese footballer who plays as a midfielder for J1 League club Sanfrecce Hiroshima.

== Early life ==
Koshimichi was born in 2004 in Hiroshima City, Hiroshima Prefecture, before playing for Satominami FC (Hiroshima Municipal Kawauchi Elementary School), then Hiroshima Junior Youth (Hiroshima Municipal Jonan Junior High School), and then Hiroshima Youth (Yoshida High School).

== Club career ==
Koshimichi started his career with Sanfrecce Hiroshima after playing for their youth academy. Before the 2023 season, Koshimichi was named as a player to watch for Sanfreece Hiroshima, along with Shuto Nakano.

Koshimichi made his debut for Sanfreece Hiroshima on February 26, coming on in the 90th+1st minute for Hayato Araki.

== International career ==
Koshimichi has been called up to represent Japan at youth level.

== Career statistics ==
=== Club ===
As of 7 April 2024

Appearances and goals by club, season and competition
Club	Season	League			National Cup		League Cup		Other		Total	
Club	Season	Division	Apps	Goals	Apps	Goals	Apps	Goals	Apps	Goals	Apps	Goals
Japan			League		Emperor's Cup		J. League Cup		Other		Total	
Sanfrecce Hiroshima	2022	J1 League	0	0	0	0	0	0	–		0	0
Sanfrecce Hiroshima	2023	J1 League	16	0	2	0	4	0	–		22	0
Sanfrecce Hiroshima	2024	J1 League	3	0	0	0	0	0	0	0	3	0
Sanfrecce Hiroshima	Total		19	0	2	0	4	0	0	0	25	0
Career total			19	0	2	0	4	0	0	0	25	0

== Honours ==
Sanfrecce Hiroshima

- Japanese Super Cup: 2025

== Style of play ==
He is known for his dribbling ability.

== Personal life ==
He is the son of Yasuhiro Koashimichi, who helped him practice football as a child.
