= Ryo Tanada =

Japanese footballer

Ryo Tanada 棚田 遼
Personal information
- Full name: Ryo Tanada
- Date of birth: 19 June 2003 (age 23)
- Place of birth: Hiroshima, Hiroshima, Japan
- Height: 1.73 m (5 ft 8 in)
- Position: Forward

Team information
- Current team: Gainare Tottori (on loan from Sanfrecce Hiroshima)
- Number: 9

Youth career
- Seagull Hiroshima
- –2021: Sanfrecce Hiroshima

Senior career*
Years	Team	Apps	(Gls)
2021–	Sanfrecce Hiroshima	5	(0)
2024	→ Iwaki FC (loan)	10	(0)
2025–	→ Gainare Tottori (loan)	20	(2)

International career
- Japan U19
- * Club domestic league appearances and goals as of 1 January 2026

Ryo Tanada (棚田 遼, Tanada Ryo; born 19 June 2003) is a Japanese footballer who plays as a forward for J3 League club Gainare Tottori on loan from Sanfrecce Hiroshima.

== Career statistics ==
=== Club ===
As of 12 April 2024.

Club	Season	League			National Cup		League Cup		Other		Total	
Club	Season	Division	Apps	Goals	Apps	Goals	Apps	Goals	Apps	Goals	Apps	Goals
Japan			League		Emperor's Cup		J. League Cup		Other		Total	
Sanfrecce Hiroshima	2021	J1 League	0	0	0	0	2	0	0	0	2	0
Sanfrecce Hiroshima	2022	J1 League	4	0	0	0	1	0	0	0	5	0
Sanfrecce Hiroshima	2023	J1 League	1	0	0	0	2	0	0	0	3	0
Sanfrecce Hiroshima	Total		5	0	0	0	5	0	0	0	10	0
Iwaki FC (loan)	2024	J2 League	0	0	0	0	0	0	0	0	0	0
Career total			5	0	0	0	5	0	0	0	10	0
