= Sōta Nakamura =

Japanese footballer

Sōta Nakamura 中村 草太
Personal information
- Date of birth: 15 October 2002 (age 24)
- Place of birth: Takasaki, Gunma, Japan
- Height: 1.68 m (5 ft 6 in)
- Position: Attacking midfielder

Team information
- Current team: Le Havre (on loan from Sanfrecce Hiroshima)

Youth career
- White Star
- –2017: Maebashi FC
- 2018-2020: Maebashi Ikuei High School

College career
Years	Team	Apps	(Gls)
2021–2024	Meiji University		

Senior career*
Years	Team	Apps	(Gls)
2025–	Sanfrecce Hiroshima	48	(11)
2026–	→ Le Havre (loan)	7	(0)

International career^{‡}
2025–	Japan	2	(1)
- * Club domestic league appearances and goals as of 18 October 2026 ‡ National team caps and goals as of 12 July 2025

Sōta Nakamura (中村 草太, Sōta Nakamura; born 15 October 2002) is a Japanese footballer who plays as an attacking midfielder for Ligue 1 club Le Havre on loan from Sanfrecce Hiroshima, and the Japan national team.

== Club career ==
After graduating from Maebashi Ikuei High School, he went on to Meiji University, where he was the top scorer and assist leader in the 97th Kanto University Soccer League in his third year.

On 24 May 2024, it was announced that he would join Sanfrecce Hiroshima from the 2025 season. In the same year, he was named top scorer and assist leader for the second consecutive year at the 98th Kanto University Soccer League, and was also named MVP.

On 12 February 2025, he made his professional debut in the AFC Champions League 2 match against Nam Dinh FC and scored his first professional goal. On the 16th, he played in the J.League opening match against FC Machida Zelvia and scored his first league goal.

On 17 July 2026, Nakamura moved on loan to Le Havre in France.

== Career statistics ==
=== Club ===
As of 18 October 2026:

Club	Season	League			National Cup		League Cup		Continental		Other		Total	
Club	Season	Division	Apps	Goals	Apps	Goals	Apps	Goals	Apps	Goals	Apps	Goals	Apps	Goals
Meiji University	2024	–			1 (Note: Appearances in the Emperor's Cup)	0	–		–		–		1	0
Sanfrecce Hiroshima	2025	J1 League	32	6	5	2	5 (Note: Appearances in the J.League Cup)	1	8 (Note: Four appearances in AFC Champions League Elite, four appearances and four goals in AFC Champions League Two)	4	1 (Note: Appearances in the Japanese Super Cup)	0	51	13
Sanfrecce Hiroshima	2026	J1 (100)	16	5	–		–		4 (Note: Appearances in the AFC Champions League Elite)	0	–		20	5
Sanfrecce Hiroshima	Total		48	11	5	2	5	1	12	4	1	0	71	18
Le Havre (loan)	2026–27	Ligue 1	7	0	0	0	–		–		–		7	0
Career total			55	11	6	2	5	1	12	4	1	0	79	18

=== International ===
As of match played 12 July 2025

Appearances and goals by national team and year
National team	Year	Apps	Goals
Japan	2025	2	1
Total		2	1

Scores and results list Gabon's goal tally first, score column indicates score after each Nakamura goal.

List of international goals scored by Sōta Nakamura
No.	Date	Venue	Opponent	Score	Result	Competition
1.	8 July 2025	Yongin Mireu Stadium, Yongin, South Korea	Hong Kong	6–1	6–1	2025 EAFF E-1 Football Championship

== Honours ==
=== Club ===
Sanfrecce Hiroshima

- J.League Cup: 2025

=== International ===
Japan

- EAFF Championship: 2025
