= Ryo Germain =

Japanese footballer (born 1995)

Ryo Germain ジャーメイン 良
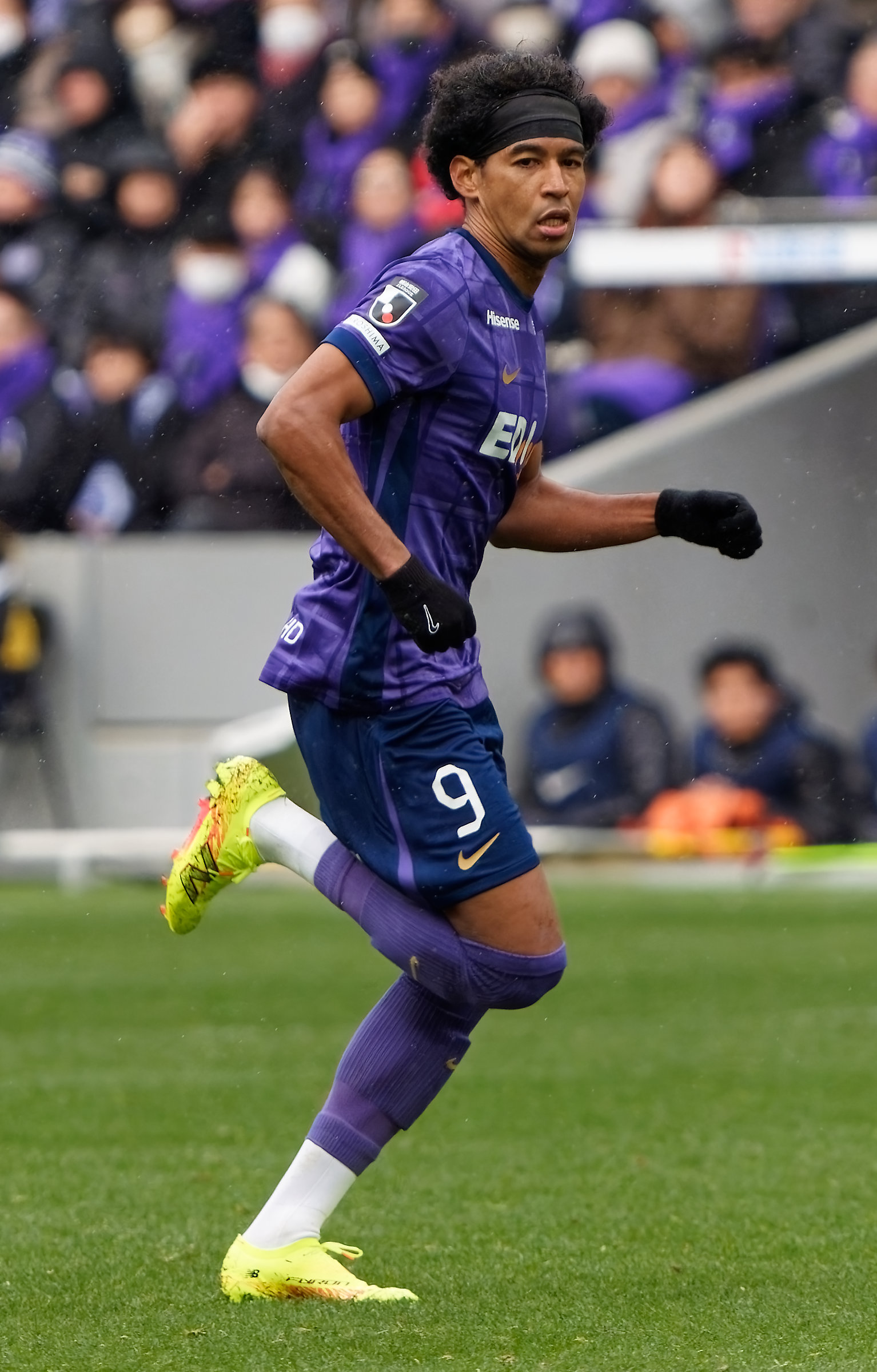
- Germain playing for Sanfrecce Hiroshima in 2025

Personal information
- Full name: Ryo Germain
- Date of birth: 19 April 1995 (age 31)
- Place of birth: Atsugi, Kanagawa, Japan
- Height: 1.82 m (5 ft 11 1/2 in)
- Position: Forward

Team information
- Current team: Shimizu S-Pulse
- Number: 13

Youth career
- Nanmori FC
- FC Atsugi JY Dreams
- 2011–2013: RKU Kashiwa High School

College career
Years	Team	Apps	(Gls)
2014–2017	Ryutsu Keizai University		

Senior career*
Years	Team	Apps	(Gls)
2017–2020	Vegalta Sendai	51	(6)
2021–2022	Yokohama FC	31	(2)
2022–2024	Júbilo Iwata	91	(31)
2025–2026	Sanfrecce Hiroshima	52	(7)
2026–	Shimizu S-Pulse	9	(0)

International career^{‡}
2025–	Japan	3	(5)
- * Club domestic league appearances and goals as of 15:39, 16 October 2026 (UTC) ‡ National team caps and goals as of 13:00, 15 July 2025 (UTC+9)

Ryo Germain (ジャーメイン 良, Jāmein Ryō; born 19 April 1995) is a Japanese professional footballer who plays as a forward for J1 League club Shimizu S-Pulse and the Japan national team.

== College football career ==
=== Ryutsu Keizai University ===
On 25 December 2017, won the championship final. He also scored 11 goals in 22 games in the Kanto University League.

== Club career ==
=== Vegalta Sendai ===
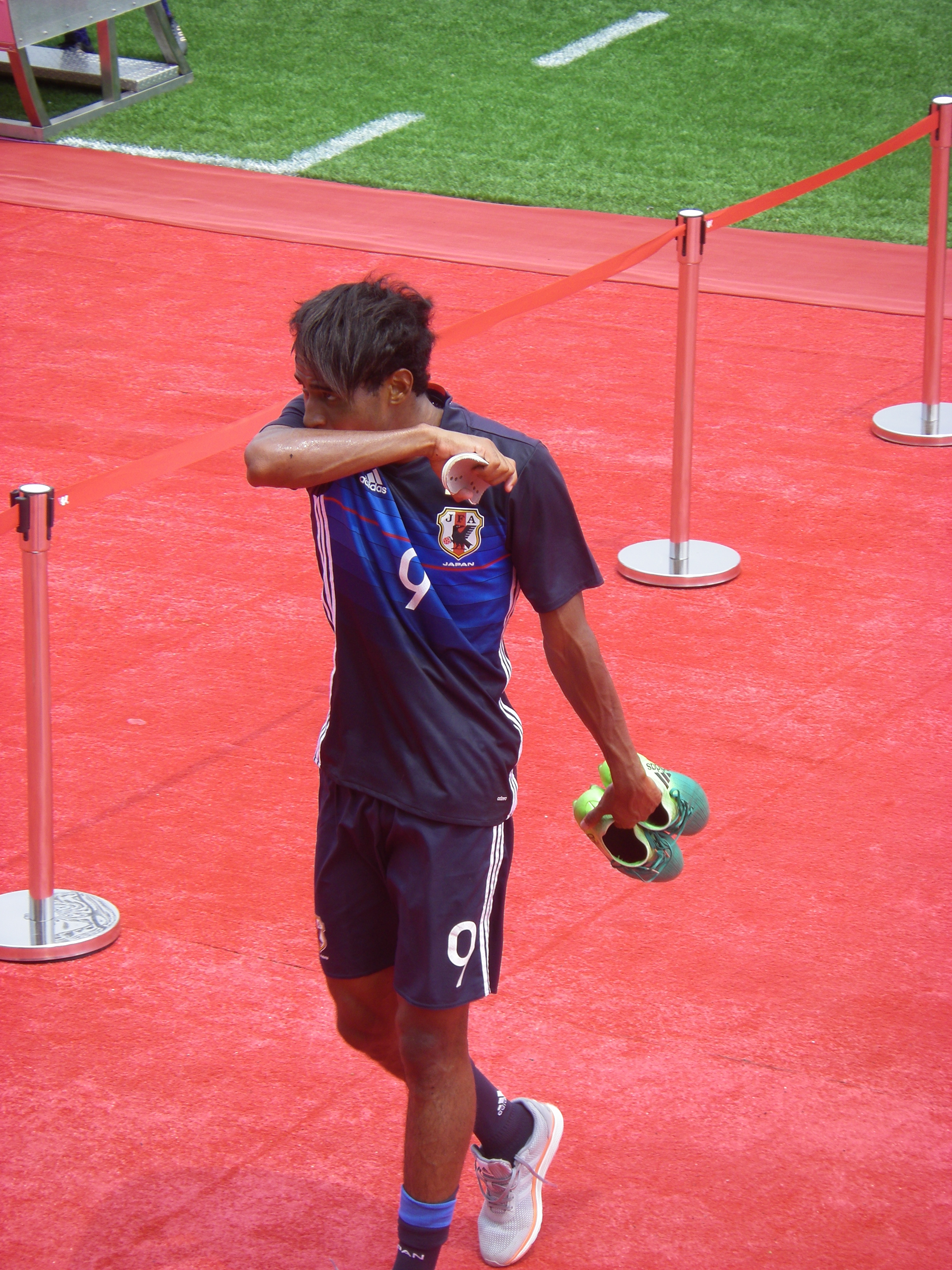
Ryo Germain representing Japan U23 in 2017.

After his graduation from Ryutsu Keizai University in 2017, Ryo Germain joined J1 League club Vegalta Sendai as a Special Designated Player. On 23 July 2017, he scored a penalty in a friendly match against Vissel Kobe. On 27 March 2018, he was promoted to the first team. On 24 December 2018, it was announced that his contract was renewed for the 2019 season.

=== Yokohama FC ===
After three seasons with the Tōhoku outfit, Germain joined J1 League club Yokohama FC in 2021.

=== Júbilo Iwata ===
In 2022, he joined Júbilo Iwata after 36 appearances and just 3 league goals for Fulie. He signed a new contract for the 2024 season.

On 1 March 2024, Germain scores four goals against Kawasaki Frontale at Uvance Todoroki Stadium by Fujitsu and won 5-4 for his team in Matchweek 2 of 2024 J1 League. On 17 March 2024, he was the J1 League top scorer for the third week in a row after scoring against Gamba Osaka.

His performances led him to win the Konami Monthly MVP award for April. He left from the club after relegation from J1 in 2024.

=== Sanfrecce Hiroshima ===
On 25 December 2024, Germain was announced as the newest signing for J1 club, Sanfrecce Hiroshima for the 2025 season.

== International career ==
Germain made his debut for Japan on 7 July 2025 during a 6–1 win against Hong Kong during the 2025 EAFF E-1 Football Championship. During this match, he became the first player to ever score four goals during their international debut. Germain also scored a goal in the final against rival South Korea to help Japan win their third EAFF title.

== Personal life ==
Ryo Germain was born in Atsugi, Kanagawa to an American father and a Japanese mother.

== Career statistics ==
=== Club ===
As of 16 October 2026.

Appearances and goals by club, season and competition
Club	Season	League			National cup (Note: Includes Emperor's Cup)		League cup (Note: Includes J.League Cup)		Continental		Other		Total	
Club	Season	Division	Apps	Goals	Apps	Goals	Apps	Goals	Apps	Goals	Apps	Goals	Apps	Goals
Vegalta Sendai	2017	J1 League	1	0	0	0	2	0	–		–		3	0
Vegalta Sendai	2018	J1 League	17	3	6	3	8	2	–		–		31	8
Vegalta Sendai	2019	J1 League	21	1	2	1	3	2	–		–		26	4
Vegalta Sendai	2020	J1 League	12	2	0	0	1	0	–		–		13	2
Vegalta Sendai	Total		51	6	8	4	14	4	0	0	0	0	73	14
Yokohama FC	2021	J1 League	31	2	1	0	4	1	–		–		36	3
Júbilo Iwata	2022	J1 League	29	3	2	1	5	0	–		–		36	4
Júbilo Iwata	2023	J2 League	31	9	0	0	2	0	–		–		33	9
Júbilo Iwata	2024	J1 League	32	19	0	0	0	0	–		–		32	19
Júbilo Iwata	Total		92	31	2	1	7	0	0	0	0	0	101	32
Sanfrecce Hiroshima	2025	J1 League	36	4	3	0	6	3	11 (Note: Seven appearances, one goal in AFC Champions League Elite) (Note: Four appearances, two goals in AFC Champions League Two)	3	1 (Note: Appearance in Japanese Super Cup)	0	53	8
Sanfrecce Hiroshima	2026	J1 (100)	16	3	–		–		0	0	0	0	16	3
Sanfrecce Hiroshima	Total		52	7	3	0	6	3	11	3	1	0	73	13
Shimizu S-Pulse	2026–27	J1 League	9	0	2	0	0	0	–		–		11	0
Career total			235	46	16	5	31	8	11	3	1	0	294	62

=== International ===
As of match played 15 July 2025

Appearances and goals by national team and year
National team	Year	Apps	Goals
Japan	2025	3	5
Total		3	5

No.	Date	Venue	Cap	Opponent	Score	Result	Competition
1.	8 July 2025	Yongin Mireu Stadium, Yongin, South Korea	1	Hong Kong	1–0	6–1	2025 EAFF E-1 Football Championship
2.	8 July 2025	Yongin Mireu Stadium, Yongin, South Korea	1	Hong Kong	2–0	6–1	2025 EAFF E-1 Football Championship
3.	8 July 2025	Yongin Mireu Stadium, Yongin, South Korea	1	Hong Kong	4–0	6–1	2025 EAFF E-1 Football Championship
4.	8 July 2025	Yongin Mireu Stadium, Yongin, South Korea	1	Hong Kong	5–0	6–1	2025 EAFF E-1 Football Championship
5.	15 July 2025	Yongin Mireu Stadium, Yongin, South Korea	3	South Korea	1–0	1–0	2025 EAFF E-1 Football Championship

== Honours ==
Sanfrecce Hiroshima

- J.League Cup: 2025
- Japanese Super Cup: 2025

Japan

- EAFF Championship: 2025

Individual

- EAFF Championship Most Valuable Player: 2025
- EAFF Championship top goalscorer: 2025
