= Taishi Semba =

Japanese footballer

Taishi Semba 仙波 大志
Personal information
- Date of birth: 19 August 1999 (age 27)
- Place of birth: Fuchū, Hiroshima, Japan
- Height: 1.65 m (5 ft 5 in)
- Position: Attacking midfielder

Team information
- Current team: Mito HollyHock
- Number: 19

Youth career
- –2017: Sanfrecce Hiroshima

College career
Years	Team	Apps	(Gls)
2018–2021	Ryutsu Keizai University		

Senior career*
Years	Team	Apps	(Gls)
2022–2026	Sanfrecce Hiroshima	4	(0)
2022	→ Fagiano Okayama (loan)	62	(4)
2024	→ Thespa Gunma (loan)	14	(1)
2025–2026	→ Mito HollyHock (loan)	26	(1)
2026–	Mito HollyHock	1	(0)

International career
2014	Japan U16		
- * Club domestic league appearances and goals as of 12 August 2026

Taishi Semba (仙波 大志, Semba Taishi; born 19 August 1999) is a Japanese professional footballer who plays as an attacking midfielder for J1 League club Mito HollyHock.

== Career ==
Semba started his career at Sanfrecce Hiroshima and played four times in his debut season in 2022 before being loaned out to J2 League club Fagiano Okayama in July of the same year.

== Career statistics ==
=== Club ===
As of 20 March 2026.

Appearances and goals by club, season and competition
Club	Season	League			National cup (Note: Includes Emperors Cup)		League cup (Note: Includes J.League Cup)		Other		Total	
Club	Season	Division	Apps	Goals	Apps	Goals	Apps	Goals	Apps	Goals	Apps	Goals
Ryutsu Keizai University	2019	–			1	0	–		–		1	0
Ryutsu Keizai University	2021	–			1	0	–		–		1	0
Ryutsu Keizai University	Total		0	0	2	0	0	0	0	0	2	0
Sanfrecce Hiroshima	2022	J1 League	2	0	0	0	2	0	–		4	0
Sanfrecce Hiroshima	2025	J1 League	0	0	2	0	0	0	–		2	0
Sanfrecce Hiroshima	Total		2	0	2	0	2	0	0	0	6	0
Fagiano Okayama (loan)	2022	J2 League	13	1	0	0	0	0	1 (Note: Appearance in J1/J2 play-offs)	0	14	1
Fagiano Okayama (loan)	2023	J2 League	38	2	1	0	0	0	0	0	39	2
Fagiano Okayama (loan)	2024	J2 League	11	1	1	0	2	1	0	0	14	2
Fagiano Okayama (loan)	Total		62	4	2	0	2	1	1	0	67	5
Thespa Gunma (loan)	2024	J2 League	14	1	–		–		–		14	1
Mito Hollyhock (loan)	2025	J2 League	7	0	–		–		–		7	0
Mito Hollyhock (loan)	2026	J1 (100)	7	1	–		–		–		7	1
Mito Hollyhock (loan)	Total		14	1	0	0	0	0	0	0	14	1
Career total			92	6	6	0	4	1	1	0	103	7
