= Aren Inoue =

Japanese footballer (born 2006)

Aren Inoue 井上 愛簾
Personal information
- Date of birth: 19 September 2006 (age 20)
- Place of birth: Kanagawa Prefecture, Japan
- Height: 1.77 m (5 ft 10 in)
- Position: Forward

Team information
- Current team: Matsumoto Yamaga (on loan from Sanfrecce Hiroshima)
- Number: 39

Youth career
- Sanfrecce Hiroshima

Senior career*
Years	Team	Apps	(Gls)
2024–	Sanfrecce Hiroshima	5	(0)
2026–	→ Matsumoto Yamaga (loan)	10	(1)

International career^{‡}
2023	Japan U17	7	(2)
2024–	Japan U20	11	(0)
- * Club domestic league appearances and goals ‡ National team caps and goals as of 10:23, 23 April 2026 (UTC)

Aren Inoue (Japanese: 井上 愛簾; born 19 September 2006) is a Japanese professional footballer who plays as a forward for J3 League club Matsumoto Yamaga, on loan from Sanfrecce Hiroshima.

== Early life ==
Inoue was born on 19 September 2006. Born in Kanagawa Prefecture, Japan, he is of Iranian descent through his father.

== Club career ==
As a youth player, Inoue joined the youth academy of Sanfrecce Hiroshima. Ahead of the 2024 season, he was promoted to the club's senior team.

== International career ==
Inoue is a Japan youth international. During November 2023, he played for the Japan national under-17 football team at the 2023 FIFA U-17 World Cup.

== Career statistics ==
As of 23 April 2026

Appearances and goals by club, season and competition
Club	Season	League			Continental		Total	
Club	Season	Division	Apps	Goals	Apps	Goals	Apps	Goals
Sanfrecce Hiroshima	2024	J1 League	4	0	2 (Note: Appearances in AFC Champions League Two)	1	6	1
Sanfrecce Hiroshima	2025	J1 League	1	0	0	0	1	0
Sanfrecce Hiroshima	Total		5	0	2	1	7	1
Matsumoto Yamaga (loan)	2026	J2/J3 (100)	10	1	–		10	1
Career total			15	1	2	1	17	2
