= Hayato Araki =

Japanese professional footballer

Hayato Araki 荒木 隼人
Personal information
- Full name: Hayato Araki
- Date of birth: 7 August 1996 (age 30)
- Place of birth: Kadoma, Osaka, Japan
- Height: 1.86 m (6 ft 1 in)
- Position: Centre back

Team information
- Current team: Sanfrecce Hiroshima
- Number: 4

Youth career
- –2005: ACBS SC
- 2006–2011: Gamba Osaka
- 2012–2014: Sanfrecce Hiroshima

College career
Years	Team	Apps	(Gls)
2015–2018	Kansai University		

Senior career*
Years	Team	Apps	(Gls)
2019–	Sanfrecce Hiroshima	233	(15)

International career^{‡}
2022–	Japan	5	(0)
Medal record
Men's football
Representing Japan
EAFF Championship
Winner	2022 Japan	Team
- * Club domestic league appearances and goals as of 9 August 2026 ‡ National team caps and goals as of 5 October 2026

Hayato Araki (荒木 隼人, Araki Hayato; born 7 August 1996) is a Japanese professional footballer who plays as a centre back for Sanfrecce Hiroshima and the Japan national team.

== Style of play ==
Araki is a traditional physical centre-back known for his strong aerial presence, aggressive one-on-one defending, and leadership in the defensive line. Standing at 1.86 meters tall, his main strength lies in heading, which makes him effective both defensively when clearing high balls and offensively during set-pieces.

He is also noted for his composure and reading of the game, consistently recording high interception counts and clearances in the J1 League.

== Career statistics ==
As of the start from 2025 season.

Appearances and goals by club, season and competition
Club	Season	League			Cup		League cup		Continental		Other		Total	
Club	Season	Division	Apps	Goals	Apps	Goals	Apps	Goals	Apps	Goals	Apps	Goals	Apps	Goals
Sanfrecce Hiroshima	2019	J1 League	24	2	1	0	1	0	8	1	—		34	3
Sanfrecce Hiroshima	2020	J1 League	33	1	—		1	0	—		—		34	1
Sanfrecce Hiroshima	2021	J1 League	36	1	0	0	2	0	—		—		38	1
Sanfrecce Hiroshima	2022	J1 League	31	2	6	0	10	1	—		—		47	3
Sanfrecce Hiroshima	2023	J1 League	32	1	2	0	4	0	—		—		38	1
Sanfrecce Hiroshima	2024	J1 League	27	3	3	0	5	0	2	1	—		37	4
Sanfrecce Hiroshima	Total		183	10	12	0	23	1	10	2	—		228	13
Career total			183	10	12	0	23	1	10	2	0	0	228	13

== Honours ==
=== Club ===
Sanfrecce Hiroshima

- J.League Cup: 2022, 2025
- Japanese Super Cup: 2025

=== International ===
- EAFF Championship: 2022, 2025

=== Individual ===
- J.League Best XI: 2025
