= Shuto Nakano =

Japanese footballer (born 2000)

Personal information
- Full name: Shuto Nakano
- Date of birth: 27 June 2000 (age 26)
- Place of birth: Ōme, Tokyo, Japan
- Height: 1.82 m (6 ft 0 in)
- Positions: Wing-back; full-back; centre back

Team information
- Current team: Sanfrecce Hiroshima
- Number: 15

Youth career
- AZ'86 Tokyo Ome
- 2016–2018: Kiryu Daiichi High School

College career
Years	Team	Apps	(Gls)
2019–2022	Toin University of Yokohama		

Senior career*
Years	Team	Apps	(Gls)
2019	Toin University of Yokohama FC	12	(1)
2022–	Sanfrecce Hiroshima	127	(11)

International career^{‡}
2026–	Japan	3	(0)
- * Club domestic league appearances and goals as of 9 August 2026 ‡ National team caps and goals as of 14 November 2026

Shuto Nakano (中野 就斗, Nakano Shuto; born 27 June 2000) is a Japanese footballer currently playing as a wing-back, full-back or centre back for Sanfrecce Hiroshima and the Japan national team.

== Early Life ==
Nakano played youth football for AZ'86 Tokyo Ome and Kiryu Daiichi High School before attending Toin University of Yokohama. During his university career, he helped lead Toin University to the All Japan University Football Championship title in 2022, earning Best Defender honors.

== Style of play ==
Nakano is a versatile defender capable of playing as a centre-back, full-back and wing-back. His main strengths include his physical presence, ability in one-on-one defensive situations, work rate and forward-driving runs. Sanfrecce Hiroshima highlighted his defensive duelling ability and forward momentum when announcing his signing from Toin University of Yokohama.

He is noted for his versatility across the defensive line, having been deployed on the right flank as well as in different positions within a back three. Nakano has described his approach to the game as being based on running and competing for the benefit of the team, regardless of his assigned position. He has also emphasised maintaining his intensity and fulfilling his tactical responsibilities throughout the full 90 minutes.

Although primarily a defender, Nakano also contributes to attacking phases through forward runs from deeper positions. In an October 2026 interview, he discussed his increasing involvement as a centre-back in Hiroshima's build-up play, explaining that he looks for opportunities to move beyond the wing-back and join attacks while maintaining his defensive responsibilities. He also noted the greater emphasis on possession and considered decision-making under manager Bartosch Gaul compared with the more direct approach used under Michael Skibbe.

Another distinctive feature of Nakano's game is his long throw-in ability, which provides an additional attacking option during set pieces. His throws played a direct role in two goals in Sanfrecce Hiroshima's 3–1 victory over Kashiwa Reysol in the 2025 J.League YBC Levain Cup final, with both goals originating from long throw-ins delivered by Nakano.

== Career statistics ==
=== Club ===
As of 19 February 2022.

Club	Season	League			National Cup		League Cup		Other		Total	
Club	Season	Division	Apps	Goals	Apps	Goals	Apps	Goals	Apps	Goals	Apps	Goals
Toin University of Yokohama FC	2019	Kantō Soccer League	12	1	0	0	–		0	0	12	1
Toin University of Yokohama	2020	–			1 (Note: Appearances in the Emperor's Cup)	1	–		0	0	1	1
Sanfrecce Hiroshima	2022	J1 League	1	0	0	0	0	0	0	0	1	0
Career total			13	1	1	1	0	0	0	0	14	2

== Honours ==
Sanfrecce Hiroshima

- J.League Cup: 2025
- Japanese Super Cup: 2025

Individual

- J1 100 Year Vision League Regional Round West Best Eleven: 2026
