= Sho Sasaki (footballer) =

Japanese footballer

Sho Sasaki 佐々木 翔
Personal information
- Full name: Sho Sasaki
- Date of birth: 2 October 1989 (age 37)
- Place of birth: Zama, Kanagawa, Japan
- Height: 1.77 m (5 ft 10 in)
- Position: Centre back

Team information
- Current team: Sanfrecce Hiroshima
- Number: 19

Youth career
- 1996–1997: Kurihara FC (AC Rosso)
- 1998–2004: Yokohama F. Marinos
- 2005–2007: Shiroyama High School

College career
Years	Team	Apps	(Gls)
2008–2011	Kanagawa University		

Senior career*
Years	Team	Apps	(Gls)
2012–2014	Ventforet Kofu	102	(8)
2015–	Sanfrecce Hiroshima	311	(16)

International career^{‡}
2018–2022	Japan	15	(2)
Medal record
Sanfrecce Hiroshima
Winner	J1 League	2015
Runner-up	J1 League	2018
Men's football
Representing Japan
EAFF Championship
Winner	2022 Japan	Team
Runner-up	2019 South Korea	Team
AFC Asian Cup
Runner-up	2019 United Arab Emirates	Team
- * Club domestic league appearances and goals as of 9 August 2026 ‡ National team caps and goals as of 27 July 2022

Sho Sasaki (佐々木 翔, born 2 October 1989) is a Japanese professional footballer who plays as a centre-back for Sanfrecce Hiroshima.

== International career ==
On 30 August 2018, Sasaki received his first international callup from the Japan national football team for the Kirin Challenge Cup 2018.

== Career statistics ==
=== Club ===
As of the start from 2025 season.

Appearances and goals by club, season and competition
Club	Season	League	J. League		Emperor's Cup		J. League Cup		Asia		Other (Note: Includes Japanese Super Cup, FIFA Club World Cup and J. League Championship.)		Total	
Club	Season	League	Apps	Goals	Apps	Goals	Apps	Goals	Apps	Goals	Apps	Goals	Apps	Goals
Ventforet Kofu	2012	J2 League	35	2	0	0	—		—		—		35	2
Ventforet Kofu	2013	J1 League	33	3	4	0	4	0	—		—		41	3
Ventforet Kofu	2014	J1 League	34	3	3	0	6	0	—		—		43	3
Ventforet Kofu	Total		102	8	7	0	10	0	—		—		119	8
Sanfrecce Hiroshima	2015	J1 League	22	0	4	0	6	1	—		6	1	38	2
Sanfrecce Hiroshima	2016	J1 League	4	0	0	0	0	0	1	0	1	0	6	0
Sanfrecce Hiroshima	2017	J1 League	0	0	0	0	0	0	—		—		0	0
Sanfrecce Hiroshima	2018	J1 League	34	3	2	0	0	0	—		—		36	3
Sanfrecce Hiroshima	2019	J1 League	31	1	1	0	2	0	6	2	—		40	3
Sanfrecce Hiroshima	2020	J1 League	32	1	—		1	0	—		—		33	1
Sanfrecce Hiroshima	2021	J1 League	30	2	0	0	3	0	—		—		33	2
Sanfrecce Hiroshima	2022	J1 League	34	3	6	1	11	0	—		—		51	4
Sanfrecce Hiroshima	2023	J1 League	32	0	1	0	6	3	—		—		39	3
Sanfrecce Hiroshima	2024	J1 League	36	3	2	2	6	0	—		—		44	5
Sanfrecce Hiroshima	Total		255	13	16	3	35	4	7	2	7	1	320	22
Career total			357	21	23	3	45	4	7	2	7	1	439	31

=== International ===
Appearances and goals by national team and year
National team	Year	Apps	Goals
Japan	2018	3	0
Japan	2019	6	0
Japan	2021	4	1
Japan	2022	2	1
Total		15	2

Scores and results list Japan's goal tally first, score column indicates score after each Sasaki goal.

List of international goals scored by Sho Sasaki
No.	Date	Venue	Opponent	Score	Result	Competition
1	15 June 2021	Panasonic Stadium Suita, Suita, Japan	Kyrgyzstan	4–1	5–1	2022 FIFA World Cup qualification
2	27 July 2022	Toyota Stadium, Toyota, Japan	South Korea	2–0	3–0	2022 EAFF E-1 Football Championship

== Honours ==
=== Club ===
Sanfrecce Hiroshima

- J.League Cup: 2022, 2025
- Japanese Super Cup: 2025

=== International ===
- EAFF Championship: 2022

=== Individual ===
- J.League Best XI: 2024
