= 2023 Sanfrecce Hiroshima season =

Sanfrecce Hiroshima
2023 season
- Manager: Michael Skibbe
- Stadium: Edion Stadium Hiroshima; Hiroshima, Hiroshima
- J1 League: 3rd
- Emperor's Cup: Third round
- J.League Cup: Group stage
- Top goalscorer: League: Douglas Vieira (6 goals); All: Douglas Vieira (6 goals)
- Highest home attendance: 15,749 vs Kashiwa Reysol (19 March; J1 League)
- Lowest home attendance: 3,263 vs FC Tokushima (7 June; Emperor's Cup)
- Average home league attendance: 13,532
- Biggest win: 5–0 vs Vissel Kobe (5 April; J.League Cup); 5–0 vs FC Tokushima (7 June; Emperor's Cup)
- Biggest defeat: 0–2 vs Vissel Kobe (13 May; J1 League); 0–2 vs Albirex Niigata (1 July; J1 League)
Home colours	Away colours
- All statistics correct as of 2 July 2023.

The 2023 Sanfrecce Hiroshima season was their 85th season in existence and their 15th consecutive season in the J1 League. In addition to the league, the club competed in the Emperor's Cup and J. League Cup. As the third-placed team on last season's J1 League, they would have been qualified to the 2023–24 AFC Champions League play-offs. However, on 6 May, they lost their continental participation spot as Urawa Red Diamonds won the 2022 AFC Champions League.

== Players ==
=== Current squad ===
Note: Flags indicate national team as defined under FIFA eligibility rules; some limited exceptions apply. Players may hold more than one non-FIFA nationality.

No.	Pos.	Nation	Player
1	GK	JPN	Takuto Hayashi
2	DF	USA	Jelani Reshaun Sumiyoshi
3	DF	JPN	Taichi Yamasaki
4	DF	JPN	Hayato Araki
5	MF	JPN	Hiroya Matsumoto
6	MF	JPN	Toshihiro Aoyama
7	MF	JPN	Gakuto Notsuda
8	MF	JPN	Takumu Kawamura
9	FW	BRA	Douglas Vieira
10	MF	BRA	Marcos Júnior
11	FW	JPN	Makoto Mitsuta
13	FW	SUI	Nassim Ben Khalifa
14	MF	BRA	Ezequiel
15	DF	JPN	Shuto Nakano
16	DF	JPN	Takaaki Shichi
17	MF	JPN	Taishi Matsumoto
18	MF	JPN	Yoshifumi Kashiwa

No.	Pos.	Nation	Player
19	DF	JPN	Sho Sasaki (captain)
20	FW	CYP	Pieros Sotiriou
21	GK	JPN	Yudai Tanaka
22	GK	JPN	Goro Kawanami
24	MF	JPN	Shunki Higashi
25	MF	JPN	Yusuke Chajima
28	FW	JPN	Ryo Tanada
30	MF	JPN	Kosei Shibasaki
32	MF	JPN	Sota Koshimichi
33	DF	JPN	Tsukasa Shiotani
35	MF	JPN	Yotaro Nakajima ^{Type 2}
38	GK	JPN	Keisuke Osako
51	FW	JPN	Mutsuki Kato
—	GK	JPN	Koshin Yamada ^{Type 2}
—	MF	JPN	Miran Ishihara ^{Type 2}
—	FW	JPN	Shota Kofie ^{Type 2}
—	FW	JPN	Hagumu Nakagawa ^{Type 2}

=== Out on loan ===
Note: Flags indicate national team as defined under FIFA eligibility rules; some limited exceptions apply. Players may hold more than one non-FIFA nationality.

No.	Pos.	Nation	Player
—	MF	JPN	Kodai Dohi (at FC Imabari)
—	MF	JPN	Motoki Ohara (at Mito HollyHock)

No.	Pos.	Nation	Player
—	MF	JPN	Taishi Semba (at Fagiano Okayama)
—	FW	JPN	Shun Ayukawa (at Oita Trinita)

== Transfers ==
Transfers in
Join on	Pos.	Player	Moving from	Transfer type
Pre-season	GK	(Japan) Yudai Tanaka	(Japan) Blaublitz Akita	Full transfer
Pre-season	DF	(Japan) Takaaki Shichi	(Japan) Avispa Fukuoka	Full transfer
Pre-season	DF	(Japan) Shuto Nakano	(Japan) Toin University of Yokohama	Free transfer
Pre-season	MF	(Japan) Hiroya Matsumoto	(Japan) Zweigen Kanazawa	Loan return
Pre-season	MF	(Japan) Taichi Yamasaki	(Japan) Juntendo University	Free transfer
Pre-season	MF	(Japan) Sota Koshimichi	Sanfrecce Hiroshima U18s	Promotion

Transfers out
Leave on	Pos.	Player	Moving to	Transfer type
Pre-season	DF	(Japan) Yuki Nogami	(Japan) Nagoya Grampus	Full transfer
Pre-season	DF	(Japan) Osamu Henry Iyoha	(Japan) Kyoto Sanga	Full transfer
Pre-season	DF	(Japan) Yuta Imazu	(Japan) V-Varen Nagasaki	Full transfer
Pre-season	MF	(Japan) Tomoya Fujii	(Japan) Kashima Antlers	Full transfer
Pre-season	MF	(Japan) Kodai Dohi	(Japan) Ventforet Kofu	Loan transfer
Pre-season	MF	(Japan) Motoki Ohara	(Japan) Mito HollyHock	Loan transfer
Pre-season	FW	(Brazil) Júnior Santos	(Brazil) Fortaleza EC	Full transfer
Pre-season	FW	(Japan) Ryo Nagai	(Japan) Fagiano Okayama	Full transfer; Loan made permanent

=== Pre-season friendlies ===
15 January Training match	Sanfrecce Hiroshima	1–1	(Poland) Górnik Zabrze	Antalya
15:00 UTC+3	Sotiriou 69' (pen.)	Report	Krawczyk 67' (pen.)	Stadium: Kaya Palazzo Golf Resort

18 January Training match	Sanfrecce Hiroshima	1–0	(Bulgaria) CSKA Sofia	Antalya
15:00 UTC+3	Matsumoto 88'	Report		Stadium: Kaya Palazzo Golf Resort

21 January Training match	Sanfrecce Hiroshima	1–2	(Austria) LASK Linz	Antalya
15:00 UTC+3	Tanada 105'	Report	Koulouris 47'; Ljubičić 82' (pen.)	Stadium: Kaya Palazzo Golf Resort
Note: This match in special had both halves lasting 60 minutes each, with the whole match lasting 120 minutes.

23 January Training match	Sanfrecce Hiroshima	0–0	(Serbia) Mladost Lučani	Antalya
17:00 UTC+3		Report		Stadium: tssFC Football Center

25 January Training match	Sanfrecce Hiroshima	3–2	(Turkey) Kasımpaşa SK	Antalya
13:30 UTC+3	Shibasaki 45+1'; Nakajima 82'; Tanada 86'	Report	58', 78'	Stadium: Kasımpaşa SK Training Ground

1 February Training match	Sanfrecce Hiroshima	1–2	(Japan) Machida Zelvia	Miyazaki
11:00 UTC+9	Ben Khalifa 23'	Report		Stadium: Seagaia Square 1
Note: The match was played with three halves lasting 45 minutes each.

8 February Training match	Sanfrecce Hiroshima	4–2	(South Korea) FC Seoul	Miyazaki
13:00 UTC+9	Kawamura 24'; Matsumoto 42'; Ezequiel 71'; Nakajima 123'	Report		Stadium: Seagaia Square 1
Note: The match was played with three halves lasting 45 minutes each.

== Competitions ==
=== Overall record ===
Competition	First match	Last match	Starting round	Final position	Record							
Competition	First match	Last match	Starting round	Final position	Pld	W	D	L	GF	GA	GD	Win %
J1 League	19 February	--	Matchday 1	3rd	34	17	7	10	42	28	+14	50.00
Emperor's Cup	7 June	--	Third round	3rd round	2	1	0	1	5	2	+3	50.00
J.League Cup	8 March	--	Group stage	Group stage	6	3	0	3	12	7	+5	50.00
Total					42	21	7	14	59	37	+22	50.00

Source: Soccerway

=== J1 League ===
After the club surpassed many fans' expectations with their last season's performances, the club finished in the 3rd place on the 2022 J1 League. This season, their squad was barely touched, with only a few regulars leaving the team.

==== League table ====
Pos	Team	Pld	W	D	L	GF	GA	GD	Pts	Qualification or relegation
1	Vissel Kobe (C)	34	21	8	5	60	29	+31	71	Qualification for the AFC Champions League Elite league stage
2	Yokohama F. Marinos	34	19	7	8	63	40	+23	64	Qualification for the AFC Champions League Elite league stage
3	Sanfrecce Hiroshima	34	17	7	10	42	28	+14	58	Qualification for the AFC Champions League Two group stage
4	Urawa Red Diamonds	34	15	12	7	42	27	+15	57	
5	Kashima Antlers	34	14	10	10	43	34	+9	52	

Source: JLeague.jp, J.League Data Site
Rules for classification: 1) Points; 2) Goal difference; 3) Goals scored; 4) Head-to-head points; 5) Head-to-head goal difference; 6) Head-to-head goals scored; 7) Fewer disciplinary points.
(C) Champions

==== Results summary ====
Overall								Home						Away					
Pld	W	D	L	GF	GA	GD	Pts	W	D	L	GF	GA	GD	W	D	L	GF	GA	GD
34	17	7	10	42	28	+14	58	10	4	3	26	13	+13	7	3	7	16	15	+1

Last updated: 8 April 2024.
Source: Soccerway

==== Matches ====
The opening match was released by the J.League on 23 December 2022. The full league fixtures were released on 20 January 2023.

18 February 1	Sanfrecce Hiroshima	0–0	Hokkaido Consadole Sapporo	Hiroshima
14:00 JST	Ben Khalifa (yellow card) 51'; Kawamura (yellow card) 59'	Report	Suga (yellow card) 90+2'	Stadium: Edion Stadium Hiroshima; Attendance: 13,121; Referee: Takafumi Mikuriya

26 February 2	Sanfrecce Hiroshima	1–2	Albirex Niigata	Hiroshima
14:00 JST	Shiotani 79'; Morishima (yellow card) 90'	Report	Ota 14'; Suzuki 37'; Deng (yellow card) 45+1'; Shimada (yellow card) 78'; Nescau (yellow card) 90+8'	Stadium: Edion Stadium Hiroshima; Attendance: 13,266; Referee: Takuto Okabe

3 March 3	Yokohama F. Marinos	1–1	Sanfrecce Hiroshima	Yokohama
19:00 JST	Anderson Lopes 19'; Inoue (yellow card) 40'; Nagato (red card) 77'; Tsunoda (yellow card) 90+4'	Report	Higashi 4' (yellow card) 29'; Ben Khalifa (yellow card) 65'; Sotiriou (yellow card) 71'; Notsuda (yellow card) 74'	Stadium: Nippatsu Mitsuzawa Stadium; Attendance: 10,854; Referee: Futoshi Nakamura

12 March 4	Gamba Osaka	1–2	Sanfrecce Hiroshima	Osaka
16:00 JST	Lavi (yellow card) 31'; Usami 70'	Report	Ben Khalifa 2'; Sotiriou (yellow card) 19'; Mitsuta 90+4' (pen.)	Stadium: Panasonic Stadium Suita; Attendance: 18,765; Referee: Akihiko Ikeuchi

19 March 5	Sanfrecce Hiroshima	1–0	Kashiwa Reysol	Hiroshima
14:00 JST	Shiotani 82'	Report	Shiihashi (yellow card) 10'; Grot (yellow card) 50'	Stadium: Edion Stadium Hiroshima; Attendance: 15,479; Referee: Shu Kawamata

1 April 6	Kashima Antlers	1–2	Sanfrecce Hiroshima	Kashima
15:00 JST	Chinen 69'	Report	Mitsuta (yellow card) 21'; Vieira 86' (pen.), 88'	Stadium: Kashima Soccer Stadium; Attendance: 15,414; Referee: Koichiro Fukushima

9 April 7	Sanfrecce Hiroshima	1–0	Sagan Tosu	Hiroshima
14:00 JST	Douglas Vieira 75'		Naganuma (yellow card) 74'	Stadium: Edion Stadium Hiroshima; Attendance: 13,681; Referee: Takuto Okabe

15 April 8	Yokohama FC	0–3	Sanfrecce Hiroshima	Yokohama
14:00 JST	Ogawa (yellow card) 23'	Report	Sasaki (yellow card) 8'; Higashi 49'; Nduka 73' (o.g.); Douglas Vieira 76'	Stadium: Nippatsu Mitsuzawa Stadium; Attendance: 3,935; Referee: Yudai Yamamoto

22 April 9	Sanfrecce Hiroshima	1–2	FC Tokyo	Hiroshima
14:00 JST	Higashi (yellow card) 12'; Morishima 38'; Kawamura (yellow card) 50'	Report	Nakamura (yellow card) 2' (goal) 5'; Abe 28'; Morishige (yellow card) 85'	Stadium: Edion Stadium Hiroshima; Attendance: 13,801; Referee: Hiroki Kasahara

29 April 10	Cerezo Osaka	0–1	Sanfrecce Hiroshima	Osaka
14:00 JST	Léo Ceará (yellow card) 90+1'	Report	Douglas Vieira 90+3' (yellow card) 90+4'	Stadium: Yodoko Sakura Stadium; Attendance: 16,151; Referee: Yuichi Nishimura

7 May 12	Sanfrecce Hiroshima	3–1	Avispa Fukuoka	Hiroshima
13:00 JST	Ben Khalifa (yellow card) 27'; Sotiriou 50'; Yamagishi 72' (o.g.); Kawamura 89'	Report	Oda (yellow card) 11'; Yamagishi 30'; Maejima (yellow card) 54'	Stadium: Edion Stadium Hiroshima; Attendance: 10,415; Referee: Ryo Tanimoto

13 May 13	Vissel Kobe	2–0	Sanfrecce Hiroshima	Kobe
14:00 JST	Araki 47' (o.g.); Thuler (yellow card) 84'; Ide (yellow card) 89'; Muto 90+5'	Report	Shichi (yellow card) 28'; Araki (yellow card) 64'; Nakano (yellow card) 71'	Stadium: Noevir Stadium Kobe; Attendance: 15,741; Referee: Futoshi Nakamura

20 May 14	Nagoya Grampus	2–1	Sanfrecce Hiroshima	Nagoya
15:00 JST	Yonemoto (yellow card) 29'; Nakatani (yellow card) 35'; Junker 43', 48'; Morishita (yellow card) 77'	Report	Kawamura 37'; Araki (yellow card) 50'	Stadium: Toyota Stadium; Attendance: 15,506; Referee: Koei Koya

27 May 15	Sanfrecce Hiroshima	1–0	Shonan Bellmare	Hiroshima
14:00 JST	Ezequiel (yellow card) 26'; Douglas Vieira 79' (pen.)	Report	Tachi (red card) 13'; Sugioka (yellow card) 77'	Stadium: Edion Stadium Hiroshima; Attendance: 11,916; Referee: Hajime Matsuo

31 May 11	Urawa Red Diamonds	2–1	Sanfrecce Hiroshima	Saitama
19:30 JST	Sakai 72'; Ito 90+2'	Report	Morishima 50'; Notsuda (yellow card) 63'	Stadium: Saitama Stadium 2002; Attendance: 20,266; Referee: Jumpei Iida

4 June 16	Sanfrecce Hiroshima	3–1	Kyoto Sanga	Hiroshima
14:00 JST	Chajima 59', 71'; Sasaki (yellow card) 64'; Kawamura 90+3'	Report	Toyokawa 69'	Stadium: Edion Stadium Hiroshima; Attendance: 14,678; Referee: Yuichi Nishimura

11 June 17	Kawasaki Frontale	1–0	Sanfrecce Hiroshima	Kawasaki
19:00 JST	Ominami (yellow card) 18'; Wakizaka 56'	Report	Douglas Vieira (yellow card) 90+4'	Stadium: Kawasaki Todoroki Stadium; Attendance: 18,051; Referee: Ryo Tanimoto

24 June 18	Sanfrecce Hiroshima	0–1	Yokohama F. Marinos	Hiroshima
19:00 JST	Douglas Vieira (yellow card) 64'	Report	Élber 40'	Stadium: Edion Stadium Hiroshima; Attendance: 15,163; Referee: Jumpei Iida

1 July 19	Albirex Niigata	2–0	Sanfrecce Hiroshima	Niigata
18:00 JST	Mito 25'; Arai 28'	Report	Kawamura (yellow card) 23'; Araki (yellow card) 33'	Stadium: Denka Big Swan Stadium; Attendance: 19,064; Referee: Yuichi Nishimura

8 July 20	Sanfrecce Hiroshima	v	Kashima Antlers	Hiroshima
18:30 JST				Stadium: Edion Stadium Hiroshima

16 July 21	Sanfrecce Hiroshima	v	Yokohama FC	Hiroshima
18:00 JST				Stadium: Edion Stadium Hiroshima

5 August 22	Shonan Bellmare	v	Sanfrecce Hiroshima	Hiratsuka
19:00 JST				Stadium: Lemon Gas Stadium Hiratsuka

13 August 23	Sanfrecce Hiroshima	v	Urawa Red Diamonds	Hiroshima
18:00 JST				Stadium: Edion Stadium Hiroshima

19 August 24	Sanfrecce Hiroshima	v	Kawasaki Frontale	Hiroshima
19:00 JST				Stadium: Edion Stadium Hiroshima

26 August 25	Kashiwa Reysol	v	Sanfrecce Hiroshima	Kashiwa
19:00 JST				Stadium: Sankyo Frontier Kashiwa Stadium

1 September 26	Sagan Tosu	v	Sanfrecce Hiroshima	Tosu
--:-- JST				Stadium: Ekimae Real Estate Stadium

15 September 27	Sanfrecce Hiroshima	v	Vissel Kobe	Hiroshima
--:-- JST				Stadium: Edion Stadium Hiroshima

22 September 28	Kyoto Sanga	v	Sanfrecce Hiroshima	Kyoto
--:-- JST				Stadium: Sanga Stadium by Kyocera

29 September 29	Sanfrecce Hiroshima	v	Nagoya Grampus	Hiroshima
--:-- JST				Stadium: Edion Stadium Hiroshima

20 October 30	Sanfrecce Hiroshima	v	Cerezo Osaka	Hiroshima
--:-- JST				Stadium: Edion Stadium Hiroshima

27 October 31	FC Tokyo	v	Sanfrecce Hiroshima	Tokyo
--:-- JST				Stadium: Ajinomoto Stadium

10 November 32	Hokkaido Consadole Sapporo	v	Sanfrecce Hiroshima	Sapporo
--:-- JST				Stadium: Sapporo Dome

24 November 33	Sanfrecce Hiroshima	v	Gamba Osaka	Hiroshima
--:-- JST				Stadium: Edion Stadium Hiroshima

2 December 34	Avispa Fukuoka	v	Sanfrecce Hiroshima	Fukuoka
--:-- JST				Stadium: Best Denki Stadium

=== Emperor's Cup ===
As a J1 League club, it started in the 2nd round of the competition. Sanfrecce was the runner-up of the competition in the previous season.

7 June Second round	Sanfrecce Hiroshima	5–0	FC Tokushima	Fukuyama
19:00	Ben Khalifa 7'; Matsumoto 33', 75'; Nakano 72'; Morishima 79'	Report	Yamamoto (yellow card) 14'	Stadium: Fukuyama Stadium; Attendance: 3,263; Referee: Masuya Ueda

12 July Third round	Sanfrecce Hiroshima	0-2	Tochigi SC	Utsunomiya
19:00	Ben Khalifa (yellow card) 45+2'; Matsumoto (yellow card) 54'	Report	Oshima 54' (pen.); Nishitani 90+4'; Yoshida (yellow card) 52'; Hiramatsu (yellow card) 65'	Stadium: Kanseki Stadium Tochigi; Attendance: 2,552; Referee: Yudai Yamamoto

=== J.League Cup ===
As every other club, Sanfrecce starts the competition at the group stage. The club will play the season as the defending champions, after they won past Cerezo Osaka in the 2022 J.League Cup Final by a 2–1 win, which was earned with a last-minute comeback.

Pos	Team	Pld	W	D	L	GF	GA	GD	Pts	Qualification
1	Nagoya Grampus	6	5	0	1	11	5	+6	15	Advance to knockout stage
2	Sanfrecce Hiroshima	6	3	0	3	12	7	+5	9	
3	Yokohama FC	6	2	0	4	7	10	−3	6 (Note: Head-to-head points: Yokohama FC 3, Vissel Kobe 3. Head-to-head goal differences: Yokohama FC +1, Vissel Kobe –1.)	
4	Vissel Kobe	6	2	0	4	4	12	−8	6	

Source: JLeague.co (EN), JLeague.jp (JA)
Rules for classification: Tiebreakers
Notes:

8 March	Sanfrecce Hiroshima	3–1	Yokohama FC	Hiroshima
19:03 JST	Sumiyoshi (yellow card) 62'; Mitsuta 75'; Sasaki 80'; Sugita 88' (o.g.)	Report	Nishiyama (yellow card) 14'; Caprini 59'	Stadium: Edion Stadium Hiroshima; Attendance: 5,249; Referee: Tetsuro Yoshida

26 March	Sanfrecce Hiroshima	1–2	Nagoya Grampus	Hiroshima
14:03 JST	Kawamura 29'; Shibasaki (yellow card) 56'	Report	Morishita 61'; Nagai 63'	Stadium: Edion Stadium Hiroshima; Attendance: 8,807; Referee: Hiroyuki Kimura

5 April	Vissel Kobe	0–5	Sanfrecce Hiroshima	Kobe
19:03 JST	Izumi (yellow card) 40'	Report	Sasaki 31'; Mitsuta 53', 70'; Kawamura 60'; Yamasaki 87'	Stadium: Noevir Stadium Kobe; Attendance: 4,434; Referee: Koei Koya

19 April	Sanfrecce Hiroshima	2–1	Vissel Kobe	Hiroshima
19:03 JST	Shichi (yellow card) 63'; Sasaki 73'; Nakano 82'	Report	Thuler (yellow card) 13'; Lincoln 69' (pen.) (yellow card) 86'; Saito (yellow card) 83'; Osaki (yellow card) 90+5'	Stadium: Edion Stadium Hiroshima; Attendance: 5,877; Referee: Jumpei Iida

24 May	Yokohama FC	1–0	Sanfrecce Hiroshima	Yokohama
19:03 JST	Yuri 29'; Mita (yellow card) 90'; Takashio (yellow card) 90'	Report	Kawamura (yellow card) 89'; Douglas Vieira (yellow card) 90+5'	Stadium: Nippatsu Mitsuzawa Stadium; Attendance: 2,754; Referee: Hiroyuki Kimura

18 June	Nagoya Grampus	2–1	Sanfrecce Hiroshima	Nagoya
18:03 JST	Izumi (yellow card) 10' (goal) 37'; Ishida 68'; Takeda (yellow card) 89'	Report	Ben Khalifa (yellow card) 64'; Shibasaki 80'; Aoyama (yellow card) 90+2'	Stadium: Toyota Stadium; Attendance: 7,806; Referee: Futoshi Nakamura

== Goalscorers ==
As of 2 July 2023.

Rank	Pos.	No.	Player	J1 League	Emperor's Cup	J.League Cup	AFC CL	Total
1	FW	9	(Brazil) Douglas Vieira	6	0	0	0	6
2	MF	8	(Japan) Takumu Kawamura	3	0	2	0	5
3	FW	11	(Japan) Makoto Mitsuta	1	0	3	0	4
3	DF	19	(Japan) Sho Sasaki	1	0	3	0	4
5	MF	10	(Japan) Tsukasa Morishima	2	1	0	0	3
6	DF	3	(Japan) Tsukasa Shiotani	2	0	0	0	2
6	MF	25	(Japan) Yusuke Chajima	2	0	0	0	2
6	FW	13	(Switzerland) Nassim Ben Khalifa	1	1	0	0	2
6	DF	15	(Japan) Shuto Nakano	0	1	1	0	2
6	DF	5	(Japan) Hiroya Matsumoto	0	2	0	0	2
11	FW	20	(Cyprus) Pieros Sotiriou	1	0	0	0	1
11	DF	24	(Japan) Shunki Higashi	1	0	0	0	1
11	DF	3	(Japan) Taichi Yamasaki	0	0	1	0	1
11	MF	30	(Japan) Kosei Shibasaki	0	0	1	0	1
Total				20	5	11	0	36
