= 2019 Sanfrecce Hiroshima season =

Sanfrecce Hiroshima
2019 season
- Chairman: Kaoru Koyano
- Manager: Hiroshi Jofuku
- Stadium: Hiroshima Big Arch
- AFC Champions League: Last 16
- Average home league attendance: 13,886
Home colours	Away colours

The 2019 Sanfrecce Hiroshima season saw the team competing in the J1 League, they finished runners-up in the 2018 J1 League. They also competed in the J.League Cup, Emperor's Cup, and AFC Champions League.

== Squad ==
As of 25 February 2019

Note: Flags indicate national team as defined under FIFA eligibility rules; some limited exceptions apply. Players may hold more than one non-FIFA nationality.

No.	Pos.	Nation	Player
1	GK	JPN	Takuto Hayashi
2	DF	JPN	Yuki Nogami
3	DF	SWE	Emil Salomonsson
4	DF	JPN	Hiroki Mizumoto
5	MF	JPN	Kyohei Yoshino
6	DF	JPN	Toshihiro Aoyama (captain)
7	MF	JPN	Gakuto Notsuda
8	FW	KOS	Besart Berisha
10	FW	BRA	Patric
13	DF	JPN	Akira Ibayashi
14	MF	JPN	Tsukasa Morishima
15	MF	JPN	Sho Inagaki
16	FW	JPN	Daiki Watari
17	MF	JPN	Taishi Matsumoto
18	MF	JPN	Yoshifumi Kashiwa (vice-captain)
19	DF	JPN	Sho Sasaki

No.	Pos.	Nation	Player
20	FW	BRA	Douglas Vieira
21	GK	JPN	Ryotaro Hironaga
22	MF	JPN	Yusuke Minagawa
23	DF	JPN	Hayato Araki
24	FW	JPN	Shunki Higashi
25	MF	JPN	Hiroya Matsumoto
26	MF	JPN	Ayumu Kawai
27	DF	JPN	Kohei Shimizu (on loan from Shimizu S-Pulse)
30	MF	JPN	Kosei Shibasaki
33	DF	JPN	Takuya Wada
34	GK	JPN	Hirotsugu Nakabayashi
38	GK	JPN	Keisuke Osako
40	MF	JPN	Hayao Kawabe
44	MF	BRA	Rhayner (on loan from Tombense)
50	DF	JPN	Soya Takahashi

== Competitions ==
=== J1 League ===
==== Results ====
23 February 2019 1	Sanfrecce Hiroshima	1 – 1	Shimizu S-Pulse	EDION Stadium
14:03 JST	Salomonsson 57'	Report	Kitagawa 30'; Hwang (yellow card) 36'	Attendance: 14,084; Referee: Yusuke Araki

1 March 2019 2	Sanfrecce Hiroshima	0 – 0	Jubilo Iwata	EDION Stadium
19:03 JST	Yoshino (yellow card) 8'; Patric (yellow card) 69'	Report		Attendance: 7,741; Referee: Hajime Matsuo

9 March 2019 3	Cerezo Osaka	0 – 1	Sanfrecce Hiroshima	Yanmar Stadium Nagai
14:03 JST	Katayama (yellow card) 33'; Matsuda (yellow card) 58'; Desábato (yellow card) 81'	Report	Douglas Vieira (yellow card) 5'; Salomonsson 18'	Attendance: 12,044; Referee: Koei Koya

17 March 2019 4	Sanfrecce Hiroshima	v	Matsumoto Yamaga
		Report

=== J. League Cup ===
==== Quarterfinals ====
Team 1	Agg.	Team 2	1st leg	2nd leg
Hokkaido Consadole Sapporo	4 - 3	Sanfrecce Hiroshima	3 - 2	1 - 1

=== Emperor's Cup ===
3 July 2019 Round 2	Sanfrecce Hiroshima	4 - 0	Okinawa SV	Fukuyama
18:30		Report		Stadium: Fukuyama Stadium

14 August 2019 Round 3	Sanfrecce Hiroshima	2 - 1	Zweigen Kanazawa	Hiroshima
19:00		Report		Stadium: Edion Stadium Hiroshima

18 September 2019 Round of 16	Sanfrecce Hiroshima	v	Oita Trinita	Hiroshima
19:00				Stadium: Edion Stadium Hiroshima

=== AFC Champions League ===
==== Group standings ====
Pos	Team	Pld	W	D	L	GF	GA	GD	Pts	Qualification	SAN	GZE	DAE	MVC
1	(Japan) Sanfrecce Hiroshima	6	5	0	1	9	4	+5	15	Advance to knockout stage	—	1–0	2–0	2–1
2	(China) Guangzhou Evergrande	6	3	1	2	9	5	+4	10	Advance to knockout stage	2–0	—	1–0	4–0
3	(South Korea) Daegu FC	6	3	0	3	10	6	+4	9		0–1	3–1	—	4–0
4	(Australia) Melbourne Victory	6	0	1	5	4	17	−13	1		1–3	1–1	1–3	—

Source: AFC
Rules for classification: Group stage tiebreakers

==== Results ====
5 March 2019 Group F	Guangzhou Evergrande (China)	2–0	(Japan) Sanfrecce Hiroshima	Tianhe Stadium, Guangzhou
20:00 UTC+8	Talisca 19'; Paulinho 26'	Live Report; Stats Report		Attendance: 48,216; Referee: Abdulrahman Al-Jassim (Qatar)

12 March 2019 Group F	Sanfrecce Hiroshima (Japan)	2–1	(Australia) Melbourne Victory	Hiroshima Big Arch, Hiroshima
19:00 UTC+9	Higashi 3'; Watari 86'	Live Report; Stats Report	Honda 71'	Attendance: 8,968; Referee: Ali Sabah (Iraq)

10 April 2019 Group F	Sanfrecce Hiroshima (Japan)	2 – 0	(South Korea) Daegu FC	Hiroshima Big Arch, Hiroshima
19:00 UTC+9	Douglas Vieira 10' (pen.); Watari 26'; Kawabe (yellow card) 29'; Minagawa (yellow card) 82' (yellow-red card) 89'	Live Report; Stats Report	Park Han-bin (yellow card) 7'; Kim Jin-hyuk (yellow card) 13'; Cesinha (yellow card) 68'	Attendance: 2,611; Referee: Ahmed Al-Ali (Jordan)

23 April 2019 Group F	Daegu FC (South Korea)	0 – 1	(Japan) Sanfrecce Hiroshima	DGB Daegu Bank Park, Daegu
20:00 UTC+9	Nishi (yellow card) 58'; Jeong Seung-won (yellow card) 82'	Live Report; Stats Report	Mizumoto (yellow card) 7'; Kawabe (yellow card) 20'; Araki 34'; Notsuda (yellow card) 90+3'	Attendance: 10,074; Referee: Mohd Amirul Izwan Yaacob (Malaysia)

8 May 2019 Group F	Sanfrecce Hiroshima (Japan)	1 – 0	(China) Guangzhou Evergrande	Hiroshima Big Arch, Hiroshima
19:00 UTC+9	Sasaki 15'; Higashi (yellow card) 60'; Morishima (yellow card) 83'	Live Report; Stats Report	Park Ji-soo (yellow card) 32'; Zhang Linpeng (yellow card) 55'; Gao Lin (yellow card) 62'	Attendance: 4,302; Referee: Alireza Faghani (Iran)

22 May 2019 Group F	Melbourne Victory (Australia)	1 – 3	(Japan) Sanfrecce Hiroshima	Melbourne Rectangular Stadium, Melbourne
20:00 UTC+10	Toivonen (yellow card) 8' (goal) 70'; Valeri (yellow card) 10'; Barbarouses (yellow card) 87'	Live Report; Stats Report	Matsumoto 5'; Mizumoto (yellow card) 28'; Minagawa 73'; Morishima 75'	Attendance: 6,053; Referee: (Saudi Arabia) Turki Al Khudair

18 June 2019 Last 16 First Leg	(Japan) Kashima Antlers	1 – 0	(Japan) Sanfrecce Hiroshima	Kashima Soccer Stadium, Kashima
19:00	Serginho 24'	Report	Inagaki (yellow card) 82' (yellow-red card) 86'	Attendance: 13,179; Referee: (Uzbekistan) Aziz Asimov

25 June 2019 Last 16 Second Leg	(Japan) Sanfrecce Hiroshima	3 – 2 (3 – 3 agg.)	(Japan) Kashima Antlers	Hiroshima Big Arch, Hiroshima
19:00	Araki (yellow card) 54'; Sasaki (yellow card) 65' (goal) 72'; Patric 66' 90+6' (pen.); Nakabayashi (red card) 74'; Douglas Vieira (yellow card) 80'; Kashiwa (yellow card) 82'	Report	Misao (yellow card) 27'; Doi 33' 89'; Nago (yellow card) 35'	Attendance: 4,279; Referee: (Iraq) Ali Sabah
