= Takaaki Shichi =

Japanese footballer (born 1993)

Takaaki Shichi 志知 孝明
Personal information
- Full name: Takaaki Shichi
- Date of birth: December 27, 1993 (age 32)
- Place of birth: Hashima, Gifu, Japan
- Height: 1.77 m (5 ft 9 1/2 in)
- Position: Defender

Team information
- Current team: Kyoto Sanga
- Number: 62

Youth career
- –2005: Masaki SSS
- 2006–2008: Hashima Junior High School
- 2009–2011: FC Gifu

College career
Years	Team	Apps	(Gls)
2012–2015	Tokai Gakuen University		

Senior career*
Years	Team	Apps	(Gls)
2015–2018	Matsumoto Yamaga	7	(0)
2017	→ Fukushima United FC (loan)	16	(0)
2019	Mito HollyHock	39	(5)
2020	Yokohama FC	22	(2)
2021–2022	Avispa Fukuoka	63	(1)
2023–2026	Sanfrecce Hiroshima	41	(1)
2025	→ Avispa Fukuoka (loan)	22	(0)
2026–	Kyoto Sanga	0	(0)
- * Club domestic league appearances and goals as of 15:11, 14 October 2026 (UTC)

Takaaki Shichi (志知 孝明, Shichi Takaaki; born December 27, 1993) is a Japanese footballer who plays as left-back for J1 League club Kyoto Sanga.

== Career ==
Takaaki Shichi joined J1 League club Matsumoto Yamaga FC in 2015. On May 20, he debuted in J.League Cup (v Shonan Bellmare).

== Club statistics ==
As of 14 October 2026.

Appearances and goals by club, season and competition
Club	Season	League			National cup (Note: Includes Emperor's Cup)		League cup (Note: Includes J.League Cup)		Continental		Total	
Club	Season	Division	Apps	Goals	Apps	Goals	Apps	Goals	Apps	Goals	Apps	Goals
Matsumoto Yamaga	2015	–			0	0	2	0	–		2	0
Matsumoto Yamaga	2017	J2 League	6	0	2	1	0	0	–		8	1
Matsumoto Yamaga	2018	J2 League	1	0	1	0	0	0	–		2	0
Matsumoto Yamaga	Total		7	0	3	1	2	0	0	0	12	1
Fukushima United (loan)	2017	J3 League	16	0	–		–		–		16	0
Mito HollyHock	2019	J2 League	39	5	0	0	–		–		39	5
Yokohama FC	2020	J1 League	22	2	–		3	0	–		25	2
Avispa Fukuoka	2021	J1 League	30	1	0	0	1	0	–		31	1
Avispa Fukuoka	2022	J1 League	33	0	1	0	6	0	–		40	0
Avispa Fukuoka	Total		63	1	1	0	7	0	0	0	71	1
Sanfrecce Hiroshima	2023	J1 League	23	1	2	0	4	0	0	0	29	1
Sanfrecce Hiroshima	2024	J1 League	11	0	1	0	2	0	5 (Note: Appearances in AFC Champions League Two)	0	19	0
Sanfrecce Hiroshima	2026	J1 (100)	6	0	–		–		3 (Note: Appearances in AFC Champions League Elite)	0	9	0
Sanfrecce Hiroshima	2026–27	J1 League	1	0	1	0	0	0	0	0	2	0
Sanfrecce Hiroshima	Total		41	1	4	0	6	0	8	0	59	1
Avispa Fukuoka (loan)	2025	J1 League	22	0	1	0	0	0	–		23	0
Kyoto Sanga	2026–27	J1 League	0	0	0	0	1	0	1	0	2	0
Career total			210	9	9	1	19	0	9	0	247	10
