= Tsukasa Morishima =

Japanese footballer

Tsukasa Morishima 森島 司
Personal information
- Full name: Tsukasa Morishima
- Date of birth: April 25, 1997 (age 29)
- Place of birth: Suzuka, Mie, Japan
- Height: 1.75 m (5 ft 9 in)
- Position: Attacking midfielder

Team information
- Current team: Nagoya Grampus
- Number: 14

Youth career
- 2013–2015: Yokkaichi Chuo Kogyo High School

Senior career*
Years	Team	Apps	(Gls)
2016–2023	Sanfrecce Hiroshima	153	(19)
2023–	Nagoya Grampus	97	(6)

International career^{‡}
2019–	Japan	4	(0)
Medal record
Sanfrecce Hiroshima
Runner-up	J1 League	2018
Men's football
Representing Japan
EAFF Championship
Winner	2022 Japan	Team
- * Club domestic league appearances and goals as of 12 August 2026 ‡ National team caps and goals as of 27 July 2022

Tsukasa Morishima (森島 司, Morishima Tsukasa; born April 25, 1997 in Mie) is a Japanese footballer who plays for Nagoya Grampus and the Japan national team.

== Career ==
Tsukasa Morishima joined J1 League club Sanfrecce Hiroshima in 2016. On May 4, he debuted in AFC Champions League (v FC Seoul).

== Club statistics ==
Updated to 11 April 2024.

Club performance			League		Cup		League Cup		Continental		Other		Total	
Season	Club	League	Apps	Goals	Apps	Goals	Apps	Goals	Apps	Goals	Apps	Goals	Apps	Goals
Japan			League		Emperor's Cup		J. League Cup		AFC		Other^{1}		Total	
2016	Sanfrecce Hiroshima	J1 League	0	0	0	0	0	0	1	0	0	0	0	0
2017	Sanfrecce Hiroshima	J1 League	14	0	2	0	6	0	–		–		22	0
2018	Sanfrecce Hiroshima	J1 League	1	0	0	0	6	0	–		–		7	0
2019	Sanfrecce Hiroshima	J1 League	24	3	1	0	0	0	7	1	–		32	4
2020	Sanfrecce Hiroshima	J1 League	34	5	–		2	0	–		–		36	5
2021	Sanfrecce Hiroshima	J1 League	29	1	1	0	5	0	–		–		35	1
2022	Sanfrecce Hiroshima	J1 League	31	8	5	1	11	2	–		–		47	11
2023	Sanfrecce Hiroshima	J1 League	20	2	2	1	4	0	–		–		26	3
2023	Nagoya Grampus	J1 League	12	0	0	0	4	0	–		–		16	0
2024	Nagoya Grampus	J1 League	7	2	0	0	0	0	–		–		7	2
Career total			172	21	11	2	38	2	8	1	0	0	229	26

^{1}Includes Japanese Super Cup.

== National team statistics ==
Japan national team
Year	Apps	Goals
2019	2	0
Total	2	0

== Honours ==
=== Club ===
Sanfrecce Hiroshima

- J.League Cup: 2022

Nagoya Grampus

- J.League Cup: 2024

=== International ===
- EAFF Championship: 2022
