= Bartosch Gaul =

German-Polish football manager (born 1987)

Personal information
- Date of birth: 5 October 1987 (age 39)
- Place of birth: Bytów, Poland

Team information
- Current team: Sanfrecce Hiroshima (manager)

Managerial career
- Years: Team
- 2010–2012: Schalke 04 (youth)
- 2015–2018: Mainz 05 (youth)
- 2018–2022: Mainz 05 II
- 2022–2023: Górnik Zabrze
- 2026–: Sanfrecce Hiroshima

Bartosch Gaul (born 5 October 1987) is a German-Polish professional football manager who is currently the manager of J1 League club Sanfrecce Hiroshima.

== Career ==
=== Youth teams of Schalke 04 ===
At the start of the 2008–09 season, Gaul became Dirk Reimöller's assistant coach in Schalke 04 U17s, a position he held until 2010. He then worked for two seasons as the head coach of the Schalke youth team, before becoming Norbert Elgert's assistant coach in the under-19 team in July 2012. In his last season in charge, the youth team led by Thilo Kehrer, who would go on to become a German international, won the German championship in the final against TSG 1899 Hoffenheim.

=== Youth teams of Mainz 05 ===
In July 2015, Gaul joined the youth department of Mainz 05 as a coach and a coordinator. At the start of the 2018–19 season, he was appointed as manager of Mainz 05 II, playing in Regionalliga Südwest. In four years, he oversaw the team in 135 games before leaving in June 2022.

=== Górnik Zabrze ===
On 23 June 2022, Gaul was announced as the new head coach of Polish Ekstraklasa club Górnik Zabrze. On 18 March 2023, one day after leading his team to a 3–2 comeback win against Wisła Płock, which promoted Górnik to the 14th spot in the league table, Gaul was replaced at his post by Górnik's previous manager Jan Urban.

=== RB Leipzig ===
On 1 February 2024, RB Leipzig announced that Gaul would be joining their academy staff as the head of performance division for teams from U15 to U19.

=== Sanfrecce Hiroshima ===
In December 2025, it was announced that Gaul would become manager of J1 League club Sanfrecce Hiroshima for the upcoming season.

== Personal life ==
Born in Bytów, Poland, Gaul has German and Polish citizenship.

== Managerial statistics ==
As of match played 11 March 2026

Managerial record by team and tenure
Team	Nat.	From	To	Record								Ref.
Team	Nat.	From	To	G	W	D	L	GF	GA	GD	Win %	Ref.
Mainz 05 II	(Germany)	6 June 2018	23 June 2022	135	54	26	55	197	192	+5	40.00	
Górnik Zabrze	(Poland)	23 June 2022	18 March 2023	28	9	8	11	38	42	−4	32.14	
Sanfrecce Hiroshima	(Japan)	1 January 2026	Present	8	4	2	2	13	11	+2	50.00	
Total				171	67	36	68	248	245	+3	39.18	
