= Hiroya Matsumoto (footballer) =

Japanese footballer

Hiroya Matsumoto 松本 大弥
Personal information
- Full name: Hiroya Matsumoto
- Date of birth: 10 August 2000 (age 26)
- Place of birth: Tokyo, Japan
- Height: 1.80 m (5 ft 11 in)
- Position: Defensive midfielder

Team information
- Current team: Shonan Bellmare
- Number: 5

Youth career
- Sekimae FC
- Yokogawa Musashino
- –2018: Sanfrecce Hiroshima

Senior career*
Years	Team	Apps	(Gls)
2019–2025	Sanfrecce Hiroshima	21	(0)
2021	→ Omiya Ardija (loan)	16	(0)
2022	→ Zweigen Kanazawa (loan)	34	(8)
2025–	Shonan Bellmare	28	(1)

International career^{‡}
2017	Japan U17	2	(0)
- * Club domestic league appearances and goals as of 14 August 2026 ‡ National team caps and goals as of 15:04, 4 June 2019 (UTC)

Hiroya Matsumoto (松本 大弥, Matsumoto Hiroya; born 10 August 2000) is a Japanese footballer who plays as a defensive midfielder for J1 League club Shonan Bellmare.

== Career statistics ==
=== Club ===
As of start of the 2025 season

Appearances and goals by club, season and competition
Club	Season	League			National Cup		League Cup		Continental		Total	
Club	Season	Division	Apps	Goals	Apps	Goals	Apps	Goals	Apps	Goals	Apps	Goals
Japan			League		Emperor's Cup		J.League Cup		AFC		Total	
Sanfrecce Hiroshima	2019	J1 League	4	0	3	1	0	0	4	0	11	1
Sanfrecce Hiroshima	2020	J1 League	7	0	0	0	0	0	—		7	0
Sanfrecce Hiroshima	2023	J1 League	3	0	2	1	2	0	—		7	1
Sanfrecce Hiroshima	2024	J1 League	3	0	1	0	0	0	5	1	9	1
Sanfrecce Hiroshima	Total		17	0	6	2	2	0	9	1	34	3
Omiya Ardija (loan)	2021	J2 League	16	0	1	0	—		—		17	0
Zweigen Kanazawa (loan)	2022	J2 League	34	8	1	0	—		—		35	8
Career total			67	8	8	2	2	0	9	1	86	11
