= Yudai Tanaka (footballer, born 1995) =

Japanese footballer

Yudai Tanaka 田中雄大

Personal information
- Full name: Yudai Tanaka
- Date of birth: November 17, 1995 (age 30)
- Place of birth: Natori, Miyagi, Japan
- Height: 1.87 m (6 ft 2 in)
- Position: Goalkeeper

Team information
- Current team: Sanfrecce Hiroshima
- Number: 21

Youth career
- 2002–2007: Fujigaoka Elementary School
- 2008–2010: AC Azzurri
- 2011–2013: Aomori Yamada High School

College career
Years	Team	Apps	(Gls)
2014–2017	Toin University of Yokohama		

Senior career*
Years	Team	Apps	(Gls)
2018–2019	SC Sagamihara	52	(0)
2020–2022	Blaublitz Akita	103	(0)
2023–	Sanfrecce Hiroshima	0	(0)
- * Club domestic league appearances and goals as of 22:50, 5 February 2023 (UTC)

Yudai Tanaka (田中 雄大, Tanaka Yūdai; born November 17, 1995) is a Japanese footballer who plays as a goalkeeper for J1 League club Sanfrecce Hiroshima.

== Career ==
After studying in Toin University of Yokohama, Tanaka joined the SC Sagamihara team in January 2018. He spent two seasons with the club and then moved to Blaublitz Akita for the 2020 season, helping them gain promotion to the J2 League. He went on to make over 100 appearances for Akita in three seasons at the club, before moving to J1 League team Sanfrecce Hiroshima for the 2023 season.

== Club statistics ==
Updated to 26 November 2022.

Club performance			League		Cup		Total	
Season	Club	League	Apps	Goals	Apps	Goals	Apps	Goals
Japan			League		Emperor's Cup		Total	
2015	TUY	-	0	0	1	0	1	0
2018	SC Sagamihara	J3 League	26	0	–		26	0
2019	SC Sagamihara	J3 League	26	0	–		26	0
2020	Blaublitz Akita	J3 League	32	0	2	0	34	0
2021	Blaublitz Akita	J2 League	38	0	0	0	38	0
2022	Blaublitz Akita	J2 League	33	0	0	0	33	0
Total			155	0	3	0	158	0

== Honours ==
Sanfrecce Hiroshima

- Japanese Super Cup: 2025

Blaublitz Akita

- J3 League (1): 2020

=== Individual ===
- Milk Soccer Academy Data Awards 2020 J3 MVP
