= Yōichi Naganuma =

Japanese-Filipino footballer

Yōichi Naganuma 長沼 洋一
Personal information
- Full name: Yōichi Naganuma
- Date of birth: 14 April 1997 (age 29)
- Place of birth: Kōfu, Japan
- Height: 1.78 m (5 ft 10 in)
- Position: Winger

Team information
- Current team: Urawa Red Diamonds
- Number: 88

Youth career
- 2005–2009: Satogaki SSS
- 2010–2012: U SC
- 2013–2015: Sanfrecce Hiroshima

Senior career*
Years	Team	Apps	(Gls)
2016–2022	Sanfrecce Hiroshima	18	(0)
2017	→ Montedio Yamagata (loan)	3	(0)
2018	→ FC Gifu (loan)	17	(0)
2019–2020	→ Ehime FC (loan)	72	(2)
2022–2024	Sagan Tosu	68	(15)
2024–	Urawa Red Diamonds	48	(1)

International career
2014	Japan U-17		
2015	Japan U-18		
2016	Japan U-19		
2018	Japan U-21	1	(0)
2017–2020	Japan U-23	6	(1)
Medal record
Representing Japan
Asian Games
Silver medal – second place	2018 Jakarta-Palembang	Team
AFC U-19 Championship
Gold medal – first place	2016 Bahrain
- * Club domestic league appearances and goals as of 31 October 2026, 10:00 (UTC)

Yōichi Naganuma (長沼 洋一, Naganuma Yōichi; born 14 April 1997) is a Japanese-Filipino professional footballer who plays as a winger for J1 League club, Urawa Red Diamonds.

== Career ==
Yōichi Naganuma joined J1 League club Sanfrecce Hiroshima in 2016. On 15 March 2017, he debuted in J.League Cup against Ventforet Kofu.

On 25 July 2022, Naganuma was announce official transfer to Sagan Tosu for mid 2022 season.

On 3 August 2024, Naganuma was announce official transfer to fellow J1 club, Urawa Red Diamonds for mid 2024 season.

== Personal life ==
Yōichi Naganuma Born in Kōfu, Yamanashi Prefecture, Japan, he has a Japanese father and a Filipino mother.

== Career statistics ==
=== Club ===
As of 31 October 2026.

Appearances and goals by club, season and competition
Club	Season	League			National cup		League cup		Continental		Other^{1}		Total	
Club	Season	Division	Apps	Goals	Apps	Goals	Apps	Goals	Apps	Goals	Apps	Goals	Apps	Goals
Japan			League		Emperor's Cup		J. League Cup		ACLE/ACL2		Other		Total	
Sanfrecce Hiroshima	2016	J1 League	0	0	0	0	0	0	–				0	0
Sanfrecce Hiroshima	2017	J1 League	0	0	1	0	6	1	–				7	1
Sanfrecce Hiroshima	2021	J1 League	15	0	1	0	6	1	–				22	1
Sanfrecce Hiroshima	2022	J1 League	3	0	1	0	3	0	–				7	0
Sanfrecce Hiroshima	Total		18	0	3	0	15	2	–				36	2
Montedio Yamagata (loan)	2017	J2 League	3	0	0	0	–						3	0
FC Gifu (loan)	2018	J2 League	17	0	0	0	–						17	0
Ehime FC (loan)	2019	J2 League	33	0	0	0	–						33	0
Ehime FC (loan)	2020	J2 League	39	2	0	0	–						39	2
Ehime FC (loan)	Total		72	2	0	0	–						72	2
Sagan Tosu	2022	J1 League	13	1	–								13	1
Sagan Tosu	2023	J1 League	32	10	0	0	3	0	–				35	10
Sagan Tosu	2024	J1 League	23	4	2	0	2	0	–				27	4
Sagan Tosu	Total		68	15	2	0	5	0	–				75	15
Urawa Red Diamonds	2024	J1 League	11	0	–								11	0
Urawa Red Diamonds	2025	J1 League	26	1	2	0	2	0	–		3	0	33	1
Urawa Red Diamonds	2026–27	J1 League	11	0	2	0	5	1	–				18	1
Urawa Red Diamonds	Total		48	1	4	0	7	1	0	0	3	0	62	2
Career total			206	18	9	0	27	3	0	0	3	0	245	21

^{1}Includes FIFA Club World Cup.
