= Keisuke Ōsako =

Japanese footballer

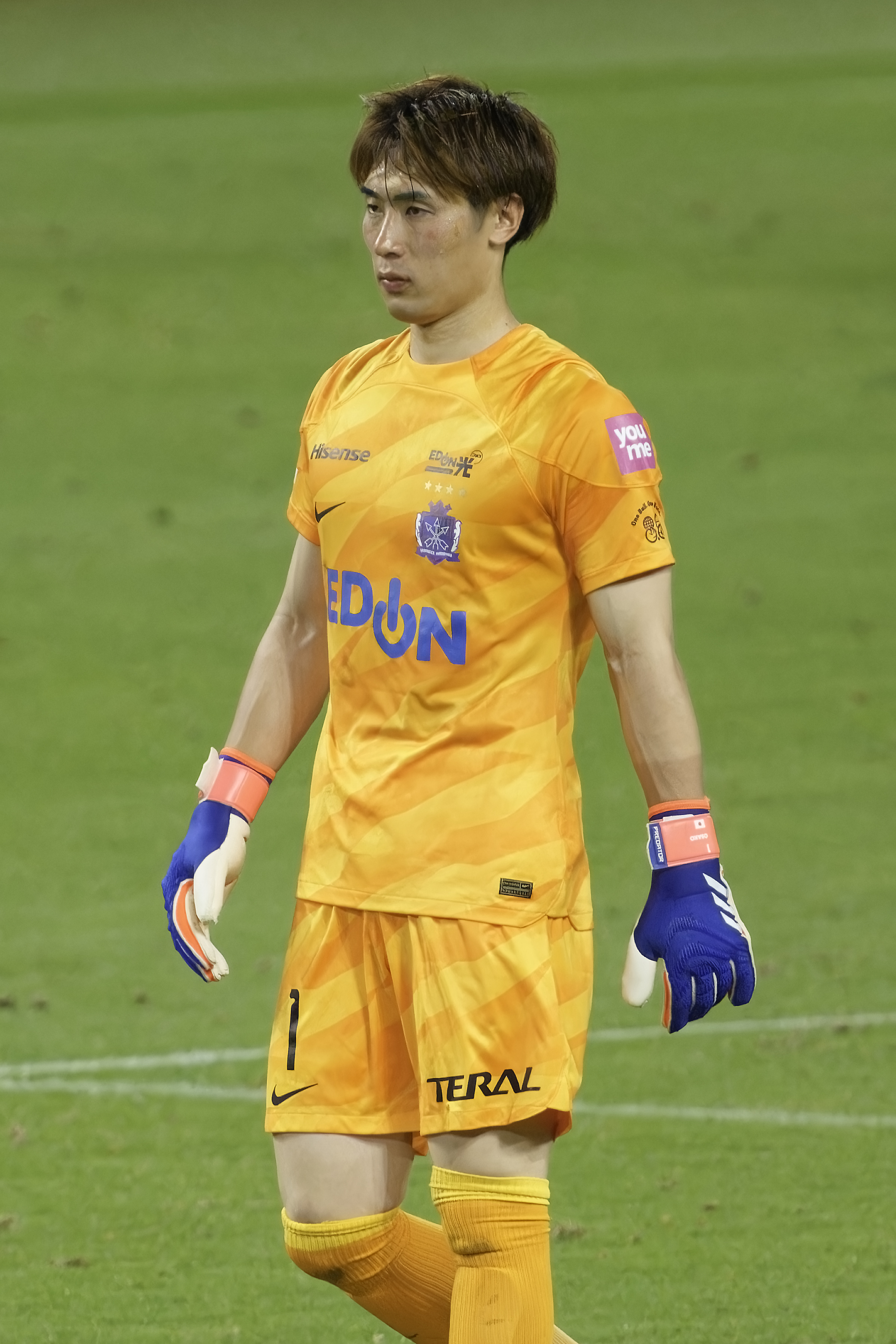
- Keisuke Ōsako playing for Sanfrecce Hiroshima in 2024.

Personal information
- Full name: Keisuke Ōsako
- Date of birth: 28 July 1999 (age 27)
- Place of birth: Izumi, Kagoshima Prefecture, Japan
- Height: 1.88 m (6 ft 2 in)
- Position: Goalkeeper

Team information
- Current team: Sanfrecce Hiroshima
- Number: 1

Youth career
- Euchi SSS
- –2014: Felicidod FC
- 2015–2017: Sanfrecce Hiroshima

Senior career*
Years	Team	Apps	(Gls)
2018–	Sanfrecce Hiroshima	225	(0)

International career^{‡}
2015–2017	Japan U18	4	(0)
2017–2019	Japan U20	5	(0)
2019–2021	Japan U23	7	(0)
2019–	Japan	11	(0)
Medal record
Sanfrecce Hiroshima
Runner-up	J1 League	2018
Men's football
Representing Japan
EAFF Championship
Winner	2022 Japan	Team
AFC U-19 Championship
Bronze medal – third place	2018 Indonesia
- * Club domestic league appearances and goals as of 23:26, 17 May 2026 (UTC) ‡ National team caps and goals as of 9 September 2025

Keisuke Ōsako (大迫 敬介, Ōsako Keisuke; born 28 July 1999) is a Japanese footballer who currently plays as a goalkeeper for J1 League club Sanfrecce Hiroshima and the Japan national team.

== International career ==
On May 24, 2019, Ōsako was called up by Japan's head coach Hajime Moriyasu to feature in the Copa América played in Brazil. He debuted on June 17, 2019, in the opening Copa game against Chile, as a starter.

On 15 May 2026, Ōsako was named in Japan's squad for the 2026 FIFA World Cup.

== Career statistics ==
=== Club ===
As of match played 17 May 2026

Appearances and goals by club, season and competition
Club	Season	League			National cup (Note: Includes Emperor's Cup)		League cup (Note: Includes J.League Cup)		Continental		Other		Total	
Club	Season	Division	Apps	Goals	Apps	Goals	Apps	Goals	Apps	Goals	Apps	Goals	Apps	Goals
Sanfrecce Hiroshima	2019	J1 League	29	0	1	0	0	0	4 (Note: Appearances in AFC Champions League Elite)	0	0	0	34	0
Sanfrecce Hiroshima	2020	J1 League	15	0	0	0	1	0	0	0	0	0	16	0
Sanfrecce Hiroshima	2021	J1 League	27	0	0	0	0	0	0	0	0	0	27	0
Sanfrecce Hiroshima	2022	J1 League	28	0	5	0	8	0	0	0	0	0	41	0
Sanfrecce Hiroshima	2023	J1 League	34	0	2	0	3	0	0	0	0	0	39	0
Sanfrecce Hiroshima	2024	J1 League	38	0	2	0	2	0	7 (Note: Appearances in AFC Champions League Two)	0	0	0	49	0
Sanfrecce Hiroshima	2025	J1 League	38	0	3	0	1	0	9	0	1 (Note: Appearance in Japanese Super Cup)	0	52	0
Sanfrecce Hiroshima	2026	J1 League	16	0	0	0	0	0	0	0	0	0	16	0
Sanfrecce Hiroshima	Total		225	0	13	0	15	0	20	0	1	0	274	0
Career total			225	0	13	0	15	0	20	0	1	0	274	0

=== International ===
As of match played 9 September 2025

Appearances and goals by national team and year
National team	Year	Apps	Goals
Japan
Japan	2019	2	0
Japan	2022	1	0
Japan	2023	4	0
Japan	2024	1	0
Japan	2025	3	0
Total		11	0

== Honours ==
=== Club ===
Sanfrecce Hiroshima

- J.League Cup: 2022, 2025
- Japanese Super Cup: 2025

=== International ===
- EAFF E-1 Football Championship: 2022, 2025

=== Individual ===
- J.League Best XI: 2024
- EAFF E-1 Football Championship Best Goalkeeper: 2025
