= Taishi Matsumoto =

Japanese footballer (born 1998)

Taishi Matsumoto 松本 泰志
Personal information
- Full name: Taishi Matsumoto
- Date of birth: 22 August 1998 (age 28)
- Place of birth: Higashimatsuyama, Saitama, Japan
- Height: 1.80 m (5 ft 11 in)
- Position: Defensive midfielder

Team information
- Current team: Sanfrecce Hiroshima
- Number: 14

Youth career
- –2010: Konan Minami SSS
- 2011–2013: Kumagaya SC
- 2014–2016: Shohei High School

Senior career*
Years	Team	Apps	(Gls)
2017–2024	Sanfrecce Hiroshima	104	(6)
2020	→ Avispa Fukuoka (loan)	25	(1)
2021	→ Cerezo Osaka (loan)	2	(0)
2025	Urawa Red Diamonds	29	(3)
2026–	Sanfrecce Hiroshima	19	(1)
Medal record
Sanfrecce Hiroshima
Runner-up	J1 League	2018
Representing Japan
Asian Games
Silver medal – second place	2018 Jakarta-Palembang	Team
- * Club domestic league appearances and goals as of 9 August 2026

Taishi Matsumoto (松本 泰志, Matsumoto Taishi; born 22 August 1998) is a Japanese professional footballer who plays as a defensive midfielder for J1 League club Sanfrecce Hiroshima.

== Career ==
Taishi Matsumoto joined J1 League club Sanfrecce Hiroshima in 2017.

== International career ==
On May 24, 2019, Matsumoto was called up by Japan's head coach Hajime Moriyasu to feature in the Copa América played in Brazil.

== Club statistics ==
As of 23 April 2026.

Appearances and goals by club, season and competition
Club	Season	League			National cup (Note: Includes Emperors Cup)		League cup (Note: Includes J.League Cup)		Continental		Other		Total	
Club	Season	Division	Apps	Goals	Apps	Goals	Apps	Goals	Apps	Goals	Apps	Goals	Apps	Goals
Sanfrecce Hiroshima	2017	J1 League	0	0	0	0	4	0	0	0	–		4	0
Sanfrecce Hiroshima	2018	J1 League	3	0	1	0	6	0	0	0	–		10	0
Sanfrecce Hiroshima	2019	J1 League	15	0	3	0	0	0	5 (Note: Appearances in AFC Champions League Elite)	1	–		23	1
Sanfrecce Hiroshima	2021	J1 League	10	0	0	0	0	0	0	0	–		10	0
Sanfrecce Hiroshima	2022	J1 League	23	3	5	2	10	0	0	0	–		38	5
Sanfrecce Hiroshima	2023	J1 League	17	0	1	1	4	0	0	0	–		22	1
Sanfrecce Hiroshima	2024	J1 League	36	3	4	0	6	1	3 (Note: Appearances in AFC Champions League Two)	0	–		49	4
Sanfrecce Hiroshima	Total		104	6	14	3	30	1	8	1	0	0	156	11
Avispa Fukuoka (loan)	2020	J2 League	25	1	–		–		–		–		25	1
Cerezo Osaka (loan)	2021	J1 League	2	0	–		–		2	2	–		4	2
Urawa Reds	2025	J1 League	29	3	2	0	2	0	–		3 (Note: Appearance in FIFA Club World Cup)	0	36	3
Sanfrecce Hiroshima	2026	J1 (100)	10	0	0	0	0	0	4	0	–		14	0
Career total			170	10	16	3	32	1	14	3	3	0	235	17

== Honours ==
=== Club ===
Sanfrecce Hiroshima

- J.League Cup: 2022
