= Motoki Ohara =

Japanese footballer

Motoki Ohara 小原 基樹
Personal information
- Date of birth: 9 March 2000 (age 26)
- Place of birth: Aichi, Japan
- Height: 1.70 m (5 ft 7 in)
- Position: Midfielder

Team information
- Current team: Júbilo Iwata (on loan from Sanfrecce Hiroshima)
- Number: 14

Youth career
- –2011: Mito SS
- 2012–2014: AS Laranja Toyokawa
- 2015–2017: Seiwa Gakuen High School

College career
Years	Team	Apps	(Gls)
2018–2021	Tokai Gakuen University		

Senior career*
Years	Team	Apps	(Gls)
2021–2022	Ehime FC	37	(5)
2023–	Sanfrecce Hiroshima	16	(0)
2023	→ Mito HollyHock (loan)	40	(6)
2025	→ Albirex Niigata (loan)	9	(0)
2026–	→ Júbilo Iwata (loan)	0	(0)
- * Club domestic league appearances and goals as of 14 August 2026

Motoki Ohara (小原 基樹, Ohara Motoki; born 9 March 2000) is a Japanese footballer currently playing as a midfielder for J1 League club Júbilo Iwata on loan from Sanfrecce Hiroshima.

== Career statistics ==
=== Club ===
As of 2 April 2026.

Appearances and goals by club, season and competition
Club	Season	League			National cup (Note: Includes Emperors Cup)		Continental		Total	
Club	Season	Division	Apps	Goals	Apps	Goals	Apps	Goals	Apps	Goals
Ehime FC	2021	J2 League	7	1	–		–		7	1
Ehime FC	2022	J3 League	30	4	–		–		30	4
Ehime FC	Total		37	5	0	0	0	0	37	5
Sanfrecce Hiroshima	2024	J1 League	8	0	1	3	0	0	9	3
Sanfrecce Hiroshima	2025	J1 League	2	0	1	0	1 (Note: Appearances in AFC Champions League Two)	0	4	0
Sanfrecce Hiroshima	2026	J1 (100)	4	0	0	0	3 (Note: Appearances in AFC Champions League Elite)	0	7	0
Sanfrecce Hiroshima	Total		14	0	2	3	4	0	20	3
Mito HollyHock (loan)	2023	J2 League	40	6	1	0	–		41	6
Albirex Niigata (loan)	2025	J1 League	9	0	–		–		9	0
Career total			100	11	3	3	4	0	107	14
