= Shunki Higashi =

Japanese association football player

Shunki Higashi 東 俊希
Personal information
- Full name: Shunki Higashi
- Date of birth: 28 July 2000 (age 26)
- Place of birth: Ōzu, Ehime, Japan
- Height: 1.80 m (5 ft 11 in)
- Positions: Left winger; left back

Team information
- Current team: Sanfrecce Hiroshima
- Number: 7

Youth career
- Kita SSS
- FC Zebra
- 2016–2018: Sanfrecce Hiroshima

Senior career*
Years	Team	Apps	(Gls)
2018–	Sanfrecce Hiroshima	224	(14)

International career
2018	Japan U19	3	(1)
2019–	Japan U20	3	(0)
Medal record
Sanfrecce Hiroshima
Runner-up	J1 League	2018
Representing Japan
AFC U-19 Championship
Bronze medal – third place	2018
- * Club domestic league appearances and goals as of 9 August 2026

Shunki Higashi (東 俊希, Higashi Shunki; born 28 July 2000) is a Japanese footballer who plays as a left winger or a left back for Sanfrecce Hiroshima.

== Playing career ==
Higashi was born in Ehime Prefecture. He joined J1 League club Sanfrecce Hiroshima from youth team in 2018. On 22 August, he debuted against Nagoya Grampus in Emperor's Cup.

== Career statistics ==
Last update: 30 July 2022

Club performance			League		Cup		League Cup		Continental		Total	
Season	Club	League	Apps	Goals	Apps	Goals	Apps	Goals	Apps	Goals	Apps	Goals
Japan			League		Emperor's Cup		League Cup		ACL		Total	
2018	Sanfrecce Hiroshima	J1 League	1	0	1	0	0	0	—		2	0
2019	Sanfrecce Hiroshima	J1 League	11	0	3	2	2	0	7	1	23	3
2020	Sanfrecce Hiroshima	J1 League	33	1	—		1	0	—		34	1
2021	Sanfrecce Hiroshima	J1 League	35	3	1	0	4	0	—		40	3
2022	Sanfrecce Hiroshima	J1 League	19	0	3	1	8	2	—		30	3
2023	Sanfrecce Hiroshima	J1 League	0	0	0	0	0	0	0	0	0	0
Career total			99	4	8	3	15	2	7	1	129	10

== Honours ==
=== Club ===
Sanfrecce Hiroshima

- J.League Cup: 2025

Individual

- J1 League Goal of the Month: February/March 2025,
