= Takumu Kawamura =

Japanese footballer

Takumu Kawamura 川村 拓夢
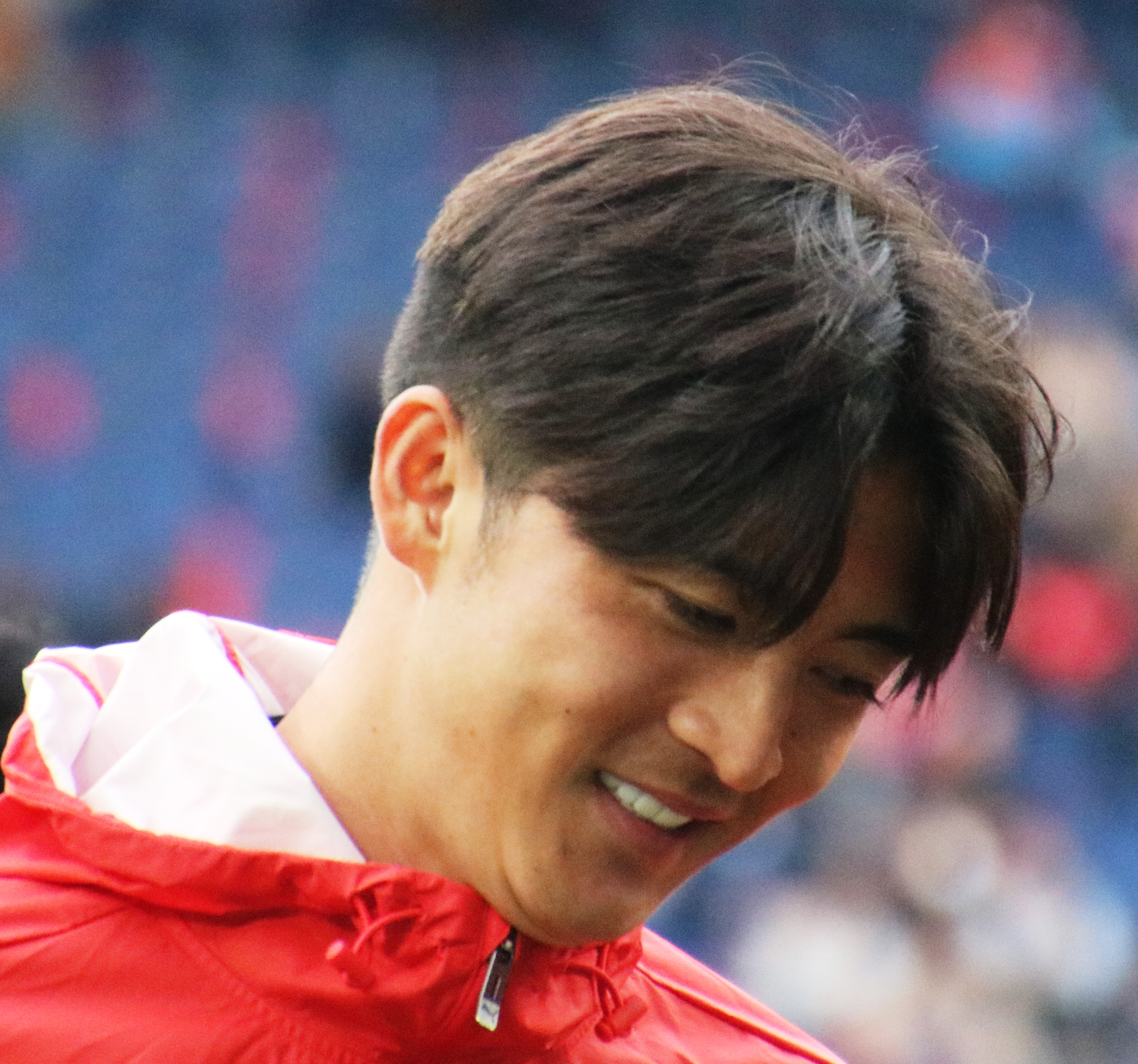
- Kawamura with FC Red Bull Salzburg in May 2025

Personal information
- Date of birth: 28 August 1999 (age 27)
- Place of birth: Asaminami Ward, Hiroshima, Hiroshima, Japan
- Height: 1.83 m (6 ft 0 in)
- Position: Midfielder

Team information
- Current team: Sanfrecce Hiroshima
- Number: 8

Youth career
- –2011: Hara SC
- 2012–2017: Sanfrecce Hiroshima

Senior career*
Years	Team	Apps	(Gls)
2018–2024	Sanfrecce Hiroshima	62	(8)
2019–2021	→ Ehime FC (loan)	77	(15)
2024–2026	Red Bull Salzburg	4	(0)
2026–	Sanfrecce Hiroshima	2	(1)

International career^{‡}
2024–	Japan	3	(1)
Medal record
Sanfrecce Hiroshima
Runner-up	J1 League	2018
Winner	J. League Cup	2022
- * Club domestic league appearances and goals as of 15 August 2026 ‡ National team caps and goals as of 11 June 2024

Takumu Kawamura (川村 拓夢, Kawamura Takumu; born 28 August 1999) is a Japanese professional footballer who plays as a midfielder for J1 League club Sanfrecce Hiroshima and the Japan national team.

== Club career ==
=== Sanfreece Hiroshima ===
Kawamura was born in Hiroshima Prefecture on 28 August 1999. He joined J1 League club Sanfrecce Hiroshima from youth team in 2018.

==== Ehime FC (loan) ====
He was loaned to J2 League club, Ehime FC for 2019 season. He left from the club after two years at Ehime.

After leaving the club, Kawamura return to Hiroshima for 2022 season. On 22 October 2022, Kawamura brought his club reach first title of J. League Cup after defeat Cerezo Osaka with dramatic score 2-1.

=== Red Bull Salzburg ===
On 24 June 2024, it was announced that Kawamura would join Austrian side Red Bull Salzburg on 1 July, signing a four-year contract in the process.

== International career ==
Kawamura made his debut for the senior Japan national team on 1 January 2024 in a friendly against Thailand and scored a goal in a 5–0 victory.

== Career statistics ==
=== Club ===
As of match played 24 May 2025.

Appearances and goals by club, season and competition
Club	Season	League			National cup (Note: Includes Emperor's Cup, Austrian Cup)		League cup (Note: Includes J.League Cup)		Continental		Other		Total	
Club	Season	Division	Apps	Goals	Apps	Goals	Apps	Goals	Apps	Goals	Apps	Goals	Apps	Goals
Sanfrecce Hiroshima	2018	J1 League	—		—		3	0	—		—		3	0
Sanfrecce Hiroshima	2022	J1 League	16	3	8	2	3	2	—		—		27	7
Sanfrecce Hiroshima	2023	J1 League	32	3	2	0	5	2	—		—		39	5
Sanfrecce Hiroshima	2024	J1 League	14	2	0	0	1	1	—		—		15	3
Sanfrecce Hiroshima	Total		62	8	10	2	12	5	—		—		84	15
Ehime FC (loan)	2019	J2 League	4	1	1	0	—		—		—		5	1
Ehime FC (loan)	2020	J2 League	39	6	—		—		—		—		39	6
Ehime FC (loan)	2021	J2 League	34	8	1	1	—		—		—		35	9
Ehime FC (loan)	Total		77	15	2	1	0	0	—		—		79	16
Red Bull Salzburg	2024–25	Austrian Bundesliga	4	0	1	0	—		3 (Note: Appearances in UEFA Champions League)	0	0	0	8	0
Career total			143	23	13	3	12	5	3	0	0	0	171	31

=== International ===
As of 11 June 2024

Appearances and goals by national team and year
National team	Year	Apps	Goals
Japan	2024	3	1
Total		3	1

Scores and results list Japan's goal tally first, score column indicates score after each Kawamura goal.

List of international goals scored by Takumu Kawamura
No.	Date	Venue	Opponent	Score	Result	Competition
1	1 January 2024	Japan National Stadium, Tokyo, Japan	Thailand	4–0	5–0	Friendly

== Honours ==
=== Club ===
Sanfrecce Hiroshima

- J.League Cup: 2022
