= Douglas Vieira (footballer) =

Brazilian footballer (born 1987)

Personal information
- Full name: Douglas da Silva Vieira
- Date of birth: 12 November 1987 (age 38)
- Place of birth: Brazil
- Height: 1.89 m (6 ft 2 1/2 in)
- Position: Striker

Senior career*
Years	Team	Apps	(Gls)
2009	Macaé		
2009	Sport		
2010	Santo Ângelo		
2010	Kalmar FF	13	(1)
2011	Juventus		
2011	EC São José		
2012	EC São Luiz	7	(4)
2012	União Frederiquense		
2012–2015	Juventude	39	(7)
2015	Náutico	34	(7)
2016–2018	Tokyo Verdy	108	(37)
2019–2024	Sanfrecce Hiroshima	133	(34)
- * Club domestic league appearances and goals as of 10 November 2024, 18:00 (UTC)

Douglas da Silva Vieira (born November 12, 1987) is a Brazilian professional footballer who plays as a striker, most recently for Sanfrecce Hiroshima.

== Career statistics ==
=== Club ===
As of match played 10 November 2024.

Appearances and goals by club, season and competition
Club	Season	League			State League		Cup		League Cup		Continental		Total	
Club	Season	Division	Apps	Goals	Apps	Goals	Apps	Goals	Apps	Goals	Apps	Goals	Apps	Goals
Kalmar FF	2010	Allsvenskan	13	1	—		0	0	—		2	0	15	1
EC São Luiz	2012	Gaúcho	—		13	4	—		—		—		13	4
Juventude	2012	Série D	2	0	—		—		—		—		2	0
Juventude	2013	Série D	14	1	2	0	—		—		—		16	1
Juventude	2014	Série C	9	0	14	4	—		—		—		23	4
Juventude	2015	Série C	—		13	3	—		—		—		13	3
Juventude	Total		24	1	29	7	—		—		—		53	8
Náutico	2015	Série B	32	6	—		2	1	—		—		34	7
Tokyo Verdy	2016	J2 League	28	6	—		2	1	—		—		30	7
Tokyo Verdy	2017	J2 League	41	18	—		1	0	—		—		42	18
Tokyo Verdy	2018	J2 League	39	13	—		2	0	—		—		41	13
Tokyo Verdy	Total		108	37	—		5	1	—		—		113	38
Sanfrecce Hiroshima	2019	J1 League	25	7	—		1	0	0	0	4	1	30	8
Sanfrecce Hiroshima	2020	J1 League	31	8	—		—		2	1	—		33	9
Sanfrecce Hiroshima	2021	J1 League	19	6	—		1	0	2	0	—		22	6
Sanfrecce Hiroshima	2022	J1 League	11	3	—		4	2	8	0	—		23	5
Sanfrecce Hiroshima	2023	J1 League	27	8	—		1	0	5	0	—		33	8
Sanfrecce Hiroshima	2024	J1 League	20	2	—		4	3	4	0	3	1	31	6
Sanfrecce Hiroshima	Total		133	34	—		11	5	21	1	7	2	172	42
Total			310	89	42	11	18	7	21	1	9	2	400	110
