= 2023 J1 League =

31st season of the J1 League

J1 League
- Season: 2023
- Dates: 17 February – 3 December 2023
- Champions: Vissel Kobe; 1st J1 title 1st Japanese title
- Relegated: Yokohama FC
- Champions League Elite: Vissel Kobe; Yokohama F. Marinos
- Champions League Two: Sanfrecce Hiroshima
- Matches: 306
- Goals: 777 (2.54 per match)
- Top goalscorer: Anderson Lopes; Yuya Osako (22 goals each)
- Biggest home win: Yokohama F. Marinos 5–0 Yokohama FC (8 April 2023)
- Biggest away win: Shonan Bellmare 0–6 Sagan Tosu (24 June 2023)
- Highest scoring: Kashiwa Reysol 4–5 Hokkaido Consadole Sapporo (3 June 2023)
- Longest winning run: 6 matches Yokohama F. Marinos
- Longest unbeaten run: 9 matches Albirex Niigata; Kashima Antlers; Nagoya Grampus; Urawa Red Diamonds
- Longest winless run: 15 matches Shonan Bellmare
- Longest losing run: 7 matches Gamba Osaka
- Highest attendance: 57,058; Nagoya Grampus 1–0 Albirex Niigata (5 August 2023)
- Lowest attendance: 3,935; Yokohama FC 0–3 Sanfrecce Hiroshima (15 April 2023)
- Total attendance: 5,811,987
- Average attendance: 18,993

The 2023 J1 League, also known as the 2023 Meiji Yasuda J1 League (Japanese: 2023 明治安田生命J1リーグ, Hepburn: 2023 Meiji Yasuda Seimei J1 Rīgu) for sponsorship reasons, was the 31st season of the J1 League, the top Japanese professional league for association football clubs, since its establishment in 1992. This was the ninth season of J1 League after being renamed from J. League Division 1.

Yokohama F. Marinos were the defending champions, having won their fifth J.League and seventh Japanese title previous season. Vissel Kobe won their first ever league title with one game to go.

== Overview ==
This season was the last as an 18 team-competition. At the end of season, only one club would be relegated to the J2 League as the number of clubs was expanded from 18 to 20 clubs from the 2024 season.

== Changes from the previous season ==
There were two teams relegated last season to the 2023 J2 League. Shimizu S-Pulse and Júbilo Iwata, both from Shizuoka Prefecture, were relegated due to them finishing 17th and 18th respectively the previous season. Thus, this was the first Japanese top-flight season to not feature any team from the region.

Kyoto Sanga finished on 16th place, but won the promotion/relegation playoffs against Roasso Kumamoto and thus retained their top league status. Had Roasso won, it would have been their first ever promotion to the top-flight.

Two teams were promoted from the 2022 J2 League: Albirex Niigata, who won the title and returned to J1 after a five-year absence, and Yokohama FC, who finished second, returning to the J1 after just a season playing on the J2 League.

== Participating clubs ==
Locations of the 2023 J1 League teams
2023 J1 League teams in Greater Tokyo Area
2023 J1 League teams in Keihanshin

Club	Location	Stadium	Capacity	Previous season rank
Hokkaido Consadole Sapporo	Hokkaido	Sapporo Dome	38,794	J1 (10th)
Kashima Antlers	Ibaraki Prefecture	Kashima Soccer Stadium	39,170	J1 (4th)
Urawa Red Diamonds	Saitama Prefecture	Saitama Stadium 2002	62,010	J1 (9th)
Kashiwa Reysol	Chiba Prefecture	Hitachi Kashiwa Stadium	15,109	J1 (7th)
FC Tokyo	Tokyo	Ajinomoto Stadium	47,851	J1 (6th)
Kawasaki Frontale	Kanagawa Prefecture	Todoroki Stadium	26,827	J1 (2nd)
Yokohama F. Marinos	Kanagawa Prefecture	Nissan Stadium	71,822	**J1 (1st)**
Yokohama FC	Kanagawa Prefecture	Mitsuzawa Stadium	15,444	J2 (2nd)
Shonan Bellmare	Kanagawa Prefecture	Lemon Gas Stadium Hiratsuka	15,380	J1 (12th)
Albirex Niigata	Niigata Prefecture	Denka Big Swan Stadium	41,684	J2 (1st)
Nagoya Grampus	Aichi Prefecture	Toyota Stadium	43,739	J1 (8th)
Kyoto Sanga	Kyoto Prefecture	Sanga Stadium by Kyocera	21,623	J1 (16th)
Gamba Osaka	Osaka Prefecture	Panasonic Stadium Suita	39,694	J1 (15th)
Cerezo Osaka	Osaka Prefecture	Yodoko Sakura Stadium	24,481	J1 (5th)
Vissel Kobe	Hyōgo Prefecture	Noevir Stadium	28,996	J1 (13th)
Sanfrecce Hiroshima	Hiroshima Prefecture	Edion Stadium	35,909	J1 (3rd)
Avispa Fukuoka	Fukuoka Prefecture	Best Denki Stadium	21,562	J1 (14th)
Sagan Tosu	Saga Prefecture	Ekimae Real Estate Stadium	24,130	J1 (11th)

=== Personnel and kits ===
Club	Manager	Captain	Kit manufacturer	Front shirt sponsor
Albirex Niigata	(Japan) Rikizo Matsuhashi	(Japan) Yuto Horigome	(Germany) Adidas	Kameda Seika
Avispa Fukuoka	(Japan) Shigetoshi Hasebe	(Japan) Tatsuki Nara	(Japan) Yonex	Shin Nihon Seiyaku
Cerezo Osaka	(Japan) Akio Kogiku	(Japan) Hiroshi Kiyotake	(Germany) Puma	Yanmar
FC Tokyo	(Australia) Peter Cklamovski	(Japan) Masato Morishige	(United States) New Balance	Mixi
Gamba Osaka	(Spain) Dani Poyatos	(Japan) Takashi Usami	(Denmark) Hummel	Panasonic
Hokkaido Consadole Sapporo	(Serbia) Mihailo Petrović	(Japan) Hiroki Miyazawa	(Japan) Mizuno	Ishiya
Kashima Antlers	(Japan) Daiki Iwamasa	(Japan) Shoma Doi	(United States) Nike	LIXIL
Kashiwa Reysol	(Japan) Masami Ihara	(Japan) Taiyo Koga	(Japan) Yonex	Hitachi
Kawasaki Frontale	(Japan) Toru Oniki	(Japan) Kento Tachibanada	(Germany) Puma	Fujitsu
Kyoto Sanga	(South Korea) Cho Kwi-jae	(Japan) Temma Matsuda	(Germany) Puma	Kyocera
Nagoya Grampus	(Japan) Kenta Hasegawa	(Japan) Sho Inagaki	(Japan) Mizuno	Toyota
Sagan Tosu	(Japan) Kenta Kawai	(Japan) Naoyuki Fujita	(United States) New Balance	Kimura Information Technology
Sanfrecce Hiroshima	(Germany) Michael Skibbe	(Japan) Sho Sasaki	(United States) Nike	EDION
Shonan Bellmare	(Japan) Satoshi Yamaguchi	(Japan) Kazuki Oiwa	(Brazil) Penalty	RiPTy
Urawa Red Diamonds	(Poland) Maciej Skorża	(Japan) Hiroki Sakai	(United States) Nike	Polus
Vissel Kobe	(Japan) Takayuki Yoshida	(Japan) Hotaru Yamaguchi	(Japan) Asics	Rakuten Mobile
Yokohama FC	(Japan) Shuhei Yomoda	(Brazil) Gabriel	(Germany) Puma	Onodera Group
Yokohama F. Marinos	(Australia) Kevin Muscat	(Japan) Takuya Kida	(Germany) Adidas	Nissan

=== Managerial changes ===
Team	Outgoing manager	Manner of departure	Date of vacancy	Position in the table	Incoming manager	Date of appointment
Urawa Red Diamonds	(Spain) Ricardo Rodríguez	Resigned	5 November 2022	Pre-season	(Poland) Maciej Skorża	10 November 2022
Gamba Osaka	(Japan) Hiroshi Matsuda	Resigned	23 November 2022	Pre-season	(Spain) Dani Poyatos	23 November 2022
Kashiwa Reysol	(Brazil) Nelsinho Baptista	Resigned	17 May 2023	16th	(Japan) Masami Ihara	17 May 2023
FC Tokyo	(Spain) Albert Puig	Resigned	14 June 2023	12th	(Japan) Takayoshi Amma	14 June 2023
FC Tokyo	(Japan) Takayoshi Amma	End of interim spell	16 June 2023	12th	(Australia) Peter Cklamovski	16 June 2023

=== Foreign players ===
From the 2021 season, there are no limitations on signing foreign players, but clubs can only register up to five of them for a single matchday squad. Players from J.League partner nations (Thailand, Vietnam, Morocco, Malaysia, Cambodia, Singapore, Indonesia, Saudi Arabia, Palestine, Argentina, Australia, Brazil, Tunisia, Egypt, and Qatar) were exempted from these restrictions.

- Players name in **bold** indicates the player is registered during the mid-season transfer window.
- Player's name in italics indicates the player has Japanese nationality in addition to their FIFA nationality, holds the nationality of a J.League partner nation, or is exempt from being treated as a foreign player due to having been born in Japan and being enrolled in, or having graduated from an approved type of school in the country.

Club	Player 1	Player 2	Player 3	Player 4	Player 5	Player 6	Player 7	Former player (s)
Albirex Niigata	(Australia) Thomas Deng	(Brazil) Danilo Gomes	(Brazil) Gustavo Nescau	(New Zealand) Michael Fitzgerald	(Peru) Kazuyoshi Shimabuku			
Avispa Fukuoka	(Brazil) Douglas Grolli	(Brazil) Lukian	(Brazil) Wellington					
Cerezo Osaka	(Belgium) Jordy Croux	(Brazil) Capixaba	(Brazil) Léo Ceará	(Croatia) Matej Jonjić	(South Korea) Kim Jin-hyeon	(South Korea) Yang Han-been		
FC Tokyo	(Brazil) Adaílton	(Brazil) Diego Oliveira	(Brazil) Henrique Trevisan	(Brazil) **Jajá Silva**	(Brazil) Pedro Perotti	(Poland) Jakub Słowik		(Brazil) Leandro
Gamba Osaka	(Brazil) Dawhan	(Brazil) Juan Alano	(China) Zhang Aolin	(Israel) Neta Lavi	(South Korea) Kwon Kyung-won	(Tunisia) Issam Jebali		
Hokkaido Consadole Sapporo	(Brazil) Lucas Fernandes	(South Korea) Kim Gun-hee	(Slovenia) Milan Tučić	(Thailand) Supachok Sarachat				(South Korea) Gu Sung-yun
Kashima Antlers	(Brazil) Arthur Caíke	(Brazil) Diego Pituca	(Nigeria) Blessing Eleke	(South Korea) Kwoun Sun-tae	(South Korea) Park Eui-jeong			(South Korea) Kim Min-tae
Kashiwa Reysol	(Brazil) Bueno	(Brazil) Diego	(Brazil) Douglas	(Brazil) Matheus Sávio	(Netherlands) Jay-Roy Grot			
Kawasaki Frontale	(Brazil) Jesiel	(Brazil) João Schmidt	(Brazil) Leandro Damião	(Brazil) Marcinho	(France) **Bafétimbi Gomis**	(South Korea) Jung Sung-ryong		(Thailand) Chanathip Songkrasin
Kyoto Sanga	(Brazil) Patric	(South Korea) **Gu Sung-yun**	(Suriname) Warner Hahn					(Brazil) Alan Cariús (Brazil) Paulinho Bóia (New Zealand) Michael Woud
Nagoya Grampus	(Australia) Mitchell Langerak	(Brazil) Thales	(Denmark) Kasper Junker					(Brazil) Mateus (Brazil) Naldinho
Sagan Tosu	(Kenya) Teddy Akumu	(South Korea) Hwang Seok-ho	(South Korea) Koh Bong-jo	(South Korea) Ueom Ye-hoon				
Sanfrecce Hiroshima	(Brazil) Douglas Vieira	(Brazil) Ezequiel	(Brazil) **Marcos Júnior**	(Cyprus) Pieros Sotiriou	(Switzerland) Nassim Ben Khalifa	(United States) Jelani Reshaun Sumiyoshi		
Shonan Bellmare	(Norway) Tarik Elyounoussi	(South Korea) **Kim Min-tae**	(South Korea) Song Bum-keun					(Nigeria) Mikel Agu
Urawa Red Diamonds	(Denmark) Alexander Scholz	(Guinea) José Kanté	(Netherlands) Alex Schalk	(Netherlands) Bryan Linssen	(Norway) Marius Høibråten	(Thailand) **Ekanit Panya**		(Sweden) David Moberg Karlsson
Vissel Kobe	(Brazil) Jean Patric	(Brazil) Lincoln	(Brazil) Matheus Thuler	(Brazil) Phelipe	(Hungary) **Bálint Vécsei**	(Spain) **Juan Mata**		(Montenegro) Stefan Mugoša (Spain) Andrés Iniesta (Spain) Sergi Samper
Yokohama FC	(Brazil) Gabriel	(Brazil) Marcelo Ryan	(Brazil) Mateus Moraes	(Brazil) Mauricio Caprini	(Brazil) Yuri Lara	(Germany) Svend Brodersen	(Vietnam) Nguyễn Công Phượng	(Brazil) Saulo Mineiro
Yokohama F. Marinos	(Brazil) Anderson Lopes	(Brazil) Eduardo	(Brazil) Élber	(Brazil) Yan Matheus	(South Korea) **Nam Tae-hee**			(Brazil) Marcos Júnior

== League table ==
Pos	Team	Pld	W	D	L	GF	GA	GD	Pts	Qualification or relegation
1	Vissel Kobe (C)	34	21	8	5	60	29	+31	71	Qualification for the AFC Champions League Elite league stage
2	Yokohama F. Marinos	34	19	7	8	63	40	+23	64	Qualification for the AFC Champions League Elite league stage
3	Sanfrecce Hiroshima	34	17	7	10	42	28	+14	58	Qualification for the AFC Champions League Two group stage
4	Urawa Red Diamonds	34	15	12	7	42	27	+15	57	
5	Kashima Antlers	34	14	10	10	43	34	+9	52	
6	Nagoya Grampus	34	14	10	10	41	36	+5	52	
7	Avispa Fukuoka	34	15	6	13	37	43	−6	51	
8	Kawasaki Frontale	34	14	8	12	51	45	+6	50	Qualification for the AFC Champions League Elite league stage (Note: Qualified as the 2023 Emperor's Cup winners.)
9	Cerezo Osaka	34	15	4	15	39	34	+5	49	
10	Albirex Niigata	34	11	12	11	36	40	−4	45	
11	FC Tokyo	34	12	7	15	42	46	−4	43	
12	Hokkaido Consadole Sapporo	34	10	10	14	56	61	−5	40	
13	Kyoto Sanga	34	12	4	18	40	45	−5	40	
14	Sagan Tosu	34	9	11	14	43	47	−4	38	
15	Shonan Bellmare	34	8	10	16	40	56	−16	34	
16	Gamba Osaka	34	9	7	18	38	61	−23	34	
17	Kashiwa Reysol	34	6	15	13	33	47	−14	33	
18	Yokohama FC (R)	34	7	8	19	31	58	−27	29	Relegation to the J2 League

Source: JLeague.jp, J.League Data Site
Rules for classification: 1) Points; 2) Goal difference; 3) Goals scored; 4) Head-to-head points; 5) Head-to-head goal difference; 6) Head-to-head goals scored; 7) Fewer disciplinary points.
(C) Champions; (R) Relegated

== Results table ==
Home \ Away	ALB	ANT	AVI	BEL	CER	CON	GAM	GRA	KWF	KSA	RED	REY	SAG	SFR	TOK	VIS	YFC	YFM
Albirex Niigata	—	0–2	3–2	2–2	1–0	2–2	1–3	1–3	1–0	1–3	1–1	0–0	1–1	2–0	0–0	0–1	3–1	2–1
Kashima Antlers	2–0	—	0–0	1–0	1–0	3–0	4–0	2–0	1–2	0–0	0–0	1–1	2–1	1–2	1–1	1–5	2–1	1–2
Avispa Fukuoka	0–1	0–0	—	2–1	2–1	2–1	1–2	1–0	1–3	2–1	0–0	1–0	0–0	0–1	1–0	0–3	2–0	0–4
Shonan Bellmare	2–2	2–2	0–1	—	0–2	2–4	4–1	2–1	0–2	0–2	0–1	1–2	0–6	1–0	0–1	1–1	2–2	1–1
Cerezo Osaka	2–2	0–1	0–1	0–2	—	2–3	1–0	3–1	3–0	0–1	2–0	1–0	2–1	0–1	0–1	2–1	2–0	2–1
Hokkaido Consadole Sapporo	0–1	0–1	2–2	0–1	1–4	—	4–0	1–2	3–4	2–1	0–2	1–2	1–1	0–0	5–1	1–3	2–1	2–0
Gamba Osaka	1–1	2–1	1–2	2–1	1–2	2–2	—	0–1	2–0	1–0	1–3	3–1	1–1	0–1	3–1	0–1	1–1	0–2
Nagoya Grampus	1–0	1–0	2–1	2–2	3–1	1–1	1–0	—	2–0	1–0	0–0	1–1	1–1	2–1	0–0	2–2	1–1	2–2
Kawasaki Frontale	2–3	3–0	4–2	1–1	0–0	2–2	3–4	1–2	—	3–3	1–1	2–0	1–0	1–0	1–0	0–1	3–0	1–2
Kyoto Sanga	0–1	0–2	2–0	0–1	0–1	3–0	2–1	2–1	0–1	—	0–2	0–1	2–3	1–0	2–0	0–3	2–1	3–1
Urawa Red Diamonds	2–1	0–0	2–3	4–1	2–1	4–1	3–1	1–0	1–1	0–0	—	2–0	0–2	2–1	0–0	1–2	1–1	0–0
Kashiwa Reysol	0–0	1–0	1–3	1–1	1–1	4–5	2–2	0–3	1–1	1–1	0–3	—	2–2	0–0	1–1	1–1	0–1	2–0
Sagan Tosu	2–0	2–2	0–1	1–5	2–1	1–1	1–1	1–0	0–1	3–2	1–2	1–1	—	0–2	1–0	0–1	1–3	1–3
Sanfrecce Hiroshima	1–2	1–1	3–1	1–0	0–0	0–0	3–0	3–1	3–2	3–1	2–1	1–0	1–0	—	1–2	2–0	1–1	0–1
FC Tokyo	2–1	1–3	1–2	2–2	1–2	1–3	3–0	2–0	2–1	2–0	2–0	1–0	3–2	1–2	—	2–2	3–1	2–3
Vissel Kobe	0–0	3–1	1–0	2–0	1–0	1–1	4–0	2–1	2–2	2–1	0–1	1–1	2–1	2–0	3–2	—	3–0	2–3
Yokohama FC	1–0	1–3	1–1	0–1	0–1	1–4	0–0	0–1	2–1	1–4	0–0	1–2	1–2	0–3	1–0	2–0	—	4–1
Yokohama F. Marinos	0–0	2–1	2–0	4–1	2–0	4–1	2–1	1–1	0–1	4–1	2–0	4–3	1–1	1–1	2–1	0–2	5–0	—

Source: J1 League
Legend: Blue = home team win; Yellow = draw; Red = away team win.

== Season statistics ==
=== Top scorers ===
Rank	Player	Club	Goals
1	(Brazil) Anderson Lopes	Yokohama F. Marinos	22
1	(Japan) Yuya Osako	Vissel Kobe	22
3	(Denmark) Kasper Junker	Nagoya Grampus	16
4	(Brazil) Diego Oliveira	FC Tokyo	15
5	(Japan) Mao Hosoya	Kashiwa Reysol	14
5	(Japan) Yuma Suzuki	Kashima Antlers	14
7	(Japan) Yuki Ohashi	Shonan Bellmare	13
8	(Japan) Yuya Asano	Hokkaido Consadole Sapporo	12
9	(Brazil) Léo Ceará	Cerezo Osaka	11
10	(Brazil) Patric	Kyoto Sanga	10
10	(Japan) Yoichi Naganuma	Sagan Tosu	10
10	(Japan) Yoshinori Muto	Vissel Kobe	10
10	(Japan) Yuta Toyokawa	Kyoto Sanga	10
10	(Japan) Yuya Yamagishi	Avispa Fukuoka	10

=== Hat-tricks ===
Player	For	Against	Result	Date	Ref.
(Japan) Yuki Ohashi	Shonan Bellmare	Sagan Tosu	5–1 (A)	18 February 2023	
(Japan) Shuto Machino^{4}	Shonan Bellmare	Gamba Osaka	4–1 (H)	1 April 2023	
(Japan) Ryotaro Ito	Albirex Niigata	Avispa Fukuoka	3–2 (H)	15 April 2023	
(Japan) Yuji Ono	Sagan Tosu	Shonan Bellmare	6–0 (A)	24 June 2023	

Notes

- ^{4} Player scored 4 goals
- (H) – Home team
- (A) – Away team

=== Top assists ===
Rank	Player	Club	Assists
1	(Brazil) Élber	Yokohama F. Marinos	11
1	(Brazil) Yan Matheus	Yokohama F. Marinos	11
3	(Brazil) Matheus Sávio	Kashiwa Reysol	10
3	(Japan) Yoshinori Muto	Vissel Kobe	10
3	(Japan) Yuta Higuchi	Kashima Antlers	10
6	(Japan) Ryo Hatsuse	Vissel Kobe	8
6	(Japan) Yuya Osako	Vissel Kobe	8
8	(Japan) Kota Mizunuma	Yokohama F. Marinos	7
9	(Brazil) Adaílton	FC Tokyo	6
9	(Japan) Yasuto Wakizaka	Kawasaki Frontale	6

=== Clean sheets ===
Rank	Player	Club	Clean sheets
1	(Japan) Shusaku Nishikawa	Urawa Red Diamonds	15
1	(Japan) Tomoki Hayakawa	Kashima Antlers	15
3	(Japan) Daiya Maekawa	Vissel Kobe	14
4	(Japan) Keisuke Osako	Sanfrecce Hiroshima	13
5	(Australia) Mitchell Langerak	Nagoya Grampus	10
5	(Japan) Masaaki Murakami	Avispa Fukuoka	10
5	(Japan) Ryosuke Kojima	Albirex Niigata	10
8	(South Korea) Kim Jin-hyeon	Cerezo Osaka	7
9	(Japan) Jun Ichimori	Yokohama F. Marinos	6
9	(Japan) Kenta Matsumoto	Kashiwa Reysol	6
9	(Poland) Jakub Słowik	FC Tokyo	6
9	(South Korea) Jung Sung-ryong	Kawasaki Frontale	6
9	(South Korea) Park Il-gyu	Sagan Tosu	6

=== Discipline ===
==== Player ====
- Most yellow cards: 10
  - (Japan) Takuma Arano (Hokkaido Consadole Sapporo)
- Most red cards: 2
  - (Brazil) Diego Pituca (Kashima Antlers)
  - (Guinea) José Kanté (Urawa Red Diamonds)
  - (Japan) Hisashi Appiah Tawiah (Kyoto Sanga)
  - (Japan) Yoichi Naganuma (Sagan Tosu)
  - (Japan) Yugo Tatsuta (Kashiwa Reysol)

==== Club ====
- Most yellow cards: 64
  - FC Tokyo
- Most red cards: 6
  - Kawasaki Frontale

== Awards ==
=== Monthly awards ===
Month	Manager of the Month		Monthly MVP		Goal of the Month		References
Month	Manager	Club	Player	Club	Player	Club	References
February/March	(Japan) Takayuki Yoshida	Vissel Kobe	(Japan) Ryotaro Ito	Albirex Niigata	(Japan) Ryonosuke Kabayama	Sagan Tosu	
April	(Germany) Michael Skibbe	Sanfrecce Hiroshima	(Brazil) Douglas Vieira	Sanfrecce Hiroshima	(Japan) Ryoma Watanabe	FC Tokyo	
May	(Japan) Shuhei Yomoda	Yokohama FC	(Japan) Yuya Osako	Vissel Kobe	(Japan) Shunsuke Mito	Albirex Niigata	
June	(Spain) Dani Poyatos	Gamba Osaka	(Japan) Yoshinori Muto	Vissel Kobe	(Japan) Takumu Kawamura	Sanfrecce Hiroshima	
July	(Japan) Shigetoshi Hasebe	Avispa Fukuoka	(Japan) Yuya Osako	Vissel Kobe	(Japan) Ken Iwao	Urawa Red Diamonds	
August	(Japan) Daiki Iwamasa	Kashima Antlers	(Japan) Yuta Higuchi	Kashima Antlers	(Brazil) Marcos Júnior	Sanfrecce Hiroshima	
September	(Japan) Shigetoshi Hasebe	Avispa Fukuoka	(Japan) Kazuya Konno	Avispa Fukuoka	(Japan) Shunsuke Mito	Albirex Niigata	
October	(Japan) Satoshi Yamaguchi	Shonan Bellmare	(Japan) Daiki Tomii	Shonan Bellmare	(Japan) Kota Tawaratsumida	FC Tokyo	
November/December	(Japan) Takayuki Yoshida	Vissel Kobe	(Japan) Yuya Osako	Vissel Kobe	(Japan) Yuta Toyokawa	Kyoto Sanga	

=== Annual awards ===
Award	Winner	Club
Manager of the Year	(Japan) Shigetoshi Hasebe	Avispa Fukuoka
Player of the Year	(Japan) Yuya Osako	Vissel Kobe
Best Young Player	(Japan) Shunsuke Mito	Albirex Niigata
Goal of the Year	(Japan) Ryoma Watanabe	FC Tokyo

Best XI
Goalkeeper	(Japan) Shusaku Nishikawa (Urawa Red Diamonds)			
Defenders	(Denmark) Alexander Scholz (Urawa Red Diamonds)	(Norway) Marius Høibråten (Urawa Red Diamonds)	(Japan) Seiya Maikuma (Cerezo Osaka)	(Japan) Gotoku Sakai (Vissel Kobe)
Midfielders	(Japan) Atsuki Ito (Urawa Red Diamonds)		(Japan) Yasuto Wakizaka (Kawasaki Frontale)	(Japan) Hotaru Yamaguchi (Vissel Kobe)
Forwards	(Brazil) Anderson Lopes (Yokohama F. Marinos)		(Japan) Yuya Osako (Vissel Kobe)	(Japan) Yoshinori Muto (Vissel Kobe)

== See also ==
- 2023 Avispa Fukuoka season
- 2023 Gamba Osaka season
- 2023 Kashima Antlers season
- 2023 Kawasaki Frontale season
- 2023 Nagoya Grampus season
- 2023 Sanfrecce Hiroshima season
- 2023 Urawa Red Diamonds season
- 2023 Vissel Kobe season
- 2023 Yokohama FC season
- 2023 Yokohama F. Marinos season
