= Sanfrecce Hiroshima =

Japanese football club

Sanfrecce Hiroshima サンフレッチェ広島
- Full name: Sanfrecce Hiroshima Football Club
- Nicknames: Sanfrecce, Sanfre, La Viola
- Short name: HIR
- Founded: 1938; 88 years ago as Toyo-Kogyo SC; 1992; 34 years ago as Sanfrecce Hiroshima
- Ground: Edion Peace Wing Hiroshima
- Capacity: 28,520
- Owner(s): EDION; Mazda
- Chairman: Shingo Senda
- Manager: Bartosch Gaul
- League: J1 League
- 2026: J1 League, 7th of 20
- Website: www.sanfrecce.co.jp
Home colours	Away colours

Sanfrecce Hiroshima (Japanese: サンフレッチェ広島, romanized: Sanfurecche Hiroshima; Italian pronunciation: [saɱˌfrettʃe]) is a Japanese professional football club based in Hiroshima. The club competes in the J1 League, top flight of the Japanese football league system. Sanfrecce is one of the most successful clubs in Japan. The club is the joint fourth in most J1 League titles with three, the joint first in most top-flight titles (which includes the defunct Japan Soccer League), with eight, and the club with the most participations in Emperor's Cup finals, with 15.

Sanfrecce have won 3 J1 League, 1 J2 League, 3 Emperor's Cup, 1 J.League Cup and 4 Japanese Super Cup titles. Internationally, the club has made two appearances in the FIFA Club World Cup, with their most recent appearance being in the 2015 edition.

== History ==
=== 1938–1991 ===
The club was a former company team of Toyo Kogyo, Toyo Kogyo Soccer Club (東洋工業サッカー部) in 1938 and played in the semi-professional Japan Soccer League.

The club was an original founder ("Original Eight" (Note: The Original Eight of the Japan Soccer League (JSL) in 1965 were Mitsubishi, Furukawa, Hitachi, Yanmar, Toyo Industries, Yahata Steel, Toyota Industries and Nagoya Mutual Bank.)) of the now-disbanded Japan Soccer League (JSL) in 1965. They dominated the JSL's early years, winning the title 4 times in a row – a feat that was later equaled by Yomiuri SC/Verdy Kawasaki. The name change was made at Mazda SC (マツダSC) in 1981.

During the 1969 season, they participated in the 1969 Asian Club Championship, forerunner to today's AFC Champions League; at the time, the tournament was done in a single locale (in that year it was Bangkok, Thailand), and they ended up in third place, the first participation of a Japanese club in the continental tournament. This also cost them the league title to Mitsubishi/Urawa, and although they won another title in 1970, since then the club has been out of the running for the title, with exceptional seasons such as 1994 when they won runner-up.

The Toyo Industries that became the first JSL champions also completed the first double by taking the Emperor's Cup. They were also the first of three "Invincibles", undefeated champion clubs in Japan (the others were Mitsubishi in 1969 and Yamaha in 1987–88), although only Toyo completed a double.

Ogi Matsumoto and Yasuyuki Kuwahara went on to win the 1968 Olympic bronze medal for the Japan national team.

=== 1992–present ===
When JSL disbanded and became the J.League in 1992, it dropped the company name and became Sanfrecce Hiroshima. Alongside JEF United Ichihara Chiba and Urawa Red Diamonds they co-founded both leagues ("Original Ten" (Note: The Original Ten of the J.League in 1992 were Kashima Antlers, Urawa Red Diamonds, JEF United Ichihara, Verdy Kawasaki, Yokohama Marinos, Yokohama Flügels, Shimizu S-Pulse, Nagoya Grampus Eight, Gamba Osaka and Sanfrecce Hiroshima.)).

=== First league title ===
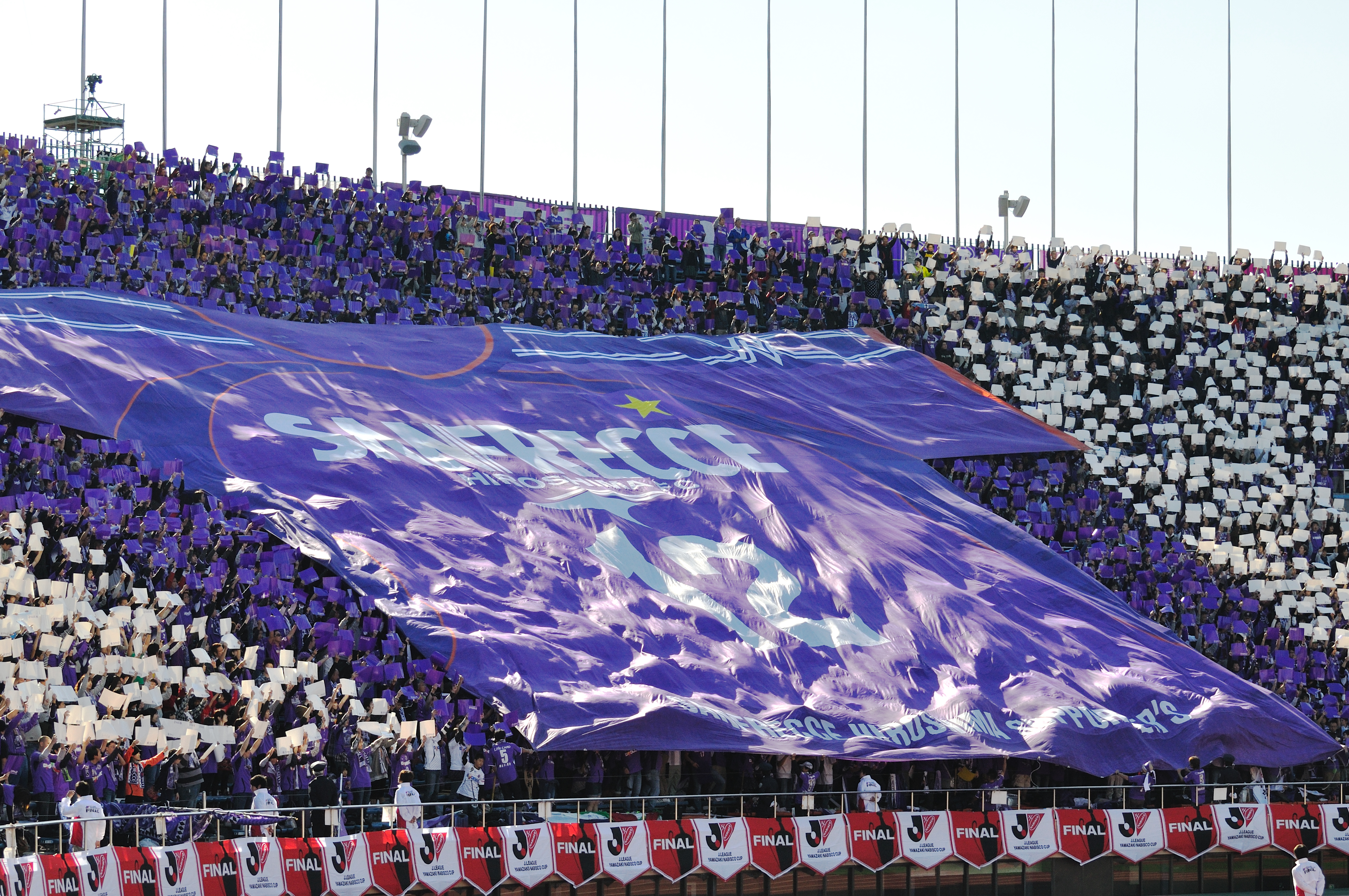
Sanfreece Hiroshima fans

In 2002, Sanfrecce became the first former stage winner (first stage, 1994) to be relegated to the lower division, J2 League. But it only spent a year there, finishing second the very next season to regain promotion back to J1. The club finished 16th in the 2007 season and were relegated to J2 League after they were beaten by Kyoto Sanga in the promotion/relegation play-off. In the following season in 2008, Sanfrecce nevertheless won the J2 League title at the first attempt, having 84 points (a difference of 25 points with the runner-up clubs) with six matches left.

By virtue of earning fourth place in the 2009 season and Gamba Osaka retaining the Emperor's Cup, Sanfrecce qualified for the 2010 AFC Champions League where they were knocked out in the group stage.

=== Back-to-back league title ===
On 24 November 2012, Sanfrecce defeated Cerezo Osaka 4–1 to seal their first ever J1 league title with 64 points thus qualifying to the 2012 FIFA Club World Cup as host and also qualifying to the 2013 AFC Champions League. Three individual awards was given individually with Hajime Moriyasu winning the 'Manager of the Year' award and Hisato Satō winning both the 'Most Valuable Player' award and the 'Top Scorer' award with 22 goals. Sanfreece players Shusaku Nishikawa, Hiroki Mizumoto, Toshihiro Aoyama, Yojiro Takahagi and Hisato Satō was included in the 2012 'Best Eleven' of the season. Sanfreece then played in the FIFA Club World Cup play-off in December where Toshihiro Aoyama scored the only goal against OFC Champions League winners Auckland City to send the team to the quarter-finals. However, Sanfreece suffered a 2–1 defeat to CAF Champions League winners Al Ahly thus failing to qualified to the semi-finals and having the need to play for a 5th place where Sanfreece face AFC Champions League winners Ulsan Hyundai where the team won 3–2.

Sanfrecce then started off the 2013 season in the Japanese Super Cup on 23 February 2013 against 2012 Emperor's Cup winners Kashiwa Reysol. where Hisato Satō scored the only goal in the match to lift the cup. However, in the 2013 AFC Champions League, Sanfrecce suffered a rock bottom group stage finished with only 3 points thus being knock out. On 7 December 2013, Sanfrecce defeated Kashima Antlers 2–0, securing their second J1 League title with 63 points following a thrilling finish to the season which saw first-place Yokohama F. Marinos losing their final league game ending with 62 points, handing Sanfrecce the title. With their second consecutive title win, Sanfrecce became the second club to successfully defend their crown since Kashima Antlers in 2009. Sanfreecce then qualified to the 2014 AFC Champions League.

Sanfrecce started off the 2014 season on 22 February 2014 during the Japanese Super Cup against 2013 Emperor's Cup winners Yokohama F. Marinos where Gakuto Notsuda and Takuma Asano went on to score the goal to secure a 2–0 win. In the 2014 AFC Champions League, Sanfrecce finished as runners-up in the group stage thus seeing the club advance to the round of 16 for the first time in the club history. Sanfreecce was drawn against Australian club Western Sydney Wanderers where the match ended up in a 3–3 aggerate however, due to away goal rules, the club was knocked out to the eventual cup winners.

During the 2015 season proved to be a great year for Sanfrecce, finishing 1st in the 2nd half of the season, then finishing 1st overall, just 2 points above Urawa Red Diamonds, to win their third J1 League title thus qualifying and representing Japan in that year's FIFA Club World Cup. The club started off playing in the play-off round where they won against OFC Champions League winners Auckland City 2–0 thus qualifying to the quarter-finals facing off against CAF Champions League winners TP Mazembe where Sanfrecce won them 3–0 advancing to the semi-finals to play against the Copa Libertadores winners River Plate. The club ended up losing the match 1–0 where they would ended up playing for a 3rd placing match against Chinese side Guanzhou Evergrande where Sanfrecce won 2–1 to finished in third place.

=== After the three-year reign ===
In the 2018 season, after Sanfrecce progressively trailing towards a J1 League title, as it led the standings after Round 5, the club fell down to 2nd-place at the end of the season. The club saw Kawasaki Frontale win the league as Sanfrecce lost four of their last five league matches.

In 2022, Sanfrecce was relieved to experience another good season, under the management of newly appointed German coach Michael Skibbe. Underrated by many because of the previous season, the club fought for the title at every competition it played until the very end. The Violas finished 3rd place at the J1 League, as runners-up to J2 club Ventforet Kofu in the Emperor's Cup final, and as J.League Cup champions. The J.League Cup was won in dramatic fashion against Cerezo Osaka, as the club managed to comeback from a 1–0 loss with two goals scored by mid-season Cypriot signing Pieros Sotiriou. Both goals came very late in the match, being scored at the 96th and 101st minute of the match, during the added time of the second half. For his efforts to make the team competitive at every competition Sanfrecce partook in, Skibbe won J.League Manager of the Year, the club's 4th 'Manager of the Year' award.

On 20 June 2024, AFC confirmed Sanfrecce would participate in the inaugural 2024–25 AFC Champions League Two group stage, marking their first appearance in a second-tier continental competition. Sanfrecce was drawn in Group E alongside Australian Sydney FC, Philippines Kaya–Iloilo and Hong Kong Eastern. On 19 September Sanfreece made their debut in the tournament by playing Kaya–Iloilo at home, winning 3–0. Sanfrecce went on to top the group stage with five wins and a draw. In the round of 16, Sanfrecce faced Vietnamese Nam Định, defeating them by 7–0 on aggregate. In the quarter-finals, they were paired with another Southeast Asia side, Singaporean Lion City Sailors. Playing at home, Sanfrecce won the first leg by 6–1. However, the AFC decided to declare a 3–0 win to Lion City Sailors and a US$1,000 fine to Sanfrecce. The punishment came as Sanfrecce fielded their newly signed player Valère Germain, who was supposed to be serving a three-match suspension while playing for his previous club. Away in Singapore, Sanfrecce drew 1–1, being consequently knocked out of the competition by a 4–1 loss on aggregate. In the 2024 season, Sanfrecce finished the league as runners-up with 4 points short away from league winners but the club sees themselves qualifying to the 2025–26 AFC Champions League Elite.

== Team image ==
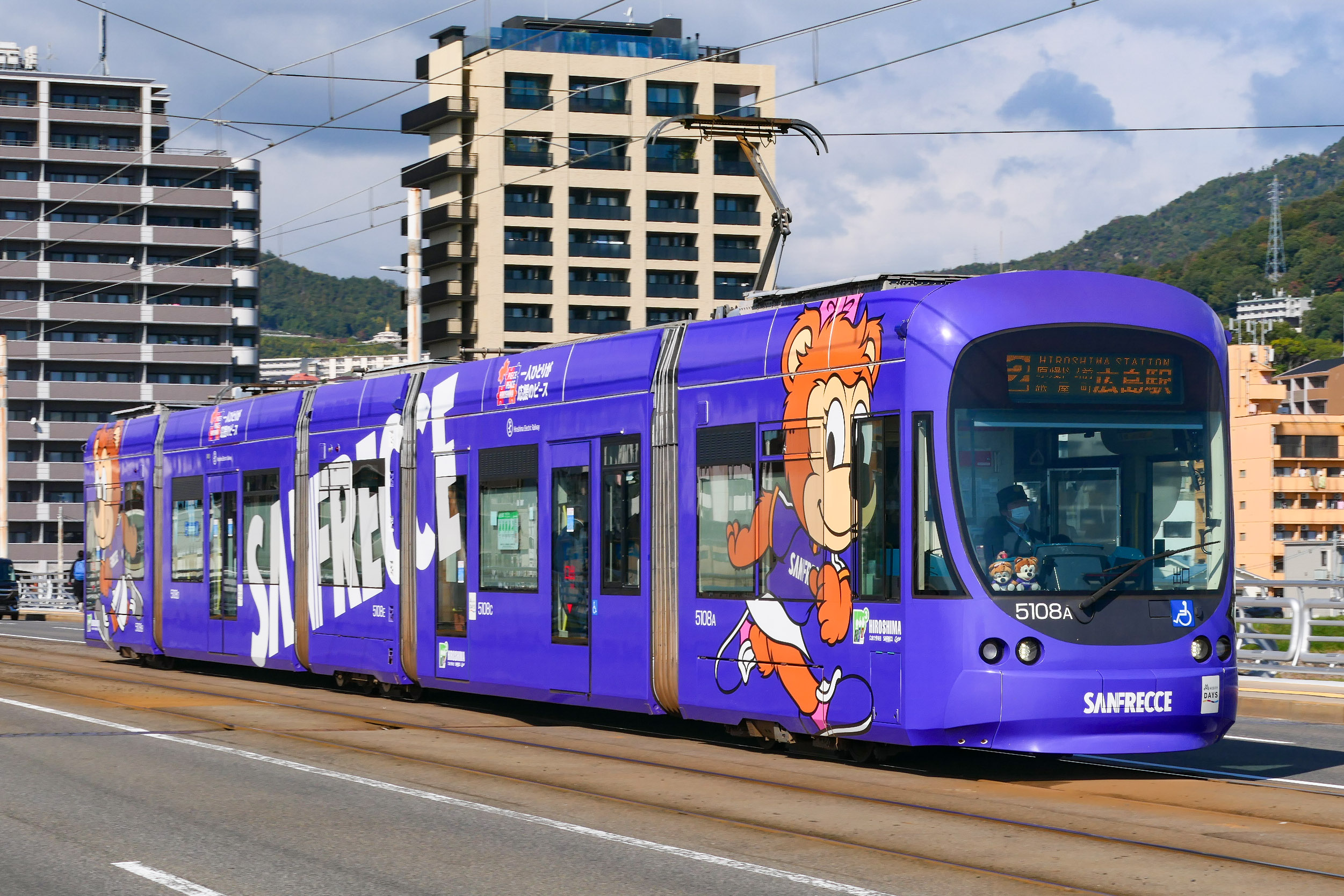
A train bound for Hiroshima Station is wrapped in "Sanfrecce Hiroshima" design and runs between Nishi-Hiroshima Station and Fukushima-cho Station on the Hiroshima Electric Railway Main Line in 2025

=== Name origin ===
The club name is a portmanteau of the Japanese word for three, San and the Italian word frecce, which means 'arrows'. This is based on the story of the feudal lord Mōri Motonari who told his three sons that while a single arrow might be easily snapped, three arrows held together would not be broken and urged them to work for the good of the clan and its retainers.

=== Former names ===
- 1938–1970: Toyo Kogyo Shukyu Club (東洋工業蹴球部)
- 1943–1946: Football was suspended during the period, due to the Pacific War.
- 1971–1980: Toyo Kogyo Soccer Club (東洋工業サッカー部)
- 1981–1983: Mazda Sports Club Toyo Kogyo Soccer Club (マツダスポーツクラブ東洋工業サッカー部)
- 1984–1985: Mazda Sports Club Soccer Club (マツダスポーツクラブサッカー部)
- 1986–1992: Mazda Soccer Club (マツダサッカークラブ)

== Stadium ==
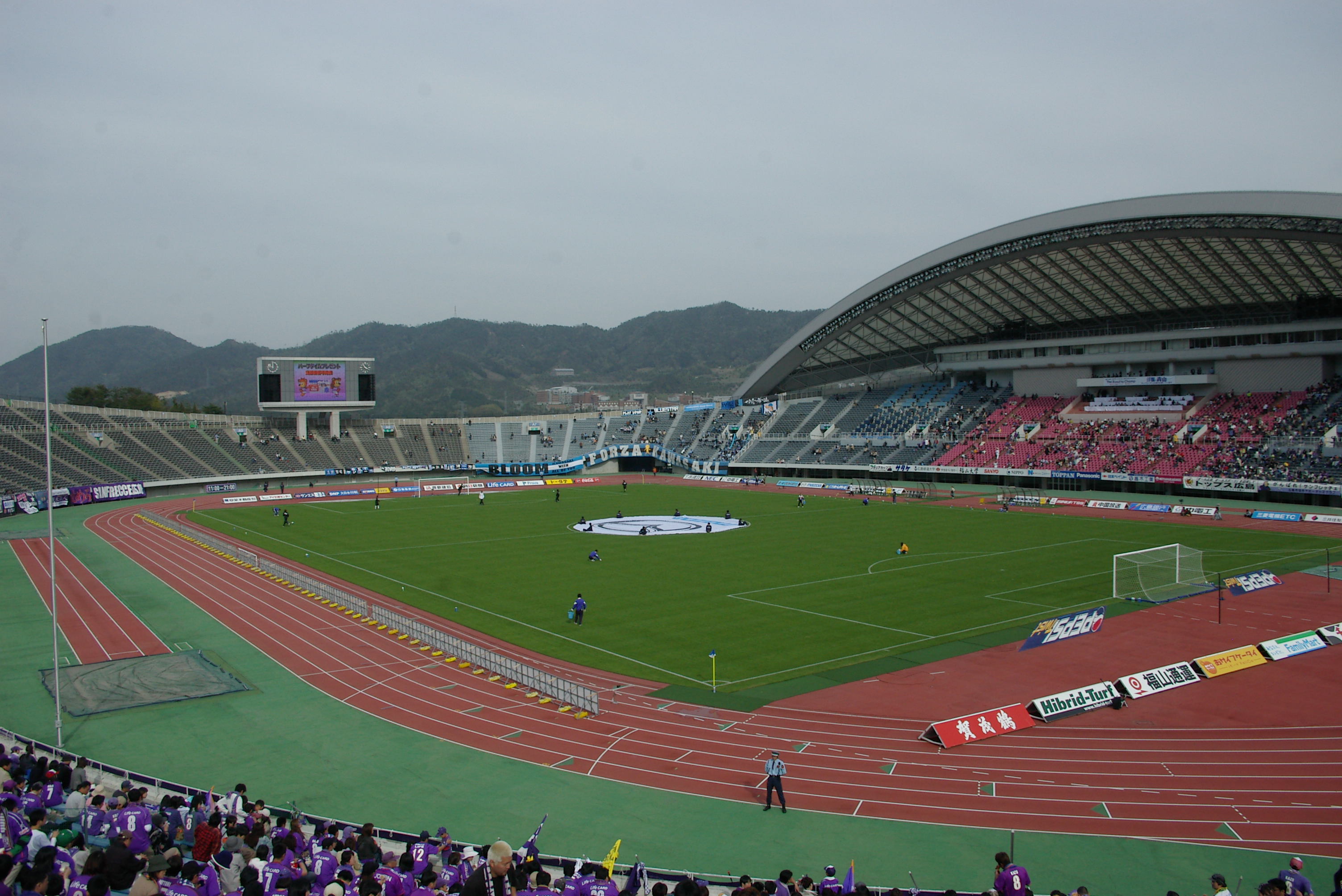
Sanfrecce Hiroshima former stadium, Hiroshima Big Arch

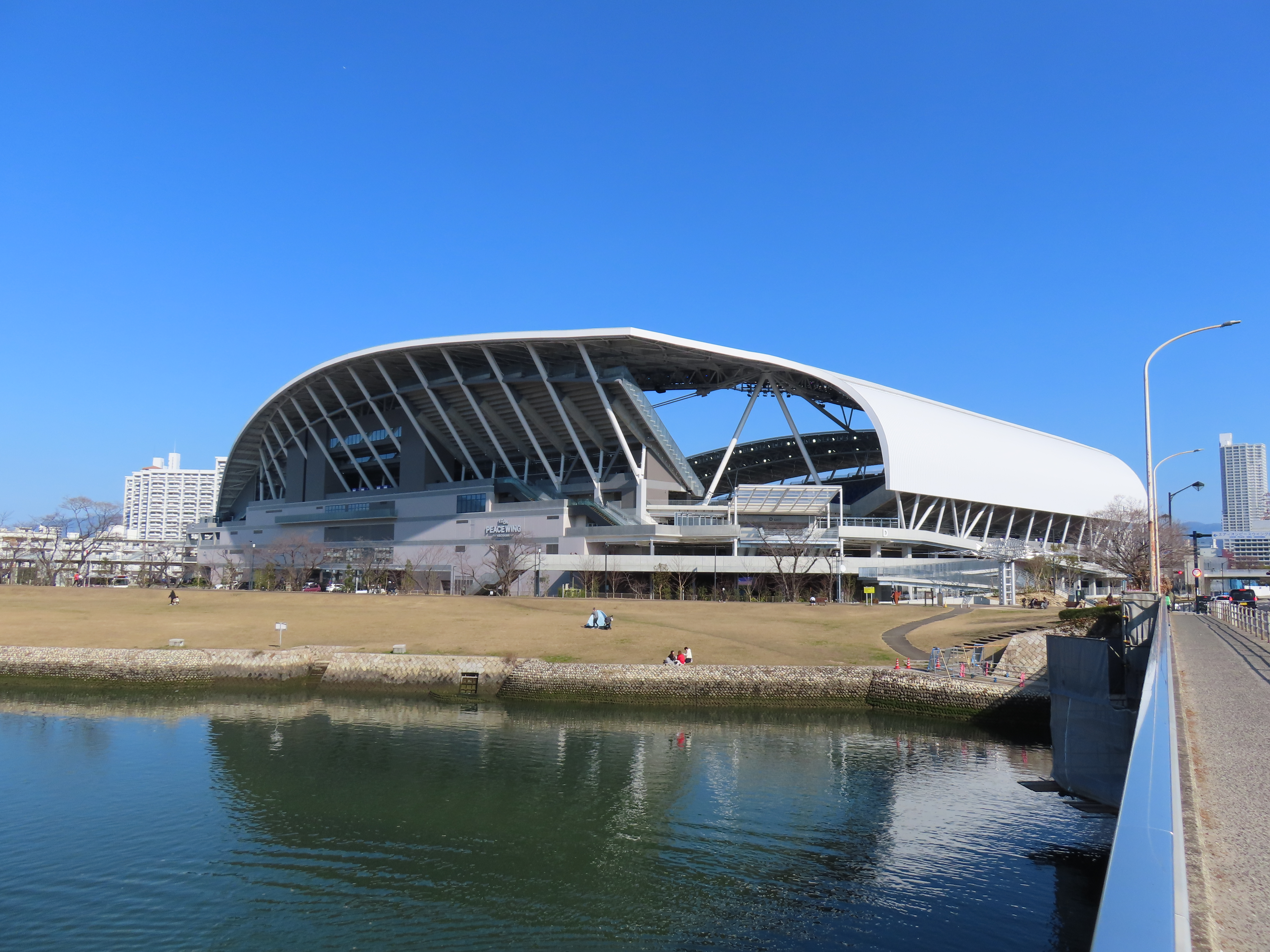
Sanfrecce Hiroshima current stadium, Edion Peace Wing Hiroshima

The club's home town is Hiroshima and previously played at the Hiroshima General Ground Main Stadium before moving to a new home stadium at the Hiroshima Big Arch from 1992 until 2023. The club holds its training sessions at the Yoshida Soccer Park in Akitakata, Hiroshima and Hiroshima 1st Ball Park until 2023. It has a capacity of 36,894.

Sanfrecce then moved to a new stadium in 2024, which has been named Edion Peace Wing. The land was historically home to the Hiroshima Hammers touch rugby team, but an agreement was reached between the two camps, with developers subsequently breaking ground in 2021. Sanfrecce's first competitive match at the new stadium was against Urawa Red Diamonds on 23 February 2024 which attracted an attendance of 27,545 spectators. Sanfreece then used the stadium in the 2024–25 AFC Champions League Two which make its debut in the tournament on 19 September 2024 in a 3–0 win against Philippines club Kaya–Iloilo.

== Kit suppliers and shirt sponsors ==
=== Sponsors ===
Period	Kit manufacturer	Main sponsors
1989–1991	(Germany) Adidas	(Japan) Mazda
1992–1993	(Japan) Mizuno	(Japan) Mazda
1994	(Japan) Mizuno	(United States) Ford
1995–1996	(Japan) Mizuno	(Japan) Mazda
1997–2010	(Japan) Mizuno	(Japan) Deodeo (Japan) Mazda (AFC matches)
2011	(United States) Nike	(Japan) Deodeo (Japan) Mazda (AFC matches)
2012–present	(United States) Nike	(Japan) EDION (Japan) Mazda (AFC matches)

=== Colours ===
The main colour of Sanfrecce Hiroshima is purple.

=== Kit evolution ===
Home Kits – 1st
1992–1995	1996–1999	2000–2002	2003–2004	2005–2006
2007–2009	2010	2011	2012	2013
2014	2015	2016	2017	2018
2019	2020	2021	2022	2023
2024	2025			

Away Kits – 2nd
1992–1995	1996–1999	2000–2002	2003–2004	2005–2006
2007–2009	2010	2011	2012	2013
2014	2015	2016	2017	2018
2019	2020	2021	2022	2023
2024	2025			

Special Kits – 3rd
2011 3rd	2012 3rd	2018 8.11; Peace Memorial	2019 3rd	2019 8.3; Peace Memorial
2021; LIMITED; Carp Collaboration	2024; Friendly Matches vs VfB Stuttgart			

== Affiliated clubs ==
- (Germany) 1.FC Köln

On 15 August 2021, Sanfrecce Hiroshima signed partnership with German Bundesliga side, 1.FC Köln where both club are building up their international relations and have entered a co-operation with J.League club Sanfrecce for the coming two-and-a-half years. The partnership will centre on Sport and Management. The co-operation sees the Germany side continue its internationalisation strategy, which is an important part of the Matchplan.

In the sporting sector, the co-operation includes coaching courses, training camp and intensive discussions surrounding the youth academy and scouting at both clubs have set themselves the goal that they should be amongst the best clubs in the league at academy level. As for the management side of the partnership, seminars are planned in Hiroshima and Köln, where those in charge of departments from both clubs will come together to work on a strategy going forward.

== Players ==
=== First-team squad ===
As of 7 September 2026

Note: Flags indicate national team as defined under FIFA eligibility rules; some limited exceptions apply. Players may hold more than one non-FIFA nationality.

No.	Pos.	Nation	Player
1	GK	JPN	Keisuke Ōsako
3	DF	JPN	Taichi Yamasaki
4	DF	JPN	Hayato Araki
5	DF	JPN	Naoto Arai
6	MF	JPN	Hayao Kawabe
7	MF	JPN	Shunki Higashi
8	MF	JPN	Takumu Kawamura
9	FW	AUS	Kusini Yengi (on loan from (Scotland) Aberdeen)
10	FW	JPN	Akito Suzuki
11	FW	JPN	Mutsuki Kato
14	MF	JPN	Taishi Matsumoto
15	DF	JPN	Shuto Nakano
18	MF	JPN	Daiki Suga
19	DF	JPN	Sho Sasaki (captain)
21	GK	JPN	Yudai Tanaka
22	FW	CIV	Sébastien Haller

No.	Pos.	Nation	Player
23	FW	JPN	Shun Ayukawa
29	FW	JPN	Takuma Asano
32	MF	JPN	Sota Koshimichi
33	DF	JPN	Tsukasa Shiotani
35	MF	JPN	Yotaro Nakajima
37	DF	KOR	Kim Ju-sung
41	FW	JPN	Naoki Maeda
43	GK	JPN	Hikaru Ogawa
45	MF	JPN	Shimon Kobayashi
46	MF	JPN	Rento Noguchi ^{Type 2}
47	MF	JPN	Minato Hara ^{Type 2}
48	DF	JPN	Hiroto Ota ^{Type 2}
49	DF	JPN	Leedo Morii ^{Type 2}
50	FW	JPN	Narumi Takahashi ^{Type 2}
99	GK	JPN	Issei Ouchi

=== Out on loan ===
Note: Flags indicate national team as defined under FIFA eligibility rules; some limited exceptions apply. Players may hold more than one non-FIFA nationality.

No.	Pos.	Nation	Player
38	GK	JPN	Cailen Hill (at Blaublitz Akita)
39	FW	JPN	Sōta Nakamura (at (France) Le Havre)
40	MF	JPN	Motoki Ohara (at Júbilo Iwata)
—	DF	JPN	Shota Kofie (at Iwaki FC)

No.	Pos.	Nation	Player
—	DF	JPN	Osamu Henry Iyoha (at RB Omiya Ardija)
—	DF	JPN	Kohei Hosoya (at Ehime FC)
—	FW	JPN	Aren Inoue (at Matsumoto Yamaga)

== Management and staff ==
Position	Name
Manager	(Poland) (Germany) Bartosch Gaul
Assistant manager	(Japan) Kenji Arima
Coach	(Japan) Shinya Sakoi (Japan) Masaru Misuno (Japan) Yoshifumi Matsuo
Goalkeeping coach	(Japan) Shinkichi Kikuchi (Japan) Takuto Hayashi
Physical coach	(Japan) Minekazu Isobe

== Honours ==
As Toyo Kogyo SC and Mazda SC (amateur era) as well as Sanfrecce Hiroshima (professional era)

Type	Honours	Titles	Season
League	J1 League	3	2012, 2013, 2015
League	J2 League	1	2008
League	Japan Soccer League Division 1	5	1965, 1966, 1967, 1968, 1970
League	All Japan Works Football Championship	2	1956, 1962
Cup	Emperor's Cup	3	1965, 1967, 1969
Cup	J.League Cup	2	2022, 2025
Cup	Japanese Super Cup	5	2008, 2013, 2014, 2016, 2025
Cup	NHK Super Cup	1	1967

Bold is for those competition that are currently active.

== Records and statistics ==
As of 25 March 2026.

Top 10 all-time appearances
Rank	Player	Years	Club appearance
1	(Japan) Toshihiro Aoyama	2004–2024	596
2	(Japan) Kazuyuki Morisaki	1999–2018	594
3	(Japan) Kota Hattori	1996–2011	529
4	(Japan) Hisato Satō	2005–2016	478
5	(Japan) Kōji Morisaki	2000–2016	414
6	(Japan) Takashi Shimoda	1994–2010	391
7	(Japan) Sho Sasaki	2015–present	383
8	(Japan) Tsukasa Shiotani	2012–2017, 2021–present	379
9	(Japan) Yoshifumi Kashiwa	2014–2024	375
10	(Japan) Kosei Shibasaki	2014–2023	306

Top 10 all-time goalscorer
Rank	Player	Club appearance	Total goals
1	(Japan) Hisato Satō	478	218
2	(Japan) Tatsuhiko Kubo	246	84
3	(Japan) Kōji Morisaki	414	78
4	(Japan) Takuya Takagi	189	67
5	(Japan) Susumu Oki	221	43
5	(Japan) Yojiro Takahagi	293	43
7	(Brazil) Douglas Vieira	172	42
8	(South Korea) Noh Jung-yoon	150	37
9	(Japan) Naoki Ishihara	129	36
10	(Brazil) Ueslei	68	35

- Biggest wins: 11–0 vs Cerezo Osaka (7 November 1965)
- Heaviest defeats: 0–8 vs Keio University Auswahl (5 May 1953)
- Youngest ever debutant: Yojiro Takahagi ~ 16 years 8 months 3 days old (On 5 April 2004 vs Shonan Bellmare)
- Oldest ever player: Takuto Hayashi ~ 41 years 3 months 16 days old (On 25 November 2023 vs Gamba Osaka)
- Youngest goal scorers: Issei Takayanagi ~ 17 years 10 months 10 days old (On 24 July 2004 vs Tokyo Verdy)
- Oldest goal scorers: Kosei Shibasaki ~ 38 years 9 months 21 days old (On 16 June 2023 vs Nagoya Grampus)

== Award winners ==
As of the end of the 2025 season.

=== Domestic ===
- J.League Player of the Year:
  - (Japan) Hisato Satō (2012)
  - (Japan) Toshihiro Aoyama (2015)
- J.League Top Scorer:
  - (Japan) Hisato Satō (2012)
  - (Nigeria) Peter Utaka (2016)
- J.League Best XI:
  - (Japan) Takuya Takagi (1994)
  - (Japan) Hisato Satō (2005, 2012)
  - (Japan) Tomoaki Makino (2010)
  - (Japan) Hiroki Mizumoto (2012)
  - (Japan) Shusaku Nishikawa (2012, 2013)
  - (Japan) Toshihiro Aoyama (2012, 2013, 2015)
  - (Japan) Yojiro Takahagi (2012)
  - (Japan) Tsukasa Shiotani (2014, 2015, 2016)
  - (Brazil) Douglas (2015)
  - (Japan) Keisuke Osako (2024)
  - (Japan) Sho Sasaki (2024)
  - (Japan) Hayato Araki (2025)
  - (Japan) Satoshi Tanaka (2025)
- J.League Best Young Player:
  - (Japan) Kazuyuki Morisaki (2000)
  - (Japan) Takuma Asano (2015)
- J.League Goal of the Year:

- (Japan) Toshihiro Aoyama against Sagan Tosu (27 June 2015)
- (Japan) Takumu Kawamura against Shimizu S-Pulse (3 September 2022)

- J.League Manager of the Year
  - (Japan) Hajime Moriyasu (2012, 2013, 2015)
  - (Germany) Michael Skibbe (2022, 2024)
- J.League Cup New Hero Award
  - (Japan) Yojiro Takahagi (2010)
  - (Japan) Yotaro Nakajima (2025)
- J2 League Top Scorer:
  - (Japan) Hisato Satō (2008)

=== International ===
- FIFA Club World Cup Top Scorer
  - (Japan) Hisato Satō (2012)
- FIFA Puskás Award nominee
  - (Japan) Hisato Satō (2014)

== Managerial history ==
Manager	Period	Honours	Assistant manager
As Toyo Kogyo
(Japan) Yoshiki Yamazaki	1938–1942, 1947–1950		—N/a
(Japan) Minoru Obata	1951–1963	– 1956 All Japan Works Football Championship – 1962 All Japan Works Football Championship	—N/a
(Japan) Yukio Shimomura	1964–1971	– 1965 Japan Soccer League – 1965 Emperor's Cup – 1966 Japan Soccer League – 1967 Japan Soccer League – 1967 Emperor's Cup – 1967 NHK Super Cup – 1968 Japan Soccer League – 1969 Emperor's Cup – 1970 Japan Soccer League	—N/a
(Japan) Kenzo Ohashi	1972–1975		—N/a
(Japan) Ikuo Matsumoto	1976		—N/a
(Japan) Aritatsu Ogi	1977–1980		—N/a
As MAZDA Sports
(Japan) Teruo Nimura	1981–1983		(Germany) Eckhard Krautzun (August – September 1983)
(Japan) Kazuo Imanishi	1984–1987		(Netherlands) Hans Ooft (1984–1987) (Netherlands) Dido Havenaar (1986–1987)
(Netherlands) Hans Ooft	1987–1988		(Netherlands) Dido Havenaar (1987–1988)
(Japan) Kazuo Imanishi	1988–1992		(England) Bill Foulkes (1988–1991)
As Sanfreece Hiroshima
(Scotland) Stuart Baxter	1 July 1992 – 31 January 1995		(Sweden) Jan Jönsson (1993–1994)
(Netherlands) Wim Jansen	1 February 1996 – 31 January 1997		
(Scotland) Eddie Thomson	1 February 1997 – 31 January 2001		(Scotland) Tom Sermanni (1997–1998)
(Russia) Valeri Nepomniachi	1 February 2001 – 17 December 2001		
(Russia) Gadzhi Gadzhiev	1 February 2002 – 15 July 2002		
(Japan) Takahiro Kimura	16 July 2002 – 30 November 2002		
(Japan) Takeshi Ono	1 December 2002 – 1 April 2006		
(Japan) Kazuyori Mochizuki (interim)	2 April 2006 – 9 June 2006		
(Serbia) Mihailo Petrović	10 June 2006 – 31 December 2011	– 2008 J2 League – 2008 Japanese Super Cup	(Serbia) Ranko Popović (2006–2007)
(Japan) Hajime Moriyasu	1 January 2012 – 4 July 2017	– 2012 J1 League – 2013 J1 League – 2013 Japanese Super Cup – 2014 Japanese Super Cup – 2015 J1 League – 2016 Japanese Super Cup	—N/a
(Sweden) Jan Jönsson	10 July 2017 – 7 December 2017		—N/a
(Japan) Hiroshi Jofuku	7 December 2017 – 25 October 2021		—N/a
(Japan) Kentaro Sawada	26 October 2021 – 31 January 2022		—N/a
(Germany) Michael Skibbe	1 February 2022 – 6 December 2025	– 2022 J.League Cup – 2025 J.League Cup – 2025 Japanese Super Cup	(Japan) Shinya Sakoi (2022–2025)
(Poland) (Germany) Bartosch Gaul	16 December 2025 – present		(Japan) Kenji Arima (2026–present)

== Season by season record ==
=== J.League history ===
- Division 1 (Japan Soccer League Div. 1): 1965–1983 (as Toyo 1965–1980, as Mazda 1981–)
- Division 2 (Japan Soccer League Div. 2): 1984–1985
- Division 1 (Japan Soccer League Div. 1): 1986/87–1987/88
- Division 2 (Japan Soccer League Div. 2): 1988/89–1990/91
- Division 1 (Japan Soccer League Div. 1): 1991/92
- Division 1 (J.League/J. League Div. 1): 1993–2002 (as Sanfrecce Hiroshima)
- Division 2 (J.League Div. 2): 2003
- Division 1 (J.League Div. 1): 2004–2007
- Division 2 (J.League Div. 2): 2008
- Division 1 (J.League Div. 1/J1 League): 2009–present

Total (as of 2022): 51 seasons in the top tier and 7 seasons in the second tier.

=== J.League records ===
Champions	Runners-up	Third place	Promoted	Relegated

Season	Div.	Clubs	Pos.	Attendance/G	J.League Cup	Emperor's Cup	AFC CLE	AFC CL2	FIFA CWC
1992	–	–	–	–	Group stage	2nd round	Did not qualify	–	Did not qualify
1993	J1	10	5th	16,644	Group stage	Semi-finals	Did not qualify	–	Did not qualify
1994	J1	12	2nd	17,191	1st round	Quarter-finals	Did not qualify	–	Did not qualify
1995	J1	14	10th	11,689	–	Runners up	Did not qualify	–	Did not qualify
1996	J1	16	14th	8,469	Group stage	Runners up	Did not qualify	–	Did not qualify
1997	J1	17	12th	6,533	Group stage	Round of 16	Did not qualify	–	Did not qualify
1998	J1	18	10th	8,339	Group stage	Quarter-finals	Did not qualify	–	Did not qualify
1999	J1	16	8th	9,377	2nd round	Runners up	Did not qualify	–	Did not qualify
2000	J1	16	11th	8,865	2nd round	Round of 16	Did not qualify	–	Did not qualify
2001	J1	16	9th	9,916	Quarter-finals	Round of 16	Did not qualify	–	Did not qualify
2002	J1	16	15th	10,941	Group stage	Semi-finals	Did not qualify	–	Did not qualify
2003	J2	12	2nd	9,000	–	Round of 16	Did not qualify	–	Did not qualify
2004	J1	16	12th	14,800	Group stage	4th round	Did not qualify	–	Did not qualify
2005	J1	18	7th	12,527	Group stage	Round of 16	Did not qualify	–	Did not qualify
2006	J1	18	10th	11,180	Group stage	Round of 16	Did not qualify	–	Did not qualify
2007	J1	18	16th	11,423	Quarter-finals	Runners up	Did not qualify	–	Did not qualify
2008	J2	15	1st	10,840	–	Quarter-finals	Did not qualify	–	Did not qualify
2009	J1	18	4th	15,723	Group stage	3rd round	Did not qualify	–	Did not qualify
2010	J1	18	7th	14,562	Runners up	3rd round	Group stage	–	Did not qualify
2011	J1	18	7th	13,203	1st round	3rd round	–	–	Did not qualify
2012	J1	18	1st	17,721	Group stage	2nd round	–	–	5th place
2013	J1	18	1st	16,209	Quarter-finals	Runners up	Group stage	–	Not eligible
2014	J1	18	8th	14,997	Runners up	Round of 16	Round of 16	–	Not eligible
2015	J1	18	1st	16,382	Group stage	Quarter-finals	–	–	3rd Place
2016	J1	18	6th	15,464	Quarter-finals	Quarter-finals	Group stage	–	Not eligible
2017	J1	18	15th	14,042	Play-off stage	Round of 16	–	–	Not eligible
2018	J1	18	2nd	14,346	Group stage	Round of 16	–	–	Not eligible
2019	J1	18	6th	13,886	Quarter-finals	Round of 16	Round of 16	–	Not eligible
2020 †	J1	18	8th	4,545	Group stage	Did not qualify	–	–	Not eligible
2021 †	J1	20	11th	5,920	Group stage	2nd round	–	–	Not eligible
2022	J1	18	3rd	10,493	Winners	Runners-up	–	–	Not eligible
2023	J1	18	3rd	16,128	Group stage	3rd round	–	–	Not eligible
2024	J1	20	2nd	25,609	Quarter-finals	Quarter-finals	TBD	–	Not eligible
2025	J1	20	4th	25,585	Winners	Semi-finals	–	–	Not eligible
2026	J1	10	TBD		N/A	N/A			
2026-27	J1	20	TBD		TBD	TBD			

Key

- Pos. = Position in league
- Attendance/G = Average home league attendance
- † 2020 & 2021 seasons attendances reduced by COVID-19 worldwide pandemic
- Source: J.League Data Site

== Continental record ==
Season	Competition	Round	Club	Home	Away	Aggregate
2010	AFC Champions League	Group H	(China) Shandong Luneng	0–1	3–2	3rd out of 4
2010	AFC Champions League	Group H	(South Korea) Pohang Steelers	4–3	1–2	3rd out of 4
2010	AFC Champions League	Group H	(Australia) Adelaide United	1–0	2–3	3rd out of 4
2013	AFC Champions League	Group G	(Uzbekistan) Bunyodkor	0–2	0–0	4th out of 4
2013	AFC Champions League	Group G	(China) Beijing Guoan	0–0	1–2	4th out of 4
2013	AFC Champions League	Group G	(South Korea) Pohang Steelers	0–1	1–1	4th out of 4
2014	AFC Champions League	Group F	(China) Beijing Guoan	1–1	2–2	2nd out of 4
2014	AFC Champions League	Group F	(Australia) Central Coast Mariners	1–0	1–2	2nd out of 4
2014	AFC Champions League	Group F	(South Korea) FC Seoul	2–1	2–2	2nd out of 4
2014	AFC Champions League	Round of 16	(Australia) Western Sydney Wanderers	3–1	0–2	3–3 (a)
2016	AFC Champions League	Group F	(China) Shandong Luneng	1–2	0–1	3rd out of 4
2016	AFC Champions League	Group F	(South Korea) FC Seoul	2–1	1–4	3rd out of 4
2016	AFC Champions League	Group F	(Thailand) Buriram United	3–0	2–0	3rd out of 4
2019	AFC Champions League	Play-off round	(Thailand) Chiangrai United	0–0 (a.e.t.) (4–3 p)	—N/a	—N/a
2019	AFC Champions League	Group F	(China) Guangzhou Evergrande	1–0	0–2	1st out of 4
2019	AFC Champions League	Group F	(Australia) Melbourne Victory	2–1	3–1	1st out of 4
2019	AFC Champions League	Group F	(South Korea) Daegu FC	2–0	1–0	1st out of 4
2019	AFC Champions League	Round of 16	(Japan) Kashima Antlers	3–2	0–1	3–3 (a)
2024–25	AFC Champions League Two	Group E	(Philippines) Kaya–Iloilo	3–0	1–1	1st out of 4
2024–25	AFC Champions League Two	Group E	(Hong Kong) Eastern	4–1	3–2	1st out of 4
2024–25	AFC Champions League Two	Group E	(Australia) Sydney FC	2–1	1–0	1st out of 4
2024–25	AFC Champions League Two	Round of 16	(Vietnam) Nam Định	4–0	3–0	7–0
2024–25	AFC Champions League Two	Quarter-finals	(Singapore) Lion City Sailors	0–3 FF (Note: Lion City Sailors were awarded a 0–3 victory by forfeit, after Sanfrecce Hiroshima fielded an ineligible player. The score on the field was originally a 6–1 win by Sanfrecce Hiroshima.)	1–1	1–4
2025–26	AFC Champions League Elite	League stage	(Australia) Melbourne City	—N/a	2–0	3rd out of 12
2025–26	AFC Champions League Elite	League stage	(China) Shanghai Port	1–1	—N/a	3rd out of 12
2025–26	AFC Champions League Elite	League stage	(South Korea) Ulsan HD	—N/a	0–1	3rd out of 12
2025–26	AFC Champions League Elite	League stage	(South Korea) Gangwon FC	1–0	—N/a	3rd out of 12
2025–26	AFC Champions League Elite	League stage	(China) Chengdu Rongcheng	—N/a	1–1	3rd out of 12
2025–26	AFC Champions League Elite	League stage	(China) Shanghai Shenhua	1–0	—N/a	3rd out of 12
2025–26	AFC Champions League Elite	League stage	(Malaysia) Johor Darul Ta'zim	2–1	—N/a	3rd out of 12
2025–26	AFC Champions League Elite	League stage	(South Korea) FC Seoul	—N/a	2–2	3rd out of 12
2025–26	AFC Champions League Elite	Round of 16	(Malaysia) Johor Darul Ta'zim	1–0	1–3	2–3
