= 2022 J.League Cup final =

2022JリーグYBCルヴァンカップ 決勝
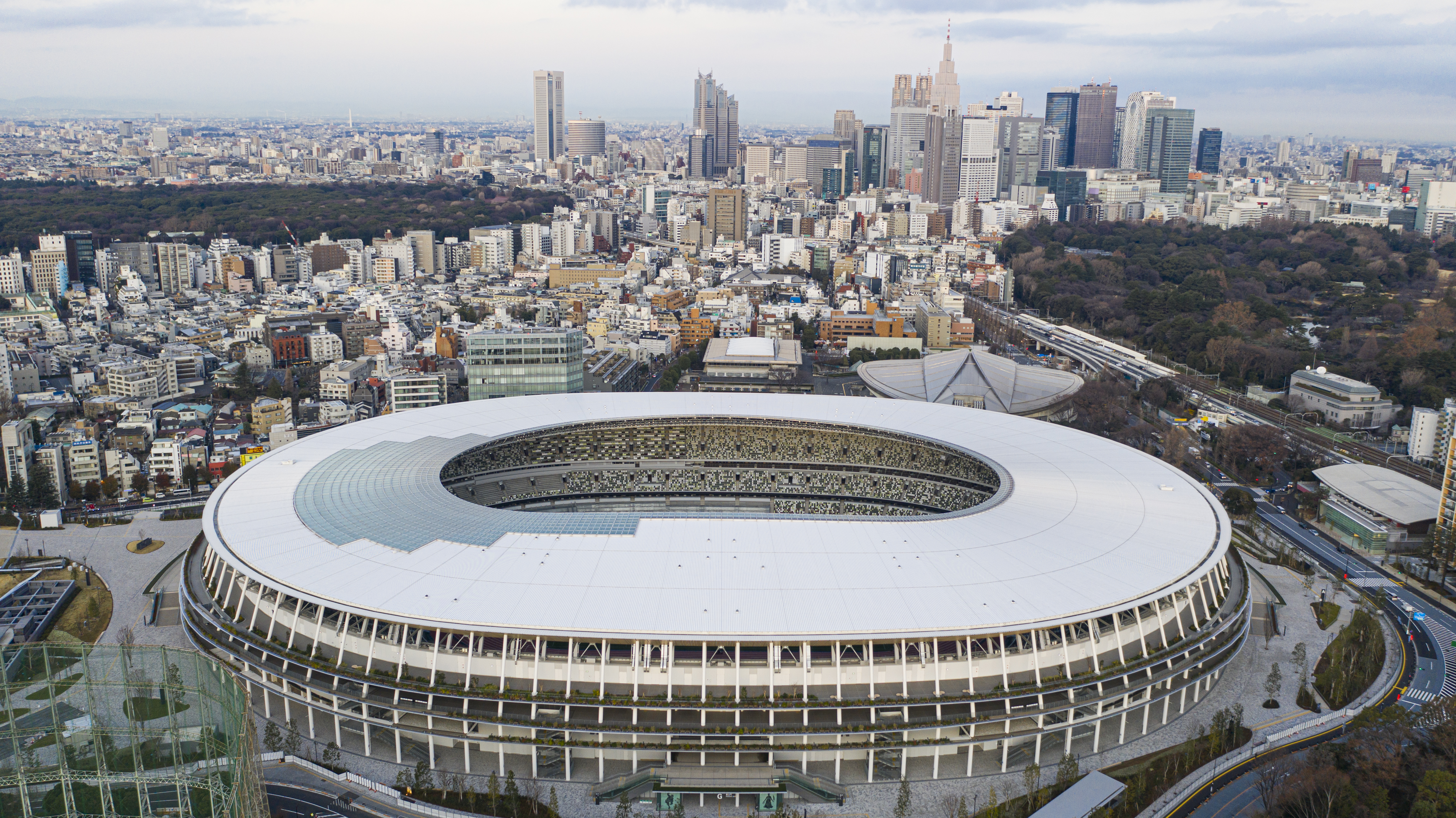
- The match took place at Japan National Stadium
- Event: 2022 J.League Cup
Cerezo Osaka	Sanfrecce Hiroshima
1	2
- Date: 22 October 2022
- Venue: National Stadium, Tokyo
- Man of the Match: Pieros Sotiriou
- Referee: Yudai Yamamoto
- Attendance: 39,608
- Weather: Sunny; 21.4 °C (71 °F)

The 2022 J.League Cup final was an association football match between Cerezo Osaka and Sanfrecce Hiroshima on 22 October 2022 at Japan National Stadium. It was the 30th edition J.League Cup, organised by the J.League. Cerezo Osaka were making their third J.League Cup final appearance after winning the competition in 2017 and finishing runners-up in 2021. Sanfrecce Hiroshima had previously appeared in two J.League cup finals but were beaten on both occasions in 2010 and 2014.

Prior to the game, a moment of silence was held to honor the death of former Sanfrecce Hiroshima player Masato Kudo, who had died a day before from complications of brain surgery.

Yudai Yamamoto was the referee for the match, which was played in front of 39,608 spectators. After a goalless first half, Cerezo Osaka scored after half time thanks to Mutsuki Kato and held their lead, until a red card was given to Matej Jonjić after striking Sanfrecce player Nassim Ben Khalifa, which put in Pieros Sotiriou. Sotiriou then scored on a spot kick with three minutes left in stoppage time, then scored again with barely any time left in stoppage in the 101st minute on a corner kick by Makoto Mitsuta, stealing the win from Cerezo Osaka.

As winners, Sanfrecce Hiroshima earned the right to play against the winners of the 2022 Copa Sudamericana in the J.League Cup / Copa Sudamericana Championship.

== Teams ==
Team	League	Previous finals appearances (bold indicates winners)
Cerezo Osaka	J1 League	2 (**2017**, 2021)
Sanfrecce Hiroshima	J1 League	2 (2010, 2014)

== Route to the final ==
The tournament consisted of all 18 J1 League teams as well as the top two relegated teams from the 2021 league, beginning with a home-and-away round-robin group stage consisting of four groups of four teams. The top two teams of each group would then advance to a two-legged play-off stage. The winners of the play-offs would then be entered into a final knockout stage, alongside four teams that received byes due to their commitments in the 2022 AFC Champions League group stage.

Cerezo Osaka				Round	Sanfrecce Hiroshima			
Opponent	Result			Group stage	Opponent	Result		
Gamba Osaka	2–3 (A)			Matchday 1	Tokushima Vortis	0–3 (A)		
Kashima Antlers	0–1 (A)			Matchday 2	Nagoya Grampus	2–0 (H)		
Oita Trinita	6–1 (H)			Matchday 3	Shimizu S-Pulse	1–2 (H)		
Kashima Antlers	1–3 (H)			Matchday 4	Nagoya Grampus	1–2 (A)		
Gamba Osaka	0–0 (H)			Matchday 5	Tokushima Vortis	4–0 (H)		
Oita Trinita	3–3 (A)			Matchday 6	Shimizu S-Pulse	2–1 (A)		
**Group A runners-up**: Pos / Team / Pld / Pts; 1 / Kashima Antlers / 6 / **13**; 2 / **Cerezo Osaka** / 6 / **11**; 3 / Gamba Osaka / 6 / **5**; 4 / Oita Trinita / 6 / **3**; Source: League table, Match results				Final standings	**Group B winners**: Pos / Team / Pld / Pts; 1 / **Sanfrecce Hiroshima** / 6 / **12**; 2 / Nagoya Grampus / 6 / **10**; 3 / Shimizu S-Pulse / 6 / **8**; 4 / Tokushima Vortis / 6 / **4**; Source: League table, Match results			
Opponent	Agg.	1st leg	2nd leg	Knockout phase	Opponent	Agg.	1st leg	2nd leg
Shonan Bellmare	5–1	1–0 (H)	1–4 (A)	Play-off stage	Consadole Sapporo	4–1	0–3 (A)	1–1 (H)
Kawasaki Frontale	3–3 (a)	1–1 (H)	2–2 (A)	Quarter-finals	Yokohama F. Marinos	5–2	3–1 (H)	1–2 (A)
Urawa Reds	5–1	1–1 (H)	0–4 (A)	Semi-finals	Avispa Fukuoka	3–2	2–3 (A)	0–0 (H)

== Match ==
=== Details ===
22 October 2022
13:11 JST

Cerezo Osaka	1–2	Sanfrecce Hiroshima
Kato 53'	JLeague.co (EN); JLeague.jp (JA)	Sotiriou 90+6' (pen.), 90+11'

Japan National Stadium, Tokyo
Attendance: 39,608
Referee: Yudai Yamamoto

GK	21	(South Korea) Kim Jin-hyeon
DF	2	(Japan) Riku Matsuda
DF	22	(Croatia) Matej Jonjić	(red card) 79'
DF	24	(Japan) Koji Toriumi
DF	6	(Japan) Ryosuke Yamanaka
MF	16	(Japan) Seiya Maikuma
MF	25	(Japan) Hiroaki Okuno (c)
MF	17	(Japan) Tokuma Suzuki
MF	19	(Japan) Hirotaka Tameda		(substituted off) 80'
FW	20	(Japan) Mutsuki Kato		(substituted off) 70'
FW	7	(Japan) Satoki Uejo		(substituted off) 70'
Substitutes:
GK	31	(Japan) Keisuke Shimizu
DF	29	(Japan) Kakeru Funaki
DF	33	(Japan) Ryuya Nishio		(substituted on) 80'
MF	10	(Japan) Hiroshi Kiyotake		(substituted on) 70'
MF	41	(Japan) Hikaru Nakahara
FW	26	(Brazil) Jean Patric
FW	38	(Japan) Sota Kitano	(yellow card) 85'	(substituted on) 70'
Manager:
(Japan) Akio Kogiku

GK	38	(Japan) Keisuke Osako (c)
DF	3	(Japan) Tsukasa Shiotani		(substituted off) 90'
DF	4	(Japan) Hayato Araki
DF	19	(Japan) Sho Sasaki
MF	2	(Japan) Yuki Nogami	(yellow card) 81'	(substituted off) 90'
MF	7	(Japan) Gakuto Notsuda		(substituted off) 80'
MF	19	(Japan) Taishi Matsumoto		(substituted off) 63'
MF	27	(Japan) Takumu Kawamura
MF	39	(Japan) Makoto Mitsuta
MF	10	(Japan) Tsukasa Morishima
FW	13	(Switzerland) Nassim Ben Khalifa	(yellow card) 74'
Substitutes:
GK	22	(Japan) Goro Kawanami
DF	21	(Japan) Jelani Reshaun Sumiyoshi
MF	6	(Japan) Toshihiro Aoyama
MF	18	(Japan) Yoshifumi Kashiwa		(substituted on) 80'
MF	25	(Japan) Yusuke Chajima		(substituted on) 90'
MF	30	(Japan) Kosei Shibasaki		(substituted on) 90'
FW	20	(Cyprus) Pieros Sotiriou	(yellow card) 90+12'	(substituted on) 63'
Manager:
(Germany) Michael Skibbe

Assistant referees:
Hiroshi Yamauchi
Toshiyuki Tanaka
Fourth official:
Ryo Tanimoto

**Match rules**

- 90 minutes.
- 30 minutes of extra-time if necessary.
- Penalty shoot-out if scores still level.
- Seven named substitutes.
- Maximum of three substitutions.

=== Statistics ===
Statistic	Cerezo Osaka	Sanfrecce Hiroshima
Goals scored	1	2
Total shots	9	16
Corner kicks	5	5
Freekicks	12	11
Yellow cards	1	3
Red cards	1	0
