= 2022 J.League Cup =

2022 JリーグYBCルヴァンカップ

Tournament details
- Country: Japan
- Dates: 23 February – 22 October
- Teams: 16 (group stage); 20 (total)

Final positions
- Champions: Sanfrecce Hiroshima (1st title)
- Runners-up: Cerezo Osaka

Tournament statistics
- Matches played: 69
- Goals scored: 198 (2.87 per match)
- Attendance: 433,731 (6,286 per match)
- Top goal scorer: (Brazil) Júnior Santos (6 goals)

The 2022 J.League Cup, known as the 2022 J.League YBC Levain Cup (Japanese: 2022 JリーグYBCルヴァンカップ) for sponsorship reasons, was the 30th edition of J.League Cup, a Japanese association football cup competition. It began on 23 February 2022 and ended on 22 October that year.

Nagoya Grampus were the cup holders, having won their first title in 2021. They were eliminated in the quarter-finals by Urawa Red Diamonds.

Sanfrecce Hiroshima won their first League Cup title, beating Cerezo Osaka 2–1 in the final.

== Format ==
All 18 teams in the 2022 J1 League participated as well as the top two relegated teams from the 2021 league. Four clubs involved in the 2022 AFC Champions League received byes for the group and play-off stages: Kawasaki Frontale, Yokohama F. Marinos, Vissel Kobe, and Urawa Red Diamonds.

Sixteen teams played in the group stage. They were divided into four groups of four teams by their finish on the 2021 J1 and J2 Leagues (parenthesized below).

- Group A: Kashima Antlers (J1 4th), Cerezo Osaka (J1 12th), Gamba Osaka (J1 13th), Oita Trinita (J1 18th).
- Group B: Nagoya Grampus (J1 5th), Sanfrecce Hiroshima (J1 11th), Shimizu S-Pulse (J1 14th), Tokushima Vortis (J1 17th).
- Group C: Sagan Tosu (J1 7th), Hokkaido Consadole Sapporo (J1 10th), Kashiwa Reysol (J1 15th), Kyoto Sanga (J2 2nd).
- Group D: Avispa Fukuoka (J1 8th), FC Tokyo (J1 9th), Shonan Bellmare (J1 16th), Júbilo Iwata (J2 1st).

== Schedule ==
| Stage | Round | Date |
|---|---|---|
| Group stage | Matchday 1 | 23 February 2022 |
| Group stage | Matchday 2 | 2 March 2022 |
| Group stage | Matchday 3 | 26 March 2022 |
| Group stage | Matchday 4 | 13 April 2022 |
| Group stage | Matchday 5 | 23 April 2022 |
| Group stage | Matchday 6 | 18 May 2022 |
| Play-off stage | | 4 June 2022 (first leg); 11 June 2022 (second leg) |
Prime stage
| Prime stage | Quarter-finals | 3 August 2022 (first leg); 10 August 2022 (second leg) |
| Prime stage | Semi-finals | 21 September 2022 (first leg); 25 September 2022 (second leg) |
| Prime stage | Final | 22 October 2022 |

== Group stage ==
Each group were played on a home-and-away round-robin basis. Each match were played in 90 minutes. Each team played six times, twice against each opponent at home and away.

All times listed are in Japan Standard Time (JST, UTC+9).

=== Tiebreakers ===
In the group stage, teams in a group were ranked by points (3 points for a win, 1 point for a draw, 0 points for a loss). If the points were tied, the following tiebreakers were applied accordingly:

1. Points in head-to-head matches among tied teams;
2. Goal difference in head-to-head matches among tied teams;
3. Goals scored in head-to-head matches among tied teams;
4. Away goals scored in head-to-head matches among tied teams;

If more than two teams were tied, and applying all head-to-head criteria above remains a part of teams still tied, reapply the criteria above only for the tied teams.

1. Goal difference in all group matches;
2. Goals scored in all group matches;
3. Penalty shoot-out if only two teams are tied and they meet in the last round of the group;
4. Fewer disciplinary points;
5. Drawing of lots.

=== Group A ===
| Pos | Team | Pld | W | D | L | GF | GA | GD | Pts | Qualification |
|---|---|---|---|---|---|---|---|---|---|---|
| 1 | Kashima Antlers | 6 | 4 | 1 | 1 | 16 | 7 | +9 | 13 | Advance to play-off stage |
| 2 | Cerezo Osaka | 6 | 3 | 2 | 1 | 14 | 9 | +5 | 11 | Advance to play-off stage |
| 3 | Gamba Osaka | 6 | 1 | 2 | 3 | 8 | 12 | −4 | 5 | |
| 4 | Oita Trinita | 6 | 0 | 3 | 3 | 9 | 19 | −10 | 3 | |

Source: JLeague.co (EN), JLeague.jp (JA)
Rules for classification: Tiebreakers

| 23 February 2022 | Gamba Osaka | 2–3 | Cerezo Osaka | Suita |
| 14:03 | Yamamoto 59'; Yanagisawa 74' | JLeague.co (EN); JLeague.jp (JA) | Tameda 7'; Uejo 41'; Nakahara 84' | Stadium: Panasonic Stadium Suita; Attendance: 10,509; Referee: Akihiko Ikeuchi |

| 2 March 2022 | Kashima Antlers | 0–1 | Cerezo Osaka | Kashima |
| 19:03 | | JLeague.co (EN); JLeague.jp (JA) | Kitano 12' | Stadium: Kashima Soccer Stadium; Attendance: 3,966; Referee: Takafumi Mikuriya |

| 2 March 2022 | Oita Trinita | 2–2 | Gamba Osaka | Ōita |
| 19:03 | Nagasawa 11', 45+1' | JLeague.co (EN); JLeague.jp (JA) | Okuno 43' (pen.); Patric 63' | Stadium: Showa Denko Dome Oita; Attendance: 3,785; Referee: Hiroyuki Kimura |

| 15 March 2022 (Note: Originally was to be held on 23 February 2022, the match was postponed due to the COVID-19 outbreak in the Oita Trinita squad.) | Oita Trinita | 3–3 | Kashima Antlers | Ōita |
| 19:03 | Goya 14'; Yashiki 20'; Nagasawa 90+1' | JLeague.co (EN); JLeague.jp (JA) | Someno 3'; Pituca 62' (pen.); Ueda 75' (pen.) | Stadium: Showa Denko Dome Oita; Attendance: 2,938; Referee: Yudai Yamamoto |

| 26 March 2022 | Cerezo Osaka | 6–1 | Oita Trinita | Osaka |
| 14:03 | Maikuma 48'; Nakahara 50'; Okazawa 59'; Kato 80'; Inui 90+2'; Yamada 90+3' | JLeague.co (EN); JLeague.jp (JA) | Koide 24' | Stadium: Yodoko Sakura Stadium; Attendance: 4,846; Referee: Dai Matsumoto |

| 26 March 2022 | Kashima Antlers | 4–1 | Gamba Osaka | Kashima |
| 15:03 | Misao 52'; Suzuki 66'; Sekigawa 73'; Someno 90' | JLeague.co (EN); JLeague.jp (JA) | Patric 4' | Stadium: Kashima Soccer Stadium; Attendance: 6,260; Referee: Hayato Shimizu |

| 13 April 2022 | Gamba Osaka | 2–0 | Oita Trinita | Suita |
| 19:03 | Fujiharu 13'; Sato 58' | JLeague.co (EN); JLeague.jp (JA) | | Stadium: Panasonic Stadium Suita; Attendance: 4,413; Referee: Masuya Ueda |

| 13 April 2022 | Cerezo Osaka | 1–3 | Kashima Antlers | Osaka |
| 19:03 | Kitano 74' | JLeague.co (EN); JLeague.jp (JA) | Caíke 32' (pen.); Ueda 53'; Bueno 87' | Stadium: Yodoko Sakura Stadium; Attendance: 4,969; Referee: Takuto Okabe |

| 23 April 2022 | Cerezo Osaka | 0–0 | Gamba Osaka | Osaka |
| 14:03 | | JLeague.co (EN); JLeague.jp (JA) | | Stadium: Yodoko Sakura Stadium; Attendance: 12,058; Referee: Yoshiro Imamura |

| 23 April 2022 | Kashima Antlers | 3–0 | Oita Trinita | Kashima |
| 15:03 | Higuchi 51'; Suzuki 58'; Caíke 67' | JLeague.co (EN); JLeague.jp (JA) | | Stadium: Kashima Soccer Stadium; Attendance: 6,548; Referee: Hiroki Kasahara |

| 18 May 2022 | Gamba Osaka | 1–3 | Kashima Antlers | Suita |
| 19:03 | Miura 78' | JLeague.co (EN); JLeague.jp (JA) | Ueda 16'; Doi 58', 80' | Stadium: Panasonic Stadium Suita; Attendance: 4,254; Referee: Jumpei Iida |

| 18 May 2022 | Oita Trinita | 3–3 | Cerezo Osaka | Ōita |
| 19:03 | Samuel 22'; Watanabe 45+2', 77' | JLeague.co (EN); JLeague.jp (JA) | Kato 4'; Tameda 46'; Kitano 60' | Stadium: Showa Denko Dome Oita; Attendance: 2,517; Referee: Koichiro Fukushima |

=== Group B ===
| Pos | Team | Pld | W | D | L | GF | GA | GD | Pts | Qualification |
|---|---|---|---|---|---|---|---|---|---|---|
| 1 | Sanfrecce Hiroshima | 6 | 4 | 0 | 2 | 13 | 5 | +8 | 12 | Advance to play-off stage |
| 2 | Nagoya Grampus | 6 | 3 | 1 | 2 | 6 | 4 | +2 | 10 | Advance to play-off stage |
| 3 | Shimizu S-Pulse | 6 | 2 | 2 | 2 | 6 | 8 | −2 | 8 | |
| 4 | Tokushima Vortis | 6 | 1 | 1 | 4 | 5 | 13 | −8 | 4 | |

Source: JLeague.co (EN), JLeague.jp (JA)
Rules for classification: Tiebreakers

| 23 February 2022 | Nagoya Grampus | 0–0 | Shimizu S-Pulse | Toyota |
| 14:03 | | JLeague.co (EN); JLeague.jp (JA) | | Stadium: Toyota Stadium; Attendance: 8,285; Referee: Hiroyoshi Takayama |

| 23 February 2022 | Tokushima Vortis | 0–3 | Sanfrecce Hiroshima | Naruto |
| 14:03 | | JLeague.co (EN); JLeague.jp (JA) | Sumiyoshi 24'; Nagai 33'; Higashi 57' | Stadium: Pocarisweat Stadium; Attendance: 2,632; Referee: Ryuji Sato |

| 2 March 2022 | Shimizu S-Pulse | 1–1 | Tokushima Vortis | Shizuoka |
| 19:03 | Kamiya 70' | JLeague.co (EN); JLeague.jp (JA) | Bakenga 23' (pen.) | Stadium: IAI Stadium Nihondaira; Attendance: 5,064; Referee: Tomohiro Inoue |

| 2 March 2022 | Sanfrecce Hiroshima | 2–0 | Nagoya Grampus | Hiroshima |
| 19:03 | Mitsuta 44'; Júnior Santos 87' | JLeague.co (EN); JLeague.jp (JA) | | Stadium: Edion Stadium Hiroshima; Attendance: 1,870; Referee: Tetsuro Yoshida |

| 26 March 2022 | Nagoya Grampus | 2–0 | Tokushima Vortis | Toyota |
| 14:03 | Sakai 72'; Kakitani 75' | JLeague.co (EN); JLeague.jp (JA) | | Stadium: Toyota Stadium; Attendance: 6,932; Referee: Koei Koya |

| 26 March 2022 | Sanfrecce Hiroshima | 1–2 | Shimizu S-Pulse | Hiroshima |
| 14:03 | Sumiyoshi 63' | JLeague.co (EN); JLeague.jp (JA) | Kololli 20'; Hara 38' | Stadium: Edion Stadium Hiroshima; Attendance: 2,082; Referee: Koichiro Fukushima |

| 13 April 2022 | Tokushima Vortis | 4–1 | Shimizu S-Pulse | Naruto |
| 19:03 | Sugimori 39', 52'; Hyon 47'; Kodama 72' | JLeague.co (EN); JLeague.jp (JA) | Kuribara 90' | Stadium: Pocarisweat Stadium; Attendance: 1,475; Referee: Yuichi Nishimura |

| 13 April 2022 | Nagoya Grampus | 1–2 | Sanfrecce Hiroshima | Toyota |
| 19:33 | Mateus 10' | JLeague.co (EN); JLeague.jp (JA) | Júnior Santos 50'; Morishima 84' | Stadium: Toyota Stadium; Attendance: 4,689; Referee: Koki Nagamine |

| 23 April 2022 | Shimizu S-Pulse | 0–1 | Nagoya Grampus | Shizuoka |
| 14:03 | | JLeague.co (EN); JLeague.jp (JA) | Kanazaki 67' (pen.) | Stadium: IAI Stadium Nihondaira; Attendance: 7,688; Referee: Kazuyoshi Enomoto |

| 23 April 2022 | Sanfrecce Hiroshima | 4–0 | Tokushima Vortis | Hiroshima |
| 14:03 | Kashiwa 4'; Morishima 12'; Júnior Santos 22', 88' | JLeague.co (EN); JLeague.jp (JA) | | Stadium: Edion Stadium Hiroshima; Attendance: 5,218; Referee: Atsushi Kamimura |

| 18 May 2022 | Shimizu S-Pulse | 2–1 | Sanfrecce Hiroshima | Shizuoka |
| 19:03 | Kishimoto 34'; Taki 83' | JLeague.co (EN); JLeague.jp (JA) | Nagai 62' | Stadium: IAI Stadium Nihondaira; Attendance: 4,209; Referee: Keigo Sendachi |

| 18 May 2022 | Tokushima Vortis | 0–2 | Nagoya Grampus | Naruto |
| 19:03 | | JLeague.co (EN); JLeague.jp (JA) | Yoshida 10'; Abe 45+1' | Stadium: Pocarisweat Stadium; Attendance: 2,296; Referee: Akihiko Ikeuchi |

=== Group C ===
| Pos | Team | Pld | W | D | L | GF | GA | GD | Pts | Qualification |
|---|---|---|---|---|---|---|---|---|---|---|
| 1 | Kyoto Sanga | 6 | 3 | 1 | 2 | 8 | 11 | −3 | 10 | Advance to play-off stage |
| 2 | Hokkaido Consadole Sapporo | 6 | 2 | 2 | 2 | 13 | 11 | +2 | 8 (Note: Head-to-head points: Hokkaido Consadole Sapporo 3, Kashiwa Reysol 3. Head-to-head goal difference: Hokkaido Consadole Sapporo 0, Kashiwa Reysol 0. Head-to-head goals scored: Hokkaido Consadole Sapporo 4, Kashiwa Reysol 4. Head-to-head away goals: Hokkaido Consadole Sapporo 3, Kashiwa Reysol 2.) | Advance to play-off stage |
| 3 | Kashiwa Reysol | 6 | 2 | 2 | 2 | 9 | 8 | +1 | 8 | |
| 4 | Sagan Tosu | 6 | 1 | 3 | 2 | 9 | 9 | 0 | 6 | |

Source: JLeague.co (EN), JLeague.jp (JA)
Rules for classification: Tiebreakers
Notes:

| 23 February 2022 | Kyoto Sanga | 1–1 | Kashiwa Reysol | Kameoka |
| 14:03 | Kimura 6' | JLeague.co (EN); JLeague.jp (JA) | Maie 46' | Stadium: Sanga Stadium by Kyocera; Attendance: 4,025; Referee: Hirokazu Otsubo |

| 23 February 2022 | Sagan Tosu | 2–2 | Hokkaido Consadole Sapporo | Tosu |
| 15:03 | Nishi 2' (o.g.); Fujihara 72' | JLeague.co (EN); JLeague.jp (JA) | Tanaka 50'; Kaneko 59' | Stadium: Ekimae Real Estate Stadium; Attendance: 4,544; Referee: Tomohiro Inoue |

| 2 March 2022 | Kyoto Sanga | 2–1 | Sagan Tosu | Kameoka |
| 18:33 | Yamada 37'; Toyokawa 75' | JLeague.co (EN); JLeague.jp (JA) | Araki 86' | Stadium: Sanga Stadium by Kyocera; Attendance: 2,511; Referee: Keigo Sendachi |

| 2 March 2022 | Kashiwa Reysol | 2–3 | Hokkaido Consadole Sapporo | Kashiwa |
| 19:03 | Masukake 19', 24' | JLeague.co (EN); JLeague.jp (JA) | Fukai 57'; Nakashima 85', 90' | Stadium: Sankyo Frontier Kashiwa Stadium; Attendance: 3,177; Referee: Hajime Matsuo |

| 26 March 2022 | Kashiwa Reysol | 1–1 | Sagan Tosu | Kashiwa |
| 15:03 | Masukake 88' | JLeague.co (EN); JLeague.jp (JA) | Tashiro 62' | Stadium: Sankyo Frontier Kashiwa Stadium; Attendance: 3,590; Referee: Yuichi Nishimura |

| 13 April 2022 | Kyoto Sanga | 3–2 | Hokkaido Consadole Sapporo | Kameoka |
| 18:33 | Fukuoka 24'; Nakano 71'; Martinus 75' | JLeague.co (EN); JLeague.jp (JA) | Fernandes 2'; Okamura 20' | Stadium: Sanga Stadium by Kyocera; Attendance: 2,894; Referee: Toru Kakinuma |

| 13 April 2022 | Sagan Tosu | 1–3 | Kashiwa Reysol | Tosu |
| 19:03 | Honda 50' | JLeague.co (EN); JLeague.jp (JA) | Unoki 18'; Masukake 34'; Angelotti 65' | Stadium: Ekimae Real Estate Stadium; Attendance: 3,274; Referee: Hiroki Kasahara |

| 20 April 2022 (Note: Originally was to be held on 26 March 2022, the match was postponed due to the COVID-19 outbreak in the Kyoto Sanga squad.) | Hokkaido Consadole Sapporo | 4–1 | Kyoto Sanga | Sapporo |
| 19:03 | Gabriel Xavier 51', 75'; Nakashima 67', 88' | JLeague.co (EN); JLeague.jp (JA) | Omae 54' | Stadium: Sapporo Dome; Attendance: 3,627; Referee: Koki Nagamine |

| 23 April 2022 | Hokkaido Consadole Sapporo | 1–2 | Kashiwa Reysol | Sapporo |
| 13:03 | Tučić 14' | JLeague.co (EN); JLeague.jp (JA) | Sávio 90+3', 90+4' | Stadium: Sapporo Atsubetsu Stadium; Attendance: 4,450; Referee: Ryo Tanimoto |

| 23 April 2022 | Sagan Tosu | 3–0 | Kyoto Sanga | Tosu |
| 15:03 | Fukuta 5'; Iwasaki 50'; Fujihara 90+5' | JLeague.co (EN); JLeague.jp (JA) | | Stadium: Ekimae Real Estate Stadium; Attendance: 3,945; Referee: Yudai Yamamoto |

| 18 May 2022 | Hokkaido Consadole Sapporo | 1–1 | Sagan Tosu | Sapporo |
| 19:03 | Nakamura 74' | JLeague.co (EN); JLeague.jp (JA) | Nishikawa 80' | Stadium: Sapporo Dome; Attendance: 4,417; Referee: Hayato Shimizu |

| 18 May 2022 | Kashiwa Reysol | 0–1 | Kyoto Sanga | Kashiwa |
| 19:03 | | JLeague.co (EN); JLeague.jp (JA) | Omae 73' | Stadium: Sankyo Frontier Kashiwa Stadium; Attendance: 3,289; Referee: Hiroki Kasahara |

=== Group D ===
| Pos | Team | Pld | W | D | L | GF | GA | GD | Pts | Qualification |
|---|---|---|---|---|---|---|---|---|---|---|
| 1 | Shonan Bellmare | 6 | 4 | 0 | 2 | 9 | 6 | +3 | 12 | Advance to play-off stage |
| 2 | Avispa Fukuoka | 6 | 3 | 1 | 2 | 6 | 6 | 0 | 10 | Advance to play-off stage |
| 3 | Júbilo Iwata | 6 | 2 | 1 | 3 | 4 | 5 | −1 | 7 | |
| 4 | FC Tokyo | 6 | 1 | 2 | 3 | 4 | 6 | −2 | 5 | |

Source: JLeague.co (EN), JLeague.jp (JA)
Rules for classification: Tiebreakers

| 23 February 2022 | Shonan Bellmare | 3–1 | Avispa Fukuoka | Hiratsuka |
| 15:03 | Yamada 14'; Sugioka 45+1'; Ohashi 88' | JLeague.co (EN); JLeague.jp (JA) | Jogo 79' | Stadium: Lemon Gas Stadium Hiratsuka; Attendance: 4,770; Referee: Takafumi Mikuriya |

| 2 March 2022 | Júbilo Iwata | 0–1 | Shonan Bellmare | Iwata |
| 19:03 | | JLeague.co (EN); JLeague.jp (JA) | Ikeda 43' | Stadium: Yamaha Stadium; Attendance: 4,012; Referee: Yoshiro Imamura |

| 2 March 2022 | Avispa Fukuoka | 1–0 | FC Tokyo | Fukuoka |
| 19:03 | Tanaka 22' | JLeague.co (EN); JLeague.jp (JA) | | Stadium: Best Denki Stadium; Attendance: 2,628; Referee: Futoshi Nakamura |

| 15 March 2022 (Note: Originally was to be held on 23 February 2022, the match was postponed due to the COVID-19 outbreak in the FC Tokyo squad.) | FC Tokyo | 0–0 | Júbilo Iwata | Chōfu |
| 19:03 | | JLeague.co (EN); JLeague.jp (JA) | | Stadium: Ajinomoto Stadium; Attendance: 7,817; Referee: Takuto Okabe |

| 26 March 2022 | Júbilo Iwata | 1–0 | Avispa Fukuoka | Iwata |
| 14:03 | Kaneko 53' | JLeague.co (EN); JLeague.jp (JA) | | Stadium: Yamaha Stadium; Attendance: 4,613; Referee: Yudai Yamamoto |

| 26 March 2022 | FC Tokyo | 2–1 | Shonan Bellmare | Chōfu |
| 15:03 | Abe 39'; Mita 60' | JLeague.co (EN); JLeague.jp (JA) | Ikeda 77' | Stadium: Ajinomoto Stadium; Attendance: 6,829; Referee: Ryo Tanimoto |

| 13 April 2022 | Shonan Bellmare | 2–1 | FC Tokyo | Hiratsuka |
| 19:03 | Ikeda 37'; Machino 73' (pen.) | JLeague.co (EN); JLeague.jp (JA) | Ogawa 50' | Stadium: Lemon Gas Stadium Hiratsuka; Attendance: 3,920; Referee: Keigo Sendachi |

| 13 April 2022 | Avispa Fukuoka | 2–1 | Júbilo Iwata | Fukuoka |
| 19:03 | Lukian 72'; Shigehiro 86' | JLeague.co (EN); JLeague.jp (JA) | Matsumoto 66' | Stadium: Best Denki Stadium; Attendance: 1,971; Referee: Takafumi Mikuriya |

| 23 April 2022 | Avispa Fukuoka | 2–1 | Shonan Bellmare | Fukuoka |
| 14:03 | Croux 55'; Juanma 61' | JLeague.co (EN); JLeague.jp (JA) | Yamada 22' | Stadium: Best Denki Stadium; Attendance: 2,619; Referee: Hajime Matsuo |

| 23 April 2022 | Júbilo Iwata | 2–1 | FC Tokyo | Iwata |
| 15:03 | González 68'; Kanuma 90+7' | JLeague.co (EN); JLeague.jp (JA) | Kajiura 55' | Stadium: Yamaha Stadium; Attendance: 5,422; Referee: Tomohiro Inoue |

| 18 May 2022 | FC Tokyo | 0–0 | Avispa Fukuoka | Chōfu |
| 19:03 | | JLeague.co (EN); JLeague.jp (JA) | | Stadium: Ajinomoto Stadium; Attendance: 4,532; Referee: Tomohiro Inoue |

| 18 May 2022 | Shonan Bellmare | 1–0 | Júbilo Iwata | Hiratsuka |
| 19:03 | Ikeda 54' | JLeague.co (EN); JLeague.jp (JA) | | Stadium: Lemon Gas Stadium Hiratsuka; Attendance: 4,132; Referee: Yosuke Kubota |

== Play-off stage ==
=== Summary ===
The play-off stage was played as two-legged ties of two teams each. The away goals rule, an extra time (away goals rule not applied for the scores in the extra time), and a penalty shoot-out were used if needed.

The play-off stage was held over two legs; on 4 (first), and 11 June 2022 (second). All times listed are in Japan Standard Time (JST, UTC+9).

| Team 1 | Agg. | Team 2 | 1st leg | 2nd leg |
|---|---|---|---|---|
| Kashima Antlers | 2–2 (a) | Avispa Fukuoka | 0–1 | 2–1 |
| Sanfrecce Hiroshima | 4–1 | Hokkaido Consadole Sapporo | 3–0 | 1–1 |
| Kyoto Sanga | 1–7 | Nagoya Grampus | 1–6 | 0–1 |
| Shonan Bellmare | 1–5 | Cerezo Osaka | 0–1 | 1–4 |

=== Matches ===
4 June 2022
18:03

| Avispa Fukuoka | 1–0 | Kashima Antlers |
|---|---|---|
| Yamagishi 23' | JLeague.co (EN); JLeague.jp (JA) |

Best Denki Stadium, Fukuoka
Attendance: 3,316
Referee: Takafumi Mikuriya
11 June 2022
15:03

| Kashima Antlers | 2–1 | Avispa Fukuoka |
|---|---|---|
| Everaldo 34'; Nakama 40' | JLeague.co (EN); JLeague.jp (JA) | Yamagishi 45+5' |

Kashima Soccer Stadium, Kashima
Attendance: 9,085
Referee: Akihiko Ikeuchi

2–2 on aggregate. Avispa Fukuoka won on away goals.

4 June 2022
14:03

| Hokkaido Consadole Sapporo | 0–3 | Sanfrecce Hiroshima |
|---|---|---|
| | JLeague.co (EN); JLeague.jp (JA) | Higashi 24'; Júnior Santos 65', 87' |

Sapporo Dome, Sapporo
Attendance: 5,716
Referee: Tomohiro Inoue
11 June 2022
16:03

| Sanfrecce Hiroshima | 1–1 | Hokkaido Consadole Sapporo |
|---|---|---|
| Mitsuta 87' | JLeague.co (EN); JLeague.jp (JA) | Aoki 34' |

Edion Stadium Hiroshima, Hiroshima
Attendance: 4,669
Referee: Koichiro Fukushima

Sanfrecce Hiroshima won 4–1 on aggregate.

4 June 2022
16:03

| Nagoya Grampus | 6–1 | Kyoto Sanga |
|---|---|---|
| Inagaki 15', 49'; Maruyama 63'; Mateus 73', 81'; Soma 90+2' | JLeague.co (EN); JLeague.jp (JA) | Yamasaki 58' |

CS-asset Minato Stadium, Nagoya
Attendance: 5,234
Referee: Koei Koya
11 June 2022
18:33

| Kyoto Sanga | 0–1 | Nagoya Grampus |
|---|---|---|
| | JLeague.co (EN); JLeague.jp (JA) | Saitō 90+1' |

Sanga Stadium by Kyocera, Kameoka
Attendance: 5,831
Referee: Takuto Okabe

Nagoya Grampus won 7–1 on aggregate.

4 June 2022
16:03

| Cerezo Osaka | 1–0 | Shonan Bellmare |
|---|---|---|
| Toriumi 81' | JLeague.co (EN); JLeague.jp (JA) |

Yodoko Sakura Stadium, Osaka
Attendance: 6,246
Referee: Masuya Ueda
11 June 2022
18:03

| Shonan Bellmare | 1–4 | Cerezo Osaka |
|---|---|---|
| Machino 83' | JLeague.co (EN); JLeague.jp (JA) | Jonjić 10'; Tameda 13'; Kiyotake 45+3'; Okuno 48' |

Lemon Gas Stadium Hiratsuka, Hiratsuka
Attendance: 4,301
Referee: Futoshi Nakamura

Cerezo Osaka won 5–1 on aggregate.

== Quarter-finals ==
The quarter-finals were played between four play-off winners and four teams qualified for the 2022 AFC Champions League as two-legged ties of two teams each. The away goals rule, an extra time (away goals rule not applied for the scores in the extra time), and a penalty shoot-out were used if needed.

The quarter-finals were held over two legs; on 3 (first) and 10 August 2022 (second). All times listed are in Japan Standard Time (JST, UTC+9). The draw was held on 29 June.

=== Summary ===
| Team 1 | Agg. | Team 2 | 1st leg | 2nd leg |
|---|---|---|---|---|
| Urawa Red Diamonds | 4–1 | Nagoya Grampus | 1–1 | 3–0 |
| Kawasaki Frontale | 3–3 (a) | Cerezo Osaka | 1–1 | 2–2 |
| Yokohama F. Marinos | 2–5 | Sanfrecce Hiroshima | 3–1 | 1–2 |
| Avispa Fukuoka | 3–1 | Vissel Kobe | 1–2 | 1–0 |

=== Matches ===
3 August 2022
19:33

| Nagoya Grampus | 1–1 | Urawa Red Diamonds |
|---|---|---|
| Morishita 59' | JLeague.co (EN); JLeague.jp (JA) | Matsuo 36' |

Toyota Stadium, Aichi
Attendance: 6,179
Referee: Ryo Tanimoto
10 August 2022
19:33

| Urawa Red Diamonds | 3–0 | Nagoya Grampus |
|---|---|---|
| Ito 31', 41'; Esaka 86' | JLeague.co (EN); JLeague.jp (JA) |

Saitama Stadium 2002, Saitama
Attendance: 23,435
Referee: Yuichi Nishimura

Urawa Red Diamonds won 4–1 on aggregate.

3 August 2022
19:03

| Cerezo Osaka | 1–1 | Kawasaki Frontale |
|---|---|---|
| Taggart 89' | JLeague.co (EN); JLeague.jp (JA) | Wakizaka 33' |

Yodoko Sakura Stadium, Osaka
Attendance: 9,998
Referee: Yuichi Nishimura
10 August 2022
19:03

| Kawasaki Frontale | 2–2 | Cerezo Osaka |
|---|---|---|
| Marcinho 40', 53' | JLeague.co (EN); JLeague.jp (JA) | Kato 90'; Yamada 90+6' |

Kawasaki Todoroki Stadium, Kawasaki
Attendance: 13,877
Referee: Takuto Okabe

3–3 on aggregate. Cerezo Osaka won on away goals.

3 August 2022
19:03

| Sanfrecce Hiroshima | 3–1 | Yokohama F. Marinos |
|---|---|---|
| Kashiwa 14'; Araki 71'; Notsuda 90+8' | JLeague.co (EN); JLeague.jp (JA) | Léo Ceará 46' |

EDION Stadium Hiroshima, Hiroshima
Attendance: 5,650
Referee: Koichiro Fukushima
10 August 2022
19:03

| Yokohama F. Marinos | 1–2 | Sanfrecce Hiroshima |
|---|---|---|
| Ceará 22' | JLeague.co (EN); JLeague.jp (JA) | Ben Khalifa 8'; Nogami 37' |

NHK Spring Mitsuzawa Football Stadium, Yokohama
Attendance: 9,255
Referee: Hajime Matsuo

Sanfrecce Hiroshima won 5–2 on aggregate.

3 August 2022
19:03

| Vissel Kobe | 1–2 | Avispa Fukuoka |
|---|---|---|
| Osako 90+9' | JLeague.co (EN); JLeague.jp (JA) | Mary 44'; Lukian 58' |

Noevir Stadium Kobe, Kobe
Attendance: 5,647
Referee: Akihiko Ikeuchi
10 August 2022
19:03

| Avispa Fukuoka | 1–0 | Vissel Kobe |
|---|---|---|
| Lukian 43' | JLeague.co (EN); JLeague.jp (JA) |

Best Denki Stadium, Fukuoka
Attendance: 7,021
Referee: Futoshi Nakamura

Avispa Fukuoka won 3–1 on aggregate.

== Semi-finals ==
The semi-finals were played between four quarter-final winners as two-legged ties of two teams each. The away goals rule, an extra time (away goals rule not applied for the scores in the extra time), and a penalty shoot-out would have been used if needed.

The semi-finals were held over two legs; on 21 (first) and 25 September 2022 (second). All times listed are in Japan Standard Time (JST, UTC+9). The draw was held on 10 August.

=== Summary ===
| Team 1 | Agg. | Team 2 | 1st leg | 2nd leg |
|---|---|---|---|---|
| Urawa Red Diamonds | 1–5 | Cerezo Osaka | 1–1 | 0–4 |
| Sanfrecce Hiroshima | 3–2 | Avispa Fukuoka | 2–3 | 0–0 |

=== Matches ===
21 September 2022
19:03

| Cerezo Osaka | 1–1 | Urawa Red Diamonds |
|---|---|---|
| Uejo 2' | JLeague.co (EN); JLeague.jp (JA) | Koizumi 53' |

Yodoko Sakura Stadium, Osaka
Attendance: 10,399
Referee: Hajime Matsuo
25 September 2022
17:03

| Urawa Red Diamonds | 0–4 | Cerezo Osaka |
|---|---|---|
| | JLeague.co (EN); JLeague.jp (JA) | Akimoto 23' (o.g.); Okuno 30'; Kato 51'; Patric 80' |

Saitama Stadium 2002, Saitama
Attendance: 26,899
Referee: Koichiro Fukushima

Cerezo Osaka won 5–1 on aggregate.

21 September 2022
19:03

| Avispa Fukuoka | 2–3 | Sanfrecce Hiroshima |
|---|---|---|
| Juanma 72', 90+4' | JLeague.co (EN); JLeague.jp (JA) | Kawamura 22', 55'; Shiotani 49' |

Best Denki Stadium, Fukuoka
Attendance: 3,367
Referee: Yoshiro Imamura
25 September 2022
17:03

| Sanfrecce Hiroshima | 0–0 | Avispa Fukuoka |
|---|---|---|
| | JLeague.co (EN); JLeague.jp (JA) |

EDION Stadium Hiroshima, Hiroshima
Attendance: 11,487
Referee: Hiroki Kasahara

Sanfrecce Hiroshima won 3–2 on aggregate.

== Final ==
This was Cerezo Osaka's third J.League Cup final and was seeking their second J.League Cup title (fifth with JSL Cup). This was also Sanfrecce Hiroshima's third J.League Cup final, losing the previous two.

22 October 2022
13:11

| Cerezo Osaka | 1–2 | Sanfrecce Hiroshima |
|---|---|---|
| Kato 53' | JLeague.co (EN); JLeague.jp (JA) | Sotiriou 90+6' (pen.), 90+11' |

Japan National Stadium, Tokyo
Attendance: 39,608
Referee: Yudai Yamamoto

== Top scorers ==
| Rank | Player | Club | Goals |
|---|---|---|---|
| 1 | (Brazil) Júnior Santos | Sanfrecce Hiroshima | 6 |
| 2 | (Japan) Mutsuki Kato | Cerezo Osaka | 5 |
| 3 | (Japan) Masaki Ikeda | Shonan Bellmare | 4 |
| 3 | (Japan) Yugo Masukake | Kashiwa Reysol | 4 |
| 3 | (Japan) Taika Nakashima | Hokkaido Consadole Sapporo | 4 |
| 6 | (Spain) Juanma | Avispa Fukuoka | 3 |
| 6 | (Japan) Sota Kitano | Cerezo Osaka | 3 |
| 6 | (Brazil) Lukian | Avispa Fukuoka | 3 |
| 6 | (Brazil) Mateus | Nagoya Grampus | 3 |
| 6 | (Japan) Shun Nagasawa | Oita Trinita | 3 |
| 6 | (Japan) Hirotaka Tameda | Cerezo Osaka | 3 |
| 6 | (Japan) Ayase Ueda | Kashima Antlers | 3 |
