= 2021 J.League Cup final =

2021ＪリーグYBCルヴァンカップ 決勝
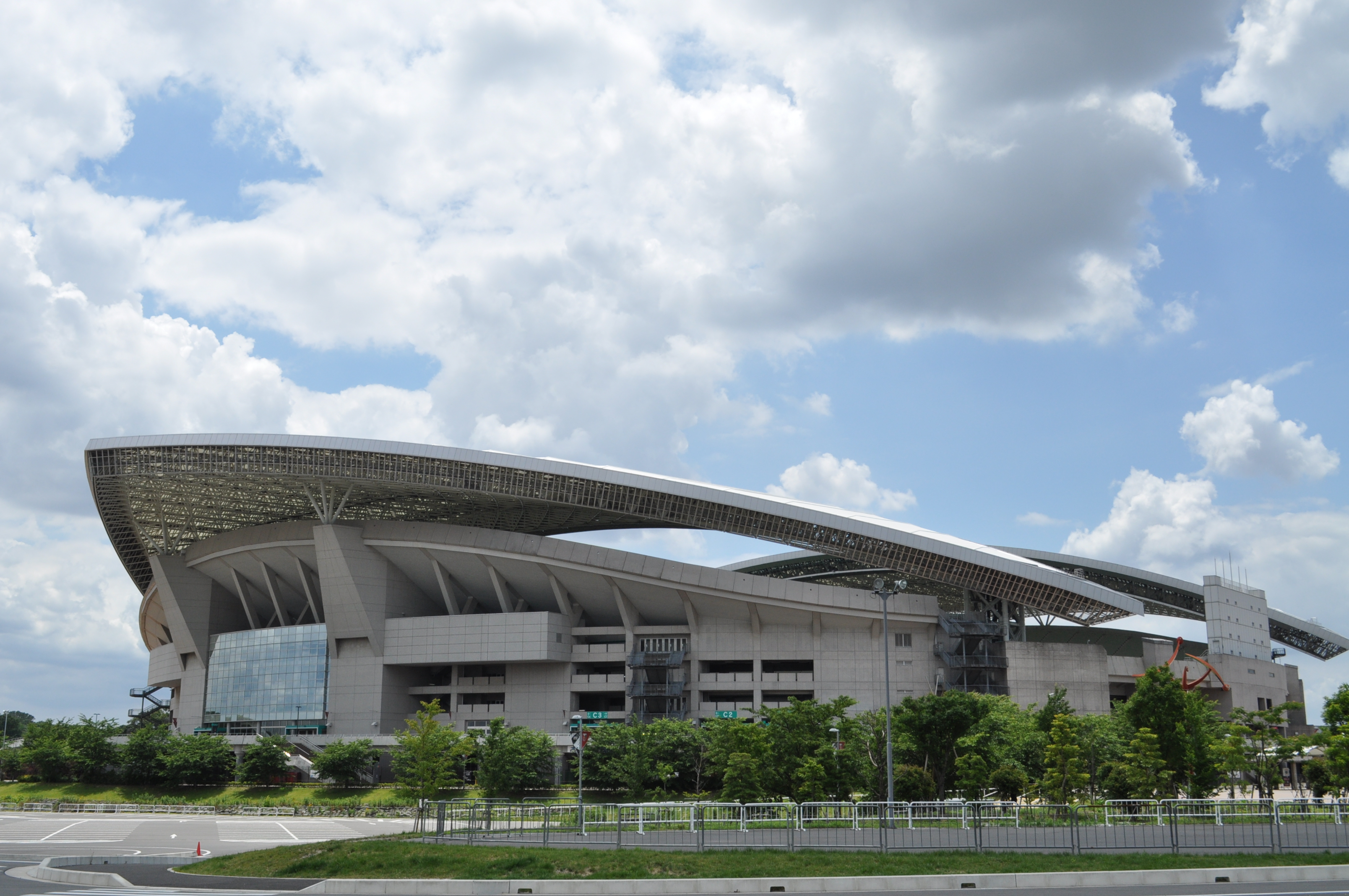
- The match took place at Saitama Stadium 2002
- Event: 2021 J.League Cup
Nagoya Grampus	Cerezo Osaka
2	0
- Date: 30 October 2021
- Venue: Saitama Stadium 2002, Saitama
- Man of the Match: Sho Inagaki
- Referee: Masaaki Toma
- Attendance: 17,933
- Weather: Sunny; 18.9 °C (66 °F)

The 2021 J.League Cup final was an association football match between Nagoya Grampus and Cerezo Osaka on 30 October 2021 at Saitama Stadium 2002. It was the 29th edition J.League Cup, organised by the J.League. Nagoya Grampus were playing in their first ever J.League Cup final. Cerezo Osaka were making their second J.League Cup final appearance after winning the competition in 2017.

Masaaki Toma was the referee for the match, which was played in front of 17,933 spectators. After a goalless first half, Nagoya Grampus scored just after half time through Naoki Maeda and doubled their lead after 79 minutes following a goal from Sho Inagaki. Nagoya held on to claim victory and be crowned champions for the first time in their history.

== Teams ==
Team	League	Previous finals appearances (bold indicates winners)
Nagoya Grampus	J1 League	0
Cerezo Osaka	J1 League	1 (**2017**)

== Route to the final ==
The tournament consisted of all 20 J1 League teams, beginning with a group stage consisting of four groups of four teams. The top two teams of each group would then advance to a two-legged play-off stage. The winners of the play-offs would then be entered into a final knockout stage, alongside four teams that received byes due to their commitments in the 2021 AFC Champions League group stage.

Nagoya Grampus				Round	Cerezo Osaka			
Bye				Group stage	Bye			
Opponent	Agg.	1st leg	2nd leg	Knockout phase	Opponent	Agg.	1st leg	2nd leg
Bye				Play-off stage	Bye			
Kashima Antlers	4–0	2–0 (H)	0–2 (A)	Quarter-finals	Gamba Osaka	4–1	0–1 (H)	0–4 (A)
FC Tokyo	4–3	3–1 (H)	1–2 (A)	Semi-finals	Urawa Red Diamonds	2–1	1–1 (A)	1–0 (H)

== Pre-match ==
=== Venue selection ===
The final was hosted at Saitama Stadium 2002, a return to the venue following the 2020 final being held at the newly reconstructed national stadium. The game was played in front of a reduced capacity crowd with Japan still trialling measures to reduce the spread of COVID-19.

=== Analysis ===
The final was Nagoya's first after eight previous semi-final exits dating back to 1992. Osaka won the competition in 2017. The two teams had already played each other earlier in the week in an Emperor's Cup quarter-final game in which Cerezo Osaka breezed to a 3–0 victory. In their meeting in the 2021 J1 League in May, it was Nagoya who came out on top in a 1–0 home win. Both teams had a relatively even head-to-head record coming into the final – Nagoya winning 5 and Osaka winning 3 of their previous 10 meetings. In the 2021 season, Nagoya had won 17, drawn 2 and lost only 1 league game in which they had scored the first goal. On the other hand, they had not won after falling behind in any game in the season, so scoring first would be paramount for Nagoya. Cerezo Osaka had been strong in scoring goals from set-pieces and Nagoya had conceded set-piece goals in four consecutive games, so this would be another point of concern for Grampus.

== Match ==
Nagoya Grampus lined up in a 4–2–3–1 formation, with their seasons top-scorer Mateus starting the game on the right-wing and cup top-scorer Sho Inagaki in central midfield. Other changes in personnel from their earlier Emperor's Cup defeat include forward Jakub Świerczok dropping to the bench in place of Naoki Maeda and Kim Min-tae returning to centre-back after an injury lay-off. Yasuki Kimoto had made over 100 appearances for Cerezo Osaka before transferring to Nagoya for the 2021 season and striker Yoichiro Kakitani would also be facing his former team. Ever-present defender Shinnosuke Nakatani captained the side.

Cerezo Osaka retained only three players from their earlier 3–0 victory in the Emperor's Cup: goalkeeper Kim Jin-hyeon, Hiroaki Okuno and Hiroto Yamada. Most of their first choice players returned to the starting XI including top-scorer Mutsuki Kato and centre-back pairing Ayumu Seko and Yusuke Maruhashi. Cerezo lined up in 4–4–2 formation with Kim Jin-hyeon as captain.

=== First half ===
The best chances of the first-half fell to Nagoya Grampus, with Mateus causing problems for Osaka down the right-hand side. His 11th-minute cross found Kakitani in the centre of the box who ambitiously attempted a bicycle kick that just flew over the crossbar. As the half progressed, Cerezo Osaka started to dominate the ball but couldn't break down an organised Grampus defence. With Nagoya's counter-attacks also nullified, the half ended goalless.

=== Second half ===
Osaka made a halftime substitution, with Hiroshi Kiyotake replacing Hiroto Yamada. However, this did not produce the desired effect as Nagoya managed to take the lead shortly after half-time following an in-swinging corner Yuki Soma. The ball was aimed at the near-post and was flicked on by the head of Kakitani. Maeda was able to stoop low to head the ball into the net from a metre out. Nagoya then began to play a defensive and counter-attacking game which Osaka struggled to break down and Nagoya seemed to have little problem containing their attackers. To try and gain some momentum, it wasn't long before Osaka turned to their veteran striker Yoshito Okubo from the bench, replacing Kato in the 55th minute. Nagoya went on to make some tactical substitutions in the 58th minute, switching to a five at the back formation to attempt to completely shut out the Osaka attack. Osaka did have chances – in the 75th minute defender Riku Matsuda grazed the left-post with a fierce shot from mid-way in the Grampus half and three minutes later almost set-up Okubo for a sliding finish which narrowly missed. Only moments later, Nagoya attacked Osaka down the left-hand side through substitutes Saito and Świerczok, with the latter having a left-footed attempt on goal saved by the Osaka goalkeeper. The rebound fell to an on-rushing Inagaki who hit a half-volley into the top corner of the goal to give Nagoya a two-goal lead. Cerezo were unable to respond in the final period of the game due to the strength of Nagoya's defensive tactics and the game finished 2–0, with Nagoya winning their first ever J.League Cup title.

=== Details ===
30 October 2021
13:09 JST

Nagoya Grampus	2–0	Cerezo Osaka
Maeda 47'; Inagaki 79'	Report

Saitama Stadium 2002, Saitama
Attendance: 17,933
Referee: Masaaki Toma

GK	1	(Australia) Mitchell Langerak
DF	6	(Japan) Kazuya Miyahara
DF	4	(Japan) Shinnosuke Nakatani (c)
DF	20	(South Korea) Kim Min-tae
DF	23	(Japan) Yutaka Yoshida
MF	15	(Japan) Sho Inagaki
MF	14	(Japan) Yasuki Kimoto	(substituted off) 81'
FW	16	(Brazil) Mateus
FW	25	(Japan) Naoki Maeda	(substituted off) 58'
FW	11	(Japan) Yuki Soma	(substituted off) 58'
FW	8	(Japan) Yoichiro Kakitani	(substituted off) 73'
Substitutes:
GK	21	(Japan) Yohei Takeda
DF	17	(Japan) Ryoya Morishita	(substituted in) 81'
MF	5	(Japan) Kazuki Nagasawa	(substituted in) 58'
FW	10	(Brazil) Gabriel Xavier
FW	19	(Japan) Manabu Saito	(substituted in) 58'
FW	40	(Poland) Jakub Świerczok	(substituted in) 73'
FW	44	(Japan) Mu Kanazaki
Manager:
(Italy) Massimo Ficcadenti

GK	21	(South Korea) Kim Jin-hyeon (c)
DF	2	(Japan) Riku Matsuda
DF	33	(Japan) Ryuya Nishio
DF	15	(Japan) Ayumu Seko
DF	14	(Japan) Yusuke Maruhashi
MF	17	(Japan) Tatsuhiro Sakamoto
MF	25	(Japan) Hiroaki Okuno	(substituted off) 75'
MF	4	(Japan) Riki Harakawa
MF	23	(Japan) Takashi Inui
FW	34	(Japan) Hiroto Yamada	(substituted off) 46'
FW	29	(Japan) Mutsuki Kato	(substituted off) 55'
Substitutes:
GK	50	(Japan) Kenya Matsui
DF	3	(Japan) Ryosuke Shindo
MF	5	(Japan) Naoyuki Fujita
MF	10	(Japan) Hiroshi Kiyotake	(substituted in) 46'
FW	20	(Japan) Yoshito Okubo	(substituted in) 55'
FW	22	(Japan) Riki Matsuda
FW	32	(Japan) Yuta Toyokawa	(substituted in) 75'
Manager:
(Japan) Akio Kogiku

Assistant referees:
Gakushi Karakami
Kota Watanabe
Fourth official:
Shinji Murakami

**Match rules**

- 90 minutes.
- 30 minutes of extra-time if necessary.
- Penalty shoot-out if scores still level.
- Seven named substitutes.
- Maximum of three substitutions.

=== Statistics ===
Statistic	Nagoya Grampus	Cerezo Osaka
Goals scored	2	0
Total shots	8	10
Corner kicks	4	3
Fouls committed	11	15
Yellow cards	0	0
Red cards	0	0

== Post-match ==
By winning the match, Nagoya Grampus won the competition for the first time in their history, in their first finals appearance. It was their first piece of silverware since winning the league in 2010. Massimo Ficcadenti, the winning manager, said "At the end of the first half we were under a lot of pressure, and it was good to score as early as we did in the second half because it gave us energy". This was Ficcadenti's first trophy in Japan after managing in the country for eight years. He said "More than talking about the game itself, I want to enjoy the feeling of winning the title." His opposite number, Akio Kogiku said "It was a disappointing result, but the players kept the discipline of offense and defense that I have cherished over the past two months and fought until the final whistle blew."

Goal scorer and MVP Sho Inagaki said "We stuck it out together as a team, and we were able to move the game into the direction we wanted, and all of that went into that goal." Inagaki also ended as one of the top-scorers in the whole competition, with 4 goals overall. Cerezo Osaka forward Takashi Inui said "I feel frustrated and sorry for the players who couldn't play and the supporters who cheered me on."

The monetary reward to Nagoya Grampus for winning the trophy was JPY150,000,000, with runners-up Cerezo Osaka awarded JPY50,000,000.

For his performance and goal in the final, Sho Inagaki was awarded the MVP award and received a prize of JPY1,000,000.

As winners, Nagoya Grampus were due to play the winners of the 2021 Copa Sudamericana, Athletico Paranaense, in the 2022 J.League Cup / Copa Sudamericana Championship, however this game was not played due to a scheduling clash with the 2022 EAFF E-1 Football Championship.
