= 2021 J.League Cup =

2021 JリーグYBCルヴァンカップ

Tournament details
- Country: Japan
- Dates: 2 March – 30 October
- Teams: 16 (group stage); 20 (total)

Final positions
- Champions: Nagoya Grampus (1st title)
- Runners-up: Cerezo Osaka

Tournament statistics
- Matches played: 69
- Goals scored: 172 (2.49 per match)
- Top goal scorer(s): (Japan) Sho Inagaki (Denmark) Kasper Junker (Japan) Teruhito Nakagawa (Brazil) Adaílton (4 goals each)

The 2021 J.League Cup, known as the 2021 J.League YBC Levain Cup (Japanese: 2021 JリーグYBCルヴァンカップ) for sponsorship reasons, was the 29th edition of J.League Cup, a Japanese association football cup competition. It began on 2 March 2021 and ended on 30 October that year.

FC Tokyo were the cup holders, having won their third title. They failed to defend their title after being eliminated by eventual winners Nagoya Grampus in the semi-finals. Nagoya Grampus won their first ever J.League Cup title, defeating one-time winners Cerezo Osaka in the final.

== Format ==
All 20 teams playing in the 2021 J1 League participated. Four clubs involved in the 2021 AFC Champions League received byes for the group and playoff stages: Kawasaki Frontale, Gamba Osaka, Nagoya Grampus, and Cerezo Osaka.

Sixteen teams played in the group stage. They were divided into four groups of four teams by their finish on the 2020 J1 and J2 Leagues (parenthesized below).

- Group A: Kashima Antlers (J1 5th), Consadole Sapporo (J1 12th), Sagan Tosu (J1 13th), Avispa Fukuoka (J2 2nd).
- Group B: FC Tokyo (J1 6th), Oita Trinita (J1 11th), Vissel Kobe (J1 14th), Tokushima Vortis (J2 1st).
- Group C: Kashiwa Reysol (J1 7th), Urawa Red Diamonds (J1 10th), Yokohama FC (J1 15th), Shonan Bellmare (J1 18th).
- Group D: Sanfrecce Hiroshima (J1 8th), Yokohama F. Marinos (J1 9th), Shimizu S-Pulse (J1 16th), Vegalta Sendai (J1 17th).

== Schedule ==
Stage	Round	Date
Group stage	Matchday 1	2–3 March 2021
Group stage	Matchday 2	27–28 March 2021
Group stage	Matchday 3	20–21 April 2021
Group stage	Matchday 4	28 April 2021
Group stage	Matchday 5	5 May 2021
Group stage	Matchday 6	19 May 2021
Play-off stage		2, 5, 6 June 2021 (first leg); 6, 13 June 2021 (second leg)
Prime stage
Prime stage	Quarter-finals	1 September 2021 (first leg); 5 September 2021 (second leg)
Prime stage	Semi-finals	6 October 2021 (first leg); 10 October 2021 (second leg)
Prime stage	Final	30 October 2021

== Group stage ==
Each group were played on a home-and-away round-robin basis. Each match were played in 90 minutes.

All times listed are in Japan Standard Time (JST, UTC+9).

=== Tiebreakers ===
In the group stage, teams in a group were ranked by points (3 points for a win, 1 point for a draw, 0 points for a loss). If the points were tied, the following tiebreakers were applied accordingly:

1. Points in head-to-head matches among tied teams;
2. Goal difference in head-to-head matches among tied teams;
3. Goals scored in head-to-head matches among tied teams;
4. Away goals scored in head-to-head matches among tied teams;
5. If more than two teams are tied, and applying all head-to-head criteria above remains a part of teams still tied, reapply the criteria above only for the tied teams.
6. Goal difference in all group matches;
7. Goals scored in all group matches;
8. Penalty shoot-out if only two teams are tied and they met in the last round of the group;
9. Fewer disciplinary points;
10. Drawing of lots.

=== Group A ===
Pos	Team	Pld	W	D	L	GF	GA	GD	Pts	Qualification
1	Kashima Antlers	6	3	3	0	14	4	+10	12	Advance to play-off stage
2	Consadole Sapporo	6	3	2	1	11	8	+3	11	Advance to play-off stage
3	Avispa Fukuoka	6	2	2	2	10	11	−1	8	
4	Sagan Tosu	6	0	1	5	5	17	−12	1	

Source: J.League
Rules for classification: Tiebreakers

3 March 2021	Avispa Fukuoka	2–3	Consadole Sapporo	Fukuoka
18:03	Mikuni 18'; Jogo 88'	Report	Douglas 15' (pen.), 35'; Nakashima 41'	Stadium: Best Denki Stadium; Attendance: 1,564; Referee: Hajime Matsuo

3 March 2021	Kashima Antlers	3–0	Sagan Tosu	Kashima
19:03	Everaldo 10'; Izumi 64'; Someno 71'	Report		Stadium: Kashima Soccer Stadium; Attendance: 3,784; Referee: Hayato Shimizu

27 March 2021	Sagan Tosu	1–5	Consadole Sapporo	Tosu
14:03	Tashiro 67'	Report	Yamashita 8' (o.g.); Matsumoto 9' (o.g.); Fukai 37'; Anderson Lopes 56'; Fernandes 86'	Stadium: Ekimae Real Estate Stadium; Attendance: 4,399; Referee: Futoshi Nakamura

27 March 2021	Avispa Fukuoka	1–5	Kashima Antlers	Fukuoka
18:03	Carlos 75'	Report	Ueda 9', 35'; Araki 28'; Everaldo 61'; Hirose 90+1'	Stadium: Best Denki Stadium; Attendance: 3,964; Referee: Ryo Tanimoto

20 April 2021	Kashima Antlers	3–0	Consadole Sapporo	Kashima
19:03	Matsumura 32'; Araki 39'; Shirasaki 81'	Report		Stadium: Kashima Soccer Stadium; Attendance: 4,477; Referee: Hiroyoshi Takayama

21 April 2021	Sagan Tosu	0–1	Avispa Fukuoka	Tosu
19:03		Report	Croux 82'	Stadium: Ekimae Real Estate Stadium; Attendance: 4,227; Referee: Takuto Okabe

28 April 2021	Consadole Sapporo	1–1	Avispa Fukuoka	Sapporo
19:03	Anderson Lopes 84'	Report	Mary 90+4'	Stadium: Sapporo Dome; Attendance: 4,446; Referee: Yuichi Nishimura

28 April 2021	Sagan Tosu	2–2	Kashima Antlers	Tosu
19:03	Ofoedu 14'; Yuzawa 73'	Report	Sugioka 29'; Sagara 45+1' (o.g.)	Stadium: Ekimae Real Estate Stadium; Attendance: 3,402; Referee: Yoshiro Imamura

5 May 2021	Consadole Sapporo	2–1	Sagan Tosu	Sapporo
14:03	Douglas 26' (pen.); Aoki 60'	Report	Yuzawa 90+1'	Stadium: Sapporo Dome; Attendance: 7,507; Referee: Nobutsugu Murakami

5 May 2021	Kashima Antlers	1–1	Avispa Fukuoka	Kashima
15:03	Shirasaki 31'	Report	Mary 24'	Stadium: Kashima Soccer Stadium; Attendance: 8,343; Referee: Futoshi Nakamura

19 May 2021	Consadole Sapporo	0–0	Kashima Antlers	Sapporo
19:03		Report		Stadium: Sapporo Dome; Attendance: 2,829; Referee: Yoshiro Imamura

19 May 2021	Avispa Fukuoka	4–1	Sagan Tosu	Fukuoka
19:03	Jogo 8', 56'; Ishizu 60'; Juanma 72'	Report	Hayashi 74'	Stadium: Best Denki Stadium; Attendance: 979; Referee: Akihiko Ikeuchi

=== Group B ===
Pos	Team	Pld	W	D	L	GF	GA	GD	Pts	Qualification
1	FC Tokyo	6	3	3	0	6	2	+4	12	Advance to play-off stage
2	Vissel Kobe	6	2	2	2	6	4	+2	8	Advance to play-off stage
3	Oita Trinita	6	1	3	2	4	6	−2	6	
4	Tokushima Vortis	6	1	2	3	3	7	−4	5	

Source: J.League
Rules for classification: Tiebreakers

2 March 2021	Oita Trinita	1–3	Vissel Kobe	Ōita
19:03	Fujimoto 20'	Report	Masuyama 44'; Nakasaka 51'; Tanaka 81'	Stadium: Showa Denko Dome Oita; Attendance: 3,320; Referee: Hiroki Kasahara

3 March 2021	FC Tokyo	1–0	Tokushima Vortis	Chōfu
18:03	Tagawa 59'	Report		Stadium: Ajinomoto Stadium; Attendance: 3,788; Referee: Takuto Okabe

27 March 2021	Tokushima Vortis	0–1	Oita Trinita	Naruto
14:03		Report	Nagasawa 5'	Stadium: Pocarisweat Stadium; Attendance: 2,322; Referee: Yuichi Nishimura

28 March 2021	FC Tokyo	2–0	Vissel Kobe	Chōfu
14:03	Diego Oliveira 11'; Mita 14'	Report		Stadium: Ajinomoto Stadium; Attendance: 6,512; Referee: Hajime Matsuo

21 April 2021	Vissel Kobe	0–1	Tokushima Vortis	Kobe
18:03		Report	Kawata 30'	Stadium: Noevir Stadium Kobe; Attendance: 2,184; Referee: Dai Matsumoto

21 April 2021	Oita Trinita	0–1	FC Tokyo	Ōita
19:03		Report	Nagai 50'	Stadium: Showa Denko Dome Oita; Attendance: 2,806; Referee: Akihiko Ikeuchi

28 April 2021	Vissel Kobe	0–0	Oita Trinita	Kobe
18:03		Report		Stadium: Noevir Stadium Kobe; Referee: Nobutsugu Murakami

28 April 2021	Tokushima Vortis	1–1	FC Tokyo	Naruto
19:03	Hamashita 12'	Report	Uvini 47'	Stadium: Pocarisweat Stadium; Attendance: 1,969; Referee: Yudai Yamamoto

5 May 2021	Oita Trinita	1–1	Tokushima Vortis	Ōita
14:03	Takazawa 14'	Report	Cacá 84'	Stadium: Showa Denko Dome Oita; Attendance: 3,987; Referee: Masaaki Toma

5 May 2021	Vissel Kobe	0–0	FC Tokyo	Kashima
15:03		Report		Stadium: Kashima Soccer Stadium; Referee: Hiroki Kasahara

19 May 2021	FC Tokyo	1–1	Oita Trinita	Chōfu
19:03	Nagai 63'	Report	Yumiba 45+2'	Stadium: Ajinomoto Stadium; Attendance: 2,842; Referee: Yuichi Nishimura

19 May 2021	Tokushima Vortis	0–3	Vissel Kobe	Naruto
19:03		Report	Yamaguchi 2'; Masika 63', 90+3'	Stadium: Pocarisweat Stadium; Attendance: 3,448; Referee: Hajime Matsuo

=== Group C ===
Pos	Team	Pld	W	D	L	GF	GA	GD	Pts	Qualification
1	Urawa Red Diamonds	6	2	3	1	7	5	+2	9	Advance to play-off stage
2	Shonan Bellmare	6	1	5	0	4	3	+1	8	Advance to play-off stage
3	Yokohama FC	6	2	1	3	5	6	−1	7	
4	Kashiwa Reysol	6	1	3	2	6	8	−2	6	

Source: J.League
Rules for classification: Tiebreakers

2 March 2021	Shonan Bellmare	0–0	Urawa Red Diamonds	Hiratsuka
18:03		Report		Stadium: Lemon Gas Stadium Hiratsuka; Attendance: 3,022; Referee: Masaaki Toma

3 March 2021	Kashiwa Reysol	0–1	Yokohama FC	Kashiwa
18:03		Report	S. Ito 51' (pen.)	Stadium: Sankyo Frontier Kashiwa Stadium; Attendance: 2,260; Referee: Ryo Tanimoto

27 March 2021	Shonan Bellmare	1–0	Yokohama FC	Hiratsuka
15:03	Nemoto 47'	Report		Stadium: Lemon Gas Stadium Hiratsuka; Attendance: 4,865; Referee: Ryosuke Yamaoka

27 March 2021	Urawa Red Diamonds	0–1	Kashiwa Reysol	Saitama
15:03		Report	Cristiano 79'	Stadium: Saitama Stadium 2002; Attendance: 8,024; Referee: Nobutsugu Murakami

21 April 2021	Kashiwa Reysol	1–1	Shonan Bellmare	Kashiwa
18:03	Goya 28'	Report	Kobayashi 90'	Stadium: Sankyo Frontier Kashiwa Stadium; Attendance: 2,152; Referee: Yusuke Araki

21 April 2021	Yokohama FC	1–2	Urawa Red Diamonds	Yokohama
19:03	Kléber 14'	Report	Sugimoto 45', 57'	Stadium: NHK Spring Mitsuzawa Football Stadium; Attendance: 2,481; Referee: Masaya Ueda

28 April 2021	Urawa Red Diamonds	0–0	Shonan Bellmare	Saitama
18:03		Report		Stadium: Saitama Stadium 2002; Attendance: 4,231; Referee: Ryo Tanimoto

28 April 2021	Yokohama FC	2–0	Kashiwa Reysol	Yokohama
19:03	Germain 58'; Iwatake 85'	Report		Stadium: NHK Spring Mitsuzawa Football Stadium; Attendance: 1,891; Referee: Shu Kawamata

5 May 2021	Yokohama FC	1–1	Shonan Bellmare	Yokohama
14:03	Kléber 78'	Report	Hiraoka 42'	Stadium: NHK Spring Mitsuzawa Football Stadium; Attendance: 4,004; Referee: Takuto Okabe

5 May 2021	Kashiwa Reysol	3–3	Urawa Red Diamonds	Kashiwa
16:03	Rodrigo 59', 67' (pen.); Koga 90+3'	Report	Junker 9'; A. Ito 90+2'; Sekine 90+3'	Stadium: Sankyo Frontier Kashiwa Stadium; Attendance: 3,775; Referee: Hayato Shimizu

19 May 2021	Urawa Red Diamonds	2–0	Yokohama FC	Saitama
19:03	Sekine 3'; Yuruki 61'	Report		Stadium: Saitama Stadium 2002; Attendance: 4,252; Referee: Koichiro Fukushima

19 May 2021	Shonan Bellmare	1–1	Kashiwa Reysol	Hiratsuka
19:03	Ikeda 50'	Report	Takahashi 90+2'	Stadium: Lemon Gas Stadium Hiratsuka; Attendance: 3,521; Referee: Hiroyoshi Takayama

=== Group D ===
Pos	Team	Pld	W	D	L	GF	GA	GD	Pts	Qualification
1	Yokohama F. Marinos	6	4	2	0	17	4	+13	14	Advance to play-off stage
2	Shimizu S-Pulse	6	2	2	2	7	8	−1	8	Advance to play-off stage
3	Vegalta Sendai	6	2	0	4	7	11	−4	6	
4	Sanfrecce Hiroshima	6	1	2	3	3	11	−8	5	

Source: J.League
Rules for classification: Tiebreakers

3 March 2021	Yokohama F. Marinos	1–0	Vegalta Sendai	Yokohama
18:03	Onaiwu 16'	Report		Stadium: Nissan Stadium; Attendance: 3,851; Referee: Yuki Noda

3 March 2021	Sanfrecce Hiroshima	0–0	Shimizu S-Pulse	Hiroshima
19:03		Report		Stadium: Edion Stadium Hiroshima; Attendance: 1,904; Referee: Jumpei Iida

27 March 2021	Vegalta Sendai	0–1	Shimizu S-Pulse	Sendai
14:03		Report	Yu. Suzuki 70'	Stadium: Yurtec Stadium Sendai; Attendance: 3,196; Referee: Koichiro Fukushima

27 March 2021	Yokohama F. Marinos	5–0	Sanfrecce Hiroshima	Yokohama
14:03	Onaiwu 28', 90'; Nakagawa 53', 64'; Iwata 58'	Report		Stadium: Nissan Stadium; Attendance: 5,600; Referee: Yudai Yamamoto

21 April 2021	Sanfrecce Hiroshima	0–1	Vegalta Sendai	Hiroshima
19:03		Report	C. Kato 75'	Stadium: Edion Stadium Hiroshima; Attendance: 1,739; Referee: Koichiro Fukushima

21 April 2021	Shimizu S-Pulse	0–0	Yokohama F. Marinos	Shizuoka
19:03		Report		Stadium: IAI Stadium Nihondaira; Attendance: 3,466; Referee: Tomohiro Inoue

28 April 2021	Vegalta Sendai	2–5	Yokohama F. Marinos	Sendai
18:03	Minagawa 35'; Kida 90+4'	Report	Amano 8', 47'; Kabayama 33'; Mizunuma 51', 90+3'	Stadium: Yurtec Stadium Sendai; Attendance: 1,953; Referee: Toru Kakinuma

28 April 2021	Shimizu S-Pulse	1–2	Sanfrecce Hiroshima	Shizuoka
19:03	Ibusuki 69'	Report	Naganuma 37'; Valdo 48' (o.g.)	Stadium: IAI Stadium Nihondaira; Attendance: 3,511; Referee: Futoshi Nakamura

5 May 2021	Shimizu S-Pulse	4–1	Vegalta Sendai	Shizuoka
14:03	Fukumori 41'; Kaneko 45+1' (pen.); Disaró 48'; Nakayama 89'	Report	Sasaki 36'	Stadium: IAI Stadium Nihondaira; Attendance: 5,376; Referee: Kazuyoshi Enomoto

5 May 2021	Sanfrecce Hiroshima	1–1	Yokohama F. Marinos	Hiroshima
14:03	Ayukawa 90+6'	Report	Ceará 28'	Stadium: Edion Stadium Hiroshima; Attendance: 4,491; Referee: Akihiko Ikeuchi

19 May 2021	Vegalta Sendai	3–0	Sanfrecce Hiroshima	Sendai
19:03	Sasaki 34'; C. Kato 56'; Martinus 75'	Report		Stadium: Yurtec Stadium Sendai; Attendance: 1,560; Referee: Ryo Tanimoto

19 May 2021	Yokohama F. Marinos	5–1	Shimizu S-Pulse	Yokohama
19:03	Kabayama 40', 51'; Wada 48'; Nakagawa 79'; Ceará 89'	Report	Katayama 2'	Stadium: Nissan Stadium; Attendance: 4,363; Referee: Masaaki Toma

== Play-off stage ==
=== Summary ===
The play-off stage was played as two-legged ties of two teams each. The away goals rule, an extra time (away goals rule not applied for the scores in the extra time), and a penalty shoot-out would have been used if needed.

The play-off stage was held over two legs; on 2, 5, and 6 June 2021 (first), and 6 and 13 June 2021 (second). All times listed are in Japan Standard Time (JST, UTC+9).

Team 1	Agg.	Team 2	1st leg	2nd leg
Shimizu S-Pulse	1–3	Kashima Antlers	0–1	1–2
FC Tokyo	4–2	Shonan Bellmare	0–1	4–1
Consadole Sapporo	4–2	Yokohama F. Marinos	1–1	3–1
Vissel Kobe	3–4	Urawa Red Diamonds	1–2	2–2

=== Matches ===
2 June 2021
19:03

Shimizu S-Pulse	0–1	Kashima Antlers
	Report	Hayashi 8'

IAI Stadium Nihondaira, Shizuoka
Attendance: 3,626
Referee: Futoshi Nakamura
6 June 2021
15:03

Kashima Antlers	2–1	Shimizu S-Pulse
Juan Alano 45'; Everaldo 71'	Report	Thiago Santana 21'

Kashima Soccer Stadium, Kashima
Attendance: 7,274
Referee: Yoshiro Imamura

Kashima Antlers won 3–1 on aggregate.

5 June 2021
14:03

FC Tokyo	0–1	Shonan Bellmare
	Report	Wellington 71'

Komazawa Olympic Park Stadium, Setagaya
Attendance: 4,284
Referee: Hayato Shimizu
13 June 2021
17:03

Shonan Bellmare	1–4	FC Tokyo
Nakamura 44'	Report	Leandro 11'; Diego Oliveira 35'; Adaílton 41', 90+2'

Lemon Gas Stadium Hiratsuka, Hiratsuka
Attendance: 4,690
Referee: Nobutsugu Murakami

FC Tokyo won 4–2 on aggregate.

6 June 2021
13:03

Consadole Sapporo	1–1	Yokohama F. Marinos
Aoki 26'	Report	Nakagawa 45+2'

Sapporo Atsubetsu Stadium, Sapporo
Attendance: 3,814
Referee: Koichiro Fukushima
13 June 2021
17:03

Yokohama F. Marinos	1–3	Consadole Sapporo
Mizunuma 61'	Report	Hatanaka 7' (o.g.); Suga 51'; Yanagi 87'

NHK Spring Mitsuzawa Football Stadium, Yokohama
Attendance: 4,909
Referee: Masaaki Toma

Consadole Sapporo won 4–2 on aggregate.

6 June 2021
18:03

Vissel Kobe	1–2	Urawa Red Diamonds
Douglas 3'	Report	A. Ito 45+1'; Koroki 71'

Noevir Stadium Kobe, Kobe
Attendance: 4,720
Referee: Yuichi Nishimura
13 June 2021
18:03

Urawa Red Diamonds	2–2	Vissel Kobe
Koizumi 16'; Junker 45+3'	Report	Douglas 22'; Iniesta 77'

Urawa Komaba Stadium, Saitama
Attendance: 4,892
Referee: Akihiko Ikeuchi

Urawa Red Diamonds won 4–3 on aggregate.

== Prime stage (Knockout stage) ==
The prime stage (knockout stage) was played between four teams which won at the play-off stage and the four 2021 AFC Champions League participants entering the tournament at this stage. The prime stage was played as two-legged ties of two teams each. The away goals rule, an extra time (away goals rule not applied for the scores in the extra time), and a penalty shoot-out were used if needed.

The quarter-finals and the semi-finals were played as two-legged ties (same as the play-off stage). The final was played as a single game.

=== Quarter-finals ===
==== Summary ====
The quarter-finals were held over two legs; on 1 (first) and 5 September 2021 (second). All times listed are in Japan Standard Time (JST, UTC+9).

Team 1	Agg.	Team 2	1st leg	2nd leg
Consadole Sapporo	2–3	FC Tokyo	2–1	0–2
Nagoya Grampus	4–0	Kashima Antlers	2–0	2–0
Cerezo Osaka	4–1	Gamba Osaka	0–1	4–0
Urawa Red Diamonds	4–4 (a)	Kawasaki Frontale	1–1	3–3

==== Matches ====
1 September 2021
19:03

Consadole Sapporo	2–1	FC Tokyo
Tanaka 21'; Arano 80'	Report	Watanabe 14'

Sapporo Atsubetsu Stadium, Sapporo
Attendance: 3,204
Referee: Yoshiro Imamura
5 September 2021
18:03

FC Tokyo	2–0	Consadole Sapporo
Leandro 20'; Higashi 68'	Report

Lemon Gas Stadium Hiratsuka, Hiratsuka
Attendance: 3,272
Referee: Hiroki Kasahara

FC Tokyo won 3–2 on aggregate.

1 September 2021
19:03

Nagoya Grampus	2–0	Kashima Antlers
Kakitani 13'; Inagaki 53'	Report

Toyota Stadium, Toyota
Attendance: 5,744
Referee: Nobutsugu Murakami
5 September 2021
18:03

Kashima Antlers	0–2	Nagoya Grampus
	Report	Inagaki 22'; Świerczok 57'

Kashima Soccer Stadium, Kashima
Referee: Yoshiro Imamura

Nagoya Grampus won 4–0 on aggregate.

1 September 2021
19:03

Cerezo Osaka	0–1	Gamba Osaka
	Report	Yamami 89'

Yodoko Sakura Stadium, Osaka
Attendance: 4,205
Referee: Koichiro Fukushima
5 September 2021
19:03

Gamba Osaka	0–4	Cerezo Osaka
	Report	Yamada 24'; M. Kato 32'; Fujita 56'; Riki Matsuda 68'

Panasonic Stadium Suita, Osaka
Attendance: 4,869
Referee: Hajime Matsuo

Cerezo Osaka won 4–1 on aggregate.

1 September 2021
19:03

Urawa Red Diamonds	1–1	Kawasaki Frontale
Sekine 35'	Report	Ienaga 72' (pen.)

Urawa Komaba Stadium, Saitama
Attendance: 4,629
Referee: Yuichi Nishimura
5 September 2021
18:03

Kawasaki Frontale	3–3	Urawa Red Diamonds
Leandro Damião 40'; Yamamura 77'; João Schmidt 83'	Report	Esaka 8'; Junker 87'; Makino 90+4'

Todoroki Athletics Stadium, Kawasaki
Attendance: 4,936
Referee: Masaaki Toma

4–4 on aggregate. Urawa Red Diamonds won on away goals.

=== Semi-finals ===
==== Summary ====
The semi-finals were held over two legs; on 6 (first) and 10 October 2021 (second). All times listed are in Japan Standard Time (JST, UTC+9).

Team 1	Agg.	Team 2	1st leg	2nd leg
Nagoya Grampus	4–3	FC Tokyo	3–1	1–2
Urawa Red Diamonds	1–2	Cerezo Osaka	1–1	0–1

==== Matches ====
6 October 2021
19:03

Nagoya Grampus	3–1	FC Tokyo
Kakitani 17'; Kimoto 69'; Mateus 90+4'	Report	Adaílton 90+3'

Toyota Stadium, Toyota
Attendance: 7,778
Referee: Hiroyuki Kimura
10 October 2021
14:03

FC Tokyo	2–1	Nagoya Grampus
Adaílton 15'; Takahagi 55'	Report	Inagaki 79'

Ajinomoto Stadium, Chōfu
Attendance: 9,910
Referee: Hajime Matsuo

Nagoya Grampus won 4–3 on aggregate.

6 October 2021
19:03

Urawa Red Diamonds	1–1	Cerezo Osaka
Junker 12'	Report	Yamada 66'

Saitama Stadium 2002, Saitama
Attendance: 8,734
Referee: Ryuji Sato
10 October 2021
15:03

Cerezo Osaka	1–0	Urawa Red Diamonds
M. Kato 53'	Report

Yodoko Sakura Stadium, Osaka
Attendance: 8,654
Referee: Koichiro Fukushima

Cerezo Osaka won 2–1 on aggregate.

=== Final ===
30 October 2021
13:09 JST (UTC+9)

Nagoya Grampus	2–0	Cerezo Osaka
Maeda 47'; Inagaki 79'	Report

Saitama Stadium 2002, Saitama
Attendance: 17,933
Referee: Masaaki Toma

== Top scorers ==
Rank	Player	Club	Goals
1	(Japan) Sho Inagaki	Nagoya Grampus	4
1	(Denmark) Kasper Junker	Urawa Red Diamonds	4
1	(Japan) Teruhito Nakagawa	Yokohama F. Marinos	4
1	(Brazil) Adaílton	FC Tokyo	4
5	(Japan) Hisashi Jogo	Avispa Fukuoka	3
5	(Japan) Ryonosuke Kabayama	Yokohama F. Marinos	3
5	(Japan) Kota Mizunuma	Yokohama F. Marinos	3
5	(Brazil) Douglas Oliveira	Consadole Sapporo	3
5	(Japan) Ado Onaiwu	Yokohama F. Marinos	3
5	(Japan) Takahiro Sekine	Urawa Red Diamonds	3
5	(Brazil) Everaldo Stum	Kashima Antlers	3
