= Yugo Masukake =

Japanese footballer

Personal information
- Date of birth: 24 August 2003 (age 23)
- Place of birth: Saitama, Japan
- Height: 1.75 m (5 ft 9 in)
- Position: Forward

Team information
- Current team: Tochigi City
- Number: 88

Youth career
- Urawa Buzo SSS
- FC Urawa
- –2022: Kashiwa Reysol

Senior career*
Years	Team	Apps	(Gls)
2022–2024	Kashiwa Reysol	11	(0)
2023	→ Ehime FC (loan)	3	(0)
2025–2026	Maringá	3	(0)
2026–	Tochigi City	12	(1)

International career
2022	Japan U19	4	(0)
- * Club domestic league appearances and goals as of 16 August 2026

Yugo Masukake (升掛 友護, Masukake Yugo; born 24 August 2003) is a Japanese professional footballer who plays as a forward for Tochigi City.

== Club career ==
=== Kashiwa Reysol ===
On 2 March 2022, Masukake scored two goals as Kashiwa Reysol lost 3–2 to Hokkaido Consadole Sapporo in the J.League Cup. He followed this up with another goal in Kashiwa Reysol's 1–1 draw against Sagan Tosu in the same competition on 26 March, stating after the match that he wanted to "score more goals for the team", as he had yet to score in the league. He scored again in the following match, also against Sagan Tosu in the J.League Cup, as Kashiwa Reysol won 3–1, putting him top of the scoring chart in the competition at the time.

The following season, after only featuring once for Kashiwa Reysol in the Emperor's Cup, his contract was upgraded to Pro-A status in June 2023. The following month he joined J3 League club Ehime FC on a developmental loan. After only five league appearances for Ehime, he returned to Kashiwa Reysol in January 2024. He would later state that he found it difficult to break into the first team as a result of Ehime's good form, as they earned promotion to the J2 League.

After a quiet 2024 season, in which he played twice for Kashiwa Reysol, it was announced in January 2025 that Masukake had left the club to pursue a contract with a foreign club. When asked why he wanted to leave Japan, he stated that his style of football "would suit overseas", and that he had been planning to stay with Kashiwa Reysol until he had received an offer from another club.

=== Maringá ===
On 14 February 2025, Masukake was announced as a new player of Brazilian Série C club Maringá. He made his debut with the club the following day, coming on as a second-half substitute for Cauã Tavares in a 3–1 Campeonato Paranaense loss to Operário-PR.

== International career ==
Masukake was called up to Japan's under-19 side for the 2022 Maurice Revello Tournament.

== Personal life ==
Masukake's brother, Sogo, is also a footballer, and played at the Minami-Urawa Junior High School before joining Kashiwa Reysol himself. He has a rare surname in Japan, being one of only twenty people nationwide with the name Masukake.

== Style of play ==
Noted for his dribbling, Masukake is most often utilised as a forward just behind the striker, but is also capable of playing as a wide-midfielder or inside-forward.

== Career statistics ==
=== Club ===
As of 3 June 2025

Appearances and goals by club, season and competition
Club	Season	League			National cup (Note: Includes Emperor's Cup and Copa do Brasil)		National cup (Note: Includes J.League Cup)		Other		Total	
Club	Season	Division	Apps	Goals	Apps	Goals	Apps	Goals	Apps	Goals	Apps	Goals
Kashiwa Reysol	2022	J1 League	10	0	1	0	6	4	0	0	17	4
Kashiwa Reysol	2023	J1 League	0	0	1	1	0	0	0	0	1	1
Kashiwa Reysol	2024	J1 League	1	0	1	0	0	0	0	0	2	0
Kashiwa Reysol	Total		11	0	3	1	6	4	0	0	20	5
Ehime FC (loan)	2023	J3 League	5	0	0	0	0	0	0	0	5	0
Maringá	2025	Série C	0	0	0	0	0	0	1 (Note: Appearances in the Campeonato Paranaense)	0	1	0
Career total			16	0	3	1	6	4	1	0	26	5
