= Yosuke Yuzawa =

Japanese footballer

Yosuke Yuzawa 湯澤 洋介
Personal information
- Full name: Yosuke Yuzawa
- Date of birth: 31 December 1990 (age 35)
- Place of birth: Nikkō, Tochigi, Japan
- Height: 1.67 m (5 ft 6 in)
- Position: Winger

Team information
- Current team: J-Lease FC
- Number: 44

Youth career
- 2006–2008: Yaita Chuo High School

College career
| Years | Team | Apps | (Gls) |
| 2009–2012 | Komazawa University | | |

Senior career*
| Years | Team | Apps | (Gls) |
| 2013–2015 | Tochigi SC | 87 | (4) |
| 2016–2017 | Mito HollyHock | 73 | (4) |
| 2018–2019 | Kyoto Sanga | 22 | (0) |
| 2020–2022 | Sagan Tosu | 0 | (0) |
| 2023– | J-Lease FC | 0 | (0) |
- * Club domestic league appearances and goals as of 21:59, 26 March 2023 (UTC)

Yosuke Yuzawa (湯澤 洋介, Yuzawa, Yosuke; born 16 October 1990 in Nikkō, Tochigi) is a Japanese footballer who plays as a midfielder for J-Lease FC.

== Club statistics ==
Updated to 19 July 2022.

| Club performance | | | League | | Cup | | League Cup | | Total | |
| Season | Club | League | Apps | Goals | Apps | Goals | Apps | Goals | Apps | Goals |
| Japan | | | League | | Emperor's Cup | | J.League Cup | | Total | |
|---|---|---|---|---|---|---|---|---|---|---|
| 2013 | Tochigi SC | J2 League | 23 | 1 | 1 | 1 | – | | 24 | 2 |
| 2014 | Tochigi SC | J2 League | 37 | 3 | 1 | 0 | – | | 38 | 3 |
| 2015 | Tochigi SC | J2 League | 27 | 0 | 1 | 0 | – | | 28 | 0 |
| 2016 | Mito HollyHock | J2 League | 38 | 3 | 0 | 0 | – | | 38 | 3 |
| 2017 | Mito HollyHock | J2 League | 35 | 1 | 1 | 0 | – | | 36 | 1 |
| 2018 | Kyoto Sanga | J2 League | 18 | 0 | 1 | 0 | – | | 19 | 0 |
| 2019 | Kyoto Sanga | J2 League | 4 | 0 | 0 | 0 | – | | 4 | 0 |
| 2020 | Sagan Tosu | J1 League | 0 | 0 | – | | 1 | 0 | 1 | 0 |
| 2021 | Sagan Tosu | J1 League | 0 | 0 | 1 | 0 | 5 | 2 | 6 | 2 |
| 2022 | Sagan Tosu | J1 League | 0 | 0 | 1 | 0 | 0 | 0 | 1 | 0 |
| Career total | | | 182 | 8 | 7 | 1 | 6 | 3 | 195 | 11 |
