= 2014 J.League Cup final =

Gamba Osaka	Sanfrecce Hiroshima
3	2
- Date: November 8, 2014
- Venue: Saitama Stadium 2002, Saitama

2014 J.League Cup final was the 22nd final of the J.League Cup competition. The final was played at Saitama Stadium 2002 in Saitama on November 8, 2014. Gamba Osaka won the championship.

== Match details ==
November 8, 2014

Gamba Osaka	3–2	Sanfrecce Hiroshima
Patric 38', 54'; Kotaro Omori 71'	Report	Hisato Sato 20', 35'

Saitama Stadium 2002

Gamba Osaka
GK	1	(Japan) Masaaki Higashiguchi
DF	14	(Japan) Koki Yonekura
DF	5	(Japan) Daiki Niwa
DF	8	(Japan) Keisuke Iwashita
DF	22	(South Korea) Oh Jae-suk
MF	17	(Japan) Tomokazu Myojin	(substituted off) 46'
MF	15	(Japan) Yasuyuki Konno
MF	13	(Japan) Hiroyuki Abe	(substituted off) 90+3'
MF	7	(Japan) Yasuhito Endo
FW	39	(Japan) Takashi Usami	(substituted off) 84'
FW	29	(Brazil) Patric
Substitutes:
GK	16	(Japan) Kohei Kawata
DF	4	(Japan) Hiroki Fujiharu
DF	6	(South Korea) Kim Jung-ya
MF	11	(Japan) Shu Kurata	(substituted in) 90+3'
MF	19	(Japan) Kotaro Omori	(substituted in) 46'
FW	9	(Brazil) Lins	(substituted in) 84'
FW	20	(Japan) Akihiro Sato
Manager:
(Japan) Kenta Hasegawa

Sanfrecce Hiroshima
GK	1	(Japan) Takuto Hayashi
DF	33	(Japan) Tsukasa Shiotani
DF	5	(Japan) Kazuhiko Chiba
DF	4	(Japan) Hiroki Mizumoto
MF	18	(Japan) Yoshifumi Kashiwa
MF	6	(Japan) Toshihiro Aoyama
MF	30	(Japan) Kosei Shibasaki	(substituted off) 83'
MF	16	(Japan) Satoru Yamagishi	(substituted off) 72'
MF	9	(Japan) Naoki Ishihara
MF	10	(Japan) Yojiro Takahagi
FW	11	(Japan) Hisato Sato	(substituted off) 78'
Substitutes:
GK	13	(Japan) Takuya Masuda
DF	2	(South Korea) Hwang Seok-ho
MF	8	(Japan) Kazuyuki Morisaki
MF	27	(Japan) Kohei Shimizu	(substituted in) 72'
MF	7	(Japan) Koji Morisaki	(substituted in) 78'
MF	24	(Japan) Gakuto Notsuda
FW	22	(Japan) Yusuke Minagawa	(substituted in) 83'
Manager:
(Japan) Hajime Moriyasu

== See also ==
- 2014 J.League Cup
