= Ryonosuke Kabayama =

Japanese footballer

Ryonosuke Kabayama 樺山 諒乃介
Personal information
- Date of birth: 17 September 2002 (age 24)
- Place of birth: Osaka, Japan
- Height: 1.71 m (5 ft 7 in)
- Position: Winger

Team information
- Current team: Ehime FC
- Number: 99

Youth career
- SS Create
- Rip Ace SC
- 2018–2020: Kokoku High School

Senior career*
Years	Team	Apps	(Gls)
2021–2023	Yokohama F. Marinos	23	(3)
2021–2022	→ Montedio Yamagata (loan)	32	(4)
2023–2025	Sagan Tosu	35	(4)
2024	Thespa Gunma (Loan)	15	(1)
2025	Giravanz Kitakyushu (Loan)	28	(2)
2026–	Ehime FC	18	(41)

International career
2018	Japan U16		
2019	Japan U17		
2020	Japan U18		
- * Club domestic league appearances and goals as of 17 August 2026

Ryonosuke Kabayama (樺山 諒乃介, Kabayama Ryonosuke; born 17 September 2002) is a Japanese footballer who plays as a winger for Ehime FC.

== Career statistics ==
=== Club ===
As of start of the 2023 season.

Appearances and goals by club, season and competition
Club	Season	League			Cup		League Cup		Other		Total	
Club	Season	Division	Apps	Goals	Apps	Goals	Apps	Goals	Apps	Goals	Apps	Goals
Japan			League		Emperor's Cup		J.League Cup		Other		Total	
Yokohama F. Marinos	2021	J1 League	5	0	1	0	7	3	–		13	3
Yokohama F. Marinos	2022	J1 League	7	0	2	0	0	0	1 (Note: Appearance in the AFC Champions League)	0	10	0
Yokohama F. Marinos	Total		12	0	3	0	7	3	1	0	23	3
Montedio Yamagata (loan)	2021	J2 League	16	2	0	0	–		–		16	2
Montedio Yamagata (loan)	2022	J2 League	15	2	0	0	–		1 (Note: Appearance in the J1/J2 play-offs)	0	16	2
Montedio Yamagata (loan)	Total		31	4	0	0	0	0	1	0	32	4
Sagan Tosu	2023	J1 League	0	0	0	0	0	0	–		0	0
Sagan Tosu	Total		0	0	0	0	0	0	0	0	0	0
Career total			43	4	3	0	7	3	2	0	55	7
