= Makoto Mitsuta =

Japanese footballer

Makoto Mitsuta 満田 誠
Personal information
- Full name: Makoto Mitsuta
- Date of birth: 20 July 1999 (age 27)
- Place of birth: Kumamoto, Kumamoto, Japan
- Height: 1.70 m (5 ft 7 in)
- Position: Winger

Team information
- Current team: Kashiwa Reysol (on loan from Gamba Osaka)
- Number: 51

Youth career
- –2014: Sorriso Kumamoto
- 2015–2017: Sanfrecce Hiroshima

College career
Years	Team	Apps	(Gls)
2018–2021	Ryutsu Keizai University		

Senior career*
Years	Team	Apps	(Gls)
2022–2025	Sanfrecce Hiroshima	87	(16)
2025	→ Gamba Osaka (loan)	35	(2)
2026–	Gamba Osaka	1	(0)
2026	→ Vissel Kobe (loan)	6	(0)
2026–	→ Kashiwa Reysol (loan)	0	(0)

International career^{‡}
2022–	Japan	2	(0)
Medal record
Men's football
Representing Japan
EAFF Championship
Winner	2022 Japan	Team.
- * Club domestic league appearances and goals as of 10 August 2026 ‡ National team caps and goals as of 27 July 2022

Makoto Mitsuta (満田 誠, Mitsuta Makoto; born 20 July 1999), is a Japanese professional footballer, who plays as a winger for Kashiwa Reysol, on loan from Gamba Osaka, and has been selected for squads for the Japan national team.

== Career statistics ==
=== Club ===
As of 9 April 2026.

Appearances and goals by club, season and competition
Club	Season	League			National cup (Note: Includes Emperors Cup)		League cup (Note: Includes J.League Cup)		Continental		Total	
Club	Season	Division	Apps	Goals	Apps	Goals	Apps	Goals	Apps	Goals	Apps	Goals
Ryutsu Keizai University FC	2018	KSL	3	0	0	0	–		–		3	0
Ryutsu Keizai University FC	2019	–			1	0	–		–		1	0
Ryutsu Keizai University FC	2021	–			1	0	–		–		1	0
Ryutsu Keizai University FC	Total		3	0	2	0	0	0	0	0	5	0
Sanfrecce Hiroshima	2022	J1 League	29	9	5	1	12	2	0	0	46	12
Sanfrecce Hiroshima	2023	J1 League	23	4	0	0	4	3	0	0	27	7
Sanfrecce Hiroshima	2024	J1 League	35	3	4	2	6	1	5 (Note: Appearances in AFC Champions League Two)	0	50	6
Sanfrecce Hiroshima	2025	J1 League	0	0	0	0	0	0	1	0	1	0
Sanfrecce Hiroshima	Total		87	16	9	3	22	6	6	0	124	25
Gamba Osaka (loan)	2025	J1 League	35	2	2	0	3	0	5	0	45	2
Gamba Osaka	2026	J1 (100)	1	0	–		–		1	0	2	0
Vissel Kobe (loan)	2026	J1 (100)	1	0	–		–		–		1	0
Career total			127	18	13	3	25	6	12	0	177	27

== Honours ==
=== Club ===
Sanfrecce Hiroshima

- J.League Cup: 2022
- Japanese Super Cup: 2025

Vissel Kobe

- J1 100 Year Vision League: 2026

=== International ===
- EAFF Championship: 2022
