= Yoshifumi Kashiwa =

Japanese footballer

Yoshifumi Kashiwa 柏好文
Personal information
- Full name: Yoshifumi Kashiwa
- Date of birth: July 28, 1987 (age 39)
- Place of birth: Fujikawa, Yamanashi, Japan
- Height: 1.68 m (5 ft 6 in)
- Position: Winger

Youth career
- 1995–1999: Masuho SSS
- 2000–2002: Fortuna SC
- 2003–2005: Nirasaki High School

College career
Years	Team	Apps	(Gls)
2006–2009	Kokushikan University		

Senior career*
Years	Team	Apps	(Gls)
2010–2013	Ventforet Kofu	120	(10)
2014–2024	Sanfrecce Hiroshima	284	(28)
2025	Ventforet Kofu	1	(0)
Total		408	(37)
Medal record
Sanfrecce Hiroshima
Winner	J1 League	2015
Runner-up	J1 League	2018
Runner-up	J.League Cup	2014
- * Club domestic league appearances and goals as of 1 January 2026

Yoshifumi Kashiwa (柏好文, Kashiwa Yoshifumi, born July 28, 1987) is a Japanese former professional football player who played as a winger.

Primarily known for his ten year spell with Sanfrecce Hiroshima, Kashiwa has over 400 league appearances.

== Career ==
Kashiwa was a regular player during his first year at Kokushikan University.

On 6 January 2014, Kashiwa was announced at Sanfreece Hiroshima on a permanent transfer. Kashiwa was part of the squad called up for the 2015 FIFA Club World Cup. After beating TP Mazembe in the quarter finals, he described a close chance he has as being "the one who was the most scared. I thought it was going in (laughs).".

In September 2019, Kashiwa won the 2019 Meiji Yasuda J.League KONAMI Monthly MVP Award for August 2019. On 2 January 2021, Kashiwa extended his contract for the 2022 season.

Kashiwa was part of the Sanfreece team that won the 2022 J.League Cup.

On 5 August 2023, Kashiwa made his 400th J League appearance against Shonan Bellmare. On 30 December 2023, he extended his contract for the 2024 season.

On 25 November 2024, the club announced that he would not be extending his contract for the 2025 season. In his final match for Sanfreece Hiroshima, he came on as a substitute in the 78th minute and assisted Mutsuki Kato.

On 28 December 2024, Kashiwa was announced at Ventforet Kofu on a permanent transfer, returning to the club after 12 years. In January 2025, he was diagnosed with Vogt–Koyanagi–Harada disease and subsequently made only one appearance for the club during the season. He announced his retirement at the end of the 2025 season.

== After football ==
In March 2026, Kashiwa was announced as a club ambassador of Ventforet Kofu.

== Club statistics ==
Appearances and goals by club, season and competition
Club	Season	League			National cup (Note: Includes Emperor's Cup)		League cup (Note: Includes J.League Cup)		Continental		Other		Total	
Club	Season	Division	Apps	Goals	Apps	Goals	Apps	Goals	Apps	Goals	Apps	Goals	Apps	Goals
Kokushikan University	2008	–			2	0	–		–		–		2	0
Ventforet Kofu	2010	J.League Division 2	16	1	2	0	0	0	–		–		18	1
Ventforet Kofu	2011	J.League Division 1	29	1	1	0	1	0	–		–		31	1
Ventforet Kofu	2012	J.League Division 2	41	4	0	0	0	0	–		–		41	4
Ventforet Kofu	2013	J.League Division 1	34	4	4	0	3	0	–		–		41	4
Ventforet Kofu	Total		120	10	7	0	4	0	0	0	0	0	131	10
Sanfrecce Hiroshima	2014	J.League Division 1	29	2	0	0	5	0	6 (Note: Appearances in AFC Champions League)	0	0	0	40	2
Sanfrecce Hiroshima	2015	J1 League	30	4	4	1	2	0	0	0	6 (Note: Two appearances, one goal in J. League Championship) (Note: Four appearances in FIFA Club World Cup)	1	42	6
Sanfrecce Hiroshima	2016	J1 League	34	1	2	0	2	0	5	0	1 (Note: Appearance in Japanese Super Cup)	0	44	1
Sanfrecce Hiroshima	2017	J1 League	29	2	2	0	4	0	0	0	0	0	35	2
Sanfrecce Hiroshima	2018	J1 League	34	4	3	0	2	0	0	0	0	0	39	4
Sanfrecce Hiroshima	2019	J1 League	34	8	1	0	2	0	5	0	0	0	42	8
Sanfrecce Hiroshima	2020	J1 League	28	1	0	0	2	0	0	0	0	0	30	1
Sanfrecce Hiroshima	2021	J1 League	29	2	0	0	6	0	0	0	0	0	35	2
Sanfrecce Hiroshima	2022	J1 League	25	3	4	1	10	2	0	0	0	0	39	6
Sanfrecce Hiroshima	2023	J1 League	9	0	1	0	4	0	0	0	0	0	14	0
Sanfrecce Hiroshima	2024	J1 League	6	0	3	0	1	1	5 (Note: Appearances in AFC Champions League Two)	0	0	0	15	1
Sanfrecce Hiroshima	Total		287	27	20	2	40	3	21	0	7	1	375	33
Ventforet Kofu	2025	J2 League	1	0	0	0	0	0	–		–		1	0
Career total			408	37	29	2	44	3	21	0	7	1	509	43

== Honours ==
=== Club ===
Sanfrecce Hiroshima

- J.League Cup: 2022
