= Jelani Reshaun Sumiyoshi =

American soccer player

Jelani Reshaun Sumiyoshi 住吉 ジェラニ レショーン
Personal information
- Date of birth: October 5, 1997 (age 29)
- Place of birth: New Orleans, Louisiana, U.S
- Height: 1.82 m (6 ft 0 in)
- Position: Center-back

Team information
- Current team: Shimizu S-Pulse
- Number: 66

Youth career
- Ipponmatsu SC
- BANFF Yokohama Bay
- 2013–2015: Nihon Univ. Fujisawa High School

College career
Years	Team	Apps	(Gls)
2016–2019	Kokushikan University		

Senior career*
Years	Team	Apps	(Gls)
2020–2021	Mito HollyHock	48	(2)
2021–2025	Sanfrecce Hiroshima	15	(0)
2024	→ Shimizu S-Pulse (loan)	31	(4)
2025–	Shimizu S-Pulse	51	(1)
- * Club domestic league appearances and goals as of 10 August 2026

Jelani Reshaun Sumiyoshi (住吉 ジェラニ レショーン, Sumiyoshi Jerani Reshōn; ; born October 5, 1997) is an American soccer player who plays as a center-back for J1 League club Shimizu S-Pulse.

== Personal life ==
Jelani Reshaun Sumiyoshi was born October 5, 1997 in New Orleans, Louisiana to an African-American father and a Japanese mother.

== Career statistics ==
=== Club ===
As of April 11, 2024.

Club	Season	League			National Cup		League Cup		Other		Total	
Club	Season	Division	Apps	Goals	Apps	Goals	Apps	Goals	Apps	Goals	Apps	Goals
Japan			League		Emperor's Cup		J. League Cup		Other		Total	
Kokushikan University	2017	–			2	0	–		0	0	2	0
Mito HollyHock	2020	J2 League	27	1	0	0	0	0	0	0	27	1
Mito HollyHock	2021	J2 League	21	1	0	0	0	0	0	0	21	1
Mito HollyHock	Total		48	2	0	0	0	0	0	0	48	2
Sanfrecce Hiroshima	2021	J1 League	1	0	0	0	0	0	0	0	1	0
Sanfrecce Hiroshima	2022	J1 League	8	0	4	0	6	2	0	0	18	2
Sanfrecce Hiroshima	2023	J1 League	6	0	0	0	3	0	0	0	9	0
Sanfrecce Hiroshima	Total		15	0	4	0	9	2	0	0	28	2
Shimizu S-Pulse (loan)	2024	J2 League	8	1	0	0	0	0	0	0	8	1
Career total			71	3	6	0	9	2	0	0	84	5

== Honors ==
=== Club ===
Sanfrecce Hiroshima

- J.League Cup: 2022

=== Individual ===
- J2 League Best XI: 2024
