= Koji Toriumi =

Japanese footballer

Koji Toriumi 鳥海 晃司
Personal information
- Full name: Koji Toriumi
- Date of birth: May 9, 1995 (age 31)
- Place of birth: Kisarazu, Japan
- Height: 1.82 m (5 ft 11 1/2 in)
- Position: Centre back

Team information
- Current team: JEF United Chiba
- Number: 24

Youth career
- 2004–2007: FC Uno Kisarazu
- 2008–2013: JEF United Chiba

College career
Years	Team	Apps	(Gls)
2014–2017	Meiji University		

Senior career*
Years	Team	Apps	(Gls)
2018–2020	JEF United Chiba	79	(1)
2021–2024	Cerezo Osaka	83	(1)
2025–	JEF United Chiba	36	(2)
- * Club domestic league appearances and goals as of 12 August 2026

Koji Toriumi (鳥海 晃司, Toriumi Koji; born May 9, 1995) is a Japanese professional footballer who plays as a centre back for J2 League club JEF United Chiba.

== Career ==
Toriumi was born in Kisarazu and played youth football with JEF United Chiba and Meiji University before starting his professional career with JEF United Chiba senior squad in 2018. After three seasons and 80 appearances in the J2 League, Toriumi moved to Cerezo Osaka at the end of 2020.

== Club statistics ==
As of match played 10 March 2022

Appearances and goals by club, season and competition
Club	Season	League			National cup		League cup		Other		Total	
Club	Season	Division	Apps	Goals	Apps	Goals	Apps	Goals	Apps	Goals	Apps	Goals
Japan			League		Emperor's Cup		J. League Cup		Other		Total	
JEF United Chiba	2018	J2 League	24	0	1	0	–		–		25	0
JEF United Chiba	2019	J2 League	24	0	0	0	–		–		24	0
JEF United Chiba	2020	J2 League	31	1	0	0	–		–		31	1
JEF United Chiba	Total		79	1	1	0	0	0	0	0	80	1
Cerezo Osaka	2021	J1 League	4	1	2	1	2	0	3 (Note: Appearances in the AFC Champions League)	0	11	2
Cerezo Osaka	2022	J1 League	2	0	0	0	1	0	–		3	0
Cerezo Osaka	Total		6	1	2	1	3	0	3	0	14	2
Career total			85	2	3	1	3	0	3	0	94	3
