= Akio Kogiku =

Japanese footballer and manager

Akio Kogiku 小菊 昭雄
Personal information
- Date of birth: 7 July 1975 (age 51)
- Place of birth: Kobe, Hyōgo, Japan
- Position: Midfielder

Team information
- Current team: Sagan Tosu (manager)

Youth career
- 1991–1993: Takigawa Daini High School

College career
Years	Team	Apps	(Gls)
1994–1998	Aichi Gakuin University		

Managerial career
- 2021–2025: Cerezo Osaka
- 2025–: Sagan Tosu

Akio Kogiku (小菊 昭雄, Kogiku Akio; born 7 July 1975) is a Japanese football manager and former football player. He is the currently manager of J2 League club Sagan Tosu.

== Managerial career ==
Having first taken over as Cerezo Osaka manager after the departure of Brazilian Levir Culpi, Kogiku renewed his contract ahead of the 2022 season.

On 14 December 2024, Kogiku announcement officially manager of J2 relegated club, Sagan Tosu from 2025 season.

== Managerial statistics ==
As of the start from 2025 season.

Managerial record by team and tenure
Team	From	To	Record				
Team	From	To	P	W	D	L	Win %
Cerezo Osaka	26 August 2021	31 January 2025	156	64	36	56	41.03
Sagan Tosu	1 February 2025	present	2	0	0	2	0.00
Total			158	64	36	58	40.51
