= Masaki Ikeda =

Japanese footballer

Masaki Ikeda 池田 昌生
Personal information
- Full name: Masaki Ikeda
- Date of birth: July 8, 1999 (age 27)
- Place of birth: Osaka, Japan
- Height: 1.77 m (5 ft 10 in)
- Positions: Attacking midfielder; winger

Team information
- Current team: Shonan Bellmare
- Number: 27

Youth career
- 2007–2009: Nakaizuo JSC
- 2010–2014: Cerezo Osaka
- 2015–2017: Higashiyama High School

Senior career*
Years	Team	Apps	(Gls)
2018–2020	Fukushima United	97	(8)
2021–	Shonan Bellmare	111	(8)
- * Club domestic league appearances and goals as of 14 August 2026

Masaki Ikeda (池田 昌生, Ikeda Masaki; born July 8, 1999) is a Japanese football player for Shonan Bellmare.

== Career ==
After being part of Cerezo Osaka youth ranks and attending Higashiyama High School, Ikeda joined Fukushima United FC in January 2018.

== Career statistics ==
Updated to 15 October 2022.

Appearances and goals by club, season and competition
Club	Season	League			Emperor's Cup		J.League Cup		Total	
Club	Season	Division	Apps	Goals	Apps	Goals	Apps	Goals	Apps	Goals
Fukushima United FC	2018	J3 League	32	3	–		–		32	3
Fukushima United FC	2019	J3 League	33	2	–		–		33	2
Fukushima United FC	2020	J3 League	32	3	–		–		32	3
Shonan Bellmare	2021	J1 League	18	0	3	0	7	1	28	1
Shonan Bellmare	2022	J1 League	22	3	0	0	8	4	30	7
Career total			137	11	3	0	15	5	155	16
