= Hiroto Yamada =

Japanese footballer (born 2000)

Hiroto Yamada 山田 寛人
Personal information
- Full name: Hiroto Yamada
- Date of birth: March 7, 2000 (age 26)
- Place of birth: Aichi, Japan
- Height: 1.83 m (6 ft 0 in)
- Position: Forward

Team information
- Current team: Sagan Tosu
- Number: 34

Youth career
- 2009–2011: Aichi FC
- 2012–2014: Roupeiro Kariya
- 2015–2017: Cerezo Osaka

Senior career*
Years	Team	Apps	(Gls)
2016–2019	Cerezo Osaka U-23	39	(10)
2019–2024	Cerezo Osaka	48	(4)
2019	→ FC Ryukyu (loan)	10	(2)
2020	→ Vegalta Sendai (loan)	19	(2)
2023	→ Vegalta Sendai (loan)	34	(2)
2025–	Sagan Tosu	23	(6)

International career
2015	Japan U-15	1	(0)
2017	Japan U-17	9	(2)
- * Club domestic league appearances and goals as of 1 January 2026

Hiroto Yamada (山田 寛人, Yamada Hiroto; born March 7, 2000) is a Japanese professional football player who plays as a forward for J2 League club Sagan Tosu.

== Career ==
=== Cerezo Osaka ===
Hiroto Yamada joined Cerezo Osaka in 2016. On 29 September 2017, he was officially promoted to the first team from the 2018 season. Yamada made his professional debut for the club in the AFC Champions League against Buriram United on 6 March 2018. On 11 January 2022, he signed a three year contract extension. Yamada scored his first league goal against Consadole Sapporo on 19 March 2022, scoring in the 25th minute.

On 22 October 2016, Yamada made his debut for Cerezo Osaka U-23 in a 1-2 defeat against Blaublitz Akita in the J3 League, coming on in the 85 minute. In doing so, Yamada became the first player born in the 2000s to make an appearance in J3 League and any category of the Japanese football league system. He scored his first league goal for the club against SC Sagamihara on 25 March 2018, scoring in the 90th+1st minute.

=== FC Ryukyu ===
On 27 August 2019, Yamada was loaned to FC Ryukyu.

=== First loan spell at Vegalta Sendai ===
On 7 February 2020, Yamada was loaned to Vegalta Sendai. He made his league debut against Shonan Bellmare on 4 July 2020. Yamada scored his first goal for the club, and his first J1 League goal, against Urawa Red Diamonds on 8 July 2020, scoring in the 49th minute.

=== Second loan spell at Vegalta Sendai ===
On 30 November 2022, Yamada was loaned to Vegalta Sendai for a second time.

=== Sagan Tosu ===
On 7 January 2025, Yamada was announced at Sagan Tosu.

== Club statistics ==
Updated to 1 December 2022.

Club performance			League		Cup		League Cup		Continental		Total	
Season	Club	League	Apps	Goals	Apps	Goals	Apps	Goals	Apps	Goals	Apps	Goals
Japan			League		Cup		League Cup		ACL		Total	
2016	Cerezo Osaka U-23	J3 League	1	0	–		–		–		1	0
2017	Cerezo Osaka U-23	J3 League	8	0	–		–		–		8	0
2018	Cerezo Osaka U-23	J3 League	15	3	–		–		2	0	17	3
2019	Cerezo Osaka U-23	J3 League	15	7	–		–		–		15	7
2019	Cerezo Osaka	J1 League	1	0	0	0	3	1	–		4	1
2019	FC Ryukyu	J2 League	10	2	–		–		–		10	2
2020	Vegalta Sendai	J1 League	19	2	–		2	0	–		21	2
2021	Cerezo Osaka	J1 League	14	0	2	0	5	2	3	0	24	2
2022	Cerezo Osaka	J1 League	20	4	4	0	4	2	–		28	6
2023	Vegalta Sendai	J2 League					–		–			
Career total			103	18	6	0	14	5	5	0	128	23
