= Hikaru Nakahara =

Japanese footballer

Personal information
- Date of birth: 8 July 1996 (age 30)
- Place of birth: Yamaga, Kumamoto, Japan
- Height: 1.69 m (5 ft 7 in)
- Position: Winger

Team information
- Current team: Sagan Tosu
- Number: 20

Youth career
- 2000–2008: Yamaga FCJ
- 2009–2011: Luther Gakuin Junior High School
- 2012–2014: Luther Gakuin High School

College career
Years	Team	Apps	(Gls)
2015–2018	Komazawa University		

Senior career*
Years	Team	Apps	(Gls)
2019–2020	Roasso Kumamoto	62	(6)
2021	Montedio Yamagata	41	(6)
2022–2023	Cerezo Osaka	43	(2)
2023	→ Tokyo Verdy (loan)	8	(2)
2024–	Sagan Tosu	23	(2)
2025–2026	→ Shimizu S-Pulse (loan)	30	(2)
- * Club domestic league appearances and goals as of 14 August 2026

Hikaru Nakahara (中原 輝, Nakahara Hikaru; born 8 July 1996) is a Japanese footballer who plays as a winger for club Sagan Tosu.

== Early life ==
Nakahara was born in Yamaga, Kumamoto, Japan.

== Career ==
Nakahara made his debut for Kumamoto on 10 March 2019, playing the full 90 minutes against AC Nagano Parceiro.

On 5 January 2025, Nakahara was announce official transfer to J1 promoted club, Shimizu S-Pulse for 2025 season on loan.

== Career statistics ==
=== Club ===
As of the start for 2025 season.

Club	Season	League			National Cup		League Cup		Other		Total	
Club	Season	Division	Apps	Goals	Apps	Goals	Apps	Goals	Apps	Goals	Apps	Goals
Komazawa University	2018	–			1 (Note: Appearances in the Emperor's Cup)	0	–				1	0
Roasso Kumamoto	2019	J3 League	28	0	1	0	–		0	0	29	0
Roasso Kumamoto	2020	J3 League	34	6	0	0	–		0	0	34	6
Montedio Yamagata	2021	J2 League	41	6	1	0	–		0	0	42	6
Cerezo Osaka	2022	J1 League	27	1	4	0	8	2	–		39	3
Cerezo Osaka	2023	J1 League	16	1	2	0	4	0	–		22	1
Tokyo Verdy	2023	J2 League	16	5	–				2 (Note: Appearances in the J1 Promotion Play-off)	1	18	6
Sagan Tosu	2024	J1 League	22	2	0	0	0	0	–		22	2
Shimizu S-Pulse	2025	J1 League	0	0	0	0	0	0	–		0	0
Career total			184	21	9	0	12	2	2	1	207	24
