= Hirotaka Tameda =

Japanese footballer

Personal information
- Full name: Hirotaka Tameda
- Date of birth: 24 August 1993 (age 33)
- Place of birth: Nagasaki, Japan
- Height: 1.75 m (5 ft 9 in)
- Positions: Winger; midfielder

Team information
- Current team: Júbilo Iwata
- Number: 8

Youth career
- 2009–2011: Oita Trinita

Senior career*
Years	Team	Apps	(Gls)
2010–2015	Oita Trinita	133	(13)
2016–2017	Avispa Fukuoka	22	(1)
2017	→ JEF United Chiba (loan)	17	(4)
2018–2020	JEF United Chiba	98	(4)
2021–2024	Cerezo Osaka	79	(4)
2025–	Júbilo Iwata	37	(2)
- * Club domestic league appearances and goals as of 14 August 2026

Hirotaka Tameda (為田 大貴, Tameda Hirotaka; born 24 August 1993 in Nagasaki) is a Japanese professional footballer who plays as a winger or a midfielder for J2 League club Júbilo Iwata.

== Career ==
=== Oita Trinita ===
Tameda was born in Nagasaki and played youth football with Oita Trinita U-18s before starting his professional career with the senior team in 2010. He remains their youngest player to participate in a league game, debuting at 17 years and 33 days old. Tameda made his league debut against Mito HollyHock on 26 September 2010. On 22 February 2012, he was sidelined for eight weeks due to an injury to his medial collateral ligament in his left knee. Tameda scored his first league goal against Kyoto Sanga on 14 September 2012, scoring in the 33rd minute.

=== Avispa Fukuoka ===
On 29 December 2015, Tameda was announced at Avispa Fukuoka. He made his league debut against Yokohama F. Marinos on 5 March 2016. Tameda scored his first league goal against Júbilo Iwata on 24 August 2016, scoring in the 59th minute.

=== JEF United Chiba ===
Tameda was loaned to JEF United Chiba in 2017 and made a permanent move to the club in 2018.

=== Cerezo Osaka ===
In 2021, Tameda moved to J1 League club Cerezo Osaka. On 30 January 2021, Tameda underwent surgery for a anterior impingement syndrome in his right ankle. On 30 December 2022, Tamada signed a new multi-year contract, starting from the 2023 season.

=== Júbilo Iwata ===
On 28 December 2024, Tameda was announced at Júbilo Iwata.

== International career ==
On 10 May 2016, Tameda was called up to the Japan U23s for a match against Ghana U23s, replacing Junya Itō due to injury.

== Career statistics ==
=== Club ===
As of match played 9 March 2022

Appearances and goals by club, season and competition
Club	Season	League			National cup		League cup		Other		Total	
Club	Season	Division	Apps	Goals	Apps	Goals	Apps	Goals	Apps	Goals	Apps	Goals
Japan			League		Emperor's Cup		J. League Cup		Other		Total	
Oita Trinita	2010	J2 League	5	0	2	0	–		–		7	0
Oita Trinita	2011	J2 League	11	0	0	0	–		–		11	0
Oita Trinita	2012	J2 League	31	2	1	0	–		–		32	2
Oita Trinita	2013	J1 League	21	0	3	0	2	0	–		26	0
Oita Trinita	2014	J2 League	33	5	0	0	–		–		33	5
Oita Trinita	2015	J2 League	32	6	3	1	–		2 (Note: Appearances in J.League Promotion/relegation Series)	0	37	7
Oita Trinita	Total		133	13	9	1	2	0	2	0	146	14
Avispa Fukuoka	2016	J2 League	21	1	1	0	7	0	–		29	1
Avispa Fukuoka	2017	J2 League	1	0	1	0	–		–		2	0
Avispa Fukuoka	Total		22	1	2	0	7	0	0	0	31	1
JEF United Chiba (loan)	2017	J2 League	17	4	0	0	–		1 (Note: Appearance in J1 League promotion play-off)	0	18	4
JEF United Chiba	2018	J2 League	31	2	2	0	–		–		33	2
JEF United Chiba	2019	J2 League	37	2	1	0	–		–		38	2
JEF United Chiba	2020	J2 League	30	0	0	0	–		–		30	0
JEF United Chiba	Total		115	8	3	0	0	0	1	0	119	8
Cerezo Osaka	2021	J1 League	1	0	2	0	1	0	5 (Note: Appearances in the AFC Champions League)	0	9	0
Cerezo Osaka	2022	J1 League	2	0	0	0	2	1	–		4	1
Cerezo Osaka	Total		3	0	2	0	3	1	5	0	13	1
Career total			273	22	16	1	12	1	8	0	309	24
