= Hiroaki Okuno (footballer) =

Japanese footballer

Hiroaki Okuno 奥埜 博亮
Personal information
- Full name: Hiroaki Okuno
- Date of birth: August 14, 1989 (age 37)
- Place of birth: Osaka, Japan
- Height: 1.71 m (5 ft 7 1/2 in)
- Position: Attacking midfielder

Team information
- Current team: Shonan Bellmare
- Number: 25

Youth career
- 2002–2007: Vegalta Sendai

College career
Years	Team	Apps	(Gls)
2008–2011	Sendai University		

Senior career*
Years	Team	Apps	(Gls)
2010	Vegalta Sendai	0	(0)
2012–2018	Vegalta Sendai	126	(17)
2013–2014	→ V-Varen Nagasaki (loan)	55	(7)
2019–2025	Cerezo Osaka	190	(23)
2025–	Shonan Bellmare	30	(0)
Medal record
Vegalta Sendai
Runner-up	J1 League	2012
Runner-up	Emperor's Cup	2018
- * Club domestic league appearances and goals as of 14 August 2026

Hiroaki Okuno (奥埜 博亮, Okuno Hiroaki; born August 14, 1989) is a Japanese footballer who plays for Shonan Bellmare as an attacking midfielder.

== Career ==
Okuno started his career at Vegalta Sendai, signing professional forms in 2012 after graduating through the youth set-up. He made his J. League debut against Kawasaki Frontale at Todoroki Stadium.

== Club statistics ==
Updated to 18 July 2022.

Club performance			League		Cup		League Cup		Continental		Other		Total	
Season	Club	League	Apps	Goals	Apps	Goals	Apps	Goals	Apps	Goals	Apps	Goals	Apps	Goals
Japan			League		Emperor's Cup		J. League Cup		AFC		Other^{1}		Total	
2010	Vegalta Sendai	J1 League	0	0	0	0	1	0	–		–		1	0
2012	Vegalta Sendai	J1 League	2	0	1	1	4	0	–		–		7	1
2013	V-Varen Nagasaki	J2 League	16	3	1	0	–		–		1	0	18	3
2014	V-Varen Nagasaki	J2 League	39	4	2	1	–		–		–		41	5
2015	Vegalta Sendai	J1 League	32	7	4	1	4	0	–		–		40	8
2016	Vegalta Sendai	J1 League	34	4	1	0	6	0	–		–		41	4
2017	Vegalta Sendai	J1 League	31	4	1	0	8	2	–		–		40	6
2018	Vegalta Sendai	J1 League	27	2	4	0	6	1	–		–		37	3
2019	Cerezo Osaka	J1 League	32	7	2	0	4	0	–		–		38	7
2020	Cerezo Osaka	J1 League	34	7	–		4	0	–		–		38	7
2021	Cerezo Osaka	J1 League	32	3	5	1	3	0	6	1	–		46	5
2022	Cerezo Osaka	J1 League	22	3	1	0	4	1	–		–		27	4
Total			301	44	22	4	44	4	6	1	1	0	374	53

^{1}Includes Promotion Playoffs to J1.
