= Sagan Tosu =

Japanese football club

Sagan Tosu サガン鳥栖
- Full name: Sagan Tosu Football Club
- Nickname: Sagan
- Founded: 1997; 29 years ago
- Stadium: Ekimae Real Estate Stadium; Tosu, Saga
- Capacity: 24,130
- Chairman: Minoru Takehara
- Manager: Akio Kogiku
- League: J2 League
- 2025: J2 League, 8th of 20
- Website: sagan-tosu.net
Home colours	Away colours

Sagan Tosu (サガン鳥栖, Sagan Tosu) is a Japanese professional football club based in Tosu, Saga Prefecture. The club plays in the J2 League, the second tier of Japanese football, since 2025 following relegation from the J1 League in 2024.

Sagan is a coined word with various suggested ideas behind where the name came from. One of its homophones is sandstone (砂岩, sagan) in Japanese. This symbolises many small elements uniting to form one formidable object, for example as a metaphor for a team. Also, Sagan Tosu can be interpreted as "Tosu of Saga (Prefecture)" (佐賀ん鳥栖, Saga-n Tosu) in the area's dialect.

== History ==
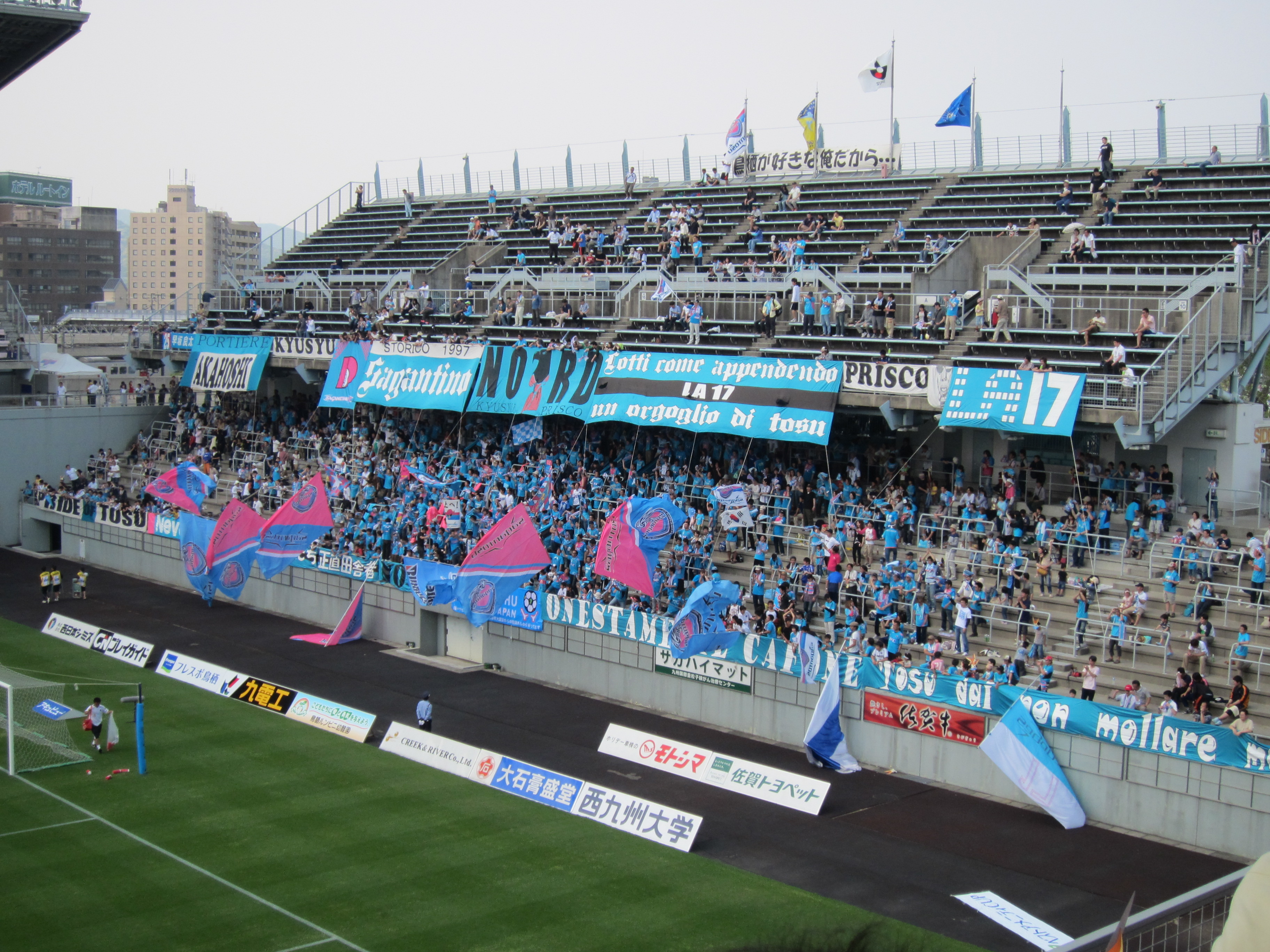
Supporters inside Tosu Stadium in May 2011

In February 1997, Sagan was established as a new club which virtually took over Tosu Futures, which became insolvent in the previous month. They were admitted to participate in the Japan Football League from 1997 to 1998, as well as the J. League Cup in 1997 as a preferential measure, although J. League Associate Membership status was not awarded to Sagan. In 1999, they were admitted to the new J. League Division 2 (J2) as one of the "Original Ten," which were the ten first members of the J2. They remained at that league until their promotion to J1 at the end of the 2011 season. Little by little, Sagan Tosu started to establish itself as one of the top clubs in the country with the new President & Chief Operating Officer Minoru Takehara, who is also part owner of the club.

In their first season at the J1 League in 2012, confounding the prediction of many critics about their immediate relegation to J2, they maintained their position between 5th and 11th place all the way through the season, except on matchweek 2, in which they were ranked 13th. They were ranked third after the 33rd week, having a chance to qualify for the 2013 AFC Champions League if they hadn't lost to Yokohama F. Marinos in the last match of the season. However, they only lost to Yokohama by 0–1, wrapping up the season in 5th place, while Urawa Red Diamonds defeated Nagoya Grampus and were ranked 3rd. They also became the first club in Asia to sign a partnership with Warrior Sports, who sponsor many overseas clubs, including English side Liverpool.

In 2013, they made it to the semi-finals of the Emperor's Cup for the first time in the club's history, becoming the first club based in Kyushu to make it to the semi-finals of the Emperor's Cup since Nippon Steel Yawata had done so in the 1981 edition. In 2013, they invited the A-League team Sydney FC along with the former Italian international player Alessandro Del Piero for a Japan Tour for the first time.

In 2014, the club had their most successful season in the J1 League, being ranked on the top of the 2014 J1 League on the 1st, 2nd, 13th, and 18th matchweek. However, the club suddenly made an announcement on the 8th of August which announced the termination of the contract with the head coach Yoon Jung-Hwan, despite the apparently good season. During the course of the year, they continued on their international expansion and started a partnership with the Italian side Juventus for its Juventus Under-16 Japan Tour 2014. On 10 July 2018, the club reached an agreement with former FIFA World Cup, UEFA Champions League and UEFA Europa League winner, Fernando Torres. The aging star would play 35 games for the side, netting 5 goals before finally hanging up his boots on his star-studded career.

On 19 October 2024, Sagan Tosu officially relegated to J2 League after defeat from Kyoto Sanga 2-0 and return to second tier after 13 years absence with four games left, ended in top tier at 13 years stint.

== Kit and colours ==
=== Kit evolution ===
Home kits
1999–2000	2001–2002	2003–2004	2005	2006–2007
2008–2010	2011–2012	2013	2014	2015
2016	2017	2018	2019	2020
2021	2022	2023	2024	2025

Away kits
1999–2000	2001–2002	2003–2004	2005	2006–2007
2008–2010	2011–2012	2013	2014	2015
2016	2017	2018	2019	2020
2021	2022	2023	2024	2025

Alternative kits
2013 Summer Carnival	2014 Falcon Festival Commemoration	2015 Commemoration	2015; Hawk Festival Memorial	2016; Ladies Day
2016; Hawk Festival Memorial	2017 Ladies' Day	2017; Hawk Festival Memorial	2017; 20th Anniversary	2018 Ladies' Day
2018; Hawk Festival Memorial	2018 DAZN Day	2019 Ladies' Day	2019; Falcon Festival Commemoration	2019; F. Torres retirement game commemoration
2019; F. Torres Retirement Match	2022; 25th Anniversary			

== Current squad ==
As of 14 September 2026.

Note: Flags indicate national team as defined under FIFA eligibility rules; some limited exceptions apply. Players may hold more than one non-FIFA nationality.

No.	Pos.	Nation	Player
1	GK	JPN	Ryota Izumori
2	MF	JPN	Nagi Matsumoto (on loan from Cerezo Osaka)
3	DF	JPN	Kyosuke Kamiyama
4	DF	JPN	Yuta Imazu
5	DF	JPN	Shiva Tafari Nagasawa
6	MF	JPN	Tatsunori Sakurai (on loan from Vissel Kobe)
7	MF	JPN	Koki Sakamoto
8	MF	JPN	Yoshiki Narahara
9	FW	JPN	Toshiki Takahashi
10	FW	JPN	Daichi Suzuki
11	FW	JPN	Ryo Shiohama
12	GK	JPN	Sota Matsubara
13	MF	JPN	Kanta Jojo
14	MF	JPN	Keisuke Sakaiya
15	FW	JPN	Noriyoshi Sakai
16	MF	JPN	Kenta Nishizawa
18	MF	JPN	Rio Hyon

No.	Pos.	Nation	Player
19	FW	KOR	Park Ho-min
20	MF	JPN	Hikaru Nakahara
21	MF	JPN	Ayumu Toyoda
24	MF	JPN	Kakeru Yamauchi (on loan from Vissel Kobe)
26	DF	JPN	Toshiki Ando
28	DF	JPN	Manato Yoshida
31	GK	JPN	Eisuke Fujishima
33	DF	JPN	Sora Ogawa
37	DF	JPN	Reiya Morishita
38	MF	JPN	Tokito Mizumaki
41	MF	JPN	Hibiki Matsuoka ^{DSP}
42	FW	JPN	Haruya Goto ^{DSP}
43	MF	JPN	Kaito Yoshino ^{DSP}
44	DF	JPN	Kaito Abe
46	GK	JPN	Ibuki Vincent Junior Ejike
47	MF	JPN	Riku Izawa ^{Type 2}
76	DF	JPN	Shun Isotani

=== Out on loan ===
Note: Flags indicate national team as defined under FIFA eligibility rules; some limited exceptions apply. Players may hold more than one non-FIFA nationality.

No.	Pos.	Nation	Player
—	DF	JPN	Fumiya Kitajima (at FC Gifu)
—	DF	JPN	Yuya Kuroki (at FC Nobeoka Agata)
—	MF	JPN	Tokia Ikeda (at Okinawa SV)

No.	Pos.	Nation	Player
—	MF	JPN	Ryohei Watanabe (at Reilac Shiga)
—	MF	JPN	Kento Nishiya (at (South Korea) Pohang Steelers)
—	MF	JPN	Yūdai Tanaka (at Tegevajaro Miyazaki)

=== Retired number ===
- 17 (Japan) Sakata Michitaka – A former professor of Saga University and the person which backed up in both the establishment of Tosu Futures and the team's revival as Sagan Tosu. He died due to kidney cancer on 7 January 2000. The number 17 indicates his day of death.

== Club officials ==
As of 27 October 2026.

Role	Name
Manager	(Japan) Akio Kogiku
Head coach	(Japan) Kosuke Kitani
Coaches	(Japan) Yuto Kuwahara (Japan) Yuzuru Suwabe (Japan) Yamato Saino (Japan) Naoyuki Fujita
Assistant coaches	(Japan) Ren Yumitani (Japan) Jefferson Youei Tonaki
Goalkeeping coach	(Japan) Takuya Muro
Physical coach	(Japan) Sho Watanabe
Chief trainer	(Japan) Toru Kawaguchi
Trainers	(Japan) Hisaaki Maehara (Japan) Masahiro Hirano (Japan) Shin Fukushi

== Managerial history ==
Manager	Nationality	Tenure	
Manager	Nationality	Start	Finish
Takashi Kuwahara	Japan	1 February 1993	31 January 1995
Hiroshi Sowa	Japan	1 February 1997	31 January 2000
Kazuhiro Kōso	Japan	1 February 2000	31 January 2002
Hiroshi Soejima	Japan	1 February 2002	31 January 2003
Yoshinori Sembiki	Japan	1 February 2003	31 January 2004
Ikuo Matsumoto	Japan	1 February 2004	31 January 2007
Yasuyuki Kishino	Japan	1 February 2007	31 January 2010
Ikuo Matsumoto	Japan	1 February 2010	31 January 2011
Yun Jeong-hwan	South Korea	1 February 2011	7 August 2014
Megumu Yoshida	Japan	8 August 2014	31 January 2015
Hitoshi Morishita	Japan	1 February 2015	31 January 2016
Massimo Ficcadenti	Italy	1 February 2016	18 October 2018
Kim Myung-hwi	South Korea	19 October 2018	31 January 2019
Luis Carreras	Spain	1 February 2019	4 May 2019
Kim Myung-hwi	South Korea	4 May 2019	20 December 2021
Kenta Kawai	Japan	1 February 2022	8 August 2024
Kosuke Kitani	Japan	9 August 2024	14 December 2024
Akio Kogiku	Japan	14 December 2024	Present

== League & cup record ==
Champions	Runners-up	Third place	Promoted	Relegated

League													J. League Cup	Emperor's Cup
Season	Division	Teams	Position	P	W (OTW/PKW)	D	L (OTL/PKL)	F	A	GD	Pts	Attendance/G	J. League Cup	Emperor's Cup
1997	JFL	16	11th	30	12 (1/0)	–	17	38	54	–16	38	—	Not eligible	3rd round
1998	JFL	16	8th	30	11 (3)	–	16	40	55	–15	39	—	Not eligible	3rd round
1999	J2	10	8th	36	11 (1)	2	20 (2)	52	64	–12	37	3,385	1st round	3rd round
2000	J2	11	6th	40	13 (2)	5	15 (5)	41	52	–11	48	3,714	1st round	3rd round
2001	J2	12	10th	44	8 (2)	4	28 (2)	45	82	–37	32	3,479	1st round	Round of 16
2002	J2	12	9th	44	9	14	21	41	64	–23	41	3,890	Not eligible	3rd round
2003	J2	12	12th	44	3	11	30	40	89	–49	20	3,172	Not eligible	1st round
2004	J2	12	11th	44	8	11	25	32	66	–34	35	3,610	Not eligible	4th round
2005	J2	12	8th	44	14	10	20	58	58	0	52	7,855	Not eligible	4th round
2006	J2	13	4th	48	22	13	13	64	49	15	79	7,465	Not eligible	
2007	J2	13	8th	48	21	9	18	63	66	–3	72	6,114	Not eligible	Round of 16
2008	J2	15	6th	42	19	7	16	50	51	–1	64	7,261	Not eligible	Quarter-finals
2009	J2	18	5th	51	25	13	13	71	51	20	88	5,939	Not eligible	Round of 16
2010	J2	19	9th	36	13	12	11	42	41	1	51	6,633	Not eligible	3rd round
2011	J2	20	2nd	38	19	12	7	68	34	34	69	7,731	Not eligible	2nd round
2012	J1	18	5th	34	15	8	11	48	39	9	53	11,991	Group stage	2nd round
2013	J1	18	12th	34	13	7	14	54	63	–9	46	11,515	Group stage	Semi-finals
2014	J1	18	5th	34	19	3	12	41	33	8	60	14,137	Group stage	Round of 16
2015	J1	18	11th	34	9	13	12	37	54	–17	40	13,450	Group stage	Quarter-finals
2016	J1	18	11th	34	12	10	12	36	37	–1	46	12,636	Group stage	Round of 16
2017	J1	18	8th	34	13	8	13	41	44	–3	47	14,194	Group stage	3rd round
2018	J1	18	14th	34	10	11	13	29	34	–5	41	15,000	Group stage	Quarter-finals
2019	J1	18	15th	34	10	6	18	32	53	–21	36	15,050	Group stage	Quarter-finals
2020 †	J1	18	13th	34	7	15	12	37	43	–6	36	4,675	Group stage	Did not qualify
2021 †	J1	18	7th	38	16	11	11	53	35	8	59	7,276	Group stage	Round of 16
2022	J1	18	11th	34	9	15	10	45	44	1	42	9,358	Group stage	Round of 16
2023	J1	18	14th	34	9	11	14	43	47	–4	38	10,230	Group stage	3rd round
2024	J1	20	20th	38	10	5	23	48	68	–20	35	9,800	Group stage	Round of 16
2025	J2	20	8th	38	16	10	12	46	43	3	58	9,382	1st round	3rd round
2026	J2	40	11th	18	8	6	4	24	14	10	32	7,758	N/A	N/A
2026-27	J2	20	TBD	38									TBD	TBD

Key

- Pos. = Position in league; P = Games played; W = Games won; D = Games drawn; L = Games lost; F = Goals scored; A = Goals conceded; GD = Goals difference; Pts = Points gained
- Attendance/G = Average home league attendance
- OTW / PKW = Overtime wins / Penalty kicks win 1997 & 1998 seasons – 1999, 2000, 2001 & 2002 Overtime wins only
- OTL / PKL = Overtime losses / Penalty kicks losses 1997 and 1998 seasons – 1999, 2000 & 2001 Overtime losses only
- † 2020 & 2021 seasons attendances were reduced by COVID-19 worldwide pandemic
- Source: J.League Data Site
