= Mutsuki Kato =

Japanese footballer

Mutsuki Kato 加藤 陸次樹
Personal information
- Date of birth: 6 August 1997 (age 29)
- Place of birth: Saitama, Japan
- Height: 1.78 m (5 ft 10 in)
- Position: Forward

Team information
- Current team: Sanfrecce Hiroshima
- Number: 11

Youth career
- 2006–2009: Konan Minami SSS
- 2010–2012: Kumagaya SC
- 2013–2015: Sanfrecce Hiroshima

College career
Years	Team	Apps	(Gls)
2016–2019	Chuo University		

Senior career*
Years	Team	Apps	(Gls)
2020	Zweigen Kanazawa	42	(13)
2021-2023	Cerezo Osaka	59	(13)
2023–	Sanfrecce Hiroshima	104	(20)
- * Club domestic league appearances and goals as of 9 August 2026

Mutsuki Kato (加藤 陸次樹, Kato Mutsuki; born 6 August 1997 in Kumagaya, Saitama) is a Japanese footballer who plays as a forward for J1 League club Sanfrecce Hiroshima.

== Career ==
On 20 September 2019, Kato was announced at Zweigen Kanazawa, after joining from Chuo University. From 2nd August 2020 to 16th of August 2020, he scored in four consecutive league matches.

On 27 December 2020, Kato was announced at Cerezo Osaka on a permanent transfer. He scored his first J1 League goal against Yokohama FC on 13 March 2021, scoring in the 87th minute. On 10 October 2021, he scored in the semi-finals of the J.League Cup, against Urawa Reds in the 53rd minute, to take Cerezo Osaka to the final.

On 21 July 2023, Kato was announced at Sanfreece Hiroshima on a permanent transfer.

== Career statistics ==
=== Club ===
As of 5 October 2022

Club	Season	League			National Cup		League Cup		Other		Total	
Club	Season	Division	Apps	Goals	Apps	Goals	Apps	Goals	Apps	Goals	Apps	Goals
Zweigen Kanazawa	2020	J2 League	42	13	–		–		–		42	13
Cerezo Osaka	2021	J1 League	35	7	4	2	5	2	6 (Note: Appearances in AFC Champions League)	2	50	13
Cerezo Osaka	2022	J1 League	24	6	4	1	10	4	–		38	11
Career total			101	26	8	3	15	6	6	2	130	37

== Honours ==
Sanfrecce Hiroshima

- J.League Cup: 2025
- Japanese Super Cup: 2025
