= List of J1 League football transfers winter 2022–23 =

Transfer list

This is a list of J1 League transfers made during the winter transfer window of the 2023 season by each club. The transfer window went from 6 January to 31 March.

== Albirex Niigata ==
Transfers in
Join on	Pos.	Player	Moving from	Transfer type
Pre-season	DF	(Japan) Naoto Arai	(Japan) Cerezo Osaka	Full transfer
Pre-season	MF	(Brazil) Danilo Gomes	(Brazil) Ponte Preta	Free transfer
Pre-season	FW	(Brazil) Gustavo Nescau	(Brazil) Cuiabá	Full transfer
Pre-season	FW	(Japan) Shusuke Ota	(Japan) Machida Zelvia	Full transfer

Transfers out
Leave on	Pos.	Player	Moving to	Transfer type
Pre-season	MF	(Russia) Ippey Shinozuka	(Japan) Kashiwa Reysol	Loan expiration
Pre-season	FW	(Portugal) Alexandre Guedes	(Portugal) Paços de Ferreira	Free transfer
Pre-season	FW	(Japan) Ken Yamura	(Japan) Fujieda MYFC	Loan transfer

== Avispa Fukuoka ==
Transfers in
Join on	Pos.	Player	Moving from	Transfer type
31 Mar	MF	(Japan) Masato Shigemi	(Japan) Fukuoka University	Loan transfer; 2023 DSP
1 Mar	FW	(Brazil) Wellington	(Japan) Shonan Bellmare	Free transfer
Pre-season	GK	(Japan) Daiki Sakata	(Japan) Iwaki FC	Full transfer
Pre-season	GK	(Japan) Kazuaki Suganuma	(Japan) Fukuoka University	Loan transfer; 2023 DSP
Pre-season	DF	(Japan) Itsuki Oda	(Japan) Kashima Antlers	Full transfer
Pre-season	DF	(Japan) Masashi Kamekawa	(Japan) Yokohama FC	Full transfer
Pre-season	MF	(Japan) Kazuya Konno	(Japan) FC Tokyo	Full transfer
Pre-season	MF	(Japan) Yosuke Ideguchi	(Scotland) Celtic FC	Loan transfer
Pre-season	FW	(Japan) Ryoga Sato	(Japan) Tokyo Verdy	Full transfer
Pre-season	FW	(Japan) Reiju Tsuruno	(Japan) Fukuoka University	Full transfer

Transfers out
Leave on	Pos.	Player	Moving to	Transfer type
Pre-season	GK	(Japan) Rikihiro Sugiyama	–	Retirement
Pre-season	DF	(Japan) Takaaki Shichi	(Japan) Sanfrecce Hiroshima	Full transfer
Pre-season	DF	(Japan) Yuta Kumamoto	(Japan) Montedio Yamagata	Full transfer
Pre-season	DF	(Japan) Toshiki Toya	(Japan) Kochi United	Free transfer
Pre-season	DF	(Japan) Kaito Kuwahara	(Japan) Suzuka Point Getters	Free transfer
Pre-season	DF	(Japan) Naoki Wako	–	Retirement
Pre-season	MF	(Belgium) Jordy Croux	(Japan) Cerezo Osaka	Full transfer
Pre-season	MF	(Japan) Yuji Kitajima	(Japan) Tokyo Verdy	Loan transfer
Pre-season	FW	(Cameroon) John Mary	(Turkey) Çaykur Rizespor	Full transfer
Pre-season	FW	(Japan) Daiki Watari	(Japan) Tokushima Vortis	Full transfer
Pre-season	FW	(Spain) Juanma	(Japan) V-Varen Nagasaki	Full transfer

== Cerezo Osaka ==
Transfers in
Join on	Pos.	Player	Moving from	Transfer type
Pre-season	GK	(South Korea) Yang Han-been	(South Korea) FC Seoul	Free transfer
Pre-season	MF	(Japan) Shinji Kagawa	(Belgium) Sint-Truiden	Full transfer
Pre-season	MF	(Belgium) Jordy Croux	(Japan) Avispa Fukuoka	Full transfer
Pre-season	MF	(Japan) Rui Osako	(Japan) Kamimura Gakuen HS	Free transfer
Pre-season	MF	(Japan) Reiya Sakata	(Japan) Higashiyama HS	Free transfer
Pre-season	MF	(Japan) Kosei Okazawa	(Brazil) Red Bull Bragantino U18	Loan return
Pre-season	FW	(Brazil) Léo Ceará	(Japan) Yokohama F. Marinos	Full transfer
Pre-season	FW	(Brazil) Capixaba	(Brazil) EC Juventude	Free transfer
Pre-season	FW	(Japan) Shinnosuke Kinoshita	Cerezo Osaka U18	Promotion
Pre-season	FW	(Japan) Nelson Ishiwatari	Cerezo Osaka U18	Promotion

Transfers out
Leave on	Pos.	Player	Moving to	Transfer type
8 Mar	FW	(Japan) Shota Fujio	(Japan) Machida Zelvia	Loan transfer
Pre-season	GK	(Japan) Shu Mogi	(Japan) FC Gifu	Free transfer
Pre-season	DF	(Japan) Naoto Arai	(Japan) Albirex Niigata	Full transfer
Pre-season	DF	(Japan) Yusuke Maruhashi	(Thailand) BG Pathum United	Loan transfer
Pre-season	DF	(Brazil) Tiago Pagnussat	(Brazil) Ceará	Free transfer
Pre-season	DF	(Japan) Takaya Yoshinare	(Japan) FC Osaka	Free transfer
Pre-season	MF	(Thailand) Chaowat Veerachart	(Thailand) BG Pathum United	Loan expiration
Pre-season	FW	(Australia) Adam Taggart	(Australia) Perth Glory	Full transfer
Pre-season	FW	(Brazil) Jean Patric	(Japan) Vissel Kobe	Full transfer
Pre-season	FW	(Japan) Hiroto Yamada	(Japan) Vegalta Sendai	Loan transfer
Pre-season	FW	(Brazil) Bruno Mendes	(Uruguay) Deportivo Maldonado	Loan expiration

== Consadole Sapporo ==
Transfers in
Join on	Pos.	Player	Moving from	Transfer type
31 Mar	MF	(Japan) Shuma Kido	(Japan) Osaka University HSS	Loan transfer; 2023 DSP
Pre-season	GK	(South Korea) Gu Sung-yun	Unattached	Full transfer
Pre-season	DF	(Japan) Seiya Baba	(Japan) Tokyo Verdy	Full transfer
Pre-season	DF	(Japan) Yamato Okada	(Japan) Fukuoka University	Loan transfer; 2023 DSP
Pre-season	MF	(Thailand) Supachok Sarachat	(Thailand) Buriram United	Full transfer; Loan made permanent
Pre-season	MF	(Japan) Yuki Kobayashi	(Japan) Vissel Kobe	Full transfer
Pre-season	FW	(Japan) Yuya Asano	(Japan) Sanfrecce Hiroshima	Full transfer
Pre-season	FW	(Japan) Shingo Omori	(Japan) Juntendo University	Free transfer

Transfers out
Leave on	Pos.	Player	Moving to	Transfer type
Pre-season	GK	(Japan) Kojiro Nakano	(Japan) Zweigen Kanazawa	Loan transfer
Pre-season	DF	(Japan) Taiyo Hama	(Japan) BTOP Thank Kuriyama	Free transfer
Pre-season	DF	(Japan) Tomoki Takamine	(Japan) Kashiwa Reysol	Loan transfer
Pre-season	MF	(Japan) Riku Danzaki	(Australia) Motherwell	Free transfer
Pre-season	MF	(Japan) Sora Igawa	(Japan) Fagiano Okayama	Loan transfer
Pre-season	FW	(Japan) Ren Fujimura	(Japan) Iwate Grulla Morioka	Full transfer
Pre-season	FW	(Japan) Yuto Iwasaki	(Japan) Sagan Tosu	Free transfer
Pre-season	FW	(Brazil) Douglas Oliveira	(Japan) Iwate Grulla Morioka	Loan transfer
Pre-season	FW	(Japan) Shinzo Koroki	(Japan) Urawa Red Diamonds	Loan expiration
Pre-season	FW	(Brazil) Gabriel Xavier	–	Contract expiration

== Gamba Osaka ==
Transfers in
Join on	Pos.	Player	Moving from	Transfer type
Pre-season	GK	(Japan) Kosei Tani	(Japan) Shonan Bellmare	Loan return
Pre-season	DF	(Japan) Riku Handa	(Japan) Montedio Yamagata	Full transfer
Pre-season	DF	(Japan) Yusei Egawa	(Japan) V-Varen Nagasaki	Full transfer
Pre-season	DF	(Japan) Yota Sato	(Japan) Vegalta Sendai	Loan return
Pre-season	DF	(Japan) Ibuki Konno	(Japan) Hosei University	Loan transfer; 2023 DSP
Pre-season	MF	(Israel) Neta Lavi	(Israel) Maccabi Haifa	Full transfer
Pre-season	MF	(Japan) Naohiro Sugiyama	(Japan) Roasso Kumamoto	Full transfer
Pre-season	MF	(Brazil) Dawhan	(Brazil) Santa Rita	Full transfer; Loan made permanent
Pre-season	MF	(Japan) Rin Mito	(Japan) Kwansei Gakuin University	Loan transfer; 2023 DSP
Pre-season	MF	(Japan) Dai Tsukamoto	(Japan) Zweigen Kanazawa	Loan return
Pre-season	FW	(Tunisia) Issam Jebali	(Denmark) Odense Boldklub	Full transfer
Pre-season	FW	(Japan) Harumi Minamino	Gamba Osaka U18s	Promotion

Transfers out
Leave on	Pos.	Player	Moving to	Transfer type
10 Mar	MF	(Japan) Kohei Okuno	(Japan) Shonan Bellmare	Loan transfer
Pre-season	GK	(Japan) Taichi Kato	–	Contract expiration
Pre-season	DF	(Japan) Gen Shoji	(Japan) Kashima Antlers	Full transfer
Pre-season	MF	(Japan) Kosuke Onose	(Japan) Shonan Bellmare	Free transfer
Pre-season	MF	(Japan) Ren Shibamoto	(Japan) Tiamo Hirakata	Free transfer
Pre-season	MF	(South Korea) Ju Se-jong	(South Korea) Daejeon Hana Citizen	Full transfer; Loan made permanent
Pre-season	MF	(Japan) Ryuta Takahashi	(Japan) Nara Club	Loan transfer
Pre-season	MF	(Japan) Mitsuki Saito	(Japan) Shonan Bellmare	Loan expiration
Pre-season	FW	(Brazil) Wellington Silva	(Brazil) Cuiabá	Free transfer
Pre-season	FW	(Brazil) Leandro Pereira	(Iran) Persepolis	Free transfer
Pre-season	FW	(Brazil) Patric	(Japan) Kyoto Sanga	Free transfer
Pre-season	FW	(Japan) Isa Sakamoto	(Japan) Fagiano Okayama	Loan transfer
Pre-season	FW	(Japan) Harumi Minamino	(Japan) Tegevajaro Miyazaki	Loan transfer

== Kashima Antlers ==
Transfers in
Join on	Pos.	Player	Moving from	Transfer type
Pre-season	GK	(South Korea) Park Eui-jeong	(South Korea) Hanyang Technical HS	Free transfer
Pre-season	DF	(Japan) Naomichi Ueda	(France) Nîmes Olympique	Full transfer
Pre-season	DF	(Japan) Gen Shoji	(Japan) Gamba Osaka	Full transfer
Pre-season	DF	(Japan) Keisuke Tsukui	(Japan) Shohei HS	Free transfer
Pre-season	MF	(Japan) Tomoya Fujii	(Japan) Sanfrecce Hiroshima	Full transfer
Pre-season	MF	(Japan) Kaishu Sano	(Japan) Machida Zelvia	Full transfer
Pre-season	MF	(Japan) Naoki Suto	(Japan) Zweigen Kanazawa	Loan return
Pre-season	FW	(Japan) Kei Chinen	(Japan) Kawasaki Frontale	Full transfer
Pre-season	FW	(Japan) Shu Morooka	(Japan) Tokyo International University	Free transfer
Pre-season	FW	(Japan) Yuki Kakita	(Japan) Sagan Tosu	Loan return
Pre-season	FW	(Japan) Itsuki Someno	(Japan) Tokyo Verdy	Loan return

Transfers out
Leave on	Pos.	Player	Moving to	Transfer type
30 March	DF	(Japan) Koki Machida	(Belgium) Union SG	Full transfer; Loan made permanent
Pre-season	GK	(Japan) Taiki Yamada	(Japan) Fagiano Okayama	Loan transfer
Pre-season	DF	(Japan) Itsuki Oda	(Japan) Avispa Fukuoka	Full transfer
Pre-season	DF	(Japan) Daiki Sugioka	(Japan) Shonan Bellmare	Full transfer; Loan made permanent
Pre-season	DF	(Japan) Naoki Hayashi	(Japan) Tokyo Verdy	Loan transfer
Pre-season	DF	(Brazil) Bueno	–	Contract expiration
Pre-season	MF	(Japan) Kento Misao	(Portugal) Santa Clara	Full transfer
Pre-season	MF	(Japan) Ryuji Izumi	(Japan) Nagoya Grampus	Full transfer
Pre-season	MF	(Japan) Yoshihiro Shimoda	(Japan) Iwaki FC	Loan transfer
Pre-season	FW	(Brazil) Everaldo	(Brazil) EC Bahia	Free transfer

== Kashiwa Reysol ==
Transfers in
Join on	Pos.	Player	Moving from	Transfer type
Pre-season	GK	(Japan) Tatsuya Morita	(Japan) Sagan Tosu	Full transfer; Loan made permanent
Pre-season	DF	(Brazil) Diego	(Japan) Sagan Tosu	Full transfer
Pre-season	DF	(Japan) Eiichi Katayama	(Japan) Shimizu S-Pulse	Full transfer
Pre-season	DF	(Japan) Yugo Tatsuta	(Japan) Shimizu S-Pulse	Full transfer
Pre-season	DF	(Japan) Tomoki Takamine	(Japan) Consadole Sapporo	Full transfer
Pre-season	MF	(Japan) Keiya Sento	(Japan) Nagoya Grampus	Full transfer
Pre-season	MF	(Japan) Kazuki Kumasawa	(Japan) Ryutsu Keizai University	Free transfer
Pre-season	MF	(Japan) Farzan Sana Mohammad	Kashiwa Reysol U18s	Promotion
Pre-season	FW	(Netherlands) Jay-Roy Grot	(Denmark) Viborg FF	Full transfer
Pre-season	FW	(Japan) Kota Yamada	(Japan) Montedio Yamagata	Full transfer
Pre-season	FW	(Japan) Riku Ochiai	(Japan) Tokyo Int. University	Free transfer
Pre-season	FW	(Japan) William Owie	(Japan) NSSU Kashiwa HS	Free transfer
Pre-season	FW	(Japan) Ota Yamamoto	Kashiwa Reysol U18s	Promotion

Transfers out
Leave on	Pos.	Player	Moving to	Transfer type
Pre-season	GK	(Japan) Haruhiko Takimoto	(Japan) FC Imabari	Full transfer; Loan made permanent
Pre-season	GK	(Japan) Kazushige Kirihata	–	Retirement
Pre-season	DF	(Japan) Takuma Ominami	(Japan) Kawasaki Frontale	Full transfer
Pre-season	DF	(Japan) Takumi Kamijima	(Japan) Yokohama F. Marinos	Full transfer
Pre-season	DF	(Japan) Kengo Kitazume	(Japan) Shimizu S-Pulse	Full transfer
Pre-season	DF	(Japan) Yuji Takahashi	(Japan) Shimizu S-Pulse	Full transfer
Pre-season	DF	(Japan) Takuma Otake	(Japan) Ehime FC	Loan transfer
Pre-season	DF	(Japan) Yuta Someya	–	Retirement
Pre-season	MF	(Brazil) Dodi	(Brazil) Santos FC	Full transfer
Pre-season	MF	(Brazil) Rodrigo Angelotti	(Japan) Omiya Ardija	Loan transfer
Pre-season	MF	(Japan) Yuto Yamada	(Japan) Tochigi SC	Loan transfer
Pre-season	MF	(Japan) Hidekazu Otani	–	Retirement
Pre-season	FW	(Brazil) Pedro Raul	(Brazil) Vasco da Gama	Full transfer
Pre-season	FW	(Japan) Kaito Mori	(Japan) Tokushima Vortis	Loan transfer

== Kawasaki Frontale ==
Transfers in
Join on	Pos.	Player	Moving from	Transfer type
13 Mar	DF	(Japan) Shuto Tanabe	(Japan) JEF United Chiba	Loan return
Pre-season	GK	(Japan) Naoto Kamifukumoto	(Japan) Kyoto Sanga	Full transfer
Pre-season	DF	(Japan) Takuma Ominami	(Japan) Kashiwa Reysol	Full transfer
Pre-season	DF	(Japan) Yuto Matsunagane	Kawasaki Frontale U18s	Promotion
Pre-season	MF	(Japan) Yuto Ozeki	Kawasaki Frontale U18s	Promotion
Pre-season	FW	(Japan) Yusuke Segawa	(Japan) Shonan Bellmare	Full transfer
Pre-season	FW	(Japan) Toya Myogan	(Japan) Riseisha HS	Free transfer
Pre-season	FW	(Japan) Shin Yamada	(Japan) Toin University of Yokohama	Free transfer
Pre-season	FW	(Japan) Taisei Miyashiro	(Japan) Sagan Tosu	Loan return

Transfers out
Leave on	Pos.	Player	Moving to	Transfer type
Pre-season	GK	(Japan) Kenta Tanno	(Japan) Iwate Grulla Morioka	Free transfer
Pre-season	DF	(Japan) Shogo Taniguchi	(Qatar) Al-Rayyan SC	Full transfer
Pre-season	DF	(Japan) Zain Issaka	(Japan) Montedio Yamagata	Full transfer
Pre-season	DF	(Japan) Kaito Kamiya	(Japan) Ventforet Kofu	Loan transfer
Pre-season	FW	(Japan) Kei Chinen	(Japan) Kashima Antlers	Full transfer
Pre-season	FW	(Japan) Taiyo Igarashi	(Japan) Renofa Yamaguchi	Loan transfer
Pre-season	FW	(Japan) Ten Miyagi	(Japan) V-Varen Nagasaki	Loan transfer

== Kyoto Sanga ==
Transfers in
Join on	Pos.	Player	Moving from	Transfer type
22 Feb	FW	(Nigeria) Origbaajo Ismaila	(Moldova) Sheriff Tiraspol	Loan transfer
Pre-season	GK	(Suriname) Warner Hahn	(Sweden) IFK Göteborg	Full transfer
Pre-season	DF	(Japan) Yuto Misao	(Japan) Oita Trinita	Full transfer
Pre-season	DF	(Japan) Osamu Henry Iyoha	(Japan) Sanfrecce Hiroshima	Full transfer
Pre-season	DF	(Japan) Shinnosuke Fukuda	(Japan) Meiji University	Free transfer
Pre-season	DF	(Japan) Yuta Ueda	Kyoto Sanga U18s	Promotion
Pre-season	MF	(Japan) Taiki Hirato	(Japan) Machida Zelvia	Full transfer
Pre-season	MF	(Japan) Daiki Kaneko	(Japan) Urawa Red; Diamonds	Full transfer; Loan made permanent
Pre-season	MF	(Japan) Kyo Sato	(Japan) Sagan Tosu	Full transfer; Loan made permanent
Pre-season	MF	(Japan) Teppei Yachida	(Japan) Tochigi SC	Loan return
Pre-season	FW	(Japan) Kazunari Ichimi	(Japan) Tokushima Vortis	Full transfer
Pre-season	FW	(Japan) Kosuke Kinoshita	(Japan) Mito HollyHock	Full transfer
Pre-season	FW	(Brazil) Patric	(Japan) Gamba Osaka	Free transfer
Pre-season	FW	(Japan) Yudai Kimura	(Japan) Kwansei Gakuin University	Free transfer
Pre-season	FW	(Japan) Sora Hiraga	Kyoto Sanga U18s	Promotion

Transfers out
Leave on	Pos.	Player	Moving to	Transfer type
11 Mar	FW	(Curaçao) Quenten Martinus	–	Released
Pre-season	GK	(Japan) Naoto Kamifukumoto	(Japan) Kawasaki Frontale	Full transfer
Pre-season	DF	(Japan) Kazuma Nagai	(Japan) Mito HollyHock	Full transfer
Pre-season	DF	(Japan) Yuki Honda	(Japan) Vissel Kobe	Free transfer
Pre-season	DF	(Japan) Kazuki Tanaka	(Japan) JEF United Chiba	Loan transfer
Pre-season	DF	(Japan) Takuya Ogiwara	(Japan) Urawa Red Diamonds	Loan expiration
Pre-season	DF	(Brazil) Holneiker Mendes	–	Contract expiration
Pre-season	MF	(Japan) Keita Nakano	(Japan) Tokushima Vortis	Full transfer
Pre-season	MF	(Japan) Kosuke Taketomi	(Japan) Ventforet Kofu	Free transfer
Pre-season	FW	(Japan) Genki Omae	(Japan) Nankatsu SC	Free transfer
Pre-season	FW	(Nigeria) Peter Utaka	(Japan) Ventforet Kofu	Free transfer

== Nagoya Grampus ==
Transfers in
Join on	Pos.	Player	Moving from	Transfer type
12 Mar	GK	(Japan) Daichi Sugimoto	(Japan) Vegalta Sendai	Full transfer
Pre-season	GK	(Japan) Daiki Mitsui	(Japan) Azul Claro Numazu	Loan expiration
Pre-season	DF	(Japan) Yuki Nogami	(Japan) Sanfrecce Hiroshima	Full transfer
Pre-season	DF	(Japan) Ei Gyotoku	(Japan) Shizuoka Gakuen HS	Free transfer
Pre-season	MF	(Japan) Ryuji Izumi	(Japan) Kashima Antlers	Full transfer
Pre-season	MF	(Japan) Riku Yamada	(Japan) Ventforet Kofu	Full transfer
Pre-season	MF	(Brazil) Thales Paula	(Japan) Roasso Kumamoto	Loan return
Pre-season	MF	(Japan) Takuji Yonemoto	(Japan) Shonan Bellmare	Loan return
Pre-season	FW	(Denmark) Kasper Junker	(Japan) Urawa Red Diamonds	Loan transfer

Transfers out
Leave on	Pos.	Player	Moving to	Transfer type
Pre-season	GK	(Japan) Hiroki Shibuya	(Japan) Ventforet Kofu	Free transfer
Pre-season	DF	(Japan) Yutaka Yoshida	(Japan) Shimizu S-Pulse	Full transfer
Pre-season	DF	(Japan) Kazuya Miyahara	(Japan) Tokyo Verdy	Free transfer
Pre-season	DF	(Japan) Akira Yoshida	(Japan) Tochigi City	Free transfer
Pre-season	DF	(Japan) Shumpei Naruse	(Japan) Montedio Yamagata	Loan transfer
Pre-season	DF	(Brazil) Tiago Pagnussat	(Japan) Cerezo Osaka	Loan expiration
Pre-season	MF	(Japan) Keiya Sento	(Japan) Kashiwa Reysol	Full transfer
Pre-season	MF	(Japan) Yoichiro Kakitani	(Japan) Tokushima Vortis	Full transfer
Pre-season	MF	(Japan) Hiroyuki Abe	(Japan) Shonan Bellmare	Full transfer; Loan made permanent
Pre-season	MF	(Brazil) Léo Silva	(Brazil) Moto Club	Free transfer
Pre-season	MF	(Japan) Yuki Soma	(Portugal) Casa Pia	Loan transfer
Pre-season	FW	(Poland) Jakub Świerczok	(Poland) Zagłębie Lubin	Full transfer

== Sagan Tosu ==
Transfers in
Join on	Pos.	Player	Moving from	Transfer type
29 Mar	FW	(Japan) Atsushi Kawata	(Japan) Omiya Ardija	Full transfer
Pre-season	GK	(Japan) Kei Uchiyama	(Japan) Fujieda MYFC	Full transfer
Pre-season	GK	(South Korea) Koh Bong-jo	(South Korea) Yongin University	Free transfer
Pre-season	DF	(Japan) So Kawahara	(Japan) Roasso Kumamoto	Full transfer
Pre-season	DF	(Japan) Kosuke Yamazaki	(Japan) Montedio Yamagata	Full transfer
Pre-season	DF	(Kenya) Teddy Akumu	Unattached	Free transfer
Pre-season	DF	(Japan) Dai Hirase	(Japan) Waseda University	Free transfer
Pre-season	DF	(Japan) Kiriya Sakamoto	(Japan) Montedio Yamagata	Loan transfer
Pre-season	DF	(Japan) Koma Osato	Sagan Tosu U18s	Promotion
Pre-season	DF	(Japan) Ryotaro Takeuchi	Sagan Tosu U18s	Promotion
Pre-season	MF	(Japan) Yoshiki Narahara	Sagan Tosu U18s	Promotion
Pre-season	MF	(Japan) Shunya Sakai	Sagan Tosu U18s	Promotion
Pre-season	FW	(Japan) Cayman Togashi	(Japan) Vegalta Sendai	Full transfer
Pre-season	FW	(Japan) Ayumu Yokoyama	(Japan) Matsumoto Yamaga	Full transfer
Pre-season	FW	(Japan) Yuto Iwasaki	(Japan) Consadole Sapporo	Free transfer
Pre-season	FW	(Japan) Oji Kawanami	(Japan) Kanto Gakuin University	Free transfer
Pre-season	FW	(Japan) Ryonosuke Kabayama	(Japan) Yokohama F. Marinos	Loan transfer
Pre-season	FW	(Japan) Yuta Fujihara	(Japan) Montedio Yamagata	Loan return

Transfers out
Leave on	Pos.	Player	Moving to	Transfer type
Pre-season	GK	(Japan) Tatsuya Morita	(Japan) Kashiwa Reysol	Full transfer; Loan made permanent
Pre-season	GK	(Japan) Keisuke Fukaya	–	Contract expiration
Pre-season	GK	(Japan) Yosei Itahashi	–	Retirement
Pre-season	DF	(Brazil) Diego	(Japan) Kashiwa Reysol	Full transfer
Pre-season	DF	(Japan) Daisuke Matsumoto	(Japan) Renofa Yamaguchi	Loan transfer
Pre-season	DF	(Japan) Ryotaro Takeuchi	(Japan) Criacao Shinjuku	Loan transfer
Pre-season	DF	(South Korea) Park Keon-woo	(South Korea) Pohang Steelers	Loan expiration
Pre-season	MF	(Japan) Taichi Fukui	(Germany) Bayern Munich II	Full transfer
Pre-season	MF	(Japan) Kei Koizumi	(Japan) FC Tokyo	Full transfer
Pre-season	MF	(Japan) Kyo Sato	(Japan) Kyoto Sanga	Full transfer; Loan made permanent
Pre-season	MF	(Japan) Ryunosuke Sagara	(Japan) Vegalta Sendai	Loan transfer
Pre-season	MF	(Japan) Yosuke Yuzawa	(Japan) J-Lease FC	Free transfer
Pre-season	FW	(Japan) Kaisei Ishii	(Japan) Yokohama FC	Free transfer
Pre-season	FW	(Japan) Yukihito Kajiya	(Japan) Blaublitz Akita	Loan transfer
Pre-season	FW	(Japan) Shunta Araki	(Japan) Machida Zelvia	Loan transfer
Pre-season	FW	(Japan) Reoto Kodama	(Japan) Suzuka Point Getters	Loan transfer
Pre-season	FW	(Japan) Yuki Kakita	(Japan) Kashima Antlers	Loan expiration
Pre-season	FW	(Japan) Taisei Miyashiro	(Japan) Kawasaki Frontale	Loan expiration
Pre-season	FW	(Kenya) Ismael Dunga	–	Contract expiration

== Sanfrecce Hiroshima ==
Transfers in
Join on	Pos.	Player	Moving from	Transfer type
Pre-season	GK	(Japan) Yudai Tanaka	(Japan) Blaublitz Akita	Full transfer
Pre-season	DF	(Japan) Takaaki Shichi	(Japan) Avispa Fukuoka	Full transfer
Pre-season	DF	(Japan) Shuto Nakano	(Japan) Toin University of Yokohama	Free transfer
Pre-season	MF	(Japan) Hiroya Matsumoto	(Japan) Zweigen Kanazawa	Loan return
Pre-season	MF	(Japan) Taichi Yamasaki	(Japan) Juntendo University	Free transfer
Pre-season	MF	(Japan) Sota Koshimichi	Sanfrecce Hiroshima U18s	Promotion

Transfers out
Leave on	Pos.	Player	Moving to	Transfer type
Pre-season	DF	(Japan) Yuki Nogami	(Japan) Nagoya Grampus	Full transfer
Pre-season	DF	(Japan) Osamu Henry Iyoha	(Japan) Kyoto Sanga	Full transfer
Pre-season	DF	(Japan) Yuta Imazu	(Japan) V-Varen Nagasaki	Full transfer
Pre-season	MF	(Japan) Tomoya Fujii	(Japan) Kashima Antlers	Full transfer
Pre-season	MF	(Japan) Kodai Dohi	(Japan) Ventforet Kofu	Loan transfer
Pre-season	MF	(Japan) Motoki Ohara	(Japan) Mito HollyHock	Loan transfer
Pre-season	FW	(Brazil) Júnior Santos	(Brazil) Fortaleza EC	Full transfer
Pre-season	FW	(Japan) Ryo Nagai	(Japan) Fagiano Okayama	Free transfer

== Shonan Bellmare ==
Transfers in
Join on	Pos.	Player	Moving from	Transfer type
10 Mar	MF	(Japan) Kohei Okuno	(Japan) Gamba Osaka	Loan transfer
Pre-season	GK	(South Korea) Song Bum-keun	(South Korea) Jeonbuk Hyundai	Free transfer
Pre-season	GK	(Japan) Hiroki Mawatari	(Japan) Fagiano Okayama	Full transfer
Pre-season	DF	(Japan) Arata Yoshida	(Japan) Rissho University	Free transfer
Pre-season	DF	(Japan) Daiki Sugioka	(Japan) Kashima Antlers	Full transfer; Loan made permanent
Pre-season	MF	(Japan) Hiroyuki Abe	(Japan) Nagoya Grampus	Full transfer; Loan made permanent
Pre-season	MF	(Japan) Kosuke Onose	(Japan) Gamba Osaka	Free transfer
Pre-season	MF	(Japan) Toru Shibata	(Japan) Waseda University	Free transfer
Pre-season	MF	(Japan) Naoya Takahashi	(Japan) Kansai University	Loan transfer; 2023 DSP
Pre-season	MF	(Japan) Ryota Nagaki	(Japan) Nagoya Grampus	Loan return
Pre-season	FW	(Japan) Keita Yamashita	(Japan) FC Tokyo	Loan transfer

Transfers out
Leave on	Pos.	Player	Moving to	Transfer type
Pre-season	GK	(Japan) Daiki Hotta	(Japan) Fagiano Okayama	Full transfer
Pre-season	GK	(Japan) Kota Sanada	(Japan) Veertien Mie	Loan transfer
Pre-season	GK	(Japan) Kosei Tani	(Japan) Gamba Osaka	Loan expiration
Pre-season	DF	(Japan) Shota Kobayashi	(Japan) Fukushima United	Free transfer
Pre-season	DF	(Japan) Hayato Fukushima	(Japan) Tochigi SC	Loan transfer
Pre-season	DF	(Japan) Taisei Ishii	(Japan) Veertien Mie	Loan transfer
Pre-season	DF	(Japan) Kodai Minoda	(Japan) Vanraure Hachinohe	Loan transfer
Pre-season	MF	(Japan) Naoki Hara	(Japan) Tiamo Hirakata	Full transfer
Pre-season	MF	(Japan) Asahi Yokokawa	(Singapore) Albirex Niigata (S)	Free transfer
Pre-season	MF	(Japan) Ryo Takahashi	(Japan) Fagiano Okayama	Free transfer
Pre-season	MF	(Japan) Hikaru Arai	(Japan) FC Imabari	Free transfer
Pre-season	MF	(Japan) Mitsuki Saito	(Japan) Vissel Kobe	Loan transfer
Pre-season	MF	(Japan) Sho Hiramatsu	(Japan) FC Ryukyu	Loan transfer
Pre-season	MF	(Japan) Takuji Yonemoto	(Japan) Nagoya Grampus	Loan expiration
Pre-season	FW	(Japan) Yusuke Segawa	(Japan) Kawasaki Frontale	Full transfer
Pre-season	FW	(Brazil) Wellington	(Japan) Avispa Fukuoka	Free transfer

== FC Tokyo ==
Transfers in
Join on	Pos.	Player	Moving from	Transfer type
Pre-season	GK	(Japan) Taishi Brandon Nozawa	(Japan) Iwate Grulla Morioka	Loan return
Pre-season	DF	(Japan) Shuhei Tokumoto	(Japan) Fagiano Okayama	Full transfer
Pre-season	DF	(Japan) Kanta Doi	FC Tokyo U18s	Promotion
Pre-season	DF	(Japan) Renta Higashi	FC Tokyo U18s	Promotion
Pre-season	MF	(Japan) Kei Koizumi	(Japan) Sagan Tosu	Full transfer
Pre-season	MF	(Japan) Yuta Arai	(Japan) Shohei HS	Free transfer
Pre-season	MF	(Japan) Hisatoshi Nishido	(Japan) Waseda University	Free transfer
Pre-season	MF	(Japan) Tsubasa Terayama	(Japan) Juntendo University	Free transfer
Pre-season	MF	(Japan) Kota Tawaratsumida	FC Tokyo U18s	Promotion
Pre-season	FW	(Japan) Teruhito Nakagawa	(Japan) Yokohama F. Marinos	Full transfer
Pre-season	FW	(Brazil) Pedro Perotti	(Brazil) Chapecoense	Loan transfer
Pre-season	FW	(Japan) Leon Nozawa	(Japan) SC Sagamihara	Loan return
Pre-season	FW	(Japan) Naoki Kumata	FC Tokyo U18s	Promotion

Transfers out
Leave on	Pos.	Player	Moving to	Transfer type
Pre-season	GK	(Japan) Akihiro Hayashi	(Japan) Vegalta Sendai	Free transfer
Pre-season	GK	(Japan) Go Hatano	(Japan) V-Varen Nagasaki	Loan transfer
Pre-season	DF	(Japan) Makoto Okazaki	(Japan) Roasso Kumamoto	Full transfer
Pre-season	DF	(Japan) Sodai Hasukawa	(Japan) Ventforet Kofu	Loan transfer
Pre-season	DF	(Japan) Rio Omori	(Japan) Omiya Ardija	Loan transfer
Pre-season	MF	(Japan) Kazuya Konno	(Japan) Avispa Fukuoka	Full transfer
Pre-season	MF	(Japan) Hirotaka Mita	(Japan) Yokohama FC	Full transfer
Pre-season	MF	(Japan) Yojiro Takahagi	(Japan) Tochigi SC	Free transfer
Pre-season	MF	(Japan) Yuki Kajiura	(Japan) Zweigen Kanazawa	Loan transfer
Pre-season	MF	(Japan) Manato Shinada	(Japan) Ventforet Kofu	Loan transfer
Pre-season	MF	(Japan) Kojiro Yasuda	(Japan) Tochigi SC	Loan transfer
Pre-season	FW	(Japan) Keita Yamashita	(Japan) Shonan Bellmare	Loan transfer
Pre-season	FW	(Brazil) Luiz Phellype	(Portugal) Sporting CP	Loan expiration

== Urawa Red Diamonds ==
Transfers in
Join on	Pos.	Player	Moving from	Transfer type
12 Mar	FW	(Guinea) José Kanté	(China) Cangzhou Mighty Lions	Free transfer
Pre-season	GK	(Japan) Shun Yoshida	(Japan) Oita Trinita	Full transfer
Pre-season	DF	(Norway) Marius Høibråten	(Norway) FK Bodø/Glimt	Full transfer
Pre-season	DF	(Japan) Takuya Ogiwara	(Japan) Kyoto Sanga	Loan return
Pre-season	MF	(Japan) Ken Iwao	(Japan) Tokushima Vortis	Full transfer; Loan made permanent
Pre-season	MF	(Japan) Yota Horiuchi	Urawa Reds U18s	Promotion
Pre-season	FW	(Japan) Toshiki Takahashi	(Japan) Roasso Kumamoto	Full transfer
Pre-season	FW	(Japan) Shinzo Koroki	(Japan) Consadole Sapporo	Loan return

Transfers out
Leave on	Pos.	Player	Moving to	Transfer type
Pre-season	GK	(Japan) Ryo Ishii	(Japan) Thespakusatsu Gunma	Free transfer
Pre-season	DF	(Japan) Yuta Miyamoto	(Belgium) KMSK Deinze	Loan transfer
Pre-season	DF	(Japan) Yudai Fujiwara	(Japan) Machida Zelvia	Loan transfer
Pre-season	DF	(Japan) Kota Kudo	(Japan) Fujieda MYFC	Loan transfer
Pre-season	DF	(Japan) Ryuya Fukushima	(Japan) Kochi United	Loan transfer
Pre-season	MF	(Japan) Daiki Kaneko	(Japan) Kyoto Sanga	Full transfer; Loan made permanent
Pre-season	MF	(Japan) Ataru Esaka	(South Korea) Ulsan Hyundai	Free transfer
Pre-season	MF	(Japan) Hidetoshi Takeda	(Japan) Mito HollyHock	Loan transfer
Pre-season	FW	(Japan) Kenyu Sugimoto	(Japan) Júbilo Iwata	Full transfer; Loan made permanent
Pre-season	FW	(Japan) Yusuke Matsuo	(Belgium) KVC Westerlo	Loan transfer
Pre-season	FW	(Denmark) Kasper Junker	(Japan) Nagoya Grampus	Loan transfer
Pre-season	FW	(Japan) Rei Kihara	(Japan) Nagano Parceiro	Loan transfer

== Vissel Kobe ==
Transfers in
Join on	Pos.	Player	Moving from	Transfer type
22 Mar	FW	(Brazil) Lincoln	(Brazil) Cruzeiro	Loan return
16 Mar	DF	(Japan) Shohei Takahashi	(Japan) Machida Zelvia	Loan transfer
Pre-season	GK	(Brazil) Phelipe Megiolaro	(Brazil) Grêmio FBPA	Free transfer
Pre-season	DF	(Brazil) Matheus Thuler	(Brazil) CR Flamengo	Full transfer; Loan made permanent
Pre-season	DF	(Japan) Yuki Honda	(Japan) Kyoto Sanga	Free transfer
Pre-season	DF	(Japan) Shogo Terasaka	Vissel Kobe U18s	Promotion
Pre-season	MF	(Japan) Haruya Ide	(Japan) Tokyo Verdy	Full transfer
Pre-season	MF	(Japan) Toya Izumi	(Japan) Biwako Seikei; Sport College	Free transfer
Pre-season	MF	(Japan) Juzo Ura	(Japan) Higashi Fukuoka HS	Free transfer
Pre-season	MF	(Japan) Mitsuki Saito	(Japan) Shonan Bellmare	Loan transfer
Pre-season	MF	(Japan) Shuto Adachi	Vissel Kobe U18s	Promotion
Pre-season	FW	(Brazil) Jean Patric	(Japan) Cerezo Osaka	Full transfer
Pre-season	FW	(Japan) Shuhei Kawasaki	(Portugal) Portimonense	Loan transfer
Pre-season	FW	(Japan) Niina Tominaga	Vissel Kobe U18s	Promotion

Transfers out
Leave on	Pos.	Player	Moving to	Transfer type
Pre-season	GK	(Japan) Hiroki Iikura	(Japan) Yokohama F. Marinos	Free transfer
Pre-season	GK	(Japan) Genta Ito	(Japan) FC Imabari	Free transfer
Pre-season	DF	(Japan) Yuki Kobayashi ('00)	(Scotland) Celtic	Full transfer
Pre-season	DF	(Japan) Nagisa Sakurauchi	(Japan) FC Imabari	Full transfer
Pre-season	DF	(Japan) Tomoaki Makino	–	Retirement
Pre-season	MF	(Japan) Yuki Kobayashi ('92)	(Japan) Consadole Sapporo	Full transfer
Pre-season	MF	(Japan) Shion Inoue	(Japan) Yokohama FC	Full transfer
Pre-season	MF	(Japan) Yuta Goke	(Japan) Vegalta Sendai	Full transfer
Pre-season	FW	(Japan) Yutaro Oda	(Scotland) Heart of Midlothian	Full transfer
Pre-season	FW	(Japan) Noriaki Fujimoto	(Japan) Kagoshima United	Free transfer
Pre-season	FW	(Spain) Bojan Krkić	–	Retirement

== Yokohama FC ==
Transfers in
Join on	Pos.	Player	Moving from	Transfer type
Pre-season	GK	(Japan) Masaki Endo	(Japan) Meiji University	Free transfer
Pre-season	GK	(Japan) Kengo Nagai	(Japan) Shimizu S-Pulse	Loan transfer
Pre-season	DF	(Japan) Kyohei Yoshino	(Japan) Vegalta Sendai	Full transfer
Pre-season	DF	(Japan) Kotaro Hayashi	(Japan) Meiji University	Free transfer
Pre-season	DF	(Japan) Kento Hashimoto	(Japan) Renofa Yamaguchi	Loan transfer
Pre-season	DF	(Japan) Shawn Van Eerden	Yokohama FC U18s	Promotion
Pre-season	MF	(Brazil) Yuri Lara	(Brazil) Vasco da Gama	Free transfer
Pre-season	MF	(Japan) Hirotaka Mita	(Japan) FC Tokyo	Full transfer
Pre-season	MF	(Japan) Shion Inoue	(Japan) Vissel Kobe	Full transfer
Pre-season	MF	(Japan) Koki Sakamoto	(Japan) Roasso Kumamoto	Full transfer
Pre-season	MF	(Japan) Mizuki Arai	(Japan) Tokyo Verdy	Full transfer
Pre-season	MF	(Japan) Tomoki Kondo	(Japan) Nihon University	Free transfer
Pre-season	MF	(Japan) Koshiro Uda	(Japan) Kokoku HS	Free transfer
Pre-season	MF	(Japan) Kazuma Takai	(Japan) Renofa Yamaguchi	Full transfer
Pre-season	MF	(Japan) Yuto Shimizu	Yokohama FC U18s	Promotion
Pre-season	MF	(Japan) Hayase Takashio	Yokohama FC U18s	Promotion
Pre-season	FW	(Brazil) Caprini	(Brazil) Londrina EC	Free transfer
Pre-season	FW	(Vietnam) Nguyễn Công Phượng	(Vietnam) Hoang Anh Gia Lai	Free transfer
Pre-season	FW	(Japan) Boniface Nduka	(Japan) Tokyo Verdy	Full transfer
Pre-season	FW	(Japan) Kaisei Ishii	(Japan) Sagan Tosu	Free transfer
Pre-season	FW	(Japan) Keijiro Ogawa	(South Korea) FC Seoul	Loan return

Transfers out
Leave on	Pos.	Player	Moving to	Transfer type
15 Mar	DF	(Japan) Hayato Sugita	(Japan) FC Gifu	Loan transfer
Pre-season	GK	(Japan) Issei Ouchi	(Japan) Kagoshima United	Loan transfer
Pre-season	DF	(Japan) Masashi Kamekawa	(Japan) Avispa Fukuoka	Full transfer
Pre-season	DF	(Japan) Daiki Nakashio	(Japan) Thespakusatsu Gunma	Full transfer
Pre-season	DF	(Japan) Kyowaan Hoshi	(Japan) Blaublitz Akita	Free transfer
Pre-season	DF	(Japan) Zain Issaka	(Japan) Kawasaki Frontale	Loan expiration
Pre-season	DF	(Japan) Hideto Takahashi	(New Zealand) Auckland United	Full transfer
Pre-season	MF	(Japan) Yuya Takagi	(Japan) Fagiano Okayama	Full transfer
Pre-season	MF	(Japan) Yuki Kusano	(Japan) Mito HollyHock	Full transfer
Pre-season	MF	(Japan) Kosuke Saito	(Japan) Tokyo Verdy	Full transfer
Pre-season	MF	(Japan) Reo Yasunaga	(Japan) Mito HollyHock	Full transfer; Loan made permanent
Pre-season	MF	(Japan) Riku Furuyado	(Japan) Kochi United	Free transfer
Pre-season	MF	(Japan) Ryo Tabei	(Japan) Fagiano Okayama	Loan transfer
Pre-season	MF	(Japan) Yushi Yamaya	(Japan) Yokohama F. Marinos	Loan expiration
Pre-season	MF	(Brazil) Rhayner	(Brazil) Tombense FC	Loan expiration
Pre-season	MF	(Japan) Shunsuke Nakamura	–	Retirement
Pre-season	MF	(Japan) Takuya Matsuura	–	Contract expiration
Pre-season	FW	(Japan) Kazuyoshi Miura	(Portugal) UD Oliveirense	Full transfer
Pre-season	FW	(Japan) Kazuma Watanabe	(Japan) Matsumoto Yamaga	Free transfer
Pre-season	FW	(Brazil) Kléber	–	Contract expiration

== Yokohama F. Marinos ==
Transfers in
Join on	Pos.	Player	Moving from	Transfer type
21 Mar	FW	(Japan) Kenyu Sugimoto	(Japan) Júbilo Iwata	Loan transfer
2 Mar	MF	(Japan) Manato Yoshida	(Japan) NIFS Kanoya	Full transfer; 2023 DSP
22 Feb	GK	(Japan) Jun Ichimori	(Japan) Gamba Osaka	Loan transfer
Pre-season	GK	(Japan) Hiroki Iikura	(Japan) Vissel Kobe	Full transfer
Pre-season	GK	(Japan) Fuma Shirasaka	(Japan) Kagoshima United	Loan return
Pre-season	DF	(Japan) Takumi Kamijima	(Japan) Kashiwa Reysol	Full transfer
Pre-season	MF	(Japan) Kenta Inoue	(Japan) Oita Trinita	Full transfer
Pre-season	MF	(Japan) Takuto Kimura	(Japan) Meiji University	Free transfer
Pre-season	MF	(Japan) Yuhi Murakami	(Japan) Kanto Gakuen University	Free transfer
Pre-season	MF	(Japan) Keigo Sakakibara	(Japan) ReinMeer Aomori	Loan return
Pre-season	FW	(Japan) Asahi Uenaka	(Japan) V-Varen Nagasaki	Full transfer

Transfers out
Leave on	Pos.	Player	Moving to	Transfer type
22 Feb	GK	(Japan) Tomoki Tagawa	(Japan) Kataller Toyama	Loan transfer
Pre-season	GK	(Japan) Yohei Takaoka	(Canada) Vancouver Whitecaps	Full transfer
Pre-season	GK	(Japan) Hirotsugu Nakabayashi	(Japan) Nankatsu SC	Free transfer
Pre-season	DF	(Japan) Ko Ikeda	(Japan) Esperanza SC	Free transfer
Pre-season	DF	(Japan) Yusuke Nishida	(Japan) Nagano Parceiro	Loan transfer
Pre-season	MF	(Japan) Naoki Tsubaki	(Japan) JEF United Chiba	Free transfer
Pre-season	MF	(Japan) Tomoki Iwata	(Scotland) Celtic FC	Loan transfer
Pre-season	MF	(Japan) Jun Amano	(South Korea) Jeonbuk Hyundai Motors	Loan transfer
Pre-season	MF	(Japan) Takumi Tsukui	(Japan) Azul Claro Numazu	Loan transfer
Pre-season	MF	(Japan) Shunsuke Hirai	(Japan) MIO Biwako Shiga	Loan transfer
Pre-season	FW	(Brazil) Léo Ceará	(Japan) Cerezo Osaka	Full transfer
Pre-season	FW	(Japan) Teruhito Nakagawa	(Japan) FC Tokyo	Full transfer
Pre-season	FW	(Japan) Ryonosuke Kabayama	(Japan) Sagan Tosu	Full transfer
Pre-season	FW	(Japan) Yushi Yamaya	(Singapore) Geylang International	Free transfer
Pre-season	FW	(Japan) Talla Ndao	(Japan) FC Osaka	Free transfer

== See also ==
- List of J2 League football transfers winter 2022–23
- List of J3 League football transfers winter 2022–23
- List of Japan Football League football transfers winter 2022–23
