= 2023 Yokohama FC season =

Yokohama FC
2023 season
- Chairman: Yuji Onodera
- Manager: Shuhei Yomoda
- Stadium: Mitsuzawa Stadium
- J1 League: 16th
- Emperor's Cup: Third round
- J.League Cup: Group stage
- Average home league attendance: 8,152
- All statistics correct as of 2 July 2023.

The 2023 season was Yokohama FC's 25th season in existence and the club's first season in the top flight of Japanese football following their promotion from J2 League. In addition to the domestic league, Yokohama FC competed in this season's edition of the Emperor's Cup and the J.League Cup.

== Players ==
=== First-team squad ===
As of 15 March 2023.

Note: Flags indicate national team as defined under FIFA eligibility rules; some limited exceptions apply. Players may hold more than one non-FIFA nationality.

| No. | Pos. | Nation | Player |
|---|---|---|---|
| 1 | GK | JPN | Kengo Nagai (on loan from Shimizu S-Pulse) |
| 2 | DF | JPN | Boniface Nduka |
| 3 | DF | JPN | Takumi Nakamura |
| 4 | MF | BRA | Yuri Lara |
| 5 | DF | BRA | Gabriel (captain) |
| 6 | MF | JPN | Takuya Wada |
| 7 | FW | JPN | Ryoya Yamashita |
| 9 | FW | BRA | Marcelo Ryan |
| 10 | FW | BRA | Caprini |
| 13 | FW | BRA | Saulo Mineiro |
| 14 | MF | JPN | Kazuma Takai |
| 15 | FW | JPN | Sho Ito |
| 16 | MF | JPN | Tatsuya Hasegawa (vice-captain) |
| 17 | DF | JPN | Eijiro Takeda (vice-captain) |
| 18 | FW | JPN | Koki Ogawa |
| 19 | DF | BRA | Mateus Moraes |
| 20 | MF | JPN | Shion Inoue |
| 21 | GK | JPN | Akinori Ichikawa |
| 22 | DF | JPN | Katsuya Iwatake (vice-captain) |

| No. | Pos. | Nation | Player |
|---|---|---|---|
| 25 | MF | JPN | Hirotaka Mita (vice-captain) |
| 26 | DF | JPN | Kotaro Hayashi |
| 27 | DF | JPN | Kyohei Yoshino |
| 28 | FW | VIE | Nguyễn Công Phượng |
| 29 | FW | JPN | Kaisei Ishii |
| 30 | MF | JPN | Towa Yamane |
| 31 | FW | JPN | Koki Sakamoto |
| 32 | DF | JPN | Shawn van Eerden |
| 33 | MF | JPN | Tomoki Kondo |
| 34 | DF | JPN | Taiga Nishiyama |
| 35 | MF | JPN | Koshiro Uda |
| 36 | MF | JPN | Hayase Takashio |
| 37 | MF | JPN | Yuto Shimizu |
| 41 | MF | JPN | Mizuki Arai |
| 42 | DF | JPN | Kento Hashimoto (on loan from Renofa Yamaguchi) |
| 44 | GK | JPN | Yuji Rokutan |
| 49 | GK | GER | Svend Brodersen |
| 50 | FW | JPN | Keijiro Ogawa |

=== Out on loan ===
Note: Flags indicate national team as defined under FIFA eligibility rules; some limited exceptions apply. Players may hold more than one non-FIFA nationality.

| No. | Pos. | Nation | Player |
|---|---|---|---|
| 11 | FW | JPN | Kazuyoshi Miura (at (Portugal) Oliveirense) |
| 23 | DF | JPN | Hayato Sugita (at FC Gifu) |
| 40 | GK | JPN | Masaki Endo (at Mito HollyHock) |

| No. | Pos. | Nation | Player |
|---|---|---|---|
| — | GK | JPN | Issei Ouchi (at Kagoshima United) |
| — | MF | JPN | Ryo Tabei (at Fagiano Okayama) |
| — | MF | JPN | Kohei Tezuka (at Sagan Tosu) |

== Transfers ==
Transfers in
| Join on | Pos. | Player | Moving from | Transfer type |
|---|---|---|---|---|
| Pre-season | GK | (Japan) Masaki Endo | (Japan) Meiji University | Free transfer |
| Pre-season | GK | (Japan) Kengo Nagai | (Japan) Shimizu S-Pulse | Loan transfer |
| Pre-season | DF | (Japan) Kyohei Yoshino | (Japan) Vegalta Sendai | Full transfer |
| Pre-season | DF | (Japan) Kotaro Hayashi | (Japan) Meiji University | Free transfer |
| Pre-season | DF | (Japan) Kento Hashimoto | (Japan) Renofa Yamaguchi | Loan transfer |
| Pre-season | DF | (Japan) Shawn Van Eerden | Yokohama FC U18s | Promotion |
| Pre-season | MF | (Brazil) Yuri Lara | (Brazil) Vasco da Gama | Free transfer |
| Pre-season | MF | (Japan) Hirotaka Mita | (Japan) FC Tokyo | Full transfer |
| Pre-season | MF | (Japan) Shion Inoue | (Japan) Vissel Kobe | Full transfer |
| Pre-season | MF | (Japan) Koki Sakamoto | (Japan) Roasso Kumamoto | Full transfer |
| Pre-season | MF | (Japan) Mizuki Arai | (Japan) Tokyo Verdy | Full transfer |
| Pre-season | MF | (Japan) Tomoki Kondo | (Japan) Nihon University | Free transfer |
| Pre-season | MF | (Japan) Koshiro Uda | (Japan) Kokoku HS | Free transfer |
| Pre-season | MF | (Japan) Kazuma Takai | (Japan) Renofa Yamaguchi | Full transfer |
| Pre-season | MF | (Japan) Yuto Shimizu | Yokohama FC U18s | Promotion |
| Pre-season | MF | (Japan) Hayase Takashio | Yokohama FC U18s | Promotion |
| Pre-season | FW | (Brazil) Caprini | (Brazil) Londrina EC | Free transfer |
| Pre-season | FW | (Vietnam) Nguyễn Công Phượng | (Vietnam) Hoang Anh Gia Lai | Free transfer |
| Pre-season | FW | (Japan) Boniface Nduka | (Japan) Tokyo Verdy | Full transfer |
| Pre-season | FW | (Japan) Kaisei Ishii | (Japan) Sagan Tosu | Free transfer |
| Pre-season | FW | (Japan) Keijiro Ogawa | (South Korea) FC Seoul | Loan return |

Transfers out
| Leave on | Pos. | Player | Moving to | Transfer type |
|---|---|---|---|---|
| 2 Jul | FW | (Japan) Koki Ogawa | (Netherlands) NEC Nijmegen | Full transfer |
| 15 Mar | DF | (Japan) Hayato Sugita | (Japan) FC Gifu | Loan transfer |
| Pre-season | GK | (Japan) Issei Ouchi | (Japan) Kagoshima United | Loan transfer |
| Pre-season | DF | (Japan) Masashi Kamekawa | (Japan) Avispa Fukuoka | Full transfer |
| Pre-season | DF | (Japan) Daiki Nakashio | (Japan) Thespakusatsu Gunma | Full transfer |
| Pre-season | DF | (Japan) Kyowaan Hoshi | (Japan) Blaublitz Akita | Free transfer |
| Pre-season | DF | (Japan) Zain Issaka | (Japan) Kawasaki Frontale | Loan expiration |
| Pre-season | DF | (Japan) Hideto Takahashi | (New Zealand) Auckland United | Full transfer |
| Pre-season | MF | (Japan) Yuya Takagi | (Japan) Fagiano Okayama | Full transfer |
| Pre-season | MF | (Japan) Yuki Kusano | (Japan) Mito HollyHock | Full transfer |
| Pre-season | MF | (Japan) Kosuke Saito | (Japan) Tokyo Verdy | Full transfer |
| Pre-season | MF | (Japan) Reo Yasunaga | (Japan) Mito HollyHock | Full transfer; Loan made permanent |
| Pre-season | MF | (Japan) Riku Furuyado | (Japan) Kochi United | Free transfer |
| Pre-season | MF | (Japan) Ryo Tabei | (Japan) Fagiano Okayama | Loan transfer |
| Pre-season | MF | (Japan) Yushi Yamaya | (Japan) Yokohama F. Marinos | Loan expiration |
| Pre-season | MF | (Brazil) Rhayner | (Brazil) Tombense FC | Loan expiration |
| Pre-season | MF | (Japan) Shunsuke Nakamura | – | Retirement |
| Pre-season | MF | (Japan) Takuya Matsuura | – | Contract expiration |
| Pre-season | FW | (Japan) Kazuyoshi Miura | (Portugal) UD Oliveirense | Loan transfer |
| Pre-season | FW | (Japan) Kazuma Watanabe | (Japan) Matsumoto Yamaga | Free transfer |
| Pre-season | FW | (Brazil) Kléber | – | Contract expiration |

== Competitions ==
=== Overview ===
| Competition | First match | Last match | Starting round | Final position | Record | | | | | | | |
| Competition | First match | Last match | Starting round | Final position | Pld | W | D | L | GF | GA | GD | Win % |
|---|---|---|---|---|---|---|---|---|---|---|---|---|
| J1 League | 18 February 2023 | 12 November 2023 | Matchday 1 | | 32 | 7 | 8 | 17 | 30 | 55 | −25 | 21.88 |
| Emperor's Cup | 21 June 2023 | | Second round | | 2 | 1 | 0 | 1 | 4 | 1 | +3 | 50.00 |
| J.League Cup | 8 March 2023 | 18 June 2023 | Group stage | Group stage | 6 | 2 | 0 | 4 | 7 | 10 | −3 | 33.33 |
| Total | | | | | 40 | 10 | 8 | 22 | 41 | 66 | −25 | 25.00 |

Last updated: 2 July 2023
Source: Soccerway

=== J1 League ===
==== League table ====
| Pos | Team | Pld | W | D | L | GF | GA | GD | Pts | Qualification or relegation |
|---|---|---|---|---|---|---|---|---|---|---|
| 14 | Sagan Tosu | 34 | 9 | 11 | 14 | 43 | 47 | −4 | 38 | |
| 15 | Shonan Bellmare | 34 | 8 | 10 | 16 | 40 | 56 | −16 | 34 | |
| 16 | Gamba Osaka | 34 | 9 | 7 | 18 | 38 | 61 | −23 | 34 | |
| 17 | Kashiwa Reysol | 34 | 6 | 15 | 13 | 33 | 47 | −14 | 33 | |
| 18 | Yokohama FC (R) | 34 | 7 | 8 | 19 | 31 | 58 | −27 | 29 | Relegation to the J2 League |

Source: JLeague.jp, J.League Data Site
Rules for classification: 1) Points; 2) Goal difference; 3) Goals scored; 4) Head-to-head points; 5) Head-to-head goal difference; 6) Head-to-head goals scored; 7) Fewer disciplinary points.
(R) Relegated

==== Matches ====
The league fixtures were announced on 20 January 2023.

| 18 February 2023 1 | Yokohama FC | 0–1 | Nagoya Grampus | Yokohama |
| 14:03 | Yuri (yellow card) 22'; Caprini (yellow card) 73'; Nakamura (yellow card) 90+7'; Ogawa (yellow card) 90+8' | Report | Morishita (yellow card) 66'; Junker 4' | Stadium: Mitsuzawa Stadium; Attendance: 11,186; Referee: Akihiko Ikeuchi |

| 24 February 2023 2 | Shonan Bellmare | 2–2 | Yokohama FC | Hiratsuka |
| | | Report | | Stadium: Lemon Gas Stadium Hiratsuka |

| 4 March 2023 3 | Yokohama FC | 1–3 | Kashima Antlers | Yokohama |
| | | | | Stadium: Mitsuzawa Stadium |

| 12 March 2023 4 | FC Tokyo | 3–1 | Yokohama FC | Chōfu |
| | | | | Stadium: Ajinomoto Stadium |

| 18 March 2023 5 | Yokohama FC | 1–4 | Kyoto Sanga | Yokohama |
| | | | | Stadium: Mitsuzawa Stadium |

| 1 April 2023 6 | Yokohama FC | 1–1 | Avispa Fukuoka | Yokohama |
| 14:00 | Kondo (yellow card) 38'; Caprini (yellow card) 42'; Ogawa 45+9' (pen.); Yoshino (yellow card) 88' | Report | Yamagishi 16'; Oda (yellow card) 75'; Wellington (yellow card) 90+1' | Stadium: Mitsuzawa Stadium; Attendance: 4,876; Referee: Hiroki Kasahara |

| 8 April 2023 7 | Yokohama F. Marinos | 5–0 | Yokohama FC | Yokohama |
| | | Report | | Stadium: Nissan Stadium |

| 15 April 2023 8 | Yokohama FC | 0–3 | Sanfrecce Hiroshima | Yokohama |
| | | Report | | Stadium: Mitsuzawa Stadium |

| 23 April 2023 9 | Gamba Osaka | 1–1 | Yokohama FC | Suita |
| | | Report | | Stadium: Panasonic Stadium Suita |

| 29 April 2023 10 | Yokohama FC | 1–4 | Hokkaido Consadole Sapporo | Yokohama |
| 14:03 | Kondo 1' | Report | Asano 39', 60'; Ogashiwa 45+1'; Tanaka 90+3' | Stadium: Mitsuzawa Stadium; Attendance: 7,634; Referee: Ryo Tanimoto |

| 3 May 2023 11 | Yokohama FC | 1–0 | Albirex Niigata | Yokohama |
| 19:03 | Yuri 53' | Report | | Stadium: Mitsuzawa Stadium; Attendance: 10,134; Referee: Yoshimi Yamashita |

| 7 May 2023 12 | Vissel Kobe | 3–0 | Yokohama FC | Kobe |
| 14:03 | Osako 45+1' (pen.), 52'; Sasaki 54' | Report | Yoshino (yellow card) 19'; Mineiro (yellow card) 62' | Stadium: Noevir Stadium Kobe; Attendance: 20,005; Referee: Takafumi Mikuriya |

| 13 May 2023 13 | Kashiwa Reysol | 0–1 | Yokohama FC | Kashiwa |
| 16:03 | | Report | Yuri (yellow card) 15'; Kondo (yellow card) 37'; Inoue (yellow card) 59'; Ogawa (yellow card) 39', (goal) 69' (pen.) | Stadium: Sankyo Frontier Kashiwa Stadium; Attendance: 8,111; Referee: Hayato Shimizu |

| 20 May 2023 14 | Yokohama FC | 2–1 | Kawasaki Frontale | Yokohama |
| 16:00 JST | Inoue 44'; Yamashita 48'; Yoshino (yellow card) 67' | Report | Seko 68' | Stadium: Nippatsu Mitsuzawa Stadium; Attendance: 10,276; Referee: Akihiko Ikeuchi |

| 28 May 2023 15 | Cerezo Osaka | 2–0 | Yokohama FC | Yokohama |
| 14:00 JST | Tameda 43'; Nakahara 85' | Report | | Stadium: Nippatsu Mitsuzawa Stadium; Attendance: 14,304; Referee: Jumpei Iida |

| 3 June 2023 16 | Yokohama FC | 1–2 | Sagan Tosu | Yokohama |
| 18:30 JST | Caprini (yellow card) 36'; Marcelo Ryan 78'; Takai (yellow card) 90+4' | Report | Tezuka (yellow card) 31'; Naganuma 55', 73' | Stadium: Nippatsu Mitsuzawa Stadium; Attendance: 7,158; Referee: Koei Koya |

| 11 June 2023 17 | Yokohama FC | 0–0 | Urawa Red Diamonds | Yokohama |
| 18:30 JST | | Report | | Stadium: Nippatsu Mitsuzawa Stadium; Attendance: 10,086; Referee: Hayato Shimizu |

| 24 June 2023 18 | Kyoto Sanga | 2–1 | Yokohama FC | Kyoto |
| 19:00 JST | Asada 84'; Patric 87'; Hirato (yellow card) 90+9' | Report | Mita (red card) 45+2'; Yuri Lara (yellow card) 58'; Ito 74'; Mateus (yellow card) 75' | Stadium: Sanga Stadium by Kyocera; Attendance: 8,784; Referee: Akihiko Ikeuchi |

| 1 July 2023 19 | Yokohama FC | 0–0 | Gamba Osaka | Yokohama |
| 18:30 JST | | Report | Fukuoka (yellow card) 24' | Stadium: Nippatsu Mitsuzawa Stadium; Attendance: 10,348; Referee: Koichiro Fukushima |

| 8 July 2023 20 | Kawasaki Frontale | v | Yokohama FC | Kawasaki |
| 19:00 JST | | | | Stadium: Kawasaki Todoroki Stadium |

| 16 July 2023 21 | Sanfrecce Hiroshima | v | Yokohama FC | Hiroshima |
| 18:00 JST | | | | Stadium: Edion Stadium Hiroshima |

| 6 August 2023 22 | Yokohama FC | v | Vissel Kobe | Yokohama |
| 18:30 JST | | | | Stadium: Nippatsu Mitsuzawa Stadium |

| 12 August 2023 23 | Avispa Fukuoka | v | Yokohama FC | Fukuoka |
| 19:00 JST | | | | Stadium: Best Denki Stadium |

| 20 August 2023 24 | Yokohama FC | v | Cerezo Osaka | Yokohama |
| 18:30 JST | | | | Stadium: Nippatsu Mitsuzawa Stadium |

| 26 August 2023 25 | Yokohama FC | v | Yokohama F. Marinos | Yokohama |
| 18:30 JST | | | | Stadium: Nippatsu Mitsuzawa Stadium |

| 1 September 2023 26 | Nagoya Grampus | v | Yokohama FC | Toyota |
| --:00 JST | | | | Stadium: Toyota Soccer Stadium |

| 15 September 2023 27 | Yokohama FC | v | Kashiwa Reysol | Yokohama |
| --:00 JST | | | | Stadium: Nippatsu Mitsuzawa Stadium |

| 22 September 2023 28 | Albirex Niigata | v | Yokohama FC | Niigata |
| --:00 JST | | | | Stadium: Denka Big Swan Stadium |

| 29 September 2023 29 | Urawa Red Diamonds | v | Yokohama FC | Saitama |
| --:00 JST | | | | Stadium: Saitama Stadium 2002 |

| 20 October 2023 30 | Yokohama FC | v | FC Tokyo | Yokohama |
| --:00 JST | | | | Stadium: Nippatsu Mitsuzawa Stadium |

| 27 October 2023 31 | Hokkaido Consadole Sapporo | v | Yokohama FC | Sapporo |
| --:00 JST | | | | Stadium: Sapporo Dome |

| 10 November 2023 32 | Sagan Tosu | v | Yokohama FC | Tosu |
| --:00 JST | | | | Stadium: Ekimae Real Estate Stadium |

| 24 November 2023 33 | Yokohama FC | v | Shonan Bellmare | Yokohama |
| --:00 JST | | | | Stadium: Nippatsu Mitsuzawa Stadium |

| 2 December 2023 34 | Kashima Antlers | v | Yokohama FC | Kashima |
| --:00 JST | | | | Stadium: Kashima Soccer Stadium |

=== Emperor's Cup ===
| 21 June 2023 Second round | Yokohama FC | 4–1 | Iwate Grulla Morioka | Yokohama |
| 19:00 | Nakamura (yellow card) 32' (goal) 35'; Sakamoto (yellow card) 38'; Ito (yellow card) 42'; Saulo Mineiro 68', 73' (yellow card) 76'; Own goal 79' | Report | Matsubara 15'; Fukagawa (yellow card) 26' | Stadium: Mitsuzawa Stadium; Attendance: 1,820; Referee: Jumpei Iida |

| 12 July 2023 Third round | Kochi United | v | Yokohama FC | Kochi |
| 19:00 | | Report | | Stadium: Kochi Haruno Athletic Stadium |

=== J.League Cup ===
| Pos | Team | Pld | W | D | L | GF | GA | GD | Pts | Qualification |
|---|---|---|---|---|---|---|---|---|---|---|
| 1 | Nagoya Grampus | 6 | 5 | 0 | 1 | 11 | 5 | +6 | 15 | Advance to knockout stage |
| 2 | Sanfrecce Hiroshima | 6 | 3 | 0 | 3 | 12 | 7 | +5 | 9 | |
| 3 | Yokohama FC | 6 | 2 | 0 | 4 | 7 | 10 | −3 | 6 (Note: Head-to-head points: Yokohama FC 3, Vissel Kobe 3. Head-to-head goal differences: Yokohama FC +1, Vissel Kobe –1.) | |
| 4 | Vissel Kobe | 6 | 2 | 0 | 4 | 4 | 12 | −8 | 6 | |

Source: JLeague.co (EN), JLeague.jp (JA)
Rules for classification: Tiebreakers
Notes:

| 8 March 2023 | Sanfrecce Hiroshima | 3–1 | Yokohama FC | Hiroshima |
| 19:03 | Mitsuta 75'; Sasaki 80'; Sugita 88' (o.g.) | JLeague.co (EN); JLeague.jp (JA) | Caprini 59' | Stadium: Edion Stadium Hiroshima; Attendance: 5,249; Referee: Tetsuro Yoshida |

| 26 March 2023 | Yokohama FC | 0–1 | Vissel Kobe | Yokohama |
| 14:03 | | JLeague.co (EN); JLeague.jp (JA) | Osako 85' | Stadium: Nippatsu Mitsuzawa Stadium; Attendance: 3,813; Referee: Yoshiro Imamura |

| 5 April 2023 | Nagoya Grampus | 3–2 | Yokohama FC | Nagoya |
| 19:33 | Sakai 45+1', 90'; Nagai 78' | JLeague.co (EN); JLeague.jp (JA) | Nakamura 28'; Ito 42' | Stadium: Toyota Stadium; Attendance: 6,465; Referee: Atsushi Kamimura |

| 19 April 2023 | Yokohama FC | 0–2 | Nagoya Grampus | Yokohama |
| 19:03 | | JLeague.co (EN); JLeague.jp (JA) | Kida 41', 52' | Stadium: Nippatsu Mitsuzawa Stadium; Attendance: 2,818; Referee: Akihiko Ikeuchi |

| 24 May 2023 | Yokohama FC | 1–0 | Sanfrecce Hiroshima | Yokohama |
| 19:03 | Lara 29' | JLeague.co (EN); JLeague.jp (JA) | | Stadium: Nippatsu Mitsuzawa Stadium; Attendance: 2,754; Referee: Hiroyuki Kimura |

| 18 June 2023 | Vissel Kobe | 1–3 | Yokohama FC | Kobe |
| 18:00 | Ozaki (red card) 3'; Jean Patric 8' | JLeague.co (EN); JLeague.jp (JA) | Yamashita 20', 30'; Marcelo Ryan 73' | Stadium: Noevir Stadium Kobe; Attendance: 5,430; Referee: Yusuke Araki |
