= 2024 JEF United Chiba season =

JEF United Chiba
2024 season
- Manager: Yoshiyuki Kobayashi
- Stadium: Fukuda Denshi Arena
- J2 League: 7th
- Emperor's Cup: Quarter-finals
- J.League Cup: First round – Round 1
- Top goalscorer: League: Hiiro Komori (22); All: Hiiro Komori (22)
- Biggest win: JEF United Chiba 8–0 Tochigi SC

The 2024 season was the 78th year since the founding of JEF United Chiba and the 15th consecutive season in the Japanese J2 League. In addition to the domestic league, the club also participated in the Emperor's Cup and the J.League Cup.

== Transfers ==
=== In ===
Pos.	Player	Transferred from	Fee	Date	Source
DF	(Japan) Daiki Ogawa	(Japan) Júbilo Iwata	Loan	8 July 2024	
MF	(Japan) Naohiro Sugiyama	(Japan) Gamba Osaka	Loan	24 July 2024	

== Competitions ==
=== Overall record ===
Competition	First match	Last match	Starting round	Final position	Record							
Competition	First match	Last match	Starting round	Final position	Pld	W	D	L	GF	GA	GD	Win %
J2 League	25 February 2024	10 November 2024	Matchday 1	7th	38	19	4	15	67	48	+19	50.00
Emperor's Cup	12 June 2024	18 September 2024	Second round	Quarter-finals	4	3	0	1	5	5	+0	75.00
J.League Cup	6 March 2024		First round – Round 1	First round – Round 1	1	0	0	1	0	1	−1	0.00
Total					43	22	4	17	72	54	+18	51.16

Source: Competitions

=== J2 League ===
==== League table ====
Pos	Team	Pld	W	D	L	GF	GA	GD	Pts	Promotion or relegation
5	Fagiano Okayama (O, P)	38	17	14	7	48	29	+19	65	Qualification for the promotion play-offs
6	Vegalta Sendai	38	18	10	10	50	44	+6	64	Qualification for the promotion play-offs
7	JEF United Chiba	38	19	4	15	67	48	+19	61	
8	Tokushima Vortis	38	16	7	15	42	44	−2	55	
9	Iwaki FC	38	15	9	14	53	41	+12	54	

Source: Meiji Yasuda J2 League, J.League Data Site
Rules for classification: 1) Points; 2) Goal difference; 3) Goals scored; 4) Head-to-head points; 5) Head-to-head goal difference; 6) Head-to-head goal scored; 7) Fair-play points.
(O) Play-off winners; (P) Promoted

==== Results summary ====
Overall								Home						Away					
Pld	W	D	L	GF	GA	GD	Pts	W	D	L	GF	GA	GD	W	D	L	GF	GA	GD
38	19	4	15	67	48	+19	61	12	1	6	46	23	+23	7	3	9	21	25	−4

==== Results by round ====
Round	1	2	3	4	5	6	7	8	9	10	11	12	13	14	15	16	17	18	19	20	21	22	23	24	25	26	27	28	29	30	31	32	33	34	35	36	37	38
Ground	H	H	A	A	H	A	A	H	A	H	H	A	A	H	A	H	A	H	A	H	A	H	A	H	A	A	H	H	A	H	A	H	A	H	H	A	H	A
Result	L	W	W	L	L	D	L	W	W	D	L	W	L	W	D	W	L	W	W	W	L	W	L	L	L	D	L	W	W	W	L	W	W	W	W	W	L	L
Position	15	8	3	8	12	11	16	13	9	10	12	10	12	9	9	8	8	7	7	7	7	6	7	7	8	8	8	8	7	7	7	6	6	4	4	4	6	7

A = Away; H = Home; W = Win; D = Draw; L = Loss

==== Matches ====
The league schedule was released on 23 January.

25 February 2024 1	JEF United Chiba	2–3	Montedio Yamagata

2 March 2024 2	JEF United Chiba	4–0	Fujieda MYFC

10 March 2024 3	Thespa Gunma	1–3	JEF United Chiba

16 March 2024 4	Kagoshima United	4–2	JEF United Chiba

20 March 2024 5	JEF United Chiba	1–3	Shimizu S-Pulse

24 March 2024 6	Mito Hollyhock	0–0	JEF United Chiba

30 March 2024 7	Roasso Kumamoto	1–0	JEF United Chiba

3 April 2024 8	JEF United Chiba	8–0	Tochigi SC

7 April 2024 9	Tokushima Vortis	0–1	JEF United Chiba

13 April 2024 10	JEF United Chiba	1–1	Oita Trinita

21 April 2024 11	JEF United Chiba	1–2	Blaublitz Akita

27 April 2024 12	Vegalta Sendai	0–2	JEF United Chiba

3 May 2024 13	Iwaki FC	1–0	JEF United Chiba

6 May 2024 14	JEF United Chiba	1–0	Yokohama FC

12 May 2024 15	Ventforet Kofu	2–2	JEF United Chiba

18 May 2024 16	JEF United Chiba	7–1	Ehime FC

25 May 2024 17	V-Varen Nagasaki	1–0	JEF United Chiba

1 June 2024 18	JEF United Chiba	2–1	Fagiano Okayama

8 June 2024 19	Renofa Yamaguchi	1–2	JEF United Chiba

16 June 2024 20	JEF United Chiba	1–0	Tokushima Vortis

22 June 2024 21	Tochigi SC	2–1	JEF United Chiba

30 June 2024 22	JEF United Chiba	2–1	Kagoshima United

6 July 2024 23	Shimizu S-Pulse	2–0	JEF United Chiba

14 July 2024 24	JEF United Chiba	0–2	Roasso Kumamoto

3 August 2024 25	Yokohama FC	2–1	JEF United Chiba

10 August 2024 26	Fagiano Okayama	0–0	JEF United Chiba

17 August 2024 27	JEF United Chiba	0–3	Iwaki FC

25 August 2024 28	JEF United Chiba	4–2	Vegalta Sendai

1 September 2024 29	Oita Trinita	0–2	JEF United Chiba

7 September 2024 30	JEF United Chiba	4–0	Mito Hollyhock

14 September 2024 31	Blaublitz Akita	1–0	JEF United Chiba

21 September 2024 32	JEF United Chiba	4–1	Renofa Yamaguchi

29 September 2024 33	Ehime FC	1–2	JEF United Chiba

5 October 2024 34	JEF United Chiba	1–0	Thespa Gunma

19 October 2024 35	JEF United Chiba	2–1	Ventforet Kofu

26 October 2024 36	Fujieda MYFC	2–3	JEF United Chiba

3 November 2024 37	JEF United Chiba	1–2	V-Varen Nagasaki

10 November 2024 38	Montedio Yamagata	4–0	JEF United Chiba

=== Emperor's Cup ===
12 June 2024 Second round	JEF United Chiba	2–1	Chukyo University

10 July 2024 Third round	Tokyo FC	1–2	JEF United Chiba

21 August 2024 Round of 16	JEF United Chiba	1–0	Hokkaido Consadole Sapporo

18 September 2024 Quarter-finals	Kyoto Sanga	3–0	JEF United Chiba

=== J.League Cup ===
6 March 2024 First round – Round 1	Kagoshima United	1–0	JEF United Chiba
