= Saulo Mineiro =

Brazilian footballer

Personal information
- Full name: Saulo Rodrigues da Silva
- Date of birth: 17 June 1997 (age 29)
- Place of birth: Uberlândia, Brazil
- Height: 1.80 m (5 ft 11 in)
- Position: Forward

Team information
- Current team: Ceará
- Number: 73

Youth career
- 2011–2017: Uberlândia
- 2017: → América Mineiro (loan)

Senior career*
Years	Team	Apps	(Gls)
2017–2018	Uberlândia	14	(1)
2018	Uberaba	6	(0)
2018	Araxá	9	(2)
2019	Tupi	7	(0)
2019	CRAC	6	(0)
2019–2020	Volta Redonda	30	(10)
2020–2021	Ceará	32	(8)
2021–2023	Yokohama FC	35	(8)
2023–2024	Ceará	50	(14)
2025–2026	Shanghai Shenhua	22	(10)
2026–	Ceará	8	(3)
- * Club domestic league appearances and goals as of 18 November 2026

Saulo Rodrigues da Silva (born 17 June 1997), known as Saulo Mineiro or simply Saulo, is a Brazilian professional footballer who plays for Ceará as a forward.

== Career ==
Saulo was born in Uberlândia, Minas Gerais, and represented hometown side Uberlândia EC as a youth. He made his first team debut on 28 March 2017, in a 2–2 Campeonato Mineiro home draw against Cruzeiro; after coming on as a 61st minute substitute, he had to leave the field two minutes later due to an arm injury.

Saulo spent the rest of the 2017 campaign on loan at América Mineiro's under-20 squad. For the 2018 campaign, after again playing for Uberlândia, he also represented Uberaba and Araxá.

In April 2019, after brief stints at Tupi and CRAC, Saulo signed for Volta Redonda. On 4 September, he renewed his contract until 2021.

On 18 September 2020, after scoring five goals in only six matches of the 2020 Série C, Saulo moved straight to Série A with Ceará. He made his debut for the club on 25 October, replacing Cléber in a 2–1 home win against Coritiba.

Saulo scored his first goal in the top tier on 30 November 2020, netting his team's third in a 4–1 away success over Vasco da Gama.

== Career statistics ==
As of match played 21 March 2026

Appearances and goals by club, season and competition
Club	Season	League			State League		Cup		Continental		Other		Total	
Club	Season	Division	Apps	Goals	Apps	Goals	Apps	Goals	Apps	Goals	Apps	Goals	Apps	Goals
Uberlândia	2017	Mineiro	—		1	0	—		—		—		1	0
Uberlândia	2018	Série D	4	0	9	1	0	0	—		—		13	1
Uberlândia	Total		4	0	10	1	0	0	—		—		14	1
Uberaba	2018	Mineiro Módulo II	—		6	0	—		—		—		6	0
Araxá	2018	Mineiro 2ª Divisão	—		9	2	—		—		—		9	2
Tupi	2019	Série D	0	0	7	0	1	0	—		—		8	0
CRAC	2019	Goiano	—		6	0	—		—		—		6	0
Volta Redonda	2019	Série C	12	0	—		—		—		1 (Note: Appearance(s) in Copa Rio)	1	13	1
Volta Redonda	2020	Série C	6	5	12	5	1	0	—		—		19	10
Volta Redonda	Total		18	5	12	5	1	0	—		1	1	32	11
Ceará	2020	Série A	17	4	1	0	—		—		—		18	4
Ceará	2021	Série A	9	2	5	2	2	0	4 (Note: Appearance(s) in Copa Sudamericana)	0	11 (Note: Appearance(s) in Copa do Nordeste)	4	31	8
Ceará	Total		26	6	6	2	2	0	4	0	11	4	49	12
Yokohama FC	2021	J1 League	11	4	—		—		—		—		11	4
Yokohama FC	2022	J2 League	19	4	—		1	0	—		—		20	4
Yokohama FC	2023	J1 League	9	0	—		2	2	—		2 (Note: Appearance(s) in J.League Cup)	0	13	2
Yokohama FC	Total		39	8	—		3	2	—		2	0	44	10
Ceará	2024	Série b	30	11	6	2	1	0	—		8	0	45	13
Shanghai Shenhua	2025	Chinese Super League	14	8	—		0	0	8 (Note: Appearance(s) in AFC Champions League Elite)	4	1 (Note: Appearance(s) in Chinese Super Cup)	0	11	4
Shanghai Shenhua	2026	Chinese Super League	1	0	—		0	0	2	0	—		20	4
Shanghai Shenhua	Total		15	8	—		0	0	10	4	1	0	26	12
Career total			132	38	62	12	8	2	14	4	23	5	239	61

== Honours ==
Ceará

- Campeonato Cearense: 2024

Shanghai Shenhua

- Chinese FA Super Cup: 2025
