= Claudinho (footballer, born 1968) =

Brazilian association footballer

Personal information
- Full name: Claudio da Silva Pinto
- Date of birth: 12 June 1968 (age 58)
- Place of birth: Brazil
- Positions: Midfielder; striker

Senior career*
| Years | Team | Apps | (Gls) |
| 1986–1992 | Juventude | | |
| 1993–1994 | Cerro Porteño | | |
| 1994 | Santo André | | |
| 1994 | Vitória | | |
| 1994 | Barcelona | | |
| 1995 | Atlético Goianiense | | |
| 1996 | Bahia | | |
| 1997–1999 | Atlético Morelia | | |
| 1999–2000 | Monterrey | | |
| 2000 | Pachuca | | |
| 2001 | Puebla | | |
| 2001–2002 | La Piedad | | |
| 2002 | Celaya | | |
| 2003 | Colibríes de Morelos | | |
| 2003–2004 | Pachuca | | |
| 2004 | Huracanes de Colima | | |
| 2005–2006 | Porto Alegre | | |
- * Club domestic league appearances and goals

Claudio da Silva Pinto (born 12 June 1968) is a Brazilian former footballer who last played as a midfielder or striker for Porto Alegre.

== Early life ==
Claudinho is a native of Bom Jesus, Rio Grande do Sul, Brazil.

== Playing career ==
In 1997, he signed for Mexican side Atlético Morelia. In 1999, he signed for Mexican side Monterrey.

== Style of play ==
Claudinho mainly operated as a striker and was known for "his physique that was not as athletic as possible".

== Post-playing career ==
After retiring from professional football, Claudinho worked as a businessman in Brazil.

== Personal life ==
Claudinho has two sons. One of them, is also a footballer (Mauricio Caprini).
