= Riku Handa =

Japanese footballer (born 2002)

Riku Handa 半田 陸
Personal information
- Full name: Riku Handa
- Date of birth: 1 January 2002 (age 24)
- Place of birth: Yamagata, Japan
- Height: 1.76 m (5 ft 9 in)
- Position: Right-back

Team information
- Current team: Gamba Osaka
- Number: 3

Youth career
- 2014–2019: Montedio Yamagata

Senior career*
Years	Team	Apps	(Gls)
2019–2022	Montedio Yamagata	94	(3)
2023–	Gamba Osaka	95	(3)

International career^{‡}
2018	Japan U16		
2019	Japan U19	3	(0)
2022–	Japan U23	6	(0)
Medal record
Representing Japan
AFC U-16 Championship
Gold medal – first place	2018 Malaysia
AFC U-23 Asian Cup
Bronze medal – third place	2022 Uzbekistan	Team
Gold medal – first place	2024 Qatar	Team
- * Club domestic league appearances and goals as of 9 August 2026 ‡ National team caps and goals as of 18 June 2022

Riku Handa (半田 陸, Handa Riku; born 1 January 2002) is a Japanese professional footballer who plays as a right-back for J1 League club Gamba Osaka.

== Club career ==
Handa started his career with Montedio Yamagata Youth and was given his first professional contract for Montedio Yamagata in March 2019. He made his first-team debut in May 2019, coming on as a late substitute for Kai Miki in a J2 League game against JEF United Chiba. In July of the same year, he made his first start for the club in the second round of the Emperor's Cup in a 2–1 defeat to Tochigi SC. Handa went on to play six times in his debut season.

In the 2020 season, Handa played 15 times for Montedio Yamagata but 2021 was his breakthrough year – playing in 37 games and being in the starting XI on 36 occasions. He also scored his first goal for the club in a 3–1 defeat to V-Varen Nagasaki and went on to score three goals during the rest of the season. In the 2022 season, Handa was again a key member of the starting XI, playing more than 3000 minutes over 37 games. He made a total of 95 appearances in four seasons with Yamagata.

In January 2023, Handa signed for J1 League club Gamba Osaka.

== International career ==
In March 2023, Handa was called up to the Japan national team for the first time by manager Hajime Moriyasu to play in the 2023 Kirin Challenge Cup.

On 4 April 2024, Handa was called up to the Japan U23 squad for the 2024 AFC U-23 Asian Cup.

== Career statistics ==
=== Club ===
As of end of 2024 season

Appearances and goals by club, season and competition
Club	Season	League			Emperor's Cup		J.League Cup		Total	
Club	Season	Division	Apps	Goals	Apps	Goals	Apps	Goals	Apps	Goals
Montedio Yamagata	2019	J2 League	5	0	1	0	–		6	0
Montedio Yamagata	2020	J2 League	15	0	0	0	–		15	0
Montedio Yamagata	2021	J2 League	37	3	0	0	–		37	3
Montedio Yamagata	2022	J2 League	37	0	0	0	–		37	0
Montedio Yamagata	Total		94	3	1	0	0	0	95	3
Gamba Osaka	2023	J1 League	23	1	0	0	4	1	27	2
Gamba Osaka	2024	J1 League	24	1	3	0	0	0	27	1
Gamba Osaka	Total		47	2	3	0	4	1	54	3
Career total			141	5	4	0	4	1	149	6

== Honours ==
Japan U16

- AFC U-16 Championship: 2018

Japan U23

- AFC U-23 Asian Cup: 2024
