= Ryoya Yamashita =

Japanese footballer

Ryoya Yamashita 山下 諒也
Personal information
- Date of birth: 19 October 1997 (age 29)
- Place of birth: Shizuoka, Japan
- Height: 1.64 m (5 ft 5 in)
- Position: Forward

Team information
- Current team: Gamba Osaka
- Number: 17

Youth career
- –2014: Júbilo Iwata

College career
Years	Team	Apps	(Gls)
2016–2019	Nippon Sport Science University		

Senior career*
Years	Team	Apps	(Gls)
2020–2021	Tokyo Verdy	79	(15)
2022–2023	Yokohama FC	69	(5)
2024–	Gamba Osaka	83	(9)
- * Club domestic league appearances and goals as of 9 August 2026

Ryoya Yamashita (山下 諒也, Yamashita Ryoya; born 19 October 1997) is a Japanese footballer currently playing as a forward for J1 League club Gamba Osaka.

== Career ==
On 14 February 2020, Yamashita was announced at Tokyo Verdy.

On 29 December 2021, Yamashita was announced at Yokohama FC.

On 26 December 2023, Yamashita was announced at Gamba Osaka.

== Career statistics ==
=== Club ===
As of 24 April 2024

Appearances and goals by club, season and competition
Club	Season	League			National Cup		League Cup		Other		Total	
Club	Season	Division	Apps	Goals	Apps	Goals	Apps	Goals	Apps	Goals	Apps	Goals
Japan			League		Emperor's Cup		J. League Cup		Other		Total	
Tokyo Verdy	2020	J2 League	41	8	0	0	–		–		41	8
Tokyo Verdy	2021	J2 League	38	7	1	0	–		–		39	7
Tokyo Verdy	Total		79	15	1	0	0	0	0	0	80	15
Yokohama FC	2022	J2 League	41	3	1	0	–		–		42	3
Yokohama FC	2023	J1 League	28	2	0	0	3	2	–		31	4
Yokohama FC	Total		69	5	1	0	3	2	0	0	73	7
Gamba Osaka	2024	J1 League	1	0	0	0	0	0	0	0	1	0
Career total			149	20	2	0	3	2	0	0	154	22

== Honours ==
Gamba Osaka

- AFC Champions League Two: 2025–26
