= Shota Fukuoka =

Japanese footballer

Shota Fukuoka 福岡 将太
Personal information
- Full name: Shota Fukuoka
- Date of birth: October 24, 1995 (age 31)
- Place of birth: Nishitōkyō, Tokyo, Japan
- Height: 1.80 m (5 ft 11 in)
- Position: Centre back

Team information
- Current team: Gamba Osaka
- Number: 2

Youth career
- 2011–2013: Jissen Gakuen High School

Senior career*
Years	Team	Apps	(Gls)
2014–2016	Shonan Bellmare	0	(0)
2014	→ J. League U-22 (loan)	2	(0)
2015–2016	→ Fukushima United FC (loan)	26	(1)
2017–2018	Tochigi SC	51	(2)
2019–2021	Tokushima Vortis	59	(0)
2022–	Gamba Osaka	108	(3)
- * Club domestic league appearances and goals as of 9 August 2026

Shota Fukuoka (福岡 将太, Fukuoka Shota; born October 24, 1995 in Tokyo) is a Japanese professional footballer who plays as a centre back for J1 League club Gamba Osaka.

== Career ==
On 12 September 2013, Fukuoka joined Shonan Bellmare from the 2014 season.

On 20 March 2014, Fukuoka joined the J.League U-22 Selection temporarily.

He moved on a one year loan to Fukushima United FC on 24 December 2014.

On 23 December 2018, Fukuoka was announced at Tokushima Vortis.

On 5 January 2022, Fukuoka joined Gamba Osaka.

== Career statistics ==
As of 13 September 2023

Appearances and goals by club, season and competition
Club	Season	League			National cup		League cup		Total	
Club	Season	Division	Apps	Goals	Apps	Goals	Apps	Goals	Apps	Goals
Japan			League		Emperor's Cup		J. League Cup		Total	
Shonan Bellmare	2014	J2 League	0	0	0	0	–		0	0
J.League U-22 Selection (loan)	2014	J3 League	2	0	0	0	–		2	0
Fukushima United (loan)	2015	J3 League	12	0	1	0	–		13	0
Fukushima United (loan)	2016	J3 League	14	1	0	0	–		14	1
Fukushima United (loan)	Total		26	1	1	0	0	0	27	1
Tochigi SC	2017	J3 League	20	0	0	0	–		20	0
Tochigi SC	2018	J2 League	31	2	1	0	–		32	2
Tochigi SC	Total		51	2	1	0	0	0	52	2
Tokushima Vortis	2019	J2 League	3	0	1	0	–		4	0
Tokushima Vortis	2020	J2 League	27	0	2	0	–		29	0
Tokushima Vortis	2021	J1 League	29	0	1	0	1	0	31	0
Tokushima Vortis	Total		59	0	4	0	1	0	64	0
Gamba Osaka	2022	J1 League	11	0	3	0	3	0	17	0
Gamba Osaka	2023	J1 League	18	0	0	0	8	0	26	0
Gamba Osaka	Total		29	0	3	0	11	0	43	0
Career total			167	3	9	0	12	0	188	3
