= Yusei Egawa =

Japanese footballer (born 2000)

Personal information
- Full name: Yusei Egawa
- Date of birth: 24 October 2000 (age 26)
- Place of birth: Minamishimabara, Nagasaki, Japan
- Height: 1.75 m (5 ft 9 in)
- Position: Defender

Team information
- Current team: V-Varen Nagasaki
- Number: 6

Youth career
- Fukae FC
- FCK Marry Gold Kumamoto
- V-Varen Nagasaki

Senior career*
Years	Team	Apps	(Gls)
2019–2022	V-Varen Nagasaki	79	(3)
2023–2025	Gamba Osaka	17	(0)
2025–	V-Varen Nagasaki	30	(1)
- * Club domestic league appearances and goals as of 11 August 2026

Yusei Egawa (江川 湧清, Egawa Yusei; born 24 October 2000) is a Japanese footballer who plays as a defender for J2 League club V-Varen Nagasaki.

== Career ==
On 28 December 2022, Egawa was announced at Gamba Osaka.

== Career statistics ==
=== Club ===
As of 22 September 2023.

Appearances and goals by club, season and competition
Club	Season	League			National Cup		League Cup		Other		Total	
Club	Season	Division	Apps	Goals	Apps	Goals	Apps	Goals	Apps	Goals	Apps	Goals
V-Varen Nagasaki	2020	J2 League	11	0	0	0	–		0	0	11	0
V-Varen Nagasaki	2021	J2 League	32	2	1	0	–		0	0	33	2
V-Varen Nagasaki	2022	J2 League	36	1	2	0	–		0	0	38	1
Total		79	3	3	0	0	0	0	0	82	3	
Gamba Osaka	2023	J1 League	9	0	0	0	4	0	0	0	13	0
Career total			88	3	3	0	4	0	0	0	95	3
