= Kyohei Yoshino =

Japanese footballer (born 1994)

Kyohei Yoshino 吉野 恭平
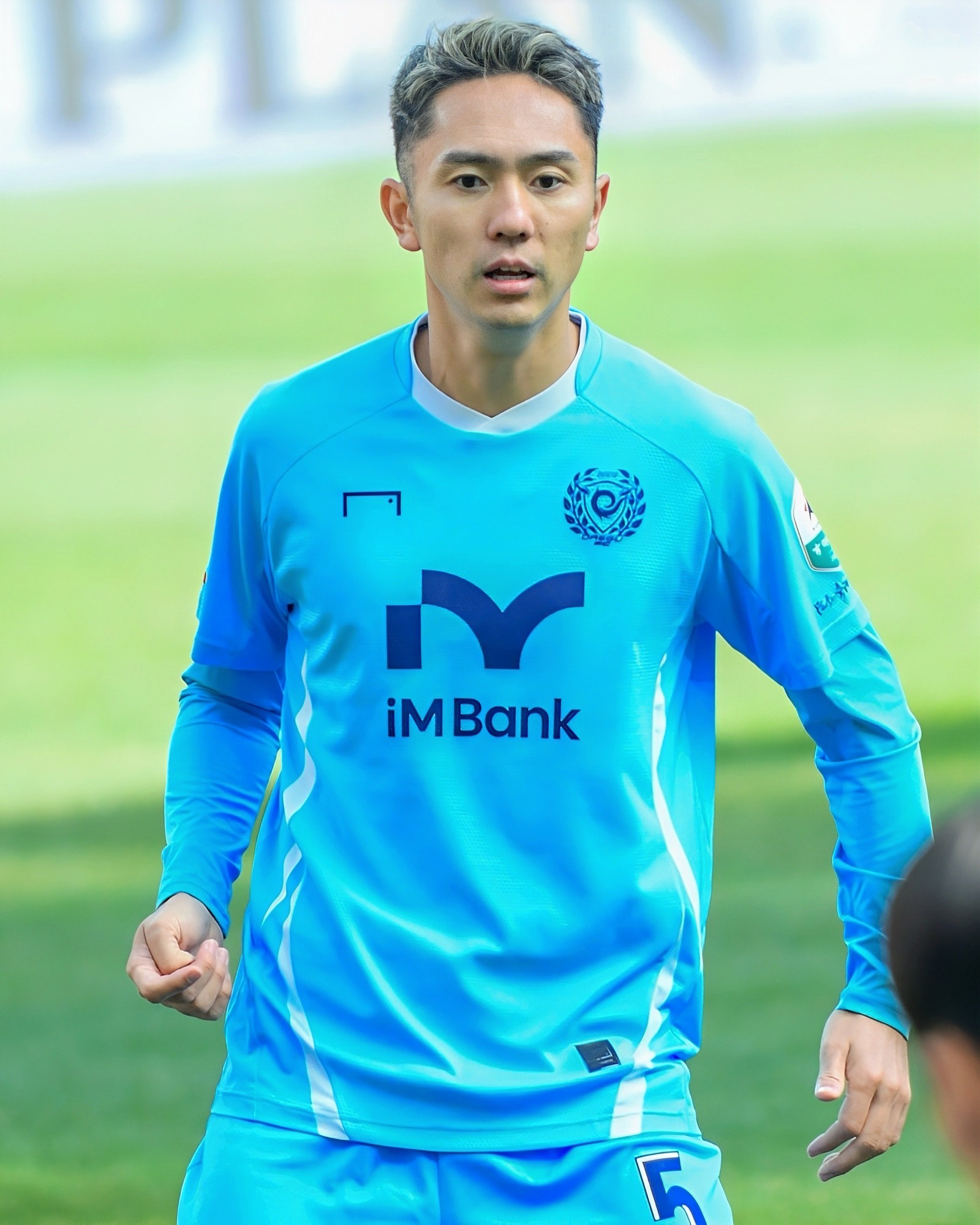
- Yoshino with Daegu FC in 2025

Personal information
- Full name: Kyohei Yoshino
- Date of birth: 8 November 1994 (age 32)
- Place of birth: Sendai, Miyagi, Japan
- Height: 1.82 m (5 ft 11 1/2 in)
- Positions: Centre back; midfielder

Team information
- Current team: Persija Jakarta
- Number: 44

Youth career
- 2010–2012: Tokyo Verdy

Senior career*
Years	Team	Apps	(Gls)
2013–2014	Tokyo Verdy	9	(0)
2014–2019	Sanfrecce Hiroshima	36	(0)
2014	→ Tokyo Verdy (loan)	14	(1)
2014	→ J. League U-22 (loan)	5	(0)
2016–2017	→ Kyoto Sanga (loan)	47	(1)
2020–2022	Vegalta Sendai	68	(4)
2023	Yokohama FC	24	(1)
2024–2025	Daegu FC	48	(7)
2025–2026	Cerezo Osaka	15	(0)
2026–	Persija Jakarta	7	(0)
- * Club domestic league appearances and goals as of 22:00, 22 October 2026 (UTC)

Kyohei Yoshino (吉野 恭平, Yoshino Kyohei; born 8 November 1994 in Miyagi) is a Japanese footballer who plays as a centre back or midfielder for Super League club Persija Jakarta.

== Club career ==
Kyohei Yoshino joined to Tokyo Verdy in 2013.

In August 2014, he moved to Sanfrecce Hiroshima.

In July 2016, he moved to Kyoto Sanga FC.

In 2020, he returned to his hometown club Vegalta Sendai.

In 2022, he joined to J1 promotion club, Yokohama FC for upcoming 2023 season.

In January 2024, he signed for K League 1 club, Daegu FC

== Career statistics ==
As of 23 March 2026.

=== Club ===
Appearances and goals by club, season and competition
Club	Season	League			National cup (Note: Includes Emperors Cup)		League cup (Note: Includes J.League Cup)		Continental		Other		Total	
Club	Season	Division	Apps	Goals	Apps	Goals	Apps	Goals	Apps	Goals	Apps	Goals	Apps	Goals
Tokyo Verdy	2012	J.League Division 2	0	0	0	0	–		–		–		0	0
Tokyo Verdy	2013	J.League Division 2	9	0	1	0	–		–		–		10	0
Tokyo Verdy	Total		9	0	1	0	0	0	0	0	0	0	10	0
Sanfrecce Hiroshima	2014	J.League Division 1	0	0	0	0	0	0	0	0	–		0	0
Sanfrecce Hiroshima	2015	J1 League	0	0	2	0	2	0	0	0	–		4	0
Sanfrecce Hiroshima	2016	J1 League	2	0	0	0	0	0	1 (Note: Appearances in AFC Champions League Elite)	0	–		3	0
Sanfrecce Hiroshima	2018	J1 League	18	0	3	0	6	0	0	0	–		27	0
Sanfrecce Hiroshima	2019	J1 League	16	0	1	0	0	0	6	0	–		23	0
Sanfrecce Hiroshima	Total		36	0	6	0	8	0	7	0	0	0	57	0
J.League U-22 Selection (loan)	2014	J3 League	5	0	–		–		–		–		5	0
Tokyo Verdy (loan)	2014	J.League Division 2	14	1	1	0	–		–		–		15	1
Kyoto Sanga (loan)	2016	J2 League	13	0	2	0	–		–		1 (Note: Appearance in J1/J2 play-offs)	0	16	0
Kyoto Sanga (loan)	2017	J2 League	34	1	1	0	–		–		0	0	35	1
Kyoto Sanga (loan)	Total		47	1	3	0	0	0	0	0	1	0	51	1
Vegalta Sendai	2020	J1 League	14	0	0	0	1	0	–		–		15	0
Vegalta Sendai	2021	J1 League	31	2	0	0	2	0	–		–		33	2
Vegalta Sendai	2022	J2 League	23	2	1	0	0	0	–		–		24	2
Vegalta Sendai	Total		68	4	1	0	3	0	0	0	0	0	72	4
Yokohama FC	2023	J1 League	24	1	–		3	0	–		–		27	1
Daegu FC	2024	K League 1	32	5	0	0	–		–		–		32	5
Daegu FC	2025	K League 1	16	2	0	0	–		–		–		16	2
Daegu FC	Total		48	7	0	0	0	0	0	0	0	0	48	7
Cerezo Osaka	2025	J1 League	11	0	2	0	1	0	–		–		14	0
Cerezo Osaka	2026	J1 (100)	1	0	0	0	0	0	–		–		1	0
Cerezo Osaka	Total		12	0	2	0	1	0	0	0	0	0	15	0
Career total			263	14	14	0	15	0	7	0	1	0	300	14

== Honours ==
Sanfrecce Hiroshima

- J1 League: 2015
