= Boniface Nduka =

Japanese footballer (born 1996)

Boniface Nduka ンドカ・ボニフェイス
Personal information
- Full name: Boniface Nduka
- Date of birth: 15 February 1996 (age 30)
- Place of birth: Koshigaya, Saitama, Japan
- Height: 1.83 m (6 ft 0 in)
- Position: Defender

Team information
- Current team: JEF United Chiba (on loan from Vissel Kobe)
- Number: 2

Youth career
- –2007: Koshigaya SSS
- 2008–2010: Omiya Ardija
- 2011–2013: Urawa Higashi High School

College career
Years	Team	Apps	(Gls)
2014–2017	Nippon Sport Science University		

Senior career*
Years	Team	Apps	(Gls)
2018–2021	Mito HollyHock	60	(5)
2021–2022	Tokyo Verdy	66	(5)
2023–2025	Yokohama FC	99	(6)
2026–	Vissel Kobe	10	(1)
2026–	→ JEF United Chiba (loan)	1	(0)
- * Club domestic league appearances and goals as of 17:33, 12 October 2026 (UTC)

Boniface Nduka (ンドカ・ボニフェイス, Ndoka Bonifeisu; born 15 February 1996) is a Japanese footballer who plays as a defender for J1 League club JEF United Chiba, on loan from Vissel Kobe.

== Career ==
Boniface started his career at J2 club Mito HollyHock in December 2017 after graduation at high school and university.

On 26 December 2020, Nduka joined Tokyo Verdy of the J2.

On 6 December 2022, Nduka officially transferred to newly promoted J1 club, Yokohama FC.

On 4 January 2026, Nduka transferred to Vissel Kobe of the J1 on a permanent transfer.

In September 2026, Nduka moved on loan to fellow J1 League club JEF United Chiba.

== Personal life ==
Nduka was born in Koshigaya, Saitama, Japan. His mother is Japanese and his father comes from Nigeria. His younger brother, Charles Nduka, currently plays for Melbourne Victory of the Australian A-League.

== Career statistics ==
=== Club ===
As of the start of 2023 season.

Appearances and goals by club, season and competition
Club	Season	League			National cup (Note: Includes Emperor's Cup)		League cup (Note: Includes J.League Cup)		Continental		Total	
Club	Season	Division	Apps	Goals	Apps	Goals	Apps	Goals	Apps	Goals	Apps	Goals
Mito HollyHock	2018	J2 League	5	0	2	0	–		–		7	0
Mito HollyHock	2019	J2 League	18	1	1	0	–		–		19	1
Mito HollyHock	2020	J2 League	37	4	0	0	–		–		37	4
Mito HollyHock	Total		60	5	3	0	0	0	0	0	63	5
Tokyo Verdy	2021	J2 League	34	2	1	0	–		–		35	2
Tokyo Verdy	2022	J2 League	32	3	2	1	–		–		34	4
Tokyo Verdy	Total		66	5	3	1	0	0	0	0	69	6
Yokohama FC	2023	J1 League	26	2	1	0	0	0	–		27	2
Yokohama FC	2024	J2 League	36	2	2	0	2	0	–		40	2
Yokohama FC	2025	J1 League	37	2	0	0	4	0	–		41	2
Yokohama FC	Total		99	6	3	0	6	0	0	0	108	6
Vissel Kobe	2025–26	–			–		–		2 (Note: Appearances in AFC Champions League Elite)	0	2	0
Vissel Kobe	2026	J1 (100)	9	1	–		–		0	0	9	1
Vissel Kobe	2026–27	J1 League	1	0	0	0	–		0	0	1	0
Vissel Kobe	Total		10	1	0	0	0	0	2	0	12	1
JEF United Chiba (loan)	2026–27	J1 League	1	0	1	0	1	0	–		3	0
Career total			236	17	10	1	7	0	2	0	255	18

== Honours ==
=== Vissel Kobe ===
- J1 100 Year Vision League: 2026

=== Individual ===
- J2 League Best XI: 2024
