= Kazuma Takai =

Japanese footballer

Kazuma Takai 高井 和馬
Personal information
- Full name: Kazuma Takai
- Date of birth: 5 August 1994 (age 32)
- Place of birth: Chiba, Japan
- Height: 1.78 m (5 ft 10 in)
- Position: Attacking midfielder

Team information
- Current team: SC Sagamihara
- Number: 80

Youth career
- Tsukushi SC
- Ichikawa Kanezuka SC
- Teikyo Nagaoka High School
- –2012: Chiba SC

College career
| Years | Team | Apps | (Gls) |
| 2013–2016 | Nippon Sport Science University | | |

Senior career*
| Years | Team | Apps | (Gls) |
| 2017 | Thespakusatsu Gunma | 39 | (10) |
| 2018 | Tokyo Verdy | 3 | (0) |
| 2018–2021 | Renofa Yamaguchi | 134 | (27) |
| 2022 | Mito HollyHock | 18 | (3) |
| 2022 | Renofa Yamaguchi | 16 | (7) |
| 2023 | Yokohama FC | 9 | (1) |
| 2024 | Matsumoto Yamaga | 6 | (1) |
| 2025– | SC Sagamihara | 10 | (1) |
- * Club domestic league appearances and goals as of 17 January 2026

Kazuma Takai (高井 和馬, Takai Kazuma; born August 5, 1994) is a Japanese football player who play as an offensive midfielder and currently play for J3 League club, SC Sagamihara.

== Career ==
After inheriting no. 26 in Gunma due to Yusuke Segawa leaving for Omiya Ardija, Takai joined Thespakusatsu Gunma and debuted in February 2017 in J2 League, scoring his first pro-goal just one week later against Shonan Bellmare.

On 7 December 2022, Takai joined to J1 newly promoted club, Yokohama FC for upcoming 2023 season.

On 5 January 2024, Takai announcement officially transfer to J3 club, Matsumoto Yamaga for 2024 season. On 9 December at same year, Takai leave from this club after one year at Matsumoto Yamaga.

On 5 January 2025, Takai announce official transfer to fellow J3 club, SC Sagamihara for 2025 season.

== Career statistics ==
=== Club ===
As of the start for 2025 season.

| Club performance | | | League | | Cup | | League Cup | | Total | |
| Season | Club | League | Apps | Goals | Apps | Goals | Apps | Goals | Apps | Goals |
| Japan | | | League | | Emperor's Cup | | J. League Cup | | Total | |
|---|---|---|---|---|---|---|---|---|---|---|
| 2017 | Thespakusatsu Gunma | J2 League | 39 | 10 | 2 | 0 | - | | 41 | 10 |
| 2018 | Tokyo Verdy | J2 League | 3 | 0 | 1 | 0 | - | | 4 | 0 |
| 2018 | Renofa Yamaguchi | J2 League | 18 | 2 | 0 | 0 | - | | 18 | 2 |
| 2019 | Renofa Yamaguchi | J2 League | 38 | 8 | 0 | 0 | - | | 38 | 8 |
| 2020 | Renofa Yamaguchi | J2 League | 42 | 11 | 0 | 0 | - | | 42 | 11 |
| 2021 | Renofa Yamaguchi | J2 League | 38 | 6 | 0 | 0 | - | | 38 | 6 |
| 2022 | Mito HollyHock | J2 League | 18 | 3 | 1 | 1 | - | | 19 | 4 |
| 2022 | Renofa Yamaguchi | J2 League | 16 | 7 | 0 | 0 | - | | 16 | 7 |
| 2023 | Yokohama FC | J1 League | 9 | 1 | 2 | 0 | 3 | 0 | 14 | 1 |
| 2024 | Matsumoto Yamaga | J3 League | 6 | 1 | 0 | 0 | 0 | 0 | 6 | 1 |
| 2025 | SC Sagamihara | J3 League | 0 | 0 | 0 | 0 | 0 | 0 | 0 | 0 |
| Total | | | 227 | 49 | 6 | 1 | 3 | 0 | 236 | 50 |
