= Issei Ouchi =

Japanese footballer

Issei Ouchi 大内 一生
Personal information
- Date of birth: 8 September 2000 (age 26)
- Place of birth: Italy
- Height: 1.86 m (6 ft 1 in)
- Position: Goalkeeper

Team information
- Current team: Sanfrecce Hiroshima
- Number: 99

Youth career
- 2010–2012: Kinder Yoshimitsu SC
- 2013–2018: Yokohama FC

Senior career*
| Years | Team | Apps | (Gls) |
| 2019–2023 | Yokohama FC | 0 | (0) |
| 2020 | → YSCC Yokohama (loan) | 22 | (0) |
| 2022 | → AC Nagano Parceiro (loan) | 27 | (0) |
| 2023–2024 | → Kagoshima United FC (loan) | 6 | (0) |
| 2024–2025 | Matsumoto Yamaga | 68 | (0) |
| 2026– | Sanfrecce Hiroshima | 5 | (0) |

International career^{‡}
| 2015 | Japan U15 | 3 | (0) |
- * Club domestic league appearances and goals as of 9 August 2026 ‡ National team caps and goals as of 17:04, 27 June 2020 (UTC)

Issei Ouchi (大内 一生, Ouchi Issei; born 8 September 2000) is a professional footballer currently playing as a goalkeeper for J1 League club Sanfrecce Hiroshima. Born in Italy, Ouchi has represented Japan at youth international level.

== Career statistics ==
=== Club ===
As of 2 April 2026.

Appearances and goals by club, season and competition
| Club | Season | League | | | League cup (Note: Includes J.League Cup) | | Other | | Total | |
| Club | Season | Division | Apps | Goals | Apps | Goals | Apps | Goals | Apps | Goals |
|---|---|---|---|---|---|---|---|---|---|---|
| Yokohama FC | 2017 | J2 League | 0 | 0 | 0 | 0 | – | | 0 | 0 |
| Yokohama FC | 2018 | J2 League | 0 | 0 | 0 | 0 | – | | 0 | 0 |
| Yokohama FC | 2019 | J2 League | 0 | 0 | 0 | 0 | – | | 0 | 0 |
| Yokohama FC | 2021 | J1 League | 0 | 0 | 0 | 0 | – | | 0 | 0 |
| Yokohama FC | Total | | 0 | 0 | 0 | 0 | 0 | 0 | 0 | 0 |
| YSCC Yokohama (loan) | 2020 | J3 League | 29 | 0 | – | | – | | 29 | 0 |
| AC Nagano Parceiro (loan) | 2022 | J3 League | 27 | 0 | – | | – | | 27 | 0 |
| Kagoshima United (loan) | 2023 | J3 League | 6 | 0 | – | | – | | 6 | 0 |
| Matsumoto Yamaga | 2024 | J3 League | 30 | 0 | 2 | 0 | 2 (Note: Appearance in J2/J3 play-offs) | 0 | 34 | 0 |
| Matsumoto Yamaga | 2025 | J3 League | 38 | 0 | 2 | 0 | 0 | 0 | 40 | 0 |
| Matsumoto Yamaga | Total | | 68 | 0 | 4 | 0 | 2 | 0 | 74 | 0 |
| Sanfrecce Hiroshima | 2026 | J1 (100) | 1 | 0 | – | | – | | 1 | 0 |
| Career total | | | 131 | 0 | 4 | 0 | 2 | 0 | 137 | 0 |
