= Kento Hashimoto (footballer, born 1999) =

Japanese footballer

Kento Hashimoto 橋本 健人
Personal information
- Date of birth: 8 December 1999 (age 26)
- Place of birth: Kanagawa, Japan
- Height: 1.72 m (5 ft 8 in)
- Position: Defender

Team information
- Current team: FC Tokyo
- Number: 42

Youth career
- Yokohama Kohoku SC
- –2017: Yokohama FC

College career
Years	Team	Apps	(Gls)
2018–2021	Keio University		

Senior career*
Years	Team	Apps	(Gls)
2020–2023	Renofa Yamaguchi	53	(3)
2023	→ Yokohama FC (loan)	7	(0)
2024	Tokushima Vortis	21	(1)
2024–2025	Albirex Niigata	36	(0)
2026–	FC Tokyo	9	(0)
- * Club domestic league appearances and goals as of 14:33, 9 April 2026 (UTC)

Kento Hashimoto (橋本 健人, Hashimoto Kento; born 8 December 1999) is a Japanese footballer currently playing as a left-back for J1 League club FC Tokyo.

== Career ==
On 28 May 2020, Renofa announced Hashimoto would join the team in the 2022 season. He was officially approved as a specially designated player on 12 June 2020. On 17 February 2021, Renofa applied Hashimoto to be a specially designated player for the 2021 season.

On 26 December 2022, Hashimoto was announced at Yokohama FC on a loan deal.

On 27 December 2023, Hashimoto was announced at Tokushima Vortis.

On 30 July 2024, Hashimoto was announced at Albirex Niigata.

Following the relegation of Albirex Niigata, in December 2025 he joined J1 League club FC Tokyo.

== Career statistics ==
=== Club ===
As of 9 April 2026.

Appearances and goals by club, season and competition
Club	Season	League			National cup (Note: Includes Emperors Cup)		League cup (Note: Includes J.League Cup)		Total	
Club	Season	Division	Apps	Goals	Apps	Goals	Apps	Goals	Apps	Goals
Renofa Yamaguchi	2020	J2 League	10	0	0	0	–		10	0
Renofa Yamaguchi	2021	J2 League	8	1	0	0	–		8	1
Renofa Yamaguchi	2022	J2 League	35	2	1	0	–		36	2
Renofa Yamaguchi	Total		53	3	1	0	0	0	54	3
Yokohama FC (loan)	2023	J1 League	7	0	2	0	3	0	12	0
Tokushima Vortis	2024	J2 League	21	1	2	0	1	0	24	1
Albirex Niigata	2024	J1 League	9	0	0	0	4	0	13	0
Albirex Niigata	2025	J1 League	27	0	1	1	3	0	31	1
Albirex Niigata	Total		36	0	1	1	7	0	44	1
FC Tokyo	2026	J1 (100)	9	0	–		–		9	0
Career total			126	4	6	1	11	0	143	5
