= Mizuki Arai =

Japanese footballer

Mizuki Arai 新井 瑞希
Personal information
- Full name: Mizuki Arai
- Date of birth: 14 April 1997 (age 29)
- Place of birth: Kita-Adachi, Saitama, Japan
- Height: 1.70 m (5 ft 7 in)
- Position: Winger

Team information
- Current team: Mito HollyHock
- Number: 14

Youth career
- 2010–2012: Kashiwa Reysol
- 2013–2015: Urawa Red Diamonds

Senior career*
Years	Team	Apps	(Gls)
2016–2017	SV Horn	13	(1)
2017	SC Sagamihara	11	(2)
2018–2019	Kataller Toyama	33	(2)
2019	→ Tokyo Verdy (loan)	8	(1)
2020–2022	Tokyo Verdy	53	(7)
2022	→ Gil Vicente (loan)	8	(0)
2023–2025	Yokohama FC	18	(0)
2023	→ Vissel Kobe (loan)	4	(0)
2025–	Mito HollyHock	21	(0)
- * Club domestic league appearances and goals as of 12 August 2026

Mizuki Arai (新井 瑞希, Arai Mizuki; born 14 April 1997) is a Japanese footballer who plays as a winger for Mito HollyHock.

== Career ==
=== SV Horn ===
On 30 January 2016, Arai was announced at SV Horn. made his debut against Austria Lustenau on 29 July 2016. JArai scored his first goal for Horn against Austria Lustenau on 2 December 2016, scoring in the 90th minute.

=== Sagamihara ===
After being a part of SV Horn for two years, Arai opted to come back to Japan, signing with SC Sagamihara in September 2017.

=== Kataller Toyama ===
Arai made his debut against Fujieda MYFC on 17 March 2018. He scored his first goal for the club against Gamba Osaka U-23 on 8 April 2018, scoring in the 37th minute.

=== Loan to Tokyo Verdy ===
On 15 August 2019, Arai was announced at Tokyo Verdy on a loan contract. He scored on his debut against V-Varen Nagasaki on 31 August 2019, scoring in the 6th minute.

=== Tokyo Verdy ===
On 6 January 2020, Arai joined Tokyo Verdy on a permanent deal.

=== Gil Vicente ===
On 29 July 2022, Arai was announced at Gil Vicente on a loan deal. He made his debut for Gil Vicente against Paços de Ferreira on 8th of August 2022.

=== Yokohama FC ===
On 26 December 2022, Arai was announced at Yokohama FC. He made his debut for Yokohama against Avispa Fukuoka on 1 April 2023. On 7 January 2024, Arai's contract with the club was extended for the 2024 season.

=== Loan to Vissel Kobe ===
On 16 August 2023, Arai signed for Vissel Kobe on a loan deal. He made his debut for Vissel against Kashiwa Reysol on 19 August 2023. On 7 January 2024, it was announced that his loan contract would expire at the end of the 2023 season.

== Club statistics ==
Updated to 1 January 2020.

Club performance			League		Cup		Total	
Season	Club	League	Apps	Goals	Apps	Goals	Apps	Goals
Japan			League		Emperor's Cup		Total	
2015–16	SV Horn	Regionalliga	0	0	–		0	0
2016–17	SV Horn	First League	13	1	1	0	14	1
Japan			League		Emperor's Cup		Total	
2017	SC Sagamihara	J3 League	11	2	0	0	11	2
2018	Kataller Toyama	J3 League	27	2	1	0	28	2
2019	Kataller Toyama	J3 League	6	0	2	0	8	0
2019	Tokyo Verdy	J2 League	8	1	–		8	1
Total			65	6	4	0	69	6
