= Naohiro Sugiyama =

Japanese footballer

Naohiro Sugiyama 杉山 直宏
Personal information
- Date of birth: 7 September 1998 (age 28)
- Place of birth: Kitakyushu, Fukuoka, Japan
- Height: 1.75 m (5 ft 9 in)
- Position: Midfielder

Team information
- Current team: JEF United Chiba
- Number: 18

Youth career
- 2014–2016: Ohzu High School

College career
Years	Team	Apps	(Gls)
2017–2020	Juntendo University		

Senior career*
Years	Team	Apps	(Gls)
2021–2023	Roasso Kumamoto	70	(14)
2023–2024	Gamba Osaka	8	(0)
2024	→ Montedio Yamagata (loan)	14	(1)
2024	→ JEF United Chiba (loan)	13	(0)
2025–	JEF United Chiba	35	(2)
- * Club domestic league appearances and goals as of 12 August 2026

Naohiro Sugiyama (杉山 直宏, Sugiyama Naohiro; born 7 September 1998) is a Japanese footballer who plays as a midfielder for J1 League club JEF United Chiba.

== Career ==
=== Roasso Kumamoto ===
Starting his professional career at Roasso Kumamoto in the J3 League, Sugiyama helped the team to promotion in his debut season, scoring 5 goals in 30 appearances across all competitions. He made his debut in a league victory against FC Imabari and scored his first goal for the club two months later in a league win over Nagano Parceiro. In his second season with the club, he scored 9 goals from 42 appearances in the J2 League and almost helped them gain back-to-back promotions. Roasso were defeated in the J1/J2 play-off final by Kyoto Sanga.

=== Gamba Osaka ===
In December 2022, it was announced that Sugiyama would be joining J1 League club Gamba Osaka for the 2023 season. He made his debut on the first league game of the season, in a 2–2 draw with Kashiwa Reysol.

=== Loan to Montedio Yamagata ===
In December 2023, it was announced that Sugiyama would be moving on loan to J2 League club Montedio Yamagata for the 2024 season.

== Career statistics ==
=== Club ===
As of 25 April 2024.

Appearances and goals by club, season and competition
Club	Season	League			Emperor's Cup		J. League Cup		Other		Total	
Club	Season	Division	Apps	Goals	Apps	Goals	Apps	Goals	Apps	Goals	Apps	Goals
Roasso Kumamoto	2021	J3 League	28	5	2	0	–		–		30	5
Roasso Kumamoto	2022	J2 League	42	9	2	0	–		3 (Note: Appearances in the J1/J2 play-offs)	1	47	10
Roasso Kumamoto	Total		70	14	4	0	0	0	3	1	77	15
Gamba Osaka	2023	J1 League	8	0	1	0	5	2	0	0	14	2
Montedio Yamagata (loan)	2024	J2 League	9	1	0	0	1	0	0	0	10	1
Career total			87	15	5	0	6	2	3	1	101	18
