= Koki Sakamoto (footballer) =

Japanese footballer

Koki Sakamoto 坂本 亘基
Personal information
- Full name: Koki Sakamoto
- Date of birth: 19 January 1999 (age 27)
- Place of birth: Kumamoto, Japan
- Height: 1.66 m (5 ft 5 in)
- Position: Midfielder

Team information
- Current team: Sagan Tosu
- Number: 7

Youth career
- Azzurino Kumamoto
- Sorriso Kumamoto
- –2016: Roasso Kumamoto

College career
Years	Team	Apps	(Gls)
2017–2020	Meiji University		

Senior career*
Years	Team	Apps	(Gls)
2021–2023	Roasso Kumamoto	52	(7)
2023	Yokohama FC	25	(0)
2024–2025	Montedio Yamagata	62	(7)
2026–	Sagan Tosu	19	(2)
- * Club domestic league appearances and goals as of 14 August 2026

Koki Sakamoto (坂本 亘基, Sakamoto Koki; born 19 January 1999) is a Japanese footballer who plays as a midfielder for J2 League club Sagan Tosu.

== Early life ==
Koki was born in Kumamoto. He played for the youth teams Azzurino Kumamoto, Sorriso Kumamoto, and Roasso Kumamoto. He studied at Meiji University.

== Career ==
Koki joined Roasso in 2021. He made his debut for them in a 2–1 win against Kamatamare Sanuki, coming on in the 70th minute for Thales Paula. He scored his first goal for the club against Fujieda MYFC, scoring a goal in the 70th minute from the bench. He finished the season with 12 appearances.

Koki joined Yokohama in 2023. He made his debut for them in a 1–0 loss to Nagoya Grampus on 18 February 2023.

== Career statistics ==
=== Club ===
As of 27 March 2026.

Appearances and goals by club, season and competition
Club	Season	League			National cup (Note: Includes Emperors Cup)		League cup (Note: Includes J.League Cup)		Other		Total	
Club	Season	Division	Apps	Goals	Apps	Goals	Apps	Goals	Apps	Goals	Apps	Goals
Meiji University	2019	–			1	0	–		–		1	0
Roasso Kumamoto	2021	J3 League	12	2	0	0	–		0	0	12	2
Roasso Kumamoto	2022	J2 League	40	5	2	1	–		3 (Note: Appearance in J1/J2 play-offs)	1	45	7
Roasso Kumamoto	Total		52	7	2	1	0	0	3	1	57	9
Yokohama FC	2023	J1 League	25	0	1	0	3	0	–		29	0
Montedio Yamagata	2024	J2 League	31	4	2	0	0	0	1	0	34	4
Montedio Yamagata	2025	J2 League	31	3	3	1	2	0	0	0	36	4
Montedio Yamagata	Total		62	7	5	1	2	0	1	0	70	8
Sagan Tosu	2026	J2/J3 (100)	6	0	–		–		–		6	0
Career total			145	14	9	2	5	0	4	1	163	17
