= Kotaro Hayashi =

Japanese footballer

Kotaro Hayashi 林 幸多郎
Personal information
- Date of birth: 16 November 2000 (age 25)
- Place of birth: Ureshino, Saga, Saga Prefecture, Japan
- Height: 1.70 m (5 ft 7 in)
- Position: Left back

Team information
- Current team: Urawa Red Diamonds
- Number: 18

Youth career
- Ureshino JSC
- –2018: Sagan Tosu

College career
Years	Team	Apps	(Gls)
2019–2022	Meiji University		

Senior career*
Years	Team	Apps	(Gls)
2023	Yokohama FC	29	(2)
2024–2026	Machida Zelvia	85	(4)
2026–	Urawa Red Diamonds	7	(1)
- * Club domestic league appearances and goals as of 22:50, 27 September 2026 (UTC)

Kotaro Hayashi (林 幸多郎, Hayashi Kotaro; born 16 November 2000) is a Japanese professional footballer who plays as a left back for J1 League club Urawa Red Diamonds.

== Early life ==
Hayashi was born in Ureshino, Saga and started playing football in the third grade of elementary school. He studied at Saga Prefectural Konan Junior High School and later Saga Prefectural Sagakita High School.

== Youth career ==
Hayashi started his youth football career with Sagan Tosu U-15s and quickly made his way up to the U-18s, being named as a substitute for them in 2016 at just 15. He made his debut for the U-18s in 2017 and became a regular starter in the 2018 season, captaining Sagan Tosu U-18s and helping them finish top of Prince Takamado JFA U-18 Prince League Kyushu and reach the quarter-finals of the Japan Club Youth Cup.

In February 2019, Meiji University announced that Hayashi would be joining their team. He became a registered member of the team in 2021. He made his debut for Meiji University in April 2021, coming off the bench to replace Ren Kato in a 2–1 JUFA Kanto League 1 match against the University of Tsukuba. He made 15 appearances in his first season, scoring two goals. In his final year, Hayashi was named captain and helped Meiji University win the league, despite fracturing his metatarsal midway through the season.

== Club career ==
=== Yokohama FC ===
Hayashi was offered a professional contract with Yokohama FC after playing a training game against them for Meiji University – a match he was not originally scheduled to take part in but played due to a clash with exams. It was officially announced in July 2022. He made his debut for the club in March 2023 in a 3–1 league defeat to Kashima Antlers. He also scored his first professional goal in his debut season, scoring in a 1–1 league draw with Sanfrecce Hiroshima. He made 32 appearances and scored two goals across all competitions in his debut season, but was unable to prevent Yokohama FC from being relegated to the J2 League.

=== Machida Zelvia ===
In January 2024, it was announced that Hayashi would be transferring to newly promoted J1 League club Machida Zelvia ahead of the 2024 season. He made 37 appearances across all competitions throughout the season, helping Machida to a third-placed finish.

In the 2025 Emperor's Cup, Hayashi scored the opening goal in the semi-final as Machida beat FC Tokyo 2–0 after extra time. The club went on to win the competition, defeating Vissel Kobe in the final – Hayashi's first piece of silverware.

Machida Zelvia's qualification for the AFC Champions League gave Hayashi his continental debut, in a 1–1 draw with FC Seoul during the 2025–26 season. He went on to make 13 appearances in the competition as Machida reached the final. Hayashi started the final, but Machida were beaten 1–0 after extra time by Al-Ahli.

=== Urawa Red Diamonds ===
In July 2026, it was announced that Hayashi would be transferring to fellow J1 League club Urawa Red Diamonds ahead of the 2026–27 J1 League season.

== Style of play ==
Hayashi is a right-footed left back and has named one of his favourite foreign players as João Cancelo. Due to the tactics played by Machida Zelvia during the 2024 season, Hayashi has been effective at long throw-ins. Hayashi is a hard-working player who is adept in one-on-one situations.

== Personal life ==
Alongside his football career, Hayashi has been studying for Japan's bar examination with the aim of qualifying as a lawyer, describing his daily routine as combining training and self-care with several hours of study on days without matches.

== Career statistics ==
=== Club ===
As of 27 September 2026

Appearances and goals by club, season and competition
Club	Season	League			National cup (Note: Includes Emperors Cup)		League cup (Note: Includes J.League Cup)		Continental		Total	
Club	Season	Division	Apps	Goals	Apps	Goals	Apps	Goals	Apps	Goals	Apps	Goals
Yokohama FC	2023	J1 League	29	2	–		3	0	–		32	2
Machida Zelvia	2024	J1 League	34	0	0	0	3	0	0	0	37	0
Machida Zelvia	2025	J1 League	33	4	6	1	2	0	13 (Note: Appearances in AFC Champions League Elite)	0	54	5
Machida Zelvia	2026	J1 (100)	18	0	–		–		0	0	18	0
Machida Zelvia	Total		85	4	6	1	5	0	13	0	109	5
Urawa Reds	2026–27	J1 League	7	1	1	0	–		–		8	1
Career total			121	7	7	1	8	0	13	0	149	8

== Honours ==
=== Club ===
Machida Zelvia

- Emperor's Cup: 2025
