= Riku Furuyado =

Japanese footballer

Personal information
- Date of birth: 18 April 2001 (age 25)
- Place of birth: Kanagawa, Japan
- Height: 1.78 m (5 ft 10 in)
- Position: Midfielder

Youth career
- Makigahara FC
- JFC Futuro
- Yokohama FC
- 2017–2019: Aomori Yamada High School

Senior career*
Years	Team	Apps	(Gls)
2020–2022	Yokohama FC	2	(0)
2021	→ Mito HollyHock (loan)	1	(0)
2022	→ YSCC Yokohama (loan)	16	(0)
2023	Kochi United		
- * Club domestic league appearances and goals as of 1 November 2024

Riku Furuyado (古宿 理久, Furuyado Riku; born 18 April 2001) is a Japanese footballer currently playing as a midfielder for Yokohama FC.

== Career statistics ==
=== Club ===
As of 9 July 2021.

Club	Season	League			National Cup		League Cup		Other		Total	
Club	Season	Division	Apps	Goals	Apps	Goals	Apps	Goals	Apps	Goals	Apps	Goals
Yokohama FC	2021	J1 League	2	0	1 (Note: Appearances in the Emperor's Cup)	0	3 (Note: Appearances in the J.League Cup)	0	0	0	6	0
Career total			2	0	1	0	3	0	0	0	6	0
