= Mauricio Caprini =

Brazilian footballer (born 1997)

Caprini
Personal information
- Full name: Mauricio Caprini Pinto
- Date of birth: 11 November 1997 (age 29)
- Place of birth: Caxias do Sul, Brazil
- Height: 1.67 m (5 ft 6 in)
- Position: Right winger

Team information
- Current team: RB Omiya Ardija
- Number: 11

Youth career
- 2014–2017: Juventude

Senior career*
Years	Team	Apps	(Gls)
2017–2021	Juventude	63	(4)
2018	→ Athletico Paranaense (loan)	0	(0)
2019	→ Bahia (loan)	0	(0)
2019	→ Esportivo (loan)	10	(1)
2020–2021	→ Ypiranga-RS (loan)	31	(11)
2021–2022	Londrina	80	(10)
2023–2024	Yokohama FC	60	(9)
2025–	RB Omiya Ardija	53	(19)
- * Club domestic league appearances and goals as of 21:07, 10 June 2026 (UTC)

Mauricio Caprini Pinto (born 11 November 1997), simply known as Caprini, is a Brazilian professional footballer who plays as a right winger for J2 League club RB Omiya Ardija.

== Career ==
Born in Caxias do Sul, Caprini was revealed by the youth sectors of EC Juventude. He played on loan for some teams, most notably for Ypiranga de Erechim. In May 2021, he joined Londrina, and participated in the final stage of the state title campaign. He remained at the club until 2023, when he was transferred to Yokohama FC.

On 4 January 2025, RB Omiya Ardija announced the signing of Caprini for the 2025 season.

== Personal life ==
Caprini is son of the former footballer Claudinho.

== Honours ==
Londrina

- Campeonato Paranaense: 2021
