= Shion Inoue =

Japanese footballer

Shion Inoue 井上 潮音
Personal information
- Full name: Shion Inoue
- Date of birth: 3 August 1997 (age 29)
- Place of birth: Kanagawa, Japan
- Height: 1.67 m (5 ft 6 in)
- Position: Winger

Team information
- Current team: Júbilo Iwata
- Number: 18

Youth career
- –2015: Tokyo Verdy

Senior career*
| Years | Team | Apps | (Gls) |
| 2016–2020 | Tokyo Verdy | 117 | (7) |
| 2021–2022 | Vissel Kobe | 29 | (0) |
| 2023–2024 | Yokohama FC | 34 | (3) |
| 2025 | Sanfrecce Hiroshima | 4 | (0) |
| 2025 | → Júbilo Iwata (loan) | 15 | (1) |
| 2026– | Júbilo Iwata | 13 | (0) |

International career
| 2017–2018 | Japan U-23 | 3 | (1) |
- * Club domestic league appearances and goals as of 14 August 2026

Shion Inoue (井上 潮音, Inoue Shion; born 3 August 1997 in Kanagawa) is a Japanese footballer who plays as a winger for J2 League club Júbilo Iwata.

== Career ==
On 6 January 2025, Inoue transferred to J1 League club Sanfrecce Hiroshima for the 2025 season.

== Career statistics ==
=== Club ===
As of 23 April 2026.

Appearances and goals by club, season and competition
| Club | Season | League | | | National cup (Note: Includes Emperors Cup) | | League cup (Note: Includes J.League Cup) | | Continental | | Other | | Total | |
| Club | Season | Division | Apps | Goals | Apps | Goals | Apps | Goals | Apps | Goals | Apps | Goals | Apps | Goals |
|---|---|---|---|---|---|---|---|---|---|---|---|---|---|---|
| Tokyo Verdy | 2016 | J2 League | 12 | 0 | 3 | 0 | – | | – | | 0 | 0 | 15 | 0 |
| Tokyo Verdy | 2017 | J2 League | 11 | 0 | 1 | 0 | – | | – | | 0 | 0 | 12 | 0 |
| Tokyo Verdy | 2018 | J2 League | 23 | 0 | 2 | 0 | – | | – | | 3 (Note: Appearance in J1/J2 play-offs) | 0 | 28 | 0 |
| Tokyo Verdy | 2019 | J2 League | 33 | 3 | 0 | 0 | – | | – | | 0 | 0 | 33 | 3 |
| Tokyo Verdy | 2020 | J2 League | 38 | 4 | 0 | 0 | – | | – | | 0 | 0 | 38 | 4 |
| Tokyo Verdy | Total | | 117 | 7 | 6 | 0 | 0 | 0 | 0 | 0 | 3 | 0 | 126 | 7 |
| Vissel Kobe | 2021 | J1 League | 22 | 0 | 3 | 0 | 3 | 0 | 0 | 0 | – | | 28 | 0 |
| Vissel Kobe | 2022 | J1 League | 7 | 0 | 3 | 0 | 2 | 0 | 4 (Note: Appearances in AFC Champions League Elite) | 1 | – | | 16 | 1 |
| Vissel Kobe | Total | | 29 | 0 | 6 | 0 | 5 | 0 | 4 | 1 | 0 | 0 | 44 | 1 |
| Yokohama FC | 2023 | J1 League | 34 | 3 | 0 | 0 | 3 | 0 | – | | – | | 37 | 3 |
| Yokohama FC | 2024 | J2 League | 28 | 0 | 0 | 0 | 0 | 0 | – | | – | | 28 | 0 |
| Yokohama FC | Total | | 62 | 3 | 0 | 0 | 3 | 0 | 0 | 0 | 0 | 0 | 65 | 3 |
| Sanfrecce Hiroshima | 2025 | J1 League | 4 | 0 | 1 | 0 | 0 | 0 | 1 (Note: Appearances in AFC Champions League Two) | 0 | 0 | 0 | 6 | 0 |
| Júbilo Iwata (loan) | 2025 | J2 League | 15 | 1 | 0 | 0 | – | | – | | 1 | 0 | 16 | 1 |
| Júbilo Iwata | 2026 | J2/J3 (100) | 9 | 0 | – | | – | | – | | 0 | 0 | 9 | 0 |
| Career total | | | 236 | 11 | 13 | 0 | 8 | 0 | 5 | 1 | 4 | 0 | 266 | 12 |

== Honours ==
Sanfrecce Hiroshima

- Japanese Super Cup: 2025
