= Yuri Lara =

Brazilian footballer

Personal information
- Full name: Yuri Lima Lara
- Date of birth: 20 April 1994 (age 32)
- Place of birth: Rio de Janeiro, Brazil
- Height: 1.73 m (5 ft 8 in)
- Position: Defensive midfielder

Team information
- Current team: Júbilo Iwata
- Number: 15

Youth career
- Olaria
- 2014–2015: Bahia

Senior career*
Years	Team	Apps	(Gls)
2015–2020	Bahia	34	(0)
2018	→ CSA (loan)	39	(0)
2019	→ Tochigi SC (loan)	10	(1)
2020	Oeste	23	(1)
2021	Ferroviária	10	(1)
2021	CSA	29	(3)
2022	Vasco da Gama	39	(0)
2023–2026	Yokohama FC	88	(9)
2025-2026	Mirassol	10	(0)
2026-	Júbilo Iwata	1	(0)
- * Club domestic league appearances and goals as of 14 August 2026

Yuri Lima Lara (born 20 April 1994) is a Brazilian footballer who plays as a defensive midfielder for Japanese side Júbilo Iwata.

== Playing career ==
He played for Olaria, Bahia and CSA. He joined J2 League club Tochigi SC in 2019.

== Honours ==
=== Individual ===
- J2 League Best XI: 2024
