= Zain Issaka =

Japanese footballer

Zain Issaka イサカ ゼイン
Personal information
- Full name: Zain Issaka
- Date of birth: 29 May 1997 (age 29)
- Place of birth: Machida, Tokyo, Japan
- Height: 1.74 m (5 ft 9 in)
- Position: Defender

Team information
- Current team: JEF United Chiba
- Number: 42

Youth career
- Machida JFC
- 2013–2015: Toko Gakuen High School

College career
Years	Team	Apps	(Gls)
2016–2019	Toin University of Yokohama		

Senior career*
Years	Team	Apps	(Gls)
2019–2022	Kawasaki Frontale	1	(0)
2022	→ Yokohama FC (loan)	29	(2)
2023–2025	Montedio Yamagata	102	(12)
2025–	JEF United Chiba	33	(3)
- * Club domestic league appearances and goals as of 12 August 2026

Zain Issaka (イサカ ゼイン, Issaka Zain; born 29 May 1997) is a Japanese footballer who plays as a defender for J1 League club JEF United Chiba.

== Career statistics ==
=== Club ===
As of 21 February 2026

Appearances and goals by club, season and competition
Club	Season	League			National Cup		League Cup		Other		Total	
Club	Season	Division	Apps	Goals	Apps	Goals	Apps	Goals	Apps	Goals	Apps	Goals
Japan			League		Emperor's Cup		J. League Cup		Other		Total	
Toin University	2019	—			2	1	–				2	1
Kawasaki Frontale	2019	J1 League	0	0	0	0	0	0	–		0	0
Kawasaki Frontale	2020	J1 League	0	0	0	0	0	0	–		0	0
Kawasaki Frontale	2021	J1 League	1	0	1	0	1	1	2 (Note: Appearances in the AFC Champions League)	1	5	2
Kawasaki Frontale	Total		1	0	1	0	1	1	2	1	5	2
Yokohama FC (loan)	2022	J2 League	29	2	0	0	–		–		29	2
Montedio Yamagata	2023	J2 League	40	6	2	0	–		1 (Note: Appearance in J1/J2 promotion play-off)	0	43	6
Montedio Yamagata	2024	J2 League	37	5	0	0	0	0	1	0	38	5
Montedio Yamagata	2025	J2 League	23	1	1	0	2	1	–		26	2
Montedio Yamagata	Total		100	12	3	0	2	1	2	0	107	13
JEF United Chiba	2025	J2 League	14	2	0	0	0	0	2	0	16	2
JEF United Chiba	2026 (100)	J1 League	2	0	0	0	0	0	–		2	0
JEF United Chiba	Total		16	2	0	0	0	0	2	0	18	2
Career total			146	16	6	1	3	2	6	1	161	20

== Honours ==
=== Club ===
- J1 League: 2021
