= Yuya Takagi =

Japanese footballer

Yuya Takagi 高木 友也
Personal information
- Full name: Yuya Takagi
- Date of birth: 23 May 1998 (age 28)
- Place of birth: Yokohama, Kanagawa, Japan
- Height: 1.76 m (5 ft 9 in)
- Position: Defender

Team information
- Current team: Tokushima Vortis
- Number: 42

Youth career
- –2013: Buddy SC
- 2014–2016: Hosei Univ. Daini High School

College career
Years	Team	Apps	(Gls)
2017–2020	Hosei University		

Senior career*
Years	Team	Apps	(Gls)
2020–2022	Yokohama FC	40	(1)
2022	→ Thespakusatsu Gunma (loan)	12	(1)
2023–2024	Fagiano Okayama	39	(1)
2025–	Tokushima Vortis	56	(9)
- * Club domestic league appearances and goals as of 14 August 2026

Yuya Takagi (高木 友也, Takagi Yuya; born 23 May 1998) is a Japanese footballer currently playing as a left-back for J2 League club Tokushima Vortis.

== Career ==
Takagi began his youth career with Buddy SC and Hosei University Daini High School. Takagi was enrolled in Hosei University from 2017 to 2020.

On 20 March 2020, Yokohama FC announced that Takagi would join the club from the 2021 season. He was also registered as a specially designated player. On 12 August 2020, he made his professional debut against Hokkaido Consadole Sapporo in the J.League Cup. On 27 February 2021, he made his league debut by starting in his first J1 match against Consadole Sapporo.

On 1 August 2022, Takagi was loaned out to J2 club Thespakusatsu Gunma. He made his league debut against JEF United Chiba on 7 August 2022. Takagi scored his first league goal against Mito HollyHock on 23 October 2022, scoring in the 58th minute. On 16 December 2022, his loan contract expired and he returned to Yokohama FC.

On 16 December 2022, Takagi transferred to J2 club Fagiano Okayama after his contract expired at Yokohama FC. He made his league debut against Júbilo Iwata on 18 February 2023. Takagi scored his first league goal against Zweigen Kanazawa on 12 March 2023, scoring in the 85th minute.

On 18 December 2024, Takagi was announced at Tokushima Vortis.

== Style of play ==
Takagi is described as having good stamina, vision and skilful positioning.

== Career statistics ==
=== Club ===
As of 30 March 2026.

Appearances and goals by club, season and competition
Club	Season	League			National cup (Note: Includes Emperors Cup)		League cup (Note: Includes J.League Cup)		Other		Total	
Club	Season	Division	Apps	Goals	Apps	Goals	Apps	Goals	Apps	Goals	Apps	Goals
Hosei University	2019	–			4	0	–		–		4	0
Yokohama FC	2020		0	0	0	0	1	0	–		1	0
Yokohama FC	2021	J1 League	29	1	1	0	4	0	–		34	1
Yokohama FC	2022	J2 League	11	0	2	0	0	0	–		13	0
Yokohama FC	Total		40	1	3	0	5	0	0	0	48	1
Thespakusatsu Gunma (loan)	2022	J2 League	12	1	–		–		–		12	1
Fagiano Okayama	2023	J2 League	34	1	2	0	–		–		36	1
Fagiano Okayama	2024	J2 League	5	0	1	0	–		–		6	0
Fagiano Okayama	Total		39	1	3	0	0	0	0	0	42	1
Tokushima Vortis	2025	J2 League	37	4	1	0	1	0	2 (Note: Appearance in J1/J2 play-offs)	0	41	4
Tokushima Vortis	2026	J2/J3 (100)	8	3	0	0	0	0	0	0	8	3
Tokushima Vortis	Total		45	7	1	0	1	0	2	0	49	7
Career total			136	10	11	0	6	0	2	0	155	10
