= Kaisei Ishii =

Japanese footballer

Kaisei Ishii 石井 快征
Personal information
- Full name: Kaisei Ishii
- Date of birth: April 2, 2000 (age 26)
- Place of birth: Fukuoka, Japan
- Height: 1.74 m (5 ft 8 1/2 in)
- Position: Forward

Team information
- Current team: FC Ryukyu
- Number: 11

Youth career
- 2016–2018: Sagan Tosu

Senior career*
Years	Team	Apps	(Gls)
2018–2022	Sagan Tosu	24	(3)
2021	→ Ehime FC (loan)	12	(1)
2022	→ Yokohama FC (loan)	0	(0)
2023	Yokohama FC	0	(0)
2024–	→ FC Ryukyu	0	(0)
- * Club domestic league appearances and goals as of 02:38, 26 December 2023

Kaisei Ishii (石井 快征, Ishii Kaisei; born April 2, 2000) is a Japanese professional footballer who plays as a forward for FC Ryukyu.

== Playing career ==
Ishii was born in the Fukuoka Prefecture on April 2, 2000. He joined J1 League club Sagan Tosu from their youth team in 2018. He made his debut for Sagan on the 15 June 2019 against Urawa Red Diamonds. He scored his first goal for Sagan against Cerezo Osaka, scoring in the 51st minute on the 26 July 2020.

Kaisei made his debut for Ehime against Giravanz Kitakyushu on the 20th of June 2021. He scored his first goal for the club on the 12 September 2021, scoring in the 62nd minute.

Kaisei is yet to make an appearance for Yokohama.

== Career statistics ==
Last update: 27 February 2019

Appearances and goals by club, season and competition
Club	Season	League			Emperor's Cup		J.League Cup		Total	
Club	Season	Division	Apps	Goals	Apps	Goals	Apps	Goals	Apps	Goals
Sagan Tosu	2018	J1 League	0	0	1	0	2	1	3	1
Sagan Tosu	2019	J1 League	1	0	2	0	1	0	4	0
Sagan Tosu	2020	J1 League	18	3	–		1	0	19	3
Sagan Tosu	2021	J1 League	5	0	0	0	6	0	11	0
Ehime FC (loan)	2021	J2 League	12	1	0	0	–		12	1
Sagan Tosu	2022	J1 League	0	0	0	0	3	0	3	0
Career total			36	4	3	0	13	1	52	5

== Honours ==
Sagan Tosu

- Lunar New Year Cup: 2019 (runners-up)

Yokohama FC

- J2 League: 2022 (runners-up)
