= 2023 Iwaki FC season =

Iwaki FC
2023 season
- Chairman: Satoshi Okura
- Manager: Hiromasa Suguri (until 14 June); Yuzo Tamura (from 15 June)
- Stadium: Iwaki Greenfield Stadium (Iwaki, Fukushima)
- J2 League: 18th
- Emperor's Cup: Second round
- Top goalscorer: League: Kaina Tanimura (7 goals); Hiroto Iwabuchi (7 goals); All: Kaina Tanimura (7 goals); Hiroto Iwabuchi (7 goals)
- Highest home attendance: 5,044 (v. Montedio Yamagata, J2 League, 4 April 2023)
- Lowest home attendance: 2,011 (v. Roasso Kumamoto, J2 League, 3 June 2023)
- Average home league attendance: 3,491
- Biggest win: 1–5 (v. Omiya Ardija, J2 League, 24 June 2023)
- Biggest defeat: 9–1 (v. Shimizu S-Pulse, J2 League, 7 May 2023)
Home colours	Away colours

The 2023 season was the 11th season in the existence of Iwaki FC. It was the club's first season in the J2 League, the second tier of Japanese football after becoming champions of the J3 League in 2022. As well as the domestic league, they competed in the Emperor's Cup, in which they were knocked out in the second round. Iwaki finished the league season in 18th place, eight points clear of relegation.

== Squad ==
=== Season squad ===
Squad no.	Name	Nationality	Position(s)	Date of birth (age at start of season)
Goalkeepers
1	Kengo Tanaka	(Japan)	GK	30 December 1989 (aged 33)
21	Toru Takagiwa	(Japan)	GK	15 April 1995 (aged 27)
31	Shuhei Shikano	(Japan)	GK	27 August 1999 (aged 23)
Defenders
2	Yusuke Ishida	(Japan)	CB / RB	11 November 2002 (aged 20)
3	Ryo Endo	(Japan)	CB	6 July 1998 (aged 24)
4	Rei Ieizumi	(Japan)	CB	20 January 2000 (aged 23)
5	Shuhei Hayami	(Japan)	CB	11 November 2000 (aged 22)
16	Takumi Kawamura	(Japan)	CB	13 September 2000 (aged 22)
29	Yuma Tsujioka ^{DSP}	(Japan)	DF	9 December 2001 (aged 21)
30	Wataru Kuromiya	(Japan)	CB	21 December 1998 (aged 24)
35	Genki Egawa	(Japan)	CB	2 April 2000 (aged 22)
Midfielders
6	Eiji Miyamoto	(Japan)	DM	3 August 1998 (aged 24)
7	Reo Sugiyama	(Japan)	LM / CM	4 March 2000 (aged 22)
8	Riku Saga	(Japan)	RM / RB	27 May 1998 (aged 24)
13	Mizuki Kaburaki	(Japan)	MF	28 May 2000 (aged 22)
14	Daiki Yamaguchi	(Japan)	CM / AM	2 November 1997 (aged 25)
15	Naoki Kase	(Japan)	CM	7 June 2000 (aged 22)
20	Sota Nagai	(Japan)	LM	15 August 1999 (aged 23)
22	Yuma Kato ^{DSP}	(Japan)	MF	15 December 2001 (aged 21)
24	Yuto Yamashita (c)	(Japan)	DM	24 May 1996 (aged 26)
25	Asahi Haga	(Japan)	RM / AM	30 July 2000 (aged 22)
27	Nélson Henrique	(Brazil)	MF	7 June 2002 (aged 20)
28	Kiwara Miyazaki	(Japan)	RW / LW	17 February 1998 (aged 25)
33	Yoshihiro Shimoda	(Japan)	DM	4 May 2004 (aged 18)
Forwards
9	Yoshihito Kondo ^{DSP}	(Japan)	FW	3 March 2002 (aged 20)
10	Kotaro Arima	(Japan)	FW / SS	3 September 2000 (aged 22)
11	Ryo Arita	(Japan)	FW	28 August 1999 (aged 23)
17	Kaina Tanimura	(Japan)	FW / LW	5 March 1998 (aged 24)
18	Shu Yoshizawa	(Japan)	FW	21 October 1998 (aged 24)
19	Hiroto Iwabuchi	(Japan)	FW	17 September 1997 (aged 25)
26	Iori Sakamoto	(Japan)	FW	22 November 2004 (aged 18)

Last updated: 27 July 2023.
Source: Iwaki FC website

== Transfers ==
=== Arrivals ===
Date	Position	Player	From	Type	Source
29 January 2022	MF	(Japan) Asahi Haga	(Japan) Sakushin Gakuin University	Full	
16 November 2022	MF	(Japan) Mizuki Kaburaki	(Japan) Takushoku University	Full	
16 November 2022	DF	(Japan) Takumi Kawamura	(Japan) Osaka University of Physical Education	Full	
16 November 2022	DF	(Japan) Shuhei Hayami	(Japan) Tokoha University	Full	
7 December 2022	DF	(Japan) Yusuke Ishida	(Japan) Gainare Tottori	Full	
12 December 2022	FW	(Japan) Iori Sakamoto	(Japan) Hōtoku Gakuen High School	Full	
13 December 2022	MF	(Japan) Yoshihiro Shimoda	(Japan) Kashima Antlers	Loan	
23 December 2022	MF	(Japan) Naoki Kase	(Japan) Ryutsu Keizai University	Full	
25 December 2022	GK	(Japan) Toru Takagiwa	(Japan) Tokyo Verdy	Loan	
26 December 2022	MF	(Japan) Kiwara Miyazaki	(Japan) Fagiano Okayama	Loan	
7 February 2023	FW	(Japan) Yoshihito Kondo	(Japan) Nagoya Gakuin University	DSP	
7 February 2023	MF	(Japan) Yuma Kato	(Japan) Takushoku University	DSP	
7 February 2023	DF	(Japan) Yuma Tsujioka	(Japan) International Pacific University	DSP	
28 July 2023	MF	(Brazil) Nélson Henrique	(Portugal) S.C. Praiense	Loan	

=== Departures ===
Date	Position	Player	To	Type	Source
19 November 2022	MF	(Japan) Ryoma Ito		Released	
26 November 2022	GK	(Japan) Daiki Sakata	(Japan) Avispa Fukuoka	Full	
26 November 2022	MF	(Japan) Masaru Hidaka	(Japan) JEF United Chiba	Full	
8 December 2022	DF	(Japan) Kyowaan Hoshi	(Japan) Yokohama FC	End of loan	
12 December 2022	FW	(Japan) Shota Suzuki	(Japan) Kagoshima United	Full	
18 December 2022	DF	(Japan) Daigo Masuzaki	(Japan) Cobaltore Onagawa	Full	
22 December 2022	MF	(Japan) Kentaro Matsumoto	(Japan) Tokyo 23 FC	Full	
23 December 2022	GK	(Japan) Kanta Tanaka	(Japan) Tochigi City FC	Full	
23 December 2022	MF	(Japan) Genya Sekino	(Japan) Tochigi City FC	Full	
26 December 2022	DF	(Japan) Tetsuya Yonezawa	(Japan) Okinawa SV	Full	
26 December 2022	MF	(Japan) Nagi Kawatani	(Japan) Shimizu S-Pulse	End of loan	
26 December 2022	DF	(Japan) Ryo Odajima	(Japan) Okinawa SV	Full	
28 December 2022	FW	(Japan) Daigo Furukawa	(Japan) FC Osaka	Loan	
14 January 2023	DF	(Japan) Tomoki Yoshida	(Japan) Kochi United SC	Loan	

== Pre-season and friendlies ==
22 January Training match	Iwaki FC	5–2	Tokyo 23 FC	Hirono
		Report		Stadium: J-Village Stadium
Note: The match consisted of three 30-minute halves

28 January Training match	Iwaki FC	1–2	NIFS Kanoya	Kagoshima
		Report		Stadium: Kagoshima Kenko-no-mori Park

4 February Training match	Iwaki FC	0–1	Urawa Red Diamonds
		Report
Note: The match consisted of three 45-minute halves

== Competitions ==
=== Overview ===
Competition	First match	Last match	Starting round	Final position	Record							
Competition	First match	Last match	Starting round	Final position	Pld	W	D	L	GF	GA	GD	Win %
J2 League	18 February 2023	12 November 2023	Matchday 1	18th	42	12	19	11	45	69	−24	28.57
Emperor's Cup	7 June 2023	7 June 2023	Second round	Second round	1	0	0	1	1	2	−1	0.00
Total					43	12	19	12	46	71	−25	27.91

Source: Competitions

=== J2 League ===
Pos	Team	Pld	W	D	L	GF	GA	GD	Pts
16	Vegalta Sendai	42	12	12	18	48	61	−13	48
17	Mito HollyHock	42	11	14	17	49	66	−17	47
18	Iwaki FC	42	12	11	19	45	69	−24	47
19	Tochigi SC	42	10	14	18	39	47	−8	44
20	Renofa Yamaguchi	42	10	14	18	37	67	−30	44

Source: Meiji Yasuda J2 League, J.League Data Site
Rules for classification: 1) Points; 2) Goal difference; 3) Goals scored; 4) Head-to-head points; 5) Head-to-head goal difference; 6) Head-to-head goal scored; 7) Fair-play points.

==== Results by matchday ====
Round	1	2	3	4	5	6	7	8	9	10	11	12	13	14	15	16	17	18	19	20	21	22	23	24	25	26	27	28	29	30	31	32	33	34	35	36	37	38	39	40	41	42
Ground	H	A	H	A	H	H	A	H	A	H	A	H	A	A	H	H	A	A	H	A	H	A	A	H	H	A	A	H	A	H	H	A	H	A	A	H	A	H	H	A	H	A
Result	L	D	L	W	W	L	D	L	L	W	L	L	L	L	L	W	D	D	L	L	D	W	D	W	W	D	W	L	D	D	D	W	L	L	L	W	W	D	L	L	L	W
Position	16	14	19	15	9	12	15	17	19	16	19	20	20	22	22	21	20	21	21	21	21	21	21	21	19	19	17	18	17	17	18	15	18	18	19	19	18	17	17	19	19	18

Source: J. League Data Site
A = Away; H = Home; W = Win; D = Draw; L = Loss

==== Matches ====
The full league fixtures were released on 20 January 2023.

18 February 1	Iwaki FC	2–3	Fujieda MYFC	Iwaki
14:00 JST	Saga (yellow card) 43' (goal) 49'; Tanimura 60'; Kondo (yellow card) 75'	Report	Watanabe 35', 45'; Yokoyama 37'; Kaneura (yellow card) 90'	Stadium: Iwaki Greenfield Stadium; Attendance: 4,318; Referee: Reo Tanaka

26 February 2	Mito HollyHock	2–2	Iwaki FC	Mito
15:03 JST	Umeda 54'; Teranuma 68'; Toyama (yellow card) 90+1'	Report	Miyamoto (yellow card) 37'; Tanimura 59'; Arita 74'	Stadium: K's denki Stadium Mito; Attendance: 5,028; Referee: Yuzo Sutani

5 March 3	Iwaki FC	0–1	Renofa Yamaguchi	Iwaki
13:03 JST	Egawa (yellow card) 45+1'	Report	Sato (yellow card) 36'; Minagawa 65'; Takagi (yellow card) 88'	Stadium: Iwaki Greenfield Stadium; Attendance: 2,563; Referee: Keisuke Nobori

12 March 4	Vegalta Sendai	0–1	Iwaki FC	Sendai
14:03 JST	Uchida (yellow card) 19'; Nakayama (yellow card) 53'; Sugata (yellow card) 65'; Heo (yellow card) 78'	Report	Egawa 20'	Stadium: Yurtec Stadium Sendai; Attendance: 12,269; Referee: Atsushi Kamimura

19 March 5	Iwaki FC	1–0	Tokushima Vortis	Iwaki
14:03 JST	Tanimura 71'; Sugiyama (yellow card) 90+1'	Report	Sakurai (yellow card) 45+1'; Watari (yellow card) 89'	Stadium: Iwaki Greenfield Stadium; Attendance: 3,100; Referee: Hiroyoshi Takayama

26 March 6	Iwaki FC	0–1	Machida Zelvia	Iwaki
14:03 JST		Report	Okuyama (yellow card) 84'; Kurokawa 87'	Stadium: Iwaki Greenfield Stadium; Attendance: 2,022; Referee: Hirokazu Otsubo

2 April 7	Fagiano Okayama	1–1	Iwaki FC	Okayama
14:03 JST	Sakuragawa 90+4' (pen.); Lucão (yellow card) 90+8'	Report	Miyamoto 10' (yellow card) 90+3'; Endo (yellow card) 27'; Arima (yellow card) 70'	Stadium: City Light Stadium; Attendance: 6,577; Referee: Tetsuro Yoshida

8 April 8	Iwaki FC	1–3	Oita Trinita	Iwaki
14:03 JST	Miyamoto (yellow card) 22'; Sugiyama (yellow card) 57'; Kondo 81'	Report	Nakagawa 7' (yellow card) 59'; Yumiba 65'; Nomura 68'	Stadium: Iwaki Greenfield Stadium; Attendance: 2,477; Referee: Toru Kakinuma

12 April 9	Zweigen Kanazawa	3–0	Iwaki FC	Kanazawa
19:03 JST	Sugira 6', 14', 37'; Rikiyasu (yellow card) 79'	Report	Sugiyama (yellow card) 50' (yellow-red card) 71'	Stadium: Ishikawa Kanazawa Stadium; Attendance: 1,516; Referee: Keigo Sendachi

16 April 10	Iwaki FC	2–1	Thespakusatsu Gunma	Iwaki
14:03 JST	Arita 6', 49'; Kaburaki (yellow card) 13'; Endo (yellow card) 78'	Report	Nagakura 64'	Stadium: Iwaki Greenfield Stadium; Attendance: 2,590; Referee: Shuhei Shimizu

23 April 11	Tochigi SC	1–0	Iwaki FC	Utsunomiya
14:03 JST	Fukushima 2'	Report		Stadium: Kanseki Stadium Tochigi; Attendance: 5,169; Referee: Keisuke Nobori

29 April 12	Iwaki FC	0–1	V-Varen Nagasaki	Iwaki
14:00 JST		Report	Kuwasaki (yellow card) 32'; Juanma 72'	Stadium: Iwaki Greenfield Stadium; Attendance: 3,403; Referee: Yuzo Sutani

3 May 13	Ventforet Kofu	1–0	Iwaki FC	Kofu
14:00 JST	Utaka 39'	Report	Endo (red card) 31'; Kondo (yellow card) 89'	Stadium: Yamanashi Chuo Bank Stadium, Kofu; Attendance: 10,561; Referee: Tomokazu Sato

7 May 14	Shimizu S-Pulse	9–1	Iwaki FC	Shizuoka
14:03 JST	Inui 2'; Nakayama 16', 45+2', 57'; Ibayashi 51'; Carlinhos Júnior 52'; Santana 71', 85', 90+8' (pen.)	Report	Yoshizawa 90+4'; Miyamoto (yellow card) 90+7'	Stadium: IAI Stadium Nihondaira, Shizuoka; Attendance: 8,022; Referee: Atsushi Kamimura

14 May 15	Iwaki FC	0–1	Blaublitz Akita	Iwaki
13:34 JST	Saga (red card) 76'	Report	Yoshida 80'	Stadium: Iwaki Greenfield Stadium; Attendance: 2,458; Referee: Hiroyoshi Takayama

17 May 16	Iwaki FC	2–1	Omiya Ardija	Iwaki
19:03 JST	Yamaguchi 22'; Endo 59'; Nagai (yellow card) 90' (yellow card) 90+7' (yellow-red card)	Report	Kojima (yellow card) 10'; Hakamata 16' (yellow card) 44'; Nuki (yellow card) 58'	Stadium: Iwaki Greenfield Stadium; Attendance: 2,793; Referee: Hayato Shimizu

21 May 17	Júbilo Iwata	1–1	Iwaki FC	Iwata
16:04 JST	Yoshinaga (yellow card) 45+1'; Uehara (yellow card) 53'; Dudu 81'	Report	Endo 90'	Stadium: Yamaha Stadium; Attendance: 8,443; Referee: Yoshimi Yamashita

28 May 18	Tokyo Verdy	0–0	Iwaki FC	Tokyo
14:03 JST		Report	Miyamoto (yellow card) 23'	Stadium: Ajinomoto Stadium; Attendance: 6,877; Referee: Kazuyoshi Enomoto

3 June 19	Iwaki FC	0–4	Roasso Kumamoto	Iwaki
13:00 JST	Egawa (yellow card) 67'	Report	Aihara 16'; Onishi 22'; Kamimura (yellow card) 33'; Omoto 58'; Hirakawa 63'; Ezaki (yellow card) 70'	Stadium: Iwaki Greenfield Stadium; Attendance: 2,011; Referee: Tetsuro Yoshida

11 June 20	Montedio Yamagata	3–0	Iwaki FC	Tendō
14:03 JST	Alves 48'; Kato 79', 90+1'; Okazaki (yellow card) 90+3'	Report	Egawa (yellow card) 19'; Miyamoto (yellow card) 57'	Stadium: ND Soft Stadium Yamagata; Attendance: 6,139; Referee: Yuzo Sutani

18 June 21	Iwaki FC	0–0	JEF United Chiba	Iwaki
16:03 JST	Saga (yellow card) 45+1'; Endo (yellow card) 50'	Report	Hidaka (yellow card) 40'; Taguchi (yellow card) 45+4'	Stadium: Iwaki Greenfield Stadium; Attendance: 3,350; Referee: Tomokazu Sato

24 June 22	Omiya Ardija	1–5	Iwaki FC	Saitama
18:00 JST	Takayanagi (yellow card) 5'; Oyama (yellow card) 85'	Report	Yoshizawa 7'; Shimoda (yellow card) 13'; Miyamoto 25'; Urakami 39' (o.g.); Arita (yellow card) 52'; Tanimura 55'; Nagai (yellow card) 79'; Egawa (yellow card) 81'; Iwabuchi 83'	Stadium: NACK5 Stadium Omiya; Attendance: 5,433; Referee: Keigo Sendachi

2 July 23	Blaublitz Akita	1–1	Iwaki FC	Akita
18:03 JST	Mikami 78'; Kakoi (yellow card) 88'	Report	Kondo (yellow card) 68'; Iwabuchi 90+2' (pen.)	Stadium: Soyu Stadium; Attendance: 2,181; Referee: Shuhei Shimizu

5 July 24	Iwaki FC	1–0	Tochigi SC	Iwaki
19:03 JST	Ieizumi (yellow card) 55'; Iwabuchi 72'; Shimoda (yellow card) 90+3'	Report	Okazaki (yellow card) 76'	Stadium: Iwaki Greenfield Stadium; Attendance: 2,888; Referee: Reo Tanaka

9 July 25	Iwaki FC	4–3	Mito Hollyhock	Iwaki
18:03 JST	Kondo (yellow card) 26'; Kusumoto 29' (o.g.); Iwabuchi 65', 88'; Tanimura 67'	Report	Ohara 5'; Teranuma 45+1'; Unoki 60'; Kusano (yellow card) 85'	Stadium: Iwaki Greenfield Stadium; Attendance: 3,705; Referee: Shu Kawamata

15 July 26	Renofa Yamaguchi	0–0	Iwaki FC	Yamaguchi
19:03 JST	Minagawa (yellow card) 22'	Report	Ishida (yellow card) 28'; Arita (yellow card) 60'	Stadium: Ishin Me-Life Stadium; Attendance: 4,011; Referee: Yosuke Kubota

22 July 27	Oita Trinita	1–2	Iwaki FC	Ōita
19:03 JST	Yasuda (yellow card) 37'; Yumiba (yellow card) 90+5'	Report	Tanimura (yellow card) 17'; Yamaguchi 45+5'; Iwabuchi 58'	Stadium: Resonac Dome Oita; Attendance: 6,450; Referee: Yozo Sutani

29 July 28	Iwaki FC	0–1	Júbilo Iwata	Iwaki
18:03 JST		Report	Kaneko (yellow card) 68'; Germain 85'; González (yellow card) 90+10'	Stadium: Iwaki Greenfield Stadium; Attendance: 5,039; Referee: Koichiro Fukushima

6 August 29	V-Varen Nagasaki	0–0	Iwaki FC	Isahaya
18:03 JST	Juanma (yellow card) 40'	Report	Takagiwa (yellow card) 90+4'	Stadium: Transcosmos Stadium Nagasaki; Attendance: 6,223; Referee: Tetsuro Yoshida

13 August 30	Iwaki FC	1–1	Ventforet Kofu	Iwaki
18:03 JST	Yamaguchi 11'; Egawa (yellow card) 66'; Yamashita (yellow card) 72'; Kawamura (yellow card) 85'	Report	Sato 44' (yellow card) 50'	Stadium: Iwaki Greenfield Stadium; Attendance: 4,386; Referee: Dai Matsumoto

19 August 31	Iwaki FC	0–0	Tokyo Verdy	Iwaki
18:04 JST	Arima (yellow card) 45'; Egawa (yellow card) 90+4'	Report	Kato (yellow card) 74'	Stadium: Iwaki Greenfield Stadium; Attendance: 4,198; Referee: Atsushi Kamimura

27 August 32	Roasso Kumamoto	2–4	Iwaki FC	Kumamoto
19:03 JST	Endo 23' (o.g.); Hirakawa 30' (yellow card) 70'; Aihara (yellow card) 38'	Report	Ieizumi 9', 61'; Yamashita 68' (pen.), 72'; Iwabuchi (yellow card) 70'; Kato (yellow card) 78'	Stadium: Egao Kenko Stadium; Attendance: 3,725; Referee: Yudai Yamamoto

3 September 33	Iwaki FC	1–2	Fagiano Okayama	Iwaki
18:03 JST	Shimoda (yellow card) 59' (goal) 66'; Kase (yellow card) 88'; Ieizumi (yellow card) 90'	Report	Motoyama (yellow card) 23'; Alves 50'; Mauk (yellow card) 79' (goal) 90' (pen.); Sakuragawa (yellow card) 90+1'	Stadium: Iwaki Greenfield Stadium; Attendance: 3,030; Referee: Reo Tanaka

10 September 34	Tokushima Vortis	2–0	Iwaki FC	Naruto
19:03 JST	Ishio 23'; Nishino (yellow card) 62'; Uchida 90'	Report	Ieizumi (yellow card) 12'; Tanimura (yellow card) 77'; Saga (yellow card) 84'	Stadium: Pocarisweat Stadium; Attendance: 4,799; Referee: Tomokazu Sato

17 September 35	Thespakusatsu Gunma	1–0	Iwaki FC	Maebashi
19:03 JST	Nakashio 30'; Sato (yellow card) 42'	Report	Arita (yellow card) 48'	Stadium: Shoda Shoyu Stadium Gunma; Attendance: 4,383; Referee: Shu Kawamata

23 September 36	Iwaki FC	1–0	Zweigen Kanazawa	Iwaki
18:04 JST	Yamaguchi (yellow card) 51'; Arima (yellow card) 72'; Miyamoto 86'	Report	Kato (yellow card) 28'; Bahia (yellow card) 89'	Stadium: Iwaki Greenfield Stadium; Attendance: 4,241; Referee: Kazuyoshi Enomoto

1 October 37	FC Machida Zelvia	2–3	Iwaki FC	Machida
14:03 JST	Jang 51'; Duke 85'	Report	Yamashita 31'; Tanimura 41'; Endo 46' (yellow card) 66'	Stadium: Machida GION Stadium; Attendance: 6,417; Referee: Toru Kakinuma

8 October 38	Iwaki FC	2–2	Vegalta Sendai	Iwaki
14:03 JST	Iwabuchi 18'; Tanimura (yellow card) 63'; Nagai 68'	Report	Kida 35' (pen.); Kamada 57'; Mase (yellow card) 60'; Goke (yellow card) 74'; Heo (yellow card) 84'; Ewerton (yellow card) 90+5'	Stadium: Iwaki Greenfield Stadium; Attendance: 4,889; Referee: Koji Takasaki

21 October 39	Iwaki FC	1–7	Shimizu S-Pulse	Iwaki
13:03 JST	Yamaguchi (yellow card) 36'; Tanimura 41'; Yoshizawa (yellow card) 45+3'	Report	Nakayama 11', 30'; Hara 32'; Yamahara 59'; Shirasaki 62'; Kitazume 75'; Kishimoto 90+2'	Stadium: Iwaki Greenfield Stadium; Attendance: 4,801; Referee: Akihiko Ikeuchi

29 October 40	JEF United Chiba	1–0	Iwaki FC	Chiba
14:03 JST	Miki (yellow card) 45+3'; Komori 86'	Report	Endo (yellow card) 14' (yellow-red card) 44'; Shimoda (yellow card) 79'	Stadium: Fukuda Denshi Arena; Attendance: 13,922; Referee: Reo Tanaka

4 November 41	Iwaki FC	1–3	Montedio Yamagata	Iwaki
14:03 JST	Arima 56'; Tanimura (yellow card) 74'	Report	Noda (yellow card) 55'; Alves 62'; Takahashi 69'; Dellatorre 80'; Hasegawa (yellow card) 81'; Yokoyama (yellow card) 85'	Stadium: Iwaki Greenfield Stadium; Attendance: 5,044; Referee: Dai Matsumoto

12 November 42	Fujieda MYFC	2–4	Iwaki FC	Fujieda
13:03 JST	Anderson (red card) 40'; Yamura 59' (pen.); Kawashima (yellow card) 81'; Osone 90'	Report	Kondo 13', 52'; Shimoda (yellow card) 34'; Kase (yellow card) 50'; Yamashita (yellow card) 73'; Yamaguchi 80'; Nagai 83'	Stadium: Fujieda Soccer Stadium; Attendance: 3,425; Referee: Tetsuro Yoshida

=== Emperor's Cup ===
As a J2 club, Iwaki entered the competition at the second round.

7 June Second round	Tokushima Vortis	2–1 (a.e.t.)	Iwaki FC	Naruto
19:00	Tanahashi 90+5'; Chiba 115'	Report	Endo 90+3'	Stadium: Pocarisweat Stadium; Attendance: 1,441; Referee: Yudai Yamamoto

== Statistics ==
=== Goalscorers ===
The list is sorted by shirt number when total goals are equal.

Rnk	Pos	No.	Player	J2	EC	Total
1	FW	17	(Japan) Kaina Tanimura	7	0	7
1	FW	19	(Japan) Hiroto Iwabuchi	7	0	7
3	DF	3	(Japan) Ryo Endo	3	1	4
3	MF	14	(Japan) Daiki Yamaguchi	4	0	4
5	MF	6	(Japan) Eiji Miyamoto	3	0	3
5	FW	9	(Japan) Yoshihito Kondo	3	0	3
5	FW	11	(Japan) Ryo Arita	3	0	3
5	MF	24	(Japan) Yuto Yamashita	3	0	3
9	DF	4	(Japan) Rei Ieizumi	2	0	2
9	FW	18	(Japan) Shu Yoshizawa	2	0	2
9	MF	20	(Japan) Sota Nagai	2	0	2
9	–	–	Own goal	2	0	2
13	MF	8	(Japan) Riku Saga	1	0	1
13	FW	10	(Japan) Kotaro Arima	1	0	1
13	MF	33	(Japan) Yoshihiro Shimoda	1	0	1
13	DF	35	(Japan) Genki Egawa	1	0	1
TOTALS				45	1	46

Last updated: end of the 2023 season.
Source: jleague.co

=== Clean sheets ===
The list is sorted by shirt number when total clean sheets are equal.

Rnk	No.	Player	J2	EC	Total
1	31	(Japan) Shuhei Shikano	4	0	4
1	21	(Japan) Toru Takagiwa	4	0	4
3	1	(Japan) Kengo Tanaka	1	0	1
TOTALS			9	0	9

Last updated: end of the 2023 season.
Source: fbref.com
