= J.League Best XI =

Best players in Japan Football League

The J.League Best XI is an acknowledgement of the best eleven players in J.League.

== J1 League (1993–present) ==
Season	Goalkeeper (GK)	Defenders (DF)	Midfielders (MF)	Forwards (FW)	Ref
1993	(Japan) Shigetatsu Matsunaga (Yokohama Marinos)	(Japan) Shunzo Ono (Kashima Antlers) (Japan) Tetsuji Hashiratani (Verdy Kawasaki) (Brazil) Pereira (Verdy Kawasaki) (Japan) Masami Ihara (Yokohama Marinos) (Japan) Takumi Horiike (Shimizu S-Pulse)	(Brazil) Santos (Kashima Antlers) (Japan) Yasuto Honda (Kashima Antlers) (Japan) Ruy Ramos (Verdy Kawasaki)	(Japan) Kazuyoshi Miura (Verdy Kawasaki) (Argentina) Ramón Díaz (Yokohama Marinos)	
1994	(Japan) Shinkichi Kikuchi (Verdy Kawasaki)	(Brazil) Pereira (Verdy Kawasaki) (Japan) Masami Ihara (Yokohama Marinos) (Japan) Yoshihiro Natsuka (Bellmare Hiratsuka)	(Japan) Tetsuji Hashiratani (Verdy Kawasaki) (Brazil) Bismarck (Verdy Kawasaki) (Japan) Tsuyoshi Kitazawa (Verdy Kawasaki) (Japan) Ruy Ramos (Verdy Kawasaki) (Brazil) Betinho (Bellmare Hiratsuka)	(Japan) Nobuhiro Takeda (Verdy Kawasaki) (Japan) Takuya Takagi (Sanfrecce Hiroshima)	
1995	(Japan) Shinkichi Kikuchi (Verdy Kawasaki)	(Japan) Naoki Soma (Kashima Antlers) (Japan) Masami Ihara (Yokohama Marinos) (Japan) Masaharu Suzuki (Yokohama Marinos) (Germany) Guido Buchwald (Urawa Red Diamonds)	(Brazil) Bismarck (Verdy Kawasaki) (Japan) Tetsuji Hashiratani (Verdy Kawasaki)	(Japan) Masahiro Fukuda (Urawa Red Diamonds) (Japan) Kazuyoshi Miura (Verdy Kawasaki) (Socialist Federal Republic of Yugoslavia) Dragan Stojković (Nagoya Grampus Eight) (Japan) Hiroaki Morishima (Cerezo Osaka)	
1996	(Japan) Seigo Narazaki (Yokohama Flügels)	(Japan) Naoki Soma (Kashima Antlers) (Japan) Masami Ihara (Yokohama Marinos) (Germany) Guido Buchwald (Urawa Red Diamonds)	(Japan) Masakiyo Maezono (Yokohama Flügels) (Japan) Motohiro Yamaguchi (Yokohama Flügels) (Brazil) Jorginho (Kashima Antlers) (Japan) Hiroshi Nanami (Júbilo Iwata)	(Japan) Masayuki Okano (Urawa Red Diamonds) (Japan) Kazuyoshi Miura (Verdy Kawasaki) (Socialist Federal Republic of Yugoslavia) Dragan Stojković (Nagoya Grampus Eight)	
1997	(Japan) Tomoaki Ōgami (Júbilo Iwata)	(Japan) Yutaka Akita (Kashima Antlers) (Japan) Masami Ihara (Yokohama Marinos) (Japan) Naoki Soma (Kashima Antlers)	(Japan) Hiroshi Nanami (Júbilo Iwata) (Brazil) Bismarck (Kashima Antlers) (Japan) Motohiro Yamaguchi (Yokohama Flügels) (Brazil) Dunga (Júbilo Iwata) (Japan) Hidetoshi Nakata (Bellmare Hiratsuka)	(Cameroon) Patrick Mboma (Gamba Osaka) (Japan) Masashi Nakayama (Júbilo Iwata)	
1998	(Japan) Seigo Narazaki (Yokohama Flügels)	(Japan) Makoto Tanaka (Júbilo Iwata) (Japan) Naoki Soma (Kashima Antlers) (Japan) Yutaka Akita (Kashima Antlers)	(Japan) Shinji Ono (Urawa Red Diamonds) (Japan) Toshiya Fujita (Júbilo Iwata) (Japan) Hiroshi Nanami (Júbilo Iwata) (Brazil) Dunga (Júbilo Iwata) (Japan) Daisuke Oku (Júbilo Iwata)	(Japan) Atsushi Yanagisawa (Kashima Antlers) (Japan) Masashi Nakayama (Júbilo Iwata)	
1999	(Japan) Masanori Sanada (Shimizu S-Pulse)	(Japan) Toshihide Saito (Shimizu S-Pulse) (Japan) Yuji Nakazawa (Verdy Kawasaki) (Japan) Ryuzo Morioka (Shimizu S-Pulse)	(Japan) Takashi Fukunishi (Júbilo Iwata) (Japan) Shunsuke Nakamura (Yokohama F. Marinos) (Brazil) Alex (Shimizu S-Pulse) (Japan) Masaaki Sawanobori (Shimizu S-Pulse) (Japan) Teruyoshi Ito (Shimizu S-Pulse)	(South Korea) Hwang Sun-hong (Kashiwa Reysol) (Socialist Federal Republic of Yugoslavia) Dragan Stojković (Nagoya Grampus Eight)	
2000	(Japan) Daijiro Takakuwa (Kashima Antlers)	(South Korea) Hong Myung-bo (Kashiwa Reysol) (Japan) Yutaka Akita (Kashima Antlers) (Japan) Naoki Matsuda (Yokohama F. Marinos)	(Japan) Hiroaki Morishima (Cerezo Osaka) (Japan) Shunsuke Nakamura (Yokohama F. Marinos) (Japan) Tomokazu Myojin (Kashiwa Reysol) (Japan) Junichi Inamoto (Gamba Osaka)	(Japan) Akinori Nishizawa (Cerezo Osaka) (Japan) Masashi Nakayama (Júbilo Iwata) (Brazil) Tuto (FC Tokyo)	
2001	(Netherlands) Arno van Zwam (Júbilo Iwata)	(Japan) Go Oiwa (Júbilo Iwata) (Japan) Akira Narahashi (Kashima Antlers) (Japan) Yutaka Akita (Kashima Antlers)	(Japan) Mitsuo Ogasawara (Kashima Antlers) (Japan) Takashi Fukunishi (Júbilo Iwata) (Japan) Toshiya Fujita (Júbilo Iwata) (Japan) Toshihiro Hattori (Júbilo Iwata) (Japan) Kōji Nakata (Kashima Antlers)	(Brazil) Will (Consadole Sapporo) (Japan) Atsushi Yanagisawa (Kashima Antlers)	
2002	(Japan) Hitoshi Sogahata (Kashima Antlers)	(Japan) Hideto Suzuki (Júbilo Iwata) (Japan) Makoto Tanaka (Júbilo Iwata) (Japan) Naoki Matsuda (Yokohama F. Marinos)	(Japan) Mitsuo Ogasawara (Kashima Antlers) (Japan) Hiroshi Nanami (Júbilo Iwata) (Japan) Takashi Fukunishi (Júbilo Iwata) (Japan) Toshiya Fujita (Júbilo Iwata)	(Brazil) Emerson (Urawa Red Diamonds) (Japan) Masashi Nakayama (Júbilo Iwata) (Japan) Naohiro Takahara (Júbilo Iwata)	
2003	(Japan) Seigo Narazaki (Nagoya Grampus Eight)	(Japan) Keisuke Tsuboi (Urawa Red Diamonds) (Brazil) Dutra (Yokohama F. Marinos) (Japan) Yuji Nakazawa (Yokohama F. Marinos)	(Japan) Daisuke Oku (Júbilo Iwata) (Japan) Takashi Fukunishi (Júbilo Iwata) (Japan) Mitsuo Ogasawara (Kashima Antlers) (Japan) Yasuhito Endō (Gamba Osaka)	(Brazil) Emerson (Urawa Red Diamonds) (Japan) Tatsuhiko Kubo (Yokohama F. Marinos) (Brazil) Ueslei (Nagoya Grampus Eight)	
2004	(Japan) Yoichi Doi (FC Tokyo)	(Japan) Marcus Tulio Tanaka (Urawa Red Diamonds) (Brazil) Dutra (Yokohama F. Marinos) (Japan) Yuji Nakazawa (Yokohama F. Marinos)	(Japan) Makoto Hasebe (Urawa Red Diamonds) (Japan) Mitsuo Ogasawara (Kashima Antlers) (Japan) Daisuke Oku (Júbilo Iwata) (Japan) Yasuhito Endō (Gamba Osaka)	(Brazil) Emerson (Urawa Red Diamonds) (Japan) Masashi Oguro (Gamba Osaka) (Brazil) Marques (Nagoya Grampus Eight)	
2005	(Japan) Motohiro Yoshida (Cerezo Osaka)	(Bulgaria) Ilian Stoyanov (JEF United Chiba) (Japan) Yuji Nakazawa (Yokohama F. Marinos) (Japan) Marcus Tulio Tanaka (Urawa Red Diamonds)	(Japan) Yuki Abe (JEF United Chiba) (Japan) Mitsuo Ogasawara (Kashima Antlers) (Japan) Yasuhito Endō (Gamba Osaka) (Brazil) Fernandinho (Gamba Osaka) (Japan) Tatsuya Furuhashi (Cerezo Osaka)	(Japan) Hisato Satō (Sanfrecce Hiroshima) (Brazil) Araújo (Gamba Osaka)	
2006	(Japan) Yoshikatsu Kawaguchi (Júbilo Iwata)	(Japan) Akira Kaji (Gamba Osaka) (Japan) Satoshi Yamaguchi (Gamba Osaka) (Japan) Marcus Tulio Tanaka (Urawa Red Diamonds)	(Japan) Keita Suzuki (Urawa Red Diamonds) (Japan) Yuki Abe (JEF United Chiba) (Japan) Yasuhito Endō (Gamba Osaka) (Japan) Kengo Nakamura (Kawasaki Frontale) (Japan) Hiroyuki Taniguchi (Kawasaki Frontale)	(Brazil) Washington (Urawa Red Diamonds) (Brazil) Magno Alves (Gamba Osaka)	
2007	(Japan) Ryōta Tsuzuki (Urawa Red Diamonds)	(Japan) Daiki Iwamasa (Kashima Antlers) (Japan) Marcus Tulio Tanaka (Urawa Red Diamonds) (Japan) Satoshi Yamaguchi (Gamba Osaka)	(Japan) Yuki Abe (Urawa Red Diamonds) (Japan) Keita Suzuki (Urawa Red Diamonds) (Japan) Yasuhito Endō (Gamba Osaka) (Brazil) Robson Ponte (Urawa Red Diamonds) (Japan) Kengo Nakamura (Kawasaki Frontale)	(Brazil) Juniho (Kawasaki Frontale) (Brazil) Baré (Gamba Osaka)	
2008	(Japan) Seigo Narazaki (Nagoya Grampus)	(Japan) Atsuto Uchida (Kashima Antlers) (Japan) Yuji Nakazawa (Yokohama F. Marinos) (Japan) Marcus Tulio Tanaka (Urawa Red Diamonds) (Japan) Daiki Iwamasa (Kashima Antlers) (Japan) Satoshi Yamaguchi (Gamba Osaka)	(Japan) Yoshizumi Ogawa (Nagoya Grampus) (Japan) Yasuhito Endō (Gamba Osaka) (Japan) Kengo Nakamura (Kawasaki Frontale)	(Brazil) Marquinhos (Kashima Antlers) (Japan) Atsushi Yanagisawa (Kyoto Sanga)	
2009	(Japan) Eiji Kawashima (Kawasaki Frontale)	(Japan) Yuto Nagatomo (FC Tokyo) (Japan) Marcus Tulio Tanaka (Urawa Red Diamonds) (Japan) Atsuto Uchida (Kashima Antlers) (Japan) Daiki Iwamasa (Kashima Antlers)	(Japan) Naohiro Ishikawa (FC Tokyo) (Japan) Mitsuo Ogasawara (Kashima Antlers) (Japan) Yasuhito Endō (Gamba Osaka) (Japan) Kengo Nakamura (Kawasaki Frontale)	(Japan) Ryoichi Maeda (Júbilo Iwata) (Japan) Shinji Okazaki (Shimizu S-Pulse)	
2010	(Japan) Seigo Narazaki (Nagoya Grampus)	(Japan) Tomoaki Makino (Sanfrecce Hiroshima) (Japan) Marcus Tulio Tanaka (Nagoya Grampus) (Japan) Takahiro Masukawa (Nagoya Grampus)	(Colombia) Danilson Córdoba (Nagoya Grampus) (Brazil) Márcio Richardes (Albirex Niigata) (Japan) Jungo Fujimoto (Shimizu S-Pulse) (Japan) Yasuhito Endō (Gamba Osaka) (Japan) Kengo Nakamura (Kawasaki Frontale)	(Japan) Ryoichi Maeda (Júbilo Iwata) (Australia) Joshua Kennedy (Nagoya Grampus)	
2011	(Japan) Seigo Narazaki (Nagoya Grampus)	(Japan) Naoya Kondo (Kashiwa Reysol) (Japan) Hiroki Sakai (Kashiwa Reysol) (Japan) Marcus Tulio Tanaka (Nagoya Grampus)	(Japan) Hiroshi Kiyotake (Cerezo Osaka) (Brazil) Jorge Wagner (Kashiwa Reysol) (Japan) Yasuhito Endō (Gamba Osaka) (Brazil) Leandro Domingues (Kashiwa Reysol) (Japan) Jungo Fujimoto (Nagoya Grampus)	(Australia) Joshua Kennedy (Nagoya Grampus) (Japan) Mike Havenaar (Ventforet Kofu)	
2012	(Japan) Shusaku Nishikawa (Sanfrecce Hiroshima)	(Japan) Hiroki Mizumoto (Sanfrecce Hiroshima) (Japan) Yūichi Komano (Júbilo Iwata) (Japan) Marcus Tulio Tanaka (Nagoya Grampus)	(Japan) Toshihiro Aoyama (Sanfrecce Hiroshima) (Brazil) Leandro Domingues (Kashiwa Reysol) (Japan) Yasuhito Endō (Gamba Osaka) (Japan) Yojiro Takahagi (Sanfrecce Hiroshima)	(Japan) Yohei Toyoda (Sagan Tosu) (Japan) Hisato Satō (Sanfrecce Hiroshima) (Brazil) Wilson (Vegalta Sendai)	
2013	(Japan) Shusaku Nishikawa (Sanfrecce Hiroshima)	(Japan) Masato Morishige (FC Tokyo) (Japan) Daisuke Nasu (Urawa Red Diamonds) (Japan) Yuji Nakazawa (Yokohama F. Marinos)	(Japan) Yoichiro Kakitani (Cerezo Osaka) (Japan) Toshihiro Aoyama (Sanfrecce Hiroshima) (Japan) Hotaru Yamaguchi (Cerezo Osaka) (Japan) Shunsuke Nakamura (Yokohama F. Marinos)	(Japan) Yuya Osako (Kashima Antlers) (Japan) Kengo Kawamata (Albirex Niigata) (Japan) Yoshito Ōkubo (Kawasaki Frontale)	
2014	(Japan) Shusaku Nishikawa (Urawa Red Diamonds)	(Japan) Kosuke Ota (FC Tokyo) (Japan) Masato Morishige (FC Tokyo) (Japan) Tsukasa Shiotani (Sanfrecce Hiroshima)	(Japan) Yoshinori Muto (FC Tokyo) (Brazil) Léo Silva (Albirex Niigata) (Japan) Yasuhito Endō (Gamba Osaka) (Japan) Gaku Shibasaki (Kashima Antlers)	(Brazil) Patric (Gamba Osaka) (Japan) Takashi Usami (Gamba Osaka) (Japan) Yoshito Ōkubo (Kawasaki Frontale)	
2015	(Japan) Shusaku Nishikawa (Urawa Red Diamonds)	(Japan) Tomoaki Makino (Urawa Red Diamonds) (Japan) Kosuke Ota (FC Tokyo) (Japan) Masato Morishige (FC Tokyo) (Japan) Tsukasa Shiotani (Sanfrecce Hiroshima)	(Japan) Mu Kanazaki (Kashima Antlers) (Japan) Yasuhito Endō (Gamba Osaka) (Japan) Toshihiro Aoyama (Sanfrecce Hiroshima)	(Japan) Yoshito Ōkubo (Kawasaki Frontale) (Japan) Takashi Usami (Gamba Osaka) (Brazil) Douglas (Sanfrecce Hiroshima)	
2016	(Japan) Shusaku Nishikawa (Urawa Red Diamonds)	(Japan) Tomoaki Makino (Urawa Red Diamonds) (Japan) Gen Shoji (Kashima Antlers) (Japan) Masato Morishige (FC Tokyo) (Japan) Tsukasa Shiotani (Sanfrecce Hiroshima)	(Japan) Yuki Abe (Urawa Red Diamonds) (Japan) Manabu Saitō (Yokohama F. Marinos) (Japan) Yōsuke Kashiwagi (Urawa Red Diamonds) (Japan) Kengo Nakamura (Kawasaki Frontale)	(Japan) Yū Kobayashi (Kawasaki Frontale) (Brazil) Leandro (Vissel Kobe)	
2017	(Japan) Kosuke Nakamura (Kashiwa Reysol)	(Japan) Shintaro Kurumaya (Kawasaki Frontale) (Japan) Gen Shoji (Kashima Antlers) (Brazil) Elsinho (Kawasaki Frontale) (Japan) Daigo Nishi (Kashima Antlers)	(Japan) Hotaru Yamaguchi (Cerezo Osaka) (Japan) Yosuke Ideguchi (Gamba Osaka) (Japan) Kengo Nakamura (Kawasaki Frontale)	(Japan) Yū Kobayashi (Kawasaki Frontale) (Japan) Shinzo Koroki (Urawa Red Diamonds) (Japan) Kenyu Sugimoto (Cerezo Osaka)	
2018	(South Korea) Jung Sung-ryong (Kawasaki Frontale)	(Japan) Daigo Nishi (Kashima Antlers) (Brazil) Elsinho (Kawasaki Frontale) (Japan) Shintaro Kurumaya (Kawasaki Frontale) (Japan) Shogo Taniguchi (Kawasaki Frontale)	(Thailand) Chanathip Songkrasin (Consadole Sapporo) (Japan) Akihiro Ienaga (Kawasaki Frontale) (Japan) Ryota Oshima (Kawasaki Frontale) (Japan) Kengo Nakamura (Kawasaki Frontale)	(Brazil) Jô (Nagoya Grampus) (South Korea) Hwang Ui-jo (Gamba Osaka)	
2019	(Japan) Akihiro Hayashi (FC Tokyo)	(Japan) Sei Muroya (FC Tokyo) (Brazil) Thiago Martins (Yokohama F. Marinos) (Japan) Masato Morishige (FC Tokyo)	(Japan) Takuya Kida (Yokohama F. Marinos) (Japan) Kento Hashimoto (FC Tokyo) (Spain) Andrés Iniesta (Vissel Kobe) (Japan) Teruhito Nakagawa (Yokohama F. Marinos)	(Brazil) Marcos Júnior (Yokohama F. Marinos) (Brazil) Diego Oliveira (FC Tokyo) (Japan) Kensuke Nagai (FC Tokyo)	
2020	(South Korea) Jung Sung-ryong (Kawasaki Frontale)	(Japan) Miki Yamane (Kawasaki Frontale) (Japan) Shogo Taniguchi (Kawasaki Frontale) (Brazil) Jesiel (Kawasaki Frontale) (Japan) Kyohei Noborizato (Kawasaki Frontale)	(Japan) Akihiro Ienaga (Kawasaki Frontale) (Japan) Ao Tanaka (Kawasaki Frontale) (Japan) Hidemasa Morita (Kawasaki Frontale) (Japan) Kaoru Mitoma (Kawasaki Frontale)	(Brazil) Everaldo (Kashima Antlers) (Kenya) Michael Olunga (Kashiwa Reysol)	
2021	(Australia) Mitchell Langerak (Nagoya Grampus)	(Japan) Miki Yamane (Kawasaki Frontale) (Japan) Shogo Taniguchi (Kawasaki Frontale) (Brazil) Jesiel (Kawasaki Frontale)	(Japan) Akihiro Ienaga (Kawasaki Frontale) (Japan) Yasuto Wakizaka (Kawasaki Frontale) (Spain) Andrés Iniesta (Vissel Kobe) (Japan) Sho Inagaki (Nagoya Grampus)	(Brazil) Leandro Damião (Kawasaki Frontale) (Japan) Reo Hatate (Kawasaki Frontale) (Japan) Daizen Maeda (Yokohama F. Marinos)	
2022	(Japan) Yohei Takaoka (Yokohama F. Marinos)	(Japan) Miki Yamane (Kawasaki Frontale) (Japan) Shogo Taniguchi (Kawasaki Frontale) (Japan) Tomoki Iwata (Yokohama F. Marinos) (Japan) Ryuta Koike (Yokohama F. Marinos)	(Japan) Akihiro Ienaga (Kawasaki Frontale) (Japan) Yasuto Wakizaka (Kawasaki Frontale) (Japan) Kota Mizunuma (Yokohama F. Marinos)	(Brazil) Marcinho (Kawasaki Frontale) (Brazil) Thiago Santana (Shimizu S-Pulse) (Brazil) Élber (Yokohama F. Marinos)	
2023	(Japan) Shusaku Nishikawa (Urawa Red Diamonds)	(Denmark) Alexander Scholz (Urawa Red Diamonds) (Norway) Marius Høibråten (Urawa Red Diamonds) (Japan) Seiya Maikuma (Cerezo Osaka) (Japan) Gōtoku Sakai (Vissel Kobe)	(Japan) Atsuki Ito (Urawa Red Diamonds) (Japan) Yasuto Wakizaka (Kawasaki Frontale) (Japan) Hotaru Yamaguchi (Vissel Kobe)	(Brazil) Anderson Lopes (Yokohama F. Marinos) (Japan) Yuya Osako (Vissel Kobe) (Japan) Yoshinori Muto (Vissel Kobe)	
2024	(Japan) Keisuke Osako (Sanfrecce Hiroshima)	(Japan) Kimito Nono (Kashima Antlers) (Japan) Shinnosuke Nakatani (Gamba Osaka) (Brazil) Matheus Thuler (Vissel Kobe) (Japan) Sho Sasaki (Sanfrecce Hiroshima)	(Brazil) Matheus Sávio (Kashiwa Reysol)	(Brazil) Anderson Lopes (Yokohama F. Marinos) (Japan) Yuya Osako (Vissel Kobe) (Japan) Yoshinori Muto (Vissel Kobe) (Japan) Takashi Usami (Gamba Osaka) (Japan) Kei Chinen (Kashima Antlers)	
2025	(Japan) Tomoki Hayakawa (Kashima Antlers)	(Japan) Naomichi Ueda (Kashima Antlers) (Japan) Taiyo Koga (Kashiwa Reysol) (Japan) Hayato Araki (Sanfrecce Hiroshima)	(Japan) Yoshio Koizumi (Kashiwa Reysol) (Japan) Sho Inagaki (Nagoya Grampus) (Japan) Satoshi Tanaka (Sanfrecce Hiroshima)	(Brazil) Léo Ceará (Kashima Antlers) (Japan) Yuki Soma (Machida Zelvia) (Japan) Tatsuya Ito (Kawasaki Frontale) (Brazil) Rafael Elias (Kyoto Sanga)	

=== Multiple appearances ===
N°	Player	Clubs	Years
12	Yasuhito Endō	Gamba Osaka	2003–2012, 2014–2015
9	Marcus Tulio Tanaka	Urawa Red Diamonds, Nagoya Grampus	2004–2012
8	Kengo Nakamura	Kawasaki Frontale	2006–2010, 2016–2018
6	Mitsuo Ogasawara	Kashima Antlers	2001–2005, 2009
6	Seigo Narazaki	Yokohama Flügels, Nagoya Grampus	1996, 1998, 2003, 2008, 2010–2011
6	Yuji Nakazawa	Tokyo Verdy, Yokohama F. Marinos	1999, 2003–2005, 2008, 2013
6	Shusaku Nishikawa	Sanfrecce Hiroshima, Urawa Red Diamonds	2012–2016, 2023
5	Masami Ihara	Yokohama F. Marinos	1993–1997
5	Masato Morishige	FC Tokyo	2013–2016, 2019
4	Yutaka Akita	Kashima Antlers	1997–1998, 2000–2001
4	Naoki Soma	Kashima Antlers	1995–1998
4	Hiroshi Nanami	Júbilo Iwata	1996–1998, 2002
4	Masashi Nakayama	Júbilo Iwata	1997–1998, 2000, 2002
4	Takashi Fukunishi	Júbilo Iwata	1999, 2001–2003
4	Yuki Abe	JEF United Chiba, Urawa Red Diamonds	2005-2007, 2016
4	Akihiro Ienaga	Kawasaki Frontale	2018, 2020-2022
4	Shogo Taniguchi	Kawasaki Frontale	2018, 2020-2022

=== Appearances by club ===
Team	GK	DF	MF	FW	Total
Consadole Sapporo	0	0	1	1	2
Vegalta Sendai	0	0	0	1	1
Kashima Antlers	3	21	13	7	44
Urawa Red Diamonds	5	14	9	7	35
JEF United Chiba	0	1	2	0	3
Kashiwa Reysol	1	5	7	1	14
FC Tokyo	2	9	3	3	17
Tokyo Verdy	2	4	7	4	17
Kawasaki Frontale	3	14	20	10	47
Yokohama (F.) Marinos	2	18	8	8	36
Shonan Bellmare	0	1	2	0	3
Ventforet Kofu	0	0	0	1	1
Albirex Niigata	0	0	2	1	3
Shimizu S-Pulse	1	3	4	2	10
Júbilo Iwata	3	5	15	7	30
Nagoya Grampus	5	4	6	8	23
Kyoto Sanga	0	0	0	3	3
Gamba Osaka	0	5	15	10	30
Cerezo Osaka	1	1	6	4	12
Vissel Kobe	0	2	3	5	10
Sanfrecce Hiroshima	3	8	6	4	21
Sagan Tosu	0	0	0	1	1
Yokohama Flügels	2	0	3	0	5
FC Machida Zelvia	0	0	0	2	2

=== Appearances by country ===
N°	Country
284	Japan
55	Brazil
5	South Korea
3	Australia
3	(Socialist Federal Republic of Yugoslavia) Yugoslavia
2	Spain
2	Germany
1	Argentina
1	Bulgaria
1	Cameroon
1	Colombia
1	Kenya
1	Netherlands
1	Thailand
1	Norway
1	Denmark

- Only on two occasions there has been a full-Japanese Best XI (2009 and 2013).

== J2 League (2022–present) ==
Season	Goalkeeper (GK)	Defenders (DF)	Midfielders (MF)	Forwards (FW)	Ref
2022	(Japan) Ryosuke Kojima (Albirex Niigata)	(Japan) Yuto Horigome (Albirex Niigata) (Netherlands) Jordy Buijs (Fagiano Okayama) (Japan) Michael Fitzgerald (Albirex Niigata)	(Japan) So Kawahara (Roasso Kumamoto) (Japan) Yoshiaki Takagi (Albirex Niigata) (Japan) Takahiro Ko (Albirex Niigata) (Japan) Ryotaro Ito (Albirex Niigata) (Japan) Tatsuya Hasegawa (Yokohama FC)	(Japan) Toshiki Takahashi (Roasso Kumamoto) (Japan) Koki Ogawa (Yokohama FC)	
2023	(Japan) Shūichi Gonda (Shimizu S-Pulse)	(Japan) Kazuya Miyahara (Tokyo Verdy); (Japan) Yoshinori Suzuki (Shimizu S-Pulse); (Brazil) Ricardo Graça (Júbilo Iwata)	(Japan) Taishi Taguchi (JEF United Chiba); (Japan) Koki Morita (Tokyo Verdy); (Japan) Takashi Inui (Shimizu S-Pulse); (Japan) Rei Hirakawa (Roasso Kumamoto)	(Japan) Hiiro Komori (JEF United Chiba); (Brazil) Erik (FC Machida Zelvia); (Spain) Juanma (V-Varen Nagasaki)	
2024	(Germany) Svend Brodersen (Fagiano Okayama)	(Japan) Akito Fukumori (Yokohama FC); (Japan) Boniface Nduka (Yokohama FC); (United States) Jelani Reshaun Sumiyoshi (Shimizu S-Pulse); (Japan) Reon Yamahara (Shimizu S-Pulse)	(Brazil) Yuri Lara (Yokohama FC); (Japan) Takashi Inui (Shimizu S-Pulse); (Brazil) Matheus Jesus (V-Varen Nagasaki)	(Japan) Kaina Tanimura (Iwaki FC); (Japan) Hiiro Komori (JEF United Chiba); (Japan) Kazuki Tanaka (JEF United Chiba)	
2025	(Japan) Hayate Tanaka (Tokushima Vortis)	(Japan) Takahiro Iida (Mito HollyHock); (Japan) Sho Omori (Mito HollyHock); (Japan) Rion Ichihara (RB Omiya Ardija); (Japan) Nao Yamada (Tokushima Vortis)	(Japan) Tomoki Takamine (Hokkaido Consadole Sapporo); (Japan) Shunsuke Saito (Mito HollyHock); (Brazil) Matheus Jesus (V-Varen Nagasaki); (Japan) Hotaru Yamaguchi (V-Varen Nagasaki)	(Japan) Arata Watanabe (Mito HollyHock); (Brazil) Marcus Índio (FC Imabari)	

== J3 League (2022–present) ==
Season	Goalkeeper (GK)	Defenders (DF)	Midfielders (MF)	Forwards (FW)	Ref
2022	(Japan) Kei Uchiyama (Fujieda MYFC)	(Japan) Rei Ieizumi (Iwaki FC) (Japan) Makoto Rindo (Kataller Toyama) (Japan) Tomoya Ando (FC Imabari) (Japan) Kenta Hirose (Kagoshima United)	(Japan) Riku Saga (Iwaki FC) (Japan) Masaru Hidaka (Iwaki FC) (Japan) Yuto Yamashita (Iwaki FC) (Japan) Akiyuki Yokoyama (Fujieda MYFC)	(Japan) Koki Arita (Kagoshima United) (Japan) Ryo Arita (Iwaki FC)	
2023	(Japan) Shugo Tsuji (Ehime FC)	(Japan) Sora Ogawa (Ehime FC); (Japan) Reiya Morishita (Ehime FC); (Japan) Hayato Teruyama (FC Imabari)	(Japan) Yusuke Kikui (Matsumoto Yamaga); (Japan) Shunsuke Tanimoto (Ehime FC); (Japan) Shunsuke Motegi (Ehime FC)	(Japan) Ren Komatsu (Matsumoto Yamaga); (Japan) Hayato Asakawa (Nara Club); (Japan) Riki Matsuda (Ehime FC); (Brazil) Marcus Índio (FC Imabari)	
2024	(Japan) Takashi Kasahara (Omiya Ardija)	(Japan) Rion Ichihara (Omiya Ardija); (Japan) Niki Urakami (Omiya Ardija); (Japan) Ryota Ichihara (FC Imabari)	(Japan) Yuto Ozeki (Fukushima United FC); (Japan) Toya Izumi (Omiya Ardija); (Japan) Masato Kojima (Omiya Ardija)	(Japan) Ryo Shiohama (Fukushima United FC); (Japan) Kenyu Sugimoto (Omiya Ardija); (Japan) Kosuke Fujioka (FC Gifu); (Brazil) Marcus Índio (FC Imabari)	
2025	(Japan) Shogo Onishi (Vanraure Hachinohe)	(Japan) Kodai Minoda (Vanraure Hachinohe); (Croatia) Matej Jonjić (Tochigi City FC); (Japan) Yuma Tsujioka (Giravanz Kitakyushu)	(Japan) Kanta Jojo (Fukushima United FC); (Japan) Yuki Okaniwa (Tochigi City FC); (Japan) Kazuki Nishiya (Zweigen Kanazawa); (Japan) Koji Okumura (Tegevajaro Miyazaki)	(Japan) Ryuji Sawakami (Vanraure Hachinohe); (Japan) Paulo Junichi Tanaka (Tochigi City FC); (Japan) Keigo Hashimoto (Tegevajaro Miyazaki)	

== J.League 20th Anniversary Team ==
Goalkeeper (GK)	Defenders (DF)	Midfielders (MF)	Forwards (FW)	Ref
(Japan) Yoshikatsu Kawaguchi	(Japan) Naoki Matsuda (Japan) Yuji Nakazawa (Japan) Masami Ihara	(Japan) Yasuhito Endō (Japan) Hidetoshi Nakata (Japan) Shunsuke Nakamura (Japan) Hiroshi Nanami	(Japan) Kazuyoshi Miura (Japan) Masashi Nakayama (Socialist Federal Republic of Yugoslavia) Dragan Stojković	

== J.League 30th Anniversary Team ==
Goalkeeper (GK)	Defenders (DF)	Midfielders (MF)	Forwards (FW)	Ref
(Japan) Yoshikatsu Kawaguchi	(Japan) Naoki Matsuda (Japan) Yuji Nakazawa (Japan) Masami Ihara (Japan) Marcus Tulio Tanaka (Japan) Atsuto Uchida	(Japan) Yasuhito Endō (MVP) (Japan) Shinji Ono (Japan) Shunsuke Nakamura (Japan) Kengo Nakamura	(Japan) Kazuyoshi Miura	

== See also ==
- J.League awards
- J.League Player of the Year
- J.League Top Scorer
- J.League Rookie of the Year
- J.League Manager of the Year
