= 2015 All Japan High School Soccer Tournament =

Tournament details
- Country: Japan
- Dates: 30 December 2015 – 11 January 2016
- Teams: 48

Final positions
- Champions: Higashi Fukuoka High School (1st title)
- Runner-up: Kokugakuin Kugayama High School

Tournament statistics
- Top goal scorer(s): Mitsuki Murakami (Teikyo Daisan, 5 goals)

The 2015 All Japan High School Soccer Tournament (All Japan JFA 94th High School Soccer Tournament (Japanese: 第94回全国高等学校サッカー選手権大会) marked the 94th edition of the referred annually contested cup for High Schools over Japan.

== Calendar ==
Round	Date	Matches	Teams
First round	30–31 December 2015	16	32 (32) → 16
Second round	2 January 2016	16	32 (16+16) → 16
Third round	3 January 2016	8	16 → 8
Quarter-finals	5 January 2016	4	8 → 4
Semi-finals	9 January 2016	2	4 → 2
Final	11 January 2016	1	2 → 1

== Venues ==
The tournament was played in four prefectures and nine stadiums, with six (two for each prefecture) located in Chiba, Kanagawa, and Tokyo Prefectures, and three located in Saitama. They are:

- Tokyo – Ajinomoto Field Nishigaoka, and Komazawa Olympic Park Stadium
- Saitama – Saitama Stadium 2002, Urawa Komaba Stadium and NACK5 Stadium Omiya
- Kanagawa – NHK Spring Mitsuzawa Football Stadium and Kawasaki Todoroki Stadium
- Chiba – Fukuda Denshi Arena and ZA Oripri Stadium

== Participating clubs ==
In parentheses: the amount of times each team qualified for the All Japan High School Tournament (appearance in the 2015 edition included)

Hokkaido: Sapporo Otani High School (2); Aomori: Aomori Yamada High School (21); Iwate: Tono High School (25); Akita: Akita Shogyo High School (41); Miyagi: Seiwa Gakuen High School (3); Yamagata: Nihon Univ. Yamagata High School (13); Fukushima: Shoshi High School (7); Ibaraki: Meishu Gakuen Hitachi High School (1); Tochigi: Yaita Chuo High School (7); Gunma: Maebashi Ikuei High School (19); Saitama: Shochi Fukaya High School (2); Chiba: Ichiritsu Funabashi High School (20); Tokyo A: Kokugakuin Univ. Kugayama High School (7); Tokyo B: Komazawa Univ. High School (2); Kanagawa: Toko Gakuen High School (9); Niigata: Niigata Meikun High School (6); Nagano: Tokyo City Univ. Shiojiri High School (4); Yamanashi: Teikyo Daisan High School (10); Toyama: Toyama Daiichi High School (26); Ishikawa: Seiryo High School (26); Fukui: Maruoka High School (28); Gifu: Kakamihara High School (4); Shizuoka: Fujieda Higashi High School (25); Aichi: Chukyo Univ. Chukyo High School (15)	Mie: Yokkaichi Chuo Kogyo High School (32); Shiga: Yasu High School (9); Kyoto: Kyoto Tachibana High School (5); Osaka: Hannan University High School (1); Hyōgo: Kobe Koryo Gakuen High School (9); Nara: Kashiba High School (3); Wakayama: Hatsushiba Hashimoto High School (14); Tottori: Yonago Kita High School (11); Shimane: Taisha High School (9); Okayama: Tamano Konan High School (8); Hiroshima: Hiroshima Minami High School (12); Yamaguchi: Yamaguchi Kojo High School (1); Tokushima: Naruto High School (4); Kagawa: Takamatsu Minami High School (2); Ehime: Matsuyama Kogyo High School (5); Kōchi: Meitoku Gijuku High School (6); Fukuoka: Higashi Fukuoka High School (17); Saga: Saga Kita High School (7); Nagasaki: Nagasaki Nanzan High School (1); Kumamoto: Ohzu High School (16); Ōita: Oita High School (8); Miyazaki: Nissho Gakuen High School (12); Kagoshima: Kagoshima Josei High School (6); Okinawa: Naha Nishi High School (14)

== Schedule ==
=== First round ===
30 December 2015 Match 1	Komazawa	2–1	Hannan	Setagaya
14:05	Yuki Fukami 28'; Naoya Takegami 30'	Report (JFA); Report (JFA)	Sota Kidoguchi 61'	Stadium: Komazawa Olympic Park Stadium

31 December 2015 Match 2	Sapporo Otani	1–1 (5–4 p)	Kagoshima Josei	Saitama
12:05	Keisuke Saka 50'	Report (JFA); Report (JFA)	Hidetaka Nakamura 8'	Stadium: NACK5 Stadium Omiya

31 December 2015 Match 3	Chukyo	4–0	Hatsushiba Hashimoto	Saitama
14:10	Go Mizuguchi 31'; Sora Imura 54'; Daiki Fukuyama 56'; Hiroya Kato 68'	Report (JFA); Report (JFA)		Stadium: NACK5 Stadium Omiya

31 December 2015 Match 4	Fujieda Higashi	0–0 (3–4 p)	Kashiba	Saitama
14:10		Report (JFA); Report (JFA)		Stadium: Urawa Komaba Stadium

31 December 2015 Match 5	Kakamihara	1–0	Saga Kita	Saitama
12:05	Shunta Mori 67'	Report (JFA); Report (JFA)		Stadium: Urawa Komaba Stadium

31 December 2015 Match 6	Shoshi	1–0	Kyoto Tachibana	Setagaya
14:10	Seiya Mogi 13'	Report (JFA); Report (JFA)		Stadium: Komazawa Olympic Park Stadium

31 December 2015 Match 7	Niigata Meikun	2–0	Naha Nishi	Chiba
12:05	Masahiro Sekiguchi 74'; Daichi Tanabe 80'	Report (JFA); Report (JFA)		Stadium: Fukuda Denshi Arena

31 December 2015 Match 8	Tono	0–3	Higashi Fukuoka	Chiba
14:10		Report (JFA); Report (JFA)	Itsuki Oda 12'; Own goal 44'; Kaito Miyake 50'	Stadium: Fukuda Denshi Arena

31 December 2015 Match 9	Aomori Yamada	3–2	Taisha	Yokohama
12:05	Yuta Kamiya 39'; Issei Takahashi 56', 80+2'	Report (JFA); Report (JFA)	Chikahiro Kuwagaki 32', 37'	Stadium: NHK Spring Mitsuzawa Football Stadium

31 December 2015 Match 10	Seiwa Gakuen	7–1	Yasu	Yokohama
14:10	Mitsuru Tanida 13', 18'; Yoshihisa Koike 17'; Masaya Kenmotsu 47'; Kai Hatano 59'; Masaki Takeda 77'; Yuto Okuno 80+3'	Report (JFA); Report (JFA)	Own goal 49'	Stadium: NHK Spring Mitsuzawa Football Stadium

31 December 2015 Match 11	Akita Shogyo	0–1	Naruto	Kawasaki
12:05		Report (JFA); Report (JFA)	Kanku Marukawa 12'	Stadium: Kawasaki Todoroki Stadium

31 December 2015 Match 12	Yaita Chuo	2–1	Oita	Kawasaki
14:10	Himan Morimoto 52'; Mizuto Mashimo 80'	Report (JFA); Report (JFA)	Takeru Furuta 40'	Stadium: Kawasaki Todoroki Stadium

31 December 2015 Match 13	Kokugakuin Kugayama	1–0	Hiroshima Minami	Kita
12:05	Shun Uchioke 15'	Report (JFA); Report (JFA)		Stadium: Ajinomoto Field Nishigaoka

31 December 2015 Match 14	Meishu Hitachi	2–1	Yokkaichi Chuo Kogyo	Setagaya
12:05	Hikaru Honda 39'; Katsufumi Koiso 68'	Report (JFA); Report (JFA)	Hayate Kobayashi 19'	Stadium: Komazawa Olympic Park Stadium

31 December 2015 Match 15	Teikyo Daisan	3–0	Takamatsu Minami	Ichihara
12:05	Mitsuki Murakami 13', 35'	Report (JFA); Report (JFA)	Jun Yamamoto 49'	Stadium: ZA Oripri Stadium

31 December 2015 Match 16	Nihon Yamagata	0–0 (2–4 p)	Kojo	Ichihara
14:10		Report (JFA); Report (JFA)		Stadium: ZA Oripri Stadium

=== Second round ===
2 January 2015 Match 17	Seiryo	2–1	Tamano Konan	Saitama
12:05	Hiroshi Katayama 47'; Takaya Kato 73'	Report (JFA); Report (JFA)	Ryoki Ariyoshi 13'	Stadium: NACK5 Stadium Omiya

2 January 2015 Match 18	Sapporo Otani	0–3	Chukyo	Saitama
14:10		Report (JFA); Report (JFA)	Yuta Motoyama 4'; Sora Imura 12'; Seiya Tsuji 52'	Stadium: NACK5 Stadium Omiya

2 January 2015 Match 19	Kashiba	0–1	Kakamihara	Saitama
14:10		Report (JFA); Report (JFA)	So Goto 54'	Stadium: Urawa Komaba Stadium

2 January 2015 Match 20	Shochi Fukaya	0–1	Meitoku Gijuku	Saitama
12:05		Report (JFA); Report (JFA)	Ikuya Okazaki 10'	Stadium: Urawa Komaba Stadium

2 January 2015 Match 21	Maruoka	1–1 (1–4 p)	Matsuyama Kita	Setagaya
14:10	Taiki Serikawa 65'	Report (JFA); Report (JFA)	Yoshiaki Tokunaga 45'	Stadium: Komazawa Olympic Park Stadium

2 January 2015 Match 22	Komazawa	0–0 (3–0 p)	Shoshi	Setagaya
12:05		Report (JFA); Report (JFA)		Stadium: Komazawa Olympic Park Stadium

2 January 2015 Match 23	Niigata Meikun	1–3	Higashi Fukuoka	Ichihara
12:05	Ryotaro Nakamura 75'	Report (JFA); Report (JFA)	Daiki Mochiyama 34', 46', 67'	Stadium: ZA Oripri Stadium

2 January 2015 Match 24	Yonago Kita	0–3	Ichiritsu Funabashi	Chiba
12:05		Report (JFA); Report (JFA)	Daiki Sugioka 33'; Yuki Kudo 56'; Teruki Hara 71'	Stadium: Fukuda Denshi Arena

2 January 2015 Match 25	Toko Gakuen	3–0	Nagasaki Nanzan	Kawasaki
12:05	Koki Ogawa 49', 71'; Zain Issaka 53'	Report (JFA); Report (JFA)		Stadium: Kawasaki Todoroki Stadium

2 January 2015 Match 26	Aomori Yamada	5–0	Seiwa Gakuen	Kawasaki
14:10	Yuki Toyoshima 8'; Riku Saga 35'; Issei Takahashi 56'; Akito Narumi 63'; Yuta Kamiya 79'	Report (JFA); Report (JFA)		Stadium: Kawasaki Todoroki Stadium

2 January 2015 Match 27	Naruto	0–3	Yaita Chuo	Yokohama
12:05		Report (JFA); Report (JFA)	Hiroyuki Tsubokawa 1'; Takuya Hitomi 58', 68'	Stadium: NHK Spring Mitsuzawa Football Stadium

2 January 2015 Match 28	Toyama Daiichi	1–0	Nissho Gakuen	Yokohama
14:10	Yuki Sakamoto 28'	Report (JFA); Report (JFA)		Stadium: NHK Spring Mitsuzawa Football Stadium

2 January 2015 Match 29	TCU Shiojiri	0–1	Kobe Koryo Gakuen	Kita
12:05		Report (JFA); Report (JFA)	Fumiaki Takemura 66'	Stadium: Ajinomoto Field Nishigaoka

2 January 2015 Match 30	Kokugakuin Kugayama	2–2 (3–1 p)	Meishu Hitachi	Kita
12:05	Masaya Shibuya 62'	Report (JFA); Report (JFA)	Katsufumi Koiso 76'; Kaito Koike 80+4'	Stadium: Ajinomoto Field Nishigaoka

2 January 2015 Match 31	Teikyo Daisan	8–0	Kojo	Ichihara
14:10	Futa Hikima 6', 47'; Mitsuki Murakami 26', 34', 37'; Natsuki Yato 40+1'; Nachi Fujimoto 65', 69'	Report (JFA); Report (JFA)		Stadium: ZA Oripri Stadium

2 January 2015 Match 32	Ohzu	2–3	Maebashi Ikuei	Chiba
14:10	Kazunari Ichimi 21'; Rio Yoshitake 55'	Report (JFA); Report (JFA)	Seiji Sato 18', 44'; Takuya Baba 80+2'	Stadium: Fukuda Denshi Arena

=== Round of 16 ===
3 January 2015 Match 33	Seiryo	1–0	Chukyo	Saitama
12:05	Yuto Okada 44'	Report		Stadium: Urawa Komaba Stadium

3 January 2015 Match 34	Kakamihara	0–3	Meitoku Gijuku	Saitama
14:10		Report	Kishun Mitamura 79'; Sota Tsuchiya 80+2'; Riku Ota 80+2'	Stadium: Urawa Komaba Stadium

3 January 2015 Match 35	Matsuyama Kogyo	1–2	Komazawa	Setagaya
12:05	Keito Shima 43'	Report	Yota Sato 51'; Yusuke Kikuchi 68'	Stadium: Komazawa Olympic Park Stadium

3 January 2015 Match 36	Higashi Fukuoka	0–0 (4–3 p)	Ichiritsu Funabashi	Chiba
12:05		Report		Stadium: Fukuda Denshi Arena

3 January 2015 Match 37	Toko Gakuen	2–2 (4–5 p)	Aomori Yamada	Yokohama
14:10	Koki Ogawa 32', 43'	Report	Kento Narita 80+2'; Kai Yoshida 80+5'	Stadium: Nippatsu Mitsuzawa Stadium

3 January 2015 Match 38	Yaita Chuo	1–2	Toyama Daiichi	Yokohama
12:05	Mizuto Mashimo 15'	Report	Ryo Kata 50'; Joichiro Shibata 80+2'	Stadium: Nippatsu Mitsuzawa Stadium

3 January 2015 Match 39	Kobe Koryo Gakuen	1–2	Kokugakuin Kugayama	Setagaya
14:10	Tomoyuki Doi 41'	Report	Kazuki Kobayashi 39'; Masaya Shibuya 50'	Stadium: Komazawa Olympic Park Stadium

3 January 2015 Match 40	Teikyo Daisan	1–3	Maebashi Ikuei	Chiba
14:10	Daisuke Matsumoto 71'	Report	Kohei Yokozawa 25'; Tomoyasu Yoshida 50'; Takuya Baba 55'	Stadium: Fukuda Denshi Arena

=== Quarter-finals ===
5 January 2015 Match 41	Seiryo	3–0	Meitoku Gijuku	Setagaya
14:10	Masashi Abe 28', 54'; Takahiro Okura 40'	Report		Stadium: Komazawa Olympic Park Stadium

5 January 2015 Match 42	Komazawa	0–1	Higashi Fukuoka	Setagaya
12:05		Report	Kazuyuki Hashimoto 62'	Stadium: Komazawa Olympic Park Stadium

5 January 2015 Match 43	Aomori Yamada	1–0	Toyama Daiichi	Yokohama
12:05	Issei Takahashi 71'	Report		Stadium: Nippatsu Mitsuzawa Stadium

5 January 2015 Match 44	Kokugakuin Kugayama	1–0	Maebashi Ikuei	Yokohama
14:10	Shun Uchioke 52'	Report		Stadium: Nippatsu Mitsuzawa Stadium

=== Semi-finals ===
9 January 2015 Match 45	Seiryo	0–2	Higashi Fukuoka	Saitama
12:05	Kotaro Fujikawa 45'; Yuya Kuwasaki 57'	Report		Stadium: Saitama Stadium 2002

9 January 2015 Match 46	Aomori Yamada	1–2	Kokugakuin Kugayama	Saitama
14:20	Akito Narumi 17'	Report	Kyohei Nomura 25'; Keisuke Toda 90+3'	Stadium: Saitama Stadium 2002

=== Final ===
11 January 2015
14:05

Higashi Fukuoka	5−0	Kokugakuin Kugayama
Kaito Miyake 36'; Kento Nakamura 47', 80'; Daiki Mochiyama 67'; Kotaro Fujikawa 70'	Report (JFA); Report (JFA)

Saitama Stadium 2002, Saitama
Attendance: 54,090
Referee: Kazuyoshi Enomoto

GK	1	(Japan) Atsushi Wakino
DF	2	(Japan) Yuto Hayashi
DF	5	(Japan) Sota Fukuchi
DF	13	(Japan) Itsuki Oda
DF	15	(Japan) Shintaro Kodama
MF	4	(Japan) Yuya Kuwasaki
MF	6	(Japan) Kotaro Fujikawa
MF	8	(Japan) Kazuyuki Hashimoto	(substituted off) 90+2'
MF	10	(Japan) Kento Nakamura (c)
MF	11	(Japan) Kaito Miyake	(substituted off) 79'
FW	9	(Japan) Daiki Mochiyama	(substituted off) 86'
Substitutes:
GK	14	(Japan) Masaya Maeshima
DF	3	(Japan) Tatsuya Fukushige
DF	12	(Japan) Eiji Yamada
MF	18	(Japan) Mizuki Saburomaru
MF	23	(Japan) Kanta Ushijima
MF	24	(Japan) Leo Takae	(substituted in) 90+2'
FW	7	(Japan) Seiya Maikuma	(substituted in) 79'
FW	20	(Japan) Ryoga Sato	(substituted in) 86'
FW	22	(Japan) Takahiko Nakayama
Manager:
(Japan) Junya Morishige

GK	1	(Japan) Meguru Hirata
DF	2	(Japan) Kyohei Nomura
DF	4	(Japan) Tatsuya Kamikaseda
DF	5	(Japan) Nao Miyahara (c)
DF	6	(Japan) Migaku Yamamoto
MF	3	(Japan) Kosuke Chiku
MF	7	(Japan) Yotaro Suzuki
MF	14	(Japan) Takumi Nagura
FW	8	(Japan) Shun Uchioke	(substituted off) 79'
FW	9	(Japan) Kazuki Kobayashi	(substituted off) 43'
FW	10	(Japan) Masaya Shibuya
Substitutes:
GK	17	(Japan) Yuta Okada
DF	12	(Japan) Yuma Koizumi
DF	13	(Japan) Keisuke Toda	(substituted in) 43'
DF	19	(Japan) Shunsuke Yamaguchi
MF	15	(Japan) Kosuke Hiruma	(substituted in) 79'
MF	16	(Japan) Yudai Kawano
MF	18	(Japan) Tomohiro Fujita
FW	11	(Japan) Masashi Tashimada
FW	20	(Japan) Kenshiro Ando
Manager:
(Japan) Yasutaka Shimizu

Assistant referees:
Yosuke Takebe
Isao Nishihashi
Fourth official:
Kenta Tsukada

== Top scorers ==
Rank	Player	High School	Goals
1	(Japan) Mitsuki Murakami	Teikyo Daisan	5
2	(Japan) Daiki Mochiyama	Higashi Fukuoka	4
2	(Japan) Koki Ogawa	Toko Gakuen	4
2	(Japan) Issei Takahashi	Aomori Yamada	4
5	18 players tied		2
