= Tsuji =

Tsuji (辻, Tsuji) is a Japanese surname meaning "crossroads". Notable people with the surname include:

== Arts ==
- Ayano Tsuji (born 1978), a Japanese pop singer
- Ayumi Tsuji (born 1984), a Japanese voice actress from Ehime Prefecture
- Daisuke Tsuji (born 1982), Japanese-American actor
- Hitonari Tsuji (born 1959), a Japanese novelist, composer, and film director (also known as Jinsei Tsuji)
- Jun Tsuji (1884–1944), a Japanese poet, essayist, and playwright
- Kazuhiro Tsuji, former name of Kazu Hiro, American special effects make-up artist
- Kunio Tsuji (1925–1999), a Japanese novelist and scholar of French literature
- Masaki Tsuji (born 1932), a Japanese anime scenario writer and mystery novelist
- Nozomi Tsuji (born 1987), a Japanese pop singer
- Shindo Tsuji (辻晉堂, 1910–1981), a Japanese artist born in Tottori Prefecture, particularly famous for his prints and sculpture works
- Shion Tsuji (born 1990), a Japanese singer-songwriter best known for her song "Sky Chord (Otona ni Naru Kimi e)"

== Sports ==
- Chie Tsuji (born 1969), a Japanese volleyball player
- Hatsuhiko Tsuji (born 1958), a Japanese baseball player
- Naoto Tsuji (born 1989), a Japanese basketball player
- Shugo Tsuji (辻 周吾; born 1997), Japanese footballer

== Other ==
- Kiyoto Tsuji (辻 清人; born 1979), Japanese politician
- Masanobu Tsuji (1901–1968), a 20th-century Japanese army officer and war criminal
- Shintaro Tsuji (born 1927), founder of the Japanese company Sanrio
- Yasuhiro Tsuji (born 1955), a Japanese politician of the Democratic Party of Japan who served two terms in the National Diet
- Yota Tsuji (辻 陽太; born 1993), Japanese professional wrestler
- Jiro Tsuji, a Japanese chemist who pioneered the Tsuji–Trost reaction
- Ryuu Tsuji, a fictional character from S · A: Special A
