= Eito Furuyama =

Japanese footballer (born 1993)

Personal information
- Date of birth: 8 November 1993 (age 33)
- Height: 1.80 m (5 ft 11 in)
- Position: Defender

Youth career
- 2006–2011: JFA Academy Fukushima
- 2011: Bordeaux
- 2012–2015: Dijon

Senior career*
Years	Team	Apps	(Gls)
2012–2015	Dijon B	16	(0)
2015	NK Radomlje	5	(0)
2015–2018	Iwaki FC		

International career
2008	Japan U14		
2009	Japan U16		
- * Club domestic league appearances and goals as of 17:04, 9 July 2021 (UTC)

Eito Furuyama (古山 瑛翔, Furuyama Eito; born 8 November 1993) is a Japanese footballer who last played as a defender for Iwaki FC.

== Career statistics ==
=== Club ===
As of 6 September 2020

Appearances and goals by club, season and competition
Club	Season	League			Cup		Other		Total	
Club	Season	Division	Apps	Goals	Apps	Goals	Apps	Goals	Apps	Goals
Dijon B	2012–13	CFA 2	3	0	–		0	0	3	0
Dijon B	2013–14	CFA 2	13	0	–		0	0	13	0
Dijon B	Total		16	0	0	0	0	0	16	0
NK Radomlje	2014–15	1. SNL	5	0	0	0	0	0	5	0
Career total			21	0	0	0	0	0	21	0
