= Yusuke Ishida =

Japanese footballer

Yusuke Ishida 石田 侑資
Personal information
- Full name: Yusuke Ishida
- Date of birth: 11 November 2002 (age 23)
- Place of birth: Tokushima, Japan
- Height: 1.75 m (5 ft 9 in)
- Position: Defender

Team information
- Current team: Kyoto Sanga
- Number: 40

Youth career
- Tokushima Rapaz
- –2017: Tokushima Vortis
- 2018–2020: Ichiritsu Funabashi High School

Senior career*
Years	Team	Apps	(Gls)
2021–2022	Gainare Tottori	38	(2)
2023–2025	Iwaki FC	93	(1)
2026–	Kyoto Sanga	3	(0)
- * Club domestic league appearances and goals as of 1 August 2026

Yusuke Ishida (石田 侑資, Ishida Yusuke; born 11 November 2002) is a Japanese footballer who plays as a defender for J1 League club Kyoto Sanga.

== Club career ==
Ishida began his first professional career with Gainare Tottori in 2021. When he made his J.League debut as a substitute in the 54th minute of the opening match against Kagoshima United, he scored his first professional goal in the 60th minute. He contributed to the come from behind victory. He left the club in 2022 after two seasons at Tottori.

On 7 December 2022, Ishida joined newly promoted J2 League team Iwaki FC for the 2023 season.

After three seasons with Iwaki, in December 2025 it was announced that Ishida would be joining J1 League club Kyoto Sanga.

== Career statistics ==
=== Club ===
As of 14 April 2026.

Appearances and goals by club, season and competition
Club	Season	League			National cup (Note: Includes Emperors Cup)		League cup (Note: Includes J.League Cup)		Total	
Club	Season	Division	Apps	Goals	Apps	Goals	Apps	Goals	Apps	Goals
Gainare Tottori	2021	J3 League	17	2	1	0	–		18	2
Gainare Tottori	2022	J3 League	21	0	0	0	–		21	0
Gainare Tottori	Total		38	2	1	0	0	0	39	2
Iwaki FC	2023	J2 League	22	0	0	0	0	0	22	0
Iwaki FC	2024	J2 League	34	0	1	0	2	0	37	0
Iwaki FC	2025	J2 League	37	1	1	0	0	0	38	1
Iwaki FC	Total		93	1	2	0	2	0	97	1
Kyoto Sanga	2026	J1 (100)	2	0	–		–		2	0
Career total			133	3	3	0	2	0	138	3

== Honours ==
Japan U16

- AFC U-16 Championship: 2018
