= Yuto Yamashita =

Japanese footballer

Yuto Yamashita 山下 優人
Personal information
- Date of birth: 24 May 1996 (age 30)
- Place of birth: Chiba Prefecture, Japan
- Height: 1.74 m (5 ft 9 in)
- Position: Midfielder

Team information
- Current team: Mito HollyHock
- Number: 48

Youth career
- Chishirodai FC
- –2011: JEF United Chiba
- 2012–2015: Aomori Yamada High School

College career
Years	Team	Apps	(Gls)
2015–2019	Toin University of Yokohama		

Senior career*
Years	Team	Apps	(Gls)
2019–2025	Iwaki FC	231	(16)
2026–	Mito HollyHock	7	(0)
- * Club domestic league appearances and goals as of 12 August 2026

Yuto Yamashita (山下 優人, Yamashita Yuto; born 24 May 1996) is a Japanese footballer who plays as a midfielder for J1 League club Mito HollyHock.

== Youth career ==
Yamashita attended Aomori Yamada High School and made over 40 appearances for the school's team before moving to Toin University of Yokohama in 2015. He scored on his first start for the university team, in a 2–1 JUFA Kanto League 1 victory over Keio University. He also made his first appearances in the Emperor's Cup, playing 90 minutes in both of their games and helping Toin to a narrow 4–3 defeat against J1 League club Shonan Bellmare. Yamashita played 66 times and scored 6 goals for his university between 2015 and 2018. In his third year, he was asked to represent Kanto A in the Denso Cup tournament.

== Club career ==
In December 2018, it was announced that Yamashita would be signing for Tohoku Soccer League team Iwaki FC for the 2019 season. He made his debut for the team in May in a 3–2 Emperor's Cup defeat to Sendai University and went on to make 10 appearances in his first season with the club, helping Iwaki to gain promotion to the Japan Football League. In the 2020 season, Yamashita only made 13 appearances for the club but in the 2021 season he played in every game as Iwaki gained promotion to the J3 League. He scored his first goal for the team in a 1–1 league draw with FC Osaka. After an excellent season, Yamashita was named the league's MVP and was also inducted into the 2021 JFL Best XI.

Before the start of the 2022 season, it was announced that Yamashita would be made captain for the upcoming campaign. He made his J.League debut in a 1–1 draw with Kagoshima United and went on to play in every minute of every game throughout the season as he helped Iwaki to back-to-back promotions. For the second season running, Yamashita was inducted into the league's Best XI. In December 2022, it was announced that he had renewed his contract with the club.

In December 2025, Yamashita transferred to newly-promoted J1 League club Mito HollyHock. He made his debut on 14 February in a 2–2 draw against Machida Zelvia in the J1 100 Year Vision League.

== Career statistics ==
=== Club ===
As of 6 March 2026.

Appearances and goals by club, season and competition
Club	Season	League			National Cup		Other		Total	
Club	Season	Division	Apps	Goals	Apps	Goals	Apps	Goals	Apps	Goals
Japan			League		Emperor's Cup		Other		Total	
Toin University of Yokohama	2015	–			2	0	–		2	0
Iwaki FC	2019	Tohoku Soccer League	0	0	1	0	9 (Note: 3 appearances in the All Japan Senior Football Championship) (Note: 6 appearances in the Japanese Regional Football Champions League)	0	10	0
Iwaki FC	2020	JFL	12	0	1	0	–		13	0
Iwaki FC	2021	JFL	32	2	1	0	–		33	2
Iwaki FC	2022	J3 League	34	0	0	0	–		34	0
Iwaki FC	2023	J2 League	42	3	1	0	–		43	3
Iwaki FC	2024	J2 League	37	1	2	0	2 (Note: Appearances in the J.League Cup)	0	41	1
Iwaki FC	2025	J2 League	37	5	1	0	0	0	23	3
Iwaki FC	2025	J2 League	37	5	1	0	0	0	23	3
Iwaki FC	Total		231	16	10	0	11	0	222	12
Mito HollyHock	2026	J1 (100)	3	0	–		–		3	0
Career total			234	16	10	0	11	0	225	12

== Honours ==
Iwaki

- Tohoku Soccer League: 2019
- Japanese Regional Football Champions League: 2019
- Japan Football League: 2021
- J3 League: 2022

Individual

- JFL MVP: 2021
- JFL Best XI: 2021
- J3 League Best XI: 2022
