= Hiroto Iwabuchi =

Japanese footballer

Hiroto Iwabuchi 岩渕 弘人
Personal information
- Date of birth: 17 September 1997 (age 29)
- Place of birth: Iwate Prefecture, Japan
- Height: 1.77 m (5 ft 10 in)
- Position: Forward

Team information
- Current team: Vegalta Sendai
- Number: 27

Youth career
- –2009: Hagisho SC
- 2010–2012: Hagisho Junior High School
- 2013–2016: Tono High School

College career
Years	Team	Apps	(Gls)
2016–2019	Sendai University		

Senior career*
Years	Team	Apps	(Gls)
2020–2023	Iwaki FC	88	(26)
2024–2025	Fagiano Okayama	66	(16)
2026–	Vegalta Sendai	22	(6)
- * Club domestic league appearances and goals as of 17 August 2026

Hiroto Iwabuchi (岩渕 弘人, Iwabuchi Hiroto; born 17 September 1997) is a Japanese professional footballer who plays as a forward for J2 League club Vegalta Sendai.

== Youth career ==
Between 2014 and 2015, Iwabuchi represented Tono High School in the All Japan High School Soccer Tournament, however his school were knocked out in the first round of both tournaments. He then went on to represent Sendai University in the Prime Minister's Cup and the Intercollegiate in 2017 and 2018, making 8 appearances in these competitions. In 2019, Iwabuchi made his first appearance in the Emperor's Cup, scoring an 82nd-minute winner in a 3–2 victory over Iwaki FC in the first round. Sendai were eventually knocked out in the second round, losing 2–1 to J.League team Yokohama FC, with Iwabuchi playing 32 minutes after coming on as a second-half substitute.

== Club career ==
=== Iwaki FC ===
In 2020, Iwabuchi moved to Japan Football League club Iwaki FC. He scored on his debut for the club in July in a 2–1 league victory over Nara Club. Iwabuchi additionally went on to make 15 appearances across all competitions in his first season, scoring 3 goals in total.

In 2021, he played 25 games and scored 6 goals, as Iwaki were crowned champions of the JFL and were promoted to the J3 League for the first time in their history.

In 2022, Iwabuchi was a regular starter in his first season in the J3 League, scoring regularly and following a hat-trick in a 6–0 win over YSCC Yokohama was awarded the J3 Monthly MVP award. He played 31 games and scored 10 goals, as Iwaki were crowned champions of the J3 League and were promoted to the J2 League for the first time in their history. Near the end of the 2022 season in a league game against Tegevajaro Miyazaki, Iwabuchi suffered a cruciate ligament injury which would keep him out of action for at least six months. On 17 December 2022, Iwabuchi renewed his contract with club for the upcoming 2023 season.

Following his injury, it wasn't until June 2023 that he was able to return to playing. After coming on as a second-half substitute, Iwabuchi scored in his first game back in a 5–1 victory for Iwaki over Omiya Ardija. He then went on to score six goals in his next six games, all after coming on as a substitute. For this run of form, Iwabuchi was awarded the July Monthly MVP award. He finished the season with seven goals in 20 appearances.

=== Fagiano Okayama ===
In December 2023, it was announced that Iwabuchi would be transferring to Fagiano Okayama ahead of the 2024 season. He made his debut on the first game of the season in a 3–0 victory over Tochigi SC. He scored his first goal for the club in April, in a 2–0 victory over Roasso Kumamoto. He had a slow goal-scoring start at his new club, only scoring 1 goal in his first 12 games. However, his form picked up and he scored in 4 straight games in May and June. He finished the season with 13 goals in 34 league games, helping Okayama finish in the play-off places in 5th. In the promotion play-offs, Iwabuchi scored in the play-off semi-final win over Montedio Yamagata and also started the play-off final against Vegalta Sendai, which Okayama won 2–0 and gained promotion to the J1 League for the first time in their history. At the end of season awards, Iwabuchi was nominated for the Best XI award, but did not make the final XI.

Iwabuchi made his J1 League debut in February 2025, in a 2–0 victory over Gamba Osaka. He then had to wait until August to score his first J1 goal, as he scored in back-to-back games against Gamba Osaka and Kashiwa Reysol respectively.

=== Vegalta Sendai ===
In December 2025, it was announced that Iwabuchi would be joining J2 League club Vegalta Sendai ahead of the J2–J3 100 Year Vision League. Although this meant he would be dropping down a division, in a statement Iwabuchi described Vegalta Sendai as a club he had "loved and admired since elementary school", adding that his decision was ultimately based on "my heart and my love for Vegalta."

== Career statistics ==
=== Club ===
As of 1 March 2026.

Appearances and goals by club, season and competition
Club	Season	League			National Cup		League Cup		Other		Total	
Club	Season	Division	Apps	Goals	Apps	Goals	Apps	Goals	Apps	Goals	Apps	Goals
Japan			League		Emperor's Cup		J. League Cup		Other		Total	
Sendai University	2018	–			2	1	–		–		2	1
Iwaki FC	2020	JFL	13	3	2	0	–		–		15	3
Iwaki FC	2021	JFL	24	6	1	0	–		–		25	6
Iwaki FC	2022	J3 League	31	10	0	0	–		–		31	10
Iwaki FC	2023	J2 League	20	7	0	0	–		–		20	7
Iwaki FC	Total		88	26	3	0	0	0	0	0	91	26
Fagiano Okayama	2024	J2 League	34	13	1	0	1	0	2 (Note: Appearances in the J2 promotion play-offs)	1	38	14
Fagiano Okayama	2025	J1 League	32	3	1	0	1	0	–		34	3
Fagiano Okayama	Total		66	16	2	0	2	0	2	1	72	17
Vegalta Sendai	2026	J2/J3 (100)	3	1	–		–		–		3	1
Career total			157	43	7	1	2	0	2	1	168	45

== Personal life ==
Iwabuchi has been a supporter of Vegalta Sendai since he was young.
