= Eiji Miyamoto =

Japanese footballer

Eiji Miyamoto 宮本英治
Personal information
- Date of birth: 3 August 1998 (age 28)
- Place of birth: Fukuoka Prefecture, Japan
- Height: 1.73 m (5 ft 8 in)
- Position: Defensive midfielder

Team information
- Current team: Fagiano Okayama
- Number: 41

Youth career
- 2005–2010: Juzan FC
- 2011–2016: JFA Academy Fukushima

College career
Years	Team	Apps	(Gls)
2017–2020	Kokushikan University		

Senior career*
Years	Team	Apps	(Gls)
2021–2023	Iwaki FC	105	(6)
2024–2025	Albirex Niigata	33	(1)
2025–	Fagiano Okayama	29	(0)
- * Club domestic league appearances and goals as of 12 August 2026

Eiji Miyamoto (宮本英治, Miyamoto Eiji; born 3 August 1998) is a Japanese footballer who plays as a defensive midfielder for J1 League club Fagiano Okayama.

== Youth career ==
Miyamoto started his career at Juzan FC and attended Tomioka High School. However, he spent most of his high school years playing at JFA Academy Fukushima, which moved to Gotemba, Shizuoka following the 2011 Tōhoku earthquake and tsunami. In 2014, he made his first appearance for JFA Academy Fukushima in the Prince Takamado Cup U-18 Football League aged 16, coming on as a late substitute. He started to get more game time in 2015, playing 12 games and starting in 5 of those. He scored his first goal for JFA Academy Fukushima in a 3–1 win over Ryutsu Keizai University. In 2016, Miyamoto helped JFA Academy Fukushima to the quarter-finals of the Japan Club Youth Cup, where he scored in their 3–2 defeat to Vissel Kobe U-18s.

From 2017, Miyamoto represented Kokushikan University in the JUFA Kanto League. He made his debut for the university in June 2018, in a 4–0 defeat to Waseda University. He played in 15 games in his first three years before breaking out in the 2020 season – the season he was named vice-captain – by making 22 appearances in JUFA Kanto League 1. He also scored his only goal for Kokushikan in a 3–0 win over Meiji University.

== Club career ==
In December 2020, it was announced that Miyamoto would be signing for JFL team Iwaki FC for the 2021 season. He made his debut for the team in March in a 2–1 league victory over Veertien Mie and scored his first goal in a 2–0 win over MIO Biwako Shiga. At the end of the 2021 season, Miyamoto had participated in almost all of the league games, playing in 30 out of a possible 32, helping Iwaki FC gain promotion to the J3 League.

In the 2022 season and his first in the J3 League, Miyamoto again played almost every minute, appearing in all 34 of Iwaki's league games. His J.League debut came in a 1–1 draw with Kagoshima United and his first goal in the J.League was in a 4–0 home victory over Azul Claro Numazu. He ended the season with two goals and three assists. His performances helped Iwaki to back-to-back promotions and he was rewarded with a new contract in December 2022.

For the 2023 season, Miyamoto was again an important member of the team, making 41 league appearances. Still mainly used as a central midfielder, towards the latter half of the season he began to play in the right-back position and he helped secure Iwaki's safety in the J2 League.

In December 2023, it was announced that Miyamoto would be joining J1 League club Albirex Niigata.

== Career statistics ==
=== Club ===
As of 12 March 2026

Appearances and goals by club, season and competition
Club	Season	League			National Cup		League Cup		Total	
Club	Season	Division	Apps	Goals	Apps	Goals	Apps	Goals	Apps	Goals
Japan			League		Emperor's Cup		J. League Cup		Total	
Iwaki FC	2021	JFL	30	1	1	0	–		31	1
Iwaki FC	2022	J3 League	34	2	0	0	–		34	2
Iwaki FC	2023	J2 League	41	3	1	0	–		42	3
Iwaki FC	Total		105	6	2	0	0	0	107	6
Albirex Niigata	2024	J1 League	23	1	1	0	5	0	29	1
Albirex Niigata	2025	J1 League	10	0	1	0	3	0	14	0
Albirex Niigata	Total		33	1	2	0	8	0	43	1
Fagiano Okayama	2025	J1 League	11	0	0	0	0	0	11	0
Fagiano Okayama	2026	J1 (100)	5	0	–		–		5	0
Fagiano Okayama	Total		16	0	0	0	0	0	16	0
Career total			154	7	4	0	8	0	166	7

== Honours ==
Iwaki FC

- Japan Football League : 2021
- J3 League : 2022
