= Rei Ieizumi =

Japanese footballer

Rei Ieizumi 家泉 怜依
Personal information
- Full name: Rei Ieizumi
- Date of birth: 20 January 2000 (age 26)
- Place of birth: Kagawa Prefecture, Japan
- Height: 1.85 m (6 ft 1 in)
- Position: Centre-back

Team information
- Current team: Mito HollyHock
- Number: 50

Youth career
- Kokura Minami FC
- FC Diamo
- 2015–2017: Sangawa High School

College career
Years	Team	Apps	(Gls)
2018–2021	Ryutsu Keizai University		

Senior career*
Years	Team	Apps	(Gls)
2022–2023	Iwaki FC	72	(3)
2024–2026	Hokkaido Consadole Sapporo	55	(9)
2026–	Mito HollyHock	1	(0)
- * Club domestic league appearances and goals as of 12 August 2026

Rei Ieizumi (家泉 怜依, Ieizumi Rei; born 20 January 2000) is a Japanese footballer who plays as a centre-back for J1 League club Mito HollyHock.

== Youth career ==
Ieizumi played for his high school between 2015 and 2017, before going on to play for Ryutsu Keizai University FC. In 2018 and 2019, Ieizumi played 21 times in the Japan Football League for the university affiliate side Ryutsu Keizai Dragons Ryugasaki and scored his first goal for them in a 3–3 with MIO Biwako Shiga. In 2021, he played almost every game in the JUFA Kanto League 1 season, scoring two goals and helping Ryutsu Keizai University to win the championship. He also scored on his Emperor's Cup debut in a 3–2 defeat by YSCC Yokohama.

== Club career ==
In December 2021, it was announced that Ieizumi would be signing for newly promoted J3 League team Iwaki FC for the 2022 season. He made his debut for the team in March in a 1–1 league draw with Kagoshima United and scored his first goal in a 5–0 win over Vanraure Hachinohe.

At the end of the 2022 season, Ieizumi had helped Iwaki gain promotion to the J2 League for the first time in their history playing in 33 of a possible 34 games. For his efforts, he was inducted into the 2022 J3 Best XI.

In December 2023, it was announced that Ieizumi would be joining J1 League club Hokkaido Consadole Sapporo for the 2024 season.

== Career statistics ==
=== Club ===
As of 12 August 2026.

Appearances and goals by club, season and competition
Club	Season	League			National Cup		League Cup		Total	
Club	Season	Division	Apps	Goals	Apps	Goals	Apps	Goals	Apps	Goals
Japan			League		Emperor's Cup		J. League Cup		Total	
Ryutsu Keizai University	2021	–			1	1	–		1	1
Iwaki FC	2022	J3 League	33	1	0	0	–		33	1
Iwaki FC	2023	J2 League	39	2	0	0	–		39	2
Iwaki FC	Total		72	3	0	0	0	0	72	3
Consadole Sapporo	2024	J1 League	12	0	3	0	4	1	19	1
Consadole Sapporo	2025	J2 League	26	5	1	0	1	0	28	5
Consadole Sapporo	2026	J2/J3 (100)	17	4	–		–		17	4
Consadole Sapporo	Total		55	9	4	0	5	1	64	10
Mito HollyHock	2026–27	J1 League	1	0	0	0	0	0	0	0
Career total			128	12	4	1	5	1	139	14

== Honours ==
Iwaki FC

- J3 League : 2022

Individual

- J3 League Best XI: 2022
