= Genki Egawa =

Japanese footballer (born 2000)

Genki Egawa 江川 慶城
Personal information
- Date of birth: 2 April 2000 (age 26)
- Place of birth: Ōtsu, Shiga, Japan
- Height: 1.81 m (5 ft 11 in)
- Position: Centre-back

Team information
- Current team: Kagoshima United
- Number: 35

Youth career
- Kyoto Sanga
- 2019: → Londrina-PR (youth loan)

Senior career*
Years	Team	Apps	(Gls)
2019-2020	Kyoto Sanga	0	(0)
2022-2023	Iwaki FC	40	(1)
2024	FC Osaka	7	(0)
2024-2025	Tegevajaro Miyazaki	46	(6)
2026-	Kagoshima United	13	(1)
- * Club domestic league appearances and goals as of 18 August 2026

Genki Egawa (江川 慶城, Egawa Genki; born 2 April 2000) is a Japanese footballer currently playing as a centre-back for Kagoshima United.

== Club career ==
In March 2019, Egawa moved to Brazilian side Londrina-PR on loan, alongside teammate Kohei Hattori. At the end of the following season, it was announced that Egawa would move to fellow Japanese side Iwaki FC ahead of the 2021 season.

== Career statistics ==
=== Club ===
As of 27 May 2024.

Appearances and goals by club, season and competition
Club	Season	League			Cup		Other		Total	
Club	Season	Division	Apps	Goals	Apps	Goals	Apps	Goals	Apps	Goals
Iwaki FC	2021	JFL	6	0	0	0	0	0	6	0
Iwaki FC	2022	J3 League	19	0	0	0	0	0	19	0
Iwaki FC	2023	J2 League	21	1	1	0	0	0	22	1
Iwaki FC	Total		46	1	1	0	0	0	47	1
FC Osaka	2024	J3 League	7	0	0	0	1	0	8	0
Career total			53	1	1	0	1	0	55	1
