= Toru Takagiwa =

Japanese footballer (born 1995)

Toru Takagiwa 高木和 徹
Personal information
- Full name: Toru Takagiwa
- Date of birth: 15 April 1995 (age 31)
- Place of birth: Nogi, Tochigi, Japan
- Height: 1.85 m (6 ft 1 in)
- Position: Goalkeeper

Team information
- Current team: FC Imabari
- Number: 71

Youth career
- Nogi SSS
- Verdy SS Oyama
- Shimizu S-Pulse

Senior career*
Years	Team	Apps	(Gls)
2014–2021	Shimizu S-Pulse	0	(0)
2014–2015	→ J. League U-22 (loan)	14	(0)
2018	→ JEF United Chiba (loan)	0	(0)
2020–2021	→ V-Varen Nagasaki (loan)	21	(0)
2022–2023	Tokyo Verdy	15	(0)
2023	→ Iwaki FC (loan)	25	(0)
2024	JEF United Chiba	0	(0)
2025–	FC Imabari	3	(0)

International career
2012	Japan U-17		
2013–2014	Japan U-18 / U-19		
- * Club domestic league appearances and goals as of 1 January 2026

Toru Takagiwa (高木和 徹, Takagiwa Toru; born April 15, 1995, in Nogi, Tochigi) is a Japanese football player who play as a Goalkeeper and currently play for J2 League club, FC Imabari.

== Club career ==
On 17 December 2021, Takagiwa officially signed to J2 club, Tokyo Verdy.

On 25 December 2022, Takagiwa was loaned out to J2 promotion club, Iwaki FC from 2023 season.

He left from the club in 2024 after JEF United Chiba was ended contract of Takagiwa due to never played in J2 League with former club since 2018 on loan.

On 18 December 2024, Takagiwa was announce official transfer to J2 promotion club, FC Imabari from 2025 season.

== Career statistics ==
As of the start from 2025 season.

Appearances and goals by club, season and competition
Club	Season	League			Emperor's Cup		J.League Cup		Total	
Club	Season	Division	Apps	Goals	Apps	Goals	Apps	Goals	Apps	Goals
Shimizu S-Pulse	2014	J.League Div 1	0	0	0	0	0	0	0	0
Shimizu S-Pulse	2015	J1 League	0	0	0	0	0	0	0	0
Shimizu S-Pulse	2016	J2 League	0	0	2	0	–		2	0
Shimizu S-Pulse	2017	J1 League	0	0	2	0	2	0	4	0
Shimizu S-Pulse	2019	J1 League	0	0	2	0	0	0	2	0
JEF United Chiba (loan)	2018	J2 League	0	0	0	0	–		0	0
V-Varen Nagasaki (loan)	2020	J2 League	19	0	0	0	–		19	0
V-Varen Nagasaki (loan)	2021	J2 League	2	0	2	0	–		4	0
Tokyo Verdy	2022	J2 League	15	0	0	0	0	0	15	0
Iwaki FC (loan)	2023	J2 League	25	0	0	0	–		25	0
JEF United Chiba	2024	J2 League	0	0	0	0	0	0	0	0
FC Imabari	2025	J2 League	0	0	0	0	0	0	0	0
Career total			61	0	8	0	2	0	71	0
