= Asahi Haga =

Japanese footballer

Asahi Haga 芳賀 日陽
Personal information
- Full name: Asahi Haga
- Date of birth: 30 July 2000 (age 26)
- Place of birth: Tokyo, Japan
- Height: 1.68 m (5 ft 6 in)
- Position: Midfielder

Team information
- Current team: FC Osaka
- Number: 8

Youth career
- Itabashi SSS
- –2018: FC Tokyo

Senior career*
Years	Team	Apps	(Gls)
2018	FC Tokyo	11	(0)
2023–2024	Iwaki FC	11	(0)
2024	FC Osaka (loan)	15	(2)
2025–	FC Osaka	23	(2)
- * Club domestic league appearances and goals as of 18 August 2026

Asahi Haga (芳賀 日陽, Haga Asahi; born July 30, 2000) is a Japanese footballer who plays as a midfielder for J2 League club FC Osaka.

== Club career ==
Haga was born in Tokyo on July 30, 2000. He joined J1 League club FC Tokyo from their youth team in 2018.

On 29 January 2022, Haga announced he would join Iwaki FC from the 2023 season. He was also approved as a special designated player on February 18 at same year.
