= Ryo Odajima =

Japanese footballer

Ryo Odajima 小田島 怜
Personal information
- Date of birth: 10 June 1996 (age 30)
- Place of birth: Tama, Tokyo, Japan
- Height: 1.76 m (5 ft 9 in)
- Position: Defender

Team information
- Current team: Okinawa SV

Youth career
- –2014: Tokyo Verdy

College career
| Years | Team | Apps | (Gls) |
| 2015–2018 | Toin University of Yokohama | | |

Senior career*
| Years | Team | Apps | (Gls) |
| 2019–2020 | SC Sagamihara | 14 | (0) |
| 2020–2022 | Iwaki FC | 30 | (1) |
| 2023– | Okinawa SV | 0 | (0) |
- * Club domestic league appearances and goals as of 20 January 2023

Ryo Odajima (小田島 怜, Odajima Ryo; born 10 June 1996) is a Japanese footballer currently playing as a defender for Okinawa SV.

== Career ==
Odajima begin first youth career with Buddy SC, later he enter to Tokyo Verdy as junior and youth team until 2014 and enter college in Too University at Yokohama, Kanagawa from 2015 until he was graduation in 2018.

On 28 December 2018, Odajima begin first career with SC Sagamihara from 2019.

On 25 August 2020, Odajima signed JFL club, Iwaki FC for during 2020 season, he brought his club promotion to J3 and J2 in 2022 and 2023 respectively at two years. He left from the club after three years at Iwaki on 19 November 2022.

On 26 December 2022, Odajima joined newly JFL-promoted club Okinawa SV for the upcoming 2023 season.

== Career statistics ==
=== Club ===
As of the start from 2023 season.

| Club | Season | League | | | National Cup | | League Cup | | Other | | Total | |
| Club | Season | Division | Apps | Goals | Apps | Goals | Apps | Goals | Apps | Goals | Apps | Goals |
|---|---|---|---|---|---|---|---|---|---|---|---|---|
| SC Sagamihara | 2019 | J3 League | 14 | 0 | 0 | 0 | – | | 0 | 0 | 14 | 0 |
| SC Sagamihara | 2020 | J3 League | 0 | 0 | 0 | 0 | – | | 0 | 0 | 0 | 0 |
| SC Sagamihara | Total | | 14 | 0 | 0 | 0 | 0 | 0 | 0 | 0 | 14 | 0 |
| Iwaki FC | 2020 | Japan Football League | 12 | 0 | 0 | 0 | – | | 0 | 0 | 12 | 0 |
| Iwaki FC | 2021 | Japan Football League | 18 | 0 | 1 | 0 | – | | 0 | 0 | 19 | 0 |
| Iwaki FC | 2022 | J3 League | 0 | 0 | 0 | 0 | – | | 0 | 0 | 0 | 0 |
| Iwaki FC | Total | | 30 | 0 | 1 | 0 | 0 | 0 | 0 | 0 | 31 | 0 |
| Okinawa SV | 2023 | Japan Football League | 0 | 0 | 0 | 0 | – | | 0 | 0 | 0 | 0 |
| Okinawa SV | Total | | 0 | 0 | 0 | 0 | 0 | 0 | 0 | 0 | 0 | 0 |
| Career total | | | 44 | 0 | 1 | 0 | 0 | 0 | 0 | 0 | 45 | 0 |

== Honours ==
Iwaki FC

- Japan Football League: 2021
