= Kengo Tanaka =

Japanese footballer (born 1989)

Kengo Tanaka 田中 謙吾
Personal information
- Full name: Kengo Tanaka
- Date of birth: 30 December 1989 (age 36)
- Place of birth: Kanagawa, Japan
- Height: 1.85 m (6 ft 1 in)
- Position: Goalkeeper

Team information
- Current team: Iwaki FC
- Number: 1

Youth career
- 2008–2011: Nippon Sport Science University

Senior career*
Years	Team	Apps	(Gls)
2012–2018	Nagano Parceiro	74	(0)
2019–2020	Matsumoto Yamaga	0	(0)
2021	Nagano Parceiro	15	(0)
2022–	Iwaki FC	3	(0)
- * Club domestic league appearances and goals as of 23:34, 31 August 2023 (UTC)

Kengo Tanaka (田中 謙吾, Tanaka Kengo; born December 30, 1989) is a Japanese footballer who plays as a goalkeeper for J2 League club Iwaki FC.

== Career ==
Prior to joining Iwaki FC Tanaka played 8 seasons for Nagano Parceiro, and was signed for two seasons with Matsumoto Yamaga FC. During his time signed with Matsumoto, Tanaka didn't play in any games. Ahead of the 2024 season, Tanaka was named captain of Iwaki FC.

== Career statistics ==
Updated to the start from 2023 season.

Appearances and goals by club, season and competition
Club	Season	League			Emperor's Cup		J.League Cup		Total	
Club	Season	Division	Apps	Goals	Apps	Goals	Apps	Goals	Apps	Goals
Nagano Parceiro	2012	JFL	0	0	1	0	—		1	0
Nagano Parceiro	2013	JFL	0	0	0	0	—		0	0
Nagano Parceiro	2014	J3 League	33	0	1	0	—		34	0
Nagano Parceiro	2015	J3 League	35	0	2	0	—		37	0
Nagano Parceiro	2016	J3 League	0	0	0	0	—		0	0
Nagano Parceiro	2017	J3 League	0	0	1	0	—		1	0
Nagano Parceiro	2018	J3 League	0	0	0	0	—		0	0
Matsumoto Yamaga	2019	J1 League	0	0	0	0	0	0	0	0
Matsumoto Yamaga	2020	J2 League	0	0	0	0	—		0	0
Nagano Parceiro	2021	J3 League	15	0	1	0	—		16	0
Iwaki FC	2022	J3 League	2	0	0	0	—		2	0
Iwaki FC	2023	J2 League	0	0	0	0	—		0	0
Career total			85	0	6	0	0	0	91	0

== Honours ==
Iwaki FC

- J3 League: 2022
