= Kaito Miyake =

Japanese footballer (born 1997)

Personal information
- Date of birth: 27 August 1997 (age 29)
- Place of birth: Okayama, Japan
- Height: 1.73 m (5 ft 8 in)
- Position: Midfielder

Team information
- Current team: Atletico Suzuka Club
- Number: 41

Youth career
- 2013–2015: Higashi Fukuoka High School

College career
| Years | Team | Apps | (Gls) |
| 2015–2017 | NIFS Kanoya | | |

Senior career*
| Years | Team | Apps | (Gls) |
| 2017–2019 | Fortuna Düsseldorf II | 57 | (10) |
| 2019 | Tochigi | 11 | (0) |
| 2020–2022 | Kagoshima United | 27 | (3) |
| 2022–2024 | Atletico Suzuka Club | 49 | (20) |
| 2024– | Atletico Suzuka Club | 52 | (9) |
- * Club domestic league appearances and goals as of 23 August 2026

Kaito Miyake (三宅 海斗, Miyake Kaito; born 27 August 1997) is a Japanese footballer who plays as a midfielder for Kagoshima United.

== Career statistics ==
As of 10 November 2020

Appearances and goals by club, season and competition
| Club | Season | League | | | Cup (Note: Includes Emperor's Cup.) | | Other | | Total | |
| Club | Season | Division | Apps | Goals | Apps | Goals | Apps | Goals | Apps | Goals |
|---|---|---|---|---|---|---|---|---|---|---|
| Fortuna Düsseldorf II | 2017–18 | Regionalliga West | 26 | 2 | 0 | 0 | 0 | 0 | 1 | 0 |
| Fortuna Düsseldorf II | 2018–19 | Regionalliga West | 31 | 8 | 0 | 0 | 0 | 0 | 1 | 0 |
| Fortuna Düsseldorf II | Total | | 57 | 10 | 0 | 0 | 0 | 0 | 57 | 10 |
| Tochigi | 2019 | J2 League | 11 | 0 | 1 | 0 | 0 | 0 | 12 | 0 |
| Kagoshima United | 2020 | J3 League | 13 | 2 | 0 | 0 | 0 | 0 | 13 | 2 |
| Career total | | | 81 | 12 | 1 | 0 | 0 | 0 | 82 | 12 |
