= Ryo Endo =

Japanese association football player

Ryō Endō 遠藤 凌
Personal information
- Full name: Ryō Endō
- Date of birth: 6 July 1998 (age 28)
- Place of birth: Saitama, Japan
- Height: 1.83 m (6 ft 0 in)
- Position: Defender

Team information
- Current team: Iwaki FC
- Number: 3

Youth career
- Hanno JSC
- 2011–2013: Sakado Diplomats FC
- 2014–2016: Urawa Red Diamonds

College career
Years	Team	Apps	(Gls)
2017–2020	Toin University of Yokohama		

Senior career*
Years	Team	Apps	(Gls)
2018	Toin University of Yokohama FC	18	(1)
2021–2024	Albirex Niigata	8	(1)
2022–2023	→ Iwaki FC (loan)	56	(5)
2025–	Iwaki FC	28	(2)
- * Club domestic league appearances and goals as of 14 August 2026

Ryō Endō (遠藤 凌, Endō Ryō; born 6 July 2002) is a Japanese footballer who plays as a defender for J2 League club Iwaki FC.

== Club career ==
Endo made his professional debut in a 4–1 Emperor's Cup match against Zweigen Kanazawa.

Endo was loaned out to Iwaki FC on 17 June 2022. On 5 November the same year, he helped bring his club promotion to the J2 League for the first time, as well as being J3 League champions in the 2022 season. On 6 December, Endo extended his loan at the club for the 2023 season.

After one season back with Albirex Niigata in 2024, at the end of the season Endo moved on a permanent transfer to Iwaki ahead of the 2025 season.

== Career statistics ==
=== Club ===
As of 7 March 2024.

Club	Season	League			National Cup (Note: Appearances in the Emperor's Cup)		League Cup		Other		Total	
Club	Season	Division	Apps	Goals	Apps	Goals	Apps	Goals	Apps	Goals	Apps	Goals
Toin University of Yokohama FC	2018	Kantō Soccer League	18	1	–				0	0	18	1
Toin University of Yokohama	2019	–			2	0	–		0	0	2	0
Toin University of Yokohama	2020	–			2	1	–		0	0	2	1
Toin University of Yokohama	Total		18	1	4	1	0	0	0	0	22	2
Albirex Niigata	2021	J2 League	1	0	1	0	0	0	0	0	2	0
Albirex Niigata	2022	J2 League	0	0	1	0	0	0	0	0	1	0
Albirex Niigata	2024	J1 League	7	1	2	0	5	0	0	0	14	1
Albirex Niigata	Total		8	1	4	0	5	0	0	0	17	1
Iwaki FC (loan)	2022	J3 League	20	2	0	0	0	0	0	0	20	2
Iwaki FC (loan)	2023	J2 League	36	3	1	1	0	0	0	0	37	4
Iwaki FC (loan)	Total		56	5	1	1	0	0	0	0	57	6
Career total			82	7	9	2	5	0	0	0	96	9

== Honours ==
Iwaki FC

- J3 League: 2022
