= Taiki Kato =

Japanese footballer

Taiki Kato 加藤 大樹
Personal information
- Full name: Taiki Kato
- Date of birth: 14 March 1993 (age 33)
- Place of birth: Nara, Japan
- Height: 1.70 m (5 ft 7 in)
- Position: Left midfielder

Team information
- Current team: Zweigen Kanazawa
- Number: 17

Youth career
- 2008–2010: Rissho Univ. Shonan High School

College career
Years	Team	Apps	(Gls)
2011–2014	Biwako Seikei Sport College		

Senior career*
Years	Team	Apps	(Gls)
2015	SP Kyoto FC	26	(9)
2016–2017	Renofa Yamaguchi	52	(2)
2018–2019	Zweigen Kanazawa	78	(10)
2020–2023	Montedio Yamagata	122	(21)
2023–	Zweigen Kanazawa	68	(7)
- * Club domestic league appearances and goals as of 21 August 2026

Taiki Kato (加藤 大樹, Katō Taiki; born 14 March 1993 in Nara) is a Japanese footballer who plays for Zweigen Kanazawa.

== Club statistics ==
Updated to 26 July 2022.

Appearances and goals by club, season and competition
Club	Season	League			Emperor's Cup		Total	
Club	Season	Division	Apps	Goals	Apps	Goals	Apps	Goals
SP Kyoto FC	2015	JFL	26	9	–		26	9
Renofa Yamaguchi	2016	J2 League	23	2	1	0	24	2
Renofa Yamaguchi	2017	J2 League	29	0	0	0	29	0
Zweigen Kanazawa	2018	J2 League	39	3	2	0	41	3
Zweigen Kanazawa	2019	J2 League	39	7	1	0	40	7
Montedio Yamagata	2020	J2 League	35	3	–		35	3
Montedio Yamagata	2021	J2 League	28	7	1	0	29	7
Montedio Yamagata	2022	J2 League	24	5	0	0	24	5
Career total			243	36	5	0	248	36
