= Yuzo Tamura =

Japanese footballer

Yuzo Tamura 田村 雄三
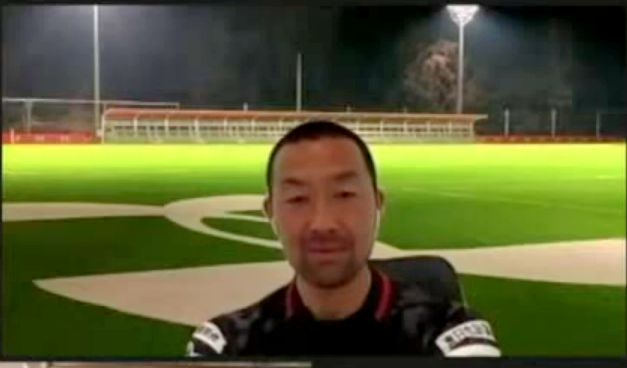

Personal information
- Full name: Yuzo Tamura
- Date of birth: 7 December 1982 (age 43)
- Place of birth: Shibukawa, Gunma, Japan
- Height: 1.80 m (5 ft 11 in)
- Position: Midfielder

Youth career
- 1998–2000: Teikyo High School

College career
Years	Team	Apps	(Gls)
2001–2004	Chuo University		

Senior career*
Years	Team	Apps	(Gls)
2005–2010	Shonan Bellmare	187	(4)
Total		187	(4)

Managerial career
- 2017–2021: Iwaki FC
- 2023–2026: Iwaki FC
- * Club domestic league appearances and goals

Yuzo Tamura (田村 雄三, Tamura Yūzō; born December 7, 1982) is a Japanese professional football manager and former player who was most recently the manager of J2 League club Iwaki FC.

== Career ==
Yuzo begin his youth career with Chuo University, playing from 2001 until he graduated in 2004.

Yuzo began his professional career playing for Shonan Bellmare from 2005. He remained with the club for six years until his retirement from football at the end of the 2010 season.

== Managerial career ==
In December 2015, Yuzo became a staff member in the reinforcement and scouting department of Iwaki FC. On 1 January 2017, he was appointed manager of Iwaki FC.

Since he had not obtained the JFA official S-Class coaching license required to become a J. League manager, and Iwaki FC was aiming for promotion to the League, Yuzo stepped down as Iwaki's manager after the 2021 season, becoming sports director for the 2022 season. In 2022, while working as a sports director, he took the S-Class license course necessary to become a J. League manager and obtained his S-Class license in 2023.

On 14 June 2023, Tamura returned as Manager of Iwaki FC, replacing Hiromasa Suguri, whose contract was ended after a disappointing performance as manager.

In September 2026, Tamura handed in his resignation after a poor start to the 2026–27 J2 League season.

== Career statistics ==
=== Club ===
As of the end of 2010 season.

Appearances and goals by club, season and competition
Club performance			League		Cup		League Cup		Total	
Season	Club	League	Apps	Goals	Apps	Goals	Apps	Goals	Apps	Goals
Japan			League		Emperor's Cup		League Cup		Total	
2005	Shonan Bellmare	J2 League	24	0	–				24	0
2006	Shonan Bellmare	J2 League	34	0	2	0	–		36	0
2007	Shonan Bellmare	J2 League	31	2	2	0	–		33	2
2008	Shonan Bellmare	J2 League	31	2	–				31	2
2009	Shonan Bellmare	J2 League	45	0	–				45	0
2010	Shonan Bellmare	J1 League	22	0	–				22	0
Career total			187	4	4	0	–		191	4

== Managerial statistics ==
As of the end 2023 season.

Managerial record by club and tenure
Team	From	To	Record				
Team	From	To	G	W	D	L	Win %
Iwaki FC	1 February 2017	31 January 2022	89	57	16	16	64.04
Iwaki FC	14 June 2023	present	22	8	7	7	36.36
Total			111	65	23	23	58.56
