= Riku Saga =

Japanese footballer

Riku Saga 嵯峨 理久
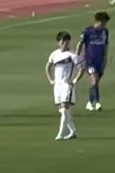

Personal information
- Date of birth: 27 May 1998 (age 28)
- Place of birth: Aomori Prefecture, Japan
- Height: 1.66 m (5 ft 5 in)
- Position: Defender

Team information
- Current team: Kagoshima United
- Number: 2

Youth career
- Tenno SS
- Vanraure Hachinohe
- Wings FC
- 2014–2016: Aomori Yamada High School

College career
Years	Team	Apps	(Gls)
2017–2021	Sendai University		

Senior career*
Years	Team	Apps	(Gls)
2021–2024	Iwaki FC	92	(14)
2024–2026	Fagiano Okayama	8	(0)
2026	→ Kagoshima United (loan)	18	(3)
2026–	Kagoshima United	2	(1)
- * Club domestic league appearances and goals as of 18 August 2026

Riku Saga (嵯峨 理久, Saga Riku; born 27 May 1998) is a Japanese footballer who plays as a defender and currently play for J3 League club Kagoshima United.

== Youth career ==
Saga was a good player at junior high school level and was even selected for a Japan U-15 training camp. After graduating from junior high, there was interest from some J.League clubs but Saga decided to go to Aomori Yamada High School. Saga was an important player for the school, as they reached the semi-final of the All Japan High School Soccer Tournament in 2016 and won the competition in 2017 with a convincing 5–0 victory in the final. Saga started every game in the competition scoring three goals and scored his team's second goal in the final itself. Aomori Yamada also were champions of the Prince Takamado Cup U-18 Football League in 2016 after beating Sanfrecce Hiroshima Youth in the final, with Saga playing in every one of their games throughout the competition.

Following graduation from high school in 2017, Saga went on to Sendai University. In his third year, he was appointed captain and was part of the team that both beat JFL team Iwaki FC in the first round of the Emperor's Cup where he scored their second goal and narrowly lost in the second round to J2 League club Yokohama FC.

== Club career ==
=== Iwaki FC ===
In December 2020, it was announced that Saga would be signing for JFL team Iwaki FC for the 2021 season. He made his debut for the team in March in a 2–1 league victory over Veertien Mie and scored his first goal in a 1–1 draw with ReinMeer Aomori. At the end of the 2021 season, Saga had participated in all 32 games and scored 8 goals, helping Iwaki FC gain promotion to the J3 League. He was named as Rookie of the Year and was also inducted into the 2021 JFL Best XI.

In the 2022 season, Saga scored on his J.League debut in a 1–1 draw with Kagoshima United. Another excellent season ensued for him as he helped Iwaki to back-to-back promotions, playing in all 34 of their league games and scoring 5 goals. For the second season running, Saga was inducted into the league's Best XI.

In the 2023 season, Saga only made 20 appearances but did score his first J2 League goal in a 3–2 loss to Fujieda MYFC. His playing time was further reduced in the 2024 season, only making seven appearances in the first half of the season.

=== Fagiano Okayama ===
On 7 July 2024, Saga transferred to fellow J2 League club, Fagiano Okayama mid-way through the 2024 season. On 7 December 2024, he helped his club secure promotion to the J1 League for the first time in their history, following a 2–0 victory over Vegalta Sendai in the promotion play-off final.

In his first full season with the club in 2025, Saga made his J1 League debut in a 1–0 league to defeat to Yokohama FC. However, he went on only to make two more appearances throughout the season.

=== Loan to Kagoshima United ===
In December 2025, it was announced Saga would be joining Kagoshima United ahead of the J2–J3 100 Year Vision League. He scored on his debut, in a 3–2 defeat to Tegevajaro Miyazaki.

== Career statistics ==
As of 3 March 2026.

Appearances and goals by club, season and competition
Club	Season	League			Emperor's Cup		J.League Cup		Total	
Club	Season	Division	Apps	Goals	Apps	Goals	Apps	Goals	Apps	Goals
Sendai University	2019	–			2	1	–		2	1
Iwaki FC	2021	JFL	32	8	1	0	–		33	8
Iwaki FC	2022	J3 League	34	5	0	0	–		34	5
Iwaki FC	2023	J2 League	20	1	0	0	–		20	1
Iwaki FC	2024	J2 League	6	0	0	0	1	0	7	0
Iwaki FC	Total		92	14	1	0	1	0	94	14
Fagiano Okayama	2024	J2 League	6	0	0	0	0	0	6	0
Fagiano Okayama	2025	J1 League	2	0	0	0	1	0	3	0
Fagiano Okayama	Total		8	0	0	0	1	0	9	0
Kagoshima United (loan)	2026	J2/J3 (100)	4	1	0	0	0	0	4	1
Career total			104	15	3	1	2	0	109	16

== Honours ==
Iwaki FC

- Japan Football League : 2021
- J3 League : 2022

Fagiano Okayama

- J2 League Promotion play-off winner: 2024

Individual

- JFL Rookie of the Year: 2021
- JFL Best XI: 2021
- J3 League Best XI: 2022

== Personal life ==
Saga's first child was born in September 2025.
