= Shugo Tsuji =

Japanese footballer

Shugo Tsuji 辻 周吾
Personal information
- Date of birth: 21 July 1997 (age 29)
- Place of birth: Chiba, Japan
- Height: 1.87 m (6 ft 2 in)
- Position: Goalkeeper

Team information
- Current team: Ehime FC
- Number: 30

Youth career
- 2010–2015: JEF United Chiba

Senior career*
Years	Team	Apps	(Gls)
2016–2018	Sagan Tosu	0	(0)
2018	→ Yokohama FC (loan)	10	(0)
2019	Yokohama FC	0	(0)
2020–	Ehime FC	91	(0)
- * Club domestic league appearances and goals as of 17 August 2026

Shugo Tsuji (辻 周吾, Tsuji Shūgo; born 21 July 1997) is a Japanese professional footballer who plays as a goalkeeper for Ehime FC.

== Honours ==
Ehime FC

- J3 League: 2023

Individual

- J3 League Best XI: 2023
