= Kagoshima United FC =

Japanese football club

Kagoshima United 鹿児島ユナイテッド
- Full name: Kagoshima United Football Club
- Nicknames: Yokanise Eleven よかにせイレブン
- Founded: 1959; 67 years ago as Volca Kagoshima; 1994; 32 years ago as FC Kagoshima; 2014; 12 years ago as Kagoshima United
- Stadium: Shiranami Stadium; Kagoshima
- Capacity: 19,934
- Chairman: Tsuyoshi Tokushige, Kenichiro Yuwaki (co-owners)
- Manager: Naoki Soma
- League: J3 League
- 2025: J3 League, 5th of 20
- Website: kufc.co.jp
Home colours	Away colours

Kagoshima United FC (鹿児島ユナイテッドFC, Kagoshima Yunaiteddo Efushī) is a Japanese professional football club based in Kagoshima, Capital of Kagoshima Prefecture, Japan. That was formed from the merger of Volca Kagoshima and FC Kagoshima. Both clubs played in the Kyushu Soccer League before the merger. Their top team is set to play in the J3 League from 2025, Japanese third tier of professional league football after relegation from J2 in 2024. Their secondary team plays in the Kagoshima Prefectural League as Kagoshima United FC SECOND.

== History ==
=== Origins (1959–2013) ===
Volca Kagoshima was established in 1959 as Kagoshima Teachers' Soccer Club. The club was a founding member of the Kyushu Soccer League in 1973. Since the league's inception, the club had always played in this league and never be relegated to the Prefectural Leagues until the merge with FC Kagoshima in 2014. They advanced to the Regional League promotion series five times, but never succeeded to promote to the upper tier, Japan Football League, known as the highest level for amateur club football in the country. The club changed the name from Kagoshima Teachers to Volca Kagoshima in 1995.

FC Kagoshima was established in 1994 as an affiliated club of the National Institute of Fitness and Sports in Kanoya. They were promoted to the Kyushu Soccer League as early as 2004 and changed the name to Osumi NIFS United FC.

Both of Volca and NIFS have been seeking the way to promote to the JFL separately. The idea of a merged club of Volca and FC Kagoshima (renamed from NIFS in 2010) had been discussed by the Kagoshima Prefectural Football Association as early as 2012, however, it was failed to reach an agreement at that time. Although Volca and FC Kagoshima had applied for J.League Associate Membership separately, both sides restarted their talk about the merger, then finally agreed with merging their clubs to aim promotion to the J.League, in response of the advisory by the J.League organization. As both clubs had advanced to the final round of the Regional League promotion series in 2013, the merged club earned the promotion to the JFL of 2014.

=== Kagoshima United (2014–) ===
The two clubs, Volca Kagoshima and FC Kagoshima, were merged in 2014 to form Kagoshima United. In November 2015, after finishing promotion zone in 2015, they received J.League license to participate in the J3 League.

In 2018, Kagoshima United was promoted to the J2 League for the first time in history from 2019 after five years at the J3.

In 2019, Kagoshima United was instantly relegated back to the J3, after a 21st-place finish in their J3 debut season.

On 2 December 2023, Kagoshima United secure promotion to J2 League from 2024 after draw against Gainare Tottori 1–1 and back to second tier after 4 years since 2019.

On 27 October 2024, Kagoshima United officially relegated to J3 League after defeat from V-Varen Nagasaki 4-1 and ending one year in second tier.

== Rivalries ==
The traditional rival of Kagoshima United is Roasso Kumamoto, the prefectural neighbours and former Kyushu Soccer League fellows since 1983 until 2005, except 2001–2002. Matches between the two clubs are labelled Hisatsu derby (肥薩ダービー, "Kumamoto-Kagoshima derby") and generate a lot of interest in both prefectures.

== League & cup record ==
Champions	Runners-up	Third place	Promoted	Relegated

League														J. League Cup	Emperor's Cup
Season	Div.	Teams	Tier	Pos.	P	W	D	L	F	A	GD	Pts	Attendance/G	J. League Cup	Emperor's Cup
As Kagoshima United
2014	JFL	14	4	3rd	26	18	3	5	45	19	26	57	1,825	Not eligible	2nd round
2015	JFL	16	4	3rd	30	18	6	6	46	25	21	60	2,624	Not eligible	1st round
2016	J3	16	3	5th	30	15	5	10	39	29	10	50	3,665	Not eligible	1st round
2017	J3	17	3	4th	32	17	4	11	49	37	12	55	3,508	Not eligible	2nd round
2018	J3	17	3	2nd	32	16	9	7	46	35	11	57	4,040	Not eligible	2nd round
2019	J2	22	2	21st	42	11	7	24	41	73	-32	40	5,783	Not eligible	2nd round
2020 †	J3	18	3	4th	34	18	4	12	55	43	12	58	2,214	Not eligible	Did not qualify
2021 †	J3	15	3	7th	28	11	7	10	34	35	-1	40	3,737	Not eligible	2nd round
2022	J3	18	3	3rd	34	21	3	10	55	39	16	66	4,740	Not eligible	2nd round
2023	J3	20	3	2nd	38	18	8	12	58	41	17	62	5,567	Not eligible	1st round
2024	J2	20	2	19th	38	7	9	22	35	59	-24	30	6,596	2nd round	2nd round
2025	J3	20	3	5th	38	18	12	8	69	44	25	66	6,860	1st round	2nd round
2026	J3	40	3	5th	18	8	5	5	23	15	8	33	6,980	N/A	N/A
2026-27	J3	20	3	TBD	38									TBD	TBD

Key

- Pos. = Position in league; P = Games played; W = Games won; D = Games drawn; L = Games lost; F = Goals scored; A = Goals conceded; GD = Goals difference; Pts = Points gained
- Attendance/G = Average home league attendance
- † 2020 & 2021 seasons attendances reduced by COVID-19 worldwide pandemic
- Source: J.League Data Site

== Honours ==
Volca Kagoshima (1959–2013) FC Kagoshima (1994–2013) Kagoshima United (2014–)

Kagoshima United FC honours
Honour	No.	Years
Kyushu Soccer League	4	1974, 1986, 2012, 2013
Kagoshima Prefectural Football Championship and Emperor's Cup Kagoshima Prefectural Qualifiers	9	2014, 2015, 2016, 2017, 2018, 2021, 2022, 2023, 2025

== League history ==
- Regional (Kyushu): 1973–2013
- Division 4 (JFL): 2014–2015
- Division 3 (J3): 2016–2018
- Division 2 (J2): 2019
- Division 3 (J3): 2020–2023
- Division 2 (J2): 2024
- Division 3 (J3): 2025–

== Current squad ==
As of 1 August 2026.

Note: Flags indicate national team as defined under FIFA eligibility rules; some limited exceptions apply. Players may hold more than one non-FIFA nationality.

No.	Pos.	Nation	Player
1	GK	JPN	Takumi Kumakura
2	MF	JPN	Riku Saga
4	DF	JPN	Kenta Hirose
5	DF	JPN	Yuto Yamada (on loan from Iwaki FC)
6	DF	JPN	Atsuki Satsukawa (on loan from Oita Trinita)
7	MF	JPN	Wataru Tanaka
8	MF	JPN	Keita Fujimura
9	FW	JPN	Ryo Arita
10	FW	JPN	Seiya Take
11	MF	JPN	Mikuto Fukuda
13	DF	JPN	Yuto Nagamine
14	MF	JPN	Koki Yoshio (on loan from Fagiano Okayama)
16	DF	JPN	Kota Muramatsu
18	FW	JPN	Keito Kawamura
19	FW	JPN	Shuto Inaba

No.	Pos.	Nation	Player
20	MF	JPN	Masayoshi Endo
21	GK	JPN	Kohei Kawakami (on loan from Fagiano Okayama)
22	FW	JPN	Aura Takahashi (on loan from Fagiano Okayama)
27	DF	JPN	Kosuke Kawashima
31	GK	JPN	Daiki Sakata
32	MF	JPN	Kaito Umeki
33	MF	JPN	Rin Yamazaki
35	DF	JPN	Genki Egawa
36	DF	JPN	Jurato Ikeda
44	DF	JPN	Yoshitaka Aoki
55	FW	JPN	Keigo Nakayama
73	DF	KOR	Kim Moon-hyeon (on loan from Avispa Fukuoka)
77	MF	BRA	Thales (on loan from Tokushima Vortis)
99	FW	ESP	Juanma Delgado

=== Out on loan ===
Note: Flags indicate national team as defined under FIFA eligibility rules; some limited exceptions apply. Players may hold more than one non-FIFA nationality.

No.	Pos.	Nation	Player
23	DF	JPN	Rinshiro Kojima (at Veertien Mie)
41	MF	JPN	Naoya Mishina (at Roasso Kumamoto)

== Coaching staff ==
KUFC Coaching staff for 2025.

Position	Name
Manager	Naoki Soma
Coaches	Naotsugu Obata; Daisuke Asahi; Naoaki Morinaga
Goalkeeper coach	Masataka Sasaki
Physical coach	Yuki Shimizu
Chief trainer	Tomoaki Mikiya
Trainer	Ryuki Takee; Sota Watanabe
Interpreter & Chief manager	Tsuyoshi Tame
General manager	Sena Abematsu; Suguru Shibahara

== Managerial history ==
Manager	Nationality	Tenure	
Manager	Nationality	Start	Finish
Takeshi Okubo	Japan	1 February 2014	31 January 2015
Tetsuya Asano	Japan	1 January 2015	31 December 2016
Yasutoshi Miura	Japan	1 January 2017	31 January 2019
Kim Jong-song	North Korea	1 February 2019	31 January 2021
Arthur Papas	Australia	1 February 2021	28 May 2021
Yasuaki Ōshima	Japan	28 May 2021	3 July 2021
Nobuhiro Ueno	Japan	4 July 2021	31 January 2022
Naoto Otake	Japan	1 February 2022	22 August 2023
Yasuaki Oshima	Japan	23 August 2023	26 May 2024
Tetsuya Asano	Japan	28 May 2024	present

== Crest and colours ==
The club crest has the illustrations of Sakurajima and Kagoshima Bay, both symbolize Kagoshima Prefecture, on its background design, with red colour, which represents Volca, and light blue colour, represents FC Kagoshima.

== Kit evolution ==
Kagoshima United's club colours are white and navy.

Home kit – 1st
2014	2015	2016	2017	2018
2019	2020	2021	2022	2023
2024	2025	2026 -		

Away kit – 2nd
2014	2015	2016	2017	2018
2019	2020	2021	2022	2023
2024	2025	2026 -		
