= Iwaki FC =

Japanese football club

Iwaki いわきFC
- Full name: Iwaki Football Club
- Founded: 2012; 14 years ago
- Ground: Hawaiians Stadium Iwaki; Iwaki, Fukushima
- Capacity: 5,600
- Chairman: Satoshi Okura
- Manager: Kazuaki Tasaka
- League: J2 League
- 2025: J2 League, 9th of 20
- Website: iwakifc.com
Home colours	Away colours

Iwaki FC (いわきFC, Iwaki Efushi) is a professional football club based in Iwaki, a city in Fukushima Prefecture, Japan. The club competes in the J2 League, the second tier of the Japanese football league system.

== History ==
=== Foundation ===
Iwaki FC was founded in 2012, before getting official recognition in 2013 with the creation of their homonymous corporation. The club name got more attention when Under Armour decided to support them in climbing the Japanese football pyramid from the bottom. The vision behind the club's formation, was an intention of "making Iwaki the central football-city in Tohoku". In service of this, a new training field opened in November 2016 and the club-house was just launched in May 2017: two central structures necessary to rise to the top of Japanese football.

=== Fukushima Prefectural Football League (2013–2017) ===
Results during this period supported Iwaki FC's rise, as they won several titles in the Fukushima Prefectural Football League, eventually joining the first division. Their next target was the Tohoku Soccer League. Meanwhile, the club achieved their first win at the 23rd National Club Team Football Championship Tournament (winning by 9–0). Iwaki FC also debuted at the Emperor's Cup in 2017 edition. After defeating Norbritz Hokkaido in the first round, they surprisingly overcame Hokkaido Consadole Sapporo by 5–2 after extra-time. They lost against Shimizu S-Pulse in the third round.

=== Tohoku Soccer League (2018–2019) ===
First advancing to the Tohoku Soccer League in 2018, Iwaki FC earned promotion to the following year's JFL for the first time in 2019. The club won the All Japan Regional Promotion Series.

=== Japan Football League (JFL) (2020–2021) ===
Joining the Japan Football League for the 2020 season, in the 2021 season, Iwaki FC finished in first position in the JFL competition, earning promotion to the following year's J3 League.

=== J. League (2022–) ===
In the 2022 season, their first year in the J3 League, Iwaki FC received a J2 League license on 28 October 2022, and become eligible for promotion. On 6 November, they were crowned the J3 League champions, earning promotion to the following year's J2 League. They secured the league title in the 32nd round, following a 3–0 win against Kagoshima United. Iwaki FC ended their 2022 season with 78 points from 34 matches. On 26 September 2023, Iwaki FC was declared to have met the requirements to obtain a license up to the J1 League.

== Stadium ==
Iwaki FC played at J-Village Stadium in Hirono during the 2022 J3 season. However, following their promotion to the J2 League, they now use Hawaiians Stadium Iwaki, located in Iwaki.

On 25 September 2025, Iwaki FC announce new stadium name Iwaki Stadium Labo. Construction has been start from November 2027 and complete in 2031.

== League and cup record ==
Champions	Runners-up	Third place	Promoted	Relegated

League														J. League Cup	Emperor's Cup	Shakaijin Cup
Season	Division	Tier	Teams	Pos.	P	W	D	L	F	A	GD	Pts	Attendance/G	J. League Cup	Emperor's Cup	Shakaijin Cup
2013	Fukushima Prefectural; Football League (Div. 3 West)	8	6	2nd	10	5	3	2	30	13	17	18		Not eligible		
2014	Fukushima Prefectural; Football League (Div. 3 West)	9	5	3rd	8	3	1	4	17	15	2	10		Not eligible		
2015	Fukushima Prefectural; Football League (Div. 3 East)	9	6	1st	10	10	0	0	41	9	32	30		Not eligible		
2016	Fukushima Prefectural; Football League (Div. 2)	8	6	1st	10	10	0	0	93	1	92	30		Not eligible	Did not qualify	Quarter final
2017	Fukushima Prefectural; Football League (Div. 1)	7	6	1st	10	10	0	0	93	0	93	30		Not eligible	3rd round	2nd round
2018	Tohoku Soccer; League (Div. 2 South)	6	10	1st	18	18	0	0	139	12	127	54		Not eligible	1st round	3rd
2019	Tohoku Soccer; League (Div. 1)	5	10	1st	18	15	3	0	82	14	68	48		Not eligible	1st round	3rd
2020	Japan Football; League	4	16	7th	15	6	3	6	24	24	0	21	1,125	Not eligible	2nd round	Not eligible
2021	Japan Football; League	4	17	1st	32	21	8	3	65	28	37	71	1,130	Not eligible	1st round	Not eligible
2022	J3 League	3	18	1st	34	23	7	4	72	23	49	76	2,174	Not eligible	Did not qualify	Not eligible
2023	J2 League	2	22	18th	42	12	11	19	45	69	-24	47	3,490	Not eligible	2nd round	Not eligible
2024	J2 League	2	20	9th	38	15	9	14	53	41	12	54	4,290	2nd round	3rd round	Not eligible
2025	J2 League	2	20	9th	38	15	11	12	55	44	11	56	4,371	1st round	2nd round	Not eligible
2026	J2 League	2	40	10th	18	7	6	5	22	18	4	31	4,189	N/A		Not eligible
2026–27	J2 League	2	20	TBD	38									TBD	TBD	Not eligible

Key

- Pos. = Position in league; P = Games played; W = Games won; D = Games drawn; L = Games lost; F = Goals scored; A = Goals conceded; GD = Goals difference; Pts = Points gained

== Honours ==
Iwaki FC Honours
Honour	No.	Years
Fukushima Prefectural Adult Soccer League Division 3 East Block	1	2015
National Club Team Football Championship Tournament	2	2016, 2017
Fukushima Prefecture Adult Soccer League Division 2	1	2016
Fukushima Prefecture Adult Soccer League Division 1	1	2017
Fukushima Prefectural Football Championship Emperor's Cup Fukushima Prefectural Qualifiers	4	2017, 2018, 2019, 2021
Tohoku Adult Soccer League Division 2 South	1	2018
Tohoku Adult Soccer League Division 1	1	2019
Japanese Regional Football Champions League	1	2019
Japan Football League JFL	1	2021
J3 League	1	2022

== Current squad ==
As of 1 August 2026.

Note: Flags indicate national team as defined under FIFA eligibility rules; some limited exceptions apply. Players may hold more than one non-FIFA nationality.

No.	Pos.	Nation	Player
1	GK	JPN	Yuki Kato
2	MF	JPN	Ibuki Konno
3	DF	JPN	Ryo Endo (captain)
4	DF	JPN	Takeshi Ushizawa (on loan from Mito HollyHock)
5	DF	JPN	Taisei Kuwata (on loan from Kashiwa Reysol)
6	DF	JPN	Wataru Iwashita
7	MF	JPN	Shun Nakajima (on loan from Kashiwa Reysol)
8	MF	JPN	Sōsuke Shibata
9	FW	JPN	Yutaka Michiwaki (on loan from Avispa Fukuoka)
10	FW	JPN	Ryo Nishitani
11	FW	JPN	Taisei Kato
13	MF	JPN	Kaito Fujii (on loan from Fagiano Okayama)
14	MF	JPN	Daiki Yamaguchi
15	DF	JPN	Haruto Nakano
16	MF	JPN	Masato Araki
19	MF	KOR	Jeon Seoho

No.	Pos.	Nation	Player
20	MF	JPN	Rinshu Ouji
21	GK	JPN	Ryota Matsumoto
22	MF	JPN	Yuriya Takahashi
23	GK	JPN	Masato Sasaki (on loan from Kashiwa Reysol)
27	MF	JPN	Atsuki Yamanaka
28	MF	JPN	Ruon Hisanaga
29	FW	JPN	Kanta Tanaka
30	MF	JPN	Shota Kofie (on loan from Sanfrecce Hiroshima)
35	DF	JPN	Soichiro Fukaminato
37	DF	JPN	Shuto Okaniwa (on loan from Shonan Bellmare)
38	FW	JPN	Naoki Kumata (on loan from FC Tokyo)
39	GK	KOR	Joo Hyun-jin
40	MF	JPN	Ryota Nagaki
41	MF	JPN	Ruka Matsumoto ^{DSP}
42	MF	JPN	Ryunosuke Nakayama ^{DSP}
45	FW	JPN	Toranosuke Ishi ^{Type 2}

=== Out on loan ===
Note: Flags indicate national team as defined under FIFA eligibility rules; some limited exceptions apply. Players may hold more than one non-FIFA nationality.

No.	Pos.	Nation	Player
—	MF	JPN	Kanta Sakagishi (at Kōchi United)
25	DF	JPN	Hikaru Sakamoto (at Kōchi United)
33	DF	KOR	Hyun Woo-bin (at Veroskronos Tsuno)
37	DF	JPN	Yuto Yamada (at Kagoshima United FC)

No.	Pos.	Nation	Player
—	DF	JPN	Jin Ikoma (at Giravanz Kitakyushu)
26	FW	JPN	Iori Sakamoto (at Reilac Shiga FC)
—	FW	JPN	Yoshihito Kondo (at Tochigi SC)
—	FW	JPN	Keita Shirawachi (at Zweigen Kanazawa)

== Club officials ==
As of 13 September 2026

Position	Name
Manager	(Japan) Kazuaki Tasaka
Head coach	(Japan) Takumi Watanabe
Coach	(Japan) Ryo Iizuka
Coach	(Japan) Sotari Izumi
Coach	(Japan) Shintaro Matsuo
Goalkeeper coach	(Japan) Hiroyuki Matsumoto
Physical coach	(Japan) Tsubada Hisanaga
Technical staff	(Japan) Yuta Murakami
Executive officer	(Japan) Satoshi Okura
Operations officer	(Japan) Yuna Iwasaki
Press officer	(Japan) Rin Yanagisawa

== Managerial history ==
As of 9 September 2026

Manager	Nationality	Tenure	
Manager	Nationality	Start	Finish
Pieter Huistra	Netherlands	13 January 2016	31 December 2016
Yuzo Tamura	Japan	1 February 2017	31 January 2021
Hiromasa Suguri	Japan	1 February 2022	14 June 2023
Yuzo Tamura	Japan	15 June 2023	7 September 2026
Kazuaki Tasaka	Japan	9 September 2026	Present

== Kit evolution ==
Home kit - 1st
2017	2018	2019	2020	2021
2022	2023	2024	2025 -	

Away kit - 2nd
2017	2018	2019	2020	2021
2022	2023	2024	2025 -	

Third / special kits
2023; Limited	2024; Limited
