= 2024 Iwaki FC season =

Iwaki FC
2024 season
- Chairman: Satoshi Okura
- Manager: Yuzo Tamura
- Stadium: Hawaiians Stadium Iwaki (Iwaki, Fukushima)
- J2 League: 9th
- Emperor's Cup: Third round
- J.League Cup: First round
- Top goalscorer: League: Kaina Tanimura (18 goals); All: Kaina Tanimura (18 goals)
Home colours	Away colours

The 2024 season was the 12th season in the existence of Iwaki FC. It is the club's second season in the J2 League, the second tier of Japanese football. As well as the domestic league, they competed in the Emperor's Cup and the J.League Cup, the latter for the first time in their history.

== Squad ==
=== Season squad ===
Squad no.	Name	Nationality	Date of birth (age at start of season)
Goalkeepers
1	Kengo Tanaka (captain)	(Japan)	30 December 1989 (aged 34)
21	Kotaro Tachikawa	(Japan)	4 January 1997 (aged 27)
31	Shuhei Shikano	(Japan)	27 August 1999 (aged 24)
39	Joo Hyun-jin	(South Korea)	6 February 2005 (aged 19)
Defenders
2	Yusuke Ishida	(Japan)	11 November 2002 (aged 21)
5	Shuhei Hayami	(Japan)	11 November 2000 (aged 23)
22	Jin Ikoma	(Japan)	1 July 1999 (aged 24)
27	Kazuki Dohana	(Japan)	5 December 1998 (aged 25)
32	Sena Igarashi	(Japan)	13 April 2002 (aged 21)
33	Hyun Woo-bin	(South Korea)	17 January 2006 (aged 18)
34	Rio Omori	(Japan)	21 July 2002 (aged 21)
Midfielders
6	Kanta Sakagishi	(Japan)	18 January 2002 (aged 22)
7	Jun Nishikawa	(Japan)	21 February 2002 (aged 22)
8	Sosuke Shibata	(Japan)	26 May 2001 (aged 22)
14	Daiki Yamaguchi	(Japan)	2 November 1997 (aged 26)
15	Naoki Kase	(Japan)	7 June 2000 (aged 23)
19	Yusuke Onishi	(Japan)	20 May 2001 (aged 22)
20	Yuma Kato	(Japan)	15 December 2001 (aged 22)
23	Rui Osako	(Japan)	13 October 2004 (aged 19)
24	Yuto Yamashita	(Japan)	24 May 1996 (aged 27)
40	Yoshihiro Shimoda	(Japan)	4 May 2004 (aged 19)
Forwards
9	Yoshihito Kondo	(Japan)	3 March 2002 (aged 21)
10	Kotaro Arima	(Japan)	3 September 2000 (aged 23)
11	Keita Buwanika	(Japan)	16 December 2002 (aged 21)
17	Kaina Tanimura	(Japan)	5 March 1998 (aged 25)
18	Keita Shirawachi	(Japan)	7 December 2001 (aged 22)
28	Ryo Tanada	(Japan)	19 June 2003 (aged 20)
30	Reo Sugiyama	(Japan)	4 March 2000 (aged 23)
38	Naoki Kumata	(Japan)	2 August 2004 (aged 19)

Last updated: 20 August 2024.
Source: Iwaki FC website

== Transfers ==
=== Arrivals ===
Date	Position	Player	From	Type	Source
24 December 2022	MF	(Japan) Yuma Kato	(Japan) Takushoku University	Full	
24 December 2022	DF	(Japan) Yuma Tsujioka	(Japan) International Pacific University	Full	
24 December 2022	FW	(Japan) Yoshihito Kondo	(Japan) Nagoya Gakuin University	Full	
10 July 2023	FW	(Japan) Keita Shirawachi	(Japan) Toin University of Yokohama	Full	
29 September 2023	MF	(Japan) Kanta Sakagishi	(Japan) Niigata University of Health and Welfare	Full	
23 October 2023	MF	(Japan) Yusuke Onishi	(Japan) Kokushikan University	Full	
14 December 2023	DF	(Japan) Jin Ikoma	(Japan) Renofa Yamaguchi	Full	
15 December 2023	GK	(Japan) Kotaro Tachikawa	(Japan) Shonan Bellmare	Full	
15 December 2023	MF	(Japan) Rui Osako	(Japan) Cerezo Osaka	Loan	
15 December 2023	GK	(South Korea) Joo Hyun-jin	(South Korea) Daedong Taxation High School	Full	
20 December 2023	DF	(Japan) Hayato Teruyama	(Japan) FC Imabari	Full	
21 December 2023	DF	(Japan) Rio Omori	(Japan) FC Tokyo	Loan	
22 December 2023	FW	(Japan) Ryo Tanada	(Japan) Sanfrecce Hiroshima	Loan	
22 December 2023	DF	(South Korea) Park Jun-yeong	(South Korea) Ansan Greeners	Full	
28 December 2023	FW	(Japan) Keita Buwanika	(Japan) JEF United Chiba	Full	
6 January 2024	MF	(Japan) Jun Nishikawa	(Japan) Cerezo Osaka	Loan	
9 July 2024	DF	(Japan) Kazuki Dohana	(Japan) Fukushima United FC	Full	
12 July 2024	DF	(Japan) Sena Igarashi	(Japan) Toin University of Yokohama	Full	
6 August 2024	MF	(Japan) Sosuke Shibata	(Japan) Shonan Bellmare	Loan	
9 August 2024	FW	(Japan) Naoki Kumata	(Japan) FC Tokyo	Loan	
20 August 2024	DF	(South Korea) Hyun Woo-bin	(South Korea) Sejong Future High School	Full	

=== Departures ===
Date	Position	Player	To	Type	Source
27 November 2023	MF	(Japan) Kiwara Miyazaki	(Japan) Fagiano Okayama	Loan return	
9 December 2023	FW	(Japan) Daigo Furukawa	(Japan) FC Osaka	Full	
9 December 2023	DF	(Japan) Genki Egawa	(Japan) FC Osaka	Full	
9 December 2023	DF	(Japan) Tomoki Yoshida	(Japan) Kochi United SC	Full	
13 December 2023	MF	(Japan) Eiji Miyamoto	(Japan) Iwaki FC	Full	
13 December 2023	DF	(Japan) Ryo Endo	(Japan) Iwaki FC	Loan return	
14 December 2023	GK	(Japan) Toru Takagiwa	(Japan) Tokyo Verdy	Loan return	
14 December 2023	MF	(Japan) Asahi Haga	(Japan) FC Osaka	Loan	
14 December 2023	DF	(Japan) Yuma Tsujioka	(Japan) Tegevajaro Miyazaki	Loan	
15 December 2023	DF	(Japan) Rei Ieizumi	(Japan) Iwaki FC	Full	
15 December 2023	MF	(Japan) Hiroto Iwabuchi	(Japan) Fagiano Okayama	Full	
15 December 2023	FW	(Japan) Ryo Arita	(Japan) Montedio Yamagata	Full	
22 December 2023	MF	(Japan) Sota Nagai	(Japan) Tokyo Verdy	Full	
22 December 2023	DF	(Japan) Takumi Kawamura	(Japan) Tokyo Verdy	Full	
29 December 2023	FW	(Japan) Shu Yoshizawa	(Japan) Tegevajaro Miyazaki	Full	
6 January 2024	MF	(Brazil) Nélson Henrique	(Portugal) SC Praiense	Loan return	
13 January 2024	MF	(Japan) Wataru Kuromiya	(Japan) Fukuyama City FC	Full	
7 July 2024	DF	(Japan) Hayato Teruyama	(Japan) V-Varen Nagasaki	Full	
7 July 2024	DF	(Japan) Riku Saga	(Japan) Fagiano Okayama	Full	
19 July 2024	FW	(Japan) Iori Sakamoto	(Japan) Blancdieu Hirosaki FC	Loan	
5 August 2024	DF	(South Korea) Park Jun-yeong		Contract terminated	
8 August 2024	MF	(Japan) Mizuki Kaburaki	(Japan) Vanraure Hachinohe	Loan	

== Pre-season and friendlies ==
28 January Training match	Iwaki FC	5–4	NIFS Kanoya	Kagoshima
		Report		Stadium: Kagoshima Kenko-no-mori Park

31 January Training match	Iwaki FC	1–2	Fujieda MYFC	Kagoshima
		Report		Stadium: Kagoshima Kenko-no-mori Park
Note: The match consisted of three 45-minute halves

4 February Training match	Iwaki FC	4–2	Renofa Yamaguchi	Kagoshima
		Report		Stadium: Kagoshima Kenko-no-mori Park
Note: The match consisted of four 35-minute halves

== Competitions ==
=== J2 League ===
Pos	Team	Pld	W	D	L	GF	GA	GD	Pts
7	JEF United Chiba	38	19	4	15	67	48	+19	61
8	Tokushima Vortis	38	16	7	15	42	44	−2	55
9	Iwaki FC	38	15	9	14	53	41	+12	54
10	Blaublitz Akita	38	15	9	14	36	35	+1	54
11	Renofa Yamaguchi	38	15	8	15	43	44	−1	53

Source: Meiji Yasuda J2 League, J.League Data Site
Rules for classification: 1) Points; 2) Goal difference; 3) Goals scored; 4) Head-to-head points; 5) Head-to-head goal difference; 6) Head-to-head goal scored; 7) Fair-play points.

==== Results by matchday ====
Round	1	2	3	4	5	6	7	8	9	10	11	12	13	14	15	16	17	18	19	20	21	22	23	24	25	26	27	28	29	30	31	32	33	34	35	36	37	38
Ground	A	H	H	A	A	H	A	H	A	H	A	A	H	A	H	A	H	H	H	A	A	H	H	A	H	H	A	H	A	A	H	A	H	A	A	H	A	H
Result	L	D	W	W	D	D	L	W	D	L	W	W	W	D	L	W	D	L	D	W	L	L	L	W	W	W	W	L	L	W	L	W	D	D	L	L	L	W
Position	18	15	10	5	6	7	12	8	10	11	8	5	5	4	7	7	7	8	8	8	8	8	8	8	7	7	7	7	8	8	8	7	8	8	8	8	10	9

Updated to match(es) played on 10 November 2024. Source: J. League Data Site
A = Away; H = Home; W = Win; D = Draw; L = Loss

==== Matches ====
The full league fixtures were released on 23 January 2024.

24 February 1	Mito HollyHock	1–0	Iwaki FC	Mito
14:03 JST	Ando 25'	Report		Stadium: K's denki Stadium Mito; Attendance: 5,577; Referee: Shuhei Shimizu

3 March 2	Iwaki FC	1–1	Fagiano Okayama	Iwaki
13:03 JST	Tanimura 90+7'	Report	Tagami 45+1' (red card) 64'	Stadium: Hawaiians Stadium Iwaki; Attendance: 4,241; Referee: Atsushi Kamimura

9 March 3	Iwaki FC	3–1	Kagoshima United	Iwaki
14:03 JST	Tanimura 33', 61'; Yamashita 77'	Report	Yonezawa 46'	Stadium: Hawaiians Stadium Iwaki; Attendance: 3,599; Referee: Reo Tanaka

17 March 4	Roasso Kumamoto	0–6	Iwaki FC	Kumamoto
13:03 JST	Iwashita (yellow card) 45+2' (yellow-red card) 71'	Report	Teruyama 9', 70'; Kondo 28'; Tanimura 50'; Yamaguchi 75'; Arima 80'	Stadium: Egao Kenko Stadium; Attendance: 3,412; Referee: Tomohiro Inoue

20 March 5	Ventforet Kofu	1–1	Iwaki FC	Kōfu
14:03 JST	Torikai 13'	Report	Kondo 25'	Stadium: JIT Recycle Ink Stadium; Attendance: 7,790; Referee: Lewis Smith

24 March 6	Iwaki FC	0–0	Montedio Yamagata	Iwaki
14:03 JST		Report		Stadium: Hawaiians Stadium Iwaki; Attendance: 4,853; Referee: Koichiro Fukushima

30 March 7	Blaublitz Akita	1–0	Iwaki FC	Akita
14:03 JST	Kawano 16'	Report		Stadium: Soyu Stadium; Attendance: 2,509; Referee: Koki Nagamine

3 April 8	Iwaki FC	3–0	Fujieda MYFC	Iwaki
19:03 JST	Yamaguchi 29', 66'; Nishikawa 78' (pen.)	Report		Stadium: Hawaiians Stadium Iwaki; Attendance: 2,293; Referee: Takuto Okabe

7 April 9	Yokohama FC	2–2	Iwaki FC	Yokohama
14:03 JST	Ito 17'; Mita 49'	Report	Osako 16'; Teruyama 53' (pen.)	Stadium: NHK Spring Mitsuzawa Football Stadium; Attendance: 5,409; Referee: Koji Takasaki

13 April 10	Iwaki FC	2–3	Shimizu S-Pulse	Iwaki
16:03 JST	Nishikawa 22'; Tanimura 80'	Report	Lucas Braga 7'; Inui 9'; Kitagawa 68'	Stadium: Hawaiians Stadium Iwaki; Attendance: 5,038; Referee: Kazuyoshi Enomoto

21 April 11	Oita Trinita	0–2	Iwaki FC	Ōita
14:03 JST		Report	Kondo 59'; Teruyama 74'	Stadium: Resonac Dome Oita; Attendance: 8,748; Referee: Shuhei Shimizu

28 April 12	Tochigi SC	0–1	Iwaki FC	Utsunomiya
14:03 JST		Report	Tanimura 28'	Stadium: Kanseki Stadium Tochigi; Attendance: 6,434; Referee: Naoto Uehara

3 May 13	Iwaki FC	1–0	JEF United Chiba	Iwaki
16:04 JST	Arima 70'; Shimoda (yellow card) 57' (yellow-red card) 77'	Report		Stadium: Hawaiians Stadium Iwaki; Attendance: 5,025; Referee: Genki Tawara

6 May 14	Ehime FC	0–0	Iwaki FC	Matsuyama
15:03 JST		Report		Stadium: Ningineer Stadium; Attendance: 2,929; Referee: Tetsuro Yoshida

12 May 15	Iwaki FC	1–2	Renofa Yamaguchi	Iwaki
13:03 JST	Tanimura 23'	Report	Kawano 7'; Yamamoto 65'	Stadium: Hawaiians Stadium Iwaki; Attendance: 3,457; Referee: Yuzo Sutani

18 May 16	Thespa Gunma	0–1	Iwaki FC	Maebashi
14:03 JST		Report	Yamaguchi 61'	Stadium: Shoda Shoyu Stadium Gunma; Attendance: 3,690; Referee: Yosuke Kubota

26 May 17	Iwaki FC	1–1	Tokushima Vortis	Iwaki
14:03 JST	Tanimura 22'	Report	Mori 45+3'	Stadium: Hawaiians Stadium Iwaki; Attendance: 3,707; Referee: Reo Tanaka

2 June 18	Iwaki FC	1–2	Vegalta Sendai	Iwaki
13:03 JST	Tanimura 46'	Report	Takada 6'; Onaiwu 52'	Stadium: Hawaiians Stadium Iwaki; Attendance: 4,849; Referee: Keisuke Nobori

16 June 19	Iwaki FC	1–1	Ventforet Kofu	Iwaki
16:03 JST	Arima 19'	Report	Utaka 64'	Stadium: Hawaiians Stadium Iwaki; Attendance: 4,060; Referee: Shuhei Shimizu
Note: Matchweek 20

22 June 20	Renofa Yamaguchi FC	0–3	Iwaki FC	Yamaguchi
16:03 JST		Report	Tanimura 56'; Arima 59', 66' (pen.)	Stadium: Ishin Me-Life Stadium; Attendance: 3,302; Referee: Yusuke Ohashi
Note: Matchweek 21

26 June 21	V-Varen Nagasaki	3–1	Iwaki FC	Isahaya
19:03 JST	Kasayanagi 49'; Kato 57'; Juanma 84'	Report	Omori 66'	Stadium: Nagasaki Athletic Stadium; Attendance: 3,702; Referee: Koki Nagamine
Note: Matchweek 19

29 June 22	Iwaki FC	0–4	Yokohama FC	Iwaki
18:03 JST		Report	Nduka 31'; Ogawa 62'; Caprini 66'; Murata 90+2'	Stadium: Hawaiians Stadium Iwaki; Attendance: 4,796; Referee: Hirokazu Otsubo

6 July 23	Iwaki FC	0–1	Oita Trinita	Iwaki
18:03 JST		Report	Kim Hyun-woo 90+2'	Stadium: Hawaiians Stadium Iwaki; Attendance: 3,807; Referee: Naoto Uehara

14 July 24	Montedio Yamagata	1–2	Iwaki FC	Tendō
19:03 JST	Takahashi 90+3'	Report	Dohana 42'; Tanimura 56'	Stadium: ND Soft Stadium; Attendance: 9,670; Referee: Genkia Taware

4 August 25	Iwaki FC	2–0	Blaublitz Akita	Iwaki
18:04 JST	Tanimura 4', 69'	Report	Saito (red card) 39'	Stadium: Hawaiians Stadium Iwaki; Attendance: 3,900; Referee: Hayato Shimizu

10 August 26	Iwaki FC	2–1	Ehime FC	Iwaki
18:03 JST	Tanimura 21'; Tanioka 82' (o.g.)	Report	Sota 39'	Stadium: Hawaiians Stadium Iwaki; Attendance: 4,423; Referee: Shuhei Ishimaru

17 August 27	JEF United Chiba	0–3	Iwaki FC	Chiba
19:03 JST		Report	Tanimura 64'; Arima 72'; Mendes 74' (o.g.)	Stadium: Fukuda Denshi Arena; Attendance: 10,879; Referee: Hiroyuki Kimura

25 August 28	Iwaki FC	3–4	Roasso Kumamoto	Iwaki
18:03 JST	Yamaguchi 25'; Arima 52'; Kumata 74'	Report	Ishikawa 13', 49'; Ezaki 36'; Iwashita 68'	Stadium: Hawaiians Stadium Iwaki; Attendance: 3,668; Referee: Keisuke Nobori

31 August 29	Vegalta Sendai	2–0	Iwaki FC	Sendai
19:03 JST	Nakajima 8', 73'	Report		Stadium: Yurtec Stadium Sendai; Attendance: 14,773; Referee: Shu Kawamata

7 September 30	Kagoshima United	1–3	Iwaki FC	Kagoshima
19:03 JST	Fujimoto 90+2'	Report	Nishikawa 30'; Tanimura 39', 58'	Stadium: Shiranami Stadium; Attendance: 7,511; Referee: Yosuke Kubota

15 September 31	Iwaki FC	0–2	V-Varen Nagasaki	Iwaki
16:04 JST		Report	Matheus Jesus 38'; Tanaka 73'	Stadium: Hawaiians Stadium Iwaki; Attendance: 4,759; Referee: Koji Takasaki

22 September 32	Tokushima Vortis	0–1	Iwaki FC	Naruto
18:04 JST		Report	Arima 51'	Stadium: Pocarisweat Stadium; Attendance: 5,051; Referee: Hirokazu Otsubo

29 September 33	Iwaki FC	0–0	Tochigi SC	Iwaki
15:33 JST		Report		Stadium: Hawaiians Stadium Iwaki; Attendance: 5,056; Referee: Koichiro Fukushima

5 October 34	Fujieda MYFC	1–1	Iwaki FC	Fujieda
17:03 JST	Yamura 16'	Report	Arima 88'	Stadium: Fujieda Soccer Stadium; Attendance: 3,789; Referee: Kazuyoshi Enomoto

20 October 35	Fagiano Okayama	2–1	Iwaki FC	Okayama
14:03 JST	Iwabuchi 14', 21'	Report	Omori 56'	Stadium: City Light Stadium; Attendance: 9,960; Referee: Reo Tanaka

26 October 36	Iwaki FC	1–2	Mito HollyHock	Iwaki
13:54 JST	Tanimura 75'	Report	Kusano 50'; Nakashima 79'	Stadium: Hawaiians Stadium Iwaki; Attendance: 4,951; Referee: Yoshimi Yamashita

3 November 37	Shimizu S-Pulse	1–0	Iwaki FC	Shizuoka
14:03 JST	Hasukawa 81'	Report		Stadium: IAI Stadium Nihondaira; Attendance: 18,046; Referee: Yusuke Ohashi

10 November 38	Iwaki FC	3–0	Thespa Gunma	Iwaki
14:03 JST	Yamaguchi 13', 78'; Arima 89'	Report		Stadium: Hawaiians Stadium Iwaki; Attendance: 5,034; Referee: Yuzo Sutani

=== J.League Cup ===
The 2024 J.League Cup was expanded so that all 60 J.League clubs would participate. This was Iwaki's first season competing in the competition.

13 March Round 1 – Match 1	FC Osaka	0–2	Iwaki FC	Higashiōsaka
19:00		Report	Yamaguchi 71'; Kondo 87'	Stadium: Hanazono Rugby Stadium; Attendance: 1,980; Referee: Masuya Ueda

17 April Round 1 – Match 2	Iwaki FC	0–2	Albirex Niigata	Iwaki
19:03 JST		Report	Hasegawa 6'; Taniguchi 90+1'	Stadium: Hawaiians Stadium Iwaki; Attendance: 3,618; Referee: Hiroki Kasahara

=== Emperor's Cup ===
12 June Second round	Blaublitz Akita	0–2	Iwaki FC	Akita
19:03		Report	Arima 35'; Yamaguchi 73'	Stadium: Soyu Stadium; Attendance: 872; Referee: Yoshiro Imamura

10 July Third round	Sanfrecce Hiroshima	4–0	Iwaki FC	Iwaki
19:03	Sasaki 62', 68'; Ohashi 66'; Marcos Júnior 90+1'	Report		Stadium: Hawaiians Stadium Iwaki; Attendance: 3,074; Referee: Koei Koya

== Statistics ==
=== Goalscorers ===
The list is sorted by shirt number when total goals are equal.

Rnk	Pos	No.	Player	J2	EC	JLC	Total
1	FW	17	(Japan) Kaina Tanimura	18	0	0	18
2	FW	10	(Japan) Kotaro Arima	10	1	0	11
3	MF	14	(Japan) Daiki Yamaguchi	7	1	1	9
4	DF	3	(Japan) Hayato Teruyama	4	0	0	4
4	FW	9	(Japan) Yoshihito Kondo	3	0	1	4
6	MF	7	(Japan) Jun Nishikawa	3	0	0	3
7	DF	34	(Japan) Rio Omori	2	0	0	2
7	–	–	Own goal	2	0	0	2
9	MF	23	(Japan) Rui Osako	1	0	0	1
9	MF	24	(Japan) Yuto Yamashita	1	0	0	1
9	DF	27	(Japan) Kazuki Dohana	1	0	0	1
9	FW	38	(Japan) Naoki Kumata	1	0	0	1
TOTALS				53	2	2	57

Last updated: 10 November 2024.
Source: jleague.co

=== Clean sheets ===
The list is sorted by shirt number when total clean sheets are equal.

Rnk	No.	Player	J1	EC	JLC	Total
1	21	(Japan) Kotaro Tachikawa	13	0	0	13
2	1	(Japan) Kengo Tanaka	1	0	1	2
TOTALS			14	0	1	15

Last updated: 10 November 2024.
Source: fbref.com
