= 2023 Montedio Yamagata season =

Montedio Yamagata
2023 season
- Chairman: Kentaro Aita
- Manager: Susumu Watanabe
- Stadium: ND Soft Stadium Yamagata
- J2 League: 18th
- Emperor's Cup: Second round
- Biggest win: Montedio Yamagata 5–0 Oita Trinita
- All statistics correct as of 17 May 2023.

The 2023 season was Montedio Yamagata's 39th season in existence and the club's eighth consecutive season in the second division of Japanese football. In addition to the domestic league, Montedio Yamagata participated in this season's edition of the Emperor's Cup.

== Players ==
=== First-team squad ===
As of 6 April 2023.

Note: Flags indicate national team as defined under FIFA eligibility rules; some limited exceptions apply. Players may hold more than one non-FIFA nationality.

No.	Pos.	Nation	Player
1	GK	JPN	Masaaki Goto
2	DF	JPN	Shumpei Naruse (on loan from Nagoya Grampus)
3	DF	JPN	Yuta Kumamoto
4	DF	JPN	Keisuke Nishimura (on loan from Omiya Ardija)
5	DF	JPN	Hiroki Noda
6	DF	JPN	Takumi Yamada
7	MF	JPN	Kenya Okazaki
8	MF	JPN	Yudai Konishi
9	FW	BRA	Dellatorre
10	FW	POR	Tiago Alves
11	FW	JPN	Yoshiki Fujimoto
13	MF	JPN	Shuto Kawai
14	MF	JPN	Takayuki Arakaki
15	MF	JPN	Ibuki Fujita
16	GK	JPN	Ko Hasegawa
17	MF	JPN	Taiki Kato

No.	Pos.	Nation	Player
18	MF	JPN	Shuto Minami
21	MF	JPN	Wataru Tanaka
22	DF	JPN	Taiju Yoshida
23	GK	JPN	Eisuke Fujishima
24	FW	JPN	Rui Yokoyama
25	MF	JPN	Shintaro Kokubu
26	MF	JPN	Ayumu Kawai
27	DF	JPN	Keita Yoshioka
32	GK	JPN	Ryusuke Otomo
36	FW	JPN	Junya Takahashi
41	MF	JPN	Masahito Ono
42	DF	JPN	Zain Issaka
47	MF	JPN	Towa Arakawa
49	FW	JPN	Yusuke Goto
50	MF	JPN	Kaisei Kano ^{DSP}
51	DF	JPN	Jo Soma ^{DSP}

=== Out on loan ===
Note: Flags indicate national team as defined under FIFA eligibility rules; some limited exceptions apply. Players may hold more than one non-FIFA nationality.

No.	Pos.	Nation	Player
—	DF	JPN	Kiriya Sakamoto (at Sagan Tosu)
—	FW	JPN	Kanta Matsumoto (at Tegevajaro Miyazaki)

No.	Pos.	Nation	Player
—	FW	JPN	Kanato Abe (at ReinMeer Aomori)

== Transfers ==
=== In ===
Pos.	Player	Transferred from	Fee	Date	Source
GK	(Japan)	(Japan)			
GK	(Japan)	(Japan)			

=== Out ===
Pos.	Player	Transferred to	Fee	Date	Source
GK	(Japan)	(Japan)			
GK	(Japan)	(Japan)			

== Pre-season and friendlies ==
Win Draw Loss Fixtures

2023 Friendly	Montedio Yamagata (Japan)	v	(Japan)	TBD
17:00

== Competitions ==
=== Overview ===
Competition	First match	Last match	Starting round	Record							
Competition	First match	Last match	Starting round	Pld	W	D	L	GF	GA	GD	Win %
J2 League	18 February 2023	12 November 2023	Matchday 1	20	9	1	10	32	27	+5	45.00
Emperor's Cup	7 June 2023		Second round	1	1	0	0	1	0	+1	100.00
Total				21	10	1	10	33	27	+6	47.62

Last updated: 11 June 2023
Source: Soccerway

=== J2 League ===
==== League table ====
Pos	Team	Pld	W	D	L	GF	GA	GD	Pts	Promotion or relegation
3	Tokyo Verdy (O, P)	42	21	12	9	57	31	+26	75	Qualification for the promotion play-offs
4	Shimizu S-Pulse	42	20	14	8	78	34	+44	74	Qualification for the promotion play-offs
5	Montedio Yamagata	42	21	4	17	64	54	+10	67	Qualification for the promotion play-offs
6	JEF United Chiba	42	19	10	13	61	53	+8	67	Qualification for the promotion play-offs
7	V-Varen Nagasaki	42	18	11	13	70	56	+14	65	

Source: Meiji Yasuda J2 League, J.League Data Site
Rules for classification: 1) Points; 2) Goal difference; 3) Goals scored; 4) Head-to-head points; 5) Head-to-head goal difference; 6) Head-to-head goal scored; 7) Fair-play points.
(O) Play-off winners; (P) Promoted

==== Results summary ====
Overall								Home						Away					
Pld	W	D	L	GF	GA	GD	Pts	W	D	L	GF	GA	GD	W	D	L	GF	GA	GD
20	9	1	10	32	27	+5	28	5	1	3	16	10	+6	4	0	7	16	17	−1

Last updated: 17 May 2023.
Source: Worldfootball

==== Results by round ====
Round	1	2	3	4	5	6	7	8	9	10	11	12	13	14	15	16	17
Ground	A	A	A	A	H	A	H	A	A	H	A	H	A	H	A	H	H
Result	W	W	L	L	L	L	L	L	L	L	W	D	L	W	L	W	
Position	3	1	5	8	11	17	18	20	20	21	21	21	21	19	20	18	

Updated to match(es) played on 17 May 2023. Source: Worldfootball
A = Away; H = Home; W = Win; D = Draw; L = Loss

==== Matches ====
The league fixtures were announced on 20 January 2023.

18 February 2023 1	Ventforet Kofu	1–2	Montedio Yamagata	Kōfu
13:09	Iijima (yellow card) 59'; Taketomi 70'; Yamamoto (yellow card) 76'	Report	Dellatorre 9'; Tiago Alves 77' (pen.)	Stadium: JIT Recycle Ink Stadium; Attendance: 9,573; Referee: Hirokazu Otsubo

25 February 2023 2	JEF United Chiba	1–3	Montedio Yamagata	Chiba
14:00	Komori 19'	Report	Issaka 45'; Dellatorre 62'; Tiago Alves 83'	Stadium: Fukuda Denshi Arena; Attendance: 9,203; Referee: Keisuke Nobori

4 March 2023 3	Júbilo Iwata	2–1	Montedio Yamagata	Iwata
14:03	Germain 38' (pen.); Dudu (yellow card) 66'; Matsumoto 77'	Report	Goto (yellow card) 36'; Konishi (yellow card) 62'; Noda 74'	Stadium: Yamaha Stadium; Attendance: 8,193; Referee: Kazuyoshi Enomoto

12 March 2023 4	Thespakusatsu Gunma	1–0	Montedio Yamagata	Maebashi
17:03	Take 5'; Amagasa (yellow card) 72'; Hosogai (yellow card) 89'	Report	Noda (yellow card) 67'; Kawai (yellow card) 71'	Stadium: Shoda Shoyu Stadium Gunma; Attendance: 3,197; Referee: Yosuke Kubota

19 March 2023 5	Montedio Yamagata	0–3	Machida Zelvia	Tendō
14:00		Report	Erik 24', 52'; Araki 82'	Stadium: ND Soft Stadium Yamagata; Attendance: 11,855; Referee: Toru Kakinuma

25 March 2023 6	V-Varen Nagasaki	3–2	Montedio Yamagata	Isahaya
14:00		Report		Stadium: Transcosmos Stadium Nagasaki

2 April 2023 7	Montedio Yamagata	0–1	Mito HollyHock	Tendō
13:00	Kokubu (yellow card) 34'; Yamada (yellow card) 47'	Report	Matsuda 36'; Takeda (yellow card) 86'	Stadium: ND Soft Stadium Yamagata; Attendance: 6,916; Referee: Keigo Sendachi

8 April 2023 8	Omiya Ardija	2–1	Montedio Yamagata	Saitama
14:03		Report		Stadium: NACK5 Stadium Omiya; Attendance: 5,723; Referee: Koji Takasaki

29 April 2023 12	Montedio Yamagata	1–1	Renofa Yamaguchi	Tendō
14:03	Issaka 13'	Report	Kawano 3'	Stadium: ND Soft Stadium Yamagata; Attendance: 6,721; Referee: Tomokazu Sato

3 May 2023 13	Fagiano Okayama	2–0	Montedio Yamagata	Okayama
14:03	Semba 49'; Sakuragawa 51'	Report		Stadium: City Light Stadium; Attendance: 10,909; Referee: Hiroyuki Kimura

7 May 2023 14	Montedio Yamagata	3–2	Fujieda MYFC	Tendō
14:03	Yokoyama 69'; Minami 80'; Tiago Alves 83'	Report	Iwabuchi 2'; Watanabe 43' (pen.)	Stadium: ND Soft Stadium Yamagata; Attendance: 5,390; Referee: Hiroyoshi Takayama

13 May 2023 15	Vegalta Sendai	2–1	Montedio Yamagata	Sendai
14:00	Kida 32'; Nakajima 90+2'	Report	Nishimura (yellow card) 58'; Fujimoto 85'; Kokubu (yellow card) 87'	Stadium: Yurtec Stadium Sendai; Attendance: 15,163; Referee: Kazuyoshi Enomoto

17 May 2023 16	Montedio Yamagata	5–0	Oita Trinita	Yamagata
13:33	Fujita 19', 85'; Tiago Alves 45+1'; Yokoyama 65'; Kato 82'	Report		Stadium: ND Soft Stadium Yamagata; Attendance: 6,432; Referee: Futoshi Nakamura

21 May 2023 17	Montedio Yamagata	v	Blaublitz Akita	Tendō
14:00		Report		Stadium: ND Soft Stadium Yamagata

=== Emperor's Cup ===
7 June 2023 Second round	Montedio Yamagata	1–0	Sony Sendai	Tendō
19:00 JST (UTC+9)	Tanaka 27'	Report		Stadium: ND Soft Stadium Yamagata; Referee: Tomokazu Sato
