= Toya Izumi =

Japanese footballer (born 2000)

Toya Izumi 泉柊椰
Personal information
- Date of birth: 2 December 2000 (age 25)
- Place of birth: Yao City, Osaka Prefecture, Japan
- Height: 1.74 m (5 ft 9 in)
- Position: Midfielder

Team information
- Current team: RB Omiya Ardija
- Number: 14

Youth career
- 2005–2012: Yao Taiyo Lynxes SC
- 2013–2015: Kashiwada SC
- 2016–2018: Vissel Kobe

College career
Years	Team	Apps	(Gls)
2019–2022	Biwako Seikei Sport College		

Senior career*
Years	Team	Apps	(Gls)
2023–2025	Vissel Kobe	8	(1)
2023	→ Montedio Yamagata (loan)	7	(0)
2024	→ Omiya Ardija (loan)	38	(6)
2025–	RB Omiya Ardija	55	(14)
- * Club domestic league appearances and goals as of 21:13, 10 June 2026 (UTC)

Toya Izumi (泉柊椰, Izumi Toya; born 2 December 2000) is a Japanese professional footballer who plays as a midfielder for J2 League club RB Omiya Ardija.

== Club career ==
In October 2021, it was announced Izumi would be joining up with Vissel Kobe's first team squad as a designated special player, meaning he could continue to represent his university as well as being registered with the first team. He was a designated special player throughout the 2022 season, although he did not make a first-team appearance. Following the conclusion of the 2022 season, Izumi joined the top team for the 2023 season and took the number 27 shirt.

On 25 February 2023, he made his debut in a J1 League match against Hokkaido Consadole Sapporo where he appeared as an 70th-minute substitute for Daiju Sasaki. In his first start for Kobe on 18 March, he scored his first goal for the club in a J1 League match against Sagan Tosu, which Kobe eventually went on to win 1–0.

After making 14 appearances in all competitions for Vissel Kobe in the first half of the 2023 season, it was announced in August that Izumi would be joining J2 League club Montedio Yamagata on loan for the remainder of the season. He made eight appearances for the club.

In December 2023, it was announced that Izumi would be joining newly relegated J3 League club Omiya Ardija for the 2024 season. He scored two goals on his debut for the club in a 4–1 league victory over Vanraure Hachinohe. He finished the season with six goals in thirty-six appearances and was inducted into the J3 League Best XI.

== Career statistics ==
As of match played 6 June 2026

Appearances and goals by club, season and competition
Club	Season	League			Emperor's Cup		J. League Cup		Other		Total	
Club	Season	Division	Apps	Goals	Apps	Goals	Apps	Goals	Apps	Goals	Apps	Goals
Vissel Kobe	2023	J1 League	8	1	0	0	6	0	—		14	1
Montedio Yamagata (loan)	2023	J2 League	7	0	0	0	0	0	1 (Note: Appearance in J2 League promotion play-offs)	0	8	0
Omiya Ardija (loan)	2024	J3 League	38	6	1	0	0	0	0	0	39	6
RB Omiya Ardija	2025	J2 League	35	4	1	0	0	0	1	1	37	5
RB Omiya Ardija	2026	J2/J3	20	10	—		—		—		20	10
RB Omiya Ardija	Total		93	20	2	0	0	0	1	1	96	21
Career total			108	21	2	0	6	0	2	1	118	22

== Honours ==
Vissel Kobe

- J1 League: 2023

RB Omiya Ardija

- J3 League: 2024

Individual

- J3 League Best XI: 2024
