= Masaaki Goto =

Japanese footballer

Masaaki Goto 後藤 雅明
Personal information
- Full name: Masaaki Goto
- Date of birth: 24 May 1994 (age 32)
- Place of birth: Tokorozawa, Saitama, Japan
- Height: 1.90 m (6 ft 3 in)
- Position: Goalkeeper

Team information
- Current team: V-Varen Nagasaki
- Number: 1

Youth career
- 2010–2012: Kokugakuin Univ. Kugayama High School

College career
Years	Team	Apps	(Gls)
2013–2016	Waseda University		

Senior career*
Years	Team	Apps	(Gls)
2017–2020	Shonan Bellmare	3	(0)
2019	→ Zweigen Kanazawa (loan)	3	(0)
2021	Zweigen Kanazawa	37	(0)
2022–2024	Montedio Yamagata	118	(0)
2025–	V-Varen Nagasaki	50	(0)
Medal record
Shonan Bellmare
Winner	J.League Cup	2018
- * Club domestic league appearances and goals as of 11 August 2026

Masaaki Goto (後藤 雅明, Goto Masaaki; born May 24, 1994) is a Japanese football player who play as a goalkeeper and currently play for J1 League club, V-Varen Nagasaki.

== Career ==
Masaaki Goto joined J2 League club, Shonan Bellmare in 2017. On July 12, he debuted in Emperor's Cup (v Júbilo Iwata).

On 26 December 2024, Masaaki Goto was announce official transfer to J2 club, V-Varen Nagasaki from 2025 season.

== Career statistics ==
=== Club ===
As of the start from 2025 season.

Club performance		League			Cup		League Cup		Total	
Season	Club	Division	Apps	Goals	Apps	Goals	Apps	Goals	Apps	Goals
Japan		League			Emperor's Cup		J.League Cup		Total	
2017	Shonan Bellmare	J2 League	0	0	2	0	–		2	0
2018	Shonan Bellmare	J1 League	0	0	0	0	3	0	3	0
2019	Zweigen Kanazawa (loan)	J2 League	3	0	2	0	–		5	0
2020	Shonan Bellmare	J1 League	3	0	–		1	0	4	0
2021	Zweigen Kanazawa	J2 League	37	0	0	0	–		37	0
2022	Montedio Yamagata	J2 League	42	0	0	0	–		42	0
2023	Montedio Yamagata	J2 League	38	0	0	0	–		38	0
2024	Montedio Yamagata	J2 League	38	0	0	0	–		38	0
2025	V-Varen Nagasaki	J2 League	0	0	0	0	0	0	0	0
Career total			161	0	4	0	4	0	169	0

== Honours ==
Shonan Bellmare

- J.League Cup: 2018
