= Japanet Takata =

Japanet Takata Co., Ltd. (Japanese: 株式会社ジャパネットたかた, Hepburn: Kabushiki-gaisha Japanetto Takata) is a Japanese mail-order and home shopping retail company based in Sasebo, Nagasaki Prefecture.

Founded in 1986, it is a wholly-owned subsidiary of Japanet Holdings, which also owns J-League team V-Varen Nagasaki.

== History ==
Takata Corporation emerged from a business decision on January 16, 1986, when its founder, Akira Takata, separated his business from his father's Takata Camera (有限会社たかたカメラ). Initially, it owned a physical store selling cameras and related equipment (authorized Fujifilm dealer and Sony shop), but, in 1990, it started airing home-order programming on Nagasaki Broadcasting's radio station. That year, they sold fifty cameras in five minutes in one of their programs, achieving sales of one million yen.

In 1994, it started airing programs for television and increased its reach to include flyers and the internet. Most of its revenues come from sales of its products on its television programs.

Since 2009, it began sponsoring soccer team V-Varen Nagasaki, then it acquired the team in 2017 to save it from financial problems.

Japanet owns Japanet Channel DX, and, through its subsidiary Japanet Broadcasting, owns the satellite channels BS10 (TV channel) and BS10 Premium. The company applied for a broadcasting license in 2019 and acquired Star Channel from Tohokushinsha in 2024.
