= Ibuki Fujita =

Japanese footballer (born 1991)

Ibuki Fujita 藤田 息吹
Personal information
- Full name: Ibuki Fujita
- Date of birth: 30 January 1991 (age 35)
- Place of birth: Aichi Prefecture, Nagoya, Japan
- Height: 1.70 m (5 ft 7 in)
- Position: Midfielder

Team information
- Current team: Fagiano Okayama
- Number: 24

Youth career
- 2006–2008: Fujieda Higashi High School

College career
Years	Team	Apps	(Gls)
2009–2012	Keio University		

Senior career*
Years	Team	Apps	(Gls)
2013–2015	Shimizu S-Pulse	2	(0)
2015	→ Ehime FC (loan)	30	(0)
2016–2017	Ehime FC	79	(1)
2018–2020	Matsumoto Yamaga	90	(1)
2021–2023	Montedio Yamagata	102	(9)
2024–	Fagiano Okayama	64	(0)
- * Club domestic league appearances and goals as of 12 August 2026

Ibuki Fujita (藤田 息吹, Fujita Ibuki; born 30 January 1991 in Nagoya) is a Japanese footballer who plays for Fagiano Okayama.

== Career ==
=== Shimizu S-Pulse ===
On 25 September 2012, Fujita was announced as a new player for the 2013 season. He made his league debut against Albirex Niigata on 22 October 2014.

=== Loan to Ehime ===
On 7 January 2015, Fujita was announced on loan at Ehime FC. He made his league debut against Tokushima Vortis on 8 March 2015.

=== Ehime FC ===
During his permanent spell, Fujita made his league debut against Shimizu S-Pulse on 28 February 2016. Fujita scored his first league goal against Roasso Kumamoto on 31 August 2016, scoring in the 89th minute.

=== Matsumoto Yamaga ===
On 18 December 2017, Fujita was announced at Matsumoto Yamaga. He made his league debut against Yokohama FC on 25 February 2018. Fujita scored his first league goal against Zweigen Kanazawa on 14 October 2018, scoring in the 37th minute.

=== Montedio Yamagata ===
On 8 January 2021, Fujita was announced at Montedio Yamagata.

=== Fagiano Okayama ===
On 18 December 2023, Fujita was announced at Fagiano Okayama. On 28 December 2024, his contract with the club was extended for the 2025 season.

== International career ==
Fujita has been selected for the Japan U19s, and in December 2010, participated in a training camp for the Japan national team.

== Career statistics ==
Updated to 26 July 2022.

Appearances and goals by club, season and competition
Club	Season	League			Emperor's Cup		J.League Cup		Total	
Club	Season	Division	Apps	Goals	Apps	Goals	Apps	Goals	Apps	Goals
Shimizu S-Pulse	2013	J1 League	0	0	0	0	1	0	1	0
Shimizu S-Pulse	2014	J1 League	2	0	0	0	0	0	2	0
Ehime FC	2015	J2 League	29	1	1	0	—		30	1
Ehime FC	2016	J2 League	37	1	1	0	—		38	1
Ehime FC	2017	J2 League	42	0	0	0	—		42	0
Matsumoto Yamaga	2018	J2 League	38	1	1	0	—		39	1
Matsumoto Yamaga	2019	J1 League	27	0	1	0	3	0	31	0
Matsumoto Yamaga	2020	J2 League	25	0	–		1	0	26	0
Montedio Yamagata	2021	J2 League	33	5	0	0	–		33	5
Montedio Yamagata	2022	J2 League	22	2	0	0	–		22	2
Career total			255	10	4	0	5	0	264	10
