= Taisei Abe =

Japanese footballer

Taisei Abe 安部 大晴
Personal information
- Full name: Taisei Abe
- Date of birth: 7 June 2004 (age 22)
- Place of birth: Nagasaki, Japan
- Height: 1.72 m (5 ft 8 in)
- Position: Midfielder

Team information
- Current team: Holstein Kiel (on loan from V-Varen Nagasaki)
- Number: 24

Youth career
- –2021: V-Varen Nagasaki

Senior career*
Years	Team	Apps	(Gls)
2021–	V-Varen Nagasaki	47	(2)
2025–2026	→ Luzern (loan)	34	(0)
2026–	→ Holstein Kiel (loan)	0	(0)

International career^{‡}
2023	Japan U20	7	(0)
- * Club domestic league appearances and goals as of 26 May 2026 ‡ National team caps and goals as of 04:15, 21 October 2023

Taisei Abe (安部 大晴, Abe Taisei; born 7 June 2004) is a Japanese professional footballer who plays as a midfielder for 2. Bundesliga club Holstein Kiel, on loan from J1 League club V-Varen Nagasaki.

== Club career ==
Abe joined V-Varen Nagasaki in 2021. He made his debut for Nagasaki in a 3–0 Win over Renofa Yamaguchi, coming on in the 86th minute for Caio César. He scored his first goal for the club against FC Tokyo on 22 June 2022 in the Emperor's Cup, as V-Varen won after extra time.

On 25 July 2025, Abe moved on loan to Luzern in Switzerland, with an option to buy.

On 27 June 2026, Abe was loaned by Holstein Kiel in German 2. Bundesliga, with an option to buy.

== International career ==
Abe was called up to the Japan U20s for the 2023 AFC U-20 Asian Cup. He made his debut on 3 March 2023, coming on for Sota Kitano in a 2–1 win against China U20s. Japan were able to get to the Semi Finals before being knocked out on penalties by Iraq Under 20s.

Abe was called up to the Japan U-20 squad for the 2023 FIFA U-20 World Cup. He made his debut in the tournament against Senegal Under 20s on 21 May 2023, coming on in a 1–0 win in the 90th+1st minute for Taichi Fukui. Japan were knocked out in the group stage.

== Career statistics ==
=== Club ===
As of 23 February 2026

Appearances and goals by club, season and competition
Club	Season	League			National cup		League cup		Other		Total	
Club	Season	Division	Apps	Goals	Apps	Goals	Apps	Goals	Apps	Goals	Apps	Goals
V-Varen Nagasaki	2020	J2 League	4	0	2	0	0	0	0	0	6	0
V-Varen Nagasaki	2021	J2 League	1	0	1 (Note: Appearances in the Emperor's Cup)	0	0	0	0	0	2	0
V-Varen Nagasaki	2022	J2 League	17	0	1	1	0	0	0	0	18	1
V-Varen Nagasaki	2023	J2 League	12	1	3	0	0	0	1	0	16	1
V-Varen Nagasaki	2024	J2 League	13	1	0	0	0	0	0	0	13	1
FC Luzern (loan)	2025–26	Swiss Super League	23	0	4	0	0	0	0	0	23	0
Career total			70	2	11	1	0	0	1	0	83	3
