= Rui Ōsako =

Japanese footballer (born 2004)

Rui Ōsako 大迫 塁
Personal information
- Date of birth: 13 October 2004 (age 22)
- Place of birth: Kagoshima, Kagoshima, Japan
- Height: 1.77 m (5 ft 10 in)
- Position: Midfielder

Team information
- Current team: Tochigi SC
- Number: 8

Youth career
- Taniyama SSS
- FC Sousarle
- 2017–2019: Kamimura Gakuen Junior High School
- 2020–2022: Kamimura Gakuen High School

Senior career*
Years	Team	Apps	(Gls)
2023–2026	Cerezo Osaka	1	(0)
2024	→ Iwaki FC (loan)	14	(1)
2025	→ SC Sagamihara (loan)	15	(1)
2026–	Tochigi SC	0	(0)

International career
2019	Japan U15	11	(2)
- * Club domestic league appearances and goals as of 17 August 2026

Rui Ōsako (大迫 塁, Ōsako Rui; born 13 October 2004) is a Japanese footballer currently playing as a midfielder for Tochigi SC.

== Early life ==
Ōsako was born in Kagoshima City in the Kagoshima Prefecture of Japan, where his parents ran a ramen restaurant in Taniyama. It was at this ramen restaurant that Ōsako began to play football, as he would often play with people from his neighbourhood who came to visit the restaurant.

== Club career ==
=== High school football ===
Having played football for children's teams Taniyama SSS and FC Sousarle, Ōsako enrolled at the Kamimura Gakuen Junior High School before moving on to the renowned football school, Kamimura Gakuen High School. Settling immediately, he played a key role in his freshman year, with manager Maki Takemoto stating that if Ōsako hadn't joined the team, teammate Shiō Fukuda would not have achieved the success he had - with Fukuda going on to join German side Borussia Mönchengladbach.

In his second year at Kamimura Gakuen, he represented the high school at the 2021 All Japan High School Soccer Tournament, however they were surprisingly knocked out in the first round by the Teikyo Nagaoka High School of Niigata Prefecture. This defeat motivated him, and he would later state "I never want to feel like this. I'll become more desperate, I'll be more greedy to win, and I'll definitely win in the end. I don't want to feel like this."

The following year was a better one for Ōsako; having trained with the under-18 side of J1 League club Cerezo Osaka in early 2022, Kamimura Gakuen would go on to beat Cerezo Osaka in the playoffs of the Japan Club Youth Championship, earning promotion to the under-18 Premier League. He was named captain of the high school team, and helped them to the semi-finals of the 2022 All Japan High School Soccer Tournament, where they were beaten by eventual champions Okayama Gakugeikan High School 4–1 on penalties after a 3–3 draw.

=== Cerezo Osaka ===
Ōsako received an unofficial contract offer from Cerezo Osaka in February 2022, while only in his second year of high school. Having officially joined the team in early 2023, he featured in a friendly against Hokushinetsu Football League side Fukui United on 26 February, where he played as a left-back, as opposed to his usual central midfield role. Despite playing out of position, he earned praise from manager Akio Kogiku after the 4–0 win.

His professional debut came two months later, playing in Cerezo Osaka's 4–0 J.League Cup loss to Kyoto Sanga, coming on as a late second-half substitute for Kakeru Funaki. In June of the same year, he featured in the 5–0 Emperor's Cup win against Cento Cuore Harima, before suffering a knee injury which kept him out for a month. In August 2023, he returned from injury, playing in a 10–3 friendly win against JFL side Maruyasu Okazaki.

== International career ==
Ōsako was first called up to the Japan under-15 side in March 2019 as part of the "04 group" - players born in 2004 - in preparation for the 2021 FIFA U-17 World Cup. He featured at the Torneo Delle Nazioni, hosted in Italy in April 2019, playing in four games and scoring in Japan's 5–3 win against Turkey as Japan went on to lose to Mexico in the final.

In June 2019 he was called up to the squad again ahead of 2020 AFC U-16 Championship qualification in September of the same year. He established himself as a key member of the team, and was named captain for the qualification tournament. He scored once against Malaysia as Japan finished top of their group, however due to the COVID-19 pandemic, the 2020 AFC U-16 Championship, as well as the 2021 FIFA U-17 World Cup, was cancelled. He was called up again in November 2019 for a tour of Spain the following month.

== Career statistics ==
=== Club ===
As of 23 March 2026.

Appearances and goals by club, season and competition
Club	Season	League			National cup (Note: Includes Emperors Cup)		League cup (Note: Includes J.League Cup)		Total	
Club	Season	Division	Apps	Goals	Apps	Goals	Apps	Goals	Apps	Goals
Cerezo Osaka	2023	J1 League	0	0	1	0	1	0	2	0
Iwaki FC (loan)	2024	J2 League	14	1	2	0	2	0	18	1
SC Sagamihara (loan)	2025	J3 League	15	1	4	0	1	0	20	1
Career total			29	2	7	0	4	0	40	2
