= Rui Yokoyama =

Japanese footballer

Rui Yokoyama 横山 塁
Personal information
- Date of birth: 30 September 1999 (age 27)
- Place of birth: Tokyo, Japan
- Height: 1.80 m (5 ft 11 in)
- Position: Midfielder

Team information
- Current team: Montedio Yamagata
- Number: 18

Youth career
- Buddy SC Koto
- –2017: FC Tokyo

College career
Years	Team	Apps	(Gls)
2018–2021	Toyo University		

Senior career*
Years	Team	Apps	(Gls)
2021–	Montedio Yamagata	57	(7)
2025	→ Renofa Yamaguchi (loan)	16	(3)

International career
2018	Japan U19		
- * Club domestic league appearances and goals as of 13 August 2026

Rui Yokoyama (横山 塁, Yokoyama Rui; born 30 September 1999) is a Japanese footballer who play as a midfielder and currently play for Montedio Yamagata.

== Career ==
On 19 December 2024, Yokoyama announcement officially transfer to Renofa Yamaguchi on loan from 2025 season.

== Career statistics ==
=== Club ===
As of the start from 2025 season.

Club	Season	League			National Cup		League Cup		Other		Total	
Club	Season	Division	Apps	Goals	Apps	Goals	Apps	Goals	Apps	Goals	Apps	Goals
Montedio Yamagata	2021	J2 League	0	0	0	0	0	0	0	0	0	0
Montedio Yamagata	2022	J2 League	9	1	1	1	0	0	0	0	10	2
Montedio Yamagata	2023	J2 League	27	5	2	0	0	0	0	0	29	5
Montedio Yamagata	2024	J2 League	11	1	1	0	1	0	0	0	13	1
Renofa Yamaguchi (loan)	2025	J2 League	0	0	0	0	0	0	0	0	0	0
Career total			47	7	4	1	1	0	0	0	52	8
