= Kota Kawano =

Japanese professional footballer

Kota Kawano 河野孝汰
Personal information
- Full name: Kota Kawano
- Date of birth: 12 August 2003 (age 23)
- Place of birth: Shūnan, Japan
- Height: 1.76 m (5 ft 9 in)
- Position: Forward

Team information
- Current team: Fagiano Okayama
- Number: 20

Youth career
- Onomichi Higashi FC
- Boa Sorte Mito
- –2020: Renofa Yamaguchi

Senior career*
| Years | Team | Apps | (Gls) |
| 2019–2025 | Renofa Yamaguchi | 118 | (18) |
| 2026– | Fagiano Okayama | 19 | (5) |
- * Club domestic league appearances and goals as of 21:29, 1 October 2026 (UTC) ‡ National team caps and goals as of 22 June 2020

Kota Kawano (河野孝汰, Kawano Kota; (born 12 August 2003)) is a Japanese professional footballer who plays as a forward for J1 League club Fagiano Okayama.

== Early life ==
Kota was born in Shūnan.

== Career ==
Kawano made his debut for Renofa against Montedio Yamagata on the 16th of November 2019. He scored his first goal for the club against V-Varen Nagasaki on the 29th of July 2020, scoring in the 79th minute.

In February 2024, he was named captain of Renofa Yamaguchi ahead of the 2024 season.

In December 2025, Kawano transferred to J1 League club Fagiano Okayama.

== Career statistics ==
As of 1 October 2026

Appearances and goals by club, season and competition
| Club | Season | League | | | National cup (Note: Includes Emperors Cup) | | League cup (Note: Includes J.League Cup) | | Total | |
| Club | Season | Division | Apps | Goals | Apps | Goals | Apps | Goals | Apps | Goals |
|---|---|---|---|---|---|---|---|---|---|---|
| Renofa Yamaguchi | 2019 | J2 League | 1 | 0 | 0 | 0 | – | | 1 | 0 |
| Renofa Yamaguchi | 2020 | J2 League | 19 | 1 | 0 | 0 | – | | 19 | 1 |
| Renofa Yamaguchi | 2021 | J2 League | 16 | 2 | 0 | 0 | – | | 16 | 2 |
| Renofa Yamaguchi | 2022 | J2 League | 3 | 0 | 0 | 0 | – | | 3 | 0 |
| Renofa Yamaguchi | 2023 | J2 League | 34 | 5 | 1 | 0 | – | | 35 | 5 |
| Renofa Yamaguchi | 2024 | J2 League | 32 | 8 | 2 | 1 | – | | 34 | 9 |
| Renofa Yamaguchi | 2025 | J2 League | 13 | 2 | 0 | 0 | – | | 13 | 2 |
| Renofa Yamaguchi | Total | | 118 | 18 | 3 | 1 | 0 | 0 | 121 | 19 |
| Fagiano Okayama | 2026 | J1 (100) | 14 | 2 | – | | – | | 14 | 2 |
| Fagiano Okayama | 2026–27 | J1 League | 5 | 3 | 1 | 2 | 1 | 1 | 7 | 6 |
| Fagiano Okayama | Total | | 19 | 5 | 1 | 2 | 1 | 1 | 21 | 8 |
| Career total | | | 137 | 23 | 4 | 3 | 1 | 1 | 142 | 27 |
