= Ryo Shigaki =

Japanese football manager

Ryo Shigaki 志垣 良
Personal information
- Date of birth: 9 May 1980 (age 46)
- Place of birth: Nakagawa, Fukuoka, Japan

Youth career
- 1996–1998: Higashi Fukuoka High School

Senior career*
Years	Team	Apps	(Gls)
1999–2000	Solihull Borough		
2000–2001	Racing Club Warwick		

Managerial career
- 2022: Vanraure Hachinohe
- 2023: FC Osaka
- 2024–2025: Renofa Yamaguchi
- 2026: Júbilo Iwata
- * Club domestic league appearances and goals

Ryo Shigaki (志垣 良, Shigaki Ryo; born 9 May 1980) is a Japanese professional football manager.

== Playing career ==
After graduating from Higashi Fukuoka High School in 1998, Shigaki moved to England. From 1999 to 2000, he played for Solihull Borough, then moved to Racing Club Warwick between 2000 and 2001.

== Coaching career ==
Shigaki had a range of different coaching jobs in England, while studying Football Science at Liverpool John Moores University. Between 2001 and 2005, he worked as a coach for Southport FC and Tranmere Rovers, as well as being a soccer school coach at Manchester United.

In 2006, Shigaki moved back to Japan, initially working as an interpreter at Nagoya Grampus, and in 2007 he also became a coach at the club. Between 2008 and 2016, Shigaki worked as a coach for a number of clubs, including Avispa Fukuoka, Oita Trinita, JEF United Chiba, Gainare Tottori and Júbilo Iwata. During this time, he gained his A-Class coach general license in 2012.

After leaving Júbilo Iwata, Shigaki was named Singapore Sports School U-14 Coach in 2017, followed by becoming the national coach of Singapore national U-17 football team. He was managing the team for the 2017 Japan-ASEAN U-16 Youth Football Tournament, the 2018 Jockey Cup and the 2018 AFF U-16 Youth Championship. In 2018, he became a JFA certified S-class coach.

In January 2019, Shigaki returned to Gainare Tottori after six years away as head coach. Unable to help Tottori gain promotion to the J2 League, Shigaki left his role at the end of the 2020 season.

For the 2021 season, he was appointed as the U-18 coach of Kyoto Sanga.

In September 2025, despite receiving several job offers following his dismissal as Renofa Yamaguchi manager, Shigaki was appointed as top team coach at J2 League club Júbilo Iwata, returning to the club after nine years.

== Managerial career ==
=== Vanraure Hachinohe ===
In 2022, he was named as a coach at Thai club BG Pathum United, until midway through the season, he was appointed as the successor of Masahiro Kuzuno at Vanraure Hachinohe, Shigaki's first managerial role. In his first game, six days after his appointment, Vanraure lost 2–1 to AC Nagano Parceiro, however his first win was to follow in their next league game against Fukushima United. It was undoubtedly a difficult start for Shigaki, as his team lost nine of their first twelve games under his stewardship. The season did end on a high though, with the club winning eight of their last ten games of the season. It was decided at the end of the 2022 season that he would be leaving Vanraure Hachinohe.

=== FC Osaka ===
In December 2022, Shigaki was named as FC Osaka manager for the 2023 J3 League season – their first season in the J.League. It was another difficult start for Shigaki and his new club, finding themselves 19th in the table after the fifth match week, however they greatly improved as the season continued and were in second place in the league at the end of match week 26. FC Osaka finished the season in 11th place, with Shigaki having won 14 of his 38 games in charge.

=== Renofa Yamaguchi ===
Shigaki had impressed in his first full season as manager, and in December 2023, just before FC Osaka's final league game of the season, he was announced as manager of J2 League club Renofa Yamaguchi for the 2024 season. Shigaki also had a positive start with Renofa Yamaguchi, with the club pushing for play-off places until losing momentum in the latter stages of the season and eventually finishing in 11th place. This was a much improved position from their 20th-place finish in the previous season. The second season with the club proved to be more difficult and with Renofa finding themselves in the relegation zone with only three wins from twenty games, Shigaki was dismissed as manager of the club in June 2025.

=== Júbilo Iwata ===
At the end of the 2025 season, it was announced that Shigaki would take over as manager of the club, having been their top team coach since September 2025. In April 2026, after only 11 games and 2 wins in the J2/J3 100 Year Vision League, Shigaki was sacked by the club and replaced by Fumitake Miura.

== Personal life ==
In 2004, Shigaki was a finalist in the British Council's International Student Award and received a silver award and a £1,000 prize for his contribution.

== Managerial statistics ==
As of 22 April 2026

Managerial record by team and tenure
Team	From	To	Record								Ref.
Team	From	To	P	W	D	L	GF	GA	GD	Win %	Ref.
Vanraure Hachinohe	13 June 2022	14 December 2022	23	12	0	11	26	28	−2	52.17	
FC Osaka	15 December 2022	30 November 2023	38	14	11	13	41	38	+3	36.84	
Renofa Yamaguchi	1 December 2023	24 June 2025	67	21	19	27	76	86	−10	31.34	
Júbilo Iwata	23 December 2025	22 April 2026	11	2	4	5	8	13	−5	18.18	
Total			139	49	34	56	151	165	−14	35.25	
