= Kazuki Dohana =

Japanese footballer

Personal information
- Date of birth: 5 December 1998 (age 27)
- Place of birth: Takatsuki, Osaka, Japan
- Height: 1.77 m (5 ft 10 in)
- Position: Defender

Team information
- Current team: Shonan Bellmare
- Number: 15

Youth career
- Senrioka FC
- 2014–2016: Vissel Kobe

College career
Years	Team	Apps	(Gls)
2017–2020	Biwako Seikei Sport College		

Senior career*
Years	Team	Apps	(Gls)
2021–2024	Fukushima United	97	(3)
2024–	Iwaki FC	42	(6)
- * Club domestic league appearances and goals as of 1 January 2026

Kazuki Dohana (堂鼻 起暉, Dohana Kazuki; born 5 December 1998) is a Japanese footballer currently playing as a defender for J2 League club Shonan Bellmare.

== Career ==
In July 2024, Dohana transferred to J2 League club Iwaki FC.

== Career statistics ==
As of 14 July 2024

Appearances and goals by club, season and competition
Club	Season	League			Emperor's Cup		J. League Cup		Other		Total	
Club	Season	Division	Apps	Goals	Apps	Goals	Apps	Goals	Apps	Goals	Apps	Goals
Fukushima United	2021	J3 League	26	1	0	0	–		–		26	1
Fukushima United	2022	J3 League	29	0	1	0	–		–		30	0
Fukushima United	2023	J3 League	23	0	1	0	–		–		24	0
Fukushima United	2024	J3 League	19	2	1	0	1	0	–		21	2
Fukushima United	Total		97	3	3	0	1	0	0	0	101	3
Iwaki FC	2024	J2 League	1	1	0	0	0	0	–		1	1
Career total			98	4	3	0	1	0	0	0	102	4
