= Kotaro Tachikawa =

Japanese professional footballer

Kotaro Tachikawa 立川 小太郎
Personal information
- Date of birth: 4 January 1997 (age 29)
- Place of birth: Wakayama, Japan
- Height: 1.88 m (6 ft 2 in)
- Position: Goalkeeper

Team information
- Current team: FC Imabari
- Number: 1

Youth career
- –2008: Tomida SSS
- 2009–2011: Tomida Junior High School
- 2012–2014: Hatsushiba Hashimoto High School

College career
Years	Team	Apps	(Gls)
2015–2018	Osaka University H&SS		

Senior career*
Years	Team	Apps	(Gls)
2019–2020	Nagano Parceiro	13	(0)
2021–2023	Shonan Bellmare	0	(0)
2024	Iwaki FC	36	(0)
2025-	FC Imabari	45	(0)
- * Club domestic league appearances and goals as of 17 August 2026

Kotaro Tachikawa (立川 小太郎, Tachikawa Kotarō; born 4 January 1997) is a Japanese professional footballer who plays as a goalkeeper for club FC Imabari.

== Early life ==
Kotaro was born in Wakayama. He went to Osaka University of Health and Sport Sciences.

== Career ==
Kotaro made his debut for Nagano on 8 June 2019.

== Career statistics ==
As of 28 April 2024

Appearances and goals by club, season and competition
Club	Season	League			Emperor's Cup		J. League Cup		Other		Total	
Club	Season	Division	Apps	Goals	Apps	Goals	Apps	Goals	Apps	Goals	Apps	Goals
Nagano Parceiro	2019	J3 League	5	0	1	0	–		–		6	0
Nagano Parceiro	2020	J3 League	8	0	0	0	–		–		8	0
Nagano Parceiro	Total		13	0	1	0	0	0	0	0	14	0
Shonan Bellmare	2021	J1 League	0	0	2	0	0	0	–		2	0
Shonan Bellmare	2022	J1 League	0	0	1	0	1	0	–		2	0
Shonan Bellmare	2023	J1 League	0	0	0	0	0	0	–		0	0
Shonan Bellmare	Total		0	0	3	0	1	0	0	0	4	0
Iwaki FC	2024	J2 League	11	0	0	0	0	0	–		11	0
Career total			24	0	4	0	1	0	0	0	29	0
