= Ryusuke Otomo =

Japanese association football player

Personal information
- Full name: Ryusuke Otomo
- Date of birth: May 24, 2000 (age 26)
- Place of birth: Omagari, Daisen, Akita, Japan
- Height: 1.86 m (6 ft 1 in)
- Position: Goalkeeper

Team information
- Current team: Azul Claro Numazu
- Number: 31

Youth career
- Omagari Junior High School
- Montedio Yamagata

Senior career*
Years	Team	Apps	(Gls)
2019–2023	Montedio Yamagata	1	(0)
2020–2021	→ Azul Claro Numazu(loan)	20	(0)
2024–	Azul Claro Numazu	0	(0)
- * Club domestic league appearances and goals as of 31 August 2023

Ryusuke Otomo (大友竜輔, Otomo Ryusuke; born May 24, 2000) is a Japanese football player for Azul Claro Numazu.

== Club statistics ==
Updated to 7 December 2022.

Appearances and goals by club, season and competition
Club	Season	League			Emperor's Cup		J.League Cup		Total	
Club	Season	Division	Apps	Goals	Apps	Goals	Apps	Goals	Apps	Goals
Montedio Yamagata	2017	J2 League	0	0	0	0	–		0	0
Montedio Yamagata	2019	J2 League	0	0	0	0	–		0	0
Azul Claro Numazu	2020	J3 League	0	0	0	0	–		0	0
Azul Claro Numazu	2021	J3 League	20	0	0	0	–		20	0
Montedio Yamagata	2022	J2 League	1	0	0	0	–		1	0
Total			21	0	0	0	0	0	21	0
