= Kaina Tanimura =

Japanese footballer

Kaina Tanimura 谷村海那
Personal information
- Date of birth: 5 March 1998 (age 28)
- Place of birth: Iwate Prefecture, Japan
- Height: 1.81 m (5 ft 11 in)
- Position: Forward

Team information
- Current team: Yokohama F. Marinos
- Number: 9

Youth career
- Grulla Morioka
- Renuovens Ogasa FC
- 2010–2012: Omiya Junior High School
- 2013–2015: Hanamaki Higashi High School

College career
| Years | Team | Apps | (Gls) |
| 2016–2019 | Kokushikan University | | |

Senior career*
| Years | Team | Apps | (Gls) |
| 2020–2025 | Iwaki FC | 160 | (46) |
| 2025– | Yokohama F. Marinos | 42 | (22) |

International career^{‡}
| 2026– | Japan | 2 | (0) |
- * Club domestic league appearances and goals as of 10:00, 21 September 2026 (UTC) ‡ National team caps and goals as of 14:05, 1 October 2026 (UTC)

Kaina Tanimura (谷村海那, Tanimura Kaina; born 5 March 1998) is a Japanese professional footballer who plays as a forward for J1 League club Yokohama F. Marinos and the Japan national team.

== Youth career ==
Tanimura was captain of his high school team before moving on to Kokushikan University. He scored on his debut for his university, after coming on as a substitute in a 3–2 JUFA Kanto League 1 game against Sendai University. However, he did not play regularly for Kokushikan in his first or second year, only making four appearances in 2016 and 2017. From 2019, Tanimura did start to get more game time and made 10 appearances in 2018 scoring 1 goal, and a further 21 appearances in 2019 scoring 4 goals. He also received his first red card in his career in his final year. All in all, he represented his university 35 times, scoring 6 goals.

== Club career ==
=== Iwaki FC ===
In 2020, Tanimura moved to the Japan Football League club Iwaki FC. He made his debut for the club in August 2020, coming on as a late substitute in a 4–1 league defeat to Verspah Oita. On his first start in the following month, Tanimura scored his first goals for Iwaki, scoring two goals in a 4–3 league victory over Kochi United SC. Tanimura went on to make a few more short appearances throughout the rest of the season, playing 9 times across all competitions, scoring 3 goals in total.

In 2021, he played 24 games and scored 6 goals, as Iwaki were crowned champions of the JFL and were promoted to the J3 League for the first time in their history.

In 2022, Tanimura was largely used as an impact player from the bench in his first season in the J3 League. In spite of his relatively low amount of minutes played, he did manage to score 6 goals during the season, all of which came from appearing as a substitute. He appeared in 29 games as Iwaki were crowned champions of the J3 League and were promoted to the J2 League for the first time in their history. On 12 December 2022, Tanimura renewed his contract with club for the 2023 season.

He scored on the opening match of the 2023 season in a 3–2 defeat to Fujieda MYFC.

=== Yokohama F. Marinos ===
On 6 July 2025, it was announced that Tanimura would be joining J1 League club Yokohama F. Marinos. Later that month, Tanimura scored on his debut in a 3–0 league victory over Nagoya Grampus. He finished the 2025 season with 6 goals in 16 games across all competitions for Marinos.

In the 2026 J1 100 Year Vision League, Tanimura scored 10 goals in 19 appearances, finishing as joint top scorer in the competition.

== International career ==
On 17 September 2026, Tanimura earned his first national team call-up and was included in the 31-man squad for the 2026 Kirin Cup Soccer competition. He made his international debut on 28 September 2026, appearing as a substitute in a 2–1 victory over Venezuela in the 2026 Kirin Challenge Cup.

== Career statistics ==
=== Club ===
As of 19 September 2026.

Appearances and goals by club, season and competition
| Club | Season | League | | | Emperor's Cup | | J. League Cup | | Total | |
| Club | Season | Division | Apps | Goals | Apps | Goals | Apps | Goals | Apps | Goals |
|---|---|---|---|---|---|---|---|---|---|---|
| Iwaki FC | 2020 | JFL | 7 | 2 | 2 | 1 | – | | 9 | 3 |
| Iwaki FC | 2021 | JFL | 23 | 5 | 1 | 1 | – | | 24 | 6 |
| Iwaki FC | 2022 | J3 League | 29 | 6 | 0 | 0 | – | | 29 | 6 |
| Iwaki FC | 2023 | J2 League | 41 | 7 | 1 | 0 | – | | 42 | 7 |
| Iwaki FC | 2024 | J2 League | 38 | 18 | 1 | 0 | 1 | 0 | 40 | 18 |
| Iwaki FC | 2025 | J2 League | 22 | 8 | 1 | 1 | 0 | 0 | 23 | 9 |
| Iwaki FC | Total | | 160 | 46 | 6 | 3 | 1 | 0 | 167 | 49 |
| Yokohama F. Marinos | 2025 | J1 League | 15 | 6 | 0 | 0 | 1 | 0 | 16 | 6 |
| Yokohama F. Marinos | 2026 | J1 (100) | 19 | 10 | – | | – | | 19 | 10 |
| Yokohama F. Marinos | 2026–27 | J1 League | 8 | 6 | 1 | 0 | 0 | 0 | 9 | 6 |
| Yokohama F. Marinos | Total | | 42 | 22 | 1 | 0 | 1 | 0 | 44 | 22 |
| Career total | | | 202 | 68 | 7 | 3 | 2 | 0 | 211 | 71 |

== Honours ==
Iwaki FC

- Japan Football League : 2021
- J3 League : 2022

Individual

- J2 League Best XI: 2024

== Personal life ==
His elder brother Kenichi Tanimura is also a footballer who has played in the J.League.
