= Shintaro Kokubu =

Japanese footballer (born 1994)

Shintaro Kokubu 國分 伸太郎
Personal information
- Full name: Shintaro Kokubu
- Date of birth: August 31, 1994 (age 32)
- Place of birth: Okayama, Japan
- Height: 1.72 m (5 ft 7 1/2 in)
- Position: Midfielder

Team information
- Current team: Montedio Yamagata
- Number: 25

Youth career
- Toyama SSS
- –2009: Sanfrecce Bingo
- 2010–2012: Oita Trinita

College career
Years	Team	Apps	(Gls)
2013–2016	Ritsumeikan University		

Senior career*
Years	Team	Apps	(Gls)
2017–	Oita Trinita	23	(0)
2019–2020	→ Giravanz Kitakyushu (loan)	62	(4)
2021–	Montedio Yamagata	193	(14)
- * Club domestic league appearances and goals as of 13 August 2026

Shintaro Kokubu (國分 伸太郎, Kokubu Shintaro; born August 31, 1994) is a Japanese football player. He plays for Montedio Yamagata.

== Career ==
Shintaro Kokubu joined J2 League club Oita Trinita in 2017.

== Club statistics ==
Updated to 28 July 2022.

Club performance			League		Cup		Total	
Season	Club	League	Apps	Goals	Apps	Goals	Apps	Goals
Japan			League		Emperor's Cup		Total	
2017	Oita Trinita	J2 League	13	0	2	0	15	0
2018	Oita Trinita	J2 League	10	0	1	0	11	0
2019	Giravanz Kitakyushu	J2 League	29	2	2	0	31	2
2020	Giravanz Kitakyushu	J2 League	33	2	–		33	2
2021	Montedio Yamagata	J2 League	36	1	1	0	37	1
2022	Montedio Yamagata	J2 League	24	2	0	0	24	2
Total			145	7	6	0	151	7
