= Shuhei Yomoda =

Japanese footballer and manager

Shuhei Yomoda 四方田 修平
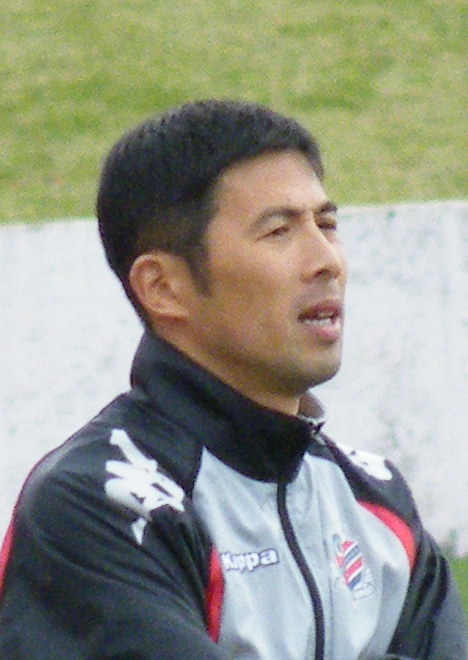

Personal information
- Date of birth: March 14, 1973 (age 53)
- Place of birth: Chiba, Chiba, Japan
- Height: 1.80 m (5 ft 11 in)

Team information
- Current team: Oita Trinita (manager)

Youth career
- 1989–1991: Narashino High School

College career
Years	Team	Apps	(Gls)
1992–1995	Juntendo University		

Managerial career
- 2004–2015: Hokkaido Consadole Sapporo U-18
- 2015–2017: Hokkaido Consadole Sapporo
- 2022–2025: Yokohama FC
- 2026–: Oita Trinita

Shuhei Yomoda (四方田 修平, Yomoda Shūhei; born March 14, 1973) is a Japanese professional football manager and former player.

== Coaching career ==
Yomoda was born in Chiba on March 14, 1973. He attended Juntendo University before becoming a football coach for University of Tsukuba. He was also a scout for Japan national team under Takeshi Okada tenure and he entered Consadole Sapporo (later Hokkaido Consadole Sapporo) staff when Okada joined the club as manager.

For several years, Yomoda coached the U-18 squad: after the club fired Ivica Barbarić in July 2015, he was appointed as first-squad manager. Yomoda led Consadole to J2 League champions in 2016 season and Consadole was promoted to J1 League. In 2018, Consadole signed with new manager Mihailo Petrović, so Yomoda became an assistant coach.

In 10 December 2021, Yomoda signed as manager of J2 relegated club, Yokohama FC after Tomonobu Hayakawa resign from club because worst performance his club relegation to J2. On 23 October 2022, Yomoda brought his club promotion to the J1 League after missing a season of playing because last season they were relegated to bottom position.

== Managerial statistics ==
Team	From	To	Record				
Team	From	To	G	W	D	L	Win %
Hokkaido Consadole Sapporo	2015	2018	102	49	19	34	48.04
Yokohama FC	2022		129	57	32	40	44.19
Total			221	96	51	74	43.44

== Honours ==
=== Manager ===
Consadole Sapporo

- J2 League (champions) : 2016

Yokohama FC

- J2 League (Runner-up) : 2022
