= Yuta Kumamoto =

Japanese footballer

Yuta Kumamoto 熊本雄太
Personal information
- Full name: Yuta Kumamoto
- Date of birth: July 18, 1995 (age 31)
- Place of birth: Tagawa, Fukuoka, Japan
- Height: 1.86 m (6 ft 1 in)
- Position: Defender

Team information
- Current team: Montedio Yamagata
- Number: 3

Youth career
- –2010: Kawasaki FC
- 2011–2013: Higashi Fukuoka High School

College career
| Years | Team | Apps | (Gls) |
| 2014–2017 | Waseda University | | |

Senior career*
| Years | Team | Apps | (Gls) |
| 2018–2021 | Montedio Yamagata | 131 | (2) |
| 2022 | Avispa Fukuoka | 5 | (0) |
| 2023– | Montedio Yamagata | 58 | (1) |
- * Club domestic league appearances and goals as of 13 August 2026

Yuta Kumamoto (熊本雄太, Kumamoto Yuta; born July 18, 1995) is a Japanese footballer who plays as a defender for J2 League club Montedio Yamagata.

== Career ==
After being a protagonist at Waseda University football team, Kumamoto joined Montedio Yamagata for 2018 season, becoming an immediate starter under manager Takashi Kiyama.

In December 2021, it was announced Kumamoto would be joining Avispa Fukuoka after spending four seasons at Montedio Yamagata.

After a single season with Avispa, Kumamoto transferred back to Montedio Yamagata for the 2023 season.

== Career statistics ==
As of 21 April 2023.

Appearances and goals by club, season and competition
| Club | Season | League | | | Emperor's Cup | | J.League Cup | | Other | | Total | |
| Club | Season | Division | Apps | Goals | Apps | Goals | Apps | Goals | Apps | Goals | Apps | Goals |
|---|---|---|---|---|---|---|---|---|---|---|---|---|
| Montedio Yamagata | 2018 | J2 League | 34 | 0 | 4 | 0 | – | | – | | 38 | 0 |
| Montedio Yamagata | 2019 | J2 League | 38 | 1 | – | | – | | 2 (Note: J1/J2 Play-offs) | 0 | 40 | 1 |
| Montedio Yamagata | 2020 | J2 League | 39 | 0 | – | | – | | – | | 39 | 0 |
| Montedio Yamagata | 2021 | J2 League | 20 | 1 | 1 | 0 | – | | – | | 21 | 1 |
| Montedio Yamagata | Total | | 131 | 2 | 5 | 0 | 0 | 0 | 2 | 0 | 138 | 2 |
| Avispa Fukuoka | 2022 | J1 League | 5 | 0 | 4 | 0 | 5 | 0 | 0 | 0 | 14 | 0 |
| Montedio Yamagata | 2023 | J2 League | 1 | 0 | 0 | 0 | – | | – | | 1 | 0 |
| Career total | | | 137 | 2 | 9 | 0 | 5 | 0 | 2 | 0 | 153 | 2 |
