= Hayato Teruyama =

Japanese footballer

Personal information
- Full name: Hayato Teruyama
- Date of birth: 28 August 2000 (age 26)
- Place of birth: Chiba, Japan
- Height: 1.82 m (6 ft 0 in)
- Position: Defender

Team information
- Current team: Tochigi City FC (on loan from V-Varen Nagasaki)
- Number: 3

Youth career
- Kashiwa Reysol
- 2016–2018: Seiritsu Gakuen High School

Senior career*
Years	Team	Apps	(Gls)
2019–2023	Vegalta Sendai	9	(0)
2020	→ Azul Claro Numazu (loan)	8	(0)
2022	→ FC Imabari (loan)	22	(1)
2023	FC Imabari	24	(2)
2024	Iwaki FC	11	(4)
2024-	V-Varen Nagasaki	51	(0)
2026-	→ Tochigi City FC (loan)	2	(1)
- * Club domestic league appearances and goals as of 1 January 2026

Hayato Teruyama (照山 颯人, Teruyama Hayato; born 28 August 2000) is a Japanese footballer currently playing as a defender for Tochigi City FC, on loan from V-Varen Nagasaki.

== Career statistics ==
As of 1 April 2021.

Appearances and goals by club, season and competition
Club	Season	League			Emperor's Cup		J.League Cup		Other		Total	
Club	Season	Division	Apps	Goals	Apps	Goals	Apps	Goals	Apps	Goals	Apps	Goals
Vegalta Sendai	2019	J1 League	0	0	2	0	7	0	0	0	9	0
Vegalta Sendai	2020	J1 League	4	0	0	0	1	0	0	0	5	0
Vegalta Sendai	2021	J1 League	0	0	0	0	0	0	0	0	0	0
Vegalta Sendai	Total		4	0	2	0	8	0	0	0	14	0
Azul Claro Numazu (loan)	2020	J3 League	8	0	0	0	—		0	0	8	0
Career total			12	0	2	0	8	0	0	0	22	0
