= Takumi Yamada =

Japanese footballer (born 1989)

Takumi Yamada 山田 拓巳
Personal information
- Full name: Takumi Yamada
- Date of birth: November 25, 1989 (age 36)
- Place of birth: Tokyo, Japan
- Height: 1.70 m (5 ft 7 in)
- Position: Defender

Team information
- Current team: Montedio Yamagata
- Number: 6

Youth career
- 2005–2007: Ichiritsu Funabashi High School

Senior career*
Years	Team	Apps	(Gls)
2008–	Montedio Yamagata	389	(12)
Medal record
Montedio Yamagata
Runner-up	Emperor's Cup	2014
- * Club domestic league appearances and goals as of 13 August 2026

Takumi Yamada (山田 拓巳, Yamada Takumi; born November 25, 1989 in Tokyo) is a Japanese football player who plays for Montedio Yamagata.

== Career statistics ==
Updated to 26 July 2022.

Club performance			League		Cup		League Cup		Other		Total	
Season	Club	League	Apps	Goals	Apps	Goals	Apps	Goals	Apps	Goals	Apps	Goals
Japan			League		Emperor's Cup		League Cup		Other^{1}		Total	
2008	Montedio Yamagata	J2 League	0	0	0	0	–		–		0	0
2009	Montedio Yamagata	J1 League	2	0	1	0	0	0	–		3	0
2010	Montedio Yamagata	J1 League	3	0	2	0	4	0	–		9	0
2011	Montedio Yamagata	J1 League	5	0	1	0	1	0	–		7	0
2012	Montedio Yamagata	J2 League	9	0	2	0	–		–		11	0
2013	Montedio Yamagata	J2 League	33	1	1	0	–		–		34	1
2014	Montedio Yamagata	J2 League	33	1	6	1	–		2	0	41	2
2015	Montedio Yamagata	J1 League	7	0	3	1	1	0	–		11	1
2016	Montedio Yamagata	J2 League	38	3	2	0	–		–		40	3
2017	Montedio Yamagata	J2 League	32	1	1	0	–		–		33	1
2018	Montedio Yamagata	J2 League	33	0	4	0	–		–		37	0
2019	Montedio Yamagata	J2 League	41	3	0	0	–		2	0	41	3
2020	Montedio Yamagata	J2 League	40	0	–		–		–		40	0
2021	Montedio Yamagata	J2 League	42	0	0	0	–		–		42	0
2022	Montedio Yamagata	J2 League	19	0	1	0	–		–		20	0
Career total			337	9	24	0	6	0	4	0	371	9

== See also ==
- List of one-club men in association football
