= Kotaro Arima =

Japanese footballer

Kotaro Arima 有馬 幸太郎
Personal information
- Full name: Kotaro Arima
- Date of birth: 3 September 2000 (age 26)
- Place of birth: Omitama, Ibaraki, Japan
- Height: 1.81 m (5 ft 11 in)
- Position: Forward

Team information
- Current team: Oita Trinita
- Number: 9

Youth career
- –2019: Kashima Antlers

Senior career*
Years	Team	Apps	(Gls)
2019–2022	Kashima Antlers	0	(0)
2020–2022	→ Tochigi SC (loan)	28	(1)
2022–2024	Iwaki FC	75	(19)
2025–	Oita Trinita	39	(6)
- * Club domestic league appearances and goals as of 16 August 2026

Kotaro Arima (有馬 幸太郎, Arima Kotaro; born 3 September 2000) is a Japanese professional footballer who plays as a forward for J2 League club Oita Trinita.

== Career statistics ==
=== Club ===
As of 18 March 2023.

Club	Season	League			National Cup		League Cup		Other		Total	
Club	Season	Division	Apps	Goals	Apps	Goals	Apps	Goals	Apps	Goals	Apps	Goals
Kashima Antlers	2019	J1 League	0	0	2 (Note: Appearances in the Emperor's Cup)	1	0	0	0	0	2	1
Kashima Antlers	2020	J1 League	0	0	0	0	0	0	0	0	0	0
Kashima Antlers	2021	J1 League	0	0	0	0	0	0	0	0	0	0
Kashima Antlers	Total		0	0	2	1	0	0	0	0	2	1
Tochigi SC (loan)	2020	J2 League	21	1	0	0	0	0	0	0	21	1
Tochigi SC (loan)	2021	J2 League	21	0	1	0	0	0	0	0	22	0
Tochigi SC (loan)	Total		42	1	1	0	0	0	0	0	43	1
Iwaki FC	2022	J3 League	24	8	0	0	0	0	0	0	24	8
Iwaki FC	2023	J2 League	0	0	0	0	0	0	0	0	0	0
Iwaki FC	Total		24	8	0	0	0	0	0	0	24	8
Career total			64	9	3	1	0	0	0	0	69	10

== Honours ==
=== Club ===
Iwaki FC

- J3 League: 2022
