= Keisuke Nishimura =

Japanese footballer

Personal information
- Date of birth: 19 February 1998 (age 28)
- Place of birth: Chiba, Japan
- Height: 1.87 m (6 ft 2 in)
- Position: Defender

Team information
- Current team: Montedio Yamagata
- Number: 4

Youth career
- –2012: Kashiwa Eagles
- 2013–2015: Narashino High School

College career
Years	Team	Apps	(Gls)
2016–2019	Senshu University		

Senior career*
Years	Team	Apps	(Gls)
2020–2023	Omiya Ardija	94	(5)
2023	→ Montedio Yamagata (loan)	30	(0)
2024–	Montedio Yamagata	69	(4)
- * Club domestic league appearances and goals as of 13 August 2026

Keisuke Nishimura (西村 慧祐, Nishimura Keisuke; born 19 February 1998) is a Japanese footballer currently playing as a defender for Montedio Yamagata.

== Career statistics ==
=== Club ===
As of 12 November 2020.

Club	Season	League			National Cup		League Cup		Other		Total	
Club	Season	Division	Apps	Goals	Apps	Goals	Apps	Goals	Apps	Goals	Apps	Goals
Omiya Ardija	2020	J2 League	25	1	0	0	0	0	0	0	25	1
Career total			25	1	0	0	0	0	0	0	25	1
