= Sōsuke Shibata =

Japanese footballer (born 2001)

Sōsuke Shibata 柴田 壮介
Personal information
- Full name: Sōsuke Shibata
- Date of birth: May 26, 2001 (age 25)
- Place of birth: Nagasaki, Japan
- Height: 1.68 m (5 ft 6 in)
- Position: Midfielder

Team information
- Current team: Iwaki FC
- Number: 8

Youth career
- FC Glanz Umeda
- Shonan Bellmare

Senior career*
Years	Team	Apps	(Gls)
2018–2025	Shonan Bellmare	19	(0)
2022-2023	→ Kataller Toyama (loan)	17	(0)
2024	→ Vanraure Hachinohe (loan)	20	(2)
2024-2025	→ Iwaki FC (loan)	39	(3)
2026-	Iwaki FC	8	(2)
Medal record
Shonan Bellmare
Winner	J.League Cup	2018
- * Club domestic league appearances and goals as of 1 January 2026

Sōsuke Shibata (柴田 壮介, Shibata Sōsuke; born May 26, 2001) is a Japanese footballer who plays as a midfielder for J2 League club Iwaki FC.

== Career ==
Shibata was born in Nagasaki Prefecture on May 26, 2001. He joined J1 League club Shonan Bellmare from youth team in 2018. After four seasons of playing for Shonan Bellmare, Shibata joined J3 League club Kataller Toyama on loan for the 2022 and 2023 seasons.

== Career statistics ==
As of 7 April 2023.

Appearances and goals by club, season and competition
Club	Season	League			Emperor's Cup		J. League Cup		Total	
Club	Season	Division	Apps	Goals	Apps	Goals	Apps	Goals	Apps	Goals
Shonan Bellmare	2018	J1 League	0	0	0	0	2	0	2	0
Shonan Bellmare	2019	J1 League	1	0	1	0	3	0	5	0
Shonan Bellmare	2020	J1 League	15	0	0	0	1	0	16	0
Shonan Bellmare	2021	J1 League	3	0	1	1	1	0	5	1
Shonan Bellmare	Total		19	0	2	1	7	0	28	1
Kataller Toyama (loan)	2022	J3 League	7	0	1	0	–		8	0
Kataller Toyama (loan)	2023	J3 League	1	0	0	0	–		1	0
Kataller Toyama (loan)	Total		8	0	1	0	0	0	9	0
Career total			27	0	3	1	7	0	37	1
