= Ayumu Kawai =

Japanese footballer

Ayumu Kawai 川井 歩
Personal information
- Full name: Ayumu Kawai
- Date of birth: 12 August 1999 (age 27)
- Place of birth: Iwakuni, Yamaguchi, Japan
- Height: 1.77 m (5 ft 9 1/2 in)
- Position: Midfielder

Team information
- Current team: Montedio Yamagata
- Number: 15

Youth career
- 2015–2017: Sanfrecce Hiroshima

Senior career*
Years	Team	Apps	(Gls)
2018–	Sanfrecce Hiroshima	0	(0)
2019–2020	→ Renofa Yamaguchi (loan)	51	(1)
2021	Renofa Yamaguchi	29	(2)
2022–	Montedio Yamagata	131	(1)
Medal record
Sanfrecce Hiroshima
Runner-up	J1 League	2018
- * Club domestic league appearances and goals as of 13 August 2026

Ayumu Kawai (川井 歩, Kawai Ayumu; born August 12, 1999) is a Japanese footballer who plays as a midfielder for J2 League club Montedio Yamagata.

== Playing career ==
Kawai was born in Yamaguchi Prefecture on August 12, 1999. He joined J1 League club Sanfrecce Hiroshima from youth team in 2018.

On 12 December 2021, Kawai announcement officially transfer to J2 club, Montedio Yamagata for 2022 season.

== Career statistics ==
=== Club ===
Updated to the start of 2023 season.

Club performance			League		Cup		League Cup		Total	
Season	Club	League	Apps	Goals	Apps	Goals	Apps	Goals	Apps	Goals
Japan			League		Emperor's Cup		League Cup		Total	
2018	Sanfrecce Hiroshima	J1 League	0	0	1	0	5	0	6	0
2019	Renofa Yamaguchi	J2 League	24	1	2	0	–		26	1
2020	Renofa Yamaguchi	J2 League	27	0	–		–		27	0
2021	Renofa Yamaguchi	J2 League	29	2	0	0	–		29	2
2022	Montedio Yamagata	J2 League	32	0	1	0	–		33	0
2023	Montedio Yamagata	J2 League	0	0	0	0	–		0	0
Career total			112	3	4	0	5	0	121	3
