= Ken Yamura =

Japanese footballer

Ken Yamura 矢村 健
Personal information
- Date of birth: 9 June 1997 (age 29)
- Place of birth: Meguro-ku, Tokyo, Japan
- Height: 1.68 m (5 ft 6 in)
- Position: Forward

Team information
- Current team: JEF United Chiba
- Number: 9

Youth career
- Vitoria Meguro
- Tokyo Musashino City
- 2013–2015: Ichiritsu Funabashi High School

College career
Years	Team	Apps	(Gls)
2016–2019	Niigata University of Health and Welfare		

Senior career*
Years	Team	Apps	(Gls)
2019–2025	Albirex Niigata	69	(9)
2023–2024	→ Fujieda MYFC (loan)	76	(25)
2025–2026	Fujieda MYFC	25	(4)
2026–	JEF United Chiba	1	(0)
- * Club domestic league appearances and goals as of 12 August 2026

Ken Yamura (矢村 健, Yamura Ken; born 9 June 1997) is a Japanese professional footballer who plays as a forward for JEF United Chiba.

== Career statistics ==
=== Club ===
As of end of 2024 season

Appearances and goals by club, season and competition
Club	Season	League			Emperor's Cup		J. League Cup		Other		Total	
Club	Season	Division	Apps	Goals	Apps	Goals	Apps	Goals	Apps	Goals	Apps	Goals
Niigata University of H&W	2016	–			1	0	–		–		3	0
Niigata University of H&W	2017	–			2	1	–		–		3	0
Niigata University of H&W	2018	–			1	0	–		–		3	0
Niigata University of H&W	2019	–			1	0	–		–		3	0
Niigata University of H&W	Total		0	0	5	1	0	0	0	0	5	1
Albirex Niigata	2019	J2 League	1	0	0	0	–		–		1	0
Albirex Niigata	2020	J2 League	19	1	0	0	–		–		19	1
Albirex Niigata	2021	J2 League	15	3	2	2	–		–		17	5
Albirex Niigata	2022	J2 League	11	1	1	0	–		–		12	1
Albirex Niigata	Total		46	5	3	2	0	0	0	0	49	7
Fujieda MYFC (loan)	2023	J2 League	38	9	1	0	–		–		39	9
Fujieda MYFC (loan)	2024	J1 League	38	16	1	0	1	0	–		40	16
Fujieda MYFC (loan)	Total		76	25	2	0	1	0	0	0	79	25
Career total			122	30	10	3	1	0	0	0	133	33
