= Junya Takahashi =

Japanese footballer

Junya Takahashi 高橋 潤哉
Personal information
- Date of birth: 28 May 1997 (age 29)
- Place of birth: Akita, Japan
- Height: 1.78 m (5 ft 10 in)
- Position: Forward

Team information
- Current team: Montedio Yamagata
- Number: 9

Youth career
- Osumi SSC
- FC Akita ASPRIDE
- –2015: Montedio Yamagata

College career
Years	Team	Apps	(Gls)
2016–2019	Komazawa University		

Senior career*
Years	Team	Apps	(Gls)
2019–	Montedio Yamagata	107	(26)
2021	→ Azul Claro Numazu (loan)	28	(6)
2022	→ Fukushima United (loan)	31	(8)
- * Club domestic league appearances and goals as of 13 August 2026

Junya Takahashi (高橋 潤哉, Takahashi Jun'ya; born 28 May 1997) is a Japanese footballer currently playing as a forward for Montedio Yamagata.

== Career ==
Belonged to Montedio Yamagata youth team from the first year of high school and served as captain in the third year. In June 2019, while studying at Komazawa University, it was decided to join Montedio Yamagata from the 2020 season, and at the same time he was approved as a JFA/J League special designated player. He became the first youth graduate to sign a professional contract through college.

From 2020, Junya officially joined J2 club, Montedio Yamagata.

In 2021, Junya loaned to J3 club, Azul Claro Numazu from Montedio Yamagata for a season.

In 2022, Junya loaned again to J3 club, Fukushima United for a season.

== Career statistics ==
=== Club ===
As of 30 November 2022.

Appearances and goals by club, season and competition
Club	Season	League			National Cup		League Cup		Other		Total	
Club	Season	Division	Apps	Goals	Apps	Goals	Apps	Goals	Apps	Goals	Apps	Goals
Montedio Yamagata Youth	2014		0	0	1	0	0	0	0	0	1	0
Montedio Yamagata	2020	J2 League	6	1	0	0	0	0	0	0	6	1
Montedio Yamagata	2021	J2 League	0	0	0	0	0	0	0	0	0	0
Montedio Yamagata	Total		6	1	0	0	0	0	0	0	6	1
Azul Claro Numazu (loan)	2021	J3 League	28	6	0	0	–		0	0	28	6
Fukushima United (loan)	2022	J3 League	31	8	2	4	–		0	0	32	8
Fukushima United (loan)	Total		59	14	2	4	0	0	0	0	61	18
Career total			65	15	3	4	0	0	0	0	68	19
