= V-Varen Nagasaki =

Japanese football club

V-Varen Nagasaki V・ファーレン長崎
- Full name: V-Varen Nagasaki
- Nickname: VVN
- Founded: 2004; 22 years ago
- Stadium: Peace Stadium Connected by SoftBank, Nagasaki, Nagasaki
- Capacity: 20,000
- Owner: Japanet Holdings
- Chairman: Hideki Iwashita
- Manager: Takuya Takagi
- League: J1 League
- 2026: J1 League, 17th of 20
- Website: v-varen.com
Home colours	Away colours

V-Varen Nagasaki (V・ファーレン長崎, Bi Fāren Nagasaki) is a Japanese professional football club based in Nagasaki, Capital of Nagasaki Prefecture. They will be competing in the J1 League, Japan’s top-tier professional football league, starting in the 2026–27 season after securing promotion from J2 in 2025.

== History ==
The club was established in 1985 as Ariake SC until the club decided to merge with Kunimi FC in 2004. The merger led the club to adopt the new name V-Varen Nagasaki in 2005, which has been used ever since.

V-Varen Nagasaki, since 2006, had been contending for the Kyūshū Soccer League championship and thus a place in the Japan Football League, but they only won it in November 2008, as second place in the Regional League promotion series.

In January 2009, they applied for J. League Associate Membership and their application was accepted at the J. League board meeting in February. In 2012, they won the Japan Football League title and thus promotion to the J. League Division 2. Five years later they won promotion to the J1 League for the first time after finishing runners-up in the 2017 season.

=== J. League: 2013 – ===
In preparation for the club's first season in the J. League Division 2 the club hired local-born Takuya Takagi as their coach for the season. On 3 March 2013 V-Varen Nagasaki played in their first ever J. League Division 2 match against Fagiano Okayama at the Kanko Stadium in Okayama in which the club drew the match 1–1 with Kōichi Satō scoring the first J. League Division 2 goal for V-Varen Nagasaki in the 25th minute. The club then played their first home match in the J. League Division 2 on 10 March 2013 at the Nagasaki Athletic Stadium against former J. League champions Gamba Osaka in which V-Varen Nagasaki lost 3–1 in front of a huge crowd of 18,153.

The club gained promotion into the J. League Division 2 in 2012 for the first time in their history after finishing as the champions in the 2012 Japan Football League and hired Nagasaki native Takuya Takagi to coach the club for the 2013 season.

On 11 November 2017, the club clinched promotion to the J1 League for the first time in their history after a 3–1 home win over Kamatamare Sanuki.

On 29 November 2025, the club secure promotion to J1 League after draw 1–1 against Tokushima Vortis in final matchweek at away game and return to top tier after six years absence.

=== Financial troubles ===
After facing dire financial difficulties, on 8 March 2017 the club was purchased by Japanet Holdings, the parent company of Japanese television shopping giant Japanet Takata Co., Ltd., becoming a fully owned subsidiary. Japanet have invested significant sums into the club, securing promotion to the top tier of Japanese football and publishing plans to build a new football-specific stadium on the former site of Mitsubishi's Nagasaki shipbuilding operations, which opened in 2024.

== Club name ==
The "V" in the club's name comes from the Portuguese word vitória (meaning 'victory') as well as the Dutch word vrede (meaning 'peace'), while varen is the Dutch verb meaning 'to sail', relating to Nagasaki's heritage as port of call of Portuguese and Dutch traders during the Sakoku period in the Tokugawa shogunate (see Dejima).

V-Varen Nagasaki unveiled a new club logo ahead of the 2025 season.

== Stadium ==
Their stadium, the Peace Stadium Connected by SoftBank, started construction in downtown Nagasaki in June 2022, and was completed in September 2024. The club played the first competitive match in the new stadium on October 6, 2024, beating Oita Trinita 4-1. SoftBank signed a partnership with V-Varen for 4 years.

V-Varen Nagasaki previously used the Transcosmos Stadium Nagasaki as its home stadium until the end of September 2024.

== League and cup record ==
Champions	Runners-up	Third place	Promoted	Relegated

League													J League Cup	Emperor's Cup
Season	Div	Teams	Pos.	P	W	D	L	F	A	GD	Pts	Attendance/G	J League Cup	Emperor's Cup
2008	Kyushu	18	2nd	18	14	1 (1)	2	76	10	66	46		Not eligible	Did not qualify
2009	JFL	18	11th	34	12	8	14	38	43	–5	44	2,763	Not eligible	Second round
2010	JFL	18	5th	34	15	8	11	50	38	12	53	2,525	Not eligible	Second round
2011	JFL	18	5th	33	15	11	7	61	44	17	56	1,513	Not eligible	Second round
2012	JFL	17	1st	34	20	7	5	57	24	33	67	3,656	Not eligible	Second round
2013	J2	22	6th	42	19	9	14	48	40	8	66	6,167	Not eligible	Second round
2014	J2	22	14th	42	12	16	14	45	42	3	52	4,839	Not eligible	Round of 16
2015	J2	22	6th	42	15	15	12	42	33	9	60	4,931	Not eligible	Second round
2016	J2	22	15th	42	10	17	15	39	51	–12	47	5,225	Not eligible	Second round
2017	J2	22	2nd	42	24	8	10	59	41	18	80	5,941	Not eligible	Second round
2018	J1	18	18th	34	8	6	20	39	59	–20	30	11,225	Group stage	Third round
2019	J2	22	12th	42	17	5	20	57	61	–4	56	7,737	Not eligible	Semi-finals
2020 †	J2	22	3rd	42	23	11	8	66	39	27	80	3,714	Not eligible	Did not qualify
2021 †	J2	22	4th	42	23	9	10	69	44	25	78	4,956	Not eligible	Fourth round
2022	J2	22	11th	42	15	11	16	50	54	–4	56	5,061	Not eligible	Round of 16
2023	J2	22	7th	42	18	11	13	70	56	14	65	7,300	Not eligible	Second round
2024	J2	20	3rd	38	21	12	5	74	39	36	75	9,814	Playoff round	Round of 16
2025	J2	20	2nd	38	19	13	6	63	44	19	70	15,877	Second round	Third round
2026	J1	10	TBD	18									N/A	N/A
2026–27	J1	20	TBD	38									TBD	TBD

Key

- Pos. = Position in league; P = Games played; W = Games won; D = Games drawn; L = Games lost; F = Goals scored; A = Goals conceded; GD = Goals difference; Pts = Points gained
- Attendance/G = Average home league attendance
- † 2020 & 2021 seasons attendances reduced by COVID-19 pandemic

== Honours ==
V-Varen Nagasaki honours
Honour	No.	Years
Japan Football League	1	2012
Kyushu Soccer League	1	2006
Nagasaki Prefectural Football Championship Emperor's Cup Nagasaki Prefectural Qualifiers	6	2006, 2007, 2009, 2010, 2011, 2012

== Current squad ==
As of 15 October 2026.

Note: Flags indicate national team as defined under FIFA eligibility rules; some limited exceptions apply. Players may hold more than one non-FIFA nationality.

No.	Pos.	Nation	Player
1	GK	JPN	Masaaki Goto
4	DF	BRA	Eduardo
5	MF	JPN	Hotaru Yamaguchi
6	DF	JPN	Yusei Egawa
7	MF	JPN	Kenshin Yasuda
8	MF	JPN	Yuto Iwasaki
9	FW	BRA	Thiago Santana
10	MF	BRA	Matheus Jesus
11	FW	JAM	Norman Campbell
13	GK	JPN	Go Hatano
14	MF	JPN	Takumi Nagura
16	MF	BRA	Emerson Deocleciano
17	DF	JPN	Keita Takahata
18	FW	JPN	Ryogo Yamasaki
19	MF	JPN	Takashi Sawada
20	MF	JPN	Keita Nakamura
21	MF	BRA	Diego Pituca

No.	Pos.	Nation	Player
22	MF	JPN	Hijiri Onaga
23	DF	JPN	Shunya Yoneda
24	MF	JPN	Riku Yamada
25	DF	JPN	Takuma Ominami
26	GK	JPN	Kaito Ioka
29	DF	JPN	Ikki Arai
30	GK	SRB	Luka Radotic
31	DF	JPN	Kanta Doi (on loan from FC Tokyo)
34	MF	JPN	Temmu Matsumoto
39	FW	KOR	Kou Reijin
41	MF	JPN	Motoki Hasegawa
44	MF	JPN	Harumu Nabeshima
45	DF	KOR	Roh Hyeong-Jun
46	MF	KOR	Choi Hae-seok
50	DF	JPN	Ryōsuke Shindō
88	MF	JPN	Asahi Masuyama (on loan from Machida Zelvia)
99	FW	BRA	Jonathan Júnior

=== Out on loan ===
Note: Flags indicate national team as defined under FIFA eligibility rules; some limited exceptions apply. Players may hold more than one non-FIFA nationality.

No.	Pos.	Nation	Player
33	MF	JPN	Tsubasa Kasayanagi (at (Belgium) Patro Eisden)
37	DF	JPN	Naru Sasaki (at Fukushima United FC)
48	DF	JPN	Hayato Teruyama (at Tochigi City FC)
—	MF	JPN	Taisei Abe (at (Germany) Holstein Kiel)

No.	Pos.	Nation	Player
—	MF	JPN	Ryota Saito (at (Taiwan) Taichung Futuro)
—	MF	JPN	Shunsuke Aoki (at Fujieda MYFC)
—	DF	JPN	Rio Tadokoro (at Kochi United)
—	DF	JPN	Haruki Shirai (at Vanraure Hachinohe)
—	FW	JPN	Serigne Saliou Diop (at Fukuyama City FC)

== Coaching staff ==
2025 Official club staff.

Notice of Coach Yusuke Murakami's retirement.

Position	Staff name
Manager	(Japan) Takuya Takagi
Head coach	(Japan) Ryotaro Tanaka
Coaches	(Japan) Akira Ito (Japan) Naoyuki Saito
Goalkeeper coach	(Japan) Takanori Miyoshi
Analytic coach	(Japan) Yukimura Yoshizawa
Chief physical coach	(Japan) Daiki Makino
Physical coach	(Japan) Keita Kikuchi
Interpreter	(Japan) Jefferson Youei Tonaki (Japan) Tetsuya Ozawa
Chief trainer	(Japan) Takeshi Mochizuki
Trainers	(Japan) Akira Migitaka (Japan) Yujiro Sakae (Japan) Hiroaki Shibata
Chief manager	(Japan) Takashi Yonetani
General manager	(Japan) Toshiya Wada
Kit man	(Japan) Keita Kusunoki

== Managerial history ==
Manager	Nationality	Tenure	
Manager	Nationality	Start	Finish
Fumiaki Iwamoto	Japan	1 February 2005	31 January 2008
Yoshinori Higashikawa	Japan	1 February 2008	13 June 2009
Takeshi Okubo	Japan	4 June 2009	30 June 2009
Fumiaki Iwamoto	Japan	1 July 2009	31 January 2010
Tōru Sano	Japan	1 February 2010	31 January 2013
Takuya Takagi	Japan	1 February 2013	31 January 2019
Makoto Teguramori	Japan	1 February 2019	31 January 2021
Takayuki Yoshida	Japan	1 February 2021	3 May 2021
Kazuki Satō	Japan	4 May 2021	6 May 2021
Hiroshi Matsuda	Japan	4 May 2021	12 June 2022
Takeo Harada (caretaker)	Japan	13 June 2022	30 June 2022
Fábio Carille	Brazil	1 July 2022	31 December 2023
Takahiro Shimotaira	Japan	1 February 2024	17 June 2025
Takuya Takagi	Japan	22 June 2025	present

== Kit evolution ==
Home kits - 1st
2005 - 2006	2007 - 2008	2009 - 2010	2011	2012
2013	2014	2015	2016	2017
2018	2019	2020	2021	2022
2023	2024	2025 -		

Away kits - 2nd
2005 - 2006	2007 - 2008	2009 - 2010	2011	2012
2013	2014 - 2015	2016	2017	2018
2019	2020	2021	2022	2023
2024	2025 -			

Alternative kits - 3rd
2015; Peace Memorial	2016; Peace Memorial	2017; Peace Memorial	2018; Peace Memorial	2019; Peace Memorial
2021; Peace Memorial	2022; Peace Memorial	2023; Peace Memorial	2024; Peace Prayer	2024; Peace Stadium; Opening Celebration
