= 2024 J2 League =

26th season of J2 League

J2 League
- Season: 2024
- Dates: 24 February – 10 November 2024
- Champions: Shimizu S-Pulse; 1st J2 League title
- Promoted: Shimizu S-Pulse; Yokohama FC; Fagiano Okayama
- Relegated: Tochigi SC; Kagoshima United; Thespa Gunma
- Matches: 380
- Goals: 946 (2.49 per match)
- Top goalscorer: Hiiro Komori (23 goals)
- Biggest home win: JEF United Chiba 8–0 Tochigi SC (3 April 2024)
- Biggest away win: Roasso Kumamoto 0–6 Iwaki FC (17 March 2024)
- Highest scoring: JEF United Chiba 8–0 Tochigi SC (3 April 2024)
- Highest attendance: 55,598; Shimizu S-Pulse 1–1 Yokohama FC (28 September 2024)
- Lowest attendance: 1,255; Thespa Gunma 0–2 Oita Trinita (3 April 2024)
- Total attendance: 2,913,415
- Average attendance: 7,667
- All statistics correct as of 17:00, 10 November 2024 (UTC).

The 2024 J2 League, also known as the 2024 Meiji Yasuda J2 League (Japanese: 2024 明治安田J2リーグ, Hepburn: 2024 Meiji Yasuda J2 Rīgu) for sponsorship reasons, was the 26th season of the J2 League, the second-tier Japanese professional league for association football clubs, since its establishment in 1999. It was the tenth season of the league since its rebrand from J.League Division 2.

== Overview ==
For the first time since 2011, the number of the clubs in the league decreased from 22 to 20.

This season, there were three automatic relegation spots to the J3 League (one more than the 2023 season) and two clubs gained automatic promotion to the J1 League. Like the previous season, the winner of the J2 promotion play-off were promoted to the top tier.

== Schedule ==
The league and match format was announced on 19 December 2023. The league began on 23 February and ended on 10 November in a round-robin format of 38 matches.

The J1 promotion play-off semi-finals took place on 1 December with the final taking place on 7 December.

== Changes from the previous season ==
Zweigen Kanazawa and Omiya Ardija were relegated to the 2024 J3 League, finishing the previous J2 League season as 21st and 22nd-placed teams, respectively.

Yokohama FC were the sole team to be relegated from the J1 League, after only one season in the top flight.

Both Machida Zelvia and Júbilo Iwata are promoted to the J1 League as champions and runners-up, respectively, of the previous J2 League season. Tokyo-based Machida will make their debut in the top flight of Japanese football, while Júbilo will make their immediate comeback to the J1. Joining the duo are Tokyo Verdy, who finished 3rd in 2023 and earned promotion after winning the promotion play-offs, thus making their first top flight appearance since 2008.

J3 winners Ehime FC and runners-up Kagoshima United were both promoted from the J3 League. Ehime are returning to the second-tier following two seasons in the J3 League and Kagoshima United will be playing only their second J2 season after five years absence.

From this season, Thespakusatsu Gunma changed their name to Thespa Gunma.

== Clubs ==
Locations of the 2024 J2 League teams

Club name	Hometown	Stadium	Capacity	Previous season rank	License
Blaublitz Akita	Akita	Soyu Stadium	18,560	J2 (13th)	J1
Ehime FC	All cities/towns in Ehime (Note: centering on Matsuyama)	Ningineer Stadium	20,919	J3 (1st)	J1
Fagiano Okayama	All cities/towns in Okayama (Note: centering on Okayama, Kurashiki, Tsuyama)	City Light Stadium	15,479	J2 (10th)	J1
Fujieda MYFC	Cities/towns in Shizuoka Prefecture	Fujieda Soccer Stadium	10,057	J2 (12th)	J1
Iwaki FC	Iwaki and Futaba District, Fukushima	Hawaiians Stadium Iwaki	5,066	J2 (18th)	J1
JEF United Chiba	Chiba & Ichihara, Chiba	Fukuda Denshi Arena	19,470	J2 (6th)	J1
Kagoshima United	Kagoshima	Shiranami Stadium	12,606	J3 (2nd)	J1
Mito HollyHock	All cities/towns in central and northern Ibaraki (Note: Mito, Hitachi, Hitachinaka, Kasama, Naka, Omitama, Hitachiota, Kitaibaraki, Hitachiomiya, Takahagi, Ibaraki, Shirosato, Oarai, Daigo, Tokai)	K's denki Stadium Mito	10,152	J2 (17th)	J1
Montedio Yamagata	All cities/towns in Yamagata (Note: centering on Yamagata, Tendo, Tsuruoka)	ND Soft Stadium	20,638	J2 (5th)	J1
Oita Trinita	Ōita Prefecture	Showa Denko Dome Oita	31,997	J2 (9th)	J1
Renofa Yamaguchi	All cities/towns in Yamaguchi	Ishin Me-Life Stadium	15,115	J2 (20th)	J1
Roasso Kumamoto	Kumamoto, Kumamoto	Egao Kenko Stadium	30,275	J2 (14th)	J1
Shimizu S-Pulse	Shizuoka	IAI Stadium Nihondaira	19,594	J2 (4th)	J1
Thespa Gunma	All cities/towns in Gunma (Note: centering on Maebashi)	Shoda Shoyu Stadium Gunma	15,253	J2 (11th)	J1
Tochigi SC	Utsunomiya, Tochigi	Kanseki Stadium Tochigi	25,244	J2 (19th)	J1
Tokushima Vortis	Tokushima Prefecture	Pocarisweat Stadium	17,924	J2 (15th)	J1
V-Varen Nagasaki	All cities/towns in Nagasaki Prefecture (Note: centering on Nagasaki and Isahaya)	Nagasaki Athletic Stadium	20,027	J2 (7th)	J1
Vegalta Sendai	Miyagi Prefecture	Yurtec Stadium Sendai	19,526	J2 (16th)	J1
Ventforet Kofu	All cities/towns in Yamanashi Prefecture (Note: centering on Kofu and Nirasaki)	JIT Recycle Ink Stadium	15,853	J2 (8th)	J1
Yokohama FC	Kanagawa Prefecture	Mitsuzawa Stadium	15,442	J1 (18th)	J1

=== Personnel and kits ===
Club	Manager	Captain	Kit manufacturer	Main shirt sponsor
Blaublitz Akita	(Japan) Ken Yoshida	(Japan) Hiroto Morooka	(Brazil) Athleta	TDK
Ehime FC	(Japan) Kiyotaka Ishimaru	(Japan) Kenta Tokushige	(Japan) Jogarbola	Ningineer Network
Fagiano Okayama	(Japan) Takashi Kiyama	(Japan) Ryo Takeuchi	(Brazil) Penalty	GROP
Fujieda MYFC	(Japan) Daisuke Sudo	(Japan) Masahiko Sugita	(Japan) Gol.	Seikan Kensa Center
Iwaki FC	(Japan) Yuzo Tamura	(Japan) Kengo Tanaka	(United States) Under Armour	BHC
JEF United Chiba	(Japan) Yoshiyuki Kobayashi	(Japan) Daisuke Suzuki	(Denmark) Hummel	Fuji Electric
Kagoshima United	(Japan) Tetsuya Asano	(Japan) Yuji Kimura	(Japan) Angua	Satsuma Shimabijin
Mito HollyHock	(Japan) Naoki Mori	(Japan) Koichi Murata	(Japan) soccer junky	K's Holdings
Montedio Yamagata	(Japan) Susumu Watanabe	(Japan) Shuto Minami	(Brazil) Penalty	ABeam
Oita Trinita	(Japan) Tomohiro Katanosaka	(Japan) Arata Watanabe	(Germany) Puma	Daihatsu Kyushu
Renofa Yamaguchi	(Japan) Ryo Shigaki	(Japan) Kota Kawano	(Brazil) Finta	upr
Roasso Kumamoto	(Japan) Takeshi Oki	(Japan) Rei Hirakawa	(Germany) Puma	Hirata
Shimizu S-Pulse	(Japan) Tadahiro Akiba	(Japan) Yoshinori Suzuki	(Germany) Puma	Suzuyo
Thespa Gunma	(Japan) Akira Muto	(Japan) Hajime Hosogai	(Spain) Kelme	Cainz
Tochigi SC	(Japan) Shinji Kobayashi	(Japan) Sho Sato	(Brazil) Athleta	TKC
Tokushima Vortis	(Japan) Kosaku Masuda	(Japan) Yoichiro Kakitani	(Japan) Mizuno	Otsuka Pharmaceutical (Pocari Sweat)
V-Varen Nagasaki	(Japan) Takahiro Shimotaira	(Japan) Hiroki Akino	(Italy) Macron	Japanet
Vegalta Sendai	(Japan) Yoshiro Moriyama	(Japan) Yasushi Endo	(Germany) Adidas	Iris Ohyama
Ventforet Kofu	(Japan) Shinji Otsuka	(Japan) Masahiro Sekiguchi	(Japan) Mizuno	Hakubaku
Yokohama FC	(Japan) Shuhei Yomoda	(Brazil) Gabriel	(Germany) Puma	Onodera Group

=== Managerial changes ===
Team	Outgoing manager	Manner of departure	Date of vacancy	Position in the table	Incoming manager	Date of appointment
Tochigi SC	(Japan) Yu Tokisaki	Resigned	6 November 2023	Pre-season	(Japan) Makoto Tanaka	5 December 2023
Oita Trinita	(Japan) Takahiro Shimotaira	Resigned	10 November 2023	Pre-season	(Japan) Tomohiro Katanosaka	30 November 2023
Vegalta Sendai	(Japan) Takafumi Hori	Resigned	13 November 2023	Pre-season	(Japan) Yoshiro Moriyama	27 November 2023
Renofa Yamaguchi	(Argentina) Juan Esnáider	Resigned	13 November 2023	Pre-season	(Japan) Ryo Shigaki	5 December 2023
V-Varen Nagasaki	(Brazil) Fábio Carille	Contract terminated (Note: On 19 December 2023, Carille was named Santos manager. Hours after his presentation, V-Varen Nagasaki claimed that Carille had already renewed his contract for 2024. They filed a lawsuit with FIFA, but eventually Carille's contract with Nagasaki was terminated on 15 February.)	15 February 2024	Pre-season	(Japan) Takahiro Shimotaira	15 February 2024
Tokushima Vortis	(Japan) Tatsuma Yoshida	Sacked	31 March 2024	20th	(Japan) Kosaku Masuda	7 May 2024
Mito HollyHock	(Japan) Yoshimi Hamasaki	Sacked	4 May 2024	19th	(Japan) Naoki Mori	9 May 2024
Thespa Gunma	(Japan) Tsuyoshi Otsuki	Sacked	6 May 2024	20th	(Japan) Akira Muto	8 May 2024
Tochigi SC	(Japan) Makoto Tanaka	Sacked	14 May 2024	19th	(Japan) Shinji Kobayashi	15 May 2024
Kagoshima United	(Japan) Yasuaki Oshima	Sacked	27 May 2024	18th	(Japan) Tetsuya Asano	29 May 2024
Ventforet Kofu	(Japan) Yoshiyuki Shinoda	Sacked	2 July 2024	14th	(Japan) Shinji Otsuka	2 July 2024

== Foreign players ==
As of the 2023 season, there are no more restrictions on a number of signed foreign players, but clubs can only register up to five foreign players for a single match-day squad. Players from J.League partner nations (Thailand, Vietnam, Myanmar, Malaysia, Cambodia, Singapore, Indonesia and Qatar) are exempt from these restrictions.

- Players name in **bold** indicates the player is registered during the midseason transfer window.
- Player's name in italics indicates the player has Japanese nationality in addition to their FIFA nationality, or is exempt from being treated as a foreign player due to having been born in Japan and being enrolled in, or having graduated from school in the country.

Club	Player 1	Player 2	Player 3	Player 4	Player 5	Player 6	Player 7	Former players
Blaublitz Akita								
Ehime FC	(Australia) Ben Duncan	(South Korea) Bak Keon-woo	(South Korea) Kang Sung-chan	(South Korea) Yu Ye-chan				
Fagiano Okayama	(Brazil) Gleyson	(Brazil) Lucão	(Germany) Svend Brodersen					(Brazil) Gabriel Xavier
Fujieda MYFC	(Brazil) Anderson Chaves	(Brazil) Carlinhos	(Brazil) Wendel					
Iwaki FC	(South Korea) **Hyun Woo-bin**	(South Korea) Joo Hyun-jin						(South Korea) Park Jun-yeong
JEF United Chiba	(Brazil) Dudu	(Brazil) Dudu Pacheco	(Brazil) Mendes					
Kagoshima United	(South Korea) Ono Cholhwan							
Mito HollyHock								
Montedio Yamagata								
Oita Trinita	(Brazil) Derlan	(Brazil) Matheus Pereira	(Brazil) Samuel	(South Korea) Kim Hyun-woo	(South Korea) Mun Kyung-gun			
Renofa Yamaguchi	(Brazil) Renan	(Brazil) Sílvio	(South Korea) Choi Hyung-chan	(South Korea) Kim Byeom-yong				(Thailand) **Sarach Yooyen**
Roasso Kumamoto	(South Korea) Bae Jeong-min							
Shimizu S-Pulse	(Brazil) Carlinhos Júnior	(Brazil) Douglas Tanque	(Brazil) Lucas Braga	(Ghana) **Abdul-Aziz Yakubu**	(United States) Jelani Reshaun Sumiyoshi			
Thespa Gunma								
Tochigi SC	(Brazil) Rafael Costa	(Nigeria) Origbaajo Ismaila	(South Korea) Kim Min-jun	(South Korea) Park Yong-ji				
Tokushima Vortis	(Brazil) Elsinho	(Brazil) Kaique	(Brazil) **Thales**	(Brazil) Tiago Alves	(Ghana) Wadi Ibrahim Suzuki	(Spain) José Aurelio Suárez		
V-Varen Nagasaki	(Brazil) Edigar Junio	(Brazil) Marcos Guilherme	(Brazil) Matheus Jesus	(Brazil) Valdo	(Serbia) Luka Radotić	(Spain) Juanma		
Vegalta Sendai	(Brazil) Eron	(Brazil) Matheus Moraes						
Ventforet Kofu	(Brazil) Adaílton	(Brazil) Eduardo Mancha	(Brazil) **Lucas Macula**	(Brazil) Renato Augusto	(Nigeria) Peter Utaka	(South Korea) Koh Bong-jo	(South Korea) Taiga Son	(Colombia) Fabián González
Yokohama FC	(Brazil) Caprini	(Brazil) Gabriel	(Brazil) **João Paulo**	(Brazil) Léo Bahia	(Brazil) **Michel**	(Brazil) Phelipe	(Brazil) Yuri Lara	(Vietnam) Nguyễn Công Phượng

== League table ==
Pos	Team	Pld	W	D	L	GF	GA	GD	Pts	Promotion or relegation
1	Shimizu S-Pulse (C, P)	38	26	4	8	68	38	+30	82	Promotion to the 2025 J1 League
2	Yokohama FC (P)	38	22	10	6	60	27	+33	76	Promotion to the 2025 J1 League
3	V-Varen Nagasaki	38	21	12	5	74	39	+35	75	Qualification for the promotion play-offs
4	Montedio Yamagata	38	20	6	12	55	36	+19	66	Qualification for the promotion play-offs
5	Fagiano Okayama (O, P)	38	17	14	7	48	29	+19	65	Qualification for the promotion play-offs
6	Vegalta Sendai	38	18	10	10	50	44	+6	64	Qualification for the promotion play-offs
7	JEF United Chiba	38	19	4	15	67	48	+19	61	
8	Tokushima Vortis	38	16	7	15	42	44	−2	55	
9	Iwaki FC	38	15	9	14	53	41	+12	54	
10	Blaublitz Akita	38	15	9	14	36	35	+1	54	
11	Renofa Yamaguchi	38	15	8	15	43	44	−1	53	
12	Roasso Kumamoto	38	13	7	18	53	62	−9	46	
13	Fujieda MYFC	38	14	4	20	38	57	−19	46	
14	Ventforet Kofu	38	12	9	17	54	57	−3	45	
15	Mito HollyHock	38	11	11	16	39	51	−12	44	
16	Oita Trinita	38	10	13	15	33	47	−14	43	
17	Ehime FC	38	10	10	18	41	69	−28	40	
18	Tochigi SC (R)	38	7	13	18	33	57	−24	34	Relegation to the 2025 J3 League
19	Kagoshima United (R)	38	7	9	22	35	59	−24	30	Relegation to the 2025 J3 League
20	Thespa Gunma (R)	38	3	9	26	24	62	−38	18	Relegation to the 2025 J3 League

Source: Meiji Yasuda J2 League, J.League Data Site
Rules for classification: 1) Points; 2) Goal difference; 3) Goals scored; 4) Head-to-head points; 5) Head-to-head goal difference; 6) Head-to-head goal scored; 7) Fair-play points.
(C) Champions; (O) Play-off winners; (P) Promoted; (R) Relegated

== Play-offs ==
The usual format was applied in the 2024 season. Promotion play-offs, officially called the 2024 J.League Road To J1 Play-offs (Note: On the official J.League English website, it is listed as J1 Promotion Play-Offs) (Japanese: 2024 J1昇格プレーオフ), was held from the semi-finals, where the match-ups were previously semi-determined. Based on the J2 placements at the end of the regular season, the third-placed team played against the sixth-placed, while the fourth-placed team played against the fifth-placed. The winners of the semi-finals played the final, with the winners promoted to the J1.

If a match was tied in the play-offs, the team with the higher rank won. The rank order was: J2's third, fourth, fifth, and sixth-placed teams.

Semi-finals
3	V-Varen Nagasaki	1
6	Vegalta Sendai	4
4	Montedio Yamagata	0
5	Fagiano Okayama	3

Final
5	Fagiano Okayama	2
6	Vegalta Sendai	0

=== Semi-finals ===
1 December 2024
13:05 JST

V-Varen Nagasaki	1–4	Vegalta Sendai
Matheus Jesus 76'	Report	Nakajima 31' (pen.), 90+1' Eron 53' Goke 68'

PEACE STADIUM Connected by SoftBank, Nagasaki
Attendance: 20,001
Referee: Yoshiro Imamura

1 December 2024
14:00 JST

Montedio Yamagata	0–3	Fagiano Okayama
Kawai (red card) 54'	Report	Motoyama 31' Iwabuchi 34' Kimura 84'

ND Soft Stadium Yamagata, Yamagata
Attendance: 18,006
Referee: Hayato Shimizu

=== Final ===
7 December 2024
13:05 JST

Fagiano Okayama	2–0	Vegalta Sendai
Sueyoshi 20'; Motoyama 61'	Report

City Light Stadium, Okayama
Attendance: 14,673
Referee: Masuya Ueda

== Season statistics ==
=== Top scorers ===
As of 10 November 2024

Rank	Player	Club	Goals
1	(Japan) Hiiro Komori	JEF United Chiba	23
2	(Brazil) Matheus Jesus	V-Varen Nagasaki	18
2	(Japan) Kaina Tanimura	Iwaki FC	18
4	(Japan) Ken Yamura	Fujieda MYFC	16
5	(Brazil) Edigar Junio	V-Varen Nagasaki	15
6	(Brazil) Adaílton	Ventforet Kofu	14
7	(Japan) Hiroto Iwabuchi	Fagiano Okayama	13
7	(Japan) Motohiko Nakajima	Vegalta Sendai	13
9	(Brazil) Marcos Guilherme	V-Varen Nagasaki	12
9	(Japan) Koya Kitagawa	Shimizu S-Pulse	12

== Awards ==
=== Monthly awards ===
Month	Manager of the Month		Monthly MVP		Goal of the Month		Young Player of the Month		References
Month	Manager	Club	Player	Club	Player	Club	Player	Club	References
February/March	(Japan) Takashi Kiyama	Fagiano Okayama	(Brazil) Gleyson	Fagiano Okayama	(Brazil) Matheus Jesus	V-Varen Nagasaki	(Japan) Hayato Tanaka	V-Varen Nagasaki	
April	(Japan) Takahiro Shimotaira	V-Varen Nagasaki	(Japan) Koya Kitagawa	Shimizu S-Pulse	(Japan) Kento Hashimoto	Tokushima Vortis	(Japan) Tsubasa Kasayanagi	V-Varen Nagasaki	
May	(Japan) Yoshiro Moriyama	Vegalta Sendai	(Japan) Motohiko Nakajima	Vegalta Sendai	(Japan) Shinya Yajima	Shimizu S-Pulse	(Japan) Harumi Minamino	Tochigi SC	
June	(Japan) Shuhei Yomoda	Yokohama FC	(Japan) Akito Fukumori	Yokohama FC	(Japan) Taishi Taguchi	JEF United Chiba	(Japan) Yusei Ozaki	Ehime FC	
July	(Japan) Kosaku Masuda	Tokushima Vortis	(Japan) Ryota Nagaki	Tokushima Vortis	(Japan) Ken Yamura	Fujieda MYFC	(Japan) Kota Kawano	Renofa Yamaguchi	
August	(Japan) Shuhei Yomoda	Yokohama FC	(Japan) Shoma Doi	Montedio Yamagata	(Brazil) Pereira	Oita Trinita	(Japan) Kenshin Yasuda	Oita Trinita	
September	(Japan) Susumu Watanabe	Montedio Yamagata	(Japan) Hiiro Komori	JEF United Chiba	(Japan) Daiki Watari	Tokushima Vortis	(Japan) Taisei Abe	V-Varen Nagasaki	
October	(Japan) Yoshiyuki Kobayashi	JEF United Chiba	(Brazil) Matheus Jesus	V-Varen Nagasaki	(Japan) Ken Yamura	Fujieda MYFC	(Japan) Toua Suenaga	Renofa Yamaguchi	
November/December	(Japan) Tadahiro Akiba	Shimizu S-Pulse	(Japan) Leo Takae	Montedio Yamagata	(Japan) Daichi Ishikawa	Roasso Kumamoto	(Japan) Yusei Yashiki	Oita Trinita	

== See also ==
- 2024 Japanese Super Cup
- 2024 Emperor's Cup
- 2024 J1 League
- 2024 J3 League
- 2024 Japan Football League
