= Montedio Yamagata =

Japanese football club

Montedio Yamagata モンテディオ山形
- Full name: Montedio Yamagata
- Nicknames: Monte; The Eagle Bees
- Founded: 1984; 42 years ago
- Stadium: ND Soft Stadium (Tendō, Yamagata)
- Capacity: 20,315
- Chairman: Kentaro Aita
- Manager: Akinobu Yokouchi
- League: J2 League
- 2025: J2 League, 10th of 20
- Website: montedioyamagata.jp
Home colours	Away colours

Montedio Yamagata (モンテディオ山形, Montedio Yamagata) is a Japanese professional association football club based in Tendō, Yamagata in the Yamagata Prefecture. The club currently plays in J2 League, the Japanese second tier of professional football.

== History ==
The club based in Tsuruoka was founded in 1984 as NEC Yamagata Soccer Club. It gained the promotion to the Japan Football League (former) in 1994. After renaming itself as Montedio Yamagata in 1996, it has been playing in J. League Division 2 since its inaugural 1999 season.

On 30 November 2008, they were promoted to J. League Division 1 for the first time. They achieved their highest league placing of 13th in 2010. However, in 2011, two strong loan players from Kashima Antlers were recalled. This weakened the squad which also suffered many injuries through the year and Montedio were relegated back to J.League Division 2 at the end of 2011. At the end of the season, the manager, Shinji Kobayashi, stepped down even though many fans praised his accomplishments over the past 4 years.

Yamagata returned to the J1 after spending three seasons in the J2 by winning the J1/J2 promotion playoff final in 2014. They returned to the J2 for the 2016 season, having spent only one season at the J1. The club is currently playing their 10th consecutive season in the J2 in 2025.

== Team image ==
=== Name origin ===
Montedio is a coined word combining the Italian word for "mountain" (Monte) and the word for "God" (Dio).

=== Rivalries ===
==== Ōu Honsen (Dewa derby) ====
NEC Yamagata and TDK first met in 1990 in old Tohoku regional football league. The two clubs have been based in former Dewa Province, and their rivalry is renamed as Ōu Honsen (奥羽本戦) after the Japan Railways Ōu Main Line (奥羽本線) in 2021.

- Battle of Ōshū

== Stadium ==
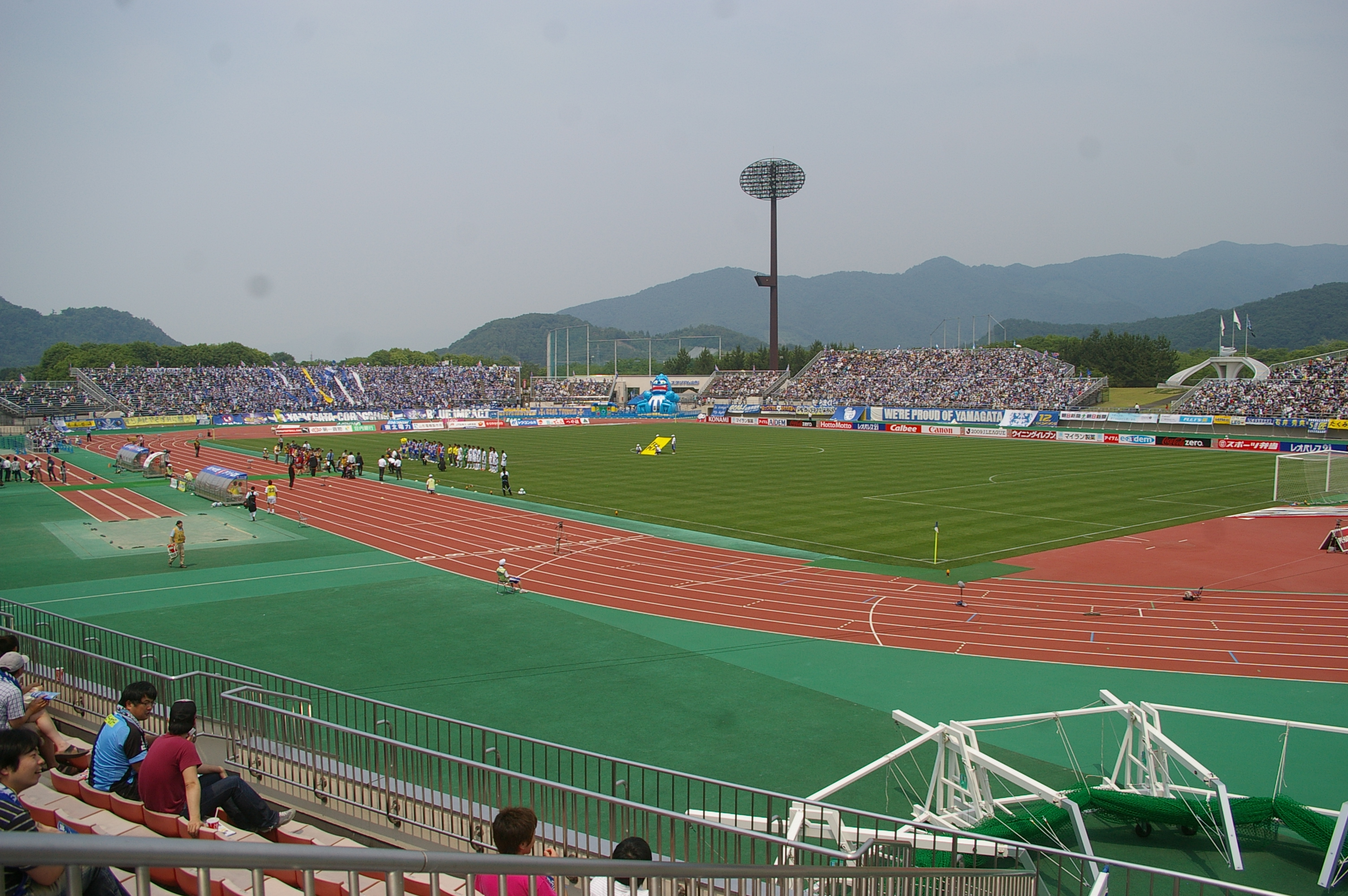
ND Soft Stadium Yamagata

Since joining the J.League, Montedio has been using the ND Soft Stadium Yamagata as their home stadium.

The new stadium, with a planned capacity of 21,292 spectators—similar to the current ND Stadium—will feature stands designed for cold regions and a full roof for spectators, in line with the J.League club license. Tendo Mayor Shinji Yamamoto has expressed plans to secure a new parking lot to replace the current one, which will serve as the construction site. Yamagata Prefecture Governor Mieko Yoshimura stated that the prefecture intends to cooperate with land use based on the mayor's plans.

== Kit suppliers and shirt sponsors ==
=== Kit evolution ===
Home Kit 1st
1999	2000–2002	2003–2004	2005 - 2006	2007
2008–2009	2010–2011	2012–2013	2014	2015–2016
2017	2018	2019	2020	2021
2022	2023	2024	2025 -	

Away Kit 2nd
1999	2000–2003	2004	2005–2006	2007
2008–2009	2010–2011	2012–2013	2014	2015
2016	2017	2018	2019	2020
2021	2022	2023	2024	2025 -

Other Kits - 3rd
2013; Summer 3rd	2018 3rd	2018; New breed debut	2019; Natsuni	2021; Natsuni
2022; Natsuuni	2023; 3rd	2023; Natsuuni	2024; Natsuuni	

== Players ==
=== First-team squad ===
As of 13 October 2026.

Note: Flags indicate national team as defined under FIFA eligibility rules; some limited exceptions apply. Players may hold more than one non-FIFA nationality.

No.	Pos.	Nation	Player
1	GK	JPN	Tsubasa Shibuya
2	DF	KOR	Dong-hee Lee
3	DF	JPN	Yuta Kumamoto
4	DF	JPN	Keisuke Nishimura
5	DF	JPN	Hayate Sugii
6	DF	JPN	Takumi Yamada
7	MF	JPN	Ryotaro Nakamura
8	MF	JPN	Shoma Doi
9	FW	JPN	Junya Takahashi
10	MF	JPN	Ryoma Kida
11	FW	JPN	Akira Silvano Disaro
13	DF	JPN	Hiroya Nodake
14	MF	JPN	Kaiyo Yanagimachi
15	DF	JPN	Ayumu Kawai
16	GK	JPN	Ko Hasegawa
17	MF	JPN	Tsubasa Terayama
18	MF	JPN	Rui Yokoyama

No.	Pos.	Nation	Player
20	MF	JPN	Kaina Yoshio
22	DF	JPN	Hayate Shirowa
23	MF	JPN	Shidou Tanaka
25	MF	JPN	Shintaro Kokubu
27	MF	JPN	Keigo Enomoto
30	MF	JPN	Yugasubedi Takenoya
32	GK	JPN	Taisei Kambayashi
34	GK	JPN	Ryusei Sato (on loan from Urawa Red Diamonds)
35	MF	JPN	Shogo Yamamoto ^{DSP}
38	DF	JPN	Riku Morioka
39	FW	JPN	Kaito Mori
49	DF	JPN	Kiriya Sakamoto
55	FW	JPN	Shunmei Horikane
60	GK	JPN	Rikuto Sato ^{Type 2}
61	DF	JPN	Kaito Homma ^{Type 2}
77	MF	JPN	Rennosuke Kawana
88	MF	BRA	Thalisson

=== Out on loan ===
Note: Flags indicate national team as defined under FIFA eligibility rules; some limited exceptions apply. Players may hold more than one non-FIFA nationality.

No.	Pos.	Nation	Player
—	DF	JPN	Toraji Chiba (at Fukushima United)
—	DF	JPN	Takashi Abe (at Tegevajaro Miyazaki)

No.	Pos.	Nation	Player
—	MF	JPN	Kaisei Kano (at Fukushima United)

== Management and staff ==
Club officials for 2025 season

Position	Name
Manager	(Japan) Akinobu Yokouchi
Coach	(Japan) Jin Sato (Japan) Ken Iwase (Japan) Keisuke Kaizaki (Japan) Ren Yumitani
Goalkeeper coach	(Japan) Yusaburo Matsuoka
Physical coach	(Japan) Kenta Hamabe
Analyst	(Japan) Daito Kai (Japan) Hinata Sakaguchi
Trainer	(Japan) Tsukasa Sato (Japan) Hiraku Toguri (Japan) So Adachi (Japan) Daigo Shigeoka
Team operations coordinator	(Japan) Masahiro Sasaki
General affairs	(Japan) Takuya Fukai (Japan) Takaaki Sakai
Interpreters	(Japan) Yuki Masuda (Japan) Kei Yoshida

== Honours ==
Montedio Yamagata honours
Honour	No.	Years
Yamagata Prefecture League	1	1989
Tohoku Soccer League	4	1990, 1991, 1992, 1993

== Managerial history ==
Manager	Tenure	
Manager	Start	Finish
(Japan) Shoichi Kato	1984	1989
(Japan) Masanobu Tashiro	1990	1993
(Japan) Naoki Sugisawa	1994	
(Japan) Nobuhiro Ishizaki	1 February 1995	31 January 1999
(Japan) Shigeharu Ueki	1 February 1999	31 January 2001
(Japan) Kōichi Hashiratani	1 January 2001	31 December 2003
(Japan) Jun Suzuki	1 February 2004	31 January 2006
(Japan) Yasuhiro Higuchi	1 February 2006	31 January 2008
(Japan) Shinji Kobayashi	1 February 2008	31 January 2012
(Japan) Ryōsuke Okuno	1 February 2012	31 January 2014
(Japan) Nobuhiro Ishizaki (2)	1 February 2014	31 January 2017
(Japan) Takashi Kiyama	1 February 2017	31 January 2020
(Japan) Kiyotaka Ishimaru	1 February 2020	21 April 2021
(Japan) Jin Satō	22 April 2021	29 April 2021
(Australia) Peter Cklamovski	30 April 2021	4 April 2023
(Japan) Susumu Watanabe	4 April 2023	18 June 2025
(Japan) Jin Satō (Interim)	18 June 2025	25 June 2025
(Japan) Akinobu Yokouchi	25 June 2025	Current

=== General managers ===
- (Japan) Shigetoshi Nakaigawa – 1986–1997, 2007–2019

== Season by season record ==
Champions	Runners-up	Third place	Promoted	Relegated

League										J.League Cup	Emperor's Cup
Season	Division	Teams	Pos	P	W	D	L	Pts	Attendance/G	J.League Cup	Emperor's Cup
1999	J2	10	7th	36	15	4	17	48	2,980	1st round	Quarter-finals
2000	J2	11	10th	40	11	2	27	33	3,468	1st round	2nd round
2001	J2	12	3rd	44	27	6	14	80	4,391	1st round	3rd round
2002	J2	12	11th	44	6	17	21	35	3,755	Not eligible	1st round
2003	J2	12	8th	44	15	10	19	55	4,370	Not eligible	3rd round
2004	J2	12	4th	44	19	14	11	71	6,420	Not eligible	4th round
2005	J2	12	5th	44	16	16	12	64	5,949	Not eligible	4th round
2006	J2	13	8th	48	17	14	17	65	5,085	Not eligible	4th round
2007	J2	13	9th	48	15	13	20	58	4,243	Not eligible	4th round
2008	J2	15	2nd	42	23	9	10	78	6,273	Not eligible	4th round
2009	J1	18	15th	34	10	9	15	39	12,056	Group stage	3rd round
2010	J1	18	13th	34	11	9	14	42	11,710	Group stage	Quarter finals
2011	J1	18	18th	34	5	23	6	21	9,325	1st round	3rd round
2012	J2	22	10th	42	16	13	13	61	7,355	Not eligible	3rd round
2013	J2	22	10th	42	16	15	11	59	7,020	Not eligible	4th round
2014	J2	22	6th	42	18	14	10	64	6,348	Not eligible	Runners up
2015	J1	18	18th	34	4	18	12	24	10,005	Group stage	4th round
2016	J2	22	14th	42	11	17	14	47	6,254	Not eligible	3rd round
2017	J2	22	11th	42	14	11	17	59	6,582	Not eligible	3rd round
2018	J2	22	12th	42	14	14	14	56	6,766	Not eligible	Semi-finals
2019	J2	22	6th	42	20	12	10	70	8,289	Not eligible	2nd round
2020 †	J2	22	7th	42	17	14	11	62	2,944	Not eligible	Did not qualify
2021 †	J2	22	7th	42	20	8	14	68	5,082	Not eligible	2nd round
2022	J2	22	6th	42	17	13	12	64	6,451	Not eligible	2nd round
2023	J2	22	5th	42	21	4	17	67	8,318	Not eligible	3rd round
2024	J2	20	4th	38	20	6	12	66	10,264	1st round	3rd round
2025	J2	20	10th	38	15	8	15	53	11,067	2nd round	4th round
2026	J2	40	28th	18	6	2	10	22	10,023	N/A	N/A
2026-27	J2	20	TBD	38						TBD	TBD

Key

- Pos. = Position in league; P = Games played; W = Games won; D = Games drawn; L = Games lost; 'Pts = Points gained
- Attendance/G = Average league home attendance
- † 2020 & 2021 seasons attendance reduced by COVID-19 worldwide pandemic
- Source: J.League Data Site
