= 2021 All Japan University Football Championship =

Tournament details
- Country: Japan
- Dates: 8–25 December 2021
- Teams: 24

Final positions
- Champions: Komazawa (7th title)
- Runners-up: Hannan

Tournament statistics
- Matches played: 23
- Goals scored: 65 (2.83 per match)
- Attendance: 8,640 (376 per match)
- Top goal scorer(s): Yusei Toshida (Komazawa, 4 goals)

Awards
- Best player: Shunta Araki (Komazawa)

The 2021 All Japan University Football Championship (第70回 全日本大学サッカー選手権大会; All Japan 70th University Football Championship) was the 70th edition of the referred annually contested cup for universities across Japan. As usual, the tournament was contested by 24 universities on a knockout-stage format. Meiji were the defending champions. In this edition, they ended up failing to defend their title, crashing out on the semi-finals by the eventual champions. Komazawa won the title for the seventh time in their 10th participation in finals, and for the first time since 2006. They were the fifth team in a row from Kanto to lift the trophy. Meanwhile, Hannan ended up as runners-up in their second appearance in the tournament's final, as they were also runners-up on 2015.

== Calendar ==
Round	Date	Matches	Clubs
First round	8 December 2021	8	16 → 8
Round of 16	11 December 2021	8	16 (8+8) → 8
Quarter-finals	14 December 2021	4	8 → 4
Semi-finals	18 December 2021	2	4 → 2
Final	25 January 2021	1	2 → 1

== Participating clubs ==
In parentheses: Each university's performance at the regional qualifying series.

Region	RP	University	Apps	Located on
Hokkaido	1st	Sapporo University	10th	Sapporo
Hokkaido	2nd	Tokai University Sapporo	1st	Sapporo
Tohoku	1st	Sendai University	37th	Miyagi
Kanto	1st	Ryutsu Keizai University	12th	Ibaraki
Kanto	2nd	Komazawa University	16th	Tokyo
Kanto	3rd	Meiji University	20th	Tokyo
Kanto	4th	Hosei University	32nd	Tokyo
Kanto	5th	Waseda University	34th	Tokyo
Kanto	6th	University of Tsukuba	39th	Ibaraki
Kanto	7th	Kokushikan University	27th	Tokyo
Hokushin'etsu	1st	Niigata University of Health and Welfare	7th	Niigata
Tokai	1st	Tokai Gakuen University	6th	Aichi
Tokai	2nd	Chukyo University	41th	Aichi
Tokai	3rd	Nagoya Keizai University	1st	Aichi
Kansai	1st	Kwansei Gakuin University	23rd	Hyogo
Kansai	2nd	Kyoto Sangyo University	7th	Kyoto
Kansai	3rd	Biwako Seikei Sport College	5th	Shiga
Kansai	4th	Hannan University	20th	Osaka
Chugoku	1st	International Pacific University	8th	Okayama
Shikoku	1st	Takamatsu University	2nd	Kagawa
Shikoku	2nd	Kochi University	34th	Kochi
Kyushu	1st	National Institute of Fitness and Sports in Kanoya	24th	Kagoshima
Kyushu	2nd	Fukuoka University	44th	Fukuoka
Kyushu	3rd	Miyazaki Sangyo-keiei University	4th	Miyazaki

== Schedule ==
The participating teams and match-ups were disclosed on 21 November 2021.

=== First round ===
8 December Match 1	Kokushikan	2–0	Tokai Sapporo	Sagamihara
10:30	Mizuki Uchida 23'; Akito Tanahashi 49'	Report		Stadium: Sagamihara Gion Stadium; Attendance: Yasuhiro Udagawa; Referee: 200

8 December Match 2	Niigata HW	1–0	Nagoya Keizai	Sagamihara
13:30	Hiiro Komori 79'	Report		Stadium: Sagamihara Gion Stadium; Attendance: 112; Referee: Shingo Kuniyoshi

8 December Match 3	Hannan	2–1	Chukyo	Maebashi
10:30	Masaya Fujiwara 21'; Shuji Ikeda 85'	Report	Shosei Usui 25'	Stadium: Maebashi Athletic Stadium; Attendance: 102; Referee: Masakazu Kato

8 December Match 4	Fukuoka	4–0	Takamatsu	Maebashi
13:30	Yamato Okada 4'; Hiroto Kurakazu 34'; Ryuki Yamaguchi 49', 90+3'	Report		Stadium: Maebashi Athletic Stadium; Attendance: 65; Referee: Takumi Shinoto

8 December Match 5	Miyazaki Sangyo-keiei	2–1 (a.e.t.)	Kochi	Saitama
10:30	Shu Yorimitsu 64'; Yosuke Suzuki 109'	Report	Own goal 41' (o.g.)	Stadium: Saitama Stadium 2002; Attendance: 87; Referee: Toru Kakinuma

8 December Match 6	Biwako Seikei	4–1	Sapporo	Narita
13:30	Subaru Sato 24', 50'; Koya Fujimatsu 45+4'; Kakeru Banki 84'	Report	Kohei Takahashi 13'	Stadium: Nakadai Sports Park Athletic Stadium; Attendance: 68; Referee: Takahito Seta

8 December Match 7	Sendai	0–1	Tokai Gakuen	Urayasu
10:30		Report	Mikito Fukuda 3'	Stadium: Urayasu Athletic Stadium; Attendance: 118; Referee: Takeshi Asada

8 December Match 8	Kyoto Sangyo	2–1 (a.e.t.)	International Pacific	Urayasu
13:30	Ayumu Nakano 64'; Yota Imaoka 116'	Report	Hiroto Kamimoto 7'	Stadium: Urayasu Athletic Stadium; Attendance: 101; Referee: Takashi Hara

=== Round of 16 ===
11 December Match 9	Ryutsu Keizai	2–1 (a.e.t.)	Niigata HW	Yokohama
10:30	Kyo Sato 75'; Yuta Miyamoto 111'	Report	Hiiro Komori 11'	Stadium: Hodogaya Park Soccer Field; Attendance: 354; Referee: Takuya Ujihara

11 December Match 10	Kokushikan	3–1	Kanoya	Nirasaki
10:30	Akito Tanahashi 18'; Ryo Arita 30'; Yuto Tsunashima 61'	Report	Ryo Nemoto 45'	Stadium: Nirasaki Central Park Athletics Stadium; Attendance: 164; Referee: Kei Suzuki

11 December Match 11	Hannan	1–0	Kwansei Gakuin	Maebashi
10:30	Masaya Fujiwara 39'	Report		Stadium: Maebashi Athletic Stadium; Attendance: 192; Referee: Yu Tezuka

11 December Match 12	Hosei	0–1	Fukuoka	Maebashi
13:30		Report	Reiju Tsuruno 81'	Stadium: Maebashi Athletic Stadium; Attendance: 167; Referee: Tomoyuki Umeda

11 December Match 13	Meiji	3–0	Miyazaki Sangyo-keiei	Koto
10:30	Hiroki Scharod Akai 21'; Yuta Fujihara 66'; Yosuke Murakami 90+1'	Report		Stadium: Yumenoshima Stadium; Attendance: 419; Referee: Yasuhiro Udagawa

11 December Match 14	Biwako Seikei	2–2 (a.e.t.) (4–3 p)	Waseda	Koto
13:30	Manato Kudo 55'; Yu Oshima 118'	Report	Yu Tabei 13'; Kai Kuramochi 109'	Stadium: Yumenoshima Stadium; Attendance: 467; Referee: Genki Tawara
	Penalties
	Koya Fujimatsu (penalty missed); Shosei Kozuki (penalty scored); Kodai Mori (penalty scored); Kotaro Katsuta (penalty scored); Subaru Sato (penalty scored)		(penalty missed) Toru Shibata; (penalty scored) Takumi Niwa; (penalty scored) Kai Kuramochi; (penalty scored) Hinata Ogura; (penalty missed) Hisatoshi Nishido

11 December Match 15	Tokai Gakuen	1–4	Komazawa	Urayasu
10:30	Andre Taiki Kinjo 86'	Report	Yusei Toshida 45', 62'; Shunta Araki 45+2'; Takumi Yonetani 90+3'	Stadium: Urayasu Athletic Stadium; Attendance: 218; Referee: Masashi Harada

11 December Match 16	Tsukuba	3–0	Kyoto Sangyo	Urayasu
13:30	Koshiro Sumi 44'; Masato Miura 52'; Kaito Mori 63'	Report		Stadium: Urayasu Athletic Stadium; Attendance: 283; Referee: Takahito Seta

=== Quarter-finals ===
14 December Match 17	Ryutsu Keizai	2–0	Kokushikan	Sagamihara
12:00	Taichi Kikuchi 41'; Kazuki Kumasawa 90'	Report		Stadium: Sagamihara Gion Stadium; Attendance: 297; Referee: Yoshimi Yamashita

14 December Match 18	Fukuoka	1–1 (a.e.t.) (2–4 p)	Hannan	Maebashi
12:00	Shinta Hojo 38'	Report	Own goal 41' (o.g.)	Stadium: Maebashi Athletic Stadium; Attendance: 73; Referee: Masahiro Horikoshi
	Penalties
	Jumpei Tanaka (penalty missed); Kaito Abe (penalty missed); Hiroto Kurakazu (penalty scored); Yu Hashimoto (penalty scored)		(penalty scored) Junta Nagai; (penalty scored) Ryota Takada; (penalty scored) Kairi Hayakawa; (penalty scored) Kazuki Yamaguchi; (penalty scored) Ryo Ozaki

14 December Match 19	Meiji	3–0	Biwako Seikei	Chofu
12:00	Fumiya Sugiura 17'; Takuto Kimura 25'; Yuta Fujihara 67'	Report		Stadium: AGF Field; Attendance: 203; Referee: Osamu Akasaka

14 December Match 20	Tsukuba	0–1	Komazawa	Urayasu
12:00		Report	Yusei Toshida 6'	Stadium: Urayasu Athletic Stadium; Attendance: 324; Referee: Keigo Sendachi

=== Semi-finals ===
18 December Match 21	Ryutsu Keizai	1–2 (a.e.t.)	Hannan	Saitama
10:30	Yuta Miyamoto 73'	Report	Taiga Matsubara 71'; Julio Shin Tsuno 95'	Stadium: NACK5 Stadium Omiya; Attendance: 680; Referee: Shingo Kuniyoshi

14 December Match 22	Meiji	0–3	Komazawa	Saitama
13:35		Report	Shunta Araki 26'; Yuya Hiyama 32'; Ko Miyazaki 79'	Stadium: NACK5 Stadium Omiya; Attendance: 654; Referee: Yoshikazu Matsuzawa

=== Final ===
25 December
13:00
Match 23

Hannan	2–3	Komazawa
Taiga Matsubara 12'; Masaya Fujiwara 48'	Report	Yusei Toshida 36'; Ko Miyazaki 58'; Shoki Shimazaki 73'

NACK5 Stadium Omiya, Saitama
Attendance: 3,235
Referee: Atsushi Kamimura

GK	22	(Japan) Kaname Murata
DF	2	(Japan) Ryota Takada
DF	4	(Japan) Shoya Nose
DF	6	(Japan) Sen Takagi
DF	24	(Japan) Kairi Hayakawa	(substituted off) 61'
MF	6	(Japan) Aoi Kudo
MF	14	(Japan) Ryoma Eguchi (c)	(substituted off) 88'
MF	18	(Japan) Ryo Ozaki	(substituted off) 90+4'
MF	31	(Japan) Masaya Fujiwara	(substituted off) 57'
FW	10	(Japan) Taiga Matsubara
FW	13	(Japan) Junta Nagai	(substituted off) 69'
Substitutes:
GK	1	(Japan) Yuya Mizutani
DF	3	(Japan) Kazuki Yamaguchi	(substituted in) 88'
MF	5	(Japan) Naoya Imamura
MF	15	(Japan) Julio Shin Tsuno	(substituted in) 61'
MF	7	(Japan) Yohei Okuyama	(substituted in) 69'
MF	9	(Japan) Kotaro Hara
MF	26	(Japan) So Oda
FW	11	(Japan) Koki Fukura	(substituted in) 90+4'
FW	20	(Japan) Shuji Ikeda	(substituted in) 57'
Manager:
(North Korea) Park Song-gi

GK	1	(Japan) Shun Matsumoto
DF	5	(Japan) Yuya Aizawa	(substituted off) 66'
DF	6	(Japan) Kazuma Inomata (c)
DF	28	(Japan) Kotaro Kobari
MF	2	(Japan) Yuya Hiyama
MF	8	(Japan) Takuro Ezaki
MF	11	(Japan) Kazuki Nakamura	(substituted off) 66'
MF	12	(Japan) Tatsuto Miyazaki	(substituted off) 90+3'
FW	7	(Japan) Shunta Araki
FW	9	(Japan) Ko Miyazaki	(substituted off) 87'
FW	10	(Japan) Yusei Toshida
Substitutes:
GK	21	(Japan) Hayato Fukazawa
DF	3	(Japan) Kaito Aizawa	(substituted in) 66'
DF	17	(Japan) Kaisei Atsushi
MF	14	(Japan) Shoki Shimazaki	(substituted in) 66'
MF	20	(Japan) Rui Nakada
MF	23	(Japan) Shinto Kojima	(substituted in) 90+3'
FW	15	(Japan) Takumi Yonetani	(substituted in) 87'
FW	27	(Japan) Toshiyasu Motoyoshi
FW	33	(Japan) Yuta Sakiyama
Manager:
(Japan) Koichi Akita

Assistant referees:
Kenta Tsukada
Koki Nakamura
Fourth official:
Taiki Mitsuka

== Top scorers ==
Rank	Player	University	Goals
1	(Japan) Yusei Toshida	Komazawa	4
2	(Japan) Masaya Fujiwara	Hannan	3
3	(Japan) Yuta Fujihara	Meiji	2
3	(Japan) Hiiro Komori	Niigata HW	2
3	(Japan) Yuta Miyamoto	Ryutsu Keizai	2
3	(Japan) Subaru Sato	Biwako Seikei	2
3	(Japan) Akito Tanahashi	Kokushikan	2
3	(Japan) Yusei Toshida	Komazawa	2
3	(Japan) Ryuki Yamaguchi	Fukuoka	2

== Awards ==
Award	Player	Grade	University
Best Player	(Japan) Shunta Araki	4th	Komazawa
Best Goalkeeper	(Japan) Shun Matsumoto	4th	Komazawa
Best Defender	(Japan) Kazuma Inomata	4th	Komazawa
Best Midfielder	(Japan) Ryoma Eguchi	4th	Hannan
Best Forward	(Japan) Ko Miyazaki	4th	Komazawa

== Joining J.League clubs on 2022 ==
Pos.	Player	Moving from	Moving to	League
GK	Yuya Aoshima	Meiji	Tochigi SC	J2
GK	Yuki Hayasaka	Ryutsu Keizai	Kawasaki Frontale	J1
GK	Taku Kamikawa	Waseda	Fukushima United	J3
GK	Shuhei Shikano	Ryutsu Keizai	Iwaki FC	J3
GK	Hayate Tanaka	Kyoto Sangyo	Tokushima Vortis	J2
GK	Haruto Usui	Ryutsu Keizai	Matsumoto Yamaga	J3
DF	Kaito Abe	Fukuoka	Roasso Kumamoto	J2
DF	Takuro Ezaki	Komazawa	Roasso Kumamoto	J2
DF	Rei Ieizumi	Ryutsu Keizai	Iwaki FC	J3
DF	Keitaro Iyori	Kwansei Gakuin	Kamatamare Sanuki	J3
DF	Ren Kato	Meiji	Tokyo Verdy	J2
DF	Tomoyuki Maekawa	Kokushikan	Azul Claro Numazu	J3
DF	Yu Miyamoto	Hosei	Tokyo Verdy	J2
DF	Renji Matsui	Hosei	Kawasaki Frontale	J1
DF	Kodai Minoda	Hosei	Shonan Bellmare	J1
DF	Kodai Mori	Biwako Seikei	Tokushima Vortis	J2
DF	Haruka Motoyama	Kwansei Gakuin	Fagiano Okayama	J2
DF	Shun Nakamura	Kokushikan	YSCC Yokohama	J3
DF	Shuto Okaniwa	Meiji	FC Tokyo	J1
DF	Asahi Sasaki	Ryutsu Keizai	Kawasaki Frontale	J1
DF	Hiroto Taniguchi	Kokushikan	Tokyo Verdy	J2
DF	Mizuki Uchida	Kokushikan	Kamatamare Sanuki	J3
DF	Kanta Usui	Kwansei Gakuin	Kamatamare Sanuki	J3
DF	Reon Yamahara	Tsukuba	Shimizu S-Pulse	J1
MF	Ryoma Eguchi	Hannan	Tegevajaro Miyazaki	J3
MF	Keigo Enomoto	Tokai Gakuen	Fujieda MYFC	J3
MF	Itto Fujita	Sendai	Roasso Kumamoto	J2
MF	Sora Igawa	Tsukuba	Hokkaido Consadole Sapporo	J1
MF	Ryoma Ito	Kokushikan	Iwaki FC	J3
MF	Tetsuyuki Inami	Meiji	Tokyo Verdy	J2
MF	Takuto Kato	Tsukuba	Kashiwa Reysol	J1
MF	Taichi Kikuchi	Ryutsu Keizai	Sagan Tosu	J1
MF	Tojiro Kubo	Chukyo	Fujieda MYFC	J3
MF	Yuma Matsumoto	Hosei	Kataller Toyama	J3
MF	Yuta Miyamoto	Ryutsu Keizai	Urawa Red Diamonds	J1
MF	Sota Nagai	Ryutsu Keizai	Iwaki FC	J3
MF	Taiyo Namazuta	Sendai	Kamatamare Sanuki	J3
MF	Ryusei Nose	Sapporo	Vanraure Hachinohe	J2
MF	Motoki Ohara	Tokai Gakuen	Ehime FC	J3
MF	Yohei Okuyama	Hannan	Iwate Grulla Morioka	J2
MF	Kyo Sato	Ryutsu Keizai	Sagan Tosu	J1
MF	Kazuyoshi Shimabuku	Niigata HW	Albirex Niigata	J2
MF	Taishi Semba	Ryutsu Keizai	Sanfrecce Hiroshima	J1
MF	Fumiya Sugiura	Meiji	Mito HollyHock	J2
MF	Ryo Tabei	Hosei	Yokohama FC	J2
MF	Yu Tabei	Waseda	Thespa Gunma	J2
MF	Kohei Takahashi	Sapporo	Nagano Parceiro	J3
MF	Jumpei Tanaka	Fukuoka	Tegevajaro Miyazaki	J3
MF	Yudai Tanaka	Waseda	Fagiano Okayama	J2
MF	Ryohei Wakizaka	Niigata HW	YSCC Yokohama	J3
MF	Eisuke Watanabe	Kwansei Gakuin	Kagoshima United	J3
MF	Akira Yamauchi	Tokai Gakuen	FC Gifu	J3
MF	Kaito Yasui	Ryutsu Keizai	Urawa Red Diamonds	J1
MF	Shosaku Yasumitsu	Hosei	Kataller Toyama	J3
FW	Shunta Araki	Komazawa	Sagan Tosu	J1
FW	Ryo Arita	Kokushikan	Iwaki FC	J3
FW	Yuta Fujihara	Meiji	Sagan Tosu	J1
FW	Mikito Fukuda	Tokai Gakuen	Kagoshima United	J3
FW	Masato Igarashi	Kanoya	Tochigi SC	J2
FW	Riku Iijima	Hosei	Ventforet Kofu	J2
FW	Yukihito Kajiya	Kokushikan	Sagan Tosu	J1
FW	Takumi Kato	Waseda	Shimizu S-Pulse	J1
FW	Yusuke Kikui	Ryutsu Keizai	Matsumoto Yamaga	J3
FW	Makoto Mitsuta	Ryutsu Keizai	Sanfrecce Hiroshima	J1
FW	Ko Miyazaki	Komazawa	Tochigi SC	J2
FW	Kaito Mori	Tsukuba	Kashiwa Reysol	J1
FW	Takato Nakai	Hosei	Fujieda MYFC	J3
FW	Ryo Nemoto	Kanoya	Shonan Bellmare	J1
FW	Daiki Sato	Hosei	Machida Zelvia	J2
FW	Kosuke Takebe	Sendai	Vanraure Hachinohe	J2
FW	Kazuki Tanaka	Hosei	Kyoto Sanga	J1
FW	Yusei Toshida	Komazawa	Roasso Kumamoto	J2
FW	Shinya Utsumoto	Miyazaki Sangyo-keiei	Oita Trinita	J2
FW	Hiroto Yamami	Kwansei Gakuin	Gamba Osaka	J1

== See also ==
- 2021 All Japan High School Soccer Tournament
