= 2022 All Japan University Football Championship =

Tournament details
- Country: Japan
- Dates: 8 December 2022 – 1 January 2023
- Teams: 24

Final positions
- Champions: Toin Yokohama (1st title)
- Runners-up: Niigata HW

Tournament statistics
- Matches played: 23
- Goals scored: 79 (3.43 per match)
- Attendance: 19,302 (839 per match)
- Top goal scorer(s): Kim Hyun-woo; Shota Tanaka (4 goals)

Awards
- Best player: Shin Yamada (Toin Yokohama)

The 2022 All Japan University Football Championship (第71回 全日本大学サッカー選手権大会; All Japan 71st University Football Championship) was the 71st edition of the referred annually contested cup for universities across Japan. As usual, the tournament was contested by 24 universities on a knockout-stage format. Komazawa were the current champions, winning 3–2 past Hannan on the 2021 championship. However, as they didn't qualify for this edition, the university was unable to defend their title. Toin Yokohama took advantage of it, winning the championship by a 3–2 win after a last-minute goal against the Niigata University of Health and Welfare. This win was their first in this tournament.

== Calendar ==
| Round | Date | Matches | Clubs |
|---|---|---|---|
| First round | 8 December 2022 | 8 | 16 → 8 |
| Round of 16 | 11 December 2022 | 8 | 16 (8+8) → 8 |
| Quarter-finals | 17–18 December 2022 | 4 | 8 → 4 |
| Semi-finals | 25 December 2022 | 2 | 4 → 2 |
| Final | 1 January 2023 | 1 | 2 → 1 |

== Participating clubs ==
In parentheses: Each university's performance at the regional qualifying series.

| Region | RP | University | Apps | Located on |
|---|---|---|---|---|
| Hokkaido | 1st | Hokkaido University of Education Iwamizawa | 10th | Iwamizawa |
| Tohoku | 1st | Sendai University | 38th | Miyagi |
| Tohoku | 2nd | Hachinohe Gakuin University | 2nd | Aomori |
| Hokushin'etsu | 1st | Niigata University of Health and Welfare | 8th | Niigata |
| Hokushin'etsu | 2nd | Hokuriku University | 5th | Ishikawa |
| Kanto | 1st | Meiji University | 21st | Tokyo |
| Kanto | 2nd | Tokyo International University | 2nd | Saitama |
| Kanto | 3rd | University of Tsukuba | 40th | Ibaraki |
| Kanto | 4th | Toin University of Yokohama | 2nd | Kanagawa |
| Kanto | 5th | Hosei University | 33rd | Tokyo |
| Kanto | 6th | Kokushikan University | 28th | Tokyo |
| Tokai | 1st | Shizuoka Sangyo University | 14th | Shizuoka |
| Tokai | 2nd | Tokoha University | 13th | Shizuoka |
| Tokai | 3rd | Chukyo University | 42nd | Aichi |
| Kansai | 1st | Kwansei Gakuin University | 24th | Hyogo |
| Kansai | 2nd | Biwako Seikei Sport College | 6th | Shiga |
| Kansai | 3rd | Hannan University | 21st | Osaka |
| Kansai | 4th | Kansai University | 25th | Osaka |
| Chugoku | 1st | International Pacific University | 9th | Okayama |
| Chugoku | 2nd | Hiroshima University | 12nd | Hiroshima |
| Shikoku | 1st | Takamatsu University | 3rd | Kagawa |
| Kyushu | 1st | Fukuoka University | 45th | Fukuoka |
| Kyushu | 2nd | National Institute of Fitness and Sports in Kanoya | 25th | Kagoshima |
| Kyushu | 3rd | Kyushu Sangyo University | 19th | Fukuoka |

== Schedule ==
The participating teams and match-ups were disclosed on 22 November 2022.

=== First round ===
| 8 December 2022 Match 1 | Kyushu Sangyo | 1–4 | Sendai | Saitama |
| 11:00 | Raito Kohama 7' | Report | Sho Sasaki 14'; Shota Hata 64'; Kazuma Tomikuda 86'; Manato Honda 88' | Stadium: NHK Spring Mitsuzawa Football Stadium; Attendance: 164 |

| 8 December 2022 Match 2 | Hannan | 1–0 (a.e.t.) | Hiroshima | Chofu |
| 11:00 | Seito Teraoka 105+1' | Report | | Stadium: AGF Field; Attendance: 194 |

| 8 December 2022 Match 3 | Fukuoka | 2–2 (a.e.t.) (5–6 p) | Chukyo | Narashino |
| 11:00 | Masato Shigemi 16'; Kazuma Nagata 54' | Report | Kanta Nagata 13'; Koya Fujii 60' | Stadium: Frontier Soccer Field; Attendance: 258 |
| | Penalties |
| | Yu Hashimoto (penalty scored); Masato Shigemi (penalty scored); Yamato Okada (penalty scored); Ryuta Sakakihara (penalty missed); Shun Isotani (penalty scored); Reiju Tsuruno (penalty missed); Shun Osaki (penalty scored); Yuya Uchida (penalty missed) | | Koki Kawachi (penalty scored); Sota Fukazawa (penalty scored); Futa Tada (penalty missed); Shuto Udo (penalty scored); Seiya Okamoto (penalty scored); Hiroshi Muto (penalty missed); Koya Fujii (penalty scored); Kanata Yakabi (penalty scored) |

| 8 December 2022 Match 4 | Niigata HW | 3–1 | Hachinohe Gakuin | Urayasu |
| 11:00 | Shota Tanaka 32'; Kanta Sakagishi 60'; Own goal 83' (o.g.) | Report | Yuto Hotta 11' | Stadium: Urayasu Athletic Stadium; Attendance: 118 |

| 8 December 2022 Match 5 | Hokuriku | 2–3 | Takamatsu | Ryugasaki |
| 11:00 | Junya Nakamura 24'; Shogo Konno 81' | Report | Yu Miyoshi 7', 65'; Own goal 80' (o.g.) | Stadium: Ryutsu Keizai University Ryugasaki Field; Attendance: 81 |

| 8 December 2022 Match 6 | Hokkaido Iwamizawa | 2–1 | International Pacific | Ryugasaki |
| 14:00 | Hiroya Kaneda 20'; Shuhei Nawata 89' | Report | Kaisei Terao 66' | Stadium: Ryutsu Keizai University Ryugasaki Field; Attendance: 85 |

| 8 December 2022 Match 7 | Kanoya | 1–3 | Shizuoka Sangyo | Narashino |
| 14:00 | Hayato Katayama 61' | Report | Taiki Uchiyamada 6'; Kota Hattori 15'; Masaya Kato 44' | Stadium: Frontier Soccer Field; Attendance: 221 |

| 8 December 2022 Match 8 | Kansai | 4–4 (a.e.t.) (2–4 p) | Tokoha | Saitama |
| 14:00 | Yuta Fukazawa 11'; Yusuke Matsuo 30'; Koki Uda 90+6'; Masaki Nishimura 94' | Report | Ukyo Takase 17'; Yui Takano 35'; Kim Hyun-woo 55'; Kazuma Shimizu 114' | Stadium: NHK Spring Mitsuzawa Football Stadium; Attendance: 264 |
| | Penalties |
| | Yuta Fukazawa (penalty scored); Masaki Nishimura (penalty scored); Masato Kimura (penalty missed); Koki Uda (penalty missed) | | Hayato Kato (penalty scored); Kazuki Matsuda (penalty scored); Kazuma Shimizu (penalty missed); Tsubasa Ito (penalty scored); Yui Takano (penalty scored) |

=== Round of 16 ===
| 11 December 2022 Match 9 | Meiji | 1–2 | Sendai | Kita |
| 11:00 | Ryunosuke Ota 57' | Report | Sho Sasaki 31'; Shota Hata 120+1' | Stadium: Ajinomoto Field Nishigaoka; Attendance: 507 |

| 11 December 2022 Match 10 | Hannan | 0–1 | Kokushikan | Chofu |
| 14:00 | | Report | Makoto Furukawa 68' | Stadium: AGF Field; Attendance: 352 |

| 11 December 2022 Match 11 | Chukyo | 2–2 (a.e.t.) (5–4 p) | Tsukuba | Chofu |
| 11:00 | Kanta Nagata 20'; Shuto Udo 49' | Report | Hagumi Wada 65'; Takato Takeuchi 81' | Stadium: AGF Field; Attendance: 280 |
| | Penalties |
| | Koshiro Chibana (penalty scored); Takuro Kodama (penalty scored); Shuto Udo (penalty scored); Taisei Kuwata (penalty scored); Seiya Okamoto (penalty scored) | | Kakeru Yamauchi (penalty scored); Takato Takeuchi (penalty scored); Koshiro Sumi (penalty scored); Keita Fukui (penalty scored); Yumenosuke Shoji (penalty missed) |

| 11 December 2022 Match 12 | Biwako Seikei | 2–3 | Niigata HW | Urayasu |
| 11:00 | Toya Izumi 31'; Shuma Takami 33' | Report | Hiiro Komori 26', 76'; Shota Tanaka 63' | Stadium: Urayasu Athletic Stadium; Attendance: 160 |

| 11 December 2022 Match 13 | Tokyo International | 3–0 | Takamatsu | Ryugasaki |
| 11:00 | Ryusei Muraki 62', 85'; Shu Morooka 73' | Report | | Stadium: Ryutsu Keizai University Ryugasaki Field; Attendance: 198 |

| 11 December 2022 Match 14 | Hokkaido Iwamizawa | 1–3 | Toin Yokohama | Ryugasaki |
| 14:00 | Fubuki Ishiyama 23' | Report | Shin Yamada 45+1'; Shuntaro Ide 87', 90+3' | Stadium: Ryutsu Keizai University Ryugasaki Field; Attendance: 193 |

| 11 December 2022 Match 15 | Shizuoka Sangyo | 1–2 | Kwansei Gakuin | Kita |
| 14:00 | Shunsuke Baba 84' | Report | Goki Yamada 33'; Yudai Kimura 87' | Stadium: Ajinomoto Field Nishigaoka; Attendance: 590 |

| 11 December 2022 Match 16 | Hosei | 0–5 | Tokoha | Yokohama |
| 11:00 | | Report | Kim Hyun-woo 49', 52', 90+1'; Chihiro Konagaya 65'; Ukyo Takase 76' | Stadium: Hodogaya Park Soccer Field; Attendance: 247 |

=== Quarter-finals ===
| 17 December 2022 Match 17 | Sendai | 0–3 | Kokushikan | Chofu |
| 11:00 | | Report | Akito Tanahashi 26'; Kosei Makiyama 38'; Kenshin Yuba 53' | Stadium: AGF Field; Attendance: 525; Referee: Takahito Seta |

| 18 December 2022 Match 18 | Chukyo | 1–1 (a.e.t.) (4–5 p) | Niigata HW | Sagamihara |
| 11:00 | Koya Fujii 17' | Report | Dylan Nobiraki 90+1' | Stadium: Sagamihara Gion Stadium; Attendance: 376; Referee: Yoshikazu Matsuzawa |
| | Penalties |
| | Koki Kawachi (penalty scored); Koshiro Chibana (penalty scored); Taisei Kuwata (penalty missed); Koya Fujii (penalty scored); Seiya Okamoto (penalty scored) | | Hiiro Komori (penalty scored); George Onaiwu (penalty scored); Seiya Nikaido (penalty scored); Shingo Morita (penalty scored); Dylan Nobiraki (penalty scored) |

| 18 December 2022 Match 19 | Tokyo International | 0–2 | Toin Yokohama | Ryugasaki |
| 11:00 | | Report | Kazuki Yoshida 42'; Shin Yamada 58' | Stadium: Ryutsu Keizai University Ryugasaki Field; Attendance: 370; Referee: Kenshi Uda |

| 18 December 2022 Match 20 | Kwansei Gakuin | 1–0 | Tokoha | Sagamihara |
| 14:00 | Goki Yamada 9' | Report | | Stadium: Sagamihara Gion Stadium; Attendance: 381; Referee: Tatsuya Sakai |

=== Semi-finals ===
| 25 December 2022 Match 21 | Kokushikan | 0–1 | Niigata HW | Utsunomiya |
| 11:00 | | Report | Shota Tanaka 12' | Stadium: Kanseki Stadium Tochigi; Attendance: 610; Referee: Genki Tawara |

| 25 December 2022 Match 22 | Toin Yokohama | 2–1 | Kwansei Gakuin | Utsunomiya |
| 14:00 | Hinata Yamauchi 45+1'; Keita Shirawachi 120+1' | Report | Yudai Kimura 90' | Stadium: Kanseki Stadium Tochigi; Attendance: 647; Referee: Shingo Kuniyoshi |

=== Final ===
1 January 2023
14:00
Match 23

| Niigata HW | 2–3 | Toin Yokohama |
|---|---|---|
| Shota Tanaka 23'; Seiya Nikaido 31' | Report | Shimon Teranuma 26'; Keisuke Kasai 76'; Shin Yamada 90+3' |

Japan National Stadium, Shinjuku
Attendance: 12,481
Referee: Shu Kawamata

| GK | 12 | (Japan) Ryo Momoi |
| DF | 2 | (Japan) Shingo Morita |
| DF | 4 | (Japan) Ryusei Akimoto |
| DF | 5 | (Japan) Seiya Nikaido (c) |
| DF | 13 | (Japan) Yusei Kanda |
| MF | 6 | (Japan) Dylan Nobiraki |
| MF | 8 | (Japan) Kosei Numata | (substituted off) 72' |
| MF | 11 | (Japan) George Onaiwu |
| MF | 24 | (Japan) Kanta Sakagishi |
| FW | 9 | (Japan) Shota Tanaka | (substituted off) 78' |
| FW | 10 | (Japan) Hiiro Komori |
Substitutes:
| GK | 1 | (Japan) Rui Sammonji |
| DF | 25 | (Japan) Manato Komata |
| MF | 17 | (Japan) Eiki Mori |
| MF | 18 | (Japan) Yusaku Hasegawa | (substituted on) 72' |
| MF | 23 | (Japan) Satoru Hashizume |
| MF | 26 | (Japan) Rikuto Koike |
| MF | 27 | (Japan) Tenmu Matsumoto |
| FW | 16 | (Japan) Koki Matsuya | (substituted on) 78' |
| FW | 22 | (Japan) Ryo Onoda |
Manager:
(Japan) Hirokazu Sakuma

| GK | 1 | (Japan) Kai Chidi Kitamura (c) |
| DF | 2 | (Japan) Ippei Hada |
| DF | 3 | (Japan) Shuto Nakano |
| DF | 4 | (Japan) Kazuki Yoshida |
| DF | 13 | (Japan) Daiki Tanaka |
| MF | 5 | (Japan) Shoma Takayoshi |
| MF | 8 | (Japan) Hinata Yamauchi |
| MF | 10 | (Japan) Hayata Mizuno | (substituted off) 89' |
| MF | 22 | (Japan) Shintaro Ide | (substituted off) 72' |
| FW | 9 | (Japan) Shin Yamada |
| FW | 11 | (Japan) Shimon Teranuma |
Substitutes:
| GK | 21 | (Japan) Tsubasa Nishizawa |
| DF | 24 | (Japan) Sena Igarashi |
| DF | 30 | (Japan) Atsushi Nabeta |
| MF | 7 | (Japan) Keisuke Sakai | (substituted on) 72' |
| MF | 15 | (Japan) Yosei Ozeki |
| MF | 25 | (Japan) Koki Kanda | (substituted on) 89' |
| MF | 29 | (Japan) Koki Sasanuma |
| FW | 6 | (Japan) Kaito Satori |
| FW | 14 | (Japan) Keita Shirawachi |
Manager:
(Japan) Toru Yasutake

Assistant referees:
Takeshi Asada
Shun Tsukui
Fourth official:
Kurisu Oshimizu

== Top scorers ==
| Rank | Player | University | Goals |
|---|---|---|---|
| 1 | (South Korea) Kim Hyun-woo | Tokoha | 4 |
| 1 | (Japan) Shota Tanaka | Niigata HW | 4 |
| 3 | (Japan) Shin Yamada | Toin Yokohama | 3 |
| 4 | (Japan) Koya Fujii | Chukyo | 2 |
| 4 | (Japan) Shota Hata | Sendai | 2 |
| 4 | (Japan) Shuntaro Ide | Toin Yokohama | 2 |
| 4 | (Japan) Yudai Kimura | Kwansei Gakuin | 2 |
| 4 | (Japan) Hiiro Komori | Niigata HW | 2 |
| 4 | (Japan) Yu Miyoshi | Takamatsu | 2 |
| 4 | (Japan) Ryusei Muraki | Tokyo International | 2 |
| 4 | (Japan) Kanta Nagata | Chukyo | 2 |
| 4 | (Japan) Sho Sasaki | Sendai | 2 |
| 4 | (Japan) Ukyo Takase | Tokoha | 2 |

== Awards ==
| Award | Player | Grade | University |
|---|---|---|---|
| Best Player | (Japan) Shin Yamada | 4th | Toin Yokohama |
| Best Goalkeeper | (Japan) Ryo Momoi | 2nd | Niigata HW |
| Best Defender | (Japan) Shuto Nakano | 4th | Toin Yokohama |
| Best Midfielder | (Japan) George Onaiwu | 4th | Niigata HW |
| Best Forward | (Japan) Shimon Teranuma | 4th | Toin Yokohama |

== Joining J.League clubs on 2023 ==
| Pos. | Player | Moving from | Moving to | League |
|---|---|---|---|---|
| GK | Masaki Endo | Meiji | Yokohama FC | J1 |
| GK | Shotaro Hayashi | Tokyo International | FC Gifu | J3 |
| GK | Masahiro Iida | Kokushikan | Tokyo Verdy | J2 |
| GK | Kai Chidi Kitamura | Toin Yokohama | Fujieda MYFC | J2 |
| GK | Issei Kondo | Hosei | JEF United Chiba | J2 |
| DF | Shinnosuke Fukuda | Meiji | Kyoto Sanga | J1 |
| DF | Ippei Hada | Toin Yokohama | FC Gifu | J3 |
| DF | Kodai Hagino | Hosei | FC Gifu | J3 |
| DF | Shuhei Hayami | Tokoha | Iwaki FC | J2 |
| DF | Kotaro Hayashi | Meiji | Yokohama FC | J1 |
| DF | Takahiro Horie | Hosei | Kagoshima United | J3 |
| DF | Yusuke Matsuo | Kansai | Oita Trinita | J2 |
| DF | Yuto Minakuchi | Chukyo | SC Sagamihara | J3 |
| DF | Kaito Miyazaki | Kanoya | Roasso Kumamoto | J2 |
| DF | Yuri Mori | Tsukuba | FC Ryukyu | J3 |
| DF | Atsushi Nabeta | Toin Yokohama | Kataller Toyama | J3 |
| DF | Shuto Nakano | Toin Yokohama | Sanfrecce Hiroshima | J1 |
| DF | Seiya Nikaido | Niigata HW | YSCC Yokohama | J3 |
| DF | Sukai Numata | Niigata HW | YSCC Yokohama | J3 |
| DF | Taketo Ochiai | Hosei | Shimizu S-Pulse | J2 |
| DF | Yusuke Oishi | Kokushikan | Giravanz Kitakyushu | J3 |
| DF | Hiroto Okoshi | Toin Yokohama | YSCC Yokohama | J3 |
| DF | Haruki Oshima | Chukyo | YSCC Yokohama | J3 |
| DF | Fuga Sakurai | Meiji | Zweigen Kanazawa | J2 |
| DF | Shota Shimogami | Kyushu Sangyo | Iwate Grulla Morioka | J3 |
| DF | Haruki Shirai | Hosei | V-Varen Nagasaki | J2 |
| DF | Ryota Takada | Hannan | Blaublitz Akita | J2 |
| DF | Shuya Takashima | Hosei | Tochigi SC | J2 |
| DF | Yuki Yamada | Biwako Seikei | FC Osaka | J3 |
| DF | Kotaro Yamahara | Tokyo International | Fujieda MYFC | J2 |
| DF | Shusei Yamauchi | Kwansei Gakuin | FC Ryukyu | J3 |
| MF | Kento Awano | Sendai | Fukushima United | J3 |
| MF | Yuta Fukazawa | Kansai | Ehime FC | J3 |
| MF | Sho Fuseya | Kokushikan | Machida Zelvia | J2 |
| MF | Sho Iwamoto | Tsukuba | FC Ryukyu | J3 |
| MF | Toya Izumi | Biwako Seikei | Vissel Kobe | J1 |
| MF | Takuto Kimura | Meiji | Yokohama F. Marinos | J1 |
| MF | Daiki Kusunoki | Toin Yokohama | Tokyo Verdy | J2 |
| MF | Aoi Kudo | Hannan | Vegalta Sendai | J2 |
| MF | Kosei Makiyama | Kokushikan | SC Sagamihara | J3 |
| MF | Koki Matsubara | Meiji | Iwate Grulla Morioka | J3 |
| MF | Riku Ochiai | Tokyo International | Kashiwa Reysol | J1 |
| MF | Yusei Otake | Toin Yokohama | YSCC Yokohama | J3 |
| MF | Yosei Ozeki | Toin Yokohama | Fujieda MYFC | J2 |
| MF | George Onaiwu | Niigata HW | Vegalta Sendai | J2 |
| MF | Rikuto Sano | Hosei | SC Sagamihara | J3 |
| MF | Naoki Takahashi | Kokushikan | Kamatamare Sanuki | J3 |
| MF | Shoma Takayoshi | Toin Yokohama | Giravanz Kitakyushu | J3 |
| MF | Atsuki Tojo | Kokushikan | Gainare Tottori | J3 |
| MF | Yuto Tsunashima | Kokushikan | Tokyo Verdy | J2 |
| MF | Ryu Wakabayashi | Hosei | SC Sagamihara | J3 |
| MF | Takumi Yamaguchi | Kanoya | Kagoshima United | J3 |
| FW | Yudai Kimura | Kwansei Gakuin | Kyoto Sanga | J1 |
| FW | Hiiro Komori | Niigata HW | JEF United Chiba | J2 |
| FW | Hayata Mizuno | Toin Yokohama | Ventforet Kofu | J2 |
| FW | Shu Morooka | Tokyo International | Kashima Antlers | J1 |
| FW | Kazuma Nagata | Fukuoka | Tegevajaro Miyazaki | J3 |
| FW | Shun Osaki | Fukuoka | Roasso Kumamoto | J2 |
| FW | Kosuke Sagawa | Tokyo International | Tokyo Verdy | J2 |
| FW | Kaito Satori | Toin Yokohama | SC Sagamihara | J3 |
| FW | Akito Tanahashi | Kokushikan | Tokushima Vortis | J2 |
| FW | Shimon Teranuma | Toin Yokohama | Mito HollyHock | J2 |
| FW | Reiju Tsuruno | Fukuoka | Avispa Fukuoka | J1 |
| FW | Hagumi Wada | Tsukuba | Azul Claro Numazu | J3 |
| FW | Goki Yamada | Kwansei Gakuin | Tokyo Verdy | J2 |
| FW | Shin Yamada | Toin Yokohama | Kawasaki Frontale | J1 |

== See also ==
- 2022 All Japan Women's University Football Championship
- 2022 All Japan High School Soccer Tournament
- 2022 All Japan High School Women's Soccer Tournament
