= 2017 All Japan High School Soccer Tournament =

Tournament details
- Country: Japan
- Dates: 30 December 2017 – 8 January 2018
- Teams: 48

Final positions
- Champions: Maebashi Ikuei High School (1st title)
- Runner-up: RKU Kashiwa High School

Tournament statistics
- Top goal scorer(s): Riku Iijima (Maebashi Ikuei, 7 goals)

The 2017 All Japan High School Soccer Tournament (All Japan JFA 96th High School Soccer Tournament (Japanese: 第96回全国高等学校サッカー選手権大会) marked the 96th edition of the referred annually contested cup for High Schools over Japan.

== Calendar ==
Round	Date	Matches	Teams
First round	30–31 December 2017	16	32 (32) → 16
Second round	2 January 2018	16	32 (16+16) → 16
Third round	3 January 2018	8	16 → 8
Quarter-finals	5 January 2018	4	8 → 4
Semi-finals	6 January 2018	2	4 → 2
Final	8 January 2018	1	2 → 1

== Venues ==
The tournament was played in four prefectures and nine stadiums, with six (two for each prefecture) located in Chiba, Kanagawa, and Tokyo Prefectures, and three located in Saitama. They are:

- Tokyo – Ajinomoto Field Nishigaoka, and Komazawa Olympic Park Stadium
- Saitama – Saitama Stadium 2002, Urawa Komaba Stadium and NACK5 Stadium Omiya
- Kanagawa – NHK Spring Mitsuzawa Football Stadium and Kawasaki Todoroki Stadium
- Chiba – Fukuda Denshi Arena and ZA Oripri Stadium

== Participating clubs ==
In parentheses: the amount of times each team qualified for the All Japan High School Tournament (appearance in the 2017 edition included)

Hokkaido: Asahikawa Jitsugyo High School (6); Aomori: Aomori Yamada High School (23); Iwate: Tono High School (27); Akita: Akita Shogyo High School (43); Miyagi: Sendai Ikuei Gakuen High School (32); Yamagata: Haguro High School (6); Fukushima: Shoshi High School (9); Ibaraki: Meishu Hitachi High School (2); Tochigi: Yaita Chuo High School (8); Gunma: Maebashi Ikuei High School (21); Saitama: Shohei High School (2); Chiba: Ryutsu Keizai Univ. Kashiwa High School (5); Tokyo A: Kanto Daiichi High School (2); Tokyo B: Jissen Gakuen High School (3); Kanagawa: Toin Gakuen High School (9); Niigata: Nihon Bunri High School (1); Nagano: Ueda Nishi High School (2); Yamanashi: Yamanashi Gakuin High School (6); Toyama: Toyama Daiichi High School (28); Ishikawa: Seiryō High School (27); Fukui: Hokuriku High School (5); Gifu: Teikyo Univ. Kani High School (5); Shizuoka: Shimizu Sakuragaoka High School (1); Aichi: Chukyo Univ. Chukyo High School (16)	Mie: Mie High School (1); Shiga: Kusatsu Higashi High School (9); Kyoto: Kyoto Tachibana High School (7); Osaka: Osaka Toin High School (2); Hyōgo: Takigawa Daini High School (20); Nara: Ichijo High School (8); Wakayama: Hatsushiba Hashimoto High School (34); Tottori: Yonago Kita High School (13); Shimane: Rissho Univ. Shonan High School (16); Okayama: Sakuyo High School (23); Hiroshima: Hiroshima Minami High School (14); Yamaguchi: Takagawa Gakuen High School (24); Tokushima: Tokushima Kita High School (1); Kagawa: Takamatsu Shogyo High School (23); Ehime: Matsuyama Kogyo High School (6); Kōchi: Kochi Nishi High School (1); Fukuoka: Higashi Fukuoka High School (19); Saga: Saga Higashi High School (10); Nagasaki: Nagasaki IAS High School (5); Kumamoto: Tokai Univ. Kumamoto Seisho High School (1); Ōita: Oita Nishi High School (1); Miyazaki: Nissho Gakuen High School (13); Kagoshima: Kamimura Gakuen High School (5); Okinawa: Ginowan High School (3)

== Schedule ==
=== First round ===
31 December 2017 1	Chukyo	0–3	Nagasaki IAS	Chiba
14:10		Report	Shunji Shimanaka 17'; Takayuki Ogawa 63'; Mizuki Ando 80+3'	Stadium: Fukuda Denshi Arena

31 December 2017 1	Shimizu Sakuragaoka	1–1 (3–5 p)	Takagawa Gakuen	Chiba
12:05	Yuya Matsushita 78'	Report	Renya Yamamoto 75'	Stadium: Fukuda Denshi Arena

31 December 2017 1	Hokuriku	1–3	Nissho Gakuen	Kita
12:05	Yusuke Sugimura 23'	Report	Sota Sato 11', 21'; Yosuke Suzuki 80'	Stadium: Ajinomoto Field Nishigaoka

30 December 2017 1	Kanto Daiichi	0–2	Saga Higashi	Setagaya
14:05		Report	Tomoki Nakazato 46'; Yamato Towatari 64'	Stadium: Komazawa Olympic Park Stadium

31 December 2017 1	Nihon Bunri	2–0	Rissho Shonan	Saitama
14:10	Rei Kusumi 14', 66'	Report		Stadium: Urawa Komaba Stadium

31 December 2017 1	Asahikawa Jitsugyo	4–2	Ginowan	Saitama
12:05	Ayumu Nishimura 7'; Masayoshi Endo 37', 56'; Riku Yamauchi 49'	Report	Ryu Yonamine 28'; Yuto Tomita 75'	Stadium: Urawa Komaba Stadium

31 December 2017 1	Akita Shogyo	0–1	Kamimura Gakuen	Saitama
14:10		Report	Daigo Takahashi 38'	Stadium: NACK5 Stadium Omiya

31 December 2017 1	Shohei	1–1 (4–3 p)	Hiroshima Minami	Saitama
12:05	Kazuaki Saso 19'	Report	Taichi Tsutsumi 34'	Stadium: NACK5 Stadium Omiya

31 December 2017 1	Meishu Hitachi	3–0	Kochi Nishi	Ichihara
12:05	Keita Arai 4'; Hayato Iri 52'; Koki Hashimoto 73'	Report		Stadium: ZA Oripri Stadium

31 December 2017 1	Seiryo	1–0	Matsuyama Kogyo	Ichihara
14:10	Yudai Nishibe 52'	Report		Stadium: ZA Oripri Stadium

31 December 2017 1	Jissen Gakuen	0–2	Takigawa Daini	Setagaya
12:05		Report	Jotaro Inada 12'; Kazuki Fukushima 18'	Stadium: Komazawa Olympic Park Stadium

31 December 2017 1	Teikyo Kani	3–0	Tokushima Kita	Setagaya
14:10	Juri Sakanashi 17'; Tojiro Kubo 76'; Daichi Omori 79'	Report		Stadium: Komazawa Olympic Park Stadium

31 December 2017 1	Yamanashi Gakuin	1–2	Yonago Kita	Yokohama
12:05	Takumi Kato 23'	Report	Nichika Sakata 31'; Rui Hamada 47'	Stadium: NHK Spring Mitsuzawa Football Stadium

31 December 2017 1	Sendai Ikuei	3–2	Takamatsu Shogyo	Yokohama
14:10	Kazuki Sato 5', 40+1', 80+3'	Report	Akito Nakano 51'; Kazuma Yokochi 58'	Stadium: NHK Spring Mitsuzawa Football Stadium

31 December 2017 1	Toyama Daiichi	1–0	Tokai Kumamoto Seisho	Kawasaki
14:10	Kiyoshiro Tsuboi 26'	Report		Stadium: Kawasaki Todoroki Stadium

31 December 2017 1	Shoshi	0–3	Higashi Fukuoka	Kawasaki
12:05		Report	Naoya Okino 33'; Yuya Fukuda 74'; Tomoki Kihashi 80+4'	Stadium: Kawasaki Todoroki Stadium

=== Second round ===
2 January 2018 2	Aomori Yamada	5–0	Kusatsu Higashi	Chiba
14:10	Yuta Goke 37', 48'; Shunta Nakamura 51', 60'; Kenya Takagawa 80+3'	Report		Stadium: Fukuda Denshi Arena

2 January 2018 2	Nagasaki IAS	2–1	Takagawa Gakuen	Ichihara
14:10	Mizuki Ando 32'; Renta Iwamoto 35'	Report	Yusei Toshida 66'	Stadium: ZA Oripri Stadium

2 January 2018 2	Nissho Gakuen	4–1	Saga Higashi	Kita
12:05	Sota Sato 9'; Atsushi Kawahara 19', 67'; Aoi Kizu 80+2'	Report	Tomoki Nakazato 5'	Stadium: Ajinomoto Field Nishigaoka

2 January 2018 2	RKU Kashiwa	3–0	Oita Nishi	Chiba
12:05	Taichi Kikuchi 3', 44'; Ren Kato 53'	Report		Stadium: Fukuda Denshi Arena

2 January 2018 2	Tono	1–2	Sakuyo	Saitama
14:10	Yusuke Takahara 69'	Report	Takumi Nishiyama 26'; Juta Nakanishi 38'	Stadium: Urawa Komaba Stadium

2 January 2018 2	Nihon Bunri	2–0	Asahikawa Jitsugyo	Saitama
14:10	Rei Kusumi 14'; Raiku Kameyama 28'	Report		Stadium: Urawa Komaba Stadium

2 January 2018 2	Kamimura Gakuen	1–0	Shohei	Saitama
12:05	Daigo Takahashi 9'	Report		Stadium: NACK5 Stadium Omiya

2 January 2018 2	Mie	2–3	Yaita Chuo	Saitama
12:05	Yudai Okuda 25'; Shion Minamide 72'	Report	Jukiya Hisanaga 2'; Tetsuyuki Inami 28'; Haruki Shirai 65'	Stadium: NACK5 Stadium Omiya

2 January 2018 2	Osaka Toin	6–0	Haguro	Kita
14:10	Yota Imaoka 3', 44'; ? 31' (o.g.); Yusuke Kikui 39', 66'; Kento Nishiya 40'	Report		Stadium: Ajinomoto Field Nishigaoka

2 January 2018 2	Meishu Hitachi	1–0	Seiryo	Ichihara
12:05	Yuta Nihei 2'	Report		Stadium: ZA Oripri Stadium

2 January 2018 2	Takigawa Daini	2–3	Teikyo Kani	Setagaya
12:05	Naoto Uede 10'; Kazuma Hirota 17'	Report	Ryosuke Nishio 21'; Satsuki Omori 45', 71'	Stadium: Komazawa Olympic Park Stadium

2 January 2018 2	Ueda Nishi	1–0	Kyoto Tachibana	Setagaya
14:10	Ryusei Okubo 63'	Report		Stadium: Komazawa Olympic Park Stadium

2 January 2018 2	Toin Gakuen	2–2 (2–3 p)	Ichijo	Kawasaki
12:05	Shosuke Moriyama 13', 71'	Report	Kazutaka Nakai 43'; Yasuto Sosaka 80+4'	Stadium: Kawasaki Todoroki Stadium
	Penalties
	Tsuyoshi Yoshida (penalty missed); Koyo Shishido (penalty missed); Shosuke Moriyama (penalty scored); Tak Nelson (penalty missed); Daiki Kaneko (penalty scored)		(penalty missed) Reita Takeshima; (penalty scored) Takumu Yamahara; (penalty missed) Masaru Horinouchi; (penalty scored) Mizuki Okui; (penalty scored) Kota Kawasaki

2 January 2018 2	Yonago Kita	1–0	Sendai Ikuei	Yokohama
12:05	Taishi Joichi 3'	Report		Stadium: NHK Spring Mitsuzawa Football Stadium

2 January 2018 2	Toyama Daiichi	1–0	Higashi Fukuoka	Kawasaki
14:10	Shogo Otake 80+3'	Report		Stadium: Kawasaki Todoroki Stadium

2 January 2018 2	Hatsushiba Hashimoto	0–5	Maebashi Ikuei	Yokohama
14:10		Report	Riku Iijima 16', 44', 54', 68'; Ko Miyazaki 75'	Stadium: NHK Spring Mitsuzawa Football Stadium

=== Round of 16 ===
3 January 2018 3	Aomori Yamada	0–1	Nagasaki IAS	Chiba
14:10		Report	Mizuki Ando 25'	Stadium: Fukuda Denshi Arena

3 January 2018 3	Nissho Gakuen	0–1	RKU Kashiwa	Chiba
12:05		Report	Ren Kato 67'	Stadium: Fukuda Denshi Arena

3 January 2018 3	Sakuyo	1–1 (6–7 p)	Nihon Bunri	Saitama
14:10	Shoya Kurose 32'	Report	Raiku Kameyama 26'	Stadium: Urawa Komaba Stadium
	Penalties
	Satsuki Osaka (penalty scored); Takumi Nishiyama (penalty scored); Kairi Hayakawa (penalty scored); Yusuke Uozumi (penalty scored); Juta Nakanishi (penalty missed); Shoya Kurose (penalty scored); Yushiro Shiomi (penalty scored); Ippei Hada (penalty missed)		(penalty scored) Ryuichi Hasegawa; (penalty scored) Motoki Yoshida; (penalty missed) Shun Ito; (penalty scored) Raiku Kameyama; (penalty scored) Rei Kusumi; (penalty scored) Yudai Furuki; (penalty scored) Peter Kwame Aizawa; (penalty scored) Yuki Matsumoto

3 January 2018 3	Kamimura Gakuen	0–1	Yaita Chuo	Saitama
12:05		Report	Tetsuyuki Inami 15'	Stadium: Urawa Komaba Stadium

3 January 2018 3	Osaka Toin	1–1 (3–5 p)	Meishu Hitachi	Setagaya
14:10	Yusuke Kikui 41'	Report	Keita Arai 61'	Stadium: Komazawa Olympic Park Stadium
	Penalties
	Yota Imaoka (penalty scored); Kento Nishiya (penalty scored); Shota Nishiyama (penalty missed); Yusuke Kikui (penalty scored)		(penalty scored) Koki Hashimoto; (penalty scored) Keita Arai; (penalty scored) Takuto Iwatani; (penalty scored) Shuya Takashima; (penalty scored) Rin Fukami

3 January 2018 3	Teikyo Kani	0–5	Ueda Nishi	Setagaya
12:05		Report	Keita Maruyama 40'; Ryo Nemoto 41', 67'; Satoru Tanaka 57', 64'	Stadium: Komazawa Olympic Park Stadium

3 January 2018 3	Ichijo	0–3	Yonago Kita	Kawasaki
12:05		Report	Nichika Sakata 43'; Ryo Takahashi 76'; Ryusei Okuishi 80'	Stadium: Kawasaki Todoroki Stadium

3 January 2018 3	Toyama Daiichi	0–1	Maebashi Ikuei	Kawasaki
14:10		Report	Riku Iijima 80+3'	Stadium: Kawasaki Todoroki Stadium

=== Quarter-finals ===
5 January 2018 4	Nagasaki IAS	0–3	RKU Kashiwa	Saitama
14:10		Report	Ikuma Sekigawa 44'; Taichi Kikuchi 50'; Kazuki Kumasawa 80'	Stadium: Urawa Komaba Stadium

5 January 2018 4	Nihon Bunri	0–1	Yaita Chuo	Saitama
12:05		Report	Jumpei Yamashita 36'	Stadium: Urawa Komaba Stadium

5 January 2018 4	Meishu Hitachi	2–3	Ueda Nishi	Setagaya
12:05	Hayato Iri 12'; Keita Arai 50'	Report	Ryusei Okubo 16'; Ren Miyashita 23'; Takahiro Tanabe 41'	Stadium: Komazawa Olympic Park Stadium

5 January 2018 4	Yonago Kita	0–3	Maebashi Ikuei	Setagaya
14:10		Report	Ryotaro Tsunoda 21'; Itsuki Enomoto 27'; Ko Miyazaki 68'	Stadium: Komazawa Olympic Park Stadium

=== Semi-finals ===
6 January 2018 5	RKU Kashiwa	1–0	Yaita Chuo	Saitama
12:05	Ren Kato 64'	Report		Stadium: Saitama Stadium 2002

6 January 2018 5	Ueda Nishi	1–6	Maebashi Ikuei	Saitama
14:20	Ryo Nemoto 29'	Report	Riku Matsuda 24'; Riku Iijima 27', 86'; Masato Igarashi 35', 63'; Ryosuke Tsurisaki 90+1'	Stadium: Saitama Stadium 2002

=== Final ===
8 January 2018
14:05
6

RKU Kashiwa	0−1	Maebashi Ikuei
	Report (JFA); Report (JFA)	Itsuki Enomoto 90+2'

Saitama Stadium 2002, Saitama
Attendance: 41,337
Referee: Koichiro Fukushima

GK	1	(Japan) Haruto Usui
DF	2	(Japan) Ryuto Kondo
DF	5	(Japan) Ikuma Sekigawa
DF	6	(Japan) Shun Setoyama
DF	12	(Japan) Ren Sato	(substituted off) 85'
DF	20	(Japan) Tatsuya Sambongi
MF	4	(Japan) Yuta Miyamoto (c)
MF	10	(Japan) Taichi Kikuchi
MF	24	(Japan) Taisei Miyamoto	(substituted off) 56'
FW	11	(Japan) Kazuya Ajiro	(substituted off) 85'
FW	14	(Japan) Kazuki Kumasawa	(substituted off) 50'
Substitutes:
GK	25	(Japan) Kosuke Inose
DF	3	(Japan) Keita Sakashita
DF	26	(Japan) Hayata Nishio
mF	7	(Japan) Hiroto Kikyo
MF	8	(Japan) Tetsuru Kanazawa	(substituted in) 85'
MF	9	(Japan) Ren Kato	(substituted in) 50'
MF	16	(Japan) Shogo Tanzawa
MF	19	(Japan) Yoshito Ishikawa	(substituted in) 56'
FW	23	(Japan) Keito Ikeda	(substituted in) 64'
Manager:
(Japan) Yuichiro Honda

GK	12	(Japan) Takuya Yuzawa
DF	2	(Japan) Koki Gotoda
DF	3	(Japan) Ryotaro Tsunoda
DF	5	(Japan) Riku Matsuda
DF	15	(Japan) Taiki Watanabe
MF	7	(Japan) Hayato Shiozawa
MF	8	(Japan) Masato Igarashi	(substituted off) 64'
MF	9	(Japan) Yu Tabei
MF	14	(Japan) Ryo Tabei (c)
FW	10	(Japan) Riku Iijima
FW	22	(Japan) Itsuki Enomoto
Substitutes:
GK	1	(Japan) Shun Matsumoto
DF	6	(Japan) Shunsuke Yamazaki
DF	16	(Japan) Teru Wakatsuki
DF	17	(Japan) Kodai Yamazaki
MF	18	(Japan) Shu Takahashi
MF	23	(Japan) Hiroki Akiyama
MF	25	(Japan) Daigo Morita
MF	13	(Japan) Ko Miyazaki	(substituted in) 64'
FW	24	(Japan) Naoki Takahashi
Manager:
(Japan) Kosuke Yamada

Assistant referees:
Ryo Hirama
Isao Nishihashi
Fourth official:
Masaki Tsuruoka

== Top scorers ==
Rank	Player	High School	Goals
1	(Japan) Riku Iijima	Maebashi Ikuei	7
2	(Japan) Mizuki Ando	Nagasaki IAS	3
2	(Japan) Keita Arai	Meishu Gakuen Hitachi	3
2	(Japan) Taichi Kikuchi	RKU Kashiwa	3
2	(Japan) Ren Kato	RKU Kashiwa	3
2	(Japan) Yusuke Kikui	Osaka Toin	3
2	(Japan) Rei Kusumi	Nihon Bunri	3
2	(Japan) Ryo Nemoto	Ueda Nishi	3
2	(Japan) Kazuki Sato	Sendai Ikuei Gakuen	3
2	(Japan) Sota Sato	Nissho Gakuen	3
