= All Japan University Football Championship =

- Founded: 1953; 72 years ago
- Region: Japan
- Teams: 24
- Current champions: Toyo University (2024, 1st title)
- Most championships: Waseda University (12 titles)
- Website: JFA; JUFA
- 2024 All Japan University Football Championship

The All Japan University Football Championship (全日本大学サッカー選手権大会, Zen'nihon daigaku sakkā senshuken taikai), also known as Intercollegiate nationally, is the main football (soccer) competition for universities across Japan. From 2013 to 2023, the competition was held with 24 participating university teams. The competition was for the first time held in 1953, with the aim of opening the door to regional and lower-ranked university teams that did not have the opportunity to compete at the national level. The competition works similarly to the Japanese Regional Football Champions League, with the best teams from each region qualifying to the main tournament. University teams can only qualify for the Emperor's Cup through prefectural qualification, in where they need to face senior football clubs in order to qualify for it. With it stated, the All Japan University Championship does not qualify the winning team for any other competition, but it is of major relevance among the University football players. The championship is organized by the Japan Football Association and the Japan University Football Association.

High schools and university teams are highly evaluated in Japan. Although the High School championship gets a large amount of spotlight away from the university football, many national team players have played at the competition, or have played for university teams through their youth careers. A recent example is Kaoru Mitoma, who studied and played for University of Tsukuba until 2019, who also stated the university studies and football structure helped him to prepare for professional football. Most of the players at each edition of the competition, after graduating from their respectives universities, most likely goes on to pursue a career on football, either being it at professional or regional level.

In 2023, it was the last time 24 teams participated in the tournament, with 8 teams automatically seeded in the second round. From 2024 onwards, 28 teams participates in the tournament, with preliminary round results determining the 16 teams playing in the Final Round and the 12 teams in the Strengthening Round.

== Past finals ==
| Year | Winner | Result | Runners-up |
|---|---|---|---|
| 1952 | University of Tokyo | 2–1 | Waseda University |
| 1953 | Rikkyo University | 4–2 | Chuo University |
| 1954 | Tokyo University of Education | 2–1 | Chuo University |
| 1955 | Waseda University | 10–1 | Tohoku Gakuin University |
| 1956 | Tokyo University of Education | 2–1 | Waseda University |
| 1957 | Chuo University | 3–0 | Meiji University |
| 1958 | Meiji University | 1–0 | Chuo University |
| 1959 | Chuo University | 1–0 | Hosei University |
| 1960 | Chuo University | 3–0 | Hosei University |
| 1961 | Keio University | 2–1 | Waseda University |
| 1962 | Chuo University | 2–1 | Rikkyo University |
| 1963 | Keio University | 3–2 | Meiji University |
| 1964 | Nihon University | 1–0 | Chuo University |
| 1965 | Chuo University | 3–1 | Rikkyo University |
| 1966 | Waseda University | 4–0 | Chuo University |
| 1967 | Kansai University | 1–0 | Chuo University |
| 1968 | Tokyo University of Education | 3–0 | Kansai University |
| 1969 | Keio University | 1–0 | Rikkyo University |
| 1970 | Hosei University | 2–0 | Osaka University of Commerce |
| 1971 | Tokyo University of Education | 2–1 | Chuo University |
| 1972 | Waseda University | 1–0 (a.e.t.) | Osaka University of Commerce |
| 1973 | Waseda University | 3–0 | Hosei University |
| 1974 | Waseda University | 2–0 | Osaka University of Commerce |
| 1975 | Nippon Sport Science University | 2–0 | Hosei University |
| 1976 | Hosei University | 2–1 | Nippon Sport Science University |
| 1977 | Osaka University of Commerce | 2–0 | Hosei University |
| 1978 | Waseda University | 1–0 | Hosei University |
| 1979 | University of Tsukuba | 2–1 | Hosei University |
| 1980 | Chuo University; University of Tsukuba | 2–2 | Shared trophy |
| 1981 | Nippon Sport Science University | 3–0 | Tokyo University of Agriculture |
| 1982 | Kokushikan University | 3–2 | Waseda University |
| 1983 | Osaka University of Commerce | 2–1 | Juntendo University |
| 1984 | Osaka University of Commerce | 1–0 | Kokushikan University |
| 1985 | Osaka University of Commerce; Osaka University of Health and Sport Sciences | 0–0 (a.e.t.) | Shared trophy |
| 1986 | Waseda University | 4–0 | Tokai University |
| 1987 | Juntendo University | 1–0 | Tokai University |
| 1988 | Juntendo University; Tokai University | 0–0 (a.e.t.) | Shared trophy |
| 1989 | Juntendo University | 4–0 | Tokai University |
| 1990 | Tokai University | 2–2 (5–4 pen.) | Kokushikan University |
| 1991 | Waseda University | 1–1 (4–2 pen.) | Tokai University |
| 1992 | Chuo University | 1–0 | Waseda University |
| 1993 | Waseda University | 3–1 | Doshisha University |
| 1994 | Waseda University | 1–1 (4–1 pen.) | Komazawa University |
| 1995 | Komazawa University | 3–2 | University of Tsukuba |
| 1996 | Kokushikan University | 2–1 (GG) | Waseda University |
| 1997 | Komazawa University | 3–1 | Kokushikan University |
| 1998 | Kokushikan University | 2–1 | Fukuoka University |
| 1999 | Kokushikan University | 2–1 (GG) | University of Tsukuba |
| 2000 | Chukyo University | 2–1 | University of Tsukuba |
| 2001 | Komazawa University | 2–1 | Kokushikan University |
| 2002 | University of Tsukuba | 2–1 (GG) | Kokushikan University |
| 2003 | University of Tsukuba | 1–0 | Komazawa University |
| 2004 | Komazawa University | 5–2 | Ritsumeikan University |
| 2005 | Komazawa University | 2–1 | Juntendo University |
| 2006 | Komazawa University | 6–1 | Waseda University |
| 2007 | Waseda University | 2–0 | Hosei University |
| 2008 | Chuo University | 2–1 | University of Tsukuba |
| 2009 | Meiji University | 2–1 | Fukuoka University |
| 2010 | Kansai University | 2–1 (a.e.t.) | Chukyo University |
| 2011 | Senshu University | 3–0 | Meiji University |
| 2012 | Waseda University | 3–1 | Fukuoka University |
| 2013 | Osaka University of Health and Sport Sciences | 3–1 | Kokushikan University |
| 2014 | Ryutsu Keizai University | 1–0 | Kwansei Gakuin University |
| 2015 | Kwansei Gakuin University | 4–0 | Hannan University |
| 2016 | University of Tsukuba | 8–0 | Nippon Sport Science University |
| 2017 | Ryutsu Keizai University | 5–1 | Hosei University |
| 2018 | Hosei University | 1–0 | Komazawa University |
| 2019 | Meiji University | 3–1 (a.e.t.) | Toin University of Yokohama |
| 2020 | Cancelled due to the COVID-19 pandemic | | |
| 2021 | Komazawa University | 3–2 | Hannan University |
| 2022 | Toin University of Yokohama | 3–2 | Niigata University of Health and Welfare |
| 2023 | Meiji University | 2–0 | Kyoto Sangyo University |
| 2024 | Toyo University | 1–0 | Niigata University of Health and Welfare |

== Most successful universities ==
| P. | Team | Champions | Runners-up | Winning years |
|---|---|---|---|---|
| 1 | Waseda University | 12 | 7 | 1955, 1966, 1972, 1973, 1974, 1978, 1986, 1991, 1993, 1994, 2007, 2012 |
| 2 | University of Tsukuba | 9 | 4 | 1954, 1956, 1968, 1971, 1979, 1980, 2002, 2003, 2016 |
| 3 | Chuo University | 8 | 7 | 1957, 1959, 1960, 1962, 1965, 1980, 1992, 2008 |
| 4 | Komazawa University | 7 | 3 | 1995, 1997, 2001, 2004, 2005, 2006, 2021 |
| 5 | Osaka University of Commerce | 4 | 3 | 1977, 1983, 1984, 1985 |
| 5 | Kokushikan University | 4 | 6 | 1982, 1996, 1998, 1999 |
| 5 | Meiji University | 4 | 3 | 1958, 2009, 2019, 2023 |
| 8 | Keio University | 3 | 0 | 1961, 1963, 1969 |
| 8 | Juntendo University | 3 | 2 | 1987, 1988, 1989 |
| 8 | Hosei University | 3 | 9 | 1970, 1976, 2018 |
| 11 | Nippon Sport Science University | 2 | 2 | 1975, 1981 |
| 11 | Tokai University | 2 | 4 | 1988 ,1990 |
| 11 | Kansai University | 2 | 1 | 1967, 2010 |
| 11 | Osaka University of Health and Sport Sciences | 2 | 0 | 1985, 2013 |
| 11 | Ryutsu Keizai University | 2 | 0 | 2014, 2017 |
| 16 | University of Tokyo | 1 | 0 | 1952 |
| 16 | Rikkyo University | 1 | 3 | 1953 |
| 16 | Nihon University | 1 | 0 | 1964 |
| 16 | Chukyo University | 1 | 1 | 2000 |
| 16 | Senshu University | 1 | 0 | 2011 |
| 16 | Kwansei Gakuin University | 1 | 1 | 2015 |
| 16 | Toin University of Yokohama | 1 | 1 | 2022 |
| 16 | Toyo University | 1 | 0 | 2024 |
| 24 | Fukuoka University | 0 | 3 | |
| 24 | Hannan University | 0 | 2 | |
| 24 | Niigata University of Health and Welfare | 0 | 2 | |
| 24 | Tohoku Gakuin University | 0 | 1 | |
| 24 | Tokyo University of Agriculture | 0 | 1 | |
| 24 | Doshisha University | 0 | 1 | |
| 24 | Ritsumeikan University | 0 | 1 | |
| 24 | Kyoto Sangyo University | 0 | 1 | |
