= Kyosanto =

Kyosanto may refer to:

- Japan Communist Party (Marxist-Leninist)
- Japanese Communist Party

== See also ==
- Kyo Sato (born 2000), Japanese footballer
