= Akito Saito =

Japanese footballer

Personal information
- Date of birth: 15 August 1999 (age 27)
- Place of birth: Japan
- Height: 1.85 m (6 ft 1 in)
- Position: Centre-back

Team information
- Current team: Yadanarbon
- Number: 73

Youth career
- 2015–2017: Jissen Gakuen High School

College career
Years	Team	Apps	(Gls)
2018–2021	Sanno Institute of Management		

Senior career*
Years	Team	Apps	(Gls)
2022	Lernayin Artsakh		
2022–2023	Aizawl	21	(1)
2023–2025	Kaya–Iloilo	21	(0)
2025	Trat	6	(0)
2026	Mahasarakham	11	(0)
2026–	Yadanarbon	0	(0)
- * Club domestic league appearances and goals as of 1 December 2025

Akito Saito (斎藤 彰人, Saito Akihito; born 15 August 1999) is a Japanese professional footballer who plays as a centre back for Yadanarbon of the Myanmar National League.

== Club career ==
=== Youth and college career ===
Saito studied and played football for Jissen Gakuen High School, which competed in the 2017 All Japan High School Soccer Tournament. After high school he played for the football team of Sanno University.

=== Lernayin Artsakh ===
After graduating, Saito joined Lernayin Artsakh of the Armenian Premier League in July 2022. However, he would go on to make only one appearance for the club, leaving two months after he joined.

=== Aizawl ===
After his short stint in Armenia, Saito joined fellow Japanese player Eisuke Mohri at I-League club Aizawl as part of their foreign reinforcements. He made his debut against Gokulam Kerala in a 1–0 loss, playing the full 90 minutes, and scored his first goal for the club in a 1–0 win against NEROCA. He would make 21 appearances that season.

=== Kaya–Iloilo ===
In August 2023, Saito left Aizawl to join Kaya–Iloilo, the reigning champions of the Philippines Football League, as their designated Asian player for the club's campaign in the 2023–24 AFC Champions League, joining Japanese compatriot Daizo Horikoshi. He made his first appearance for the club in the domestic cup competition, the Copa Paulino Alcantara, as Kaya won 7–0 over rivals Loyola.

== Honours ==
=== Kaya–Iloilo ===
- Philippines Football League: 2024
