= Kazuyoshi Shimabuku =

Peruvian footballer (born 1999)

Kazuyoshi Shimabuku シマブク･カズヨシ
Personal information
- Date of birth: 29 July 1999 (age 27)
- Place of birth: Lima, Peru
- Height: 1.65 m (5 ft 5 in)
- Position: Forward

Team information
- Current team: Albirex Niigata
- Number: 17

Youth career
- Higashimatsuyama Shinjuku SSS
- Higashimatsuyama Pelenia FC
- –2017: Urawa Red Diamonds

College career
Years	Team	Apps	(Gls)
2018–2022	Niigata University HW		

Senior career*
Years	Team	Apps	(Gls)
2021–	Albirex Niigata	34	(5)
2024–2025	→ Fujieda MYFC (loan)	66	(2)
- * Club domestic league appearances and goals as of 16 August 2026

Kazuyoshi Shimabuku (シマブク･カズヨシ, Shimabuku Kazuyoshi; born 29 July 1999) is a Peruvian professional footballer who plays as a forward for J2 League club Albirex Niigata.

== Personal life ==
Born in Peru, he belongs to the Japanese Peruvian community. He emigrated to Japan at age 3 and was naturalized as a Japanese citizen in 2021.

== Club career ==
He joined Urawa Red Diamonds at his youth after playing for the high school teams of Higashimatsuyama. He later joined Albirex Niigata, his first professional contract, in 2021, and later winning promotion to J1 League after two years, although he had played more in J.League Cup rather than in the regular J.League seasons.

On 25 December 2023, Shimabuku was announced at Fujieda MYFC on a loan deal.

== International career ==
In May 2023, it was reported that Juan Reynoso, former head coach of Peru national football team, is trying to convince Kazuyoshi to represent Peru internationally, and has set sight on him.

== Career statistics ==
=== Club ===
As of 12 May 2026.

Appearances and goals by club, season and competition
Club	Season	League			National cup (Note: Includes Emperor Cup)		League cup (Note: Includes J.League Cup)		Total	
Club	Season	Division	Apps	Goals	Apps	Goals	Apps	Goals	Apps	Goals
Niigata University of Health and Welfare	2018	–			1	0	–		1	0
Niigata University of Health and Welfare	2020	–			2	0	–		1	0
Niigata University of Health and Welfare	Total		0	0	3	0	0	0	3	0
Albirex Niigata	2021	J2 League	2	0	0	0	0	0	2	0
Albirex Niigata	2022	J2 League	12	1	1	0	0	0	13	1
Albirex Niigata	2023	J1 League	3	0	1	0	5	0	9	0
Albirex Niigata	2026	J2/J3 (100)	11	2	0	0	0	0	11	2
Albirex Niigata	Total		28	3	2	0	5	0	35	3
Fujieda MYFC (loan)	2024	J2 League	31	1	1	1	1	0	33	2
Fujieda MYFC (loan)	2025	J2 League	35	1	1	0	0	0	36	1
Fujieda MYFC (loan)	Total		66	2	2	1	1	0	69	3
Career total			94	5	7	1	6	0	107	6

== Honours ==
Albirex Niigata

- J2 League: 2022
