= Shin Yamada =

Japanese footballer

Shin Yamada 山田 新
Personal information
- Date of birth: 30 May 2000 (age 26)
- Place of birth: Aoba-ku, Yokohama, Japan
- Height: 1.75 m (5 ft 9 in)
- Position: Forward

Team information
- Current team: Oud-Heverlee Leuven (on loan from Celtic)
- Number: 20

Youth career
- Kamoe FC
- Suisho SC
- –2018: Kawasaki Frontale

College career
Years	Team	Apps	(Gls)
2019–2022	Toin University of Yokohama		

Senior career*
Years	Team	Apps	(Gls)
2022–2025	Kawasaki Frontale	86	(25)
2025–	Celtic	8	(0)
2026	→ Preußen Münster (loan)	10	(3)
2026–	→ Oud-Heverlee Leuven (loan)	3	(0)

International career^{‡}
2022	Japan U23	1	(0)
2025–	Japan	1	(0)
- * Club domestic league appearances and goals as of 2 September 2026 ‡ National team caps and goals as of 8 July 2025

Shin Yamada (山田 新, Yamada Shin; born 30 May 2000) is a Japanese professional footballer who plays as a forward for Belgian Pro League club Oud-Heverlee Leuven, on loan from Scottish Premiership club Celtic, and the Japan national team.

== Club career ==
Named as a designated special player ahead of the 2022 season, Yamada made his debut for Kawasaki Frontale in the J.League Cup against Cerezo Osaka.

On 19 July 2025, Yamada signed for Scottish Premiership club Celtic on a four year contract. He made his debut for the Bhoys in a 2–0 victory over Aberdeen on 10 August.

On 27 January 2026, having made only one start and ten substitute appearances for the first-team, Yamada joined 2. Bundesliga side Preußen Münster on loan until the end of the season.

On 14 July 2026, after being on loan with Preußen Münster he signed on loan with Belgian Pro League side OH Leuven until the end of the season.

== International career ==
Yamada made his international debut for Japan on 12 July 2025 when he came on as a substitute against Hong Kong in the 2025 EAFF E-1 Football Championship, a match that Japan won 6–1.

== Career statistics ==
=== Club ===
As of 26 April 2026

Appearances and goals by club, season and competition
Club	Season	League			National cup		League cup		Continental		Other		Total	
Club	Season	Division	Apps	Goals	Apps	Goals	Apps	Goals	Apps	Goals	Apps	Goals	Apps	Goals
Toin University of Yokohama	2019	–			1 (Note: Appearances in the Emperor's Cup)	3	–		–		–		1	3
Toin University of Yokohama	2020	–			2	1	–		–		–		2	1
Toin University of Yokohama	2022	–			1	1	–		–		–		1	1
Toin University of Yokohama	Total		0	0	4	5	0	0	0	0	0	0	4	5
Kawasaki Frontale	2022	J1 League	0	0	0	0	1 (Note: Appearances in the J.League Cup)	0	0	0	0	0	1	0
Kawasaki Frontale	2023	J1 League	27	4	4	1	6	1	3 (Note: Appearances in the AFC Champions League)	0	–		40	6
Kawasaki Frontale	2024	J1 League	38	19	2	1	4	0	6	1	1 (Note: Appearance in Japanese Super Cup)	0	51	21
Kawasaki Frontale	2025	J1 League	20	9	1	2	0	0	6	1	–		27	5
Kawasaki Frontale	Total		85	25	7	4	11	1	15	2	1	0	119	32
Celtic	2025–26	Scottish Premiership	8	0	1	0	1	0	1	0	1 (Note: Appearance in Scottish Challenge Cup)	0	12	0
Preußen Münster	2025–26	2. Bundesliga	7	1	0	0	0	0	0	0	0	0	7	1
Career total			100	26	12	9	12	1	16	2	2	0	142	38

== Honours ==
Kawasaki Frontale

- Japanese Super Cup: 2024

Celtic

- Scottish Premiership: 2025-26

Japan

- EAFF Championship: 2025
