= Shunta Araki =

Japanese footballer

Shunta Araki 荒木 駿太
Personal information
- Date of birth: 24 October 1999 (age 27)
- Place of birth: Fukuoka, Japan
- Height: 1.69 m (5 ft 7 in)
- Position: Forward

Team information
- Current team: Vegalta Sendai
- Number: 47

Youth career
- Seto Wings
- Lowen Fukuoka
- 2015–2017: Nagasaki IAS High School

College career
Years	Team	Apps	(Gls)
2018–2021	Komazawa University		

Senior career*
Years	Team	Apps	(Gls)
2022–2023	Sagan Tosu	12	(0)
2023	→ Machida Zelvia (loan)	42	(6)
2024	Machida Zelvia	23	(1)
2025–	Vegalta Sendai	55	(4)
- * Club domestic league appearances and goals as of 17 August 2026

Shunta Araki (荒木 駿太, Araki Shunta; born 24 October 1999) is a Japanese footballer who plays as a forward for J2 League club, Vegalta Sendai.

== Youth career ==
At Nagasaki IAS High School, Araki appeared in the high school soccer championship in the second year. He subsequently appeared in next year's championship.

On 15 January 2018, it was announced that Araki would join Komazawa University.

== Career ==
=== Sagan Tosu ===
On 23 May 2021, Araki was announced at Sagan Tosu. He scored his first goal for the club in the J.League Cup against Kyoto Sanga on 2 March 2022, scoring in the 86th minute. Araki made his league debut against Nagoya Grampus on 6 March 2022.

=== Loan to Machida Zelvia ===
On 15 December 2022, Araki joined Machida Zelvia on loan. He made his league debut against Vegalta Sendai on 19 February 2023. Araki scored his first league goal against Zweigen Kanazawa on 5 March 2023, scoring in the 90th+1st minute.

=== Machida Zelvia ===
Araki made his league debut against Sagan Tosu on 30 March 2024. He scored his first league goal against Kashiwa Reysol on 3 May 2024, scoring in the 68th minute.

=== Vegalta Sendai ===
On 27 December 2024, Araki was announce official transfer to J2 club, Vegalta Sendai from 2025 season.

== Career statistics ==
=== Club ===
As of the match played 15 February 2025.

Appearances and goals by club, season and competition
Club	Season	League			National Cup		League Cup		Other		Total	
Club	Season	Division	Apps	Goals	Apps	Goals	Apps	Goals	Apps	Goals	Apps	Goals
Japan			League		Emperor's Cup		J.League Cup		Other		Total	
Komazawa University	2018	–			1	0	–				1	0
Komazawa University	2021	–			1	0	–				1	0
Sagan Tosu	2022	J1 League	12	0	2	0	4	1	–		18	1
Machida Zelvia (loan)	2023	J2 League	42	6	3	0	–				45	6
Machida Zelvia	2024	J1 League	23	1	1	0	4	0	–		28	1
Vegalta Sendai	2025	J2 League	1	0	0	0	0	0	–		1	0
Career total			78	7	8	0	8	1	0	0	94	8

== Honours ==
Komazawa University

- All Japan University Football Championship: 2021

FC Machida Zelvia

- J2 League: 2023
