= Hiiro Komori =

Japanese footballer (born 2000)

Hiiro Komori 小森 飛絢
Personal information
- Date of birth: 6 August 2000 (age 26)
- Place of birth: Toyama, Japan
- Height: 1.78 m (5 ft 10 in)
- Position: Forward

Team information
- Current team: Urawa Red Diamonds
- Number: 17

Youth career
- FC Higashi
- 2016–2018: Toyama Daiichi High School

College career
Years	Team	Apps	(Gls)
2019–2022	Niigata University of H&W		

Senior career*
Years	Team	Apps	(Gls)
2022–2025	JEF United Chiba	73	(36)
2025	→ Sint-Truiden (loan)	5	(0)
2025–	Urawa Red Diamonds	21	(7)
- * Club domestic league appearances and goals as of 10 August 2026

Hiiro Komori (小森 飛絢, Komori Hiiro; born 6 August 2000) is a Japanese professional footballer who plays as a forward for J1 League club Urawa Red Diamonds.

== Youth career ==
Komori started out at FC Higashi. They trained on the same pitch as one of the strongest high school teams in Toyama Prefecture, Toyama Daiichi High School. Through this connection, he would make his way up to the school's first team. In 2017 and 2018, Komori represented Toyama Daiichi High School in the Inter High School Championship and the Prince Takamado Trophy JFA U-18 Football League. In August 2018 in the Inter High School Championship, Komori scored seven goals in the space of three games, including two hat-tricks. Toyama Daiichi were knocked out by the eventual tournament winners Toko Gakuen High School in the quarter-finals. He finished as the tournament's top scorer.

In 2019, Komori began his University football career at Niigata University of Health and Welfare. He made his debut in a 1–1 draw with Fukuoka University in August 2019 and scored his first goal for in a 4–3 victory over the National Institute of Fitness and Sports in Kanoya. In his first three years, Komori scored five goals in ten appearances.

In June 2022, Komori scored his highest profile goal for the university in a 2–1 defeat to J1 League team Kashima Antlers in the Emperor's Cup.

== Club career ==
=== JEF United Chiba ===
In July 2022, it was announced that Komori would be joining J2 League team JEF United Chiba for the 2023 season. Furthermore, in the following month, Komori was approved to be a designated special player for the remainder of the season, meaning he could represent both his university and JEF United Chiba. He made his debut in a 1–0 league defeat to V-Varen Nagasaki, one of two appearances he made as a designated special player.

In 2023, Komori scored on his professional debut in a 1–0 league victory over V-Varen Nagasaki. His scoring form continued early in the season, as he scored a goal in each of his first three games of the season. In his debut season, Komori scored 14 goals in 35 games across all competitions and was JEF United Chiba's top scorer and was fourth-highest scorer in the league with 13. At the end of season J2 awards ceremony, he was inducted into the 2023 J2 Best XI.

Komori continued his goalscoring form into the 2024 season with four goals in his first six league games. In September he was in incredible form, scoring 12 goals in 7 games and helping JEF United Chiba climb into the promotion play-off places. For his efforts, he was awarded the J2 League Monthly MVP award. He finished the season with 22 goals in 37 appearances, with JEF United Chiba narrowly missing out on a place in the play-offs. Komori ended as the J2 League's top scorer, he was inducted into the Best XI for the second straight season and also won the J2 Player of the Year award.

=== Loan to Sint-Truiden ===
In January 2025, it was announced that Komori would be moving overseas, with a loan to Belgian Pro League club Sint-Truiden. He joins a growing contingent of Japanese players at STVV, Komori being the sixth Japanese player at the club. He made his debut on 19 January, appearing as a substitute in a 2–1 league defeat to Standard Liège. He made five substitute appearances during his six months with the club.

=== Urawa Red Diamomds ===
In June 2025, Komori made a permanent transfer to J1 League club Urawa Red Diamonds.

== International career ==
In September 2022, Komori was selected as part of an All-Japan University Selection to tour Korea and Cambodia.

== Career statistics ==
=== Club ===
As of end of 2025 season

Appearances and goals by club, season and competition
Club	Season	League			National cup (Note: Includes Emperor's Cup)		League cup (Note: Includes J. League Cup)		Other		Total	
Club	Season	Division	Apps	Goals	Apps	Goals	Apps	Goals	Apps	Goals	Apps	Goals
Niigata University of H&W	2020	–			2	0	–		–		2	0
Niigata University of H&W	2022	–			2	1	–		–		2	1
Niigata University of H&W	Total		0	0	4	1	0	0	0	0	4	1
JEF United Chiba	2022	J2 League	2	0	0	0	–		–		2	0
JEF United Chiba	2023	J2 League	33	13	1	0	–		1 (Note: Appearance in J1/J2 play-offs)	1	35	14
JEF United Chiba	2024	J2 League	38	23	2	0	1	0	0	0	37	22
JEF United Chiba	Total		73	36	3	0	1	0	1	1	78	37
Sint-Truiden (loan)	2024–25	Belgian Pro League	5	0	0	0	–		–		5	0
Urawa Red Diamonds	2025	J1 League	11	4	2	1	1	0	0	0	14	5
Career total			89	40	9	2	2	0	1	1	101	43

== Honours ==
Individual

- J2 League Best XI: 2023, 2024
- J2 League top scorer: 2024
- J2 Player of the Year: 2024
