= Gakuto Kondo =

Japanese footballer

Personal information
- Full name: Gakuto Kondo
- Date of birth: February 10, 1981 (age 45)
- Place of birth: Toyokawa, Aichi, Japan
- Height: 1.74 m (5 ft 8 1/2 in)
- Position: Defender

Youth career
- 1999: Osaka University of Health and Sport Sciences
- 2003–2006: Biwako Seikei Sport College

Senior career*
Years	Team	Apps	(Gls)
2007–2012	Vissel Kobe	35	(2)
2013	Mito HollyHock	14	(0)
2014–2017	FC Osaka	4	(0)
- * Club domestic league appearances and goals as of 31 January 2018

Gakuto Kondo (近藤 岳登, Kondo Gakuto; born February 10, 1981) is a former Japanese football player. He last played for FC Osaka.

== Career ==
After a long career with Vissel Kobe, Mito HollyHock, and lastly FC Osaka, Kondo announced his retirement in January 2018.

== Club statistics ==
Updated to 20 February 2018.

Club performance			League		Cup		League Cup		Total	
Season	Club	League	Apps	Goals	Apps	Goals	Apps	Goals	Apps	Goals
Japan			League		Emperor's Cup		J.League Cup		Total	
2007	Vissel Kobe	J1 League	0	0	0	0	0	0	0	0
2008	Vissel Kobe	J1 League	1	0	0	0	3	0	4	0
2009	Vissel Kobe	J1 League	4	0	0	0	0	0	4	0
2010	Vissel Kobe	J1 League	7	1	1	0	1	0	0	0
2011	Vissel Kobe	J1 League	19	0	1	0	0	0	0	0
2012	Vissel Kobe	J1 League	4	1	0	0	1	0	0	0
2013	Mito HollyHock	J2 League	14	0	0	0	–		14	0
2014	FC Osaka	JRL (Kansai, Div. 1)	4	0	0	0	–		4	0
2015	FC Osaka	JFL	0	0	0	0	–		0	0
2016	FC Osaka	JFL	0	0	–		–		0	0
2017	FC Osaka	JFL	0	0	–		–		0	0
Career total			53	2	2	0	5	0	60	2
