= Yohei Okuyama =

Japanese footballer

Personal information
- Date of birth: 28 October 1999 (age 27)
- Place of birth: Okayama, Japan
- Height: 1.73 m (5 ft 8 in)
- Position: Midfielder

Team information
- Current team: Renofa Yamaguchi FC
- Number: 30

Youth career
- 2015–2017: Saidaiji High School

College career
Years	Team	Apps	(Gls)
2018–2021	Hannan University		

Senior career*
Years	Team	Apps	(Gls)
2019–2020	Hannan University Club	14	(0)
2022–2023	Iwate Grulla Morioka	32	(2)
2023–2024	Machida Zelvia	1	(0)
2024	Renofa Yamaguchi FC (loan)	13	(0)
2025–	Renofa Yamaguchi FC	16	(0)
- * Club domestic league appearances and goals as of 1 January 2026

Yohei Okuyama (奥山 洋平, Okuyama Yohei; born 28 October 1999) is a Japanese footballer currently playing as a midfielder for Renofa Yamaguchi FC.

== Career statistics ==
=== Club ===
As of 26 February 2022.

Club	Season	League			National Cup		League Cup		Other		Total	
Club	Season	Division	Apps	Goals	Apps	Goals	Apps	Goals	Apps	Goals	Apps	Goals
Hannan University FC	2019	Kansai Soccer League	8	0	0	0	–		0	0	8	0
Hannan University FC	2020	Kansai Soccer League	6	0	0	0	–		1 (Note: Appearances in the relegation playoffs)	1	7	1
Hannan University FC	Total		14	0	0	0	0	0	1	1	15	1
Iwate Grulla Morioka	2022	J2 League	1	0	0	0	0	0	0	0	1	0
Career total			15	0	0	0	0	0	1	1	16	1
