= Yusuke Kikui =

Japanese footballer

Yusuke Kikui 菊井 悠介
Personal information
- Date of birth: 17 September 1999 (age 27)
- Place of birth: Osaka, Japan
- Height: 1.73 m (5 ft 8 in)
- Position: Forward

Team information
- Current team: Fujieda MYFC
- Number: 10

Youth career
- Iris FC Sumiyoshi
- –2014: Vissel Kobe
- 2015–2017: Osaka Toin High School

College career
Years	Team	Apps	(Gls)
2018–2021	Ryutsu Keizai University		

Senior career*
Years	Team	Apps	(Gls)
2018	Ryutsu Keizai University FC	6	(2)
2019–2020	RKD Ryugasaki	19	(8)
2022–2026	Matsumoto Yamaga	126	(21)
2026–	Fujieda MYFC	13	(3)
- * Club domestic league appearances and goals as of 13 August 2026

Yusuke Kikui (菊井 悠介, Kikui Yosuke; born 17 September 1999) is a Japanese footballer who plays as a forward for Fujieda MYFC].

== Club career ==
Kikui was consistently named top goal-scorer at tournaments. He was announced as a player of Matsumoto Yamaga ahead of the 2022 season.

== Career statistics ==
=== Club ===
As of 14 March 2022.

Club	Season	League			National Cup		League Cup		Other		Total	
Club	Season	Division	Apps	Goals	Apps	Goals	Apps	Goals	Apps	Goals	Apps	Goals
Ryutsu Keizai University FC	2018	Kantō Soccer League	6	2	0	0	–		1 (Note: Appearances in the Shakaijin Cup)	0	7	2
RKD Ryugasaki	2019	JFL	10	2	0	0	–		0	0	10	2
RKD Ryugasaki	2020	Kantō Soccer League	9	6	0	0	–		0	0	9	6
RKD Ryugasaki	Total		19	8	0	0	0	0	0	0	19	8
Matsumoto Yamaga FC	2022	J3 League	1	0	0	0	–		0	0	1	0
Career total			26	10	0	0	0	0	1	0	27	10

== Honours ==
Individual

- J3 League Best XI: 2023
