= Yuta Fujihara =

Japanese footballer (born 1999)

Yuta Fujihara 藤原 悠汰
Personal information
- Full name: Yuta Fujihara
- Date of birth: 9 April 1999 (age 27)
- Place of birth: Hiroshima, Japan
- Height: 1.65 m (5 ft 5 in)
- Position: Forward

Team information
- Current team: Ehime FC
- Number: 11

Youth career
- –2014: Sanfrecce Hiroshima
- 2015–2017: Hiroshima Minami High School

College career
Years	Team	Apps	(Gls)
2018–2021	Meiji University		

Senior career*
Years	Team	Apps	(Gls)
2022–2023	Sagan Tosu	15	(2)
2022	→ Montedio Yamagata (loan)	6	(0)
2024–	Ehime FC	27	(1)
- * Club domestic league appearances and goals as of 17 August 2026

Yuta Fujihara (藤原 悠汰, Fujihara Yuta; born 9 April 1999) is a Japanese footballer who plays as a forward for J3 League club Ehime FC.

== Career ==
Fujihara started his career at Sagan Tosu, then moved on loan to J2 League club Montedio Yamagata during the 2022 season. He returned to Sagan Tosu for the 2023 season.

In December 2023, it was announced that Fujihara would be joining newly promoted J2 League club Ehime FC ahead of the 2024 season.

== Career statistics ==
=== Club ===
As of 4 June 2024.

Appearances and goals by club, season and competition
Club	Season	League			National Cup		League Cup		Total	
Club	Season	Division	Apps	Goals	Apps	Goals	Apps	Goals	Apps	Goals
Japan			League		Emperor's Cup		J. League Cup		Total	
Sagan Tosu	2022	J1 League	8	1	1	0	5	2	14	3
Sagan Tosu	2023	J1 League	7	1	1	2	6	0	14	3
Sagan Tosu	Total		15	2	2	2	11	2	28	6
Montedio Yamagata (loan)	2022	J2 League	6	0	0	0	–		6	0
Ehime FC	2024	J2 League	3	0	0	0	1	0	4	0
Career total			24	2	2	2	12	2	38	6
