= Ryō Nemoto =

Japanese footballer

Ryō Nemoto 根本 凌
Personal information
- Full name: Ryō Nemoto
- Date of birth: 3 February 2000 (age 26)
- Place of birth: Chigasaki, Kanagawa, Japan
- Height: 1.83 m (6 ft 0 in)
- Position: Forward

Team information
- Current team: Mito HollyHock
- Number: 9

Youth career
- Owada FC
- Shoot FC
- 2015–2017: Ueda Nishi High School

College career
Years	Team	Apps	(Gls)
2018–2021	NIFS Kanoya		

Senior career*
Years	Team	Apps	(Gls)
2020–2025	Shonan Bellmare	27	(1)
2022	→ Tochigi SC (loan)	20	(5)
2023	→ Tochigi SC (loan)	31	(6)
2025–	Mito HollyHock	14	(0)
- * Club domestic league appearances and goals as of 12 August 2026

Ryō Nemoto (根本 凌, Nemoto Ryō; born 3 February 2000) is a Japanese footballer currently playing as a forward for Mito HollyHock.

== Early life ==
Ryō was born in Chigasaki. He went to Ueda Nishi High School and the NIFS Kanoya.

== Career ==
Ryō made his debut for Shonan against Vissel Kobe on 5 September 2020.

In his first spell with Tochigi, Ryō made his debut and scored his first goal for the club. He scored in the 90th+4th minute to draw the game 1–1.

In his second spell with Tochigi, Ryō made his debut on 19 February 2023. He scored a brace on 12 April 2023.

== Career statistics ==
=== Club ===
As of 15 June 2022.

Club	Season	League			National Cup		League Cup		Other		Total	
Club	Season	Division	Apps	Goals	Apps	Goals	Apps	Goals	Apps	Goals	Apps	Goals
N.I.F.S. Kanoya	2019	–			2 (Note: Appearances in the Emperor's Cup)	1	–		0	0	2	1
Shonan Bellmare	2020	J1 League	2	0	0	0	0	0	0	0	2	0
Shonan Bellmare	2021	J1 League	1	0	0	0	3	1	0	0	4	1
Shonan Bellmare	2022	J1 League	0	0	1	0	0	0	0	0	1	0
Tochigi SC (on loan)	2022	J2 League	0	0	0	0	0	0	0	0	0	0
Career total			3	0	3	1	3	1	0	0	9	2
