= Ryota Takada =

Japanese footballer

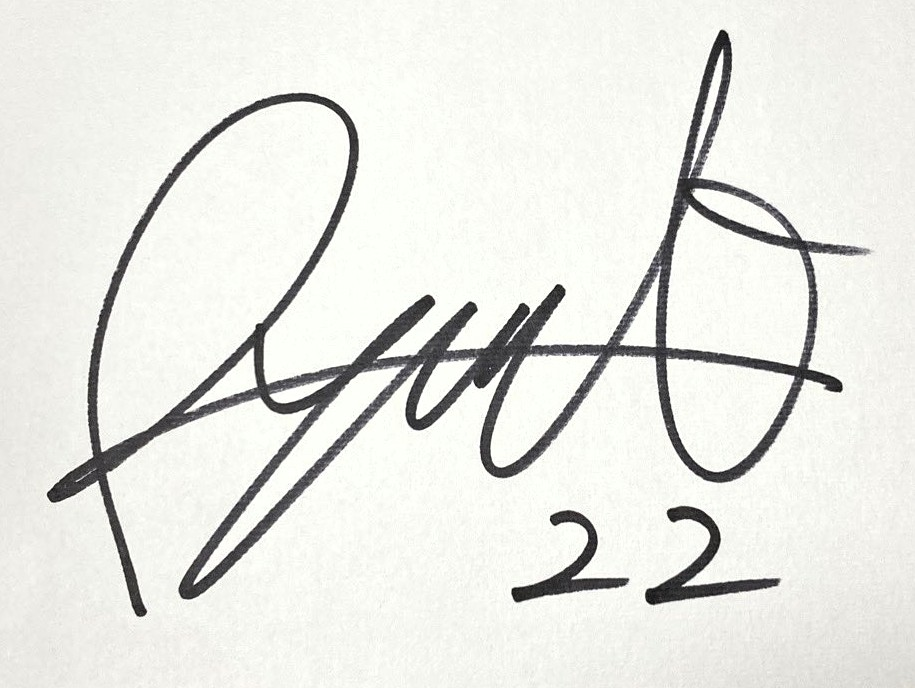

Personal information
- Full name: Ryota Takada
- Date of birth: 10 June 2000 (age 26)
- Place of birth: Nobeoka, Miyazaki, Japan
- Height: 1.73 m (5 ft 8 in)
- Position: Defender

Team information
- Current team: Vegalta Sendai
- Number: 22

Youth career
- –2012: Taiyo Nobeoka SC
- 2013–2015: Nissho Gakuen Junior High School
- 2016–2018: Nissho Gakuen High School

College career
Years	Team	Apps	(Gls)
2019–2022	Hannan University		

Senior career*
Years	Team	Apps	(Gls)
2019	Hannan University		
2022–2024	Blaublitz Akita	32	(0)
2024-	Vegalta Sendai	63	(4)
- * Club domestic league appearances and goals as of 17 August 2026

Ryota Takada (髙田 椋汰, Takada Ryota; born 10 June 2000) is a Japanese footballer who plays as a defender for J2 League club Vegalta Sendai.

== Career statistics ==
=== Club ===
As of 20 October 2022.

Club	Season	League			National Cup		League Cup		Other		Total	
Club	Season	Division	Apps	Goals	Apps	Goals	Apps	Goals	Apps	Goals	Apps	Goals
Blaublitz Akita	2022	J2 League	2	0	0	0	0	0	0	0	2	0
Blaublitz Akita	2023	J2 League	0	0	0	0	0	0	0	0	0	0
Career total			2	0	0	0	0	0	0	0	2	0
