= Masato Igarashi =

Japanese footballer

Personal information
- Date of birth: 13 June 1999 (age 27)
- Place of birth: Utsunomiya, Tochigi, Japan
- Height: 1.76 m (5 ft 9 in)
- Position: Midfielder

Team information
- Current team: FC Basara Hyogo
- Number: 11

Youth career
- –2014: Tomozo SC
- 2015–2017: Maebashi Ikuei High School

College career
Years	Team	Apps	(Gls)
2018–2022	NIFS Kanoya		

Senior career*
Years	Team	Apps	(Gls)
2021–2023	Tochigi SC	16	(0)
2023	→ Reilac Shiga FC (loan)	11	(0)
2024	Reilac Shiga FC	24	(1)
2025–	FC Basara Hyogo	14	(2)
- * Club domestic league appearances and goals as of 22:01, 3 June 2026 (UTC)

Masato Igarashi (五十嵐 理人, Igarashi Masato; born 13 June 1999) is a Japanese footballer currently playing as a midfielder for FC Basara Hyogo.

== Career statistics ==
=== Club ===
As of 21 August 2022.

Club	Season	League			National Cup		League Cup		Other		Total	
Club	Season	Division	Apps	Goals	Apps	Goals	Apps	Goals	Apps	Goals	Apps	Goals
N.I.F.S. Kanoya	2019	–			1 (Note: Appearances in the Emperor's Cup)	0	–		0	0	1	0
N.I.F.S. Kanoya	2020	–			2	1	–		0	0	2	1
N.I.F.S. Kanoya	Total		0	0	3	1	0	0	0	0	3	1
Tochigi SC	2021	J2 League	3	0	0	0	–		0	0	3	0
Tochigi SC	2022	J2 League	11	0	1	0	–		0	0	12	0
Tochigi SC	Total		14	0	1	0	0	0	0	0	15	0
Career total			14	0	4	1	0	0	0	0	18	1
