= Ko Miyazaki =

Japanese footballer

Ko Miyazaki 宮崎 鴻
Personal information
- Date of birth: 5 August 1999 (age 27)
- Place of birth: Tokyo, Japan
- Height: 1.84 m (6 ft 0 in)
- Position: Forward

Team information
- Current team: Vegalta Sendai
- Number: 9

Youth career
- Little Indians SC
- –2014: Mitsubishi Yowa
- 2015–2017: Maebashi Ikuei High School

College career
Years	Team	Apps	(Gls)
2018–2021	Komazawa University		

Senior career*
Years	Team	Apps	(Gls)
2022–2024	Tochigi SC	89	(11)
2025–	Vegalta Sendai	36	(9)
- * Club domestic league appearances and goals as of 17 August 2026

Ko Miyazaki (宮崎 鴻, Miyazaki Ko; born 5 August 1999) is a Japanese footballer who playing as a forward and currently play for J2 League club, Vegalta Sendai.

== Career ==
On 8 November 2021, Miyazaki was announce that will be joining to Tochigi SC from 2022. He leave from the club in 2024 after two years at Tochigi due to his team suffered relegation to J3 League from 2025 season.

On 22 December 2024, Miyazaki was announce official permanent transfer to fellow J2 club, Vegalta Sendai from 2025 season. At the same time, Shunta Araki also transferred and this will be his first time playing since Komazawa University.

== Personal life ==
Ko Miyazaki was born in Tokyo, Japan. His family is a Japanese father and an Australian mother.

== Career statistics ==
=== Club ===
As of the match played 15 February 2025.

Club	Season	League			National Cup		League Cup		Other		Total	
Club	Season	Division	Apps	Goals	Apps	Goals	Apps	Goals	Apps	Goals	Apps	Goals
Tochigi SC	2022	J2 League	26	3	3	0	–				29	3
Tochigi SC	2023	J2 League	29	2	1	0	–				30	2
Tochigi SC	2024	J2 League	34	6	0	0	1	0	–		35	6
Vegalta Sendai	2025	J2 League	1	0	0	0	0	0	0	0	1	0
Career total			90	11	4	0	1	0	0	0	95	11
