= Nagoya Keizai University =

Private Japanese university

- 名古屋経済大学
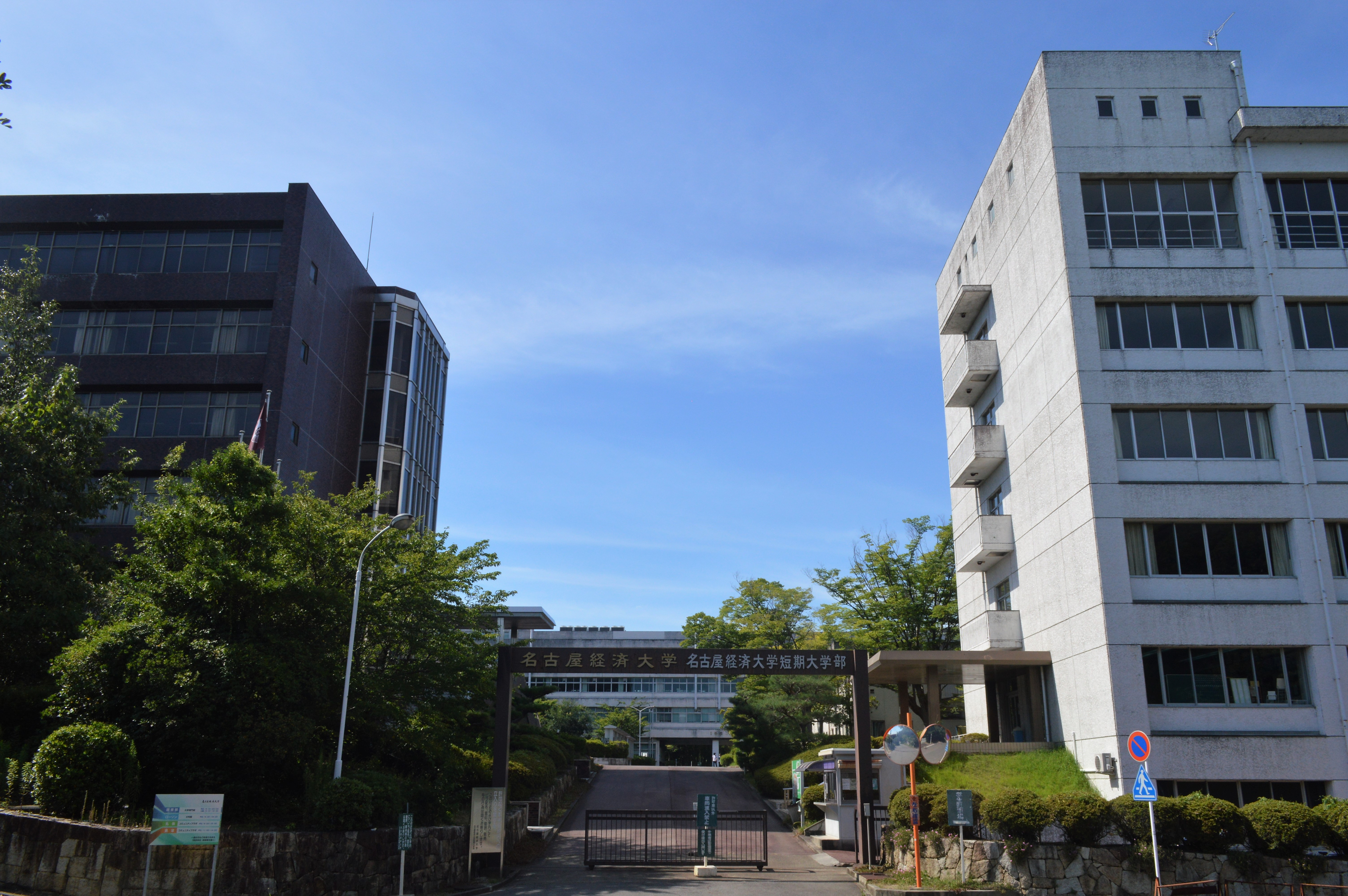
- Nagoya Keizai University
- Type: Private
- Established: 1965
- Location: Inuyama, Aichi, Japan; 35.3197°N 136.9538°E
- Website: www.nagoya-ku.ac.jp (in Japanese)

Nagoya Keizai University (名古屋経済大学, Nagoya keizai daigaku) is a private university in Inuyama, Aichi, Japan. The predecessor of the school, a junior college, was founded in 1965. The present name was adopted in 1983.
