= Maebashi Athletic Stadium =

Stadium in Maebashi, Gunma, Japan

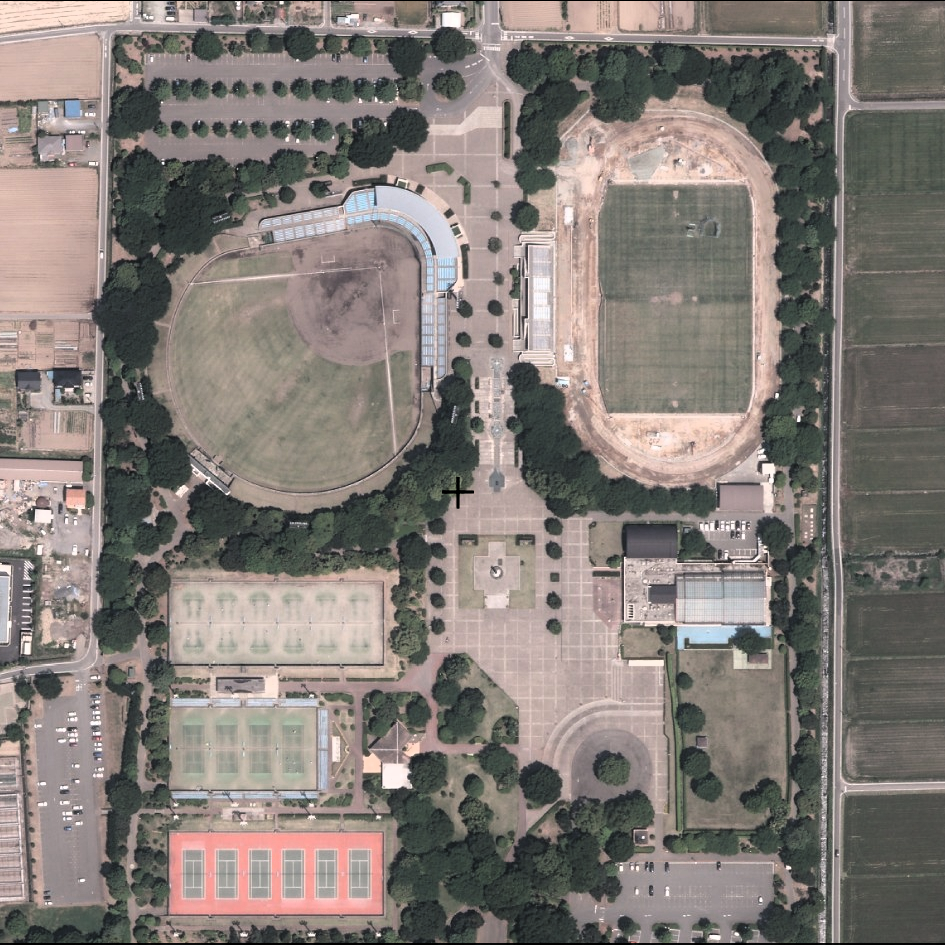
- Interactive map of Maebashi Athletic Stadium
- Location: Maebashi, Gunma, Japan
- Coordinates: 36°22′42.1″N 139°9′42.8″E
- Owner: Maebashi City
- Capacity: 1,100

Tenant
- Tonan Maebashi

Maebashi Athletic Stadium (前橋総合運動公園陸上競技・サッカー場, Maebashi Sōgō-undō-kōen Rikujōkyōgijō ・ sakkājō) is a combined athletic and football stadium in Maebashi, Gunma, Japan.

Since 2013, it has been the home of Tonan Maebashi.
