= International Pacific University =

Private university in Okayama, Japan

- 環太平洋大学
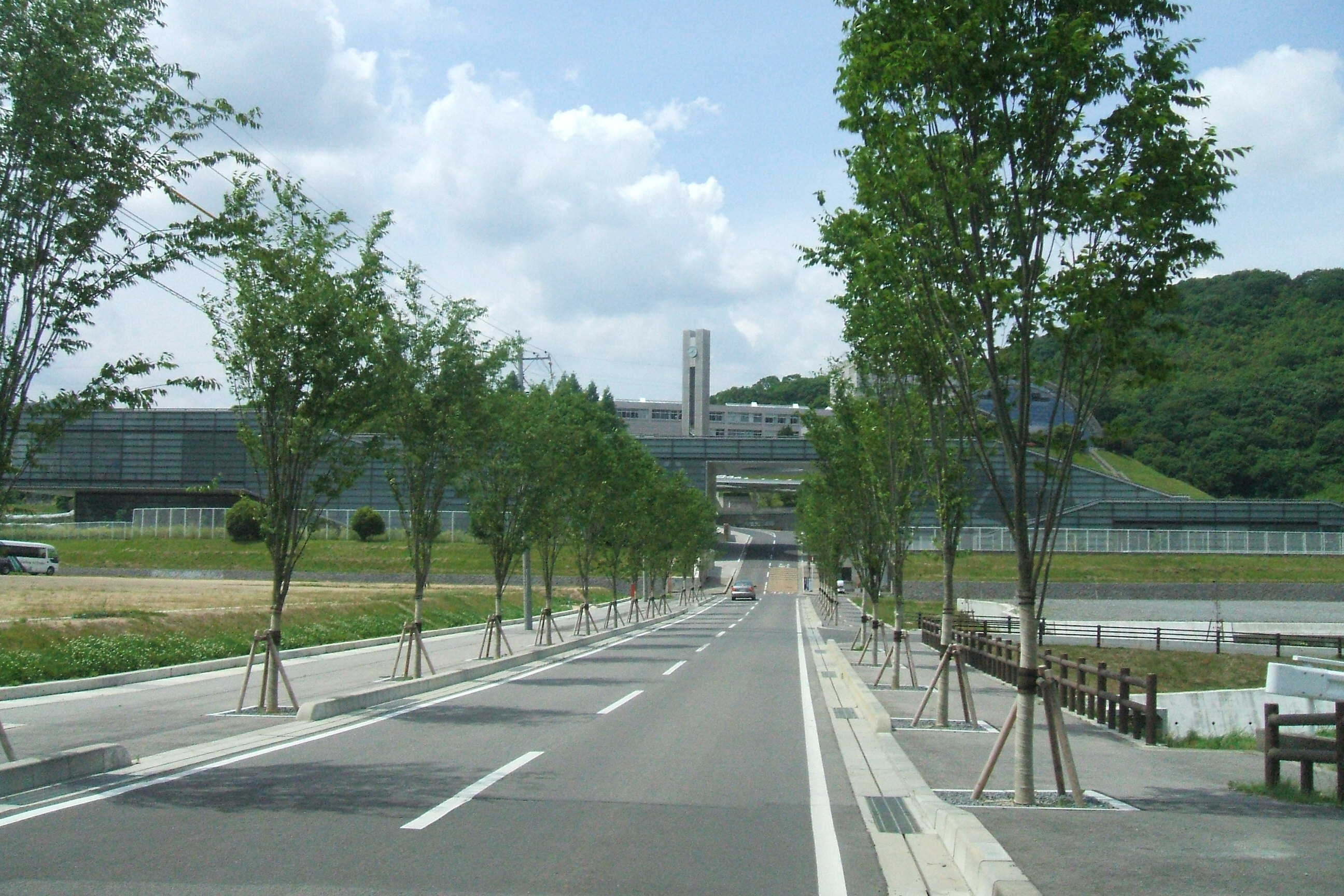
- International Pacific University
- Type: Private university
- Established: 2007
- Location: Okayama, Okayama Prefecture, Japan
- Campus: Campus 1 34°43′45.6″N 134°0′39.7″E Campus 2 34°42′30.8″N 133°59′22.1″E
- Website: https://ipu-japan.ac.jp/ (in Japanese) https://ipu-japan.ac.jp/english/ (in English)

International Pacific University (環太平洋大学, Kan Taiheiyō Daigaku) is a private university in Higashi-ku, Okayama, Japan, established in 2007.
