= Yusei Toshida =

Japanese footballer (born 1999)

Yusei Toshida 土信田 悠生
Personal information
- Full name: Yusei Toshida
- Date of birth: 23 July 1999 (age 27)
- Place of birth: Shūnan, Yamaguchi, Japan
- Height: 1.82 m (6 ft 0 in)
- Position: Forward

Team information
- Current team: Gamba Osaka
- Number: 41

Youth career
- 2006–2011: Toishi SC
- 2012–2014: Shuyo Junior High School
- 2015–2017: Takagawa Gakuen High School

College career
Years	Team	Apps	(Gls)
2018–2021	Komazawa University		

Senior career*
Years	Team	Apps	(Gls)
2022–2023	Roasso Kumamoto	48	(2)
2024–2025	Zweigen Kanazawa	55	(14)
2026	Tegevajaro Miyazaki	24	(10)
2026–	Gamba Osaka	3	(0)
- * Club domestic league appearances and goals as of 13:39, 12 October 2026 (UTC)

Yusei Toshida (土信田 悠生, Toshida Yusei; born 23 July 1999) is a Japanese footballer currently playing as a forward for J1 League club Gamba Osaka.

== Career statistics ==
=== Club ===
As of 12 October 2026.

Appearances and goals by club, season and competition
Club	Season	League			National cup (Note: Includes Emperor's Cup)		League cup (Note: Includes J.League Cup)		Continental		Other		Total	
Club	Season	Division	Apps	Goals	Apps	Goals	Apps	Goals	Apps	Goals	Apps	Goals	Apps	Goals
Komazawa University	2018	–			1	0	–		–		–		1	0
Roasso Kumamoto	2022	J2 League	32	1	2	0	–		–		1 (Note: Appearance in J1/J2 play-offs)	0	35	1
Roasso Kumamoto	2023	J2 League	16	1	0	0	–		–		0	0	16	1
Roasso Kumamoto	Total		48	2	2	0	0	0	0	0	1	0	51	2
Zweigen Kanazawa	2024	J3 League	17	2	1	0	0	0	–		0	0	18	2
Zweigen Kanazawa	2025	J3 League	38	12	2	2	1	0	–		1 (Note: Appearance in J2/J3 play-offs)	0	42	14
Zweigen Kanazawa	Total		55	14	3	2	1	0	0	0	1	0	60	16
Tegevajaro Miyazaki	2026	J2/J3 (100)	19	9	–		–		–		–		19	9
Tegevajaro Miyazaki	2026–27	J2 League	5	1	0	1	1	0	–		–		6	2
Tegevajaro Miyazaki	Total		24	10	0	1	1	0	0	0	0	0	25	11
Gamba Osaka	2026–27	J1 League	3	0	0	0	0	0	1 (Note: Appearances in AFC Champions League Elite)	1	–		4	1
Career total			130	26	6	3	2	0	1	1	2	0	141	30
