= Kyo Sato =

Japanese footballer

Personal information
- Date of birth: 21 March 2000 (age 26)
- Place of birth: Tochigi, Japan
- Height: 1.68 m (5 ft 6 in)
- Position: Winger

Team information
- Current team: Kyoto Sanga FC
- Number: 44

Youth career
- 2012–2014: Verdy SS Oyama
- 2015–2017: Mito Keimei High School

College career
Years	Team	Apps	(Gls)
2018–2021	Ryutsu Keizai University		

Senior career*
Years	Team	Apps	(Gls)
2018	Ryutsu Keizai University FC	4	(1)
2022–2023	Sagan Tosu	4	(0)
2022	→ Kyoto Sanga FC (loan)	6	(0)
2023–	Kyoto Sanga FC	114	(2)
- * Club domestic league appearances and goals as of 1 August 2026

Kyo Sato (佐藤 響, Sato Kyo; born 21 March 2000) is a Japanese footballer currently playing as a winger for Kyoto Sanga FC.

== Career statistics ==
=== Club ===
As of 9 July 2022.

Club	Season	League			National Cup		League Cup		Other		Total	
Club	Season	Division	Apps	Goals	Apps	Goals	Apps	Goals	Apps	Goals	Apps	Goals
Ryutsu Keizai University FC	2018	Kantō Soccer League	4	1	0	0	–		0	0	4	1
Ryutsu Keizai University	2019	–			1 (Note: Appearances in the Emperor's Cup)	0	–		0	0	1	0
Ryutsu Keizai University	2021	–			1	0	–		0	0	1	0
Ryutsu Keizai University	Total		0	0	2	0	0	0	0	0	2	0
Sagan Tosu	2022	J1 League	4	0	1	0	5	0	0	0	4	0
Career total			8	1	3	0	5	0	0	0	16	1
