= Biwako Seikei Sport College =

Coordinates: 35°13′41.4″N 135°56′50.6″E

- びわこ成蹊スポーツ大学
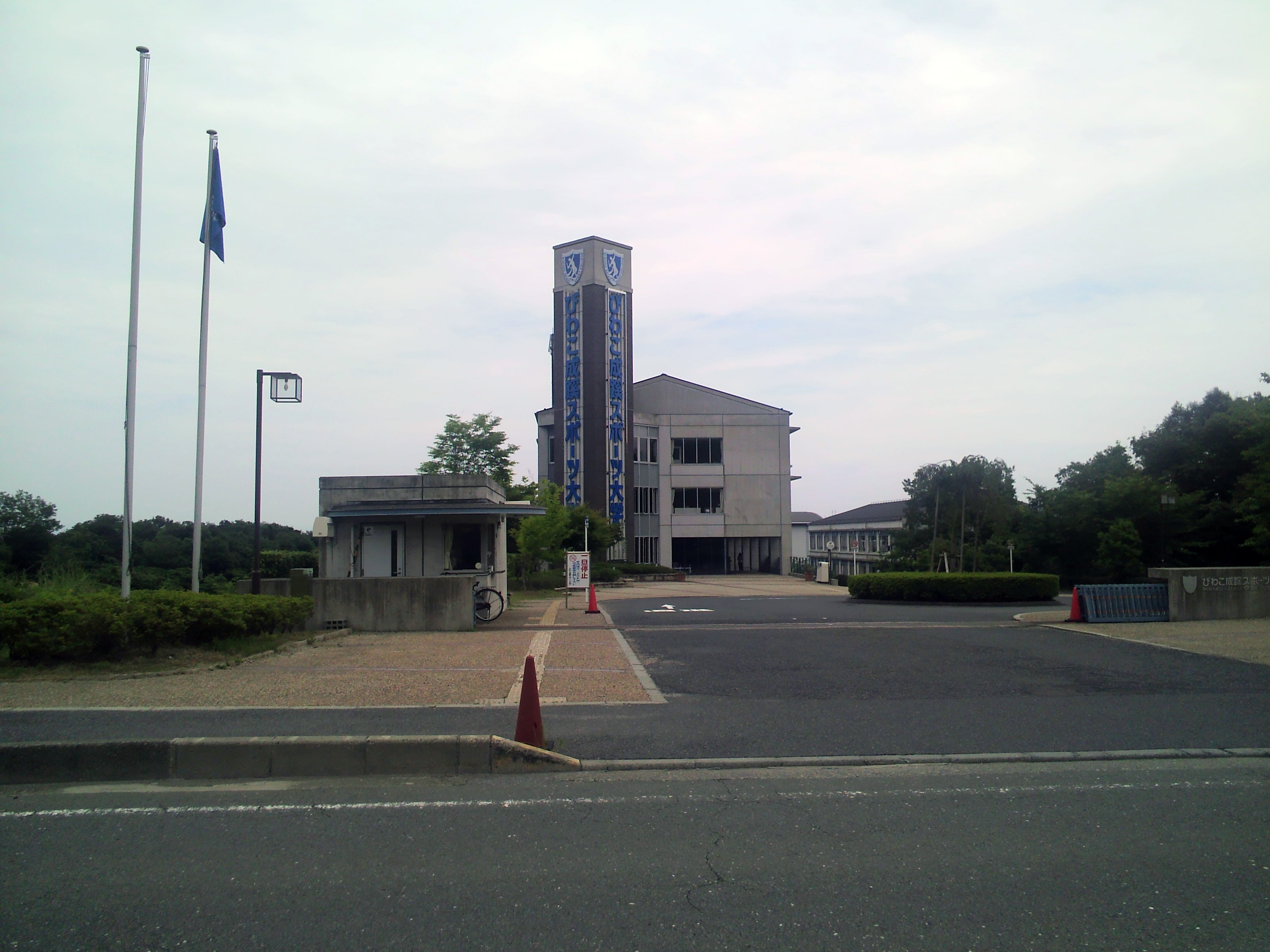
- Biwako Seikei Sport College
- Established: 2003

Biwako Seikei Sport College (びわこ成蹊スポーツ大学, Biwako seikei spōtsu daigaku) is a private university in Otsu, Shiga, Japan, established in 2003.

== Notable alumni ==
- Ai Aoki (synchronised swimmer)
- Tetsuya Funatsu - football player
- Kai Hirano - football player
- Shota Imai - football player
- Naoki Inoue (footballer)
- Gakuto Kondo - football player
- Riki Matsuda - football player
- Riku Matsuda - football player
- Keisuke Takabatake - basketball player
- Takashi Uchino - football player
- Naoyuki Yamada - football player
