= Toin University of Yokohama =

University in Yokohama, Japan

Coordinates: 35.565935°N 139.517955°E

- 桐蔭横浜大学; Tōin yokohama daigaku
- Type: Private
- Established: 1988
- Location: Aoba-ku, Yokohama, Kanagawa, Japan
- Website: toin.ac.jp/univ

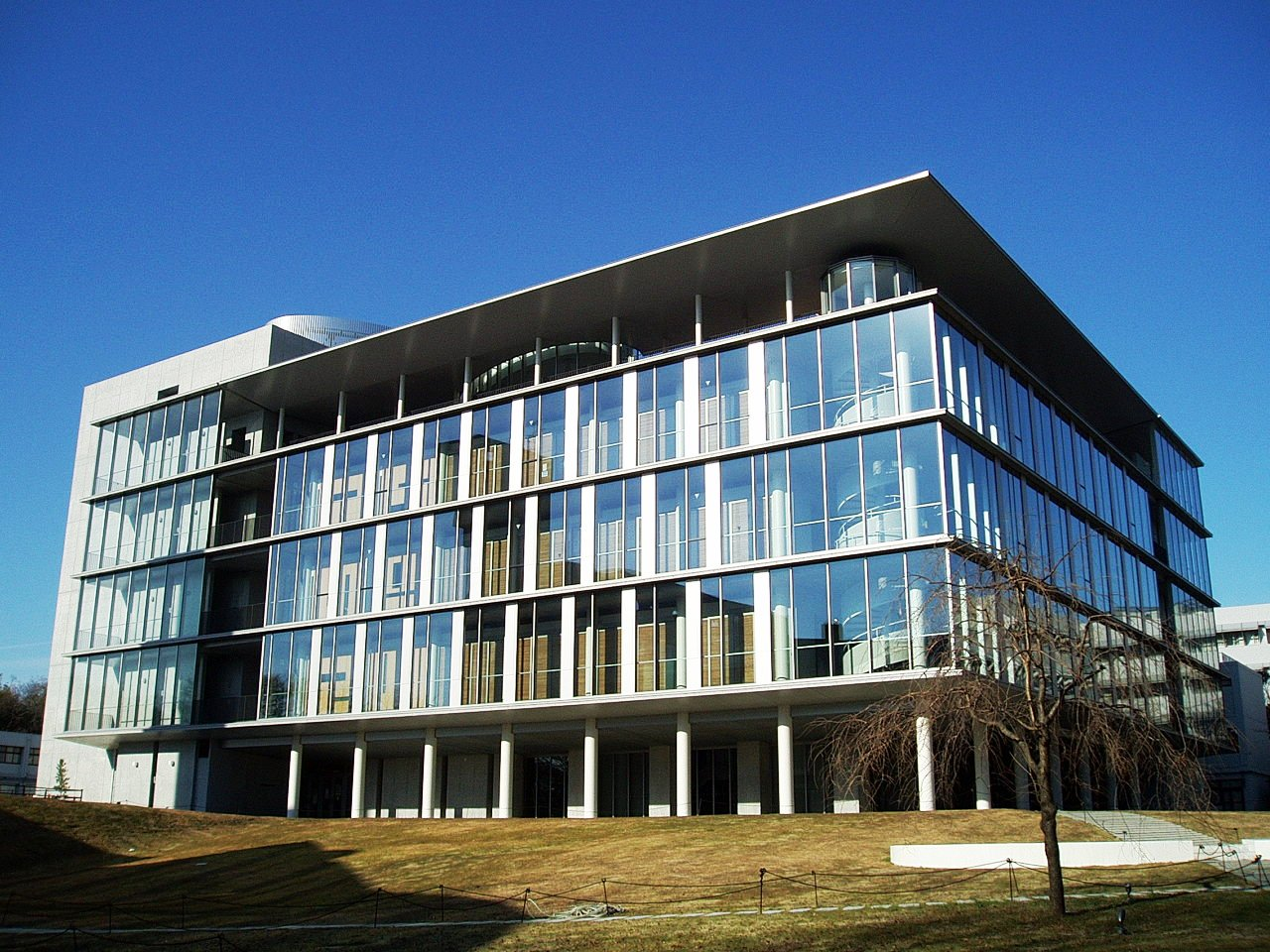
University Central Building

Toin University of Yokohama (桐蔭横浜大学, Tōin yokohama daigaku) is a private university in Aoba-ku, Yokohama, Kanagawa prefecture, Japan.

Toin University of Yokohama was established in 1988. It offers degree programs in sports medicine, medical technology, engineering and law.
