= Hannan University =

Coordinates: 34°35′33″N 135°32′8″E

- Type: Private
- Established: 1965
- Undergraduates: 5,081
- Postgraduates: 35
- Location: Osaka, Japan
- Website: Official website

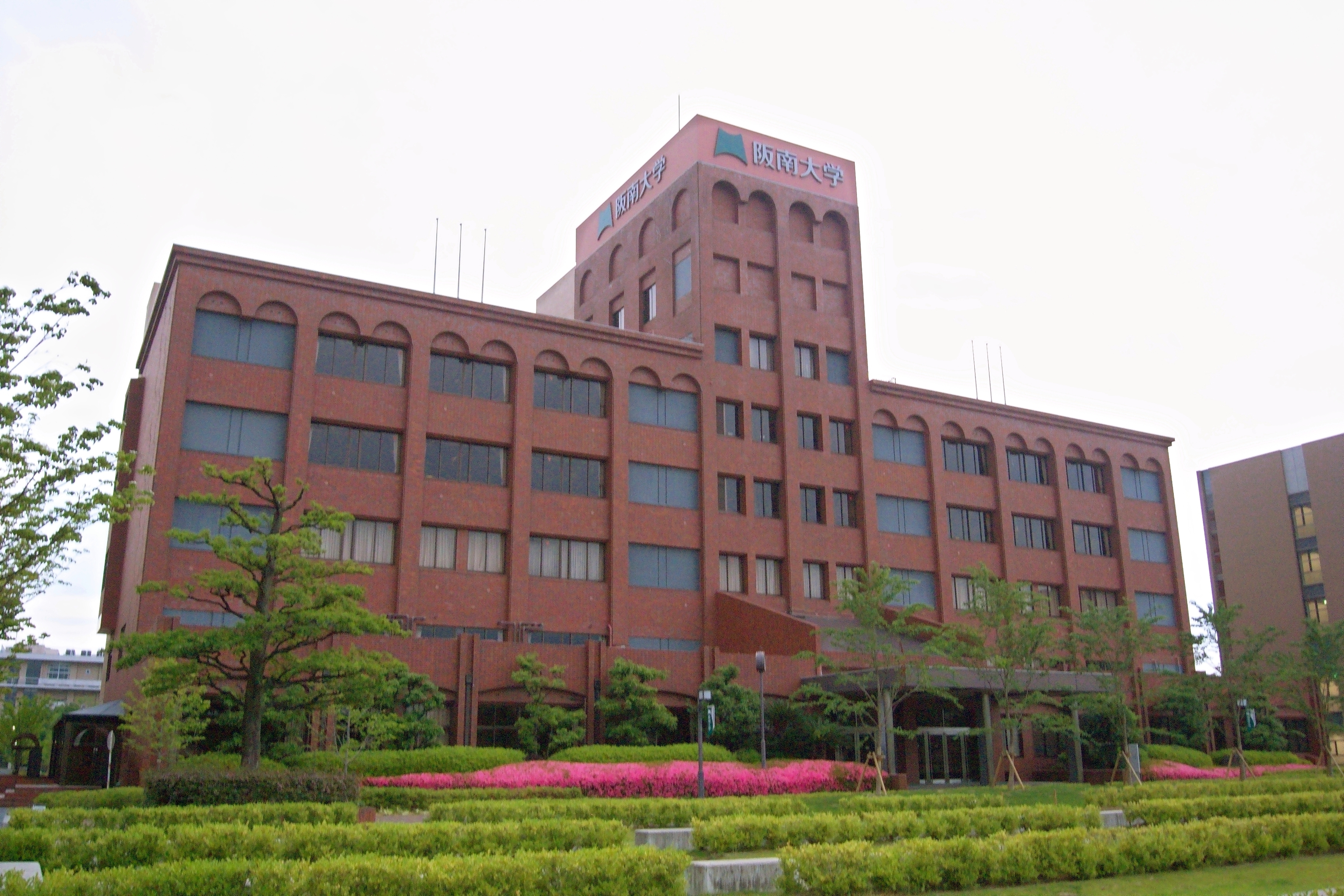
Bldg. #6

Hannan University (阪南大学, Hannan Daigaku) is a private university in Matsubara, Osaka, Japan. It was founded in 1965.
