= National Institute of Fitness and Sports in Kanoya =

University in Kagoshima Prefecture, Japan

Coordinates: 31°23′42″N 130°47′11″E

- 鹿屋体育大学
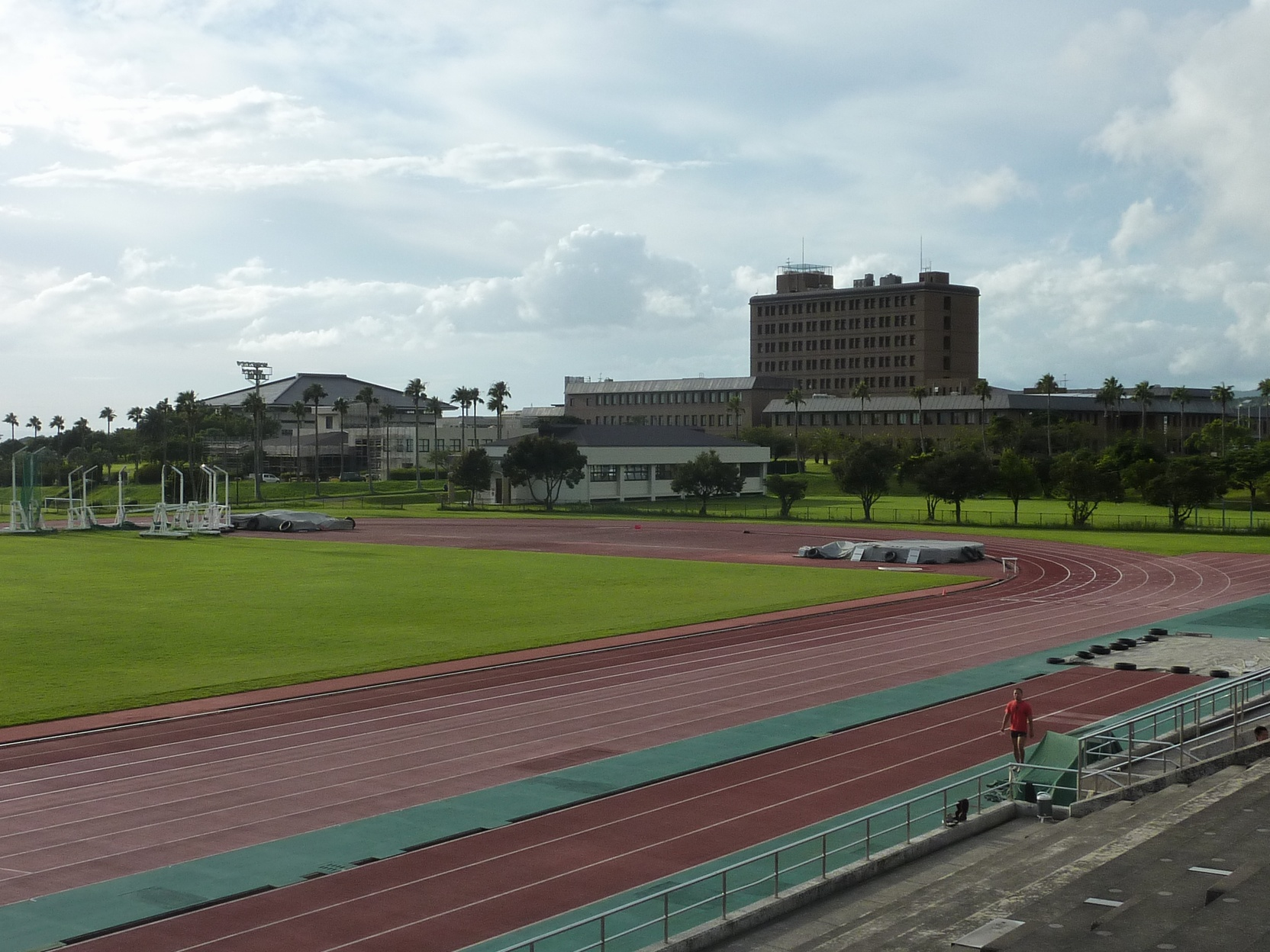
- National Institute of Fitness and Sports in Kanoya
- Type: National
- Established: 1981
- President: Masao Matsushita
- Undergraduates: 769
- Postgraduates: 35
- Doctoral students: 38
- Location: Shiromizu-cho 1, Kanoya City, Kagoshima Prefecture, Japan 891 2393
- Website: www.nifs-k.ac.jp/en/index.html

National Institute of Fitness and Sports in Kanoya (鹿屋体育大学, Kanoya Taiiku Daigaku) is a national university in Kanoya, Kagoshima, Japan, founded in 1981.

Four alumni participated in the swimming and volleyball events in the Beijing Olympics, including Athens Olympics swimming gold medalist Ai Shibata.

Four players participated by swimming and a bicycle also the London Olympic Games.

== Alumnus ==
- Ai Shibata
- Noriyuki Sugasawa
