= Niigata University of Health and Welfare =

Private university in Niigata, Japan

Coordinates: 37°57′56″N 139°11′12″E

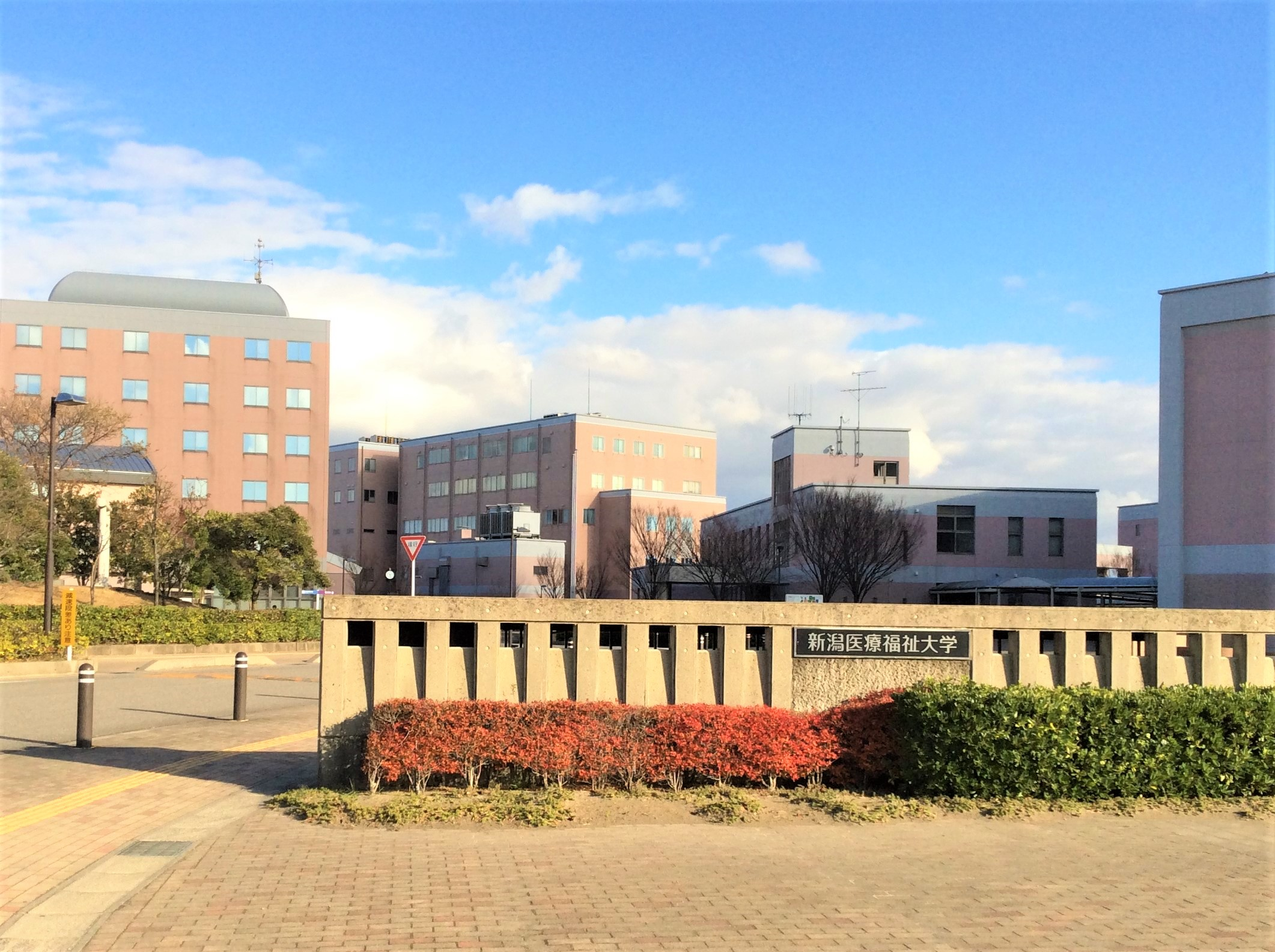
Niigata University of Health and Welfare

Niigata University of Health and Welfare (新潟医療福祉大学, Niigata iryō fukushi daigaku) is a private university in Niigata, Japan. It was established in 2001.
