= 2024 Emperor's Cup =

Tournament details
- Country: Japan
- Dates: 25 May – 23 November
- Teams: 88

Final positions
- Champions: Vissel Kobe (2nd title)
- Runners-up: Gamba Osaka
- Champions League Elite: Vissel Kobe

Tournament statistics
- Matches played: 87
- Goals scored: 301 (3.46 per match)
- Attendance: 288,919 (3,321 per match)
- Top goal scorer(s): Riku Gunji; Juanma; Daiju Sasaki (4 goals)

The 2024 Emperor's Cup or the JFA 104th Japan Football Championship (Japanese: 天皇杯 JFA 第104回全日本サッカー選手権大会) was the 104th edition of the annually known contested cup. As usual it featured 88 teams representing the prefectural football associations, university football federation, J1 League, J2 League and Japan Football League. The winner qualified to the group stage of the 2025–26 AFC Champions League Elite.

Kawasaki Frontale were the defending champions, winning the 2023 final on penalties against Kashiwa Reysol.

On 19 September 2023, it was announced by JFA that Urawa Red Diamonds was banned from participating in this tournament following supporters clash after a 0–3 loss against Nagoya Grampus in the 4th round of the previous year's edition. For this reason, instead of one, two specially designated amateur clubs were designated by JFA, being them 2023 Japan Football League champions Honda FC and 2023 University Championship winners Meiji University. Both teams were given a bye from prefectural qualifications, as usual.

== Calendar ==
The schedule for the first round to the quarter-finals was announced on 15 December 2023 in JFA's 12th Board of Directors meeting.

Round	Date	Backup date(s)	Matches	Clubs	New entries this round
First round	25–26 May	29 May	24	48 (47+1) → 24	1 specially designated team; 47 prefectural qualification cup winners
Second round	12 June	19 June	32	64 (24+20+19+1) → 32	19 2024 J1 League clubs; 20 2024 J2 League clubs; 1 specially designated team
Third round	10 July	17 July	16	32 → 16	None
Round of 16	21 August	28 August	8	16 → 8	None
Quarter-finals	18 September	11 and 25 September	4	8 → 4	None
Semi-finals	27 October	–	2	4 → 2	None
Final	23 November	–	1	2 → 1	None

== Qualifying rounds ==
As only J1 and J2 League clubs qualify directly for the first round, teams from outside of it who wants to qualify to the Emperor's Cup (exception being made to the JFA-seeded team), have to undergo a prefectural qualification, with regulations and schedules varying from one association to another. In total, there are 47 prefectural cup qualifications, with the winners of each prefectural cup earning their right to play in the Emperor's Cup, with all of them assigned to start the competition in the first round.

In bold, it's displayed the teams that won each final, and not necessarily the home team.

12 May Hokkaido Final	**Hokkaido Tokachi Sky Earth**	**1–0**	Hokkaido UE Iwamizawa	Nakasatsunai
13:00 JST				Stadium: Nakasatsunai Exchange Forest Football Field

12 May Aomori Final	**Vanraure Hachinohe**	**2–0**	Blancdieu Hirosaki	Hachinohe
13:00 JST				Stadium: Prifoods Stadium

12 May Iwate Final	**Iwate Grulla Morioka**	**3–0**	Fuji University	Morioka
14:00 JST				Stadium: Iwagin Stadium

12 May Miyagi Final	**Sony Sendai**	**2–1**	Cobaltore Onagawa	Rifu
13:00 JST				Stadium: Miyagi Co-op Megumino Soccer Field

14 April Akita Final	**Saruta Kōgyō**	**1–0**	North Asia University	Akita
09:30 JST				Stadium: Space Project Dream Field

7 April Yamagata Final	**Oyama SC**	**5–3**	Yamagata University	Yamagata
11:00 JST				Stadium: Yamagata Municipal Stadium

12 May Fukushima Final	**Fukushima United**	**7–0**	FC Primeiro Fukushima	Fukushima
13:00 JST				Stadium: Toho Stadium

12 May Ibaraki Final	**University of Tsukuba**	**2–1**	RKU Dragons Ryugasaki	Mito
13:00 JST				Stadium: K's denki Stadium Mito

12 May Tochigi Final	**Tochigi City**	**0–0** (a.e.t.) (**10–9** p)	Vertfee Yaita	Utsunomiya
13:00 JST				Stadium: Tochigi Green Stadium

12 May Gunma Final	**Tonan Maebashi**	**2–1**	Jobu University	Maebashi
09:30 JST				Stadium: Earth Care Gunma Shikishima Football Stadium

11 May Saitama Final	**Omiya Ardija**	**1–0**	Tokyo International University FC	Saitama
14:00 JST				Stadium: NACK5 Stadium Omiya

20 April Chiba Final	**Briobecca Urayasu**	**1–0**	Vonds Ichihara	Narashino
13:00 JST				Stadium: Daiichi Cutter Field

11 May Tokyo Final	**Yokogawa Musashino**	**1–1** (**5–4** p)	Nihon University	Kita
14:00 JST				Stadium: Ajinomoto Field Nishigaoka

12 May Kanagawa Final	**SC Sagamihara**	**5–0**	Toin University of Yokohama	Yokohama
13:00 JST				Stadium: NHK Spring Mitsuzawa Football Stadium

5 May Yamanashi Final	**YGU Pegasus**	**3–2**	Nirasaki Astros	Kofu
10:00 JST				Stadium: JIT Recycle Ink Stadium

12 May Nagano Final	**Nagano Parceiro**	**1–1** (a.e.t.) (**4–3** p)	Matsumoto Yamaga	Matsumoto
14:00 JST				Stadium: Sunpro Alwin

5 May Niigata Final	**Japan Soccer College**	**2–1**	Niigata University HW	Shibata
13:00 JST				Stadium: Green Stadium Shibata

12 May Toyama Final	**Kataller Toyama**	**2–0**	Toyama Shinjo	Toyama
13:00 JST				Stadium: Toyama Stadium

12 May Ishikawa Final	**Zweigen Kanazawa**	**6–1**	Kanazawa Seiryo University	Kanazawa
13:00 JST				Stadium: Kanazawa Go Go Curry Stadium

12 May Fukui Final	**Fukui United**	**5–0**	Sakai Phoenix	Sakai
13:00 JST				Stadium: Technoport Fukui Stadium

12 May Shizuoka Final	**Azul Claro Numazu**	**2–0**	Tokoha University	Numazu
14:00 JST				Stadium: Ashitaka Park Stadium

11 May Aichi Final	**Chukyo University**	**3–2**	Maruyasu Okazaki	Nisshin
13:00 JST				Stadium: Korogi Sports Park

12 May Mie Final	**Veertien Mie**	**3–1**	Atletico Suzuka	Suzuka
12:10 JST				Stadium: Mie Suzuka Sports Garden

11 May Gifu Final	**FC Gifu**	**5–0**	FC Bombonera	Gifu
13:00 JST				Stadium: Gifu Nagaragawa Meadow

11 May Shiga Final	**Biwako Seikei Sport College**	**2–1** (a.e.t.)	Reilac Shiga	Kusatsu
13:00 JST				Stadium: Nunobiki Green Stadium

12 May Kyoto Final	**Kyoto Sangyo University**	**4–0**	Ococias Kyoto	Kyoto
13:00 JST				Stadium: Takebishi Stadium Kyoto

12 May Osaka Final	**Kansai University**	**2–1**	Momoyama Gakuin University	Sakai
13:00 JST				Stadium: J-Green Sakai

12 May Hyogo Final	**Konan University**	**2–2** (a.e.t.) (**8–7** p)	Kwansei Gakuin University	Sumoto
14:00 JST				Stadium: ASPA Goshikidai Sports Park

12 May Nara Final	**Nara Club**	**1–0**	Asuka FC	Kashihara
13:00 JST				Stadium: Kashihara Park

12 May Wakayama Final	**Arterivo Wakayama**	**9–0**	Wakayama Kihoku Shukyudan	Wakayama
11:00 JST				Stadium: Kimiidera Athletic Stadium

21 April Tottori Final	**Gainare Tottori**	**3–2**	Yonago Genki SC	Yonago
12:00 JST				Stadium: All Gainare Yajin Stadium

21 April Shimane Final	**Belugarosso Iwami**	**3–0**	SC Matsue	Masuda
13:00 JST				Stadium: Shimane Football Arena

21 April Okayama Final	**Mitsubishi Mizushima**	**2–0**	International Pacific University	Okayama
13:00 JST				Stadium: City Light Stadium

21 April Hiroshima Final	**Fukuyama City**	**4–0**	Hiroshima University of Economics	Hiroshima
13:00 JST				Stadium: Edion Peace Wing Hiroshima

21 April Yamaguchi Final	**Baleine Shimonoseki**	**3–0**	Shunan University	Shimonoseki
10:30 JST				Stadium: Nogihama Park

12 May Kagawa Final	**Kamatamare Sanuki**	**3–2**	Takamatsu University	Takamatsu
13:00 JST				Stadium: Kagawa Prefectural Soccer/Rugby Field

5 May Tokushima Final	**FC Tokushima**	**4–0**	NJ FC	Tokushima
14:30 JST				Stadium: Tokushima City Ball Stadium

12 May Ehime Final	**FC Imabari**	**6–1**	Lvnirosso NC	Matsuyama
13:00 JST				Stadium: Ehime Sports Park Athletic Stadium

12 May Kochi Final	**Kochi United**	**5–0**	KUFC Nankoku	Haruno
13:00 JST				Stadium: Kochi Haruno Athletic Stadium

12 May Fukuoka Final	**Giravanz Kitakyushu**	**4–0**	Fukuoka University	Fukuoka
13:00 JST				Stadium: Best Denki Stadium

12 May Saga Final	**Kawasoe Club**	**0–0** (a.e.t.) (**4–3** p)	Brew Kashima	Ogi
11:00 JST				Stadium: Black Monblanc Football Center

11 May Nagasaki Final	**Mitsubishi Nagasaki SC**	**1–0**	Nagasaki Wesleyan University	Isahaya
13:00 JST				Stadium: Transcosmos Stadium Nagasaki

12 May Kumamoto Final	**Tokai University Kumamoto**	**1–1** (a.e.t.) (**4–2** p)	Kumamoto Gakuen University	Kumamoto
10:00 JST				Stadium: Kumamoto Suizenji Stadium

12 May Oita Final	**J-Lease FC**	**2–0**	Verspah Oita	Oita
12:00 JST				Stadium: Resonac Soccer and Rugby Field

12 May Miyazaki Final	**Tegevajaro Miyazaki**	**2–0**	Veroskronos Tsuno	Miyazaki
13:00 JST				Stadium: Ikimenomori Sports Park Athletic Field

12 May Kagoshima Final	**NIFS Kanoya**	**6–0**	NIFS Kanoya FC	Kagoshima
11:00 JST				Stadium: Kagoshima Prefectural Soccer and Rugby Field

12 May Okinawa Final	**Okinawa SV**	**1–0**	FC Ryukyu	Nanjo
13:00 JST				Stadium: Nanjo City Athletic Field

== Participating clubs ==
=== J1 League ===
All teams playing in the 2024 J1 League (except Urawa Red Diamonds, who were disqualified) join in the second round.

Club	Apps.	Prefecture
Hokkaido Consadole Sapporo	43rd	Hokkaido
Kashima Antlers	40th	Ibaraki
Kashiwa Reysol	56th	Chiba
FC Tokyo	30th	Tokyo
Tokyo Verdy	49th	Tokyo
Machida Zelvia	12th	Tokyo
Kawasaki Frontale	41st	Kanagawa
Yokohama F. Marinos	46th	Kanagawa
Shonan Bellmare	52nd	Kanagawa
Albirex Niigata	32nd	Niigata

Club	Apps.	Prefecture
Júbilo Iwata	47th	Shizuoka
Nagoya Grampus	47th	Aichi
Kyoto Sanga	41st	Kyoto
Gamba Osaka	44th	Osaka
Cerezo Osaka	55th	Osaka
Vissel Kobe	37th	Hyogo
Sanfrecce Hiroshima	72nd	Hiroshima
Avispa Fukuoka	32nd	Fukuoka
Sagan Tosu	32nd	Saga

=== J2 League ===
All 20 teams playing in the 2024 J2 League join in the second round.

Club	Apps.	Prefecture
Vegalta Sendai	30th	Miyagi
Blaublitz Akita	31st	Akita
Montedio Yamagata	32nd	Yamagata
Iwaki FC	7th	Fukushima
Mito HollyHock	28th	Ibaraki
Tochigi SC	24th	Tochigi
Thespa Gunma	21st	Gunma
JEF United Chiba	59th	Chiba
Yokohama FC	25th	Kanagawa
Ventforet Kofu	32nd	Yamanashi

Club	Apps.	Prefecture
Shimizu S-Pulse	32nd	Shizuoka
Fujieda MYFC	6th	Shizuoka
Fagiano Okayama	16th	Okayama
Renofa Yamaguchi	20th	Yamaguchi
Tokushima Vortis	36th	Tokushima
Ehime FC	22nd	Ehime
V-Varen Nagasaki	17th	Nagasaki
Roasso Kumamoto	24th	Kumamoto
Oita Trinita	28th	Oita
Kagoshima United	10th	Kagoshima

=== Amateur Designated Teams ===
Urawa Red Diamonds, as a J1 club, would be automatically assigned to the second round. As they were excluded from this year's cup, 2023 Japan Football League winners Honda FC filled the automatic entry slots for the second round. Another team was then, needed to fill the automatic entry slots of the first round. JFA assigned for this slot the 2023 University Championship winners, Meiji University.

Meiji University is the last university team to be awarded a direct entry since Osaka University of Health and Sport Sciences, who were specially designated to the 2011 Emperor's Cup. Until 2011, it was an annual practice by JFA to give an automatic entry to Prime Minister's Cup champions.

Team	Prefecture	League	L.	Apps.
Meiji University	Tokyo	Kanto University League D1	UL1	15th
Honda FC	Shizuoka	Japan Football League	4	44th

=== Prefectural Representatives ===
All the 47 prefectural tournaments winners (prefectural representatives) joins in the first round.

Prefecture	Team	League	L.	Apps.
Hokkaido	Hokkaido Tokachi Sky Earth	Hokkaido Soccer League	5	2nd
Aomori	Vanraure Hachinohe	J3 League	3	12th
Iwate	Iwate Grulla Morioka	J3 League	3	12th
Miyagi	Sony Sendai	Japan Football League	4	25th
Akita	Saruta Kogyo	Tohoku Soccer League D2 North	6	3rd
Yamagata	Oyama SC	Tohoku Soccer League D2 South	6	3rd
Fukushima	Fukushima United	J3 League	3	12th
Ibaraki	University of Tsukuba	Kanto University League D1	UL1	34th
Tochigi	Tochigi City	Japan Football League	4	14th
Gunma	Tonan Maebashi	Kanto Soccer League D2	6	8th
Saitama	Omiya Ardija	J3 League	3	29th
Chiba	Briobecca Urayasu	Japan Football League	4	7th
Tokyo	Yokogawa Musashino	Japan Football League	4	6th
Kanagawa	SC Sagamihara	J3 League	3	3rd
Yamanashi	Yamanashi Gakuin University Pegasus	Yamanashi Football League	7	6th
Nagano	Nagano Parceiro	J3 League	3	12th
Niigata	Japan Soccer College	Hokushinetsu Football League D1	5	14th
Toyama	Kataller Toyama	J3 League	3	15th
Ishikawa	Zweigen Kanazawa	J3 League	3	20th
Fukui	Fukui United	Hokushinetsu Football League D1	5	16th
Shizuoka	Azul Claro Numazu	J3 League	3	3rd
Aichi	Chukyo University	Tokai University League D1	UL1	8th
Mie	Veertien Mie	Japan Football League	4	4th
Gifu	FC Gifu	J3 League	3	18th
Shiga	Biwako Seikei Sport College	Kansai University League D1	UL1	7th
Kyoto	Kyoto Sangyo University	Kansai University League D1	UL1	6th
Osaka	Kansai University	Kansai University League D1	UL1	19th
Hyogo	Konan University	Kansai University League D1	UL1	2nd
Nara	Nara Club	J3 League	3	15th
Wakayama	Arterivo Wakayama	Kansai Soccer League D1	5	16th
Tottori	Gainare Tottori	J3 League	3	26th
Shimane	Belugarosso Iwami	Chugoku Soccer League	5	3rd
Okayama	Mitsubishi Mizushima	Chugoku Soccer League	5	16th
Hiroshima	Fukuyama City	Chugoku Soccer League	5	4th
Yamaguchi	Baleine Shimonoseki	Chugoku Soccer League	5	4th
Kagawa	Kamatamare Sanuki	J3 League	3	24th
Tokushima	FC Tokushima	Shikoku Soccer League	5	9th
Ehime	FC Imabari	J3 League	3	12th
Kochi	Kochi United	Japan Football League	4	9th
Fukuoka	Giravanz Kitakyushu	J3 League	3	15th
Saga	Kawasoe Club	Kyushu Soccer League	5	4th
Nagasaki	Mitsubishi Nagasaki SC	Nagasaki Football League	7	11th
Kumamoto	Tokai University Kumamoto	Kyushu University League D1	UL1	5th
Oita	J-Lease FC	Kyushu Soccer League	5	1st
Miyazaki	Tegevajaro Miyazaki	J3 League	3	4th
Kagoshima	NIFS Kanoya	Kyushu University League D1	UL1	13th
Okinawa	Okinawa SV	Japan Football League	4	5th

- Note: In the sections below, club tiers (league levels) are presented as follows:
  - National: (1): J1 League; (2): J2 League; (3): J3 League; (4): Japan Football League
  - Regional (senior): (5): Regional Leagues 1st Divs.; (6): Regional Leagues 2nd Divs.
    - Regional (university): (UL): University Regional Leagues
  - Prefectural (senior): (7): Prefectural Leagues 1st Divs.
  - Others (7+): Below the cited club tiers, unknown or not affiliated with any league.

== Schedule ==
On 12 March 2024, the JFA announced the schedule from the first to the third round.

=== First round ===
Number of teams per tier in this round
J3 League (3)	Japan Football League (4)	Regional 1st Divs. (5)	Regional 2nd Divs. (6)	Prefectural leagues (7)	University Leagues (UL)	Total
16 / 16	7 / 7	11 / 11	3 / 3	2 / 2	9 / 9	48 / 88

26 May Match 1	Kataller Toyama (3)	3–0	(UL) Kansai University	Takaoka
13:00	Nishiya 23'; Sasaki 27'; Takahashi 87'	Report		Stadium: Takaoka Sports Core; Attendance: 1,575; Referee: Koki Yasukawa

26 May Match 2	Iwate Grulla Morioka (3)	3–1	(5) Hokkaido Tokachi Sky Earth	Morioka
13:00	Niizato 10'; Fukagawa 23'; Tokura 52'	Report	Yoshida 47'	Stadium: Iwagin Stadium; Attendance: 644; Referee: Masakazu Kato

26 May Match 3	University of Tsukuba (UL)	1–0	(UL) Meiji University	Mito
13:00	Ikegaya 75'	Report		Stadium: K's denki Stadium Mito; Attendance: 743; Referee: Kiyoto Takeuchi

26 May Match 4	FC Tokushima (5)	0–1 (a.e.t.)	(5) J-Lease FC	Naruto
13:00		Report	Hattanda 102'	Stadium: Pocarisweat Stadium; Attendance: 365; Referee: Shohei Ofuji

26 May Match 5	NIFS Kanoya (UL)	0–3	(3) Giravanz Kitakyushu	Minamisatsuma
13:00		Report	Hirayama 16'; Ushinohama 27', 37'	Stadium: Osako Yuya Stadium; Attendance: 414; Referee: Hiroki Murata

26 May Match 6	Mitsubishi Mizushima (5)	3–4 (a.e.t.)	(3) Kamatamare Sanuki	Fukuyama
13:00	Miyazawa 42'; Tsunashima 48', 120+1'	Report	Akahoshi 60', 83'; Yoshida 97'; Kawanishi 107'	Stadium: Fukuyama Tsuun Rose Stadium; Attendance: 547; Referee: Takeshi Tsukahara

25 May Match 7	Nara Club (3)	3–2	(UL) Kyoto Sangyo University	Nara
13:00	Nishida 34'; Own goal 52' (o.g.); Suzuki 90+1'	Report	Suetani 3'; Kanno 33'	Stadium: Rohto Field Nara; Attendance: 473; Referee: Yoshihito Hori

26 May Match 8	Kochi United (4)	1–0	(5) Belugarosso Iwami	Kochi
13:00	Toya 36'	Report		Stadium: Kochi Haruno Sports Park Ball Game Stadium; Attendance: 462; Referee: Yuta Oho

26 May Match 9	Vanraure Hachinohe (3)	2–0	(4) Briobecca Urayasu	Hachinohe
13:00	Otoizumi 30'; Senoo 85'	Report		Stadium: Prifoods Stadium; Attendance: 693; Referee: Daichi Shiino

26 May Match 10	Arterivo Wakayama (5)	1–2	(5) Japan Soccer College	Wakayama
13:00	Kokubo 58'	Report	Ono 33'; Honda 42'	Stadium: Kimiidera Athletic Stadium; Attendance: 472; Referee: Akinori Mashio

26 May Match 11	Fukui United (5)	0–3	(3) Omiya Ardija	Sakai
13:00		Report	Kojima 31'; Izumisawa 60'; Osawa 88'	Stadium: Technoport Fukui Stadium; Attendance: 943; Referee: Satoshi Itaya

25 May Match 12	Tokai University Kumamoto (UL)	0–4	(7) Mitsubishi Nagasaki	Kumamoto
13:00		Report	Hamamoto 20'; Kurihara 43'; Ihara 56'; Hirano 64'	Stadium: Kumamoto Suizenji Stadium; Attendance: 178; Referee: Sho Takagi

25 May Match 13	FC Gifu (3)	1–0	(3) Azul Claro Numazu	Gifu
13:00	Fujioka 64'	Report		Stadium: Gifu Nagaragawa Meadow; Attendance: 1,129; Referee: Shinya Sasaki

26 May Match 14	Fukushima United (3)	9–0	(6) Oyama SC	Hirono
13:00	Shimizu 11', 34', 83'; Kato 26'; Akiyama 39'; Yajima 42'; Awano 72'; Shiohama 84', 90+1'	Report		Stadium: J-Village Stadium; Attendance: 280; Referee: Kentaro Kobayashi

25 May Match 15	Tegevajaro Miyazaki (3)	4–0	(5) Kawasoe Club	Shintomi
13:00	Own goal 14' (o.g.); Hashimoto 28'; Ano 68'; Yoshizawa 90+3'	Report		Stadium: Ichigo Miyazaki Shintomi Football Stadium; Attendance: 347; Referee: Masaki Adachi

25 May Match 16	Sony Sendai (4)	3–1	(6) Tonan Maebashi	Rifu
13:00	Ito 83'; Nunokata 90'; Nakayama 90+2'	Report	Kim Tae-hee 42'	Stadium: Miyagi Co-op Megumino Soccer Field; Attendance: 218; Referee: Taku Nagaya

26 May Match 17	Veertien Mie (4)	1–0	(3) FC Imabari	Toin
13:00	Tamura 34'	Report		Stadium: La Pita Toin Stadium; Attendance: 642; Referee: Ryuhei Yamaguchi

26 May Match 18	Biwako Seikei Sport College (UL)	0–1	(UL) Chukyo University	Hikone
13:00		Report	Udo 16'	Stadium: Heiwado Hato Stadium; Attendance: 522; Referee: Masaaki Hiratsuka

26 May Match 19	Gainare Tottori (3)	1–1 (a.e.t.) (3–4 p)	(5) Baleine Shimonoseki	Tottori
13:00	Matsuki 80'	Report	Nomiyama 65'	Stadium: Axis Bird Stadium; Attendance: 660; Referee: Akifumi Kawakatsu
	Penalties
	Matsuki (penalty scored); Hasegawa (penalty missed); Miyata (penalty missed); Koizumi (penalty scored); Sakamoto (penalty scored)		(penalty scored) Nomiyama; (penalty scored) Toda; (penalty scored) Handa; (penalty missed) Harasaki; (penalty scored) Sato

25 May Match 20	Zweigen Kanazawa (3)	1–1 (a.e.t.) (3–4 p)	(UL) Konan University	Kanazawa
13:00	Shoji 9'	Report	Shimizu 62'	Stadium: Kanazawa Go Go Curry Stadium; Attendance: 1,271; Referee: Kenya Ohara
	Penalties
	Kajiura (penalty scored); Takashio (penalty scored); Okizaki (penalty scored); Inoue (penalty missed); Sugiura (penalty missed)		(penalty missed) Ariyoshi; (penalty scored) Hagiwara; (penalty scored) Okamoto; (penalty scored) Mori; (penalty scored) Toma

26 May Match 21	Nagano Parceiro (3)	7–0	(6) Saruta Kogyo	Matsumoto
13:00	Morikawa 29'; Sanda 38', 47'; Shin 42'; Fujimori 81'; Kihara 90+2', 90+3'	Report		Stadium: Sunpro Alwin; Attendance: 809; Referee: Yoshito Nakagawa

26 May Match 22	Fukuyama City (5)	3–0	(4) Okinawa SV	Hiroshima
13:00	Okubo 2'; Sugiura 10'; Nohama 76'	Report		Stadium: Edion Peace Wing Hiroshima; Attendance: 1,232; Referee: Yuki Tanabe

25 May Match 23	Tochigi City (4)	1–0	(4) Yokogawa Musashino	Utsunomiya
13:00	Suzuki 48'	Report		Stadium: Tochigi Green Stadium; Attendance: 357; Referee: Yuki Nishida

25 May Match 24	SC Sagamihara (3)	3–0	(7) YGU Pegasus	Hiratsuka
13:00	Fujinuma 14'; Makiyama 45+1'; Takagi 90+2'	Report		Stadium: Lemon Gas Stadium Hiratsuka; Attendance: 860; Referee: Ryo Munakata

=== Second round ===
Number of teams per tier in this round
J1 League (1)	J2 League (2)	J3 League (3)	Japan Football League (4)	Regional 1st divs. (5)	Prefectural leagues (7)	University Leagues (UL)	Total
19 / 19	20 / 20	12 / 16	5 / 7	4 / 11	1 / 2	3 / 9	64 / 88

12 June Match 25	Vissel Kobe (1)	2–0	(3) Kataller Toyama	Kobe
19:00	Miyashiro 15'; Jean Patric 60'	Report		Stadium: Noevir Stadium Kobe; Attendance: 3,907; Referee: Koei Koya

12 June Match 26	Tokushima Vortis (2)	1–0	(2) Vegalta Sendai	Naruto
19:00	Watari 90+3'	Report		Stadium: Pocarisweat Stadium; Attendance: 1,515; Referee: Tomokazu Sato

12 June Match 27	Kashiwa Reysol (1)	2–0	(3) Iwate Grulla Morioka	Kashiwa
19:00	Yamamoto 64', 75'	Report		Stadium: Sankyo Frontier Kashiwa Stadium; Attendance: 3,005; Referee: Takuto Okabe

12 June Match 28	Machida Zelvia (1)	1–1 (a.e.t.) (2–4 p)	(UL) University of Tsukuba	Machida
18:30	Yasui 22'	Report	Uchino 90+1'	Stadium: Machida Gion Stadium; Attendance: 1,948; Referee: Koichiro Fukushima
	Penalties
	Erik (penalty scored); Suzuki (penalty scored); Inaba (penalty missed); Araki (penalty missed)		(penalty scored) Uchino; (penalty scored) Kato; (penalty scored) Okita; (penalty missed) Kobayashi; (penalty scored) Sumi

12 June Match 29	Cerezo Osaka (1)	3–1	(5) J-Lease FC	Osaka
19:00	Watanabe 7'; Sakata 14'; Tameda 64'	Report	Fukumoto 27'	Stadium: Yodoko Sakura Stadium; Attendance: 2,901; Referee: Naoto Uehara

12 June Match 30	Ventforet Kofu (2)	2–0	(4) Honda FC	Kofu
19:00	Utaka 82', 90+1'	Report		Stadium: JIT Recycle Ink Stadium; Attendance: 3,391; Referee: Tomohiro Inoue

12 June Match 31	Albirex Niigata (1)	4–4 (a.e.t.) (3–1 p)	(3) Giravanz Kitakyushu	Niigata
19:00	Komi 14'; Taniguchi 45+3'; Okumura 53'; Akiyama 90' (pen.)	Report	Takahashi 37'; Sakamoto 42'; Watanabe 78'; Takayoshi 90+4'	Stadium: Denka Big Swan Stadium; Attendance: 6,519; Referee: Yudai Yamamoto
	Penalties
	Akiyama (penalty scored); Suzuki (penalty scored); Horigome (penalty scored)		(penalty scored) Hirahara; (penalty missed) Hasegawa; (penalty missed) Kudo; (penalty missed) Watanabe

12 June Match 32	V-Varen Nagasaki (2)	3–2	(3) Kamatamare Sanuki	Isahaya
19:00	Matsuzawa 1'; Juanma 3'; Yamada 58'	Report	Sago 44'; Kawanishi 70'	Stadium: Transcosmos Stadium Nagasaki; Attendance: 2,192; Referee: Shuhei Ishimaru

12 June Match 33	Kashima Antlers (1)	2–1	(3) Nara Club	Kashima
19:00	Čavrić 21'; Suzuki 53'	Report	Yoshimura 41'	Stadium: Kashima Soccer Stadium; Attendance: 4,150; Referee: Akihiko Ikeuchi

12 June Match 34	Fujieda MYFC (2)	2–0	(2) Tochigi SC	Fujieda
19:00	Shimabuku 5'; Nakagawa 33'	Report		Stadium: Fujieda Soccer Stadium; Attendance: 867; Referee: Reo Tanaka

12 June Match 35	Sagan Tosu (1)	2–1	(4) Kochi United	Tosu
19:00	Vinícius Araújo 3', 52'	Report	Kobayashi 44'	Stadium: Ekimae Real Estate Stadium; Attendance: 2,126; Referee: Damian Sylwestrzak (Poland)

12 June Match 36	Yokohama FC (2)	2–1 (a.e.t.)	(3) Vanraure Hachinohe	Yokohama
19:00	Mita 58'; Muroi 109'	Report	Senoo 88'	Stadium: NHK Spring Mitsuzawa Football Stadium; Attendance: 1,287; Referee: Genki Tawara

12 June Match 37	Nagoya Grampus (1)	0–1	(5) Japan Soccer College	Toyota
18:30		Report	Uemoto 51'	Stadium: Toyota Stadium; Attendance: 3,178; Referee: Koji Takasaki

12 June Match 38	Thespa Gunma (2)	1–1 (a.e.t.) (2–3 p)	(2) Renofa Yamaguchi	Maebashi
19:00	Hosogai 40' (pen.)	Report	Sílvio Junior 60'	Stadium: Shoda Shoyu Stadium Gunma; Attendance: 957; Referee: Daichi Shiino
	Penalties
	Sato (penalty missed); Saito (penalty missed); Iwamoto (penalty missed); Sagawa (penalty scored); Tagashira (penalty scored)		(penalty scored) Kato; (penalty missed) Tanabe; (penalty scored) Ishikawa; (penalty missed) Suenaga; (penalty scored) Wakatsuki

12 June Match 39	Kyoto Sanga (1)	2–0	(3) Omiya Ardija	Kyoto
19:00	Yachida 23'; Yamasaki 53'	Report		Stadium: Takebishi Stadium Kyoto; Attendance: 2,718; Referee: Yuzo Sutani

12 June Match 40	Shimizu S-Pulse (2)	9–0	(7) Mitsubishi Nagasaki	Shizuoka
19:00	Douglas Tanque 7'; Matsuzaki 29'; Kawatani 56'; Gunji 47', 64', 69', 83'; Chiba 63' (pen.); Kitagawa 90+4'	Report		Stadium: IAI Stadium Nihondaira; Attendance: 3,029; Referee: Yosuke Kubota

12 June Match 41	Yokohama F. Marinos (1)	2–2 (a.e.t.) (5–4 p)	(3) FC Gifu	Gifu
19:00	Uenaka 81'; Inoue 90+6'	Report	Arakaki 83'; Taguchi 89'	Stadium: Gifu Nagaragawa Meadow; Attendance: 3,515; Referee: Shu Kawamata
	Penalties
	Uenaka (penalty scored); Yamane (penalty scored); Murakami (penalty scored); Koike (penalty scored); Eduardo (penalty scored)		(penalty scored) Yamauchi; (penalty scored) Taguchi; (penalty scored) Kita; (penalty scored) Arakaki; (penalty missed) Kai

12 June Match 42	Roasso Kumamoto (2)	1–2	(2) Mito HollyHock	Kumamoto
19:00	Fujii 29'	Report	Ando 51'; Umeda 90+2'	Stadium: Egao Kenko Stadium; Attendance: 2,141; Referee: Tetsuro Yoshida

12 June Match 43	Gamba Osaka (1)	3–0	(3) Fukushima United	Suita
19:00	Dawhan 19'; Yamashita 25'; Jebali 35'	Report		Stadium: Panasonic Stadium Suita; Attendance: 4,738; Referee: Keigo Sendachi

12 June Match 44	Júbilo Iwata (1)	1–2	(3) Tegevajaro Miyazaki	Iwata
19:00	Bruno José 61'	Report	Ano 77'; Inoue 90+4'	Stadium: Yamaha Stadium; Attendance: 3,519; Referee: Yusuke Araki

12 June Match 45	Kawasaki Frontale (1)	2–0	(4) Sony Sendai	Kawasaki
19:00	Yamada 39'; Marcinho 58'	Report		Stadium: Uvance Todoroki Stadium by Fujitsu; Attendance: 7,000; Referee: Yuichi Nishimura

12 June Match 46	Oita Trinita (2)	1–0	(2) Kagoshima United	Oita
19:00	Isa 73'	Report		Stadium: Resonac Dome Oita; Attendance: 3,013; Referee: Hayato Shimizu

12 June Match 47	FC Tokyo (1)	3–0	(4) Veertien Mie	Chofu
19:00	Higashi 21'; Morishige 37'; Harakawa 42'	Report		Stadium: Ajinomoto Stadium; Attendance: 4,040; Referee: Koki Nagamine

12 June Match 48	JEF United Chiba (2)	2–1	(UL) Chukyo University	Chiba
19:00	Takagi 10'; Kazama 28'	Report	Oride 37'	Stadium: Fukuda Denshi Arena; Attendance: 2,692; Referee: Takahito Seta

12 June Match 49	Sanfrecce Hiroshima (1)	11–2	(5) Baleine Shimonoseki	Fukuyama
18:30	Douglas Vieira 7' (pen.), 45+2', 58'; Ohara 26', 51', 80'; Marcos Júnior 61'; Mitsuta 29', 45+4'; Aoyama 81'; Ezequiel 89'	Report	Nishida 32'; Yonezawa 72'	Stadium: Fukuyama Tsuun Rose Stadium; Attendance: 4,268; Referee: Hirokazu Otsubo

12 June Match 50	Blaublitz Akita (2)	0–2	(2) Iwaki FC	Akita
19:00		Report	Arima 35'; Yamaguchi 73'	Stadium: Soyu Stadium; Attendance: 872; Referee: Yoshiro Imamura

12 June Match 51	Shonan Bellmare (1)	3–1	(UL) Konan University	Hiratsuka
19:00	Yamada 37'; Lukian 80', 90+6'	Report	Shimizu 49'	Stadium: Lemon Gas Stadium Hiratsuka; Attendance: 1,942; Referee: Yusuke Ohashi

12 June Match 52	Tokyo Verdy (1)	5–0	(3) Nagano Parceiro	Kita
19:00	Yamada 30'; Hakamata 43', 62' (pen.); Yamami 76'; Kimura 85'	Report		Stadium: Ajinomoto Field Nishigaoka; Attendance: 3,237; Referee: Takafumi Mikuriya

12 June Match 53	Avispa Fukuoka (1)	8–0	(5) Fukuyama City	Fukuoka
19:00	Wellington 30'; Kanamori 43'; Kitajima 51'; Zahedi 65', 81'; Matsuoka 72', 88'; Tsuruno 77' (pen.)	Report		Stadium: Best Denki Stadium; Attendance: 2,643; Referee: Futoshi Nakamura

12 June Match 54	Fagiano Okayama (2)	1–7	(2) Ehime FC	Okayama
19:00	Tanaka 28'	Report	Moriwaki 1'; Hamashita 15', 70'; Funahashi 42', 51', 72'; Ozaki 86'	Stadium: City Light Stadium; Attendance: 2,464; Referee: Yoshimi Yamashita

12 June Match 55	Hokkaido Consadole Sapporo (1)	3–1	(4) Tochigi City	Sapporo
19:00	Kim Gun-hee 9'; Izuma 16'; Hara 65'	Report	Omotehara 45+3'	Stadium: Sapporo Dome; Attendance: 3,194; Referee: Jumpei Iida

12 June Match 56	Montedio Yamagata (2)	3–2	(3) SC Sagamihara	Tendo
19:00	Yamada 9'; Matsumoto 12'; Kato 38'	Report	Fukui 21'; Own goal 55' (o.g.)	Stadium: ND Soft Stadium Yamagata; Attendance: 2,564; Referee: Shingo Kuniyoshi

=== Third round ===
Number of teams per tier in this round
J1 League (1)	J2 League (2)	J3 League (3)	Regional 1st divs. (5)	University Leagues (UL)	Total
16 / 19	13 / 20	1 / 16	1 / 11	1 / 9	32 / 88

10 July Match 57	Vissel Kobe (1)	2–0	(2) Tokushima Vortis	Naruto
18:30	Sasaki 66'; Osako 73'	Report		Stadium: Pocarisweat Stadium; Attendance: 4,630; Referee: Yuzo Sutani

10 July Match 58	Kashiwa Reysol (1)	2–1 (a.e.t.)	(UL) University of Tsukuba	Kashiwa
19:00	Kinoshita 16'; Hosoya 100'	Report	Own goal 80' (o.g.)	Stadium: Sankyo Frontier Kashiwa Stadium; Attendance: 6,527; Referee: Yusuke Araki

10 July Match 59	Cerezo Osaka (1)	1–2 (a.e.t.)	(2) Ventforet Kofu	Kofu
19:00	Watanabe 54'	Report	Utaka 46'; Torikai 112'	Stadium: JIT Recycle Ink Stadium; Attendance: 5,038; Referee: Hiroki Kasahara

10 July Match 60	Albirex Niigata (1)	1–6	(2) V-Varen Nagasaki	Isahaya
19:00	Ishiyama 90+3'	Report	Sawada 6', 33'; Juanma 11', 76'; Nagura 52'; Kato 90+1'	Stadium: Transcosmos Stadium Nagasaki; Attendance: 2,732; Referee: Yudai Yamamoto

10 July Match 61	Kashima Antlers (1)	2–1	(2) Fujieda MYFC	Fujieda
19:00	Čavrić 70'; Nakama 89'	Report	Chaves 24' (pen.)	Stadium: Fujieda Soccer Stadium; Attendance: 3,069; Referee: Futoshi Nakamura

10 July Match 62	Sagan Tosu (1)	3–1	(2) Yokohama FC	Yokohama
18:30	Sakaiya 14'; Araújo 48'; Tezuka 50'	Report	Takahashi 53'	Stadium: Nippatsu Mitsuzawa Stadium; Attendance: 1,666; Referee: Yusuke Ohashi

17 July Match 63	Japan Soccer College (5)	0–3	(2) Renofa Yamaguchi	Yamaguchi
19:00		Report	Wakatsuki 13'; Suenaga 59'; Kawano 79'	Stadium: Ishin Me-Life Stadium; Attendance: 1,718; Referee: Keigo Sendachi
Note: The match was originally due to be played on 10 June, but was rescheduled due to poor weather conditions.

10 July Match 64	Kyoto Sanga (1)	3–1	(2) Shimizu S-Pulse	Shimizu
19:00	Hara 66', 90+2'; Hiraga 75'	Report	Carlinhos Júnior 35'	Stadium: IAI Stadium Nihondaira; Attendance: 4,269; Referee: Jumpei Iida

10 July Match 65	Yokohama F. Marinos (1)	2–2 (a.e.t.) (5–4 p)	(2) Mito HollyHock	Mito
19:00	Inoue 35'; Uenaka 84'	Report	Nose 10'; Kusano 14'	Stadium: K's denki Stadium Mito; Attendance: 2,739; Referee: Ryo Tanimoto
	Penalties
	Uenaka (penalty scored); Koike (penalty scored); Watanabe (penalty scored); Amano (penalty scored); Eduardo (penalty scored)		(penalty missed) Kubo; (penalty scored) Arai; (penalty scored) Ikari; (penalty scored) Nagai; (penalty scored) Saito

10 July Match 66	Gamba Osaka (1)	2–1	(3) Tegevajaro Miyazaki	Shintomi
19:00	Lavi 10'; Usami 74'	Report	Hashimoto 54'	Stadium: Ichigo Miyazaki Shintomi Football Stadium; Attendance: 3,158; Referee: Koki Nagamine

10 July Match 67	Kawasaki Frontale (1)	1–3	(2) Oita Trinita	Oita
19:00	Erison 89'	Report	Sasaki 61' (o.g.); Yasuda 63'; Ayukawa 78' (pen.)	Stadium: Resonac Dome Oita; Attendance: 4,056; Referee: Takuto Okabe

10 July Match 68	FC Tokyo (1)	1–2 (a.e.t.)	(2) JEF United Chiba	Chiba
19:00	Matsuki 49'	Report	Hayashi 79'; Goya 91'	Stadium: Fukuda Denshi Arena; Attendance: 7,442; Referee: Masuya Ueda

10 July Match 69	Sanfrecce Hiroshima (1)	4–0	(2) Iwaki FC	Iwaki
19:00	Sasaki 62', 68'; Ohashi 66'; Marcos Júnior 90+1'	Report		Stadium: Hawaiians Stadium Iwaki; Attendance: 3,074; Referee: Koei Koya

10 July Match 70	Shonan Bellmare (1)	1–0	(1) Tokyo Verdy	Hiratsuka
19:00	Suzuki 66'	Report		Stadium: Lemon Gas Stadium Hiratsuka; Attendance: 3,151; Referee: Koichiro Fukushima

10 July Match 71	Avispa Fukuoka (1)	0–2	(2) Ehime FC	Matsuyama
19:00		Report	Mihara 52'; Fujihara 75'	Stadium: Ningineer Stadium; Attendance: 1,395; Referee: Yoshihiro Imamura

10 July Match 72	Hokkaido Consadole Sapporo (1)	6–3	(2) Montedio Yamagata	Tendo
19:00	Tanaka 6', 57'; Omori 19'; Okada 45+3', 84'; Komai 53'	Report	Kano 16'; Goto 33'; Kida 60'	Stadium: ND Soft Stadium Yamagata; Attendance: 3,347; Referee: Yuichi Nishimura

=== Round of 16 ===
A draw was held on 12 July to determine the pairings for this round onwards.

Number of teams per tier in this round
J1 League (1)	J2 League (2)	Lower leagues	Total
10 / 19	6 / 20	0 / 48	16 / 88

21 August Match 73	V-Varen Nagasaki (2)	2–3	(1) Yokohama F. Marinos	Isahaya
19:03	Juanma 58'; Matheus Jesus 90+2'	Report	Amano 67'; Nishimura 90+8'; Uenaka 90+10'	Stadium: Transcosmos Stadium Nagasaki; Attendance: 5,135; Referee: Akihiko Ikeuchi

21 August Match 74	Sagan Tosu (1)	0–2	(2) Renofa Yamaguchi	Yamaguchi
19:00		Report	Wakatsuki 6'; Yamamoto 12'	Stadium: Ishin Me-Life Stadium; Attendance: 3,418; Referee: Ryo Tanimoto

21 August Match 75	Sanfrecce Hiroshima (1)	2–0	(2) Ehime FC	Matsuyama
19:03	Arslan 69'; Kato 79'	Report		Stadium: Ningineer Stadium; Attendance: 5,111; Referee: Yuichi Nishimura

21 August Match 76	Gamba Osaka (1)	3–2	(1) Shonan Bellmare	Suita
19:03	Yamashita 14'; Fukuoka 41'; Nakatani 76'	Report	Okuno 11'; Suzuki 35'	Stadium: Panasonic Stadium Suita; Attendance: 6,024; Referee: Yuzo Sutani

21 August Match 77	Ventforet Kofu (2)	1–2	(1) Kashima Antlers	Kofu
19:04	Misawa 29'	Report	Fujii 45+2'; Ueda 90'	Stadium: JIT Recycle Ink Stadium; Attendance: 7,796; Referee: Yoshimi Yamashita

21 August Match 78	Kashiwa Reysol (1)	0–1	(1) Vissel Kobe	Kashiwa
19:03		Report	Sasaki 3'	Stadium: Sankyo Frontier Kashiwa Stadium; Attendance: 6,219; Referee: Jumpei Iida

21 August Match 79	Kyoto Sanga (1)	2–0	(2) Oita Trinita	Oita
19:00	Matsuda 57'; Kawasaki 81'	Report		Stadium: Resonac Dome Oita; Attendance: 4,358; Referee: Yoshiro Imamura

21 August Match 80	JEF United Chiba (2)	1–0	(1) Hokkaido Consadole Sapporo	Chiba
19:03	Shinada 45'	Report		Stadium: Fukuda Denshi Arena; Attendance: 6,552; Referee: Naoto Uehara

=== Quarter-finals ===
Number of teams per tier in this round
J1 League (1)	J2 League (2)	Other leagues (3+)	Total
6 / 19	2 / 20	0 / 48	8 / 88

11 September Match 82	Sanfrecce Hiroshima (1)	1–2	(1) Gamba Osaka	Hiroshima
19:30	Kato 16'	Report	Yamada 14'; Kishimoto 79'	Stadium: Edion Peace Wing Hiroshima; Attendance: 9,321; Referee: Hayato Shimizu

18 September Match 84	Kyoto Sanga (1)	3–0	(2) JEF United Chiba	Chiba
19:00	Toyokawa 11'; Marco Túlio 49'; Hiraga 85'	Report		Stadium: Fukuda Denshi Arena; Attendance: 6,883; Referee: Koki Nagamine

25 September Match 81	Yokohama F. Marinos (1)	5–1	(2) Renofa Yamaguchi	Yokohama
18:30	Yamane 16'; Élber 51'; Yan Matheus 71'; Mizunuma 77'; Anderson Lopes 86'	Report	Okuyama 23'	Stadium: Nissan Stadium; Attendance: 6,201; Referee: Koei Koya

25 September Match 83	Kashima Antlers (1)	0–3	(1) Vissel Kobe	Kobe
19:00		Report	Morioka 15'; Sasaki 83'; Ideguchi 90+7'	Stadium: Noevir Stadium Kobe; Attendance: 7,231; Referee: César Arturo Ramos (Mexico)

=== Semi-finals ===
Number of teams per tier in this round
J1 League (1)	Total
4 / 19	4 / 88

27 October Match 85	Yokohama F.Marinos (1)	2–3 (a.e.t.)	(1) Gamba Osaka	Suita
13:05	Yan Matheus 37'; Matsubara 88'	Report	Yamada 26'; Nakatani 90+3'; Sakamoto 120+5'	Stadium: Panasonic Stadium Suita; Attendance: 20,311; Referee: Hiroyuki Kimura

27 October Match 86	Vissel Kobe (1)	2–1	(1) Kyoto Sanga	Kobe
15:00	Miyashiro 18'; Sasaki 55'	Report	Marco Túlio 32'	Stadium: Noevir Stadium Kobe; Attendance: 14,980; Referee: Yuichi Nishimura

=== Final ===
Number of teams per tier in this round
J1 League (1)	Total
2 / 19	2 / 88

23 November Match 87	Gamba Osaka (1)	0–1	(1) Vissel Kobe	Shinjuku
14:00		Report	Miyashiro 64'	Stadium: Japan National Stadium; Attendance: 56,824; Referee: Yudai Yamamoto

== Top scorers ==
As of 27 October 2024.

Rank	Player	Team	Goals
1	(Japan) Riku Gunji	Shimizu S-Pulse	4
1	(Spain) Juanma	V-Varen Nagasaki	4
1	(Japan) Daiju Sasaki	Vissel Kobe	4
4	(Japan) Motoki Ohara	Sanfrecce Hiroshima	3
4	(Nigeria) Peter Utaka	Ventforet Kofu	3
4	(Japan) Kazumasa Shimizu	Fukushima United	3
4	(Brazil) Douglas Vieira	Sanfrecce Hiroshima	3
4	(Brazil) Vinícius Araújo	Sagan Tosu	3
4	(Japan) Asahi Uenaka	Yokohama F. Marinos	3
4	(Japan) Kyota Funahashi	Ehime FC	3

== See also ==
- 2024 J1 League
- 2024 J2 League
- 2024 J3 League
- 2024 Japan Football League
- 2024 Japanese Super Cup
