= List of Japan Football League football transfers winter 2022–23 =

Transfer list

This is a list of Japan Football League transfers made during the winter transfer window of the 2023 season by each club.

== Briobecca Urayasu ==
Transfers in
Join on	Pos.	Player	Moving from	Transfer type
Pre-season	GK	(Japan) Koji Takashima	(Japan) Kagura Shimane	Free transfer
Pre-season	DF	(Japan) Shunya Akamatsu	(Japan) Vanraure Hachinohe	Free transfer
Pre-season	DF	(Japan) Takeru Osada	(Japan) Kagura Shimane	Free transfer
Pre-season	DF	(Japan) Takefumi Yoshita	(Japan) Okinawa SV	Free transfer
Pre-season	DF	(Japan) Futoshi Arai	(Japan) Tokyo United	Free transfer
Pre-season	DF	(Japan) Ryota Fujimori	(Japan) Kanagawa University	Free transfer
Pre-season	DF	(Japan) Shion Kurita	(Japan) Juntendo University	Free transfer
Pre-season	MF	(Japan) Kenta Murakoshi	(Japan) Nankatsu SC	Free transfer
Pre-season	FW	(Japan) Obiora Ishibashi	(Japan) Joyful Honda Tsukuba	Free transfer

Transfers out
Leave on	Pos.	Player	Moving to	Transfer type
Pre-season	DF	(Japan) Daisuke Kato	(Japan) SC Sagamihara	Full transfer
Pre-season	DF	(Japan) Ryota Kasamatsu	–	Contract expiration
Pre-season	DF	(Japan) Tomohiro Shinoda	–	Contract expiration
Pre-season	MF	(Japan) Yuto Takechi	–	Contract expiration
Pre-season	FW	(Japan) Ryuto Ito	–	Contract expiration

== Criacao Shinjuku ==
Transfers in
Join on	Pos.	Player	Moving from	Transfer type
Pre-season	GK	(Japan) Suguru Asanuma	(Japan) V-Varen Nagasaki	Free transfer
Pre-season	DF	(Japan) Shoto Suzuki	Unattached	Full transfer
Pre-season	DF	(Japan) Ryotaro Takeuchi	(Japan) Sagan Tosu	Loan transfer
Pre-season	MF	(Japan) Keita Ishii	(Japan) Iwate Grulla Morioka	Full transfer
Pre-season	MF	(Japan) Yuto Nakayama	(Japan) Thespakusatsu Gunma	Full transfer
Pre-season	FW	(Japan) Kazuki Saito	(Japan) Fagiano Okayama	Free transfer
Pre-season	FW	(Japan) Tsubasa Sano	(Japan) Nagano Parceiro	Free transfer
Pre-season	FW	(Japan) Hiroki Scharod Akai	(Japan) Meiji University	Free transfer

Transfers out
Leave on	Pos.	Player	Moving to	Transfer type
Pre-season	DF	(Japan) Yuki Onda	–	Contract expiration
Pre-season	DF	(Japan) Yuki Ishii	–	Contract expiration
Pre-season	MF	(Japan) Kengo Kawai	–	Contract expiration
Pre-season	MF	(Japan) Ayumu Owada	–	Contract expiration
Pre-season	MF	(Japan) Ryo Horita	–	Contract expiration
Pre-season	GK	(Japan) Yuya Mizutani	–	Retirement
Pre-season	DF	(Japan) Hayao Ebata	–	Retirement
Pre-season	DF	(Japan) Katsuhisa Ito	–	Retirement
Pre-season	MF	(Japan) Yuma Tanigawa	–	Retirement
Pre-season	FW	(Japan) Hiroki Iwata	–	Retirement

== Honda FC ==
Transfers in
Join on	Pos.	Player	Moving from	Transfer type
Pre-season	DF	(Japan) Daichi Miwa	(Japan) Osaka University HSS	Free transfer
Pre-season	DF	(Japan) Koshiro Chibana	(Japan) Chukyo University	Free transfer
Pre-season	MF	(Japan) Kenshin Yuba	(Japan) Kokushikan University	Free transfer

Transfers out
Leave on	Pos.	Player	Moving to	Transfer type
Pre-season	DF	(Japan) Kazuki Tominaga	–	Contract expiration
Pre-season	MF	(Japan) Hayato Horiuchi	(Japan) Nara Club	Free transfer
Pre-season	FW	(Japan) Takaya Sakiyama	–	Contract expiration

== Kochi United ==
Transfers in
Join on	Pos.	Player	Moving from	Transfer type
Pre-season	GK	(Japan) Ryusei Ito	(Japan) Osaka Gakuin University	Free transfer
Pre-season	GK	(Japan) Itsuki Ueda	(Japan) Zweigen Kanazawa	Loan transfer
Pre-season	DF	(Japan) Daichi Kobayashi	(Japan) Vanraure Hachinohe	Free transfer
Pre-season	DF	(Japan) Naoya Imamura	(Japan) Kagura Shimane	Free transfer
Pre-season	DF	(Japan) Naiki Imai	(Japan) Suzuka Point Getters	Free transfer
Pre-season	DF	(Japan) Reo Fukuda	(Japan) Kyoto Sangyo University	Free transfer
Pre-season	DF	(Japan) Ryuya Fukushima	(Japan) Urawa Red Diamonds	Loan transfer
Pre-season	DF	(Japan) Yu Miyamoto	(Japan) Tokyo Verdy	Loan transfer
Pre-season	MF	(Japan) Taiga Sasaki	(Japan) Sony Sendai	Free transfer
Pre-season	MF	(Japan) Tsubasa Misao	(Japan) FC Tokushima	Free transfer
Pre-season	MF	(Japan) Shunsuke Hashimoto	(Japan) Reilac Shiga	Free transfer
Pre-season	MF	(Japan) Yui Takano	(Japan) Tokoha University	Free transfer
Pre-season	MF	(Japan) Ryosei Imai	(Japan) Nippon SS University	Free transfer
Pre-season	MF	(Japan) Kosei Tajiri	(Japan) Roasso Kumamoto	Free transfer
Pre-season	FW	(Japan) Toshiki Toya	(Japan) Avispa Fukuoka	Free transfer
Pre-season	FW	(Japan) Koki Taguchi	(Japan) Tokyo Musashino United	Free transfer
Pre-season	FW	(Japan) Asahi Kanehara	(Japan) Ryutsu Keizai University	Free transfer
Pre-season	FW	(Japan) Kokoro Kobayashi	(Japan) Ryutsu Keizai University	Free transfer
Pre-season	FW	(Japan) Retsushi Harada	(Japan) Kyoto Sangyo University	Free transfer
Pre-season	FW	(Japan) Kakeru Higuchi	(Japan) Roasso Kumamoto	Free transfer

Transfers out
Leave on	Pos.	Player	Moving to	Transfer type
Pre-season	GK	(Japan) Ryo Hasegawa	(Japan) Aventura Kawaguchi	Free transfer
Pre-season	DF	(Japan) Shota Fujisaki	(Japan) Tiamo Hirakata	Free transfer
Pre-season	DF	(Japan) Daisuke Inazumi	(Japan) Vanraure Hachinohe	Free transfer
Pre-season	DF	(Japan) Ryota Okada	(Japan) Aries Tokyo	Free transfer
Pre-season	DF	(Japan) Yuki Fukai	(Japan) Hokkaido Tokachi Sky Earth	Free transfer
Pre-season	DF	(Japan) Haruto Kawamae	(Japan) Azul Claro Numazu	Loan expiration
Pre-season	DF	(Japan) Natsu Motoishi	(Japan) FC Gifu	Loan expiration
Pre-season	DF	(Japan) Haruki Yoshida	(Japan) Ehime FC	Loan expiration
Pre-season	MF	(Japan) Mizuki Aiba	(Japan) Vanraure Hachinohe	Free transfer
Pre-season	MF	(Japan) Kaito Hosoyama	(Japan) Aries Tokyo	Free transfer
Pre-season	MF	(Japan) Daisuke Okada	(Japan) FC AWJ	Free transfer
Pre-season	MF	(Japan) Kento Nakamasu	(Japan) Kamakura International	Free transfer
Pre-season	MF	(Japan) Shoma Tanaka	(Japan) Wyvern FC	Free transfer
Pre-season	MF	(Japan) Kyoya Yamada	(Japan) Fagiano Okayama	Loan expiration
Pre-season	MF	(Japan) Mutsuki Hirooka	(Japan) Montedio Yamagata	Loan expiration
Pre-season	MF	(Japan) Riku Furuyado	–	Mutual agreement
Pre-season	FW	(Japan) Kaima Akahoshi	(Japan) Kamatamare Sanuki	Free transfer
Pre-season	FW	(Japan) Koji Nishimura	–	Contract expiration

== Maruyasu Okazaki ==
Transfers in
Join on	Pos.	Player	Moving from	Transfer type
Pre-season	GK	(Japan) Sora Kitagawa	(Japan) Ryutsu Keizai University	Free transfer
Pre-season	DF	(Japan) Rai Watanabe	(Japan) Aomori Yamada HS	Free transfer
Pre-season	DF	(Japan) Kenta Uchida	(Japan) Ehime FC	Free transfer
Pre-season	DF	(Japan) Yusuke Murase	(Japan) FC Ryukyu	Free transfer
Pre-season	DF	(Japan) Takahiro Urashima	(Japan) Verspah Oita	Free transfer
Pre-season	MF	(Japan) Wataru Sasaki	(Japan) Kamatamare Sanuki	Free transfer
Pre-season	MF	(Japan) Shuto Watanabe	(Japan) Verspah Oita	Free transfer
Pre-season	MF	(Japan) Kotaro Hara	(Japan) Hannan University	Free transfer
Pre-season	MF	(Japan) Hayato Kato	(Japan) Tokoha University	Free transfer
Pre-season	FW	(Japan) Jukiya Fujishima	(Japan) Suzuka Point Getters	Free transfer
Pre-season	FW	(Japan) Hiroki Maeda	(Japan) Verspah Oita	Free transfer
Pre-season	FW	(Japan) Koya Hakamata	(Japan) Honda FC U18s	Free transfer

Transfers out
Leave on	Pos.	Player	Moving to	Transfer type
Pre-season	GK	(Japan) Satoshi Tokizawa	(Japan) Wyvern FC	Free transfer
Pre-season	DF	(Japan) Kazuki Ninomiya	(Japan) Fukuyama City	Free transfer
Pre-season	DF	(Japan) Teruyuki Moniwa	(Japan) FC Kariya	Free transfer
Pre-season	DF	(Japan) Yuto Miyadera	(Japan) FC Ise-Shima	Free transfer
Pre-season	DF	(Japan) Haruto Ito	–	Retirement
Pre-season	DF	(Japan) Shogo Muraoka	–	Retirement
Pre-season	DF	(Japan) Kazuki Ninomiya	–	Contract expiration
Pre-season	DF	(Japan) Ko Ikeda	(Japan) Yokohama F. Marinos	Loan expiration
Pre-season	DF	(Japan) Akira Yoshida	(Japan) Nagoya Grampus	Loan expiration
Pre-season	MF	(Japan) Takumi Fujiwara	(Japan) Tochigi City	Free transfer
Pre-season	MF	(Japan) Yuga Harashina	(Japan) Tokyo 23	Free transfer
Pre-season	MF	(Japan) Hidemi Jinushizono	–	Retirement
Pre-season	MF	(Japan) Jin Shiomi	–	Retirement
Pre-season	FW	(Japan) Tatsuma Sakai	(Japan) Nara Club	Free transfer
Pre-season	FW	(Japan) Yuki Takahashi	(Japan) FC Ise-Shima	Free transfer
Pre-season	FW	(Japan) Kohei Mishima	(Japan) COEDO Kawagoe	Free transfer
Pre-season	FW	(Japan) Ndao Talla	(Japan) Yokohama F. Marinos	Loan expiration
Pre-season	FW	(Japan) Daigoro Shirakawa	–	Retirement

== Minebea Mitsumi ==
Transfers in
Join on	Pos.	Player	Moving from	Transfer type
Pre-season	DF	(Japan) Mao Igarashi	(Japan) Chuo Gakuin University	Free transfer
Pre-season	DF	(Japan) Tomoki Okawa	(Japan) Fukuoka University	Free transfer

Transfers out
Leave on	Pos.	Player	Moving to	Transfer type
Pre-season	GK	(Japan) Kazuki Kumashiro	–	Contract expiration
Pre-season	DF	(Japan) Yusuke Hasegawa	(Japan) Vanraure Hachinohe	Free transfer
Pre-season	DF	(Japan) Arashi Tamashiro	–	Retirement
Pre-season	MF	(Japan) Yuiku Fujiyama	(Japan) Suzuka Point Getters	Free transfer

== Okinawa SV ==
Transfers in
Join on	Pos.	Player	Moving from	Transfer type
Pre-season	GK	(Japan) Takuma Narahashi	(Japan) Fujieda MYFC	Free transfer
Pre-season	GK	(Japan) Timothy Shiraoka	(Japan) Hokkaido Tokachi Sky Earth	Free transfer
Pre-season	DF	(Japan) Ryo Odajima	(Japan) Iwaki FC	Free transfer
Pre-season	DF	(Japan) Daisuke Matsushita	(Japan) Kagura Shimane	Free transfer
Pre-season	DF	(Japan) Kota Nishihara	(Japan) Ryutsu Keizai University	Free transfer
Pre-season	MF	(Japan) Tetsuya Yonezawa	(Japan) Iwaki FC	Free transfer
Pre-season	MF	(Japan) Tsubasa Iijima	(Japan) Artista Asama	Free transfer
Pre-season	MF	(Japan) Mashu Sada	(Japan) FC Kariya	Free transfer
Pre-season	MF	(Japan) Kazuma Tomikuda	(Japan) Sendai University	Free transfer
Pre-season	FW	(Japan) Ryuichi Ichiki	(Japan) Thespakusatsu Gunma	Free transfer
Pre-season	FW	(Japan) Rai Ijuin	(Japan) Nobeoka Agata	Free transfer

Transfers out
Leave on	Pos.	Player	Moving to	Transfer type
Pre-season	GK	(Japan) Kenta Isaka	(Japan) Brew Kashima	Free transfer
Pre-season	GK	(Japan) Lenon Murata	–	Contract expiration
Pre-season	DF	(Japan) Takefumi Yoshita	(Japan) Briobecca Urayasu	Free transfer
Pre-season	DF	(Japan) Kazuki Higa	(Japan) Brew Kashima	Free transfer
Pre-season	DF	(Japan) Takahiro Morizono	–	Contract expiration
Pre-season	DF	(Japan) Kazuki Nakabayashi	–	Contract expiration
Pre-season	MF	(Japan) Tsubasa Fujiike	(Japan) Belugarosso Iwami	Free transfer
Pre-season	MF	(Japan) Yasunori Seki	–	Contract expiration
Pre-season	MF	(Japan) Hiroki Todaka	–	Contract expiration

== Reilac Shiga ==
Transfers in
Join on	Pos.	Player	Moving from	Transfer type
19 Mar	MF	(Hong Kong) Leung Yau Wai	(Thailand) Chiangrai City	Free transfer
Pre-season	GK	(Japan) Tomofumi Ikematsu	(Japan) Suzuka Point Getters	Free transfer
Pre-season	GK	(Japan) Hikaru Kawabata	(Japan) HBO Tokyo	Free transfer
Pre-season	DF	(Japan) So Hirao	(Japan) Thespakusatsu Gunma	Free transfer
Pre-season	DF	(Japan) Keita Ide	(Japan) Tochigi SC	Free transfer
Pre-season	DF	(Japan) Yuya Hiyama	(Japan) Tiamo Hirakata	Free transfer
Pre-season	DF	(South Korea) Moon Joon-su	(Japan) Cento Cuore Harima	Free transfer
Pre-season	MF	(Japan) Masaomi Nakano	(Japan) Iwate Grulla Morioka	Free transfer
Pre-season	MF	(Japan) Genta Umiguchi	(Japan) Suzuka Point Getters	Free transfer
Pre-season	MF	(Japan) Shota Saito	(Japan) Suzuka Point Getters	Free transfer
Pre-season	MF	(Japan) Kodai Sakamoto	(Japan) Suzuka Point Getters	Free transfer
Pre-season	MF	(Japan) Kazuki Shoji	(Japan) Ryutsu Keizai University	Free transfer
Pre-season	MF	(Japan) Shunsuke Hirai	(Japan) Yokohama F. Marinos	Loan transfer
Pre-season	FW	(Japan) Yuma Kawamori	(Japan) Suzuka Point Getters	Free transfer
Pre-season	FW	(Japan) Kohei Hattori	(Japan) Asuka FC	Free transfer
Pre-season	FW	(Japan) Sora Takeda	(Japan) Cobaltore Onagawa	Free transfer
Pre-season	FW	(Japan) Shuga Ara	(Japan) Nankatsu SC	Free transfer
Pre-season	FW	(Japan) Taiga Matsubara	(Japan) Hannan University	Free transfer

Transfers out
Leave on	Pos.	Player	Moving to	Transfer type
Pre-season	GK	(Japan) Naotaka Ikegami	(Japan) Arterivo Wakayama	Free transfer
Pre-season	GK	(Japan) Taito Okino	–	Contract expiration
Pre-season	DF	(Japan) Ryo Nishiguchi	–	Contract expiration
Pre-season	DF	(Japan) Sota Watanabe	–	Contract expiration
Pre-season	MF	(Japan) Shunsuke Hashimoto	(Japan) Kochi United	Free transfer
Pre-season	MF	(Japan) Keita Takami	(Japan) Suzuka Point Getters	Free transfer
Pre-season	MF	(Japan) Reo Takeshita	(Japan) Tiamo Hirakata	Free transfer
Pre-season	MF	(Japan) Tatsuro Yamauchi	(Japan) Arterivo Wakayama	Free transfer
Pre-season	MF	(Japan) Ryuki Nishimuro	(Japan) Shinagawa CC	Free transfer
Pre-season	MF	(Japan) Akiyuki Hasegawa	–	Contract expiration
Pre-season	MF	(Japan) Hikaru Morishige	–	Retirement
Pre-season	MF	(Japan) Kazuto Nishida	–	Retirement
Pre-season	MF	(Japan) Reiji Saneyoshi	–	Retirement
Pre-season	FW	(Japan) Daiji Oguchi	(Japan) Tokyo Musashino United	Free transfer
Pre-season	FW	(Japan) Kaito Ikeda	(Japan) Lagend Shiga	Free transfer
Pre-season	FW	(Japan) Reo Takeshita	–	Contract expiration
Pre-season	FW	(South Korea) Cho Hyeong-in	–	Contract expiration

== ReinMeer Aomori ==
Transfers in
Join on	Pos.	Player	Moving from	Transfer type
Pre-season	GK	(Japan) Rui Sammonji	(Japan) Niigata University HW	Free transfer
Pre-season	DF	(Japan) Yosuke Toji	(Japan) Zweigen Kanazawa	Free transfer
Pre-season	DF	(Japan) Shunta Aoki	(Japan) Kanazawa Seiryo University	Free transfer
Pre-season	DF	(Japan) Yudai Iwama	(Japan) Fujieda MYFC	Free transfer
Pre-season	DF	(Japan) Gaku Inaba	(Japan) Zweigen Kanazawa	Loan transfer
Pre-season	MF	(Japan) Masaya Yoshida	(Japan) Matsumoto Yamaga	Free transfer
Pre-season	MF	(Japan) Kakeru Suminaga	(Japan) Nagano Parceiro	Free transfer
Pre-season	MF	(Japan) Kazuki Yamaguchi	(Japan) Nagano Parceiro	Free transfer
Pre-season	MF	(Japan) Satoru Maruoka	(Japan) Vanraure Hachinohe	Free transfer
Pre-season	MF	(Japan) Taisei Hikima	(Japan) Hachinohe Gakuin University	Free transfer
Pre-season	MF	(Japan) Seiryo Nakamura	(Japan) Osaka Kyoiku; University	Free transfer
Pre-season	MF	(Japan) Kaito Hirata	(Japan) Mito HollyHock	Free transfer
Pre-season	FW	(Japan) Koki Kido	(Japan) Montedio Yamagata	Free transfer
Pre-season	FW	(Japan) Takayuki Funayama	(Japan) SC Sagamihara	Free transfer
Pre-season	FW	(Japan) Ryu Joseph Hashimura	(Japan) Artista Asama	Free transfer

Transfers out
Leave on	Pos.	Player	Moving to	Transfer type
Pre-season	GK	(Japan) Peter Kwame Aizawa	(Japan) Vanraure Hachinohe	Full transfer
Pre-season	GK	(Japan) Yusei Narita	(Japan) FC Kariya	Full transfer
Pre-season	DF	(Japan) Takumi Sakai	(Japan) FC Osaka	Full transfer
Pre-season	DF	(Japan) Taiki Kikuchi	(Japan) Tokyo Musashino United	Full transfer
Pre-season	DF	(Japan) Takaaki Kinoshita	(Japan) Shinagawa CC	Full transfer
Pre-season	DF	(Japan) Kenichiro Hirata	–	Contract expiration
Pre-season	DF	(Japan) Jo Kurosawa	–	Contract expiration
Pre-season	DF	(Japan) Tomoya Inoue	–	Contract expiration
Pre-season	MF	(Japan) Kaito Hirata	(Japan) Mito HollyHock	Loan expiration
Pre-season	MF	(Japan) Kaiga Murakoshi	(Japan) Matsumoto Yamaga	Loan expiration
Pre-season	MF	(Japan) Shunsuke Hirai	(Japan) Yokohama F. Marinos	Loan expiration
Pre-season	MF	(Japan) Keigo Sakakibara	(Japan) Yokohama F. Marinos	Loan expiration
Pre-season	MF	(Japan) Takumi Tsukui	(Japan) Yokohama F. Marinos	Loan expiration
Pre-season	MF	(Japan) Yuto Sashinami	–	Contract expiration
Pre-season	FW	(Japan) Taiki Yukutake	(Japan) Tokyo Musashino United	Full transfer
Pre-season	FW	(Japan) Atsushi Bando	(Australia) Nunawading City	Full transfer
Pre-season	FW	(Brazil) Halef Pitbull	(Portugal) Berço SC	Loan expiration
Pre-season	FW	(Japan) Jun Hiratsuka	–	Contract expiration

== Sony Sendai ==
Transfers in
Join on	Pos.	Player	Moving from	Transfer type
Pre-season	GK	(Japan) Shun Yaida	(Japan) Fukuoka University	Free transfer
Pre-season	GK	(Japan) Ryo Matsuda	(Japan) Tokyo International University	Free transfer
Pre-season	DF	(Japan) Yuji Goto	(Japan) Juntendo University	Free transfer
Pre-season	DF	(Japan) Goshi Otomo	(Japan) Tohoku Gakuin High School	Free transfer
Pre-season	DF	(Japan) Taiyo Kumagai	(Japan) Osaka University HSS	Free transfer
Pre-season	DF	(Japan) Tasuku Yamashita	(Japan) Hachinohe Gakuin University	Free transfer
Pre-season	DF	(Japan) Yuya Hirayama	(Japan) Osaka University HSS	Free transfer
Pre-season	MF	(Japan) Ryota Ito	(Japan) Hosei University	Free transfer
Pre-season	MF	(Japan) Taiga Sato	(Japan) Fuji University	Free transfer
Pre-season	FW	(Japan) Taro Katsuura	(Japan) Chuo University	Free transfer
Pre-season	FW	(Japan) Eishun Shida	(Japan) Tokai Gakuen University	Free transfer

Transfers out
Leave on	Pos.	Player	Moving to	Transfer type
Pre-season	GK	(Japan) Yuki Furukawa	–	Contract expiration
Pre-season	GK	(Japan) Yuto Kamogawa	–	Contract expiration
Pre-season	DF	(Japan) Konosuke Fukumiya	(Japan) Verspah Oita	Free transfer
Pre-season	DF	(Japan) Hikaru Ishigami	(Japan) Verspah Oita	Free transfer
Pre-season	DF	(Japan) Keisuke Yoshikawa	(Japan) Cobaltore Onagawa	Free transfer
Pre-season	DF	(Japan) Tomoya Suzuki	–	Contract expiration
Pre-season	MF	(Japan) Taiga Sasaki	(Japan) Kochi United	Free transfer
Pre-season	MF	(Japan) Taisei Kaneko	–	Contract expiration
Pre-season	FW	(Japan) Yuki Miura	(Japan) Cobaltore Onagawa	Free transfer
Pre-season	FW	(Japan) Yuta Uchino	–	Contract expiration

== Suzuka Point Getters ==
Transfers in
Join on	Pos.	Player	Moving from	Transfer type
Pre-season	GK	(Hong Kong) To Chun Kiu	(Hong Kong) Sham Shui Po	Free transfer
Pre-season	DF	(Japan) Kaito Kuwahara	(Japan) Avispa Fukuoka	Free transfer
Pre-season	DF	(Japan) Kyosuke Fujiyama	(Montenegro) OFK Nikšić	Free transfer
Pre-season	DF	(Japan) Takaichi Yamashita	(Japan) Joyful Honda Tsukuba	Free transfer
Pre-season	DF	(Japan) Taiga Hagiwara	(Japan) Ococias Kyoto	Free transfer
Pre-season	DF	(Japan) Shunsuke Ishikawa	(Japan) Tokyo Int. University	Free transfer
Pre-season	DF	(Japan) Takushi Yuzawa	(Japan) Tokyo Int. University	Free transfer
Pre-season	MF	(Japan) Yuiku Fujiyama	(Japan) Minebea Mitsumi	Free transfer
Pre-season	MF	(Japan) Seiya Nawa	(Japan) Hokkaido Tokachi Sky Earth	Free transfer
Pre-season	MF	(Japan) Kazuki Arima	(Japan) Sanno Institute of Management	Free transfer
Pre-season	MF	(Japan) Ryota Onodera	(Japan) Sanno Institute of Management	Free transfer
Pre-season	MF	(Japan) Shota Suzuki	(Japan) Chuo University	Free transfer
Pre-season	FW	(Japan) Tatsunori Miyoshi	(Japan) Ritsumeikan University	Free transfer
Pre-season	FW	(Japan) Shunsuke Yagihashi	(Japan) Tokyo Int. University	Free transfer
Pre-season	FW	(Japan) Reoto Kodama	(Japan) Renofa Yamaguchi	Loan transfer

Transfers out
Leave on	Pos.	Player	Moving to	Transfer type
Pre-season	GK	(Japan) Tomofumi Ikematsu	(Japan) Rayluck Shiga	Full transfer
Pre-season	GK	(Japan) Kaito Tsuruta	(Japan) Basara Hyogo	Full transfer
Pre-season	GK	(Japan) Ryo Ishii	(Japan) Zweigen Kanazawa	Loan expiration
Pre-season	DF	(Japan) Hayato Ueda	(Japan) Veertien Mie	Free transfer
Pre-season	DF	(Japan) Seiji Shindo	(Japan) Tokyo 23	Free transfer
Pre-season	DF	(Japan) Naiki Imai	(Japan) Kochi United	Free transfer
Pre-season	DF	(Japan) Koki Inoue	(Japan) Azul Claro Numazu	Loan expiration
Pre-season	DF	(Japan) Taku Kikushima	–	Contract expiration
Pre-season	DF	(Japan) Takahiro Nakazato	(Japan) YSCC Yokohama	Free transfer
Pre-season	DF	(Japan) Yuto Nakamura	–	Retirement
Pre-season	MF	(Japan) Kazuma Sato	(Australia) Malvern City	Free transfer
Pre-season	MF	(Japan) Shota Saito	(Japan) Rayluck Shiga	Free transfer
Pre-season	MF	(Japan) Kodai Sakamoto	(Japan) Rayluck Shiga	Free transfer
Pre-season	MF	(Japan) Tatsumi Hineno	(Japan) Verspah Oita	Free transfer
Pre-season	MF	(Japan) Atsuki Wada	(Japan) J-Lease FC	Full transfer
Pre-season	MF	(Japan) Shunnosuke Matsuki	(Japan) Fagiano Okayama	Loan expiration
Pre-season	MF	(Japan) Yuto Kito	–	Retirement
Pre-season	MF	(Japan) Koji Hashimoto	–	Contract expiration
Pre-season	MF	(Japan) Genta Umiguchi	(Japan) Reilac Shiga	Free transfer
Pre-season	FW	(Japan) Junya Kitano	(Japan) Arterivo Wakayama	Full transfer
Pre-season	FW	(Japan) Jukiya Fujishima	(Japan) Maruyasu Okazaki	Free transfer
Pre-season	FW	(Japan) Yuma Kawamori	(Japan) Rayluck Shiga	Free transfer
Pre-season	FW	(Japan) Junki Endo	(Japan) J-Lease FC	Free transfer
Pre-season	FW	(Japan) Kazuyoshi Miura	(Japan) Yokohama FC	Loan expiration
Pre-season	FW	(Japan) Mark Ajay Kurita	(Japan) Kamatamare Sanuki	Loan expiration
Pre-season	FW	(Brazil) Vinícius Faria	(Brazil) Nacional-SP	Loan expiration

== Tiamo Hirakata ==
Transfers in
Join on	Pos.	Player	Moving from	Transfer type
Pre-season	GK	(Japan) Yuta Terasawa	(Japan) Nankatsu SC	Full transfer
Pre-season	DF	(Japan) Naoki Watanabe	(Japan) Asia University	Full transfer
Pre-season	DF	(Japan) Felipe Bessa	(Japan) Tokai Gakuen University	Full transfer
Pre-season	DF	(Japan) Malik Fofana	(Japan) Yamanashi Gakuin University	Full transfer
Pre-season	DF	(Japan) Sota Sato	(Japan) Daito Bunka University	Full transfer
Pre-season	DF	(Japan) Yusei Ichikawa	(Japan) Hosei University	Full transfer
Pre-season	MF	(Japan) Ren Shibamoto	(Japan) Gamba Osaka	Full transfer
Pre-season	MF	(Japan) Naoki Hara	(Japan) Shonan Bellmare	Full transfer
Pre-season	MF	(Japan) Kazuma Tsuboi	(Japan) Vanraure Hachinohe	Full transfer
Pre-season	MF	(Japan) Reo Takeshita	(Japan) Rayluck Shiga	Full transfer
Pre-season	MF	(Japan) Hiromi Kakura	(Japan) Kagura Shimane	Full transfer
Pre-season	MF	(Japan) Shota Fujisaki	(Japan) Kochi United	Full transfer
Pre-season	MF	(Japan) Ryuki Yamaguchi	(Japan) Fukuoka University	Full transfer
Pre-season	MF	(Japan) Rikuya Yamada	(Japan) Osaka Gakuin University	Full transfer
Pre-season	MF	(Japan) Ryusei Muraki	(Japan) Tokyo Int. University	Full transfer
Pre-season	MF	(Japan) Raisei Shimazu	(Japan) Zweigen Kanazawa	Full transfer; Loan made permanent
Pre-season	FW	(Japan) Yuto Tsumura	(Japan) Sakushin Gakuin University	Full transfer

Transfers out
Leave on	Pos.	Player	Moving to	Transfer type
Pre-season	GK	(Japan) Niki Kitabatake	–	Contract expiration
Pre-season	DF	(Japan) Yuya Hiyama	(Japan) Rayluck Shiga	Full transfer
Pre-season	DF	(Japan) Kotaro Higashino	(Japan) Roasso Kumamoto	Loan expiration
Pre-season	DF	(Japan) Koki Imakake	–	Contract expiration
Pre-season	DF	(Brazil) João Siqueira	–	Contract expiration
Pre-season	MF	(Japan) Shinya Hattori	(Japan) FC Tokushima	Full transfer
Pre-season	MF	(Japan) Nao Yamamoto	(Japan) FC Tokushima	Full transfer
Pre-season	MF	(Japan) Masato Kurogi	–	Retirement
Pre-season	MF	(Japan) Takahiro Futagawa	–	Retirement
Pre-season	MF	(Cameroon) Noah Fortune	–	Retirement
Pre-season	FW	(Brazil) Yuri Messias	(Bahrain) East Riffa	Full transfer
Pre-season	FW	(Japan) Himan Morimoto	(Japan) Kamatamare Sanuki	Loan transfer
Pre-season	FW	(Japan) Ryusei Ito	–	Retirement

== Tokyo Musashino United ==
Transfers in
Join on	Pos.	Player	Moving from	Transfer type
Pre-season	GK	(Japan) Atsushi Suetsugu	(Japan) Cobaltore Onagawa	Free transfer
Pre-season	GK	(Japan) Takuya Atsumi	(Japan) Sanno Institute of Management	Free transfer
Pre-season	DF	(Japan) Taiki Kikuchi	(Japan) ReinMeer Aomori	Free transfer
Pre-season	DF	(Japan) Riku Yamada	(Japan) Meiji University	Free transfer
Pre-season	DF	(Japan) Haruki Nishimi	(Japan) Tokyo Keizai University	Free transfer
Pre-season	DF	(Japan) Motoya Toyoshima	(Japan) Juntendo University	Free transfer
Pre-season	MF	(Japan) Ryoichi Imamura	(Japan) Nippon SS University	Free transfer
Pre-season	MF	(Japan) Goru Teramoto	(Japan) Sakushin Gakuin University	Free transfer
Pre-season	MF	(Japan) Shuto Hori	(Japan) Kataller Toyama	Loan transfer
Pre-season	FW	(Japan) Daiji Oguchi	(Japan) Rayluck Shiga	Free transfer
Pre-season	FW	(Japan) Taiki Yukutake	(Japan) ReinMeer Aomori	Free transfer

Transfers out
Leave on	Pos.	Player	Moving to	Transfer type
Pre-season	GK	(Japan) Kota Sanada	(Japan) Shonan Bellmare	Loan expiration
Pre-season	DF	(Japan) Tatsuya Kamikaseda	(Japan) Tokyo United	Free transfer
Pre-season	DF	(Japan) Koji Sugiyama	(Japan) Fagiano Okayama	Loan expiration
Pre-season	DF	(Japan) Takanori Kanamori	–	Retirement
Pre-season	MF	(North Korea) Ryang Yong-ju	(Japan) Veertien Mie	Free transfer
Pre-season	MF	(Japan) Kenta Kurishima	(Japan) Tokyo United	Free transfer
Pre-season	MF	(Japan) Yasutaka Suzuki	(Japan) Tokyo United	Free transfer
Pre-season	MF	(Japan) Asahi Yokokawa	(Japan) Shonan Bellmare	Loan expiration
Pre-season	MF	(Japan) Junki Kanai	–	Retirement
Pre-season	MF	(Japan) Yuma Nishioka	–	Retirement
Pre-season	MF	(South Korea) Ko Kyung-te	–	Contract expiration
Pre-season	FW	(Japan) Akira Matsuzawa	(Japan) SC Sagamihara	Full transfer
Pre-season	FW	(Japan) Koki Taguchi	(Japan) Kochi United	Free transfer
Pre-season	FW	(Japan) Koji Takizawa	–	Contract expiration

== Veertien Mie ==
Transfers in
Join on	Pos.	Player	Moving from	Transfer type
Pre-season	GK	(Japan) Shohei Nomura	(Poland) Pogoń Skwierzyna	Free transfer
Pre-season	GK	(Japan) Kota Sanada	(Japan) Shonan Bellmare	Free transfer
Pre-season	DF	(Japan) Hayato Ueda	(Japan) Suzuka Point Getters	Free transfer
Pre-season	DF	(Japan) Kaito Suzuki	(Japan) Yokkaichi University	Free transfer
Pre-season	DF	(Japan) Taisei Ishii	(Japan) Shonan Bellmare	Free transfer
Pre-season	DF	(Japan) Koji Sugiyama	(Japan) Fagiano Okayama	Free transfer
Pre-season	MF	(North Korea) Ryang Yong-ju	(Japan) Tokyo Musashino United	Free transfer
Pre-season	MF	(Japan) Kaito Anzai	(Japan) Vonds Ichihara	Free transfer
Pre-season	MF	(Japan) Shunnosuke Matsuki	(Japan) Fagiano Okayama	Loan transfer
Pre-season	FW	(Japan) Atsushi Yoshida	(Japan) Tochigi City	Free transfer

Transfers out
Leave on	Pos.	Player	Moving to	Transfer type
Pre-season	GK	(Japan) Daiki Kato	(Japan) J-Lease FC	Free transfer
Pre-season	GK	(Japan) Toru Suzuki	–	Retirement
Pre-season	DF	(Japan) Aoto Tamiya	–	Retirement
Pre-season	DF	(Japan) Taichi Okumura	–	Retirement
Pre-season	MF	(Japan) Kotaro Takahashi	(Japan) Boso Rovers Kisarazu	Free transfer
Pre-season	MF	(Japan) Yuki Kozuka	(Japan) Ococias Kyoto	Free transfer
Pre-season	MF	(Japan) Sho Hayasaka	(Japan) Shinagawa CC	Free transfer
Pre-season	MF	(Japan) Jo Inoue	(Japan) Toyama Shinjo	Free transfer
Pre-season	MF	(Japan) Hiroki Terashita	–	Retirement
Pre-season	FW	(Japan) Koichi Sato	–	Retirement
Pre-season	FW	(Japan) Shogo Sakai	–	Retirement

== Verspah Oita ==
Transfers in
Join on	Pos.	Player	Moving from	Transfer type
Pre-season	GK	(Japan) Shun Sato	(Japan) BTOP Thank Kuriyama	Free transfer
Pre-season	DF	(Japan) Konosuke Fukumiya	(Japan) Sony Sendai	Free transfer
Pre-season	DF	(Japan) Hikaru Ishigami	(Japan) Sony Sendai	Free transfer
Pre-season	DF	(Japan) Koji Sugiyama	(Japan) Fagiano Okayama	Loan transfer
Pre-season	MF	(Japan) Kosei Uryu	(Japan) Azul Claro Numazu	Free transfer
Pre-season	MF	(Japan) Yusuke Kaneko	(Japan) Nara Club	Free transfer
Pre-season	MF	(Japan) Tatsumi Hineno	(Japan) Suzuka Point Getters	Free transfer
Pre-season	MF	(Japan) Itsuki Ajima	(Japan) Juntendo University	Free transfer
Pre-season	MF	(Japan) Shunnosuke Matsuki	(Japan) Fagiano Okayama	Loan transfer
Pre-season	FW	(Japan) Kodai Nagashima	(Japan) Nara Club	Free transfer
Pre-season	FW	(Japan) Koya Handa	(Japan) Blaublitz Akita	Loan transfer

Transfers out
Leave on	Pos.	Player	Moving to	Transfer type
Pre-season	GK	(Japan) Yasuhiro Watanabe	–	Contract expiration
Pre-season	DF	(Japan) Takuto Honda	(Japan) J-Lease FC	Free transfer
Pre-season	DF	(Japan) Asahi Yamade	–	Contract expiration
Pre-season	DF	(Japan) Takahiro Urashima	(Japan) Maruyasu Okazaki	Free transfer
Pre-season	DF	(Japan) Kimiaki Nishikawa	–	Contract expiration
Pre-season	MF	(Japan) Rui Tone	(Japan) FC Osaka	Free transfer
Pre-season	MF	(Japan) Shuto Watanabe	(Japan) Maruyasu Okazaki	Free transfer
Pre-season	MF	(Japan) Naoki Tsuchida	(Japan) Shibuya City	Free transfer
Pre-season	MF	(Japan) Tomohiro Ogawa	–	Contract expiration
Pre-season	MF	(Japan) Mitsuaki Nishimura	–	Contract expiration
Pre-season	MF	(Japan) Naoya Yoshida	–	Contract expiration
Pre-season	FW	(Japan) Hiroki Maeda	(Japan) Maruyasu Okazaki	Free transfer

== See also ==
- List of J1 League football transfers winter 2022–23
- List of J2 League football transfers winter 2022–23
- List of J3 League football transfers winter 2022–23
