= 2023 All Japan University Football Championship =

Tournament details
- Country: Japan
- Dates: 7 December 2023 – 24 December 2023
- Teams: 24

Final positions
- Champions: Meiji (4th title)
- Runners-up: Kyoto Sangyo

Tournament statistics
- Matches played: 23
- Goals scored: 69 (3 per match)
- Attendance: 12,895 (561 per match)
- Top goal scorer(s): Ryunosuke Ota (Meiji, 4 goals)

Awards
- Best player: Sota Nakamura (Meiji)

The 2023 All Japan University Football Championship (第72回 全日本大学サッカー選手権大会; All Japan 72nd University Football Championship) was the 72nd edition of the referred annually contested cup for universities across Japan. As usual, the tournament was contested by 24 universities on a knockout-stage format. Meiji clinched their fourth championship title after winning by 2–0 past Kyoto Sangyo, four years after their third title on 2019.

In an unusual movement, champions Meiji were invited to the 2024 Emperor's Cup by the JFA without having to play their prefectural qualifications to fill the vacant spot left by J1 side Urawa Red Diamonds following the riot caused by the fans after 0–3 loss against Nagoya Grampus in the 4th round of the 2023 tournament.

== Calendar ==
Round	Date	Matches	Clubs
First round	7 December 2023	8	16 → 8
Round of 16	10 December 2023	8	16 (8+8) → 8
Quarter-finals	13 December 2023	4	8 → 4
Semi-finals	21 December 2023	2	4 → 2
Final	24 December 2023	1	2 → 1

== Participating clubs ==
In parentheses: Each university's performance at the regional qualifying series.

Region	RP	University	Apps	Located on
Hokkaido	1st	Sapporo University	44th	Sapporo
Hokkaido	2nd	Hokkaido University of Education Iwamizawa	11th	Iwamizawa
Tohoku	1st	Sendai University	39th	Miyagi
Tohoku	2nd	Fuji University	2nd	Iwate
Kanto	1st	University of Tsukuba	41st	Ibaraki
Kanto	2nd	Tokyo International University	3rd	Saitama
Kanto	3rd	Meiji University	22nd	Tokyo
Kanto	4th	Nihon University	4th	Tokyo
Kanto	5th	Ryutsu Keizai University	13th	Ibaraki
Kanto	6th	Toyo University	2nd	Tokyo
Hokushin'etsu	1st	Niigata University of Health and Welfare	9th	Niigata
Tokai	1st	Chukyo University	43rd	Aichi
Tokai	2nd	Tokoha University	14th	Shizuoka
Tokai	3rd	Tokai Gakuen University	7th	Aichi
Kansai	1st	Kyoto Sangyo University	8th	Kyoto
Kansai	2nd	Kansai University	26th	Osaka
Kansai	3rd	Kwansei Gakuin University	25th	Hyogo
Kansai	4th	Osaka Gakuin University	3rd	Osaka
Chugoku	1st	Hiroshima University	14th	Hiroshima
Shikoku	1st	Takamatsu University	4th	Kagawa
Shikoku	2nd	Shikoku Gakuin University	3rd	Kagawa
Kyushu	1st	Fukuoka University	46th	Fukuoka
Kyushu	2nd	National Institute of Fitness and Sports in Kanoya	26th	Kagoshima
Kyushu	3rd	Kyushu Sangyo University	20th	Fukuoka

== Schedule ==
The participating teams and match-ups were disclosed on 21 November 2023.

=== First round ===
7 December 2023 Match 1	Tokoha	0–1	Kanoya	Kita
11:00		Report	Hayato Katayama 32'	Stadium: AGF Field; Attendance: 218

7 December 2023 Match 2	Nihon	4–0	Takamatsu	Kita
14:00	Keita Tanaka 45+2'; Tomohiro Hiraga 58'; Koya Hasegawa 62'; Takeru Chiba 81'	Report		Stadium: AGF Field; Attendance: 157

7 December 2023 Match 3	Fuji	1–4	Hiroshima	Urayasu
11:00	Shuto Motomiya 35'	Report	Rentaro Seguchi 5'; Aoi Nakamura 25', 40', 77'	Stadium: Urayasu Athletic Stadium; Attendance: 164

7 December 2023 Match 4	Kwansei Gakuin	4–0	Hokkaido Iwamizawa	Urayasu
14:00	Sho Uramichi 16', 22', 86'; Sora Mochizuki 90+1'	Report		Stadium: Urayasu Athletic Stadium; Attendance: 155

7 December 2023 Match 5	Osaka Gakuin	1–0	Kyushu Sangyo	Narashino
11:00	Shunya Seki 65'	Report		Stadium: Daiichi Cutter Field; Attendance: 101

7 December 2023 Match 6	Ryutsu Keizai	2–0	Sapporo	Narashino
14:00	Koshi Yagi 61'; Shun Nakajima 65'	Report		Stadium: Daiichi Cutter Field; Attendance: 252

7 December 2023 Match 7	Toyo	3–0	Tokai Gakuen	Ryugasaki
11:00	Rintaro Umetsu 7', 42'; Fuki Yamagishi 79'	Report		Stadium: Ryutsu Keizai University Ryugasaki Field; Attendance: 232

7 December 2023 Match 8	Fukuoka	2–1	Shikoku Gakuin	Ryugasaki
14:00	Shinta Hojo 60'; Yu Hashimoto 83'	Report	Taisei Morimoto 90+7'	Stadium: Ryutsu Keizai University Ryugasaki Field; Attendance: 194

=== Round of 16 ===
10 December 2023 Match 9	Tsukuba	2–1	Kanoya	Kita
11:00	Keita Fukui 30'; Masato Handai 37'	Report	Keishin Yoshikawa 47'	Stadium: AGF Field; Attendance: 591

10 December 2023 Match 10	Nihon	0–1	Chukyo	Kita
14:00		Report	Koya Fujii 90+3'	Stadium: AGF Field; Attendance: 668

10 December 2023 Match 11	Hiroshima	1–3 (a.e.t.)	Sendai	Yokohama
10:30	Motoya Sudani 16'	Report	Sho Sasaki 67'; Koji Wada 98'; Keita Negishi 105+1'	Stadium: Hodogaya Park Soccer Field; Attendance: 384

10 December 2023 Match 12	Meiji	5–3	Kwansei Gakuin	Yokohama
13:30	Ryunosuke Ota 2', 14', 38'; Yosuke Uchida 8'; Issei Kumatoriya 34'	Report	Sora Mochizuki 45+2', 63'; Ken Masui 90'	Stadium: Hodogaya Park Soccer Field; Attendance: 523

10 December 2023 Match 13	Tokyo International	3–1 (a.e.t.)	Osaka Gakuin	Yokohama
11:00	Shuta Hirakawa 7'; Raiki Yoda 96'; Mahiro Sekimoto 105+1'	Report	Hayato Kanda 80'	Stadium: NHK Spring Mitsuzawa Football Stadium; Attendance: 289

10 December 2023 Match 14	Ryutsu Keizai	2–1	Niigata HW	Yokohama
14:00	Izumi Miyata 26', 90+10'	Report	Shota Tanaka 84'	Stadium: NHK Spring Mitsuzawa Football Stadium; Attendance: 676

10 December 2023 Match 15	Toyo	0–2	Kyoto Sangyo	Ryugasaki
11:00		Report	Shohei Ogushi 7' (o.g.); Yamato Natsukawa 9'	Stadium: Ryutsu Keizai University Ryugasaki Field; Attendance: 331

10 December 2023 Match 16	Kansai	2–4	Fukuoka	Ryugasaki
14:00	Masaki Nishimura 37'; Komei Kikuchi 50'	Report	Soma Ito 10'; Shun Isotani 21'; Yu Hashimoto 45+7'; Rintaro Goto 72' (o.g.)	Stadium: Ryutsu Keizai University Ryugasaki Field; Attendance: 517

=== Quarter-finals ===
13 December 2023 Match 17	Tsukuba	2–0	Chukyo	Kita
11:00	Kotaro Uchino 58'; Shunta Sera 90+2'	Report		Stadium: AGF Field; Attendance: 293

13 December 2023 Match 18	Meiji	2–0	Sendai	Urayasu
11:00	Ryunosuke Ota 22'; Ryota Abe 84'	Report		Stadium: Urayasu Athletic Stadium; Attendance: 256

13 December 2023 Match 19	Tokyo International	0–1	Ryutsu Keizai	Narashino
11:00		Report	Izumi Miyata 59'	Stadium: Daiichi Cutter Field; Attendance: 399

13 December 2023 Match 20	Fukuoka	1–2	Kyoto Sangyo	Ryugasaki
11:00	Shinta Hojo 90+4'	Report	Kazuki Fukui 14'; Shimpei Nishiya 28'	Stadium: Ryutsu Keizai University Ryugasaki Field; Attendance: 149

=== Semi-finals ===
21 December 2023 Match 21	Tsukuba	0–1	Meiji	Ryugasaki
11:00		Report	Sota Nakamura 58'	Stadium: Ryutsu Keizai University Ryugasaki Field; Attendance: 680; Referee: Tatsuya Sakai

21 December 2023 Match 22	Ryutsu Keizai	2–2 (a.e.t.) (3–4 p)	Kyoto Sangyo	Ryugasaki
14:00	Sota Matsunaga 36', 81'	Report	Tsubasa Ito 33'; Kazuki Fukui 65'	Stadium: Ryutsu Keizai University Ryugasaki Field; Attendance: 1,157; Referee: Yuki Tanabe
	Penalties
	Izumi Miyata (penalty missed); Yuto Kawabata (penalty scored); Yutaro Maruyama (penalty scored); Yuto Utsugi (penalty scored); Kento Mitsuhiro (penalty missed)		(penalty missed) Yosei Kawakami; (penalty scored) Kota Yokokubo; (penalty scored) Ayumu Nakano; (penalty scored) Kazuki Fukui; (penalty scored) Soma Meshino

=== Final ===
24 December 2023
12:00
Match 23

Meiji	2–0	Kyoto Sangyo
Sota Nakamura 48'; Katsuyuki Tanaka 53'	Report

Kashima Soccer Stadium, Kashima
Attendance: 4,509
Referee: Keigo Sendachi

GK	1	(Japan) Go Kambayashi
DF	2	(Japan) Miki Inoue (c)
DF	3	(Japan) Yosuke Murakami	(substituted off) 70'
DF	4	(Japan) Teppei Oka
MF	5	(Japan) Ryota Abe
MF	8	(Japan) Issei Kumatoriya	(substituted off) 83'
MF	12	(Japan) Yosuke Uchida
MF	15	(Japan) Tatsuya Kiuchi	(substituted off) 46'
MF	17	(Japan) Kyota Tokiwa	(substituted off) 90+1'
FW	10	(Japan) Sota Nakamura	(substituted off) 70'
FW	11	(Japan) Ryunosuke Ota
Substitutes:
GK	21	(Japan) Kenya Kubo
DF	22	(Japan) Seiga Sumi	(substituted in) 70'
DF	31	(Japan) Atsushi Inagaki
MF	7	(Japan) Katsuyuki Tanaka	(substituted in) 46'
MF	9	(Japan) Sota Fujimori
MF	20	(Japan) Naoya Mishina	(substituted in) 83'
MF	24	(Japan) Kim Song-min	(substituted in) 90+1'
FW	18	(Japan) Hayato Manabe	(substituted in) 70'
FW	33	(Japan) Junya Baba
Manager:
(Japan) Daisuke Kurita

GK	1	(Japan) Toi Yamamoto
DF	2	(Japan) Shimpei Nishiya
DF	4	(Japan) Sho Nishimura
DF	5	(Japan) Kota Yokokubo
DF	25	(Japan) Kai Kusunose	(substituted off) 66'
MF	6	(Japan) Yosei Kawakami
MF	7	(Japan) Kazuki Fukui
MF	11	(Japan) Yamato Natsukawa	(substituted off) 59'
MF	20	(Japan) Tsubasa Ito
FW	9	(Japan) Taketo Kanno	(substituted off) 70'
FW	10	(Japan) Soma Meshino (c)
Substitutes:
GK	12	(Japan) Kentaro Hayashi
DF	3	(Japan) Yukio Sato
DF	24	(Japan) Narumu Ono
MF	14	(Japan) Kota Shiromizu
MF	15	(Japan) Ora Ishihara	(substituted in) 66'
MF	28	(Japan) Haruto Takiguchi
MF	29	(Japan) Seigo Suetani	(substituted in) 70'
MF	30	(Japan) Ko Tashiro
FW	8	(Japan) Ayumu Nakano	(substituted in) 59'
Manager:
(Japan) Takuya Yoshikawa

Assistant referees:
Yuri Sasaki
Seigo Nakajima
Fourth official:
Fuyuhi Hachiya

Match rules

- 90 minutes.
- Extra-time of 15 minutes for each half if scores still level.
- Persisting a draw after extra-time, a penalty shoot-out would be held.
- Nine named substitutes.
- Maximum of five substitutions.

== Top scorers ==
Rank	Player	University	Goals
1	(Japan) Ryunosuke Ota	Meiji	4
2	(Japan) Izumi Miyata	Ryutsu Keizai	3
2	(Japan) Sora Mochizuki	Kwansei Gakuin	3
2	(Japan) Aoi Nakamura	Hiroshima	3
2	(Japan) Sho Uramichi	Kwansei Gakuin	3

== Awards ==
Award	Player	Grade	University
Best Player	(Japan) Sota Nakamura	3rd	Meiji
Best Goalkeeper	(Japan) Go Kambayashi	3rd	Meiji
Best Defender	(Japan) Miki Inoue	4th	Meiji
Best Midfielder	(Japan) Kazuki Fukui	4th	Kyoto Sangyo
Best Forward	(Japan) Soma Meshino	4th	Kyoto Sangyo

== Joining J.League clubs on 2024 ==
Pos.	Player	Moving from	Moving to	League
GK	Kohei Kawakami	Toyo	Fagiano Okayama	J2
GK	Kenya Kubo	Meiji	Zweigen Kanazawa	J3
GK	Keitaro Nakajima	Tokoha	Júbilo Iwata	J1
GK	Kazuaki Suganuma	Fukuoka	Avispa Fukuoka	J1
GK	Shioki Takayama	Tsukuba	Vissel Kobe	J1
GK	Toi Yamamoto	Kyoto Sangyo	FC Osaka	J3
DF	Ryota Abe	Meiji	FC Imabari	J3
DF	Hayato Aoki	Nihon	Tokushima Vortis	J2
DF	Keishi Fujimoto	Tokai Gakuen	Tegevajaro Miyazaki	J3
DF	Kaito Hayashida	Tsukuba	FC Osaka	J3
DF	Miki Inoue	Meiji	Ventforet Kofu	J2
DF	Rikuto Ishio	Sendai	Vegalta Sendai	J2
DF	Yuki Kobayashi	Nihon	Nagano Parceiro	J3
DF	Yosuke Murakami	Meiji	Omiya Ardija	J3
DF	Shimpei Nishiya	Kyoto Sangyo	Kataller Toyama	J3
DF	Kimito Nono	Kwansei Gakuin	Kashima Antlers	J1
DF	Teppei Oka	Meiji	FC Tokyo	J1
DF	Yamato Okada	Fukuoka	Hokkaido Consadole Sapporo	J1
DF	Jo Soma	Sendai	Montedio Yamagata	J2
DF	Ryota Tagashira	Toyo	Thespa Gunma	J2
DF	Naoya Takahashi	Kansai	Shonan Bellmare	J1
DF	Kaio Yabunaka	Fuji	Iwate Grulla Morioka	J3
DF	Manato Yoshida	Kanoya	Yokohama F. Marinos	J1
DF	Takeshi Yoshimoto	Kansai	FC Ryukyu	J3
MF	Koya Fujii	Chukyo	Roasso Kumamoto	J2
MF	Kazuki Fukui	Kyoto Sangyo	SC Sagamihara	J3
MF	Naoki Hashida	Nihon	Nagano Parceiro	J3
MF	Kazuaki Ihori	Tokai Gakuen	Kagoshima United	J2
MF	Chihiro Konagaya	Tokoha	Roasso Kumamoto	J2
MF	Arata Kozakai	Chukyo	Oita Trinita	J2
MF	Kazuki Kumasaka	Tokyo International	Kashiwa Reysol	J1
MF	Rio Maeda	Ryutsu Keizai	Matsumoto Yamaga	J3
MF	Shoma Maeda	Tokoha	Fujieda MYFC	J2
MF	Ken Masui	Kwansei Gakuin	Nagoya Grampus	J1
MF	Rin Mito	Kwansei Gakuin	Gamba Osaka	J1
MF	Izumi Miyata	Ryutsu Keizai	Yokohama FC	J2
MF	Soma Meshino	Kyoto Sangyo	Tokyo Verdy	J1
MF	Hinata Mukai	Sapporo	Azul Claro Numazu	J3
MF	Yuto Nagao	Kwansei Gakuin	Mito HollyHock	J2
MF	Kanta Nagata	Chukyo	Fujieda MYFC	J2
MF	Yamato Natsukawa	Kyoto Sangyo	FC Osaka	J3
MF	Kosei Numata	Niigata HW	Azul Claro Numazu	J3
MF	Kanta Sakagishi	Niigata HW	Iwaki FC	J2
MF	Shunta Sera	Tsukuba	Kataller Toyama	J3
MF	Masato Shigemi	Fukuoka	Avispa Fukuoka	J1
MF	Yusuke Shimizu	Toyo	Omiya Ardija	J3
MF	Ukyo Takase	Tokoha	Tegevajaro Miyazaki	J3
MF	Taishi Tamashiro	Sendai	Thespa Gunma	J2
MF	Katsuyuki Tanaka	Meiji	Hokkaido Consadole Sapporo	J1
MF	Masashi Tanioka	Kansai	Ehime FC	J2
MF	Mio Tsuneyasu	Tokai Gakuen	Gainare Tottori	J3
MF	Soichiro Tsutsumi	Kansai	FC Osaka	J3
MF	Kakeru Yamauchi	Tsukuba	Vissel Kobe	J1
MF	Kowa Yonaha	Sendai	FC Gifu	J3
FW	Bae Seong-min	Kyushu Sangyo	Roasso Kumamoto	J2
FW	Manato Hyakuda	Kansai	Nara Club	J3
FW	Kim Hyun-woo	Tokoha	Oita Trinita	J2
FW	Sora Mochizuki	Kwansei Gakuin	FC Osaka	J3
FW	Masaki Nishimura	Kansai	FC Osaka	J3
FW	Ryunosuke Ota	Meiji	Fagiano Okayama	J2
FW	Ryota Sawazaki	Osaka Gakuin	FC Osaka	J3
FW	Shota Tanaka	Niigata HW	Gainare Tottori	J3
FW	Soki Tokuno	Sendai	Mito HollyHock	J2
FW	Shosei Usui	Chukyo	Kataller Toyama	J3
FW	Sota Watanabe	Kwansei Gakuin	Giravanz Kitakyushu	J3

== See also ==
- 2023 All Japan High School Soccer Tournament
