= Meshino =

Meshino (written: 食野) is a Japanese surname. Notable people with the surname include:

- Ryotaro Meshino (食野 亮太郎; born 1998), Japanese footballer
- Soma Meshino (食野 壮磨; born 2001), Japanese footballer
