= Power harassment =

Form of harassment

Power harassment is a form of harassment and workplace bullying in which someone in a position of greater power uses that power unjustifiably against a lower-ranking person, typically just for a display of dominance. It includes a range of behavior from mild irritation and annoyances to serious abuses which can even involve forced activity beyond the boundaries of the job description. Prohibited in some countries, power harassment is considered a form of illegal discrimination and political and psychological abuse. Types of power harassment include physical or psychological attacks, segregation, excessive or demeaning work assignments, and intrusion upon the victim's personal life.

Power harassment may combine with other forms of bullying and harassment, including sexual harassment, public humiliation, character assassination, robbery, property damage and even assault. In the context of sexual harassment, power harassment is distinguished from contra power harassment, in which the harasser is of lower rank than that of the victim, and peer harassment, in which the victim and harasser are of the same rank. The term "political power harassment" was coined by Ramona Rush in a 1993 paper on sexual harassment in academia. Because it operates to reinforce and justify an existing hierarchy, political power harassment can be difficult to assess.

== By country ==
=== Japan ===
Although power harassment is not unique to Japan, it has received significant attention in Japan as a policy and legal problem since the 1990s. A government survey in 2016 found that more than 30% of workers had experienced power harassment in the preceding three years. The Japanese term "power harassment" (パワー・ハラスメント pawa harasumento, often shortened to pawahara) was independently coined by Yasuko Okada of Tokoha Gakuen Junior College in 2002. The Japanese courts have applied the general compensation principle of Article 709 of the Civil Code of Japan to compensate victims of workplace bullying and power harassment.

In 2019, the National Diet adopted the Power Harassment Prevention Act, which amends the Labor Policy Comprehensive Promotion Act to require employers to address power harassment. The 2019 act creates a new Chapter 8 that addresses “remarks and behavior of people taking advantage of their superior positions in the workplace that exceed what is necessary and appropriate for the conduct of business, thereby harming the working environment of employees.” The law took effect for large employers on June 1, 2020. It prohibits the retaliatory discharge of employees who complain about power harassment and requires employers to put systems in place for reporting and addressing power harassment.

=== South Korea ===
The topic of power harassment is known in South Korea as Gapjil, and it has been recently increasingly discussed in Korean society.

== See also ==
- Abuse of power
- Karoshi
- Rankism
- Workplace bullying
- Custodial rape
