= Reo Takeshita =

Japanese footballer

Reo Takeshita 竹下 玲王
Personal information
- Full name: Reo Takeshita
- Date of birth: 4 October 1995 (age 31)
- Place of birth: Shizuoka, Japan
- Height: 1.78 m (5 ft 10 in)
- Position: Forward

Team information
- Current team: Tiamo Hirakata
- Number: 9

Youth career
- 2014–2017: Kansai University

Senior career*
Years	Team	Apps	(Gls)
2018–2019	Nagano Parceiro	37	(3)
2020–2022	MIO Biwako Shiga	51	(13)
2023–	Tiamo Hirakata	0	(0)
- * Club domestic league appearances and goals as of 20 November 2022, 16:27 (UTC)

Reo Takeshita (竹下 玲王, Takeshita Reo; born October 4, 1995) is a Japanese football player, who plays as a forward for JFL club Tiamo Hirakata.

== Club career ==
After attending the football team section of the Kansai University, Reo Takeshita joined Nagano Parceiro in December 2017.

In 2020, Takeshita joined JFL club MIO Biwako Shiga. He left the club on 2022, after the expiration of his two-year contract with the club.

In 2022, Takeshita joined JFL club Tiamo Hirakata for the upcoming 2023 season.

== Personal life ==
Born in Shizuoka, he has a Brazilian mother.

== Career statistics ==
=== Club ===
As of the start of 2023 season.

Club performance			League		Cup		Total	
Season	Club	League	Apps	Goals	Apps	Goals	Apps	Goals
Japan			League		Emperor's Cup		Total	
2018	Nagano Parceiro	J3 League	12	3	1	0	13	3
2019	Nagano Parceiro	J3 League	25	0	2	0	27	0
2020	MIO Biwako Shiga	JFL	10	1	2	0	12	1
2021	MIO Biwako Shiga	JFL	26	9	0	0	26	9
2022	MIO Biwako Shiga	JFL	15	3	0	0	15	3
2023	Tiamo Hirakata	JFL	0	0	0	0	0	0
Total			88	16	6	1	89	17
