= Tokoha Gakuen Junior College =

Private junior college in Aoi-ku, Shizuoka City, Japan

Coordinates: 35°00′44″N 138°25′50″E

- 常葉学園短期大学
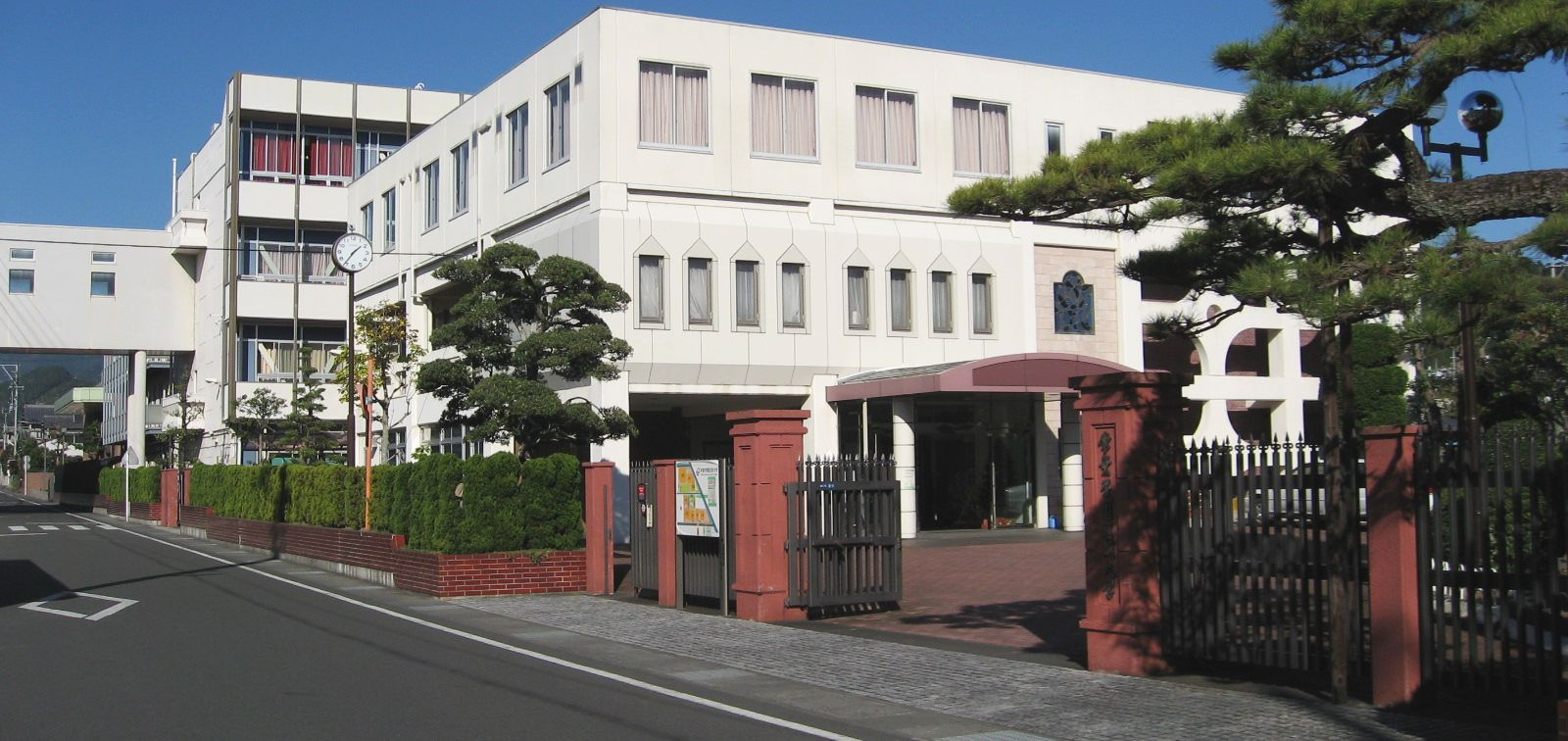
- Tokoha Gakuen Junior College
- Type: Private
- Established: 1966
- Location: Aoi-ku, Shizuoka, Japan

Tokoha Gakuen Junior College (常葉学園短期大学, Tokoha Gakuen Tanki Daigaku) is a co-educational private junior college in Aoi-ku, Shizuoka City, Japan.

Founded in 1966 as a junior women's college, it started admitting male students into the art and design program in 1978 and then into the music program in 1996. The college is operated by the foundation that also operates Tokoha Gakuen University.
