= Yamato Wakatsuki =

Japanese footballer (born 2002)

Personal information
- Full name: Yamato Wakatsuki
- Date of birth: 18 January 2002 (age 24)
- Place of birth: Midori, Gunma, Japan
- Height: 1.70 m (5 ft 7 in)
- Position: Forward

Team information
- Current team: Albirex Niigata
- Number: 18

Youth career
- Liberty Omama SC
- Maebashi SC
- 2017–2019: Kiryu Daiichi High School

Senior career*
| Years | Team | Apps | (Gls) |
| 2019–2024 | Shonan Bellmare | 9 | (0) |
| 2020–2021 | → Sion (loan) | 17 | (1) |
| 2020 | → Sion U21 (loan) | 14 | (2) |
| 2024 | Renofa Yamaguchi FC | 34 | (6) |
| 2025– | Albirex Niigata | 30 | (4) |

International career
| 2018–2019 | Japan U17 | 9 | (6) |
- * Club domestic league appearances and goals as of 16 August 2026

Yamato Wakatsuki (若月 大和, Wakatsuki Yamato; born 18 January 2002) is a Japanese footballer who plays as a forward for Albirex Niigata.

== Career ==
=== Shonan Bellmare ===
On 8 March 2019, it was announced that Wakatsuki would join the team as a specially designated player for the 2019 season. It was also announced that he would join the senior team permanently in the 2020 season. He made his league debut against Vissel Kobe on 26 May 2019. Wakatsuki scored his first goal in the Emperor's Cup against BTOP Hokkaido on 7 June 2023, scoring in the 82nd minute.

=== Loan to Sion ===
On 28 January 2020, Wakatsuki was announced at FC Sion. He made his league debut against FC Luzern on 2 July 2020. Wakatsuki scored his first league goal against Servette on 14 March 2021, scoring in the 84th minute. On 28 December 2021, it was announced that his loan would be expiring and he would be returning to Shonan.

=== Renofa Yamaguchi ===
On 20 December 2023, Wakatsuki was announced at Renofa Yamaguchi FC. He made his league debut against Yokohama FC on 24 February 2024. Wakatsuki scored his first league goal against Montedio Yamagata on 6 May 2024, scoring in the 39th minute.

=== Albirex Niigata ===
On 27 December 2024, Wakatsuki was announced at Albirex Niigata.

== International career ==
In October 2019, Wakatsuki was called up to the 2019 FIFA U-17 World Cup. He scored a brace in the opening group stage match against Netherlands U17s on 28 October 2019.

== Career statistics ==
As of 28 March 2021

| Club | Season | League | | | National Cup | | League Cup | | Continental | | Other | | Total | |
| Club | Season | Division | Apps | Goals | Apps | Goals | Apps | Goals | Apps | Goals | Apps | Goals | Apps | Goals |
|---|---|---|---|---|---|---|---|---|---|---|---|---|---|---|
| Shonan Bellmare | 2019 | J1 League | 1 | 0 | 0 | 0 | 1 (Note: Appearances in the J. League Cup) | 0 | – | | 1 (Note: Appearances in the J.League Cup / Copa Sudamericana Championship) | 0 | 3 | 0 |
| Shonan Bellmare | 2020 | J1 League | 0 | 0 | 0 | 0 | 0 | 0 | – | | 0 | 0 | 0 | 0 |
| Shonan Bellmare | 2021 | J1 League | 0 | 0 | 0 | 0 | 0 | 0 | – | | 0 | 0 | 0 | 0 |
| Shonan Bellmare | Total | | 1 | 0 | 0 | 0 | 1 | 0 | 0 | 0 | 1 | 0 | 3 | 0 |
| Sion (loan) | 2019–20 | Swiss Super League | 1 | 0 | 0 | 0 | – | | – | | 0 | 0 | 1 | 0 |
| Sion (loan) | 2020–21 | Swiss Super League | 14 | 1 | 1 (Note: Appearances in the Swiss Cup) | 0 | – | | – | | 0 | 0 | 15 | 1 |
| Sion (loan) | Total | | 15 | 1 | 1 | 0 | 0 | 0 | 0 | 0 | 0 | 0 | 16 | 1 |
| Sion U21 (loan) | 2020–21 | Swiss Promotion League | 3 | 0 | – | | – | | – | | 0 | 0 | 3 | 0 |
| Career total | | | 19 | 1 | 0 | 0 | 1 | 0 | 0 | 0 | 1 | 0 | 21 | 1 |
