= Kodai Sakamoto =

Japanese footballer (born 1995)

Kodai Sakamoto 坂本 広大
Personal information
- Date of birth: 20 September 1995 (age 31)
- Place of birth: Kumamoto, Japan
- Height: 1.75 m (5 ft 9 in)
- Position: Midfielder

Team information
- Current team: MIO Biwako Shiga

Youth career
- 2014–2017: Chukyo University

Senior career*
Years	Team	Apps	(Gls)
2018–2020	Roasso Kumamoto	28	(2)
2021–2022	Suzuka Point Getters	25	(2)
2023–	MIO Biwako Shiga	0	(0)
- * Club domestic league appearances and goals as of 11 January 2023, 19:03 (UTC)

Kodai Sakamoto (坂本 広大, Sakamoto Kōdai; born 20 September 1995) is a Japanese footballer who plays for MIO Biwako Shiga.

== Career ==
Sakamoto was born in Kumamoto. After playing for Chukyo University's football team, he signed for his hometown club Roasso Kumamoto ahead of the 2018 season.

Sakamoto joined JFL club Suzuka Point Getters in 19 January 2021.

On 11 January 2023, Sakamoto was announced as a new signing of MIO Biwako Shiga, which had signed three other teammates from Suzuka for the 2023 season.

== Career statistics ==
As of start from 2023 season

Appearances and goals by club, season and competition
Club	Season	League			Emperor's Cup		Total	
Club	Season	Division	Apps	Goals	Apps	Goals	Apps	Goals
Roasso Kumamoto	2018	J2 League	10	2	1	0	11	2
Roasso Kumamoto	2019	J3 League	9	0	1	0	10	0
Roasso Kumamoto	2020	J3 League	9	0	—		9	0
Roasso Kumamoto	Total		28	2	2	0	30	2
Suzuka Point Getters	2021	Japan Football League	10	1	1	0	11	1
Suzuka Point Getters	2022	Japan Football League	15	1	—		15	1
Suzuka Point Getters	Total		25	2	1	0	26	2
MIO Biwako Shiga	2023	Japan Football League	0	0	0	0	0	0
Career total			53	4	3	0	56	4
