= Shun Hirayama =

Japanese footballer

Personal information
- Date of birth: 6 October 1998 (age 28)
- Place of birth: Asaka, Saitama, Japan
- Height: 1.81 m (5 ft 11 in)
- Position: Forward

Team information
- Current team: FC Tiamo Hirakata

Youth career
- Niiza Ace
- 2014–2016: Mitsubishi Yowa
- 2017–2020: Hosei University

Senior career*
Years	Team	Apps	(Gls)
2021–2024	Giravanz Kitakyushu	72	(6)
2025–	FC Tiamo Hirakata		
- * Club domestic league appearances and goals as of 9 January 2025

Shun Hirayama (平山 駿, Hirayama Shun; born 6 October 1998) is a Japanese footballer currently playing as a forward for FC Tiamo Hirakata.

== Career statistics ==
=== Club ===
As of 9 January 2025.

Club	Season	League			National Cup		League Cup		Other		Total	
Club	Season	Division	Apps	Goals	Apps	Goals	Apps	Goals	Apps	Goals	Apps	Goals
Hosei University	2019	–			4 (Note: Appearances in the Emperor's Cup)	0	–		0	0	4	0
Giravanz Kitakyushu	2021	J2 League	20	0	0	0	-		-		20	0
Giravanz Kitakyushu	2022	J3 League	17	4	0	0	-		-		17	4
Giravanz Kitakyushu	2023	J3 League	21	2	0	0	-		-		21	2
Giravanz Kitakyushu	2024	J3 League	14	0	2	1	2	0	-		18	1
FC Tiamo Hirakata	2025	JFL					-		-			
Career total			72	6	6	1	2	0	0	0	80	7
