= Yuki Morikawa =

Japanese footballer (born 1993)

Yuki Morikawa 森川裕基
Personal information
- Full name: Yuki Morikawa
- Date of birth: January 7, 1993 (age 33)
- Place of birth: Kyoto, Japan
- Height: 1.76 m (5 ft 9 1/2 in)
- Position: Forward

Team information
- Current team: Kamatamare Sanuki
- Number: 60

Youth career
- Minami-Uzumasa SSS
- Kyoto Shiko SC
- 2008–2010: Rakuhoku High School

College career
Years	Team	Apps	(Gls)
2011–2014	Ritsumeikan University		

Senior career*
Years	Team	Apps	(Gls)
2015–2021	Kamatamare Sanuki	107	(8)
2021–2024	Nagano Parceiro	72	(6)
2024	→ Kamatamare Sanuki (loan)	18	(4)
2025–	Kamatamare Sanuki	36	(3)
- * Club domestic league appearances and goals as of 17 August 2026

Yuki Morikawa (森川 裕基, Morikawa Yūki; born January 7, 1993, in Kyoto) is a Japanese football player who currently plays for Kamatamare Sanuki.

== Playing career ==
=== First spell at Kamatamare Sanuki ===
Morikawa made his debut for Kamatamare on 29 April 2015, coming on in the 81st minute for Keigo Numata. He scored his first goal against Matsumoto Yamaga on 5 November 2017, scoring in the 60th minute. On 27 July 2019, Morikawa scored the 3,500th goal in the J3 League.

=== Nagano Parceiro ===
On 30 December 2020, Morikawa was announced at Nagano Parceiro. He made his debut for Nagano against his old club, Kamatamare Sanuki, on 14 March 2021. He scored his first goals for Nagano on 13 June 2021, scoring a brace against Gainare Tottori.

=== Loan to Kamatamare Sanuki ===
On 1 July 2024, Morikawa joined Kamatamare Sanuki on loan. He made his league debut against Omiya Ardija on 13 July 2024. He scored his first league goal against Grulla Morioka on 1 September 2024, scoring in the 10th minute.

=== Kamatamare Sanuki ===
On 26 December 2024, it was announced that Morikawa's loan contract had expired and he would join Kamatamare Sanuki permanently from the 2025 season.

== Career statistics ==
Updated to 22 February 2018.

Appearances and goals by club, season and competition
Club	Season	League			Emperor's Cup		Total	
Club	Season	Division	Apps	Goals	Apps	Goals	Apps	Goals
Kamatamare Sanuki	2015	J2 League	6	0	2	1	8	1
Kamatamare Sanuki	2016	J2 League	11	0	2	0	13	0
Kamatamare Sanuki	2017	J2 League	6	1	1	1	7	2
Career total			23	1	5	2	28	3
