= Yuya Taguchi =

Japanese footballer

Personal information
- Full name: Yuga Taguchi
- Date of birth: 8 April 2001 (age 25)
- Place of birth: Mie, Japan
- Height: 1.78 m (5 ft 10 in)
- Position: Forward

Team information
- Current team: Matsumoto Yamaga FC
- Number: 17

Youth career
- –2013: Oyamada SSS
- 2014–2016: Cerezo Osaka
- 2017–2019: Yokkaichi Chuo Kogyo High School

Senior career*
Years	Team	Apps	(Gls)
2020–2023	Gainare Tottori	84	(21)
2023–2024	FC Gifu	53	(14)
2024	Zweigen Kanazawa	13	(1)
2025–2026	Ehime FC	51	(8)
2026–	Matsumoto Yamaga FC	3	(1)
- * Club domestic league appearances and goals as of 24 August 2026

Yuya Taguchi (田口 裕也, Taguchi Yuya; born 8 April 2001) is a Japanese footballer who plays as a forward for Matsumoto Yamaga FC.

== Career statistics ==
=== Club ===
As of 29 March 2021.

Club	Season	League			National Cup		League Cup		Other		Total	
Club	Season	Division	Apps	Goals	Apps	Goals	Apps	Goals	Apps	Goals	Apps	Goals
Gainare Tottori	2020	J3 League	30	8	0	0	–		0	0	30	8
Gainare Tottori	2020	J3 League	3	1	0	0	–		0	0	3	1
Career total			33	9	0	0	0	0	0	0	33	9
