= Takayuki Arakaki =

Japanese footballer

Personal information
- Date of birth: 12 August 1996 (age 30)
- Place of birth: Okinawa, Japan
- Height: 1.71 m (5 ft 7 in)
- Position: Midfielder

Youth career
- 2012–2014: RKU Kashiwa High School

College career
Years	Team	Apps	(Gls)
2015–2018	Ryutsu Keizai University		

Senior career*
Years	Team	Apps	(Gls)
2019–2021	Giravanz Kitakyushu	95	(7)
2022–2024	Montedio Yamagata	11	(0)
2024	→ FC Gifu (loan)	27	(2)
- * Club domestic league appearances and goals

Takayuki Arakaki (新垣 貴之, Arakaki Takayuki; born 12 August 1996) is a Japanese former professional footballer who played as a midfielder.
