= Keita Takami =

Japanese footballer (born 1993)

Keita Takami 高見 啓太
Personal information
- Date of birth: 30 July 1993 (age 33)
- Place of birth: Hyōgo, Japan
- Height: 1.68 m (5 ft 6 in)
- Position: Midfielder

Team information
- Current team: Suzuka Point Getters

Youth career
- Tatsuno Nishi Junior HS
- 2009–2011: Vissel Kobe
- 2012–2015: Kokushikan University

Senior career*
Years	Team	Apps	(Gls)
2016–2021	Vanraure Hachinohe	128	(13)
2022	MIO Biwako Shiga	26	(1)
2023–	Suzuka Point Getters	0	(0)
- * Club domestic league appearances and goals as of 24 January 2023, 16:20 (UTC)

Keita Takami (高見 啓太, Takami Keita; born 30 July 1993) is a Japanese footballer who playing as a midfielder. He currently play for Suzuka Point Getters.

== Career statistics ==
=== Club ===
As of start of 2023 season.

Club	Season	League			National Cup		League Cup		Other		Total	
Club	Season	Division	Apps	Goals	Apps	Goals	Apps	Goals	Apps	Goals	Apps	Goals
Vanraure Hachinohe	2016	JFL	25	1	1 (Note: Appearances in the Emperor's Cup)	0	–		0	0	26	1
Vanraure Hachinohe	2017	JFL	30	7	3	0	–		0	0	33	7
Vanraure Hachinohe	2018	JFL	11	1	0	0	–		0	0	11	1
Vanraure Hachinohe	2019	J3 League	11	2	2	0	–		0	0	13	2
Vanraure Hachinohe	2020	J3 League	34	2	0	0	–		0	0	34	2
Vanraure Hachinohe	2021	J3 League	17	0	1	0	–		0	0	18	0
MIO Biwako Shiga	2022	JFL	26	1	1	0	–		0	0	27	1
Suzuka Point Getters	2023	JFL	0	0	0	0	–		0	0	0	0
Career total			154	14	8	0	0	0	0	0	162	14
