= Mahiro Ano =

Japanese footballer (born 2003)

Mahiro Ano 阿野 真拓
Personal information
- Date of birth: 30 August 2003 (age 23)
- Place of birth: Tochigi, Japan
- Height: 1.58 m (5 ft 2 in)
- Position: Midfielder

Team information
- Current team: Tegevajaro Miyazaki
- Number: 7

Youth career
- Minamikawachi SSS
- –2020: Tokyo Verdy

Senior career*
Years	Team	Apps	(Gls)
2020–2024	Tokyo Verdy	27	(0)
2022–2023	→ Fukui United FC (loan)	18	(8)
2024	→ Tegevajaro Miyazaki (loan)	35	(3)
2025–	Tegevajaro Miyazaki	53	(9)
- * Club domestic league appearances and goals as of 16 August 2026

Mahiro Ano (阿野 真拓, Ano Mahiro; born 30 August 2003) is a Japanese footballer currently playing as a midfielder for J2 League club Tegevajaro Miyazaki.

== Career statistics ==
=== Club ===
As of 6 June 2024

Appearances and goals by club, season and competition
Club	Season	League			National Cup		League Cup		Other		Total	
Club	Season	Division	Apps	Goals	Apps	Goals	Apps	Goals	Apps	Goals	Apps	Goals
Japan			League		Emperor's Cup		J. League Cup		Other		Total	
Tokyo Verdy	2020	J2 League	2	0	0	0	–		–		2	0
Tokyo Verdy	2021	J2 League	8	0	0	0	–		–		8	0
Tokyo Verdy	2022	J2 League	17	0	1	0	–		–		18	0
Tokyo Verdy	Total		27	0	1	0	0	0	0	0	28	0
Fukui United FC (loan)	2022	HFL	4	1	0	0	–		1 (Note: Appearances in the Japanese Regional Football Champions League)	0	4	1
Fukui United FC (loan)	2023	HFL	14	7	1	0	–		3	1	4	1
Fukui United FC (loan)	Total		18	8	1	0	0	0	4	1	23	9
Tegevajaro Miyazaki (loan)	2024	J3 League	15	0	1	1	1	0	0	0	17	1
Career total			60	8	3	1	1	0	4	1	68	10
