= Shunnosuke Matsuki =

Japanese footballer (born 1996)

Personal information
- Date of birth: 24 October 1996 (age 30)
- Place of birth: Kanagawa, Japan
- Height: 1.70 m (5 ft 7 in)
- Position: Midfielder

Team information
- Current team: Fujieda MYFC
- Number: 7

Youth career
- Azamino FC
- Yokohama FC
- 2013–2015: Aomori Yamada High School

College career
Years	Team	Apps	(Gls)
2015–2018	Keio University		

Senior career*
Years	Team	Apps	(Gls)
2019–20224	Fagiano Okayama	19	(0)
2021	→ Suzuka Point Getters (loan)	15	(4)
2022	→ Suzuka Point Getters (loan)	15	(2)
2023	→ Verspah Oita (loan)	27	(3)
2024–2025	Gainare Tottori	32	(11)
2025–	Fujieda MYFC	46	(3)
- * Club domestic league appearances and goals as of 13 August 2026

Shunnosuke Matsuki (松木 駿之介, Matsuki Shunnosuke; born 24 October 1996) is a Japanese professional footballer who plays as a midfielder for Fujieda MYFC.

== Career statistics ==
As of 10 November 2020.

Appearances and goals by club, season and competition
Club	Season	League			National Cup		League Cup		Other		Total	
Club	Season	Division	Apps	Goals	Apps	Goals	Apps	Goals	Apps	Goals	Apps	Goals
Fagiano Okayama	2019	J2 League	0	0	0	0	0	0	0	0	0	0
Fagiano Okayama	2020	J2 League	16	0	0	0	0	0	0	0	16	0
Fagiano Okayama	2021	J2 League	0	0	0	0	0	0	0	0	0	0
Fagiano Okayama	2022	J2 League	0	0	0	0	0	0	0	0	0	0
Suzuka Point Getters	2022	Japan Football League	0	0	0	0	0	0	0	0	0	0
Career total			16	0	0	0	0	0	0	0	16	0
