= Soma Meshino =

Japanese footballer

Personal information
- Date of birth: 20 May 2001 (age 25)
- Place of birth: Osaka, Japan
- Height: 1.68 m (5 ft 6 in)
- Position: Midfielder

Team information
- Current team: Tokyo Verdy
- Number: 20

Youth career
- Joinus FC
- –2019: Gamba Osaka

College career
Years	Team	Apps	(Gls)
2020–2023	Kyoto Sangyo University		

Senior career*
Years	Team	Apps	(Gls)
2019	Gamba Osaka U-23	10	(1)
2023–	Tokyo Verdy	26	(0)
2026	→ Tochigi SC (loan)	14	(1)
- * Club domestic league appearances and goals as of 8 August 2026

Soma Meshino (食野 壮磨, Meshino Sōma; born 20 May 2001) is a Japanese footballer who currently plays for Tokyo Verdy.

== Career ==
Meshino made his debut for Osaka Under 23s against YSCC Yokohama on 31 March 2019, coming on for Reo Takae in the 87th minute. He scored on his debut in the 90th minute.

== Career statistics ==
=== Club ===
As of 20 November 2020.

Club	Season	League			National Cup		League Cup		Other		Total	
Club	Season	Division	Apps	Goals	Apps	Goals	Apps	Goals	Apps	Goals	Apps	Goals
Gamba Osaka U-23	2019	J3 League	10	1	0	0	0	0	0	0	10	1
Career total			10	1	0	0	0	0	0	0	10	1
