= Tokoha University =

Coordinates: 35°00′48.7″N 138°25′35.6″E

- 常葉大学
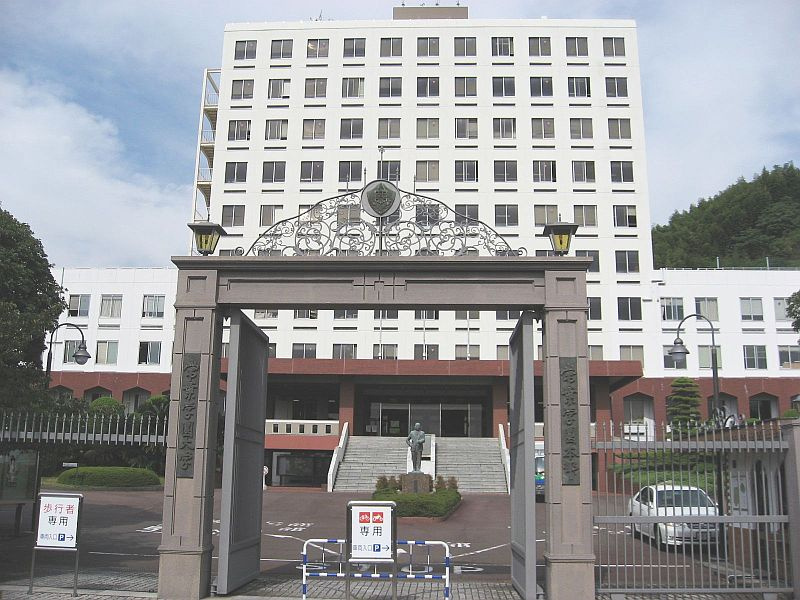
- Tokoha University
- Type: Private
- Established: 1946; university from 1980
- Location: Aoi-ku, Shizuoka, Japan

Tokoha University (常葉大学, Tokoha Daigaku) is a private university in the Aoi ward of Shizuoka City, Japan.

The predecessor of the school was founded in 1946, and it was chartered as a university in 1980. The university is operated by the foundation that also operates Tokoha Gakuen Junior College. In April 2013, change the name to Tokoha University from Tokoha Gakuen University.
