= List of J2 League football transfers winter 2023–24 =

Transfer list

This is a list of J2 League transfers made during the winter transfer window of the 2024 season by each club.

== Blaublitz Akita ==
=== Arrivals ===
Date	Position	Player	From	Type	Source
4 August 2023	FW	(Japan) Ken Tshizanga Matsumoto	(Japan) Komazawa University	Full	
20 December 2023	FW	(Japan) Yukihito Kajiya	(Japan) Sagan Tosu	Full	
21 December 2023	FW	(Japan) Shion Niwa	(Japan) Zweigen Kanazawa	Full	
21 December 2023	FW	(Japan) Ren Komatsu	(Japan) Matsumoto Yamaga	Full	
22 December 2023	DF	(Japan) Kota Muramatsu	(Japan) V-Varen Nagasaki	Full	
22 December 2023	FW	(Japan) Koya Handa	(Japan) Verspah Oita	Loan return	
25 December 2023	DF	(Japan) Keita Yoshioka	(Japan) Montedio Yamagata	Loan	
26 December 2023	MF	(Japan) Hiroki Kurimoto	(Japan) Omiya Ardija	Full	
28 December 2023	GK	(Japan) Soki Yatagai	(Japan) AC Nagano Parceiro	Full	
29 December 2023	DF	(Japan) Ryohei Okazaki	(Japan) Tochigi SC	Full	
30 December 2023	DF	(Japan) Koji Hachisuka	(Japan) Vegalta Sendai	Full	
4 January 2024	MF	(Japan) Kazuya Onohara	(Japan) Zweigen Kanazawa	Loan	
8 January 2024	FW	(Japan) Daiki Sato	(Japan) FC Machida Zelvia	Loan	
14 January 2024	GK	(Japan) Kosuke Inose	(Japan) SC Sagamihara	Loan	
29 February 2024	MF	(Japan) Ryuhei Oishi	(Japan) Zweigen Kanazawa	Full	

=== Departures ===
Date	Position	Player	To	Type	Source
10 November 2023	MF	(Japan) Hiroto Tanaka		Retired	
13 November 2023	MF	(Japan) Yosuke Mikami		Released	
22 November 2023	MF	(Japan) Masaki Okino		Released	
15 December 2023	DF	(Japan) Ryutaro Iio	(Japan) V-Varen Nagasaki	Full	
17 December 2023	MF	(Japan) Daiki Kogure	(Japan) Iwate Grulla Morioka	Full	
19 December 2023	DF	(Japan) Kaito Abe	(Japan) Fagiano Okayama	Loan return	
19 December 2023	DF	(Japan) Ryota Takada	(Japan) Vegalta Sendai	Full	
19 December 2023	DF	(Japan) Yuji Fujita	(Japan) FC Osaka	Full	
20 December 2023	MF	(Japan) Keita Saito	(Japan) Fagiano Okayama	Full	
26 December 2023	MF	(Japan) Naoki Inoue	(Japan) Kataller Toyama	Full	
27 December 2023	GK	(Japan) Akihito Ozawa	(Japan) FC Imabari	Loan	
31 December 2023	FW	(Japan) Hayate Take	(Japan) FC Osaka	Full	
6 January 2024	GK	(Japan) Yuki Yasuda	(Australia) Fernhill	Full	
9 January 2024	DF	(Japan) Yuzuru Yoshimura	(Japan) Nara Club	Full	
15 February 2024	MF	(Japan) Yōsuke Mikami		Retired	
19 March 2024	MF	(Japan) Mouhamadou War	(United States) Los Angeles Force	Full	
14 May 2024	MF	(Japan) Hinase Suzuki	(Japan) Michinoku Sendai	Loan	

== Ehime FC ==
=== Arrivals ===
Date	Position	Player	From	Type	Source
30 August 2023	MF	(Japan) Masashi Tanioka	(Japan) Kansai University	Full	
21 September 2023	FW	(Japan) Kyota Funahashi	(Japan) Júbilo Iwata U-18s	Full	
17 November 2023	DF	(South Korea) Kang Sung-chang	(South Korea) Seohae High School	Full	
18 December 2023	MF	(Japan) Nelson Ishiwatari	(Japan) Cerezo Osaka	Loan	
22 December 2023	DF	(South Korea) Bak Keon-woo	(South Korea) Pohang Steelers	Full	
25 December 2023	DF	(South Korea) Yu Ye-chan	(South Korea) Jeonbuk Hyundai Motors	Full	
27 December 2023	FW	(Japan) Yuta Fujiwara	(Japan) Sagan Tosu	Full	
28 December 2023	MF	(Japan) Taiga Ishiura	(Japan) Tokyo Verdy	Full	
6 January 2024	MF	(Japan) Ryo Kubota	(Japan) FC Gifu	Full	
6 January 2024	MF	(Japan) Akira Hamashita	(Japan) Tokushima Vortis	Loan	
7 January 2024	DF	(Japan) Yusei Ozaki	(Japan) Vissel Kobe	Loan	
22 March 2024	DF	(Japan) Kazuya Kanazawa	(Japan) Doshisha University	DSP	

=== Departures ===
Date	Position	Player	To	Type	Source
29 November 2023	DF	(Japan) Shoi Yoshinaga	(Japan) Omiya Ardija	Loan return	
5 December 2023	DF	(Japan) Yasuhiro Hiraoka		Retired	
14 December 2023	MF	(Japan) Kyoji Kutsuna	(Japan) AC Nagano Parceiro	Full	
19 December 2023	MF	(Japan) Takumi Sasaki		Released	
20 December 2023	DF	(Japan) Kei Oshiro	(Japan) Gainare Tottori	Full	
20 December 2023	MF	(Japan) Asahi Yada	(Japan) Giravanz Kitakyushu	Full	
26 December 2023	FW	(Japan) Shumpei Fukahori	(Japan) Thespa Gunma	Loan return	
28 December 2023	MF	(Japan) Takuto Kimura	(Japan) Yokohama F. Marinos	Loan return	
29 December 2023	MF	(Japan) Yuto Hikida	(Japan) Fagiano Okayama	Loan return	
9 January 2024	FW	(Japan) Yugo Masukake	(Japan) Kashiwa Reysol	Loan return	
12 January 2024	DF	(Japan) Haruki Yoshida	(Japan) Edo All United	Full	
22 January 2024	MF	(Japan) Shuya Iwai	(Japan) Aventura Kawaguchi	Full	
12 March 2024	MF	(Japan) Takumi Sasaki	(Malaysia) Negeri Sembilan	Full	

== Fagiano Okayama ==
=== Arrivals ===
Date	Position	Player	From	Type	Source
21 March 2023	DF	(Japan) Yota Fujii	(Japan) Iizuka High School	Full	
23 May 2023	FW	(Japan) Ryunosuke Ota	(Japan) Meiji University	Full	
10 August 2023	GK	(Japan) Kohei Kawakami	(Japan) Toyo University	Full	
26 October 2023	MF	(Japan) Koju Yoshio	(Japan) Hosei University	Full	
14 December 2023	FW	(Brazil) Gabriel Xavier	(Brazil) Chapecoense	Full	
15 December 2023	MF	(Japan) Hiroto Iwabuchi	(Japan) Iwaki FC	Full	
15 December 2023	MF	(Japan) Rui Sueyoshi	(Japan) JEF United Chiba	Full	
16 December 2023	MF	(Japan) Sora Ogawa	(Japan) Hokkaido Consadole Sapporo	Full	
17 December 2023	MF	(Japan) Ryo Takeuchi	(Japan) Shimizu S-Pulse	Full	
18 December 2023	MF	(Japan) Ibuki Fujita	(Japan) Montedio Yamagata	Full	
19 December 2023	DF	(Japan) Kaito Abe	(Japan) Blaublitz Akita	Loan return	
20 December 2023	MF	(Japan) Keita Saito	(Japan) Blaublitz Akita	Full	
23 December 2023	DF	(Japan) Takahiro Yanagi	(Japan) FC Ryukyu	Full	
24 December 2023	MF	(Japan) Ryo Tabei	(Japan) Yokohama FC	Full	
27 December 2023	DF	(Japan) Daichi Tagami	(Japan) Albirex Niigata	Full	
1 January 2024	FW	(Brazil) Gleyson	(South Korea) Gyeongnam FC	Full	
2 January 2024	GK	(Germany) Svend Brodersen	(Japan) Yokohama FC	Full	
7 May 2024	MF	(Japan) Jumpei Hayakawa	(Japan) Urawa Red Diamonds	Loan	

=== Departures ===
Date	Position	Player	To	Type	Source
8 December 2023	GK	(Japan) Taiki Yamada	(Japan) Kashima Antlers	Loan return	
21 December 2023	DF	(Japan) Koji Sugiyama	(Japan) Giravanz Kitakyushu	Full	
21 December 2023	FW	(Japan) Ryo Nagai	(Japan) Giravanz Kitakyushu	Full	
22 December 2023	DF	(Japan) Mizuki Hamada	(Japan) Omiya Ardija	Full	
22 December 2023	DF	(Japan) Wakaba Shimoguchi	(Japan) Omiya Ardija	Full	
23 December 2023	MF	(Japan) Nagi Kawatani	(Japan) Shimizu S-Pulse	Loan return	
26 December 2023	FW	(Japan) Shunnosuke Matsuki	(Japan) Gainare Tottori	Full	
26 December 2023	MF	(Japan) Yosuke Kawai	(Japan) Kataller Toyama	Full	
27 December 2023	GK	(Japan) Rissei Taniguchi	(Japan) Giravanz Kitakyushu	Loan	
28 December 2023	FW	(Brazil) Tiago Alves	(Brazil) Chapecoense	Full	
29 December 2023	FW	(Japan) Isa Sakamoto	(Japan) Gamba Osaka	Loan return	
29 December 2023	MF	(Japan) Yuto Hikida		Released	
3 January 2024	FW	(Japan) Solomon Sakuragawa	(Japan) JEF United Chiba	Loan return	
5 January 2024	FW	(Japan) Tomoya Fukumoto	(Japan) Atletico Suzuka Club	Full	
9 January 2024	MF	(Japan) Tatsuhiko Noguchi	(Japan) Veertien Mie	Full	
10 January 2024	FW	(South Korea) Han Eui-kwon	(Malta) Balzan FC	Full	
10 January 2024	MF	(Japan) Kyoya Yamada	(Japan) Verspah Oita	Loan	
2 February 2024	MF	(Australia) Stefan Mauk	(Australia) Adelaide United	Full	
8 February 2024	MF	(Japan) Kiwara Miyazaki	(Japan) Shibuya City FC	Full	
28 February 2024	DF	(Netherlands) Jordy Buijs	(Netherlands) RKSV Halsteren	Full	

== Fujieda MYFC ==
=== Arrivals ===
Date	Position	Player	From	Type	Source
28 March 2023	MF	(Japan) Shoma Maeda	(Japan) Tokoha University	Full	
18 May 2023	MF	(Japan) Kaito Seriu	(Japan) Kagoshima Josei High School	Full	
30 May 2023	FW	(Japan) Kanta Nagata	(Japan) Chukyo University	Full	
24 July 2023	MF	(Japan) Ren Asakura	(Japan) Takushoku University	Full	
4 December 2023	MF	(Japan) Kento Nishiya	(Japan) FC Osaka	Full	
8 December 2023	MF	(Japan) So Nakagawa	(Japan) Júbilo Iwata	Full	
20 December 2023	GK	(Japan) Kei Uchiyama	(Japan) Sagan Tosu	Loan	
20 December 2023	MF	(Japan) Kota Osone	(Japan) Vegalta Sendai	Full	
25 December 2023	MF	(Japan) Kazuyoshi Shimabuku	(Japan) Albirex Niigata	Loan	
28 December 2023	DF	(Brazil) Wendel	(Brazil) Portuguesa	Full	
28 December 2023	DF	(Brazil) Carlinhos	(Brazil) Botafogo-SP	Full	
29 December 2023	MF	(Japan) Ryota Kajikawa	(Japan) Tokyo Verdy	Full	
29 December 2023	FW	(Japan) Taika Nakashima	(Japan) Hokkaido Consadole Sapporo	Loan	
10 May 2024	FW	(Japan) Hayato Kanda	(Japan) Osaka Gakuin University	DSP	

=== Departures ===
Date	Position	Player	To	Type	Source
18 November 2023	MF	(Japan) Yudai Tokunaga		Released	
1 December 2023	DF	(Japan) Hiromu Tanaka	(Japan) Hokkaido Consadole Sapporo	Loan return	
5 December 2023	FW	(Japan) Takato Nakai	(Japan) Verspah Oita	Full	
18 December 2023	MF	(Japan) Akiyuki Yokoyama	(Japan) JEF United Chiba	Full	
19 December 2023	GK	(Japan) Tomoki Ueda	(Japan) FC Gifu	Full	
25 December 2023	FW	(Japan) Ryota Iwabuchi	(Japan) FC Ryukyu	Full	
27 December 2023	MF	(Japan) Naoya Uozato	(Japan) Tegevajaro Miyazaki	Full	
27 December 2023	MF	(Brazil) Pedro	(Japan) Tochigi City	Loan	
29 December 2023	MF	(Japan) Masaki Kaneura	(Japan) Gainare Tottori	Full	
6 January 2024	DF	(Japan) Masayuki Yamada	(Japan) Fukushima United	Full	
8 January 2024	DF	(Japan) Kota Kudo	(Japan) Urawa Reds	Loan return	
25 January 2024	DF	(Brazil) Kauã	(Japan) Tonan Maebashi	Full	
19 February 2024	MF	(Japan) Yudai Tokunaga	(Japan) SC Sagamihara	Full	
4 March 2024	FW	(Brazil) Leonardo	(China) Suzhou Dongwu	Full	

== Iwaki FC ==
=== Arrivals ===
Date	Position	Player	From	Type	Source
24 December 2022	MF	(Japan) Yuma Kato	(Japan) Takushoku University	Full	
24 December 2022	DF	(Japan) Yuma Tsujioka	(Japan) International Pacific University	Full	
24 December 2022	FW	(Japan) Yoshihito Kondo	(Japan) Nagoya Gakuin University	Full	
10 July 2023	FW	(Japan) Keita Shirawachi	(Japan) Toin University of Yokohama	Full	
29 September 2023	MF	(Japan) Kanta Sakagishi	(Japan) Niigata University of Health and Welfare	Full	
23 October 2023	MF	(Japan) Yusuke Onishi	(Japan) Kokushikan University	Full	
14 December 2023	DF	(Japan) Jin Ikoma	(Japan) Renofa Yamaguchi	Full	
15 December 2023	GK	(Japan) Kotaro Tachikawa	(Japan) Shonan Bellmare	Full	
15 December 2023	MF	(Japan) Rui Osako	(Japan) Cerezo Osaka	Loan	
15 December 2023	GK	(South Korea) Joo Hyun-jin	(South Korea) Daedong Taxation High School	Full	
20 December 2023	DF	(Japan) Hayato Teruyama	(Japan) FC Imabari	Full	
21 December 2023	DF	(Japan) Rio Omori	(Japan) FC Tokyo	Loan	
22 December 2023	FW	(Japan) Ryo Tanada	(Japan) Sanfrecce Hiroshima	Loan	
22 December 2023	DF	(South Korea) Park Jun-yeong	(South Korea) Ansan Greeners	Full	
28 December 2023	FW	(Japan) Keita Buwanika	(Japan) JEF United Chiba	Full	
6 January 2024	MF	(Japan) Jun Nishikawa	(Japan) Cerezo Osaka	Loan	
15 March 2024	DF	(Japan) Sena Igarashi	(Japan) Toin University of Yokohama	DSP	

=== Departures ===
Date	Position	Player	To	Type	Source
27 November 2023	MF	(Japan) Kiwara Miyazaki	(Japan) Fagiano Okayama	Loan return	
9 December 2023	FW	(Japan) Daigo Furukawa	(Japan) FC Osaka	Full	
9 December 2023	DF	(Japan) Genki Egawa	(Japan) FC Osaka	Full	
9 December 2023	DF	(Japan) Tomoki Yoshida	(Japan) Kochi United SC	Full	
13 December 2023	MF	(Japan) Eiji Miyamoto	(Japan) Iwaki FC	Full	
13 December 2023	DF	(Japan) Ryo Endo	(Japan) Iwaki FC	Loan return	
14 December 2023	GK	(Japan) Toru Takagiwa	(Japan) Tokyo Verdy	Loan return	
14 December 2023	MF	(Japan) Asahi Haga	(Japan) FC Osaka	Loan	
14 December 2023	DF	(Japan) Yuma Tsujioka	(Japan) Tegevajaro Miyazaki	Loan	
15 December 2023	DF	(Japan) Rei Ieizumi	(Japan) Iwaki FC	Full	
15 December 2023	MF	(Japan) Hiroto Iwabuchi	(Japan) Fagiano Okayama	Full	
15 December 2023	FW	(Japan) Ryo Arita	(Japan) Montedio Yamagata	Full	
22 December 2023	MF	(Japan) Sota Nagai	(Japan) Tokyo Verdy	Full	
22 December 2023	DF	(Japan) Takumi Kawamura	(Japan) Tokyo Verdy	Full	
29 December 2023	FW	(Japan) Shu Yoshizawa	(Japan) Tegevajaro Miyazaki	Full	
6 January 2024	MF	(Brazil) Nélson Henrique	(Portugal) SC Praiense	Loan return	
13 January 2024	MF	(Japan) Wataru Kuromiya	(Japan) Fukuyama City FC	Full	

== JEF United Chiba ==
=== Arrivals ===
Date	Position	Player	From	Type	Source
17 February 2023	DF	(Japan) Ryota Kuboniwa	(Japan) Rikkyo University	Full	
12 December 2023	FW	(Japan) Kazuki Tanaka	(Japan) Kyoto Sanga	Full	
15 December 2023	GK	(Japan) Kazuki Fujita	(Japan) Albirex Niigata	Loan	
18 December 2023	MF	(Japan) Akiyuki Yokoyama	(Japan) Fujieda MYFC	Full	
30 December 2023	FW	(Japan) Taichi Sakuma	(Japan) Vanraure Hachinohe	Loan return	
30 December 2023	FW	(Japan) Masamichi Hayashi	(Japan) Zweigen Kanazawa	Full	
5 January 2024	GK	(Japan) Toru Takagiwa	(Japan) Tokyo Verdy	Full	
6 January 2024	MF	(Brazil) Dudu	(Japan) Júbilo Iwata	Full	
8 January 2024	GK	(Japan) Yuya Aoshima	(Japan) Tochigi SC	Loan	
26 March 2024	MF	(Japan) Manato Shinada	(Japan) FC Tokyo	Loan	
17 May 2024	MF	(Japan) Yuma Igari	(Japan) Sanno Institute of Management	DSP	

=== Departures ===
Date	Position	Player	To	Type	Source
6 November 2023	MF	(Japan) Tomoya Shinohara		Retired	
14 December 2023	MF	(Japan) Tomoya Miki	(Japan) Tokyo Verdy	Full	
15 December 2023	MF	(Japan) Rui Sueyoshi	(Japan) Fagiano Okayama	Full	
25 December 2023	MF	(Japan) Takaki Fukumitsu	(Japan) Verspah Oita	Full	
26 December 2023	FW	(Brazil) Matheus Saldanha	(Serbia) FK Partizan	Loan	
27 December 2023	MF	(Japan) Sota Matsubara	(Japan) AC Nagano Parceiro	Loan	
28 December 2023	FW	(Japan) Keita Buwanika	(Japan) Iwaki FC	Full	
29 December 2023	GK	(Japan) Issei Kondo	(Japan) Thespa Gunma	Full	
3 January 2024	FW	(Japan) Solomon Sakuragawa	(Japan) Yokohama FC	Full	
4 January 2024	DF	(Japan) Ikki Arai	(Japan) V-Varen Nagasaki	Full	
5 January 2024	GK	(Japan) Shota Arai	(Japan) Vissel Kobe	Full	
5 January 2024	MF	(Japan) Hisatoshi Nishido	(Japan) FC Tokyo	Loan return	
6 January 2024	DF	(Japan) Shunsuke Nishikubo	(Japan) Júbilo Iwata	Full	

== Kagoshima United ==
=== Arrivals ===
Date	Position	Player	From	Type	Source
8 September 2023	DF	(Japan) Kazuaki Ihori	(Japan) Tokai Gakuen University	Full	
27 December 2023	FW	(Japan) Charles Nduka	(Japan) FC Gifu	Full	
27 December 2023	MF	(Japan) Ryo Toyama	(Japan) Tokushima Vortis	Loan	
28 December 2023	MF	(Japan) Wataru Tanaka	(Japan) Montedio Yamagata	Loan	
28 December 2023	MF	(Japan) Keita Fujimura	(Japan) Zweigen Kanazawa	Full	
4 January 2024	DF	(Japan) Akira Ibayashi	(Japan) Shimizu S-Pulse	Full	
5 January 2024	MF	(Japan) Hisatoshi Nishido	(Japan) FC Tokyo	Loan	
10 January 2024	GK	(South Korea) Ono Cholhwan	(Japan) FC Gifu	Full	

=== Departures ===
Date	Position	Player	To	Type	Source
9 December 2023	DF	(Brazil) Weslley		Released	
19 December 2023	FW	(Japan) Shunsuke Yamamoto	(Japan) Renofa Yamaguchi	Full	
20 December 2023	MF	(Japan) Taku Ushinohama	(Japan) Giravanz Kitakyushu	Full	
22 December 2023	GK	(Japan) Issei Ouchi	(Japan) Yokohama FC	Loan return	
26 December 2023	DF	(Japan) Atsuki Satsukawa	(Japan) Oita Trinita	Full	
28 December 2023	DF	(Japan) Yuto Kide	(Japan) FC Osaka	Full	
9 January 2024	DF	(Japan) Takahiro Horie	(Japan) Atletico Suzuka Club	Loan	
31 January 2024	MF	(Japan) Frank Romero	(Japan) Reilac Shiga	Full	
2 February 2024	MF	(Japan) Kai Ishitsu	(Japan) R. Velho Takamatsu	Full	

== Mito HollyHock ==
=== Arrivals ===
Date	Position	Player	From	Type	Source
17 February 2023	FW	(Japan) Soki Tokuno	(Japan) Sendai University	Full	
16 June 2023	DF	(Japan) Hayata Ishii	(Japan) Josai International University	Full	
3 July 2023	MF	(Japan) Yuto Nagao	(Japan) Kwansei Gakuin University	Full	
7 July 2023	MF	(Japan) Kiichi Yamazaki	(Japan) Chuo University	Full	
14 July 2023	DF	(Japan) Takeshi Ushizawa	(Japan) Chuo University	Full	
26 July 2023	MF	(Japan) Asuma Ikari	(Japan) Ohzu High School	Full	
31 July 2023	FW	(Japan) Seiichiro Kubo	(Japan) Hosei University	Full	
12 October 2023	MF	(Japan) Shunsuke Saito	(Japan) Toko Gakuen High School	Full	
16 October 2023	DF	(Japan) Yuhi Ono	(Japan) Nihon University Fujisawa High School	Full	
16 December 2023	MF	(Japan) Ryusei Nose	(Japan) Giravanz Kitakyushu	Full	
21 December 2023	DF	(Japan) Ryoya Iizumi	(Japan) Gainare Tottori	Full	
25 December 2023	DF	(Japan) Tatsuya Tabira	(Japan) Iwate Grulla Morioka	Full	
27 December 2023	MF	(Japan) Haruki Arai	(Japan) FC Tiamo Hirakata	Full	
29 December 2023	MF	(Japan) Hidemasa Koda	(Japan) Nagoya Grampus	Loan	
30 December 2023	MF	(Japan) Riku Ochiai	(Japan) Kashiwa Reysol	Loan	
30 December 2023	GK	(Japan) Shuhei Matsubara	(Japan) Hokkaido Consadole Sapporo	Full	
9 February 2024	DF	(Japan) Sora Okita	(Japan) University of Tsukuba	DSP	
27 March 2024	MF	(Japan) Atsushi Kurokawa	(Japan) Machida Zelvia	Loan	
17 May 2024	FW	(Japan) Hayata Yamamoto	(Japan) Senshu University	DSP	

=== Departures ===
Date	Position	Player	To	Type	Source
21 December 2023	DF	(Japan) Keita Matsuda	(Japan) Kyoto Sanga	Loan return	
25 December 2023	MF	(Japan) Motoki Ohara	(Japan) Sanfrecce Hiroshima	Loan return	
27 December 2023	MF	(Japan) Takatora Einaga	(Japan) Kawasaki Frontale	Loan return	
28 December 2023	FW	(Japan) Keita Buwanika	(Japan) JEF United Chiba	Loan return	
28 December 2023	MF	(Japan) Fumiya Unoki	(Japan) Kashiwa Reysol	Loan return	
28 December 2023	MF	(Japan) Shoma Otoizumi	(Japan) Vanraure Hachinohe	Full	
29 December 2023	MF	(Japan) Hidetoshi Takeda	(Japan) Urawa Reds	Loan return	
29 December 2023	MF	(Japan) Reo Yasunaga	(Japan) Matsumoto Yamaga	Full	
30 December 2023	DF	(Japan) Takaya Kuroishi	(Japan) AC Nagano Parceiro	Loan	
1 January 2024	MF	(Japan) Ryo Niizato	(Japan) Iwate Grulla Morioka	Full	
6 January 2024	MF	(Japan) Yota Tanabe	(Japan) Kochi United SC	Loan	
6 January 2024	GK	(Japan) Louis Yamaguchi	(Japan) FC Machida Zelvia	Full	
7 January 2024	DF	(Japan) Jefferson Tabinas	(Thailand) Buriram United	Full	
7 January 2024	MF	(Japan) Shumpei Naruse	(Japan) Nagoya Grampus	Loan return	
8 February 2024	MF	(Japan) Kaiyo Yanagimachi	(Japan) Azul Claro Numazu	Full	
24 April 2024	MF	(Japan) Ren Inoue	(Japan) Tegevajaro Miyazaki	Loan	

== Montedio Yamagata ==
=== Arrivals ===
Date	Position	Player	From	Type	Source
13 January 2023	MF	(Japan) Kaisei Kano	(Japan) Kanto Gakuin University	Full	
21 March 2023	DF	(Japan) Jo Soma	(Japan) Sendai University	Full	
15 December 2023	FW	(Japan) Ryo Arita	(Japan) Iwaki FC	Full	
18 December 2023	FW	(Japan) Kanato Abe	(Japan) ReinMeer Aomori	Loan return	
22 December 2023	DF	(Japan) Keisuke Nishimura	(Japan) Omiya Ardija	Full	
27 December 2023	MF	(Japan) Nagi Matsumoto	(Japan) Cerezo Osaka	Loan	
28 December 2023	DF	(Japan) Kiriya Sakamoto	(Japan) Sagan Tosu	Loan return	
28 December 2023	MF	(Japan) Chihiro Kato	(Japan) Vegalta Sendai	Full	
28 December 2023	MF	(Japan) Ryoma Kida	(Japan) Vegalta Sendai	Full	
29 December 2023	MF	(Japan) Naohiro Sugiyama	(Japan) Gamba Osaka	Loan	
29 December 2023	DF	(Japan) Kazuma Okamoto	(Japan) Thespa Gunma	Full	
30 December 2023	MF	(Japan) Koki Sakamoto	(Japan) Yokohama FC	Full	
30 December 2023	DF	(Japan) Takashi Abe	(Japan) Tokushima Vortis	Full	
19 April 2024	DF	(Japan) Shuta Kikuchi	(Japan) Shimizu S-Pulse	Loan	
9 May 2024	FW	(Japan) Shunmei Horikane	(Japan) Kanto Gakuin University	DSP	

=== Departures ===
Date	Position	Player	To	Type	Source
6 November 2023	MF	(Japan) Kenya Okazaki		Retired	
14 December 2023	FW	(Brazil) Dellatorre	(Brazil) Mirassol	Full	
15 December 2023	MF	(Brazil) Tiago Alves	(Brazil) Botafogo-SP	Full	
18 December 2023	MF	(Japan) Ibuki Fujita	(Japan) Fagiano Okayama	Full	
22 December 2023	FW	(Japan) Ten Miyagi	(Japan) Kawasaki Frontale	Loan return	
25 December 2023	MF	(Japan) Takayuki Arakaki	(Japan) FC Gifu	Loan	
25 December 2023	DF	(Japan) Keita Yoshioka	(Japan) Blaublitz Akita	Loan	
27 December 2023	MF	(Japan) Masahito Ono	(Japan) Nagoya Grampus	Full	
27 December 2023	MF	(Japan) Toya Izumi	(Japan) Vissel Kobe	Loan return	
28 December 2023	MF	(Japan) Wataru Tanaka	(Japan) Kagoshima United	Loan	
30 December 2023	DF	(Japan) Hiroki Noda	(Japan) Kashiwa Reysol	Full	
14 January 2024	FW	(Japan) Towa Arakawa	(Brazil) CRAC	Loan	
15 January 2024	MF	(Japan) Shuto Kawai	(Japan) FC Tiamo Hirakata	Full	
1 February 2024	FW	(Japan) Kanta Matsumoto	(Japan) Veroskronos Tsuno	Full	
8 February 2024	GK	(Japan) Ryusuke Otomo	(Japan) Azul Claro Numazu	Full	

== Oita Trinita ==
=== Arrivals ===
Date	Position	Player	From	Type	Source
18 November 2022	MF	(Japan) Arata Kozakai	(Japan) Chukyo University	Full	
8 November 2023	FW	(South Korea) Kim Hyun-woo	(Japan) Tokoha University	Full	
21 December 2023	GK	(Japan) Taro Hamada	(Japan) AC Nagano Parceiro	Loan return	
25 December 2023	GK	(South Korea) Mun Kyung-gun	(South Korea) Jeju United FC	Full	
26 December 2023	DF	(Japan) Atsuki Satsukawa	(Japan) Kagoshima United	Full	
5 January 2024	DF	(Japan) Yudai Fujiwara	(Japan) Urawa Reds	Loan	
16 February 2024	FW	(Japan) Shuto Udo	(Japan) Chukyo University	DSP	
22 February 2024	MF	(Japan) Manato Kimoto	Japan University of Economics	DSP	

=== Departures ===
Date	Position	Player	To	Type	Source
19 December 2023	DF	(Japan) Katsunori Ueebisu	(Japan) Sagan Tosu	Full	
19 December 2023	FW	(Japan) Kazuki Fujimoto	(Japan) FC Machida Zelvia	Full	
21 December 2023	MF	(Japan) Keita Takahata	(Japan) Júbilo Iwata	Full	
24 December 2023	DF	(Japan) Kenta Fukumori	(Japan) Tochigi SC	Full	
24 December 2023	GK	(Brazil) Matheus Teixeira	(Brazil) Bahia	Loan return	
9 January 2024	DF	(Japan) Ryosuke Tone		Retired	
10 January 2024	DF	(Japan) Keisuke Saka	(Japan) Gamba Osaka	Full	

== Renofa Yamaguchi ==
=== Arrivals ===
Date	Position	Player	From	Type	Source
25 May 2023	MF	(Japan) Hiro Mizuguchi	(Japan) International Pacific University	Full	
5 September 2023	MF	(Japan) Kohei Tanabe	(Japan) Chuo University	Full	
11 December 2023	DF	(Japan) Kaili Shimbo	(Japan) Iwate Grulla Morioka	Full	
12 December 2023	MF	(Japan) Yuki Aida	(Japan) Vanraure Hachinohe	Full	
15 December 2023	DF	(Japan) Takeru Itakura	(Japan) FC Osaka	Full	
19 December 2023	FW	(Japan) Shunsuke Yamamoto	(Japan) Kagoshima United	Full	
20 December 2023	FW	(Japan) Yamato Wakatsuki	(Japan) Shonan Bellmare	Full	
26 December 2023	MF	(Japan) Junya Kato	(Japan) Zweigen Kanazawa	Full	
26 December 2023	GK	(Japan) Junto Taguchi	(Japan) FC Ryukyu	Full	
25 January 2024	DF	(Japan) Naiki Imai	(Japan) Kochi United SC	Full	
28 January 2024	GK	(Japan) Koshiro Itohara	(Japan) Gainare Tottori	Full	
26 April 2024	DF	(Japan) Yuya Mineda	(Japan) Osaka University HSS	DSP	

=== Departures ===
Date	Position	Player	To	Type	Source
14 December 2023	DF	(Japan) Jin Ikoma	(Japan) Iwaki FC	Full	
20 December 2023	GK	(Japan) Riku Terakado	(Japan) Yokohama F. Marinos	Loan return	
26 December 2023	GK	(Japan) Reo Kunimoto		Released	
26 December 2023	GK	(Japan) Daisuke Yoshimitsu	(Japan) Albirex Niigata	Full	
27 December 2023	DF	(Japan) Kento Hashimoto	(Japan) Tokushima Vortis	Full	
30 December 2023	MF	(Japan) Hikaru Naruoka	(Japan) Shimizu S-Pulse	Loan return	
30 December 2023	MF	(Japan) Riku Kamigaki	(Japan) Nara Club	Full	
3 January 2024	MF	(Japan) Shinya Yajima	(Japan) Shimizu S-Pulse	Full	
5 January 2024	FW	(Japan) Yusuke Minagawa		Released	
5 January 2024	MF	(Japan) Yuan Matsuhashi	(Japan) Tokyo Verdy	Loan return	
6 January 2024	DF	(Japan) Ginta Uemoto		Released	
20 January 2024	FW	(Japan) Shuhei Otsuki		Retired	
14 February 2024	FW	(Japan) Daisuke Takagi	(Japan) FC Ryukyu	Full	
30 April 2024	MF	(Japan) Hiro Mizuguchi	(Japan) Atletico Suzuka Club	Loan	

== Roasso Kumamoto ==
=== Arrivals ===
Date	Position	Player	From	Type	Source
19 May 2023	MF	(Japan) Koya Fujii	(Japan) Chukyo University	Full	
13 October 2023	MF	(Japan) Chihiro Konagaya	(Japan) Tokoha University	Full	
31 October 2023	FW	(South Korea) Bae Jeong-min	(Japan) Kyushu Sangyo University	Full	
8 December 2023	DF	(Japan) Takumi Sakai	(Japan) FC Osaka	Full	
12 December 2023	GK	(Japan) Shibuki Sato	(Japan) Tokai University	Full	
5 January 2024	DF	(Japan) Wataru Iwashita	(Japan) Kashiwa Reysol	Loan	

=== Departures ===
Date	Position	Player	To	Type	Source
13 November 2023	GK	(Japan) Takuya Masuda		Retired	
11 December 2023	MF	(Japan) Keisuke Tanabe		Retired	
21 December 2023	DF	(Japan) Yuya Aizawa	(Japan) Criacao Shinjuku	Loan	
22 December 2023	FW	(Japan) Yusei Toshida	(Japan) Zweigen Kanazawa	Full	
26 December 2023	FW	(Japan) Shohei Aihara	(Japan) FC Gifu	Loan	
30 December 2023	MF	(Japan) Rei Hirakawa	(Japan) Júbilo Iwata	Full	
5 January 2024	DF	(Japan) Takuya Shimamura	(Japan) Kashiwa Reysol	Full	
6 January 2024	MF	(Japan) Yuto Taniyama	(Japan) FC Tokushima	Loan	

== Shimizu S-Pulse ==
=== Arrivals ===
Date	Position	Player	From	Type	Source
4 April 2023	DF	(Japan) Sen Takagi	(Japan) Hannan University	Full	
13 April 2023	GK	(Japan) Yui Inokoshi	(Japan) Chuo University	Full	
12 October 2023	FW	(Japan) Riku Gunji	(Japan) Ichiritsu Funabashi High School	Full	
23 December 2023	MF	(Japan) Nagi Kawatani	(Japan) Fagiano Okayama	Loan return	
26 December 2023	DF	(Japan) Jelani Reshaun Sumiyoshi	(Japan) Sanfrecce Hiroshima	Loan	
27 December 2023	MF	(Japan) Ryotaro Nakamura	(Japan) Kashima Antlers	Loan	
26 December 2023	GK	(Japan) Yuya Oki	(Japan) Kashima Antlers	Full	
28 December 2023	DF	(Japan) Sodai Hasukawa	(Japan) FC Tokyo	Loan	
30 December 2023	FW	(Japan) Kanta Chiba	(Japan) FC Imabari	Loan return	
30 December 2023	MF	(Japan) Hikaru Naruoka	(Japan) Renofa Yamaguchi	Loan return	
30 December 2023	FW	(Japan) Riyo Kawamoto	(Japan) Thespa Gunma	Loan return	
3 January 2024	MF	(Japan) Shinya Yajima	(Japan) Renofa Yamaguchi	Full	
4 January 2024	MF	(Japan) Kai Matsuzaki	(Japan) Urawa Reds	Full	
12 January 2024	FW	(Japan) Aoi Ando	(Japan) Azul Claro Numazu	Loan return	
30 January 2024	FW	(Brazil) Lucas Braga	(Brazil) Santos	Loan	
12 February 2024	FW	(Brazil) Douglas Tanque	(Turkey) Kocaelispor	Full	

=== Departures ===
Date	Position	Player	To	Type	Source
17 December 2023	MF	(Japan) Ryo Takeuchi	(Japan) Fagiano Okayama	Full	
20 December 2023	MF	(Japan) Yuta Taki	(Japan) Matsumoto Yamaga	Full	
24 December 2023	MF	(Japan) Yuta Kamiya	(South Korea) Gangwon FC	Full	
26 December 2023	MF	(Japan) Katsuhiro Nakayama	(Japan) Nagoya Grampus	Full	
26 December 2023	MF	(Japan) Yasufumi Nishimura	(Japan) AC Nagano Parceiro	Full	
27 December 2023	DF	(Japan) Yoshinori Suzuki	(Japan) Kyoto Sanga	Full	
29 December 2023	DF	(Japan) Taketo Ochiai	(Japan) Okinawa SV	Loan	
29 December 2023	MF	(Kosovo) Benjamin Kololli	(Switzerland) FC Basel	Full	
30 December 2023	MF	(Japan) Daiki Matsuoka	(Japan) Avispa Fukuoka	Full	
30 December 2023	FW	(Japan) Sena Saito	(Japan) Thespa Gunma	Loan	
3 January 2024	GK	(Japan) Takuo Okubo	(Japan) Iwate Grulla Morioka	Full	
3 January 2024	MF	(Brazil) Ronaldo		Released	
4 January 2024	DF	(Japan) Akira Ibayashi	(Japan) Kagoshima United	Full	
5 January 2024	FW	(South Korea) Oh Se-hun	(Japan) FC Machida Zelvia	Loan	
7 January 2024	MF	(Brazil) Yago Pikachu	(Brazil) Fortaleza	Full	
13 January 2024	FW	(Brazil) Thiago Santana	(Japan) Urawa Reds	Full	
6 February 2024	MF	(Brazil) Renato Augusto	(Japan) Ventforet Kofu	Full	
19 April 2024	DF	(Japan) Shuta Kikuchi	(Japan) Montedio Yamagata	Loan	
20 May 2024	FW	(Japan) Riyo Kawamoto	(Japan) Thespa Gunma	Loan	

== Thespa Gunma ==
=== Arrivals ===
Date	Position	Player	From	Type	Source
12 May 2023	DF	(Japan) Ryota Tagashira	(Japan) Toyo University	Full	
28 July 2023	MF	(Japan) Taishi Tamashiro	(Japan) Sendai University	Full	
23 October 2023	DF	(Japan) Rikiru Nakano	(Japan) Kiryu Daiichi High School	Full	
8 December 2023	FW	(Japan) Yuya Takazawa	(Japan) FC Machida Zelvia	Full	
27 December 2023	DF	(Japan) Ryuya Ohata	(Japan) Kataller Toyama	Full	
27 December 2023	MF	(Japan) Takatora Einaga	(Japan) Kawasaki Frontale	Loan	
29 December 2023	DF	(Japan) Yuma Funabashi	(Japan) AC Nagano Parceiro	Full	
29 December 2023	GK	(Japan) Issei Kondo	(Japan) JEF United Chiba	Full	
30 December 2023	FW	(Japan) Sena Saito	(Japan) Shimizu S-Pulse	Loan	
30 December 2023	MF	(Japan) Ren Fujimura	(Japan) Iwate Grulla Morioka	Full	
31 December 2023	MF	(Japan) Masashi Wada	(Japan) Iwate Grulla Morioka	Full	
5 January 2024	MF	(Japan) Ryuji Sugimoto	(Japan) Tokyo Verdy	Full	
6 January 2024	GK	(Japan) Kohei Maki	(Japan) Cerezo Osaka	Full	
6 January 2024	FW	(Japan) Kosuke Sagawa	(Japan) Tokyo Verdy	Loan	
20 May 2024	FW	(Japan) Riyo Kawamoto	(Japan) Shimizu S-Pulse	Loan	

=== Departures ===
Date	Position	Player	To	Type	Source
22 December 2023	MF	(Japan) Tatsuya Uchida	(Japan) FC Tiamo Hirakata	Full	
26 December 2023	FW	(Japan) Shumpei Fukahori	(Japan) Iwate Grulla Morioka	Full	
26 December 2023	DF	(Japan) Yuki Kawakami	(Japan) Kataller Toyama	Full	
26 December 2023	DF	(Japan) Hiroto Hatao	(Japan) Zweigen Kanazawa	Full	
29 December 2023	DF	(Japan) Kazuma Okamoto	(Japan) Montedio Yamagata	Full	
29 December 2023	GK	(Japan) Koji Yamada	(Japan) FC Osaka	Full	
30 December 2023	FW	(Japan) Riyo Kawamoto	(Japan) Shimizu S-Pulse	Loan return	
30 December 2023	FW	(Japan) Akito Takagi	(Japan) SC Sagamihara	Full	
31 December 2023	FW	(Japan) Hayate Take	(Japan) Blaublitz Akita	Loan return	
4 January 2024	FW	(Japan) Koji Okumura	(Japan) YSCC Yokohama	Full	
5 January 2024	MF	(Japan) Yudai Nakata	(Japan) FC Tiamo Hirakata	Loan	
6 January 2024	GK	(Japan) Keiki Shimizu		Retired	
7 January 2024	MF	(Japan) Yu Tabei	(Japan) Reilac Shiga	Full	
7 January 2024	MF	(Japan) Yuzo Iwakami	(Japan) SC Sagamihara	Full	
9 January 2024	MF	(Japan) Kazune Kubota	(Japan) Reilac Shiga	Full	
10 January 2024	MF	(Japan) Tomoyuki Shiraishi	(Japan) Reilac Shiga	Full	

== Tochigi SC ==
=== Arrivals ===
Date	Position	Player	From	Type	Source
11 September 2023	MF	(Japan) Taichi Aoshima	(Japan) Rissho University	Full	
12 September 2023	MF	(South Korea) Park Yong-ji	(South Korea) Chosun University	Full	
8 December 2023	MF	(Japan) Shintaro Ide	(Japan) Toin University of Yokohama	Full	
15 December 2023	DF	(Japan) Takumi Fujitani	(Japan) FC Gifu	Full	
23 December 2023	MF	(Japan) Kodai Dohi	(Japan) Sanfrecce Hiroshima	Loan	
24 December 2023	DF	(Japan) Kenta Fukumori	(Japan) Oita Trinita	Full	
26 December 2023	GK	(South Korea) Kim Min-jun	(South Korea) Incheon United	Full	
27 December 2023	FW	(Japan) Rennosuke Kawana	(Japan) Sanno Institute of Management	Full	
28 December 2023	FW	(Japan) Koya Okuda	(Japan) V-Varen Nagasaki	Full	
28 December 2023	GK	(Japan) Kenta Tanno	(Japan) Iwate Grulla Morioka	Full	
29 December 2023	GK	(Japan) Keitaro Nakajima	(Japan) Júbilo Iwata	Loan	
29 December 2023	FW	(Japan) Harumi Minamino	(Japan) Gamba Osaka	Loan	
4 January 2024	FW	(Nigeria) Origbaajo Ismaila	(Japan) Kyoto Sanga	Full	
15 February 2024	MF	(Japan) Haruto Yoshino	(Japan) Rissho University	DSP	

=== Departures ===
Date	Position	Player	To	Type	Source
9 November 2023	MF	(Japan) Ren Yamamoto		Released	
11 December 2023	FW	(Brazil) Leandro Pereira	(Brazil) Botafogo-SP	Full	
15 December 2023	GK	(Japan) Kazuki Fujita	(Japan) Albirex Niigata	Loan return	
25 December 2023	MF	(Japan) Yojiro Takahagi	(Singapore) Albirex Niigata (S)	Full	
26 December 2023	MF	(Japan) Keita Ueda	(Japan) Yokohama F. Marinos	Loan return	
27 December 2023	FW	(Japan) Ryo Nemoto	(Japan) Shonan Bellmare	Loan return	
28 December 2023	MF	(Japan) Yuki Nishiya	(Japan) Zweigen Kanazawa	Full	
29 December 2023	DF	(Japan) Ryohei Okazaki	(Japan) Blaublitz Akita	Full	
29 December 2023	DF	(Japan) Tomoyasu Yoshida	(Japan) Tegevajaro Miyazaki	Full	
8 January 2024	GK	(Japan) Yuya Aoshima	(Japan) JEF United Chiba	Loan	
9 January 2024	MF	(Japan) Yukuto Omoya	(Japan) Reilac Shiga	Full	
10 January 2024	MF	(Japan) Kojiro Yasuda	(Japan) FC Tokyo	Loan return	
11 January 2024	DF	(Japan) Kenya Onodera	(Japan) Reilac Shiga	Full	
14 January 2024	FW	(Japan) Masato Igarashi	(Japan) Reilac Shiga	Full	
14 March 2023	MF	(Brazil) Juninho	(Japan) Bandito Ikoma	Full	

== Tokushima Vortis ==
=== Arrivals ===
Date	Position	Player	From	Type	Source
10 April 2023	DF	(Japan) Hayato Aoki	(Japan) Nihon University	Full	
18 October 2023	MF	(Japan) Yu Takada	(Japan) Shizuoka Gakuen High School	Full	
24 December 2023	MF	(Japan) Ryota Nagaki	(Japan) Shonan Bellmare	Full	
26 December 2023	DF	(Japan) Ko Yanagisawa	(Japan) Gamba Osaka	Full	
26 December 2023	FW	(Japan) Noah Kenshin Browne	(Japan) Azul Claro Numazu	Full	
27 December 2023	DF	(Japan) Kento Hashimoto	(Japan) Renofa Yamaguchi	Full	
5 January 2024	DF	(Brazil) Kaique	(Japan) V-Varen Nagasaki	Loan	
5 January 2024	MF	(Japan) Toshio Shimakawa	(Japan) Sagan Tosu	Full	
21 March 2024	GK	(Japan) Daiki Mitsui	(Japan) Nagoya Grampus	Loan	
26 March 2024	FW	(Japan) Tiago Alves	(Brazil) Chapecoense	Full	

=== Departures ===
Date	Position	Player	To	Type	Source
1 November 2023	DF	(Japan) Hidenori Ishii		Retired	
19 December 2023	GK	(Japan) Koki Matsuzawa	(Japan) Vegalta Sendai	Full	
27 December 2023	MF	(Japan) Ryo Toyama	(Japan) Kagoshima United	Loan	
30 December 2023	DF	(Japan) Takashi Abe	(Japan) Montedio Yamagata	Full	
4 January 2024	FW	(Japan) Kaito Mori	(Japan) Kashiwa Reysol	Loan return	
4 January 2024	MF	(Japan) Tatsunori Sakurai	(Japan) Vissel Kobe	Loan return	
6 January 2024	DF	(Japan) Towa Nishisaka	(Japan) ReinMeer Aomori	Loan	
6 January 2024	MF	(Japan) Akira Hamashita	(Japan) Ehime FC	Loan	
6 January 2024	MF	(Japan) Eiji Shirai	(Japan) Kashiwa Reysol	Full	
6 January 2024	MF	(Japan) Yushi Hasegawa	(Japan) SC Sagamihara	Loan	
6 January 2024	MF	(Japan) Shiryu Fujiwara	(Japan) Tegevajaro Miyazaki	Loan	
10 January 2024	MF	(Japan) Yudai Yamashita	(Japan) Reilac Shiga	Loan	
14 January 2024	DF	(Japan) Noriki Fuke		Retired	
14 February 2024	DF	(Spain) Luismi Quezada	(Dominican Republic) Cibao	Full	
8 March 2024	DF	(Brazil) Cacá	(Brazil) Corinthians	Loan	
1 April 2024	MF	(Japan) Toshio Shimakawa		Retired	
4 April 2024	MF	(Japan) Kazuki Nishiya		Contract terminated	

== V-Varen Nagasaki ==
=== Arrivals ===
Date	Position	Player	From	Type	Source
26 May 2023	DF	(Japan) Malcolm Tsuyoshi Moyo	(Japan) Hosei University	Full	
15 December 2023	DF	(Japan) Ryutaro Iio	(Japan) Blaublitz Akita	Full	
25 December 2023	GK	(Japan) Tomoya Wakahara	(Japan) Kyoto Sanga	Loan	
26 December 2023	MF	(Japan) Riku Yamada	(Japan) Nagoya Grampus	Full	
26 December 2023	MF	(Japan) Seiya Satsukida	(Japan) Reilac Shiga	Loan return	
4 January 2024	DF	(Japan) Ikki Arai	(Japan) JEF United Chiba	Full	
11 January 2024	DF	(Japan) Hayato Tanaka	(Japan) Kashiwa Reysol	Loan	
2 April 2024	DF	(Japan) Shumpei Naruse	(Japan) Nagoya Grampus	Loan	
24 May 2024	MF	(Japan) Shunsuke Aoki	(Japan) Hosei University	DSP	

=== Departures ===
Date	Position	Player	To	Type	Source
13 December 2023	MF	(Japan) Yohei Otake	(Singapore) Albirex Niigata (S)	Full	
22 December 2023	DF	(Japan) Kota Muramatsu	(Japan) Blaublitz Akita	Full	
22 December 2023	GK	(Japan) Go Hatano	(Japan) FC Tokyo	Loan return	
23 December 2023	DF	(Japan) Ryo Okui	(Japan) Tochigi City	Full	
27 December 2023	FW	(Japan) Ken Tokura	(Japan) Iwate Grulla Morioka	Full	
28 December 2023	FW	(Brazil) Cristiano		Released	
28 December 2023	FW	(Japan) Koya Okuda	(Japan) Tochigi SC	Full	
5 January 2024	DF	(Brazil) Kaique	(Japan) Tokushima Vortis	Loan	
5 January 2024	DF	(Japan) Shunki Takahashi	(Japan) Iwate Grulla Morioka	Full	
8 January 2024	MF	(Japan) Yuya Kuwasaki	(Japan) Vissel Kobe	Full	
12 January 2024	DF	(Japan) Yuta Imazu	(Japan) Ventforet Kofu	Full	
17 January 2024	MF	(Japan) Raiju Obuchi	(Japan) Tegevajaro Miyazaki	Loan	
27 January 2024	DF	(Spain) Carlos Gutiérrez	(Spain) SD Huesca	Full	
18 February 2024	MF	(Brazil) Caio César	(Brazil) CRB	Full	
27 March 2024	FW	(Japan) Serigne Saliou Diop	(Japan) Matsumoto Yamaga	Loan	

== Vegalta Sendai ==
=== Arrivals ===
Date	Position	Player	From	Type	Source
22 February 2023	DF	(Japan) Rikuto Ishio	(Japan) Sendai University	Full	
31 August 2023	MF	(Japan) Manato Kudo	(Japan) Biwako Seikei Sport College	Full	
4 September 2023	FW	(Japan) Minto Nishimaru	(Japan) Kamimura Gakuen High School	Full	
16 November 2023	MF	(Japan) Keito Arita	(Japan) Chuo University	Full	
19 December 2023	GK	(Japan) Koki Matsuzawa	(Japan) Tokushima Vortis	Full	
19 December 2023	DF	(Japan) Ryota Takada	(Japan) Blaublitz Akita	Full	
20 December 2023	MF	(Japan) Ryunosuke Sagara	(Japan) Sagan Tosu	Full	
26 December 2023	DF	(Japan) Tetsuya Chinen	(Japan) Urawa Reds	Full	
28 December 2023	MF	(Japan) Toya Myogan	(Japan) Kawasaki Frontale	Loan	
4 January 2024	DF	(Brazil) Matheus Moraes	(Brazil) Vitória	Full	
8 January 2024	FW	(Brazil) Eron	(Brazil) Vila Nova	Full	
12 March 2024	MF	(Japan) Renji Matsui	(Japan) Kawasaki Frontale	Loan	

=== Departures ===
Date	Position	Player	To	Type	Source
23 November 2023	MF	(Brazil) Ewerton	(Portugal) Portimonense	Loan return	
24 November 2023	FW	(South Korea) Heo Yong-joon	(South Korea) Pohang Steelers	Loan return	
24 November 2023	DF	(South Korea) Kim Tae-hyeon	(South Korea) Ulsan Hyundai	Loan return	
14 December 2023	MF	(Brazil) Foguinho	(Brazil) Chapecoense	Full	
18 December 2023	MF	(North Korea) Ryang Yong-gi		Retired	
20 December 2023	MF	(Japan) Kota Osone	(Japan) Fujieda MYFC	Full	
22 December 2023	DF	(Japan) Naoya Fukumori	(Japan) FC Imabari	Full	
28 December 2023	MF	(Japan) Chihiro Kato	(Japan) Montedio Yamagata	Full	
28 December 2023	MF	(Japan) Ryoma Kida	(Japan) Montedio Yamagata	Full	
29 December 2023	FW	(Japan) Hiroto Yamada	(Japan) Cerezo Osaka	Loan return	
30 December 2023	MF	(Japan) Yosuke Akiyama	(Japan) Fukushima United	Full	
30 December 2023	DF	(Japan) Koji Hachisuka	(Japan) Blaublitz Akita	Full	
4 January 2024	DF	(Japan) Kai Matsuzaki	(Japan) Urawa Reds	Loan return	
24 January 2024	DF	(Japan) Masashi Wakasa		Retired	
22 February 2024	FW	(Japan) Manabu Saito	(Japan) Azul Claro Numazu	Full	

== Ventforet Kofu ==
=== Arrivals ===
Date	Position	Player	From	Type	Source
18 April 2023	MF	(Japan) Miki Inoue	(Japan) Meiji University	Full	
27 June 2023	FW	(Japan) Yukito Murakami	(Japan) Senshu University	Full	
19 December 2023	DF	(Japan) Taiga Son	(Japan) Sagan Tosu	Full	
19 December 2023	FW	(Japan) Kaito Kamiya	(Japan) Kawasaki Frontale	Full	
27 December 2023	MF	(Japan) Naoto Misawa	(Japan) Kyoto Sanga	Full	
28 December 2023	FW	(Colombia) Fabián González	(Japan) Júbilo Iwata	Full	
28 December 2023	MF	(Japan) Takuto Kimura	(Japan) Yokohama F. Marinos	Loan	
10 January 2023	MF	(Brazil) Adaílton	(Japan) FC Tokyo	Full	
12 January 2024	DF	(Japan) Yuta Imazu	(Japan) V-Varen Nagasaki	Full	
16 January 2024	DF	(Japan) Takahiro Iida	(Japan) Kyoto Sanga	Loan	
2 February 2024	DF	(Japan) Taiju Ichinose	(Japan) Yamanashi Gakuin University	DSP	
6 February 2024	MF	(Brazil) Renato Augusto	(Japan) Shimizu S-Pulse	Full	
5 April 2024	MF	(Japan) Kotatsu Kumakura	(Japan) Nihon University	DSP	
25 April 2024	GK	(South Korea) Koh Bong-jo	(Japan) Sagan Tosu	Loan	

=== Departures ===
Date	Position	Player	To	Type	Source
22 December 2023	DF	(Japan) Sota Miura	(Japan) Kawasaki Frontale	Full	
23 December 2023	MF	(Japan) Motoki Hasegawa	(Japan) Albirex Niigata	Full	
27 December 2023	MF	(Japan) Nagi Matsumoto	(Japan) Cerezo Osaka	Loan return	
27 December 2023	MF	(Japan) Ryotaro Nakamura	(Japan) Kashima Antlers	Loan return	
28 December 2023	FW	(Brazil) Cristiano	(Japan) V-Varen Nagasaki	Loan return	
28 December 2023	FW	(Brazil) Getúlio	(Brazil) Tombense	Loan return	
28 December 2023	DF	(Japan) Sodai Hasukawa	(Japan) FC Tokyo	Loan return	
5 January 2024	FW	(Japan) Kohei Matsumoto	(Japan) Kataller Toyama	Loan	
6 January 2024	DF	(Japan) Shion Inoue	(Japan) Nagoya Grampus	Full	
10 January 2024	GK	(New Zealand) Michael Woud	(Japan) Kyoto Sanga	Loan return	
10 January 2024	MF	(Japan) Manato Shinada	(Japan) FC Tokyo	Loan return	
11 January 2024	DF	(Japan) Riku Matsuda	(Japan) Cerezo Osaka	Loan return	
17 January 2024	DF	(Japan) Yuzuki Yamato	(Japan) Iwate Grulla Morioka	Loan	
28 February 2024	FW	(Brazil) Lucas Macedo	(South Korea) Paju Citizen	Full	
14 March 2024	DF	(Japan) Riku Nozawa	(Japan) FC Gifu	Loan	
28 March 2024	MF	(Japan) Hikaru Endo	(Japan) Tegevajaro Miyazaki	Loan	

== Yokohama FC ==
=== Arrivals ===
Date	Position	Player	From	Type	Source
24 June 2022	MF	(Japan) Hinata Ogura	(Japan) Waseda University	Full	
8 September 2023	MF	(Japan) Jo Hashimoto	(Japan) Kanto Gakuin University	Full	
2 October 2023	DF	(Japan) Ibuki Matsushita	(Japan) Miyazaki Nihon University High School	Full	
20 December 2023	DF	(Japan) Hayato Sugita	(Japan) FC Gifu	Loan return	
26 December 2023	GK	(Japan) Akinori Ichikawa	(Japan) Gamba Osaka	Loan return	
29 December 2023	DF	(Japan) Akito Fukumori	(Japan) Hokkaido Consadole Sapporo	Loan	
3 January 2024	MF	(Japan) Yoshihiro Nakano	(Japan) Shonan Bellmare	Loan	
3 January 2024	FW	(Japan) Solomon Sakuragawa	(Japan) JEF United Chiba	Full	
4 January 2024	FW	(Japan) Keisuke Muroi	(Japan) Omiya Ardija	Full	
4 January 2024	FW	(Japan) Kaito Mori	(Japan) Kashiwa Reysol	Full	
5 January 2024	FW	(Japan) Toma Murata	(Japan) FC Gifu	Full	
5 January 2024	FW	(Japan) Izumi Miyata	(Japan) Ryutsu Keizai University	Full	
6 January 2024	GK	(Brazil) Phelipe Megiolaro	(Japan) Vissel Kobe	Full	
6 January 2024	DF	(Brazil) Léo Bahia	(Japan) Zweigen Kanazawa	Full	
7 January 2024	MF	(Japan) Mizuki Arai	(Japan) Vissel Kobe	Loan return	
16 February 2024	DF	(Japan) Soma Sato	(Japan) Tokai Gakuen University	DSP	
25 March 2024	FW	(Japan) Toshiki Takahashi	(Japan) Urawa Reds	Loan	

=== Departures ===
Date	Position	Player	To	Type	Source
22 December 2023	GK	(Japan) Issei Ouchi	(Japan) Matsumoto Yamaga	Full	
24 December 2023	MF	(Japan) Ryo Tabei	(Japan) Fagiano Okayama	Full	
24 December 2023	DF	(Japan) Taiga Nishiyama	(Japan) Tochigi City	Full	
26 December 2023	FW	(Japan) Kaisei Ishii	(Japan) FC Ryukyu	Full	
26 December 2023	FW	(Japan) Ryoya Yamashita	(Japan) Gamba Osaka	Full	
27 December 2023	DF	(Japan) Kento Hashimoto	(Japan) Renofa Yamaguchi	Loan return	
30 December 2023	MF	(Japan) Koki Sakamoto	(Japan) Montedio Yamagata	Full	
30 December 2023	MF	(Japan) Tomoki Kondo	(Japan) Hokkaido Consadole Sapporo	Full	
2 January 2024	GK	(Germany) Svend Brodersen	(Japan) Fagiano Okayama	Full	
4 January 2024	DF	(Brazil) Matheus Moraes	(Brazil) Vitória	Loan return	
5 January 2024	DF	(Japan) Kyohei Yoshino	(South Korea) Daegu FC	Full	
5 January 2024	DF	(Japan) Shawn van Eerden	(Japan) YSCC Yokohama	Loan	
5 January 2024	MF	(Japan) Yuto Shimizu	(Japan) Vanraure Hachinohe	Loan	
5 January 2024	MF	(Japan) Kazuma Takai	(Japan) Matsumoto Yamaga	Full	
6 January 2024	MF	(Japan) Hayase Takashio	(Japan) Zweigen Kanazawa	Loan	
6 January 2024	MF	(Japan) Koshiro Uda	(Japan) Kochi United SC	Loan	
6 January 2024	GK	(Japan) Yuji Rokutan	(Japan) FC Ryukyu	Loan	
6 January 2024	DF	(Japan) Kotaro Hayashi	(Japan) FC Machida Zelvia	Full	
7 January 2024	FW	(Brazil) Marcelo Ryan	(Japan) Sagan Tosu	Full	
12 January 2024	MF	(Japan) Tatsuya Hasegawa	(Japan) Hokkaido Consadole Sapporo	Full	
21 March 2024	FW	(Japan) Koki Ogawa	(Netherlands) NEC Nijmegen	Full	
12 April 2024	DF	(Japan) Kengo Hayashi	(Japan) Tegevajaro Miyazaki	Loan	
10 May 2024	FW	(Japan) Izumi Miyata	(Japan) Gainare Tottori	Loan	

== See also ==
- List of J1 League football transfers winter 2023–24
- List of J2 League football transfers winter 2022–23
