= List of J1 League football transfers winter 2023–24 =

Transfer list

This is a list of J1 League transfers made during the winter transfer window of the 2024 season by each club.

== Albirex Niigata ==
=== Arrivals ===
| Date | Positiontk | Player | From | Type | Source |
|---|---|---|---|---|---|
| 10 August 2023 | DF | (Japan) Riita Mori | (Japan) Waseda University | Full | |
| 25 September 2023 | MF | (Japan) Jin Okumura | (Japan) Kansai University of Social Welfare | Full | |
| 8 December 2023 | FW | (Japan) Yuji Ono | (Japan) Sagan Tosu | Full | |
| 13 December 2023 | MF | (Japan) Eiji Miyamoto | (Japan) Iwaki FC | Full | |
| 13 December 2023 | DF | (Japan) Ryo Endo | (Japan) Iwaki FC | Loan return | |
| 23 December 2023 | MF | (Japan) Motoki Hasegawa | (Japan) Ventforet Kofu | Full | |
| 26 December 2023 | GK | (Japan) Daisuke Yoshimitsu | (Japan) Renofa Yamaguchi | Full | |
| 29 February 2024 | DF | (Japan) Hayato Inamura | (Japan) Toyo University | DSP | |
| 18 April 2024 | MF | (Japan) Keisuke Kasai | (Japan) Toin University of Yokohama | DSP | |

=== Departures ===
| Date | Position | Player | To | Type | Source |
|---|---|---|---|---|---|
| 30 November 2023 | FW | (Brazil) Gustavo Nescau | | Released | |
| 5 December 2023 | MF | (Japan) Takahiro Ko | (Japan) FC Tokyo | Full | |
| 15 December 2023 | GK | (Japan) Kazuki Fujita | (Japan) JEF United Chiba | Loan | |
| 15 December 2023 | MF | (Japan) Yushin Otake | (Japan) YSCC Yokohama | Loan | |
| 22 December 2023 | MF | (Japan) Shunsuke Mito | (Netherlands) Sparta Rotterdam | Full | |
| 25 December 2023 | MF | (Japan) Kazuyoshi Shimabuku | (Japan) Fujieda MYFC | Loan | |
| 27 December 2023 | DF | (Japan) Daichi Tagami | (Japan) Fagiano Okayama | Full | |
| 27 December 2023 | DF | (Japan) Taiki Watanabe | (Japan) Yokohama F. Marinos | Full | |
| 5 January 2024 | MF | (Japan) Jimpei Yoshida | (Japan) Kamatamare Sanuki | Loan | |
| 25 January 2024 | GK | (Japan) Takuya Seguchi | | Retired | |
| 21 March 2024 | DF | (Japan) Naoto Arai | (Japan) Sanfrecce Hiroshima | Full | |

== Avispa Fukuoka ==
=== Arrivals ===
| Date | Position | Player | From | Type | Source |
|---|---|---|---|---|---|
| 13 January 2023 | GK | (Japan) Kazuaki Suganuma | (Japan) Fukuoka University | Full | |
| 24 March 2023 | MF | (Japan) Masato Shigemi | (Japan) Fukuoka University | Full | |
| 26 December 2023 | MF | (Japan) Yuji Kitajima | (Japan) Tokyo Verdy | Loan return | |
| 29 December 2023 | FW | (Japan) Yuto Iwasaki | (Japan) Sagan Tosu | Full | |
| 30 December 2023 | MF | (Japan) Daiki Matsuoka | (Japan) Shimizu S-Pulse | Full | |
| 12 January 2024 | FW | (Switzerland) Nassim Ben Khalifa | (Japan) Sanfrecce Hiroshima | Full | |
| 7 February 2024 | DF | (Japan) Yu Hashimoto | (Japan) Fukuoka University | DSP | |
| 7 March 2024 | FW | (Iran) Shahab Zahedi | (Ukraine) FC Zorya Luhansk | Loan | |

=== Departures ===
| Date | Position | Player | To | Type | Source |
|---|---|---|---|---|---|
| 17 December 2023 | MF | (Japan) Sotan Tanabe | | Retired | |
| 25 December 2023 | DF | (Japan) KennedyEgbus Mikuni | (Japan) Nagoya Grampus | Full | |
| 27 December 2023 | GK | (Japan) Takumi Yamanoi | (Japan) Zweigen Kanazawa | Full | |
| 29 December 2023 | FW | (Japan) Yuya Yamagishi | (Japan) Nagoya Grampus | Full | |
| 5 January 2024 | MF | (Japan) Shun Nakamura | (Japan) Júbilo Iwata | Full | |
| 9 January 2024 | FW | (Brazil) Lukian | (Japan) Shonan Bellmare | Full | |

== Cerezo Osaka ==
=== Arrivals ===
| Date | Position | Player | From | Type | Source |
|---|---|---|---|---|---|
| 27 April 2023 | DF | (Japan) Hayato Okuda | (Japan) Momoyama Gakuin University | Full | |
| 29 December 2023 | FW | (Japan) Hiroto Yamada | (Japan) Vegalta Sendai | Loan return | |
| 30 December 2023 | DF | (Japan) Shunta Tanaka | (Japan) Hokkaido Consadole Sapporo | Full | |
| 6 January 2024 | DF | (Japan) Kyohei Noborizato | (Japan) Kawasaki Frontale | Full | |
| 10 January 2024 | MF | (Brazil) Lucas Fernandes | (Japan) Hokkaido Consadole Sapporo | Full | |
| 12 January 2024 | FW | (Brazil) Vitor Bueno | (Brazil) Athletico Paranaense | Full | |
| 12 January 2024 | MF | (Japan) Yuichi Hirano | (Japan) Urawa Red Diamonds | Full | |
| 30 January 2024 | FW | (Japan) Kengo Furuyama | (Japan) Osaka University HSS | DSP | |
| 12 March 2024 | DF | (Indonesia) Justin Hubner | (England) Wolverhampton Wanderers | Loan | |

=== Departures ===
| Date | Position | Player | To | Type | Source |
|---|---|---|---|---|---|
| 4 December 2023 | DF | (Japan) Yusuke Maruhashi | | Released | |
| 8 December 2023 | GK | (Japan) Kohei Maki | | Released | |
| 15 December 2023 | MF | (Japan) Rui Osako | (Japan) Iwaki FC | Loan | |
| 18 December 2023 | MF | (Japan) Nelson Ishiwatari | (Japan) Ehime FC | Loan | |
| 18 December 2023 | MF | (Japan) Riki Harakawa | (Japan) FC Tokyo | Full | |
| 20 December 2023 | DF | (Japan) Ryosuke Yamanaka | (Japan) Nagoya Grampus | Full | |
| 25 December 2023 | MF | (Japan) Hikaru Nakahara | (Japan) Sagan Tosu | Full | |
| 27 December 2023 | MF | (Japan) Nagi Matsumoto | (Japan) Montedio Yamagata | Loan | |
| 27 December 2023 | MF | (Japan) Haruki Arai | (Japan) FC Tiamo Hirakata | Loan return | |
| 28 December 2023 | DF | (Japan) Yusuke Maruhashi | (Japan) Sagan Tosu | Full | |
| 4 January 2024 | FW | (Japan) Ryuji Sawakami | (Japan) Fukushima United | Full | |
| 6 January 2024 | GK | (Japan) Kohei Maki | (Japan) Thespa Gunma | Full | |
| 6 January 2024 | MF | (Japan) Jun Nishikawa | (Japan) Iwaki FC | Loan | |
| 10 January 2024 | FW | (Japan) Shota Fujio | (Japan) FC Machida Zelvia | Full | |
| 11 January 2024 | DF | (Japan) Riku Matsuda | (Japan) Gamba Osaka | Full | |
| 11 January 2024 | MF | (Japan) Tokuma Suzuki | (Japan) Gamba Osaka | Full | |
| 24 January 2024 | DF | (Croatia) Matej Jonjić | (South Korea) Incheon United | Full | |
| 29 April 2024 | FW | (Japan) Shinnosuke Kinoshita | (Japan) Gainare Tottori | Loan | |

== FC Machida Zelvia ==
=== Arrivals ===
| Date | Position | Player | From | Type | Source |
|---|---|---|---|---|---|
| 21 April 2023 | MF | (Japan) Tenshiro Takasaki | (Japan) Quon Football Development | Full | |
| 10 May 2023 | DF | (Japan) Henry Heroki Mochizuki | (Japan) Kokushikan University | Full | |
| 8 September 2023 | FW | (Japan) Kosei Ashibe | (Japan) Kanto Gakuin University | Full | |
| 17 December 2023 | DF | (Japan) Yoshitaka Aoki | (Japan) ReinMeer Aomori | Loan return | |
| 19 December 2023 | FW | (Japan) Kazuki Fujimoto | (Japan) Oita Trinita | Full | |
| 25 December 2023 | DF | (Japan) Gen Shoji | (Japan) Kashima Antlers | Full | |
| 4 January 2024 | FW | (South Korea) Na Sang-ho | (South Korea) FC Seoul | Full | |
| 5 January 2024 | FW | (South Korea) Oh Se-hun | (Japan) Shimizu S-Pulse | Loan | |
| 6 January 2024 | GK | (Japan) Louis Yamaguchi | (Japan) Mito Hollyhock | Full | |
| 6 January 2024 | DF | (Japan) Kotaro Hayashi | (Japan) Yokohama FC | Full | |
| 9 January 2024 | MF | (Japan) Atsushi Kurokawa | (Japan) Omiya Ardija | Loan return | |
| 9 January 2024 | MF | (Japan) Kai Shibato | (Japan) Urawa Red Diamonds | Loan | |
| 10 January 2024 | MF | (Japan) Ken Higuchi | (Japan) Okinawa SV | Loan return | |
| 10 January 2024 | FW | (Japan) Shota Fujio | (Japan) Cerezo Osaka | Full | |
| 11 January 2024 | MF | (Japan) Keiya Sento | (Japan) Kashiwa Reysol | Full | |
| 11 January 2024 | DF | (Japan) Takumi Narasaka | (Japan) Kamatamare Sanuki | Loan return | |
| 12 January 2024 | GK | (Japan) Kosei Tani | (Japan) Gamba Osaka | Loan | |
| 12 January 2024 | FW | (Japan) Shunta Araki | (Japan) Sagan Tosu | Full | |
| 18 January 2024 | DF | (Kosovo) Ibrahim Drešević | (Turkey) Fatih Karagümrük | Full | |
| 12 April 2024 | FW | (Japan) Kanji Kuwayama | (Japan) Tokai University | DSP | |

=== Departures ===
| Date | Position | Player | To | Type | Source |
|---|---|---|---|---|---|
| 3 October 2023 | DF | (Japan) Kosuke Ota | | Retired | |
| 21 November 2023 | GK | (Serbia) Nedeljko Stojišić | | Released | |
| 8 December 2023 | FW | (Japan) Yuya Takazawa | (Japan) Thespa Gunma | Full | |
| 4 January 2024 | DF | (Japan) Shohei Takahashi | (Japan) Matsumoto Yamaga | Full | |
| 5 January 2024 | MF | (Japan) Renji Matsui | (Japan) Kawasaki Frontale | Loan return | |
| 5 January 2024 | DF | (Japan) Yudai Fujiwara | (Japan) Urawa Red Diamonds | Loan return | |
| 6 January 2024 | MF | (Japan) Sho Fuseya | (Japan) Kataller Toyama | Loan | |
| 6 January 2024 | DF | (Japan) Hijiri Onaga | (Japan) Tokyo Verdy | Full | |
| 8 January 2024 | FW | (Japan) Daiki Sato | (Japan) Blaublitz Akita | Loan | |
| 9 January 2024 | GK | (Japan) William Popp | (Japan) Yokohama F. Marinos | Full | |
| 11 January 2024 | DF | (Japan) Mizuki Uchida | (Japan) Kamatamare Sanuki | Loan | |
| 28 February 2024 | FW | (Brazil) Ademilson | (Brazil) Avaí FC | Full | |
| 27 March 2024 | MF | (Japan) Atsushi Kurokawa | (Japan) Mito HollyHock | Loan | |
| 19 April 2024 | DF | (Japan) Takumi Narasaka | (Japan) Kamatamare Sanuki | Loan | |
| 26 April 2024 | MF | (Japan) Ken Higuchi | (Japan) Okinawa SV | Loan | |

== FC Tokyo ==
=== Arrivals ===
| 19 June 2023 | DF | (Japan) Teppei Oka | (Japan) Meiji University | Full |
| 5 December 2023 | MF | (Japan) Takahiro Ko | (Japan) Albirex Niigata | Full |
| 18 December 2023 | MF | (Japan) Riki Harakawa | (Japan) Cerezo Osaka | Full |
| 22 December 2023 | GK | (Japan) Go Hatano | (Japan) V-Varen Nagasaki | Loan return |
| 24 December 2023 | MF | (Japan) Ryotaro Araki | (Japan) Kashima Antlers | Loan |
| 25 December 2023 | FW | (Japan) Tsuyoshi Ogashiwa | (Japan) Hokkaido Consadole Sapporo | Full |
| 28 December 2023 | DF | (Japan) Renta Higashi | (Japan) SC Sagamihara | Loan return |
| 6 January 2024 | FW | (Japan) Leon Nozawa | (Japan) Matsumoto Yamaga | Loan return |
| 7 January 2024 | MF | (Japan) Keita Endo | (Germany) 1. FC Union Berlin | Loan |
| 10 January 2024 | MF | (Japan) Kojiro Yasuda | (Japan) Tochigi SC | Loan return |
| 10 January 2024 | MF | (Japan) Manato Shinada | (Japan) Ventforet Kofu | Loan return |
| 31 January 2024 | DF | (South Korea) Baek In-hwan | (South Korea) Cheonan Jeil High School | Full |
| 7 February 2024 | MF | (Japan) Soma Anzai | (Japan) Waseda University | Full |
| 11 April 2024 | MF | (Japan) Keita Endo | (Germany) 1. FC Union Berlin | Full |

=== Departures ===
| Date | Position | Player | To | Type | Source |
|---|---|---|---|---|---|
| 2 December 2023 | FW | (Brazil) Pedro Perotti | (Brazil) Chapecoense | Loan return | |
| 21 December 2023 | DF | (Japan) Rio Omori | (Japan) Iwaki FC | Loan | |
| 22 December 2023 | DF | (Japan) Seiji Kimura | (Japan) Sagan Tosu | Loan | |
| 27 December 2023 | MF | (Japan) Takuya Uchida | (Japan) Nagoya Grampus | Full | |
| 28 December 2023 | DF | (Japan) Sodai Hasukawa | (Japan) Shimizu S-Pulse | Loan | |
| 5 January 2024 | MF | (Japan) Hisatoshi Nishido | (Japan) Kagoshima United | Loan | |
| 5 January 2024 | MF | (Brazil) Arthur Silva | (Japan) Omiya Ardija | Full | |
| 6 January 2024 | DF | (Japan) Shuto Okaniwa | (Japan) JEF United Chiba | Loan | |
| 7 January 2024 | DF | (Japan) Ryoma Watanabe | (Japan) Urawa Red Diamonds | Full | |
| 10 January 2023 | MF | (Brazil) Adaílton | (Japan) Ventforet Kofu | Full | |
| 10 January 2024 | MF | (Japan) Koki Tsukagawa | (Japan) Kyoto Sanga | Loan | |
| 23 January 2024 | GK | (Poland) Jakub Słowik | (Turkey) Konyaspor | Full | |
| 26 January 2024 | FW | (Japan) Naoki Kumata | (Belgium) KRC Genk | Loan | |
| 31 January 2024 | DF | (South Korea) Baek In-hwan | (Japan) Zweigen Kanazawa | Loan | |
| 27 February 2024 | MF | (Japan) Takuya Aoki | (Japan) FC Gifu | Full | |
| 19 March 2024 | MF | (Japan) Kojiro Yasuda | (Japan) Tegevajaro Miyazaki | Loan | |
| 26 March 2024 | MF | (Japan) Manato Shinada | (Japan) JEF United Chiba | Loan | |

== Gamba Osaka ==
=== Arrivals ===
| Date | Position | Player | From | Type | Source |
|---|---|---|---|---|---|
| 22 August 2022 | DF | (Japan) Ibuki Konno | (Japan) Hosei University | Full | |
| 12 October 2022 | MF | (Japan) Rin Mito | (Japan) Kwansei Gakuin University | Full | |
| 21 December 2023 | DF | (Japan) Shinnosuke Nakatani | (Japan) Nagoya Grampus | Full | |
| 25 December 2023 | DF | (Japan) Shinya Nakano | (Japan) Sagan Tosu | Full | |
| 26 December 2023 | FW | (Japan) Ryoya Yamashita | (Japan) Yokohama FC | Full | |
| 28 December 2023 | GK | (Japan) Jun Ichimori | (Japan) Yokohama F. Marinos | Loan return | |
| 28 December 2023 | MF | (Japan) Takeru Kishimoto | (Japan) Shimizu S-Pulse | Full | |
| 29 December 2023 | FW | (Japan) Isa Sakamoto | (Japan) Fagiano Okayama | Loan return | |
| 29 December 2023 | MF | (Japan) Kota Yamada | (Japan) Kashiwa Reysol | Full | |
| 10 January 2024 | DF | (Japan) Keisuke Saka | (Japan) Oita Trinita | Full | |
| 11 January 2024 | DF | (Japan) Riku Matsuda | (Japan) Cerezo Osaka | Full | |
| 11 January 2024 | MF | (Japan) Tokuma Suzuki | (Japan) Cerezo Osaka | Full | |
| 11 February 2024 | FW | (Brazil) Welton Felipe | (Bulgaria) Levski Sofia | Full | |

=== Departures ===
| Date | Position | Player | To | Type | Source |
|---|---|---|---|---|---|
| 2 December 2023 | MF | (Japan) Dai Tsukamoto | | Released | |
| 21 December 2023 | FW | (Japan) Hiroto Yamami | (Japan) Tokyo Verdy | Loan | |
| 25 December 2023 | FW | (Japan) Musashi Suzuki | (Japan) Hokkaido Consadole Sapporo | Loan | |
| 25 December 2023 | MF | (Japan) Kohei Okuno | (Japan) Shonan Bellmare | Full | |
| 25 December 2023 | MF | (Japan) Yuki Yamamoto | (Japan) Kawasaki Frontale | Full | |
| 26 December 2023 | GK | (Japan) Akinori Ichikawa | (Japan) Yokohama FC | Loan return | |
| 26 December 2023 | DF | (Japan) Ko Yanagisawa | (Japan) Tokushima Vortis | Full | |
| 27 December 2023 | DF | (Japan) Yota Sato | (Japan) Urawa Red Diamonds | Full | |
| 28 December 2023 | DF | (Japan) Hiroki Fujiharu | (Japan) FC Ryukyu | Full | |
| 29 December 2023 | MF | (Japan) Naohiro Sugiyama | (Japan) Montedio Yamagata | Loan | |
| 29 December 2023 | FW | (Japan) Harumi Minamino | (Japan) Tochigi SC | Loan | |
| 30 December 2023 | FW | (Japan) Ryuta Takahashi | (Japan) Giravanz Kitakyushu | Loan | |
| 10 January 2024 | DF | (Japan) Ryu Takao | (Japan) Hokkaido Consadole Sapporo | Full | |
| 12 January 2024 | GK | (Japan) Kosei Tani | (Japan) FC Machida Zelvia | Loan | |
| 2 February 2024 | DF | (South Korea) Kwon Kyung-won | (South Korea) Suwon FC | Full | |

== Hokkaido Consadole Sapporo ==
=== Arrivals ===
| Date | Position | Player | From | Type | Source |
|---|---|---|---|---|---|
| 29 November 2022 | DF | (Japan) Yamato Okada | (Japan) Fukuoka University | Full | |
| 17 May 2023 | MF | (Japan) Katsuyuki Tanaka | (Japan) Meiji University | Full | |
| 1 December 2023 | DF | (Japan) Hiromu Tanaka | (Japan) Fujieda MYFC | Loan return | |
| 15 December 2023 | DF | (Japan) Rei Ieizumi | (Japan) Iwaki FC | Full | |
| 25 December 2023 | FW | (Japan) Musashi Suzuki | (Japan) Gamba Osaka | Loan | |
| 30 December 2023 | GK | (Japan) Shunta Awaka | (Japan) Suzuka Point Getters | Full | |
| 30 December 2023 | MF | (Japan) Tomoki Kondo | (Japan) Yokohama FC | Full | |
| 5 January 2024 | GK | (Japan) Kojiro Nakano | (Japan) Zweigen Kanazawa | Loan return | |
| 10 January 2024 | DF | (Japan) Ryu Takao | (Japan) Gamba Osaka | Full | |
| 12 January 2024 | MF | (Japan) Tatsuya Hasegawa | (Japan) Yokohama FC | Full | |
| 31 January 2024 | MF | (Japan) Kosuke Hara | (Japan) Nagoya High School | Full | |
| 16 February 2024 | MF | (Japan) Shuma Kido | (Japan) Osaka University HSS | DSP | |
| 26 March 2024 | GK | (Japan) Jun Kodama | (Japan) YSCC Yokohama | Full | |

=== Departures ===
| Date | Position | Player | To | Type | Source |
|---|---|---|---|---|---|
| 27 September 2023 | MF | (Japan) Shinji Ono | | Retired | |
| 5 December 2023 | DF | (Slovenia) Milan Tučić | | Released | |
| 5 December 2023 | GK | (Japan) Koki Otani | | Released | |
| 16 December 2023 | MF | (Japan) Sora Ogawa | (Japan) Fagiano Okayama | Full | |
| 25 December 2023 | FW | (Japan) Tsuyoshi Ogashiwa | (Japan) FC Tokyo | Full | |
| 26 December 2023 | GK | (Japan) Koki Otani | (Japan) Giravanz Kitakyushu | Full | |
| 29 December 2023 | DF | (Japan) Akito Fukumori | (Japan) Yokohama FC | Loan | |
| 29 December 2023 | FW | (Japan) Taika Nakashima | (Japan) Fujieda MYFC | Loan | |
| 30 December 2023 | DF | (Japan) Shunta Tanaka | (Japan) Cerezo Osaka | Full | |
| 30 December 2023 | GK | (Japan) Shuhei Matsubara | (Japan) Mito Hollyhock | Full | |
| 9 January 2024 | DF | (Japan) Daigo Nishi | (Japan) Iwate Grulla Morioka | Full | |
| 10 January 2024 | MF | (Brazil) Lucas Fernandes | (Japan) Cerezo Osaka | Full | |
| 10 January 2024 | GK | (South Korea) Gu Sung-yun | (Japan) Kyoto Sanga | Full | |

== Júbilo Iwata ==
=== Arrivals ===
| Date | Position | Player | From | Type | Source |
|---|---|---|---|---|---|
| 7 July 2022 | MF | (Japan) Hiroto Uemura | (Japan) Waseda University | Full | |
| 14 April 2023 | GK | (Japan) Mitsuki Sugimoto | (Japan) Rissho University | Full | |
| 28 April 2023 | GK | (Japan) Kotaro Nakajima | (Japan) Tokoha University | Full | |
| 21 December 2023 | MF | (Japan) Keita Takahata | (Japan) Oita Trinita | Full | |
| 26 December 2023 | MF | (Japan) Ikki Kawasaki | (Japan) Kamatamare Sanuki | Full | |
| 26 December 2023 | DF | (South Korea) Park Se-gi | (Japan) Toho High School | Full | |
| 30 December 2023 | MF | (Japan) Rei Hirakawa | (Japan) Roasso Kumamoto | Full | |
| 31 December 2023 | FW | (Brazil) Weverton | (United States) New England Revolution II | Full | |
| 31 December 2023 | MF | (Brazil) Bruno José | (Brazil) Guarani | Full | |
| 31 December 2023 | MF | (Brazil) Léo Gomes | (Brazil) Vitória | Full | |
| 31 December 2023 | FW | (Brazil) Matheus Peixoto | (Brazil) Atlético Goianiense | Full | |
| 5 January 2024 | GK | (Japan) Yuya Tsuboi | (Japan) Vissel Kobe | Loan | |
| 5 January 2024 | MF | (Japan) Shun Nakamura | (Japan) Avispa Fukuoka | Full | |
| 5 January 2024 | MF | (Japan) Masatoshi Ishida | (South Korea) Daejeon Hana Citizen | Full | |
| 6 January 2024 | DF | (Japan) Shunsuke Nishikubo | (Japan) JEF United Chiba | Full | |
| 12 January 2024 | GK | (Japan) Eiji Kawashima | | Free agent | |
| 22 March 2024 | MF | (Japan) Koshiro Sumi | (Japan) University of Tsukuba | DSP | |
| 17 May 2024 | DF | (Japan) Ryusei Yoshimura | (Japan) Kansai University | DSP | |

=== Departures ===
| Date | Position | Player | To | Type | Source |
|---|---|---|---|---|---|
| 2 November 2023 | GK | (Japan) Naoki Hatta | | Retired | |
| 28 November 2023 | FW | (Japan) Keisuke Goto | (Belgium) RSC Anderlecht | Loan | |
| 8 December 2023 | MF | (Japan) So Nakagawa | (Japan) Fujieda MYFC | Full | |
| 23 December 2023 | MF | (Japan) Yuto Suzuki | (Japan) Shonan Bellmare | Full | |
| 25 December 2023 | FW | (Japan) Yuki Otsu | | Retired | |
| 26 December 2023 | FW | (Japan) Mahiro Yoshinaga | (Japan) Kamatamare Sanuki | Loan | |
| 26 December 2023 | FW | (Japan) Naoto Miki | (Japan) Gainare Tottori | Full | |
| 28 December 2023 | FW | (Colombia) Fabián González | (Japan) Ventforet Kofu | Full | |
| 28 December 2023 | GK | (Japan) Yuji Kajikawa | (Japan) Kashima Antlers | Full | |
| 28 December 2023 | MF | (Japan) Kosuke Yamamoto | (Japan) Matsumoto Yamaga | Full | |
| 29 December 2023 | GK | (Japan) Kotaro Nakajima | (Japan) Tochigi SC | Loan | |
| 31 December 2023 | DF | (Japan) Norimichi Yamamoto | (Japan) Zweigen Kanazawa | Full | |
| 6 January 2024 | MF | (Japan) Takeaki Harigaya | (Japan) Fukushima United | Full | |
| 6 January 2024 | MF | (Brazil) Dudu | (Japan) JEF United Chiba | Full | |
| 7 January 2024 | MF | (Japan) Naoya Seita | (Japan) Ococias Kyoto AC | Full | |
| 9 January 2024 | FW | (Japan) Kenyu Sugimoto | (Japan) Omiya Ardija | Loan | |
| 9 January 2024 | MF | (Japan) Yasuhito Endo | | Retired | |
| 12 January 2024 | DF | (Japan) Ryo Takano | (Japan) SC Sagamihara | Full | |
| 26 January 2024 | DF | (Japan) Kotaro Omori | (Thailand) Muangthong United | Loan | |

== Kashima Antlers ==
=== Arrivals ===
| Date | Position | Player | From | Type | Source |
|---|---|---|---|---|---|
| 9 June 2023 | DF | (Japan) Kimito Nono | (Japan) Kwansei Gakuin University | Full | |
| 8 December 2023 | GK | (Japan) Taiki Yamada | (Japan) Fagiano Okayama | Loan return | |
| 24 December 2023 | MF | (Brazil) Guilherme Parede | (Argentina) Talleres | Loan | |
| 28 December 2023 | GK | (Japan) Yuji Kajikawa | (Japan) Júbilo Iwata | Full | |
| 29 January 2024 | FW | (Serbia) Aleksandar Čavrić | (Slovakia) Slovan Bratislava | Loan | |
| 22 March 2024 | MF | (Serbia) Radomir Milosavljević | (Serbia) FK Vojvodina | Full | |

=== Departures ===
| Date | Position | Player | To | Type | Source |
|---|---|---|---|---|---|
| 30 November 2023 | GK | (South Korea) Kwoun Sun-tae | | Retired | |
| 7 December 2023 | FW | (Nigeria) Blessing Eleke | | Released | |
| 7 December 2023 | MF | (Brazil) Arthur Caíke | | Released | |
| 7 December 2023 | MF | (Brazil) Diego Pituca | (Brazil) Santos | Full | |
| 8 December 2023 | MF | (Japan) Yusuke Ogawa | (Japan) FC Ryukyu | Loan | |
| 24 December 2023 | MF | (Japan) Ryotaro Araki | (Japan) FC Tokyo | Loan | |
| 25 December 2023 | DF | (Japan) Gen Shoji | (Japan) FC Machida Zelvia | Full | |
| 26 December 2023 | MF | (Japan) Ryotaro Nakamura | (Japan) Shimizu S-Pulse | Loan | |
| 26 December 2023 | GK | (Japan) Yuya Oki | (Japan) Shimizu S-Pulse | Full | |
| 3 January 2024 | DF | (South Korea) Kim Min-tae | (Japan) Shonan Bellmare | Full | |
| 5 January 2024 | DF | (Japan) Rikuto Hirose | (Japan) Vissel Kobe | Full | |

== Kashiwa Reysol ==
=== Arrivals ===
| Date | Position | Player | From | Type | Source |
|---|---|---|---|---|---|
| 20 July 2023 | MF | (Japan) Koki Kumasaka | (Japan) Tokyo International University | Full | |
| 28 December 2023 | MF | (Japan) Fumiya Unoki | (Japan) Mito Hollyhock | Loan return | |
| 29 December 2023 | FW | (Japan) Kosuke Kinoshita | (Japan) Kyoto Sanga | Full | |
| 29 December 2023 | DF | (Japan) Tomoya Inukai | (Japan) Urawa Red Diamonds | Full | |
| 30 December 2023 | DF | (Japan) Hiroki Noda | (Japan) Montedio Yamagata | Full | |
| 5 January 2024 | DF | (Japan) Takuya Shimamura | (Japan) Roasso Kumamoto | Full | |
| 6 January 2024 | MF | (Japan) Eiji Shirai | (Japan) Tokushima Vortis | Full | |
| 9 January 2024 | FW | (Japan) Yugo Masukake | (Japan) Ehime FC | Loan return | |
| 12 January 2024 | DF | (Japan) Hiroki Sekine | (Japan) Takushoku University | Full | |
| 5 April 2024 | DF | (Japan) Taisei Kuwata | (Japan) Chukyo University | DSP | |

=== Departures ===
| Date | Position | Player | To | Type | Source |
|---|---|---|---|---|---|
| 9 December 2023 | MF | (Japan) Masatoshi Mihara | | Released | |
| 14 December 2023 | DF | (Japan) Takuma Otake | | Released | |
| 20 December 2023 | DF | (Brazil) Bueno | | Released | |
| 27 December 2023 | MF | (Japan) Keiya Shiihashi | (Japan) Nagoya Grampus | Full | |
| 28 December 2023 | DF | (Brazil) Emerson Santos | | Released | |
| 29 December 2023 | MF | (Japan) Kota Yamada | (Japan) Gamba Osaka | Full | |
| 30 December 2023 | MF | (Japan) Riku Ochiai | (Japan) Mito Hollyhock | Loan | |
| 4 January 2024 | FW | (Japan) Kaito Mori | (Japan) Yokohama FC | Full | |
| 5 January 2024 | DF | (Japan) Wataru Iwashita | (Japan) Roasso Kumamoto | Loan | |
| 5 January 2024 | MF | (Japan) Takuto Kato | (Japan) Fukushima United | Loan | |
| 10 January 2024 | DF | (Japan) Takuma Otake | (Japan) Edo All United | Full | |
| 11 January 2024 | MF | (Japan) Keiya Sento | (Japan) FC Machida Zelvia | Full | |
| 11 January 2024 | DF | (Japan) Hayato Tanaka | (Japan) V-Varen Nagasaki | Loan | |
| 19 January 2024 | MF | (Brazil) Angelotti | (Japan) FC Imabari | Full | |
| 16 February 2024 | FW | (Brazil) Douglas | | Retired | |

== Kawasaki Frontale ==
=== Arrivals ===
| Date | Position | Player | From | Type | Source |
|---|---|---|---|---|---|
| 21 February 2023 | MF | (Japan) Hinata Yamauchi | (Japan) Toin University of Yokohama | Full | |
| 18 October 2023 | FW | (Japan) Soma Kanda | (Japan) Shizuoka Gakuen High School | Full | |
| 22 December 2023 | FW | (Japan) Ten Miyagi | (Japan) Montedio Yamagata | Loan return | |
| 22 December 2023 | DF | (Japan) Sota Miura | (Japan) Ventforet Kofu | Full | |
| 25 December 2023 | MF | (Japan) Yuki Yamamoto | (Japan) Gamba Osaka | Full | |
| 4 January 2024 | MF | (Japan) Yuichi Maruyama | (Japan) Nagoya Grampus | Full | |
| 5 January 2024 | MF | (Japan) Renji Matsui | (Japan) FC Machida Zelvia | Loan return | |
| 5 January 2024 | MF | (Brazil) Zé Ricardo | (Brazil) Goiás | Full | |
| 5 January 2024 | MF | (Brazil) Patrick Verhon | (Brazil) Bahia | Full | |
| 8 January 2024 | FW | (Brazil) Erison | (Brazil) Botafogo | Full | |
| 21 January 2024 | DF | (Netherlands) Sai van Wermeskerken | (Netherlands) NEC Nijmegen | Full | |

=== Departures ===
| Date | Position | Player | To | Type | Source |
|---|---|---|---|---|---|
| 10 December 2023 | DF | (Brazil) João Schmidt | | Released | |
| 19 December 2023 | FW | (Japan) Kaito Kamiya | (Japan) Ventforet Kofu | Full | |
| 27 December 2023 | MF | (Japan) Takatora Einaga | (Japan) Thespa Gunma | Loan | |
| 28 December 2023 | MF | (Japan) Toya Myogan | (Japan) Vegalta Sendai | Loan | |
| 28 December 2023 | MF | (Japan) Yuto Ozeki | (Japan) Fukushima United | Loan | |
| 28 December 2023 | DF | (Japan) Yuto Matsunagane | (Japan) Fukushima United | Loan | |
| 4 January 2024 | MF | (Japan) Kazuya Yamamura | (Japan) Yokohama F. Marinos | Full | |
| 6 January 2024 | DF | (Japan) Miki Yamane | (United States) Los Angeles Galaxy | Full | |
| 6 January 2024 | FW | (Japan) Taisei Miyashiro | (Japan) Vissel Kobe | Full | |
| 6 January 2024 | DF | (Japan) Kyohei Noborizato | (Japan) Cerezo Osaka | Full | |
| 8 February 2024 | FW | (Brazil) Leandro Damião | (Brazil) Coritiba | Full | |
| 8 February 2024 | MF | (Japan) Koki Harada | (Japan) ReinMeer Aomori | Full | |
| 12 March 2024 | MF | (Japan) Renji Matsui | (Japan) Vegalta Sendai | Loan | |

== Kyoto Sanga ==
=== Arrivals ===
| Date | Position | Player | From | Type | Source |
|---|---|---|---|---|---|
| 10 December 2023 | MF | (Japan) Yuto Anzai | (Japan) Shoshi High School | Full | |
| 21 December 2023 | DF | (Japan) Keita Matsuda | (Japan) Mito Hollyhock | Loan return | |
| 26 December 2023 | DF | (Japan) Yuta Miyamoto | (Japan) Urawa Red Diamonds | Loan | |
| 27 December 2023 | DF | (Japan) Yoshinori Suzuki | (Japan) Shimizu S-Pulse | Full | |
| 28 December 2023 | FW | (Brazil) Marco Túlio | (Australia) Central Coast Mariners | Full | |
| 28 December 2023 | MF | (Japan) Toichi Suzuki | (Switzerland) FC Lausanne-Sport | Full | |
| 10 January 2024 | MF | (Japan) Koki Tsukagawa | (Japan) FC Tokyo | Loan | |
| 10 January 2024 | GK | (South Korea) Gu Sung-yun | (Japan) Hokkaido Consadole Sapporo | Full | |
| 12 January 2024 | GK | (Japan) Akira Fantini | (Japan) Fukushima United | Full | |
| 28 February 2024 | MF | (Japan) Ryuma Nakano | (Japan) Ritsumeikan University | DSP | |

=== Departures ===
| Date | Position | Player | To | Type | Source |
|---|---|---|---|---|---|
| 12 December 2023 | FW | (Japan) Kazuki Tanaka | (Japan) JEF United Chiba | Full | |
| 25 December 2023 | DF | (Japan) Osamu Henry Iyoha | (Japan) Sanfrecce Hiroshima | Loan return | |
| 25 December 2023 | GK | (Japan) Tomoya Wakahara | (Japan) V-Varen Nagasaki | Loan | |
| 26 December 2023 | FW | (Japan) Fuki Yamada | (Japan) Tokyo Verdy | Loan | |
| 27 December 2023 | MF | (Japan) Naoto Misawa | (Japan) Ventforet Kofu | Full | |
| 27 December 2023 | DF | (Japan) Rikito Inoue | (Japan) Urawa Red Diamonds | Full | |
| 28 December 2023 | DF | (Japan) Yuta Ueda | (Japan) Omiya Ardija | Loan | |
| 28 December 2023 | MF | (Japan) Yudai Kimura | (Japan) Tokyo Verdy | Loan | |
| 29 December 2023 | FW | (Japan) Kosuke Kinoshita | (Japan) Kashiwa Reysol | Full | |
| 4 January 2024 | FW | (Nigeria) Origbaajo Ismaila | (Japan) Tochigi SC | Full | |
| 9 January 2024 | FW | (Brazil) Patric | (Japan) Nagoya Grampus | Full | |
| 10 January 2024 | MF | (Japan) Daigo Araki | (Japan) FC Gifu | Full | |
| 16 January 2024 | DF | (Japan) Takahiro Iida | (Japan) Ventforet Kofu | Loan | |
| 17 January 2024 | GK | (New Zealand) Michael Woud | | Released | |

== Nagoya Grampus ==
=== Arrivals ===
| Date | Position | Player | From | Type | Source |
|---|---|---|---|---|---|
| 10 May 2022 | MF | (Japan) Kyota Sakakibara | (Japan) Rissho University | Full | |
| 11 September 2022 | MF | (Japan) Ken Masui | (Japan) Kwansei Gakuin University | Full | |
| 20 December 2023 | DF | (Japan) Ryosuke Yamanaka | (Japan) Cerezo Osaka | Full | |
| 25 December 2023 | DF | (Japan) KennedyEgbus Mikuni | (Japan) Avispa Fukuoka | Full | |
| 26 December 2023 | MF | (Japan) Katsuhiro Nakayama | (Japan) Shimizu S-Pulse | Full | |
| 27 December 2023 | MF | (Japan) Takuya Uchida | (Japan) FC Tokyo | Full | |
| 27 December 2023 | MF | (Japan) Keiya Shiihashi | (Japan) Kashiwa Reysol | Full | |
| 27 December 2023 | MF | (Japan) Masahito Ono | (Japan) Montedio Yamagata | Full | |
| 29 December 2023 | FW | (Japan) Yuya Yamagishi | (Japan) Avispa Fukuoka | Full | |
| 6 January 2024 | DF | (Japan) Shion Inoue | (Japan) Ventforet Kofu | Full | |
| 7 January 2024 | MF | (Japan) Shumpei Naruse | (Japan) Mito HollyHock | Loan return | |
| 9 January 2024 | FW | (Brazil) Patric | (Japan) Kyoto Sanga | Full | |
| 10 January 2024 | DF | (South Korea) Ha Chang-rae | (South Korea) Pohang Steelers | Full | |
| 11 January 2024 | FW | (Denmark) Kasper Junker | (Japan) Urawa Red Diamonds | Full | |

=== Departures ===
| Date | Position | Player | To | Type | Source |
|---|---|---|---|---|---|
| 21 December 2023 | DF | (Japan) Shinnosuke Nakatani | (Japan) Gamba Osaka | Full | |
| 22 December 2023 | DF | (Japan) Ryoya Morishita | (Poland) Legia Warsaw | Loan | |
| 26 December 2023 | MF | (Japan) Riku Yamada | (Japan) V-Varen Nagasaki | Full | |
| 29 December 2023 | GK | (Japan) John Higashi | (Japan) FC Ryukyu | Loan | |
| 29 December 2023 | FW | (Japan) Taika Nakashima | (Japan) Hokkaido Consadole Sapporo | Loan return | |
| 29 December 2023 | MF | (Japan) Hidemasa Koda | (Japan) Mito Hollyhock | Loan | |
| 4 January 2024 | MF | (Japan) Yuichi Maruyama | (Japan) Kawasaki Frontale | Full | |
| 6 January 2024 | FW | (Japan) Koki Toyoda | (Japan) Iwate Grulla Morioka | Loan | |
| 7 January 2024 | FW | (Japan) Naoki Maeda | (Japan) Urawa Red Diamonds | Full | |
| 10 January 2024 | DF | (Japan) Haruya Fujii | (Belgium) KV Kortrijk | Loan | |
| 4 February 2024 | FW | (Japan) Ryoga Kida | (Argentina) Argentinos Juniors | Loan | |
| 3 March 2024 | MF | (Japan) Takuya Shigehiro | (South Korea) FC Seoul | Loan | |
| 21 March 2024 | GK | (Japan) Daiki Mitsui | (Japan) Tokushima Vortis | Loan | |
| 2 April 2024 | DF | (Japan) Shumpei Naruse | (Japan) V-Varen Nagasaki | Loan | |

== Sagan Tosu ==
=== Arrivals ===
| Date | Position | Player | From | Type | Source |
|---|---|---|---|---|---|
| 6 April 2023 | DF | (Japan) Shiva Tafari Nagasawa | (Japan) Kanto Gakuin University | Full | |
| 20 June 2023 | MF | (Japan) Ryohei Watanabe | (Japan) Hosei University | Full | |
| 15 December 2023 | GK | (South Korea) Lee Yun-sung | (South Korea) Uijeongbu SSC | Full | |
| 19 December 2023 | DF | (Japan) Katsunori Ueebisu | (Japan) Oita Trinita | Full | |
| 22 December 2023 | DF | (Japan) Seiji Kimura | (Japan) FC Tokyo | Loan | |
| 22 December 2023 | GK | (Spain) Arnau Riera | (Japan) Nara Club | Full | |
| 22 December 2023 | FW | (Brazil) Vinícius Araújo | (Japan) FC Imabari | Full | |
| 25 December 2023 | MF | (Japan) Hikaru Nakahara | (Japan) Cerezo Osaka | Full | |
| 28 December 2023 | DF | (Japan) Yusuke Maruhashi | (Japan) Cerezo Osaka | Full | |
| 7 January 2024 | FW | (Brazil) Marcelo Ryan | (Japan) Yokohama FC | Full | |
| 10 January 2024 | DF | (South Korea) Kim Tae-hyeon | (South Korea) Ulsan HD | Full | |
| 12 January 2024 | MF | (Japan) Shota Hino | (Japan) Takushoku University | Full | |
| 1 February 2024 | DF | (Japan) Taisei Inoue | (Japan) Juntendo University | DSP | |

=== Departures ===
| Date | Position | Player | To | Type | Source |
|---|---|---|---|---|---|
| 8 December 2023 | FW | (Japan) Yuji Ono | (Japan) Albirex Niigata | Full | |
| 19 December 2023 | DF | (Japan) Taiga Son | (Japan) Ventforet Kofu | Full | |
| 20 December 2023 | FW | (Japan) Yukihito Kajiya | (Japan) Blaublitz Akita | Full | |
| 20 December 2023 | GK | (Japan) Kei Uchiyama | (Japan) Fujieda MYFC | Loan | |
| 20 December 2023 | MF | (Japan) Ryunosuke Sagara | (Japan) Vegalta Sendai | Full | |
| 25 December 2023 | DF | (Japan) Shinya Nakano | (Japan) Gamba Osaka | Full | |
| 27 December 2023 | FW | (Japan) Yuta Fujiwara | (Japan) Ehime FC | Full | |
| 28 December 2023 | DF | (Japan) Kiriya Sakamoto | (Japan) Montedio Yamagata | Loan return | |
| 29 December 2023 | FW | (Japan) Yuto Iwasaki | (Japan) Avispa Fukuoka | Full | |
| 5 January 2024 | MF | (Japan) Toshio Shimakawa | (Japan) Tokushima Vortis | Full | |
| 6 January 2024 | MF | (Japan) Jun Nishikawa | (Japan) Cerezo Osaka | Loan return | |
| 6 January 2024 | MF | (Japan) Shunya Sakai | (Japan) Tegevajaro Miyazaki | Loan | |
| 7 January 2024 | FW | (Japan) Ouji Kawanami | (Japan) FC Gifu | Loan | |
| 8 December 2023 | DF | (South Korea) Hwang Seok-ho | (South Korea) Ulsan HD | Full | |
| 10 January 2024 | DF | (Kenya) Teddy Akumu | | Contract terminated | |
| 11 January 2024 | DF | (Japan) Koma Osato | (Japan) Reilac Shiga | Loan | |
| 12 January 2024 | FW | (Japan) Shunta Araki | (Japan) FC Machida Zelvia | Full | |
| 25 January 2024 | FW | (Japan) Ryo Wada | Hong Kong Rangers | Full | |
| 17 February 2024 | GK | (South Korea) Ueom Ye-hoon | (South Korea) Seoul E-Land | Full | |
| 25 April 2024 | GK | (South Korea) Koh Bong-jo | (Japan) Ventforet Kofu | Loan | |

== Sanfrecce Hiroshima ==
=== Arrivals ===
| Date | Position | Player | From | Type | Source |
|---|---|---|---|---|---|
| 19 September 2023 | MF | (Japan) Kohei Hosoya | (Japan) Hosei University | Full | |
| 25 December 2023 | DF | (Japan) Osamu Henry Iyoha | (Japan) Kyoto Sanga | Loan return | |
| 25 December 2023 | MF | (Japan) Motoki Ohara | (Japan) Mito Hollyhock | Loan return | |
| 28 December 2023 | GK | (Japan) Haruto Usui | (Japan) Matsumoto Yamaga | Loan | |
| 9 January 2024 | FW | (Japan) Yuki Ohashi | (Japan) Shonan Bellmare | Full | |
| 21 March 2024 | DF | (Japan) Naoto Arai | (Japan) Albirex Niigata | Full | |
| 12 April 2024 | GK | (Japan) Cailen Hill | (Japan) Waseda University | DSP | |

=== Departures ===
| Date | Position | Player | To | Type | Source |
|---|---|---|---|---|---|
| 20 November 2023 | GK | (Japan) Takuto Hayashi | | Retired | |
| 18 December 2023 | MF | (Japan) Kosei Shibasaki | | Retired | |
| 22 December 2023 | FW | (Japan) Ryo Tanada | (Japan) Iwaki FC | Loan | |
| 23 December 2023 | MF | (Japan) Kodai Dohi | (Japan) Tochigi SC | Loan | |
| 26 December 2023 | DF | (Japan) Jelani Reshaun Sumiyoshi | (Japan) Shimizu S-Pulse | Loan | |
| 12 January 2024 | FW | (Switzerland) Nassim Ben Khalifa | (Japan) Avispa Fukuoka | Full | |

== Shonan Bellmare ==
=== Arrivals ===
| Date | Position | Player | From | Type | Source |
|---|---|---|---|---|---|
| 13 February 2023 | DF | (Japan) Naoya Takahashi | (Japan) Kansai University | Full | |
| 23 December 2023 | MF | (Japan) Yuto Suzuki | (Japan) Júbilo Iwata | Full | |
| 25 December 2023 | MF | (Japan) Kohei Okuno | (Japan) Gamba Osaka | Full | |
| 27 December 2023 | FW | (Japan) Ryo Nemoto | (Japan) Tochigi SC | Loan return | |
| 30 December 2023 | GK | (Japan) Kota Sanada | (Japan) Veertien Mie | Loan return | |
| 3 January 2024 | DF | (South Korea) Kim Min-tae | (Japan) Kashima Antlers | Full | |
| 9 January 2024 | FW | (Brazil) Lukian | (Japan) Avispa Fukuoka | Full | |
| 2 May 2024 | FW | (Japan) Keigo Watanabe | (Japan) Toin University of Yokohama | DSP | |

=== Departures ===
| Date | Position | Player | To | Type | Source |
|---|---|---|---|---|---|
| 9 December 2023 | FW | (Norway) Tarik Elyounoussi | | Released | |
| 15 December 2023 | GK | (Japan) Kotaro Tachikawa | (Japan) Iwaki FC | Full | |
| 20 December 2023 | FW | (Japan) Yamato Wakatsuki | (Japan) Renofa Yamaguchi | Full | |
| 24 December 2023 | MF | (Japan) Ryota Nagaki | (Japan) Tokushima Vortis | Full | |
| 25 December 2023 | DF | (Japan) Hirokazu Ishihara | (Japan) Urawa Red Diamonds | Full | |
| 27 December 2023 | MF | (Japan) Shuto Yamamoto | | Retired | |
| 29 December 2023 | MF | (Japan) Sosuke Shibata | (Japan) Vanraure Hachinohe | Loan | |
| 29 December 2023 | MF | (Japan) Sho Hiramatsu | (Japan) FC Ryukyu | Full | |
| 3 January 2024 | MF | (Japan) Yoshihiro Nakano | (Japan) Yokohama FC | Loan | |
| 5 January 2024 | DF | (Japan) Taisei Ishii | (Japan) FC Tiamo Hirakata | Loan | |
| 9 January 2024 | FW | (Japan) Yuki Ohashi | (Japan) Sanfrecce Hiroshima | Full | |
| 12 January 2024 | MF | (Japan) Mitsuki Saito | (Japan) Vissel Kobe | Full | |

== Tokyo Verdy ==
=== Arrivals ===
| Date | Position | Player | From | Type | Source |
|---|---|---|---|---|---|
| 23 May 2023 | DF | (Japan) Yuto Yamada | (Japan) Kokushikan University | Full | |
| 22 June 2023 | FW | (Japan) Manato Furukawa | (Japan) Kokushikan University | Full | |
| 19 July 2023 | MF | (Japan) Soma Meshino | (Japan) Kyoto Sangyo University | Full | |
| 18 October 2023 | GK | (Japan) Keisuke Nakamura | (Japan) Shizuoka Gakuen High School | Full | |
| 14 December 2023 | MF | (Japan) Tomoya Miki | (Japan) JEF United Chiba | Full | |
| 21 December 2023 | FW | (Japan) Hiroto Yamami | (Japan) Gamba Osaka | Loan | |
| 22 December 2023 | MF | (Japan) Sota Nagai | (Japan) Iwaki FC | Full | |
| 22 December 2023 | DF | (Japan) Takumi Kawamura | (Japan) Iwaki FC | Full | |
| 22 December 2023 | DF | (Japan) Yutaro Hakamata | (Japan) Omiya Ardija | Full | |
| 26 December 2023 | MF | (Japan) Fuki Yamada | (Japan) Kyoto Sanga | Loan | |
| 28 December 2023 | FW | (Japan) Yudai Kimura | (Japan) Kyoto Sanga | Loan | |
| 6 January 2024 | DF | (Japan) Hijiri Onaga | (Japan) FC Machida Zelvia | Full | |
| 13 January 2024 | MF | (Japan) Yuan Matsuhashi | (Japan) Renofa Yamaguchi | Loan return | |
| 16 February 2024 | MF | (Japan) Yuta Arai | (Japan) Toyo University | DSP | |
| 17 March 2024 | MF | (Portugal) Tiago Alves | | Free agent | |
| 17 May 2024 | MF | (Japan) Issei Kumatoriya | (Japan) Meiji University | DSP | |

=== Departures ===
| Date | Position | Player | To | Type | Source |
|---|---|---|---|---|---|
| 7 December 2023 | DF | (Japan) Yuta Narawa | | Retired | |
| 12 December 2023 | MF | (Japan) Tatsuya Hasegawa | (Japan) Yokohama FC | Loan return | |
| 25 December 2023 | MF | (Japan) Hikaru Nakahara | (Japan) Cerezo Osaka | Loan return | |
| 26 December 2023 | MF | (Japan) Yuji Kitajima | (Japan) Avispa Fukuoka | Loan return | |
| 27 December 2023 | DF | (Japan) Ren Kato | (Japan) Tokyo Verdy | Full | |
| 28 December 2023 | MF | (Japan) Taiga Ishiura | (Japan) Ehime FC | Full | |
| 29 December 2023 | DF | (Japan) Kyota Mochii | (Japan) Azul Claro Numazu | Full | |
| 29 December 2023 | MF | (Japan) Hidemasa Koda | (Japan) Nagoya Grampus | Loan return | |
| 29 December 2023 | MF | (Japan) Ryota Kajikawa | (Japan) Fujieda MYFC | Full | |
| 30 December 2023 | MF | (Japan) Ryo Nishitani | (Japan) FC Gifu | Loan | |
| 5 January 2024 | MF | (Japan) Junki Koike | (Japan) Criacao Shinjuku | Full | |
| 5 January 2024 | GK | (Japan) Toru Takagiwa | (Japan) JEF United Chiba | Full | |
| 5 January 2024 | MF | (Japan) Ryuji Sugimoto | (Japan) Thespa Gunma | Full | |
| 6 January 2024 | FW | (Japan) Kosuke Sagawa | (Japan) Thespa Gunma | Loan | |
| 8 January 2024 | DF | (Japan) Maaya Sako | (Japan) Iwate Grulla Morioka | Loan | |
| 10 January 2024 | MF | (Japan) Daiki Kusunoki | (Japan) Tegevajaro Miyazaki | Loan | |
| 11 January 2024 | GK | (Japan) Masahiro Iida | (Japan) Vanraure Hachinohe | Loan | |
| 11 January 2024 | DF | (Japan) Yu Miyamoto | (Japan) Verspah Oita | Loan | |
| 12 January 2024 | MF | (Japan) Mahiro Ano | (Japan) Tegevajaro Miyazaki | Loan | |
| 17 January 2024 | DF | (Indonesia) Pratama Arhan | (South Korea) Suwon FC | Full | |

== Urawa Reds ==
=== Arrivals ===
| Date | Position | Player | From | Type | Source |
|---|---|---|---|---|---|
| 25 December 2023 | DF | (Japan) Hirokazu Ishihara | (Japan) Shonan Bellmare | Full | |
| 27 December 2023 | DF | (Japan) Yota Sato | (Japan) Gamba Osaka | Full | |
| 27 December 2023 | DF | (Japan) Rikito Inoue | (Japan) Kyoto Sanga | Full | |
| 29 December 2023 | MF | (Japan) Hidetoshi Takeda | (Japan) Mito Hollyhock | Loan return | |
| 29 December 2023 | MF | (Sweden) Samuel Gustafson | (Sweden) BK Häcken | Full | |
| 7 January 2024 | DF | (Japan) Ryoma Watanabe | (Japan) FC Tokyo | Full | |
| 7 January 2024 | FW | (Japan) Naoki Maeda | (Japan) Nagoya Grampus | Full | |
| 9 January 2024 | MF | (Japan) Tomoya Ugajin | (Japan) FC Gifu | Full | |
| 12 January 2024 | MF | (Norway) Ola Solbakken | (Italy) AS Roma | Loan | |
| 13 January 2024 | FW | (Brazil) Thiago Santana | (Japan) Shimizu S-Pulse | Full | |
| 13 January 2024 | MF | (Japan) Yusuke Matsuo | (Belgium) KVC Westerlo | Loan return | |

=== Departures ===
| Date | Position | Player | To | Type | Source |
|---|---|---|---|---|---|
| 27 November 2023 | FW | (Netherlands) Alex Schalk | | Released | |
| 27 November 2023 | FW | (Guinea) José Kanté | | Retired | |
| 8 December 2023 | DF | (Japan) Ryuya Fukushima | | Released | |
| 26 December 2023 | DF | (Japan) Tetsuya Chinen | (Japan) Vegalta Sendai | Full | |
| 26 December 2023 | DF | (Japan) Yuta Miyamoto | (Japan) Kyoto Sanga | Loan | |
| 29 December 2023 | DF | (Japan) Tomoya Inukai | (Japan) Kashiwa Reysol | Full | |
| 4 January 2024 | MF | (Japan) Kai Matsuzaki | (Japan) Shimizu S-Pulse | Full | |
| 5 January 2024 | DF | (Japan) Yudai Fujiwara | (Japan) Oita Trinita | Loan | |
| 7 January 2024 | DF | (Japan) Kazuaki Mawatari | (Japan) Matsumoto Yamaga | Full | |
| 8 January 2024 | DF | (Japan) Kota Kudo | (Japan) Giravanz Kitakyushu | Loan | |
| 9 January 2024 | MF | (Japan) Kai Shibato | (Japan) FC Machida Zelvia | Loan | |
| 9 January 2024 | DF | (Japan) Takuya Iwanami | (Japan) Vissel Kobe | Full | |
| 11 January 2024 | FW | (Denmark) Kasper Junker | (Japan) Nagoya Grampus | Full | |
| 12 January 2024 | MF | (Japan) Yuichi Hirano | (Japan) Cerezo Osaka | Full | |
| 20 January 2024 | MF | (Japan) Takahiro Akimoto | (Belgium) OH Leuven | Loan | |
| 1 February 2024 | GK | (Japan) Zion Suzuki | (Belgium) Sint-Truiden | Full | |
| 25 March 2024 | FW | (Japan) Toshiki Takahashi | (Japan) Yokohama FC | Loan | |
| 7 May 2024 | MF | (Japan) Jumpei Hayakawa | (Japan) Fagiano Okayama | Loan | |
| 18 May 2024 | MF | (Japan) Takahiro Akimoto | (Belgium) OH Leuven | Full | |

== Vissel Kobe ==
=== Arrivals ===
| Date | Position | Player | From | Type | Source |
|---|---|---|---|---|---|
| 31 March 2022 | MF | (Japan) Kakeru Yamauchi | (Japan) University of Tsukuba | Full | |
| 7 December 2023 | GK | (Japan) Shioki Takayama | (Japan) University of Tsukuba | Full | |
| 22 December 2023 | GK | (Japan) Powell Obinna Obi | (Japan) Yokohama F. Marinos | Full | |
| 4 January 2024 | MF | (Japan) Tatsunori Sakurai | (Japan) Tokushima Vortis | Loan return | |
| 5 January 2024 | GK | (Japan) Shota Arai | (Japan) JEF United Chiba | Full | |
| 5 January 2024 | DF | (Japan) Rikuto Hirose | (Japan) Kashima Antlers | Full | |
| 6 January 2024 | FW | (Japan) Taisei Miyashiro | (Japan) Kawasaki Frontale | Full | |
| 8 January 2024 | DF | (Japan) Shogo Terasaka | (Japan) FC Ryukyu | Loan return | |
| 8 January 2024 | MF | (Japan) Yuya Kuwasaki | (Japan) V-Varen Nagasaki | Full | |
| 9 January 2024 | DF | (Japan) Takuya Iwanami | (Japan) Urawa Red Diamonds | Full | |
| 12 January 2024 | MF | (Japan) Mitsuki Saito | (Japan) Shonan Bellmare | Full | |

=== Departures ===
| Date | Position | Player | To | Type | Source |
|---|---|---|---|---|---|
| 14 December 2023 | GK | (Japan) Ryotaro Hironaga | | Released | |
| 27 December 2023 | MF | (Japan) Toya Izumi | (Japan) Omiya Ardija | Loan | |
| 27 December 2023 | DF | (Japan) Leo Osaki | (United Arab Emirates) Emirates Club | Full | |
| 28 December 2023 | MF | (Hungary) Bálint Vécsei | | Released | |
| 4 January 2024 | DF | (Japan) Shohei Takahashi | (Japan) FC Machida Zelvia | Loan return | |
| 5 January 2024 | GK | (Japan) Yuya Tsuboi | (Japan) Júbilo Iwata | Loan | |
| 6 January 2024 | GK | (Brazil) Phelipe Megiolaro | (Japan) Yokohama FC | Full | |
| 6 January 2024 | MF | (Spain) Juan Mata | | Released | |
| 7 January 2024 | FW | (Japan) Shuhei Kawasaki | (Portugal) Portimonense | Loan return | |
| 7 January 2024 | MF | (Japan) Mizuki Arai | (Japan) Yokohama FC | Loan return | |
| 7 January 2024 | DF | (Japan) Yusei Ozaki | (Japan) Ehime FC | Loan | |
| 8 January 2024 | MF | (Japan) Shuto Adachi | (Japan) Iwate Grulla Morioka | Loan | |
| 1 March 2024 | FW | (Brazil) Lincoln | | Contract terminated | |

== Yokohama F. Marinos ==
=== Arrivals ===
| Date | Position | Player | From | Type | Source |
|---|---|---|---|---|---|
| 2 March 2023 | DF | (Japan) Manato Yoshida | (Japan) NIFS Kanoya | Full | |
| 20 December 2023 | GK | (Japan) Riku Terakado | (Japan) Renofa Yamaguchi | Loan return | |
| 26 December 2023 | MF | (Japan) Keita Ueda | (Japan) Tochigi SC | Loan return | |
| 27 December 2023 | DF | (Japan) Ren Kato | (Japan) Tokyo Verdy | Full | |
| 27 December 2023 | DF | (Japan) Taiki Watanabe | (Japan) Albirex Niigata | Full | |
| 28 December 2023 | MF | (Japan) Jun Amano | (South Korea) Jeonbuk Hyundai Motors | Loan return | |
| 4 January 2024 | MF | (Japan) Kazuya Yamamura | (Japan) Kawasaki Frontale | Full | |
| 9 January 2024 | GK | (Japan) William Popp | (Japan) FC Machida Zelvia | Full | |
| 25 January 2024 | FW | (Japan) Kento Shiogai | (Japan) Keio University | DSP | |
| 7 March 2024 | DF | (Japan) Kosei Suwama | (Japan) University of Tsukuba | DSP | |

=== Departures ===
| Date | Position | Player | To | Type | Source |
|---|---|---|---|---|---|
| 22 December 2023 | GK | (Japan) Powell Obinna Obi | (Japan) Vissel Kobe | Full | |
| 26 December 2023 | DF | (Japan) Shunsuke Hirai | (Japan) Reilac Shiga | Full | |
| 27 December 2023 | FW | (Japan) Takumi Tsukui | (Japan) Azul Claro Numazu | Full | |
| 28 December 2023 | MF | (Japan) Takuto Kimura | (Japan) Ventforet Kofu | Loan | |
| 28 December 2023 | GK | (Japan) Jun Ichimori | (Japan) Gamba Osaka | Loan return | |
| 9 January 2024 | FW | (Japan) Kenyu Sugimoto | (Japan) Júbilo Iwata | Loan return | |
| 13 January 2024 | MF | (Japan) Takuto Minami | (Japan) Reilac Shiga | Full | |
| 23 January 2024 | DF | (Japan) Ryotaro Tsunoda | (Wales) Cardiff City | Full | |
| 10 February 2024 | FW | (Japan) Takuma Nishimura | (Switzerland) Servette FC | Loan | |

== See also ==
- List of J1 League football transfers winter 2022–23
- List of J2 League football transfers winter 2023–24
