= Akiyuki =

- Gender: Male

Origin
- Origin: Japanese
- Meaning: Different meanings depending on the kanji used

Akiyuki (written: 昭之, 昭如, 章之 or 晃志) is a masculine Japanese given name. Notable people with the name include:

- Akiyuki Hashimoto (橋元 晃志; born 1994), Japanese sprinter
- Akiyuki Kido (木戸 章之; born 1975), Japanese ice dancer
- Akiyuki Nosaka (野坂 昭如; born 1930), Japanese writer and politician
- Akiyuki Shinbo (新房 昭之; born 1961), Japanese anime director
- Akiyuki Yokoyama (横山 暁之; born 1997), Japanese footballer

== Fictional characters ==
- Akiyuki Takehara (竹原 アキユキ), protagonist of the anime series Xam'd: Lost Memories
