= Atsuki Satsukawa =

Japanese footballer

Personal information
- Full name: Atsuki Satsukawa
- Date of birth: 12 August 1997 (age 29)
- Place of birth: Shizuoka, Japan
- Height: 1.68 m (5 ft 6 in)
- Position: Defender

Team information
- Current team: Kagoshima United FC (on loan from Oita Trinita)
- Number: 6

Youth career
- FC Shibakawa
- –2012: Liberdade FC
- 2013–2015: Shizuoka Gakuen High School

College career
Years	Team	Apps	(Gls)
2016–2019	Kanto Gakuin University		

Senior career*
Years	Team	Apps	(Gls)
2020–2022	Kamatamare Sanuki	39	(2)
2022–2023	Kagoshima United FC	44	(5)
2024–	Oita Trinita	30	(1)
2026	→ Tochigi City FC (loan)	2	(0)
2026–	→ Kagoshima United FC (loan)	0	(0)
- * Club domestic league appearances and goals as of 18 August 2026

Atsuki Satsukawa (薩川 淳貴, Satsukawa Atsuki; born 12 August 1997) is a Japanese footballer currently playing as a defender for Kagoshima United FC, on loan from Oita Trinita.

== Career ==
Satsukawa made his debut for Kamatamare against Gamba Osaka U-23 on 28 June 2020, playing the full 90 minutes.

== Career statistics ==
=== Club ===
As of 13 November 2020.

Club	Season	League			National Cup		League Cup		Other		Total	
Club	Season	Division	Apps	Goals	Apps	Goals	Apps	Goals	Apps	Goals	Apps	Goals
Kamatamare Sanuki	2020	J3 League	8	0	0	0	–		0	0	8	0
Career total			8	0	0	0	0	0	0	0	8	0
