= Kenta Fukumori =

Japanese footballer

Personal information
- Full name: Kenta Fukumori
- Date of birth: July 4, 1994 (age 32)
- Place of birth: Edogawa, Tokyo, Japan
- Height: 1.68 m (5 ft 6 in)
- Position: Defender

Team information
- Current team: Giravanz Kitakyushu
- Number: 30

Youth career
- –2006: Seishin Daisan SC
- 2007–2012: FC Tokyo

College career
Years	Team	Apps	(Gls)
2013–2016	NIFS Kanoya		

Senior career*
Years	Team	Apps	(Gls)
2016–2021	Giravanz Kitakyushu	66	(1)
2021–2023	Oita Trinita	9	(0)
2021	→ Giravanz Kitakyushu (loan)	18	(1)
2022–2023	→ Tochigi SC (loan)	68	(2)
2024–2025	Tochigi SC	35	(3)
2026–	Giravanz Kitakyushu	19	(0)
- * Club domestic league appearances and goals as of 24 August 2026

Kenta Fukumori (福森 健太, Fukumori Kenta; born July 4, 1994) is a Japanese football player who currently plays for Giravanz Kitakyushu.

== Career ==
Kenta Fukumori joined J2 League club Giravanz Kitakyushu in 2016.

== Career statistics ==
Updated to 22 February 2018.

Appearances and goals by club, season and competition
Club	Season	League			Emperor's Cup		Total	
Club	Season	Division	Apps	Goals	Apps	Goals	Apps	Goals
Giravanz Kitakyushu	2016	J2 League	2	0	0	0	2	0
Giravanz Kitakyushu	2017	J3 League	27	0	2	0	29	0
Career total			29	0	2	0	31	0
