= Shunsuke Yamamoto =

Japanese footballer

Personal information
- Date of birth: 24 March 1999 (age 27)
- Place of birth: Hagi, Yamaguchi, Japan
- Height: 1.82 m (6 ft 0 in)
- Position: Forward

Team information
- Current team: Renofa Yamaguchi FC
- Number: 19

Youth career
- 2014–2016: Takagawa Gakuen High School

College career
Years	Team	Apps	(Gls)
2017–2020	Tokuyama University		

Senior career*
Years	Team	Apps	(Gls)
2021–2024	Kagoshima United	72	(9)
2024-	Renofa Yamaguchi	75	(8)
2025	→ Nara Club (loan)	11	(1)
- * Club domestic league appearances and goals as of 21 August 2026

Shunsuke Yamamoto (山本 駿亮, Yamamoto Shunsuke; born 24 March 1999) is a Japanese footballer currently playing as a forward for Renofa Yamaguchi FC.

== Career statistics ==
=== Club ===
As of 26 April 2021.

Club	Season	League			National Cup		League Cup		Other		Total	
Club	Season	Division	Apps	Goals	Apps	Goals	Apps	Goals	Apps	Goals	Apps	Goals
Kagoshima United	2021	J3 League	1	0	0	0	–		0	0	1	0
Career total			1	0	0	0	0	0	0	0	1	0
