= Yuto Hikida =

Japanese footballer (born 1998)

Personal information
- Full name: Yuto Hikida
- Date of birth: 7 April 1998 (age 28)
- Place of birth: Yamaguchi, Japan
- Height: 1.75 m (5 ft 9 in)
- Position: Midfielder

Youth career
- FC Moewe
- 2014–2016: Hiroshima Minami High School

College career
| Years | Team | Apps | (Gls) |
| 2017–2020 | Osaka University H&SS | | |

Senior career*
| Years | Team | Apps | (Gls) |
| 2021–2023 | Fagiano Okayama | 15 | (2) |
| 2023-2024 | → Ehime (loan) | 18 | (1) |
| 2024 | Boeung Ket | 12 | (0) |
- * Club domestic league appearances and goals as of 06:32, 23 January 2024 (UTC)

Yuto Hikida (疋田 優人, Hikida Yuto; born 7 April 1998) is a Japanese footballer currently playing as a midfielder.

== Career ==
Yuto scored on his league debut for Fagiano against Ehime on the 11 April 2021, scoring in the 90th+7th minute.

Yuto made his league debut for Ehime against Gifu on the 8 April 2023. Yuto scored his first goal for the club against Kataller Toyama on the 9 July 2023, scoring in the 50th minute.

== Career statistics ==
=== Club ===
As of 13 July 2021.

| Club | Season | League | | | National Cup | | League Cup | | Other | | Total | |
| Club | Season | Division | Apps | Goals | Apps | Goals | Apps | Goals | Apps | Goals | Apps | Goals |
|---|---|---|---|---|---|---|---|---|---|---|---|---|
| Fagiano Okayama | 2021 | J2 League | 10 | 2 | 1 (Note: Appearances in the Emperor's Cup) | 0 | 0 | 0 | 0 | 0 | 11 | 2 |
| Career total | | | 10 | 2 | 0 | 0 | 0 | 0 | 0 | 0 | 11 | 2 |

== Honours ==
Ehime

- J3 League: 2023
