= Matheus Moraes =

Brazilian footballer

Personal information
- Full name: Matheus Purcelo Blecha de Moraes
- Date of birth: 22 April 2000 (age 26)
- Place of birth: Mogi Mirim, Brazil
- Height: 1.76 m (5 ft 9 in)
- Position: Forward

Team information
- Current team: Albirex Niigata
- Number: 55

Youth career
- 2010–2021: Santos

Senior career*
Years	Team	Apps	(Gls)
2021–2022	Santos	0	(0)
2021	→ Maringá (loan)	9	(2)
2022	→ Maringá (loan)	0	(0)
2022	Londrina	0	(0)
2023–2025	Maringá	66	(16)
2025–	Albirex Niigata	25	(8)
- * Club domestic league appearances and goals as of 16 August 2026

Matheus Purcelo Blecha de Moraes (born 22 April 2000), known as Matheus Moraes or simply Moraes, is a Brazilian footballer for Japanese J2 League club Albirex Niigata. Mainly a forward, he can also play as an attacking midfielder.

== Club career ==
Born in Mogi Mirim, São Paulo, Moraes joined Santos' youth setup in 2011, aged ten. On 31 July 2017, he signed his first professional contract with the club, agreeing to a three-year deal.

Struggling severely with injuries, Moraes could not feature regularly for the youth sides, but still renewed his contract until 2022 on 24 January 2020. On 21 July, he was registered for the year's Campeonato Paulista.

On 5 February 2021, Moraes was loaned to Maringá for the 2021 Campeonato Paranaense. He made his professional debut on 23 March, coming on as a 65th-minute substitute for Vinícius Faria but being subbed off nine minutes later due to an injury in a 0–1 home loss against Coritiba.

Moraes scored his first senior goals on 15 May 2021, netting a brace in a 9–1 away success over Cascavel CR. He returned to Santos after his loan ended, playing for the under-23s, before rejoining Maringá also on loan on 6 January 2022. However, he was unable to play after suffering a fracture on his fibula shortly after.

On 1 July 2022, Moraes left Santos as his contract expired, and joined Londrina on 8 August. On 30 November, after only two unused substitute appearances, he returned to Maringá on a permanent deal.

After being mainly a backup option, Moraes became an undisputed starter in the 2025 season, scoring eight goals as the club reached the finals of the 2025 Campeonato Paranaense.

== Career statistics ==
As of 31 March 2025

Club	Season	League			State League		Cup		Continental		Other		Total	
Club	Season	Division	Apps	Goals	Apps	Goals	Apps	Goals	Apps	Goals	Apps	Goals	Apps	Goals
Santos	2021	Série A	0	0	—		0	0	—		2 (Note: Appearance(s) in Copa Paulista)	0	2	0
Maringá (loan)	2021	Paranaense	—		9	2	—		—		—		9	2
Maringá (loan)	2022	Paranaense	—		0	0	—		—		—		0	0
Londrina	2022	Série B	0	0	—		—		—		—		0	0
Maringá	2023	Série D	3	0	12	3	2	0	—		—		17	3
Maringá	2024	Série D	18	3	8	0	1	0	—		—		27	3
Maringá	2025	Série C	0	0	16	8	2	1	—		—		18	9
Maringá	Total		21	3	36	11	5	1	—		—		62	15
Career total			21	3	45	13	5	1	0	0	2	0	73	17
