= Tomoya Wakahara =

Japanese association football player

Tomoya Wakahara 若原 智哉
Personal information
- Full name: Tomoya Wakahara
- Date of birth: December 28, 1999 (age 26)
- Place of birth: Kusatsu, Shiga, Japan
- Height: 1.85 m (6 ft 1 in)
- Position: Goalkeeper

Team information
- Current team: Kashiwa Reysol
- Number: 77

Youth career
- Yagura FC
- Kyoto Sanga FC

Senior career*
Years	Team	Apps	(Gls)
2018–2024	Kyoto Sanga FC	95	(0)
2024	V-Varen Nagasaki	17	(0)
2025–2026	JEF United Chiba	19	(0)
2026–	Kashiwa Reysol	0	(0)

International career
2015–2017	Japan U18	6	(0)
2018	Japan U19	1	(0)
2019	Japan U20	4	(0)
Medal record
Representing Japan
AFC U-19 Championship
Gold medal – first place	2016
Bronze medal – third place	2018
- * Club domestic league appearances and goals as of 10 August 2026

Tomoya Wakahara (若原 智哉, Wakahara Tomoya; born 28 December 1999) is a Japanese footballer who plays for Kashiwa Reysol.

== Career ==
After being raised by Kyoto Sanga youth ranks, Wakahara was promoted to the top team in November 2017.

== Career statistics ==
Updated to 20 July 2022.

Appearances and goals by club, season and competition
Club	Season	League			Emperor's Cup		J.League Cup		Total	
Club	Season	Division	Apps	Goals	Apps	Goals	Apps	Goals	Apps	Goals
Kyoto Sanga	2018	J2 League	12	0	0	0	—		12	0
Kyoto Sanga	2019	J2 League	1	0	0	0	—		1	0
Kyoto Sanga	2020	J2 League	27	0	—		—		27	0
Kyoto Sanga	2021	J2 League	33	0	0	0	—		33	0
Kyoto Sanga	2022	J1 League	4	0	0	0	3	0	7	0
Career total			77	0	0	0	3	0	80	0
