= Shunsuke Nishikubo =

Japanese footballer

Shunsuke Nishikubo 西久保 駿介
Personal information
- Date of birth: 30 July 2003 (age 23)
- Place of birth: Kawaguchi, Saitama, Japan
- Height: 1.78 m (5 ft 10 in)
- Position: Right-back

Team information
- Current team: Júbilo Iwata
- Number: 26

Youth career
- –2015: Kawaguchi Asahi Revolver SSS
- 2016–2021: Mitsubishi Yowa

Senior career*
Years	Team	Apps	(Gls)
2022–2023	JEF United Chiba	39	(2)
2024–	Júbilo Iwata	33	(1)
2025	SC Sagamihara (loan)	20	(2)
- * Club domestic league appearances and goals as of 14 August 2026

Shunsuke Nishikubo (西久保 駿介, Nishikubo Shunsuke; born 30 July 2003) is a Japanese footballer who plays as a right-back for J2 League club Júbilo Iwata.

== Career ==
In August 2021, it was announced that Nishikubo, aged 18, would be joining J2 League club JEF United Chiba for the 2022 season. He made his debut in a 2–1 league victory over FC Ryukyu in February 2022. He scored his first goal for the club later in the season in a 2–1 win over eventual league champions Albirex Niigata. He made 28 appearances in his debut season in all competitions.

In spite of his debut season, Nishikubo made only 12 appearances in the 2023 season.

In January 2024, it was announced Nishikubo would be transferring to J1 League club Júbilo Iwata ahead of the 2024 season.

== Career statistics ==
=== Club ===
As of 7 April 2024

Appearances and goals by club, season and competition
Club	Season	League			National Cup		League Cup		Total	
Club	Season	Division	Apps	Goals	Apps	Goals	Apps	Goals	Apps	Goals
Japan			League		Emperor's Cup		J. League Cup		Total	
JEF United Chiba	2023	J2 League	27	1	1	0	–		28	1
JEF United Chiba	2023	J2 League	12	1	0	0	–		12	1
JEF United Chiba	Total		39	2	1	0	1	0	40	2
Júbilo Iwata	2024	J1 League	4	1	0	0	0	0	4	1
Career total			43	3	1	0	0	0	44	3
