= Daisuke Yoshimitsu =

Japanese footballer (born 1993)

Daisuke Yoshimitsu 吉満 大介
Personal information
- Full name: Daisuke Yoshimitsu
- Date of birth: 21 February 1993 (age 33)
- Place of birth: Kagoshima, Japan
- Height: 1.87 m (6 ft 2 in)
- Position: Goalkeeper

Team information
- Current team: Albirex Niigata
- Number: 23

Youth career
- 2008–2010: Kamimura Gakuen High School

College career
Years	Team	Apps	(Gls)
2011–2014	NIFS Kanoya		

Senior career*
Years	Team	Apps	(Gls)
2015–2016	Tochigi SC	31	(0)
2017–2023	Renofa Yamaguchi	88	(0)
2024–	Albirex Niigata	10	(0)
- * Club domestic league appearances and goals as of 16 August 2026

Daisuke Yoshimitsu (吉満 大介, Yoshimitsu, Daisuke; born 21 February 1993 in Kagoshima) is a Japanese footballer who plays as a goalkeeper for J2 League club Albirex Niigata.

== Career ==
On 21 December 2016, Yoshimitsu was announced at Renofa Yamaguchi. On 28 December 2017, it was announced that he had had surgery for an injury and would recover in 4 months. The same day, it was also announced that Renofa Yamaguchi had extended his contract for the 2018 season. On 12 December 2023, it was announced that Yoshimitsu's contract would not be renewed for the 2024 season.

On 26 December 2023, Yoshimitsu was announced at Albirex Niigata.

== Personal life ==
Yoshimitsu got married on 28 December 2017.

== Club statistics ==
As of 3 December 2023.

Appearances and goals by club, season and competition
Club	Season	League			National Cup		League Cup		Other		Total	
Club	Season	Division	Apps	Goals	Apps	Goals	Apps	Goals	Apps	Goals	Apps	Goals
Japan			League		Emperor's Cup		J. League Cup		Other		Total	
Tochigi SC	2015	J2 League	1	0	0	0	–		–		1	0
Tochigi SC	2016	J3 League	30	0	0	0	–		2 (Note: Appearances in J2/J3 promotion play-offs)	0	32	0
Tochigi SC	Total		31	0	0	0	0	0	2	0	33	0
Renofa Yamaguchi	2017	J2 League	8	0	0	0	–		–		8	0
Renofa Yamaguchi	2018	J2 League	17	0	0	0	–		–		17	0
Renofa Yamaguchi	2019	J2 League	28	0	0	0	–		–		28	0
Renofa Yamaguchi	2020	J2 League	20	0	0	0	–		–		20	0
Renofa Yamaguchi	2021	J2 League	7	0	1	0	–		–		8	0
Renofa Yamaguchi	2022	J2 League	0	0	0	0	–		–		0	0
Renofa Yamaguchi	2023	J2 League	8	0	0	0	–		–		8	0
Renofa Yamaguchi	Total		88	0	1	0	0	0	0	0	89	0
Albirex Niigata	2024	J1 League	0	0	0	0	0	0	–		0	0
Career total			119	0	1	0	0	0	2	0	122	24
