= Katsunori Ueebisu =

Japanese professional footballer

Personal information
- Date of birth: 5 April 1996 (age 30)
- Place of birth: Ichikikushikino, Kagoshima, Japan
- Height: 1.81 m (5 ft 11 in)
- Position: Defender

Team information
- Current team: Júbilo Iwata
- Number: 22

Youth career
- 2003–2008: Kushikino FC
- 2009–2011: Kagoshima Ikueikan Junior HS
- 2012–2014: Kagoshima Josei High School

College career
Years	Team	Apps	(Gls)
2015–2018	Meiji University		

Senior career*
Years	Team	Apps	(Gls)
2019–2020	Kyoto Sanga	28	(0)
2021–2023	Oita Trinita	32	(1)
2024	Sagan Tosu	20	(0)
2025–	Júbilo Iwata	17	(0)
- * Club domestic league appearances and goals as of 14 August 2026

Katsunori Ueebisu (上夷 克典, Ueebisu Katsunori; born 5 April 1996) is a Japanese professional footballer who plays as a defender for Júbilo Iwata.

== Early life and education ==
Ueebisu was born in Ichikikushikino, Kagoshima Prefecture. He began playing football in local youth teams before attending Kagoshima Josei High School. During his high school years, he played as a central defender and took part in national high school competitions.

He continued his development at Meiji University, where he became a regular member of the team and attracted interest from professional clubs prior to graduation.

== Club career ==
=== Kyoto Sanga ===
Ueebisu joined Kyoto Sanga FC ahead of the 2019 season after graduating from Meiji University. He made his professional debut in the J2 League in 2019 and made 28 league appearances for the club over two seasons.

=== Oita Trinita ===
In 2021, Ueebisu transferred to Oita Trinita. He played in the J1 League during his first season with the club and remained with Oita following their relegation to J2. Over three seasons, he became a regular member of the defence and scored his first professional goal in July 2023.

=== Sagan Tosu ===
Ueebisu joined Sagan Tosu for the 2024 season. He made 20 league appearances for the club during the season.

=== Júbilo Iwata ===
On 5 January 2025, Ueebisu was announced as a new signing for Júbilo Iwata. He made his first start for the club in March 2025 in a league match against Ventforet Kofu.

== Style of play ==
Ueebisu plays primarily as a central defender. He has been described in Japanese football media as a player with pace, positional awareness and the ability to distribute the ball from defence.
