= Eiji Shirai =

Japanese footballer (born 1995)

Eiji Shirai 白井 永地
Personal information
- Full name: Eiji Shirai
- Date of birth: 26 May 1995 (age 31)
- Place of birth: Chiba, Chiba, Japan
- Height: 1.76 m (5 ft 9 in)
- Position: Midfielder

Team information
- Current team: Albirex Niigata
- Number: 8

Youth career
- Mimomi Marine Stars
- 2008–2013: Kashiwa Reysol

Senior career*
| Years | Team | Apps | (Gls) |
| 2014–2019 | Mito HollyHock | 126 | (8) |
| 2014–2015 | → J.League U-22 (loan) | 15 | (1) |
| 2020–2022 | Fagiano Okayama | 76 | (5) |
| 2022–2023 | Tokushima Vortis | 84 | (5) |
| 2024–2025 | Kashiwa Reysol | 43 | (1) |
| 2025– | Albirex Niigata | 36 | (2) |
- * Club domestic league appearances and goals as of 16 August 2026

Eiji Shirai (白井 永地, Shirai Eiji; born 26 May 1995 in Chiba, Chiba) is a Japanese footballer who plays for Albirex Niigata.

== Club statistics ==
Updated to 22 February 2020.

| Club performance | | | League | | Cup | | Total | |
| Season | Club | League | Apps | Goals | Apps | Goals | Apps | Goals |
| Japan | | | League | | Emperor's Cup | | Total | |
|---|---|---|---|---|---|---|---|---|
| 2014 | Mito HollyHock | J2 League | 1 | 0 | 0 | 0 | 1 | 0 |
| 2015 | Mito HollyHock | J2 League | 3 | 0 | 3 | 0 | 6 | 0 |
| 2016 | Mito HollyHock | J2 League | 30 | 5 | 0 | 0 | 30 | 5 |
| 2017 | Mito HollyHock | J2 League | 36 | 1 | 1 | 0 | 37 | 1 |
| 2018 | Mito HollyHock | J2 League | 16 | 0 | 2 | 0 | 18 | 0 |
| 2019 | Mito HollyHock | J2 League | 40 | 2 | 1 | 0 | 41 | 2 |
| Career total | | | 126 | 8 | 7 | 0 | 133 | 8 |
