= Wataru Iwashita =

Japanese footballer

Personal information
- Full name: Wataru Iwashita
- Date of birth: 1 April 1999 (age 27)
- Place of birth: Kumamoto, Kumamoto, Japan
- Height: 1.77 m (5 ft 10 in)
- Position: Full back

Team information
- Current team: Roasso Kumamoto
- Number: 6

Youth career
- FCK Marry Gold Kumamoto
- –2013: JFA Academy Kumamoto Uki
- 2014–2016: Maebashi Ikuei High School

College career
Years	Team	Apps	(Gls)
2017–2020	Toin University of Yokohama		

Senior career*
Years	Team	Apps	(Gls)
2021	Roasso Kumamoto	25	(3)
2022–2024	Kashiwa Reysol	5	(0)
2024	→ Roasso Kumamoto (loan)	36	(3)
2025–	Roasso Kumamoto	35	(2)
- * Club domestic league appearances and goals as of 1 January 2026

Wataru Iwashita (岩下 航, Iwashita Wataru; born 1 April 1999) is a Japanese footballer currently playing as a full back for Roasso Kumamoto.

== Club career ==
Iwashita was confirmed to have joined J1 League side Kashiwa Reysol ahead of the 2022 season.

== Career statistics ==
=== Club ===
As of 2 April 2022.

Club	Season	League			National Cup		League Cup		Other		Total	
Club	Season	Division	Apps	Goals	Apps	Goals	Apps	Goals	Apps	Goals	Apps	Goals
Toin University of Yokohama	2019	–			2 (Note: Appearances in the Emperor's Cup)	1	–		0	0	2	1
Toin University of Yokohama	2020	–			2	0	–		0	0	2	0
Toin University of Yokohama	Total		0	0	4	1	0	0	0	0	4	1
Roasso Kumamoto	2021	J3 League	25	3	2	1	–		0	0	27	4
Kashiwa Reysol	2022	J1 League	1	0	0	0	3 (Note: Appearances in the J.League Cup)	0	0	0	4	0
Career total			26	3	6	2	3	0	0	0	35	5
