= Akiyuki Yokoyama =

Japanese footballer

Akiyuki Yokoyama 横山 暁之
Personal information
- Date of birth: 26 March 1997 (age 29)
- Place of birth: Tokyo, Japan
- Height: 1.71 m (5 ft 7 in)
- Position: Midfielder

Team information
- Current team: Yokohama FC
- Number: 26

Youth career
- Yamasaki FC
- –2014: Tokyo Verdy

College career
Years	Team	Apps	(Gls)
2015–2018	Hokuriku University		

Senior career*
Years	Team	Apps	(Gls)
2020–2022	Fujieda MYFC	77	(19)
2023–2025	JEF United Chiba	63	(8)
2026–	Yokohama FC	15	(5)
- * Club domestic league appearances and goals as of 14 August 2026

Akiyuki Yokoyama (横山 暁之, Yokoyama Akiyuki; born 26 March 1997) is a Japanese footballer currently playing as a midfielder for J2 League club Yokohama FC.

== Career ==
In December 2025, it was announced Yokoyama would be joining J2 League club Yokohama FC ahead of the 2026 season.

== Career statistics ==
=== Club ===
As of 18 February 2026

Appearances and goals by club, season and competition
Club	Season	League			National Cup		League Cup		Other		Total	
Club	Season	Division	Apps	Goals	Apps	Goals	Apps	Goals	Apps	Goals	Apps	Goals
Japan			League		Emperor's Cup		J. League Cup		Other		Total	
Hokuriku University	2015	–			1	0	–		–		1	0
Hokuriku University	2016	–			1	0	–		–		1	0
Hokuriku University	2017	–			1	0	–		–		1	0
Hokuriku University	Total		0	0	3	0	0	0	0	0	3	0
Fujieda MYFC	2021	J3 League	6	0	0	0	–		–		6	0
Fujieda MYFC	2022	J3 League	31	13	1	0	–		–		32	13
Fujieda MYFC	2023	J2 League	40	6	0	0	–		–		40	6
Fujieda MYFC	Total		77	19	1	0	0	0	0	0	78	19
JEF United Chiba	2024	J2 League	33	5	2	0	–		–		35	5
JEF United Chiba	2025	J2 League	30	3	1	0	0	0	–		31	3
JEF United Chiba	Total		63	8	3	0	0	0	0	0	66	8
Yokohama FC	2026	J2/J3 (100)	1	0	0	0	0	0	–		1	0
Career total			141	27	7	0	0	0	0	0	148	27
