= Naoto Misawa =

Japanese footballer (born 1995)

Naoto Misawa 三沢 直人
Personal information
- Full name: Naoto Misawa
- Date of birth: July 7, 1995 (age 31)
- Place of birth: Iwate, Japan]
- Height: 1.80 m (5 ft 11 in)
- Position: Midfielder

Team information
- Current team: Renofa Yamaguchi FC
- Number: 7

Youth career
- 2002–2007: Chiyoda FC
- 2008–2010: Kamui JY
- 2011–2013: Seibudai High School

College career
Years	Team	Apps	(Gls)
2014–2017	Senshu University		

Senior career*
Years	Team	Apps	(Gls)
2018	YSCC Yokohama	25	(7)
2019–2020	Gainare Tottori	61	(14)
2021–2023	Kyoto Sanga FC	46	(4)
2024	Ventforet Kofu	18	(0)
2025–	Renofa Yamaguchi FC	45	(1)
- * Club domestic league appearances and goals as of 21 August 2026

Naoto Misawa (三沢 直人, Misawa Naoto; born July 7, 1995) is a Japanese football player for Renofa Yamaguchi FC.

== Career ==
After attending at Senshu University, Misawa joined YSCC Yokohama.

== Club statistics ==
Updated to 2 January 2021.

Club performance			League		Cup		Total	
Season	Club	League	Apps	Goals	Apps	Goals	Apps	Goals
Japan			League		Cup		Total	
2018	YSCC Yokohama	J3 League	25	7	2	0	27	7
2019	Gainare Tottori	J3 League	27	7	1	0	28	7
2020	Gainare Tottori	J3 League	34	7	-		34	7
Total			86	21	3	0	89	21
