= Yuan Matsuhashi =

Japanese footballer

Personal information
- Date of birth: 27 October 2001 (age 25)
- Place of birth: Atsugi, Kanagawa, Japan
- Height: 1.72 m (5 ft 8 in)
- Position: Midfielder

Team information
- Current team: Tokyo Verdy
- Number: 7

Youth career
- Tobio JSC
- –2020: Tokyo Verdy

Senior career*
Years	Team	Apps	(Gls)
2020–	Tokyo Verdy	84	(1)
2021	→ SC Sagamihara (loan)	17	(2)
2022	→ SC Sagamihara (loan)	20	(4)
2023	→ Renofa Yamaguchi (loan)	8	(0)

International career^{‡}
2018	Japan U17	7	(0)
2019	Japan U18	6	(2)
- * Club domestic league appearances and goals as of 13 September 2025 ‡ National team caps and goals as of 17:04, 13 November 2020 (UTC)

Yuan Matsuhashi (松橋 優安, Matsuhashi Yuan; born 27 October 2001) is a Japanese footballer currently playing as a midfielder for Tokyo Verdy.

== Career statistics ==
=== Club ===
As of 10 November 2020.

Club	Season	League			National Cup		League Cup		Other		Total	
Club	Season	Division	Apps	Goals	Apps	Goals	Apps	Goals	Apps	Goals	Apps	Goals
Tokyo Verdy	2020	J2 League	12	0	0	0	0	0	0	0	12	0
Career total			12	0	0	0	0	0	0	0	12	0
