= 2023 Zweigen Kanazawa season =

Zweigen Kanazawa
2023 season
- Chairman: Hiroshi Yonezawa
- Manager: Masaaki Yanagishita
- Stadium: Ishikawa Athletics Stadium
- J2 League: 14th
- Emperor's Cup: Second round
- All statistics correct as of 13 May 2023.

The 2023 season was Zweigen Kanazawa's 67th season in existence and the club's ninth consecutive season in the second division of Japanese football. In addition to the domestic league, Zweigen Kanazawa participated in this season's edition of the Emperor's Cup.

== Players ==
=== First-team squad ===
As of 22 February 2023. Note: Flags indicate national team as defined under FIFA eligibility rules; some limited exceptions apply. Players may hold more than one non-FIFA nationality.

No.	Pos.	Nation	Player
1	GK	JPN	Yuto Shirai
2	DF	JPN	Yuto Nagamine
3	DF	JPN	Kengo Kuroki
4	DF	JPN	Ryota Inoue
5	DF	JPN	Fuga Sakurai
7	MF	JPN	Junya Kato
8	MF	JPN	Keita Fujimura
9	FW	JPN	Masamichi Hayashi
10	MF	JPN	Shintaro Shimada
11	FW	JPN	Kyohei Sugiura
13	MF	JPN	Ryuhei Oishi
14	MF	JPN	Takayoshi Ishihara
15	FW	JPN	Koya Okuda (on loan from V-Varen Nagasaki)
16	DF	JPN	Shunya Mori

No.	Pos.	Nation	Player
17	MF	JPN	Yuki Kajiura (on loan from FC Tokyo)
18	MF	JPN	Kazuya Onohara
19	FW	JPN	Yohei Toyoda
21	GK	JPN	Kojiro Nakano (on loan from Consadole Sapporo)
22	MF	JPN	Shogo Rikiyasu
23	DF	KOR	Park Jun-seo (on loan from Daejeon Hana Citizen)
25	DF	JPN	Masaya Kojima
27	DF	BRA	Léo Bahia
30	FW	JPN	Hayato Otani
34	DF	JPN	Rai Namimoto
35	DF	KOR	Taiga Son (on loan from Sagan Tosu)
36	GK	JPN	Motoaki Miura
39	DF	JPN	Honoya Shoji
95	FW	BRA	Jefferson Baiano

=== Out on loan ===
Note: Flags indicate national team as defined under FIFA eligibility rules; some limited exceptions apply. Players may hold more than one non-FIFA nationality.

No.	Pos.	Nation	Player
—	GK	JPN	Itsuki Ueda (at Kochi United)
—	DF	JPN	Gaku Inaba (at ReinMeer Aomori)

No.	Pos.	Nation	Player
—	FW	JPN	Shion Niwa (at Blaublitz Akita)

== Transfers ==
Transfers in
Join on	Pos.	Player	Moving from	Transfer type
Pre-season	GK	(Japan) Kojiro Nakano	(Japan) Consadole Sapporo	Loan transfer
Pre-season	DF	(Brazil) Léo Bahia	(Portugal) UD Vilafranquense	Free transfer
Pre-season	DF	(Japan) Masaya Kojima	(Japan) Thespakusatsu Gunma	Full transfer
Pre-season	DF	(Japan) Ryota Inoue	(Japan) Rissho University	Free transfer
Pre-season	DF	(Japan) Fuga Sakurai	(Japan) Meiji University	Free transfer
Pre-season	DF	(South Korea) Park Jun-seo	(South Korea) Daejeon Hana Citizen	Loan transfer
Pre-season	MF	(Brazil) Jefferson Baiano	(Brazil) Arraial do Cabo	Full transfer
Pre-season	MF	(Japan) Junya Kato	(Japan) Thespakusatsu Gunma	Full transfer
Pre-season	MF	(Japan) Takayoshi Ishihara	(Japan) Vegalta Sendai	Full transfer
Pre-season	MF	(Japan) Yuki Kajiura	(Japan) FC Tokyo	Loan transfer
Pre-season	FW	(Japan) Koya Okuda	(Japan) V-Varen Nagasaki	Loan transfer

Transfers out
Leave on	Pos.	Player	Moving to	Transfer type
22 Feb	GK	(Japan) Itsuki Ueda	(Japan) Kochi United	Loan transfer
Pre-season	GK	(Japan) Ryo Ishii	(Japan) Wyvern FC	Free transfer
Pre-season	DF	(Japan) Riku Matsuda	(Japan) JEF United Chiba	Full transfer
Pre-season	DF	(Japan) Takayuki Takayasu	(Japan) FC Ryukyu	Free transfer
Pre-season	DF	(Japan) Yosuke Toji	(Japan) ReinMeer Aomori	Free transfer
Pre-season	DF	(Japan) Seiya Katakura	(Japan) Aventura Kawaguchi	Free transfer
Pre-season	DF	(Japan) Gaku Inaba	(Japan) ReinMeer Aomori	Loan transfer
Pre-season	DF	(Japan) Daisuke Matsumoto	(Japan) Sagan Tosu	Loan expiration
Pre-season	DF	(Japan) Tomonobu Hiroi	–	Retirement
Pre-season	MF	(Japan) Hiroya Matsumoto	(Japan) Sanfrecce Hiroshima	Loan expiration
Pre-season	MF	(Japan) Megumu Nishida	(Japan) Nara Club	Free transfer
Pre-season	MF	(Japan) Raisei Shimazu	(Japan) Tiamo Hirakata	Free transfer
Pre-season	MF	(Japan) Ryo Kubota	(Japan) FC Gifu	Free transfer
Pre-season	MF	(Japan) Dai Tsukamoto	(Japan) Gamba Osaka	Loan expiration
Pre-season	MF	(Japan) Naoki Suto	(Japan) Kashima Antlers	Loan expiration
Pre-season	MF	(Japan) Sho Hiramatsu	(Japan) Shonan Bellmare	Loan expiration
Pre-season	FW	(Japan) Rikito Sugiura	(Japan) Tegevajaro Miyazaki	Full transfer
Pre-season	FW	(Japan) Shion Niwa	(Japan) Blaublitz Akita	Loan transfer

== Competitions ==
=== Overview ===
Competition	First match	Last match	Starting round	Record							
Competition	First match	Last match	Starting round	Pld	W	D	L	GF	GA	GD	Win %
J2 League	19 February 2023	12 November 2023	Matchday 1	17	6	1	10	23	29	−6	35.29
Emperor's Cup	7 June 2023		Second round	0	0	0	0	0	0	+0	—
Total				17	6	1	10	23	29	−6	35.29

Last updated: 21 May 2023
Source: Soccerway

=== J2 League ===
==== League table ====
Pos	Team	Pld	W	D	L	GF	GA	GD	Pts	Promotion or relegation
18	Iwaki FC	42	12	11	19	45	69	−24	47	
19	Tochigi SC	42	10	14	18	39	47	−8	44	
20	Renofa Yamaguchi	42	10	14	18	37	67	−30	44	
21	Omiya Ardija (R)	42	11	6	25	37	71	−34	39	Relegation to J3 League
22	Zweigen Kanazawa (R)	42	9	8	25	41	70	−29	35	Relegation to J3 League

Source: Meiji Yasuda J2 League, J.League Data Site
Rules for classification: 1) Points; 2) Goal difference; 3) Goals scored; 4) Head-to-head points; 5) Head-to-head goal difference; 6) Head-to-head goal scored; 7) Fair-play points.
(R) Relegated

==== Results summary ====
Overall								Home						Away					
Pld	W	D	L	GF	GA	GD	Pts	W	D	L	GF	GA	GD	W	D	L	GF	GA	GD
15	6	1	8	23	26	−3	19	4	1	2	15	7	+8	2	0	6	8	19	−11

Last updated: 13 May 2023.
Source: Worldfootball

==== Results by round ====
Round	1	2	3	4	5	6	7	8	9	10	11	12	13	14	15	16
Ground	A	A	H	A	H	A	H	A	H	A	H	H	A	A	H	A
Result	L	L	L	L	W	W	W	L	W	W	L	D	L	L	W	
Position	20	21	22	22	21	16	11	15	13	9	11	9	11	14	14	

Updated to match(es) played on 13 May 2023. Source: Worldfootball
A = Away; H = Home; W = Win; D = Draw; L = Loss

==== Matches ====
The league fixtures were announced on 20 January 2023.

19 February 1	Tokyo Verdy	1–0	Zweigen Kanazawa	Tokyo
14:00	Kato 68'	Report		Stadium: Ajinomoto Stadium; Attendance: 6,597; Referee: Keisuke Nobori

25 February 2	Omiya Ardija	2–0	Zweigen Kanazawa	Saitama
14:00	Motegi 44'; Osawa 90+5'	Report		Stadium: NACK5 Stadium Omiya; Attendance: 6,120; Referee: Reo Tanaka

5 March 3	Zweigen Kanazawa	1–2	Machida Zelvia	Kanazawa
14:00	Hayashi 90+8'	Report	Hirakawa 11'; Araki 90+1'	Stadium: Ishikawa Kanazawa Stadium; Attendance: 6,218; Referee: Atsushi Kamimura

12 March 4	Fagiano Okayama	3–0	Zweigen Kanazawa	Okayama
14:00	Buijs 45+1'; Mauk 64'; Takagi 85'	Report		Stadium: City Light Stadium; Attendance: 8,129; Referee: Koji Takasaki

19 March 5	Zweigen Kanazawa	5–2	Renofa Yamaguchi	Kanazawa
14:00	Hayashi 18' (pen.); Okuda 40', 68'; Kato 75'; Sugiura 83'	Report	Yoshioka 20'; Yamase 90+4' (pen.)	Stadium: Ishikawa Kanazawa Stadium; Attendance: 2,454; Referee: Yuzo Sutani

25 March 6	Vegalta Sendai	2–3	Zweigen Kanazawa	Sendai
14:00	Kida 41', 90+5'	Report	Ishihara 9'; Hayashi 18'; Fujimura 23'	Stadium: Yurtec Stadium Sendai; Attendance: 9,481; Referee: Toru Kakinuma

2 April 7	Zweigen Kanazawa	2–0	JEF United Chiba	Kanazawa
14:00	Léo Bahia 21'; Kato 54'	Report		Stadium: Ishikawa Kanazawa Stadium; Attendance: 3,357; Referee: Tomokazu Sato

9 April 8	Roasso Kumamoto	3–1	Zweigen Kanazawa	Kumamoto
15:00	Ishikawa 42'; Ezaki 60'; Kajiura 62'	Report	Kato 45'	Stadium: Egao Kenko Stadium; Attendance: 5,315; Referee: Shuhei Shimizu

12 April 9	Zweigen Kanazawa	3–0	Iwaki FC	Kanazawa
19:00	Sugiura 6', 14', 37'	Report		Stadium: Ishikawa Kanazawa Stadium; Attendance: 1,516; Referee: Keigo Sendachi

16 April 10	Montedio Yamagata	0–1	Zweigen Kanazawa	Tendo
14:00		Report	Kato 62'	Stadium: ND Soft Stadium Yamagata; Attendance: 6,346; Referee: Tetsuro Yoshida

23 April 11	Zweigen Kanazawa	1–2	Júbilo Iwata	Kanazawa
14:00	Shoji 50'; Onohara (yellow card) 83'	Report	Yamada 11' (pen.); K. Suzuki 45'	Stadium: Ishikawa Kanazawa Stadium; Attendance: 5,402; Referee: Kazuyoshi Enomoto

30 April 12	Zweigen Kanazawa	1–1	Fujieda MYFC	Kanazawa
14:00	Kato 21'	Report	Sugita 10', (yellow card) 89'	Stadium: Ishikawa Kanazawa Stadium; Attendance: 3,480; Referee: Keisuke Nobori

3 May 13	Tochigi SC	4–0	Zweigen Kanazawa	Utsunomiya
16:00	Yamada 5'; Omori 47'; Yano 49'; Sato 82'	Report	Oishi (yellow card) 56'; Rikiyasu (yellow card) 80'	Stadium: Tochigi Green Stadium; Attendance: 6,775; Referee: Koji Takasaki

7 May 14	Oita Trinita	4–3	Zweigen Kanazawa	Oita
14:00	Nakagawa 10', 57'; Nodake 38'; Ando 41'; Derlan (yellow card) 48'	Report	Sugiura 18'; Hayashi 32', (yellow card) 71'; Kato 55'; Jefferson Baiano (yellow card) 88'	Stadium: Resonac Dome Oita; Attendance: 7,788; Referee: Tomokazu Sato

13 May 15	Zweigen Kanazawa	2–0	V-Varen Nagasaki	Kanazawa
14:00	Shoji 20'; Hayashi 52'	Report		Stadium: Ishikawa Kanazawa Stadium; Attendance: 2,317; Referee: Toru Kakinuma

17 May 16	Tokushima Vortis	2–0	Zweigen Kanazawa	Naruto
19:00	Mori 40', 65'	Report		Stadium: Pocarisweat Stadium

21 May 17	Zweigen Kanazawa	0–1	Ventforet Kofu	Kanazawa
14:00		Report	Utaka 74'	Stadium: Ishikawa Kanazawa Stadium

28 May 18	Shimizu S-Pulse	v	Zweigen Kanazawa	Shimizu
14:00		Report		Stadium: IAI Stadium Nihondaira

3 June 19	Zweigen Kanazawa	v	Thespakusatsu Gunma	Kanazawa
14:00		Report		Stadium: Ishikawa Kanazawa Stadium

11 June 20	Blaublitz Akita	v	Zweigen Kanazawa	Akita
14:00		Report		Stadium: Soyu Stadium

17 June 21	Zweigen Kanazawa	v	Mito HollyHock	Kanazawa
18:00		Report		Stadium: Ishikawa Kanazawa Stadium

24 June 22	V-Varen Nagasaki	v	Zweigen Kanazawa	Isahaya
19:00		Report		Stadium: Transcosmos Stadium Nagasaki

=== Emperor's Cup ===
7 June 2023 Second round	Zweigen Kanazawa	v	Machida Zelvia	Kanazawa
19:00				Stadium: Ishikawa Athletics Stadium
