= List of J2 League football transfers winter 2022–23 =

Transfer list

This is a list of J2 League transfers made during the winter transfer window of the 2023 season by each club. It went from 6 January to 31 March 2023.

== Blaublitz Akita ==
Transfers in
Join on	Pos.	Player	Moving from	Transfer type
Pre-season	GK	(Japan) Akihito Ozawa	(Japan) Mito HollyHock	Free transfer
Pre-season	GK	(Japan) Kentaro Kakoi	(Japan) SC Sagamihara	Free transfer
Pre-season	GK	(Japan) Genki Yamada	(Japan) Renofa Yamaguchi	Free transfer
Pre-season	DF	(Japan) Kyowaan Hoshi	(Japan) Yokohama FC	FFree transfer
Pre-season	DF	(Japan) Takashi Kawano	(Japan) Giravanz Kitakyushu	Full transfer
Pre-season	DF	(Japan) Ryota Takada	(Japan) Hannan University	Free transfer
Pre-season	DF	(Japan) Kaito Abe	(Japan) Fagiano Okayama	Loan transfer
Pre-season	MF	(Japan) Hiroto Tanaka	(Japan) Ehime FC	Free transfer
Pre-season	MF	(Japan) Hiroto Morooka	(Japan) Fukushima United	Full transfer
Pre-season	MF	(Japan) Takuma Mizutani	(Japan) Nagano Parceiro	Full transfer
Pre-season	MF	(Japan) Hinase Suzuki	Blaublitz Akita U18s	Promotion
Pre-season	FW	(Japan) Junki Hata	(Japan) FC Gifu	Full transfer
Pre-season	FW	(Japan) Yukihito Kajiya	(Japan) Sagan Tosu	Loan transfer
Pre-season	FW	(Japan) Shion Niwa	(Japan) Zweigen Kanazawa	Loan transfer

Transfers out
Leave on	Pos.	Player	Moving to	Transfer type
Pre-season	GK	(Japan) Yoshiaki Arai	(Japan) Oita Trinita	Full transfer
Pre-season	GK	(Japan) Yudai Tanaka	(Japan) Sanfrecce Hiroshima	Full transfer
Pre-season	GK	(Japan) Kenya Matsui	(Chinese Taipei) Taichung Futuro	Free transfer
Pre-season	DF	(Japan) Shigeto Masuda	(Australia) Heidelberg United	Free transfer
Pre-season	DF	(Japan) Jurato Ikeda	(Japan) Machida Zelvia	Full transfer
Pre-season	DF	(Japan) Kaito Chida	(Japan) Tokyo Verdy	Full transfer
Pre-season	DF	(Japan) Yuko Takase	(Japan) Aventura Kawaguchi	Free transfer
Pre-season	DF	(Japan) Shintaro Kato	(Japan) Vanraure Hachinohe	Loan transfer
Pre-season	DF	(Japan) Koki Shimosaka	–	Retirement
Pre-season	MF	(Japan) Shuto Inaba	(Japan) Machida Zelvia	Full transfer
Pre-season	MF	(Japan) Taira Shige	(Japan) Oita Trinita	Full transfer
Pre-season	MF	(Japan) Makoto Fukoin	(Japan) Gainare Tottori	Free transfer
Pre-season	MF	(Japan) Nao Eguchi	(Japan) Kamatamare Sanuki	Free transfer
Pre-season	FW	(Japan) Hayate Take	(Japan) Thespakusatsu Gunma	Loan transfer
Pre-season	FW	(Japan) Koya Handa	(Japan) Verspah Oita	Loan transfer

== Fagiano Okayama ==
Transfers in
Join on	Pos.	Player	Moving from	Transfer type
Pre-season	GK	(Japan) Daiki Hotta	(Japan) Shonan Bellmare	Full transfer
Pre-season	GK	(Japan) Taiki Yamada	(Japan) Kashima Antlers	Loan transfer
Pre-season	DF	(Japan) Yoshitake Suzuki	(Japan) Mito HollyHock	Full transfer
Pre-season	MF	(Japan) Ryo Takahashi	(Japan) Shonan Bellmare	Free transfer
Pre-season	MF	(Japan) Yuya Takagi	(Japan) Yokohama FC	Full transfer
Pre-season	MF	(Japan) Sora Igawa	(Japan) Consadole Sapporo	Loan transfer
Pre-season	MF	(Japan) Ryo Tabei	(Japan) Yokohama FC	Loan transfer
Pre-season	MF	(Japan) Nagi Kawatani	(Japan) Shimizu S-Pulse	Loan transfer
Pre-season	MF	(Japan) Kyoya Yamada	(Japan) Kochi United	Loan return
Pre-season	MF	(Japan) Tomoya Fukumoto	(Japan) FC Osaka	Loan return
Pre-season	FW	(Brazil) Lucão	(Japan) Matsumoto Yamaga	Free transfer
Pre-season	FW	(Japan) Ryo Nagai	(Japan) Sanfrecce Hiroshima	Free transfer
Pre-season	FW	(Japan) Isa Sakamoto	(Japan) Gamba Osaka	Loan transfer
Pre-season	FW	(Japan) Solomon Sakuragawa	(Japan) JEF United Chiba	Loan transfer

Transfers out
Leave on	Pos.	Player	Moving to	Transfer type
Pre-season	GK	(Japan) Hiroki Mawatari	(Japan) Shonan Bellmare	Full transfer
Pre-season	DF	(Japan) Yuma Hiroki	(Australia) Boroondara-Carey Eagles	FFree transfer
Pre-season	DF	(Japan) Shuhei Tokumoto	(Japan) FC Tokyo	Full transfer
Pre-season	DF	(Japan) Carlos Duke	(Japan) SC Sagamihara	Free transfer
Pre-season	DF	(Japan) Kaito Abe	(Japan) Blaublitz Akita	Loan transfer
Pre-season	DF	(Japan) Koji Sugiyama	(Japan) Verspah Oita	Loan transfer
Pre-season	DF	(Japan) Shumpei Naruse	(Japan) Nagoya Grampus	Loan expiration
Pre-season	MF	(Japan) Tomohiko Miyazaki	(Japan) Fukushima United	Free transfer
Pre-season	MF	(Japan) Kohei Kiyama	(Japan) Matsumoto Yamaga	Free transfer
Pre-season	MF	(Japan) Kiwara Miyazaki	(Japan) Iwaki FC	Loan transfer
Pre-season	MF	(Japan) Yuto Hikida	(Japan) Ehime FC	Loan transfer
Pre-season	MF	(Japan) Shinnosuke Matsuki	(Japan) Verspah Oita	Loan transfer
Pre-season	MF	(Japan) Kenji Sekido	–	Retirement
Pre-season	FW	(Malaysia) Hadi Fayyadh	(Malaysia) Perak FC	Free transfer
Pre-season	FW	(Australia) Mitchell Duke	(Japan) Machida Zelvia	Full transfer
Pre-season	FW	(Japan) Haruto Shirai	(Japan) FC Ryukyu	Free transfer
Pre-season	FW	(Japan) Kazuki Saito	(Japan) Criacao Shinjuku	Free transfer

== Fujieda MYFC ==
Transfers in
Join on	Pos.	Player	Moving from	Transfer type
Pre-season	GK	(Japan) Tomoya Ueda	(Japan) Omiya Ardija	Free transfer
Pre-season	GK	(Japan) Kosuke Okanishi	(Japan) Ventforet Kofu	Full transfer
Pre-season	GK	(Japan) Kai Chidi Kitamura	(Japan) Toin University of Yokohama	Free transfer
Pre-season	DF	(Japan) Masayuki Yamada	(Japan) Omiya Ardija	Free transfer
Pre-season	DF	(Japan) Kotaro Yamahara	(Japan) Tokyo Int. University	Free transfer
Pre-season	DF	(Japan) Kota Kudo	(Japan) Urawa Red Diamonds	Loan transfer
Pre-season	MF	(Japan) Taiki Arai	(Japan) Gainare Tottori	Full transfer
Pre-season	MF	(Japan) Naoya Uozato	(Japan) Gainare Tottori	Full transfer
Pre-season	MF	(Japan) Yudai Tokunaga	(Japan) Tegevajaro Miyazaki	Full transfer
Pre-season	MF	(Japan) Yosei Ozeki	(Japan) Toin University of Yokohama	Free transfer
Pre-season	MF	(Japan) Kota Osone	(Japan) Vegalta Sendai	Loan transfer
Pre-season	FW	(Brazil) Anderson Chaves	(Brazil) Moto Club	Free transfer
Pre-season	FW	(Japan) Kenshiro Hirao	(Japan) Chuo University	Free transfer
Pre-season	FW	(Japan) Ken Yamura	(Japan) Albirex Niigata	Loan transfer

Transfers out
Leave on	Pos.	Player	Moving to	Transfer type
Pre-season	GK	(Japan) Kei Uchiyama	(Japan) Sagan Tosu	Full transfer
Pre-season	GK	(Japan) Takuya Sugimoto	(Japan) Fukui United	Free transfer
Pre-season	GK	(Japan) Takuma Narahashi	(Japan) Okinawa SV	Free transfer
Pre-season	DF	(Japan) Hayato Nukui	(Japan) SC Sagamihara	Free transfer
Pre-season	DF	(Japan) Kaito Kamiya	(Japan) Kawasaki Frontale	Loan expiration
Pre-season	DF	(Japan) Takashi Akiyama	–	Retirement
Pre-season	MF	(Japan) Jun Suzuki	(Lithuania) FK Sūduva	Free transfer
Pre-season	MF	(Japan) Koki Matsumura	(Japan) YSCC Yokohama	Free transfer
Pre-season	MF	(Japan) Kenta Hori	(Japan) Veroskronos Tsuno	Free transfer
Pre-season	MF	(Japan) Yudai Iwama	(Japan) ReinMeer Aomori	Free transfer
Pre-season	MF	(Japan) Ren Shibamoto	(Japan) Gamba Osaka	Loan expiration
Pre-season	FW	(Japan) Tomoyuki Doi	(Albania) KF Bylis	Free transfer
Pre-season	FW	(Japan) Takuya Miyamoto	(Japan) Vanraure Hachinohe	Full transfer
Pre-season	FW	(Japan) Tsugutoshi Oishi	(Japan) Fukui United	Free transfer
Pre-season	FW	(Japan) Yuki Oshitani	(Japan) Fukui United	Free transfer
Pre-season	FW	(Japan) Naoto Miki	(Japan) Júbilo Iwata	Loan expiration

== Iwaki FC ==
Transfers in
Join on	Pos.	Player	Moving from	Transfer type
Pre-season	GK	(Japan) Toru Takagiwa	(Japan) Tokyo Verdy	Loan transfer
Pre-season	DF	(Japan) Yusuke Ishida	(Japan) Gainare Tottori	Full transfer
Pre-season	DF	(Japan) Shuhei Hayami	(Japan) Tokoha University	Free transfer
Pre-season	DF	(Japan) Takumi Kawamura	(Japan) Osaka University HSS	Free transfer
Pre-season	DF	(Japan) Yuma Tsujioka	(Japan) International Pf. University	Loan transfer; 2023 DSP
Pre-season	MF	(Japan) Naoki Kase	(Japan) Ryutsu Keizai University	Free transfer
Pre-season	MF	(Japan) Asahi Haga	(Japan) Sakushin Gakuin University	Free transfer
Pre-season	MF	(Japan) Mizuki Kaburagi	(Japan) Takushoku University	Free transfer
Pre-season	MF	(Japan) Yoshihiro Shimoda	(Japan) Kashima Antlers	Loan transfer
Pre-season	MF	(Japan) Kiwara Miyazaki	(Japan) Fagiano Okayama	Loan transfer
Pre-season	MF	(Japan) Yuma Kato	(Japan) Takushoku University	Loan transfer; 2023 DSP
Pre-season	FW	(Japan) Iori Sakamoto	(Japan) Hotoku Gakuen HS	Free transfer
Pre-season	FW	(Japan) Yoshihito Kondo	(Japan) Nagoya Gakuin University	Loan transfer; 2023 DSP

Transfers out
Leave on	Pos.	Player	Moving to	Transfer type
Pre-season	GK	(Japan) Daiki Sakata	(Japan) Avispa Fukuoka	Full transfer
Pre-season	GK	(Japan) Kanta Tanaka	(Japan) Tochigi City	Free transfer
Pre-season	DF	(Japan) Ryo Odajima	(Japan) Okinawa SV	Free transfer
Pre-season	DF	(Japan) Daigo Masuzaki	(Japan) Cobaltore Onagawa	Free transfer
Pre-season	DF	(Japan) Kyowaan Hoshi	(Japan) Yokohama FC	Loan expiration
Pre-season	DF	(Japan) Tetsuya Yonezawa	(Japan) Okinawa SV	Free transfer
Pre-season	MF	(Japan) Masaru Hidaka	(Japan) JEF United Chiba	Full transfer
Pre-season	MF	(Japan) Kentaro Matsumoto	(Japan) Tokyo 23	Free transfer
Pre-season	MF	(Japan) Genya Sekino	(Japan) Tochigi City	Free transfer
Pre-season	MF	(Japan) Tomoki Yoshida	(Japan) Kochi United	Loan transfer
Pre-season	MF	(Japan) Nagi Kawatani	(Japan) Shimizu S-Pulse	Loan expiration
Pre-season	MF	(Japan) Ryoma Ito	–	Contract expiration
Pre-season	FW	(Japan) Shota Suzuki	(Japan) Kagoshima United	Free transfer
Pre-season	FW	(Japan) Daigo Furukawa	(Japan) FC Osaka	Loan transfer

== JEF United Chiba ==
Transfers in
Join on	Pos.	Player	Moving from	Transfer type
Pre-season	GK	(Japan) Issei Kondo	(Japan) Hosei University	Free transfer
Pre-season	DF	(Japan) Riku Matsuda	(Japan) Zweigen Kanazawa	Full transfer
Pre-season	DF	(Japan) Kazuki Tanaka	(Japan) Kyoto Sanga	Loan transfer
Pre-season	DF	(Japan) Shuntaro Yaguchi	JEF United Chiba U18	Promotion
Pre-season	MF	(Japan) Naoki Tsubaki	(Japan) Yokohama F. Marinos	Full transfer
Pre-season	MF	(Japan) Masaru Hidaka	(Japan) Iwaki FC	Full transfer
Pre-season	FW	(Japan) Hiroto Goya	(Japan) Oita Trinita	Full transfer
Pre-season	FW	(Japan) Hiiro Komori	(Japan) Niigata University HW	Free transfer
Pre-season	FW	(Japan) Ryuta Shimmyo	JEF United Chiba U18	Promotion

Transfers out
Leave on	Pos.	Player	Moving to	Transfer type
13 Mar	DF	(Japan) Shuto Tanabe	(Japan) JEF United Chiba	Loan cancellation
Pre-season	DF	(South Korea) Jang Min-gyu	(Japan) Machida Zelvia	Full transfer
Pre-season	DF	(Brazil) Daniel Alves	–	Contract expiration
Pre-season	MF	(Japan) Yosuke Akiyama	(Japan) Vegalta Sendai	Loan expiration
Pre-season	MF	(Japan) Shuto Kojima	(Japan) YSCC Yokohama	Free transfer
Pre-season	FW	(Brazil) Saldanha	(Azerbaijan) Neftçi Baku	Loan transfer
Pre-season	FW	(Japan) Solomon Sakuragawa	(Japan) Fagiano Okayama	Loan transfer
Pre-season	FW	(Japan) Taichi Sakuma	(Japan) Vanraure Hachinohe	Loan transfer
Pre-season	FW	(Japan) Kengo Kawamata	–	Contract expiration
Pre-season	FW	(Brazil) Tiago Leonço	(United Arab Emirates) Al-Dhafra FC	Free transfer
Pre-season	FW	(Brazil) Ricardo Lopes	(Ukraine) Vorskla Poltava	Free transfer

== Júbilo Iwata ==
Due to a ban imposed by FIFA, after an illegal breach of contract between Fabián González and an unnamed Thai club, Júbilo will be unable to make any new signings from outside of the 2022 club system during both transfer windows of the 2023 season. Players out on loan can normally return to the club. Tokyo International University graduate Shu Morooka was scheduled to join Júbilo for the 2023 season, but as the club received a transfer ban, his provisional contract with Júbilo was cancelled, and he later joined Kashima Antlers. The club filed an appeal about the CAS decision over the subject, but it was denied.

Transfers in
Join on	Pos.	Player	Moving from	Transfer type
10 Mar	MF	(Japan) Hiroto Uemura	(Japan) Waseda University	Loan transfer 2023 DSP
Pre-season	DF	(Japan) So Nakagawa	(Japan) FC Ryukyu	Loan return
Pre-season	DF	(Japan) Kaito Suzuki	(Japan) Tochigi SC	Loan return
Pre-season	MF	(Japan) Kotaro Fujikawa	(Japan) Giravanz Kitakyushu	Loan return
Pre-season	MF	(Japan) Takeaki Harigaya	(Japan) Giravanz Kitakyushu	Loan return
Pre-season	FW	(Japan) Keisuke Goto	Júbilo Iwata U18s	Promotion

Transfers out
Leave on	Pos.	Player	Moving to	Transfer type
21 Mar	FW	(Japan) Kenyu Sugimoto	(Japan) Yokohama F. Marinos	Loan transfer
Pre-season	GK	(Moldova) Alexei Koșelev	–	Contract expiration
Pre-season	DF	(Japan) Kentaro Oi	(Australia) Eastern Lions	Full transfer
Pre-season	MF	(Japan) Atsushi Kurokawa	(Japan) Machida Zelvia	Full transfer
Pre-season	MF	(Japan) Yutaro Hakamata	(Japan) Omiya Ardija	Full transfer
Pre-season	FW	(Japan) Naoto Miki	(Japan) Fukushima United	Loan transfer

== Machida Zelvia ==
Transfers in
Join on	Pos.	Player	Moving from	Transfer type
8 Mar	FW	(Japan) Shota Fujio	(Japan) Cerezo Osaka	Loan transfer
Pre-season	GK	(Serbia) Nedeljko Stojišić	(Japan) Vegalta Sendai	Free transfer
Pre-season	DF	(South Korea) Jang Min-gyu	(Japan) JEF United Chiba	Full transfer
Pre-season	DF	(Japan) Jurato Ikeda	(Japan) Blaublitz Akita	Full transfer
Pre-season	DF	(Spain) Carlos Gutiérrez	(Japan) Tochigi SC	Full transfer
Pre-season	DF	(Japan) Mizuki Uchida	(Japan) Kamatamare Sanuki	Full transfer
Pre-season	DF	(Japan) Soichiro Fukaminato	(Japan) Rissho University	Free transfer
Pre-season	DF	(Japan) Yudai Fujiwara	(Japan) Urawa Red Diamonds	Loan transfer
Pre-season	MF	(Japan) Shuto Inaba	(Japan) Blaublitz Akita	Full transfer
Pre-season	MF	(Japan) Atsushi Kurokawa	(Japan) Júbilo Iwata	Full transfer
Pre-season	MF	(Japan) Hokuto Shimoda	(Japan) Oita Trinita	Full transfer
Pre-season	MF	(Japan) Daigo Takahashi	(Japan) Shimizu S-Pulse	Full transfer
Pre-season	MF	(Japan) Yohei Okuyama	(Japan) Iwate Grulla Morioka	Full transfer
Pre-season	MF	(Japan) Sho Fuseya	(Japan) Kokushikan University	Free transfer
Pre-season	FW	(Brazil) Erik	(China) Changchun Yatai	Full transfer
Pre-season	FW	(Australia) Mitchell Duke	(Japan) Fagiano Okayama	Full transfer
Pre-season	FW	(Japan) Takaya Numata	(Japan) Renofa Yamaguchi	Full transfer
Pre-season	FW	(Japan) Yuya Takazawa	(Japan) Oita Trinita	Free transfer
Pre-season	FW	(Japan) Yu Hirakawa	(Japan) Yamanashi Gakuin University	Free transfer
Pre-season	FW	(Japan) Shunta Araki	(Japan) Sagan Tosu	Loan transfer

Transfers out
Leave on	Pos.	Player	Moving to	Transfer type
16 Mar	DF	(Japan) Shohei Takahashi	(Japan) Vissel Kobe	Loan transfer
Pre-season	DF	(Japan) Jun Okano	(Japan) V-Varen Nagasaki	Full transfer
Pre-season	DF	(Japan) Takumi Narasaka	(Japan) Kamatamare Sanuki	Loan transfer
Pre-season	DF	(Japan) Shunya Suganuma	–	Contract expiration
Pre-season	MF	(Japan) Taiki Hirato	(Japan) Kyoto Sanga	Full transfer
Pre-season	MF	(Japan) Kaishu Sano	(Japan) Kashima Antlers	Full transfer
Pre-season	MF	(Japan) Ariajasuru Hasegawa	–	Contract expiration
Pre-season	FW	(Japan) Shusuke Ota	(Japan) Albirex Niigata	Full transfer
Pre-season	FW	(Brazil) Dudu Pacheco	(Japan) FC Imabari	Full transfer
Pre-season	FW	(North Korea) Chong Tese	–	Retirement
Pre-season	FW	(Brazil) Vinícius Araújo	(Qatar) Umm-Salal	Free transfer

== Mito HollyHock ==
Transfers in
Join on	Pos.	Player	Moving from	Transfer type
Pre-season	GK	(Japan) Ryusei Haruna	(Japan) Cerezo Osaka U18s	Free transfer
Pre-season	DF	(Japan) Keita Matsuda	(Japan) Toyo University	Free transfer
Pre-season	DF	(Japan) Kazuma Nagai	(Japan) Kyoto Sanga	Full transfer
Pre-season	DF	(Japan) Yota Tanabe	(Japan) Ococias Kyoto	Loan return
Pre-season	MF	(Japan) Reo Yasunaga	(Japan) Yokohama FC	Full transfer
Pre-season	MF	(Japan) Ren Inoue	(Japan) Toyo University	Free transfer
Pre-season	MF	(Japan) Hidetoshi Takeda	(Japan) Urawa Red Diamonds	Loan transfer
Pre-season	MF	(Japan) Motoki Ohara	(Japan) Sanfrecce Hiroshima	Loan transfer
Pre-season	FW	(Japan) Yuki Kusano	(Japan) FC Ryukyu	Full transfer
Pre-season	FW	(Japan) Shimon Teranuma	(Japan) Toin University of Yokohama	Free transfer
Pre-season	FW	(Japan) Yusei Uchida	Mito HollyHock U18s	Promotion

Transfers out
Leave on	Pos.	Player	Moving to	Transfer type
17 Mar	DF	(Japan) Keita Matsuda	(Japan) FC Osaka	Loan transfer
Pre-season	GK	(Japan) Akihito Ozawa	(Japan) Blaublitz Akita	Free transfer
Pre-season	DF	(Japan) Yuto Mori	(Japan) Kamatamare Sanuki	Full transfer
Pre-season	DF	(Japan) Yoshitake Suzuki	(Japan) Fagiano Okayama	Full transfer
Pre-season	DF	(Germany) Leonard Brodersen	(Germany) Teutonia Ottensen	Free transfer
Pre-season	DF	(Japan) SteviaEgbus Mikuni	(Japan) FC Gifu	Free transfer
Pre-season	MF	(Japan) Yutaka Soneda	(Japan) Ehime FC	Full transfer
Pre-season	MF	(Japan) Kaito Hirata	(Japan) ReinMeer Aomori	Free transfer
Pre-season	MF	(Japan) Shoma Otoizumi	(Japan) Nagano Parceiro	Loan transfer
Pre-season	MF	(Japan) Naoki Tsubaki	(Japan) Yokohama F. Marinos	Loan expiration
Pre-season	MF	(Japan) Kodai Dohi	(Japan) Sanfrecce Hiroshima	Loan expiration
Pre-season	MF	(Japan) Jun Kanakubo	–	Retirement
Pre-season	FW	(Japan) Kosuke Kinoshita	(Japan) Kyoto Sanga	Full transfer

== Montedio Yamagata ==
Transfers in
Join on	Pos.	Player	Moving from	Transfer type
Pre-season	DF	(Japan) Zain Issaka	(Japan) Kawasaki Frontale	Full transfer
Pre-season	DF	(Japan) Yuta Kumamoto	(Japan) Avispa Fukuoka	Full transfer
Pre-season	DF	(Japan) Wataru Tanaka	(Japan) Vegalta Sendai	Free transfer
Pre-season	DF	(Japan) Taiju Yoshida	(Japan) Yamanashi Gakuin University	Free transfer
Pre-season	DF	(Japan) Shumpei Naruse	(Japan) Nagoya Grampus	Loan transfer
Pre-season	DF	(Japan) Keisuke Nishimura	(Japan) Omiya Ardija	Loan transfer
Pre-season	MF	(Japan) Masahito Ono	(Japan) Omiya Ardija	Full transfer
Pre-season	MF	(Japan) Kaisei Kano	(Japan) Kanto Gakuin University	Loan transfer; 2023 DSP
Pre-season	FW	(Japan) Yusuke Goto	(Japan) Shimizu S-Pulse	Free transfer
Pre-season	FW	(Japan) Junya Takahashi	(Japan) Fukushima United	Loan return

Transfers out
Leave on	Pos.	Player	Moving to	Transfer type
Pre-season	DF	(Japan) Riku Handa	(Japan) Gamba Osaka	Full transfer
Pre-season	DF	(Japan) Kosuke Yamazaki	(Japan) Sagan Tosu	Full transfer
Pre-season	DF	(Japan) Kiriya Sakamoto	(Japan) Sagan Tosu	Loan transfer
Pre-season	DF	(Japan) Ryota Matsumoto	–	Retirement
Pre-season	MF	(Japan) Mutsuki Hirooka	(Japan) Fukui United	Free transfer
Pre-season	MF	(Japan) Hayata Komatsu	(South Korea) Gyeongju KHNP	Free transfer
Pre-season	FW	(Japan) Kota Yamada	(Japan) Kashiwa Reysol	Full transfer
Pre-season	FW	(Japan) Koki Kido	(Japan) ReinMeer Aomori	FFree transfer
Pre-season	FW	(Japan) Shunta Nakamura	(Australia) St George	Free transfer
Pre-season	FW	(Japan) Kanta Matsumoto	(Japan) Tegevajaro Miyazaki	Loan transfer
Pre-season	FW	(Japan) Ryonosuke Kabayama	(Japan) Yokohama F. Marinos	Loan expiration
Pre-season	FW	(Japan) Yuta Fujihara	(Japan) Sagan Tosu	Loan expiration
Pre-season	FW	(Japan) Akira Silvano Disaro	(Japan) Shimizu S-Pulse	Loan expiration
Pre-season	FW	(Japan) Koki Kido	–	Contract expiration

== Oita Trinita ==
Transfers in
Join on	Pos.	Player	Moving from	Transfer type
Pre-season	GK	(Japan) Yoshiaki Arai	(Japan) Blaublitz Akita	Full transfer
Pre-season	GK	(Brazil) Matheus Teixeira	(Brazil) EC Bahia	Loan transfer
Pre-season	DF	(Brazil) Derlan	(Brazil) Guarani FC	Free transfer
Pre-season	DF	(Japan) Tomoya Ando	(Japan) FC Imabari	Full transfer
Pre-season	DF	(Japan) Yusuke Matsuo	(Japan) Kansai University	Free transfer
Pre-season	DF	(Brazil) Pereira	(Brazil) Atlético Goianiense	Full transfer; Loan made permanent
Pre-season	DF	(Japan) Yusho Takahashi	(Japan) Veroskronos Tsuno	Loan return
Pre-season	MF	(Japan) Taira Shige	(Japan) Blaublitz Akita	Full transfer
Pre-season	MF	(Japan) Ren Ikeda	(Japan) FC Ryukyu	Full transfer
Pre-season	MF	(Japan) Josei Sato	Oita Trinita U18s	Promotion
Pre-season	MF	(Japan) Kenshin Yasuda	Oita Trinita U18s	Promotion

Transfers out
Leave on	Pos.	Player	Moving to	Transfer type
Pre-season	GK	(Japan) Shun Yoshida	(Japan) Urawa Red Diamonds	Full transfer
Pre-season	GK	(Japan) Taro Hamada	(Japan) Nagano Parceiro	Loan transfer
Pre-season	DF	(Japan) Yuta Koide	(Japan) Vegalta Sendai	Full transfer
Pre-season	DF	(Japan) Yuto Misao	(Japan) Kyoto Sanga	Full transfer
Pre-season	DF	(Japan) Yukitoshi Ito	–	Retirement
Pre-season	MF	(Japan) Kenta Inoue	(Japan) Yokohama F. Marinos	Full transfer
Pre-season	MF	(Japan) Hokuto Shimoda	(Japan) Machida Zelvia	Full transfer
Pre-season	MF	(Japan) Seigo Kobayashi	(Japan) Renofa Yamaguchi	Full transfer
Pre-season	MF	(Japan) Asahi Masuyama	(Japan) V-Varen Nagasaki	Full transfer
Pre-season	MF	(Japan) Rei Matsumoto	(Japan) J-Lease FC	Free transfer
Pre-season	MF	(Japan) Yuki Kobayashi	–	Retirement
Pre-season	FW	(Japan) Hiroto Goya	(Japan) JEF United Chiba	Full transfer
Pre-season	FW	(Japan) Yuya Takazawa	(Japan) Machida Zelvia	Free transfer
Pre-season	FW	(Japan) Mu Kanazaki	(Japan) FC Ryukyu	Free transfer
Pre-season	FW	(Brazil) Eduardo Neto	–	Contract expiration

== Omiya Ardija ==
Transfers in
Join on	Pos.	Player	Moving from	Transfer type
Pre-season	GK	(Japan) Ko Shimura	(Japan) Giravanz Kitakyushu	Full transfer; Loan made permanent
Pre-season	GK	(Japan) Takashi Kasahara	(Japan) V-Varen Nagasaki	Loan return
Pre-season	DF	(Japan) Niki Urakawa	(Japan) Ventforet Kofu	Full transfer
Pre-season	DF	(Japan) Rio Omori	(Japan) FC Tokyo	Loan transfer
Pre-season	MF	(Japan) Yutaro Hakamata	(Japan) Júbilo Iwata	Full transfer; Loan made permanent
Pre-season	MF	(Japan) Fumiya Takayanagi	(Japan) Toyo University	Free transfer
Pre-season	MF	(Japan) Shunya Suzuki	(Japan) Waseda University	Free transfer
Pre-season	MF	(Japan) Toshiki Ishikawa	(Japan) Ventforet Kofu	Loan return
Pre-season	MF	(Japan) Raisei Abe	Omiya Ardija U18s	Promotion
Pre-season	FW	(Japan) Keisuke Muroi	(Japan) Toyo University	Free transfer
Pre-season	FW	(Brazil) Rodrigo Angelotti	(Japan) Kashiwa Reysol	Loan transfer
Pre-season	FW	(Japan) Tomoya Osawa	(Japan) Ehime FC	Loan return

Transfers out
Leave on	Pos.	Player	Moving to	Transfer type
29 Mar	FW	(Japan) Atsushi Kawata	(Japan) Sagan Tosu	Full transfer
Pre-season	GK	(Japan) Tomoki Ueda	(Japan) Fujieda MYFC	Free transfer
Pre-season	DF	(Japan) Masayuki Yamada	(Japan) Fujieda MYFC	Free transfer
Pre-season	DF	(Japan) Keisuke Nishimura	(Japan) Montedio Yamagata	Loan transfer
Pre-season	DF	(Japan) Masakazu Tashiro	(Japan) Iwate Grulla Morioka	Free transfer
Pre-season	DF	(Japan) Shoi Yoshinaga	(Japan) Ehime FC	Loan transfer
Pre-season	MF	(Japan) Masahito Ono	(Japan) Montedio Yamagata	Full transfer
Pre-season	MF	(Japan) Shinya Yajima	(Japan) Renofa Yamaguchi	Full transfer
Pre-season	MF	(Japan) Shunsuke Kikuchi	(Japan) Ehime FC	Free transfer
Pre-season	MF	(Japan) Soya Takada	(Japan) Tokushima Vortis	Loan transfer
Pre-season	MF	(Japan) Hidetoshi Takeda	(Japan) Urawa Red Diamonds	Loan expiration

== Renofa Yamaguchi ==
Transfers in
Join on	Pos.	Player	Moving from	Transfer type
Pre-season	GK	(South Korea) Choi Hyun-chan	(South Korea) Sunmoon University	Free transfer
Pre-season	DF	(Japan) Keigo Numata	(Japan) FC Ryukyu	Free transfer
Pre-season	DF	(Japan) Daisuke Matsumoto	(Japan) Sagan Tosu	Loan transfer
Pre-season	DF	(Japan) Reo Kunimoto	(Singapore) Albirex Niigata (S)	Loan return
Pre-season	MF	(Japan) Seigo Kobayashi	(Japan) Oita Trinita	Full transfer
Pre-season	MF	(Japan) Shinya Yajima	(Japan) Omiya Ardija	Full transfer
Pre-season	MF	(Japan) Toshiya Tanaka	(Japan) Thespakusatsu Gunma	Full transfer
Pre-season	FW	(Japan) Yusuke Minagawa	(Japan) Vegalta Sendai	Full transfer
Pre-season	FW	(Japan) Kazuya Noyori	(Japan) Osaka University HSS	Free transfer
Pre-season	FW	(Japan) Taiyo Igarashi	(Japan) Kawasaki Frontale	Loan transfer
Pre-season	FW	(Japan) Yuan Matsuhashi	(Japan) Tokyo Verdy	Loan transfer

Transfers out
Leave on	Pos.	Player	Moving to	Transfer type
Pre-season	GK	(Japan) Genki Yamada	(Japan) Blaublitz Akita	Free transfer
Pre-season	GK	(Japan) Akira Fantini	(Japan) Fukushima United	Loan expiration
Pre-season	DF	(Japan) Ryosuke Ito	(Japan) Fukui United	Free transfer
Pre-season	DF	(Japan) Kaili Shimbo	(Japan) Iwate Grulla Morioka	Loan transfer
Pre-season	DF	(Japan) Kaito Kuwahara	(Japan) Avispa Fukuoka	Loan expiration
Pre-season	DF	(Japan) Wataru Tanaka	(Japan) Vegalta Sendai	Loan expiration
Pre-season	DF	(Japan) Hirofumi Watanabe	–	Retirement
Pre-season	DF	(Japan) Kaito Oki	–	Retirement
Pre-season	DF	(Japan) Kosuke Kikuchi	–	Retirement
Pre-season	MF	(Japan) Kazuma Takai	(Japan) Yokohama FC	Full transfer
Pre-season	MF	(Japan) Hikaru Manabe	(Japan) Tegevajaro Miyazaki	Free transfer
Pre-season	MF	(Japan) Yatsunori Shimaya	(Japan) Sonio Takamatsu	Free transfer
Pre-season	MF	(Japan) Kento Hashimoto	(Japan) Yokohama FC	Loan transfer
Pre-season	MF	(Japan) Hikaru Naruoka	(Japan) Shimizu S-Pulse	Loan expiration
Pre-season	MF	(Japan) Kentaro Sato	–	Retirement
Pre-season	FW	(Japan) Takaya Numata	(Japan) Machida Zelvia	Full transfer
Pre-season	FW	(Japan) Kazuhito Kishida	(Japan) Baleine Shimonoseki	Free transfer
Pre-season	FW	(Japan) Reoto Kodama	(Japan) Sagan Tosu	Loan expiration

== Roasso Kumamoto ==
Transfers in
Join on	Pos.	Player	Moving from	Transfer type
Pre-season	DF	(Japan) Makoto Okazaki	(Japan) FC Tokyo	Full transfer
Pre-season	DF	(Japan) Yuya Aizawa	(Japan) Komazawa University	Free transfer
Pre-season	DF	(Japan) Kaito Miyazaki	(Japan) NIFS Kanoya	Full transfer
Pre-season	MF	(Japan) Takuya Shimamura	(Japan) FC Imabari	Free transfer
Pre-season	MF	(Japan) Ryotaro Onishi	(Japan) FC Gifu	Full transfer
Pre-season	MF	(Japan) Yuki Omoto	(Japan) FC Ryukyu	Full transfer
Pre-season	MF	(Japan) Tsubasa Togo	(Japan) Nippon SS University	Free transfer
Pre-season	MF	(Japan) Ayumu Toyoda	(Japan) Chuo University	Free transfer
Pre-season	FW	(Japan) Rimu Matsuoka	(Japan) Tochigi SC	Full transfer
Pre-season	FW	(Japan) Daichi Ishikawa	(Japan) Gainare Tottori	Full transfer
Pre-season	FW	(Japan) Shun Osaki	(Japan) Fukuoka University	Free transfer
Pre-season	FW	(Japan) Yutaka Michiwaki	(Japan) Roasso Kumamoto U18s	Promotion

Transfers out
Leave on	Pos.	Player	Moving to	Transfer type
Pre-season	DF	(Japan) So Kawahara	(Japan) Sagan Tosu	Full transfer
Pre-season	DF	(Japan) Koki Sakamoto	(Japan) Yokohama FC	Full transfer
Pre-season	DF	(Japan) Masahiro Sugata	(Japan) Vegalta Sendai	Full transfer
Pre-season	DF	(Japan) Shuichi Sakai	(Japan) Thespakusatsu Gunma	Full transfer
Pre-season	DF	(Japan) Osamu Henry Iyoha	(Japan) Sanfrecce Hiroshima	Loan expiration
Pre-season	DF	(Japan) Kotaro Higashino	(Japan) J-Lease FC	Free transfer
Pre-season	DF	(Brazil) Leo Kenta	–	Contract expiration
Pre-season	MF	(Japan) Naohiro Sugiyama	(Japan) Gamba Osaka	Full transfer
Pre-season	MF	(Japan) Sota Higashide	(Japan) Tegevajaro Miyazaki	FFree transfer
Pre-season	MF	(Japan) Kosei Tajiri	(Japan) Kochi United	Free transfer
Pre-season	MF	(Japan) Keitatsu Kojima	(Japan) Ococias Kyoto	Free transfer
Pre-season	MF	(Brazil) Thales Paula	(Japan) Nagoya Grampus	Loan expiration
Pre-season	MF	(Japan) Keitatsu Kojima	–	Contract expiration
Pre-season	FW	(Japan) Toshiki Takahashi	(Japan) Urawa Red Diamonds	Full transfer
Pre-season	FW	(Japan) Kakeru Higuchi	(Japan) Kochi United	Free transfer

== Shimizu S-Pulse ==
Transfers in
Join on	Pos.	Player	Moving from	Transfer type
Pre-season	GK	(Japan) Ryoya Abe	(Japan) Chuo Gakuin University	Free transfer
Pre-season	DF	(Japan) Kengo Kitazume	(Japan) Kashiwa Reysol	Full transfer
Pre-season	DF	(Japan) Yuji Takahashi	(Japan) Kashiwa Reysol	Full transfer
Pre-season	DF	(Japan) Yutaka Yoshida	(Japan) Nagoya Grampus	Full transfer
Pre-season	DF	(Japan) Taketo Ochiai	(Japan) Hosei University	Free transfer
Pre-season	DF	(Japan) Takumu Kenmotsu	(Japan) Waseda University	Free transfer
Pre-season	DF	(Japan) Shuta Kikuchi	(Japan) V-Varen Nagasaki	Loan return
Pre-season	MF	(Japan) Hikaru Naruoka	(Japan) Renofa Yamaguchi	Loan return
Pre-season	FW	(Japan) Yosuke Morishige	(Japan) Nihon Fujisawa HS	Free transfer
Pre-season	FW	(Japan) Sena Saito	(Japan) Ryutsu Keizai University	Free transfer
Pre-season	FW	(Japan) Akira Silvano Disaro	(Japan) Montedio Yamagata	Loan return

Transfers out
Leave on	Pos.	Player	Moving to	Transfer type
19 Mar	MF	(Japan) Daiki Matsuoka	(Brazil) Grêmio Novorizontino	Loan transfer
Pre-season	GK	(Japan) Kengo Nagai	(Japan) Yokohama FC	Loan transfer
Pre-season	DF	(Japan) Eiichi Katayama	(Japan) Kashiwa Reysol	Full transfer
Pre-season	DF	(Japan) Yugo Tatsuta	(Japan) Kashiwa Reysol	Full transfer
Pre-season	DF	(Brazil) Valdo	(Japan) V-Varen Nagasaki	Full transfer
Pre-season	DF	(Brazil) Yago Pikachu	(Brazil) Fortaleza EC	Loan transfer
Pre-season	MF	(Japan) Daigo Takahashi	(Japan) Machida Zelvia	Full transfer
Pre-season	MF	(Japan) Teruki Hara	(Switzerland) Grasshoppers	Loan transfer
Pre-season	MF	(Japan) Nagi Kawatani	(Japan) Fagiano Okayama	Loan transfer
Pre-season	MF	(Japan) Yasufumi Nishimura	(Japan) Nagano Parceiro	Loan transfer
Pre-season	FW	(Japan) Yusuke Goto	(Japan) Montedio Yamagata	Free transfer
Pre-season	FW	(Japan) Ibrahim Junior Kuribara	(Japan) SC Sagamihara	Free transfer
Pre-season	FW	(Japan) Yuito Suzuki	(France) RC Strasbourg	Loan transfer
Pre-season	FW	(Japan) Kanta Chiba	(Japan) Tokushima Vortis	Loan transfer
Pre-season	FW	(Japan) Aoi Ando	(Japan) Azul Claro Numazu	Loan transfer
Pre-season	FW	(Japan) Yuta Taki	(Japan) Matsumoto Yamaga	Loan transfer

== Thespakusatsu Gunma ==
Transfers in
Join on	Pos.	Player	Moving from	Transfer type
Pre-season	GK	(Japan) Ryo Ishii	(Japan) Urawa Red Diamonds	Free transfer
Pre-season	DF	(Japan) Daiki Nakashio	(Japan) Yokohama FC	Full transfer
Pre-season	DF	(Japan) Shuichi Sakai	(Japan) Roasso Kumamoto	Full transfer
Pre-season	DF	(Japan) Kenta Kikuchi	(Japan) Senshu University	Free transfer
Pre-season	MF	(Japan) Chie Edoojon Kawakami	(Japan) Tokushima Vortis	Full transfer
Pre-season	MF	(Japan) Yudai Nakata	(Japan) Tiamo Hirakata	Loan return
Pre-season	FW	(Japan) Ryo Sato	(Japan) Giravanz Kitakyushu	Full transfer
Pre-season	FW	(Japan) Luna Iwamoto	(Japan) Kanto Gakuin University	Free transfer
Pre-season	FW	(Japan) Toranosuke Onoseki	(Japan) Takasaki UHW HS	Free transfer
Pre-season	FW	(Japan) Hayate Take	(Japan) Blaublitz Akita	Loan transfer

Transfers out
Leave on	Pos.	Player	Moving to	Transfer type
Pre-season	GK	(Japan) Genta Ito	(Japan) Vissel Kobe	Loan expiration
Pre-season	DF	(Japan) Masaya Kojima	(Japan) Zweigen Kanazawa	Full transfer
Pre-season	DF	(Japan) So Hirao	(Japan) MIO Biwako Shiga	Free transfer
Pre-season	DF	(Japan) Hayato Abe	(Japan) Tiamo Hirakata	Free transfer
Pre-season	DF	(Japan) Yuya Takagi	(Japan) Yokohama FC	Loan expiration
Pre-season	DF	(Japan) Yuta Fujii	–	Contract expiration
Pre-season	MF	(Japan) Junya Kato	(Japan) Zweigen Kanazawa	Full transfer
Pre-season	MF	(Japan) Toshiya Tanaka	(Japan) Renofa Yamaguchi	Full transfer
Pre-season	MF	(Japan) Yuto Nakayama	(Japan) Criacao Shinjuku	Full transfer
Pre-season	MF	(Japan) Shumpei Fukahori	(Japan) Ehime FC	Loan transfer
Pre-season	MF	(Japan) Kazune Kubota	(Japan) FC Gifu	Loan transfer
Pre-season	FW	(Japan) Kohei Shin	(Japan) Nagano Parceiro	Free transfer
Pre-season	FW	(Japan) Ryuichi Ichiki	(Japan) Okinawa SV	Free transfer
Pre-season	FW	(Japan) Kodai Watanabe	(Japan) Vonds Ichihara	Free transfer
Pre-season	FW	(Japan) Yuya Mitsunaga	(Japan) Shinagawa CC	Free transfer
Pre-season	FW	(Japan) Kunitomo Suzuki	(Japan) Matsumoto Yamaga	Loan expiration

== Tochigi SC ==
Transfers in
Join on	Pos.	Player	Moving from	Transfer type
Pre-season	DF	(Japan) Ryohei Okazaki	(Japan) FC Ryukyu	Full transfer
Pre-season	DF	(Japan) Wataru Hiramatsu	(Japan) Rissho University	Free transfer
Pre-season	DF	(Japan) Shuya Takashima	(Japan) Hosei University	Free transfer
Pre-season	DF	(Japan) Hayato Fukushima	(Japan) Shonan Bellmare	Loan transfer
Pre-season	DF	(Japan) Kenya Onodera	(Japan) Kagoshima United	Loan return
Pre-season	DF	(Japan) Yukuto Omoya	(Japan) SC Sagamihara	Loan return
Pre-season	MF	(Japan) Yojiro Takahagi	(Japan) FC Tokyo	Free transfer
Pre-season	MF	(Japan) Yuto Yamada	(Japan) Kashiwa Reysol	Loan transfer
Pre-season	MF	(Japan) Kojiro Yasuda	(Japan) FC Tokyo	Loan transfer

Transfers out
Leave on	Pos.	Player	Moving to	Transfer type
Pre-season	DF	(Spain) Carlos Gutiérrez	(Japan) Machida Zelvia	Full transfer
Pre-season	DF	(Japan) Keita Ide	(Japan) MIO Biwako Shiga	Free transfer
Pre-season	DF	(Japan) Kaito Suzuki	(Japan) Júbilo Iwata	Loan expiration
Pre-season	MF	(Japan) Teppei Yachida	(Japan) Kyoto Sanga	Loan expiration
Pre-season	MF	(Japan) Ryota Isomura	–	Retirement
Pre-season	FW	(Japan) Rimu Matsuoka	(Japan) Roasso Kumamoto	Full transfer

== Tokushima Vortis ==
Transfers in
Join on	Pos.	Player	Moving from	Transfer type
Pre-season	GK	(Japan) Naoki Goto	(Japan) Tochigi City	Loan return
Pre-season	DF	(Panama) Luismi Quezada	(Uzbekistan) Surkhon Termez	Free transfer
Pre-season	DF	(Japan) Towa Nishisaka	(Japan) Riseisha HS	Free transfer
Pre-season	DF	(Japan) Noriki Fuke	(Japan) FC Imabari	Loan return
Pre-season	MF	(Japan) Keita Nakano	(Japan) Kyoto Sanga	Full transfer
Pre-season	MF	(Japan) Ryo Toyama	(Japan) Matsumoto Yamaga	Full transfer
Pre-season	MF	(Japan) Yudai Yamashita	(Japan) Waseda University	Free transfer
Pre-season	MF	(Japan) Soya Takada	(Japan) Omiya Ardija	Loan transfer
Pre-season	FW	(Japan) Daiki Watari	(Japan) Avispa Fukuoka	Full transfer
Pre-season	FW	(Japan) Yoichiro Kakitani	(Japan) Nagoya Grampus	Full transfer
Pre-season	FW	(Japan) Akito Tanahashi	(Japan) Kokushikan University	Free transfer
Pre-season	FW	(Japan) Kaito Mori	(Japan) Kashiwa Reysol	Loan transfer
Pre-season	FW	(Japan) Kanta Chiba	(Japan) Shimizu S-Pulse	Loan transfer

Transfers out
Leave on	Pos.	Player	Moving to	Transfer type
9 Mar	GK	(Japan) Koki Matsuzawa	(Japan) Vegalta Sendai	Loan transfer
Pre-season	DF	(Japan) Daisei Suzuki	(Japan) Nara Club	Free transfer
Pre-season	DF	(Japan) Yudai Okuda	(Japan) Kamatamare Sanuki	Free transfer
Pre-season	DF	(Japan) Naoto Arai	(Japan) Cerezo Osaka	Loan transfer
Pre-season	MF	(Japan) Chie Edoojon Kawakami	(Japan) Thespakusatsu Gunma	Full transfer
Pre-season	MF	(Japan) Ken Iwao	(Japan) Urawa Red Diamonds	Full transfer; Loan made permanent
Pre-season	MF	(Japan) Rin Morita	(Japan) FC Ryukyu	Loan transfer
Pre-season	MF	(Japan) Seiya Fujita	–	Retirement
Pre-season	FW	(Norway) Mushaga Bakenga	(Norway) Stabæk	Free transfer
Pre-season	FW	(Japan) Kazunari Ichimi	(Japan) Kyoto Sanga	Full transfer
Pre-season	FW	(Japan) Taichi Takeda	(Japan) FC Osaka	Full transfer; Loan made permanent
Pre-season	FW	(Japan) Shiryu Fujiwara	(Japan) FC Ryukyu	Loan transfer
Pre-season	FW	(Japan) Shota Fujio	(Japan) Cerezo Osaka	Loan expiration
Pre-season	FW	(Japan) Akihiro Sato	–	Retired

== Tokyo Verdy ==
Transfers in
Join on	Pos.	Player	Moving from	Transfer type
Pre-season	GK	(Japan) Masahiro Iida	(Japan) Kokushikan University	Full transfer
Pre-season	DF	(Japan) Kazuya Miyahara	(Japan) Nagoya Grampus	Full transfer
Pre-season	DF	(Japan) Kaito Chida	(Japan) Blaublitz Akita	Full transfer
Pre-season	DF	(Japan) Naoki Hayashi	(Japan) Kashima Antlers	Loan transfer
Pre-season	MF	(Japan) Kosuke Saito	(Japan) Yokohama FC	Full transfer
Pre-season	MF	(Japan) Daiki Kusunoki	(Japan) Toin University of Yokohama	Free transfer
Pre-season	MF	(Japan) Yuto Tsunashima	(Japan) Kokushikan University	Free transfer
Pre-season	MF	(Japan) Yuji Kitajima	(Japan) Avispa Fukuoka	Loan transfer
Pre-season	FW	(Germany) Mario Engels	(Netherlands) Sparta Rotterdam	Free transfer
Pre-season	FW	(Japan) Kosuke Sagawa	(Japan) Tokyo International University	Free transfer
Pre-season	FW	(Japan) Goki Yamada	(Japan) Kwansei Gakuin University	Free transfer

Transfers out
Leave on	Pos.	Player	Moving to	Transfer type
Pre-season	GK	(Japan) Toru Takagiwa	(Japan) Iwaki FC	Loan transfer
Pre-season	DF	(Japan) Seiya Baba	(Japan) Consadole Sapporo	Full transfer
Pre-season	DF	(Japan) Boniface Nduka	(Japan) Yokohama FC	Full transfer
Pre-season	DF	(Japan) Tatsuya Yamaguchi	(Japan) Ehime FC	Full transfer
Pre-season	DF	(Japan) Maaya Sako	(Japan) Nagano Parceiro	Loan transfer
Pre-season	DF	(Japan) Yu Miyamoto	(Japan) Kochi United	Loan transfer
Pre-season	MF	(Japan) Haruya Ide	(Japan) Vissel Kobe	Full transfer
Pre-season	MF	(Japan) Mizuki Arai	(Japan) Yokohama FC	Full transfer
Pre-season	MF	(Japan) Kyota Mochii	(Japan) Azul Claro Numazu	Loan transfer
Pre-season	MF	(Japan) Taiga Ishiura	(Japan) Ehime FC	Loan transfer
Pre-season	FW	(Japan) Ryoga Sato	(Japan) Avispa Fukuoka	Full transfer
Pre-season	FW	(Japan) Jin Hanato	(Japan) Kagoshima United	Free transfer
Pre-season	FW	(Japan) Yuan Matsuhashi	(Japan) Renofa Yamaguchi	Loan transfer
Pre-season	FW	(Japan) Itsuki Someno	(Japan) Kashima Antlers	Loan expiration

== Vegalta Sendai ==
Transfers in
Join on	Pos.	Player	Moving from	Transfer type
10 Mar	MF	(Japan) Rikuto Ishio	(Japan) Sendai University	Loan transfer; 2023 DSP
9 Mar	GK	(Japan) Koki Matsuzawa	(Japan) Tokushima Vortis	Loan transfer
Pre-season	GK	(Japan) Akihiro Hayashi	(Japan) FC Tokyo	Full transfer
Pre-season	GK	(Japan) Riku Umeda	(Japan) Osaka Gakuin University	Free transfer
Pre-season	DF	(Japan) Yuta Koide	(Japan) Oita Trinita	Full transfer
Pre-season	DF	(Japan) Masahiro Sugata	(Japan) Roasso Kumamoto	Full transfer
Pre-season	MF	(Japan) Yuta Goke	(Japan) Vissel Kobe	Full transfer
Pre-season	MF	(Japan) Aoi Kudo	(Japan) Hannan University	Free transfer
Pre-season	MF	(Japan) Ryunosuke Sagara	(Japan) Sagan Tosu	Loan transfer
Pre-season	MF	(Japan) Yosuke Akiyama	(Japan) JEF United Chiba	Loan return
Pre-season	MF	(Brazil) Ewerton	(Portugal) Portimonense SC	Loan transfer
Pre-season	FW	(Japan) Hiroto Yamada	(Japan) Cerezo Osaka	Loan transfer
Pre-season	FW	(South Korea) Heo Yong-joon	(South Korea) Pohang Steelers	Loan transfer
Pre-season	FW	(Japan) George Onaiwu	(Japan) Niigata University UHW	Free transfer
Pre-season	FW	(Japan) Ryunosuke Sugawara	(Japan) Sanno University	Free transfer

Transfers out
Leave on	Pos.	Player	Moving to	Transfer type
12 Mar	GK	(Japan) Daichi Sugimoto	(Japan) Nagoya Grampus	Full transfer
Pre-season	GK	(Serbia) Nedeljko Stojišić	(Japan) Machida Zelvia	Full transfer
Pre-season	GK	(Japan) Kaito Ioka	(Japan) Gainare Tottori	Full transfer
Pre-season	DF	(Japan) Wataru Tanaka	(Japan) Montedio Yamagata	Full transfer
Pre-season	DF	(Japan) Kyohei Yoshino	(Japan) Yokohama FC	Full transfer
Pre-season	DF	(Japan) Yasuhiro Hiraoka	(Japan) Ehime FC	Full transfer
Pre-season	DF	(Japan) Hayato Teruyama	(Japan) FC Imabari	Full transfer; Loan made permanent
Pre-season	DF	(Japan) Yota Sato	(Japan) Gamba Osaka	Loan expiration
Pre-season	MF	(Japan) Takayoshi Ishihara	(Japan) Zweigen Kanazawa	Full transfer
Pre-season	MF	(Japan) Kota Osone	(Japan) Fujieda MYFC	Loan transfer
Pre-season	MF	(Japan) Takumi Nagura	(Japan) V-Varen Nagasaki	Loan transfer
Pre-season	MF	(Argentina) Leandro Desábato	–	Contract expiration
Pre-season	MF	(Japan) Shingo Tomita	–	Retirement
Pre-season	FW	(Japan) Cayman Togashi	(Japan) Sagan Tosu	Full transfer
Pre-season	FW	(Japan) Yusuke Minagawa	(Japan) Renofa Yamaguchi	Full transfer
Pre-season	FW	(Brazil) Felippe Cardoso	(Brazil) Santos FC	Loan expiration

== Ventforet Kofu ==
Transfers in
Join on	Pos.	Player	Moving from	Transfer type
Pre-season	GK	(Japan) Hiroki Shibuya	(Japan) Nagoya Grampus	Free transfer
Pre-season	DF	(Japan) Shion Inoue	(Japan) Senshu University	Free transfer
Pre-season	DF	(Japan) Sota Miura	(Japan) Nippon SS University	Free transfer
Pre-season	DF	(Japan) Sodai Hasukawa	(Japan) FC Tokyo	Loan transfer
Pre-season	DF	(Japan) Kaito Kamiya	(Japan) Kawasaki Frontale	Loan transfer
Pre-season	MF	(Japan) Kosuke Taketomi	(Japan) Kyoto Sanga	Free transfer
Pre-season	MF	(Japan) Kazuhito Sato	(Japan) Matsumoto Yamaga	Full transfer
Pre-season	MF	(Japan) Hikaru Endo	(Japan) Senshu University	Free transfer
Pre-season	MF	(Japan) Manato Shinada	(Japan) FC Tokyo	Loan transfer
Pre-season	MF	(Japan) Kodai Dohi	(Japan) Sanfrecce Hiroshima	Loan transfer
Pre-season	MF	(Japan) Riku Nakayama	(Japan) Matsumoto Yamaga	Loan return
Pre-season	FW	(Nigeria) Peter Utaka	(Japan) Kyoto Sanga	Free transfer
Pre-season	FW	(Japan) Kohei Matsumoto	(Japan) Kamatamare Sanuki	Full transfer
Pre-season	FW	(Japan) Hayata Mizuno	(Japan) Toin University of Yokohama	Free transfer

Transfers out
Leave on	Pos.	Player	Moving to	Transfer type
Pre-season	GK	(Japan) Kosuke Okanishi	(Japan) Fujieda MYFC	Full transfer
Pre-season	GK	(Japan) Yuto Koizumi	–	Retirement
Pre-season	DF	(Brazil) Renato	(Brazil) Pouso Alegre	Free transfer
Pre-season	DF	(Japan) Niki Urakawa	(Japan) Omiya Ardija	Full transfer
Pre-season	DF	(Brazil) Foguete	–	Contract expiration
Pre-season	DF	(Japan) Fumitaka Kitatani	–	Retirement
Pre-season	MF	(Japan) Riku Yamada	(Japan) Nagoya Grampus	Full transfer
Pre-season	MF	(Japan) Toshiki Ishikawa	(Japan) Omiya Ardija	Loan expiration
Pre-season	MF	(Japan) Shusuke Yonehara	(Japan) Matsumoto Yamaga	Loan expiration
Pre-season	MF	(Japan) Hideyuki Nozawa	–	Retirement
Pre-season	FW	(Brazil) Willian Lira	(Malaysia) Kedah Darul Am'an	Free transfer
Pre-season	FW	(Brazil) Igor Sartori	(Hong Kong) Kitchee FC	Free transfer

== V-Varen Nagasaki ==
Transfers in
Join on	Pos.	Player	Moving from	Transfer type
10 Mar	GK	(Serbia) Luka Radotic	(Serbia) OFK Beograd	Free transfer
Pre-season	GK	(Japan) Go Hatano	(Japan) FC Tokyo	Loan transfer
Pre-season	DF	(Japan) Yuta Imazu	(Japan) Sanfrecce Hiroshima	Full transfer
Pre-season	DF	(Japan) Jun Okano	(Japan) Machida Zelvia	Full transfer
Pre-season	DF	(Brazil) Valdo	(Japan) Shimizu S-Pulse	Full transfer
Pre-season	DF	(Japan) Haruki Shirai	(Japan) Hosei University	Free transfer
Pre-season	MF	(Japan) Asahi Masuyama	(Japan) Oita Trinita	Full transfer
Pre-season	MF	(Japan) Gijo Sehata	(Japan) Toyo University	Free transfer
Pre-season	MF	(Japan) Raiju Obuchi	(Japan) Higashi Fukuoka HS	Free transfer
Pre-season	MF	(Japan) Takumi Nagura	(Japan) Vegalta Sendai	Loan return
Pre-season	FW	(Spain) Juanma	(Japan) Avispa Fukuoka	Full transfer
Pre-season	FW	(Japan) Ten Miyagi	(Japan) Kawasaki Frontale	Loan transfer
Pre-season	FW	(Japan) Serigne Saliou Diop	(Japan) Nagoya Sangyo University	Loan transfer; 2023 DSP

Transfers out
Leave on	Pos.	Player	Moving to	Transfer type
Pre-season	GK	(Japan) Suguru Asanuma	(Japan) Criacao Shinjuku	Free transfer
Pre-season	GK	(Japan) Takashi Kasahara	(Japan) Omiya Ardija	Loan expiration
Pre-season	DF	(Japan) Yusei Egawa	(Japan) Gamba Osaka	Full transfer
Pre-season	DF	(Japan) Hiroshi Futami	(Japan) FC Imabari	Full transfer
Pre-season	DF	(Japan) Kota Muramatsu	(Japan) Giravanz Kitakyushu	Loan transfer
Pre-season	DF	(Japan) Shuta Kikuchi	(Japan) Shimizu S-Pulse	Loan expiration
Pre-season	FW	(Japan) Asahi Uenaka	(Japan) Yokohama F. Marinos	Full transfer
Pre-season	FW	(Japan) Ryohei Yamazaki	(Japan) Tegevajaro Miyazaki	Full transfer
Pre-season	FW	(Japan) Koya Okuda	(Japan) Zweigen Kanazawa	Loan transfer
Pre-season	FW	(Colombia) Victor Ibarbo	–	Contract expiration

== Zweigen Kanazawa ==
Transfers in
Join on	Pos.	Player	Moving from	Transfer type
Pre-season	GK	(Japan) Kojiro Nakano	(Japan) Consadole Sapporo	Loan transfer
Pre-season	DF	(Brazil) Léo Bahia	(Portugal) UD Vilafranquense	Free transfer
Pre-season	DF	(Japan) Masaya Kojima	(Japan) Thespakusatsu Gunma	Full transfer
Pre-season	DF	(Japan) Ryota Inoue	(Japan) Rissho University	Free transfer
Pre-season	DF	(Japan) Fuga Sakurai	(Japan) Meiji University	Free transfer
Pre-season	DF	(South Korea) Park Jun-seo	(South Korea) Daejeon Hana Citizen	Loan transfer
Pre-season	MF	(Brazil) Jefferson Baiano	(Brazil) Arraial do Cabo	Full transfer
Pre-season	MF	(Japan) Junya Kato	(Japan) Thespakusatsu Gunma	Full transfer
Pre-season	MF	(Japan) Takayoshi Ishihara	(Japan) Vegalta Sendai	Full transfer
Pre-season	MF	(Japan) Yuki Kajiura	(Japan) FC Tokyo	Loan transfer
Pre-season	FW	(Japan) Koya Okuda	(Japan) V-Varen Nagasaki	Loan transfer

Transfers out
Leave on	Pos.	Player	Moving to	Transfer type
Pre-season	GK	(Japan) Ryo Ishii	(Japan) Wyvern FC	Free transfer
22 Feb	GK	(Japan) Itsuki Ueda	(Japan) Kochi United	Loan transfer
Pre-season	DF	(Japan) Riku Matsuda	(Japan) JEF United Chiba	Full transfer
Pre-season	DF	(Japan) Takayuki Takayasu	(Japan) FC Ryukyu	Free transfer
Pre-season	DF	(Japan) Yosuke Toji	(Japan) ReinMeer Aomori	Free transfer
Pre-season	DF	(Japan) Seiya Katakura	(Japan) Aventura Kawaguchi	Free transfer
Pre-season	DF	(Japan) Gaku Inaba	(Japan) ReinMeer Aomori	Loan transfer
Pre-season	DF	(Japan) Daisuke Matsumoto	(Japan) Sagan Tosu	Loan expiration
Pre-season	DF	(Japan) Tomonobu Hiroi	–	Retirement
Pre-season	MF	(Japan) Hiroya Matsumoto	(Japan) Sanfrecce Hiroshima	Loan expiration
Pre-season	MF	(Japan) Megumu Nishida	(Japan) Nara Club	Free transfer
Pre-season	MF	(Japan) Raisei Shimazu	(Japan) Tiamo Hirakata	Free transfer
Pre-season	MF	(Japan) Ryo Kubota	(Japan) FC Gifu	Free transfer
Pre-season	MF	(Japan) Dai Tsukamoto	(Japan) Gamba Osaka	Loan expiration
Pre-season	MF	(Japan) Naoki Suto	(Japan) Kashima Antlers	Loan expiration
Pre-season	MF	(Japan) Sho Hiramatsu	(Japan) Shonan Bellmare	Loan expiration
Pre-season	FW	(Japan) Rikito Sugiura	(Japan) Tegevajaro Miyazaki	Full transfer
Pre-season	FW	(Japan) Shion Niwa	(Japan) Blaublitz Akita	Loan transfer

== See also ==
- List of J1 League football transfers winter 2022–23
- List of J3 League football transfers winter 2022–23
- List of Japan Football League football transfers winter 2022–23
