= Ryūhei =

- Gender: Male

Origin
- Origin: Japanese
- Meaning: Different meanings depending on the kanji used

Ryūhei, Ryuhei or Ryuuhei (written: 龍平, 隆平 or 竜平) is a masculine Japanese given name. Notable people with the name include:

- Ryuhei Kawada (川田 龍平; born 1976), Japanese politician and activist
- Ryuhei Kitamura (北村 龍平; born 1969), Japanese film director
- Ryuhei Maruyama (丸山 隆平; born 1983), Japanese singer
- Ryuhei Matsuda (松田 龍平; born 1983), Japanese actor
- Ryuhei Niwa (丹羽 竜平; born 1986), Japanese footballer
- Ryuhei Oishi (大石 竜平; born 1997), Japanese footballer
- Ryūhei Tamura (田村 隆平; born 1980), Japanese manga artist
- Ryuhei Ueshima (上島 竜兵; born 1961), Japanese comedian
