= Motoaki Miura =

Japanese footballer

Motoaki Miura 三浦 基瑛
Personal information
- Full name: Motoaki Miura
- Date of birth: 28 May 1996 (age 30)
- Place of birth: Nonoichi, Ishikawa, Japan
- Height: 1.86 m (6 ft 1 in)
- Position: Goalkeeper

Team information
- Current team: SC Sagamihara
- Number: 1

Youth career
- –2011: Geminis Kanazawa FC
- 2012–2014: Yugakkan High School

College career
Years	Team	Apps	(Gls)
2015–2018	Takushoku University		

Senior career*
Years	Team	Apps	(Gls)
2019–2021	SC Sagamihara	22	(0)
2022–2023	Zweigen Kanazawa	3	(0)
2024–	SC Sagamihara	52	(0)
- * Club domestic league appearances and goals as of 17 August 2026

Motoaki Miura (三浦 基瑛, Miura Motoaki; born May 28, 1996) is a Japanese professional footballer who playing as a goalkeeper and currently play for J3 League club, SC Sagamihara.

== Early life ==
Motoaki was born in Nonoichi. He played for Geminis Kanazawa FC, Yugakkan High School and Takushoku University's youth teams.

== Career ==
Motoaki made his debut for Sagamihara against Thespakusatsu Gunma on 7 March 2021.

He made his debut for Zweigen against Oita Trinita on 18 September 2022.

== Career statistics ==
=== Club ===
As of the start for 2025 season.

Club	Season	League			National Cup		League Cup		Other		Total	
Club	Season	Division	Apps	Goals	Apps	Goals	Apps	Goals	Apps	Goals	Apps	Goals
SC Sagamihara	2019	J3 League	0	0	0	0	–		0	0	0	0
SC Sagamihara	2020	J3 League	0	0	0	0	–		0	0	0	0
SC Sagamihara	2021	J2 League	22	0	2	0	0	0	0	0	24	0
Zweigen Kanazawa	2022	J2 League	1	0	2	0	–		0	0	3	0
Zweigen Kanazawa	2023	J2 League	2	0	0	0	–		0	0	2	0
SC Sagamihara	2024	J3 League	38	0	1	0	–		0	0	39	0
SC Sagamihara	2025	J3 League	0	0	0	0	0	0	0	0	0	0
Career total			63	0	5	0	0	0	0	0	68	0
