= Masamichi Hayashi =

Japanese footballer (born 1996)

Masamichi Hayashi 林 誠道
Personal information
- Full name: Masamichi Hayashi
- Date of birth: 4 April 1996 (age 30)
- Place of birth: Hyōgo, Japan
- Height: 1.77 m (5 ft 10 in)
- Position: Forward

Team information
- Current team: FC Imabari (on loan from JEF United Chiba)
- Number: 44

Youth career
- –2011: Nagasu SC
- 2012–2014: Osaka Sangyo University High School

Senior career*
Years	Team	Apps	(Gls)
2015–2019	Gainare Tottori	103	(12)
2020	FC Imabari	31	(8)
2021	Montedio Yamagata	36	(6)
2022–2023	Zweigen Kanazawa	77	(20)
2024–	JEF United Chiba	16	(0)
2025	→ Matsumoto Yamaga (loan)	16	(4)
2026–	→ FC Imabari (loan)	20	(1)
- * Club domestic league appearances and goals as of 17 August 2026

Masamichi Hayashi (林 誠道, Hayashi Masamichi; born 4 April 1996) is a Japanese footballer who plays for J2 League club FC Imabari, on loan from JEF United Chiba.

== Career ==
On 16 January 2015, Hayashi was announced at Gainare Tottori. On 12 September 2019, Hayashi won the J3 Best Goal of the Month award for August 2019, for his goal against FC Tokyo U-23. He won the J3 MVP of the Month award in October 2019. He finished the 2019 season with 11 goals.

After five seasons in Tottori, Hayashi signed with newly-promoted FC Imabari in January 2020. He made his league debut against FC Gifu on 27 June 2020. Hayashi scored his first league goal against Kagoshima United on 11 July 2020, scoring in the 85th minute.

On 25 December 2020, Hayashi was announced at Montedio Yamagata. He made his league debut against Machida Zelvia on 28 February 2021. Hayashi scored his first league goal against Thespa Gunma on 1 May 2021, scoring in the 48th minute.

On 30 December 2021, Hayashi was announced at Zweigen Kanazawa. He made his league debut against Tokushima Vortis on 19 February 2022. Hayashi scored his first league goal against Machida Zelvia on 6 March 2022, scoring in the 21st minute.

On 30 December 2023, Hayashi was announced at JEF United Chiba. He made his league debut against Blaublitz Akita on 21 April 2024. On 30 December 2024, his contract with the club was extended for the 2025 season.

== Club statistics ==
As of 13 April 2026.

Appearances and goals by club, season and competition
Club	Season	League			National cup (Note: Includes Emperors Cup)		Total	
Club	Season	Division	Apps	Goals	Apps	Goals	Apps	Goals
Gainare Tottori	2015	J3 League	27	1	2	0	29	1
Gainare Tottori	2016	J3 League	17	0	2	1	19	1
Gainare Tottori	2017	J3 League	19	0	1	0	20	0
Gainare Tottori	2018	J3 League	14	0	0	0	14	0
Gainare Tottori	2019	J3 League	26	11	2	0	28	11
Gainare Tottori	Total		103	12	7	1	110	13
FC Imabari	2020	J3 League	31	8	–		31	8
Montedio Yamagata	2021	J2 League	36	6	1	0	37	6
Zweigen Kanazawa	2022	J2 League	42	13	1	0	43	13
Zweigen Kanazawa	2023	J2 League	35	7	1	0	36	7
Zweigen Kanazawa	Total		77	20	2	0	79	20
JEF United Chiba	2024	J2 League	16	0	3	1	19	1
JEF United Chiba	2025	J2 League	16	0	1	0	17	0
JEF United Chiba	Total		32	0	4	1	36	1
Matsumoto Yamaga (loan)	2025	J3 League	16	4	–		16	4
FC Imabari (loan)	2026	J2/J3 (100)	10	1	–		10	1
Career total			305	51	14	2	319	53
