= Junya Kato =

Japanese footballer

Junya Kato 加藤 潤也
Personal information
- Full name: Junya Kato
- Date of birth: December 30, 1994 (age 31)
- Place of birth: Hiroshima, Japan
- Height: 1.64 m (5 ft 5 in)
- Position: Forward

Team information
- Current team: FC Imabari
- Number: 77

Youth career
- 2010–2012: Yonago Kita High School

College career
Years	Team	Apps	(Gls)
2013–2016	Josai International University		

Senior career*
Years	Team	Apps	(Gls)
2017–2018	Gainare Tottori	32	(11)
2018–2022	Thespakusatsu Gunma	125	(18)
2023	Zweigen Kanazawa	39	(9)
2024	Renofa Yamaguchi	8	(0)
2024–	FC Imabari	36	(2)
- * Club domestic league appearances and goals as of 17 August 2026

Junya Kato (加藤 潤也, Katō Jun'ya; born December 30, 1994) is a Japanese football player who currently plays for FC Imabari.

== Career ==
=== Gainare Tottori ===
Junya Kato joined J3 League club Gainare Tottori in 2017.

=== Thespakusatsu Gunma ===
On 21 December 2018, Kato was announced at Thespakusatsu Gunma. He scored on his league debut against SC Sagamihara on 17 March 2019, scoring in the 86th and 90th+1st minute.

=== Zweigen Kanazawa ===
On 31 December 2022, Kato was announced at Zweigen Kanazawa. He made his league debut against Tokyo Verdy on 19 February 2023. Kato scored his first league goal against Renofa Yamaguchi on 19 March 2023, scoring in the 75th minute.

=== Renofa Yamaguchi ===
On 26 December 2023, Kato was announced at Renofa Yamaguchi. He made his league debut against Blaublitz Akita on 3 March 2024.

=== FC Imabari ===
On 24 June 2024, Kato was announced at FC Imabari. He made his league debut against Zweigen Kanazawa on 14 July 2024. Kato scored his first league goal against FC Osaka on 17 August 2024, scoring in the 56th minute.

== Career statistics ==
Updated to 22 March 2018.

Appearances and goals by club, season and competition
Club	Season	League			Emperor's Cup		Total	
Club	Season	Division	Apps	Goals	Apps	Goals	Apps	Goals
Gainare Tottori	2017	J3 League	32	11	0	0	32	11
Career total			32	11	0	0	32	11
