= Shogo Rikiyasu =

Japanese footballer

Personal information
- Date of birth: 22 August 1998 (age 28)
- Place of birth: Hiroshima, Japan
- Height: 1.74 m (5 ft 9 in)
- Position: Midfielder

Team information
- Current team: Matsumoto Yamaga FC
- Number: 14

Youth career
- USFC Hara SC
- –2016: Sanfrecce Hiroshima

College career
Years	Team	Apps	(Gls)
2017–2020	Meiji University		

Senior career*
Years	Team	Apps	(Gls)
2021–2022	Zweigen Kanazawa	55	(0)
2023–2026	Tegevajaro Miyazaki	74	(4)
2026–	Matsumoto Yamaga FC	1	(0)
- * Club domestic league appearances and goals as of 24 August 2026

Shogo Rikiyasu (力安 祥伍, Rikiyasu Shogo; born 22 August 1998) is a Japanese footballer currently playing as a midfielder for Matsumoto Yamaga FC.

== Career statistics ==
=== Club ===
As of 3 March 2021.

Club	Season	League			National Cup		League Cup		Other		Total	
Club	Season	Division	Apps	Goals	Apps	Goals	Apps	Goals	Apps	Goals	Apps	Goals
Meiji University	2019	–			1 (Note: Appearances in the Emperor's Cup)	0	–		0	0	1	0
Zweigen Kanazawa	2021	J2 League	1	0	0	0	0	0	0	0	1	0
Career total			1	0	1	0	0	0	0	0	2	0
