= Masaya Kojima =

Japanese footballer (born 1997)

Masaya Kojima 小島 雅也
Personal information
- Full name: Masaya Kojima
- Date of birth: November 9, 1997 (age 29)
- Place of birth: Gyōda, Saitama, Japan
- Height: 1.70 m (5 ft 7 in)
- Position: Centre back

Team information
- Current team: FC Osaka
- Number: 52

Youth career
- 2013–2015: Vegalta Sendai

Senior career*
Years	Team	Apps	(Gls)
2016–2019	Vegalta Sendai	3	(0)
2018	→ Machida Zelvia (loan)	10	(0)
2019	→ Zweigen Kanazawa (loan)	14	(0)
2020–2022	Thespakusatsu Gunma	93	(3)
2023–2026	Zweigen Kanazawa	110	(7)
2026–	FC Osaka	2	(0)
- * Club domestic league appearances and goals as of 18 August 2026

Masaya Kojima (小島 雅也, Kojima Masaya; born November 9, 1997) is a Japanese football player. He plays for FC Osaka from 2026.

== Career ==
On 26 December 2022, Kojima announcement officially transfer return to former club, Zweigen Kanazawa as permanent for upcoming 2023 season.

== Career statistics ==
Updated to the end of 2022 season.

Appearances and goals by club, season and competition
Club	Season	League			Emperor's Cup		J. League Cup		Total	
Club	Season	Division	Apps	Goals	Apps	Goals	Apps	Goals	Apps	Goals
Vegalta Sendai	2016	J1 League	2	0	0	0	1	0	3	0
Vegalta Sendai	2017	J1 League	1	0	0	0	4	0	5	0
Machida Zelvia (loan)	2018	J2 League	10	0	0	0	-		10	0
Zweigen Kanazawa (loan)	2019	J2 League	14	0	2	0	-		16	0
Thespakusatsu Gunma	2020	J2 League	31	1	0	0	-		30	1
Thespakusatsu Gunma	2021	J2 League	21	0	2	0	-		23	0
Thespakusatsu Gunma	2022	J2 League	42	2	0	0	-		42	2
Zweigen Kanazawa	2023	J2 League	0	0	0	0	-		0	0
Career total			120	3	4	0	5	0	129	3
