= Shunya Mori =

Japanese footballer

Shunya Mori 毛利駿也
Personal information
- Full name: Shunya Mori
- Date of birth: April 10, 1995 (age 31)
- Place of birth: Hakusan, Ishikawa, Japan
- Height: 1.75 m (5 ft 9 in)
- Positions: Right back; left back

Team information
- Current team: Zweigen Kanazawa
- Number: 16

Youth career
- –2010: Square Toyama
- 2011–2013: Yamanashi Gakuin High School

College career
Years	Team	Apps	(Gls)
2014–2017	Juntendo University		

Senior career*
Years	Team	Apps	(Gls)
2018–2019	Zweigen Kanazawa	55	(1)
2019–2021	Shonan Bellmare	1	(0)
2022–	Zweigen Kanazawa	78	(2)
- * Club domestic league appearances and goals as of 21 August 2026

Shunya Mori (毛利 駿也, Mōri Shun'ya; born April 10, 1995) is a Japanese football player for Zweigen Kanazawa.

== Career ==
After attending Juntendo University, Mori joined Zweigen Kanazawa and debuted against Omiya Ardija.

== Career statistics ==
Updated to 8 July 2019.

Appearances and goals by club, season and competition
Club	Season	League			Emperor's Cup		Total	
Club	Season	Division	Apps	Goals	Apps	Goals	Apps	Goals
Zweigen Kanazawa	2018	J2 League	38	1	2	0	40	1
Zweigen Kanazawa	2019	J2 League	17	0	0	0	17	0
Career total			55	1	2	0	57	1
