= Koya Okuda =

Japanese footballer (born 1994)

Koya Okuda 奥田 晃也
Personal information
- Full name: Koya Okuda
- Date of birth: October 1, 1994 (age 32)
- Place of birth: Wakayama, Japan
- Height: 1.81 m (5 ft 11 1/2 in)
- Position: Midfielder

Team information
- Current team: Fukushima United FC
- Number: 44

Youth career
- Misaki SSS
- –2009: Misaki Almabola
- 2010–2012: Albirex Niigata

College career
Years	Team	Apps	(Gls)
2013–2016	Kanagawa University		

Senior career*
Years	Team	Apps	(Gls)
2017–2019	YSCC Yokohama	89	(14)
2020–2021	Mito HollyHock	74	(10)
2022–2023	V-Varen Nagasaki	16	(2)
2023-2024	→ Zweigen Kanazawa (loan)	39	(5)
2024	Tochigi SC	33	(2)
2025–2026	Mito HollyHock	32	(2)
2026–	Fukushima United FC	3	(0)
- * Club domestic league appearances and goals as of 25 August 2026

Koya Okuda (奥田 晃也, Okuda Koya; born October 1, 1994) is a Japanese football player. He plays for Fukushima United FC from 2026.

== Career ==
Koya Okuda joined J3 League club YSCC Yokohama in 2017.

On 7 January 2022, Okuda joined to J2 club, V-Varen Nagasaki.

On 27 December at same year, Okuda was loaned to Zweigen Kanazawa for upcoming 2023 season.

== Club statistics ==
Updated to 2 January 2020.

Club performance			League		Cup		Total	
Season	Club	League	Apps	Goals	Apps	Goals	Apps	Goals
Japan			League		Emperor's Cup		Total	
2017	YSCC Yokohama	J3 League	26	4	1	0	27	4
2018	YSCC Yokohama	J3 League	30	4	2	1	32	5
2019	YSCC Yokohama	J3 League	33	6	0	0	33	6
Total			89	14	3	1	92	15
