= Léo Bahia =

Brazilian footballer (born 1994)

Personal information
- Full name: Leonardo Alves São Pedro de Jesus
- Date of birth: 4 November 1994 (age 32)
- Place of birth: Bahia, Brazil
- Height: 1.72 m (5 ft 8 in)
- Position: Left-back

Senior career*
Years	Team	Apps	(Gls)
2014–2018	Audax	36	(0)
2015–2016	→ Oeste (loan)	5	(0)
2017	→ Bangu	0	(0)
2020	Tonan Maebashi		
2020–2021	Oliveirense	27	(1)
2021–2022	Vilafranquense	26	(1)
2023	Zweigen Kanazawa	17	(1)
2024–2025	Yokohama	1	(0)
- * Club domestic league appearances and goals as of 30 March 2015

Leonardo Alves São Pedro de Jesus (born 4 November 1994), commonly known as Léo Bahia, is a Brazilian professional footballer who plays as a left-back.

== Club career ==
Bahia joined the Copa Paulista with Audax in 2013, but was not involved. On 2 August of the following year, he recorded his first appearance at the same tournament. In 2015, he made his first league appearance at Campeonato Paulista. In the summer of the same year, he was loaned to Oeste, and made his first appearance in the national league in Campeonato, Brasileiro and Serie B. In 2017, he transferred to Bangu on a loan until the summer. He left Audax in November 2018.

The following year, Bahia was unaffiliated, but at the start of 2020 he joined Tonan Maebashi of the second division of the Kantō Soccer League. His registered name at the time was Leonardo.

In the summer of the same year, Bahia moved to Liga Portugal 2's Oliveirense. The following year, starting the 2021-22 season, he moved to Vilafranquense, also in the second division.

On 6 January 2023, it was announced that Bahia would be making a permanent transfer to J2 League club Zweigen Kanazawa. He started in the third round match against FC Machida Zelvia on 5 March, and recorded his first appearance in the J.League. He scored his first J.League goal in the match against JEF United Chiba on 2 April of the same year.

In January 2024, it was announced that Bahia would be making a permanent transfer to Yokohama FC.
