= Yudai Tokunaga =

Japanese footballer

Yudai Tokunaga 徳永 裕大
Personal information
- Full name: Yudai Tokunaga
- Date of birth: April 16, 1994 (age 32)
- Place of birth: Nishinomiya, Hyogo, Japan
- Height: 1.70 m (5 ft 7 in)
- Position: Midfielder

Team information
- Current team: SC Sagamihara
- Number: 6

Youth career
- Nishinomiya SSS
- –2012: Gamba Osaka

College career
Years	Team	Apps	(Gls)
2013–2016	Kwansei Gakuin University		

Senior career*
Years	Team	Apps	(Gls)
2017–2018	SC Sagamihara	42	(3)
2019–2022	Tegevajaro Miyazaki	100	(7)
2023–2024	Fujieda MYFC	11	(1)
2024–	SC Sagamihara	71	(2)
- * Club domestic league appearances and goals as of 17 August 2026

Yudai Tokunaga (徳永 裕大, Tokunaga Yudai; born April 16, 1994) is a Japanese football player. He plays for SC Sagamihara.

== Career ==
Yudai Tokunaga joined J3 League club SC Sagamihara in 2017.

== Club statistics ==
Updated to 1 January 2020.

Appearances and goals by club, season and competition
Club	Season	League			Emperor's Cup		Total	
Club	Season	Division	Apps	Goals	Apps	Goals	Apps	Goals
SC Sagamihara	2017	J3 League	23	2	–		23	2
SC Sagamihara	2018	J3 League	19	1	–		19	1
Tegevajaro Miyazaki	2019	JFL	24	3	–		24	3
Total			66	6	0	0	66	6
