= Kyohei Sugiura =

Japanese footballer (born 1989)

Kyohei Sugiura 杉浦 恭平
Personal information
- Full name: Kyohei Sugiura
- Date of birth: January 11, 1989 (age 37)
- Place of birth: Hamamatsu, Shizuoka, Japan
- Height: 1.76 m (5 ft 9 in)
- Position: Midfielder

Team information
- Current team: Zweigen Kanazawa
- Number: 11

Youth career
- 2004–2006: Shizuoka Gakuen High School

Senior career*
Years	Team	Apps	(Gls)
2007–2012	Kawasaki Frontale	1	(0)
2010–2011	→ Ehime FC (loan)	60	(5)
2013–2014	Vissel Kobe	25	(4)
2015–2016	Vegalta Sendai	8	(0)
2017–	Zweigen Kanazawa	325	(43)
Medal record
Kawasaki Frontale
Runner-up	J1 League	2008
Runner-up	J1 League	2009
Runner-up	J.League Cup	2007
Runner-up	J.League Cup	2009
- * Club domestic league appearances and goals as of 21 August 2026

Kyohei Sugiura (杉浦 恭平, Sugiura Kyōhei; born January 11, 1989 in Shizuoka prefecture) is a Japanese football player currently playing for Zweigen Kanazawa.

== Career statistics ==
Updated to end of 2018 season.

Club performance			League		Cup		League Cup		Continental		Total	
Season	Club	League	Apps	Goals	Apps	Goals	Apps	Goals	Apps	Goals	Apps	Goals
Japan			League		Emperor's Cup		League Cup		Asia		Total	
2007	Kawasaki Frontale	J1 League	0	0	0	0	0	0	0	0	0	0
2008	Kawasaki Frontale	J1 League	1	0	0	0	0	0	-		1	0
2009	Kawasaki Frontale	J1 League	0	0	1	0	0	0	0	0	1	0
2010	Ehime FC	J2 League	35	3	0	0	-		-		35	3
2011	Ehime FC	J2 League	25	2	1	0	-		-		26	2
2012	Kawasaki Frontale	J1 League	0	0	1	0	0	0	-		1	0
2013	Vissel Kobe	J2 League	25	4	1	0	-		-		26	4
2014	Vissel Kobe	J1 League	5	0	1	0	6	1	-		12	1
2015	Vegalta Sendai	J1 League	3	0	1	0	4	0	-		8	0
2016	Vegalta Sendai	J1 League	1	0	0	0	3	0	-		4	0
2017	Zweigen Kanazawa	J2 League	37	2	2	0	-		-		39	2
2018	Zweigen Kanazawa	J2 League	39	3	2	0	-		-		41	3
Career total			171	14	10	0	13	1	0	0	194	15
