= Seiya Katakura =

Japanese association football player

Personal information
- Date of birth: 5 December 1998 (age 27)
- Place of birth: Utsunomiya, Tochigi, Japan
- Height: 1.71 m (5 ft 7 in)
- Position: Defender

Team information
- Current team: Zweigen Kanazawa
- Number: 24

Youth career
- FC Anhelo Utsunomiya
- –2016: Kashimagakuen HS
- 2017–2020: Josai University

Senior career*
Years	Team	Apps	(Gls)
2021–	Zweigen Kanazawa	1	(0)
- * Club domestic league appearances and goals as of 17:04, 18 April 2021 (UTC)

Seiya Katakura (片倉誠也, Katakura Seiya; born 5 December 1998) is a Japanese footballer currently playing as a defender for Zweigen Kanazawa.

== Club career ==
Katakura made his professional debut in a 1–4 Emperor's Cup loss against Albirex Niigata.

== Career statistics ==
=== Club ===
As of 9 June 2021.

Club	Season	League			National Cup		League Cup		Other		Total	
Club	Season	Division	Apps	Goals	Apps	Goals	Apps	Goals	Apps	Goals	Apps	Goals
Zweigen Kanazawa	2021	J2 League	1	0	1 (Note: Appearances in the Emperor's Cup)	0	0	0	0	0	1	0
Career total			1	0	1	0	0	0	0	0	1	0
