= Koki Kido =

Japanese footballer

Koki Kido 木戸 皓貴
Personal information
- Full name: Koki Kido
- Date of birth: 28 June 1995 (age 31)
- Place of birth: Kumamoto, Japan
- Height: 1.76 m (5 ft 9 1/2 in)
- Position: Forward

Team information
- Current team: Veertien Mie
- Number: 33

Youth career
- Kumamoto United SC
- 2011–2013: Higashi Fukuoka High School

College career
Years	Team	Apps	(Gls)
2014–2017	Meiji University		

Senior career*
Years	Team	Apps	(Gls)
2018–2020	Avispa Fukuoka	67	(5)
2021–2022	Montedio Yamagata	38	(1)
2023–2024	ReinMeer Aomori	25	(4)
2024-	Veertien Mie	7	(0)
- * Club domestic league appearances and goals as of 27 August 2024 @ 14:51(AEST)

Koki Kido (木戸 皓貴, Kido Koki; born June 28, 1995) is a Japanese professional footballer who plays as a forward for Veertien Mie.

== Career ==
=== Avispa Fukuoka ===
After graduating at Meiji University, Kido signed for Avispa Fukuoka in October 2017. He made his league debut against Kamatamare Sanuki on 28 April 2018. Kido scored his first league goal against Ehime on 20 April 2019, scoring in the 14th minute.

=== Montedio Yamgata ===
On 2 January 2021, Kido joined J2 club Montedio Yamagata ahead of the 2021 season. He made his league debut against Machida Zelvia on 28 February 2021. Kido scored his first league goal against Blaublitz Akita on 10 April 2022, scoring in the 90th+5th minute. On 24 November 2022, it was announced that Montedio would not be renewing his contract. On 29 November 2022, he took part in tryouts.

=== ReinMeer Aomori ===
On 23 January 2023, Kido officially joined ReinMeer Aomori ahead of the 2023 season. At the end of the 2023 season, it was announced that ReinMeer would not be renewing his contract.

=== Veertien Mie ===
On 23 December 2023, Kido was announced at Veertien Mie.

== Career statistics ==
=== Club ===
Updated to the start from 2023 season.

Club performance			League		Cup		Total	
Season	Club	League	Apps	Goals	Apps	Goals	Apps	Goals
Japan			League		Emperor's Cup		Total	
2018	Avispa Fukuoka	J2 League	11	0	2	0	13	0
2019	Avispa Fukuoka	J2 League	30	3	2	1	32	4
2020	Avispa Fukuoka	J2 League	26	2	0	0	26	2
2020	Total		67	5	4	1	71	6
2021	Montedio Yamagata	J2 League	21	0	1	0	22	0
2022	Montedio Yamagata	J2 League	17	1	1	0	18	1
2022	Total		38	1	2	0	40	1
2023	ReinMeer Aomori	Japan Football League	0	0	0	0	0	0
2023	Total		0	0	0	0	0	0
Career total			105	6	6	1	111	7
