= Gaku Inaba =

Japanese association football player

Gaku Inaba 稲葉 楽
Personal information
- Date of birth: 27 April 2002 (age 24)
- Place of birth: Osaka, Japan
- Height: 1.87 m (6 ft 2 in)
- Position: Defender

Team information
- Current team: ReinMeer Aomori (on loan from Zweigen Kanazawa)

Youth career
- Izumi FC
- Cerezo Osaka
- 2018–2020: Fujieda Higashi High School

Senior career*
| Years | Team | Apps | (Gls) |
| 2021– | Zweigen Kanazawa | 6 | (0) |
| 2023– | → ReinMeer Aomori (loan) | 0 | (0) |
- * Club domestic league appearances and goals as of 22 December 2022, 14:22 (UTC)

Gaku Inaba (稲葉 楽, Inaba Gaku; born 27 April 2002) is a Japanese footballer who plays as a defender for ReinMeer Aomori from 2023, on loan from Zweigen Kanazawa.

== Club career ==
Inaba made his professional debut in a 1–4 Emperor's Cup loss against Albirex Niigata.

On 26 December 2022, Inaba was announced as a new loan transfer of ReinMeer Aomori for the upcoming 2023 season.

== Career statistics ==
=== Club ===
As of the end of the 2022 season

| Club | Season | League | | | National Cup | | League Cup | | Other | | Total | |
| Club | Season | Division | Apps | Goals | Apps | Goals | Apps | Goals | Apps | Goals | Apps | Goals |
|---|---|---|---|---|---|---|---|---|---|---|---|---|
| Zweigen Kanazawa | 2021 | J2 League | 6 | 0 | 1 (Note: Appearances in the Emperor's Cup) | 0 | 0 | 0 | 0 | 0 | 7 | 0 |
| Zweigen Kanazawa | 2022 | J2 League | 0 | 0 | 1 | 0 | 0 | 0 | 0 | 0 | 1 | 0 |
| ReinMeer Aomori (loan) | 2023 | Japan Football League | 0 | 0 | 0 | 0 | 0 | 0 | 0 | 0 | 0 | 0 |
| Career total | | | 6 | 0 | 2 | 0 | 0 | 0 | 0 | 0 | 8 | 0 |
