= Kosuke Okanishi =

Japanese footballer

Personal information
- Full name: Kosuke Okanishi
- Date of birth: 17 July 1990 (age 36)
- Place of birth: Yao, Osaka, Japan
- Height: 1.86 m (6 ft 1 in)
- Position: Goalkeeper

Team information
- Current team: Fujieda MYFC
- Number: 1

Youth career
- 2006–2008: Yamanashi Gakuin Univ. High School

College career
Years	Team	Apps	(Gls)
2009–2012	Chuo University		

Senior career*
Years	Team	Apps	(Gls)
2013–2022	Ventforet Kofu	61	(0)
2023–	Fujieda MYFC	0	(0)
- * Club domestic league appearances and goals as of 31 December 2019

Kosuke Okanishi (岡西宏祐, Okanishi, Kosuke; born 17 July 1990) is a Japanese professional footballer who plays as a goalkeeper for Fujieda MYFC.

== Club statistics ==
Updated to 23 February 2020.

Club performance			League		Cup		League Cup		Total	
Season	Club	League	Apps	Goals	Apps	Goals	Apps	Goals	Apps	Goals
Japan			League		Emperor's Cup		Emperor's Cup		Total	
2013	Ventforet Kofu	J1 League	0	0	–		0	0	0	0
2014	Ventforet Kofu	J1 League	0	0	0	0	0	0	0	0
2015	Ventforet Kofu	J1 League	0	0	1	0	1	0	2	0
2016	Ventforet Kofu	J1 League	1	0	1	0	5	0	7	0
2017	Ventforet Kofu	J1 League	0	0	0	0	4	0	4	0
2018	Ventforet Kofu	J2 League	0	0	0	0	4	0	4	0
2019	Ventforet Kofu	J2 League	1	0	3	0	–		4	0
Career total			2	0	5	0	14	0	21	0

== Honours ==
=== Club ===
Ventforet Kofu

- Emperor's Cup: 2022
