= Raisei Shimazu =

Japanese footballer

Raisei Shimazu 島津 頼盛
Personal information
- Full name: Raisei Shimazu
- Date of birth: 7 April 1999 (age 27)
- Place of birth: Osaka, Japan
- Height: 1.75 m (5 ft 9 in)
- Position: Midfielder

Team information
- Current team: Tiamo Hirakata
- Number: 17

Youth career
- 2015–2017: Kokoku High School

Senior career*
Years	Team	Apps	(Gls)
2018–2022	Zweigen Kanazawa	49	(9)
2021	→ Kagoshima United (loan)	8	(1)
2022	→ Tiamo Hirakata (loan)	23	(2)
2023–	Tiamo Hirakata	0	(0)
- * Club domestic league appearances and goals as of 10 December 2022, 16:28 (UTC)

Raisei Shimazu (島津 頼盛, Shimazu Raisei; born April 7, 1999) is a Japanese football player who plays as Midfielder and currently play for Tiamo Hirakata.

== Career ==
After being picker as a special designated player in 2017, Shimazu signed for Zweigen Kanazawa in the following year.

On 5 August 2021, Shimazu was loaned out to J3 club Kagoshima United from Zweigen Kanazawa.

On 8 January 2022, after his loan at Kagoshima expired, he was loaned out once again, now to JFL club Tiamo Hirakata for the 2022 season. Tiamo decided to signing him in 17 December 2022 on a full transfer.

== Career statistics ==
=== Club ===
Updated to the start of 2023 season.

Appearances and goals by club, season and competition
Club	Season	League			Emperor's Cup		Total	
Club	Season	Division	Apps	Goals	Apps	Goals	Apps	Goals
Zweigen Kanazawa	2018	J2 League	5	0	0	0	5	0
Zweigen Kanazawa	2019	J2 League	3	0	2	0	5	0
Zweigen Kanazawa	2020	J2 League	36	9	0	0	36	9
Zweigen Kanazawa	2021	J2 League	5	0	0	0	5	0
Kagoshima United (loan)	2021	J3 League	8	1	0	0	8	1
Tiamo Hirakata (loan)	2022	Japan Football League	23	2	0	0	23	2
Tiamo Hirakata	2023	Japan Football League	0	0	0	0	0	0
Total			80	12	2	0	82	12
