= Yuto Shirai =

Japanese footballer (born 1988)

Yuto Shirai 白井 裕人
Personal information
- Full name: Yuto Shirai
- Date of birth: June 19, 1988 (age 38)
- Place of birth: Kashiwa, Japan
- Height: 1.84 m (6 ft 1/2 in)
- Position: Goalkeeper

Team information
- Current team: Zweigen Kanazawa
- Number: 1

Youth career
- 2004–2006: RKU Kashiwa High School

College career
Years	Team	Apps	(Gls)
2007–2010	Ryutsu Keizai University		

Senior career*
Years	Team	Apps	(Gls)
2011–2016	Matsumoto Yamaga	62	(0)
2017–	Zweigen Kanazawa	251	(0)
- * Club domestic league appearances and goals as of 21 August 2026

Yuto Shirai (白井 裕人, born June 19, 1988) is a Japanese football player for Zweigen Kanazawa.

== Club statistics ==
Updated to end of 2018 season.

Club performance			League		Cup		League Cup		Total	
Season	Club	League	Apps	Goals	Apps	Goals	Apps	Goals	Apps	Goals
Japan			League		Emperor's Cup		J. League Cup		Total	
2011	Matsumoto Yamaga	JFL	19	0	4	0	-		23	0
2012	Matsumoto Yamaga	J2 League	14	0	1	0	-		25	0
2013	Matsumoto Yamaga	J2 League	27	0	0	0	-		27	0
2014	Matsumoto Yamaga	J2 League	0	0	1	0	-		1	0
2015	Matsumoto Yamaga	J1 League	1	0	0	0	1	0	2	0
2016	Matsumoto Yamaga	J2 League	1	0	1	0	–		2	0
2017	Zweigen Kanazawa	J2 League	42	0	2	0	–		44	0
2018	Zweigen Kanazawa	J2 League	33	0	1	0	–		34	0
Total			137	0	10	0	1	0	148	0
