= Yuki Kajiura (footballer) =

Japanese footballer

Yuki Kajiura 梶浦 勇輝
Personal information
- Date of birth: 2 January 2004 (age 22)
- Place of birth: Tokyo, Japan
- Height: 1.71 m (5 ft 7 in)
- Position: Midfielder

Team information
- Current team: FC Imabari (on loan from FC Tokyo)
- Number: 6

Youth career
- 2011–2015: FC Toripletta
- 2016–2021: FC Tokyo

Senior career*
Years	Team	Apps	(Gls)
2021–	FC Tokyo	3	(0)
2023–2024	→ Zweigen Kanazawa (loan)	77	(8)
2025–	→ FC Imabari (loan)	32	(1)

International career^{‡}
2018–2019	Japan U15		
2019–2020	Japan U16	2	(0)
2021	Japan U17		
- * Club domestic league appearances and goals as of 17 August 2026 ‡ National team caps and goals as of 19 May 2021, 17:04 (UTC)

Yuki Kajiura (梶浦 勇輝, Kajiura Yūki; born 2 January 2004) is a Japanese footballer currently playing as a midfielder for FC Imabari, on loan from FC Tokyo.

== Career ==
Kajiura joined FC Tokyo's youth set-ups from Toripletta on 2016. He graduated from the academy on 2021, following his first-team promotion on the J1 League club.

On 1 December 2022, Kajiura was loaned out to J2 League club Zweigen Kanazawa from 2023.

On 24 December 2024, Kajiura was loaned again to J2 promoted club, FC Imabari from 2025 season.

== Career statistics ==
=== Club ===
As of the start from 2025 season.

Club	Season	League			National Cup		League Cup		Other		Total	
Club	Season	Division	Apps	Goals	Apps	Goals	Apps	Goals	Apps	Goals	Apps	Goals
FC Tokyo	2021	J1 League	0	0	0	0	1 (Note: Appearances in the J.League Cup)	0	0	0	1	0
FC Tokyo	2022	J1 League	3	0	1	0	4	1	0	0	8	1
Zweigen Kanazawa (loan)	2023	J2 League	39	0	1	0	0	0	0	0	40	0
Zweigen Kanazawa (loan)	2024	J3 League	38	8	1	0	0	0	0	0	39	8
FC Imabari (loan)	2025	J2 League	0	0	0	0	0	0	0	0	0	0
Career total			80	8	3	0	5	1	0	0	88	9
