= Shintaro Shimada =

Japanese footballer

Shintaro Shimada 嶋田 慎太郎
Personal information
- Full name: Shintaro Shimada
- Date of birth: December 5, 1995 (age 30)
- Place of birth: Mashiki, Kumamoto, Japan
- Height: 1.66 m (5 ft 5 1/2 in)
- Position: Midfielder

Team information
- Current team: Zweigen Kanazawa
- Number: 41

Youth career
- 2008–2013: Roasso Kumamoto

Senior career*
Years	Team	Apps	(Gls)
2014–2017	Roasso Kumamoto	113	(12)
2018–2021	Omiya Ardija	50	(3)
2019	→ Oita Trinita (loan)	8	(0)
2021	→ Zweigen Kanazawa (loan)	33	(4)
2022–	Zweigen Kanazawa	130	(7)
- * Club domestic league appearances and goals as of 21 August 2026

Shintaro Shimada (嶋田 慎太郎, Shimada Shintaro; born December 5, 1995 in Mashiki, Kumamoto) is a Japanese football player for Zweigen Kanazawa.

== Career statistics ==
Updated to 23 February 2018.

Appearances and goals by club, season and competition
Club	Season	League			Emperor's Cup		Total	
Club	Season	Division	Apps	Goals	Apps	Goals	Apps	Goals
Roasso Kumamoto	2014	J2 League	6	1	0	0	6	1
Roasso Kumamoto	2015	J2 League	38	6	3	1	41	7
Roasso Kumamoto	2016	J2 League	35	1	1	0	36	1
Roasso Kumamoto	2017	J2 League	34	4	1	0	35	4
Career total			113	12	5	1	118	13
