= Sho Hiramatsu =

Japanese footballer

Sho Hiramatsu 平松 昇
Personal information
- Date of birth: 26 November 1998 (age 27)
- Place of birth: Shimada, Shizuoka, Japan
- Height: 1.67 m (5 ft 6 in)
- Position: Midfielder

Team information
- Current team: Giravanz Kitakyushu
- Number: 18

Youth career
- –2009: Shimada Daiichi SSS
- 2010–2016: Shimizu S-Pulse

College career
Years	Team	Apps	(Gls)
2017–2020	Rissho University		

Senior career*
Years	Team	Apps	(Gls)
2020–2023	Shonan Bellmare	4	(0)
2021–2022	→ Zweigen Kanazawa (loan)	51	(4)
2023	→ FC Ryukyu (loan)	29	(2)
2024–2025	FC Ryukyu	69	(3)
2026–	Giravanz Kitakyushu	11	(0)
- * Club domestic league appearances and goals as of 24 August 2026

Sho Hiramatsu (平松 昇, Hiramatsu Sho; born 26 November 1998) is a Japanese footballer currently playing as a midfielder for Giravanz Kitakyushu from 2026.

== Career ==
Hiramatsu begin first youth career with Shimizu S-Pulse until 2016, later he was entry to Rissho University from 2017 until he was graduation in 2020.

After Graduation, Hiramatsu sign first professional contract with Shonan Bellmare in 2020.

Hiramatsu was loaned out to J2 club, Zweigen Kanazawa for during 2021 season.

On 28 December 2022, Hiramatsu loaned again to J3 relegated club, FC Ryukyu for upcoming 2023 season.

== Career statistics ==
=== Club ===
As of the end of 2022 season.

Club	Season	League			National Cup		League Cup		Other		Total	
Club	Season	Division	Apps	Goals	Apps	Goals	Apps	Goals	Apps	Goals	Apps	Goals
Shonan Bellmare	2020	J1 League	1	0	0	0	0	0	0	0	1	0
Shonan Bellmare	2021	J1 League	3	0	1 (Note: Appearances in the Emperor's Cup)	0	3 (Note: Appearances in the J.League Cup)	0	0	0	7	0
Zweigen Kanazawa (loan)	2021	J2 League	17	2	0	0	0	0	0	0	17	2
Zweigen Kanazawa (loan)	2022	J2 League	34	2	1	0	0	0	0	0	35	2
FC Ryukyu (loan)	2023	J3 League	0	0	0	0	0	0	0	0	0	0
Career total			55	4	2	0	3	0	0	0	60	4
