= Megumu Nishida =

Japanese footballer (born 1998)

Megumu Nishida 西田 恵
Personal information
- Date of birth: 10 January 1998 (age 28)
- Place of birth: Osaka, Japan
- Height: 1.64 m (5 ft 5 in)
- Position: Midfielder

Team information
- Current team: Nara Club
- Number: 16

Youth career
- EXE'90 FC
- 2013–2015: Kansai Univ. Hokuyo High School

College career
Years	Team	Apps	(Gls)
2016–2019	Osaka University H&SS		

Senior career*
Years	Team	Apps	(Gls)
2020–2022	Zweigen Kanazawa	9	(0)
2021	→ Iwate Grulla Morioka (loan)	20	(1)
2022	→ Tegevajaro Miyazaki (loan)	21	(0)
2023–	Nara Club	0	(0)
- * Club domestic league appearances and goals as of 13 January 2023, 4:00 (UTC)

Megumu Nishida (西田 恵, Nishida Megumu; born 10 January 1998) is a Japanese footballer currently playing as a midfielder for Nara Club.

== Club career ==
In 2019, Nishida begin first career with J2 club, Zweigen Kanazawa from 2020.

In 2020, he loaned to Iwate Grulla Morioka and loan again to Tegevajaro Miyazaki for 2021 and 2022 respectively.

On 15 December 2022, Nishida officially transfer to J3 Newly promoted, Nara Club for upcoming 2023 season.

== Career statistics ==
=== Club ===
As of the start from 2023 season.

Club	Season	League			National Cup		League Cup		Other		Total	
Club	Season	Division	Apps	Goals	Apps	Goals	Apps	Goals	Apps	Goals	Apps	Goals
Zweigen Kanazawa	2020	J2 League	7	0	0	0	0	0	0	0	7	0
Iwate Grulla Morioka (loan)	2021	J3 League	20	1	0	0	0	0	0	0	20	1
Tegevajaro Miyazaki (loan)	2022	J3 League	21	0	0	0	0	0	0	0	21	0
Nara Club	2023	J3 League	0	0	0	0	0	0	0	0	7	0
Career total			48	1	0	0	0	0	0	0	48	1
