= Hayato Otani =

Japanese footballer

Hayato Otani 大谷 駿斗
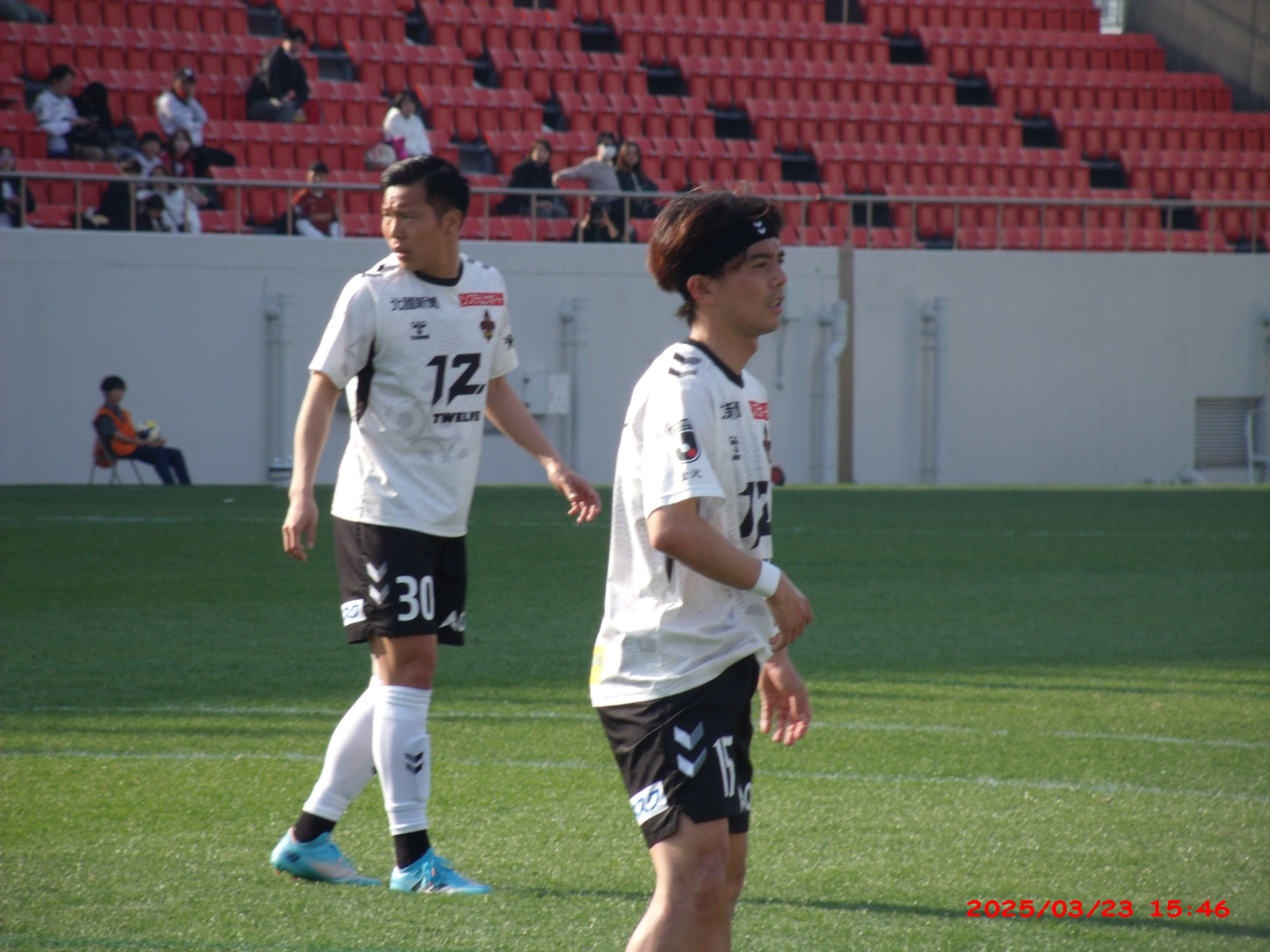
- Left: Hayato Otani, right: Kazuki Nishitani (both from Tsegen Kanazawa) March 2025, Hanazono Rugby Stadium, Higashiosaka City, J3 League match against FC Osaka

Personal information
- Full name: Hayato Otani
- Date of birth: January 17, 1997 (age 29)
- Place of birth: Ishikawa, Japan
- Height: 1.73 m (5 ft 8 in)
- Position: Forward

Team information
- Current team: Zweigen Kanazawa
- Number: 30

Youth career
- 2012–2014: Matto High School

College career
Years	Team	Apps	(Gls)
2015–2018	Kanazawa Gakuin University		

Senior career*
Years	Team	Apps	(Gls)
2018–2021	Kataller Toyama	49	(11)
2021–	Zweigen Kanazawa	133	(13)
- * Club domestic league appearances and goals as of 1 January 2026

Hayato Otani (大谷 駿斗, Ōtani Hayato; born January 17, 1997) is a Japanese football player who currently plays for Zweigen Kanazawa.

== Playing career ==
Otani was born in Ishikawa Prefecture on January 17, 1997. He joined J3 League club Kataller Toyama in 2018.
