= Ryuhei Oishi =

Japanese professional footballer

Personal information
- Date of birth: 21 January 1997 (age 29)
- Place of birth: Shizuoka, Japan
- Height: 1.69 m (5 ft 7 in)
- Position: Forward

Team information
- Current team: Blaublitz Akita
- Number: 14

Youth career
- 2009–2011: Júbilo Iwata
- 2012–2014: Shimizu Sakuragaoka High School

College career
| Years | Team | Apps | (Gls) |
| 2015–2018 | Kokushikan University | | |

Senior career*
| Years | Team | Apps | (Gls) |
| 2019–2023 | Zweigen Kanazawa | 115 | (14) |
| 2024– | Blaublitz Akita | 61 | (1) |
- * Club domestic league appearances and goals as of 14 August 2026

Ryuhei Oishi (大石 竜平, Ōishi Ryūhei; born 21 January 1997) is a Japanese professional footballer who plays as a forward for Blaublitz Akita.
