= Kojiro Nakano =

Japanese footballer

Kojiro Nakano 中野 小次郎
Personal information
- Full name: Kojiro Nakano
- Date of birth: 5 March 1999 (age 27)
- Place of birth: Tokushima, Tokushima, Japan
- Height: 2.00 m (6 ft 7 in)
- Position: Goalkeeper

Team information
- Current team: AC Nagano Parceiro
- Number: 21

Youth career
- 2006–2010: US FC
- 2011–2016: Tokushima Vortis

College career
Years	Team	Apps	(Gls)
2017–2020	Hosei University		

Senior career*
Years	Team	Apps	(Gls)
2020–	Hokkaido Consadole Sapporo	24	(0)
2023	→ Zweigen Kanazawa (loan)	3	(0)
2026–	→ AC Nagano Parceiro (loan)	5	(0)

International career^{‡}
2018	Japan U19	1	(0)
- * Club domestic league appearances and goals as of 17 August 2026 ‡ National team caps and goals as of 17:04, 26 September 2020 (UTC)

Kojiro Nakano (中野 小次郎, Nakano Kojiro; born 5 March 1999) is a Japanese footballer who plays as a goalkeeper for AC Nagano Parceiro, on loan from J2 League club Hokkaido Consadole Sapporo.

== Early life ==
Kojiro was born in Tokushima. He played youth football with Tokushima Vortis before going to Hosei University.

== Career ==
Kojiro made his debut for Consadole Sapporo on the 26th of September 2020.

Kojiro made his debut for Zweigen against Iwaki on the 12th of April 2023.

== Career statistics ==
=== Club ===
As of 21 March 2023.

Appearances and goals by club, season and competition
Club	Season	League			National Cup		League Cup		Other		Total	
Club	Season	Division	Apps	Goals	Apps	Goals	Apps	Goals	Apps	Goals	Apps	Goals
Japan			League		Emperor's Cup		J.League Cup		Other		Total	
Hosei University	2019	–			4	0	–		–		4	0
Hokkaido Consadole Sapporo	2020	J1 League	5	0	0	0	0	0	–		5	0
Hokkaido Consadole Sapporo	2021	J1 League	2	0	2	0	1	0	–		5	0
Hokkaido Consadole Sapporo	2022	J1 League	6	0	0	0	5	0	–		11	0
Hokkaido Consadole Sapporo	Total		13	0	2	0	6	0	0	0	21	0
Zweigen Kanazawa (loan)	2023	J2 League	0	0	0	0	–		–		0	0
Career total			13	0	6	0	6	0	0	0	25	0
