= Rikito Sugiura =

Japanese footballer (born 2002)

Rikito Sugiura 杉浦 力斗
Personal information
- Date of birth: 22 October 2002 (age 24)
- Place of birth: Osaka, Japan
- Height: 1.82 m (6 ft 0 in)
- Position: Forward

Team information
- Current team: Tegevajaro Miyazaki (on loan from Zweigen Kanazawa)

Youth career
- Iris Ikuno SS
- 2018–2020: Kokoku High School

Senior career*
Years	Team	Apps	(Gls)
2020–	Zweigen Kanazawa	20	(0)
2022	→ Ococias Kyoto AC (loan)	2	(0)
2023–	→ Tegevajaro Miyazaki (loan)	0	(0)
- * Club domestic league appearances and goals as of 24 December 2022, 2:54 (UTC)

Rikito Sugiura (杉浦 力斗, Sugiura Rikito; born 22 October 2002) is a Japanese footballer currently playing as a forward for Tegevajaro Miyazaki from 2023, on loan from Zweigen Kanazawa as a designated special player.

== Career statistics ==
=== Club ===
As of the end 2022 season.

Club	Season	League			National Cup		League Cup		Other		Total	
Club	Season	Division	Apps	Goals	Apps	Goals	Apps	Goals	Apps	Goals	Apps	Goals
Zweigen Kanazawa	2020	J2 League	20	0	0	0	0	0	0	0	20	0
Zweigen Kanazawa	2021	J2 League	0	0	0	0	0	0	0	0	0	0
Zweigen Kanazawa	2022	J2 League	2	0	1	0	0	0	0	0	3	0
Ococias Kyoto AC (loan)	2022	Japanese Regional Leagues	2	0	0	0	0	0	0	0	2	0
Tegevajaro Miyazaki (loan)	2023	J3 League	0	0	0	0	0	0	0	0	0	0
Career total			24	0	1	0	0	0	0	0	25	0
