= Derlan =

Brazilian footballer (born 1996)

Personal information
- Full name: Derlan de Oliveira Bento
- Date of birth: 3 February 1996 (age 30)
- Place of birth: Volta Redonda, Brazil
- Height: 1.87 m (6 ft 2 in)
- Position: Centre back

Team information
- Current team: Suwon FC
- Number: 3

Youth career
- 2009–2011: Nova Iguaçu
- 2011–2014: Desportivo Brasil
- 2013–2014: → Fluminense (loan)
- 2014–2016: Fluminense

Senior career*
Years	Team	Apps	(Gls)
2017–2019	Fluminense	0	(0)
2017	→ Boavista (loan)	4	(0)
2018	→ Paysandu (loan)	5	(0)
2018	→ Grêmio (loan)	1	(0)
2019	→ Criciúma (loan)	35	(1)
2020–2021	Chapecoense	59	(5)
2022	Guarani	39	(0)
2023–2025	Oita Trinita	84	(4)
2026–	Suwon FC	12	(0)
- * Club domestic league appearances and goals as of 5 August 2026

Derlan de Oliveira Bento (born 3 February 1996), simply known as Derlan, is a Brazilian footballer who plays as a central defender for Suwon FC.

== Career ==
Derlan abroad to Japan and signed J2 club, Oita Trinita for upcoming 2023 season.

== Career statistics ==
As of the end of 2022 season.

Club	Season	League			State League		Cup		Continental		Other		Total	
Club	Season	Division	Apps	Goals	Apps	Goals	Apps	Goals	Apps	Goals	Apps	Goals	Apps	Goals
Boavista	2017	Série D	3	0	—		—		—		1 (Note: Appearance(s) in Copa Rio)	0	4	0
Paysandu	2018	Série B	0	0	4	0	1	0	—		0	0	5	0
Grêmio	2018	Série A	1	0	—		—		—		—		1	0
Criciúma	2019	Série B	27	0	6	1	2	0	—		—		35	1
Chapecoense	2020	Série B	15	1	11	2	2	0	—		—		28	3
Chapecoense	2021	Série A	15	1	13	1	2	0	—		1 (Note: Appearance(s) in Recopa Catarinense)	0	31	2
Guarani	2022	Série B	26	0	0	0	1	0	—		—		27	0
Guarani	Total		87	2	24	3	8	0	—		2	0	121	6
Oita Trinita	2023	J2 League	0	0	—		0	0	—		—		0	0
Oita Trinita	Total		0	0	—		0	0	—		0	0	0	0
Career total			87	2	24	3	8	0	—		2	0	121	6

== Honours ==
Chapecoense

- Campeonato Catarinense: 2020
- Campeonato Brasileiro Série B: 2020
