= SC Sagamihara =

Japanese football club

SC Sagamihara SC相模原
- Full name: Sports Club Sagamihara
- Founded: 2008; 18 years ago
- Stadium: Sagamihara Gion Stadium; Minami-ku, Sagamihara, Kanagawa
- Capacity: 15,300
- Chairman: Shigeyoshi Mochizuki
- Manager: Yuki Richard Stalph
- League: J3 League
- 2025: J3 League, 12th of 20
- Website: www.scsagamihara.com
Home colours	Away colours

Sports Club Sagamihara (スポーツクラブ相模原, Supōtsukurabu Sagamihara) commonly known as SC Sagamihara (SC相模原, Esu Shī Sagamihara) is a Japanese professional football club based in Sagamihara, Kanagawa Prefecture. They currently play in the J3 League, Japanese third tier of professional football.

== History ==
In 2011 they joined the Division 2 of the Kanto Football League after three years of consecutive promotions through the Kanagawa Prefectural League. In 2012, they won the Regional Promotion Series and were promoted to the Japan Football League. Since 2014, the club has belonged to the recently established J3 League, where they played for seven seasons before being promoted to J2 League in 2020 as J3 runners-up.

After just one season in J2, Sagamihara returned to the J3 for the 2022 season, having been relegated from the J2 being three points off the relegation zone. In 2025, the club are playing their 4th consecutive season at the J3.

Among their players, former Japan national member Yoshikatsu Kawaguchi has featured for SC Sagamihara.

== Stadium ==
The home stadium is Sagamihara Asamizo Park Stadium (Sagamihara Gion Stadium), and the training ground is Ayase Sports Park Multipurpose Square in Ayase City and Nojima Football Park in Minami-ku, Sagamihara City。 In addition, although it is not official, training sessions may also be held at Sagamihara Sports and Recreation Park in Chuo-ku, Sagamihara City, Yokoyama Park Artificial Turf Ground, Fuso Futsal Field Sagamihara Kamimizo, and Sagamihara Asamizo Park No. 2 Stadium (Sagamihara Gion Field) in Minami-ku, Sagamihara City.

== League and cup record ==
Champions	Runners-up	Third place	Promoted	Relegated

League														J. League Cup	Emperor's Cup	Shakaijin Cup
Season	Division	Tier	Teams	Pos.	P	W	D	L	F	A	GD	Pts	Attendance/G	J. League Cup	Emperor's Cup	Shakaijin Cup
2008	Kanagawa Prefecture; 3rd Division H	8	8	1st	7	7	0	0	45	2	43	21	-	Not eligible	Did not qualify	
2009	Kanagawa Prefecture; 2nd Division B	7	12	1st	11	11	0	0	83	4	79	33	-	Not eligible	Did not qualify	
2010	Kanagawa Prefecture; Division 1	6	12	1st	11	9	2	0	45	9	36	29	-	Not eligible	Did not qualify	
2011	Kanto Division 2	5	8	1st	14	10	1	3	40	12	28	31	-	Not eligible	Did not qualify	Runner's up
2012	Kanto Division 1	4	10	1st	18	15	2	1	42	13	29	47	-	Not eligible	Did not qualify	Did not qualify
2013	JFL	3	18	3rd	34	18	7	9	58	42	16	61	1,924	Not eligible	Did not qualify	Not eligible
2014	J3	3	12	6th	30	10	7	13	39	43	-4	37	3,133	Not eligible	Did not qualify	Not eligible
2015	J3	3	13	4th	28	14	6	8	44	34	10	48	3,291	Not eligible	Did not qualify	Not eligible
2016	J3	3	16	11th	30	9	8	13	29	46	-17	35	4,344	Not eligible	Did not qualify	Not eligible
2017	J3	3	17	12th	32	9	12	11	34	41	-7	39	3,657	Not eligible	Did not qualify	Not eligible
2018	J3	3	17	9th	32	12	6	14	42	53	-11	42	3,458	Not eligible	Did not qualify	Not eligible
2019	J3	3	18	15th	34	10	8	16	36	45	-9	38	2,879	Not eligible	Did not qualify	Not eligible
2020 †	J3	3	18	2nd	34	16	13	5	43	35	8	61	918	Not eligible	Did not qualify	Not eligible
2021 †	J2	2	22	19th	42	8	14	20	33	54	-21	38	2,372	Not eligible	3rd round	Not eligible
2022	J3	3	18	18th	34	6	7	21	31	50	-19	25	1,933	Not eligible	Didn't qualify	Not eligible
2023	J3	3	20	18th	38	9	14	15	44	48	-4	41	2,302	Not eligible	2nd round	Not eligible
2024	J3	3	20	9th	38	14	11	13	41	41	0	53	2,820	1st round	2nd round	Not eligible
2025	J3	3	20	12th	38	13	11	14	38	50	-12	50	2,810	1st round	Quarter-finals	Not eligible
2026	J3	3	40	17th	18	7	5	6	31	33	-2	28	3,354	N/A	N/A	Not eligible
2026-27	J3	3	20	TBD	38									TBD	TBD	Not eligible

Key

- Pos. = Position in league; P = Games played; W = Games won; D = Games drawn; L = Games lost; F = Goals scored; A = Goals conceded; GD = Goals difference; Pts = Points gained
- Attendance/G = Average league home attendance
- † 2020 & 2021 seasons attendances reduced by COVID-19 worldwide pandemic.
- Source: J. League Data Site

== Honours ==
SC Sagamihara Honours
Honour	No.	Years
All Japan Club Teams Cup	1	2008
Kanagawa Prefecture 3rd Division H	1	2008
Kanagawa Prefecture 2nd Division B	1	2009
Kanagawa Prefecture Division 1	1	2010
Kantō Division 2	1	2011
Kantō Division 1	1	2012
Regional Football League Competition	1	2012

== Current squad ==
As of 8 August 2026.

Note: Flags indicate national team as defined under FIFA eligibility rules; some limited exceptions apply. Players may hold more than one non-FIFA nationality.

No.	Pos.	Nation	Player
1	GK	JPN	Motoaki Miura
2	DF	JPN	Ko Watahiki
3	DF	GER	Kevin Pytlik
4	MF	JPN	Toshio Shimakawa
6	MF	JPN	Yudai Tokunaga
7	FW	JPN	Akito Tanahashi (on loan from Tokushima Vortis)
8	MF	JPN	Kosuke Kambe
9	FW	JPN	Kai Sasaki
10	MF	JPN	Riku Nakayama
11	FW	JPN	Yuki Muto
13	DF	JPN	Masato Tokida
14	FW	JPN	Tsubasa Ando

No.	Pos.	Nation	Player
15	MF	JPN	Taira Maeda
16	DF	JPN	Ryo Takano
17	MF	JPN	Takato Takeuchi
18	DF	JPN	Kai Miki
19	DF	JPN	Sora Okita (on loan from Mito HollyHock)
20	MF	JPN	Yuto Kawabata
21	GK	KOR	Kim Min-ho
22	GK	JPN	Daichi Sugimoto
23	MF	JPN	Yusaku Takusari
24	MF	JPN	Ren Sugimoto
37	DF	JPN	Rintaro Yamauchi
93	FW	THA	Thanawut Phochai (on loan from Nongbua Pitchaya)

== Coaching staff ==
Position	Name
Manager	(Japan) Yuki Richard Stalph
Assistant manager	(Japan) Kenji Takahashi
First-team coach	(Japan) Hiroki Mizumoto
Goalkeeper coach	(Japan) Akihiro Watanabe
Analyst	(Japan) Tomoki Hasegawa
Interpreter	(Japan) Takayoshi Fujii
Head of conditioning	(Japan) Hideki Misu
Chief trainer	(Japan) Hirotaka Ogawa
Trainer	(Japan) Junya Muroi
Assistant trainer	(Japan) Masataka Hayashi
Conditioning coach	(Japan) Tetsuya Nakajima
Equipment	(Japan) Yoshihiko Ito
Competent	(Japan) Naoto Todoroki
Side affairs & Team supporter	(Japan) Takanori Chiaki
Chief doctor	(Japan) Jun Fukuda
Doctor	(Japan) Daiki Watanabe
Sports pharmacist	(Japan) Yo Kokubu

== Managerial history ==
Manager	Nationality	Tenure	
Manager	Nationality	Start	Finish
Tadahiro Akiba	Japan	1 February 2009	31 January 2011
Tetsuya Totsuka	Japan	1 February 2011	31 May 2011
Shigeyoshi Mochizuki	Japan	1 June 2011	31 December 2011
Tetsumasa Kimura	Japan	1 February 2012	31 January 2015
Keiju Karashima	Japan	1 February 2015	31 January 2016
Yoshika Matsubara	Japan	1 November 2015	30 November 2015
Norihiro Satsukawa	Japan	1 February 2016	18 August 2016
Sōtarō Yasunaga	Japan	20 August 2016	31 December 2017
Takayuki Nishigaya	Japan	1 February 2018	31 January 2019
Fumitake Miura	Japan	1 February 2019	31 May 2021
Takuya Takagi	Japan	2 June 2021	20 May 2022
Norihiro Satsukawa	Japan	23 May 2022	31 January 2023
Kazuyuki Toda	Japan	1 February 2023	19 June 2024
Kenji Takahashi (Caretaker)	Japan	20 June 2024	25 June 2024
Yuki Richard Stalph	Japan	26 June 2024	Present

== Kit evolution ==
Home kit - 1st
2014	2015	2016	2017	2018
2019	2020	2021	2022	2023
2024	2025	2026 -		

Away kit - 2nd
2014	2015	2016	2017	2018
2019	2020	2021	2022	2023
2024	2025 -			
