= Zweigen Kanazawa =

Japanese football club

Zweigen Kanazawa ツエーゲン金沢
- Full name: Zweigen Kanazawa
- Nickname: Zweigen
- Founded: 1956; 70 years ago (as Kanazawa Soccer Club)
- Stadium: Go Go Curry Stadium; Kanazawa, Ishikawa
- Capacity: 10,444
- Chairman: Hiroshi Yonezawa
- Manager: Maki Tsujita
- League: J3 League
- 2025: J3 League, 6th of 20
- Website: www.zweigen-kanazawa.jp
Home colours	Away colours

Zweigen Kanazawa (ツエーゲン金沢, Tsuēgen Kanazawa) is a Japanese football club based in Kanazawa, Ishikawa Prefecture. They currently play in the J3 League, Japan's third tier of professional league football after being relegated at the end of 2023 of J2 League.

== History ==
The club was formed in 1956 under the simple name Kanazawa Soccer Club and adopted its current identity in 2006. The Hokushinetsu region, long sleepy in football terms and whose potential only arose with Albirex Niigata leading the way, provided few opportunities for Kanazawa to rise in Japan's football ranks until the late 2000s. On 19 December 2009 they were promoted to the JFL after beating FC Kariya at the promotion/relegation playoff with 2–1 aggregate score, following a third-place finish in the 2009 All Japan Regional Football Promotion League Series.

On December 15, 2010, a new management company called Zweigen, Inc. was established in order to apply to the J-League associate membership.

On January 7, 2011, the team applied for J-League associate membership.

On 16 November 2014, Zweigen became the inaugural J3 League champions, and gained a licence to compete in J2 League from 2015.

On 22 October 2023, Zweigen officially relegated to J3 League for the 2024 season after a narrow by Montedio Yamagata 0–1, thus ending their 9 years stay in J2.

=== Name and symbolism ===
The name "Zweigen" is a portmanteau of the German zwei, for the number 2, and gen, to advance. In Kanazawa dialect, the phrase tsuyoi noda! (We're strong!) became tsuee gen! by double entendre. In German, the word Zweigen means branches (dative—nominative: Zweige), and owing to this, a fleur-de-lis is a key part of the club's crest.

== Stadium ==
From 1974 to 2024, their home stadium was the 20,261 capacity general-purpose Ishikawa Kanazawa Stadium.

Since 18 February 2024, Zweigen Kanazawa have played at the 10,444 capacity Kanazawa Stadium.

== League & cup record ==
Champions	Runners-up	Third place	Promoted	Relegated

League														J. League Cup	Emperor's Cup
Season	Div.	Tier	Teams	Pos.	P	W	D	L	F	A	GD	Pts	Attendance/G	J. League Cup	Emperor's Cup
2010	JFL	3	18	9th	34	13	9	12	46	41	5	48	1,548	Not eligible	2nd round
2011	JFL	3	18	7th	33	13	8	12	49	40	9	47	2,504	Not eligible	2nd round
2012	JFL	3	17	14th	32	8	12	12	33	41	-8	36	2,313	Not eligible	1st round
2013	JFL	3	18	7th	34	14	8	12	60	48	12	50	2,063	Not eligible	3rd round
2014	J3	3	12	1st	33	23	6	4	56	20	36	75	3,440	Not eligible	2nd round
2015	J2	2	22	12th	42	12	18	12	46	43	3	54	4,910	Not eligible	2nd round
2016	J2	2	22	21st	42	8	15	19	36	60	-24	39	4,179	Not eligible	2nd round
2017	J2	2	22	17th	42	13	10	19	49	67	-18	49	4,397	Not eligible	3rd round
2018	J2	2	22	13th	42	14	13	15	52	48	4	55	4,528	Not eligible	3rd round
2019	J2	2	22	11th	42	15	16	11	58	46	12	61	5,209	Not eligible	3rd round
2020 †	J2	2	22	18th	42	12	13	17	57	67	-10	49	1,866	Not eligible	Did not qualify
2021 †	J2	2	22	17th	42	10	11	21	39	60	-21	41	2,533	Not eligible	2nd round
2022	J2	2	22	14th	42	13	13	16	56	69	-13	52	3,421	Not eligible	3rd round
2023	J2	2	22	22nd	42	9	7	25	40	69	-29	34	4,239	Not eligible	2nd round
2024	J3	3	20	12th	38	13	11	14	50	52	-2	50	5,435	1st round	1st round
2025	J3	3	20	6th	38	18	5	15	53	45	8	59	5,564	1st round	2nd round
2026	J3	3	40	23rd	18	5	7	6	15	21	-6	27	4,438	N/A	N/A
2026-27	J3	3	20	TBD	38									TBD	TBD

Key

- Pos. = Position in league; P = Games played; W = Games won; D = Games drawn; L = Games lost; F = Goals scored; A = Goals conceded; GD = Goals difference; Pts = Points gained
- Attendance/G = Average home league attendance
- † 2020 & 2021 seasons attendances reduced by COVID-19 worldwide pandemic
- Source: J.League Data Site
- Source: Japan Football League 2010

== Honours ==
Zweigen Kanazawa Honours
Honour	No.	Years
Hokushinetsu Division 1	1	2004
Ishikawa Prefectural Football Championship Emperor's Cup Ishikawa Prefectural Qualifiers	10	2007, 2008, 2009, 2010, 2011, 2012, 2013, 2014, 2024, 2025
J3 League	1	2014

== Current squad ==
As of 1 August 2026

Note: Flags indicate national team as defined under FIFA eligibility rules; some limited exceptions apply. Players may hold more than one non-FIFA nationality.

No.	Pos.	Nation	Player
1	GK	JPN	Yuto Shirai
2	DF	JPN	Norimichi Yamamoto
3	DF	JPN	Hiroto Hatao
6	DF	JPN	Koichi Murata
7	MF	JPN	Rikuu Tosa
8	MF	JPN	Keisuke Oyama
9	FW	JPN	Keita Buwanika
10	FW	BRA	Patric
11	FW	JPN	Kyohei Sugiura
13	FW	JPN	Keita Shirawachi (on loan from Iwaki FC)
14	MF	JPN	Yusei Shinomiya
15	MF	JPN	Yuki Nishiya
16	DF	JPN	Shunya Mori
17	MF	JPN	Taiki Kato
18	FW	JPN	Tomoya Osawa
19	DF	JPN	Shogo Terasaka (on loan from Vissel Kobe)
20	DF	JPN	Hayate Nagakura

No.	Pos.	Nation	Player
23	MF	JPN	Kyota Sakakibara (on loan from Nagoya Grampus)
24	MF	JPN	Kohei Mochizuki (on loan from Yokohama F. Marinos)
26	MF	JPN	Jin Murata
27	DF	JPN	Haruka Suzuki
29	DF	JPN	Kaito Miyazaki
30	FW	JPN	Hayato Otani
31	GK	JPN	Itsuki Ueda
38	DF	JPN	Hayato Ariyoshi
39	DF	JPN	Honoya Shoji
40	MF	JPN	Ryu Kawakami (on loan from FC Osaka)
41	MF	JPN	Shintaro Shimada
50	GK	JPN	Daiki Goto
51	GK	JPN	Shuntaro Motobayashi ^{Type 2}
55	DF	JPN	Daisuke Matsumoto
71	DF	JPN	Fuga Sakurai
83	GK	JPN	Tsubasa Nishizawa (on loan from Júbilo Iwata)

=== Out on loan ===
Note: Flags indicate national team as defined under FIFA eligibility rules; some limited exceptions apply. Players may hold more than one non-FIFA nationality.

No.	Pos.	Nation	Player

== Coaching staff ==
Position	Name
Head coach	(Japan) Maki Tsujita
Assistant head coach	(Japan) Kiyokazu Kudo (Japan) Hiroki Shibuya
Goalkeeper coach	(Japan) Noriyuki Yamagishi
Physical coach	(Japan) Tetsuya Sakamoto
Analytical coach	(Japan) Wataru Kuriwaki
Chief trainer	(Japan) Chikashi Masui
Trainer	(Japan) Seiya Motooka (Japan) Takahiro Yagi
Interpreter	(Japan) Rafael Rayden Igarashi
Equipment manager	(Japan) Tomoya Araki
Team manager	(Japan) Tatsuya Hirano

== Managerial history ==
Manager	Nationality	Tenure		Managerial Record				
Manager	Nationality	Start	Finish	P	W	D	L	Win %
Nobuhiro Ueno	Japan	1 February 2009	31 January 2012	81	37	17	27	45.68
Hitoshi Morishita	Japan	1 February 2012	31 January 2017	0	0	0	0	—
Masaaki Yanagishita	Japan	1 February 2017	5 November 2023	0	0	0	0	—
Akira Ito	Japan	11 December 2023	1 June 2025	0	0	0	0	—
Maki Tsujita	Japan	3 June 2025	present	0	0	0	0	—

Key

- Source: J.League Data Site

== Kit evolution ==
The club colours are red, black and yellow.

Home Kit - 1st
2006 - 2007	2008 - 2010	2011	2012	2013
2014	2015	2016	2017	2018
2019	2020	2021	2022	2023
2024	2025	2026 -		

Away Kit - 2nd
2008 - 2010	2011	2012 - 2013	2014	2015
2016	2017	2018	2019	2020
2021	2022	2023	2024	2025
2026 -

Special Kits - 3rd
Summer 2019	2021 3rd	2022 3rd	2023 3rd
