= 2023 V-Varen Nagasaki season =

V-Varen Nagasaki
2023 season
- Chairman: Hideki Iwashita
- Manager: Fábio Carille
- Stadium: Transcosmos Stadium Nagasaki
- J2 League: 4th
- Emperor's Cup: Second round
Home colours	Away colours
- All statistics correct as of 13 May 2023.

The 2023 season was V-Varen Nagasaki's 19th season in existence and the club's fifth consecutive season in the second division of Japanese football. In addition to the domestic league, V-Varen Nagasaki participated in this season's edition of the Emperor's Cup.

== Players ==
=== First-team squad ===
As of 31 March 2023.

Note: Flags indicate national team as defined under FIFA eligibility rules; some limited exceptions apply. Players may hold more than one non-FIFA nationality.

No.	Pos.	Nation	Player
1	GK	JPN	Masaya Tomizawa
3	DF	JPN	Jun Okano
4	DF	BRA	Valdo
5	DF	JPN	Ryo Okui
6	MF	JPN	Yuya Kuwasaki
8	MF	JPN	Asahi Masuyama
9	FW	ESP	Juanma
13	MF	JPN	Masaru Kato
14	MF	JPN	Takumi Nagura
15	DF	JPN	Hijiri Kato
17	MF	JPN	Hiroki Akino
18	DF	JPN	Yuta Imazu
19	MF	JPN	Takashi Sawada
20	MF	JPN	Yohei Otake
21	GK	JPN	Go Hatano (on loan from FC Tokyo)
23	DF	JPN	Shunya Yoneda

No.	Pos.	Nation	Player
24	FW	JPN	Ten Miyagi (on loan from Kawasaki Frontale)
25	DF	JPN	Kazuki Kushibiki
26	MF	JPN	Raiju Obuchi
27	FW	JPN	Ken Tokura
28	DF	JPN	Shunki Takahashi
29	FW	BRA	Clayson
30	GK	SRB	Luka Radotic
31	GK	JPN	Gaku Harada
32	FW	JPN	Serigne Saliou Diop
33	MF	JPN	Tsubasa Kasayanagi
34	MF	JPN	Seiya Satsukida
35	MF	JPN	Taisei Abe
37	MF	JPN	Gijo Sehata
38	MF	JPN	Kaito Matsuzawa
39	DF	BRA	Kaique Mafaldo
40	DF	JPN	Haruki Shirai

=== Out on loan ===
Note: Flags indicate national team as defined under FIFA eligibility rules; some limited exceptions apply. Players may hold more than one non-FIFA nationality.

No. / Pos. / Nation / Player; — / DF / JPN / Kota Muramatsu (at Giravanz Kitakyushu)	No. / Pos. / Nation / Player; — / FW / JPN / Koya Okuda (at Zweigen Kanazawa)

== Transfers ==
Transfers in
Join on	Pos.	Player	Moving from	Transfer type
10 Mar	GK	(Serbia) Luka Radotic	(Serbia) OFK Beograd	Free transfer
Pre-season	GK	(Japan) Go Hatano	(Japan) FC Tokyo	Loan transfer
Pre-season	DF	(Japan) Yuta Imazu	(Japan) Sanfrecce Hiroshima	Full transfer
Pre-season	DF	(Japan) Jun Okano	(Japan) Machida Zelvia	Full transfer
Pre-season	DF	(Brazil) Valdo	(Japan) Shimizu S-Pulse	Full transfer
Pre-season	DF	(Japan) Haruki Shirai	(Japan) Hosei University	Free transfer
Pre-season	MF	(Japan) Asahi Masuyama	(Japan) Oita Trinita	Full transfer
Pre-season	MF	(Japan) Gijo Sehata	(Japan) Toyo University	Free transfer
Pre-season	MF	(Japan) Raiju Obuchi	(Japan) Higashi Fukuoka HS	Free transfer
Pre-season	MF	(Japan) Takumi Nagura	(Japan) Vegalta Sendai	Loan return
Pre-season	FW	(Spain) Juanma	(Japan) Avispa Fukuoka	Full transfer
Pre-season	FW	(Japan) Ten Miyagi	(Japan) Kawasaki Frontale	Loan transfer
Pre-season	FW	(Japan) Serigne Saliou Diop	(Japan) Nagoya Sangyo University	Loan transfer; 2023 DSP

Transfers out
Leave on	Pos.	Player	Moving to	Transfer type
Pre-season	GK	(Japan) Suguru Asanuma	(Japan) Criacao Shinjuku	Free transfer
Pre-season	GK	(Japan) Takashi Kasahara	(Japan) Omiya Ardija	Loan expiration
Pre-season	DF	(Japan) Yusei Egawa	(Japan) Gamba Osaka	Full transfer
Pre-season	DF	(Japan) Hiroshi Futami	(Japan) FC Imabari	Full transfer
Pre-season	DF	(Japan) Kota Muramatsu	(Japan) Giravanz Kitakyushu	Loan transfer
Pre-season	DF	(Japan) Shuta Kikuchi	(Japan) Shimizu S-Pulse	Loan expiration
Pre-season	FW	(Japan) Asahi Uenaka	(Japan) Yokohama F. Marinos	Full transfer
Pre-season	FW	(Japan) Ryohei Yamazaki	(Japan) Tegevajaro Miyazaki	Full transfer
Pre-season	FW	(Japan) Koya Okuda	(Japan) Zweigen Kanazawa	Loan transfer
Pre-season	FW	(Colombia) Victor Ibarbo	–	Contract expiration

== Competitions ==
=== Overview ===
Competition	First match	Last match	Starting round	Record							
Competition	First match	Last match	Starting round	Pld	W	D	L	GF	GA	GD	Win %
J2 League	18 February 2023	12 November 2023	Matchday 1	15	8	2	5	23	14	+9	53.33
Emperor's Cup	7 June 2023		Second round	0	0	0	0	0	0	+0	—
Total				15	8	2	5	23	14	+9	53.33

Last updated: 13 May 2023
Source: Soccerway

=== J2 League ===
==== League table ====
Pos	Team	Pld	W	D	L	GF	GA	GD	Pts	Promotion or relegation
5	Montedio Yamagata	42	21	4	17	64	54	+10	67	Qualification for the promotion play-offs
6	JEF United Chiba	42	19	10	13	61	53	+8	67	Qualification for the promotion play-offs
7	V-Varen Nagasaki	42	18	11	13	70	56	+14	65	
8	Ventforet Kofu	42	18	10	14	60	50	+10	64	
9	Oita Trinita	42	17	11	14	54	56	−2	62	

Source: Meiji Yasuda J2 League, J.League Data Site
Rules for classification: 1) Points; 2) Goal difference; 3) Goals scored; 4) Head-to-head points; 5) Head-to-head goal difference; 6) Head-to-head goal scored; 7) Fair-play points.

==== Results summary ====
Overall								Home						Away					
Pld	W	D	L	GF	GA	GD	Pts	W	D	L	GF	GA	GD	W	D	L	GF	GA	GD
15	8	2	5	23	14	+9	26	4	1	1	14	7	+7	4	1	4	9	7	+2

Last updated: 13 May 2023.
Source: Worldfootball

==== Results by round ====
Round	1	2	3	4	5	6	7	8	9	10	11	12	13	14	15	16	17	18	19	20	21	22	23	24	25	26	27	28	29	30	31	32	33	34	35	36	37	38	39	40	41	42
Ground	H	A	H	A	A	H	A	A	H	A	H	A	H	H	A	H	A	H	A	A	H	H	A	A	H	A																
Result	L	L	D	D	W	W	W	L	W	W	W	W	W	L	L	D	D	W	D	L	W	W	L	W	L																	
Position	20	21	21	21	16	11	7	12	6	5	3	2	2	4	4	4	5	4	4	6	5	4	5	5	7																	

Updated to match(es) played on 13 May 2023. Source: Worldfootball
A = Away; H = Home; W = Win; D = Draw; L = Loss

==== Matches ====
The league fixtures were announced on 20 January 2023.

18 February 2023 1	V-Varen Nagasaki	0–1	JEF United Chiba	Isahaya
14:00		Report		Stadium: Transcosmos Stadium Nagasaki

25 February 2023 2	Fujieda MYFC	2–0	V-Varen Nagasaki	Fujieda
14:00		Report		Stadium: Fujieda Soccer Stadium

4 March 2023 3	V-Varen Nagasaki	1–1	Shimizu S-Pulse	Isahaya
14:00		Report		Stadium: Transcosmos Stadium Nagasaki

12 March 2023 4	Tochigi SC	0–0	V-Varen Nagasaki	Utsunomiya
14:00		Report		Stadium: Tochigi Green Stadium

19 March 2023 5	Roasso Kumamoto	0–2	V-Varen Nagasaki	Kumamoto
14:00		Report		Stadium: Egao Kenko Stadium

25 March 2023 6	V-Varen Nagasaki	3–2	Montedio Yamagata	Isahaya
14:00		Report		Stadium: Transcosmos Stadium Nagasaki

1 April 2023 7	Vegalta Sendai	0–1	V-Varen Nagasaki	Sendai
14:00		Report		Stadium: Yurtec Stadium Sendai; Attendance: 9,085; Referee: Tom Nield (England)

8 April 2023 8	Thespakusatsu Gunma	1–0	V-Varen Nagasaki	Maebashi
14:00		Report		Stadium: Shoda Shoyu Stadium Gunma; Attendance: 2,264; Referee: Keisuke Nobori

12 April 2023 9	V-Varen Nagasaki	2–1	Ventforet Kofu	Isahaya
19:00		Report		Stadium: Transcosmos Stadium Nagasaki

16 April 2023 10	Tokushima Vortis	0–4	V-Varen Nagasaki	Naruto
14:00		Report		Stadium: Pocarisweat Stadium

22 April 2023 11	V-Varen Nagasaki	4–2	Blaublitz Akita	Isahaya
14:00		Report		Stadium: Transcosmos Stadium Nagasaki

29 April 2023 12	Iwaki FC	0–1	V-Varen Nagasaki	Iwaki
14:00		Report		Stadium: Iwaki Green Field

3 May 2023 13	V-Varen Nagasaki	4–0	Mito HollyHock	Isahaya
14:00		Report		Stadium: Transcosmos Stadium Nagasaki

7 May 2023 14	V-Varen Nagasaki	1–2	Tokyo Verdy	Isahaya
14:00		Report		Stadium: Transcosmos Stadium Nagasaki

13 May 2023 15	Zweigen Kanazawa	2–0	V-Varen Nagasaki	Kanazawa
14:00	Shoji 20'; Hayashi 52'	Report		Stadium: Ishikawa Kanazawa Stadium; Attendance: 2,317; Referee: Toru Kakinuma

17 May 2023 16	V-Varen Nagasaki	0–0	Fagiano Okayama	Isahaya
19:00		Report		Stadium: Transcosmos Stadium Nagasaki; Attendance: 4,104; Referee: Reo Tanaka

21 May 2023 17	Oita Trinita	1–1	V-Varen Nagasaki	Oita
14:00		Report		Stadium: Resonac Dome Oita

27 May 2023 18	V-Varen Nagasaki	2–1	Júbilo Iwata	Isahaya
14:00		Report		Stadium: Transcosmos Stadium Nagasaki

3 June 2023 19	Renofa Yamaguchi	1–1	V-Varen Nagasaki	Yamaguchi
14:00		Report		Stadium: Ishin Me-Life Stadium

11 June 2023 20	Machida Zelvia	4–1	V-Varen Nagasaki	Machida
14:00		Report		Stadium: Machida GION Stadium

17 June 2023 21	V-Varen Nagasaki	2–1	Omiya Ardija	Isahaya
19:00		Report		Stadium: Transcosmos Stadium Nagasaki

24 June 2023 22	V-Varen Nagasaki	5–1	Zweigen Kanazawa	Isahaya
19:00		Report		Stadium: Transcosmos Stadium Nagasaki

1 July 2023 23	Shimizu S-Pulse	3–2	V-Varen Nagasaki	Shizuoka
18:00	Carlinhos 14'; Inui 28'; Kitagawa 90+1'	Report	Delgado 61'; Sawada 68'	Stadium: Nihondaira Sports Stadium; Referee: Yuzo Sutani

=== Emperor's Cup ===
7 June 2023 Second round	V-Varen Nagasaki	0–1	Ventforet Kofu	Isahaya
19:00			Junio o.g. 7	Stadium: Transcosmos Stadium Nagasaki; Attendance: 2,304; Referee: Toru Kakinuma
