= Johann Kaspar Mertz =

Austro-Hungarian composer and guitarist

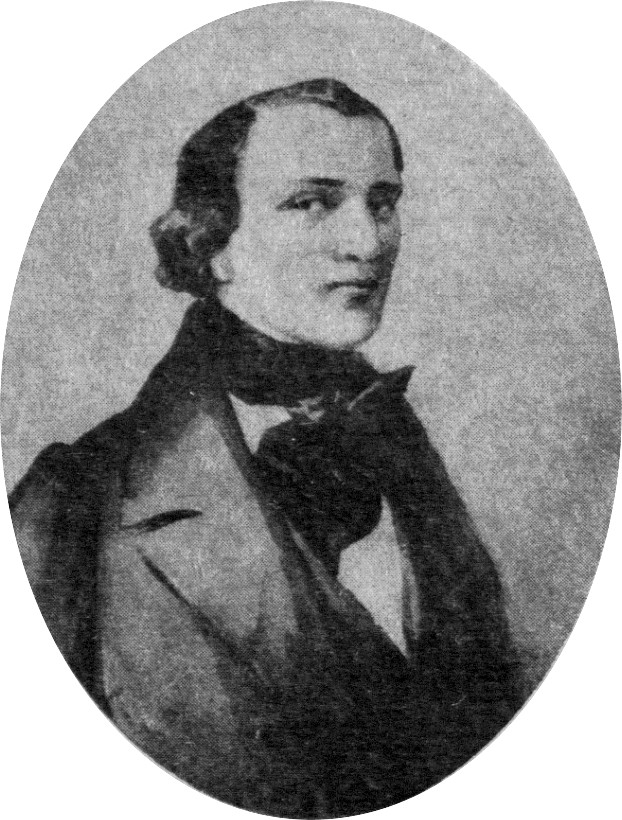
Undocumented anonymous portrait of J. K. Mertz

Joseph Kaspar Mertz (17 August 1806 – 14 October 1856) was an Austrian guitarist and composer.

== Biography ==
Caspar Joseph Mertz (baptised Casparus Josephus Mertz) was born in Pressburg (now Bratislava, Slovakia), then the capital of the Kingdom of Hungary and part of the Austrian Empire. He never used his full name when performing or on his publications, preferring only the initials "J. K.". The name "Johann Kaspar" first appeared in the German guitar journal "Der Guitarrefreund" in 1901 and since that time has been incorrectly repeated. In 1900 J. M. Miller used the name "Joseph K. Mertz" for his publication of three previously unpublished manuscripts of Mertz in Three Compositions For Guitar.

He was active in Vienna (c. 1840 – 1856), which had been home to various prominent figures of the guitar, including Anton Diabelli, Mauro Giuliani, Wenceslaus Matiegka and Simon Molitor. As virtuoso, he established a solid reputation as a performer. He toured Moravia, Poland, and Russia, and gave performances in Berlin and Dresden. In 1846 Mertz nearly died of an overdose of strychnine that had been prescribed to him as a treatment for neuralgia. Over the following year he was nursed back to health in the presence of his wife, the concert pianist Josephine Plantin whom he married in 1842. Some speculation may lead one to the conclusion that listening to his wife performing the romantic piano pieces of the day during his period of recovery may have had an influence on the sound and unusual right hand technique he adopted for the Bardenklänge (Bardic Sounds) op. 13 (1847).

Mertz's guitar music, unlike that of most of his contemporaries, followed the pianistic models of Beethoven, Liszt, Chopin, Mendelssohn, Schubert and Schumann, rather than the classical models of Mozart and Haydn (as did Sor and Aguado), or the bel canto style of Rossini (as did Giuliani). Though the date of his birth indicates that that was the logical influence, since Sor was born in 1778, Aguado in 1784 and Giuliani in 1781 while Mertz in 1806, a difference of about 25 years.

The Bardenklänge are probably Mertz's most important contribution to the guitar repertoire (a series of character pieces in the mould of Schumann), together with the great fantasias La rimembranza, Pensée fugitive and Harmonie du soir, considered a trilogy, the most technically demanding pieces written by Mertz, clearly inspired by Liszt's piano music.

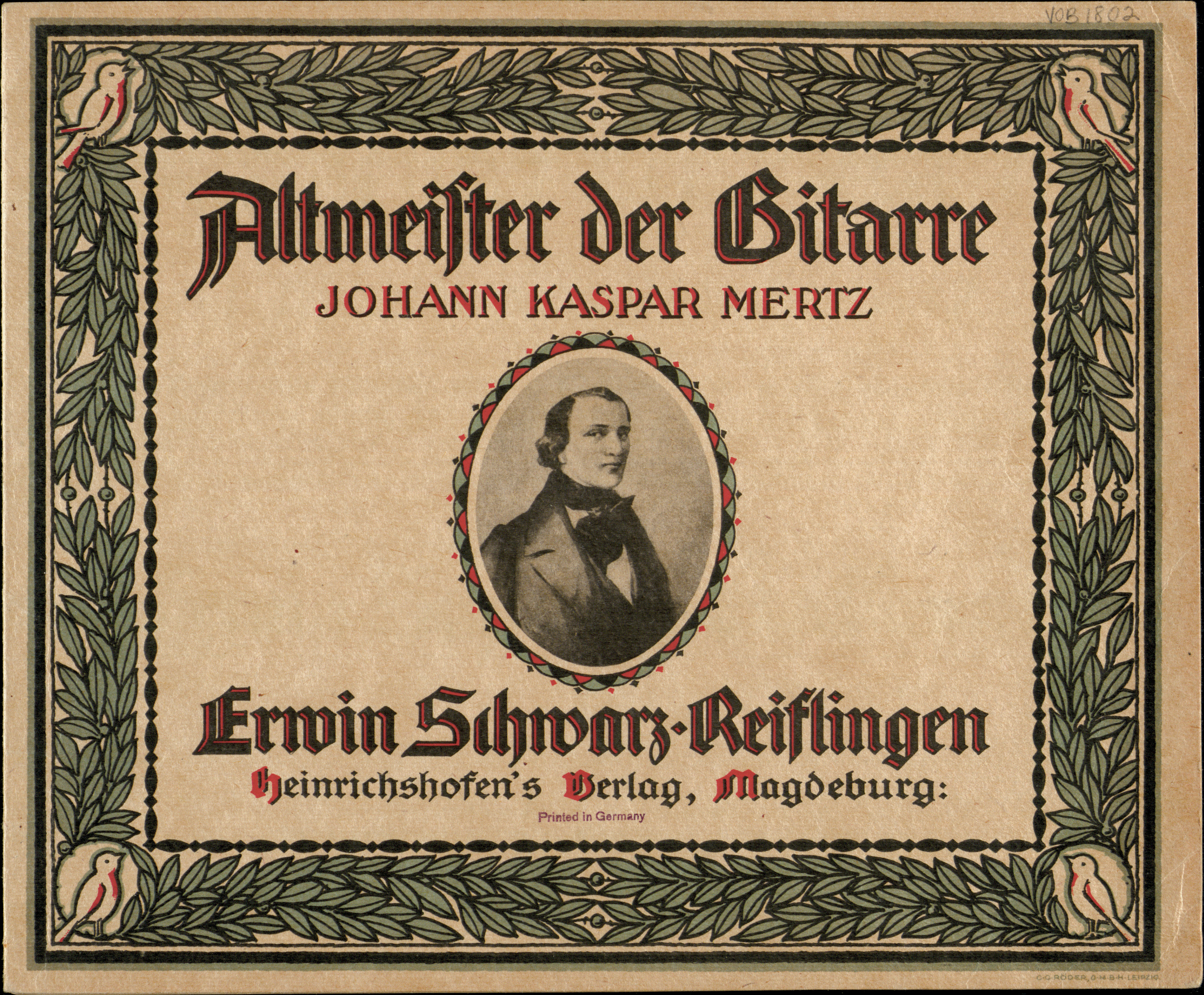
Cover of Altmeister der Gitarre: Johann Kaspar Mertz.

The portrait of J. K. Mertz first appeared on the cover of Erwin Schwarz-Reiflingen's 1920 book Altmeister der Gitarre: Johann Kaspar Mertz. There was no attribution for the source, but in Schwarz-Reiflingen's commentary he mentions the duo 'Fantasie aus der oper "Elisier d'amour' came as a previously unpublished manuscript from Edward Bayer, Jr., son of the well-known guitarist Edward Bayer. It is possible, yet unconfirmed, that the portrait could also have come from the estate of Edward Bayer. The grayscale reproductions of the portrait have all come from a photo the Japanese guitar collector Jiro Nakano took in the 1970s from a copy of Altmeister der Gitarre: Johann Kaspar Mertz in the collection of Morishige Takei. It was provided to Astrid Stempnik for her dissertation by Masami Kimura. Originals of this book are only known to exist in the Takei Collection (at the Kunitachi College of Music, Tokyo, Japan), Bickford Collection (at California State University, Northridge) and The Danish Music Museum.

== Selected compositions ==
=== Guitar solo ===
- Ungarische Vaterlands-Blüthen op. 1 (Vienna: Tobias Haslinger, 1840)
- Nachtviolen op. 2 (Vienna: Tobias Haslinger, 1840)
- Zwey Polonaisen und Mazurka op. 3 (Vienna: Tobias Haslinger, 1840)
- Trois Nocturnes op. 4 (Vienna: Tobias Haslinger, 1840)
- Cyanen op. 5 (Vienna: Tobias Haslinger, 1840)
- Le Carneval de Venice. Air varié op. 6 (Vienna: Tobias Haslinger, 1840)
- Opern-Revue op. 8 (33 numbers) (Vienna: Tobias Haslinger, 1843–56)
- 6 Ländler op. 9 (Vienna: Tobias Haslinger's Witwe & Sohn, 1844)
- Introduction et Rondo Brillant op. 11 (Vienna: Tobias Haslinger's Witwe & Sohn, 1844)
- Erinnerung an Ischl. 6 Ländler op. 12 (Vienna: Tobias Haslinger's Witwe & Sohn, 1846)
- Barden-Klänge op. 13. A series of pieces separated into 15 Hefte. The first 10 were published in 1847, the next three in 1850. The 12th and 13th contain arrangements by Mertz of Polonaises by Michal Kleofas Oginski. The 14th and 15th were arbitrarily inserted by the publisher of the 1899 edition. Included are H1: An Malvina; Romanze, Andante, H2: Abendlied; Unruhe; Elfenreigen, H3: An die Entfernte; Etude; Capriccio, H4: Gondoliera; Liebeslied, H5: Fingals-Höhle; Gebeth, H6: Tarantelle, H7: Variations Mignonnes, H8: Kindermärchen, H9: Rondino, H10: Romanze, Moderato; Scherzo; Sehnsucht, H11: Lied ohne Worte; Mazurka, H12: Polonaise Favorites du Prince M. Oginski, nos. 1-4, H13: Polonaise Favorites du Prince M. Oginski, nos. 5-7, H14: Romanze; H15: Walzer im Ländlerstyl (Vienna: Tobias Haslinger's Witwe & Sohn, 1847–52; Nos. 14 & 15: Berlin: Schlesinger-Lienau, 1899).
- Fantasie über 'Linda di Chamounix' (Donizetti) op. 14 (Prague: J. Hoffmann, 1845)
- Divertissement über 'Don Pasquale' (Donizetti) op. 15 (Prague: J. Hoffmann, 1845)
- 6 Schubert'sche Lieder (Vienna: Tobias Haslinger's Witwe & Sohn, 1845)
- Schule für die Guitarre (Vienna: Tobias Haslinger's Witwe & Sohn, 1848)
- Portefeuille für Guitarre-Spieler. Includes: Martha. Musik von F. Flotow op. 16; Der Prophet. Musik von G. Meyerbeer op. 21; Agathe op. 22; Glockentöne op. 24; Fantaisie über Motive aus der Oper 'Don Juan' [Mozart] op. 28; Das Blümlein op. 34; Nabucco. Musik von G. Verdi op. 62; Rigoletto. Musik von G. Verdi op. 63; Il Trovatore. Musik von G. Verdi op. 86; L'Étoile du nord. Opera de G. Meyerbeer Op. 100 (Munich: Jos. Aibl, 1850–56).
- Original Steyrer Tänze op. 33 (Munich: Jos. Aibl, 1851)
- Caprice sur un thème favori de C.M. de Weber op. 50 (Munich: Jos. Aibl, 1852)
- Kukuk. Musikalische Rundschau (12 numbers) (Munich: Jos. Aibl, 1852–54)
- Trois Morceaux op. 65. Includes: Fantaisie hongroise; Fantaisie originale; Le Gondolier (Vienna: Charles Haslinger, 1857)
- El Olé / La Madrilena. Spanische Nationaltänze op. 89 (Munich: Jos. Aibl, n.d.)
- Concertino (1856), unpublished
- Pianto dell'amante (Romanze) (Moscow: Jurgenson, 1886)
- La rimembranza
- Pensée fugitive
- Harmonie du soir

=== Guitar duo ===
(all written for terz guitar and guitar)

- Alessandro Stradella (Flotow) op. 51 (Munich: Jos. Aibl, 1851)
- Nänien. Trauerlieder. Includes: Am Grabe der Geliebten; Ich denke dein; Trauermarsch (originally unpublished; ed. by Simon Wynberg, Heidelberg: Chanterelle, 1985)
- Vespergang (originally unpublished; first ed. Munich guitar club, 1903; 2nd ed. Heidelberg: Chanterelle, 1985)
- Unruhe (originally unpublished; Heidelberg: Chanterelle, 1985)
- Mazurka (originally unpublished; Heidelberg: Chanterelle, 1985)
- Tarantella (originally unpublished; Heidelberg: Chanterelle, 1985)
- Der Ball, unpublished
- Barcarole (Munich guitar club, 1909; Heidelberg: Chanterelle, 1985)
- Impromptu (St Petersburg, n.d.; Heidelberg: Chanterelle, 1985)
- Wasserfahrt am Traunsee, unpublished
- Ständchen (ed. Heidelberg: Chanterelle, 1985)
- Deutsche Weise (ed. Heidelberg: Chanterelle, 1985)
- 1re Grande fantaisie concertante 'La Rage', unpublished
- Fantasie über 'Elisir d'amore' (Donizetti) (ed. by Erwin Schwarz-Reiflingen, Magdeburg: Heinrichshofen, 1920)

=== Chamber music ===
- Divertissement über 'Der Prophet' (Meyerbeer) op. 32 for violin/flute, viola, guitar (Munich: Jos. Aibl, 1851)
- Mazurka op. 40 for guitar and piano [written with his wife, Josephine Mertz] (Munich: Jos. Aibl, 1852)
- Barcarole op. 41 for guitar and piano [written with his wife, Josephine Mertz] (Munich: Jos. Aibl, 1852)
- Divertissement über 'Rigoletto' (Verdi) op. 60 for guitar and piano [written with his wife, Josephine Mertz] (Munich: Jos. Aibl, 1853)
- Wasserfahrt am Traunsee. Tonstück, for terz guitar and piano (Munich: Jos. Aibl, 1864)
- Einsiedler's Waldglöcklein. Tonstück, for terz guitar and piano (Munich: Jos. Aibl, 1864)

=== Songs ===
- Beliebte Gesänge mit Begleitung der Guitare [sic!] op. 13 (14 numbers; works by Schubert, Suppé, and Gustav Hölzel in Mertz's arrangement) (Vienna: Tobias Haslinger's Witwe & Sohn, 1847–49)
- Verlust / Der Zithernschläger (J.G. Seidl) op. 52 (Munich: Jos. Aibl, 1853)

== Bibliography ==
- Masami Kimura: "Johann K. oder Josef K. Mertz", in: nova giulianiad vol. 3 no. 9–10 (1986)
- Astrid Stempnik: Caspar Joseph Mertz: Leben und Werk des letzten Gitarristen im österreichischen Biedermeier (Frankfurt: Peter Lang, 1990), ISBN 3-631-41801-9.
- Andrew Stroud: Johann Kaspar Mertz and Style Hongrois. An Examination of Elements of Hungarian Style Within 'Fantaisie Hongroise' Op. 65 No. 1 (Saarbrücken: Lambert Academic Publishing, 2012), ISBN 978-3-659-23310-4.
- Masami Kimura: Tárrega and Mertz (Dallas: DGA Editions, 2018), ISBN 978-0-9883876-6-9.

== Selected recordings ==
- Duo Sonare Plays Giuliani, Sor, Mertz and Coste, performed by Duo Sonare, on: Sound-Star-Ton CD-SST 31110 (CD, 1991). Contains: Unruhe; Vespergang; Deutsche Weise; Impromptu; Trauermarsch; Tarantelle.
- Bardenklänge, a selection, performed by Richard Savino, on: Harmonia Mundi France 907115 (CD, 1994). Contains the first 8 volumes of Barden-Klänge.
- Tonstücke. Sämtliche Werke für zwei Gitarren, performed by Duo Favori (Barbara Gräsle, Frank Armbruster), on: Tacet 42 (CD, 1995). Contains (in this order): Deutsche Weise; Der Ball; Ständchen; Nänien; Tarantelle; Verspergang; Mazurka; Wasserfahrt am Traunsee; Barcarola; Unrühe; Impromptu.
- Guitar Duos, performed by Sonja Prunnbauer and Johannes Tappert, on: Musikproduktion Dabringhaus & Grimm MDG 603 1139-2 (CD, 2002). Contains: Wasserfahrt am Traunsee; Barcarole; Erinnerung an Ungarn I & II; Nänien; Unruhe; Ständchen; Mazurka; Deutsche Weise; Vespergesang; La Rage.
- Bardenklänge op. 13, performed by Adam Holzman, on: Naxos 8.554556 (CD, 2002). Contains the first 11 volumes of Barden-Klänge except Rondino and Mazurka.
- Werke für Gitarre / Works for Guitar, performed by Maximilian Mangold, on: Musicaphon MUS 56873 (CD, 2005). Contains: Pianto dell'Amante; Le Romantique; Elegie; Liebeslied; Unruhe; Romanze; Capriccio; Abendlied; Introduction et Rondo brillant; Caprice sur un theme favori de Carl Maria de Weber; Fantasie Hongroise.
- Guitar Duets, performed by Laura Fraticelli and Johannes Möller, on: Naxos 8.573055 (CD, 2014). Contains (in this order): Unruhe; Nänien; Mazurka; Ständchen; Wasserfahrt am Traunsee; La Rage; Vespergang; Barcarole; Impromptu; Tarantelle; Deutsche Weise.
- Barden-Klänge, performed by Graziano Salvoni, on: Brilliant Classics 94473 (double CD, 2014). Contains the first 11 volumes of Barden-Klänge.
- Dances, Nocturnes and Etudes, performed by Graziano Salvoni, on: Brilliant Classics 94653 (double CD, 2014). Contains: Verlands-Blüthen op. 1; Nachtviolen op. 2; Zwey Polonaisen und Mazurka op. 3; Trois Nocturnes op. 4; Cyanen op. 5; 6 Ländler op. 9; Introduction et Rondo Brillant op. 11; Erinnerung an Ischl 6 Ländler op. 12; Übungsstücke nos. 1–15; Walzer im Ländlerstyl; studies (Bojie nos. 387, 389, 391); pieces in Bojie Collection no. 388, 390, 394, 406, 414; 7 waltzes op. posth.
- Le Romantique, performed by Raphaella Smits, on: Accent ACC 24303 (CD, 2015; recorded 1988–2003). Contains: Harmonie du soir; Le Romantique; Tarantelle op. 13 no. 6; Introduction et Rondeau Brillant op. 11; 6 Schubert'sche Lieder für die Guitare übertragen; Le Carnaval de Venise op. 6; Le Gondolier op. 65 no. 3; Pianto dell'Amante; La Rimembranza; Souvenir de Choulhoff.
- Mertz: Fantasias for solo guitar, performed by Giuseppe Chiaramonte, on: Brilliant Classics 95722 (2019). Contains: 3 Morceaux op. 65: Fantaisie hongroise, Fantaisie originale, Le Gondolier; Pianto dell’amante; La rimembranza; Pensée fugitive; Harmonie du soir; Fantaisie über “Don Juan” op. 28.

== See also ==
- List of Austrians in music
