= Morishige (name) =

Morishige (written: 森重) is a Japanese surname. Notable people with the surname include:

- Hisaya Morishige (森繁 久彌; 1913–2009), Japanese actor and comedian
- Masato Morishige (森重 真人; born 1987), Japanese footballer
- Yosuke Morishige (森重 陽介; born 2004), Japanese footballer

Morishige (written: 盛重 or 守成) is also a masculine Japanese given name. Notable people with the name include:

- Kokubu Morishige (国分 盛重; 1553–1615), Japanese samurai
- Sakuma Morishige (佐久間 盛重; died 1560), Japanese samurai
- Morishige Takei (武井 守成; 1890–1949), Japanese classical mandolinist
