= Obuchi =

Obuchi is a Japanese surname 小渕. Notable people with the surname include:

- Keizo Obuchi (1937–2000), Japanese politician
- Yūko Obuchi (born 1973), Japanese politician, daughter of Keizo
- Raiju Obuchi (born 2003), Japanese association footballer
