= 2021 All Japan High School Soccer Tournament =

Tournament details
- Country: Japan
- Dates: 28 December 2021 – 10 January 2022
- Teams: 48

Final positions
- Champions: Aomori Yamada High School (3rd title)
- Runners-up: Ohzu High School

Tournament statistics
- Matches played: 47
- Goals scored: 151 (3.21 per match)
- Top goal scorer(s): Akito Suzuki (Hannan, 7 goals)

The 2021 All Japan High School Soccer Tournament (All Japan JFA 100th High School Soccer Tournament (Japanese: 第100回全国高等学校サッカー選手権大会)) marked the 100th edition of the referred annually contested cup for High Schools over Japan. As usual, the tournament was contested by 48 High Schools, with 1 High School per Prefecture being qualified for the tournament, with an exception made for the Tokyo, which have 2 High School representing their Prefecture. The final was played at the Japan National Stadium, in Tokyo.

The Yamanashi Gakuin High School were the defending champions, after winning the 2020 edition, winning over Aomori Yamada by 4–2 on a penalty shoot-out. However, they were eliminated in their first match on the 2021 tournament, losing 2–0 to Saga Higashi. In the end, Aomori Yamada won their 3rd title, with a 4–0 win in the final against Ohzu, who qualified for the final over Kanto Daiichi's withdrawal on the semi-finals, due to coronavirus-related issues that prevented their participation on the semi-finals.

== Calendar ==
The tournament took place in a 14-day span, with the tournament split in a total of 6 stages. The schedule was decided on 13 August 2021 by the JFA.

| Round | Date | Matches | Clubs |
|---|---|---|---|
| First round | 28–29 December 2021 | 16 | 32 (32) → 16 |
| Second round | 31 December 2021 | 16 | 32 (16+16) → 16 |
| Third round | 2 January 2022 | 8 | 16 → 8 |
| Quarter-finals | 4 January 2022 | 4 | 8 → 4 |
| Semi-finals | 8 January 2022 | 2 | 4 → 2 |
| Final | 10 January 2022 | 1 | 2 → 1 |

== Venues ==
The tournament was played in four prefectures and nine stadiums, with six (two for each prefecture) located in Chiba, Kanagawa, and Saitama Prefectures, and three located in Tokyo. They are:

- Tokyo – Japan National Stadium, Ajinomoto Field Nishigaoka, and Komazawa Olympic Park Stadium
- Saitama – Kumagaya Athletic Stadium and NACK5 Stadium Omiya
- Kanagawa – NHK Spring Mitsuzawa Football Stadium and Kawasaki Todoroki Stadium
- Chiba – Fukuda Denshi Arena and Kashiwanoha Stadium

== Participating clubs ==
In parentheses: the amount of times each team qualified for the All Japan High School Tournament (appearance in the 2021 edition included)

| Hokkaido: Hokkai High School (11); Aomori: Aomori Yamada High School (27); Iwate: Senshu Kitakami High School (2); Miyagi: Sendai Ikuei Gakuen High School (36); Akita: Akita Shogyo High School (46); Yamagata: Haguro High School (8); Fukushima: Shoshi High School (12); Ibaraki: Kashima Gakuen High School (10); Tochigi: Yaita Chuo High School (12); Gunma: Maebashi Ikuei High School (24); Saitama: Seibudai High School (4); Chiba: Ryutsu Keizai Univ. Kashiwa High School (7); Tokyo A: Horikoshi High School (4); Tokyo B: Kanto Daiichi High School (4); Kanagawa: Toko Gakuen High School (12); Yamanashi: Yamanashi Gakuin High School (8); Nagano: Ichiritsu Nagano High School (1); Niigata: Teikyo Nagaoka High School (9); Toyama: Toyama Daiichi High School (32); Ishikawa: Seiryō High School (30); Fukui: Maruoka High School (32); Shizuoka: Shizuoka Gakuen High School (13); Aichi: Chubu Univ. Daiichi High School (13); Mie: Mie High School (1) | Gifu: Teikyo Kani High School (8); Shiga: Kusatsu Higashi High School (12); Kyoto: Higashiyama High School (3); Osaka: Hannan Univ. High School (2); Hyōgo: Takigawa Daini High School (21); Nara: Nara Ikuei High School (14); Wakayama: Kindai Univ. Wakayama High School (8); Tottori: Yonago Kita High School (17); Shimane: Taisha High School (11); Okayama: Okayama Gakugeikan High School (4); Hiroshima: Setouchi High School (2); Yamaguchi: Takagawa Gakuen High School (27); Kagawa: Takamatsu Shogyo High School (24); Tokushima: Tokushima Shogyo High School (40); Ehime: Imabari Higashi High School (2); Kōchi: Kōchi Gakuen High School (17); Fukuoka: Higashi Fukuoka High School (22); Saga: Saga Higashi High School (2); Nagasaki: Nagasaki IAS High School (8); Kumamoto: Ohzu High School (18); Ōita: Nakatsu Higashi High School (5); Miyazaki: Miyazaki Nihon Univ. High School (2); Kagoshima: Kamimura Gakuen High School (9); Okinawa: Nishihara High School (4) |

== Schedule ==
The draw to decide the match pairings was conducted on 15 November.

=== First round ===
| 28 December 2021 1 | Kanto Daiichi | 6−0 | Nakatsu Higashi | Shinjuku |
| 15:00 | Ayumu Wakamatsu 13'; Kota Sakai 22'; Hinata Fujii 40+2'; Rin Homma 43'; Keita Hirakata 76'; Renji Hidano 79' | Report (JFA); Report (JFA) | | Stadium: Japan National Stadium; Attendance: 8,587 |

| 29 December 2021 1 | Akita Shogyo | 0−1 | Higashi Fukuoka | Kumagaya |
| 14:10 | | Report (JFA); Report (JFA) | Umi Narasaki 30' | Stadium: Kumagaya Athletic Stadium; Attendance: 2,934 |

| 29 December 2021 1 | Chubu Daiichi | 0−5 | Ohzu | Saitama |
| 14:10 | | Report (JFA); Report (JFA) | Rei Yakushida 4'; Seren Ichimura 27'; Shunei Kobayashi 35'; Asuma Ikari 59'; Tsubasa Inada 75' | Stadium: NACK5 Stadium Omiya; Attendance: 1,222 |

| 29 December 2021 1 | Seibudai | 0−1 | Mie | Saitama |
| 12:05 | | Report (JFA); Report (JFA) | Haruki Ochiyama 9' | Stadium: NACK5 Stadium Omiya; Attendance: 1,080 |

| 29 December 2021 1 | Maebashi Ikuei | 4−0 | Kusatsu Higashi | Kumagaya |
| 12:05 | Rentaro Moriya 6', 74', 80+3'; Ryohei Watanabe 80+1' | Report (JFA); Report (JFA) | | Stadium: Kumagaya Athletic Stadium; Attendance: 2,598 |

| 29 December 2021 1 | RKU Kashiwa | 1−1 (4−5 p) | Kindai Wakayama | Chiba |
| 12:05 | Kyota Kobayashi 8' | Report (JFA); Report (JFA) | Kintaro Taniguchi 64' | Stadium: Fukuda Denshi Arena; Attendance: 2,139 |
| | Penalties |
| | Ryota Shibuya (penalty missed); Kuga Taguchi (penalty scored); Yota Matsumoto (penalty scored); Yuto Kawabata (penalty scored); Ryoya Nishioka (penalty scored); Sotaro Shimizu (penalty missed) | | (penalty scored) Aoi Hatashita; (penalty scored) Kosei Fujiki; (penalty scored) Ryodai Ishigaki; (penalty scored) Hiromu Tai; (penalty missed) Yusei Hiramatsu; (penalty scored) Koshin Araki |

| 29 December 2021 1 | Shizuoka Gakuen | 5−0 | Tokushima Shogyo | Chiba |
| 14:10 | Ryunosuke Koizumi 3'; Shinnosuke Ito 47'; Ryuta Takahashi 49'; Yosuke Furukawa 51'; Shunki Arai 57' | Report (JFA); Report (JFA) | | Stadium: Fukuda Denshi Arena; Attendance: 2,343 |

| 29 December 2021 1 | Shoshi | 0−0 (4−3 p) | Setouchi | Kashiwa |
| 12:05 | | Report (JFA); Report (JFA) | | Stadium: Kashiwanoha Stadium; Attendance: 2,209 |
| | Penalties |
| | Anrie Chase (penalty scored); Haruki Matsuo (penalty scored); Hayato Matsumoto (penalty scored); Ichita Hanya (penalty missed); Shota Takahashi (penalty scored) | | (penalty missed) Ryoma Sano; (penalty scored) Ryusuke Matsuura; (penalty scored) Kaede Egawa; (penalty scored) Dai Shohoji; (penalty missed) Ryang Jun-ho |

| 29 December 2021 1 | Teikyo Kani | 4−1 | Imabari Higashi | Kawasaki |
| 14:10 | Hiroto Hioki 32'; Yugo Matsunaga 40'; Shunsuke Miyauchi 43'; Naoya Mishina 76' | Report (JFA); Report (JFA) | | Stadium: Kawasaki Todoroki Stadium; Attendance: 2,689 |

| 29 December 2021 1 | Toko Gakuen | 1−0 | Nishihara | Kawasaki |
| 12:05 | Ryo Toyoda 53' | Report (JFA); Report (JFA) | | Stadium: Kawasaki Todoroki Stadium; Attendance: 2,189 |

| 29 December 2021 1 | Haguro | 1−2 | Okayama Gakugeikan | Yokohama |
| 12:05 | Haruta Arai 39' | Report (JFA); Report (JFA) | Tsukasa Inoue 56'; Ryota Yamaoka 78' | Stadium: NHK Spring Mitsuzawa Football Stadium; Attendance: 1,754 |

| 29 December 2021 1 | Seiryo | 2−4 | Takagawa Gakuen | Yokohama |
| 14:10 | Shingo Kawai 38'; Riku Yamashita 73' | Report (JFA); Report (JFA) | Haruki Hayashi 8', 78'; Keigo Nakayama 50', 79' | Stadium: NHK Spring Mitsuzawa Football Stadium; Attendance: 2,783 |

| 29 December 2021 1 | Hokkai | 1−2 | Nagasaki IAS | Setagaya |
| 12:05 | Ryoya Nishi 31' | Report (JFA); Report (JFA) | Fuga Beppu 40'; Kisei Haraguchi 78' | Stadium: Komazawa Olympic Park Stadium; Attendance: 2,064 |

| 29 December 2021 1 | Horikoshi | 2−1 | Kochi | Setagaya |
| 14:10 | Kiryu Furusawa 4', 20'; Shintaro Nishida 25' | Report (JFA); Report (JFA) | | Stadium: Komazawa Olympic Park Stadium; Attendance: 3,112 |

| 29 December 2021 1 | Senshu Kitakami | 2−4 | Nara Ikuei | Kita |
| 14:10 | Shuhei Toriyabe 22'; Shoki Abe 42' | Report (JFA); Report (JFA) | Seisho Yamao 8'; Taisei Okamoto 48'; Aiki Togai 49'; Shun Nishio 64' | Stadium: Ajinomoto Field Nishigaoka; Attendance: 1,311 |

| 29 December 2021 1 | Maruoka | 0−3 | Hannan | Kita |
| 12:05 | | Report (JFA); Report (JFA) | Hiroto Tanaka 13'; Kizuna Ishikawa 22'; Akito Suzuki 42' | Stadium: Ajinomoto Field Nishigaoka; Attendance: 1,108 |

=== Second round ===
| 31 December 2021 2 | Yamanashi Gakuin | 0−2 | Saga Higashi | Kumagaya |
| 12:05 | | Report (JFA); Report (JFA) | Ryuki Nakayama 3'; Takaya Mizoguchi 78' | Stadium: Kumagaya Athletic Stadium; Attendance: 2,850; Referee: Yu Tezuka |

| 31 December 2021 2 | Higashi Fukuoka | 0−4 | Ohzu | Kumagaya |
| 14:10 | | Report (JFA); Report (JFA) | Atsushi Kawaguchi 10', 48'; Rin Takahata 67'; Tsubasa Inada 80+4' | Stadium: Kumagaya Athletic Stadium; Attendance: 3,188; Referee: Yusuke Ohashi |

| 31 December 2021 2 | Mie | 0−6 | Maebashi Ikuei | Saitama |
| 12:05 | | Report (JFA); Report (JFA) | Naoya Koike 25', 52'; Shun Otake 35'; Ryohei Watanabe 56'; Tsubasa Kasayanagi 57'; Zen Takaashi 75' | Stadium: NACK5 Stadium Omiya; Attendance: 940; Referee: Yasuhiro Udagawa |

| 31 December 2021 2 | Kashima Gakuen | 2−0 | Takamatsu Shogyo | Saitama |
| 14:10 | Koei Ueno 40'; Naoki Matsumura 45' | Report (JFA); Report (JFA) | | Stadium: NACK5 Stadium Omiya; Attendance: 1,157; Referee: Tomoki Umeda |

| 31 December 2021 2 | Toyama Daiichi | 0−1 | Miyazaki Nihon | Chiba |
| 14:10 | | Report (JFA); Report (JFA) | Masahiro Toyama 73' | Stadium: Fukuda Denshi Arena; Attendance: 2,379; Referee: Takuya Ogiwara |

| 31 December 2021 2 | Kindai Wakayama | 0−1 | Shizuoka Gakuen | Chiba |
| 12:05 | | Report (JFA); Report (JFA) | Ryunosuke Koizumi 66' | Stadium: Fukuda Denshi Arena; Attendance: 2,241; Referee: Kazuyoshi Karashima |

| 31 December 2021 2 | Shoshi | 0−0 (5−6 p) | Kanto Daiichi | Kashiwa |
| 12:05 | | Report (JFA); Report (JFA) | | Stadium: Kashiwanoha Stadium; Attendance: 2,803; Referee: Yuichi Hanakawa |
| | Penalties |
| | Anrie Chase (penalty scored); Toshiaki Sato (penalty missed); Haruto Koike (penalty scored); Hayato Matsumoto (penalty scored); Taiki Kusano (penalty scored); Shota Takahashi (penalty scored); Kazuma Shinya (penalty missed) | | (penalty missed) Haruto Horii; (penalty scored) Rin Homma; (penalty scored) Kota Sakai; (penalty scored) Hinata Fujii; (penalty scored) Kento Ikeda; (penalty scored) Renji Hidano; (penalty scored) Taisei Yabata |

| 31 December 2021 2 | Yonago Kita | 2−2 (2−3 p) | Yaita Chuo | Kashiwa |
| 14:10 | Hideto Fukuda 35'; Genta Yamada 80+1' | Report (JFA); Report (JFA) | Shunta Kataoka 57'; Kazuya Fujino 64' | Stadium: Kashiwanoha Stadium; Attendance: 3,115; Referee: Yoshihito Hori |
| | Penalties |
| | Kodai Sano (penalty scored); Yoshihito Ebinuma (penalty scored); Atsushi Hashimoto (penalty missed); Kaito Kobashigawa (penalty missed); Shinnosuke Suzuki (penalty missed) | | (penalty scored) Kazuya Fujino; (penalty missed) Rinsei Ohata; (penalty scored) Shunta Kataoka; (penalty scored) Kagetora Hoshi |

| 31 December 2021 2 | Teikyo Nagaoka | 3−2 | Kamimura Gakuen | Kawasaki |
| 14:10 | Yuto Watanabe 16', 32'; Ryotaro Miyake 58' | Report (JFA); Report (JFA) | Shio Fukuda 44'; Riki Sato 76' | Stadium: Kawasaki Todoroki Stadium; Attendance: 2,483; Referee: Masashi Harada |

| 31 December 2021 2 | Teikyo Kani | 1−1 (6−7 p) | Toko Gakuen | Kawasaki |
| 12:05 | Yugo Matsunaga 61' | Report (JFA); Report (JFA) | Kanki Kawasumi 71' | Stadium: Kawasaki Todoroki Stadium; Attendance: 1,696; Referee: Koji Takasaki |
| | Penalties |
| | Junnosuke Suzuki (penalty scored); Rei Kumazawa (penalty scored); Naoya Mishina (penalty scored); Tsukasa Utsunomiya (penalty scored); Yugo Matsunaga (penalty scored); Kantaro Itoigawa (penalty scored); Hiroto Hioki (penalty missed) | | (penalty scored) Hayato Mihara; (penalty scored) Kodai Terauchi; (penalty scored) Takumi Baba; (penalty scored) Yuki Yoneyama; (penalty scored) Shuto Yamaichi; (penalty scored) Hideyasu Tanaka; (penalty scored) Ryo Toyoda |

| 31 December 2021 2 | Okayama Gakugeikan | 1−2 | Takagawa Gakuen | Yokohama |
| 12:05 | Ryota Yamaoka 11' | Report (JFA); Report (JFA) | Haruki Hayashi 51'; Keigo Nakayama 60' | Stadium: NHK Spring Mitsuzawa Football Stadium; Attendance: 2,057; Referee: Tatsuya Sakai |

| 31 December 2021 2 | Sendai Gakuen | 2−1 | Takigawa Daini | Yokohama |
| 14:10 | Ryo Sato 62', 75' | Report (JFA); Report (JFA) | Sogo Shimada 80+2' | Stadium: NHK Spring Mitsuzawa Football Stadium; Attendance: 2,891; Referee: Kei Suzuki |

| 31 December 2021 2 | Ichiritsu Nagano | 0−2 | Higashiyama | Kita |
| 12:05 | | Report (JFA); Report (JFA) | Reiya Sakata 10'; Daiki Oda 43' | Stadium: Ajinomoto Field Nishigaoka; Attendance: 1,045; Referee: Shingo Kuniyoshi |

| 31 December 2021 2 | Nagasaki IAS | 1−0 | Horikoshi | Setagaya |
| 14:10 | Kisei Haraguchi 61' | Report (JFA); Report (JFA) | | Stadium: Komazawa Olympic Park Stadium; Attendance: 3,190; Referee: Takamasa Funahashi |

| 31 December 2021 2 | Nara Ikuei | 0−8 | Hannan | Kita |
| 14:10 | | Report (JFA); Report (JFA) | Kizuna Ishikawa 18', 45'; Hiroto Tanaka 25'; Akito Suzuki 28', 38', 40+3', 60', 64' | Stadium: Ajinomoto Field Nishigaoka; Attendance: 1,284; Referee: Yuki Tanabe |

| 31 December 2021 2 | Taisha | 0−6 | Aomori Yamada | Setagaya |
| 12:05 | | Report (JFA); Report (JFA) | Masaki Nasukawa 43'; Yumezumi Tazawa 53'; Kuryu Matsuki 60'; Tsuna Kominato 78', 80+3'; Zento Uno 80+1' | Stadium: Komazawa Olympic Park Stadium; Attendance: 2,855; Referee: Yoshimi Yamashita |

=== Third round ===
| 2 January 2022 3 | Ohzu | 3−1 | Saga Higashi | Kumagaya |
| 14:10 | Shunei Kobayashi 28'; Rin Takahata 67'; Asuma Ikari 80+4' | Report (JFA); Report (JFA) | Yuto Morita 71' | Stadium: Kumagaya Athletic Stadium; Attendance: 3,119; Referee: Koji Takasaki |

| 2 January 2022 3 | Kashima Gakuen | 1−2 | Maebashi Ikuei | Kumagaya |
| 12:05 | Yuito Hayashi 62' | Report (JFA); Report (JFA) | Zen Takaashi 57', 79' | Stadium: Kumagaya Athletic Stadium; Attendance: 3,029; Referee: Kazuyoshi Karashima |

| 2 January 2022 3 | Shizuoka Gakuen | 8−0 | Miyazaki Nihon | Chiba |
| 12:05 | Nagi Kawatani 9', 35'; Sota Matsunaga 12', 40'; Yosuke Furukawa 32'; Shuya Kikuchi 33'; Rio Hyeon 72'; Kyosuke Mochiyama 79' | Report (JFA); Report (JFA) | | Stadium: Fukuda Denshi Arena; Attendance: 2,229; Referee: Kohei Yano |

| 2 January 2022 3 | Yaita Chuo | 2−3 | Kanto Daiichi | Chiba |
| 14:10 | Katsuya Shimazaki 24'; ? 47' (o.g.) | Report (JFA); Report (JFA) | Renji Hidano 6'; Ayumu Wakamatsu 27'; Rin Homma 78' | Stadium: Fukuda Denshi Arena; Attendance: 2,269; Referee: Taku Hase |

| 2 January 2022 3 | Teikyo Nagaoka | 1−1 (3−5 p) | Toko Gakuen | Kawasaki |
| 12:05 | Konosuke Takehara 23' | Report (JFA); Report (JFA) | Yuki Yoneyama 63' | Stadium: Kawasaki Todoroki Stadium; Attendance: 2,164; Referee: Yuichi Hanakawa |
| | Penalties |
| | Sere Matsumura (penalty scored); Ryotaro Miyake (penalty missed); Ryusei Nemoto (penalty scored); Naru Sasaki (penalty scored) | | (penalty scored) Hayato Mihara; (penalty scored) Kodai Terauchi; (penalty scored) Takumi Baba; (penalty scored) Yuki Yoneyama; (penalty scored) Shuto Yamaichi |

| 2 January 2022 3 | Takagawa Gakuen | 1−0 | Sendai Ikuei Gakuen | Kawasaki |
| 14:10 | Kazuya Nishizawa 80+3' | Report (JFA); Report (JFA) | | Stadium: Kawasaki Todoroki Stadium; Attendance: 2,267; Referee: Yoshimi Yamashita |

| 2 January 2022 3 | Higashiyama | 3−0 | Nagasaki IAS | Setagaya |
| 14:10 | Kosuke Fujieda 29', 79'; Toa Ashitani 63' | Report (JFA); Report (JFA) | | Stadium: Komazawa Olympic Park Stadium; Attendance: 3,140; Referee: Yoshihito Hori |

| 2 January 2022 3 | Aomori Yamada | 3−1 | Hannan | Setagaya |
| 12:05 | 15' (o.g.); Yamato Maruyama 43'; Masaki Nasukawa 52' | Report (JFA); Report (JFA) | Akito Suzuki 59' | Stadium: Komazawa Olympic Park Stadium; Attendance: 2,803; Referee: Yusuke Ohashi |

=== Quarter-finals ===
| 4 January 2022 4 | Ohzu | 1−0 | Maebashi Ikuei | Chiba |
| 12:05 | Seren Ichimura 11' | Report (JFA); Report (JFA) | | Stadium: Fukuda Denshi Arena; Attendance: 1,989; Referee: Koki Nagamine |

| 4 January 2022 4 | Shizuoka Gakuen | 1−1 (3−4 p) | Kanto Daiichi | Chiba |
| 14:10 | Ryunosuke Koizumi 60' | Report (JFA); Report (JFA) | Kota Sakai 80' | Stadium: Fukuda Denshi Arena; Attendance: 2,267; Referee: Shingo Kuniyoshi |
| | Penalties |
| | Shinnosuke Ito (penalty scored); Yosuke Furukawa (penalty missed); Yushi Nishimura (penalty missed); Kaito Nomura (penalty scored); Kyosuke Mochiyama (penalty scored) | | (penalty scored) Haruto Horii; (penalty scored) Sora Kusaka; (penalty missed) Kota Sakai; (penalty scored) Hinata Fujii; (penalty scored) Kento Ikeda |

| 4 January 2022 4 | Toko Gakuen | 0−1 | Takagawa Gakuen | Kawasaki |
| 14:10 | | Report (JFA); Report (JFA) | Kazuya Nishizawa 55' | Stadium: Kawasaki Todoroki Stadium; Attendance: 2,491; Referee: Tomokazu Sato |

| 4 January 2022 4 | Higashiyama | 1−2 | Aomori Yamada | Kawasaki |
| 12:05 | Daiki Uda 16' | Report (JFA); Report (JFA) | Kuryu Matsuki 40+2'; Sera Watanabe 53' | Stadium: Kawasaki Todoroki Stadium; Attendance: 2,456; Referee: Tatsuya Sakai |

=== Semi-finals ===
| 8 January 2022 5 | Ohzu | 3−0 (W.O) | Kanto Daiichi |
| | | Report (JFA) |
Note: Due to the two positive tests for COVID-19 in the Kanto Daiichi team (despite no other team members being cited or confirmed with an unwell physical condition), the club decided to withdraw from the tournament. An alternative proposal to bring the pre-registered players (14 players and team members who wasn't part of the official team) instead of the official team (including the 30 players and team officers) was rejected by relevant parties involved.

| 8 January 2022 5 | Takagawa Gakuen | 0−6 | Aomori Yamada | Shinjuku |
| 14:20 | | Report (JFA); Report (JFA) | Masaki Nasukawa 3'; Yamato Maruyama 26', 85'; Kuryu Matsuki 57'; Tsuna Kominato 68'; Eisei Tanaka 89' | Stadium: Japan National Stadium; Attendance: 18,599; Referee: Shuhei Shimizu |

=== Final ===
10 January 2022
14:10

| Ohzu | 0−4 | Aomori Yamada |
|---|---|---|
| | Report (JFA); Report (JFA) | Yamato Maruyama 37'; Sodai Nasukawa 41'; Kuryu Matsuki 55'; Sera Watanabe 78' |

Japan National Stadium, Shinjuku
Attendance: 42,747
Referee: Takafumi Mikuriya

| Ohzu | Aomori Yamada |

| GK | 1 | (Japan) Ryusei Sato |
| DF | 2 | (Japan) Rio Wada | (substituted off) 76' |
| DF | 3 | (Japan) Haruto Hidaka | (substituted off) 40' |
| DF | 4 | (Japan) Taiki Kawazoe |
| DF | 5 | (Japan) Junichiro Teraoka |
| DF | 12 | (Japan) Shotaro Iwamoto |
| MF | 6 | (Japan) Rei Yakushida |
| MF | 7 | (Japan) Atsushi Kawaguchi | (substituted off) 69' |
| MF | 10 | (Japan) Daichi Morita (c) |
| FW | 9 | (Japan) Shunei Kobayashi |
| FW | 11 | (Japan) Seren Ichimura |
Substitutes:
| GK | 16 | (Japan) Yuta Mori |
| DF | 23 | (Japan) Togo Sakata | (substituted on) 76' |
| MF | 8 | (Japan) Asuma Ikari |
| MF | 13 | (Japan) Ayumu Sato |
| MF | 14 | (Japan) Rui Tabaru | (substituted on) 40' |
| MF | 15 | (Japan) Osuke Miyakawa |
| MF | 17 | (Japan) No Shoei |
| MF | 28 | (Japan) Tsubasa Inada |
| FW | 19 | (Japan) Rin Takahata | (substituted on) 69' |
Manager:
(Japan) Tomohiro Yamashiro

| GK | 1 | (Japan) Koki Numata |
| DF | 3 | (Japan) Ryosuke Nakayama | (substituted off) 88' |
| DF | 4 | (Japan) Ryohei Miwa |
| DF | 5 | (Japan) Yamato Maruyama |
| DF | 14 | (Japan) Hikaru Ono |
| MF | 6 | (Japan) Zento Uno |
| MF | 10 | (Japan) Kuryu Matsuki (c) |
| MF | 11 | (Japan) Sota Fujimori | (substituted off) 88' |
| MF | 16 | (Japan) Yumezu Tazawa | (substituted off) 84' |
| FW | 9 | (Japan) Masaki Nasukawa | (substituted off) 84' |
| FW | 17 | (Japan) Sera Watanabe | (substituted off) 78' |
Substitutes:
| GK | 12 | (Japan) Hiroshi Suzuki |
| DF | 2 | (Japan) Taiyo Oto | (substituted on) 88' |
| DF | 13 | (Japan) Minami Fukuda |
| DF | 19 | (Japan) Yuya Abe |
| MF | 7 | (Japan) Yoshitaka Obara | (substituted on) 78' |
| MF | 8 | (Japan) Manato Honda | (substituted on) 84' |
| MF | 15 | (Japan) Eisei Tanaka | (substituted on) 88' |
| MF | 20 | (Japan) Ritsuki Terada |
| FW | 18 | (Japan) Tsuna Kominato | (substituted on) 84' |
Manager:
(Japan) Go Kuroda

Assistant referees:
Osamu Akasaka
Soichi Iwasaki
Fourth official:
Takahito Seta

Match rules

- 90 minutes.
- Penalty shoot-out if scores still level.
- Nine named substitutes.
- Maximum of five substitutions.

== Top scorers ==
| Rank | Player | High School | Goals |
|---|---|---|---|
| 1 | (Japan) Akito Suzuki | Hannan | 7 |
| 2 | (Japan) Yamato Maruyama | Aomori Yamada | 4 |
| 2 | (Japan) Kuryu Matsuki | Aomori Yamada | 4 |
| 2 | (Japan) Masaki Nasukawa | Aomori Yamada | 4 |
| 5 | (Japan) Haruki Hayashi | Takagawa Gakuen | 3 |
| 5 | (Japan) Kizuna Ishikawa | Hannan | 3 |
| 5 | (Japan) Ryunosuke Koizumi | Shizuoka Gakuen | 3 |
| 5 | (Japan) Tsuna Kominato | Aomori Yamada | 3 |
| 5 | (Japan) Rentaro Moriya | Maebashi Ikuei | 3 |
| 5 | (Japan) Keigo Nakayama | Takagawa Gakuen | 3 |
| 5 | (Japan) Zen Takaashi | Maebashi Ikuei | 3 |

== Selected best players ==
The following 37 players featured in the Tournament's Best Players Squad:

| Pos. | Player | High School | Grade | Moved to |
|---|---|---|---|---|
| GK | Koki Numata | Aomori Yamada | 3rd | Aoyama Gakuin University |
| GK | Aoto Tokuwaka | Takagawa Gakuen | 3rd | Kyoto Sangyo University |
| GK | Ryusei Sato | Ohzu | 3rd | University of Tsukuba |
| DF | Ryohei Miwa | Aomori Yamada | 3rd | Juntendo University |
| DF | Yamato Maruyama | Aomori Yamada | 3rd | Tokai University |
| DF | Kento Ikeda | Kanto Daiichi | 3rd | FC Arrows |
| DF | Taiki Kawazoe | Ohzu | 3rd | Fukuoka University |
| DF | Shota Yagiu | Maebashi Ikuei | 3rd | Senshu University |
| DF | Takumi Baba | Toko Gakuen | 3rd | Doshisha University |
| DF | Rikuto Shintani | Higashiyama | 2nd | Higashiyama |
| DF | Anrie Chase | Shoshi | 3rd | (Germany) VfB Stuttgart |
| MF | Zento Uno | Aomori Yamada | 3rd | Machida Zelvia |
| MF | Kuryu Matsuki | Aomori Yamada | 3rd | FC Tokyo |
| MF | Sota Fujimori | Aomori Yamada | 3rd | Meiji University |
| MF | Renji Hidano | Kanto Daiichi | 3rd | Toin University of Yokohama |
| MF | Haruki Hayashi | Takagawa Gakuen | 3rd | Meiji University |
| MF | Rei Yakushida | Ohzu | 3rd | Hosei University |
| MF | Atsushi Kawaguchi | Ohzu | 3rd | Juntendo University |

| Pos. | Player | High School | Grade | Moved to |
|---|---|---|---|---|
| MF | Daichi Morita | Ohzu | 3rd | Waseda University |
| MF | Genki Nezu | Maebashi Ikuei | 2nd | Maebashi Ikuei |
| MF | Tsubasa Kasayanagi | Maebashi Ikuei | 3rd | V-Varen Nagasaki |
| MF | Ryo Tokunaga | Maebashi Ikuei | 2nd | Maebashi Ikuei |
| MF | Shuto Yamaichi | Toko Gakuen | 3rd | Waseda University |
| MF | Ryunosuke Koizumi | Shizuoka Gakuen | 3rd | Takushoku University |
| MF | Rio Hyeon | Shizuoka Gakuen | 3rd | Tokushima Vortis |
| MF | Yosuke Furukawa | Shizuoka Gakuen | 3rd | Júbilo Iwata |
| MF | Reiya Sakata | Higashiyama | 2nd | Higashiyama |
| MF | Jimpei Yoshida | Saga Higashi | 3rd | Albirex Niigata |
| MF | Junnosuke Suzuki | Teikyo Kani | 3rd | Shonan Bellmare |
| FW | Masaki Nasukawa | Aomori Yamada | 3rd | Juntendo University |
| FW | Rin Homma | Kanto Daiichi | 2nd | Kanto Daiichi |
| FW | Keigo Nakayama | Takagawa Gakuen | 3rd | Fukuoka University |
| FW | Shunei Kobayashi | Ohzu | 2nd | Ohzu |
| FW | Hayato Mihara | Toko Gakuen | 3rd | Meiji Gakuin University |
| FW | Sota Matsunaga | Shizuoka Gakuen | 3rd | Ryutsu Keizai University |
| FW | Akito Suzuki | Hannan | 3rd | Shonan Bellmare |
| FW | Shiō Fukuda | Kamimura Gakuen | 2nd | Kamimura Gakuen |

== Joining J.League clubs on 2022 ==
| Pos. | Player | Moving from | Moving to | League |
|---|---|---|---|---|
| DF | Shinnosuke Ito | Maebashi Ikuei | Giravanz Kitakyushu | J3 |
| DF | Kazuma Okamoto | Maebashi Ikuei | Thespakusatsu Gunma | J2 |
| DF | Sere Matsumura | Teikyo Nagaoka | Shonan Bellmare | J1 |
| MF | Yosuke Furukawa | Shizuoka Gakuen | Júbilo Iwata | J1 |
| MF | Tsubasa Kasayanagi | Maebashi Ikuei | V-Varen Nagasaki | J2 |
| MF | Nagi Kawatani | Shizuoka Gakuen | Shimizu S-Pulse | J1 |
| MF | Kuryu Matsuki | Aomori Yamada | FC Tokyo | J1 |
| MF | Rio Hyeon | Shizuoka Gakuen | Tokushima Vortis | J2 |
| MF | Kodai Sano | Yonago Kita | Fagiano Okayama | J2 |
| MF | Junnosuke Suzuki | Teikyo Kani | Shonan Bellmare | J1 |
| MF | Zento Uno | Aomori Yamada | Machida Zelvia | J2 |
| MF | Jimpei Yoshida | Saga Higashi | Albirex Niigata | J2 |
