= Tomizawa =

Tomizawa (written: 富沢 or 富澤) is a Japanese surname. Notable people with the surname include:

- Hidehiko Tomizawa (冨沢 英彦, born 1946), Japanese high jumper
- Hitoshi Tomizawa (富沢 ひとし), Japanese manga artist
- Kiyoshi Tomizawa (富沢 清司, born 1943), Japanese footballer
- Makoto Tomizawa (富沢 慎, born 1984), Japanese windsurfer
- Masaya Tomizawa (富澤 雅也, born 1993), Japanese footballer
- Michie Tomizawa (富沢 美智恵, born 1961), Japanese voice actress and singer
- Shoya Tomizawa (富沢 祥也, 1990–2010), Japanese motorcycle racer
- Takeshi Tomizawa (富澤 岳史, born 1974), Japanese comedian and actor

== See also ==
- Tomizawa Station, a metro station in Sendai, Miyagi Prefecture, Japan
