= Masuya =

Masuya (written: 桝屋 or 増矢) is a Japanese surname. Notable people with the surname include:

- Keigo Masuya (桝屋 敬悟, born 1951), Japanese politician
- Rika Masuya (増矢 理花, born 1995), Japanese footballer

== See also ==
- Masaya (given name)
