= Masaya (disambiguation) =

Masaya is a city in Nicaragua.

Masaya may also refer to:

== Places ==
- Masaya Department in Nicaragua
- Masaya Volcano in Nicaragua

== Other uses ==
- Masaya (given name)
- SS Masaya, an America cargo ship sunk during World War II
- Tapfumaneyi Masaya, Zimbabwean bishop and political activist
