= Raiju Obuchi =

Japanese footballer (born 2003)

Personal information
- Date of birth: 21 July 2003 (age 23)
- Place of birth: Fukuoka, Japan
- Height: 1.67 m (5 ft 6 in)
- Position: Midfielder

Team information
- Current team: Tegevajaro Miyazaki (on loan from V-Varen Nagasaki)
- Number: 23

Youth career
- 2011–2018: Sagan Tosu
- 2019: Pleasure SC
- 2020: Cerezo Osaka
- 2021–2022: Higashi Fukuoka HS

Senior career*
Years	Team	Apps	(Gls)
2020	Cerezo Osaka U-23	1	(0)
2023–	V-Varen Nagasaki	0	(0)
2024–	Tegevajaro Miyazaki (loan)	8	(0)
- * Club domestic league appearances and goals as of 22:12, 23 September 2024

Raiju Obuchi (大渕 来珠, Obuchi Raiju; born 21 July 2003) is a Japanese footballer currently playing as a midfielder for Tegevajaro Miyazaki on loan from V-Varen Nagasaki.

== Career ==
=== Early career ===
Born in the Fukuoka Prefecture, Obuchi began his career with Saga Prefecture-based side Sagan Tosu, before a short spell with amateur side Pleasure SC. Having joined Cerezo Osaka, he was registered as a type 2 player in October 2020, making him eligible to represent the club in the J.League.

=== High school ===
After one appearance in the J3 League with Cerezo Osaka's under-23 side, Obuchi left the club to enrol at the Higashi Fukuoka High School, stating that it was his dream to play high school football. Having joined the high school squad on 7 March, he immediately established himself in the team, featuring at the Funabashi Invitational under-18 Tournament in the same month.

Obuchi starred in qualification to the 2021 All Japan High School Soccer Tournament, scoring a decisive goal against the Iizuka High School in a 2–1 win. Despite his side exiting the competition in the second round, he was noted as a stand-out player. Ahead of the 2022 All Japan High School Soccer Tournament the next year, it was announced that Obuchi would join J2 League side V-Varen Nagasaki in 2023, following his graduation.

=== Professional ===
Having joined V-Varen Nagasaki in early 2023, Obuchi struggled to establish himself in the team, and by June he had only featured briefly in the Emperor's Cup. In January 2024, he joined J3 League side Tegevajaro Miyazaki on a season-long loan.

== Career statistics ==
=== Club ===
As of 23 September 2024.

Appearances and goals by club, season and competition
Club	Season	League			National Cup		League Cup		Other		Total	
Club	Season	Division	Apps	Goals	Apps	Goals	Apps	Goals	Apps	Goals	Apps	Goals
Cerezo Osaka U-23	2020	J3 League	1	0	–		–		0	0	1	0
V-Varen Nagasaki	2023	J2 League	0	0	1 (Note: Appearances in the Emperor's Cup)	0	0	0	0	0	1	0
V-Varen Nagasaki	2024	J2 League	0	0	0	0	0	0	0	0	0	0
V-Varen Nagasaki	Total		0	0	1	0	0	0	0	0	1	0
Tegevajaro Miyazaki (loan)	2024	J3 League	8	0	0	0	1 (Note: Appearances in the J.League Cup)	0	0	0	9	0
Career total			9	0	1	0	1	0	0	0	11	0
