= 2022 All Japan High School Soccer Tournament =

Tournament details
- Country: Japan
- Dates: 28 December 2022 – 9 January 2023
- Teams: 48

Final positions
- Champions: Okayama Gakugeikan (1st title)
- Runners-up: Higashiyama

Tournament statistics
- Matches played: 47
- Goals scored: 131 (2.79 per match)
- Top goal scorer: 5 players tied

The 2022 All Japan High School Soccer Tournament (第101回全国高等学校サッカー選手権大会; All Japan JFA 101st High School Soccer Tournament) marked the 101st edition of the referred annually contested cup for High Schools over Japan, won by Okayama Gakugeikan after a 3–1 win over Higashiyama on the Final, which was the first high school from Okayama to ever win the competition.

As usual, the tournament was contested by all 48 winning schools of their respective prefectural qualifications. Tokyo's qualification tournament was the only one out of the 47 to qualify two high school teams for the tournament. The metropolitan area was also given the rights to host the final, scheduled to be played at the Japan National Stadium, in Shinjuku. Aomori Yamada were the defending champions, winning the previous championship by 4–0 against Ohzu, which rewarded a scoreful and eventful campaign throughout the 2021 tournament.

As usual, from the first round to the quarterfinals, the matches had a duration of 80 minutes, split into two halves of 40 minutes each. The semi-finals and the final had matches lasting 90 minutes, the standard match length on professional football. During the tournament, if a match should be tied, it would directly require penalty shoot-outs, except for the final, where overtime would be played if the match were tied for 90 minutes. All the matches were digitally broadcast on TVer and SPORTS BULL. In Japan, the competition has this year, in total, 43 official broadcasters. The semi-finals and the final were broadcast on NTV.

== Calendar ==
The tournament took place in a 13-day span, with the tournament split into a total of 6 stages. The draw was conducted on 21 November 2022 by the JFA, deciding the tournament schedule and the match pairings.

Round	Date	Matches	Clubs
First round	28 and 29 December 2022	16	32 (32) → 16
Second round	31 December 2022	16	32 (16+16) → 16
Third round	2 January 2023	8	16 → 8
Quarter-finals	4 January 2023	4	8 → 4
Semi-finals	7 January 2023	2	4 → 2
Final	9 January 2023	1	2 → 1

== Venues ==
The tournament was held in 4 prefectures and 9 stadiums. In Kanagawa, Chiba, and Saitama prefectures, two venues are located in each, while three are located in Tokyo. The venues are:

- Tokyo – Japan National Stadium, Komazawa Olympic Park Stadium and Ajinomoto Field Nishigaoka
- Kanagawa – Kawasaki Todoroki Stadium and NHK Spring Mitsuzawa Football Stadium
- Saitama – Urawa Komaba Stadium and NACK5 Stadium Omiya
- Chiba – Kashiwanoha Stadium and ZA Oripri Stadium

== Participating clubs ==
Prefecture	High School	Apps.	Ref	Kit manufacturer
Hokkaido	Hokkai High School	12th		(Germany) Puma
Aomori	Aomori Yamada High School	28th		(United States) Under Armour
Iwate	Morioka Shogyo High School	17th		(Japan) Asics
Miyagi	Seiwa Gakuen High School	5th		(Brazil) Athleta
Akita	North Asia Univ. Meioh High School	5th		(Brazil) Athleta
Yamagata	Haguro High School	9th		(Germany) Adidas
Fukushima	Shoshi High School	13th		(Germany) Puma
Ibaraki	Kashima Gakuen High School	11th		(Germany) Adidas
Tochigi	Sano Nihon Univ. High School	9th		(Germany) Adidas
Yamanashi	Yamanashi Gakuin High School	9th		(Japan) Asics
Gunma	Maebashi Ikuei High School	25th		(Germany) Puma
Saitama	Shohei High School	5th		(United States) New Balance
Chiba	NSSU Kashiwa High School	1st		(Japan) Mizuno
Tokyo A	Kokugakuin Univ. Kugayama High School	9th		(Japan) SVOLME
Tokyo B	Seiritsu Gakuen High School	17th		(Germany) Adidas
Kanagawa	Nihon Univ. Fujisawa High School	6th		(Japan) Mizuno
Nagano	Matsumoto Kokusai High School	5th		(United States) Under Armour
Niigata	Nihon Bunri High School	5th		(England) Umbro
Toyama	Toyama Daiichi High School	33rd		(Germany) Puma
Ishikawa	Seiryo High School	31st		(Germany) Puma
Fukui	Maruoka High School	33rd		(Germany) Puma
Shizuoka	Hamamatsu Kaiseikan High School	4th		(Germany) Puma
Aichi	Toho High School	7th		(United States) Nike
Mie	Tsu Kogyo High School	3rd		(Japan) Mizuno

Prefecture	High School	Apps.	Ref	Kit manufacturer
Gifu	Teikyo Univ. Kani High School	9th		(Japan) SVOLME
Shiga	Ohmi High School	2nd		(Brazil) Athleta
Kyoto	Higashiyama High School	5th		(Japan) Asics
Osaka	Riseisha High School	4th		(Germany) Puma
Hyōgo	Ashiya Gakuen High School	1st		(Brazil) Athleta
Nara	Nara Ikuei High School	15th		(Germany) Puma
Wakayama	Kindai Univ. Wakayama High School	9th		(United States) New Balance
Tottori	Yonago Kita High School	18th		(Germany) Puma
Shimane	Rissho Univ. Shonan High School	19th		(Germany) Puma
Okayama	Okayama Gakugeikan High School	5th		(Germany) Puma
Hiroshima	Hiroshima Minami High School	17th		(Japan) Asics
Yamaguchi	Takagawa Gakuen High School	28th		(Germany) Puma
Kagawa	Kagawa Nishi High School	12th		(Japan) Mizuno
Tokushima	Tokushima Ichiritsu High School	19th		(Germany) Puma
Ehime	Teikyo Daigo High School	1st		(Japan) Acuore
Kōchi	Kochi High School	18th		(Japan) Desporte
Fukuoka	Iizuka High School	1st		(Germany) Puma
Saga	Ryukoku High School	3rd		(Japan) Mizuno
Nagasaki	Kunimi High School	24th		(United States) Nike
Kumamoto	Ohzu High School	19th		(Germany) Puma
Ōita	Oita High School	12th		(Japan) SVOLME
Miyazaki	Nissho Gakuen High School	16th		(Japan) Mizuno
Kagoshima	Kamimura Gakuen High School	10th		(Germany) Puma
Okinawa	Nishihara High School	5th		(Japan) Mizuno

== Schedule ==
The schedule was announced on 21 November 2022, after the draw was conducted by the JFA, following the completion of the competition's prefectural qualifications.

=== First round ===
28 December 2022 Match 1	Seiritsu Gakuen (Tokyo)	3–2	(Mie Prefecture) Tsu Kogyo	Tokyo
15:00	Minoru Jinda 35'; Yura Sato 40'; Gen Watanabe 44'	Report (JFA); Report (JFA)	Manta Masuyama 61'; Koki Narukawa 73'	Stadium: Japan National Stadium; Attendance: 9,931; Referee: Koji Takasaki

29 December 2022 Match 2	Shoshi (Fukushima Prefecture)	3–0	(Tokushima Prefecture) Tokushima Ichiritsu	Saitama
12:05	Hiyu Ajiro 11', 70'; Rao Okano 73'	Report (JFA); Report (JFA)		Stadium: NHK Spring Mitsuzawa Football Stadium; Attendance: 2,623; Referee: Masakazu Kato

29 December 2022 Match 3	Hokkai (Hokkaido)	1–1 (5–6 p)	(Nagasaki Prefecture) Kunimi	Saitama
14:10	Taira Sakuraba 67'	Report (JFA); Report (JFA)	Yuri Toshine 37'	Stadium: NHK Spring Mitsuzawa Football Stadium; Attendance: 3,911; Referee: Kazuyoshi Karashima
	Penalties
	Taira Sakuraba (penalty scored); Hayato Tanaka (penalty scored); Haruki Omori (penalty missed); Koki Nomura (penalty scored); Haruki Matsunaga (penalty scored); Taiga Chiba (penalty scored); Nagito Kaneta (penalty missed)		(penalty missed) Kazuma Kitamura; (penalty scored) Yuri Toshine; (penalty scored) Taiyo Hirata; (penalty scored) Kazuto Murata; (penalty scored) Hinata Ueda; (penalty scored) Yuto Wada; (penalty scored) Makito Nishiyama

29 December 2022 Match 4	Nihon Fujisawa (Kanagawa Prefecture)	2–0	(Okinawa Prefecture) Nishihara	Kawasaki
12:05	Yosuke Morishige 13', 43'	Report (JFA); Report (JFA)		Stadium: Kawasaki Todoroki Stadium; Attendance: 4,599; Referee: Yoshihito Hori

29 December 2022 Match 5	Matsumoto Kokusai (Nagano Prefecture)	1–2	(Tottori Prefecture) Yonago Kita	Kawasaki
14:10	Takuto Kishi 71'	Report (JFA); Report (JFA)	Sota Uehara 40+2'; Yuito Nakai 73'	Stadium: Kawasaki Todoroki Stadium; Attendance: 5,795; Referee: Tomoya Suzuki

29 December 2022 Match 6	Morioka Shogyo (Iwate Prefecture)	2–1	(Ehime Prefecture) Teikyo Daigo	Saitama
14:10	Hayato Tsukiori 55'; Yuta Harada 63'	Report (JFA); Report (JFA)	Nozomi Higuchi 49'	Stadium: Urawa Komaba Stadium; Attendance: 3,069; Referee: Yu Tezuka

29 December 2022 Match 7	Toho (Aichi Prefecture)	1–4	(Osaka Prefecture) Riseisha	Saitama
12:05	Park Se-gi 80+2'	Report (JFA); Report (JFA)	Kazunosuke Furuta 19'; Yuki Odamura 35'; Toya Myogan 69'; Ibuki Morita 78'	Stadium: Urawa Komaba Stadium; Attendance: 1,579; Referee: Shingo Kuniyoshi

29 December 2022 Match 8	Kashima Gakuen (Ibaraki Prefecture)	2–1	(Saga Prefecture) Ryukoku	Tokyo
14:10	Yuito Hayashi 4'; Kodai Wakano 8'	Report (JFA); Report (JFA)	Yusei Konno 51'	Stadium: Komazawa Olympic Park Stadium; Attendance: 3,172; Referee: Takeshi Tsukahara

29 December 2022 Match 9	Teikyo Kani (Gifu Prefecture)	0–1	(Okayama Prefecture) Okayama Gakugeikan	Tokyo
12:05		Report (JFA); Report (JFA)	Shin Fukui 44'	Stadium: Komazawa Olympic Park Stadium; Attendance: 2,048; Referee: Masashi Harada

29 December 2022 Match 10	Seiryo (Ishikawa Prefecture)	1–2	(Kyoto Prefecture) Higashiyama	Ichihara
12:05	Hyugo Oki 63'	Report (JFA); Report (JFA)	Reo Toyoshima 21', 57'	Stadium: ZA Oripri Stadium; Attendance: 2,578; Referee: Tatsuya Sakai

29 December 2022 Match 11	Seiwa Gakuen (Miyagi Prefecture)	2–0	(Ōita Prefecture) Oita	Ichihara
14:10	Taiga Tobaru 48'; Ryuga Muroki 52'	Report (JFA); Report (JFA)		Stadium: ZA Oripri Stadium; Attendance: 4,200; Referee: Nozomi Osada

29 December 2022 Match 12	Maruoka (Fukui Prefecture)	1–1 (6–5 p)	(Kōchi Prefecture) Kochi	Kashiwa
14:10	Haruto Ozeki 22'	Report (JFA); Report (JFA)	Soma Kadota 53'	Stadium: Kashiwanoha Stadium; Attendance: 3,825; Referee: Ryo Munakata
	Penalties
	Shunki Oka (penalty scored); Haruto Ozeki (penalty scored); Yuto Nakagawa (penalty scored); Kenta Yamada (penalty scored); Minato Tokuyama (penalty scored); Ryuki Washimi (penalty scored)		(penalty scored) Soma Kadota; (penalty scored) Shota Nambu; (penalty scored) Takumi Hashimoto; (penalty scored) Shoma Nishimoto; (penalty scored) Kosei Kamiya; (penalty missed) Shuto Yamamoto

29 December 2022 Match 13	NSSU Kashiwa (Chiba Prefecture)	3–1	(Hyōgo Prefecture) Ashiya Gakuen	Kashiwa
12:05	Shusuke Furuya 12'; Ryo Hirano 22'; Manato Yoshida 51'	Report (JFA); Report (JFA)	Keisuke Noda 54'	Stadium: Kashiwanoha Stadium; Attendance: 4,160; Referee: Shuhei Ishimaru

29 December 2022 Match 14	Maebashi Ikuei (Gunma Prefecture)	2–1	(Miyazaki Prefecture) Nissho Gakuen	Saitama
12:05	Zen Takaashi 59'; Kosei Yamada 77'	Report (JFA); Report (JFA)	Shoma Ishizaki 50'	Stadium: NACK5 Stadium Omiya; Attendance: 3,204; Referee: Koki Yasukawa

29 December 2022 Match 15	Haguro (Yamagata Prefecture)	2–3	(Kagawa Prefecture) Kagawa Nishi	Saitama
14:10	Kengo Konishi 4'; Koki Inaba 65'	Report (JFA); Report (JFA)	Taichi Fukuhira 32'; Sora Kojima 35'; Shunsuke Ito 58'	Stadium: NACK5 Stadium Omiya; Attendance: 4,051; Referee: Taku Nagaya

29 December 2022 Match 16	Nihon Bunri (Niigata Prefecture)	2–1	(Shimane Prefecture) Rissho Shonan	Tokyo
12:05	Sei Sugimoto 1', 74'	Report (JFA); Report (JFA)	Ginjiro Kozai 57'	Stadium: Ajinomoto Field Nishigaoka; Attendance: 2,048; Referee: Toshiki Tomomasa

=== Second round ===
31 December 2022 Match 17	Aomori Yamada (Aomori Prefecture)	1–0	(Hiroshima Prefecture) Hiroshima Minami	Saitama
12:05	Haruki Mitsuhashi 46'	Report (JFA); Report (JFA)		Stadium: NHK Spring Mitsuzawa Football Stadium; Attendance: 6,314; Referee: Yusuke Ohashi

31 December 2022 Match 18	Shoshi (Fukushima Prefecture)	0–0 (3–4 p)	(Nagasaki Prefecture) Kunimi	Saitama
14:10		Report (JFA); Report (JFA)		Stadium: NHK Spring Mitsuzawa Football Stadium; Attendance: 7,607; Referee: Toshiki Tomomasa
	Penalties
	Rao Okano (penalty scored); Yuta Saso (penalty scored); Ren Shiraishi (penalty scored); Keita Jinguji (penalty missed); Sora Fujita (penalty missed)		(penalty scored) Yuri Toshine; (penalty scored) Ibuki Yuki; (penalty scored) Taiyo Hirata; (penalty scored) Kazuto Murata

31 December 2022 Match 19	Nihon Fujisawa (Kanagawa Prefecture)	2–1	(Tottori Prefecture) Yonago Kita	Kawasaki
14:10	Yuhi Nozawa 63'; Tessho Noda 70' (o.g.)	Report (JFA); Report (JFA)	Kazuki Morikawa 17'	Stadium: Kawasaki Todoroki Stadium; Attendance: 12,437; Referee: Koki Yasukawa

31 December 2022 Match 20	Yamanashi Gakuin (Yamanashi Prefecture)	2–3	(Kagoshima Prefecture) Kamimura Gakuen	Kawasaki
12:05	Manato Igarashi 4'; Takumi Miyaoka 67' (pen.)	Report (JFA); Report (JFA)	Jun Kasagi 36'; Shio Fukuda 38'; Minto Nishimaru 79'	Stadium: Kawasaki Todoroki Stadium; Attendance: 10,168; Referee: Kenji Wakamiya

31 December 2022 Match 21	Sano Nihon (Tochigi Prefecture)	1–0	(Nara Prefecture) Nara Ikuei	Tokyo
12:05	Shingo Nakano 80+2'	Report (JFA); Report (JFA)		Stadium: Ajinomoto Field Nishigaoka; Attendance: 2,606; Referee: Yuichi Hanakawa

31 December 2022 Match 22	Morioka Shogyo (Iwate Prefecture)	0–6	(Osaka Prefecture) Riseisha	Tokyo
14:10		Report (JFA); Report (JFA)	Towa Nishisaka 42', 48'; Kazunosuke Furuta 58'; Hyuga Kato 66'; Yuki Odamura 77'; Tomoki Mamiya 80+4' (o.g.)	Stadium: Ajinomoto Field Nishigaoka; Attendance: 3,159; Referee: Shinya Sasaki

31 December 2022 Match 23	Kashima Gakuen (Ibaraki Prefecture)	2–3	(Okayama Prefecture) Okayama Gakugeikan	Tokyo
12:05	Shumpei Senoo 38'; Keito Yamamoto 53'	Report (JFA); Report (JFA)	Aoi Yamada 18', 75'; Takuto Imai 39'	Stadium: Komazawa Olympic Park Stadium; Attendance: 4,065; Referee: Hiroki Murata

31 December 2022 Match 24	Kindai Wakayama (Wakayama Prefecture)	1–3	(Tokyo) Kokugakuin Kugayama	Tokyo
14:10	Yuhi Nagase 5'	Report (JFA); Report (JFA)	Kento Shiogai 42'; Sakukazu Takahashi 45', 80+1' (pen.)	Stadium: Komazawa Olympic Park Stadium; Attendance: 6,975; Referee: Kazuyoshi Karashima

31 December 2022 Match 25	Takagawa Gakuen (Yamaguchi Prefecture)	2–0	(Toyama Prefecture) Toyama Daiichi	Ichihara
12:05	Hiroto Sanemori 6'; Ginji Yamamoto 17' (pen.)	Report (JFA); Report (JFA)		Stadium: ZA Oripri Stadium; Attendance: 2,247; Referee: Genki Tawara

31 December 2022 Match 26	Higashiyama (Kyoto Prefecture)	4–0	(Miyagi Prefecture) Seiwa Gakuen	Ichihara
14:10	Renji Sanada 45'; Funosuke Shimizu 49'; Reiya Sakata 58'; Yuma Nakazato 80+3' (pen.)	Report (JFA); Report (JFA)		Stadium: ZA Oripri Stadium; Attendance: 3,585; Referee: Jin Hori

31 December 2022 Match 27	Maruoka (Fukui Prefecture)	0–2	(Chiba Prefecture) NSSU Kashiwa	Kashiwa
12:05		Report (JFA); Report (JFA)	Shusuke Furuya 22'; Hiraku Katano 77'	Stadium: Kashiwanoha Stadium; Attendance: 3,953; Referee: Yasuyuki Matsumoto

31 December 2022 Match 28	NAU Meioh (Akita Prefecture)	0–1	(Fukuoka Prefecture) Iizuka	Kashiwa
14:10		Report (JFA); Report (JFA)	Shosei Hara 40'	Stadium: Kashiwanoha Stadium; Attendance: 4,158; Referee: Ryuhei Yamaguchi

31 December 2022 Match 29	Shohei (Saitama Prefecture)	3–1	(Shiga Prefecture) Ohmi	Saitama
12:05	Tsubasa Shinoda 55', 80+4'; Fuga Ito 74'	Report (JFA); Report (JFA)	Eiji Uto 61'	Stadium: NACK5 Stadium Omiya; Attendance: 5,978; Referee: Kentaro Uematsu

31 December 2022 Match 30	Maebashi Ikuei (Gunma Prefecture)	6–1	(Kagawa Prefecture) Kagawa Nishi	Saitama
14:10	Zen Takaashi 24'; Sota Yamamoto 47', 68'; Naoya Koike 56', 74'; Naoto Horikawa 77'	Report (JFA); Report (JFA)	Koichi Yamada 58' (pen.)	Stadium: NACK5 Stadium Omiya; Attendance: 6,872; Referee: Hiroki Tani

31 December 2022 Match 31	Seiritsu Gakuen (Tokyo)	0–1	(Niigata Prefecture) Nihon Bunri	Saitama
12:05		Report (JFA); Report (JFA)	Daiki Sone 80+2'	Stadium: Urawa Komaba Stadium; Attendance: 3,157; Referee: Takamasa Funahashi

31 December 2022 Match 32	Hamamatsu Kaiseikan (Shizuoka Prefecture)	1–1 (3–4 p)	(Kumamoto Prefecture) Ohzu	Saitama
14:10	Akira Sakaue 40'	Report (JFA); Report (JFA)	Sota Chuman 80+4'	Stadium: Urawa Komaba Stadium; Attendance: 5,802; Referee: Shuhei Ishimaru
	Penalties
	Ayumu Harada (penalty scored); Jun Higo (penalty scored); Riku Yamaguchi (penalty scored); Sota Kaneko (penalty missed); Akira Sakaue (penalty missed)		(penalty missed) Shunei Kobayashi; (penalty scored) Hiroto Iwasaki; (penalty scored) Asuma Ikari; (penalty scored) Sota Chuman; (penalty scored) Rikia Asano

=== Third round ===
2 January 2023 Match 33	Aomori Yamada (Aomori Prefecture)	1–1 (4–2 p)	(Nagasaki Prefecture) Kunimi	Kawasaki
14:10	Haruki Mitsuhashi 40+3'	Report (JFA); Report (JFA)	Yuri Toshine 67'	Stadium: Kawasaki Todoroki Stadium; Attendance: 12,304; Referee: Kentaro Uematsu
	Penalties
	Kazuma Kitamura (penalty scored); Ryunosuke Imabayashi (penalty scored); Hinata Ueda (penalty scored); Taiyo Hirata (penalty scored)		(penalty scored) Yuri Toshine; (penalty missed) Haruki Mitsuhashi; (penalty scored) Kotaro Nishiwaki; (penalty missed) Rai Watanabe

2 January 2023 Match 34	Nihon Fujisawa (Kanagawa Prefecture)	1–1 (3–5 p)	(Kagoshima Prefecture) Kamimura Gakuen	Kawasaki
12:05	Yosuke Morishige 51'	Report (JFA); Report (JFA)	Kakeru Okawa 55'	Stadium: Kawasaki Todoroki Stadium; Attendance: 10,476; Referee: Ryuhei Yamaguchi
	Penalties
	Yuhi Nozawa (penalty missed); Tatsuya Miyazaki (penalty scored); Shuma Munetsugu (penalty scored); Yosuke Morishige (penalty scored)		(penalty scored) Rui Osako; (penalty scored) Minto Nishimaru; (penalty scored) Shio Fukuda; (penalty scored) Kojiro Nakae; (penalty scored) Gaku Nawata

2 January 2023 Match 35	Sano Nihon (Tochigi Prefecture)	1–1 (5–4 p)	(Osaka Prefecture) Riseisha	Tokyo
12:05	Masaki Aoki 42'	Report (JFA); Report (JFA)	Toya Myogan 60'	Stadium: Komazawa Olympic Park Stadium; Attendance: 4,485; Referee: Yasuhiro Udagawa
	Penalties
	Shunki Mukai (penalty scored); Masaki Aoki (penalty scored); Shoma Kotake (penalty scored); Francis Rui Hiagon (penalty scored); Haruki Momiyama (penalty scored)		(penalty scored) Kazunosuke Furuta; (penalty scored) Towa Nishisaka; (penalty missed) Yuki Odamura; (penalty scored) Hinata Kato; (penalty scored) Toya Myogan

2 January 2023 Match 36	Okayama Gakugeikan (Okayama Prefecture)	0–0 (5–3 p)	(Tokyo) Kokugakuin Kugayama	Tokyo
14:10		Report (JFA); Report (JFA)		Stadium: Komazawa Olympic Park Stadium; Attendance: 6,536; Referee: Takamasa Funahashi
	Penalties
	Haruto Okamoto (penalty scored); Kyogo Kimura (penalty scored); Aoi Yamada (penalty scored); Tsukasa Inoue (penalty scored); Takuto Imai (penalty scored)		(penalty missed) Kento Shiogai; (penalty scored) Sakukazu Takahashi; (penalty scored) Towa Okai; (penalty scored) Oto Nakayama

2 January 2023 Match 37	Takagawa Gakuen (Yamaguchi Prefecture)	0–2	(Kyoto Prefecture) Higashiyama	Kashiwa
14:10		Report (JFA); Report (JFA)	Aren Ishii 1'; Renji Sanada 51'	Stadium: Kashiwanoha Stadium; Attendance: 4,002; Referee: Yusuke Ohashi

2 January 2023 Match 38	NSSU Kashiwa (Chiba Prefecture)	1–0	(Fukuoka Prefecture) Iizuka	Kashiwa
12:05	William Owie 20'	Report (JFA); Report (JFA)		Stadium: Kashiwanoha Stadium; Attendance: 4,316; Referee: Yuki Tanabe

2 January 2023 Match 39	Shohei (Saitama Prefecture)	1–2	(Gunma Prefecture) Maebashi Ikuei	Saitama
12:05	Yuta Arai 3'	Report (JFA); Report (JFA)	Sota Yamamoto 13'; Ryujiro Aoyanagi 50'	Stadium: Urawa Komaba Stadium; Attendance: 15,372; Referee: Kohei Yano

2 January 2023 Match 40	Nihon Bunri (Niigata Prefecture)	0–3	(Kumamoto Prefecture) Ohzu	Saitama
14:10		Report (JFA); Report (JFA)	Rikia Asano 30'; Shunei Kobayashi 62'; Hiroto Iwasaki 80+3' (pen.)	Stadium: Urawa Komaba Stadium; Attendance: 16,042; Referee: Takao Nishiyama

=== Quarter-finals ===
4 January 2023 Match 41	Aomori Yamada (Aomori Prefecture)	1–2	(Kagoshima Prefecture) Kamimura Gakuen	Kawasaki
14:10	Ryunosuke Nakayama 34'	Report (JFA); Report (JFA)	Minto Nishimaru 54'; Shio Fukuda 60'	Stadium: Kawasaki Todoroki Stadium; Attendance: 11,336; Referee: Genki Tawara

4 January 2023 Match 42	Sano Nihon (Tochigi Prefecture)	0–4	(Okayama Prefecture) Okayama Gakugeikan	Kawasaki
12:05		Report (JFA); Report (JFA)	Yuma Taguchi 12'; Takuto Imai 53'; Ruki Kinoshita 72'; Nozomi Tanabe 80+3' (pen.)	Stadium: Kawasaki Todoroki Stadium; Attendance: 7,948; Referee: Kohei Yano

4 January 2023 Match 43	Higashiyama (Kyoto Prefecture)	0–0 (4–3 p)	(Chiba Prefecture) NSSU Kashiwa	Saitama
14:10		Report (JFA); Report (JFA)		Stadium: Urawa Komaba Stadium; Attendance: 6,402; Referee: Takao Nishiyama
	Penalties
	Rikuto Shintani (penalty scored); Reiya Sakata (penalty scored); Yuma Nakazato (penalty missed); Keita Matsuhashi (penalty scored); Renji Sanada (penalty scored)		(penalty missed) Hiraku Katano; (penalty scored) Yuta Koganeya; (penalty scored) Shogo Ueki; (penalty scored) Hiroto Aihara; (penalty missed) William Owie

4 January 2023 Match 44	Maebashi Ikuei (Gunma Prefecture)	0–0 (4–5 p)	(Kumamoto Prefecture) Ohzu	Saitama
12:05		Report (JFA); Report (JFA)		Stadium: Urawa Komaba Stadium; Attendance: 5,774; Referee: Shingo Kuniyoshi
	Penalties
	Ryo Tokunaga (penalty scored); Kyosuke Yamauchi (penalty missed); Hayama Inoue (penalty scored); Ryujiro Aoyanagi (penalty scored); Genki Nezu (penalty scored)		(penalty scored) Shunei Kobayashi; (penalty scored) Hiroto Iwasaki; (penalty scored) Asuma Ikari; (penalty scored) Sota Chuman; (penalty scored) Tsubasa Inada

=== Semi-finals ===
7 January 2023 Match 45	Kamimura Gakuen (Kagoshima Prefecture)	3–3 (1–4 p)	(Okayama Prefecture) Okayama Gakugeikan	Tokyo
12:05	Shio Fukuda 38'; Rui Osako 59'; Kojiro Nakae 69'	Report (JFA); Report (JFA)	Yuma Taguchi 6'; Takuto Imai 62'; Haruto Okamoto 73'	Stadium: Japan National Stadium; Attendance: 19,472; Referee: Tatsuya Sakai
	Penalties
	Rui Osako (penalty scored); Minto Nishimaru (penalty missed); Shio Fukuda (penalty missed)		(penalty scored) Haruto Okamoto; (penalty scored) Kyogo Kimura; (penalty scored) Aoi Yamada; (penalty scored) Tsubasa Inou

7 January 2023 Match 46	Higashiyama (Kyoto Prefecture)	1–1 (4–2 p)	(Kumamoto Prefecture) Ohzu	Tokyo
14:10	Keita Matsuhashi 63'	Report (JFA); Report (JFA)	Kotaro Ii 39'	Stadium: Japan National Stadium; Attendance: 21,875; Referee: Yoshikazu Matsuzawa
	Penalties
	Rikuto Shintani (penalty scored); Reiya Sakata (penalty scored); Aren Ishii (penalty scored); Keita Matsuhashi (penalty scored)		(penalty scored) Shunei Kobayashi; (penalty missed) Hiroto Iwasaki; (penalty scored) Asuma Ikari; (penalty missed) Sota Chuman

=== Final ===
9 January 2023
14:05
Match 47

Okayama Gakugeikan (Okayama Prefecture)	3–1	(Kyoto Prefecture) Higashiyama
Rikuto Shintani 24' (o.g.); Kyogo Kimura 49', 85'	Report (JFA); Report (JFA)	Renji Sanada 44'

Japan National Stadium, Tokyo
Attendance: 50,868
Referee: Koei Koya

Okayama Gakugeikan	Higashiyama

GK	12	(Japan) Jin Hiratsuka
DF	2	(Japan) Shin Fukui
DF	3	(Japan) Daishin Taguchi
DF	4	(Japan) Tsukasa Inoue (c)
DF	5	(Japan) Takashi Nakao
MF	6	(Japan) Yuma Taguchi	(substituted off) 61'
MF	7	(Japan) Kyogo Kimura
MF	8	(Japan) Haruto Okamoto
MF	10	(Japan) Aoi Yamada
FW	9	(Japan) Takuto Imai
FW	11	(Japan) Nozomi Tanabe	(substituted off) 88'
Substitutes:
GK	1	(Japan) Akira Yano
DF	13	(Japan) Daiki Hirano
DF	16	(Japan) Tsuyoshi Fujita
MF	14	(Japan) Hinata Tamura	(substituted on) 88'
MF	15	(Japan) Hayuma Takayama
MF	17	(Japan) Kosei Nishikawa
MF	19	(Japan) Ruki Kinoshita	(substituted on) 61'
FW	18	(Japan) Kanato Kimura
FW	20	(Japan) Sora Sakaguchi
Manager:
(Japan) Yoshiaki Takahara

GK	1	(Japan) Mizuki Sato
DF	2	(Japan) Aren Ishii	(substituted off) 85'
DF	3	(Japan) Seigo Shizu
DF	4	(Japan) Rikuto Shintani (c)
DF	6	(Japan) Yuma Nakazato
MF	7	(Japan) Renji Sanada
MF	8	(Japan) Keita Matsuhashi
MF	10	(Japan) Reiya Sakata	(substituted off) 82'
MF	13	(Japan) Funosuke Shimizu	(substituted off) 71'
FW	14	(Japan) Keijiro Kitamura
FW	15	(Japan) Reo Toyoshima	(substituted off) 82'
Substitutes:
GK	17	(Japan) Shunya Maki
DF	19	(Japan) Takuto Hosaka	(substituted on) 85'
DF	20	(Japan) Kohei Suzuki
MF	9	(Japan) Ayato Otani	(substituted on) 71'
MF	11	(Japan) Koki Ueda
MF	12	(Japan) Kazuya Kikuyama
MF	18	(Japan) Rai Hamase
FW	16	(Japan) Shoma Nakano	(substituted on) 82'
FW	30	(Japan) Kazuma Hirao	(substituted on) 82'
Manager:
(Japan) Ryoichi Fukushige

Assistant referees:
Hiroshi Morikawa
Tomoyuki Umeda
Fourth official:
Yuki Tanabe

Match rules

- 90 minutes.
- Extra-time if scores still level at the end of regulation time.
- Penalty shoot-out if scores still level at the end of extra time.
- Nine named substitutes.
- Maximum of five substitutions during regulation time, with one more substition allowed if the match needs to go into extra-time.

== Top scorers ==
Rank	Player	High School	Goals
1	(Japan) Shio Fukuda	Kamimura Gakuen	3
1	(Japan) Takuto Imai	Okayama Gakugeikan	3
1	(Japan) Yosuke Morishige	Nihon Fujisawa	3
1	(Japan) Renji Sanada	Higashiyama	3
1	(Japan) Sota Yamamoto	Maebashi Ikuei	3

== Selected best players ==
The following 36 players featured in the Tournament's Best Players Squad:

Pos.	Player	High School	Grade	Moved to
GK	Soma Amano	Maebashi Ikuei	2nd	Maebashi Ikuei
GK	Jin Hiratsuka	Okayama Gakugeikan	2nd	Okayama Gakugeikan
GK	Mizuki Sato	Higashiyama	3rd	Doshisha University
DF	Asuma Ikari	Ohzu	2nd	Ohzu
DF	Tsukasa Inoue	Okayama Gakugeikan	3rd	Nippon Sport Science University
DF	Shun Saito	Maebashi Ikuei	3rd	Momoyama Gakuin University
DF	Rikuto Shintani	Higashiyama	3rd	Meiji University
DF	Seigo Shizu	Higashiyama	2nd	Higashiyama
DF	Hiroto Suzuki	Shoshi	3rd	Sendai University
DF	Yoshiki Takushima	Aomori Yamada	3rd	Meiji University
DF	Yoshihisa Tanabe	Ohzu	2nd	Ohzu
DF	Keisuke Tsukui	Shohei	3rd	Kashima Antlers
DF	Yumeki Yoshinaga	Kamimura Gakuen	2nd	Kamimura Gakuen
MF	Hiroto Aihara	NSSU Kashiwa	3rd	Niigata University HW
MF	Jun Kasagi	Kamimura Gakuen	3rd	NIFS Kanoya
MF	Kyogo Kimura	Okayama Gakugeikan	3rd	Komazawa University
MF	Keita Matsuhashi	Higashiyama	3rd	Tokai University
MF	Toya Myogan	Riseisha	3rd	Kawasaki Frontale

Pos.	Player	High School	Grade	Moved to
MF	Haruto Okamoto	Okayama Gakugeikan	3rd	Chuo University
MF	Rui Osako	Kamimura Gakuen	3rd	Cerezo Osaka
MF	Reiya Sakata	Higashiyama	3rd	Cerezo Osaka
MF	Renji Sanada	Higashiyama	3rd	Kansai University
MF	Tsubasa Shinoda	Shohei	3rd	University of Tsukuba
MF	Rui Tabaru	Ohzu	3rd	Rissho University
MF	Ryo Tokunaga	Maebashi Ikuei	3rd	University of Tsukuba
MF	Aoi Yamada	Okayama Gakugeikan	3rd	Fukuoka University
FW	Shio Fukuda	Kamimura Gakuen	3rd	(Germany) Borussia Mönchengladbach II
FW	Kazunosuke Furuta	Riseisha	3rd	Kwansei Gakuin University
FW	Takuto Imai	Okayama Gakugeikan	3rd	Komazawa University
FW	Shunei Kobayashi	Ohzu	3rd	University of Tsukuba
FW	Tsuna Kominato	Aomori Yamada	3rd	Hosei University
FW	Yosuke Morishige	Nihon Fujisawa	3rd	Shimizu S-Pulse
FW	Oto Nakayama	Kokugakuin Kugayama	3rd	Doshisha University
FW	Minto Nishimaru	Kamimura Gakuen	2nd	Kamimura Gakuen
FW	Kento Shiogai	Kokugakuin Kugayama	3rd	Keio University
FW	Manato Yoshida	NSSU Kashiwa	3rd	Tokyo International University

== Joining J.League clubs on 2023 ==
Pos.	Player	Moving from	Moving to	League
DF	Towa Nishisaka	Riseisha	Tokushima Vortis	J2
DF	Keisuke Tsukui	Shohei	Kashima Antlers	J1
MF	Yuta Arai	Shohei	FC Tokyo	J1
MF	Raiya Kinkawa	Nissho Gakuen	Tegevajaro Miyazaki	J3
MF	Toya Myogan	Riseisha	Kawasaki Frontale	J1
MF	Rui Osako	Kamimura Gakuen	Cerezo Osaka	J1
MF	Reiya Sakata	Higashiyama	Cerezo Osaka	J1
FW	Yosuke Morishige	Nihon Fujisawa	Shimizu S-Pulse	J2
FW	William Owie	NSSU Kashiwa	Kashiwa Reysol	J1
