= Masaya (given name) =

Masaya is a masculine Japanese given name. Notable people with the name include:

- Masaya Ando (安藤 正哉; born 1960), Japanese sport wrestler
- Masaya Chikamoto (近本 昌也; born 1991), Japanese professional Super Smash Bros. Melee player
- Masaya Fukunishi (福西 勝也; born 1995), Japanese voice actor
- Masaya Hashimoto (橋本 雅也), Japanese video game developer
- Masaya Kato (加藤 雅也; born 1963), Japanese actor
- Masaya Kikawada (黄川田 将也; born 1980), Japanese actor
- Masaya Kimura (木村 正哉; born 1986), Japanese cross-country skier
- Masaya Kimura (木村 柾哉; born 1997), Japanese singer, dancer and actor. Member of the Japanese boy group INI.
- Masaya Matsukaze (松風 雅也; born 1976), Japanese actor, voice actor and radio personality
- Masaya Matsumoto (松本 昌也; born 1995), Japanese footballer
- Masaya Matsuura (松浦 雅也; born 1960), Japanese musician and video game designer
- Masaya Morita (森田 真沙也; born 2003), Japanese ice skater
- Masaya Nakamura (disambiguation), several people
- Masaya Onosaka (小野坂 昌也; born 1964), Japanese voice actor
- Masaya Oya (大箭 将也; born 1992), stylized as Camellia, Japanese musician
- Masaya Ozaki (尾崎 匡哉; born 1984), Japanese baseball player
- Masaya Saito (斎藤 雅也; born 1985), Japanese footballer
- Masaya Tomizawa (富澤 雅也; born 1993), Japanese footballer
- Masaya Yamamoto (山本 真也; born 1991), Japanese footballer

== Fictional Characters ==
- Masaya Aoyama (青山 雅也), a character from Tokyo Mew Mew
