= Sere Matsumura =

Japanese footballer

Sere Matsumura 松村 晟怜
Personal information
- Full name: Sere Matsumura
- Date of birth: 8 December 2003 (age 22)
- Place of birth: Niigata, Japan
- Height: 1.84 m (6 ft 0 in)
- Position: Centre back

Team information
- Current team: Shonan Bellmare
- Number: 32

Youth career
- FC Yamato
- 2016–2018: Nagaoka JYFC
- 2019–2021: Teikyo Nagaoka High School

Senior career*
Years	Team	Apps	(Gls)
2022–	Shonan Bellmare	28	(0)
- * Club domestic league appearances and goals as of 14 August 2026

Sere Matsumura (松村 晟怜, Matsumura Sere; born 8 December 2003) is a Japanese footballer currently playing as a centre back for Shonan Bellmare.

== Early life ==
Sere was born in Niigata.

== Club career ==
In mid-2021, it was announced that Matsumura would join J1 League side Shonan Bellmare ahead of the 2022 season. He is seen as a young player with the potential to represent Japan at international level.

Sere made his debut for Shonan against Sanfrecce Hiroshima on the 2nd of April 2022, coming on for Shota Kobayashi.

== Career statistics ==
=== Club ===
As of 2 April 2022.

Club	Season	League			National Cup		League Cup		Other		Total	
Club	Season	Division	Apps	Goals	Apps	Goals	Apps	Goals	Apps	Goals	Apps	Goals
Shonan Bellmare	2022	J1 League	1	0	0	0	1 (Note: Appearances in the J.League Cup)	0	0	0	2	0
Career total			1	0	0	0	1	0	0	0	2	0
