= Masaya Nakamura =

Masaya Nakamura may refer to:

- Masaya Nakamura (actor) (中村 昌也, born 1986), Japanese actor
- Masaya Nakamura (businessman) (中村 雅哉, 1925–2017), Japanese businessman
- Masaya Nakamura (photographer) (中村 正也, 1926–2001), Japanese photographer
