= Danish Music Museum =

Museum in Copenhagen, Denmark

Coordinates: 55.6823°N 12.5523°E

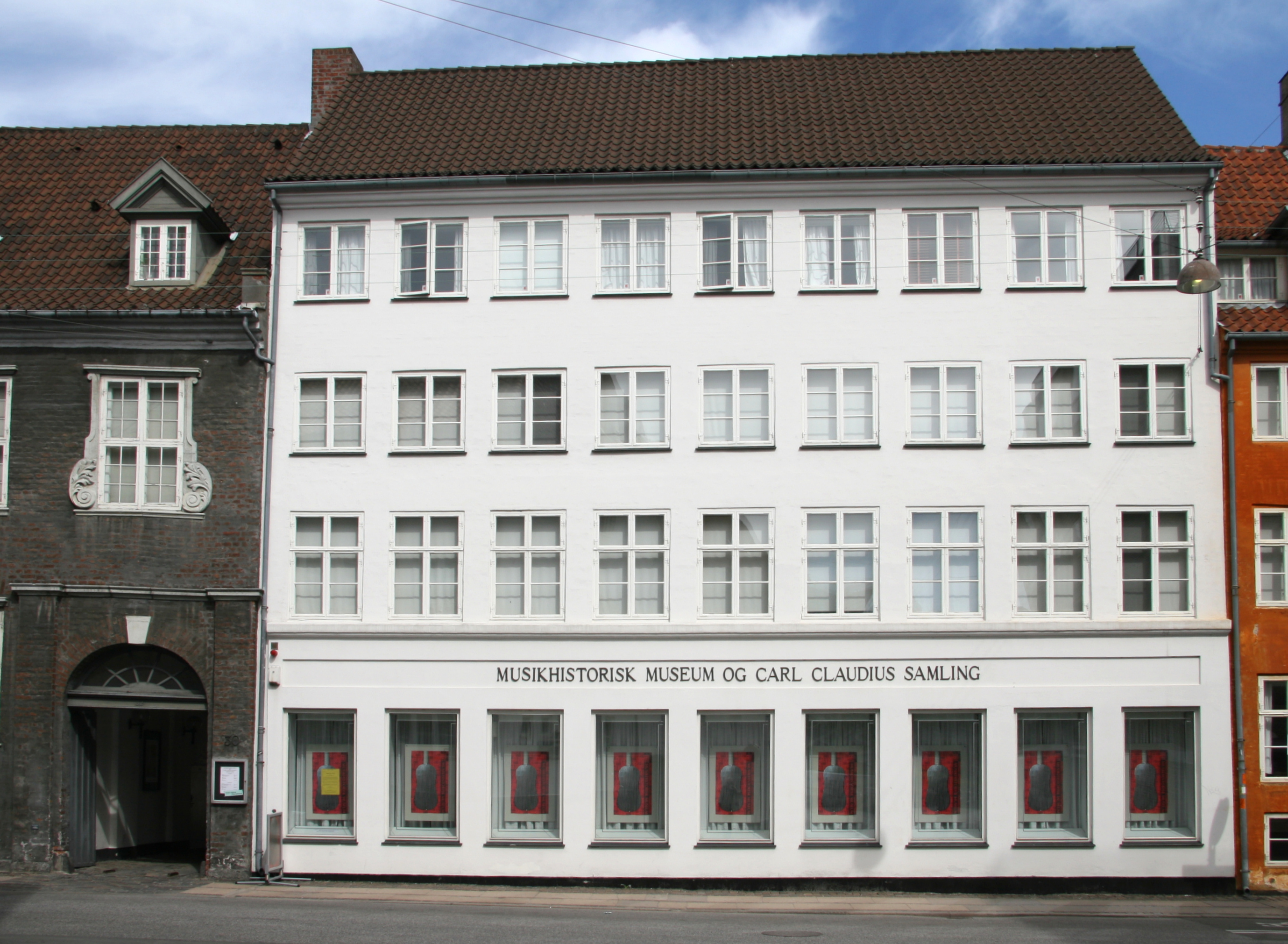
Danish Music Museum

The Danish Music Museum (Danish: Musikmuseet; formerly Musikhistorsik Museum and Carl Claudius Samling) is located in Rosenørns Alle 22 in Copenhagen, Denmark. The building is shared with the Royal Danish Academy of Music (Det Kongelige Danske Musikkonservatorium).

The Danish Music Museum was founded in 1898 and owns a collection of musical instruments from all over the world. The oldest museum pieces are from the 16th century. The library is focused on Danish musical life and contains works by composers such as Niels Gade, as well as material on musicians such as Aksel Schiøtz.

The museum is part of the National Museum of Denmark.

== See also ==
- List of music museums
