= Yuta Imazu =

Japanese footballer

Yuta Imazu 今津 佑太
Personal information
- Date of birth: 8 July 1995 (age 31)
- Place of birth: Minami-Alps, Yamanashi, Japan
- Height: 1.84 m (6 ft 1/2 in)
- Position: Centre back

Team information
- Current team: Sagan Tosu
- Number: 4

Youth career
- 2011–2013: RKU Kashiwa High School

College career
Years	Team	Apps	(Gls)
2014–2017	Ryutsu Keizai University		

Senior career*
Years	Team	Apps	(Gls)
2018–2020	Ventforet Kofu	65	(3)
2021–2022	Sanfrecce Hiroshima	20	(0)
2023	V-Varen Nagasaki	20	(0)
2024	Ventforet Kofu	23	(0)
2024–	Sagan Tosu	35	(2)
- * Club domestic league appearances and goals as of 14 August 2026

Yuta Imazu (今津 佑太, Imazu Yuta; born 8 July 1995) is a Japanese professional footballer who plays as a centre back for J2 League club Sagan Tosu.

Primarily known for his time in the J2 League, Imazu has played over 130 league matches.

== Career ==
Born in Minami-Alps, Yamanashi, Imazu studied at RKU Kashiwa High School, where he won the 2013 Takamadonomiya Trophy U-18 League Championship. He went to Ryutsu Keizai University, where he won the 2014 Prime Minister's Cup, and the 2014 and 2017 editions of the All-Japan University Championship. At the end of his third year of university, he injured his right knee meniscus and underwent surgery. This resulted in no Japanese club offering a contract until he joined Ventforet Kofu as a trainee in January 2018. He was highly praised by the club during the training sessions. On 3 June 2018, he scored his first professional goal in the J.League Cup against Urawa Red Diamonds, scoring a header in the 37th minute.

On 28 December 2020, Imazu was announced at Sanfrecce Hiroshima on a permanent transfer. During the 2021 season, he made 15 league appearances for the club.

On 28 December 2022, Imazu was announced at V-Varen Nagasaki on a permanent transfer. During the 2023 season, he made 20 league appearances for the club.

On 12 January 2024, Imazu was announced at Ventforet Kofu on a permanent transfer. During the 2024 season, he made 23 league appearances for the club.

On 21 August 2024, Imazu was announced at Sagan Tosu on a permanent transfer.

== Style of play ==
Imazu is described as strong in aerial battles.

== Club statistics ==
As of the start of 2023 season.

Appearances and goals by club, season and competition
Club	Season	League			National cup		League cup		Total	
Club	Season	Division	Apps	Goals	Apps	Goals	Apps	Goals	Apps	Goals
Japan			League		Emperor's Cup		J. League Cup		Total	
Ventforet Kofu	2018	J2 League	24	1	1	0	7	1	32	2
Ventforet Kofu	2019	J2 League	5	0	4	0	–		9	0
Ventforet Kofu	2020	J2 League	36	2	0	0	–		36	2
Ventforet Kofu	Total		65	3	5	0	7	1	77	4
Sanfrecce Hiroshima	2021	J1 League	15	0	1	0	5	0	21	0
Sanfrecce Hiroshima	2022	J1 League	5	0	1	0	3	0	9	0
Sanfrecce Hiroshima	Total		20	0	2	0	8	0	30	0
V-Varen Nagasaki	2023	J2 League	0	0	0	0	0	0	0	0
V-Varen Nagasaki	Total		0	0	0	0	0	0	0	0
Career total			85	3	7	0	15	1	107	4
