= Kota Muramatsu =

Japanese footballer

Kota Muramatsu 村松 航太
Personal information
- Full name: Kota Muramatsu
- Date of birth: 22 August 1997 (age 29)
- Place of birth: Fujieda, Shizuoka, Japan
- Height: 1.71 m (5 ft 7 in)
- Position: Midfielder

Team information
- Current team: Kagoshima United
- Number: 16

Youth career
- –2009: Aojima Kita SSS
- 2010–2012: Fujieda Higashi FC
- 2013–2015: Shimizu S-Pulse

College career
Years	Team	Apps	(Gls)
2016–2019	Juntendo University		

Senior career*
Years	Team	Apps	(Gls)
2020–2021	Giravanz Kitakyushu	74	(0)
2022–2023	V-Varen Nagasaki	26	(0)
2023	→ Giravanz Kitakyushu (loan)	38	(1)
2024–2025	Blaublitz Akita	68	(2)
2026–	Kagoshima United	15	(0)
- * Club domestic league appearances and goals as of 18 August 2026

Kota Muramatsu (村松 航太, Muramatsu Kota; born 22 August 1997) is a Japanese footballer currently playing as a midfielder for J3 League club Kagoshima United.

== Career statistics ==
=== Club ===
As of 14 May 2026.

Appearances and goals by club, season and competition
Club	Season	League			National cup (Note: Includes Emperor Cup)		League cup (Note: Includes J.League Cup)		Total	
Club	Season	Division	Apps	Goals	Apps	Goals	Apps	Goals	Apps	Goals
Giravanz Kitakyushu	2020	J2 League	40	0	0	0	–		40	0
Giravanz Kitakyushu	2021	J2 League	34	0	1	0	–		35	0
Giravanz Kitakyushu	Total		74	0	1	0	0	0	75	0
V-Varen Nagasaki	2022	J2 League	26	0	2	0	–		28	0
Giravanz Kitakyushu (loan)	2023	J3 League	38	1	0	0	–		38	1
Blaublitz Akita	2024	J2 League	32	0	0	0	1	0	33	0
Blaublitz Akita	2025	J2 League	36	2	3	0	1	0	40	2
Blaublitz Akita	Total		68	2	3	0	2	0	73	2
Kagoshima United	2026	J2/J3 (100)	11	0	–		–		11	0
Career total			217	3	6	0	2	0	225	3
