= Yosuke Morishige =

Japanese footballer (born 2004)

Yosuke Morishige 森重陽介
Personal information
- Date of birth: 5 April 2004 (age 22)
- Place of birth: Fujisawa, Kanagawa, Japan
- Height: 1.98 m (6 ft 6 in)
- Position: Forward

Team information
- Current team: Nõmme United
- Number: 2

Youth career
- –2016: JFC Futuro
- 2017–2019: Tokyo Verdy
- 2020–2022: Nihon University Fujisawa High School

Senior career*
Years	Team	Apps	(Gls)
2023–2024	Shimizu S-Pulse	6	(0)
2024–2025	Cianorte	6	(1)
2025	→ Monte Azul (loan)	4	(0)
2026–	Nõmme United	15	(2)
- * Club domestic league appearances and goals as of 24 July 2026

Yosuke Morishige (in Japanese: 森重陽介, Morishige Yosuke, born 5 April 2004) is a Japanese professional footballer who plays as forward for Estonian Meistriliiga club Nõmme United.

== Career ==
Highlight of Nihon University Fujisawa High School in 2022 All Japan High School Soccer Tournament, Morishige joined Shimizu S-Pulse in February 2023 and remained with the club until October 2024, when he was dismissed after an act of indiscipline. In November, he was signed by Brazilian club Cianorte, where he played in the 2025 Campeonato Paranaense. In April, he was loaned to Monte Azul to compete in 2025 Campeonato Brasileiro Série D.

== Style of play ==
Due to his height, Morishige stands out for his aerial ability and strong finishing. In Brazil, he was nicknamed "Japanese Haaland."

== Honours ==
Shimizu S-Pulse

- J2 League: 2024
