= Rio Hyon =

Japanese footballer

Personal information
- Date of birth: 30 December 2003 (age 22)
- Place of birth: Hyōgo, Japan
- Height: 1.71 m (5 ft 7 in)
- Position: Midfielder

Team information
- Current team: Sagan Tosu
- Number: 18

Youth career
- Nishinomiya SS
- FC Libre
- 2019–2021: Shizuoka Gakuen High School

Senior career*
Years	Team	Apps	(Gls)
2022–2025	Tokushima Vortis	60	(0)
2024	← Tochigi SC (loan)	11	(0)
2026–	Sagan Tosu	18	(2)
- * Club domestic league appearances and goals as of 14 August 2026

Rio Hyon (玄 理吾, Hyon Rio; born 30 December 2003) is a Japanese footballer who plays as a midfielder for Sagan Tosu.

== Early life ==
Hyon played for Nishinomiya SS, FC Libre and Shizuoka Gakuen High School in his youth, before signing for Tokushima Vortis.

== Career ==
Hyon made his league debut for Tokushima against Mito HollyHock on the 17 April 2022. He was naturalized as a Japanese citizen in 2023.

During the 2024 J2 League season, Hyon moved to Tochigi SC on loan.

== Career statistics ==
=== Club ===
As of 23 February 2022.

Club	Season	League			National Cup		League Cup		Other		Total	
Club	Season	Division	Apps	Goals	Apps	Goals	Apps	Goals	Apps	Goals	Apps	Goals
Tokushima Vortis	2022	J2 League	0	0	0	0	1 (Note: Appearances in the J.League Cup)	0	0	0	1	0
Career total			0	0	0	0	1	0	0	0	1	0
