= Tsubasa Kasayanagi =

Japanese footballer

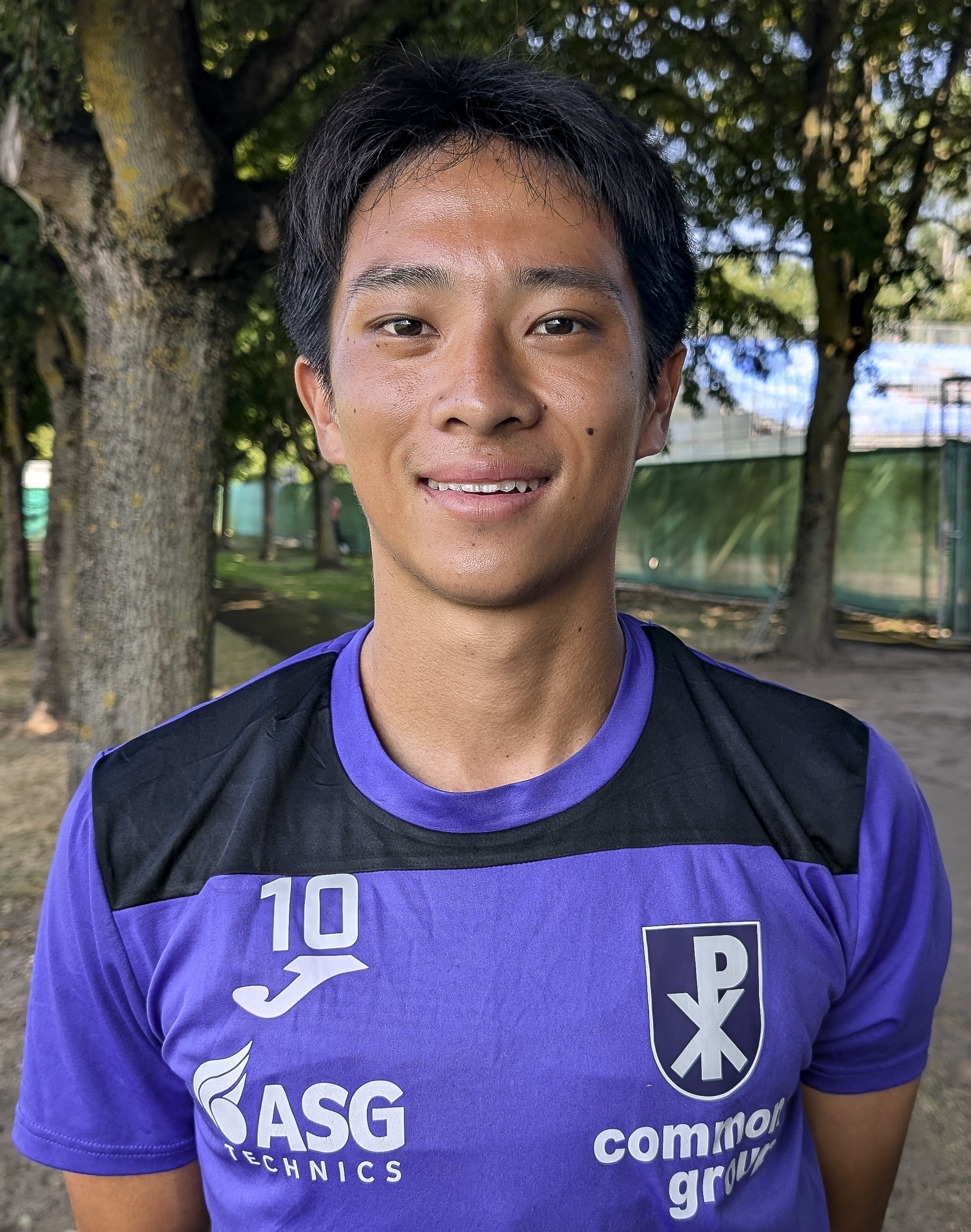

Personal information
- Date of birth: 24 June 2003 (age 23)
- Place of birth: Kanagawa, Japan
- Height: 1.75 m (5 ft 9 in)
- Position: Midfielder

Team information
- Current team: Patro Eisden (on loan from V-Varen Nagasaki)
- Number: 10

Youth career
- FC Nakahara
- Yokohama FC
- FC Kawasaki Champ
- 2019–2021: Maebashi Ikuei High School

Senior career*
Years	Team	Apps	(Gls)
2022–	V-Varen Nagasaki	94	(8)
2026–	→ Patro Eisden (loan)	6	(1)

International career^{‡}
2021	Japan U18		
2022	Japan U20		
- * Club domestic league appearances and goals as of 20 September 2026 ‡ National team caps and goals as of 17:04, 21 April 2022 (UTC)

Tsubasa Kasayanagi (笠柳 翼, Kasayanagi Tsubasa; born 24 June 2003) is a Japanese footballer who plays as a midfielder for Challenger Pro League club Patro Eisden in Belgium on loan from V-Varen Nagasaki.

== Early life ==
Tsubasa was born in Kanagawa. He played for Yokohama, FC Kawasaki CHAMP and Maebashi Ikuei HS during his youth.

== Club career ==
After studying at the Maebashi Ikuei High School, Kasayanagi joined V-Varen Nagasaki ahead of the 2022 season.

He made his debut for V-Varen in a 1–0 loss against Zweigen Kanazawa, coming on in the 80th minute for Takashi Sawada. He scored his first goal for the club against Blaublitz Akita, scoring in the 2nd minute.

== International career ==
Tsubasa has international caps at youth level for Japan.

== Career statistics ==
=== Club ===
As of 21 April 2022.

Club	Season	League			National Cup		League Cup		Other		Total	
Club	Season	Division	Apps	Goals	Apps	Goals	Apps	Goals	Apps	Goals	Apps	Goals
V-Varen Nagasaki	2022	J2 League	1	0	0	0	0	0	0	0	1	0
Career total			1	0	0	0	0	0	0	0	1	0
