= Takashi Sawada =

Japanese footballer

Takashi Sawada 澤田崇
Personal information
- Full name: Takashi Sawada
- Date of birth: 26 May 1991 (age 35)
- Place of birth: Kikuyō, Japan
- Height: 1.70 m (5 ft 7 in)
- Position: Forward

Team information
- Current team: V-Varen Nagasaki
- Number: 19

Youth career
- –2002: Kumamoto Aqua
- 2003–2005: Kikuyo Junior High School
- 2006–2008: Ohzu High School

College career
Years	Team	Apps	(Gls)
2009–2013	Chuo University		

Senior career*
Years	Team	Apps	(Gls)
2014	Roasso Kumamoto	40	(9)
2015–2016	Shimizu S-Pulse	14	(1)
2017–	V-Varen Nagasaki	293	(25)
- * Club domestic league appearances and goals as of 11 August 2026

Takashi Sawada (澤田崇, Sawada Takashi; born 26 May 1991 in Kikuyō, Kumamoto) is a Japanese footballer who plays for V-Varen Nagasaki.

== Early life ==
Takashi was born in Kikuyō. He studied at Chuo University.

== Career ==
Takashi scored his first goal for Shimizu in the J.League Cup on the 22nd April 2015, scoring in the 77th minute. His first league goal for Shimizu was scored on the 7th of November 2015, scoring in the 14th minute.

== Career statistics ==
Updated to 1 March 2019.

Appearances and goals by club, season and competition
Club	Season	League			Emperor's Cup		J.League Cup		Total	
Club	Season	Division	Apps	Goals	Apps	Goals	Apps	Goals	Apps	Goals
Roasso Kumamoto	2014	J2 League	40	9	1	0	–		41	9
Shimizu S-Pulse	2015	J1 League	7	1	1	0	4	1	12	2
Shimizu S-Pulse	2016	J2 League	7	0	3	0	–		10	0
V-Varen Nagasaki	2017	J2 League	40	5	1	0	–		41	5
V-Varen Nagasaki	2018	J1 League	34	3	1	0	0	0	35	3
Career total			128	18	7	0	4	1	139	19
