= Morishige Takei =

Japanese composer (1890–1949)

Baron Morishige Takei 武井 守成
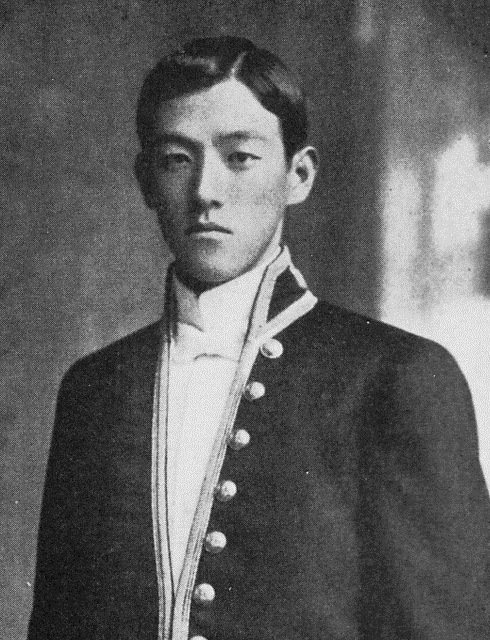
- Morishige Takei in 1913

Background information
- Born: October 11, 1890; Tottori, Japan
- Died: December 14, 1949 (aged 59)
- Genres: classical
- Occupations: 1917 "Officer of Ceremonies" in the Department of the Imperial Household; 1921 "Chief of the Music section of the Department of the Imperial Household"; 1946 "Grand Master of Ceremonies"; composer, conductor, musician
- Instruments: mandolin, guitar
- Years active: 1915–1949

Morishige Takei (武井 守成, Takei Morishige; 1890–1949) was a Japanese composer and court official during the reign of Emperor Showa.

== Biography ==
He studied Italian at Tokyo College of Language. After studying in Italy and discovering the mandolin and guitar, he returned to Japan and in 1915 established what would become the Sinfonia Mandolini Orchestra, a mandolin orchestra. The orchestra would continue (with breaks) through 1949, when he died. He became a composer, with 114 compositions for mandolin and guitar.

World War II affected music in Japan, through the National Mobilization Law of 1938. One of the effects of the law was to allow the government to assert control of music, banning western music and instruments, including the electric guitar, banjo and ukulele. In spite of this, Takei was able to maintain his mandolin-guitar orchestra until 1943. His orchestra, named the Orchestra Sinfonica Takei in 1923, was temporarily renamed Takei-Gakudan (shedding non-Japanese words in its name), December 1941. After the war, he rose higher in the imperial court. He continued the work of promoting the mandolin and guitar, giving a concert with his orchestra November 6, 1949. He fell ill at a rehearsal, however, on December 12 and died two days later.

== Fate of Takei's mandolin orchestra ==
The mandolin orchestra, founded by Morishige Takei is still in existence. After Takei's death, the Orquestra Sinfonica Takei (OST) was dissolved in December 1958, but then started up again in December 1959 under the name Murao Sugita Symphony Orchestra. After Mural Sugita died in July 1986, it was newly organized as Sugita Mura Yuu Memorial Regular Concert Organization. In May 1987 it was renamed Orquestra Sinfonica Tokyo (OST), which it remains today.

== Works ==
=== Mandolin orchestra ===
- Twilight, Op. 6 (1921)
- Morning Prelude, Op. 10 (1925) (co-produced with Akira Onuma and Akira Sugawara "From the Friend's Three Friends")
- Small Flowers Dancing, Op. 14 (1925)
- Late Spring, Op. 15 (1925)
- To a Dead Young Man, Op. 18 (1925)
- Fantasia "Impression of Korea", Op. 20 (1926)
- Small March "Louise", Op. 21 (1926)
- Spring Nostalgia, Op. 22 (1927)
- Remembering Carlle, Op. 23 (1927)
- Song of Early Autumn, Op. 26 (1927)
- Futaba of Album, Op. 30 (1929)
- Summer's Suite, Op. 31 (1928)
- Spring Festival Night, Op. 34 (1930)
- Hypocritical, Op.35 (1930)
- Flow, Op. 36 (1931)
- Evening Rain Shower, Op. 38 (1931)
- Dusk, Op. 41 (1931)
- Improvisation Song, Op. 42 (1932)
- Yellowling Flower, Op. 43 (1932)
- Big, Op. 45 (1939)
- Spring Sailing, Op. 46 (1940)
- Standing in Front of the House of the Martyrdom Chapel, Op. 47 (1940)
- Rain and Cosmos, Op. 49 (1941)
- Festival Town Corner, Op. 50 (1941)
- Akane, Op. 63 (1942)
- March March "Going through the Sky", Op. 64 (1942)
- Dew Small Diameter, Op. 68 (1942)
- Algae, Op. 69 (1942)
- The Fruit Jumps Off, Op. 70 (1942)
- Sonko, Op. 74 (1943)
- Insect Dance, Op. 80 (1943)
- Life Autumn, Op. 81 (1943)
- Breeze, Op. 108 (1947)
- Suite "Festival of Fruits", Op. 111 (1948)

=== Guitar Ensemble ===
- For the Morning Mist, Op. 76 (1943)

=== Mandolin solo piece ===
- Spring to Go, Op. 29 (1928)

=== Guitar solo ===
- Memories of Childhood, Op. 1 (1919)
- Field Walking, Op. 2 (1919)
- Harmonic Minuet, Op. 5 (1921) – arrangement for mandolin orchestra
- Song Dedicated to Tárrega, Op. 7 (1921)
- Improvisation Song, Op. 8 (1924)
- Today's Joy, Op. 9 (1924) – arrangement for mandolin orchestra (1925)
- A Visit to the Autumn Rain, Op. 11 (1924) – arrangement for mandolin orchestra (1925)
- Small Dances, Op. 12 (1924) – arrangement for guitar ensemble
- Fallen Leaf, Op. 27 (1927) – arrangement for mandolin orchestra (1928)
- Petals, Op. 28 (1928)
- Hill of Late Days, Op. 51 (1941)
- Along the Flow, Op. 52 (1941)
- Thinking About my Invisible Dream, Op. 53 (1941)
- Arrangement, Op. 54 (1941) – arrangement for mandolin orchestra (1941)
- Romanza, Op. 55 (1941)
- Scherzo, Op. 56 (1941)
- Capri Chetth No. 1, Op. 57 (1941)
- Four Preludes, Op. 58 (1941)
- Snow is Also Good, Op. 62 (1942)
- There is a Lotus, Op. 65 (1942)
- Izumi, Op. 66 (1942)
- Window of Rain, Op. 67 (1942)
- Akumo, Op. 71 (1942)
- Painting a Girl, Op. 72 (1942)
- Silent Verse, Op. 73 (1943)
- Under the Spring Light Op. 75 (1943) – arrangement for mandolin orchestra (1947)
- Wooden car, Op. 78 (1943)
- Cutting by lower three strings, Op. 79 (1943)
- Otone, Op. 82 (1944)
- Odori, Op. 83 (1944)
- Memorial, Op. 84 (1944)
- Clear morning, Op. 85 (1944)
- Dusky, Op. 86 (1944)
- Shō, Op. 87 (1944)
- Shibaki, Op. 88 (1944)
- Autumn's Fantasy, Op. 89 (1944)
- Variations on the Theme "The Moon in Wild Archeology", Op. 90 (1944)
- Fleas, Op. 92 (1945)
- Osmanthus, Op. 93 (1945) – arrangement for mandolin orchestra (1947)
- Winter Street Trees, Op. 94 (1945)
- A Woman Carrying Threads, Op. 95 (1945) – arrangement for mandolin orchestra (1947)
- Furnace Edge, Op. 96 (1946)
- Infant, Op. 97 (1946)
- Ukifune Cloud, Op. 98 (1946)
- Toshikanoka, Op. 99 (1946)
- Two Preludes, Op. 101 (1946)
- Memories of Torino, Op. 102 (1946)
- Torn Glass Door, Op. 103 (1946)
- Wine Alcohol, Op. 104 (1946)
- Butterflies Fell in the Water, Op. 105 (1947)
- One Night, Op. 106 (1947)
- Capri Chett No. 2, Op. 107 (1947)
- Yellow Flower, Op. 109 (1947)
- Easy Album, Op. 110 (1948)
- See the Stars, Op. 112 (1948)
- Album for Children, Op. 114 (1949)

=== Songs ===
- Fall color, Op. 60 (1941, Takada Mikuni ) – voice and guitar
- Fairy Phrase, Op. 100 (1946, Takada Mikuni) – voice and guitar

=== Choral ===
- Fall Three Themes, Op. 113 (1948, Takada triple noun) – chorus and mandolin orchestra
