= Masaya Tomizawa =

Japanese professional footballer

Masaya Tomizawa 富澤 雅也
Personal information
- Date of birth: 14 July 1993 (age 33)
- Place of birth: Kanagawa, Japan
- Height: 1.89 m (6 ft 2 in)
- Position: Goalkeeper

Team information
- Current team: Matsumoto Yamaga FC
- Number: 21

Youth career
- Onodai FC
- –2008: Machida JFC
- 2009–2011: Maebashi Ikuei High School

College career
Years	Team	Apps	(Gls)
2012–2015	Hosei University		

Senior career*
Years	Team	Apps	(Gls)
2016–2025	V-Varen Nagasaki	78	(0)
2026–	Matsumoto Yamaga FC	13	(0)
- * Club domestic league appearances and goals as of 24 August 2026

Masaya Tomizawa (富澤 雅也, Tomizawa Masaya; born 14 July 1993) is a Japanese professional footballer who plays as a goalkeeper for Matsumoto Yamaga FC.

== Career statistics ==
As of the start for 2025 season

Club	Season	League			Emperor's Cup		J.League Cup		Total	
Club	Season	Division	Apps	Goals	Apps	Goals	Apps	Goals	Apps	Goals
V-Varen Nagasaki	2016	J2 League	0	0	0	0	—		0	0
V-Varen Nagasaki	2017	J2 League	0	0	0	0	—		0	0
V-Varen Nagasaki	2018	J1 League	0	0	0	0	0	0	0	0
V-Varen Nagasaki	2019	J2 League	16	0	3	0	7	0	26	0
V-Varen Nagasaki	2020	J2 League	1	0	0	0	—		1	0
V-Varen Nagasaki	2021	J2 League	28	0	0	0	—		28	0
V-Varen Nagasaki	2022	J2 League	33	0	0	0	—		33	0
V-Varen Nagasaki	2023	J2 League	0	0	0	0	—		0	0
V-Varen Nagasaki	2024	J2 League	0	0	1	0	0	0	1	0
V-Varen Nagasaki	2025	J2 League	0	0	0	0	0	0	0	0
Career total			78	0	4	0	7	0	89	0
