= 2023 Mito HollyHock season =

Mito HollyHock
2023 season
- Chairman: Kunio Numata
- Manager: Yoshimi Hamasaki
- Stadium: K's denki Stadium Mito
- J2 League: 17th
- Emperor's Cup: Second round
- All statistics correct as of 18 May 2023.

The 2023 season was Mito HollyHock's 29th season in existence and the club's 23rd consecutive season in the second division of Japanese football. In addition to the domestic league, Mito HollyHock participated in this season's edition of the Emperor's Cup.

== Players ==
=== First-team squad ===
As of 17 May 2023.

Note: Flags indicate national team as defined under FIFA eligibility rules; some limited exceptions apply. Players may hold more than one non-FIFA nationality.

No.	Pos.	Nation	Player
1	GK	JPN	Koji Homma
2	DF	JPN	Koki Gotoda
3	DF	JPN	Koshi Osaki
4	DF	PHI	Jefferson Tabinas
5	DF	JPN	Takumi Kusumoto
6	MF	JPN	Kenshin Takagishi
7	MF	JPN	Hidetoshi Takeda (on loan from Urawa Reds)
8	MF	JPN	Reo Yasunaga
9	FW	JPN	Mizuki Ando
10	MF	JPN	Ryosuke Maeda
11	FW	JPN	Yuki Kusano
14	MF	JPN	Motoki Ohara (on loan from Sanfrecce Hiroshima)
16	MF	JPN	Ren Inoue
17	MF	JPN	Ryo Niizato
19	MF	JPN	Koichi Murata
20	FW	JPN	Kaito Umeda

No.	Pos.	Nation	Player
21	DF	JPN	Nao Yamada
22	DF	JPN	Kazuma Nagai
23	FW	JPN	Shimon Teranuma
25	MF	JPN	Fumiya Unoki (on loan from Kashiwa Reysol)
26	DF	JPN	Hayate Matsuda
28	GK	JPN	Louis Yamaguchi
29	DF	JPN	Yota Tanabe
30	FW	JPN	Soki Tokuno ^{DSP}
33	GK	JPN	Ryusei Haruna
34	MF	JPN	Fumiya Sugiura
35	GK	JPN	John Higashi (on loan from Nagoya Grampus)
38	FW	JPN	Shoji Toyama (on loan from Gamba Osaka)
39	MF	JPN	Kaiyo Yanagimachi
40	DF	JPN	Takaya Kuroishi
41	GK	JPN	Kaiho Nakayama
49	FW	JPN	Yusei Uchida

=== Out on loan ===
Note: Flags indicate national team as defined under FIFA eligibility rules; some limited exceptions apply. Players may hold more than one non-FIFA nationality.

No.	Pos.	Nation	Player
—	DF	JPN	Keita Matsuda (on loan at FC Osaka)
—	MF	JPN	Shoma Otoizumi (on loan at Nagano Parceiro)

== Transfers ==
Transfers in
Join on	Pos.	Player	Moving from	Transfer type
16 May	GK	(Japan) John Higashi	(Japan) Nagoya Grampus	Loan transfer
Pre-season	GK	(Japan) Ryusei Haruna	(Japan) Cerezo Osaka U18s	Free transfer
Pre-season	DF	(Japan) Keita Matsuda	(Japan) Toyo University	Free transfer
Pre-season	DF	(Japan) Kazuma Nagai	(Japan) Kyoto Sanga	Full transfer
Pre-season	DF	(Japan) Yota Tanabe	(Japan) Ococias Kyoto	Loan return
Pre-season	MF	(Japan) Reo Yasunaga	(Japan) Yokohama FC	Full transfer
Pre-season	MF	(Japan) Ren Inoue	(Japan) Toyo University	Free transfer
Pre-season	MF	(Japan) Hidetoshi Takeda	(Japan) Urawa Red Diamonds	Loan transfer
Pre-season	MF	(Japan) Motoki Ohara	(Japan) Sanfrecce Hiroshima	Loan transfer
Pre-season	FW	(Japan) Yuki Kusano	(Japan) FC Ryukyu	Full transfer
Pre-season	FW	(Japan) Shimon Teranuma	(Japan) Toin University of Yokohama	Free transfer
Pre-season	FW	(Japan) Yusei Uchida	Mito HollyHock U18s	Promotion

Transfers out
Leave on	Pos.	Player	Moving to	Transfer type
17 Mar	DF	(Japan) Keita Matsuda	(Japan) FC Osaka	Loan transfer
Pre-season	GK	(Japan) Akihito Ozawa	(Japan) Blaublitz Akita	Free transfer
Pre-season	DF	(Japan) Yuto Mori	(Japan) Kamatamare Sanuki	Full transfer
Pre-season	DF	(Japan) Yoshitake Suzuki	(Japan) Fagiano Okayama	Full transfer
Pre-season	DF	(Germany) Leonard Brodersen	(Germany) Teutonia Ottensen	Free transfer
Pre-season	DF	(Japan) SteviaEgbus Mikuni	(Japan) FC Gifu	Free transfer
Pre-season	MF	(Japan) Yutaka Soneda	(Japan) Ehime FC	Full transfer
Pre-season	MF	(Japan) Kaito Hirata	(Japan) ReinMeer Aomori	Free transfer
Pre-season	MF	(Japan) Shoma Otoizumi	(Japan) Nagano Parceiro	Loan transfer
Pre-season	MF	(Japan) Naoki Tsubaki	(Japan) Yokohama F. Marinos	Loan expiration
Pre-season	MF	(Japan) Kodai Dohi	(Japan) Sanfrecce Hiroshima	Loan expiration
Pre-season	MF	(Japan) Jun Kanakubo	–	Retirement
Pre-season	FW	(Japan) Kosuke Kinoshita	(Japan) Kyoto Sanga	Full transfer

== Competitions ==
=== Overview ===
Competition	First match	Last match	Starting round	Record							
Competition	First match	Last match	Starting round	Pld	W	D	L	GF	GA	GD	Win %
J2 League	19 February 2023	12 November 2023	Matchday 1	20	6	5	9	22	36	−14	30.00
Emperor's Cup	7 June 2023		Second round	1	1	0	0	1	0	+1	100.00
Total				21	7	5	9	23	36	−13	33.33

Last updated: 11 June 2023
Source: Soccerway

=== J2 League ===
==== League table ====
Pos	Team	Pld	W	D	L	GF	GA	GD	Pts
15	Tokushima Vortis	42	10	19	13	43	53	−10	49
16	Vegalta Sendai	42	12	12	18	48	61	−13	48
17	Mito HollyHock	42	11	14	17	49	66	−17	47
18	Iwaki FC	42	12	11	19	45	69	−24	47
19	Tochigi SC	42	10	14	18	39	47	−8	44

Source: Meiji Yasuda J2 League, J.League Data Site
Rules for classification: 1) Points; 2) Goal difference; 3) Goals scored; 4) Head-to-head points; 5) Head-to-head goal difference; 6) Head-to-head goal scored; 7) Fair-play points.

==== Results summary ====
Overall								Home						Away					
Pld	W	D	L	GF	GA	GD	Pts	W	D	L	GF	GA	GD	W	D	L	GF	GA	GD
16	4	5	7	16	30	−14	17	1	3	4	10	20	−10	3	2	3	6	10	−4

Last updated: 11 June 2023.
Source: Worldfootball

==== Results by round ====
Round	1	2	3	4	5	6	7	8	9	10	11	12	13	14	15	16
Ground	A	H	H	A	A	H	A	H	A	H	A	H	A	H	H	A
Result	D	D	D	L	D	L	W	L	W	L	W	L	L	W	D	L
Position	10	12	13	18	20	21	17	18	16	18	15	16	18	15	16	17

Updated to match(es) played on 11 June 2023. Source: Worldfootball
A = Away; H = Home; W = Win; D = Draw; L = Loss

==== Matches ====
The league fixtures were announced on 20 January 2023.

18 February 2023 1	Shimizu S-Pulse	0–0	Mito HollyHock	Shimizu
12:00	Ibayashi (yellow card) 38'	Report	Murata (yellow card) 55'	Stadium: IAI Stadium Nihondaira; Attendance: 14,324; Referee: Kazuyoshi Enomoto

26 February 2023 2	Mito HollyHock	2–2	Iwaki FC	Mito
13:00	Umeda 54'; Teranuma 68'	Report	Miyamoto (yellow card) 37'; Tanimura 59'; Arita 74'	Stadium: K's denki Stadium Mito; Attendance: 5,028; Referee: Yuzo Sutani

5 March 2023 3	Mito HollyHock	1–1	Fagiano Okayama	Mito
13:00	Tabinas (yellow card) 8'; Takeda 50'	Report	Kimura 42'	Stadium: K's denki Stadium Mito; Attendance: 3,104; Referee: Hiroyoshi Takeyama

12 March 2023 4	Machida Zelvia	3–0	Mito HollyHock	Machida
12:00	Erik 14'; Takae (yellow card) 56'; Takahashi 64'; Araki 76'	Report	Ando (yellow card) 26'	Stadium: Machida GION Stadium; Attendance: 3,882; Referee: Koei Koya

19 March 2023 5	Blaublitz Akita	1–1	Mito HollyHock	Akita
12:00	Mizutani 33'; Morooka (yellow card) 45'	Report	Yamada (yellow card) 6'; Unoki (yellow card) 14'; Umeda (yellow card) 76'; Teranuma 90+2'	Stadium: Soyu Stadium; Attendance: 2,955; Referee: Keisuke Nobori

26 March 2023 6	Mito HollyHock	2–4	Ventforet Kofu	Mito
14:00	Ohara 32'; Teranuma 77'	Report	Matsumoto (yellow card) 31' (goal) 39'; Mitsuhira 48'; Utaka 49', 90+1'; Inoue (yellow card) 58'; Miyazaki (yellow card) 90+4'	Stadium: K's denki Stadium Mito; Attendance: 2,475; Referee: Dai Matsumoto

2 April 2023 7	Montedio Yamagata	0–1	Mito HollyHock	Tendō
13:00	Kokubu (yellow card) 34'; Yamada (yellow card) 47'	Report	Matsuda 36'; Takeda (yellow card) 86'	Stadium: ND Soft Stadium Yamagata; Attendance: 6,916; Referee: Keigo Sendachi

8 April 2023 8	Mito HollyHock	1–5	Júbilo Iwata	Mito
16:00	Tabinas (yellow card) 27'; Teranuma 70'; Matsuda (yellow card) 90+2'	Report	Dudu Pacheco 8', 16'; Uehara 35'; Matsubara 58'; Goto 59'; Ogawa (yellow card) 84'	Stadium: K's denki Stadium Mito; Attendance: 4,002; Referee: Atsushi Kamimura

12 April 2023 9	Tokushima Vortis	0–2	Mito HollyHock	Naruto
19:00	Watari (yellow card) 14'	Report	Toyama (yellow card) 33', (goal) 59'; Takeda 69'; Kusumoto (yellow card) 72'	Stadium: Pocarisweat Stadium; Attendance: 3,304; Referee: Reo Tanaka

16 April 2023 10	Mito HollyHock	1–4	Fujieda MYFC	Mito
15:00	Osaki 73'	Report	Watanabe 15'; Mizuno 43'; Ogasawara 67'; Yamura 78'	Stadium: K's denki Stadium Mito; Attendance: 2,433; Referee: Tomokazu Sato

23 April 2023 11	Oita Trinita	0–1	Mito HollyHock	Oita
14:00		Report	Maeda (yellow card) 45+2'; Sugiura 55'; Yamaguchi (yellow card) 83'	Stadium: Resonac Dome Oita; Attendance: 8,273; Referee: Yosuke Kubota

29 April 2023 12	Mito HollyHock	0–2	Tokyo Verdy	Mito
17:00	Yamada (yellow card) 6'	Report	Engels (yellow card) 4'; Tsunashima (yellow card) 18'; Miyahara (yellow card) 45+1'; Fukazawa 79'; Vásquez 83'; Hayashi (yellow card) 90+4'	Stadium: K's denki Stadium Mito; Attendance: 3,656; Referee: Koji Takasaki

3 May 2023 13	V-Varen Nagasaki	4–0	Mito HollyHock	Isahaya
14:00	Kushibiki 39'; Kato 45'; Clayson 66'; Cristiano da Silva 78'	Report		Stadium: Transcosmos Stadium Nagasaki; Attendance: 12,413; Referee: Hirokazu Otsubo

7 May 2023 14	Mito HollyHock	1–0	Vegalta Sendai	Mito
15:00	Kusano 50'	Report	Akiyama (yellow card) 60'	Stadium: K's denki Stadium Mito; Attendance: 2,886; Referee: Hajime Matsuo

13 May 2023 15	Mito HollyHock	2–2	Tochigi SC	Mito
17:00	Ohara 59'; Kusano 81'	Report	Yano 14'; Fukumori 67' (yellow card) (yellow-red card) 14'; Okazaki (yellow card) 82'; Miyazaki (yellow card) 90+2'	Stadium: K's denki Stadium Mito; Attendance: 3,350; Referee: Yudai Yamamoto

17 May 2023 16	Thespakusatsu Gunma	2–1	Mito HollyHock	Maebashi
19:00	Hiramatsu 64'; Kawakami 75'	Report	Umeda 6'	Stadium: Shoda Shoyu Stadium Gunma; Attendance: 2,090; Referee: Tetsuro Yoshida

21 May 2023 17	Mito HollyHock	0–3	Roasso Kumamoto	Mito
15:00		Report	Ishikawa 7', 54'; Kamimura 76'	Stadium: K's denki Stadium Mito; Attendance: 2,995; Referee: Keisuke Nobori

28 May 2023 18	Mito HollyHock	0–1	Renofa Yamaguchi	Mito
15:00		Report	Tanaka 61' (pen.)	Stadium: K's denki Stadium Mito; Attendance: 2,988; Referee: Reo Tanaka

3 June 2023 19	Omiya Ardija	v	Mito HollyHock	Saitama
14:00		Report		Stadium: NACK5 Stadium Omiya

11 June 2023 20	Mito HollyHock	v	JEF United Chiba	Mito
16:00		Report		Stadium: K's denki Stadium Mito

17 June 2023 21	Zweigen Kanazawa	v	Mito HollyHock	Kanazawa
18:00		Report		Stadium: Ishikawa Kanazawa Stadium

24 June 2023 22	Mito HollyHock	v	Machida Zelvia	Mito
18:00		Report		Stadium: K's denki Stadium Mito

=== Emperor's Cup ===
7 June 2023 Second round	Mito HollyHock	1–0	Renofa Yamaguchi	Mito
19:00	Toyama 88'	Report; Report		Stadium: K's denki Stadium Mito; Attendance: 902; Referee: Takuto Okabe
