= 2022 Mito HollyHock season =

Mito HollyHock
2022 season
- Manager: Tadahiro Akiba
- Stadium: K's denki Stadium Mito
- J2 League: 13th
- Emperor's Cup: 2nd round
- Top goalscorer: League: Kosuke Kinoshita (12 goals); All: Kosuke Kinoshita (12 goals)
- Highest home attendance: 2–1 vs Thespakusatsu Gunma; J2 League, Round 42 (6,296)
- Lowest home attendance: 2–0 vs Roasso Kumamoto; J2 League, Round 6 (1,781)
- Average home league attendance: 3,140
Home colours	Away colours

The 2022 Mito HollyHock season was the 25th straight season since being introduced in 1998 to a national-level league, the Japan Football League. It was also the 23rd consecutive season that Mito HollyHock has played in the J2 League.

== Squad ==
As of 26 August 2022. '

Note: Flags indicate national team as defined under FIFA eligibility rules; some limited exceptions apply. Players may hold more than one non-FIFA nationality.

No.	Pos.	Nation	Player
1	GK	JPN	Koji Homma
2	DF	JPN	Koki Gotoda
3	DF	JPN	Koshi Osaki
4	DF	PHI	Jefferson Tabinas
5	MF	JPN	Reo Yasunaga (on loan from Yokohama FC)
7	MF	JPN	Yutaka Soneda
8	MF	JPN	Yuto Mori
9	FW	JPN	Mizuki Ando
10	MF	JPN	Jun Kanakubo
11	MF	JPN	Kazuma Takai
13	DF	JPN	Takumi Kusumoto
14	MF	JPN	Naoki Tsubaki (on loan from Yokohama F. Marinos)
15	FW	JPN	Kosuke Kinoshita
16	MF	JPN	Ryosuke Maeda
17	MF	JPN	Ryo Niizato
18	MF	JPN	Shoma Otoizumi
19	MF	JPN	Koichi Murata
20	FW	JPN	Kaito Umeda

No.	Pos.	Nation	Player
21	DF	JPN	Nao Yamada
22	MF	JPN	Kodai Dohi (on loan from Sanfrecce Hiroshima)
23	FW	JPN	Shimon Teranuma ^{DSP}
28	GK	JPN	Louis Yamaguchi
30	MF	JPN	Kenshin Takagishi
32	GK	JPN	Akihito Ozawa
34	MF	JPN	Fumiya Sugiura
37	MF	JPN	Fumiya Unoki (on loan from Kashiwa Reysol)
38	FW	JPN	Shoji Toyama (on loan from Gamba Osaka)
39	MF	JPN	Kaiyo Yanagimachi
40	DF	JPN	Takaya Kuroishi
41	GK	JPN	Kaiho Nakayama
43	MF	JPN	Yoshitake Suzuki
44	MF	JPN	Ginji Tanaka ^{Type 2}
47	DF	JPN	Hayate Matsuda
48	DF	GER	Leonard Brodersen
49	FW	JPN	Yusei Uchida ^{Type 2}

=== Out on loan ===
Note: Flags indicate national team as defined under FIFA eligibility rules; some limited exceptions apply. Players may hold more than one non-FIFA nationality.

No.	Pos.	Nation	Player
29	DF	JPN	Yota Tanabe (on loan at Ococias Kyoto)
33	DF	JPN	Stevia Egbus Mikuni (on loan at FC Gifu)
—	MF	JPN	Kaito Hirata (on loan at ReinMeer Aomori)

== League table ==
Pos	Team	Pld	W	D	L	GF	GA	GD	Pts
11	V-Varen Nagasaki	42	15	11	16	50	54	−4	56
12	Blaublitz Akita	42	15	11	16	39	46	−7	56
13	Mito HollyHock	42	14	12	16	47	46	+1	54
14	Zweigen Kanazawa	42	13	13	16	56	69	−13	52
15	Machida Zelvia	42	14	9	19	51	50	+1	51

Source: Meiji Yasuda J2 League, J.League Data Site
Rules for classification: 1) Points; 2) Goal difference; 3) Goals scored; 4) Head-to-head points; 5) Head-to-head goal difference; 6) Head-to-head goal scored; 7) Fair-play points.

== J2 League ==
The following shows all the matches they played in this year's J2 edition.
Mito HollyHock results for 2022: (Japanese)

Match	Date	Team	Score	Team	Venue	Attendance
1	09.03.2022	Oita Trinita	1–1	Mito HollyHock	Showa Denko Dome Oita	3,544
2	27.02.2022	Mito HollyHock	2–3	Vegalta Sendai	K's denki Stadium	4,673
3	06.03.2022	Mito HollyHock	0–1	Blaublitz Akita	K's denki Stadium	2,504
4	13.03.2022	Yokohama FC	3–2	Mito HollyHock	NHK Spring Stadium	3,823
5	19.03.2022	FC Ryukyu	1–2	Mito HollyHock	Tapic Kenso Hiyagon Stadium	1,543
6	26.03.2022	Mito HollyHock	2–0	Roasso Kumamoto	K's denki Stadium	1,731
7	30.03.2022	Mito HollyHock	0–1	Tochigi SC	K's denki Stadium	2,198
8	03.04.2022	Thespakusatsu Gunma	2–1	Mito HollyHock	Shoda Shoyu Stadium Gunma	2,091
9	10.04.2022	Zweigen Kanazawa	1–1	Mito HollyHock	Ishikawa Athletics Stadium	2,216
10	17.04.2022	Mito HollyHock	1–1	Tokushima Vortis	K's denki Stadium	2,302
11	23.04.2022	Mito HollyHock	3–2	Renofa Yamaguchi	K's denki Stadium	1,975
12	27.04.2022	V-Varen Nagasaki	1–0	Mito HollyHock	Transcosmos Stadium Nagasaki	2,866
13	30.04.2022	Mito HollyHock	2–1	Ventforet Kofu	K's denki Stadium	3,634
14	04.05.2022	Fagiano Okayama	2–1	Mito HollyHock	City Light Stadium	7,629
15	08.05.2022	Mito HollyHock	0–0	Machida Zelvia	K's denki Stadium	3,327
16	14.05.2022	Tokyo Verdy	0–2	Mito HollyHock	Ajinomoto Stadium	2,728
17	21.05.2022	Mito HollyHock	3–0	Iwate Grulla Morioka	K's denki Stadium	2,678
18	25.05.2022	Mito HollyHock	0–3	Albirex Niigata	K's denki Stadium	2,464
19	29.05.2022	JEF United Chiba	2–1	Mito HollyHock	Fukuda Denshi Arena	4,757
20	05.06.2022	Omiya Ardija	0–2	Mito HollyHock	NACK5 Stadium Omiya	5,521
21	12.06.2022	Mito HollyHock	1–0	Montedio Yamagata	K's denki Stadium	3,797
22	18.06.2022	Roasso Kumamoto	0-0	Mito HollyHock	Egao Kenko Stadium	2,724
23	25.06.2022	Mito HollyHock	1–1	Fagiano Okayama	K's denki Stadium	2,777
24	02.07.2022	Mito HollyHock	1–2	Yokohama FC	K's denki Stadium	3,989
25	06.07.2022	Machida Zelvia	2–3	Mito HollyHock	Machida GION Stadium	1,814
26	10.07.2022	Thespakusatsu Gunma	0-2	Mito HollyHock	Shoda Shoyu Stadium Gunma	1,625
27	16.07.2022	Ventforet Kofu	1–1	Mito HollyHock	JIT Recycle Ink Stadium	3,551
28	23.08.2022	Mito HollyHock	2–0	Oita Trinita	K's denki Stadium	2,111
29	30.07.2022	Mito HollyHock	1–0	Omiya Ardija	K's denki Stadium	3,396
30	07.08.2022	Blaublitz Akita	1–1	Mito HollyHock	Soyu Stadium	2,188
31	21.09.2022	Mito HollyHock	1-2	Tokyo Verdy	K's denki Stadium	1,812
32	20.08.2022	Renofa Yamaguchi	1–0	Mito HollyHock	Ishin Me-Life Stadium	3,663
33	27.08.2022	Mito HollyHock	0–0	FC Ryukyu	K's denki Stadium	3,126
34	03.09.2022	Vegalta Sendai	1–2	Mito HollyHock	Yurtec Stadium Sendai	7,139
35	10.09.2022	Iwate Grulla Morioka	1–0	Mito HollyHock	Iwagin Stadium	1,886
36	14.09.2022	Mito HollyHock	0–1	V-Varen Nagasaki	K's denki Stadium	2,160
37	18.09.2022	Albirex Niigata	2–0	Mito HollyHock	Denka Big Swan Stadium	18,439
38	25.09.2022	Tokushima Vortis	1–1	Mito HollyHock	Pocarisweat Stadium	4,932
39	02.10.2022	Mito HollyHock	0–1	JEF United Chiba	K's denki Stadium	5,476
40	09.10.2022	Montedio Yamagata	0–0	Mito HollyHock	ND Soft Stadium Yamagata	6,885
41	15.10.2022	Tochigi SC	2–3	Mito HollyHock	Kanseki Stadium Tochigi	12,490
42	22.10.2022	Mito HollyHock	2–1	Thespakusatsu Gunma	K's denki Stadium	6,296

== Emperor's Cup ==
As they were in 2022 a J2 League team, they were qualified to the Emperor's Cup automatically, and directly placed into the second round, with no need of going through qualification rounds. They faced another J2 League team in their first match and lost on extra-time.

Match	Date	Team	Score	Team	Venue	Attendance	Notes
2nd round	01.06.2022	Mito HollyHock	1–2	Renofa Yamaguchi	K's denki Stadium	845	Lost after extra time
