= 2023 Thespakusatsu Gunma season =

Thespakusatsu Gunma
2023 season
- Chairman: Tomohiko Nara
- Manager: Tsuyoshi Otsuki
- Stadium: Shoda Shoyu Stadium Gunma
- J2 League: 5th
- Emperor's Cup: Second round
- Top goalscorer: Motoki Nagakura (4)
- Highest home attendance: 4,371 (Ventforet Kofu), Round 12
- Lowest home attendance: 1,719 (Renofa Yamaguchi), Round 14
| Home colours | Away colours |
- All statistics correct as of 18 May 2023.

The 2023 season was Thespakusatsu Gunma's 28th season in existence and the club's fourth consecutive season in the second division of Japanese football. In addition to the domestic league, Thespakusatsu Gunma will participate in this season's edition of the Emperor's Cup. This season was last name as Thespakusatsu Gunma for 2023 and rebranding to Thespa Gunma from 2024 season.

== Players ==
=== First-team squad ===
As of 12 May 2023.

Note: Flags indicate national team as defined under FIFA eligibility rules; some limited exceptions apply. Players may hold more than one non-FIFA nationality.

| No. | Pos. | Nation | Player |
|---|---|---|---|
| 1 | GK | JPN | Keiki Shimizu |
| 2 | DF | JPN | Hayate Shirowa |
| 3 | DF | JPN | Hiroto Hatao |
| 4 | MF | JPN | Yuki Kawakami |
| 5 | MF | JPN | Chie Edoojon Kawakami |
| 6 | MF | JPN | Tatsuya Uchida |
| 7 | FW | JPN | Riyo Kawamoto |
| 8 | MF | JPN | Yuzo Iwakami |
| 9 | FW | JPN | Shuto Kitagawa |
| 10 | MF | JPN | Ryo Sato |
| 13 | FW | JPN | Hayate Take (on loan from Blaublitz Akita) |
| 14 | MF | JPN | Tomoyuki Shiraishi |
| 15 | MF | JPN | Koki Kazama |
| 17 | MF | JPN | Atsuki Yamanaka |
| 18 | FW | JPN | Luna Iwamoto |
| 19 | DF | JPN | Kazuma Okamoto |
| 20 | MF | JPN | Yudai Nakata |

| No. | Pos. | Nation | Player |
|---|---|---|---|
| 21 | GK | JPN | Masatoshi Kushibiki |
| 22 | DF | JPN | Yuriya Takahashi |
| 23 | FW | JPN | Shu Hiramatsu |
| 24 | DF | JPN | Shuichi Sakai |
| 27 | MF | JPN | Koji Okumura |
| 28 | FW | JPN | Motoki Nagakura |
| 29 | DF | JPN | Ryota Tagashira ^{DSP} |
| 30 | FW | JPN | Toranosuke Onoseki |
| 33 | DF | JPN | Hajime Hosogai |
| 36 | DF | JPN | Daiki Nakashio |
| 38 | MF | JPN | Taiki Amagasa |
| 39 | FW | JPN | Akito Takagi |
| 41 | MF | JPN | Yui Tabei |
| 42 | GK | JPN | Ryo Ishii |
| 44 | GK | JPN | Koji Yamada |
| 50 | DF | JPN | Kenta Kikuchi |

=== Out on loan ===
Note: Flags indicate national team as defined under FIFA eligibility rules; some limited exceptions apply. Players may hold more than one non-FIFA nationality.

| No. | Pos. | Nation | Player |
|---|---|---|---|
| — | MF | JPN | Shumpei Fukahori (on loan at Ehime FC) |
| — | MF | JPN | Kazune Kubota (on loan at FC Gifu) |
| — | MF | JPN | Keita Toyama (on loan at Tiamo Hirakata) |

== Transfers ==
Transfers in
| Join on | Pos. | Player | Moving from | Transfer type |
|---|---|---|---|---|
| 12 May | DF | (Japan) Ryota Tagashira | (Japan) Toyo University | Loan transfer; DSP |
| Pre-season | GK | (Japan) Ryo Ishii | (Japan) Urawa Red Diamonds | Free transfer |
| Pre-season | DF | (Japan) Daiki Nakashio | (Japan) Yokohama FC | Full transfer |
| Pre-season | DF | (Japan) Shuichi Sakai | (Japan) Roasso Kumamoto | Full transfer |
| Pre-season | DF | (Japan) Kenta Kikuchi | (Japan) Senshu University | Free transfer |
| Pre-season | MF | (Japan) Chie Edoojon Kawakami | (Japan) Tokushima Vortis | Full transfer |
| Pre-season | MF | (Japan) Yudai Nakata | (Japan) Tiamo Hirakata | Loan return |
| Pre-season | FW | (Japan) Ryo Sato | (Japan) Giravanz Kitakyushu | Full transfer |
| Pre-season | FW | (Japan) Luna Iwamoto | (Japan) Kanto Gakuin University | Free transfer |
| Pre-season | FW | (Japan) Toranosuke Onoseki | (Japan) Takasaki UHW HS | Free transfer |
| Pre-season | FW | (Japan) Hayate Take | (Japan) Blaublitz Akita | Loan transfer |

Transfers out
| Leave on | Pos. | Player | Moving to | Transfer type |
|---|---|---|---|---|
| Pre-season | GK | (Japan) Genta Ito | (Japan) Vissel Kobe | Loan expiration |
| Pre-season | DF | (Japan) Masaya Kojima | (Japan) Zweigen Kanazawa | Full transfer |
| Pre-season | DF | (Japan) So Hirao | (Japan) MIO Biwako Shiga | Free transfer |
| Pre-season | DF | (Japan) Hayato Abe | (Japan) Tiamo Hirakata | Free transfer |
| Pre-season | DF | (Japan) Yuya Takagi | (Japan) Yokohama FC | Loan expiration |
| Pre-season | DF | (Japan) Yuta Fujii | – | Contract expiration |
| Pre-season | MF | (Japan) Junya Kato | (Japan) Zweigen Kanazawa | Full transfer |
| Pre-season | MF | (Japan) Toshiya Tanaka | (Japan) Renofa Yamaguchi | Full transfer |
| Pre-season | MF | (Japan) Yuto Nakayama | (Japan) Criacao Shinjuku | Full transfer |
| Pre-season | MF | (Japan) Shumpei Fukahori | (Japan) Ehime FC | Loan transfer |
| Pre-season | MF | (Japan) Kazune Kubota | (Japan) FC Gifu | Loan transfer |
| Pre-season | FW | (Japan) Kohei Shin | (Japan) Nagano Parceiro | Free transfer |
| Pre-season | FW | (Japan) Ryuichi Ichiki | (Japan) Okinawa SV | Free transfer |
| Pre-season | FW | (Japan) Kodai Watanabe | (Japan) Vonds Ichihara | Free transfer |
| Pre-season | FW | (Japan) Yuya Mitsunaga | (Japan) Shinagawa CC | Free transfer |
| Pre-season | FW | (Japan) Kunitomo Suzuki | (Japan) Matsumoto Yamaga | Loan expiration |

== Competitions ==
=== Overview ===
| Competition | First match | Last match | Starting round | Final position | Record | | | | | | | |
| Competition | First match | Last match | Starting round | Final position | Pld | W | D | L | GF | GA | GD | Win % |
|---|---|---|---|---|---|---|---|---|---|---|---|---|
| J2 League | 19 February 2023 | 12 November 2023 | Matchday 1 | | 25 | 9 | 9 | 7 | 28 | 27 | +1 | 36.00 |
| Emperor's Cup | 7 June 2023 | | Second round | Second round | 1 | 0 | 0 | 1 | 1 | 2 | −1 | 0.00 |
| Total | | | | | 26 | 9 | 9 | 8 | 29 | 29 | +0 | 34.62 |

Last updated: 9 July 2023
Source: Soccerway

=== J2 League ===
==== League table ====
| Pos | Team | Pld | W | D | L | GF | GA | GD | Pts |
|---|---|---|---|---|---|---|---|---|---|
| 9 | Oita Trinita | 42 | 17 | 11 | 14 | 54 | 56 | −2 | 62 |
| 10 | Fagiano Okayama | 42 | 13 | 19 | 10 | 49 | 49 | 0 | 58 |
| 11 | Thespakusatsu Gunma | 42 | 14 | 15 | 13 | 44 | 44 | 0 | 57 |
| 12 | Fujieda MYFC | 42 | 14 | 10 | 18 | 61 | 72 | −11 | 52 |
| 13 | Blaublitz Akita | 42 | 12 | 15 | 15 | 37 | 44 | −7 | 51 |

Source: Meiji Yasuda J2 League, J.League Data Site
Rules for classification: 1) Points; 2) Goal difference; 3) Goals scored; 4) Head-to-head points; 5) Head-to-head goal difference; 6) Head-to-head goal scored; 7) Fair-play points.

==== Results summary ====
| Overall | | | | | | | | Home | | | | | | Away | | | | | |
| Pld | W | D | L | GF | GA | GD | Pts | W | D | L | GF | GA | GD | W | D | L | GF | GA | GD |
|---|---|---|---|---|---|---|---|---|---|---|---|---|---|---|---|---|---|---|---|
| 20 | 8 | 5 | 7 | 22 | 23 | −1 | 29 | 5 | 3 | 2 | 9 | 6 | +3 | 3 | 2 | 5 | 13 | 17 | −4 |

Last updated: 11 June 2023.
Source: Worldfootball

==== Results by round ====
| Round | 1 | 2 | 3 | 4 | 5 | 6 | 7 | 8 | 9 | 10 | 11 | 12 | 13 | 14 | 15 | 16 | 17 | 18 | 19 | 20 |
|---|---|---|---|---|---|---|---|---|---|---|---|---|---|---|---|---|---|---|---|---|
| Ground | H | A | A | H | H | A | A | H | A | A | H | H | A | H | A | H | A | H | A | H |
| Result | D | L | D | W | L | W | W | W | W | L | D | W | L | W | L | W | L | D | D | L |
| Position | 10 | 20 | 18 | 13 | 18 | 10 | 6 | 5 | 4 | 6 | 7 | 5 | 6 | 5 | 6 | 5 | | | | |

Updated to match(es) played on 11 June 2023. Source: Worldfootball
A = Away; H = Home; W = Win; D = Draw; L = Loss

==== Matches ====
The league fixtures were announced on 20 January 2023.

| 18 February 2023 1 | Thespakusatsu Gunma | 0–0 | Blaublitz Akita | Maebashi |
| 14:00 | | Report | Morooka (yellow card) 26'; Niwa (yellow card) 90+1' | Stadium: Shoda Shoyu Stadium Gunma; Attendance: 3,374; Referee: Yuzo Sutani |

| 26 February 2023 2 | Machida Zelvia | 2–0 | Thespakusatsu Gunma | Machida |
| 14:00 | Ikeda 38'; Onaga 84' | Report | Sakai (yellow card) 7'; Kawamoto (yellow card) 37'; Amagasa (yellow card) 79' | Stadium: Machida GION Stadium; Attendance: 3,160; Referee: Shuhei Shimizu |

| 5 March 2023 3 | JEF United Chiba | 2–2 | Thespakusatsu Gunma | Chiba |
| 14:03 | Komori 36'; Tsubaki 62'; Takahashi (yellow card) 81'; Suzuki (yellow card) 89' | Report | Take 4'; Kawamoto (yellow card) 21'; Hosogai (yellow card) 24'; Hatao 45+3' | Stadium: Fukuda Denshi Arena; Attendance: 6,510; Referee: Koji Takasaki |

| 12 March 2023 4 | Thespakusatsu Gunma | 1–0 | Montedio Yamagata | Maebashi |
| 17:03 | Take 5'; Amagasa (yellow card) 72'; Hosogai (yellow card) 89' | Report | Noda (yellow card) 67'; Kawai (yellow card) 71' | Stadium: Shoda Shoyu Stadium Gunma; Attendance: 3,197; Referee: Yosuke Kubota |

| 19 March 2023 5 | Thespakusatsu Gunma | 1–2 | Vegalta Sendai | Maebashi |
| 14:03 | Uchida 57' | Report | Goke 33'; Yamada (yellow card) 62'; Kim Tae-hyeon 73' | Stadium: Shoda Shoyu Stadium Gunma; Attendance: 3,917; Referee: Tetsuro Yoshida |

| 29 March 2023 6 | Shimizu S-Pulse | 1–3 | Thespakusatsu Gunma | Shizuoka |
| 19:03 | Akira Silvano Disaro 29'; Shirasaki (yellow card) 75' | Report | Hatao 25'; Sato 31'; Nagakura 53' | Stadium: IAI Stadium Nihondaira; Attendance: 8,482; Referee: Reo Tanaka |

| 2 April 2023 7 | Tochigi SC | 1–2 | Thespakusatsu Gunma | Utsunomiya |
| 14:00 | Kanbe (yellow card) 37' (yellow-red card); Kurosaki (yellow card) 57'; Fukumori 69' | Report | Sato 77'; Kazama 87' | Stadium: Kanseki Stadium Tochigi; Attendance: 4,473; Referee: Shu Kawamata |

| 8 April 2023 8 | Thespakusatsu Gunma | 1–0 | V-Varen Nagasaki | Maebashi |
| 14:03 | Sato 35'; Nagakura (yellow card) 80' | Report | Juanma (yellow card) 83' | Stadium: Shoda Shoyu Stadium Gunma; Attendance: 2,264; Referee: Keisuke Nobori |

| 12 April 2023 9 | Omiya Ardija | 0–1 | Thespakusatsu Gunma | Saitama |
| 19:03 | Izumisawa (yellow card) 1'; Shibayama (yellow card) 34' | Report | Amagasa (yellow card) 20'; Hiramatsu 46' | Stadium: NACK5 Stadium Omiya; Attendance: 4,358; Referee: Hiroyoshi Takayama |

| 16 April 2023 10 | Iwaki FC | 2–1 | Thespakusatsu Gunma | Iwaki |
| 14:03 | Arita 6', 49'; Kaburaki (yellow card) 13'; Endo (yellow card) 78' | Report | Nagakura 64' | Stadium: Iwaki Greenfield Stadium; Attendance: 2,590; Referee: Shuhei Shimizu |

| 23 April 2023 11 | Thespakusatsu Gunma | 0–0 | Tokushima Vortis | Maebashi |
| 14:03 | | Report | Cacá (yellow card) 73'; Nishiya (yellow card) 90+4'; Abe (yellow card) 90+5' | Stadium: Shoda Shoyu Stadium Gunma; Attendance: 2,249; Referee: Hirokazu Otsubo |

| 29 April 2023 12 | Thespakusatsu Gunma | 2–1 | Ventforet Kofu | Maebashi |
| 14:03 | Nagakura 59'; Okamoto 76' | Report | Araki (yellow card) 31'; Mitsuhira 47'; Kobayashi (yellow card) 74'; Hayashida (yellow card) 87' | Stadium: Shoda Shoyu Stadium Gunma; Attendance: 4,371; Referee: Reo Tanaka |

| 3 May 2023 13 | Roasso Kumamoto | 2–0 | Thespakusatsu Gunma | Kumamoto |
| 13:53 | Kamimura (yellow card) 30'; Hirakawa 44'; Aihara 90+2' | Report | | Stadium: Egao Kenko Stadium; Attendance: 4,193; Referee: Hajime Matsuo |

| 7 May 2023 14 | Thespakusatsu Gunma | 2–1 | Renofa Yamaguchi | Maebashi |
| 14:03 | Kitagawa 15'; Take 76'; Sakai (yellow card) 90+3' | Report | Igarashi 61'; Yoshioka (yellow card) 82' | Stadium: Shoda Shoyu Stadium Gunma; Attendance: 1,719; Referee: Koei Koya |

| 13 May 2023 15 | Júbilo Iwata | 4–2 | Thespakusatsu Gunma | Iwata |
| 14:00 | Fujikawa 10'; Yamada 13'; Dudu Pacheco 47'; Germain 56'; Kanuma (yellow card) 86' | Report | Kazama 71'; Sakai 77' | Stadium: Yamaha Stadium; Attendance: 8,963; Referee: Yuzo Sutani |

| 17 May 2023 16 | Thespakusatsu Gunma | 2–1 | Mito HollyHock | Maebashi |
| 19:00 | Hiramatsu 64'; Kawakami 75' | Report | Umeda 6' | Stadium: Shoda Shoyu Stadium Gunma; Attendance: 2,090; Referee: Tetsuro Yoshida |

| 21 May 2023 17 | Fagiano Okayama | v | Thespakusatsu Gunma | Okayama |
| 19:00 | | Report | | Stadium: City Light Stadium |

| 28 May 2023 18 | Thespakusatsu Gunma | v | Fujieda MYFC | Maebashi |
| 14:00 | | Report | | Stadium: Shoda Shoyu Stadium Gunma |

| 3 June 2023 19 | Zweigen Kanazawa | v | Thespakusatsu Gunma | Kanazawa |
| 14:00 | | Report | | Stadium: Ishikawa Kanazawa Stadium |

| 11 June 2023 20 | Thespakusatsu Gunma | v | Oita Trinita | Maebashi |
| 18:00 | | Report | | Stadium: Shoda Shoyu Stadium Gunma |

| 18 June 2023 21 | Tokyo Verdy | v | Thespakusatsu Gunma | Tokyo |
| 18:00 | | Report | | Stadium: Ajinomoto Field Nishigaoka |

| 25 June 2023 22 | Thespakusatsu Gunma | v | Shimizu S-Pulse | Maebashi |
| 19:30 | | Report | | Stadium: Shoda Shoyu Stadium Gunma |

=== Emperor's Cup ===
| 7 June 2023 Second round | Tokyo Verdy | 2–1 | Thespakusatsu Gunma | Tokyo |
| 18:30 | Yamada 44'; Nakata 83' (o.g.) | Report | Nishitani 36' (o.g.) | Stadium: Ajinomoto Field Nishigaoka; Referee: Tatsuya Saka |
