= 2024 Thespa Gunma season =

Thespa Gunma
2024 season
- Manager: Akira Muto (from 8 May)
- Stadium: Shoda Shoyu Stadium Gunma
- J2 League: 19th
- Emperor's Cup: Second round
- Top goalscorer: League: All: Masashi Wada (2)

The 2024 season is the 30th season in the existence of Thespa Gunma. The club participates in the J2 League, the Emperor's Cup and the J.League Cup.

== Players ==
=== First-team squad ===
As of 13 August 2024.

Note: Flags indicate national team as defined under FIFA eligibility rules; some limited exceptions apply. Players may hold more than one non-FIFA nationality.

No.	Pos.	Nation	Player
3	DF	JPN	Ryuya Ohata
4	DF	JPN	Yuma Funabashi
5	MF	JPN	Chie Edoojon Kawakami
6	MF	JPN	Tatsuya Uchida
7	MF	JPN	Masashi Wada
8	FW	JPN	Yuya Takazawa
9	FW	JPN	Shuto Kitagawa
10	MF	JPN	Ryo Sato
11	FW	JPN	Ryuji Sugimoto
13	GK	JPN	Issei Kondo
14	FW	JPN	Riyo Kawamoto (on loan from Shimizu S-Pulse)
15	MF	JPN	Koki Kazama
17	MF	JPN	Atsuki Yamanaka
18	FW	JPN	Luna Iwamoto
19	FW	JPN	Sena Saito (on loan from Shimizu S-Pulse)
21	GK	JPN	Masatoshi Kushibiki
22	DF	JPN	Yuriya Takahashi

No.	Pos.	Nation	Player
23	FW	JPN	Shu Hiramatsu
24	DF	JPN	Shuichi Sakai
25	DF	JPN	Rikiru Nakano
27	MF	JPN	Ren Fujimura
28	MF	JPN	Ryonosuke Kabayama (on loan from Sagan Tosu)
29	DF	JPN	Ryota Tagashira
30	FW	JPN	Toranosuke Onoseki
32	FW	JPN	Atsushi Kawata
33	MF	JPN	Hajime Hosogai
35	MF	JPN	Taishi Tamashiro
36	DF	JPN	Daiki Nakashio
37	MF	JPN	Gijo Sehata (on loan from V-Varen Nagasaki)
39	GK	JPN	Kohei Maki
40	FW	JPN	Kosuke Sagawa (on loan from Tokyo Verdy)
42	GK	JPN	Ryo Ishii
44	MF	JPN	Taishi Semba (on loan from Sanfrecce Hiroshima)
50	DF	JPN	Kenta Kikuchi

=== Out on loan ===
Note: Flags indicate national team as defined under FIFA eligibility rules; some limited exceptions apply. Players may hold more than one non-FIFA nationality.

No.	Pos.	Nation	Player
—	MF	JPN	Yudai Nakata (on loan at Tiamo Hirakata)

== Transfers ==
=== In ===
Pos.	Player	Transferred from	Fee	Date	Source
MF	(Japan) Masashi Wada	(Japan) Iwate Grulla Morioka		8 January 2024	
MF	(Japan) Taishi Semba	(Japan) Sanfrecce Hiroshima	Loan	10 July 2024	
DF	(Japan) Tatsushi Koyanagi	(Japan) Blaublitz Akita	Loan	21 August 2024	

== Competitions ==
=== J2 League ===
==== League table ====
Pos	Team	Pld	W	D	L	GF	GA	GD	Pts	Promotion or relegation
16	Oita Trinita	38	10	13	15	33	47	−14	43	
17	Ehime FC	38	10	10	18	41	69	−28	40	
18	Tochigi SC (R)	38	7	13	18	33	57	−24	34	Relegation to the 2025 J3 League
19	Kagoshima United (R)	38	7	9	22	35	59	−24	30	Relegation to the 2025 J3 League
20	Thespa Gunma (R)	38	3	9	26	24	62	−38	18	Relegation to the 2025 J3 League

Source: Meiji Yasuda J2 League, J.League Data Site
Rules for classification: 1) Points; 2) Goal difference; 3) Goals scored; 4) Head-to-head points; 5) Head-to-head goal difference; 6) Head-to-head goal scored; 7) Fair-play points.
(R) Relegated

==== Results summary ====
Overall								Home						Away					
Pld	W	D	L	GF	GA	GD	Pts	W	D	L	GF	GA	GD	W	D	L	GF	GA	GD
30	3	8	19	20	45	−25	17	1	4	11	7	21	−14	2	4	8	13	24	−11

Last updated: 7 September 2024.

==== Results by round ====
Round	1	2	3	4	5	6	7	8	9
Ground	H	A	H	H	A	H	A	H	H
Result	D	D	L	L	L	L	W	L	D
Position	7	11	18	19	20	20	19	19	19

Updated to match(es) played on 7 September 2024. Source: Worldfootball
A = Away; H = Home; W = Win; D = Draw; L = Loss

==== Matches ====
25 February 2024 1	Thespa Gunma	1–1	Kagoshima United	Maebashi
14:00				Stadium: Shoda Shoyu Stadium Gunma

3 March 2024 2	Roasso Kumamoto	1–1	Thespa Gunma	Kumamoto
13:00				Stadium: Egao Kenko Stadium

10 March 2024 3	Thespa Gunma	1–3	JEF United Chiba	Maebashi
17:00				Stadium: Shoda Shoyu Stadium Gunma

16 March 2024 4	Thespa Gunma	0–1	Ehime FC	Maebashi
14:00				Stadium: Shoda Shoyu Stadium Gunma

20 March 2024 5	Yokohama FC	1–0	Thespa Gunma	Yokohama
14:00				Stadium: NHK Spring Mitsuzawa Football Stadium

24 March 2024 6	Thespa Gunma	1–2	Fagiano Okayama	Maebashi
17:00				Stadium: Shoda Shoyu Stadium Gunma

30 March 2024 7	Tokushima Vortis	0–1	Thespa Gunma	Naruto
14:00				Stadium: Pocarisweat Stadium

14 April 2024 10	Renofa Yamaguchi	4–0	Thespa Gunma	Yamaguchi
14:00				Stadium: Ishin Me-Life Stadium

20 April 2024 11	Ventforet Kofu	4–1	Thespa Gunma	Kōfu
14:00				Stadium: JIT Recycle Ink Stadium

27 April 2024 12	Thespa Gunma	1–2	V-Varen Nagasaki	Maebashi
14:00				Stadium: Shoda Shoyu Stadium Gunma

3 May 2024 13	Fujieda MYFC	2–1	Thespa Gunma	Fujieda
14:00				Stadium: Fujieda Soccer Stadium

6 May 2024 14	Thespa Gunma	0–3	Shimizu S-Pulse	Maebashi
14:00				Stadium: Shoda Shoyu Stadium Gunma

11 May 2024 15	Vegalta Sendai	2–1	Thespa Gunma	Sendai
14:00				Stadium: Yurtec Stadium Sendai

18 May 2024 16	Thespa Gunma	0–1	Iwaki FC	Maebashi
14:00				Stadium: Shoda Shoyu Stadium Gunma

26 May 2024 17	Blaublitz Akita	1–1	Thespa Gunma	Akita
14:00				Stadium: Soyu Stadium

2 June 2024 18	Thespa Gunma	0–0	Montedio Yamagata	Maebashi
14:00				Stadium: Shoda Shoyu Stadium Gunma

8 June 2024 19	Tochigi SC	1–1	Thespa Gunma	Utsunomiya
19:00				Stadium: Tochigi Green Stadium

16 June 2024 20	Thespa Gunma	0–1	Renofa Yamaguchi	Maebashi
18:30				Stadium: Shoda Shoyu Stadium Gunma

22 June 2024 21	Fagiano Okayama	1–0	Thespa Gunma	Okayama
19:00				Stadium: City Light Stadium

29 June 2024 22	Thespa Gunma	1–2	Fujieda MYFC	Maebashi
19:00				Stadium: Shoda Shoyu Stadium Gunma

7 July 2024 23	Ehime FC	0–4	Thespa Gunma	Matsuyama
19:00				Stadium: Ningineer Stadium

13 July 2024 24	Kagoshima United	1–1	Thespa Gunma	Kagoshima
19:00				Stadium: Shiranami Stadium

3 August 2024 25	Thespa Gunma	0–1	Ventforet Kofu	Maebashi
19:00				Stadium: Shoda Shoyu Stadium Gunma

10 August 2024 26	Shimizu S-Pulse	4–0	Thespa Gunma	Shimizu-ku
18:30				Stadium: IAI Stadium Nihondaira

17 August 2024 27	Thespa Gunma	1–2	Yokohama FC	Maebashi
19:00				Stadium: Shoda Shoyu Stadium Gunma

25 August 2024 28	Mito HollyHock	2–1	Thespa Gunma	Mito
18:00				Stadium: K's denki Stadium Mito

1 September 2024 29	Thespa Gunma	1–0	Blaublitz Akita	Maebashi
19:00	Riyo Kawamoto 74'			Stadium: Shoda Shoyu Stadium Gunma

7 September 2024 30	Thespa Gunma	0–0	Vegalta Sendai	Maebashi
19:00				Stadium: Shoda Shoyu Stadium Gunma

=== Emperor's Cup ===
12 June 2024 Second round	Thespa Gunma	1–1 (a.e.t.) (2–3 p)	Renofa Yamaguchi	Maebashi
19:00				Stadium: Shoda Shoyu Stadium Gunma

=== J.League Cup ===
6 March 2024 Round 1	Thespa Gunma	4–1 (a.e.t.)	SC Sagamihara	Maebashi
19:00				Stadium: Shoda Shoyu Stadium Gunma

24 April 2024 Round 2	Thespa Gunma	1–3	Kashiwa Reysol	Maebashi
19:00				Stadium: Shoda Shoyu Stadium Gunma
