= Hayate =

Hayate (write: 疾風 lit. "Hurricane") may refer to:

- Hayate (train), the name of a train service in Japan
- Nakajima Ki-84, a World War II era fighter
- Japanese destroyer Hayate, two destroyers built for the Imperial Japanese Navy
- Forward Racing formerly Hayate Racing Team, the Kawasaki team in the 2009 MotoGP season
- Hayate Inc., a Japanese entertainment company

== People with the given name ==
- Hayate Hachikubo (八久保 颯; born 1993), Japanese footballer
- Hayate Matsubara (松原 颯; born 2003), Japanese swimmer
- Hayate Matsuda (松田 隼風; born 2003), Japanese footballer
- Hayate Shirowa (城和 隼颯; born 1998), Japanese footballer
- Hayate Sugii (杉井 颯; born 2000), Japanese footballer
- Hayate Take (武 颯; born 1995), Japanese footballer
- Hayate Tsuta (蔦 颯; born 1995), Japanese footballer

=== Fictional characters ===
- Hayate Ayasaki, the main character in the anime series Hayate the Combat Butler
- Hayate (Dead or Alive), a fighter in the Dead or Alive video game series
- Hayate, a character in Street Fighter EX2
- Black Hayate, a dog in Fullmetal Alchemist
- Hayate Gekko, the examiner for the preliminaries of the Chuunin Exams in Naruto
- Hayate Kirino, a character in Igano Kabamaru
- Hayate Hisakawa, a character in the game The Idolmaster Cinderella Girls franchise
- Hayate Nakajima, a character from the second Strike Witches manga
- Hayate Yagami, a character in Magical Girl Lyrical Nanoha A's anime and its sequel
- Sho Hayate, the main character in the Fu'un video game series
- Hayate, a character in tokusatsu Seijuu Sentai Gingaman
- Hayate, lead male character in Prétear
- Hayate Immelmann, the protagonist in the anime series Macross Delta
- Hayate, an archer in the MOBA game Arena of Valor

== See also ==
- Hayate the Combat Butler, a Japanese manga series
- Hayate X Blade, a Japanese manga series
- Ninja Hayate, a 1984 laserdisc arcade game by Taito
- Hayate (Greek streamer)
