= Gotoda =

Gotoda (後藤田) is a Japanese surname. Notable people with the surname include:

- Koki Gotoda (後藤田 亘輝, born 1999), Japanese footballer
- Masaharu Gotoda (後藤田 正晴, 1914–2005), Japanese bureaucrat and politician
- Masazumi Gotoda (後藤田 正純, born 1969), Japanese politician
- Yuki Gotoda (後藤田 由紀, born 1970), Japanese actress known as Maki Mizuno
