= Ryosuke Maeda =

Ryosuke Maeda (Japanese: 前田 凌佑) may refer to:

- Ryosuke Maeda (footballer, born 1994), Japanese footballer
- Ryosuke Maeda (footballer, born 1998), Japanese footballer
