= 2013 Thespakusatsu Gunma season =

Thespakusatsu Gunma
2013 season
- Manager: Tadahiro Akiba
- Stadium: Shoda Shoyu Stadium Gunma
- J2 League: 20th

2013 Thespakusatsu Gunma season.

== J2 League ==
| Match | Date | Team | Score | Team | Venue | Attendance |
|---|---|---|---|---|---|---|
| 1 | 2013.03.03 | Mito HollyHock | 1-1 | Thespakusatsu Gunma | K's denki Stadium Mito | 5,537 |
| 2 | 2013.03.10 | Thespakusatsu Gunma | 0-0 | Gainare Tottori | Shoda Shoyu Stadium Gunma | 3,635 |
| 3 | 2013.03.17 | FC Gifu | 0-0 | Thespakusatsu Gunma | Gifu Nagaragawa Stadium | 2,510 |
| 4 | 2013.03.20 | Thespakusatsu Gunma | 1-0 | Yokohama FC | Shoda Shoyu Stadium Gunma | 3,190 |
| 5 | 2013.03.24 | Vissel Kobe | 4-1 | Thespakusatsu Gunma | Noevir Stadium Kobe | 6,594 |
| 6 | 2013.03.31 | Tochigi SC | 3-0 | Thespakusatsu Gunma | Tochigi Green Stadium | 3,030 |
| 7 | 2013.04.07 | Thespakusatsu Gunma | 0-2 | JEF United Chiba | Shoda Shoyu Stadium Gunma | 5,579 |
| 8 | 2013.04.14 | Ehime FC | 2-0 | Thespakusatsu Gunma | Ningineer Stadium | 2,124 |
| 9 | 2013.04.17 | Thespakusatsu Gunma | 0-1 | Avispa Fukuoka | Shoda Shoyu Stadium Gunma | 1,472 |
| 10 | 2013.04.21 | Fagiano Okayama | 2-0 | Thespakusatsu Gunma | Kanko Stadium | 6,983 |
| 11 | 2013.04.28 | Thespakusatsu Gunma | 4-1 | Tokushima Vortis | Shoda Shoyu Stadium Gunma | 2,542 |
| 12 | 2013.05.03 | Matsumoto Yamaga FC | 1-1 | Thespakusatsu Gunma | Matsumotodaira Park Stadium | 11,881 |
| 13 | 2013.05.06 | Thespakusatsu Gunma | 0-1 | Tokyo Verdy | Shoda Shoyu Stadium Gunma | 3,856 |
| 14 | 2013.05.12 | Kyoto Sanga FC | 2-1 | Thespakusatsu Gunma | Kyoto Nishikyogoku Athletic Stadium | 7,078 |
| 15 | 2013.05.19 | Gamba Osaka | 5-1 | Thespakusatsu Gunma | Expo '70 Commemorative Stadium | 8,045 |
| 16 | 2013.05.26 | Thespakusatsu Gunma | 0-0 | Giravanz Kitakyushu | Shoda Shoyu Stadium Gunma | 2,259 |
| 17 | 2013.06.01 | Thespakusatsu Gunma | 1-2 | V-Varen Nagasaki | Shoda Shoyu Stadium Gunma | 6,186 |
| 18 | 2013.06.08 | Kataller Toyama | 0-0 | Thespakusatsu Gunma | Toyama Stadium | 3,879 |
| 19 | 2013.06.15 | Thespakusatsu Gunma | 2-2 | Montedio Yamagata | Shoda Shoyu Stadium Gunma | 2,086 |
| 20 | 2013.06.22 | Roasso Kumamoto | 2-3 | Thespakusatsu Gunma | Umakana-Yokana Stadium | 5,966 |
| 21 | 2013.06.29 | Thespakusatsu Gunma | 2-0 | Consadole Sapporo | Shoda Shoyu Stadium Gunma | 2,723 |
| 22 | 2013.07.03 | Avispa Fukuoka | 1-0 | Thespakusatsu Gunma | Level5 Stadium | 2,640 |
| 23 | 2013.07.07 | Thespakusatsu Gunma | 0-1 | Mito HollyHock | Shoda Shoyu Stadium Gunma | 3,883 |
| 24 | 2013.07.14 | V-Varen Nagasaki | 1-0 | Thespakusatsu Gunma | Nagasaki Stadium | 3,981 |
| 25 | 2013.07.20 | Tokushima Vortis | 4-1 | Thespakusatsu Gunma | Pocarisweat Stadium | 4,664 |
| 26 | 2013.07.27 | Thespakusatsu Gunma | 1-1 | Kataller Toyama | Shoda Shoyu Stadium Gunma | 1,815 |
| 27 | 2013.08.04 | Thespakusatsu Gunma | 3-0 | Matsumoto Yamaga FC | Shoda Shoyu Stadium Gunma | 6,822 |
| 28 | 2013.08.11 | Montedio Yamagata | 1-1 | Thespakusatsu Gunma | ND Soft Stadium Yamagata | 7,032 |
| 29 | 2013.08.18 | Thespakusatsu Gunma | 1-0 | Roasso Kumamoto | Shoda Shoyu Stadium Gunma | 2,841 |
| 30 | 2013.08.21 | JEF United Chiba | 2-2 | Thespakusatsu Gunma | Fukuda Denshi Arena | 9,258 |
| 31 | 2013.08.25 | Thespakusatsu Gunma | 2-1 | Ehime FC | Shoda Shoyu Stadium Gunma | 2,496 |
| 32 | 2013.09.01 | Yokohama FC | 2-0 | Thespakusatsu Gunma | NHK Spring Mitsuzawa Football Stadium | 4,127 |
| 33 | 2013.09.15 | Thespakusatsu Gunma | 0-1 | FC Gifu | Shoda Shoyu Stadium Gunma | 2,310 |
| 34 | 2013.09.22 | Thespakusatsu Gunma | 0-1 | Tochigi SC | Shoda Shoyu Stadium Gunma | 3,706 |
| 35 | 2013.09.29 | Tokyo Verdy | 2-1 | Thespakusatsu Gunma | Tokyo National Stadium | 9,002 |
| 36 | 2013.10.06 | Consadole Sapporo | 1-3 | Thespakusatsu Gunma | Sapporo Atsubetsu Stadium | 6,396 |
| 37 | 2013.10.20 | Thespakusatsu Gunma | 2-3 | Kyoto Sanga FC | Shoda Shoyu Stadium Gunma | 2,781 |
| 38 | 2013.10.27 | Thespakusatsu Gunma | 2-1 | Fagiano Okayama | Shoda Shoyu Stadium Gunma | 2,763 |
| 39 | 2013.11.03 | Giravanz Kitakyushu | 3-2 | Thespakusatsu Gunma | Honjo Stadium | 1,682 |
| 40 | 2013.11.10 | Gainare Tottori | 1-1 | Thespakusatsu Gunma | Tottori Bank Bird Stadium | 2,222 |
| 41 | 2013.11.17 | Thespakusatsu Gunma | 2-2 | Vissel Kobe | Shoda Shoyu Stadium Gunma | 4,235 |
| 42 | 2013.11.24 | Thespakusatsu Gunma | 1-1 | Gamba Osaka | Shoda Shoyu Stadium Gunma | 7,810 |
