= Ryo Ishii =

Ryo Ishii is the name of:

- Ryo Ishii (footballer, born 1993), Japanese footballer
- Ryo Ishii (footballer, born 2000), Japanese footballer
