= Taiki Amagasa =

Japanese footballer (born 2000)

Taiki Amagasa 天笠 泰輝
Personal information
- Date of birth: 11 May 2000 (age 26)
- Place of birth: Gunma, Japan
- Height: 1.76 m (5 ft 9 in)
- Position: Midfielder

Team information
- Current team: JEF United Chiba
- Number: 32

Youth career
- Ota Minami FC
- 2013–2015: Maebashi FC
- 2016–2018: Aomori Yamada High School

College career
| Years | Team | Apps | (Gls) |
| 2019–2020 | Kansai University | | |

Senior career*
| Years | Team | Apps | (Gls) |
| 2020–2024 | Thespakusatsu Gunma | 99 | (3) |
| 2025 | Oita Trinita | 38 | (1) |
| 2026– | JEF United Chiba | 5 | (0) |
- * Club domestic league appearances and goals as of 21:54, 11 April 2026 (UTC)

Taiki Amagasa (天笠 泰輝, Amagasa Taiki; born 11 May 2000) is a Japanese footballer currently playing as a midfielder for J1 League club JEF United Chiba.

== Career ==
On 26 December 2024, Amagasa was announced at Oita Trinita.

After one season with Oita Trinta, in January 2026 Amagasa joined newly promoted J1 League club JEF United Chiba.

== Career statistics ==
=== Club ===
As of 11 April 2026.

Appearances and goals by club, season and competition
| Club | Season | League | | | National cup (Note: Includes Emperors Cup) | | League cup (Note: Includes J.League Cup) | | Total | |
| Club | Season | Division | Apps | Goals | Apps | Goals | Apps | Goals | Apps | Goals |
|---|---|---|---|---|---|---|---|---|---|---|
| Thespakusatsu Gunma | 2021 | J2 League | 2 | 0 | 1 | 0 | 0 | 0 | 3 | 0 |
| Thespakusatsu Gunma | 2022 | J2 League | 25 | 1 | 3 | 0 | 0 | 0 | 28 | 1 |
| Thespakusatsu Gunma | 2023 | J2 League | 40 | 1 | 0 | 0 | 0 | 0 | 40 | 1 |
| Thespakusatsu Gunma | 2024 | J2 League | 32 | 1 | 0 | 0 | 2 | 0 | 34 | 1 |
| Thespakusatsu Gunma | Total | | 99 | 3 | 4 | 0 | 2 | 0 | 105 | 3 |
| Oita Trinita | 2025 | J2 League | 38 | 1 | 3 | 0 | – | | 41 | 1 |
| JEF United Chiba | 2026 | J1 (100) | 5 | 0 | – | | – | | 5 | 0 |
| Career total | | | 142 | 4 | 7 | 0 | 2 | 0 | 151 | 4 |
