= Hayate Hachikubo =

Japanese footballer

Hayate Hachikubo 八久保颯
Personal information
- Full name: Hayate Hachikubo
- Date of birth: 23 June 1993 (age 33)
- Place of birth: Hitoyoshi, Kumamoto, Japan
- Height: 1.68 m (5 ft 6 in)
- Position: Midfielder

Team information
- Current team: Roasso Kumamoto
- Number: 19

Youth career
- 2012–2015: Hannan University

Senior career*
Years	Team	Apps	(Gls)
2016–2020	Roasso Kumamoto	73	(8)
2020–2021	Suzuka Point Getters		
- * Club domestic league appearances and goals as of 15:55, 21 January 2024

Hayate Hachikubo (八久保颯, Hachikubo, Hayate; born 23 June 1993 in Hitoyoshi, Kumamoto) is a Japanese former footballer who last played for Suzuka Point Getters.

== Career ==
Hayate made his debut for Roasso Kumamoto against Shimizu S-Pulse on the 10 July 2016. He scored his first goal for the club against Yokohama FC on the 16 July 2016, scoring in the 3rd minute.

== Club statistics ==
Updated to 23 February 2018.

Club performance			League		Cup		Total	
Season	Club	League	Apps	Goals	Apps	Goals	Apps	Goals
Japan			League		Emperor's Cup		Total	
2016	Roasso Kumamoto	J2 League	10	1	0	0	10	1
2017	Roasso Kumamoto	J2 League	21	3	1	0	22	3
Career total			31	4	1	0	32	4
