= Japanese destroyer Hayate =

Two Japanese destroyers have been named Hayate :

- Japanese destroyer Hayate (1906), a Kamikaze-class destroyer launched in 1906 and scrapped in 1924
- Japanese destroyer Hayate (1925), a Kamikaze-class destroyer launched in 1925 and sunk in 1941
