= Hayate (Greek streamer) =

Michalis "Hayate" Zannis
- Born: 1989 (age 36–37); Greece
- Other names: Perfect Balance, Archigos ("Leader")
- Citizenship: Greece
- Occupations: Youtuber, Streamer, Influencer, Gamer.

Michalis Zannis (born 1989), known online as Hayate, also known as Archigos ("Leader") and Perfect Balance, is a Greek streamer, gamer and influencer mostly known for his controversial and sometimes violent streams.

== Early life ==
Michalis was born to Greek parents from Northern Epirus in 1989.

== Early career ==
Michalis started streaming League of Legends on Twitch, becoming famous for his antics, breaking stuff and shouting while playing.

After an altercation between him and his then-girlfriend he was banned from the Platform.

== Hayate Army ==
After his Twitch ban, Michalis started streaming again on YouTube. There, he created a live show where he brought in various guests and engaged in numerous controversial activities. Some of the guests (who were usually mentally ill) earned a semi-permanent spot in his streams. These streams eventually came to be called the "Hayate Army," where Michalis was the "Leader."

While the streams were always controversial, until 2024 they never drew any significant attention from authorities. On 3/2/2024 he was arrested on charges of human trafficking and bodily harm to disabled people.

== Imprisonment ==
While he denied the charges Michalis was imprisoned for 14 months until he was proven innocent in court, on 30 March 2025.

== Later career ==
As of 2025, Michalis has started streaming again on TikTok by himself, sometimes collabing with past "Hayate Army" members.

== Controversies and Legal Issues ==
Parapolitika and other Greek media sources report that Michalis "Hayate" Zannis has been involved in several serious accusations and criminal complaints relating to his behavior online as well as how he has handled vulnerable people.

Human trafficking charges

According to publications, Zannis was criminally charged with human trafficking by occupation and by encumbrance.

Exploitation of vulnerable persons

It was reported that Zannis exploited and abused people with disabilities as well as other vulnerable individuals who appeared on his livestreams and videos. In a few instances, people with mental disabilities were supposedly forced to do something on camera for the streamer's and viewer's advantage.

Live broadcasts of abusive acts

Media reports say that Zannis in live broadcasts exhibited brutal behavior and made participants go through a series of "ordeals," many a time on the demand of paying audiences.

Allegations of physical violence

His recording participants also alleged they were attacked with punches, slaps, as well as being spat on during or as a part of his recording.

Sexual misconduct allegations

Some newspapers have also implicated Zannis in cases of a sexual nature against minor girls between the ages of 15 and 18, with no less than one complainant claiming that he was a participant in these episodes.
