= Yuki Kusano =

Japanese footballer (born 1996)

Personal information
- Date of birth: 21 July 1996 (age 30)
- Place of birth: Hokkaido, Japan
- Height: 1.69 m (5 ft 7 in)
- Position: Forward

Youth career
- 2003–2004: Yanagimachi SSS
- 2005–2008: Progresso Tokachi
- 2009–2014: JFA Academy Fukushima

College career
Years	Team	Apps	(Gls)
2015–2018	Hannan University		

Senior career*
Years	Team	Apps	(Gls)
2019–2020	Yokohama FC	23	(5)
2021	Renofa Yamaguchi	30	(5)
2022	FC Ryukyu	22	(7)
2023–2025	Mito HollyHock	57	(7)
2025	→ Renofa Yamaguchi (loan)	5	(0)
2026	Nakhon Ratchasima	11	(3)
- * Club domestic league appearances and goals as of 23 January 2026

Yuki Kusano (草野 侑己, Kusano Yūki; born 21 July 1996) is a Japanese professional footballer who plays as a forward for Nakhon Ratchasima in the Thai League 1.

== Career ==
Kusano made his debut for Yokohama against Kagoshima United on 18 May 2019. He scored his first goal for the club on 22 June 2019 against Mito HollyHock, scoring in the 32nd minute.

Kusano made his debut for Renofa against Matsumoto Yamaga on 28 February 2021. He scored his first goal for the club against Ryukyu on 6 March 2021, scoring in the 58th minute.

Kusano made his debut for Ryukyu against Machida Zelvia on 20 February 2022. He scored his first goal for the club against Mito Hollyhock on 19 March 2022, scoring in the 30th minute.

Kusano made his debut for Mito against Ventforet Kofu on 26 March 2023. He scored his first goal for the club against Vegalta Sendai, scoring in the 50th minute.

== Honours ==
Yokohama FC

- J2 League (2019) (runners-up)
