= Hayate Matsuda =

Japanese footballer (born 2003)

Hayate Matsuda 松田 隼風
Personal information
- Full name: Hayate Matsuda
- Date of birth: 2 October 2003 (age 23)
- Place of birth: Hokkaido, Japan
- Height: 1.73 m (5 ft 8 in)
- Position: Left-back

Team information
- Current team: Hannover 96
- Number: 27

Youth career
- Hakodate Junior FC
- Playful Hakodate FC
- –2021: JFA Academy Fukushima

Senior career*
| Years | Team | Apps | (Gls) |
| 2021–2025 | Mito HollyHock | 20 | (1) |
| 2023–2025 | → Hannover 96 II (loan) | 60 | (3) |
| 2025– | Hannover 96 | 25 | (3) |

International career^{‡}
| 2019 | Japan U16 | | |
| 2020 | Japan U17 | | |
| 2022– | Japan U19 | 4 | (0) |
| 2023– | Japan U20 | 6 | (0) |
- * Club domestic league appearances and goals as of 18 May 2026 ‡ National team caps and goals as of 27 May 2024

Hayate Matsuda (松田 隼風, Matsuda Hayate; born 2 October 2003) is a Japanese footballer who plays as a left-back for 2. Bundesliga club Hannover 96.

== Club career ==
In September 2021, Matsuda was announced as a designated special player for J2 League side Mito HollyHock.

On 8 June 2023, Matsuda was announced at Hannover 96 II on loan. He transferred to Hannover permanently ahead of the 2025–26 season and was promoted to the first team after having trained with them occasionally during the previous season.

== International career ==
In April 2022, Matsuda was called up to the Japan national under-19 football team for the first time.

Matsuda was called up to the Japan U-20 squad for the 2023 FIFA U-20 World Cup.

== Career statistics ==
=== Club ===
As of 1 July 2025

Appearances and goals by club, season and competition
| Club | Season | League | | | National cup | | League cup | | Other | | Total | |
| Club | Season | Division | Apps | Goals | Apps | Goals | Apps | Goals | Apps | Goals | Apps | Goals |
|---|---|---|---|---|---|---|---|---|---|---|---|---|
| Mito HollyHock | 2021 | J2 League | 0 | 0 | 0 | 0 | — | | — | | 0 | 0 |
| Mito HollyHock | 2022 | J2 League | 12 | 0 | 0 | 0 | — | | — | | 12 | 0 |
| Mito HollyHock | 2023 | J2 League | 8 | 1 | 0 | 0 | — | | — | | 8 | 1 |
| Mito HollyHock | Total | | 20 | 1 | 0 | 0 | 0 | 0 | 0 | 0 | 20 | 1 |
| Hannover 96 II (loan) | 2023–24 | Regionalliga Nord | 26 | 2 | — | | — | | 2 (Note: Appearances in 3. Liga promotion play-offs) | 1 | 28 | 3 |
| Hannover 96 II (loan) | 2024–25 | 3. Liga | 34 | 1 | — | | — | | — | | 34 | 1 |
| Hannover 96 II (loan) | Total | | 60 | 3 | 0 | 0 | 0 | 0 | 2 | 1 | 62 | 4 |
| Hannover 96 | 2025–26 | 2. Bundesliga | 0 | 0 | 0 | 0 | — | | — | | 0 | 0 |
| Career total | | | 80 | 4 | 0 | 0 | 0 | 0 | 2 | 1 | 82 | 5 |
