= Hayate Tsuta =

Japanese footballer

Personal information
- Date of birth: 7 June 1995 (age 31)
- Place of birth: Kanagawa, Japan
- Height: 1.82 m (6 ft 0 in)
- Position: Goalkeeper

Youth career
- Fujisawa FC
- SCH FC
- Maebashi Ikuei HS
- Senshu University

Senior career*
Years	Team	Apps	(Gls)
2018	Artista Asama	0	(0)
2019–2020	Thespakusatsu Gunma	0	(0)
2021–2023	Vanraure Hachinohe	32	(0)
- * Club domestic league appearances and goals as of 14 November 2024

Hayate Tsuta (蔦 颯, Tsuta Hayate; born 7 June 1995) is a Japanese footballer who last played as a goalkeeper for Vanraure Hachinohe.

== Career statistics ==
=== Club ===
As of 26 April 2021.

Club	Season	League			National Cup		League Cup		Other		Total	
Club	Season	Division	Apps	Goals	Apps	Goals	Apps	Goals	Apps	Goals	Apps	Goals
Artista Asama	2018	Hokushinetsu Football League	0	0	0	0	–		0	0	0	0
Thespakusatsu Gunma	2019	J3 League	0	0	0	0	–		0	0	0	0
Thespakusatsu Gunma	2020	J2 League	0	0	0	0	–		0	0	0	0
Thespakusatsu Gunma	Total		0	0	0	0	0	0	0	0	0	0
Vanraure Hachinohe	2021	J3 League	1	0	0	0	–		0	0	1	0
Career total			1	0	0	0	0	0	0	0	1	0
