= Takaya Kuroishi =

Japanese footballer

Personal information
- Date of birth: 24 February 1997 (age 29)
- Place of birth: Hyogo, Japan
- Height: 1.83 m (6 ft 0 in)
- Position: Forward

Team information
- Current team: Ehime FC
- Number: 5

Youth career
- –2011: Vissel Kobe
- 2012–2014: Kobe IU St. Michael's High School

College career
Years	Team	Apps	(Gls)
2015–2018	Himeji Dokkyo University		

Senior career*
Years	Team	Apps	(Gls)
2019	MIO Biwako Shiga	21	(1)
2020–2021	Vanraure Hachinohe	45	(3)
2021–2024	Mito HollyHock	48	(0)
2024	AC Nagano Parceiro (loan)	30	(4)
2025–	Ehime FC	47	(1)
- * Club domestic league appearances and goals as of 17 August 2026

Takaya Kuroishi (黒石 貴哉, Kuroishi Takaya; born 24 February 1997) is a Japanese footballer currently playing as a forward for Ehime FC.

== Career statistics ==
=== Club ===
As of 10 November 2020.

Club	Season	League			National Cup		League Cup		Other		Total	
Club	Season	Division	Apps	Goals	Apps	Goals	Apps	Goals	Apps	Goals	Apps	Goals
MIO Biwako Shiga	2019	JFL	21	1	1 (Note: Appearance(s) in Emperor's Cup)	0	–		0	0	22	1
Vanraure Hachinohe	2020	J3 League	23	2	0	0	–		0	0	23	2
Career total			44	3	1	0	0	0	0	0	45	3
