= Reo Yasunaga =

Japanese professional footballer

Personal information
- Full name: Reo Yasunaga
- Date of birth: 19 November 2000 (age 25)
- Place of birth: Tokyo, Japan
- Height: 1.77 m (5 ft 10 in)
- Position: Midfielder

Team information
- Current team: Matsumoto Yamaga FC
- Number: 46

Youth career
- 2009–2012: Yahata FC
- 2013–2015: Kawasaki Frontale
- 2016–2018: Yokohama FC

Senior career*
| Years | Team | Apps | (Gls) |
| 2018–2022 | Yokohama FC | 60 | (2) |
| 2019 | → Kataller Toyama (loan) | 2 | (0) |
| 2022–2023 | → Mito HollyHock (loan) | 23 | (0) |
| 2023– | Matsumoto Yamaga FC | 106 | (5) |
| Total | | 191 | (7) |
- * Club domestic league appearances and goals as of 24 August 2026

Reo Yasunaga (安永 玲央, Yasunaga Reo; born 19 November 2000) is a Japanese professional footballer who plays as a midfielder for Matsumoto Yamaga FC.

== Career ==
His father Sotaro is a former professional footballer, and a former manager of J3 League side SC Sagamihara.
