= Nao Yamada =

Japanese footballer

Personal information
- Date of birth: 18 November 2002 (age 23)
- Place of birth: Saitama, Japan
- Height: 1.83 m (6 ft 0 in)
- Position: Defender

Team information
- Current team: Tokushima Vortis
- Number: 3

Youth career
- Tsurugashima Nishi SSS
- Sakado Diplomats FC
- Urawa Reds

Senior career*
| Years | Team | Apps | (Gls) |
| 2021–2024 | Mito HollyHock | 76 | (1) |
| 2025– | Tokushima Vortis | 55 | (1) |

International career^{‡}
| 2018 | Japan U16 | | |
| 2019 | Japan U17 | | |
- * Club domestic league appearances and goals as of 14 August 2026 ‡ National team caps and goals as of 17:04, 9 June 2021 (UTC)

Nao Yamada (山田 奈央, Yamada Nao; born 18 November 2002) is a Japanese footballer currently playing as a defender for Tokushima Vortis.

== Club career ==
Yamada made his professional debut in a 0–3 Emperor's Cup loss against Thespakusatsu Gunma.

On 12 December 2024, Yamada joined Tokushima Vortis.

== Career statistics ==
=== Club ===
As of 9 August 2022.

Appearances and goals by club, season and competition
| Club | Season | League | | | Emperor's Cup | | J. League Cup | | Other | | Total | |
| Club | Season | Division | Apps | Goals | Apps | Goals | Apps | Goals | Apps | Goals | Apps | Goals |
|---|---|---|---|---|---|---|---|---|---|---|---|---|
| Mito HollyHock | 2021 | J2 League | 1 | 0 | 1 | 0 | 0 | 0 | 0 | 0 | 2 | 0 |
| Mito HollyHock | 2022 | J2 League | 12 | 0 | 1 | 0 | 0 | 0 | 0 | 0 | 13 | 0 |
| Career total | | | 13 | 0 | 2 | 0 | 0 | 0 | 0 | 0 | 14 | 0 |

== Honours ==
Japan U16

- AFC U-16 Championship: 2018
