= Kaito Hirata =

Japanese footballer

Kaito Hirata 平田 海斗
Personal information
- Date of birth: 25 July 2001 (age 25)
- Place of birth: Fujioka, Gunma, Japan
- Height: 1.70 m (5 ft 7 in)
- Position: Midfielder

Team information
- Current team: Bokelj
- Number: 11

Youth career
- Fujioka Daini SC
- Takasaki FC
- –2020: Mito HollyHock

Senior career*
Years	Team	Apps	(Gls)
2020–2022	Mito HollyHock	2	(0)
2021–2022	→ ReinMeer Aomori (loan)	9	(1)
2023–2025	ReinMeer Aomori	34	(2)
2025–	Bokelj	10	(0)
- * Club domestic league appearances and goals as of 1 June 2025

Kaito Hirata (平田 海斗, Hirata Kaito; born 25 July 2001) is a Japanese footballer currently playing as a midfielder for Bokelj in Montenegro.

== Career ==
Hirata began his professional career with Mito HollyHock after promotion to its top team ahead of the 2020 season.

Hirata was transferred to ReinMeer Aomori for the 2023 season, after spending the previous two seasons with the club as a loanee.

== Career statistics ==
=== Club ===
As of the start from 2023 season.

Club	Season	League			National Cup		League Cup		Other		Total	
Club	Season	Division	Apps	Goals	Apps	Goals	Apps	Goals	Apps	Goals	Apps	Goals
Mito HollyHock	2020	J2 League	2	0	0	0	0	0	0	0	2	0
Mito HollyHock	2021	J2 League	0	0	0	0	0	0	0	0	0	0
ReinMeer Aomori (loan)	2021	Japan Football League	7	0	0	0	0	0	0	0	7	0
ReinMeer Aomori (loan)	2022	Japan Football League	2	1	0	0	0	0	0	0	2	1
ReinMeer Aomori	2023	Japan Football League	0	0	0	0	0	0	0	0	0	0
Career total			11	1	0	0	0	0	0	0	11	1
