= Shuichi Sakai =

Japanese footballer

Personal information
- Date of birth: 13 May 1996 (age 30)
- Place of birth: Nagasu, Kumamoto, Japan
- Height: 1.84 m (6 ft 0 in)
- Position: Defender

Team information
- Current team: AC Nagano Parceiro
- Number: 2

Youth career
- Kumamoto United SC
- –2011: UKI.C.FC
- 2012–2014: Kyoto Sanga

College career
Years	Team	Apps	(Gls)
2015–2018	Tokai University Kumamoto		

Senior career*
Years	Team	Apps	(Gls)
2019–2023	Roasso Kumamoto	22	(1)
2023–2024	Thespa Gunma	62	(1)
2025	Kataller Toyama	11	(0)
2025	→ AC Nagano Parceiro (loan)	12	(0)
2026–	AC Nagano Parceiro	7	(0)
- * Club domestic league appearances and goals as of 17 August 2026

Shuichi Sakai (酒井 崇一, Sakai Shuichi; born 13 May 1996) is a Japanese footballer currently playing as a defender for AC Nagano Parceiro.

== Career statistics ==
=== Club ===
As of 13 November 2020.

Club	Season	League			National Cup		League Cup		Other		Total	
Club	Season	Division	Apps	Goals	Apps	Goals	Apps	Goals	Apps	Goals	Apps	Goals
Roasso Kumamoto	2019	J3 League	6	0	0	0	–		0	0	6	0
Roasso Kumamoto	2019	J3 League	16	1	0	0	–		0	0	16	1
Career total			22	1	0	0	0	0	0	0	22	1
