= Ryo Sato (footballer) =

Japanese footballer

Ryo Sato 佐藤 亮
Personal information
- Full name: Ryo Sato
- Date of birth: 24 November 1997 (age 28)
- Place of birth: Kita, Tokyo, Japan
- Height: 1.70 m (5 ft 7 in)
- Position: Forward

Team information
- Current team: Matsumoto Yamaga FC
- Number: 18

Youth career
- –2016: FC Tokyo

College career
Years	Team	Apps	(Gls)
2016–2019	Meiji University		

Senior career*
Years	Team	Apps	(Gls)
2020–2022	Giravanz Kitakyushu	87	(15)
2023–2024	Thespa Gunma	45	(9)
2025–	Ehime FC	34	(5)
2026–	→ Matsumoto Yamaga FC (loan)	0	(0)
- * Club domestic league appearances and goals as of 14 August 2026

Ryo Sato (佐藤 亮, Satō Ryō; born 24 November 1997) is a Japanese footballer currently playing as a forward for Matsumoto Yamaga FC, on loan from Tegevajaro Miyazaki.

== Career statistics ==
=== Club ===
As of 1 January 2021.

Club	Season	League			National Cup		League Cup		Total	
Club	Season	Division	Apps	Goals	Apps	Goals	Apps	Goals	Apps	Goals
Meiji University	2019	–			2 (Note: Appearances in the Emperor's Cup)	1	0	0	2	1
Giravanz Kitakyushu	2020	J2 League	26	3	0	0	–		26	3
Career total			26	3	2	1	–		28	4
