= Takumi Kusumoto =

Japanese footballer

Takumi Kusumoto 楠本 卓海
Personal information
- Full name: Takumi Kusumoto
- Date of birth: December 10, 1995 (age 30)
- Place of birth: Tokyo, Japan
- Height: 1.82 m (5 ft 11 1/2 in)
- Position: Defender

Team information
- Current team: Fujieda MYFC
- Number: 5

Youth career
- 2014–2017: Tokyo International University

Senior career*
Years	Team	Apps	(Gls)
2018–2021	Renofa Yamaguchi FC	66	(2)
2022–2024	Mito HollyHock	71	(5)
2025–	Fujieda MYFC	41	(3)
- * Club domestic league appearances and goals as of 13 August 2026

Takumi Kusumoto (楠本 卓海, Kusumoto Takumi; born December 10, 1995) is a Japanese professional footballer who plays as a defender for Fujieda MYFC.

== Career ==
After graduating from Tokyo International University, he joined J2 League club Renofa Yamaguchi FC on 13 December 2017.

On 18 December 2021, Kusumoto was announced at Mito Hollyhock.

On 11 December 2024, Kusumoto was announced at Fujieda MYFC.
