= Yutaka Soneda =

Japanese footballer

Yutaka Soneda 曽根田 穣
Personal information
- Full name: Yutaka Soneda
- Date of birth: August 29, 1994 (age 32)
- Place of birth: Ehime, Japan
- Height: 1.71 m (5 ft 7 1/2 in)
- Position: Midfielder

Team information
- Current team: Ehime FC
- Number: 7

Youth career
- 2010–2012: Ehime FC

College career
Years	Team	Apps	(Gls)
2013–2016	Biwako Seikei Sport College		

Senior career*
Years	Team	Apps	(Gls)
2017–2019	Ventforet Kofu	54	(10)
2020–2021	Kyoto Sanga	37	(3)
2022	Mito HollyHock	27	(5)
2023–	Ehime FC	72	(7)
- * Club domestic league appearances and goals as of 1 January 2026

Yutaka Soneda (曽根田 穣, Soneda Yutaka; born August 29, 1994) is a Japanese football player who currently plays for Ehime FC.

== Career ==
Yutaka Soneda joined J1 League club Ventforet Kofu in 2017.

== Career statistics ==
Updated to end of 2018 season.

Appearances and goals by club, season and competition
Club	Season	League			Emperor's Cup		J.League Cup		Total	
Club	Season	Division	Apps	Goals	Apps	Goals	Apps	Goals	Apps	Goals
Ventforet Kofu	2017	J1 League	3	0	1	0	6	0	10	0
Ventforet Kofu	2018	J2 League	20	4	4	2	9	2	33	8
Career total			23	4	5	2	15	2	43	8
