= Yuriya Takahashi =

Japanese footballer

Yuriya Takahashi 高橋 勇利也
Personal information
- Full name: Yuriya Takahashi
- Date of birth: 24 March 1999 (age 27)
- Place of birth: Miyazaki, Japan
- Height: 1.81 m (5 ft 11 in)
- Position: Defender

Team information
- Current team: Iwaki FC
- Number: 22

Youth career
- –2010: Ijima SSS
- 2011–2013: Fagiano Okayama
- 2014–2016: Tohoku High School

College career
Years	Team	Apps	(Gls)
2017–2020	Kanagawa University		

Senior career*
Years	Team	Apps	(Gls)
2021–2025	Thespa Gunma	72	(9)
2026–	Iwaki FC	17	(2)
- * Club domestic league appearances and goals as of 14 August 2026

Yuriya Takahashi (高橋 勇利也, Takahashi Yuriya; born 24 March 1999) is a Japanese professional footballer who plays as a defender for J2 League club Iwaki FC.

His father Norio is a former professional footballer.

== Early life ==
Yuriya was born in Miyazaki. Before turning professional, he played in his youth for Ishima SSS, Fagiano Okayama, Tohoku High School and Kanagawa University.

== Career ==
Yuriya made his debut for Thespa against Mito HollyHock on the 4 June 2021. He scored his first goal for the club on the 5 July 2023, scoring against Roasso Kumamoto in the 29th minute.

== Career statistics ==
=== Club ===
As of 29 April 2026.

Appearances and goals by club, season and competition
Club	Season	League			National cup (Note: Includes Emperors Cup)		League cup (Note: Includes J.League Cup)		Total	
Club	Season	Division	Apps	Goals	Apps	Goals	Apps	Goals	Apps	Goals
Thespa Gunma	2021	J2 League	9	0	3	1	0	0	12	1
Thespa Gunma	2022	J2 League	4	0	3	0	0	0	7	0
Thespa Gunma	2023	J2 League	6	2	1	0	0	0	7	2
Thespa Gunma	2024	J2 League	23	1	1	0	1	0	25	1
Thespa Gunma	2025	J3 League	30	6	2	0	1	0	33	6
Thespa Gunma	Total		72	9	10	1	2	0	84	10
Iwaki FC	2026	J2/J3 (100)	11	1	–		–		11	1
Career total			83	10	10	1	2	0	95	11
