= Hayate Shirowa =

Japanese footballer

Personal information
- Date of birth: 25 August 1998 (age 28)
- Place of birth: Chiba, Japan
- Height: 1.87 m (6 ft 2 in)
- Position: Defender

Team information
- Current team: Montedio Yamagata
- Number: 22

Youth career
- FC Yawata Beavers
- –2016: Kashiwa Reysol

College career
Years	Team	Apps	(Gls)
2017–2020	Hosei University		

Senior career*
Years	Team	Apps	(Gls)
2021–2024	Thespa Gunma	95	(1)
2024–	Montedio Yamagata	40	(1)
- * Club domestic league appearances and goals as of 13 August 2026

Hayate Shirowa (城和 隼颯, Shirowa Hayate; born 25 August 1998) is a Japanese professional footballer who plays as a defender for club Montedio Yamagata.

== Career statistics ==
=== Club ===
As of 27 February 2021.

Club	Season	League			National Cup		League Cup		Other		Total	
Club	Season	Division	Apps	Goals	Apps	Goals	Apps	Goals	Apps	Goals	Apps	Goals
Thespakusatsu Gunma	2021	J2 League	1	0	0	0	0	0	0	0	1	0
Career total			1	0	0	0	0	0	0	0	1	0
