= Koki Kazama =

Japanese footballer (born 1991)

Koki Kazama 風間 宏希
Personal information
- Full name: Koki Kazama
- Date of birth: 19 June 1991 (age 35)
- Place of birth: Fuchū, Hiroshima, Japan
- Height: 1.77 m (5 ft 9 1/2 in)
- Position: Midfielder

Team information
- Current team: Thespa Gunma
- Number: 15

Youth career
- 2004–2006: Shimizu FC
- 2007–2009: Shimizu Shogyo High School

Senior career*
Years	Team	Apps	(Gls)
2010–2011	Louletano	5	(0)
2011–2012	TuS Koblenz	10	(0)
2012–2013	Kawasaki Frontale	17	(0)
2014–2016	Giravanz Kitakyushu	122	(12)
2017–2018	Montedio Yamagata	21	(0)
2018	→ Thespakusatsu Gunma (loan)	31	(7)
2019–2021	FC Ryukyu	113	(6)
2022–	Thespa Gunma (Note: Thespakusastsu Gunma change name to Thespa Gunma from 2024 season)	119	(5)
- * Club domestic league appearances and goals as of 25 August 2026

Koki Kazama (風間 宏希, Kazama Kōki; born 19 June 1991) is a Japanese football player who play as a Central Midfielder and currently play for J3 League club, Thespa Gunma.

He comes from a footballing family. His younger brother Koya is also a professional footballer currently playing for J1 League club, JEF United Chiba. His father Yahiro is a former professional footballer and currently manager of Kantō Division 1 club, Nankatsu SC.

== Career ==
In 2022, Koki return to Thespakusastsu Gunma since 2018 as loan transfer.

== Career statistics ==
As of the start for 2025 season.

Appearances and goals by club, season and competition
Club	Season	League			Emperor's Cup		J.League Cup		Total	
Club	Season	Division	Apps	Goals	Apps	Goals	Apps	Goals	Apps	Goals
2010–11	Louletano DC	Segunda Divisão	5	0	-		-		5	0
2011–12	TuS Koblenz	Regionalliga	10	0	-		-		10	0
2012	Kawasaki Frontale	J.League Div 1	16	0	3	0	-		19	0
2013	Kawasaki Frontale	J.League Div 1	1	0	1	0	1	0	3	0
2014	Giravanz Kitakyushu	J.League Div 2	38	6	4	0	-		42	6
2015	Giravanz Kitakyushu	J2 League	42	2	2	0	-		44	2
2016	Giravanz Kitakyushu	J2 League	42	4	0	0	-		42	4
2017	Montedio Yamagata	J2 League	21	0	2	0	-		23	0
2018	Thespakusatsu Gunma (loan)	J3 League	31	7	0	0	-		31	7
2019	FC Ryukyu	J2 League	42	2	1	0	-		43	2
2020	FC Ryukyu	J2 League	31	2	-				31	2
2021	FC Ryukyu	J2 League	40	2	0	0	-		40	2
2022	Thespakusatsu Gunma	J2 League	30	0	1	0	-		31	0
2023	Thespakusatsu Gunma	J2 League	42	3	1	0	-		43	3
2024	Thespa Gunma	J2 League	30	0	0	0	0	0	30	0
2025	Thespa Gunma	J3 League	0	0	0	0	0	0	0	0
Career total			421	28	15	0	1	0	437	28
