= Koshi Osaki =

Japanese footballer

Personal information
- Date of birth: 30 June 1998 (age 28)
- Place of birth: Osaka, Japan
- Height: 1.76 m (5 ft 9 in)
- Position: Defender

Team information
- Current team: Mito HollyHock
- Number: 3

Youth career
- Stay Cool FC
- –2013: Osaka Central FC
- 2014–2016: Tokai Univ. Gyosei High School

College career
Years	Team	Apps	(Gls)
2017–2020	Osaka University of H&SS		

Senior career*
Years	Team	Apps	(Gls)
2021–	Mito HollyHock	157	(9)
- * Club domestic league appearances and goals as of 12 August 2026

Koshi Osaki (大崎 航詩, Osaki Koshi; born 30 June 1998) is a Japanese footballer currently playing as a defender for Mito HollyHock.

== Career ==
On 23 December 2020, it was announced that Osaki would join the first team from the 2021 season.

== Career statistics ==
=== Club ===
As of 20 March 2026.

Appearances and goals by club, season and competition
Club	Season	League			National cup (Note: Includes Emperors Cup)		League cup (Note: Includes J.League Cup)		Total	
Club	Season	Division	Apps	Goals	Apps	Goals	Apps	Goals	Apps	Goals
Mito Hollyhock	2021	J2 League	29	3	0	0	0	0	29	3
Mito Hollyhock	2022	J2 League	31	0	1	0	0	0	32	0
Mito Hollyhock	2023	J2 League	18	1	0	0	0	0	18	1
Mito Hollyhock	2024	J2 League	30	3	1	0	0	0	31	3
Mito Hollyhock	2025	J2 League	31	2	1	0	1	0	33	2
Mito Hollyhock	2026	J1 (100)	7	0	0	0	0	0	7	0
Career total			146	9	3	0	1	0	150	9
