= Shuto Kitagawa =

Japanese footballer

Shuto Kitagawa 北川柊斗
Personal information
- Full name: Shuto Kitagawa
- Date of birth: June 1, 1995 (age 31)
- Place of birth: Mie, Japan
- Height: 1.80 m (5 ft 11 in)
- Position: Forward

Team information
- Current team: Thespakusatsu Gunma

Youth career
- Nagoya Grampus
- 2014–2017: University of Tsukuba

Senior career*
Years	Team	Apps	(Gls)
2018–2020	Montedio Yamagata	40	(3)
2019	→ Giravanz Kitakyushu (loan)	11	(7)
2021–	Thespakusatsu Gunma	0	(0)
- * Club domestic league appearances and goals as of 14:56, 3 January 2021 (UTC)

Shuto Kitagawa (北川柊斗, Kitagawa Shuto; born June 1, 1995) is a Japanese football player for Thespakusatsu Gunma.

== Career ==
After attending University of Tsukuba, Kitagawa joined Montedio Yamagata in January 2018.

== Club statistics ==
Updated to end of 2018 season.

Club performance			League		Cup		Total	
Season	Club	League	Apps	Goals	Apps	Goals	Apps	Goals
Japan			League		Emperor's Cup		Total	
2018	Montedio Yamagata	J2 League	17	1	4	0	21	1
Total			17	1	4	0	21	1
