= Koichi Murata =

Japanese professional footballer

Koichi Murata 村田 航一
Personal information
- Date of birth: 6 September 1996 (age 30)
- Place of birth: Miyazaki, Japan
- Height: 1.78 m (5 ft 10 in)
- Position: Defender

Team information
- Current team: Zweigen Kanazawa
- Number: 6

Youth career
- –2008: Arriba FC
- 2009–2011: Nissho Gakuen Junior High School
- 2012–2014: Nissho Gakuen High School

College career
Years	Team	Apps	(Gls)
2015–2018	Meiji University		

Senior career*
Years	Team	Apps	(Gls)
2019–2025	Mito HollyHock	130	(7)
2026–	Zweigen Kanazawa	6	(1)
- * Club domestic league appearances and goals as of 11:04, 27 May 2026 (UTC)

Koichi Murata (村田 航一, Murata Kōichi; born 6 September 1996) is a Japanese professional footballer who plays as a defender for J3 League club Zweigen Kanazawa.

== Career ==
Ahead of the 2024 season, Murata was named captain of Mito HollyHock.

In December 2025, it was announced Murata would be joining J3 League club Zweigen Kanazawa.

== Career statistics ==
As of 27 May 2026.

Appearances and goals by club, season and competition
Club	Season	League			National cup (Note: Includes Emperor Cup)		League cup (Note: Includes J.League Cup)		Total	
Club	Season	Division	Apps	Goals	Apps	Goals	Apps	Goals	Apps	Goals
Mito HollyHock	2019	J2 League	30	2	0	0	0	0	30	2
Mito HollyHock	2020	J2 League	16	2	0	0	0	0	16	2
Mito HollyHock	2021	J2 League	31	0	1	0	0	0	32	0
Mito HollyHock	2022	J2 League	17	1	0	0	0	0	17	1
Mito HollyHock	2023	J2 League	22	1	1	0	0	0	23	1
Mito HollyHock	2024	J2 League	11	0	0	0	0	0	11	0
Mito HollyHock	2025	J2 League	3	1	0	0	1	0	4	1
Mito HollyHock	Total		130	7	2	0	1	0	133	7
Zweigen Kanazawa	2026	J2/J3 (100)	6	1	–		–		6	1
Career total			136	8	2	0	1	0	139	8
