= Riyo Kawamoto =

Japanese footballer

Riyo Kawamoto 川本 梨誉
Personal information
- Full name: Riyo Kawamoto
- Date of birth: 11 June 2001 (age 25)
- Place of birth: Shizuoka, Shizuoka, Japan
- Height: 1.78 m (5 ft 10 in)
- Positions: Forward; winger

Team information
- Current team: FC Gifu
- Number: 17

Youth career
- Nakada FC
- Shimizu S-Pulse

Senior career*
Years	Team	Apps	(Gls)
2019–	Shimizu S-Pulse	8	(1)
2021–2022	→ Fagiano Okayama (loan)	51	(4)
2022-2024	→ Thespakusatsu Gunma (loan)	65	(7)
2025	→ Blaublitz Akita (loan)	3	(0)
2025	→ FC Gifu (loan)	17	(3)
2026–	FC Gifu	8	(7)

International career
2017	Japan U16	5	(0)
2019	Japan U18	3	(0)
- * Club domestic league appearances and goals as of 22:04, 29 March 2026 (UTC)

Riyo Kawamoto (川本 梨誉, Kawamoto Riyo; born 11 June 2001) is a Japanese footballer currently playing as a forward or a winger for J3 League club FC Gifu.

== Early life ==
Kawamoto was born in Shizuoka. He played youth football for Shimizu S-Pulse.

== Career ==
Kawamoto made his debut for Shimizu against Urawa Red Diamonds on 6 October 2019. He scored his first goal for the club against Gamba Osaka on 19 December 2020, scoring in the 49th minute.

Kawamoto made his debut for Fagiano Okayama on 28 February 2021. He scored his first goal for the club on 5 May 2021, scoring in the 27th minute.

Kawamoto made his debut for Thespa against Vegalta Sendai on 20 August 2022. He scored his first goal for the club against Tokyo Verdy on 10 September 2022, scoring in the 54th minute.

== International career ==
Kawamoto has caps at youth level for the Japan national team.

== Career statistics ==
=== Club ===
As of 29 March 2026.

Appearances and goals by club, season and competition
Club	Season	League			National cup (Note: Includes Emperors Cup)		League cup (Note: Includes J.League Cup)		Total	
Club	Season	Division	Apps	Goals	Apps	Goals	Apps	Goals	Apps	Goals
Shimizu S-Pulse	2019	J1 League	2	0	2	0	1	0	5	0
Shimizu S-Pulse	2020	J1 League	6	1	0	0	2	0	8	1
Shimizu S-Pulse	2024	J2 League	0	0	0	0	1	0	1	0
Shimizu S-Pulse	Total		8	1	2	0	4	0	14	1
Fagiano Okayama (loan)	2021	J2 League	30	2	1	0	–		31	2
Fagiano Okayama (loan)	2022	J2 League	21	2	1	0	–		22	2
Fagiano Okayama (loan)	Total		51	4	2	0	0	0	53	4
Thespa Gunma (loan)	2022	J2 League	10	1	0	0	–		10	1
Thespa Gunma (loan)	2023	J2 League	34	3	1	0	–		35	3
Thespa Gunma (loan)	2024	J2 League	21	3	0	0	–		21	3
Thespa Gunma (loan)	Total		65	7	1	0	0	0	66	7
Blaublitz Akita (loan)	2025	J2 League	3	0	1	0	1	0	5	0
FC Gifu (loan)	2025	J3 League	17	3	–		–		17	3
FC Gifu	2026	J2/J3 (100)	8	7	–		–		8	7
Career total			152	22	6	0	5	0	163	22
