= Fumiya Unoki =

Japanese footballer

Fumiya Unoki 鵜木 郁哉
Personal information
- Date of birth: 4 July 2001 (age 25)
- Place of birth: Chiba, Japan
- Height: 1.67 m (5 ft 6 in)
- Position: Winger

Team information
- Current team: Vanraure Hachinohe
- Number: 6

Youth career
- FC Sakura
- –2019: Kashiwa Reysol

Senior career*
Years	Team	Apps	(Gls)
2019–2026	Kashiwa Reysol	18	(0)
2022–2023	→ Mito Hollyhock (loan)	35	(5)
2025	→ Iwaki FC (loan)	16	(1)
2026–	Vanraure Hachinohe	13	(1)
- * Club domestic league appearances and goals as of 13 August 2026

Fumiya Unoki (鵜木 郁哉, Unoki Fumiya; born 4 July 2001) is a Japanese footballer who plays as a winger or forward for J2 League club Vanraure Hachinohe.

== Career statistics ==
=== Club ===
As of 28 February 2023.

Appearances and goals by club, season and competition
Club	Season	League			National Cup		League Cup		Other		Total	
Club	Season	Division	Apps	Goals	Apps	Goals	Apps	Goals	Apps	Goals	Apps	Goals
Japan			League		Emperor's Cup		J.League Cup		Other		Total	
Kashiwa Reysol	2019	J2 League	0	0	0	0	1	0	–		1	0
Kashiwa Reysol	2020	J1 League	4	0	0	0	2	0	–		6	0
Kashiwa Reysol	2021	J1 League	2	0	0	0	1	0	–		3	0
Kashiwa Reysol	2022	J1 League	4	0	1	0	4	1	–		9	1
Kashiwa Reysol	Total		10	0	1	0	8	1	0	0	19	1
Mito Hollyhock (loan)	2022	J2 League	8	0	0	0	–		–		8	0
Mito Hollyhock (loan)	2023	J2 League	1	0	0	0	–		–		1	0
Mito Hollyhock (loan)	Total		9	0	0	0	0	0	0	0	9	0
Career total			19	0	1	0	8	1	0	0	28	1
