= Ryo Niizato =

Japanese footballer

Personal information
- Date of birth: 3 September 1995 (age 31)
- Place of birth: Tokyo, Japan
- Height: 1.81 m (5 ft 11 in)
- Position: Midfielder

Team information
- Current team: Iwate Grulla Morioka
- Number: 17

Youth career
- Juntendo University

Senior career*
| Years | Team | Apps | (Gls) |
| 2018–2020 | V-Varen Nagasaki | 27 | (0) |
| 2021–2023 | Mito HollyHock | 89 | (6) |
| 2024– | Iwate Grulla Morioka | 0 | (0) |
- * Club domestic league appearances and goals as of 9 August 2022

Ryo Niizato (新里 涼, Niizato Ryō; born 3 September 1995) is a Japanese professional footballer who plays as a midfielder for Iwate Grulla Morioka.

== Personal life ==
On February 13, 2023, he married former AKB48 member and freelance announcer Kobayashi Marina.
