= Atsuki Yamanaka =

Japanese footballer

Personal information
- Date of birth: 6 May 2001 (age 25)
- Place of birth: Kitamoto, Saitama, Japan
- Height: 1.73 m (5 ft 8 in)
- Position: Midfielder

Team information
- Current team: Iwaki FC
- Number: 27

Youth career
- Konan Minami SSS
- –2016: Grande FC
- 2017–2019: Urawa Reds

Senior career*
| Years | Team | Apps | (Gls) |
| 2020–2024 | Thespakusatsu Gunma | 105 | (3) |
| 2021 | → Nagano Parceiro (loan) | 1 | (0) |
| 2025– | Iwaki FC | 33 | (6) |
- * Club domestic league appearances and goals as of 14 August 2026

Atsuki Yamanaka (山中 惇希, Yamanaka Atsuki; born 6 May 2001) is a Japanese footballer currently playing as a midfielder for Iwaki FC.

== Career statistics ==
=== Club ===
As of 27 October 2021.

| Club | Season | League | | | National Cup | | League Cup | | Other | | Total | |
| Club | Season | Division | Apps | Goals | Apps | Goals | Apps | Goals | Apps | Goals | Apps | Goals |
|---|---|---|---|---|---|---|---|---|---|---|---|---|
| Thespakusatsu Gunma | 2021 | J2 League | 0 | 0 | 0 | 0 | – | | 0 | 0 | 0 | 0 |
| Nagano Parceiro (loan) | 2021 | J3 League | 1 | 0 | 0 | 0 | – | | 0 | 0 | 1 | 0 |
| Career total | | | 1 | 0 | 0 | 0 | 0 | 0 | 0 | 0 | 1 | 0 |
