= Daiki Nakashio =

Japanese footballer

Daiki Nakashio 中塩 大貴
Personal information
- Date of birth: 8 June 1997 (age 29)
- Place of birth: Saitama, Japan
- Height: 1.81 m (5 ft 11 in)
- Position: Defender

Team information
- Current team: SC Sagamihara
- Number: 36

Youth career
- Kaji SSS
- –2012: Konan Minami SS
- 2013–2015: Urawa Red Diamonds

College career
Years	Team	Apps	(Gls)
2016–2019	Rissho University		

Senior career*
Years	Team	Apps	(Gls)
2019–2021	Ventforet Kofu	22	(0)
2021-2022	Yokohama FC	15	(0)
2022	→ Giravanz Kitakyushu (loan)	8	(0)
2023–2024	Thespa Gunma (Note: Thespakusatsu Gunma changed its name to Thespa Gunma for 2024 season)	69	(3)
2025–	SC Sagamihara	9	(0)
- * Club domestic league appearances and goals as of 17 January 2026

Daiki Nakashio (中塩 大貴, Nakashio Daiki; born 8 June 1997) is a Japanese footballer who plays as a defender and currently play for J3 League club, SC Sagamihara.

== Career ==
On 3 January 2025, Nakashio was announced as an official transfer to J3 club, SC Sagamihara for 2025 season.

== Career statistics ==
=== Club ===
As of the start for 2025 season.

Club	Season	League			National Cup		League Cup		Continental		Other		Total	
Club	Season	Division	Apps	Goals	Apps	Goals	Apps	Goals	Apps	Goals	Apps	Goals	Apps	Goals
Ventforet Kofu	2020	J2 League	22	0	0	0	0	0	0	0	0	0	22	0
Yokohama FC	2021	J1 League	5	0	1	0	4	0	0	0	0	0	10	0
Yokohama FC	2022	J2 League	10	0	2	0	0	0	0	0	0	0	12	0
Giravanz Kitakyushu (loan)	2022	J3 League	8	0	0	0	0	0	0	0	0	0	8	0
Thespakusatsu Gunma	2023	J2 League	42	3	0	0	0	0	0	0	0	0	42	3
Thespa Gunma	2024	J2 League	27	0	0	0	0	0	0	0	0	0	27	0
SC Sagamihara	2025	J3 League	0	0	0	0	0	0	0	0	0	0	0	0
Career total			114	3	3	0	4	0	0	0	0	0	121	3
