= Shoma Otoizumi =

Japanese footballer

Shoma Otoizumi 音泉 翔眞
Personal information
- Full name: Shoma Otoizumi
- Date of birth: 7 July 1996 (age 30)
- Place of birth: Chiba, Japan
- Height: 1.74 m (5 ft 9 in)
- Position: Forward

Team information
- Current team: Vanraure Hachinohe
- Number: 18

Youth career
- –2008: Tokagi SSC
- 2009–2011: Vivaio Funabashi
- 2012–2014: Kanto Daiichi High School

College career
Years	Team	Apps	(Gls)
2015–2018	Tokyo International University		

Senior career*
Years	Team	Apps	(Gls)
2019	Tokyo 23	12	(2)
2020	YSCC Yokohama	24	(2)
2021	Kataller Toyama	28	(3)
2022–2023	Mito HollyHock	2	(0)
2023	→ Nagano Parceiro (loan)	32	(1)
2024–	Vanraure Hachinohe	91	(5)
- * Club domestic league appearances and goals as of 13 August 2026

Shoma Otoizumi (音泉 翔眞, Otoizumi Shoma; born 7 July 1996) is a Japanese footballer currently playing as a forward for Vanraure Hachinohe.

== Career statistics ==
=== Club ===
Updated to the end 2022 season.

Club	Season	League			National Cup		League Cup		Other		Total	
Club	Season	Division	Apps	Goals	Apps	Goals	Apps	Goals	Apps	Goals	Apps	Goals
Tokyo 23	2019	JRL (Kantō, Div. 1)	12	2	0	0	–		0	0	12	2
YSCC Yokohama	2020	J3 League	32	2	0	0	–		0	0	32	2
Kataller Toyama	2021	J3 League	28	3	2	1	–		0	0	30	4
Mito HollyHock	2022	J2 League	2	0	0	0	–		0	0	2	0
Nagano Parceiro (loan)	2023	J3 League	0	0	0	0	–		0	0	0	0
Career total			74	7	2	1	0	0	0	0	76	8
