= Koki Gotoda =

Japanese footballer

Personal information
- Date of birth: 15 May 1999 (age 27)
- Place of birth: Kanagawa, Japan
- Height: 1.76 m (5 ft 9 in)
- Position: Defender

Team information
- Current team: FC Ryukyu
- Number: 37

Youth career
- Buddy SC
- –2014: Yokohama F. Marinos
- 2015–2017: Maebashi Ikuei High School

College career
Years	Team	Apps	(Gls)
2018–2021	Aoyama Gakuin University		

Senior career*
Years	Team	Apps	(Gls)
2021–2024	Mito HollyHock	37	(0)
2025–	FC Ryukyu	3	(0)
- * Club domestic league appearances and goals as of 1 January 2026

Koki Gotoda (後藤田 亘輝, Gotoda Koki; born 15 May 1999) is a Japanese footballer currently playing as a defender for FC Ryukyu.

== Career ==
On 29 April 2021, Gotoda was registered as a designated player for the 2021 season, with him joining the team properly from the 2022 season. On 16 November 2024, the club announced it would not be renewing his contract for the 2025 season.

On 5 January 2025, Gotoda joined FC Ryukyu.

== Career statistics ==
=== Club ===
As of 9 July 2021.

Club	Season	League			National Cup		League Cup		Other		Total	
Club	Season	Division	Apps	Goals	Apps	Goals	Apps	Goals	Apps	Goals	Apps	Goals
Mito HollyHock	2021	J2 League	3	0	0	0	0	0	0	0	3	0
Career total			3	0	0	0	0	0	0	0	3	0
