= Ryosuke Maeda (footballer, born 1998) =

Japanese football player (born 1998)

Personal information
- Full name: Ryosuke Maeda
- Date of birth: March 2, 1998 (age 28)
- Place of birth: Miyazaki, Japan
- Height: 1.70 m (5 ft 7 in)
- Position: Midfielder

Team information
- Current team: Albirex Niigata
- Number: 70

Youth career
- 2013–2015: Miyazaki Nihon University High School

College career
| Years | Team | Apps | (Gls) |
| 2016–2019 | Miyazaki Sangyo-keiei University | | |

Senior career*
| Years | Team | Apps | (Gls) |
| 2020 | Fukushima United FC | 20 | (0) |
| 2021–2022 | Tegevajaro Miyazaki | 27 | (4) |
| 2022–2026 | Mito HollyHock | 111 | (1) |
| 2025–2026 | → Ehime FC (loan) | 32 | (2) |
| 2026– | Albirex Niigata | 1 | (0) |
- * Club domestic league appearances and goals as of 16 August 2026

Ryosuke Maeda (前田 椋介, Maeda Ryosuke; born March 2, 1998) is a Japanese professional footballer who plays as a midfielder for Albirex Niigata.

== Career statistics ==
As of 24/02/22

Appearances and goals by club, season and competition
| Club | Season | League | | | National Cup | | League Cup | | Other | | Total | |
| Club | Season | Division | Apps | Goals | Apps | Goals | Apps | Goals | Apps | Goals | Apps | Goals |
|---|---|---|---|---|---|---|---|---|---|---|---|---|
| Fukushima United FC | 2020 | J3 League | 20 | 0 | – | | – | | – | | 20 | 0 |
| Tegevajaro Miyazaki | 2021 | J3 League | 27 | 4 | | | | | | | 27 | 4 |
| Career total | | | 20 | 0 | 0 | 0 | 0 | 0 | 0 | 0 | 20 | 0 |
