= Kaito Umeda =

Japanese footballer

Personal information
- Date of birth: 15 May 1997 (age 29)
- Place of birth: Yamaguchi, Japan
- Height: 1.77 m (5 ft 10 in)
- Position: Forward

Team information
- Current team: Blaublitz Akita
- Number: 8

Youth career
- FC Ausutoruno
- 2010–2012: Takagawa Gakuen Junior High School
- 2013–2015: Takagawa Gakuen High School

College career
Years	Team	Apps	(Gls)
2016–2019	Fukuoka University		

Senior career*
Years	Team	Apps	(Gls)
2020–2021	Tegevajaro Miyazaki	42	(12)
2022–2025	Mito HollyHock	65	(6)
2026–	Blaublitz Akita	17	(3)
- * Club domestic league appearances and goals as of 14 August 2026

Kaito Umeda (梅田 魁人, Umeda Keito; born 15 May 1997) is a Japanese footballer currently playing as a forward for Blaublitz Akita.

== Career statistics ==
=== Club ===
As of 9 August 2022.

Club	Season	League			National Cup		League Cup		Other		Total	
Club	Season	Division	Apps	Goals	Apps	Goals	Apps	Goals	Apps	Goals	Apps	Goals
Fukuoka University	2018	–			2 (Note: Appearances in the Emperor's Cup)	0	–		0	0	2	0
Tegevajaro Miyazaki	2020	JFL	15	3	1	2	–		0	0	16	5
Tegevajaro Miyazaki	2021	J3 League	27	9	0	0	–		0	0	27	9
Tegevajaro Miyazaki	Total		42	12	1	2	0	0	0	0	43	14
Mito HollyHock	2022	J2 League	26	3	1	0	–		0	0	27	3
Career total			68	15	4	2	0	0	0	0	72	17
