= Chie Edoojon Kawakami =

Japanese footballer

Chie Edoojon Kawakami 川上 エドオジョン 智慧
Personal information
- Full name: Chie Edoojon Kawakami
- Date of birth: April 21, 1998 (age 28)
- Place of birth: Saitama, Japan
- Height: 1.67 m (5 ft 5 1/2 in)
- Position: Midfielder

Team information
- Current team: Blaublitz Akita (on loan from Fujieda MYFC)
- Number: 29

Youth career
- Nishiageo Kickers
- –2016: Urawa Red Diamonds

Senior career*
| Years | Team | Apps | (Gls) |
| 2017–2023 | Tokushima Vortis | 18 | (0) |
| 2018 | → Kataller Toyama (loan) | 24 | (0) |
| 2019 | → SC Sagamihara (loan) | 21 | (0) |
| 2023–2025 | Thespa Gunma | 59 | (5) |
| 2025– | Fujieda MYFC | 33 | (2) |
| 2026– | → Blaublitz Akita (loan) | 1 | (0) |
- * Club domestic league appearances and goals as of 23:01, 5 November 2026 (UTC)

Chie Edoojon Kawakami (川上 エドオジョン 智慧, Kawakami Edoojon Chie; born April 21, 1998) is a Japanese professional footballer who plays as a midfielder for J2 League club Blaublitz Akita, on loan from Fujieda MYFC.

== Career ==
Chie Edoojon Kawakami joined J2 League club Tokushima Vortis in 2017.

== Club statistics ==
As of 5 November 2026.

Appearances and goals by club, season and competition
| Club | Season | League | | | National cup (Note: Includes Emperor's Cup) | | League cup (Note: Includes J.League Cup) | | Total | |
| Club | Season | Division | Apps | Goals | Apps | Goals | Apps | Goals | Apps | Goals |
|---|---|---|---|---|---|---|---|---|---|---|
| Tokushima Vortis | 2017 | J2 League | 2 | 0 | 0 | 0 | 0 | 0 | 2 | 0 |
| Tokushima Vortis | 2020 | J2 League | 0 | 0 | 0 | 0 | 0 | 0 | 0 | 0 |
| Tokushima Vortis | 2021 | J1 League | 5 | 0 | 0 | 0 | 1 | 0 | 6 | 0 |
| Tokushima Vortis | 2022 | J2 League | 11 | 0 | 2 | 0 | 6 | 0 | 19 | 0 |
| Tokushima Vortis | Total | | 18 | 0 | 2 | 0 | 7 | 0 | 27 | 0 |
| Kataller Toyama (loan) | 2018 | J3 League | 24 | 0 | 1 | 0 | – | | 25 | 0 |
| SC Sagamihara (loan) | 2019 | J3 League | 21 | 0 | 0 | 0 | – | | 21 | 0 |
| Thespa Gunma | 2023 | J2 League | 27 | 2 | 0 | 0 | – | | 27 | 2 |
| Thespa Gunma | 2024 | J2 League | 32 | 3 | 1 | 0 | 0 | 0 | 33 | 3 |
| Thespa Gunma | Total | | 59 | 5 | 1 | 0 | 0 | 0 | 60 | 5 |
| Fujieda MYFC | 2025 | J2 League | 32 | 2 | 1 | 0 | 0 | 0 | 33 | 2 |
| Fujieda MYFC | 2026 | J2/J3 (100) | 1 | 0 | – | | – | | 1 | 0 |
| Fujieda MYFC | Total | | 33 | 2 | 1 | 0 | 0 | 0 | 34 | 2 |
| Blaublitz Akita (loan) | 2026–27 | J2 League | 1 | 0 | 0 | 0 | 0 | 0 | 1 | 0 |
| Career total | | | 156 | 7 | 5 | 0 | 7 | 0 | 168 | 7 |
