= Ryo Ishii (footballer, born 2000) =

Japanese footballer

Ryo Ishii 石井 僚
Personal information
- Date of birth: 11 July 2000 (age 26)
- Place of birth: Takasaki, Gunma, Japan
- Height: 1.91 m (6 ft 3 in)
- Position: Goalkeeper

Team information
- Current team: Yokohama FC
- Number: 42

Youth career
- Takasaki Kita SC
- Joshu FC Takasaki
- 2016–2021: Urawa Reds

Senior career*
Years	Team	Apps	(Gls)
2021–2022	Urawa Reds	0	(0)
2021	→ Renofa Yamaguchi (loan)	0	(0)
2021–2022	→ YSCC Yokohama (loan)	17	(0)
2023–2025	Thespa Gunma	5	(0)
2025–	Yokohama FC	4	(0)

International career
2018	Japan U18	1	(0)
- * Club domestic league appearances and goals as of 13:43, 8 April 2026 (UTC)

Ryo Ishii (石井 僚, Ishii Ryo; born 11 July 2000) is a Japanese footballer currently playing as a goalkeeper for J2 League club Yokohama FC.

== Career statistics ==
=== Club ===
As of 8 April 2026.

Appearances and goals by club, season and competition
Club	Season	League			National cup (Note: Includes Emperors Cup)		League cup (Note: Includes J.League Cup)		Total	
Club	Season	Division	Apps	Goals	Apps	Goals	Apps	Goals	Apps	Goals
Urawa Reds	2019	J1 League	0	0	0	0	–		0	0
Urawa Reds	2020	J1 League	0	0	0	0	–		0	0
Urawa Reds	Total		0	0	0	0	0	0	0	0
Renofa Yamaguchi (loan)	2021	J2 League	0	0	0	0	–		0	0
YSCC Yokohama (loan)	2021	J3 League	3	0	–		–		3	0
YSCC Yokohama (loan)	2022	J3 League	14	0	–		–		14	0
YSCC Yokohama (loan)	Total		17	0	0	0	0	0	17	0
Thespa Gunma	2023	J2 League	0	0	1	0	0	0	1	0
Thespa Gunma	2024	J2 League	5	0	1	0	2	0	8	0
Thespa Gunma	2025	J3 League	0	0	0	0	0	0	0	0
Thespa Gunma	Total		5	0	2	0	2	0	9	0
Yokohama FC	2025	J1 League	0	0	1	0	1	0	2	0
Yokohama FC	2026	J2/J3 (100)	4	0	0	0	0	0	4	0
Yokohama FC	Total		4	0	1	0	1	0	6	0
Career total			26	0	3	0	3	0	32	0
