= Shu Hiramatsu =

Japanese footballer (born 1992)

Shu Hiramatsu 平松 宗
Personal information
- Full name: Shu Hiramatsu
- Date of birth: 20 November 1992 (age 33)
- Place of birth: Niigata City, Japan
- Height: 1.84 m (6 ft 0 in)
- Position: Forward

Team information
- Current team: Thespakusatsu Gunma
- Number: 23

Youth career
- 2005–2010: Albirex Niigata
- 2011–2014: Kokushikan University

Senior career*
Years	Team	Apps	(Gls)
2015–2019	Albirex Niigata	24	(0)
2016	→ Mito HollyHock (loan)	22	(4)
2017–2018	→ V-Varen Nagasaki (loan)	25	(4)
2019	→ Kataller Toyama (loan)	15	(7)
2020	Kataller Toyama	29	(9)
2021–2022	SC Sagamihara	39	(5)
2022–	Thespakusatsu Gunma	37	(8)
- * Club domestic league appearances and goals as of 20:42, 18 August 2024 (UTC)

Shu Hiramatsu (平松 宗, Hiramatsu Shū; born 20 November 1992) is a Japanese football player who currently plays for Thespakusatsu Gunma.

== Career ==
=== Albirex Niigata ===
Born in Niigata City, Hiramatsu started his career with his hometown club Albirex Niigata, joining the club at the age of 12. He progressed through the youth system at the club and signed his first professional contract in 2014. He made his professional debut starting on 7 March 2015 in a 2-1 J1 League match loss to Sagan Tosu. Hiramatsu scored his first goal against Matsumoto Yamaga on 3 June 2015 in the J.League Cup, scoring in the 79th minute.

=== Loan to Mito HollyHock ===
On 6 July 2016, Hiramatsu was announced at Mito Hollyhock. He made his league debut against JEF United on 10 July 2016. Hiramatsu scored his first league goal against Zweigen Kanazawa on 31 July 2016, scoring in the 63rd minute.

=== Loan to V-Varen Nagasaki ===
On 12 August 2017, Hiramatsu was announced at V-Varen Nagasaki. He scored on his league debut against Tokyo Verdy on 20 August 2017, scoring in the 54th minute.

=== Loan to Kataller Toyama ===
On 7 August 2019, Hiramatsu was announced at Kataller Toyama. He made his league debut against Blaublitz Akita on 11 August 2019. Hiramatsu scored his first league goals against Kamatamare Sanuki on 7 September 2019, scoring a brace in the 17th and 77th minute.

=== Kataller Toyama ===
Hiramatsu made his league debut against Nagano Parceiro on 28 June 2020. He scored his first league goals against Sagamihara on 10 August 2020, scoring in the 8th and 83rd minute.

=== SC Sagamihara ===
On 1 June 2021, Hiramatsu was announced at SC Sagamihara.

=== Thespa Gunma ===
Hiramatsu made his league debut against Montedio Yamagata on 19 February 2022.

== Career statistics ==
Updated to 23 February 2020.

Appearances and goals by club, season and competition
Club	Season	League			Emperor's Cup		J.League Cup		Total	
Club	Season	Division	Apps	Goals	Apps	Goals	Apps	Goals	Apps	Goals
Albirex Niigata	2015	J1 League	13	0	2	0	6	1	21	1
Albirex Niigata	2016	J1 League	7	0	–		4	0	11	0
Mito HollyHock	2016	J2 League	22	4	0	0	–		22	4
Albirex Niigata	2017	J1 League	2	0	1	1	6	0	9	1
V-Varen Nagasaki	2017	J2 League	12	3	–		–		12	3
V-Varen Nagasaki	2018	J1 League	13	1	2	1	5	0	20	2
Albirex Niigata	2019	J2 League	2	0	0	0	–		2	0
Kataller Toyama	2019	J3 League	17	7	–		–		17	7
Career total			88	16	5	2	21	1	114	18
