= Shoda Shoyu Stadium Gunma =

Stadium in Maebashi, Japan

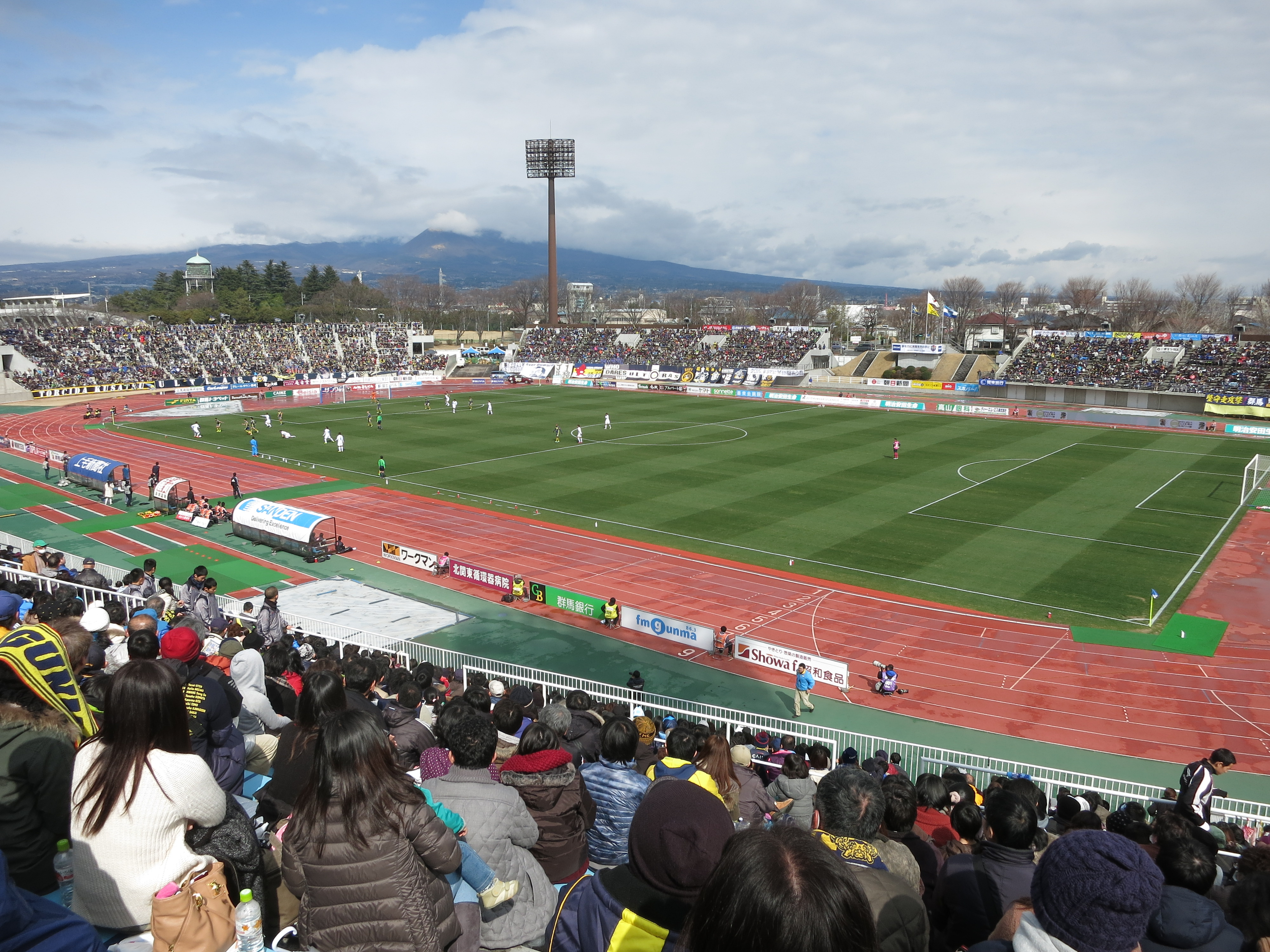

- Japan Gunma Prefecture
- Interactive map of Shoda Shoyu Stadium Gunma
- Former names: Gunma Shikishima Athletic Stadium (1951–2008)
- Location: Maebashi, Gunma, Japan
- Coordinates: 36.411613°N 139.053258°E
- Owner: Gunma Prefecture
- Operator: Shikishima Park Management JV
- Capacity: 15,253
- Scoreboard: Sony 785
- Public transit: JR East: Ryomo Line at Maebashi
- Parking: 1,200 spaces

Construction
- Opened: 1951
- Renovated: 2006, 2014

Tenant
- Thespa Gunma

Shoda Shoyu Stadium Gunma (正田醤油スタジアム群馬) (formerly Gunma Shikishima Athletic Stadium, renamed on June 1, 2008 for naming rights) is a multi-purpose stadium in Maebashi, Japan. It is currently used mostly for football matches. Sponsored by soy sauce maker Shoda Shoyu, which has its headquarters in nearby Tatebayashi, the stadium serves as a home ground of Thespa Gunma. The stadium has a capacity of 15,253.
