= 2026–27 Vissel Kobe season =

Vissel Kobe
2026–27 season
- Chairman: Yuki Chifu
- Manager: Michael Skibbe
- Stadium: Noevir Stadium Kobe; Hyōgo-ku, Kōbe, Hyōgo
Home colours	Away colours

The 2026–27 Vissel Kobe season is their 61st season in existence. They will also play in the 2026–27 AFC Champions League Elite after winning the J1 Centennial League.

== Squad ==
=== Season squad ===
Squad no.	Name	Nationality	Date of birth	Last Club
Goalkeepers
1	Daiya Maekawa	(Japan)	9 August 1994 (age 32)	(Japan) Kansai University
21	Shota Arai	(Japan)	1 November 1988 (age 38)	(Japan) JEF United Chiba
32	Richard Monday Ubong	(Japan) (Nigeria)	1 October 2005 (age 21)	(Japan) Fukuchiyama Seibi High School
39	Shioki Takayama	(Japan)	13 June 2001 (age 25)	(Japan) FC Ryukyu
71	Shūichi Gonda	(Japan)	3 March 1989 (age 37)	(Hungary) Debreceni
Defenders
3	Matheus Thuler	(Brazil)	10 March 1999 (age 27)	(France) Montpellier HSC
4	Tetsushi Yamakawa	(Japan)	1 October 1997 (age 29)	(Japan) University of Tsukuba
15	Diego	(Brazil)	21 September 1995 (age 31)	(Japan) Kashiwa Reysol
16	Caetano	(Brazil)	24 June 1999 (age 27)	(Brazil) Corinthians
24	Gōtoku Sakai	(Japan) (United States)	14 March 1991 (age 35)	(Germany) Hamburger SV
31	Takuya Iwanami	(Japan)	18 June 1994 (age 32)	(Japan) Urawa Red Diamonds
41	Katsuya Nagato	(Japan)	15 January 1995 (age 31)	(Japan) Yokohama F. Marinos
42	Justin Homma	(Japan) (United States)	26 August 2005 (age 21)	(Japan) Matsumoto Yamaga
43	Kaito Yamada	(Japan)	31 August 2006 (age 20)	(United States) Tacoma Defiance
57	Ryosuke Irie	(Japan)	5 November 2004 (age 22)	(Japan) Juntendo University
Midfielders
2	Nanasei Iino	(Japan)	2 October 1996 (age 30)	(Japan) Sagan Tosu
5	Yuta Goke	(Japan)	30 June 1999 (age 27)	(Japan) Vegalta Sendai
6	Takahiro Ogihara	(Japan)	5 October 1991 (age 35)	(Japan) Yokohama F. Marinos
7	Yosuke Ideguchi	(Japan)	23 August 1996 (age 30)	(Japan) Avispa Fukuoka
13	Daiju Sasaki	(Japan)	17 September 1999 (age 27)	(Brazil) Palmeiras
17	Issei Takahashi	(Japan)	20 April 1998 (age 28)	(Japan) JEF United Chiba
18	Haruya Ide	(Japan)	25 March 1994 (age 32)	(Japan) Tokyo Verdy
19	Makoto Mitsuta	(Japan)	20 July 1999 (age 27)	(Japan) Gamba Osaka
20	Kota Watanabe	(Japan)	18 October 1998 (age 28)	(Japan) Yokohama F.Marinos
23	Yuan Iwamoto	(Japan)	15 April 2006 (age 20)	(Japan) Chukyo University
25	Yuya Kuwasaki	(Japan)	15 May 1998 (age 28)	(Japan) V-Varen Nagasaki
28	Kento Hamasaki	(Japan)	16 June 2007 (age 19)	Youth Team
33	Rikuto Hashimoto	(Japan)	2 April 2005 (age 21)	(Japan) Roasso Kumamoto
38	Juzo Ura	(Japan)	21 May 2004 (age 22)	(Japan) Kataller Toyama
44	Mitsuki Hidaka	(Japan)	11 May 2003 (age 23)	(Spain) CD Atlético Paso
58	Sota Onishi	(Japan)	12 April 2007 (age 19)	Youth Team
Forwards
9	Anderson Lopes	(Brazil)	15 September 1993 (age 33)	(Singapore) Lion City Sailors
10	Yuya Osako	(Japan)	18 May 1990 (age 36)	(Germany) Werder Bremen
11	Yoshinori Muto	(Japan)	15 July 1992 (age 34)	(Spain) SD Eibar
26	Jean Patric	(Brazil)	14 July 1997 (age 29)	(Japan) Cerezo Osaka
29	Ren Komatsu	(Japan)	10 September 1998 (age 28)	(Japan) Blaublitz Akita
40	Kotaro Uchino	(Japan)	19 June 2004 (age 22)	(Denmark) Brondby IF
46	Sota Ito	(Japan)	24 September 2007 (age 19)	(Japan) Kyoto Tachi High School
53	Hayato Watanabe	(Japan)	6 April 2007 (age 19)	Youth Team
55	Yuta Miyahara	(Japan)	7 April 2005 (age 21)	(Poland) Górnik Zabrze B
94	Erik	(Brazil)	18 July 1994 (age 32)	(Japan) Machida Zelvia
Players left on loan during season
30	Kakeru Yamauchi	(Japan)	6 January 2002 (age 24)	(Japan) University of Tsukuba
34	Yusei Ozaki	(Japan)	26 July 2003 (age 23)	(Japan) RB Omiya Ardija
36	Shuto Adachi	(Japan)	15 July 2004 (age 22)	(Japan) Thespa Gunma
37	Shogo Terasaka	(Japan)	6 June 2004 (age 22)	(Japan) Zweigen Kanazawa
	Haruka Motoyama	(Japan)	5 June 1999 (age 27)	(Japan) Fagiano Okayama
45	David Aizawa	(Japan)	2 August 2003 (age 23)	(Japan) Hosei University
51	Taiga Seguchi (M)	(Japan)	10 January 2008 (age 18)	Youth Team
80	Boniface Nduka	(Japan) (Nigeria)	15 February 1996 (age 30)	(Japan) Yokohama FC
Players who left club during / mid-season

Last updated: 17 January 2024.
Source: Vissel Kobe website

== Club officials ==
Club officials for 2026.

Position	Name
Manager	(Germany) Michael Skibbe
Head Coach	(Germany) Serhat Umar
Assistant coaches	(Japan) Masafumi Nakaguchi (Japan) Hideo Hashimoto
Coaches	(Japan) Kosuke Takeya
Goalkeeper coach	(Japan) Takuya Matsumoto
Asst & U21 Goalkeeper coach	(Japan) Daiki Tomii
Physical coach	(Japan) Takeshi Ikoma (Japan) Yoshinori Furube (Japan) Toshiki Yoshimitsu
Conditioning coach	(Japan) Hikaru Fujii
U21 Head Coach	(Japan) Makoto Teguramori

== Friendly ==
=== Tour of Sapporo (12-25 July) ===
15 July 1	Vissel Kobe	5–0	Sapporo University	Sapporo
				Stadium: Shirahatayama Stadium

18 July 2	Vissel Kobe	1–1	Hokkaido Consadole Sapporo	Sapporo
		Report		Stadium: Shirahatayama Stadium

22 July 3	Vissel Kobe	6–1	FC Imabari	Sapporo
				Stadium: Shirahatayama Stadium

== Transfers ==
=== In ===
Pre-season

Date	Position	Player	Transferred from	Ref
Permanent Transfer
31 May 2026	DF	(Japan) Shogo Terasaka	(Japan) Zweigen Kanazawa	End of loan
31 May 2026	DF	(Japan) Haruka Motoyama	(Japan) Fagiano Okayama	End of loan
31 May 2026	DF	(Japan) Yusei Ozaki	(Japan) RB Omiya Ardija	End of loan
31 May 2026	MF	(Japan) Shuto Adachi	(Japan) Thespa Gunma	End of loan
31 May 2026	FW	(Japan) Taisei Miyashiro	(Spain) Las Palmas	End of loan
23 June 2026	FW	(Japan) Kōta Watanabe	(Japan) Yokohama F. Marinos	Undisclosed
26 June 2026	FW	(Brazil) Anderson Lopes	(Singapore) Lion City Sailors	Undisclosed
28 July 2026	MF	(Japan) Issei Takahashi	(Japan) JEF United Chiba	Undisclosed
9 September 2026	FW	(Brazil) Erik	(Japan) Machida Zelvia	Undisclosed
August 2026	MF	(Spain) Stanko Jurić	(Spain) Valladolid	Undisclosed
August 2026	MF	(Japan) Koshiro Sumi	(Japan) Júbilo Iwata	Undisclosed
Loan Transfer

=== Out ===
Pre-season

Date	Position	Player	Transferred From	Ref
Permanent Transfer
31 May 2026	FW	(Japan) Kotaro Uchino	(Denmark) Brondby IF	End of loan
31 May 2026	FW	(Japan) Makoto Mitsuta	(Japan) Gamba Osaka	End of loan
23 June 2026	FW	(Japan) Takashi Inui	(Japan) Jubilo Iwata	Free
25 June 2026	FW	(Japan) Taisei Miyashiro	(Spain) Las Palmas	Free
20 July 2026	DF	(Japan) Rikuto Hirose	(Japan) Kashima Antlers	Undisclosed
Loan Transfer
21 June 2026	DF	(Japan) Yusei Ozaki	(Japan) RB Omiya Ardija	Season loan
24 June 2026	MF	(Japan) Shuto Adachi	(Japan) Thespa Gunma	Season loan
25 June 2026	DF	(Japan) Haruka Motoyama	(Japan) Fagiano Okayama	Season loan
26 June 2026	DF	(Japan) Shogo Terasaka	(Japan) Zweigen Kanazawa	Season loan
26 June 2026	MF	(Japan) Kakeru Yamauchi	(Japan) Sagan Tosu	Season loan
29 July 2026	FW	(Japan) David Aizawa	(Japan) Oita Trinita	Season loan
14 September 2026	MF	(Japan) Taiga Seguchi	(Slovakia) FC Košice	Season loan
16 September 2026	DF	(Japan) (Nigeria) Boniface Nduka	(Japan) JEF United Chiba	Season loan

== Competitions ==
=== J1 League ===
Pos	Team	Pld	W	D	L	GF	GA	GD	Pts	Qualification or relegation
3	Sanfrecce Hiroshima	14	9	3	2	32	10	+22	30	Qualification for the AFC Champions League Elite league stage
4	Machida Zelvia	14	8	5	1	30	10	+20	29	Qualification for the AFC Champions League Elite playoff round
5	Vissel Kobe	14	8	3	3	23	14	+9	27	
6	Kashima Antlers	14	7	2	5	29	24	+5	23	
7	Yokohama F. Marinos	14	5	7	2	21	15	+6	22	

Updated to match(es) played on 8 November 2026. Source: JLeague.jp,
Rules for classification: 1) Points; 2) Goal difference; 3) Goals scored; 4) Head-to-head points; 5) Head-to-head goal difference; 6) Head-to-head goals scored; 7) Fewer disciplinary points.

==== Matches ====
8 August 1	Avispa Fukuoka	0–1	Vissel Kobe	Fukuoka
	Masato Shigemi (yellow card) 33'	Report	Yuya Osako 23'; Matheus Thuler (yellow card) 53'	Stadium: Best Denki Stadium; Attendance: 17,538; Referee: Masuya Ueda

15 August 2	Vissel Kobe	2–2	FC Tokyo	Kobe
	Yuya Osako 40'; Yoshinori Muto 90+3'	Report	Motoki Nagakura 34', 69'	Stadium: Noevir Stadium Kobe; Attendance: 26,335; Referee: Yusuke Araki

22 August 3	Yokohama F. Marinos	1–0	Vissel Kobe	Yokohama
	Shin Miidera 8' (yellow card) 48'; Ryotaro Tsunoda (yellow card) 36'; Kaina Tanimura (yellow card) 40'; Jun Amano (yellow card) 80'	Report	Yosuke Ideguchi (yellow card) 66'; Kota Watanabe (yellow card) 71'	Stadium: Nissan Stadium; Attendance: 36,601; Referee: Akihiko Ikeuchi

29 August 4	Vissel Kobe	1–0	Cerezo Osaka	Kobe
	Ren Komatsu 71' (pen.) (yellow card) 53'; Yuta Goke (yellow card) 80'	Report	Lucas Fernandes (yellow card) 75'	Stadium: Noevir Stadium Kobe; Attendance: 22,767; Referee: Takafumi Mikuriya

2 September 5	Tokyo Verdy	0–2	Vissel Kobe	Chōfu
	Ryota Inoue (yellow card) 18'; Yuya Fukuda (yellow card) 36'; Soma Meshino (yellow card) 76'	Report	Issei Takahashi 16'; Katsuya Nagato 51'; Yuta Goke (yellow card) 39'	Stadium: Ajinomoto Stadium; Attendance: 9,087; Referee: Masuya Ueda

6 September 6	Vissel Kobe	3–1	V-Varen Nagasaki	Kobe
	Katsuya Nagato 2'; Yuta Goke 34', 52'	Report	Tenmu Matsumoto 90+2'; Motoki Hasegawa (yellow card) 39'; Norman Campbell (yellow card) 89'	Stadium: Noevir Stadium Kobe; Attendance: 16,868; Referee: Koei Koya

11 September 7 (Rescheduled)	Vissel Kobe	2–1	Kashima Antlers	Kobe
	Yuya Osako 56' (pen.); Tetsushi Yamakawa 77'; Rikuto Hirose (yellow card) 25'	Report	Aleksandar Čavrić 73'; Keisuke Tsukui (yellow card) 23'; Kento Misao (yellow card) 90'	Stadium: Noevir Stadium Kobe; Attendance: 17,110; Referee: Hiroyuki Kimura

20 September 8	Gamba Osaka	0–1	Vissel Kobe	Osaka
	Shuto Abe (yellow card) 40'; Shinnosuke Nakatani (yellow card) 45+3'	Report	Erik 90'; Ryoya Yamashita (yellow card) 70'	Stadium: Suita City Football Stadium; Attendance: 35,884; Referee: Ryo Tanimoto

9 October 9	Kashiwa Reysol	4–2	Vissel Kobe	Chiba
	Shōta Fujio 29'; Hinata Yamauchi 54'; Tojiro Kubo 64'; Yusuke Segawa 84'; Wataru Harada (yellow card) 90'	Report	Ren Komatsu 83'; Diego 89'; Michael Skibbe (yellow card) 90+1'	Stadium: Sankyo Frontier Kashiwa Stadium; Attendance: 13,478; Referee: Koichiro Fukushima

18 October 10 (Rescheduled)	Fagiano Okayama	0–3	Vissel Kobe	Okayama
	Lucao (yellow card) 3'; Oberdan (yellow card) 43'; Léo Gaúcho (yellow card) 47'; Yoshitake Suzuki (yellow card) 63'	Report	Yuya Osako 49', 56'; Matheus Thuler 64'	Stadium: City Light Stadium; Attendance: 14,874; Referee: Hayato Shimizu

21 October 11	Kawasaki Frontale	2–1	Vissel Kobe	Kawasaki
	Marcinho 61'; Tatsuya Ito 71'; Asahi Sasaki (yellow card) 53'	Report	Yuya Osako 73'; Yoshinori Muto (yellow card) 79'	Stadium: Kawasaki Todoroki Stadium; Attendance: 20,737; Referee: Futoshi Nakamura

24 October 12	Vissel Kobe	0–0	Machida Zelvia	Kobe
	Diego (yellow card) 90'	Report	Takuma Nishimura (yellow card) 16'; Hiroyuki Mae (yellow card) 71'	Stadium: Noevir Stadium Kobe; Attendance: 22,238; Referee: Akihiko Ikeuchi

31 October 13	Vissel Kobe	3–1	Nagoya Grampus	Kobe
	Yoshinori Muto 38'; Erik 47'; Ren Komatsu 90+1'; Tetsushi Yamakawa (yellow card) 21'	Report	Kensuke Nagai 3'; Ryuji Izumi (yellow card) 52'	Stadium: Noevir Stadium Kobe; Attendance: 17,956; Referee: Koji Takasaki

8 November 14	Vissel Kobe	2–2	Urawa Red Diamonds	Tokyo
	Yoshinori Muto 43', 90+4'	Report	Ryoma Watanabe 69'; Takuro Kaneko 90'	Stadium: MUFG Stadium; Attendance: 40,070; Referee: Koei Koya

20 November 15 (Rescheduled)	Vissel Kobe	1–2	Mito HollyHock	Kobe
	Yuya Osako 51'; Tetsushi Yamakawa (red card) 59'	Report	Motoki Nishihara 5'; Yasuki Kimoto 89'; Takumi Mase (yellow card) 72'	Stadium: Noevir Stadium Kobe; Attendance: 12,549; Referee: Koko Nagamine

14 April 16 (Rescheduled)	Kyoto Sanga	–	Vissel Kobe	Kyoto
		Report		Stadium: Sanga Stadium by Kyocera

28 November 17	Vissel Kobe	–	JEF United Chiba	Kobe
		Report		Stadium: Noevir Stadium Kobe

6 December 18	Sanfrecce Hiroshima	–	Vissel Kobe	Hiroshima
		Report		Stadium: Edion Peace Wing Hiroshima

12 December 19	Shimizu S-Pulse	–	Vissel Kobe	Shizuoka
		Report		Stadium: IAI Stadium Nihondaira

19 December 20	Vissel Kobe	–	Yokohama F. Marinos	Kobe
		Report		Stadium: Noevir Stadium Kobe

13 February 21	Vissel Kobe	–	Kawasaki Frontale	Kobe
		Report		Stadium: Noevir Stadium Kobe

20 February 22	Cerezo Osaka	–	Vissel Kobe	Osaka
		Report		Stadium: Yodoko Sakura Stadium

27 February 23	Mito HollyHock	–	Vissel Kobe	Mito
		Report		Stadium: K's denki Stadium Mito

6 March 24	Vissel Kobe	–	Fagiano Okayama	Kobe
		Report		Stadium: Noevir Stadium Kobe

10 March 25	Vissel Kobe	–	Gamba Osaka	Kobe
		Report		Stadium: Noevir Stadium Kobe

13 March 26	Vissel Kobe	–	Shimizu S-Pulse	Kobe
		Report		Stadium: Noevir Stadium Kobe

20 March 27	Nagoya Grampus	–	Vissel Kobe	Toyota
		Report		Stadium: Toyota Stadium

3 April 28	Vissel Kobe	–	Sanfrecce Hiroshima	Kobe
		Report		Stadium: Noevir Stadium Kobe

10 April 29	Machida Zelvia	–	Vissel Kobe	Tokyo
		Report		Stadium: Machida GION Stadium

17 April 30	V-Varen Nagasaki	–	Vissel Kobe	Nagasaki
		Report		Stadium: Peace Stadium Connected by SoftBank

24 April 31	Vissel Kobe	–	Avispa Fukuoka	Kobe
		Report		Stadium: Noevir Stadium Kobe

29 April 32	Kashima Antlers	–	Vissel Kobe	Tokyo
		Report		Stadium: Japan National Stadium

3 May 33	Vissel Kobe	–	Kashiwa Reysol	Kobe
		Report		Stadium: Noevir Stadium Kobe

9 May 34	Urawa Red Diamonds	–	Vissel Kobe	Saitama
		Report		Stadium: Saitama Stadium 2002

15 May 35	Vissel Kobe	–	Tokyo Verdy	Kobe
		Report		Stadium: Noevir Stadium Kobe

22 May 36	JEF United Chiba	–	Vissel Kobe	Chiba
		Report		Stadium: Fukuda Denshi Arena

29 May 37	FC Tokyo	–	Vissel Kobe	Chōfu
		Report		Stadium: Ajinomoto Stadium

6 June 38	Vissel Kobe	–	Kyoto Sanga	Kobe
		Report		Stadium: Noevir Stadium Kobe

=== Emperor's Cup ===
26 August Rd 2	Vissel Kobe	2–1	Veroskronos Tsuno	Kobe
	Ren Komatsu 38', 74'; Hyoei Kawabata (yellow card) 23'	Report	Tomoya Hamada 52'	Stadium: Noevir Stadium Kobe; Attendance: 3,886; Referee: Yuzo Sutani

23 September Rd 3	Vissel Kobe	1–0	Sagan Tosu	Kobe
	Erik 78'; Yuya Kuwasaki (yellow card) 28'; Mitsuki Hidaka (yellow card) 46'; Yosuke Ideguchi (yellow card) 51'	Report		Stadium: Noevir Stadium Kobe; Attendance: 6,887; Referee: Atsushi Kamimura

9 December Rd of 16	Vissel Kobe	–	Shimizu S-Pulse	Kobe
				Stadium: Noevir Stadium Kobe

=== J.League Cup ===
11 November Prime Rd QF Leg 1	Vissel Kobe	0–1	Machida Zelvia	Kobe
		Report	Mitchell Duke 85'; Kim Min Tae (yellow card) 37'	Stadium: Noevir Stadium Kobe; Attendance: 5,695; Referee: Koichiro Fukushima

15 November Prime Rd QF Leg 2	Machida Zelvia	1–1	Vissel Kobe	Tokyo
	Kessman Egbus Mikuni 81'; Kim Min Tae (yellow card) 35'; Kosei Tani (yellow card) 89'	Report	Ren Komatsu 85'; Erik (yellow card) 40'; Yoshinori Muto (yellow card) 80'	Stadium: Machida GION Stadium; Attendance: 3,803; Referee: Futoshi Nakamura

Machida Zelvia won 2–1 on aggregate.

=== AFC Champions League ===
==== League stage ====
Win Draw Loss

Pos	Team	Pld	W	D	L	GF	GA	GD	Pts	Qualification
1	(Japan) Vissel Kobe	4	4	0	0	8	3	+5	12	Advance to round of 16
2	(Japan) Kashima Antlers	4	3	1	0	11	1	+10	10	Advance to round of 16
3	(Japan) Gamba Osaka	4	2	2	0	11	6	+5	8	Advance to round of 16
4	(Japan) Kashiwa Reysol	4	2	1	1	8	3	+5	7	Advance to round of 16
5	(China) Shanghai Port	4	2	1	1	13	10	+3	7	Advance to round of 16

Updated to match(es) played on 4 November 2026. Source: AFC
Rules for classification: 1) points; 2) goal difference; 3) number of goals scored; 4) number of matches won; 5) penalty shoot-out if only two teams remain tied and played each other on the final matchday 6) fair play ranking; 7) drawing of lots

15 September 2026 1	Port (Thailand)	1–2	(Japan) Vissel Kobe	Pathum Thani, Thailand
	Ren Komatsu 45+4' (o.g.); Kevin Mendes (yellow card) 66'; Suphanan Bureerat (yellow card) 77'	Report	Ren Komatsu 10'; Yoshinori Muto 61'; Caetano (yellow card) 72'; Shuichi Gonda (yellow card) 74'	Stadium: Thammasat Stadium; Attendance: 1,779; Referee: Choi Hyun-jai (South Korea)

14 October 2026 2	Vissel Kobe (Japan)	2–0	(South Korea) Jeonbuk Hyundai Motors	Kobe, Japan
	Yuya Osako 12'; Yuya Kuwasaki 68'	Report		Stadium: Noevir Stadium Kobe; Attendance: 7,136; Referee: Ammar Mahfoodh (Bahrain)

27 October 2026 3	Daejeon Hana Citizen (South Korea)	0–1	(Japan) Vissel Kobe	Daejeon, South Korea
			Ren Komatsu 83'; Yuya Kuwasaki (yellow card) 74'	Stadium: Daejeon World Cup Stadium; Attendance: 6,278; Referee: Nazmi Nasaruddin (Malaysia)

3 November 2026 4	Vissel Kobe (Japan)	3–2	(Thailand) Ratchaburi	Kobe, Japan
	Kento Hamasaki 36'; Erik 83'; Tetsushi Yamakawa 88'; Kōta Watanabe (yellow card) 27'	Report	Phongsakorn Sangkasopha 64' (yellow card) 6'; Ekanit Panya 82'; Sanchai Nontasila (yellow card) 10'; Thossawat Limwannasathian (yellow card) 40'; Daniel Ting (yellow card) 90'	Stadium: Noevir Stadium Kobe; Attendance: 7,370; Referee: Ahmad Al-Ali (Kuwait)

25 November 2026 5	Cong An Hanoi (Vietnam)	–	(Japan) Vissel Kobe	Hanoi, Vietnam
				Stadium: Hàng Đẫy Stadium

1 December 2026 6	Vissel Kobe (Japan)	–	(Australia) Newcastle Jets	Kobe, Japan
				Stadium: Noevir Stadium Kobe

10 February 2027 7	Vissel Kobe (Japan)	–	(South Korea) Pohang Steelers	Kobe, Japan
				Stadium: Noevir Stadium Kobe

16 February 2027 8	Buriram United (Thailand)	–	(Japan) Vissel Kobe	Buriram, Thailand
				Stadium: Chang Arena

== Team statistics ==
=== Appearances and goals ===
As of 20 Nov 2026

No.	Pos.	Player	J1 League		Emperor's Cup		J.League Cup		Super Cup		2026–27 AFC Champions League Elite		Total	
No.	Pos.	Player	Apps	Goals	Apps	Goals	Apps	Goals	Apps	Goals	Apps	Goals	Apps	Goals
1	GK	(Japan) Daiya Maekawa	3	0	0	0	1	0	0	0	0	0	4	0
2	DF	(Japan) Nanasei Iino	4+2	0	1+1	0	2	0	0	0	2	0	12	0
3	DF	(Brazil) Matheus Thuler	15	1	0	0	2	0	0	0	0+1	0	18	1
4	DF	(Japan) Tetsushi Yamakawa	13+1	1	1+1	0	1	0	0	0	3+1	1	21	2
5	MF	(Japan) Yuta Goke	10+2	2	1	0	1	0	0	0	3	0	17	2
6	MF	(Japan) Takahiro Ogihara	0	0	0	0	0	0	0	0	0	0	0	0
7	MF	(Japan) Yosuke Ideguchi	15	0	0+2	0	1	0	0	0	2+2	0	22	0
9	FW	(Brazil) Anderson Lopes	0+1	0	0	0	0	0	0	0	0	0	1	0
10	FW	(Japan) Yuya Osako	11+1	7	0+1	0	1+1	0	0	0	1+1	1	17	8
11	FW	(Japan) Yoshinori Muto	11+1	4	0+1	0	1+1	0	0	0	1+3	1	19	5
13	MF	(Japan) Daiju Sasaki	2+2	0	0	0	0+2	0	0	0	0	0	6	0
15	DF	(Brazil) Diego	14+1	1	0+2	0	1+1	0	0	0	2+1	0	22	1
16	DF	(Brazil) Caetano	1+2	0	1	0	0	0	0	0	3+1	0	8	0
17	MF	(Japan) Issei Takahashi	6+2	1	1+1	0	0	0	0	0	1	0	11	1
18	MF	(Japan) Haruya Ide	0+2	0	1	0	0	0	0	0	0	0	3	0
19	FW	(Japan) Makoto Mitsuta	0	0	0	0	0	0	0	0	0	0	0	0
20	MF	(Japan) Kōta Watanabe	0+1	0	2	0	1	0	0	0	2	0	6	0
21	GK	(Japan) Shota Arai	0	0	2	0	0	0	0	0	1	0	3	0
23	DF	(Japan) Yuan Iwamoto	5+6	0	0	0	0	0	0	0	0	0	11	0
24	DF	(Japan) (United States) Gōtoku Sakai	13	0	0+1	0	1	0	0	0	2	0	17	0
25	MF	(Japan) Yuya Kuwasaki	4+3	0	2	0	1	0	0	0	4	1	14	1
26	FW	(Brazil) Jean Patric	1+8	0	1+1	0	1+1	0	0	0	2+1	0	16	0
28	MF	(Japan) Kento Hamasaki	0+2	0	0	0	0	0	0	0	1	1	3	1
29	FW	(Japan) Ren Komatsu	4+11	3	2	2	1+1	1	0	0	3	2	22	8
31	DF	(Japan) Takuya Iwanami	1+1	0	1	0	1	0	0	0	2	0	6	0
33	MF	(Japan) Rikuto Hashimoto	0	0	0	0	0	0	0	0	0	0	0	0
35	FW	(Japan) Niina Tominaga	0	0	0	0	0	0	0	0	0	0	0	0
38	MF	(Japan) Juzo Ura	0	0	0	0	0	0	0	0	0	0	0	0
40	FW	(Japan) Kotaro Uchino	0	0	0	0	0	0	0	0	0	0	0	0
41	DF	(Japan) Katsuya Nagato	13+1	2	2	0	2	0	0	0	4	0	22	2
42	DF	(Japan) (United States) Justin Homma	0	0	0	0	0	0	0	0	0	0	0	0
43	MF	(Japan) Kaito Yamada	0	0	1	0	0	0	0	0	0	0	1	0
44	MF	(Japan) Mitsuki Hidaka	1+6	0	2	0	0	0	0	0	1+2	0	12	0
57	MF	(Japan) Ryosuke Irie	0	0	0	0	0	0	0	0	0	0	0	0
62	MF	(Japan) Hyoei Kawabata	0+2	0	0+1	0	1	0	0	0	0+1	0	5	0
71	GK	(Japan) Shūichi Gonda	12	0	0	0	1	0	0	0	3	0	16	0
94	FW	(Brazil) Erik	5+3	2	1	1	1+1	0	0	0	1+2	1	14	4
Players featured on a match for the team, but left the club mid-season, either permanently or on loan transfer
80	DF	(Japan) (Nigeria) Boniface Nduka	0+1	0	0	0	0	0	0	0	0	0	1	0
