= 2024 Vissel Kobe season =

Vissel Kobe
2024 season
- Chairman: Yuki Chifu
- Manager: Takayuki Yoshida
- Stadium: Noevir Stadium Kobe; Hyōgo-ku, Kōbe, Hyōgo
- J1 League: 1st (champions)
- Emperor's Cup: Winners
- J.League Cup: First round
- ACL Elite: League phase
- Japanese Super Cup: Runners-up
- Top goalscorer: League: Yoshinori Muto (13); All: Taisei Miyashiro (18)
- Average home league attendance: 21,156
Home colours	Away colours
- All statistics correct as of 8 December 2024.

The 2024 Vissel Kobe season was their 58th season in existence and the 9th consecutive season in the J1 League, since the club earned promotion back to it on 2013. In addition to the domestic league, in which they were the defending champions, Vissel Kobe are participated in this season's editions of the Japanese Super Cup, Emperor's Cup, the J.League Cup and the AFC Champions League.

== Squad ==
=== Season squad ===
Squad no.	Name	Nationality	Position(s)	Date of birth	Last club
Goalkeepers
1	Daiya Maekawa	(Japan)	GK	9 August 1994 (age 32)	(Japan) Kansai University
21	Shota Arai	(Japan)	GK	1 November 1988 (age 38)	(Japan) JEF United Chiba
39	Shioki Takayama	(Japan)	GK	13 June 2001 (age 25)	(Japan) University of Tsukuba
50	Powell Obinna Obi	(Japan) (Nigeria)	GK	18 December 1997 (age 28)	(Japan) Yokohama F. Marinos
Defenders
3	Matheus Thuler	(Brazil)	CB	10 March 1999 (age 27)	(France) Montpellier HSC
4	Tetsushi Yamakawa	(Japan)	CB	1 October 1997 (age 29)	(Japan) University of Tsukuba
15	Yuki Honda	(Japan)	LB	2 January 1991 (age 35)	(Japan) Kyoto Sanga FC
19	Ryo Hatsuse	(Japan)	LB	10 July 1997 (age 29)	(Japan) Avispa Fukuoka
23	Rikuto Hirose	(Japan)	RB	23 September 1995 (age 31)	(Japan) Kashima Antlers
24	Gōtoku Sakai	(Japan) (United States)	RB / LB	14 March 1991 (age 35)	(Germany) Hamburger SV
55	Takuya Iwanami	(Japan)	CB	18 June 1994 (age 32)	(Japan) Urawa Red Diamonds
81	Ryuho Kikuchi	(Japan)	CB	9 December 1996 (age 29)	(Japan) Renofa Yamaguchi
Midfielders
2	Nanasei Iino	(Japan)	RB / RM	2 October 1996 (age 30)	(Japan) Sagan Tosu
6	Takahiro Ogihara	(Japan)	DM / CM	5 October 1991 (age 35)	(Japan) Yokohama F. Marinos
7	Yosuke Ideguchi	(Japan)	CM	23 August 1996 (age 30)	(Japan) Avispa Fukuoka
14	Koya Yuruki	(Japan)	LM / RM	3 July 1995 (age 31)	(Japan) Urawa Red Diamonds
16	Mitsuki Saito	(Japan)	DM / CM	10 January 1999 (age 27)	(Japan) Gamba Osaka
18	Haruya Ide	(Japan)	RW / LW	25 March 1994 (age 32)	(Japan) Tokyo Verdy
22	Daiju Sasaki	(Japan)	AM / SS	17 September 1999 (age 27)	(Brazil) Palmeiras
25	Yuya Kuwasaki	(Japan)	DM	15 May 1998 (age 28)	(Japan) V-Varen Nagasaki
30	Kakeru Yamauchi	(Japan)	MF	6 January 2002 (age 24)	(Japan) University of Tsukuba
31	Yuya Nakasaka	(Japan)	LW / AM	8 May 1997 (age 29)	(Japan) Kyoto Sanga FC
44	Mitsuki Hidaka	(Japan)	CM	11 May 2003 (age 23)	(Spain) CD Atlético Paso
52	Kento Hamasaki	(Japan)	CM	16 June 2007 (age 19)	Youth Team
88	Ryota Morioka	(Japan)	CM	12 April 1991 (age 35)	(Belgium) Charleroi
96	Hotaru Yamaguchi (c)	(Japan)	CM / DM	6 October 1990 (age 36)	(Japan) Cerezo Osaka
Forwards
9	Taisei Miyashiro	(Japan)	RW / FW	26 May 2000 (age 26)	(Japan) Kawasaki Frontale
10	Yuya Osako	(Japan)	FW	18 May 1990 (age 36)	(Germany) Werder Bremen
11	Yoshinori Muto	(Japan)	FW	15 July 1992 (age 34)	(Spain) SD Eibar
26	Jean Patric	(Brazil)	RW / LW / AM	14 July 1997 (age 29)	(Japan) Cerezo Osaka
Players left on loan during mid-season
17	Tatsunori Sakurai	(Japan)	DM	26 July 2002 (age 24)	(Japan) Tokushima Vortis
33	Justin Homma	(Japan) (United States)	RB	26 August 2005 (age 21)	Youth Team
37	Shogo Terasaka	(Japan)	CB	6 June 2004 (age 22)	(Japan) FC Ryukyu
38	Juzo Ura	(Japan)	RM / RW	21 May 2004 (age 22)	(Japan) Fukuoka High School

Last updated: 17 January 2024.
Source: Vissel Kobe website

== Friendly ==
Preseason

7 February 2024 Friendly	Vissel Kobe (Japan)	0–0 (4–3 p)	(United States) Inter Miami CF	Tokyo, Japan
19:00 JST		Report		Stadium: Japan National Stadium; Attendance: 28,614; Referee: Oh Hyeon-jeong (South Korea)
	Penalties
	Osako (penalty scored); Miyashiro (penalty scored); Yamaguchi (penalty missed); Yuruki (penalty scored); Hatsuse (penalty missed); Iino (penalty scored)		(penalty scored) Campana; (penalty scored) Gressel; (penalty scored) Alba; (penalty missed) Taylor; (penalty missed) Allen; (penalty missed) Gregore

Mid-season

27 July 2024 J.League World Challenge	Vissel Kobe (Japan)	2–3	(England) Tottenham Hotspur	Tokyo, Japan
19:00 JST	Osako 10'; Kikuchi (yellow card) 27'; Jean Patric 64'	Report	Porro 16'; Son Heung-min 47'; Phillips (yellow card) 76'; Moore 86'	Stadium: Japan National Stadium; Attendance: 54,255; Referee: Futoshi Nakamura (Japan)

== Transfers ==
=== Arrivals ===
Date	Position	Player	From	Type	Source
31 March 2022	MF	(Japan) Kakeru Yamauchi	(Japan) University of Tsukuba	Full	
7 December 2023	GK	(Japan) Shioki Takayama	(Japan) University of Tsukuba	Full	
22 December 2023	GK	(Japan) Powell Obinna Obi	(Japan) Yokohama F. Marinos	Full	
4 January 2024	MF	(Japan) Tatsunori Sakurai	(Japan) Tokushima Vortis	Loan return	
5 January 2024	GK	(Japan) Shota Arai	(Japan) JEF United Chiba	Full	
5 January 2024	DF	(Japan) Rikuto Hirose	(Japan) Kashima Antlers	Full	
6 January 2024	FW	(Japan) Taisei Miyashiro	(Japan) Kawasaki Frontale	Full	
8 January 2024	DF	(Japan) Shogo Terasaka	(Japan) FC Ryukyu	Loan return	
8 January 2024	MF	(Japan) Yuya Kuwasaki	(Japan) V-Varen Nagasaki	Full	
9 January 2024	DF	(Japan) Takuya Iwanami	(Japan) Urawa Red Diamonds	Full	
12 January 2024	MF	(Japan) Mitsuki Saito	(Japan) Shonan Bellmare	Full	

=== Departures ===
Date	Position	Player	To	Type	Source
14 December 2023	GK	(Japan) Ryotaro Hironaga		Released	
27 December 2023	MF	(Japan) Toya Izumi	(Japan) Omiya Ardija	Loan	
27 December 2023	DF	(Japan) Leo Osaki	(United Arab Emirates) Emirates Club	Full	
28 December 2023	MF	(Hungary) Bálint Vécsei		Released	
4 January 2024	DF	(Japan) Shohei Takahashi	(Japan) FC Machida Zelvia	Loan return	
5 January 2024	GK	(Japan) Yuya Tsuboi	(Japan) Júbilo Iwata	Loan	
6 January 2024	GK	(Brazil) Phelipe Megiolaro	(Japan) Yokohama FC	Full	
6 January 2024	MF	(Spain) Juan Mata		Released	
7 January 2024	FW	(Japan) Shuhei Kawasaki	(Portugal) Portimonense S.C.	Loan return	
7 January 2024	MF	(Japan) Mizuki Arai	(Japan) Yokohama FC	Loan return	
7 January 2024	DF	(Japan) Yusei Ozaki	(Japan) Ehime FC	Loan	
8 January 2024	MF	(Japan) Shuto Adachi	(Japan) Iwate Grulla Morioka	Loan	

== Competitions ==
=== J1 League ===
Pos	Team	Pld	W	D	L	GF	GA	GD	Pts	Qualification or relegation
1	Vissel Kobe (C)	38	21	9	8	61	36	+25	72	Qualification for the AFC Champions League Elite league stage (Note: Since the winners of the 2024 Emperor's Cup, Vissel Kobe, had already qualified for the Champions League Elite, the spot given to the Emperor's Cup winners (Champions League Elite) was passed to the third-placed team. Consequently, the spot given to the third-placed team (Champions League Two) was passed to the fourth-placed team.)
2	Sanfrecce Hiroshima	38	19	11	8	72	43	+29	68	Qualification for the AFC Champions League Elite league stage
3	Machida Zelvia	38	19	9	10	54	34	+20	66	Qualification for the AFC Champions League Elite league stage
4	Gamba Osaka	38	18	12	8	49	35	+14	66	Qualification for the AFC Champions League Two group stage
5	Kashima Antlers	38	18	11	9	60	41	+19	65	

Source: JLeague.co, JLeague.jp, J.League Data Site
Rules for classification: 1) Points; 2) Goal difference; 3) Goals scored; 4) Head-to-head points; 5) Head-to-head goal difference; 6) Head-to-head goals scored; 7) Fewer disciplinary points.
(C) Champions

==== Results by matchday ====
Round	1	2	3	4	5	6	7	8	9	10	11	12	13	14	15	16	17	18	19	20	21	22	23	24	25	26	27	28	29	30	31	32	33	34	35	36	37	38
Ground	A	H	A	H	H	A	H	A	A	H	A	H	A	H	A	H	A																					
Result	W	L	W	D	W	D	L	W	W	L	W	W	W	W	L	L	D																					
Position	2	8	4	6	3	4	5	4	4	4	2	2	1	1	2	3	4																					

Updated to match(es) played on 1 June 2024. Source: J. League Data Site
A = Away; H = Home; W = Win; D = Draw; L = Loss

==== Matches ====
The full league fixtures were released on 23 January 2024.

24 February 1	Júbilo Iwata	0–2	Vissel Kobe	Iwata
13:03 JST	Makito Ito (yellow card) 90+2'	Report	Yuruki 5'; Sasaki 49'	Stadium: Yamaha Stadium; Attendance: 14,778; Referee: Shu Kawamata

2 March 2	Vissel Kobe	0–1	Kashiwa Reysol	Kobe
13:03 JST	Yosuke Ideguchi (yellow card) 78'	Report	Kinoshita 83'; Tomoya Inukai (yellow card) 20'; Tomoki Takamine (yellow card) 42'	Stadium: Noevir Stadium Kobe; Attendance: 23,107; Referee: Ismail Elfath

9 March 3	FC Tokyo	1–2	Vissel Kobe	Chōfu
16:03 JST	Koizumi 50'; Masato Morishige (yellow card) 8'; Trevisan (red card) 70'	Report	Miyashiro 57'; Osako 74'; Matheus Thuler (yellow card) 89'	Stadium: Ajinomoto Stadium; Attendance: 24,974; Referee: Hayato Shimizu

16 March 4	Vissel Kobe	0–0	Sanfrecce Hiroshima	Kobe
14:04 JST	Matheus Thuler (yellow card) 54'; Yuki Honda (yellow card) 74'	Report	Sho Sasaki (yellow card) 40'; Takaaki Shichi (yellow card) 87'; Hayato Araki (yellow card) 90+3'	Stadium: Noevir Stadium Kobe; Attendance: 21,669; Referee: Hiroyuki Kimura

30 March 5	Vissel Kobe	6–1	Hokkaido Consadole Sapporo	Kobe
14:03 JST	Osako 8'; Miyashiro 24', 49'; Muto 43', 90+5'; Yamakawa 72'; Takahiro Ogihara (yellow card) 44'; Tetsushi Yamakawa (yellow card) 47'	Report	Ideguchi 73' (o.g.); Toya Nakamura (yellow card) 35'	Stadium: Noevir Stadium Kobe; Attendance: 17,374; Referee: Hiroki Kasahara

3 April 6	Sagan Tosu	0–0	Vissel Kobe	Tosu
19:04 JST	Cayman Togashi (yellow card) 22'	Report		Stadium: Ekimae Real Estate Stadium; Attendance: 6,734; Referee: Yuichi Mishimura

7 April 7	Vissel Kobe	1–2	Yokohama F. Marinos	Kobe
14:03 JST	Miyashiro 66'; Matheus Thuler (yellow card) 59'; Maekawa (red card)	Report	Anderson Lopes 47'; Yan Matheus 83'; Ren Kato (yellow card) 14'; Taiki Watanabe (yellow card) 19'; Anderson Lopes (yellow card) 90+6'	Stadium: Noevir Stadium Kobe; Attendance: 23,456; Referee: Akihiko Ikeuchi

13 April 8	Machida Zelvia	1–2	Vissel Kobe	Tokyo
15:03 JST	Drešević 90+6'; Junya Suzuki (yellow card) 26'; Kai Shibato (yellow card) 32'; Keiya Sento (yellow card) 61'	Report	Yamauchi 45'; Muto 89'	Stadium: Japan National Stadium; Attendance: 39,080; Referee: Futoshi Nakamura

20 April 9	Shonan Bellmare	0–1	Vissel Kobe	Hiratsuka
15:03 JST	Lukian (yellow card) 71'	Report	Muto 90+3' (pen.)	Stadium: Lemon Gas Stadium Hiratsuka; Attendance: 10,618; Referee: Hayato Shimizu

27 April 10	Vissel Kobe	0–1	Kyoto Sanga	Kobe
14:03 JST		Report	Hara 55'; Hisashi Appiah Tawiah (yellow card) 4'; Kyo Sato (yellow card) 46'	Stadium: Noevir Stadium Kobe; Attendance: 22,582; Referee: Jumpei Iida

3 May 11	Nagoya Grampus	0–2	Vissel Kobe	Toyota
19:03 JST		Report	Yamaguchi 40'; Osako 81'; Taisei Miyashiro (yellow card) 70'; Matheus Thuler (yellow card) 75'	Stadium: Toyota Stadium; Attendance: 38,955; Referee: Yudai Yamamoto

6 May 12	Vissel Kobe	3–2	Albirex Niigata	Kobe
13:03 JST	Sasaki 15'; Miyashiro 25'; Endo 55' (o.g.)	Report	Fujiwara 51'; Endo 76'	Stadium: Noevir Stadium Kobe; Attendance: 21,073; Referee: Yusuke Araki

11 May 13	Cerezo Osaka	1–4	Vissel Kobe	Osaka
16:03 JST	Léo Ceará 57'; Shinji Kagawa (yellow card) 45+5'	Report	Yamaguchi 38'; Honda 44'; Osako 49'; Miyashiro 90+3'; Takahiro Ogihara (yellow card) 3'	Stadium: Yodoko Sakura Stadium; Attendance: 21,148; Referee: Yuichi Nishimura

15 May 14	Vissel Kobe	1–0	Avispa Fukuoka	Kobe
19:03 JST	Miyashiro 72'	Report	Yuji Kitajima (yellow card) 17'	Stadium: Noevir Stadium Kobe; Attendance: 10,961; Referee: Hiroyuki Kimura

19 May 15	Kashima Antlers	1–0	Vissel Kobe	Kashima
15:03 JST	Nono 81'	Report	Tetsushi Yamakawa (yellow card) 44'; Yoshinori Muto (yellow card) 53'	Stadium: Kashima Soccer Stadium; Attendance: 20,390; Referee: Hayato Shimizu

26 May 16	Vissel Kobe	0–1	Tokyo Verdy	Kobe
14:03 JST	Rikuto Hirose (yellow card) 54'	Report	Yamaguchi 65' (o.g.); Tetsuyuki Inami (yellow card) 33'; Yuto Tsunashima (yellow card) 56'	Stadium: Noevir Stadium Kobe; Attendance: 22,104; Referee: Akihiko Ikeuchi

1 June 17	Urawa Red Diamonds	1–1	Vissel Kobe	Saitama
16:03 JST	Nakajima 61'; Alexander Scholz (yellow card) 88'	Report	Ide 15'; Haruya Ide (yellow card) 43'; Matheus Thuler (yellow card) 46'; Tetsushi Yamakawa (yellow card) 70'	Stadium: Saitama Stadium 2002; Attendance: 45,976; Referee: Futoshi Nakamura

16 June 18	Vissel Kobe	1–0	Kawasaki Frontale	Tokyo
14:03 JST	Muto 43'; Gōtoku Sakai (yellow card) 50'	Report	Kento Tachibanada (yellow card) 14'	Stadium: Japan National Stadium; Attendance: 49,541; Referee: Damian Sylwestrzak

22 June 19	Gamba Osaka	2–1	Vissel Kobe	Osaka
17:33 JST	Welton 43'; 85' (o.g.); Takashi Usami (yellow card) 18'; Tokuma Suzuki (yellow card) 28'; Dawhan (yellow card) 53'	Report	Muto 90'; Takahiro Ogihara (yellow card) 37'; Tetsushi Yamakawa (yellow card) 54'	Stadium: Panasonic Stadium Suita; Attendance: 32,366; Referee: Hayato Shimizu

26 June 20	Vissel Kobe	0–0	FC Machida Zelvia	Kobe
18:03 JST		Report		Stadium: Noevir Stadium Kobe; Attendance: 16,517; Referee: Yuichi Nishimura

30 June 21	Vissel Kobe	3–1	Kashima Antlers	Kobe
18:03 JST	Muto 18'; Thuler 38'; Osako 62'; Daiya Maekawa (yellow card) 78'	Report	Čavrić 8'	Stadium: Noevir Stadium Kobe; Attendance: 21,963; Referee: Takafumi Mikuriya

5 July 22	Sanfrecce Hiroshima	1–3	Vissel Kobe	Hiroshima
18:03 JST	Arai 17'	Report	Osako 11'; Hirose 52'; Yamaguchi 71'; Matheus Thuler (yellow card) 30'; Tetsushi Yamakawa (yellow card) 41'	Stadium: Edion Peace Wing Hiroshima; Attendance: 25,119; Referee: Ryo Tanimoto

13 July 23	Hokkaido Consadole Sapporo	1–1	Vissel Kobe	Sapporo
13:03 JST	Aoki 39'	Report	Osako 48'; Jean Patric (yellow card) 90+3'	Stadium: Sapporo Dome; Attendance: 16,495; Referee: Koichiro Fukushima

20 July 24	Vissel Kobe	3–3	Nagoya Grampus	Kobe
18:03 JST	Sasaki 33'; Yamauchi 90'; Kikuchi 90+2'; Kakeru Yamauchi (yellow card) 90+5'; Daiya Maekawa (yellow card) 90+7'	Report	Patric 22'; Inagaki 54', 90+10'; Ha Chang Rae (yellow card) 90+3'	Stadium: Noevir Stadium Kobe; Attendance: 23,650; Referee: Hiroyuki Kimura

7 August 25	Kawasaki Frontale	3–0	Vissel Kobe	Kawasaki
18:03 JST	Ienaga 57'; Yamada 71', 85'; Asahi Sasaki (yellow card) 20'	Report	Nanasei Lino (yellow card) 30' (yellow-red card) 45'; Matheus Thuler (red card) 65'	Stadium: Uvance Todoroki Stadium by Fujitsu; Attendance: 18,318; Referee: Hiroki Kasahara

11 August 26	Yokohama F. Marinos	1–2	Vissel Kobe	Yokohama
18:33 JST	Eduardo 42'; Takuya Kida (yellow card) 20'	Report	Muto 45', 65'; Takahiro Ogihara (yellow card) 34'	Stadium: Nissan Stadium; Attendance: 30,419; Referee: Hiroyuki Kimura

17 August 27	Vissel Kobe	2–2	Gamba Osaka	Kobe
18:03 JST	Miyashiro 45'; Osako 84'; Yosuke Ideguchi (yellow card) 43'	Report	Usami 56'; Nakatani 90+5'; Welton (yellow card) 30'; Juan Alano (yellow card) 38'	Stadium: Noevir Stadium Kobe; Attendance: 26,654; Referee: Yudai Yamamoto

25 August 28	Vissel Kobe	2–0	Sagan Tosu	Kobe
18:03 JST	Miyashiro 33'; Sasaki 59'	Report	Kim Tae-hyeon (yellow card) 51'	Stadium: Noevir Stadium Kobe; Attendance: 18,875; Referee: Akihiko Ikeuchi

1 September 29	Avispa Fukuoka	0–2	Vissel Kobe	Fukuoka
18:03 JST	Yuji Kitajima (yellow card) 89'	Report	Osako 45+1', 82'	Stadium: Best Denki Stadium; Attendance: 12,344; Referee: Yuichi Mishimura

13 September 30	Vissel Kobe	2–1	Cerezo Osaka	Kobe
18:03 JST	Thuler 2'; Hirose 11'; Takahiro Ogihara (yellow card) 41'	Report	Ceará 51'	Stadium: Noevir Stadium Kobe; Attendance: 13,803; Referee: Takafumi Mikuriya

22 September 31	Albirex Niigata	2–3	Vissel Kobe	Niigata
17:03 JST	Nagakura 31'; Ono 36'; Eiji Miyamoto (yellow card) 13'	Report	Sakai 15'; Muto 73'; Kikuchi 90+6'; Takahiro Ogihara (yellow card) 59'	Stadium: Denka Big Swan Stadium; Attendance: 23,492; Referee: Koei Koya

28 September 32	Vissel Kobe	1–0	Urawa Red Diamonds	Kobe
18:03 JST	Muto 16'; Haruya Ide (yellow card) 38'; Koya Yuruki (yellow card) 71'; Asahi Sasaki (yellow card) 81'	Report	Takahiro Sekine (yellow card) 89'	Stadium: Noevir Stadium Kobe; Attendance: 22,109; Referee: Jumpei Iida

6 October 33	Kyoto Sanga FC	2–3	Vissel Kobe	Kyoto
13:03 JST	Elias 47'; Túlio 59' (yellow card) 59'	Report	Osako 17'; Sasaki 45+6' (yellow card) 53'; Patric 83'	Stadium: Sanga Stadium by Kyocera; Attendance: 19,082; Referee: Takuto Okabe

18 October 34	Vissel Kobe	0–2	FC Tokyo	Kobe
18:03 JST	Yosuke Ideguchi (yellow card) 5'	Report	Endo 24'; Anzai 54' (yellow card) 17'; Diego Oliveira (yellow card) 7'	Stadium: Noevir Stadium Kobe; Attendance: 15,153; Referee: Futoshi Nakamura

1 November 35	Vissel Kobe	2–0	Júbilo Iwata	Kobe
18:03 JST	Taisei Miyashiro 47'; Tetsushi Yamakawa 53'	Report	Ricardo Graça (yellow card) 25'; Shun Nakamura (yellow card) 45+3'; Shunsuke Nishikubo (yellow card) 48'; Hassan Hilu (yellow card) 61'	Stadium: Noevir Stadium Kobe; Attendance: 16,379; Referee: Yudai Yamamoto

10 November 36	Tokyo Verdy	1–1	Vissel Kobe	Tokyo
13:03 JST	Thuler 90+2' (o.g.); Yuto Tsunashima (yellow card) 88'	Report	Tetsushi Yamakawa 7'	Stadium: Ajinomoto Stadium; Attendance: 21,709; Referee: Hiroyuki Kimura

30 November 37	Kashiwa Reysol	1–1	Vissel Kobe	Chiba
13:03 JST	Kosuke Kinoshita 5' (yellow card) 30'; Diego Jara Rodrigues (yellow card) 31' (yellow-red card) 90+2'	Report	Muto 90+10' (yellow card) 90+15'; Yuya Osako (penalty missed) 90+5	Stadium: Sankyo Frontier Kashiwa Stadium; Attendance: 13,700; Referee: Takafumi Mikuriya

8 December 38	Vissel Kobe	3–0	Shonan Bellmare	Kobe
13:03 JST	Taisei Miyashiro 26'; Yoshinori Muto 43'; Takahiro Ogihara 70'	Report	Satoshi Tanaka (yellow card) 88'	Stadium: Noevir Stadium Kobe; Attendance: 27,444; Referee: Yusuke Araki

=== J.League Cup ===
The 2024 J.League Cup was expanded so that all 60 J.League clubs would participate.

17 April First round – Match 2	FC Imabari	1–2 (a.e.t.)	Vissel Kobe	Imabari
19:03	Ichihara 5'; Hikaru Arai (yellow card) 90'; Tomás Moschión (yellow card) 101'	Report	Patric 40'; Sasaki 95' (pen.); Mitsuki Hidaka (yellow card) 98'; Powell Obinna Obi (yellow card) 117'; Kakeru Yamauchi (yellow card) 120+4'	Stadium: ASICS Satoyama Stadium; Attendance: 5,097; Referee: Yusuke Araki

22 May First round – Match 3	Kataller Toyama	1–1 (5–4 p)	Vissel Kobe	Toyama
19:03	Hirose 70' (o.g.); Shimpei Nishiya (yellow card) 117'	Report	Ide 19' (yellow card) 83'; Yuya Kuwasaki (yellow card) 54'	Stadium: Toyama Stadium; Attendance: 8,223; Referee: Koichiro Fukushima
	Penalties
	Matsumoto (penalty scored); Imase (penalty scored); Leiria (penalty scored); Takahashi (penalty scored); Kawakami (penalty scored)		(penalty missed) Miyashiro; (penalty scored) Iwanami; (penalty scored) Ideguchi; (penalty scored) Hatsuse; (penalty scored) Hirose

=== Emperor's Cup ===
12 June Round 2	Vissel Kobe (1)	2–0	(3) Kataller Toyama	Kobe
19:00	Miyashiro 15'; Jean Patric 60'	Report		Stadium: Noevir Stadium Kobe; Attendance: 3,907; Referee: Koei Koya

10 July Round 3	Vissel Kobe (1)	2–0	(2) Tokushima Vortis	Naruto
18:30	Sasaki 66'; Osako 73'; Powell Obinna Obi (yellow card) 7'	Report		Stadium: Pocarisweat Stadium; Attendance: 4,630; Referee: Yuzo Sutani

21 August Round of 16	Kashiwa Reysol (1)	0–1	(1) Vissel Kobe	Kashiwa
19:03		Report	Sasaki 3'; Jean Patric (yellow card) 90+7'	Stadium: Sankyo Frontier Kashiwa Stadium; Attendance: 6,219; Referee: Jumpei Iida

25 September Quarter Final	Kashima Antlers (1)	0–3	(1) Vissel Kobe	Kobe
19:00	Kei Chinen (yellow card) 40'; Shintaro Nago (yellow card) 90+3'	Report	Morioka 15'; Sasaki 83'; Ideguchi 90+7'; Taisei Miyashiro (yellow card) 65'; Takuya Iwanami (yellow card) 87'	Stadium: Noevir Stadium Kobe; Attendance: 7,231; Referee: César Arturo Ramos (Mexico)

27 October Semi Final	Vissel Kobe (1)	2–1	(1) Kyoto Sanga	Kobe
	Taisei Miyashiro 18'; Daiju Sasaki 55'; Takuya Iwanami (yellow card) 38'	Report	Marco Túlio 32'; Rafael Elias (yellow card) 45'; Yuta Miyamoto (yellow card) 61'	Stadium: Noevir Stadium Kobe; Attendance: 14,980; Referee: Yuichi Nishimura

23 November Final	Gamba Osaka (1)	0–1	(1) Vissel Kobe	Shinjuku
14:00		Report	Miyashiro 64'	Stadium: Japan National Stadium; Attendance: 56,824; Referee: Yudai Yamamoto

=== Super Cup ===
17 February	Vissel Kobe	0–1	Kawasaki Frontale	Japan National Stadium
13:35 JST	Takahiro Ogihara (yellow card) 67'	Report	van Wermeskerken 48'; Shuto Tanabe (yellow card) 15'; Bafétimbi Gomis (yellow card) 25'; Kento Tachibanada (yellow card) 90+3'	Attendance: 52,142; Referee: Akihiko Ikeuchi

=== AFC Champions League ===
Pos	Team	Pld	W	D	L	GF	GA	GD	Pts	Qualification
3	(Malaysia) Johor Darul Ta'zim	7	4	2	1	16	8	+8	14	Advance to round of 16
4	(South Korea) Gwangju	7	4	2	1	15	9	+6	14	Advance to round of 16
5	(Japan) Vissel Kobe	7	4	1	2	14	9	+5	13	Advance to round of 16
6	(Thailand) Buriram United	8	3	3	2	7	12	−5	12	Advance to round of 16
7	(China) Shanghai Shenhua	8	3	1	4	13	12	+1	10	Advance to round of 16

Source: Asian Football Confederation
Rules for classification: 1) points; 2) goal difference; 3) number of goals scored; 4) number of matches won; 5) penalty shoot-out if only two teams remain tied and played each other on the final matchday 6) fair play ranking; 7) drawing of lots

==== Group stage ====
17 September 2024 Matchday 1	Buriram United (Thailand)	0–0	(Japan) Vissel Kobe	Buriram Stadium, Buriram
19:00 UTC+7	Dion Cools (yellow card) 90+2'	Report	Takahiro Ogihara (yellow card) 64'	Attendance: 16,793; Referee: Muhammad Taqi (Singapore)

2 October 2024 Matchday 2	Vissel Kobe (Japan)	Voided (2–1)	(China) Shandong Taishan	Kobe, Japan
	Taisei Miyashiro 14'; Gotoku Sakai 51'; Matheus Thuler (yellow card) 90+11'	Report	Cryzan 28' (yellow card) 13'; Valeri Qazaishvili (yellow card) 41'; Liao Lisheng (yellow card) 65'; Zhang Chi (yellow card) 81'; Gao Zhunyi (yellow card) 90+9'	Stadium: Noevir Stadium Kobe; Attendance: 6,045; Referee: Abdulrahman Al-Jassim (Qatar)

22 October 2024 Matchday 3	Ulsan HD (South Korea)	0–2	(Japan) Vissel Kobe	Ulsan, South Korea
	Yun Il-Lok (yellow card) 85'	Report	Taisei Miyashiro 48', 73'; Matheus Thuler (yellow card) 37'	Stadium: Ulsan Munsu Football Stadium; Attendance: 5,371; Referee: Alireza Faghani (Iran)

5 November 2024 Matchday 4	Vissel Kobe (Japan)	2–0	(South Korea) Gwangju FC	Kobe, Japan
	Taisei Miyashiro 45+3' (pen.) (yellow card) 61'; Daiju Sasaki 54'	Report	Jo Seong-Kwon (yellow card) 16'	Stadium: Noevir Stadium Kobe; Attendance: 6,567; Referee: Mohammed Al Hoaish (Saudi Arabia)

26 November 2024 Matchday 5	Vissel Kobe (Japan)	3–2	(Australia) Central Coast Mariners	Kobe, Japan
	Ryuho Kikuchi 40' (yellow card) 63'; Storm Roux 49' (o.g.); Daiju Sasaki 80'	Report	Hotaru Yamaguchi 54' (o.g.); Bailey Brandtman 74'; Brian Kaltack (yellow card) 61'	Stadium: Noevir Stadium Kobe; Referee: Omar Mohamed Al-Ali (United Arab Emirates)

3 December 2024 Matchday 6	Pohang Steelers (South Korea)	3–1	(Japan) Vissel Kobe	Pohang, South Korea
	Han Chan-hee 13'; Kim In-Sung 20'; Jeong Jae-hee 90+1'	Report	Sasaki 34'; Hotaru Yamaguchi (yellow card) 70'; Yuya Kuwasaki (yellow card) 80'	Stadium: Pohang Steel Yard; Referee: Alireza Faghani (Iran)

11 February 2025 Matchday 7	Vissel Kobe (Japan)	v	(China) Shanghai Port	Kobe, Japan
				Stadium: Noevir Stadium Kobe

18 February 2025 Matchday 8	Shanghai Shenhua (China)	v	(Japan) Vissel Kobe	Shanghai, China
				Stadium: Shanghai Stadium

== Team statistics ==
=== Appearances and goals ===
As of 8 Dec 2024

No.	Pos.	Player	J1 League		J.League Cup		Emperor's Cup		Super Cup		AFC Champions League Elite		Total	
No.	Pos.	Player	Apps.	Goals	Apps.	Goals	Apps.	Goals	Apps.	Goals	Apps.	Goals	Apps.	Goals
1	GK	(Japan) Daiya Maekawa	37	0	0	0	0	0	1	0	4	0	42	0
2	DF	(Japan) Nanasei Iino	2+12	0	1	0	5	0	0+1	0	3	0	24	0
3	DF	(Brazil) Matheus Thuler	36	2	0	0	1	0	1	0	3+1	0	42	2
4	DF	(Japan) Tetsushi Yamakawa	37	3	0+1	0	1+1	0	1	0	4	0	45	2
6	MF	(Japan) Takahiro Ogihara	34+1	1	0	0	2+1	0	1	0	2+1	0	42	1
7	MF	(Japan) Yosuke Ideguchi	20+7	0	2	0	3+2	0	0+1	0	4+2	0	41	0
9	FW	(Japan) Taisei Miyashiro	25+8	11	0+2	0	3+1	2	0+1	0	4+2	4	46	17
10	FW	(Japan) Yuya Osako	33+3	9	0	0	0+3	1	1	0	2	0	42	10
11	FW	(Japan) Yoshinori Muto	35+2	13	0	0	0+2	0	0	0	1+2	0	42	13
14	MF	(Japan) Koya Yuruki	4+6	1	1	0	1+1	0	0	0	3+3	0	19	1
15	DF	(Japan) Yuki Honda	15+10	1	1+1	0	3+1	0	0	0	4+1	0	36	1
16	MF	(Japan) Mitsuki Saito	0	0	0	0	0	0	0	0	0	0	0	0
17	MF	(Japan) Tatsunori Sakurai	0	0	1	0	0	0	0	0	0	0	1	0
18	MF	(Japan) Haruya Ide	15+5	1	1	1	0	0	1	0	0+2	0	24	2
19	DF	(Japan) Ryo Hatsuse	24+11	0	1+1	0	3	0	1	0	2+3	0	46	0
21	GK	(Japan) Shota Arai	1+1	0	1	0	3	0	0	0	1	0	7	0
22	MF	(Japan) Daiju Sasaki	16+18	4	0+1	1	5	3	1	0	5+1	3	47	11
23	DF	(Japan) Rikuto Hirose	17+10	1	0+1	0	2+2	0	0+1	0	2+2	0	37	1
24	DF	(Japan) (United States) Gōtoku Sakai	28+1	1	0	0	1+2	0	1	0	3	1	36	2
25	MF	(Japan) Yuya Kuwasaki	3+9	0	2	0	4	0	0	0	4+2	0	22	0
26	FW	(Brazil) Jean Patric	6+23	1	2	1	2+2	1	1	0	3+1	0	40	3
30	MF	(Japan) Kakeru Yamauchi	4+5	2	1+1	0	3+1	0	0	0	3+1	0	19	2
31	MF	(Japan) Yuya Nakasaka	0	0	1+1	0	0	0	0	0	0	0	2	0
33	DF	(Japan) (United States) Justin Homma	0	0	0+1	0	0	0	0	0	0	0	1	0
35	FW	(Japan) Niina Tominaga	0	0	0	0	0	0	0	0	0+3	0	3	0
37	DF	(Japan) Shogo Terasaka	0	0	1	0	0	0	0	0	0	0	1	0
38	MF	(Japan) Juzo Ura	0	0	1+1	0	0	0	0	0	0	0	2	0
39	GK	(Japan) Shioki Takayama	0	0	0	0	0	0	0	0	0	0	0	0
44	MF	(Japan) Mitsuki Hidaka	0	0	1+1	0	2	0	0	0	1+1	0	6	0
50	GK	(Japan) (Nigeria) Powell Obinna Obi	0	0	1	0	2	0	0	0	1	0	4	0
52	MF	(Japan) Kento Hamasaki	0	0	0	0	0+1	0	0	0	0	0	1	0
55	DF	(Japan) Takuya Iwanami	1+1	0	2	0	4	0	0	0	2	0	10	0
81	DF	(Japan) Ryuho Kikuchi	4+15	2	1	0	4+1	0	0	0	3	1	28	3
88	MF	(Japan) Ryota Morioka	0	0	0	0	0+1	0	0	0	0+1	0	2	0
96	MF	(Japan) Hotaru Yamaguchi	22+5	2	0	0	0+2	0	1	0	2	0	32	2

=== Clean sheets ===
The list is sorted by shirt number when total clean sheets are equal.

Rnk	No.	Player	J1	EC	JLC	AFC	Total
1	1	(Japan) Daiya Maekawa	6	0	0	0	6
TOTALS			6	0	0	0	6

Last updated: 19 May 2024.
Source: fbref.com
