= 2023 Vissel Kobe season =

Vissel Kobe
2023 season
- Chairman: Yuki Chifu
- Manager: Takayuki Yoshida
- Stadium: Noevir Stadium Kobe; Hyōgo-ku, Kōbe, Hyōgo
- J1 League: 1st (champions)
- Emperor's Cup: Quarter-finals
- J.League Cup: Group stage
- Top goalscorer: League: Yuya Osako (22); All: Yuya Osako (24)
- Highest home attendance: 27,630 vs Hokkaido Consadole Sapporo (1 July; J1 League)
- Lowest home attendance: 3,332 vs Nagano Parceiro (14 June; Emperor's Cup)
- Average home league attendance: 19,872
- Biggest win: 5–1 vs Kashima Antlers (15 April; J1 League); 4–0 vs Gamba Osaka (25 February; J1 League)
- Biggest defeat: 0–5 vs Sanfrecce Hiroshima (5 April; J.League Cup)
| Home colours | Away colours | Third colours |

The 2023 Vissel Kobe season was their 57th season in existence and the 8th consecutive season in the J1 League, since the club earned promotion back to it in 2013. In addition to the league, the club competed in the Emperor's Cup and the J. League Cup.

== Players ==
=== Current squad ===
All players that have been registered to play during the season.

Players' ages here are displayed in accordance with the opening of the J1 season, 18 February 2023.

| No. | Pos. | Nat. | Player | Date of birth (age) | Fully signed in | Signed from / Last club |
Goalkeepers
| 1 | GK | (Japan) | Daiya Maekawa | 8 September 1994 (aged 28) | 2017 | (Japan) Kansai University |
| 28 | GK | (Japan) | Yuya Tsuboi | 23 August 1999 (aged 23) | 2022 | (Japan) Chuo University |
| 32 | GK | (Japan) | Ryotaro Hironaga | 9 January 1990 (aged 33) | 2021 | (Japan) Sanfrecce Hiroshima |
| 40 | GK | (Japan) | Phelipe Megiolaro | 8 February 1999 (aged 24) | 2023 | (Brazil) Grêmio |
| – | GK | (Japan) | Taiga Kameda (T2) | 5 September 2007 (aged 15) | – | (Japan) Vissel Kobe U18 |
Defenders
| 2 | DF | (Japan) | Nanasei Iino | 2 October 1996 (aged 26) | 2022 | (Japan) Sagan Tosu |
| 3 | DF | (Brazil) | Matheus Thuler | 10 March 1999 (aged 23) | 2023 | (Brazil) Flamengo |
| 15 | DF | (Japan) | Yuki Honda | 2 January 1991 (aged 32) | 2023 | (Japan) Kyoto Sanga |
| 17 | DF | (Japan) | Ryuho Kikuchi | 9 December 1996 (aged 26) | 2020 | (Japan) Renofa Yamaguchi |
| 19 | DF | (Japan) | Ryo Hatsuse | 10 July 1997 (aged 25) | 2019 | (Japan) Gamba Osaka |
| 23 | DF | (Japan) | Tetsushi Yamakawa | 1 October 1997 (aged 25) | 2020 | (Japan) University of Tsukuba |
| 24 | DF | (Japan) | Gotoku Sakai | 14 March 1991 (aged 31) | 2019 | (Germany) Hamburger SV |
| 25 | DF | (Japan) | Leo Osaki | 8 July 1991 (aged 31) | 2018 | (Japan) Tokushima Vortis |
| 37 | DF | (Japan) | Shogo Terasaka | 6 June 2004 (aged 18) | 2023 | (Japan) Vissel Kobe U18 |
| 41 | DF | (Japan) | Shohei Takahashi | 27 October 1991 (aged 31) | On loan from 2023 | (Japan) Machida Zelvia |
| – | DF | (Japan) | Takuma Eguchi (T2) | 17 January 2007 (aged 16) | – | (Japan) Vissel Kobe U18 |
| – | DF | (Japan) | Justin Honma (T2) | 26 August 2005 (aged 17) | – | (Japan) Vissel Kobe U18 |
| – | DF | (Japan) | Kaito Yamada (T2) | 31 August 2006 (aged 16) | – | (Japan) Vissel Kobe U18 |
Midfielders
| 5 | MF | (Japan) | Hotaru Yamaguchi | 6 October 1990 (aged 32) | 2019 | (Japan) Cerezo Osaka |
| 14 | MF | (Japan) | Koya Yuruki | 3 July 1995 (aged 27) | 2022 | (Japan) Urawa Red Diamonds |
| 16 | MF | (Japan) | Mitsuki Saito | 10 January 1999 (aged 24) | On loan for 2023 | (Japan) Shonan Bellmare |
| 18 | MF | (Japan) | Haruya Ide | 25 March 1994 (aged 28) | 2023 | (Japan) Tokyo Verdy |
| 22 | MF | (Japan) | Daiju Sasaki | 17 September 1999 (aged 23) | 2018 | (Japan) Vissel Kobe U18 |
| 27 | MF | (Japan) | Toya Izumi | 2 December 2000 (aged 22) | 2023 | (Japan) Biwako Seikei Sport College |
| 31 | MF | (Japan) | Yuya Nakasaka | 5 August 1997 (aged 25) | 2016 | (Japan) Vissel Kobe U18 |
| 33 | MF | (Japan) | Takahiro Ogihara | 5 October 1991 (aged 31) | 2022 | (Japan) Yokohama F. Marinos |
| 34 | MF | (Japan) | Yusei Ozaki | 26 July 2003 (aged 19) | 2022 | (Japan) Vissel Kobe U18 |
| 36 | MF | (Japan) | Shuto Adachi | 15 July 2004 (aged 18) | 2023 | (Japan) Vissel Kobe U18 |
| 38 | MF | (Japan) | Juzo Ura | 21 May 2004 (aged 18) | 2023 | (Japan) Higashi Fukuoka High School |
| – | MF | (Japan) | Mitsuki Hidaka | 11 May 2003 (aged 19) | 2022 | (Japan) Aioi Gakuin High School |
| – | MF | (Japan) | Kakeru Yamauchi ^{(DSP)} | 6 January 2002 (aged 21) | 2024 | (Japan) University of Tsukuba |
Forward
| 10 | FW | (Japan) | Yuya Osako | 18 May 1990 (aged 32) | 2021 | (Germany) Werder Bremen |
| 11 | FW | (Japan) | Yoshinori Muto | 15 July 1992 (aged 30) | 2021 | (England) Newcastle |
| 21 | FW | (Japan) | Shuhei Kawasaki | 28 April 2001 (aged 21) | On loan for 2023 | (Portugal) Portimonense |
| 26 | FW | (Brazil) | Jean Patric | 14 May 1997 (aged 25) | 2023 | (Japan) Cerezo Osaka |
| 29 | FW | (Brazil) | Lincoln | 16 December 2000 (aged 22) | 2021 | (Brazil) Flamengo |
| 30 | FW | (Montenegro) | Stefan Mugoša | 26 February 1992 (aged 30) | 2022 | (South Korea) Incheon United |
| 35 | FW | (Japan) | Niina Tominaga | 18 July 2004 (aged 18) | 2023 | (Japan) Vissel Kobe U18 |

=== Out on loan ===
| No. | Pos. | Nat. | Player | Date of birth (age) | Joined on | On loan at |
|---|---|---|---|---|---|---|
| – | MF | (Japan) | Tatsunori Sakurai | 26 July 2002 (aged 20) | 2020 | (Japan) Tokushima Vortis |

=== Left mid-season ===
| No. | Pos. | Nat. | Player | Date of birth (age) | Transferred to | Transfer type |
|---|---|---|---|---|---|---|
| 8 | MF | (Spain) | Andrés Iniesta | 11 May 1984 (aged 38) | – | Contract expiration |

== Transfers ==
Transfers in
| Join on | Pos. | Player | Moving from | Transfer type |
|---|---|---|---|---|
| 5 Jun | MF | (Japan) Mitsuki Hidaka | (Spain) Atlético Paso | Loan return |
| 28 Apr | MF | (Japan) Kakeru Yamauchi | (Japan) University of Tsukuba | Loan transfer; 2023 DSP |
| 22 Mar | FW | (Brazil) Lincoln | (Brazil) Cruzeiro | Loan return |
| 16 Mar | DF | (Japan) Shohei Takahashi | (Japan) Machida Zelvia | Loan transfer |
| Pre-season | GK | (Brazil) Phelipe Megiolaro | (Brazil) Grêmio | Full transfer |
| Pre-season | DF | (Japan) Yuki Honda | (Japan) Kyoto Sanga | Full transfer |
| Pre-season | DF | (Brazil) Matheus Thuler | (Brazil) CR Flamengo | Full transfer; Loan made permanent |
| Pre-season | DF | (Japan) Shogo Terasaka | Vissel Kobe U18s | Promotion |
| Pre-season | MF | (Japan) Haruya Ide | (Japan) Tokyo Verdy | Full transfer |
| Pre-season | MF | (Japan) Toya Izumi | (Japan) Biwako Seikei; Sport College | Free transfer |
| Pre-season | MF | (Japan) Juzo Ura | (Japan) Higashi Fukuoka HS | Full transfer |
| Pre-season | MF | (Japan) Mitsuki Saito | (Japan) Shonan Bellmare | Loan transfer |
| Pre-season | MF | (Japan) Shuto Adachi | Vissel Kobe U18s | Promotion |
| Pre-season | FW | (Brazil) Jean Patric | (Japan) Cerezo Osaka | Full transfer |
| Pre-season | FW | (Japan) Shuhei Kawasaki | (Portugal) Portimonense | Loan transfer |
| Pre-season | FW | (Japan) Niina Tominaga | Vissel Kobe U18s | Promotion |

Transfers out
| Leave on | Pos. | Player | Moving to | Transfer type |
|---|---|---|---|---|
| 2 July | MF | (Spain) Andrés Iniesta | – | Contract expiration |
| Pre-season | GK | (Japan) Hiroki Iikura | (Japan) Yokohama F. Marinos | Full transfer |
| Pre-season | GK | (Japan) Genta Ito | (Japan) FC Imabari | Full transfer |
| Pre-season | DF | (Japan) Yuki Kobayashi ('00) | (Scotland) Celtic | Full transfer |
| Pre-season | DF | (Japan) Nagisa Sakurauchi | (Japan) FC Imabari | Full transfer |
| Pre-season | DF | (Japan) Tomoaki Makino | – | Retirement |
| Pre-season | MF | (Japan) Yuki Kobayashi ('92) | (Japan) Consadole Sapporo | Full transfer |
| Pre-season | MF | (Japan) Shion Inoue | (Japan) Yokohama FC | Full transfer |
| Pre-season | MF | (Japan) Yuta Goke | (Japan) Vegalta Sendai | Full transfer |
| Pre-season | FW | (Japan) Yutaro Oda | (Scotland) Heart of Midlothian | Full transfer |
| Pre-season | FW | (Japan) Noriaki Fujimoto | (Japan) Kagoshima United | Full transfer |
| Pre-season | FW | (Spain) Bojan Krkić | – | Retirement |

== Friendlies ==
| 4 February Training match | Vissel Kobe | 2–0 | (Japan) Matsumoto Yamaga | Kobe |
| 11:00 JST | Izumi 5'; Mugoša 42' | Report | | Stadium: Noevir Stadium Kobe |
Note: The match was played with two halves lasting 35 minutes each.

| 6 June International friendly match | Vissel Kobe | 0–2 | (Spain) Barcelona | Tokyo |
| 19:30 JST | | Report | Kessié 16'; García 19' | Stadium: Japan National Stadium; Attendance: 47,335; Referee: Jumpei Iida |

== Competitions ==
=== Overall record ===
| Competition | First match | Last match | Starting round | Final position | Record | | | | | | | |
| Competition | First match | Last match | Starting round | Final position | Pld | W | D | L | GF | GA | GD | Win % |
|---|---|---|---|---|---|---|---|---|---|---|---|---|
| J1 League | 34 February | -- | Matchday 1 | TBD | 34 | 21 | 8 | 5 | 60 | 29 | +31 | 61.76 |
| Emperor's Cup | 7 June | -- | Second round | TBD | 4 | 3 | 1 | 0 | 13 | 5 | +8 | 75.00 |
| J.League Cup | 8 March | -- | Group stage | Group stage | 6 | 2 | 0 | 4 | 4 | 12 | −8 | 33.33 |
| Total | | | | | 44 | 26 | 9 | 9 | 77 | 46 | +31 | 59.09 |

Source: Soccerway

=== J1 League ===
==== League table ====
| Pos | Team | Pld | W | D | L | GF | GA | GD | Pts | Qualification or relegation |
|---|---|---|---|---|---|---|---|---|---|---|
| 1 | Vissel Kobe (C) | 34 | 21 | 8 | 5 | 60 | 29 | +31 | 71 | Qualification for the AFC Champions League Elite league stage |
| 2 | Yokohama F. Marinos | 34 | 19 | 7 | 8 | 63 | 40 | +23 | 64 | Qualification for the AFC Champions League Elite league stage |
| 3 | Sanfrecce Hiroshima | 34 | 17 | 7 | 10 | 42 | 28 | +14 | 58 | Qualification for the AFC Champions League Two group stage |
| 4 | Urawa Red Diamonds | 34 | 15 | 12 | 7 | 42 | 27 | +15 | 57 | |
| 5 | Kashima Antlers | 34 | 14 | 10 | 10 | 43 | 34 | +9 | 52 | |

Source: JLeague.jp, J.League Data Site
Rules for classification: 1) Points; 2) Goal difference; 3) Goals scored; 4) Head-to-head points; 5) Head-to-head goal difference; 6) Head-to-head goals scored; 7) Fewer disciplinary points.
(C) Champions

==== Results summary ====
| Overall | | | | | | | | Home | | | | | | Away | | | | | |
| Pld | W | D | L | GF | GA | GD | Pts | W | D | L | GF | GA | GD | W | D | L | GF | GA | GD |
|---|---|---|---|---|---|---|---|---|---|---|---|---|---|---|---|---|---|---|---|
| 34 | 21 | 8 | 5 | 60 | 29 | +31 | 71 | 11 | 4 | 2 | 32 | 14 | +18 | 10 | 4 | 3 | 28 | 15 | +13 |

Last updated: 12 August 2023.
Source: Soccerway

==== Matches ====
The opening match was released by the J.League on 23 December 2022. The full league fixtures were released on 20 January 2023.

| 18 February 1 | Vissel Kobe | 1–0 | Avispa Fukuoka | Kobe |
| 14:00 JST | Jean Patric 70' (yellow card) 90+5' | Report | Nara (yellow card) 21'; Lukian (yellow card) 72' | Stadium: Noevir Stadium Kobe; Attendance: 18,981; Referee: Yoshiro Imamura |

| 25 February 2 | Hokkaido Consadole Sapporo | 1–3 | Vissel Kobe | Sapporo |
| 15:00 JST | Arano 39'; Kaneko 90+6' (pen.) | Report | Osako 9'; Sasaki 59'; Yamaguchi 89' | Stadium: Sapporo Dome; Attendance: 17,078; Referee: Koei Koya |

| 4 March 3 | Vissel Kobe | 4–0 | Gamba Osaka | Kobe |
| 14:00 JST | Osako 3'; Osaki (yellow card) 14'; Sakai 47', 73'; Muto 66' | Report | Egawa (yellow card) 13' | Stadium: Noevir Stadium Kobe; Attendance: 17,781; Referee: Masuya Ueda |

| 11 March 4 | Vissel Kobe | 0–1 | Urawa Red Diamonds | Kobe |
| 14:00 JST | Sakai (yellow card) 64' | Report | Ito 21'; Sekine (yellow card) 71' | Stadium: Noevir Stadium Kobe; Attendance: 21,223; Referee: Yuichi Nishimura |

| 18 March 5 | Sagan Tosu | 0–1 | Vissel Kobe | Tosu |
| 15:00 JST | Yamazaki (yellow card) 21' | Report | Izumi 22' | Stadium: Ekimae Real Estate Stadium; Attendance: 12,230; Referee: Hayato Shimizu |

| 1 April 6 | Kyoto Sanga | 0–3 | Vissel Kobe | Kyoto |
| 14:00 JST | Kinoshita (yellow card) 38'; Kaneko (yellow card) 43' | Report | Yuruki 55', 68'; Osako 80'; Osaki (yellow card) 90+6' | Stadium: Sanga Stadium by Kyocera; Attendance: 16,495; Referee: Futoshi Nakamura |

| 9 April 7 | Vissel Kobe | 0–0 | Albirex Niigata | Kobe |
| 14:00 JST | Yamaguchi (yellow card) 73'; Muto (yellow card) 73' | | Shimada (yellow card) 43'; Deng (yellow card) 69' | Stadium: Noevir Stadium Kobe; Attendance: 17,391; Referee: Hiroki Kasahara |

| 15 April 8 | Kashima Antlers | 1–5 | Vissel Kobe | Kashima |
| 16:00 JST | Shoji (yellow card) 60'; Suzuki 61' | Report | Osako 24', 48' (pen.) (yellow card) 40'; Hatsuse (yellow card) 31'; Muto 45+2', 85'; Sasaki 72'; Patric (yellow card) 87' | Stadium: Kashima Soccer Stadium; Attendance: 15,311; Referee: Akihiko Ikeuchi |

| 22 April 9 | Vissel Kobe | 2–3 | Yokohama F. Marinos | Kobe |
| 19:00 JST | Yuruki 19'; Osako 28'; Saito (yellow card) 31'; Yamaguchi (yellow card) 66' | Report | Anderson Lopes 33', 82'; Watanabe 45+2' | Stadium: Noevir Stadium Kobe; Attendance: 22,164; Referee: Yoshiro Imamura |

| 29 April 10 | Vissel Kobe | 2–0 | Shonan Bellmare | Kobe |
| 14:00 JST | Hatsuse 21'; Osaki (yellow card) 64'; Yamaguchi 80'; Ide (yellow card) 82' | Report | | Stadium: Noevir Stadium Kobe; Attendance: 17,390; Referee: Shu Kawamata |

| 3 May 11 | Nagoya Grampus | 2–2 | Vissel Kobe | Nagoya |
| 15:00 JST | Mateus (yellow card) 49'; Junker 73'; Fujii 90+8' | Report | Osako 11'; Ide (yellow card) 51'; Saito (yellow card) 53' (yellow-red card) 90+6'; Sasaki 60' | Stadium: Toyota Stadium; Attendance: 40,789; Referee: Yusuke Araki |

| 7 May 12 | Vissel Kobe | 3–0 | Yokohama FC | Kobe |
| 14:00 JST | Osako 45+1', 52'; Sasaki 54' | Report | Yoshino (yellow card) 19'; Saulo Mineiro (yellow card) 62' | Stadium: Noevir Stadium Kobe; Attendance: 20,005; Referee: Takafumi Mikuriya |

| 13 May 13 | Vissel Kobe | 2–0 | Sanfrecce Hiroshima | Kobe |
| 14:00 JST | Araki 47' (o.g.); Thuler (yellow card) 84'; Ide (yellow card) 89'; Muto 90+5' | Report | Shichi (yellow card) 28'; Araki (yellow card) 64'; Nakano (yellow card) 71' | Stadium: Noevir Stadium Kobe; Attendance: 15,741; Referee: Futoshi Nakamura |

| 20 May 14 | Kashiwa Reysol | 1–1 | Vissel Kobe | Kashiwa |
| 16:00 JST | Honda 66' (o.g.); Katayama (yellow card) 90+4' | Report | Osako 24'; Izumi (yellow card) 80' | Stadium: Sankyo Frontier Kashiwa Stadium; Attendance: 12,530; Referee: Hajime Matsuo |

| 27 May 15 | Vissel Kobe | 3–2 | FC Tokyo | Kobe |
| 14:00 JST | Muto 20', 44'; Osako 41' (yellow card) 55'; Jean Patric (yellow card) 87' | Report | Diego Oliveira 59' (pen.); Morishige (yellow card) 63'; Perotti 85' (pen.) | Stadium: Noevir Stadium Kobe; Attendance: 20,414; Referee: Hiroki Kasahara |

| 3 June 16 | Vissel Kobe | Postponed (Note: The fixture had to be postponed to the effect of Typhoon No.2 in public transportation within the Kansai region, which was partially suspended. Both clus would be unable to travel on both on the day before and on the day when the match was scheduled to happen. The rescheduled date is unconfirmed as of 3 June 2023.) | Kawasaki Frontale | Kobe |
| 14:00 JST | | | | Stadium: Noevir Stadium Kobe |

| 10 June 17 | Cerezo Osaka | 2–1 | Vissel Kobe | Osaka |
| 19:00 JST | Croux 50'; Kagawa (yellow card) 73'; Kitano 90+3' | Report | Sakai (yellow card) 28'; Yamaguchi 51'; Thuler (yellow card) 71'; Jean Patric (yellow card) 90+5' | Stadium: Yodoko Sakura Stadium; Attendance: 22,542; Referee: Yuichi Nishimura |

| 25 June 18 | Avispa Fukuoka | 0–3 | Vissel Kobe | Fukuoka |
| 19:00 JST | Yamagishi (yellow card) 50'; Nara (yellow card) 73'; Maejima (yellow card) 80' | Report | Osako 22'; Muto 60', 87' | Stadium: Best Denki Stadium; Attendance: 11,697; Referee: Yudai Yamamoto |

| 1 July 19 | Vissel Kobe | 1–1 | Hokkaido Consadole Sapporo | Kobe |
| 19:00 JST | Jean Patric (yellow card) 48'; Thuler 85' | Report | Supachok 26' | Stadium: Noevir Stadium Kobe; Attendance: 27,630; Referee: Khamis Al-Marri (Qatar) |

| 7 July 20 | Albirex Niigata | 0–1 | Vissel Kobe | Niigata |
| 19:00 JST | Hiroki Akiyama (yellow card) 74' | Report | Osako 15' | Stadium: Denka Big Swan Stadium; Attendance: 26,519; Referee: Koichiro Fukushima |

| 16 July 21 | Vissel Kobe | 2–1 | Sagan Tosu | Kobe |
| 19:00 JST | Osako 53'; Patric 82' | Report | Togashi 51' | Stadium: Noevir Stadium Kobe; Attendance: 19,893; Referee: Futoshi Nakamura |

| 22 July 16 | Vissel Kobe | 2–2 | Kawasaki Frontale | Kobe |
| 19:00 JST | Osako 59', 62' | Report | Wakizaka 23'; *Miyashiro 30' | Stadium: Noevir Stadium Kobe; Attendance: 15,986; Referee: Hiroyuki Kimura |

| 6 August 22 | Yokohama FC | 2–0 | Vissel Kobe | Yokohama |
| 18:30 JST | Inoue 23'; Yamashita 65' | Report | Matheus Thuler (yellow card) 57' | Stadium: Nippatsu Mitsuzawa Stadium; Attendance: 7,800; Referee: Hayato Shimizu |

| 12 August 23 | Kawasaki Frontale | 0–1 | Vissel Kobe | Kawasaki |
| 19:00 JST | Ominami (red card) 37' | Report | Osako 39'; Muto (yellow card) 54'; Osaki (yellow card) 90+6' | Stadium: Kawasaki Todoroki Stadium; Attendance: Yuichi Nishimura; Referee: 20,845 |

| 19 August 24 | Vissel Kobe | 1–1 | Kashiwa Reysol | Kobe |
| 19:00 JST | Osako 82'; Saito (yellow card) 18'; Hatsuse (yellow card) 72' | Report | Hosoya 45'; Inukai (yellow card) 90+2' | Stadium: Noevir Stadium Kobe; Attendance: 20,892; Referee: Yoshiro Imamura |

| 26 August 25 | FC Tokyo | 2–2 | Vissel Kobe | Tokyo |
| 19:00 JST | | | | Stadium: Ajinomoto Stadium |

| 2 September 26 | Vissel Kobe | 2–1 | Kyoto Sanga | Kobe |
| --:-- JST | | | | Stadium: Noevir Stadium Kobe |

| 15 September 27 | Sanfrecce Hiroshima | 2–0 | Vissel Kobe | Hiroshima |
| --:-- JST | | | | Stadium: Edion Stadium Hiroshima |

| 22 September 28 | Vissel Kobe | 1–0 | Cerezo Osaka | Kobe |
| --:-- JST | | | | Stadium: Noevir Stadium Kobe |

| 29 September 29 | Yokohama F. Marinos | 0–2 | Vissel Kobe | Yokohama |
| --:-- JST | | | | Stadium: Nissan Stadium |

| 20 October 30 | Vissel Kobe | 3–1 | Kashima Antlers | Kobe |
| --:-- JST | | | | Stadium: Noevir Stadium Kobe |

| 27 October 31 | Shonan Bellmare | 1–1 | Vissel Kobe | Hiratsuka |
| --:-- JST | | | | Stadium: Lemon Gas Stadium Hiratsuka |

| 10 November 32 | Urawa Red Diamonds | 1–2 | Vissel Kobe | Saitama |
| --:-- JST | | | | Stadium: Saitama Stadium 2002 |

| 24 November 33 | Vissel Kobe | 2–1 | Nagoya Grampus | Kobe |
| --:-- JST | | | | Stadium: Noevir Stadium Kobe |

| 2 December 34 | Gamba Osaka | 0–1 | Vissel Kobe | Suita |
| --:-- JST | | | | Stadium: Panasonic Stadium Suita |

=== Emperor's Cup ===
As Vissel is a J1 club, it started the competition on the second round.

| 14 June Second round | Vissel Kobe | 3–1 | Nagano Parceiro | Kobe |
| 19:00 | Lincoln 12', 29'; Yuruki 64' | Report | Nishimura 45+1' | Stadium: Noevir Stadium Kobe; Attendance: 3,332; Referee: Hayato Shimizu |

| 12 July Third round | Vissel Kobe | 5–2 | Júbilo Iwata | Iwata |
| 19:00 JST | Saito 13'; Kawasaki 24', 66'; Yuruki 30'; Sasaki 39' | Report; Report | Funahashi 61'; Furukawa 81' | Stadium: Yamaha Stadium; Attendance: 3,840; Referee: Yoshiro Imamura |

| 2 August Round of 16 | Ventforet Kofu | 1–4 | Vissel Kobe | Kōfu |
| 19:03 JST | Miyazaki 20' | Report; Report | Mancha 52' (o.g.); Muto 59'; Osako 78'; Jean Patric 86' | Stadium: JIT Recycle Ink Stadium; Attendance: 7,467; Referee: Hajime Matsuo |

| 30 August Quarter-finals | Roasso Kumamoto | 1–1 (a.e.t.) (4–3 p) | Vissel Kobe | Kumamoto |
| 19:00 JST | Hirakawa 60' | Report; Report | Jean Patric 87' | Stadium: Egao Kenkō Stadium; Attendance: 10,512; Referee: Takafumi Mikuriya |
| | Penalties |
| | Kuroki (penalty scored); Higashiyama (penalty missed); Tashiro (penalty scored); Aihara (penalty scored); Hirakawa (penalty scored) | | (penalty scored) Osako; (penalty missed) Muto; (penalty scored) Yamaguchi; (penalty missed) Osaki; (penalty scored) Ide |

=== J.League Cup ===
The club started the competition at the group stage.

| Pos | Team | Pld | W | D | L | GF | GA | GD | Pts | Qualification |
|---|---|---|---|---|---|---|---|---|---|---|
| 1 | Nagoya Grampus | 6 | 5 | 0 | 1 | 11 | 5 | +6 | 15 | Advance to knockout stage |
| 2 | Sanfrecce Hiroshima | 6 | 3 | 0 | 3 | 12 | 7 | +5 | 9 | |
| 3 | Yokohama FC | 6 | 2 | 0 | 4 | 7 | 10 | −3 | 6 (Note: Head-to-head points: Yokohama FC 3, Vissel Kobe 3. Head-to-head goal differences: Yokohama FC +1, Vissel Kobe –1.) | |
| 4 | Vissel Kobe | 6 | 2 | 0 | 4 | 4 | 12 | −8 | 6 | |

Source: JLeague.co (EN), JLeague.jp (JA)
Rules for classification: Tiebreakers
Notes:

| 8 March | Vissel Kobe | 0–2 | Nagoya Grampus | Kobe |
| 19:03 | Hatsuse (yellow card) 47'; Sasaki (yellow card) 59' | Report | Sakai 23', 75' | Stadium: Noevir Stadium Kobe; Attendance: 4,084; Referee: Yusuke Araki |

| 26 March | Yokohama FC | 0–1 | Vissel Kobe | Yokohama |
| 14:03 | Hashimoto (yellow card) 55'; Yuri (yellow card) 70'; Mateus (yellow card) 90+4' | Report | Osako 85' | Stadium: Nippatsu Mitsuzawa Stadium; Attendance: 3,813; Referee: Yoshiro Imamura |

| 5 April | Vissel Kobe | 0–5 | Sanfrecce Hiroshima | Kobe |
| 19:03 | Izumi (yellow card) 40' | Report | Sasaki 31'; Mitsuta 53', 70'; Kawamura 60'; Yamasaki 87' | Stadium: Noevir Stadium Kobe; Attendance: 4,434; Referee: Koei Koya |

| 19 April | Sanfrecce Hiroshima | 2–1 | Vissel Kobe | Hiroshima |
| 19:03 | Shichi (yellow card) 63'; Sasaki 73'; Nakano 82' | Report | Thuler (yellow card) 13'; Lincoln 69' (pen.) (yellow card) 86'; Saito (yellow card) 83'; Osaki (yellow card) 90+5' | Stadium: Edion Stadium Hiroshima; Attendance: 5,877; Referee: Jumpei Iida |

| 24 May | Nagoya Grampus | 0–1 | Vissel Kobe | Toyota |
| 19:33 | | Report | Samper (yellow card) 41'; Lincoln 64' | Stadium: Toyota Stadium; Attendance: 6,266; Referee: Masuya Ueda |

| 18 June | Vissel Kobe | 1–2 | Yokohama FC | Kobe |
| 18:03 | Ozaki (red card) 3'; Jean Patric 8' | Report | Yamashita 20', 30'; Marcelo Ryan 73' | Stadium: Noevir Stadium Kobe; Attendance: 5,430; Referee: Yusuke Araki |

== Statistics ==
=== Appearances and goals ===
As of 29 September 2023

| No. | Pos | Nat | Player | Total | | J1 League | | Emperor's Cup | | J.League Cup | |
| No. | Pos | Nat | Player | Apps | Goals | Apps | Goals | Apps | Goals | Apps | Goals |
Goalkeepers
| 1 | GK | (Japan) JPN | Daiya Maekawa | 34 | 0 | 29 | 0 | 4 | 0 | 1 | 0 |
| 28 | GK | (Japan) JPN | Yuya Tsuboi | 3 | 0 | 0 | 0 | 0 | 0 | 3 | 0 |
| 40 | GK | (Brazil) BRA | Phelipe Megiolaro | 2 | 0 | 0 | 0 | 0 | 0 | 2 | 0 |
Defenders
| 2 | DF | (Japan) JPN | Nanasei Iino | 20 | 0 | 3+12 | 0 | 1+2 | 0 | 1+1 | 0 |
| 3 | DF | (Brazil) BRA | Matheus Thuler | 25 | 1 | 14+8 | 1 | 2 | 0 | 1 | 0 |
| 15 | DF | (Japan) JPN | Yuki Honda | 32 | 0 | 24+3 | 0 | 3+1 | 0 | 1 | 0 |
| 17 | DF | (Japan) JPN | Ryuho Kikuchi | 2 | 0 | 1+1 | 0 | 0 | 0 | 0 | 0 |
| 19 | DF | (Japan) JPN | Ryo Hatsuse | 35 | 1 | 29 | 1 | 4 | 0 | 2 | 0 |
| 23 | DF | (Japan) JPN | Tetsushi Yamakawa | 25 | 0 | 20+1 | 0 | 0+1 | 0 | 1+2 | 0 |
| 24 | DF | (Japan) JPN | Gotoku Sakai | 28 | 2 | 24 | 2 | 3 | 0 | 1 | 0 |
| 25 | DF | (Japan) JPN | Leo Osaki | 27 | 0 | 9+11 | 0 | 2+2 | 0 | 2+1 | 0 |
| 37 | DF | (Japan) JPN | Shogo Terasaka | 5 | 0 | 0 | 0 | 0 | 0 | 5 | 0 |
| 41 | DF | (Japan) JPN | Shohei Takahashi | 6 | 0 | 0 | 0 | 0+1 | 0 | 5 | 0 |
| 51 | DF | (Japan) JPN | Justin Homma | 1 | 0 | 0 | 0 | 0 | 0 | 0+1 | 0 |
Midfielders
| 5 | MF | (Japan) JPN | Hotaru Yamaguchi | 34 | 4 | 29 | 4 | 3 | 0 | 0+2 | 0 |
| 6 | MF | (Hungary) HUN | Bálint Vécsei | 2 | 0 | 0+2 | 0 | 0 | 0 | 0 | 0 |
| 14 | MF | (Japan) JPN | Koya Yuruki | 33 | 5 | 24+3 | 3 | 4 | 2 | 1+1 | 0 |
| 16 | MF | (Japan) JPN | Mitsuki Saito | 28 | 1 | 22 | 0 | 3 | 1 | 1+2 | 0 |
| 18 | MF | (Japan) JPN | Haruya Ide | 18 | 0 | 9+4 | 0 | 0+2 | 0 | 2+1 | 0 |
| 20 | MF | (Japan) JPN | Mizuki Arai | 3 | 0 | 0+3 | 0 | 0 | 0 | 0 | 0 |
| 22 | MF | (Japan) JPN | Daiju Sasaki | 36 | 6 | 17+11 | 5 | 4 | 1 | 3+1 | 0 |
| 27 | MF | (Japan) JPN | Toya Izumi | 14 | 1 | 1+7 | 1 | 0 | 0 | 6 | 0 |
| 31 | MF | (Japan) JPN | Yuya Nakasaka | 5 | 0 | 0 | 0 | 0 | 0 | 4+1 | 0 |
| 33 | MF | (Japan) JPN | Takahiro Ogihara | 13 | 0 | 2+4 | 0 | 1+2 | 0 | 4 | 0 |
| 34 | MF | (Japan) JPN | Yusei Ozaki | 9 | 0 | 0+2 | 0 | 1+1 | 0 | 5 | 0 |
| 36 | MF | (Japan) JPN | Shuto Adachi | 4 | 0 | 0 | 0 | 0 | 0 | 2+2 | 0 |
| 38 | MF | (Japan) JPN | Juzo Ura | 2 | 0 | 0 | 0 | 0 | 0 | 0+2 | 0 |
| 44 | MF | (Japan) JPN | Mitsuki Hidaka | 1 | 0 | 0+1 | 0 | 0 | 0 | 0 | 0 |
| 64 | MF | (Spain) ESP | Juan Mata | 1 | 0 | 0+1 | 0 | 0 | 0 | 0 | 0 |
Forwards
| 10 | FW | (Japan) JPN | Yuya Osako | 34 | 22 | 27+2 | 20 | 0+4 | 1 | 0+1 | 1 |
| 11 | FW | (Japan) JPN | Yoshinori Muto | 34 | 10 | 28+1 | 9 | 0+4 | 1 | 0+1 | 0 |
| 21 | FW | (Japan) JPN | Shuhei Kawasaki | 13 | 3 | 2+2 | 1 | 3+1 | 2 | 2+3 | 0 |
| 26 | FW | (Brazil) BRA | Jean Patric | 29 | 6 | 4+18 | 3 | 4 | 2 | 3 | 1 |
| 29 | FW | (Brazil) BRA | Lincoln | 10 | 4 | 0+5 | 0 | 1 | 2 | 4 | 2 |
| 35 | FW | (Japan) JPN | Niina Tominaga | 3 | 0 | 0 | 0 | 0 | 0 | 1+2 | 0 |
Players loaned or transferred out during the season
| 6 | MF | (Spain) ESP | Sergi Samper | 4 | 0 | 0 | 0 | 1 | 0 | 2+1 | 0 |
| 8 | MF | (Spain) ESP | Andrés Iniesta | 6 | 0 | 1+3 | 0 | 0 | 0 | 0+2 | 0 |
| 30 | FW | (Montenegro) MNE | Stefan Mugoša | 4 | 0 | 0+1 | 0 | 0 | 0 | 1+2 | 0 |
