= Justin Homma =

Japanese footballer (born 2005)

Justin Homma 本間 ジャスティン
Personal information
- Date of birth: 26 August 2005 (age 21)
- Place of birth: Osaka, Japan
- Height: 1.81 m (5 ft 11 in)
- Position: Full-back

Team information
- Current team: Vissel Kobe
- Number: 42

Youth career
- 2013–2017: Kadoma Kitakaze SC
- 2018–2020: Gamba Osaka Kadoma
- 2021–2023: Vissel Kobe

Senior career*
Years	Team	Apps	(Gls)
2023–	Vissel Kobe	0	(0)
2024	→ Yokohama F. Marinos (loan)	0	(0)
2025	→ Matsumoto Yamaga FC (loan)	3	(0)

International career
2022	Japan U17		
2023–	Japan U19	1	(0)
- * Club domestic league appearances and goals as of 09:47, 27 April 2026 (UTC)

Justin Homma (本間 ジャスティン, Honma Jasutin; born 26 August 2005) is a Japanese footballer currently playing as a full-back for J1 League club Vissel Kobe.

== Club career ==
Homma began his career with Kadoma Kitakaze SC and the Gamba Osaka affiliate team in Kadoma, before joining the academy of J1 League side Vissel Kobe. He was invited to train for the first team in January 2023. On 24 May, he made his professional debut in a 1–0 J.League Cup win over Nagoya Grampus, coming on as a substitute for Jean Patric.

On 23 August 2024, Homma joined Yokohama F. Marinos on a season-long loan deal.

In December 2024, it was announced that Homma would join J3 League club Matsumoto Yamaga FC on loan for the 2025 season.

== International career ==
Having already represented Japan at under-17 level, Homma was called up to the under-19 team for the 2023 Maurice Revello Tournament.

== Personal life ==
Homma is of American descent.

Vissel fans seem to think that Homma shares a slight resemblance with Vissel Kobe teammate and Japanese international footballer, Gōtoku Sakai.

== Honours ==
Vissel Kobe

- J1 100 Year Vision League: 2026

== Career statistics ==
As of 27 April 2026

Appearances and goals by club, season and competition
Club	Season	League			National Cup		League Cup		Other		Total	
Club	Season	Division	Apps	Goals	Apps	Goals	Apps	Goals	Apps	Goals	Apps	Goals
Japan			League		Emperor's Cup		J. League Cup		Other		Total	
Vissel Kobe	2023	J1 League	0	0	0	0	1	0	–		1	0
Vissel Kobe	2024	J1 League	0	0	0	0	1	0	–		1	0
Vissel Kobe	Total		0	0	0	0	2	0	0	0	2	0
Yokohama F. Marinos (loan)	2024	J1 League	0	0	0	0	0	0	–		0	0
Matsumoto Yamaga FC (loan)	2025	J3 League	3	0	2	0	2	0	–		7	0
Career total			3	0	2	0	4	0	0	0	9	0
