= Powell Obinna Obi =

Japanese footballer

Powell Obinna Obi オビ パウエル オビンナ
Personal information
- Full name: Powell Obinna Obi
- Date of birth: 18 December 1997 (age 28)
- Place of birth: Saitama, Japan
- Height: 1.93 m (6 ft 4 in)
- Position: Goalkeeper

Team information
- Current team: Avispa Fukuoka
- Number: 99

Youth career
- Higashi-Omiya Cosmos SSS
- 2008–2009: Omiya Ardija
- 2010–2015: JFA Academy Fukushima

College career
Years	Team	Apps	(Gls)
2016–2019	Ryutsu Keizai University		

Senior career*
Years	Team	Apps	(Gls)
2019–2023	Yokohama F. Marinos	9	(0)
2020–2021	→ Tochigi SC (loan)	31	(0)
2024–2025	Vissel Kobe	0	(0)
2026–	Avispa Fukuoka	2	(0)

International career^{‡}
2012	Japan U16		
2013–2014	Japan U17	5	(0)
2017	Japan U20	2	(0)
2018–2020	Japan U23	8	(0)
- * Club domestic league appearances and goals as of 10:26, 29 April 2026 (UTC) ‡ National team caps and goals as of 15 June 2019, 14:22 (UTC)

Powell Obinna Obi (オビ パウエル オビンナ, Obi Paueru Obinna; born 18 December 1997) is a Japanese footballer who plays as a goalkeeper for J1 League club Avispa Fukuoka.

== Career statistics ==
=== Club ===
As of 29 April 2026

Appearances and goals by club, season and competition
Club	Season	League			National cup (Note: Includes Emperors Cup)		League cup (Note: Includes J.League Cup)		Continental		Other		Total	
Club	Season	Division	Apps	Goals	Apps	Goals	Apps	Goals	Apps	Goals	Apps	Goals	Apps	Goals
Ryutsu Keizai University	2019	–			1	0	–		–		–		1	0
Yokohama F. Marinos	2019	J1 League	0	0	0	0	0	0	0	0	0	0	0	0
Yokohama F. Marinos	2020	J1 League	2	0	0	0	0	0	4 (Note: Appearances in AFC Champions League Elite)	0	0	0	6	0
Yokohama F. Marinos	2021	J1 League	5	0	0	0	0	0	0	0	0	0	5	0
Yokohama F. Marinos	2022	J1 League	0	0	2	0	1	0	0	0	0	0	3	0
Yokohama F. Marinos	2023	J1 League	2	0	2	0	1	0	0	0	1 (Note: Appearance in Japanese Super Cup)	0	6	0
Yokohama F. Marinos	Total		9	0	4	0	2	0	4	0	1	0	20	0
Tochigi City (loan)	2020	J2 League	9	0	0	0	–		–		–		9	0
Tochigi City (loan)	2021	J2 League	22	0	0	0	–		–		–		22	0
Tochigi City (loan)	Total		31	0	0	0	0	0	0	0	0	0	31	0
Vissel Kobe	2024	J1 League	0	0	2	0	1	0	1	0	–		4	0
Vissel Kobe	2025	J1 League	0	0	0	0	1	0	1	0	–		2	0
Vissel Kobe	Total		0	0	2	0	2	0	2	0	0	0	6	0
Avispa Fukuoka	2026	J1 (100)	2	0	–		–		–		–		2	0
Career total			42	0	7	0	4	0	6	0	1	0	60	0

== Honours ==
=== Club ===
Vissel Kobe

- J1 League: 2024
