= Yoshinori Muto =

Japanese footballer (born 1992)

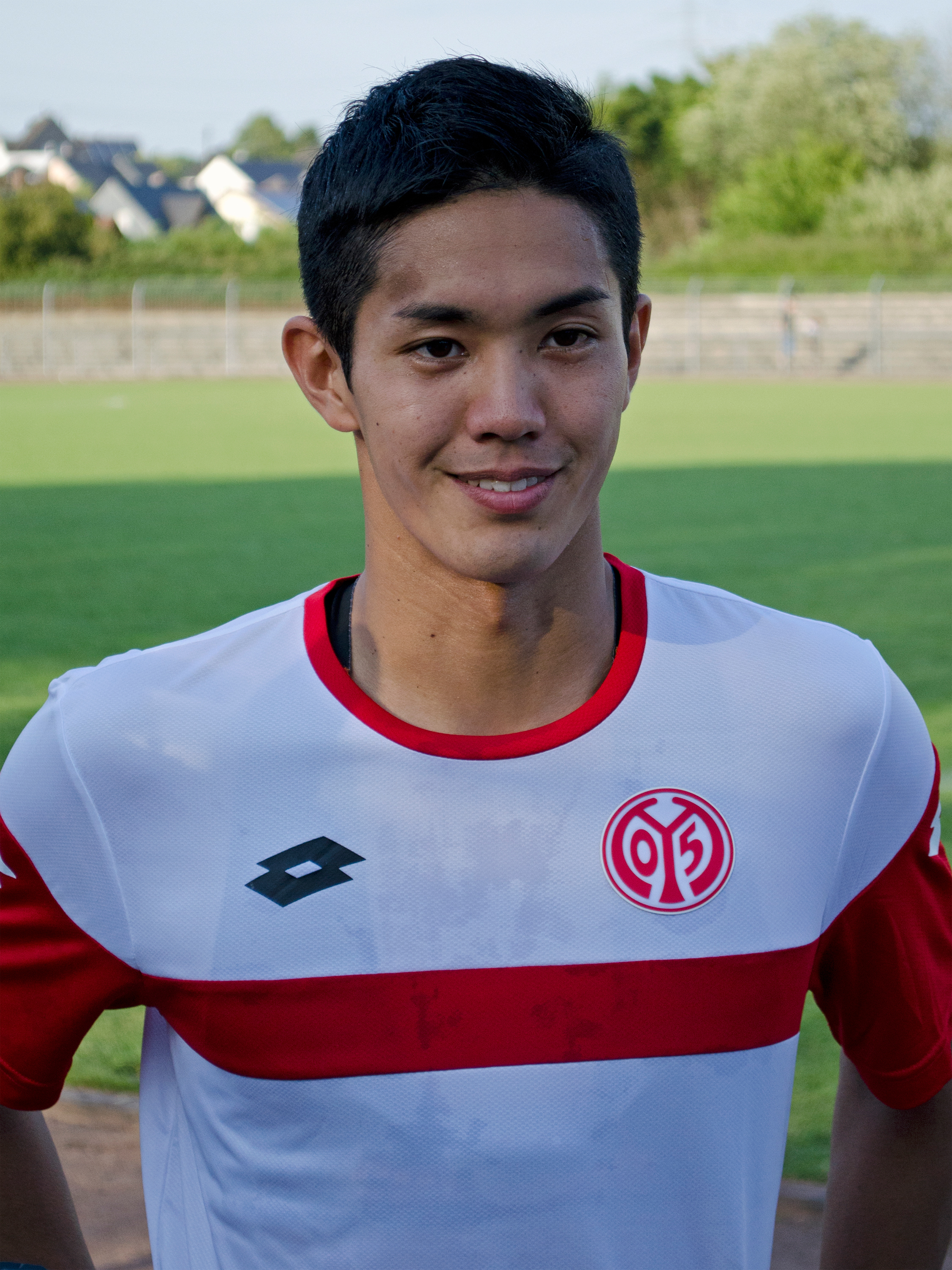
- Muto With Mainz 05

Personal information
- Full name: Yoshinori Muto
- Date of birth: 15 July 1992 (age 34)
- Place of birth: Setagaya, Tokyo, Japan
- Height: 1.79 m (5 ft 10 in)
- Positions: Forward; winger

Team information
- Current team: Vissel Kobe
- Number: 11

Youth career
- 1996–2004: Buddy SC
- 2005–2010: FC Tokyo

College career
Years	Team	Apps	(Gls)
2011–2013	Keio University		

Senior career*
Years	Team	Apps	(Gls)
2013–2015	FC Tokyo	51	(23)
2015–2018	Mainz 05	66	(20)
2018–2021	Newcastle United	25	(1)
2020–2021	→ Eibar (loan)	26	(1)
2021–	Vissel Kobe	146	(39)

International career^{‡}
2014–2019	Japan	29	(3)
Medal record
Representing Japan
AFC Asian Cup
Silver medal – second place	2019 United Arab Emirates
- * Club domestic league appearances and goals as of 10 August 2026 ‡ National team caps and goals as of 1 February 2019

Yoshinori Muto (武藤 嘉紀, Mutō Yoshinori; born 15 July 1992) is a Japanese professional footballer who plays as a forward or a winger for Vissel Kobe.

Muto started his career with J1 League club FC Tokyo in 2013 who he played with for three seasons. In May 2015, he signed for German club Mainz 05 where he amassed 72 appearances and scored 23 goals before moving to Premier League club Newcastle United in August 2018.

== Club career ==
=== FC Tokyo ===
As a child, Muto joined FC Tokyo's youth system, where he kept developing until 2010. He then enrolled in the Faculty of Economics of Keio University but kept playing football, for Keio's team. Despite an injury which sidelined him, in his first season with Keio he won the "Rookie of the Year" title.

In 2012 and 2013, FC Tokyo included him in their roster as a "Special Designated Player", an option that allows J-League clubs to field university players without a professional contract. However, he got on the pitch just once, at the end of a match in July 2013.

In 2014, he signed his first professional contract with FC Tokyo and was given the shirt number 14. Coach Massimo Ficcadenti decided to use him from the first league round and, at the end of the season, Muto reached 33 appearances and scored 13 goals, matching the top debut record in the Japanese first division. At the end of the season, he was part of the J-League's Best XI.

Muto graduated from Keio University in March 2015, and the following month was subject to a bid by Chelsea. In April, he was elected as March's MVP (Player of the Month) in the J-League.

=== Mainz 05 ===
On 30 May 2015, Muto joined Bundesliga club Mainz 05 on a four-year contract until 2019. On 31 October 2015, he scored a hat-trick for the first time in his career and also became the second Japanese player after Naohiro Takahara to score a hat-trick in the Bundesliga, in his team's 3–3 draw against FC Augsburg.

=== Newcastle United ===
Premier League club Newcastle United announced on 27 July 2018 that they had reached a deal to sign Muto, pending him being granted a UK work permit. He was granted the work permit on 2 August, officially becoming a Newcastle player on a four-year contract as part of a £9.5 million fee. Muto's first goal for Newcastle came in a 3–2 away loss to Manchester United at Old Trafford.

==== Eibar (loan) ====
On 16 September 2020, Muto was loaned out to Spanish club Eibar for the 2020–21 season.

=== Vissel Kobe ===
On 7 August 2021, Vissel Kobe announced that they signed Muto.

== International career ==
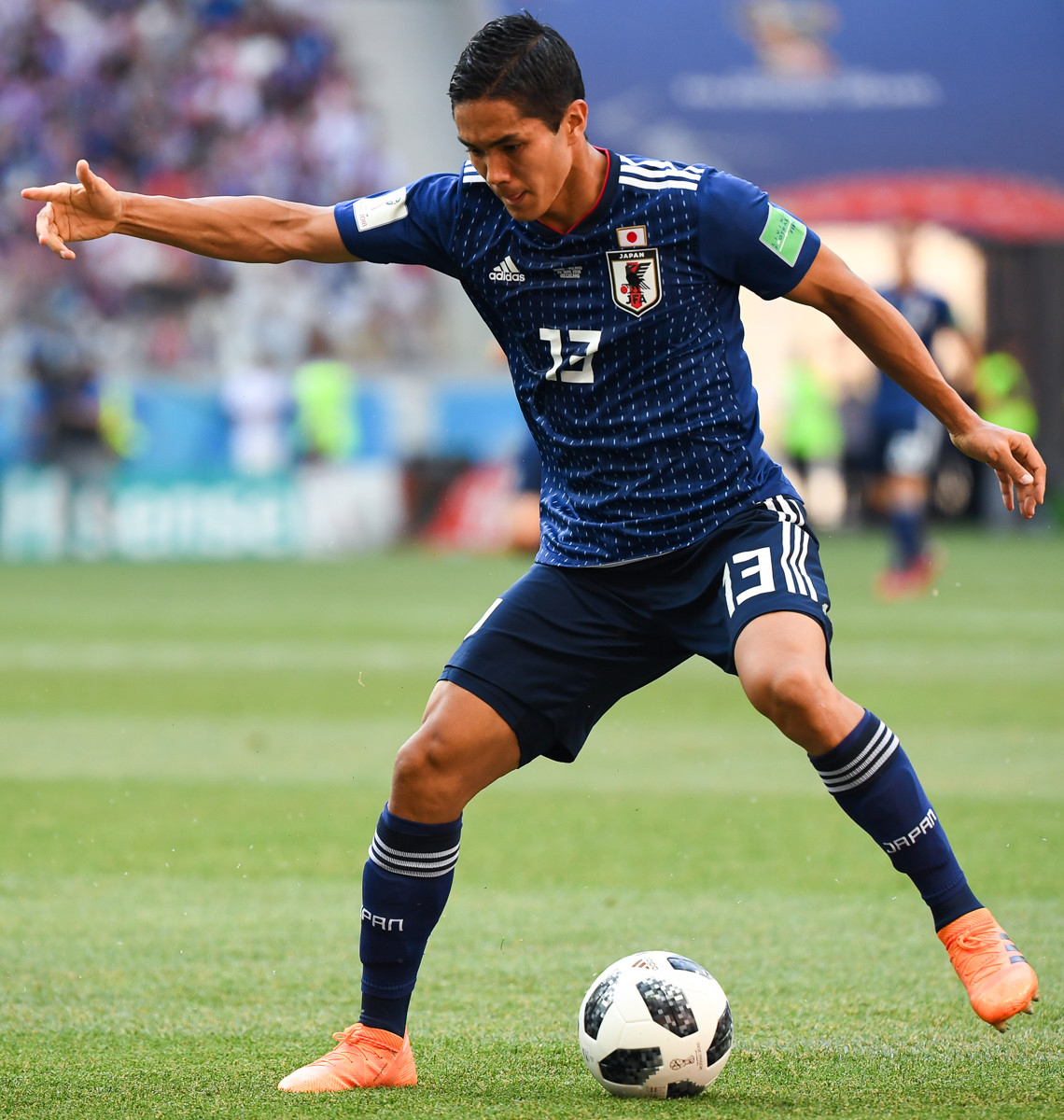
Muto playing for Japan during the 2018 FIFA World Cup

Muto made his debut for Japan on 5 September 2014 in a 2–0 friendly defeat to Uruguay at the Sapporo Dome, replacing Yusuke Minagawa after 58 minutes. Four days later at Yokohama's Nissan Stadium he scored his first international goal, coming on as a half-time substitute against Venezuela and scoring the first goal of a 2–2 draw six minutes later.

As a substitute, Muto played all of Japan's matches at the 2015 AFC Asian Cup in Australia, ending with defeat to the United Arab Emirates in the quarter-finals.

On 31 May 2018, he was named in Japan's final 23-man squad for the 2018 FIFA World Cup in Russia.

On 20 December 2018 he has been called up for the 2019 Asian Cup replacing the injured Takuma Asano.

== Career statistics ==
=== Club ===
As of match played 20 April 2026

Appearances and goals by club, season and competition
Club	Season	League			National cup (Note: Includes DFB-Pokal, FA Cup, Copa del Rey, Emperor's Cup)		League cup (Note: Includes J.League Cup, EFL Cup)		Continental		Other		Total	
Club	Season	Division	Apps	Goals	Apps	Goals	Apps	Goals	Apps	Goals	Apps	Goals	Apps	Goals
FC Tokyo	2013	J1 League	1	0	0	0	0	0	—		—		1	0
FC Tokyo	2014	J1 League	33	13	0	0	5	1	—		—		38	14
FC Tokyo	2015	J1 League	17	10	—		4	2	—		—		21	12
FC Tokyo	Total		51	23	0	0	9	3	—		—		60	26
Mainz 05	2015–16	Bundesliga	20	7	1	0	—		—		—		21	7
Mainz 05	2016–17	Bundesliga	19	5	0	0	—		2 (Note: Appearances in UEFA Europa League)	1	—		21	6
Mainz 05	2017–18	Bundesliga	27	8	3	2	—		—		—		30	10
Mainz 05	Total		66	20	4	2	—		2	1	—		72	23
Newcastle United	2018–19	Premier League	17	1	0	0	1	0	—		—		18	1
Newcastle United	2019–20	Premier League	8	0	1	0	1	1	—		—		10	1
Newcastle United	Total		25	1	1	0	2	1	—		—		28	2
SD Eibar (loan)	2020–21	La Liga	26	1	2	2	—		—		—		28	3
Vissel Kobe	2021	J1 League	14	5	—		—		—		—		14	5
Vissel Kobe	2022	J1 League	26	6	2	0	—		3 (Note: Appearances in AFC Champions League)	1	—		31	7
Vissel Kobe	2023	J1 League	34	10	4	1	1	0	—		—		39	11
Vissel Kobe	2024	J1 League	37	13	3	0	0	0	5 (Note: Appearances in AFC Champions League Elite)	1	—		45	14
Vissel Kobe	2025	J1 League	19	1	2	0	1	0	8	4	1 (Note: Appearance in Japanese Super Cup)	0	31	5
Vissel Kobe	2026	J1 League	6	3	0	0	0	0	0	0	—		6	3
Vissel Kobe	Total		136	38	11	1	2	0	16	6	1	0	166	45
Career total			303	83	18	5	13	4	18	7	1	0	353	99

=== International ===
As of match played 28 June 2018

Appearances and goals by national team and year
National team	Year	Apps	Goals
Japan	2014	6	1
Japan	2015	12	1
Japan	2016	1	0
Japan	2017	2	0
Japan	2018	4	0
Japan	2019	4	1
Total		29	3

As of match played 17 January 2019
Scores and results list Japan's goal tally first, score column indicates score after each Muto goal.

List of international goals scored by Yoshinori Muto
No.	Date	Venue	Cap	Opponent	Score	Result	Competition
1	9 September 2014	Nissan Stadium, Yokohama, Japan	2	Venezuela	1–0	2–2	Friendly
2	13 October 2015	Azadi Stadium, Tehran, Iran	17	Iran	1–1	1–1	Friendly
3	17 January 2019	Khalifa bin Zayed Stadium, Al Ain, United Arab Emirates	27	Uzbekistan	1–1	2–1	2019 AFC Asian Cup

== Honours ==
=== Club ===
Vissel Kobe

- J1 League: 2023, 2024
- J1 100 Year Vision League: 2026
- Emperor's Cup: 2024

=== Individual ===
- J.League Player of the Year: 2024
- J.League Best XI: 2023, 2024

== Family ==
- Shu Watanabe (father-in-law)
