= Yuya Nakasaka =

Japanese footballer

Yuya Nakasaka 中坂勇哉
Personal information
- Full name: Yuya Nakasaka
- Date of birth: 8 May 1997 (age 29)
- Place of birth: Tokushima, Tokushima, Japan
- Height: 1.71 m (5 ft 7 in)
- Positions: Attacking midfielder; winger

Youth career
- 2003–2009: Tamiya Victory SS
- 2010–2015: Vissel Kobe

Senior career*
Years	Team	Apps	(Gls)
2016–2024	Vissel Kobe	65	(6)
2018	→ Peralada (loan)	4	(0)
2019	→ Kyoto Sanga (loan)	7	(1)
2025	Basara Hyogo	14	(1)
- * Club domestic league appearances and goals as of 13:37, 20 October 2026 (UTC)

Yuya Nakasaka (中坂勇哉, Nakasaka, Yuya; born 8 May 1997) is a Japanese footballer who plays as an attacking midfielder or a winger.

== Club statistics ==
As of 20 October 2026.

Appearances and goals by club, season and competition
Club	Season	League			National cup (Note: Includes Emperor's Cup)		League cup (Note: Includes J.League Cup)		Continental		Other		Total	
Club	Season	Division	Apps	Goals	Apps	Goals	Apps	Goals	Apps	Goals	Apps	Goals	Apps	Goals
Vissel Kobe	2016	J1 League	12	1	3	1	5	2	0	0	0	0	20	4
Vissel Kobe	2017	J1 League	14	2	3	0	7	3	0	0	0	0	24	5
Vissel Kobe	2018	J1 League	0	0	2	0	4	0	0	0	0	0	6	0
Vissel Kobe	2019	J1 League	1	0	1	0	2	0	0	0	0	0	4	0
Vissel Kobe	2020	J1 League	2	0	0	0	0	0	1 (Note: Appearances in AFC Champions League Elite)	0	0	0	3	0
Vissel Kobe	2021	J1 League	28	3	3	0	3	1	0	0	0	0	34	4
Vissel Kobe	2022	J1 League	8	0	3	0	1	0	6	0	0	0	18	0
Vissel Kobe	2023	J1 League	0	0	0	0	5	0	0	0	0	0	5	0
Vissel Kobe	2024	J1 League	0	0	0	0	2	0	0	0	0	0	2	0
Vissel Kobe	Total		65	6	15	1	29	6	7	0	0	0	116	13
Peralada (loan)	2018–19	Segunda División B	4	0	–		–		–		–		4	0
Kyoto Sanga (loan)	2019	J2 League	7	1	–		–		–		–		7	1
Basara Hyogo	2025	Kansai Soccer League	14	1	1	0	–		–		7 (Note: Appearance in All Japan Senior Football Championship)	0	22	1
Career total			90	8	16	1	29	6	7	0	7	0	149	15

== Honours ==
Vissel Kobe

- J1 League: 2023, 2024
