= Jean Patric =

Brazilian footballer

Personal information
- Full name: Jean Patrick Lima dos Reis
- Date of birth: 14 May 1997 (age 29)
- Place of birth: Itaparica, Brazil
- Height: 1.75 m (5 ft 9 in)
- Positions: Winger; forward

Team information
- Current team: Vissel Kobe
- Number: 26

Youth career
- –2015: Grêmio Osasco
- 2015–2017: São Paulo

Senior career*
Years	Team	Apps	(Gls)
2017	São Paulo	0	(0)
2017	→ América RN (loan)	18	(1)
2017	→ Volta Redonda (loan)	5	(0)
2017–2018	Septemvri Sofia	4	(0)
2018	Grêmio Anápolis	0	(0)
2018	Zaria Bălți	12	(2)
2019	América RN	25	(5)
2019–2020	Académico Viseu	21	(4)
2020–2021	Santa Clara	36	(2)
2022	Cerezo Osaka	28	(5)
2023–	Vissel Kobe	89	(6)
- * Club domestic league appearances and goals as of 10 August 2026

Jean Patrick Lima dos Reis (born 14 May 1997), known as Jean Patric, is a Brazilian footballer who plays as a winger or a forward for J1 League club Vissel Kobe.

== Career ==
=== Septemvri Sofia ===
On 4 August 2017 Jean Patric joined Levski Sofia on trials. Later Nikolay Mitov was released and Jean Patric wasn't approved by the new manager since he wanted more experienced players. Nikolay Mitov took Septemvri Sofia and on 2 September Patric played in a friendly match for the team against Lokomotiv Sofia and scored 2 goals. On 10 September he officially signed with Sentemvri for 2 years. He made his official debut for the team on 15 September 2017 in a league match against Levski Sofia. On 11 January 2018 he was released from the club on mutual agreement.

== Career statistics ==
=== Club ===
As of match played 25 May 2025

Appearances and goals by club, season and competition
Club	Season	League			State league (Note: Includes Campeonato Potiguar)		National cup (Note: Includes Copa do Brasil, Bulgarian Cup, Moldovan Cup, Taça de Portugal, Emperor's Cup)		League cup (Note: Includes Taça da Liga, J.League Cup)		Continental		Other		Total	
Club	Season	Division	Apps	Goals	Apps	Goals	Apps	Goals	Apps	Goals	Apps	Goals	Apps	Goals	Apps	Goals
América RN (loan)	2017	Série D	0	0	18	1	1	0	–		–		–		19	1
Volta Redonda (loan)	2017	Série C	5	0	0	0	0	0	–		–		–		5	0
América RN	2019	Série D	9	3	16	2	2	0	–		–		–		27	5
Septemvri Sofia	2017–18	Bulgarian First League	4	0	–		1	0	–		–		–		5	0
FC Bălți	2018	Moldovan National Division	12	2	–		2	1	–		1 (Note: Appearance in UEFA Europa League)	0	–		15	3
Académico Viseu	2019–20	Liga Portugal 2	21	4	–		5	0	0	0	–		–		26	4
Santa Clara	2020–21	Primeira Liga	20	0	–		3	0	0	0	–		–		23	0
Santa Clara	2021–22	Primeira Liga	16	2	–		2	0	3	1	6 (Note: Appearances in UEFA Europa Conference League)	0	–		27	3
Santa Clara	Total		36	2	–		5	0	3	1	6	0	–		76	7
Cerezo Osaka	2022	J1 League	28	5	–		4	1	7	1	–		–		39	7
Vissel Kobe	2023	J1 League	27	3	–		4	2	3	1	–		–		34	6
Vissel Kobe	2024	J1 League	29	1	–		5	1	2	1	4 (Note: Appearances in AFC Champions League Elite)	0	1 (Note: Appearance in Japanese Super Cup)	0	41	3
Vissel Kobe	2025	J1 League	7	0	–		0	0	0	0	0	0	0	0	7	0
Vissel Kobe	Total		63	4	–		9	3	5	2	4	0	1	0	82	9
Career total			178	20	34	3	29	6	15	4	11	0	1	0	268	33

== Honours ==
Vissel Kobe

- J1 League: 2023, 2024
- Emperor's Cup: 2024
- J1 100 Year Vision League: 2026
