= Tatsunori Sakurai =

Japanese footballer

Tatsunori Sakurai 櫻井 辰徳
Personal information
- Date of birth: 26 July 2002 (age 24)
- Place of birth: Iruma, Saitama, Japan
- Height: 1.78 m (5 ft 10 in)
- Position: Defensive midfielder

Team information
- Current team: Sagan Tosu
- Number: 6

Youth career
- 2009–2014: Ogose SSS
- 2015–2017: Higashimatsuyama Pelenia FC
- 2018–2020: Maebashi Ikuei High School

Senior career*
Years	Team	Apps	(Gls)
2021–2026	Vissel Kobe	2	(0)
2022–2023	→ Tokushima Vortis (loan)	44	(0)
2024	→ Mito HollyHock (loan)	16	(0)
2025	→ Sagan Tosu (loan)	36	(0)
2026–	Sagan Tosu	16	(0)
- * Club domestic league appearances and goals as of 14 August 2026

Tatsunori Sakurai (櫻井 辰徳, Sakurai Tatsunori; born 26 July 2002) is a Japanese footballer who plays as a defensive midfielder for J2 League club Sagan Tosu.

== Career statistics ==
=== Club ===
As of 3 March 2021.

Club	Season	League			National Cup		League Cup		Other		Total	
Club	Season	Division	Apps	Goals	Apps	Goals	Apps	Goals	Apps	Goals	Apps	Goals
Vissel Kobe	2020	J1 League	0	0	0	0	0	0	0	0	0	0
Vissel Kobe	2021	J1 League	0	0	0	0	1 (Note: Appearances in the J.League Cup)	0	0	0	1	0
Career total			0	0	0	0	1	0	0	0	1	0
