= Kaito Yamada =

Japanese footballer (born 2006)

Kaito Yamada 山田 海斗
Personal information
- Date of birth: 31 August 2006 (age 20)
- Place of birth: Hyōgo Prefecture, Japan
- Height: 1.92 m (6 ft 4 in)
- Position: Defender

Team information
- Current team: Vissel Kobe
- Number: 43

Youth career
- –2024: Vissel Kobe

Senior career*
Years	Team	Apps	(Gls)
2023–	Vissel Kobe	7	(0)
2025	→ Tacoma Defiance (loan)	25	(3)

International career
- Japan U20
- * Club domestic league appearances and goals as of 10 August 2026

Kaito Yamada (山田 海斗, Yamada Kaito; born 31 August 2006) is a Japanese professional footballer who plays as a defender for J1 League club Vissel Kobe.

== Early life ==
Yamada was born on 31 August 2006. Born in Hyōgo Prefecture, Japan, he is a native of Hyōgo Prefecture, Japan.

== Club career ==
As a youth player, Yamada joined the youth academy of Japanese side Vissel Kobe, where he captained the club's under-18 team. Japanese news website Gekisaka wrote in 2024 that he "secured a regular position as a center back last season and played in 21 league games, the most on the team. He has grown into a key player in the group that is competing for the championship" while playing for the under-18 team.

In 2025, he was sent on loan to American side Tacoma Defiance. On 8 March 2025, he debuted for the club during a 2–3 away loss to Ventura County FC in the league.

== International career ==
Yamada is a Japan youth international, having played for the Japan U-17s in 2023 and the U-18s in 2024. In March 2026, he was selected as part of the U-21 squad for their tour of South Korea.

== Honours ==
Vissel Kobe

- J1 100 Year Vision League: 2026

== Career statistics ==
As of 27 April 2026.

Appearances and goals by club, season and competition
Club	Season	League			National cup (Note: Includes U.S. Open Cup)		Continental		Total	
Club	Season	Division	Apps	Goals	Apps	Goals	Apps	Goals	Apps	Goals
Vissel Kobe	2023	J1 League	0	0	0	0	0	0	0	0
Vissel Kobe	2024	J1 League	0	0	0	0	0	0	0	0
Vissel Kobe	2026	J1 (100)	6	0	–		2 (Note: Appearances in AFC Champions League Elite)	0	8	0
Vissel Kobe	Total		6	0	0	0	2	0	8	0
Tacoma Defiance (loan)	2025	MLS Next Pro	25	3	3	0	0	0	28	3
Career total			31	3	3	0	2	0	36	3
