= Yuya Kuwasaki =

Japanese footballer

Yuya Kuwasaki 鍬先 祐弥
Personal information
- Full name: Yuya Kuwasaki
- Date of birth: 15 May 1998 (age 28)
- Place of birth: Nagasaki, Nagasaki, Japan
- Height: 1.76 m (5 ft 9 in)
- Position: Midfielder

Team information
- Current team: Vissel Kobe
- Number: 25

Youth career
- 2005–2010: Yamazato Elementary School
- 2011–2013: Nagasaki Nanzan Junior High School
- 2014–2016: Higashi Fukuoka High School

College career
Years	Team	Apps	(Gls)
2017–2020	Waseda University		

Senior career*
Years	Team	Apps	(Gls)
2021–2023	V-Varen Nagasaki	104	(3)
2024–	Vissel Kobe	51	(1)
- * Club domestic league appearances and goals as of 10 August 2026

Yuya Kuwasaki (鍬先 祐弥, Kuwasaki Yuya; born 15 May 1998) is a Japanese footballer who plays as a midfielder for J1 League club Vissel Kobe.

== Early life ==
Yuya was born in Nagasaki. He studied and played in the football section of Yamazato Elementary School, Nagasaki Nanzan Junior High School, Higashi Fukuoka High School and Waseda University.

== Career ==
Yuya made his debut for V-Varen against FC Ryukyu on 20 March 2021, coming on for Ryota Isomura. He scored his first goal for the club on 25 September 2021, scoring in the 60th minute.

In January 2024, Kuwasaki moved to J1 League club Vissel Kobe ahead of the 2024 season.

== Career statistics ==
=== Club ===
As of 3 April 2024

Appearances and goals by club, season and competition
Club	Season	League			National Cup		League Cup		Other		Total	
Club	Season	Division	Apps	Goals	Apps	Goals	Apps	Goals	Apps	Goals	Apps	Goals
Japan			League		Emperor's Cup		J. League Cup		Other		Total	
V-Varen Nagasaki	2021	J2 League	33	1	3	0	–		–		36	1
V-Varen Nagasaki	2022	J2 League	34	1	3	0	–		–		37	1
V-Varen Nagasaki	2023	J2 League	37	1	0	0	–		–		37	1
V-Varen Nagasaki	Total		104	3	6	0	0	0	0	0	110	3
Vissel Kobe	2024	J1 League	0	0	0	0	0	0	0	0	0	0
Career total			104	3	6	0	0	0	0	0	110	3

== Honours ==
=== Club ===
Vissel Kobe

- J1 League: 2024
- Emperor's Cup: 2024
- J1 100 Year Vision League: 2026
