= Daiya Maekawa =

Japanese footballer

Daiya Maekawa 前川 黛也
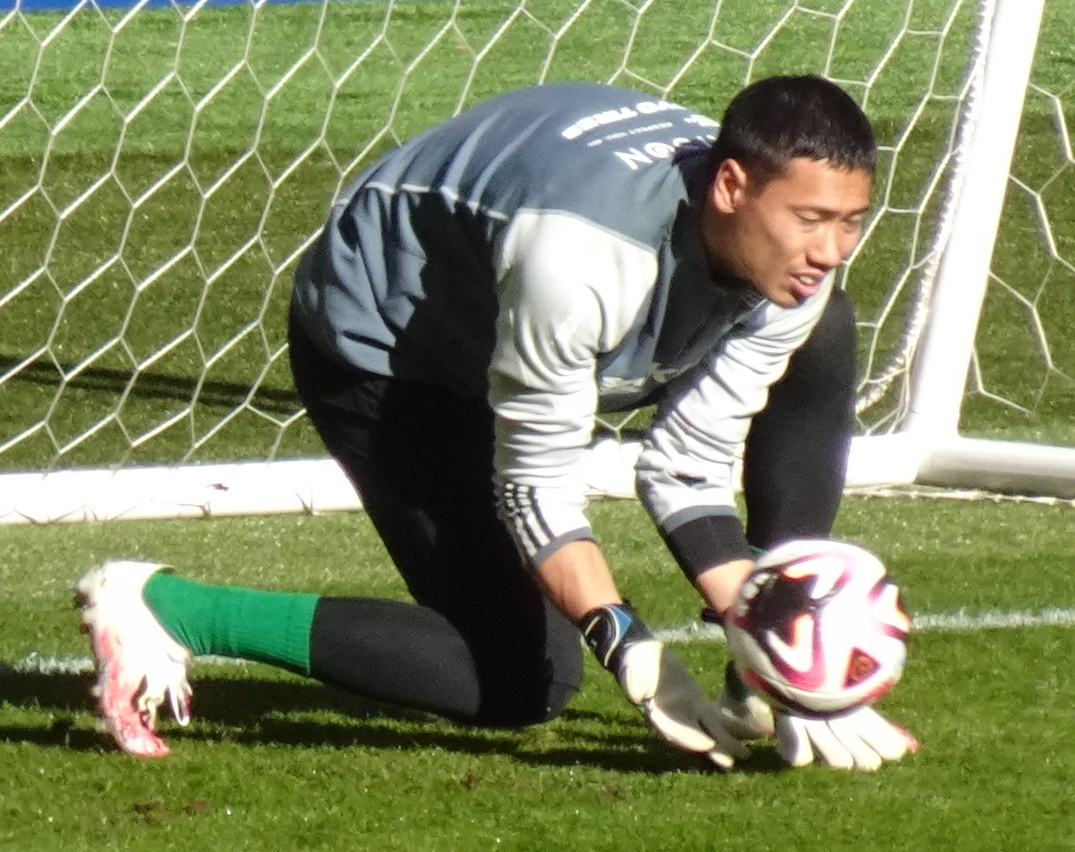
- Maekawa training for an international friendly

Personal information
- Full name: Daiya Maekawa
- Date of birth: September 8, 1994 (age 32)
- Place of birth: Hiroshima, Japan
- Height: 1.91 m (6 ft 3 in)
- Position: Goalkeeper

Team information
- Current team: Vissel Kobe
- Number: 1

Youth career
- Oita Trinita
- –2009: Sanfrecce Hiroshima
- 2010–2012: Hiroshima Minami High School

College career
Years	Team	Apps	(Gls)
2013–2016	Kansai University		

Senior career*
Years	Team	Apps	(Gls)
2017–	Vissel Kobe	186	(0)

International career^{‡}
2023–2024	Japan	2	(0)
- * Club domestic league appearances and goals as of 10 August 2026 ‡ National team caps and goals as of 6 June 2024

Daiya Maekawa (前川 黛也, Maekawa Daiya; born September 8, 1994) is a Japanese professional footballer who plays as a goalkeeper for J1 League club Vissel Kobe.

== Career ==
Maekawa was born in Hiroshima Prefecture on September 8, 1994. His father is the former Japan national team goalkeeper Kazuya Maekawa. After graduating from Kansai University, he joined J1 League club Vissel Kobe in 2017.

== International career ==
He was called up to the senior Japan squad in March 2021. He played in the 2026 World Cup qualifying matches against Myanmar on 16 November 2023 and 6 June 2024. He was also included in the Japan squad for the 2023 AFC Asian Cup.

== Career statistics ==
Club performance			League		Cup		League Cup		Continental		Other		Total	
Season	Club	League	Apps	Goals	Apps	Goals	Apps	Goals	Apps	Goals	Apps	Goals	Apps	Goals
Japan			League		Emperor's Cup		J. League Cup		Asia		Other		Total	
2017	Vissel Kobe	J1 League	0	0	0	0	0	0	—		—		0	0
2018	Vissel Kobe	J1 League	4	0	1	0	7	0	—		—		12	0
2019	Vissel Kobe	J1 League	8	0	1	0	4	0	—		—		13	0
2020	Vissel Kobe	J1 League	15	0	—		0	0	5	0	0	0	20	0
2021	Vissel Kobe	J1 League	19	0	1	0	4	0	—		—		24	0
2022	Vissel Kobe	J1 League	18	0	0	0	1	0	6	0	—		25	0
2023	Vissel Kobe	J1 League	34	0	4	0	1	0	—		—		39	0
2024	Vissel Kobe	J1 League	17	0	—		—		—		—		17	0
Career total			115	0	7	0	17	0	11	0	0	0	150	0

=== International ===
As of 6 June 2024

National team	Year	Apps	Goals
Japan	2021	0	0
Japan	2023	1	0
Japan	2024	1	0
Total		2	0

== Honours ==
Vissel Kobe

- J1 100 Year Vision League: 2026
- J1 League: 2023, 2024
- Emperor's Cup: 2024
