= Tetsushi Yamakawa =

Japanese footballer

Personal information
- Full name: Tetsushi Yamakawa
- Date of birth: 1 October 1997 (age 29)
- Place of birth: Amagasaki, Hyōgo, Japan
- Height: 1.86 m (6 ft 1 in)
- Position: Centre-back

Team information
- Current team: Vissel Kobe
- Number: 4

Youth career
- 2004–2009: Sasahara SC
- 2010–2015: Vissel Kobe

College career
Years	Team	Apps	(Gls)
2016–2019	University of Tsukuba		

Senior career*
Years	Team	Apps	(Gls)
2019–	Vissel Kobe	176	(4)

International career^{‡}
2014	Japan U17		
2016	Japan U19		
2017	Japan U20		
- * Club domestic league appearances and goals as of 10 August 2026 ‡ National team caps and goals as of 28 March 2021

Tetsushi Yamakawa (山川 哲史, Yamakawa Tetsushi; born 1 October 1997) is a Japanese professional footballer currently playing as a centre-back for Vissel Kobe.

== Career statistics ==
=== Club ===
As of match played 8 December 2024.

Appearances and goals by club, season and competition
Club	Season	League			National Cup		League Cup		Continental		Other		Total	
Club	Season	Division	Apps	Goals	Apps	Goals	Apps	Goals	Apps	Goals	Apps	Goals	Apps	Goals
University of Tsukuba	2016	—			1 (Note: Appearances in the Emperor's Cup)	0	—		—		—		1	0
University of Tsukuba	2017	—			3	0	—		—		—		3	0
University of Tsukuba	Total		0	0	4	0	—		—		—		4	0
Vissel Kobe	2019	J1 League	0	0	0	0	0	0	—		—		0	0
Vissel Kobe	2020	J1 League	5	0	—		0	0	5 (Note: Appearances in the AFC Champions League)	0	—		10	0
Vissel Kobe	2021	J1 League	29	0	2	0	1 (Note: Appearances in the J.League Cup)	0	—		—		32	0
Vissel Kobe	2022	J1 League	28	1	2	0	1	0	4	0	—		35	1
Vissel Kobe	2023	J1 League	26	0	1	0	3	0	—		—		30	0
Vissel Kobe	2024	J1 League	37	3	3	0	1	0	4	0	1 (Note: Appearances in the Japanese Super Cup)	0	46	3
Vissel Kobe	Total		125	4	8	0	6	0	13	0	1	0	153	4
Career total			125	4	12	0	6	0	13	0	1	0	157	4

== Honours ==
Vissel Kobe

- J1 League: 2023, 2024
- Emperor's Cup: 2024
- J1 100 Year Vision League: 2026
