= Taisei Miyashiro =

Japanese footballer

Taisei Miyashiro 宮代 大聖
Personal information
- Full name: Taisei Miyashiro
- Date of birth: 26 May 2000 (age 26)
- Place of birth: Minato, Tōkyō, Japan
- Height: 1.78 m (5 ft 10 in)
- Positions: Forward; winger

Team information
- Current team: Las Palmas
- Number: 18

Youth career
- 2006–2008: Shibuya Tobu JFC
- 2009–2018: Kawasaki Frontale

Senior career*
Years	Team	Apps	(Gls)
2019–2023	Kawasaki Frontale	46	(9)
2019	→ Renofa Yamaguchi (loan)	19	(2)
2021	→ Tokushima Vortis (loan)	32	(7)
2022	→ Sagan Tosu (loan)	22	(8)
2024–2026	Vissel Kobe	66	(22)
2026	→ Las Palmas (loan)	17	(4)
2026–	Las Palmas	0	(0)

International career^{‡}
2015	Japan U15	3	(2)
2017	Japan U17	9	(5)
2018	Japan U18	1	(0)
2018	Japan U19	5	(4)
2019–2021	Japan U20	6	(2)
2025–	Japan	2	(0)
Medal record
Representing Japan
AFC U-19 Championship
Bronze medal – third place	2018
- * Club domestic league appearances and goals as of 3 June 2026 ‡ National team caps and goals as of 15 July 2025

Taisei Miyashiro (宮代 大聖, Miyashiro Taisei; born 26 May 2000) is a Japanese professional footballer who plays as a forward or a winger for Segunda División club Las Palmas and the Japan national team.

== Club career ==
=== Early career ===
A youth product of Kawasaki Frontale, Miyashiro signed his professional contract in 2018. On 16 July 2019, he moved to Renofa Yamaguchi on loan. On 28 September, Miyashiro scored his first league goal against Avispa Fukuoka. Returning to his parent club from loan, on 2 September 2020, he scored his first goal for Kawasaki Frontale against Vissel Kobe in the quarterfinals of Levan Cup.

In January 2021, Miyashiro joined Tokushima Vortis on another loan. On 21 March, he scored his first goal in the sixth round of Yokohama FC and contributed to its first league victory. In January 2022, Miyashiro moved to Sagan Tosu on loan.

=== Vissel Kobe ===
In January 2024, Miyashiro transferred for Vissel Kobe and was given the number 9 shirt.

=== Las Palmas ===
On 17 January 2026, Miyashiro was loaned to Spanish Segunda División club UD Las Palmas until 30 June. The transfer was made pernament on 22 June, after Miyashiro appeared in 19 official matches, scoring 4 goals and providing 2 assists in the previous season.

== Style of play ==
Former Spanish footballer Luis García described Miyashiro as a powerful player, a player who has a perfect shot with both legs and head.

== Career statistics ==
=== Club ===
As of 4 September 2026

Appearances and goals by club, season and competition
Club	Season	League			Cup		League Cup		Other		Total	
Club	Season	Division	Apps	Goals	Apps	Goals	Apps	Goals	Apps	Goals	Apps	Goals
Japan			League		Emperor's Cup		J.League Cup		Contineltal/Other		Total	
Kawasaki Frontale	2019	J1 League	0	0	0	0	0	0	–		0	0
Kawasaki Frontale	2020	J1 League	16	1	0	0	5	1	–		21	2
Kawasaki Frontale	2023	J1 League	30	8	5	2	5	1	–		40	11
Kawasaki Frontale	Total		46	9	5	2	10	2	0	0	61	13
Renofa Yamaguchi (loan)	2019	J2 League	19	2	1	0	–		–		20	2
Tokushima Vortis (loan)	2021	J1 League	32	7	2	0	2	0	–		36	7
Sagan Tosu (loan)	2022	J1 League	22	8	2	2	2	0	–		26	10
Vissel Kobe	2024	J1 League	32	11	5	3	2	0	8	4	48	18
Vissel Kobe	2025	J1 League	34	11	5	2	2	0	6	3	47	16
Vissel Kobe	Total		66	22	10	5	4	0	14	7	95	34
UD Las Palmas	2025-26	Segunda División	19	4	0	0	0	0	0	0	19	4
UD Las Palmas	2025	Segunda División	3	2	0	0	0	0	–		3	2
UD Las Palmas	Total		22	6	0	0	0	0	0	0	22	6
Career total			177	46	15	7	13	1	14	7	220	61

== Honours ==
Kawasaki Frontale

- J1 League: 2020
- Emperor's Cup: 2023, 2024

Vissel Kobe

- J1 League: 2024
- Emperor's Cup: 2024

Japan

- EAFF Championship: 2025
