= Nanasei Iino =

Japanese footballer

Personal information
- Date of birth: 2 October 1996 (age 30)
- Place of birth: Niigata, Japan
- Height: 1.73 m (5 ft 8 in)
- Position: Right back

Team information
- Current team: Vissel Kobe
- Number: 2

Youth career
- Joetsu FC
- 2009–2014: Albirex Niigata

College career
Years	Team	Apps	(Gls)
2015–2018	Kokushikan University		

Senior career*
Years	Team	Apps	(Gls)
2019–2021	Thespakusatsu Gunma	48	(3)
2021–2022	Sagan Tosu	51	(1)
2022−	Vissel Kobe	68	(0)
- * Club domestic league appearances and goals as of 11 September 2025

Nanasei Iino (飯野 七聖, Iino Nanasei; born 2 October 1996) is a Japanese footballer currently playing as a right back for Vissel Kobe.

== Career statistics ==
=== Club ===
As of 29 October 2020.

Club	Season	League			National Cup		League Cup		Other		Total	
Club	Season	Division	Apps	Goals	Apps	Goals	Apps	Goals	Apps	Goals	Apps	Goals
Thespakusatsu Gunma	2019	J3 League	20	1	1 (Note: Appearances in the Emperor's Cup)	0	0	0	0	0	21	1
Thespakusatsu Gunma	2020	J2 League	28	2	0	0	0	0	0	0	28	2
Sagan Tosu	2021	J1 League	15	0	0	0	1	0	0	0	16	0
Career total			36	1	1	0	0	0	0	0	37	2

== Honours ==
Vissel Kobe

- J1 League: 2023, 2024
- J1 100 Year Vision League: 2026
