= Daiju Sasaki =

Japanese footballer

Personal information
- Date of birth: September 17, 1999 (age 27)
- Place of birth: Hamada, Shimane, Japan
- Height: 1.80 m (5 ft 11 in)
- Position: Attacking midfielder

Team information
- Current team: Vissel Kobe
- Number: 13

Youth career
- 2008–2011: Iwami Esprit FC
- 2012–2014: Lespoir Hamada
- 2015–2017: Vissel Kobe

Senior career*
Years	Team	Apps	(Gls)
2018–	Vissel Kobe	180	(21)
2018–2019	→ Palmeiras (loan)	0	(0)

International career^{‡}
2017–	Japan U18	1	(0)
- * Club domestic league appearances and goals as of 10 August 2026 ‡ National team caps and goals as of August 17, 2018

Daiju Sasaki (佐々木 大樹, Sasaki Daiju; born 17 September 1999) is a Japanese footballer who plays as an attacking midfielder for Vissel Kobe.

== Career statistics ==
As of end of 2023 season.

Appearances and goals by club, season and competition
Club	Season	League			National Cup		League Cup		Continental		Other		Total	
Club	Season	Division	Apps	Goals	Apps	Goals	Apps	Goals	Apps	Goals	Apps	Goals	Apps	Goals
Vissel Kobe	2018	J1 League	6	1	0	0	4	1	—		—		10	2
Vissel Kobe	2020	J1 League	12	0	—		0	0	3	0	0	0	15	0
Vissel Kobe	2021	J1 League	30	1	1	0	7	0	—		—		38	1
Vissel Kobe	2022	J1 League	19	0	4	2	2	0	1	1	—		26	3
Vissel Kobe	2023	J1 League	33	7	4	1	4	0	—		—		41	8
Career total			100	9	9	3	17	1	4	1	0	0	130	14

== Honours ==
Vissel Kobe

- J1 League: 2023, 2024
- Emperor's Cup: 2024
- J1 100 Year Vision League: 2026
