= 2024 Albirex Niigata season =

Albirex Niigata
2024 season
- Manager: Rikizo Matsuhashi
- Stadium: Denka Big Swan Stadium
- J1 League: 15th
- Emperor's Cup: Second round
- J.League Cup: First round
- Average home league attendance: 22,430

The 2024 Albirex Niigata season was the club's 69th season in existence and the club's second season in the J1 League after a five-year absence. As well as the domestic league, they competed in the Emperor's Cup and the J.League Cup.

== Squad ==
=== Season squad ===
Squad no.	Name	Nationality	Date of birth (age at start of season)
Goalkeepers
1	Ryosuke Kojima	(Japan)	30 January 1997 (aged 27)
21	Koto Abe	(Japan)	1 August 1997 (aged 26)
23	Daisuke Yoshimitsu	(Japan)	21 February 1993 (aged 31)
39	Haruki Nishimura	(Japan)	19 April 2003 (aged 20)
Defenders
3	Thomas Deng	(Australia)	20 March 1997 (aged 26)
5	Michael Fitzgerald	(Japan)	17 September 1988 (aged 35)
18	Fumiya Hayakawa	(Japan)	12 January 1994 (aged 30)
24	Riita Mori	(Japan)	19 August 2001 (aged 22)
26	Ryo Endo	(Japan)	6 July 1998 (aged 25)
31	Yuto Horigome (c)	(Japan)	9 September 1994 (aged 29)
32	Takumi Hasegawa	(Japan)	6 October 1998 (aged 25)
35	Kazuhiko Chiba	(Japan)	21 June 1985 (aged 38)
45	Hayato Inamura ^{DSP}	(Japan)	6 May 2002 (aged 21)
Midfielders
6	Hiroki Akiyama	(Japan)	9 December 2000 (aged 23)
8	Eiji Miyamoto	(Japan)	3 August 1998 (aged 25)
14	Motoki Hasegawa	(Japan)	10 December 1998 (aged 25)
17	Danilo Gomes	(Brazil)	5 February 1999 (aged 25)
19	Yuji Hoshi	(Japan)	27 July 2002 (aged 21)
20	Yuzuru Shimada	(Japan)	28 November 1990 (aged 33)
22	Eitaro Matsuda	(Japan)	20 May 2001 (aged 22)
25	Soya Fujiwara	(Japan)	9 September 1995 (aged 28)
30	Jin Okumura	(Japan)	3 April 2001 (aged 22)
33	Yoshiaki Takagi	(Japan)	9 December 1992 (aged 31)
40	Aozora Ishiyama	(Japan)	27 January 2006 (aged 18)
Forwards
7	Kaito Taniguchi	(Japan)	7 September 1995 (aged 28)
9	Koji Suzuki	(Japan)	25 July 1989 (aged 34)
11	Shusuke Ota	(Japan)	23 February 1996 (aged 28)
16	Yota Komi	(Japan)	11 August 2002 (aged 21)
27	Motoki Nagakura	(Japan)	7 October 1999 (aged 24)

Last updated: 21 March 2024.
Source: Albirex Niigata website

=== Arrivals ===
Date	Positiontk	Player	From	Type	Source
10 August 2023	DF	(Japan) Riita Mori	(Japan) Waseda University	Full	
25 September 2023	MF	(Japan) Jin Okumura	(Japan) Kansai University of Social Welfare	Full	
8 December 2023	FW	(Japan) Yuji Ono	(Japan) Sagan Tosu	Full	
13 December 2023	MF	(Japan) Eiji Miyamoto	(Japan) Iwaki FC	Full	
13 December 2023	DF	(Japan) Ryo Endo	(Japan) Iwaki FC	Loan return	
23 December 2023	MF	(Japan) Motoki Hasegawa	(Japan) Ventforet Kofu	Full	
26 December 2023	GK	(Japan) Daisuke Yoshimitsu	(Japan) Renofa Yamaguchi	Full	
29 February 2024	DF	(Japan) Hayato Inamura	(Japan) Toyo University	DSP	

=== Departures ===
Date	Position	Player	To	Type	Source
30 November 2023	FW	(Brazil) Gustavo Nescau		Released	
5 December 2023	MF	(Japan) Takahiro Ko	(Japan) FC Tokyo	Full	
15 December 2023	GK	(Japan) Kazuki Fujita	(Japan) JEF United Chiba	Loan	
15 December 2023	MF	(Japan) Yushin Otake	(Japan) YSCC Yokohama	Loan	
22 December 2023	MF	(Japan) Shunsuke Mito	(Netherlands) Sparta Rotterdam	Full	
25 December 2023	MF	(Japan) Kazuyoshi Shimabuku	(Japan) Fujieda MYFC	Loan	
27 December 2023	DF	(Japan) Daichi Tagami	(Japan) Fagiano Okayama	Full	
27 December 2023	DF	(Japan) Taiki Watanabe	(Japan) Yokohama F. Marinos	Full	
5 January 2024	MF	(Japan) Jimpei Yoshida	(Japan) Kamatamare Sanuki	Loan	
25 January 2024	GK	(Japan) Takuya Seguchi		Retired	
21 March 2024	DF	(Japan) Naoto Arai	(Japan) Sanfrecce Hiroshima	Full	

== Pre-season matches ==
23 January 2024 Friendly	Albirex Niigata	2–1	Gamba Osaka	Yoshinoura Park Gosamaru Athletics Stadium
11:00 UTC+9	Nagakura 22'; Taniguchi 38'	Report
Note: Three periods of 45 minutes

== Competitions ==
=== Overall record ===
Competition	First match	Last match	Starting round	Record							
Competition	First match	Last match	Starting round	Pld	W	D	L	GF	GA	GD	Win %
J1 League	24 February 2024	November 2024	Matchday 1	18	5	5	8	23	27	−4	27.78
Emperor's Cup	12 June 2024		Second round	0	0	0	0	0	0	+0	—
J.League Cup	16 April 2024		First round	2	2	0	0	4	0	+4	100.00
Total				20	7	5	8	27	27	+0	35.00

Last updated: 16 June 2024
Source: Competitions

=== J1 League ===
==== Table ====
Pos	Team	Pld	W	D	L	GF	GA	GD	Pts	Qualification or relegation
14	Kyoto Sanga	38	12	11	15	43	55	−12	47	
15	Shonan Bellmare	38	12	9	17	53	58	−5	45	
16	Albirex Niigata	38	10	12	16	44	59	−15	42	
17	Kashiwa Reysol	38	9	14	15	39	51	−12	41	
18	Júbilo Iwata (R)	38	10	8	20	47	68	−21	38	Relegation to the J2 League

Source: J1 League, J.League Data Site
Rules for classification: 1) Points; 2) Goal difference; 3) Goals scored; 4) Head-to-head points; 5) Head-to-head goal difference; 6) Head-to-head goals scored; 7) Fewer disciplinary points.
(R) Relegated

==== Results summary ====
Overall								Home						Away					
Pld	W	D	L	GF	GA	GD	Pts	W	D	L	GF	GA	GD	W	D	L	GF	GA	GD
18	5	5	8	23	27	−4	20	2	3	4	11	14	−3	3	2	4	12	13	−1

Last updated: 1 June 2024.
Source: Worldfootball

==== Results by round ====
Round	1	2	3	4	5	6	7	8	9	10	11	12	13	14	15	16	17	18
Ground	A	A	H	A	H	A	H	H	A	H	H	A	H	H	A	H	A	A
Result	W	L	W	D	D	L	L	D	W	L	D	L	L	W	L	L	W	D
Position	4	11	5	7	7	11	14	14	11	14	15	16	16	15	15	16	14	15

Updated to match(es) played on 16 June 2024. Source: Worldfootball
A = Away; H = Home; W = Win; D = Draw; L = Loss

==== Matches ====
The full league fixtures were released on 23 January 2024.

24 February 1	Sagan Tosu	1–2	Albirex Niigata	Tosu
14:00 UTC+9	Fukuta 5'		Taniguchi 45+3'; Arai 54'	Stadium: Ekimae Real Estate Stadium; Referee: Hiroki Kasahara

2 March 2	Gamba Osaka	1–0	Albirex Niigata	Suita
15:00 UTC+9	Usami 75' (pen.)			Stadium: Suita City Football Stadium; Referee: Koji Takasaki

9 March 3	Albirex Niigata	1–0	Nagoya Grampus	Niigata
14:05 UTC+9	Arai (yellow card) 83'; Hasegawa 88'	Report	Nagai (yellow card) 29'	Stadium: Denka Big Swan Stadium; Attendance: 22,942; Referee: Akihiko Ikeuchi

16 March 4	Tokyo Verdy	2–2	Albirex Niigata	Chōfu
16:03 UTC+9	Yamada 8'; Onaga 90'	Report	Taniguchi 32'; Nagakura 69'	Stadium: Ajinomoto Stadium; Attendance: 17,055; Referee: Atsushi Kamimura

30 March 5	Albirex Niigata	1–1	Kashiwa Reysol	Niigata
14:03 UTC+9	Chiba 57'	Report	Kinoshita 15'	Stadium: Denka Big Swan Stadium; Attendance: 20,359; Referee: Yoshimi Yamashita

3 April 6	Júbilo Iwata	2–0	Albirex Niigata	Iwata
19:03 UTC+9	Germain 75', 79'	Report		Stadium: Yamaha Stadium; Attendance: 8,355; Referee: Yoshiro Imamura

7 April 7	Albirex Niigata	0–1	Cerezo Osaka	Niigata
14:03 UTC+9		Report	Léo Ceará 69'	Stadium: Denka Big Swan Stadium; Attendance: 19,833; Referee: Yusuke Araki

13 April 8	Albirex Niigata	1–1	Hokkaido Consadole Sapporo	Niigata
14:03 UTC+9	Akiyama 80'	Report	Asano 20'; Omori (yellow card) 38' (yellow-red card) 75'	Stadium: Denka Big Swan Stadium; Attendance: 17,936; Referee: Takuto Okabe

20 April 9	Kyoto Sanga	0–1	Albirex Niigata	Kameoka
14:03 UTC+9		Report	Taniguchi 59'	Stadium: Sanga Stadium by Kyocera; Attendance: 9,022; Referee: Koichiro Kukushima

27 April 10	Albirex Niigata	1–3	FC Tokyo	Niigata
14:03 UTC+9	Hayakawa 90'	Report	Nakagawa 39'; Shirai 49'; Diego Oliveira 62'	Stadium: Denka Big Swan Stadium; Attendance: 24,438; Referee: Yudai Yamamoto

3 May 11	Albirex Niigata	1–1	Sanfrecce Hiroshima	Niigata
14:03 UTC+9	Hayakawa (red card) 33'; Takagi 90+4'	Report	Araki 70'	Stadium: Denka Big Swan Stadium; Attendance: 25,854; Referee: Shu Kawamata

6 May 12	Vissel Kobe	3–2	Albirex Niigata	Kobe
13:03 UTC+9	Sasaki 15'; Miyashiro 25'; Endo 55' (o.g.)	Report	Fujiwara 51'; Endo 76'	Stadium: Noevir Stadium Kobe; Attendance: 21,073; Referee: Yusuke Araki

11 May 13	Albirex Niigata	2–4	Urawa Red Diamonds	Niigata
14:03 UTC+9	Ota 75'; Nagakura 87'	Report	Thiago Santana 4', 90+12' (pen.); Gustafson 65'; Maeda 69'	Stadium: Denka Big Swan Stadium; Attendance: 24,652; Referee: Hirokia Kasahara

15 May 14	Albirex Niigata	3–1	Yokohama F. Marinos	Niigata
19:03 UTC+9	Suzuki 51'; Taniguchi 53'; Okumura 82'	Report	Watanabe 25'	Stadium: Denka Big Swan Stadium; Attendance: 15,065; Referee: Koichiro Fukushima

19 May 15	Shonan Bellmare	2–1	Albirex Niigata	Hiratsuka
16:03 UTC+9	Lukian 35', 60'	Report	Nagakura 30'	Stadium: Lemon Gas Stadium Hiratsuka; Attendance: 11,427; Referee: Keigo Sendachi

25 May 16	Albirex Niigata	1–2	Avispa Fukuoka	Niigata
16:03 UTC+9	Hayakawa 90+3'	Report	Mae 37'; Konno 85'	Stadium: Denka Big Swan Stadium; Attendance: 20,197; Referee: Damian Sylwestrzak

1 June 17	Machida Zelvia	1–3	Albirex Niigata	Machida
15:03 UTC+9	Fujio 27'	Report	Komi 24'; Fujiwara 45'; Jang M.G 52' (o.g.)	Stadium: Machida GION Stadium; Attendance: 10,411; Referee: Shu Kawamata

16 June 18	Kashima Antlers	1–1	Albirex Niigata	Kashima
18:03 JST	Fujii 50'	Report	Komi 43'	Stadium: Kashima Soccer Stadium; Attendance: 15,499; Referee: Yuichi Nishimura

=== Emperor's Cup ===
12 June Second round	Albirex Niigata	4–4 (a.e.t.) (3–1 p)	Giravanz Kitakyushu	Niigata
19:00	Komi 14'; Taniguchi 45+3'; Okumura 53'; Akiyama 90' (pen.)	Report	Takahashi 37'; Sakamoto 42'; Watanabe 78'; Takayoshi 90+4'	Stadium: Denka Big Swan Stadium; Attendance: 6,519; Referee: Yudai Yamamoto
	Penalties
	Akiyama (penalty scored); Suzuki (penalty scored); Horigome (penalty scored)		(penalty scored) Hirahara; (penalty missed) Hasegawa; (penalty missed) Kudo; (penalty missed) Watanabe

=== J.League Cup ===
17 April First round – Match 2	Iwaki FC	0–2	Albirex Niigata	Iwaki
19:03 UTC+9		Report	Hasegawa 6'; Taniguchi 90+1'	Stadium: Hawaiians Stadium Iwaki; Attendance: 3,618; Referee: Hiroki Kasahara

22 May First round – Match 3	Blaublitz Akita	0–2 (a.e.t.)	Albirex Niigata	Akita
19:03		Report	Ishiyama 99'; Okumura 111'	Stadium: Soyu Stadium; Attendance: 2,810; Referee: Jumpei Iida
