= 2023 Albirex Niigata season =

Albirex Niigata
2023 season
- Chairman: Daisuke Korenaga
- Manager: Rikizo Matsuhashi
- Stadium: Denka Big Swan Stadium
- J1 League: 15th
- Emperor's Cup: Third round
- J.League Cup: Group stage
- Top goalscorer: League: Shusuke Ota 4); All: Shusuke Ota (4)
- Average home league attendance: 23,061
- All statistics correct as of 24 June 2023.

The 2023 season was Albirex Niigata's 68th season in existence and the club's first season back in the top flight of Japanese football. In addition to the domestic league, Albirex Niigata participated in this season's edition of the Emperor's Cup and the J.League Cup.

== Players ==
=== First-team squad ===
As of 5 June 2023.

Note: Flags indicate national team as defined under FIFA eligibility rules; some limited exceptions apply. Players may hold more than one non-FIFA nationality.

No.	Pos.	Nation	Player
1	GK	JPN	Ryosuke Kojima
2	DF	JPN	Naoto Arai
3	DF	AUS	Thomas Deng
5	DF	JPN	Michael Fitzgerald
6	MF	JPN	Hiroki Akiyama
7	FW	JPN	Kaito Taniguchi
8	MF	JPN	Takahiro Ko
9	FW	JPN	Koji Suzuki
11	FW	JPN	Shusuke Ota
13	MF	JPN	Ryotaro Ito (Note: Ito will play his last game for Albirex on 11 June. Right after, he will be fully transferred to Sint-Truidense V.V. (Jupiler Pro League/Belgium 1st Division).)
14	MF	JPN	Shunsuke Mito
15	DF	JPN	Taiki Watanabe
16	FW	JPN	Yota Komi
17	MF	BRA	Danilo Gomes
18	DF	JPN	Fumiya Hayakawa
19	MF	JPN	Yuji Hoshi
20	MF	JPN	Yuzuru Shimada

No.	Pos.	Nation	Player
21	GK	JPN	Koto Abe
22	MF	JPN	Eitaro Matsuda
23	FW	BRA	Gustavo Nescau
24	GK	JPN	Takuya Seguchi
25	MF	JPN	Soya Fujiwara
29	MF	PER	Kazuyoshi Shimabuku
30	GK	JPN	Shota Uchiyama ^{Type 2}
31	DF	JPN	Yuto Horigome (captain)
32	DF	JPN	Takumi Hasegawa
33	MF	JPN	Yoshiaki Takagi
35	DF	JPN	Kazuhiko Chiba
39	GK	JPN	Haruki Nishimura
40	MF	JPN	Aozora Ishiyama ^{Type 2}
45	DF	JPN	Hayato Inamura ^{DSP}
47	MF	JPN	Jimpei Yoshida
50	DF	JPN	Daichi Tagami

=== Out on loan ===
Note: Flags indicate national team as defined under FIFA eligibility rules; some limited exceptions apply. Players may hold more than one non-FIFA nationality.

No.	Pos.	Nation	Player
—	GK	JPN	Kazuki Fujita (to Tochigi SC)
—	DF	JPN	Ryo Endo (to Iwaki FC)

No.	Pos.	Nation	Player
—	DF	JPN	Shosei Okamoto (to Kagoshima United)
—	FW	JPN	Ken Yamura (to Fujieda MYFC)

== Transfers ==
=== In ===
Pos.	Player	Transferred from	Fee	Date	Source
MF	(Brazil) Danilo Gomes	(Brazil) Ponte Preta	Free	14 January 2023	

=== Out ===
Pos.	Player	Transferred to	Fee	Date	Source
FW	(Portugal) Alexandre Guedes	(Portugal) Paços de Ferreira	Free	3 January 2023	

== Competitions ==
=== Overview ===
Competition	First match	Last match	Starting round	Final position	Record							
Competition	First match	Last match	Starting round	Final position	Pld	W	D	L	GF	GA	GD	Win %
J1 League	18 February 2023	12 November 2023	Matchday 1		18	4	6	8	19	28	−9	22.22
Emperor's Cup	7 June 2023		Second round		1	1	0	0	1	0	+1	100.00
J.League Cup	8 March 2023	18 June 2023	Group stage	Group stage	6	2	0	4	6	8	−2	33.33
Total					25	7	6	12	26	36	−10	28.00

Last updated: 24 June 2023
Source: Soccerway

=== J1 League ===
==== League table ====
Pos	Team	Pld	W	D	L	GF	GA	GD	Pts	Qualification or relegation
1	Vissel Kobe (C)	34	21	8	5	60	29	+31	71	Qualification for the AFC Champions League Elite league stage
2	Yokohama F. Marinos	34	19	7	8	63	40	+23	64	Qualification for the AFC Champions League Elite league stage
3	Sanfrecce Hiroshima	34	17	7	10	42	28	+14	58	Qualification for the AFC Champions League Two group stage
4	Urawa Red Diamonds	34	15	12	7	42	27	+15	57	
5	Kashima Antlers	34	14	10	10	43	34	+9	52	
6	Nagoya Grampus	34	14	10	10	41	36	+5	52	
7	Avispa Fukuoka	34	15	6	13	37	43	−6	51	
8	Kawasaki Frontale	34	14	8	12	51	45	+6	50	Qualification for the AFC Champions League Elite league stage (Note: Qualified as the 2023 Emperor's Cup winners.)
9	Cerezo Osaka	34	15	4	15	39	34	+5	49	
10	Albirex Niigata	34	11	12	11	36	40	−4	45	
11	FC Tokyo	34	12	7	15	42	46	−4	43	
12	Hokkaido Consadole Sapporo	34	10	10	14	56	61	−5	40	
13	Kyoto Sanga	34	12	4	18	40	45	−5	40	
14	Sagan Tosu	34	9	11	14	43	47	−4	38	
15	Shonan Bellmare	34	8	10	16	40	56	−16	34	
16	Gamba Osaka	34	9	7	18	38	61	−23	34	
17	Kashiwa Reysol	34	6	15	13	33	47	−14	33	
18	Yokohama FC (R)	34	7	8	19	31	58	−27	29	Relegation to the J2 League

Source: JLeague.jp, J.League Data Site
Rules for classification: 1) Points; 2) Goal difference; 3) Goals scored; 4) Head-to-head points; 5) Head-to-head goal difference; 6) Head-to-head goals scored; 7) Fewer disciplinary points.
(C) Champions; (R) Relegated

==== Results summary ====
Overall								Home						Away					
Pld	W	D	L	GF	GA	GD	Pts	W	D	L	GF	GA	GD	W	D	L	GF	GA	GD
18	4	6	8	19	28	−9	18	3	2	4	11	16	−5	1	4	4	8	12	−4

Last updated: 24 June 2023.

==== Results by round ====
Round	1	2	3	4	5	6	7	8	9	10	11	12	13	14	15	16	17	18	19
Ground	A	A	H	H	A	H	A	H	A	H	A	H	H	A	H	A	H	A	H
Result	D	W	D	W	L	L	D	W	D	L	L	D	W	L	L	D	L	D	
Position																			

Updated to match(es) played on 24 June 2023. Source:
A = Away; H = Home; W = Win; D = Draw; L = Loss

==== Matches ====
The league fixtures were announced on 20 January 2023.

18 February 2023 1	Cerezo Osaka	2–2	Albirex Niigata	Osaka
14:00	Tameda 28'; Okuno 75'; Maikuma (yellow card) 90+1'	Report	Taniguchi 22'; Chiba 80'	Stadium: Yodoko Sakura Stadium; Referee: Yuichi Nishimura

26 February 2023 2	Sanfrecce Hiroshima	1–2	Albirex Niigata	Hiroshima
14:00	Deng (yellow card) 45'; Shiotani 79'; Morishima (yellow card) 90'	Report	Ota 14'; Suzuki 37'; Shimada (yellow card) 78'; Gustavo (yellow card) 90+9'	Stadium: EDION Stadium; Referee: Takuto Okabe

4 March 2023 3	Albirex Niigata	2–2	Hokkaido Consadole Sapporo	Niigata
14:00	Ito 20'; Ota 45+1'	Report	Fitzgerald 17' (o.g.); Baba (yellow card) 65'; Asano 79'; Nakamura (yellow card) 90+2'	Stadium: Denka Big Swan Stadium; Referee: Akihiko Ikeuchi

11 March 2023 4	Albirex Niigata	1–0	Kawasaki Frontale	Niigata
14:00	Ito 22'	Report		Stadium: Denka Big Swan Stadium; Referee: Jumpei Iida

18 March 2023 5	Urawa Red Diamonds	2–1	Albirex Niigata	Saitama
15:00	Sakai 35'; Akimoto 45+2'; Koizumi (yellow card) 68'	Report	Shusuke Ota 10'; Danilo Gomes (yellow card) 83'	Stadium: Urawa Komaba Stadium; Attendance: 15,167; Referee: Koichiro Fukushima

1 April 2023 6	Albirex Niigata	1–3	Nagoya Grampus	Niigata
14:00	Hayakawa (yellow card) 18'; Ota 35'; Fitzgerald (red card) 36'	Report	Nagai 56'; Junker 80'; Fujii (yellow card) 89'; Ishida (yellow card) 90+1'; Inagaki 90+4'	Stadium: Denka Big Swan Stadium; Attendance: 18,428; Referee: Yoshiro Imamura

9 April 2023 7	Vissel Kobe	0–0	Albirex Niigata	Kobe
14:00		Report		Stadium: NOEVIR Stadium Kobe; Referee: Hiroki Kasahara

15 April 2023 8	Albirex Niigata	3–2	Avispa Fukuoka	Niigata
14:00	Ito 47', 90+3', 90+5'	Report	Konno 17' (pen.); Oda 32'	Stadium: Denka Big Swan Stadium; Attendance: 16,692; Referee: Ryo Tanimoto

23 April 2023 9	Albirex Niigata	0–2	Kashima Antlers	Niigata
14:00	Fitzgerald (yellow card) 77'	Report	Suzuki 3', (yellow card) 28'; Kakita 26'; Nakama (yellow card) 43'	Stadium: Denka Big Swan Stadium; Referee: Yudai Yamamoto

29 April 2023 10	FC Tokyo	2–1	Albirex Niigata	Chōfu
15:00	Nakagawa 8'; Oliveira 34'	Report	Ito 12'	Stadium: Ajinomoto Stadium; Referee: Hayato Shimizu

3 May 2023 11	Yokohama FC	1–0	Albirex Niigata	Yokohama
19:03	Yuri 53'	Report		Stadium: Mitsuzawa Stadium; Attendance: 10,134; Referee: Yoshimi Yamashita

7 May 2023 12	Albirex Niigata	0–0	Kashiwa Reysol	Niigata
14:00		Report		Stadium: Denka Big Swan Stadium; Referee: Akihiko Ikeuchi

14 May 2023 13	Albirex Niigata	2–1	Yokohama F. Marinos	Niigata
13:30	Ito 57'; Mito 67'	Report	Fujita 45+1'	Stadium: Denka Big Swan Stadium; Referee: Koichiro Fukushima

20 May 2023 14	Sagan Tosu	2–0	Albirex Niigata	Tosu
17:00	Ono 11'; Kawata 80' (pen.)	Report		Stadium: Ekimae Real Estate Stadium; Referee: Yuichi Nishimura

28 May 2023 15	Albirex Niigata	1–3	Gamba Osaka	Niigata
14:00	Shimada (yellow card) 6'; Fitzgerald 48'	Report	Kurata 2'; Alano 44'; Kurokawa 56'	Stadium: Denka Big Swan Stadium; Attendance: 21,860; Referee: Masuya Ueda

3 June 2023 16	Shonan Bellmare	2–2	Albirex Niigata	Hiratsuka
15:00				Stadium: Lemon Gas Stadium Hiratsuka; Referee: Yoshimi Yamashita

11 June 2023 17	Albirex Niigata	1–3	Kyoto Sanga	Niigata
14:00				Stadium: Denka Big Swan Stadium; Referee: Hajime Matsuo

24 June 2023 18	Kashiwa Reysol	0–0	Albirex Niigata	Kashiwa
19:00				Stadium: Sankyo Frontier Kashiwa Stadium; Referee: Takuto Okabe

1 July 2023 19	Albirex Niigata	v	Sanfrecce Hiroshima	Niigata
18:00				Stadium: Denka Big Swan Stadium

=== Emperor's Cup ===
7 June Second round	Albirex Niigata	1–0	Reilac Shiga	Niigata
19:00 JST	Danilo Gomes 38'	Report; Report		Stadium: Denka Big Swan Stadium; Attendance: 4,285; Referee: Hiroyuki Kimura

12 July Third round	Kataller Toyama	v	Albirex Niigata	Toyama
19:00 JST		Report; Report		Stadium: Toyama Stadium

=== J.League Cup ===
8 March 2023	Avispa Fukuoka	1–0	Albirex Niigata	Fukuoka
19:03	Tsuruno 59'	JLeague.co (EN); JLeague.jp (JA)		Stadium: Best Denki Stadium; Attendance: 3,092; Referee: Hayato Shimizu

26 March 2023	Albirex Niigata	1–0	Kashima Antlers	Niigata
14:03	Akiyama 52'	JLeague.co (EN); JLeague.jp (JA)		Stadium: Denka Big Swan Stadium; Attendance: 12,294; Referee: Yoshimi Yamashita

5 April 2023	Albirex Niigata	2–0	Kashiwa Reysol	Niigata
19:03	Matsuda 6'; Komi 16'	JLeague.co (EN); JLeague.jp (JA)		Stadium: Denka Big Swan Stadium; Attendance: 8,081; Referee: Yuichi Nishimura

19 April 2023	Kashiwa Reysol	3–2	Albirex Niigata	Kashiwa
19:03	Muto 17'; Hosoya 47'; Yamada 53'	JLeague.co (EN); JLeague.jp (JA)	Matsuda 22'; Taniguchi 29'	Stadium: Sankyo Frontier Kashiwa Stadium; Attendance: 4,650; Referee: Shu Kawamata

24 May 2023	Albirex Niigata	1–2	Avispa Fukuoka	Niigata
19:03	Gustavo 4'	JLeague.co (EN); JLeague.jp (JA)	Tsuruno 77'; Oda 86'	Stadium: Denka Big Swan Stadium; Attendance: 7,879; Referee: Takuto Okabe

18 June 2023	Kashima Antlers	2–0	Albirex Niigata	Kashima
18:00	Nakama 3'; Someno 12'	JLeague.co (EN); JLeague.jp (JA)	Gustavo (yellow card) 67'	Stadium: Kashima Soccer Stadium; Referee: Akihiko Ikeuchi
