= 2024 Sagan Tosu season =

Sagan Tosu
2024 season
- Manager: Kenta Kawai (until 8 August); Kosuke Kitani (from 9 August)
- Stadium: Ekimae Real Estate Stadium
- J1 League: 20th
- Emperor's Cup: Round of 16
- J.League Cup: Round 3
- Top goalscorer: League: Marcelo Ryan (10); All: Marcelo Ryan (11)
- Average home league attendance: 9,800

The 2024 season is the 27th season in the history of Sagan Tosu. They will be participating in the J1 League, Emperor's Cup as well as the J.League Cup. This will be coach Kenta Kawai's third season at the helm of the team.

== Friendlies ==
2 August 2024 Friendly	Sagan Tosu (Japan)	v	(Spain) Sevilla	Tosu
19:00 UTC+9				Stadium: Ekimae Real Estate Stadium

1 September 2024 Friendly	Sagan Tosu (Japan)	3–2	(Japan) Renofa Yamaguchi	Tosu
10:00 UTC+9				Stadium: Tosu Stadium Hokubu Ground

== Competitions ==
=== Overall record ===
Competition	First match	Last match	Starting round	Final position	Record							
Competition	First match	Last match	Starting round	Final position	Pld	W	D	L	GF	GA	GD	Win %
2024 J1 League	24 February 2024	December 2024	Matchday 1		30	7	3	20	38	60	−22	23.33
2024 Emperor's Cup	12 June 2024	21 August 2024	Second round	Round of 16	3	2	0	1	5	4	+1	66.67
2024 J.League Cup	24 April 2024	22 May 2024	Round 2	Round 3	2	1	1	0	2	1	+1	50.00
Total					35	10	4	21	45	65	−20	28.57

Last updated: 13 September 2024
Source: Soccerway

=== J1 League ===
==== League table ====
Pos	Team	Pld	W	D	L	GF	GA	GD	Pts	Qualification or relegation
16	Albirex Niigata	38	10	12	16	44	59	−15	42	
17	Kashiwa Reysol	38	9	14	15	39	51	−12	41	
18	Júbilo Iwata (R)	38	10	8	20	47	68	−21	38	Relegation to the J2 League
19	Hokkaido Consadole Sapporo (R)	38	9	10	19	43	66	−23	37	Relegation to the J2 League
20	Sagan Tosu (R)	38	10	5	23	48	68	−20	35	Relegation to the J2 League

Source: JLeague.co, JLeague.jp, J.League Data Site
Rules for classification: 1) Points; 2) Goal difference; 3) Goals scored; 4) Head-to-head points; 5) Head-to-head goal difference; 6) Head-to-head goals scored; 7) Fewer disciplinary points.
(R) Relegated

==== Results summary ====
Overall								Home						Away					
Pld	W	D	L	GF	GA	GD	Pts	W	D	L	GF	GA	GD	W	D	L	GF	GA	GD
30	7	3	20	38	60	−22	24	4	2	9	21	26	−5	3	1	11	17	34	−17

Last updated: 13 September 2024.

==== Results by round ====
Round	1	2	3	4	5	6	7	8	9	10	11	12	13	14	15	16	17	18	19	20	21	22	23	24
Ground	H	H	A	H	A	H	A	A	H	A	H	A	A	H	H	A	H	A	H	A	H	A	H	H
Result	L	W	L	L	L	D	L	L	W	D	L	L	W	W	L	W	L	L	W	L	L	W	L	
Position																								

Updated to match(es) played on 14 July 2024. Source:
A = Away; H = Home; W = Win; D = Draw; L = Loss

==== Matches ====
The fixtures were released on 23 January 2024.

24 February 2024 1	Sagan Tosu	1–2	Albirex Niigata	Tosu
14:00 UTC+9	Fukuta 5'		Taniguchi 45+3'; Suzuki (penalty missed) 52'; Arai 54'	Stadium: Ekimae Real Estate Stadium; Referee: Hiroki Kasahara

2 March 2024 2	Sagan Tosu	4–0	Hokkaido Consadole Sapporo	Tosu
14:00 UTC+9	Marcelo Ryan 14'; Vinícius Araújo 64' (pen.); Okamura 83' (o.g.); Harada 90+5'		Nakamura (yellow card) 19' (yellow-red card) 56'; Asano (penalty missed) 34'	Stadium: Ekimae Real Estate Stadium; Referee: Shu Kawamata

9 March 2024 3	Sanfrecce Hiroshima	4–0	Sagan Tosu	Hiroshima
15:00 UTC+9	Shiotani 18'; Kawamura 31'; Sotiriou 51' (pen.); Nakano 90+6'			Stadium: Edion Peace Wing Hiroshima; Referee: Yudai Yamamoto

16 March 2024 4	Sagan Tosu	0–2	Cerezo Osaka	Tosu
--:-- UTC+9				Stadium: Ekimae Real Estate Stadium

30 March 2024 5	Machida Zelvia	3–1	Sagan Tosu
--:-- UTC+9

3 April 2024 6	Sagan Tosu	0–0	Vissel Kobe	Tosu
--:-- UTC+9				Stadium: Ekimae Real Estate Stadium

7 April 2024 7	Urawa Reds	3–0	Sagan Tosu
--:-- UTC+9

14 April 2024 8	Gamba Osaka	2–0	Sagan Tosu
--:-- UTC+9

20 April 2024 9	Sagan Tosu	4–2	Kashima Antlers	Tosu
--:-- UTC+9				Stadium: Ekimae Real Estate Stadium

28 April 2024 10	Kashiwa Reysol	1–1	Sagan Tosu
--:-- UTC+9

3 May 2024 11	Sagan Tosu	0–2	Tokyo Verdy	Tosu
--:-- UTC+9				Stadium: Ekimae Real Estate Stadium

6 May 2024 12	Shonan Bellmare	2–1	Sagan Tosu
--:-- UTC+9

11 May 2024 13	Júbilo Iwata	0–3	Sagan Tosu
--:-- UTC+9

15 May 2024 14	Sagan Tosu	5–2	Kawasaki Frontale	Tosu
--:-- UTC+9				Stadium: Ekimae Real Estate Stadium

18 May 2024 15	Sagan Tosu	0–2	Nagoya Grampus	Tosu
--:-- UTC+9				Stadium: Ekimae Real Estate Stadium

31 May 2024 17	Sagan Tosu	0–1	FC Tokyo	Tosu
--:-- UTC+9				Stadium: Ekimae Real Estate Stadium

16 June 2024 18	Avispa Fukuoka	2–0	Sagan Tosu
--:-- UTC+9

22 June 2024 19	Sagan Tosu	3–0	Kyoto Sanga	Tosu
--:-- UTC+9				Stadium: Ekimae Real Estate Stadium

26 June 2024 20	Cerezo Osaka	1–0	Sagan Tosu	Osaka
19:00 UTC+9	Tezuka 8' (o.g.)			Stadium: Yodoko Sakura Stadium; Referee: Takafumi Mikuriya

30 June 2024 21	Sagan Tosu	1–4	Kashiwa Reysol	Tosu
19:00 UTC+9	Marcelo Ryan 37'		Matheus Sávio 62' (pen.), 64'; Kinoshita 72', 90'	Stadium: Ekimae Real Estate Stadium; Referee: Atsushi Kamimura

3 July 2024 16	Yokohama F. Marinos	0–1	Sagan Tosu	Yokohama
19:00 UTC+9			Yokoyama 53'	Stadium: NHK Spring Mitsuzawa Football Stadium; Referee: Yuichi Nishimura

6 July 2024 22	Albirex Niigata	3–4	Sagan Tosu	Niigata
18:30 UTC+9	Taniguchi 17'; Fitzgerald 61'; Fujiwara 84'		Yamazaki 13'; Yokoyama 32', 53'; Naganuma 51'	Stadium: Denka Big Swan Stadium; Referee: Shu Kawamata

14 July 2024 23	Sagan Tosu	0–2	Gamba Osaka	Tosu
19:00 UTC+9			Sakamoto 19'; Jebali 84'	Stadium: Ekimae Real Estate Stadium; Referee: Koji Takasaki

21 July 2024 24	Sagan Tosu	v	Sanfrecce Hiroshima	Tosu
19:00 UTC+9				Stadium: Ekimae Real Estate Stadium

=== Emperor's Cup ===
12 June 2024 Second round	Sagan Tosu	2–1	United	Tosu
19:00 UTC+9	Vinícius Araújo 3', 51'		Kobayashi 44' (pen.)	Stadium: Ekimae Real Estate Stadium; Referee: Damien Silvestjak

10 July 2024 Third round	Sagan Tosu	3–1	Yokohama FC	Yokohama
18:30 UTC+9	Sakaiya 14'; Vinícius Araújo 48'; Tezuka 50'		Takahashi 53'	Stadium: NHK Spring Mitsuzawa Football Stadium; Referee: Yusuke Ohashi

=== J.League Cup ===
24 April 2024 Group 9 Round 2	Roasso Kumamoto	0–1	Sagan Tosu	Kumamoto
19:00 UTC+9			Yokoyama 26'	Stadium: Egao Kenko Stadium

22 May 2024 Group 9 Round 3	Sagan Tosu	1–1 (a.e.t.) (4–5 p)	FC Tokyo	Tosu
19:00 UTC+9	Watanabe (yellow card) 13'; Marcelo Ryan (yellow card) 78', (goal) 90+1'; Kim Tae-hyeon (yellow card) 72' (yellow-red card) 97'		Koizumi (yellow card) 16'; Morishige 56'; Araki (yellow card) 90+1'; Harakawa (yellow card) 78' (yellow-red card) 105+2'	Stadium: Ekimae Real Estate Stadium; Referee: Keigo Sendachi
