= 2026–27 Gamba Osaka season =

Gamba Osaka
2026–27 season
- Chairman: Takashi Yamauchi
- Head coach: (Germany) Jens Wissing (till 10 July) (Japan) Tomokazu Myojin
- Stadium: Panasonic Stadium Suita
- AFC Champions League Elite: League Stage
Home colours	Away colours

The 2026–27 Gamba Osaka season is Japanese football club Gamba Osaka's 47th season in existence. They are playing in the 2026–27 AFC Champions League Elite after winning the 2025–26 AFC Champions League Two competition.

== Squad ==
Squad no.	Name	Nationality	Date of birth	Last Team
Goalkeepers
1	Masaaki Higashiguchi	(Japan)	12 May 1986 (age 40)	(Japan) Albirex Niigata
18	Rui Araki	(Japan)	14 October 2007 (age 19)	Youth Team
22	Jun Ichimori	(Japan)	2 July 1991 (age 35)	(Japan) Yokohama F. Marinos
31	Zhang Aolin ^{Type 2}	(Japan) (China)	25 May 2005 (age 21)	Youth Team
Defenders
2	Shota Fukuoka	(Japan)	24 October 1995 (age 31)	(Japan) Tokushima Vortis
3	Riku Handa	(Japan)	1 January 2002 (age 24)	(Japan) Montedio Yamagata
4	Shinnosuke Nakatani	(Japan)	24 March 1996 (age 30)	(Japan) Nagoya Grampus
5	Genta Miura	(Japan)	1 March 1995 (age 31)	(Japan) Shimizu S-Pulse
15	Takeru Kishimoto	(Japan)	16 July 1997 (age 29)	(Japan) Shimizu S-Pulse
19	Ikegaya Ginjiro	(Japan)	19 June 2004 (age 22)	(Japan) University of Tsukuba
21	Ryo Hatsuse	(Japan)	10 July 1997 (age 29)	(England) Sheffield Wednesday
25	Ali Camara	(Mali)	23 January 2002 (age 24)	(Portugal) Amora F.C.
28	Soya Fujiwara	(Japan)	9 September 1995 (age 31)	(Japan) Albirex Niigata
34	Yuya Yokoi	(Japan)	15 April 2008 (age 18)	Youth Team
67	Shogo Sasaki	(Japan)	25 July 2000 (age 26)	(Japan) JEF United Chiba
	Haruki Ozawa	(Japan)	18 April 2004 (age 22)	(Japan) Meiji University
Midfielders
7	Takashi Usami (c)	(Japan)	6 May 1992 (age 34)	(Germany) Fortuna Düsseldorf
8	Ryotaro Meshino	(Japan)	8 June 1998 (age 28)	(Portugal) Estoril
10	Shu Kurata	(Japan)	26 November 1988 (age 37)	(Japan) Cerezo Osaka
13	Shuto Abe	(Japan)	5 December 1997 (age 28)	(Belgium) R.W.D. Molenbeek
16	Tokuma Suzuki	(Japan)	12 March 1997 (age 29)	(Japan) Cerezo Osaka
27	Rin Mito	(Japan)	12 February 2002 (age 24)	(Japan) Kwansei Gakuin University
32	Yuki Yoshihara	(Japan)	19 July 2004 (age 22)	(Japan) Takushoku University
35	Taiki Tono	(Japan)	2 June 2007 (age 19)	Youth Team
39	Koshiro Sumi	(Japan)	13 August 2002 (age 24)	(Japan) Júbilo Iwata
47	Shinya Nakano	(Japan)	17 August 2003 (age 23)	(Japan) Shonan Bellmare
48	Yoshiki Fujimoto	(Japan)	2 April 2009 (age 17)	Youth team
60	Arata Okamoto	(Japan)	16 December 2009 (age 16)	Youth team
78	Juanpe	(Spain)	31 March 1996 (age 30)	(Spain) Málaga
Forwards
9	Daichi Hayashi	(Japan)	23 May 1997 (age 29)	(Germany) 1. FC Nürnberg
11	Issam Jebali	(Tunisia)	25 December 1991 (age 34)	(Denmark) Odense Boldklub
14	Asahi Uenaka	(Japan)	1 November 2001 (age 25)	(Japan) Yokohama F. Marinos
17	Ryoya Yamashita	(Japan)	19 October 1997 (age 29)	(Japan) Yokohama FC
20	Eli Adams	(Australia)	12 March 2002 (age 24)	(Australia) Newcastle Jets
23	Deniz Hümmet	(Turkey) (Sweden)	13 September 1996 (age 30)	(Sweden) Djurgårdens
24	Tsuyoshi Ogashiwa	(Japan)	9 July 1998 (age 28)	(Japan) FC Tokyo
37	Naru Nakatsumi	(Japan)	19 December 2007 (age 18)	Youth Team
41	Yusei Toshida	(Japan)	23 July 1999 (age 27)	(Japan) Tegevajaro Miyazaki
44	Kanji Okunuki	(Japan)	11 August 1999 (age 27)	(Germany) 1. FC Nürnberg
97	Welton Felipe	(Brazil)	23 May 1997 (age 29)	(Bulgaria) Levski Sofia
Players loan out
6	Makoto Mitsuta	(Japan)	20 July 1999 (age 27)	(Japan) Vissel Kobe
36	Takato Yamamoto	(Japan)	24 August 2007 (age 19)	Youth Team
38	Gaku Nawata	(Japan)	26 July 2006 (age 20)	(Japan) Kamimura Gakuen High School
40	Shoji Toyama	(Japan)	21 September 2002 (age 24)	(Japan) Tokyo Verdy
Players left during mid-season

Last updated: 10 March 2023.
Source: Gamba Osaka website

== Staff ==
Position	Name
Manager	(Germany) Jens Wissing (till 10 July) (Japan) Tomokazu Myojin
Coach	(Japan) Yasuhito Endō (Japan) Shota Uemura (Japan) Kazumichi Takagi
Goalkeeper coach	(Japan) Motohiro Yoshida
Physical coach	(Japan) Koichiro Yoshimichi
Analyst	(Japan) Kento Nashimoto
Assistant coach and interpreter	(Japan) Takanori Okai
Doctor	(Japan) Yusuke Enomoto
Physiotherapist	(Japan) Yuta Tanaka (Japan) Yuki Nakamura
Trainer and physiotherapist	(Japan) Ryosuke Kaji
Trainer	(Japan) Satoshi Ikeguchi (Japan) Shotaro Shinba
Interpreter	(Japan) Masaki Kimura (Japan) Kazushi Shimizu (Japan) Yu Ono
Side manager and competent	(Japan) Atsushi Hashimoto
Side manager and side affairs	(Japan) Junji Yamashita (Japan) Shunsuke Hitomi

== Transfers ==
=== In ===
Pre-season

Date	Position	Player	Transferred from	Fee	Ref
Permanent transfer
31 May 2026	FW	(Japan) Makoto Mitsuta	(Japan) Vissel Kobe	Return from loan	
17 June 2026	DF	(Japan) Haruki Ozawa	(Japan) Meiji University	Free	
2 July 2026	FW	(Australia) Eli Adams	(Australia) Newcastle Jets	Free	
23 August 2026	MF	(Spain) Juanpe	(Spain) Málaga	Free	
4 September 2026	MF	(Japan) Koshiro Sumi	(Japan) Júbilo Iwata	Free	
9 September 2026	FW	(Japan) Yusei Toshida	(Japan) Tegevajaro Miyazaki	Free	
10 September 2026	DF	(Mali) Ali Camara	(Portugal) Amora F.C.	Free	
14 September 2026	FW	(Japan) Tsuyoshi Ogashiwa	(Japan) FC Tokyo	Undisclosed	
15 September 2026	MF	(Japan) Soya Fujiwara	(Japan) Albirex Niigata	Undisclosed	

=== Out ===
Pre-season

Date	Position	Player	Transferred To	Ref
Permanent Transfer
30 April 2026	DF	(Germany) Philipp Max	N.A.	Mutual contract termination
30 June 2026	FW	(Japan) Harumi Minamino	(Japan) Urawa Red Diamonds	Undisclosed
3 July 2026	MF	(Japan) Jiro Nakamura	(Japan) Tochigi SC	Free
Loan Transfer
28 June 2026	FW	(Japan) Shoji Toyama	(Japan) Hokkaido Consadole Sapporo	Season loan
28 June 2026	FW	(Japan) Makoto Mitsuta	(Japan) Kashiwa Reysol	Season loan
7 July 2026	MF	(Japan) Takato Yamamoto	(Germany) Borussia Dortmund U23	Season loan
3 September 2026	MF	(Japan) Gaku Nawata	(Belgium) Charleroi	Season loan

== Pre-season friendlies ==
=== Tour of Austria ===
Win Draw Loss

11 July 1	Gamba Osaka (Japan)	0–3	(Czech Republic) Sparta Prague	Anif, Austria
		Report		Stadium: USK Anif Sportzentrum

15 July 2	Gamba Osaka (Japan)	3–0	(Austria) Red Bull Salzburg	Anif, Austria
		Report		Stadium: USK Anif Sportzentrum

== Competitions ==
=== J1 League ===
Pos	Team	Pld	W	D	L	GF	GA	GD	Pts	Qualification or relegation
16	V-Varen Nagasaki	14	3	4	7	17	22	−5	13	
17	JEF United Chiba	14	3	4	7	16	24	−8	13	
18	Gamba Osaka	14	2	6	6	16	24	−8	12	Relegation to the J2 League
19	Mito HollyHock	14	2	3	9	12	26	−14	9	Relegation to the J2 League
20	Avispa Fukuoka	14	2	2	10	14	25	−11	8	Relegation to the J2 League

Updated to match(es) played on 8 November 2026. Source: JLeague.jp,
Rules for classification: 1) Points; 2) Goal difference; 3) Goals scored; 4) Head-to-head points; 5) Head-to-head goal difference; 6) Head-to-head goals scored; 7) Fewer disciplinary points.

==== Matches ====
The matches were unveiled on 13 June.

7 August 2026 1	Gamba Osaka	4–3	Urawa Red Diamonds	Suita
19:30 JST	Issam Jebali 36'; Deniz Hümmet 45+7'; Welton Felipe 84'; Asahi Uenaka 86'	Report	Hiiro Komori 17'; Takurō Kaneko 78'; Harumi Minamino 80'; Matheus Sávio (yellow card) 11' (yellow-red card) 22'; Kotaro Hayashi (yellow card) 22'; Kōta Kudō (yellow card) 49'; Ado Onaiwu (yellow card) 83'	Stadium: Suita City Football Stadium; Attendance: 34,855; Referee: Akihiko Ikeuchi

15 August 2026 2	Mito HollyHock	1–1	Gamba Osaka	Mito
18:03 JST	Torikai 18'; Hayata (yellow card) 82'	Report	Nakatani 75'	Stadium: K's denki Stadium Mito; Attendance: 13,226; Referee: Jumpei Iida

22 August 2026 3	Nagoya Grampus	3–1	Gamba Osaka	Toyota
19:00 JST	Kimura 8'; Asano 83'; Mateus (yellow card) 87'; Ono 90+8'	Report	Ryotaro Meshino 11'; Takeru Kishimoto (yellow card) 40'; Deniz Hümmet (yellow card) 44'; Abe (red card) 86'	Stadium: Toyota Stadium; Attendance: 30,651; Referee: Koki Nagamine

29 August 2026 4	Gamba Osaka	0–0	Sanfrecce Hiroshima	Suita
18:00 JST	Issam Jebali (yellow card) 11'; Takeru Kishimoto (red card) 87'	Report	Hayao Kawabe (yellow card) 9'; Yotaro Nakajima (yellow card) 36'	Stadium: Suita City Football Stadium; Attendance: 30,075; Referee: Yusuke Araki

2 September 5	V-Varen Nagasaki	2–2	Gamba Osaka	Nagasaki
	Kenshin Yasuda 79'; Matheus Jesus 84'; Hotaru Yamaguchi (yellow card) 62'; Kanta Doi (yellow card) 66'	Report	Deniz Hümmet 90'; Issam Jebali 90+6'; Ryo Hatsuse (yellow card) 36'	Stadium: Peace Stadium Connected by SoftBank; Attendance: 18,015; Referee: Yoshimi Yamashita

6 September 6	JEF United Chiba	2–0	Gamba Osaka	Chiba
	Ken Yamura 1'; Takumi Tsukui 51'; Naohiro Sugiyama (yellow card) 56'; Hiroto Goya (yellow card) 68'	Report		Stadium: Fukuda Denshi Arena; Attendance: 11,316; Referee: Futoshi Nakamura

12 September 7	Gamba Osaka	0–2	FC Tokyo	Suita
		Report	Soma Anzai 38'; Motoki Nagakura 52'; Marcelo Ryan (yellow card) 78'; Hirokazu Ishihara (yellow card) 89'; Kashifu Bangunagande (yellow card) 90'	Stadium: Suita City Football Stadium; Attendance: 33,221; Referee: Yuto Sutani

20 September 8	Gamba Osaka	0–1	Vissel Kobe	Suita
	Shuto Abe (yellow card) 40'; Shinnosuke Nakatani (yellow card) 45+3'	Report	Erik 90'; Ryoya Yamashita (yellow card) 70'	Stadium: Suita City Football Stadium; Attendance: 35,884; Referee: Ryo Tanimoto

9 October 9 (Rescheduled)	Kashima Antlers	2–0	Gamba Osaka	Kashima
	Léo Ceará 45+7'; Yuma Suzuki 60'; Kim Tae-hyeon (yellow card) 55'	Report	Welton Felipe (yellow card) 55'; Ryoya Ogawa (yellow card) 84'	Stadium: Kashima Soccer Stadium; Attendance: 16,240; Referee: Takafumi Mikuriya

17 October 10	Shimizu S-Pulse	2–2	Gamba Osaka	Shizuoka
	Yuki Honda 9'; Kai Matsuzaki 42'; Hidehiro Sugai (yellow card) 47'; Takayuki Yoshida (yellow card) 75'	Report	Ryotaro Meshino 84'; Issam Jebali 90+6'; Ryoya Yamashita (yellow card) 23'; Ryo Hatsuse (yellow card) 25'	Stadium: IAI Stadium Nihondaira; Attendance: 15,865; Referee: Keigo Sendachi

21 October 11	Avispa Fukuoka	1–2	Gamba Osaka	Fukuoka
	Yu Hashimoto 75'; Yuma Tsujioka (yellow card) 27'; Kokoro Maeda (yellow card) 44'; Masato Yuzawa (yellow card) 46'	Report	Welton Felipe 50'; Takashi Usami 78'; Rin Mito (yellow card) 86'	Stadium: Best Denki Stadium; Attendance: 6,105; Referee: Masuya Ueda

24 October 12	Gamba Osaka	2–2	Kyoto Sanga	Suita
	Takashi Usami 31'; Issam Jebali 65' (yellow card) 90+7'; Jun Ichimori (red card) 53'	Report	Haruki Arai 39'; Takumi Kato 90+2'; Kyo Sato (yellow card) 33'	Stadium: Suita City Football Stadium; Attendance: 30,603; Referee: Koichiro Fukushima

1 November 13 (Rescheduled)	Machida Zelvia	0–0	Gamba Osaka	Tokyo
	Kim Min-Tae (yellow card) 83'	Report	Takeru Kishimoto (yellow card) 11'	Stadium: Machida GION Stadium; Attendance: 10,044; Referee: Ryo Tanimoto

8 November 14	Gamba Osaka	2–3	Cerezo Osaka	Suita
	Issam Jebali 55'; Eli Adams 81' (yellow card) 49'; Shota Fukuoka (yellow card) 38'	Report	Rikito Inoue 11'; Pablo Sabbag 64' (yellow card) 79'; Hayato Okuda 74' (yellow card) 39'; Jackson Irvine (yellow card) 35'; Lucas Fernandes (yellow card) 85'	Stadium: Suita City Football Stadium; Attendance: 36,042; Referee: Atsushi Kamimura

21 November 15	Gamba Osaka	0–1	Fagiano Okayama	Suita
	Deniz Hümmet (yellow card) 42'; Ryo Hatsuse (red card) 44'	Report	Kota Kawano 52'; Shu Ikedo (yellow card) 65'; Soichiro Mori (yellow card) 90+2'	Stadium: Suita City Football Stadium; Attendance: 26,550; Referee: Akihiko Ikeuchi

16 December 16 (Rescheduled)	Gamba Osaka	–	Kashiwa Reysol	Suita
		Report		Stadium: Suita City Football Stadium

29 November 17 (Rescheduled)	Kawasaki Frontale	–	Gamba Osaka	Kawasaki
		Report		Stadium: Kawasaki Todoroki Stadium

6 December 18	Gamba Osaka	–	Yokohama F. Marinos	Suita
		Report		Stadium: Suita City Football Stadium

12 December 19	Gamba Osaka	–	Tokyo Verdy	Suita
		Report		Stadium: Suita City Football Stadium

19 December 20	Gamba Osaka	–	Machida Zelvia	Suita
		Report		Stadium: Suita City Football Stadium

13 February 21	Cerezo Osaka	–	Gamba Osaka	Osaka
		Report		Stadium: Yodoko Sakura Stadium

20 February 22	Fagiano Okayama	–	Gamba Osaka	Okayama
		Report		Stadium: City Light Stadium

27 February 23	Gamba Osaka	–	Avispa Fukuoka	Suita
		Report		Stadium: Suita City Football Stadium

6 March 24	Gamba Osaka	–	Nagoya Grampus	Suita
		Report		Stadium: Suita City Football Stadium

10 March 25	Vissel Kobe	–	Gamba Osaka	Kobe
		Report		Stadium: Noevir Stadium Kobe

13 March 26	Gamba Osaka	–	V-Varen Nagasaki	Suita
		Report		Stadium: Suita City Football Stadium

20 March 27	Sanfrecce Hiroshima	–	Gamba Osaka	Hiroshima
		Report		Stadium: Edion Peace Wing Hiroshima

3 April 28	Gamba Osaka	–	Kawasaki Frontale	Suita
		Report		Stadium: Suita City Football Stadium

10 April 29	Tokyo Verdy	–	Gamba Osaka	Chōfu
		Report		Stadium: Ajinomoto Stadium

17 April 30	Gamba Osaka	–	JEF United Chiba	Suita
		Report		Stadium: Suita City Football Stadium

24 April 31	Kashiwa Reysol	–	Gamba Osaka	Chiba
		Report		Stadium: Sankyo Frontier Kashiwa Stadium

29 April 32	Kyoto Sanga	–	Gamba Osaka	Kyoto
		Report		Stadium: Sanga Stadium by Kyocera

3 May 33	Gamba Osaka	–	Kashima Antlers	Suita
		Report		Stadium: Suita City Football Stadium

9 May 34	Yokohama F. Marinos	–	Gamba Osaka	Yokohama
		Report		Stadium: Nissan Stadium

15 May 35	Gamba Osaka	–	Mito HollyHock	Suita
		Report		Stadium: Suita City Football Stadium

22 May 36	FC Tokyo	–	Gamba Osaka	Chōfu
		Report		Stadium: Ajinomoto Stadium

29 May 37	Gamba Osaka	–	Shimizu S-Pulse	Suita
		Report		Stadium: Suita City Football Stadium

6 June 38	Urawa Red Diamonds	–	Gamba Osaka	Saitama
		Report		Stadium: Saitama Stadium 2002

=== Emperor's Cup ===
26 August 2026 Round 2	Gamba Osaka	2–0	Reilac Shiga	Suita
19:04 JST	Usami 2', 17'; Uenaka (yellow card) 22'	Report	Maekawa (yellow card) 89'; Hirai (yellow card) 90+1'	Stadium: Suita City Football Stadium; Attendance: 6,873; Referee: Daichi Shiino

23 September 2026 Round 3	Gamba Osaka	5–0	Tokushima Vortis	Osaka
	Takashi Usami 19'; Ryoya Yamashita 57' (yellow card) 53'; Deniz Hummett 63'; Ikegaya Ginjiro 86'; Ryotaro Meshino 89'	Report	Taro Sugimoto (yellow card) 52'	Stadium: Suita City Football Stadium; Attendance: 9,016; Referee: Yoshimi Yamashita

9 December 2026 Rd of 16	Gamba Osaka	–	Urawa Red Diamonds	Osaka
				Stadium: Suita City Football Stadium

=== J.League Cup ===
3 October Rd 4	Kashiwa Reysol	5–4 (a.e.t.)	Gamba Osaka	Chiba
	Shōta Fujio 28', 59'; Yusuke Segawa 90+3' (pen.); Kenshin Yuba 103', 109'	Report	Issam Jebali 45+3' (pen.), 89'; Welton Felipe 73'; Shogo Sasaki 108' (yellow card) 90+1'; Shuto Abe (yellow card) 99'; Ryō Hatsuse (yellow card) 105'	Stadium: Sankyo Frontier Kashiwa Stadium; Attendance: 10,518; Referee: Hayato Shimizu

=== 2026–27 AFC Champions League Elite ===
==== Qualifying stage ====
11 August 2026 Playoff	Gangwon (South Korea)	0–1 (a.e.t.)	(Japan) Gamba Osaka	Gangwon, South Korea
19:30 UTC+9	Kim Dae-won (yellow card) 70'; Lee Gi-hyuk (yellow card) 89'; Shin Min-ha (yellow card) 98'	Report	Kishimoto (yellow card) 5'; Hatsuse (yellow card) 28'; Nawata 103'	Stadium: Gangneung Stadium; Attendance: 5,404; Referee: Salman Falahi (Qatar)

==== League stage ====
Pos	Team	Pld	W	D	L	GF	GA	GD	Pts	Qualification
1	(Japan) Vissel Kobe	4	4	0	0	8	3	+5	12	Advance to round of 16
2	(Japan) Kashima Antlers	4	3	1	0	11	1	+10	10	Advance to round of 16
3	(Japan) Gamba Osaka	4	2	2	0	11	6	+5	8	Advance to round of 16
4	(Japan) Kashiwa Reysol	4	2	1	1	8	3	+5	7	Advance to round of 16
5	(China) Shanghai Port	4	2	1	1	13	10	+3	7	Advance to round of 16

Updated to match(es) played on 4 November 2026. Source: AFC
Rules for classification: 1) points; 2) goal difference; 3) number of goals scored; 4) number of matches won; 5) penalty shoot-out if only two teams remain tied and played each other on the final matchday 6) fair play ranking; 7) drawing of lots

Win Draw Loss

15 September 2026 1	Gamba Osaka (Japan)	4–1	(Vietnam) Cong An Hanoi	Osaka, Japan
	Takashi Usami 29', 67'; Yusei Toshida 58'; Kohshiro Sumi 90+3'; Shota Fukuoka (yellow card) 90+5'	Report	Brayan Perea 78'; Stefan Mauk (yellow card) 22'	Stadium: Suita City Football Stadium; Attendance: 8,800; Referee: Asker Nadjafaliev (Uzbekistan)

13 October 2026 2	Newcastle Jets (Australia)	1–3	(Japan) Gamba Osaka	Newcastle, Australia
	Nikos Vergos 32'; Patrick Woods (yellow card) 86'; Ethan Debono (yellow card) 88'	Report	Yusei Toshida 40'; Deniz Hümmet 72'; Welton Felipe 86'; Tokuma Suzuki (yellow card) 66'; Takeru Kishimoto (yellow card) 90+3'	Stadium: McDonald Jones Stadium; Attendance: 3,219; Referee: Ahmad Al-Ali (Kuwait)

28 October 2026 3	Gamba Osaka (Japan)	1–1	(Thailand) Buriram United	Osaka, Japan
	Takashi Usami 66'; Ryo Hatsuse (yellow card) 87'	Report	Eduardo Mancha 39'	Stadium: Suita City Football Stadium; Attendance: 10,215; Referee: Zaid Thamer Mohammed (Iraq)

4 November 2026 4	Pohang Steelers (South Korea)	3–3	(Japan) Gamba Osaka	Pohang, South Korea
	Wanderson 55'; Jorge Teixeira 77'; Kim Gwang-won 89'; Park Chan-Yong (yellow card) 57'	Report	Ryotaro Meshino 34'; Eli Adams 69'; Kohshiro Sumi 79'; Soya Fujiwara (yellow card) 51'	Stadium: Pohang Steel Yard; Attendance: 2,853; Referee: Adel Al-Naqbi (United Arab Emirates)

25 November 2026 5	Gamba Osaka (Japan)	–	(Thailand) Port	Osaka, Japan
				Stadium: Suita City Football Stadium

2 December 2026 6	Jeonbuk Hyundai Motors (South Korea)	–	(Japan) Gamba Osaka	Jeonju, South Korea
				Stadium: Jeonju World Cup Stadium

9 February 2027 7	Ratchaburi (Thailand)	–	(Japan) Gamba Osaka	Ratchaburi, Thailand
				Stadium: Ratchaburi Stadium

16 February 2027 8	Gamba Osaka (Japan)	–	(South Korea) Daejeon Hana Citizen	Osaka, Japan
				Stadium: Suita City Football Stadium

== Team statistics ==
=== Appearances and goals ===
As of 8 Nov 2026

No.	Pos.	Player	J1 League		Emperor's Cup		J.League Cup		2026/27 AFC Champions League Elite		Total	
No.	Pos.	Player	Apps.	Goals	Apps.	Goals	Apps.	Goals	Apps.	Goals	Apps.	Goals
1	GK	(Japan) Masaaki Higashiguchi	2+1	0	1	0	1	0	0	0	5	0
2	DF	(Japan) Shota Fukuoka	9+1	0	1	0	1	0	2	0	14	0
3	DF	(Japan) Riku Handa	0	0	0	0	0	0	0	0	0	0
4	DF	(Japan) Shinnosuke Nakatani	16	1	2	0	1	0	3	0	22	1
5	DF	(Japan) Genta Miura	1	0	0	0	0	0	0	0	1	0
7	MF	(Japan) Takashi Usami	7+4	2	2	3	0+1	0	1+2	3	17	8
8	MF	(Japan) Ryotaro Meshino	9+4	2	0+1	1	1	0	3	1	18	4
9	FW	(Japan) Daichi Hayashi	0	0	0	0	0	0	0	0	0	0
10	MF	(Japan) Shu Kurata	3	0	1+1	0	0	0	1+2	0	8	0
11	FW	(Tunisia) Issam Jebali	8+3	5	0	0	1	2	1+3	0	16	7
13	MF	(Japan) Shuto Abe	14+1	0	2	0	1	0	3+1	0	22	0
14	FW	(Japan) Asahi Uenaka	2+2	1	1	0	0	0	0+1	0	6	1
15	DF	(Japan) Takeru Kishimoto	11+2	0	0+1	0	0	0	2+1	0	17	0
16	MF	(Japan) Tokuma Suzuki	7+1	0	2	0	0+1	0	1+1	0	13	0
17	FW	(Japan) Ryoya Yamashita	13	0	1	1	1	0	2+2	0	19	0
18	GK	(Japan) Rui Araki	3	0	0	0	0	0	1	0	4	0
19	DF	(Japan) Ikegaya Ginjiro	3	0	2	1	0+1	0	2	0	8	1
20	FW	(Australia) Eli Adams	3+8	1	1	0	0+1	0	2+1	1	16	2
21	DF	(Japan) Ryō Hatsuse	12+3	0	1+1	0	1	0	3	0	21	0
22	GK	(Japan) Jun Ichimori	11	0	1	0	0	0	3	0	15	0
23	FW	(Turkey) (Sweden) Deniz Hümmet	6+5	2	1	1	0	0	1+1	1	13	4
24	FW	(Japan) Tsuyoshi Ogashiwa	0+4	0	0	0	0	0	1	0	5	0
25	DF	(Mali) Ali Camara	0	0	0	0	0	0	0	0	0	0
27	MF	(Japan) Rin Mito	10+1	0	0	0	1	0	2+2	0	16	0
28	DF	(Japan) Soya Fujiwara	4+1	0	0	0	0	0	2	0	7	0
32	MF	(Japan) Yuki Yoshihara	0+3	0	0+2	0	0	0	0	0	5	0
34	DF	(Japan) Yuya Yokoi	0	0	0	0	0	0	0	0	0	0
35	MF	(Japan) Taiki Tono	0+1	0	0+1	0	0	0	0	0	2	0
37	FW	(Japan) Naru Nakatsumi	1+1	0	0+2	0	0	0	0+1	0	5	0
39	DF	(Japan) Kohshiro Sumi	3+4	0	0	0	1	0	0+2	2	10	2
41	FW	(Japan) Yusei Toshida	5+2	0	0	0	0	0	2	2	9	2
44	FW	(Japan) Kanji Okunuki	0	0	0	0	0	0	0	0	0	0
45	MF	(Japan) Kaita Maruoka	0	0	0	0	0	0	0	0	0	0
47	MF	(Japan) Shinya Nakano	4+6	0	1	0	1	0	2	0	14	0
48	MF	(Japan) Yoshiki Fujimoto	0	0	0	0	0	0	0	0	0	0
60	MF	(Japan) Arata Okamoto	0+2	0	0	0	0	0	0	0	2	0
67	DF	(Japan) Shogo Sasaki	3+6	0	1+1	0	0+1	1	1+1	0	14	1
78	MF	(Spain) Juanpe	0	0	0	0	0	0	2	0	2	0
97	FW	(Brazil) Welton Felipe	4+1	2	0	0	0+1	1	1+1	1	8	4
Players featured on a match for the team, but left the club mid-season, either permanently or on loan transfer
6	FW	(Japan) Makoto Mitsuta	0	0	0	0	0	0	0	0	0	0
36	MF	(Japan) Takato Yamamoto	0	0	0	0	0	0	0	0	0	0
38	MF	(Japan) Gaku Nawata	1+2	0	1	0	0	0	0+1	1	5	1
40	FW	(Japan) Shoji Toyama	0	0	0	0	0	0	0	0	0	0
