= Peter Deng =

South Sudanese footballer (born 1993)

Personal information
- Full name: Peter Nhial Deng
- Date of birth: 12 January 1993 (age 33)
- Place of birth: Nairobi, Kenya
- Height: 1.82 m (6 ft 0 in)
- Positions: Left back; centre-back

Team information
- Current team: Whittlesea Ranges

Youth career
- –2009: Adelaide Olympic

Senior career*
Years	Team	Apps	(Gls)
2009–2011	Adelaide Olympic	23	(0)
2012	Salisbury United	4	(0)
2012–2014	Adelaide Olympic	44	(9)
2014	Green Gully	7	(0)
2015	White City	3	(0)
2016	Pascoe Vale	5	(0)
2017–2018	Moreland Zebras	25	(0)
2019	Heidelberg United	13	(0)
2020	Eastern Lions	5	(0)
2021–	Whittlesea Ranges	13	(0)

International career^{‡}
2016–	South Sudan	4	(0)
- * Club domestic league appearances and goals as of 9 September 2021 ‡ National team caps and goals as of 9 September 2019

Peter Deng (born 12 January 1993) is a South Sudanese professional footballer who plays as a left back for Australian club Heidelberg United FC in the National Premier Leagues Victoria and the South Sudan national football team.

== Personal life ==
Deng was born on 12 January 1993 into a family of South Sudanese refugees in Nairobi, Kenya. He, along with his family, were fleeing from the conflict in South Sudan and eventually resettled in Australia when he was 10 years old.

His younger brother, Thomas Deng, played as a central defender for Melbourne Victory in the A-League and for the Socceroos. Their mother has always been supportive of the brothers' football careers and drove them around Adelaide dropping them off for training and matches.

Deng taught Physical Education at the Parkville Youth Justice Centre in 2019.

== Club career ==
After playing unorganised football in Kenya before moving to Australia, Deng played club football in Adelaide, first at Adelaide Blue Eagles and later at Adelaide Olympic.

After the family moved to Victoria, he played half a season with Green Gully in the National Premier Leagues Victoria (NPLV) with his brother Thomas. He played for another NPLV club, Heidelberg United FC, in 2019, before moving to the Eastern Lions in 2020.

He moved to Whittlesea Ranges FC in 2021.

== International career ==
Deng was called up by South Sudan for their 2017 Africa Cup of Nations qualification match against Benin on 27 March 2016.
