= Thomas Deng =

Professional footballer (born 1997)

Personal information
- Full name: Thomas Jok Deng
- Date of birth: 20 March 1997 (age 29)
- Place of birth: Nairobi, Kenya
- Height: 1.81 m (5 ft 11 in)
- Position: Centre-back

Team information
- Current team: Yokohama F. Marinos
- Number: 44

Youth career
- Adelaide Blue Eagles
- Playford City
- 2011–2013: Western Eagles

Senior career*
| Years | Team | Apps | (Gls) |
| 2013 | Western Eagles | 15 | (2) |
| 2014 | Green Gully | 13 | (0) |
| 2015–2016 | Melbourne Victory NPL | 10 | (0) |
| 2015–2020 | Melbourne Victory | 71 | (2) |
| 2016–2017 | → Jong PSV (loan) | 5 | (0) |
| 2020–2021 | Urawa Red Diamonds | 21 | (1) |
| 2022–2025 | Albirex Niigata | 64 | (0) |
| 2025– | Yokohama F. Marinos | 26 | (0) |

International career^{‡}
| 2015–2016 | Australia U20 | 10 | (0) |
| 2016–2021 | Australia U23 | 15 | (1) |
| 2018–2024 | Australia | 5 | (0) |
Medal record
Men's football
Representing Australia
AFC U-23 Asian Cup
| Third place | 2020 Thailand | U-23 Team |
- * Club domestic league appearances and goals as of 11 August 2026 ‡ National team caps and goals as of 18 March 2024

Thomas Jok Deng (born 20 March 1997) is a professional soccer player who plays as a central defender for J1 League club Yokohama F. Marinos. Born a South Sudanese refugee in Kenya, he has represented the Australia national team.

== Early life ==
Thomas Jok Deng was born 20 March 1997 into a family of South Sudanese refugees in Nairobi, Kenya. He and his family were fleeing the conflict in South Sudan, eventually settling in Adelaide, South Australia, in 2003, when Deng was six years old. His father remained in Kenya to serve as a doctor with Save the Children, and died in 2007. His family moved to Melbourne, Victoria in 2011.

Deng has four older siblings as well as a half-brother who lives in Uganda. His older brother, Peter Deng, has represented South Sudan at senior level.

Deng's first club, along with his good friend and fellow refugee Awer Mabil, was Adelaide Blue Eagles.

== Club career ==
=== Western Eagles ===
Deng made his senior football debut as a 16 year old in 2013 at Western Eagles under then-manager Srecko Barešić-Nikić in the Victorian State League Division 3.

=== Green Gully ===
The following season, the youngster moved to nearby Green Gully, where manager Bob Stojcevski recruited Deng to play for the club's u20 side. He was eventually promoted to the senior team and made 13 first team appearances in the NPL Victoria in 2014.

=== Melbourne Victory ===
Following his impressive performances at Gully, Melbourne Victory National Youth League coach Darren Davies rewarded Deng with a youth contract. Deng debuted for the senior team for Melbourne Victory against Balmain Tigers in the 2015 FFA Cup. He made his A-League debut on 9 October 2015 against Adelaide United, as a substitute replacing Fahid Ben Khalfallah after a red card was shown to Leigh Broxham. Thomas made his starting debut in the A-League for Melbourne Victory on 17 October 2015 in round 2 against town rivals, Melbourne City, where he was selected as Man of the Match by supporters and social media.

==== Jong PSV (loan) ====
In June 2016, Deng moved to Jong PSV on a one-year loan deal. After making five appearances, he returned to Melbourne Victory at the end of the season.

=== Urawa Red Diamonds ===
On 28 January 2020, Deng left Melbourne Victory to join Japanese club Urawa Red Diamonds following his wonderful performance at the 2020 AFC U-23 Championship. On 23 August in a league match against Vissel Kobe, he scored a goal in a 2–1 lost.

=== Albirex Niigata ===
On 9 January 2022, Deng moved to J2 League club Albirex Niigata. In his first season at the club, he helped them to win the J2 League title thus gaining promotion to the top tier J1 League in 2023. On 6 January 2024, Deng's contract was extended for the 2024 season.

=== Yokohama F. Marinos ===
In January 2025, Deng left Albirex Niigata to join fellow J1 League club, Yokohama F. Marinos.

== International career ==
A South Sudanese national at birth, Deng is eligible to play for Australia, Kenya and South Sudan.

Deng was part of the main squad of the Olyroos at the 2016 AFC U-23 Championship and put on an extremely impressive display throughout the tournament, garnering high praise from respected Australian pundits: Geoff Fullgrabe, Alan Vucenik, and Craig Foster.

In October 2018, Deng was named in the Socceroos squad for their training camp in the UAE and their friendly against Kuwait. In the friendly he made his debut, together with fellow South Sudanese refugee and boyhood friend Awer Mabil.

On 22 July 2021, Deng captained Australia in a historic 2–0 win over Argentina in the first group game of the 2020 Summer Olympics in Tokyo, also winning the Player of the Match award.

Deng was included in the Australian squad for the 2022 FIFA World Cup and the 2023 AFC Asian Cup but did not play a single match at both tournament.

== Other appearances ==
Deng has played in the African Nations Cup of South Australia.

== Career statistics ==
=== Club ===
As of 19 July 2026

Appearances and goals by club, season and competition
| Club | Season | League | | | National cup (Note: Includes FFA Cup and Emperor's Cup) | | League cup (Note: Includes J.League Cup) | | Continental | | Other | | Total | |
| Club | Season | Division | Apps | Goals | Apps | Goals | Apps | Goals | Apps | Goals | Apps | Goals | Apps | Goals |
|---|---|---|---|---|---|---|---|---|---|---|---|---|---|---|
| Western Eagles | 2013 | Victorian State League Division 4 | 14 | 2 | 0 | 0 | — | | — | | — | | 14 | 2 |
| Green Gully SC | 2014 | National Premier Leagues Victoria | 13 | 0 | 0 | 0 | — | | — | | — | | 13 | 0 |
| Melbourne Victory youth | 2015 | National Premier Leagues Victoria 1 | 9 | 0 | — | | — | | — | | 1 (Note: Appearance in National Premier Leagues Victoria play-offs) | 0 | 10 | 0 |
| Melbourne Victory | 2015–16 | A-League | 13 | 0 | 3 | 0 | — | | — | | — | | 16 | 0 |
| Melbourne Victory | 2017–18 | A-League | 24 | 2 | 0 | 0 | — | | 5 (Note: Appearance(s) in the AFC Champions League/AFC Champions League Elite) | 0 | — | | 29 | 2 |
| Melbourne Victory | 2018–19 | A-League | 28 | 0 | 2 | 0 | — | | 5 | 0 | — | | 35 | 0 |
| Melbourne Victory | 2019–20 | A-League | 6 | 0 | 1 | 0 | — | | — | | — | | 7 | 0 |
| Melbourne Victory | Total | | 71 | 2 | 6 | 0 | 0 | 0 | 10 | 0 | 0 | 0 | 87 | 2 |
| Jong PSV (loan) | 2016–17 | Eerste Divisie | 5 | 0 | — | | — | | — | | — | | 5 | 0 |
| Urawa Red Diamonds | 2020 | J1 League | 19 | 1 | — | | 0 | 0 | — | | — | | 19 | 1 |
| Urawa Red Diamonds | 2021 | J1 League | 2 | 0 | 1 | 0 | 3 | 0 | — | | — | | 6 | 0 |
| Urawa Red Diamonds | Total | | 21 | 1 | 1 | 0 | 3 | 0 | 0 | 0 | 0 | 0 | 25 | 1 |
| Albirex Niigata | 2022 | J2 League | 8 | 0 | 0 | 0 | — | | — | | — | | 8 | 0 |
| Albirex Niigata | 2023 | J1 League | 26 | 0 | 1 | 0 | 2 | 0 | — | | — | | 29 | 0 |
| Albirex Niigata | 2024 | J1 League | 30 | 0 | 0 | 0 | 3 | 0 | — | | — | | 33 | 0 |
| Albirex Niigata | Total | | 64 | 0 | 1 | 0 | 5 | 0 | 0 | 0 | 0 | 0 | 70 | 0 |
| Yokohama F. Marinos | 2025 | J1 League | 22 | 0 | 1 | 0 | 0 | 0 | 1 | 0 | — | | 24 | 0 |
| Yokohama F. Marinos | 2026 | J1 100 Year Vision League | 4 | 0 | — | | — | | — | | — | | 4 | 0 |
| Yokohama F. Marinos | Total | | 26 | 0 | 1 | 0 | 0 | 0 | 1 | 0 | 0 | 0 | 28 | 0 |
| Total | | | 223 | 3 | 9 | 0 | 8 | 0 | 11 | 0 | 1 | 0 | 252 | 3 |

=== International ===
As of 10 June 2025

Appearances and goals by national team and year
| National team | Year | Apps | Goals |
|---|---|---|---|
| Australia | 2018 | 1 | 0 |
| Australia | 2019 | 0 | 0 |
| Australia | 2020 | — | |
| Australia | 2021 | 0 | 0 |
| Australia | 2022 | 1 | 0 |
| Australia | 2023 | 1 | 0 |
| Australia | 2024 | 2 | 0 |
| Australia | Total | 5 | 0 |

== Honours ==
Melbourne Victory

- A-League Championship: 2017–18
- FFA Cup: 2015

Albirex Niigata

- J2 League: 2022
