= Rui Araki =

Japanese footballer (born 2007)

Rui Araki 荒木 琉偉
Personal information
- Birth name: 荒木 琉偉
- Date of birth: October 14, 2007 (age 19)
- Place of birth: Mie, Japan
- Height: 1.96 m (6 ft 5 in)
- Position: Goalkeeper

Team information
- Current team: Gamba Osaka
- Number: 18

Youth career
- Ise MTK FC
- –2025: Gamba Osaka

Senior career*
Years	Team	Apps	(Gls)
2026–	Gamba Osaka	10	(0)

International career^{‡}
2023	Japan U16	4	(0)
2023	Japan U17	1	(0)
2023	Japan U17	1	(0)
2024	Japan U19	4	(0)
2024–2025	Japan U20	4	(0)
2026–	Japan U23	8	(0)
Medal record
Men's football
Representing Japan
AFC U-23 Asian Cup
Winner	2026 Saudi Arabia
Asian Games
Silver medal – second place	2026 Aichi–Nagoya
- * Club domestic league appearances and goals as of 22 August 2026 ‡ National team caps and goals as of 3 October 2026

Rui Araki (荒木 琉偉, Araki Rui; born 14 October 2007) is a Japanese professional footballer who plays as a goalkeeper for J1 League club Gamba Osaka.

== Club career ==
Araki started his career at Gamba Osaka, where he helped the club win the AFC Champions League Two after a 1–0 victory over Al-Nassr in the final on 16 May 2026.

== International career ==
=== 2026 AFC U-23 Asian Cup ===
At the 2026 AFC U-23 Asian Cup, Rui Araki conceded only one goal during Japan U-23's campaign. The sole goal he allowed came in the quarter-final against Jordan U-23, which finished 1–1 after extra time. In the ensuing penalty shootout, Araki saved two attempts, helping Japan U-23 secure a 4–2 victory on penalties.

At 18 years old, Araki became the youngest goalkeeper to receive the Best Goalkeeper award at the AFC U-23 Asian Cup since the accolade was introduced in 2020.

== Career statistics ==
As of match played 22 August 2026

Appearances and goals by club, season and competition
Club	Season	League			National cup		League Cup		Continental		Total	
Club	Season	Division	Apps	Goals	Apps	Goals	Apps	Goals	Apps	Goals	Apps	Goals
Gamba Osaka	2026	J1 (100)	7	0	—		—		1 (Note: Appearances in AFC Champions League Elite)	0	8	0
Gamba Osaka	2026–27	J1 League	3	0	—		—		1	0	4	0
Career total			10	0	0	0	0	0	2	0	12	0

== Honours ==
Gamba Osaka

- AFC Champions League Two: 2025–26

Japan U23

- AFC U-23 Asian Cup: 2026

Individual

- AFC U-23 Asian Cup Best goalkeeper: 2026
