= Gaku Nawata =

Japanese footballer (born 2006)

Gaku Nawata 名和田 我空
Personal information
- Date of birth: 29 July 2006 (age 20)
- Place of birth: Miyakonojō, Miyazaki, Japan
- Height: 1.71 m (5 ft 7 1/2 in)
- Position: Forward

Team information
- Current team: Charleroi (on loan from Gamba Osaka)
- Number: 13

Youth career
- –2018: Konokawauchi SC
- 2018–2021: Kamimura Gakuen Junior High School
- 2022–2024: Kamimura Gakuen High School

Senior career*
Years	Team	Apps	(Gls)
2025–	Gamba Osaka	17	(2)
2026–	→ Charleroi (loan)	4	(0)

International career^{‡}
2023	Japan U17	10	(6)
2024	Japan U18	3	(1)
2025	Japan U23	2	(2)
- * Club domestic league appearances and goals as of 9 August 2026 ‡ National team caps and goals as of 6 September 2025

Gaku Nawata (名和田 我空, Nawata Gaku; born 29 July 2006) is a Japanese footballer who plays as a striker for Belgian Pro League club Charleroi on loan from J1 League club Gamba Osaka.

== Club career ==
Nawata began his career as a football player at Konokawauchi SC when he was an elementary school student. He achieved second place in the U-12 tournament in Miyazaki when he was in sixth grade.

In 2018, he enrolled in Kamimura Gakuen, which is known for its excellence in football. He won the national junior high school tournament and was the top scorer. And then, he skipped a grade to join the high school team, and he was a key player there.

On 15 December 2024, Nawata was announced at Gamba Osaka from the 2025 season.

On 3 September 2026, Belgian club Charleroi announced the signing of Gaku Nawata from Gamba Osaka on a loan deal with a buy option for the rest of the 2026-27 season.

== International career ==
In 2022, he was first called up to the Japan U-16. At 2023 AFC U-17 Asian Cup, he scored the most of all the players and led his national team to victory. He also won the MVP award for the tournament. On 11 October, he was named by English newspaper The Guardian as one of the best players born in 2006 worldwide.

In the same year, he has continued to represent Japan at 2023 FIFA U-17 World Cup. In the first game at the knockout round, he scored the equalizer against Spain, but Japan conceded a goal later and ended up in defeat.

== Career statistics ==
As of match played 11 October 2026

Appearances and goals by club, season and competition
Club	Season	League			National cup		League Cup		Continental		Other		Total	
Club	Season	Division	Apps	Goals	Apps	Goals	Apps	Goals	Apps	Goals	Apps	Goals	Apps	Goals
Gamba Osaka	2025	J1 League	4	0	—		2	0	2 (Note: Appearances in AFC Champions League Two)	2	—		8	2
Gamba Osaka	2026	J1 (100)	10	2	—		3	1	—		—		13	3
Gamba Osaka	2026–27	J1 League	3	0	1	0	—		1 (Note: Appearances in AFC Champions League Elite)	1	—		5	1
Gamba Osaka	Total		17	2	1	0	2	0	6	4	—		26	6
Charleroi (loan)	2026–27	Belgian Pro League	4	0	0	0	—		—		—		5	1
career total			21	2	1	0	2	0	6	4	0	0	30	6

== Honours ==
International

- AFC U-17 Asian Cup: 2023

Individual

- Top Goal Scorer AFC U-17 Asian Cup 2023: 5 goals
- Player of the Tournament AFC U-17 Asian Cup 2023
