= Eli Adams =

Australian soccer player

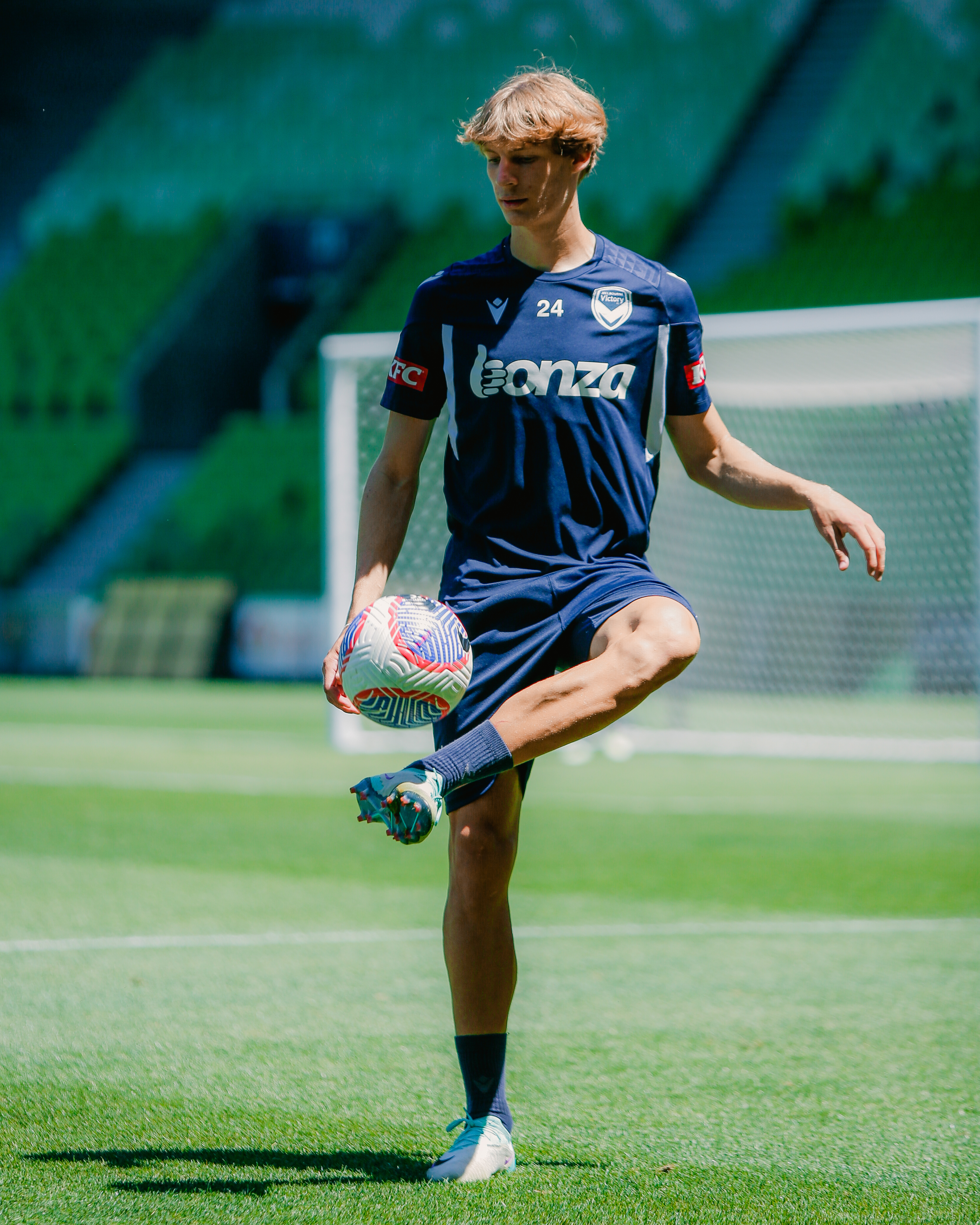
- Eli Adams training for Melbourne Victory, December 2023

Personal information
- Full name: Eli Adams
- Date of birth: 12 March 2002 (age 24)
- Place of birth: Toowoomba, Queensland, Australia
- Height: 1.83 m (6 ft 0 in)
- Position: Winger

Team information
- Current team: Gamba Osaka
- Number: 20

Youth career
- –2019: SWQ Thunder
- 2019–2020: SV Elversberg

Senior career*
Years	Team	Apps	(Gls)
2019	SWQ Thunder	1	(0)
2020–2022	Brisbane Roar NPL	36	(17)
2021–2022	Brisbane Roar	8	(0)
2022–2024	Melbourne Victory NPL	16	(9)
2022–2024	Melbourne Victory	15	(1)
2024–2026	Newcastle Jets	45	(17)
2026–	Gamba Osaka	9	(1)

International career^{‡}
2026–	Australia	1	(0)
- * Club domestic league appearances and goals as of 15 August 2025 ‡ National team caps and goals as of 13 November 2026

Eli Adams (/ˈilaɪ/ ee-LYE; born 12 March 2002) is an Australian professional soccer player who plays for J1 League side Gamba Osaka and the Australia national team.

== Club career ==
In the 2020/2021 season, Adams made his A-League debut with Brisbane Roar.

On 28 June 2022, Adams signed for A-League Club Melbourne Victory. He played with the team for two seasons, before switching to the Newcastle Jets.

On 18 September 2026, Adams was called up to represent the Australian Mens National Football Team.

== Career statistics ==
As of match played 28 September 2026

Appearances and goals by club, season and competition
Club	Season	League			Domestic Cup		League Cup		Continental		Total	
Club	Season	Division	Apps	Goals	Apps	Goals	Apps	Goals	Apps	Goals	Apps	Goals
SWQ Thunder FC	2019	NPL Queensland	1	0	–		–		–		1	0
Brisbane Roar Youth	2020	NPL Queensland	12	2	–		–		–		12	2
Brisbane Roar Youth	2021	NPL Queensland	23	14	–		–		–		23	14
Brisbane Roar Youth	2022	NPL Queensland	2	1	–		–		–		2	1
Brisbane Roar Youth	Total		38	17	–		–		–		38	17
Brisbane Roar	2020–21	A-League Men	1	0	0	0	–		–		1	0
Brisbane Roar	2021–22	A-League Men	7	0	1	0	–		–		8	0
Brisbane Roar	Total		8	0	1	0	–		–		9	0
Melbourne Victory Youth	2022	NPL Victoria 3	2	0	–		–		–		2	0
Melbourne Victory Youth	2023	NPL Victoria 3	5	3	–		–		–		5	3
Melbourne Victory Youth	2024	Victorian Premier League 1	9	6	–		–		–		9	6
Melbourne Victory Youth	Total		16	9	–		–		–		16	9
Melbourne Victory	2022–23	A-League Men	5	0	0	0	–		–		5	0
Melbourne Victory	2023–24	A-League Men	10	1	1	0	–		–		11	1
Melbourne Victory	Total		15	1	1	0	–		–		16	1
Newcastle Jets	2024–25	A-League Men	24	9	3	0	–		–		27	9
Newcastle Jets	2025–26	A-League Men	23	10	2	1	–		–		23	9
Newcastle Jets	Total		47	19	5	1	–		–		52	20
Gamba Osaka	2026–27	J.League	9	1	1	0	1	0	4	1	15	2
Career Total			131	45	8	1	1	0	4	1	144	47

== Honours ==
=== Team ===
Newcastle Jets

- Australia Cup: 2025
- A-League Premiership: 2025–26

=== Individual ===
- A-League Men Young Footballer of the Year: 2025–26
- A-League Men Goal of the Month: March 2025, December 2025
- Newcastle Jets A-League Men's Golden Boot: 2024–25
