= Koki Hasegawa =

Japanese footballer

Personal information
- Full name: Koki Hasegawa
- Date of birth: April 27, 1999 (age 27)
- Place of birth: Tokyo, Japan
- Height: 1.78 m (5 ft 10 in)
- Position: Defender

Team information
- Current team: Giravanz Kitakyushu
- Number: 4

Youth career
- FC Tokyo

Senior career*
| Years | Team | Apps | (Gls) |
| 2017–2022 | FC Tokyo | | |
| 2020–2022 | Juntendo University | | |
| 2022– | Giravanz Kitakyushu | 77 | (2) |
- * Club domestic league appearances and goals as of 24 August 2026

Koki Hasegawa (長谷川 光基, Hasegawa Koki; born April 27, 1999) is a Japanese football player who currently plays for Giravanz Kitakyushu.

== Career ==
Koki Hasegawa joined the J1 League club FC Tokyo in 2017.
