= Shosei Okamoto =

Japanese footballer

Shosei Okamoto 岡本 將成
Personal information
- Full name: Shosei Okamoto
- Date of birth: April 7, 2000 (age 26)
- Place of birth: Toyama, Japan
- Height: 1.84 m (6 ft 1/2 in)
- Position: Defender

Team information
- Current team: Kataller Toyama
- Number: 56

Youth career
- –2012: Tohri SC
- 2013–2018: Albirex Niigata

Senior career*
Years	Team	Apps	(Gls)
2018–2025	Albirex Niigata	10	(0)
2020	→ Kagoshima United (loan)	24	(0)
2021	→ Mito HollyHock (loan)	2	(0)
2022–2024	→ Kagoshima United (loan)	88	(0)
2026–	Kataller Toyama	20	(1)
- * Club domestic league appearances and goals as of 16 August 2026

Shosei Okamoto (岡本 將成, Okamoto Shōsei; born April 7, 2000) is a Japanese footballer who plays as a defender for J2 League club Kataller Toyama.

== Playing career ==
Okamoto was born in Toyama Prefecture on April 7, 2000. He joined J2 League club Albirex Niigata from youth team in 2018.

== Career statistics ==
=== Club ===
As of 13 May 2026

Appearances and goals by club, season and competition
Club	Season	League			National cup (Note: Includes Emperor Cup)		League cup (Note: Includes J.League Cup)		Total	
Club	Season	Division	Apps	Goals	Apps	Goals	Apps	Goals	Apps	Goals
Albirex Niigata	2018	J2 League	0	0	0	0	1	0	1	0
Albirex Niigata	2019	J2 League	10	0	0	0	0	0	10	0
Albirex Niigata	2021	J2 League	0	0	1	0	0	0	1	0
Albirex Niigata	2025	J1 League	0	0	0	0	2	0	2	0
Albirex Niigata	Total		10	0	1	0	3	0	14	0
Kagoshima United (loan)	2020	J3 League	24	0	0	0	0	0	24	0
Mito HollyHock (loan)	2021	J2 League	2	0	0	0	–		2	0
Kagoshima United (loan)	2022	J3 League	22	0	0	0	–		22	0
Kagoshima United (loan)	2023	J3 League	35	0	0	0	–		35	0
Kagoshima United (loan)	2024	J2 League	31	0	0	0	1	0	32	0
Kagoshima United (loan)	Total		88	0	0	0	1	0	89	0
Kataller Toyama	2026	J2/J3 (100)	15	1	–		–		15	1
Career total			139	1	1	0	4	0	144	1
