= Shunsuke Mito =

Japanese footballer (born 2002)

Shunsuke Mito 三戸 舜介
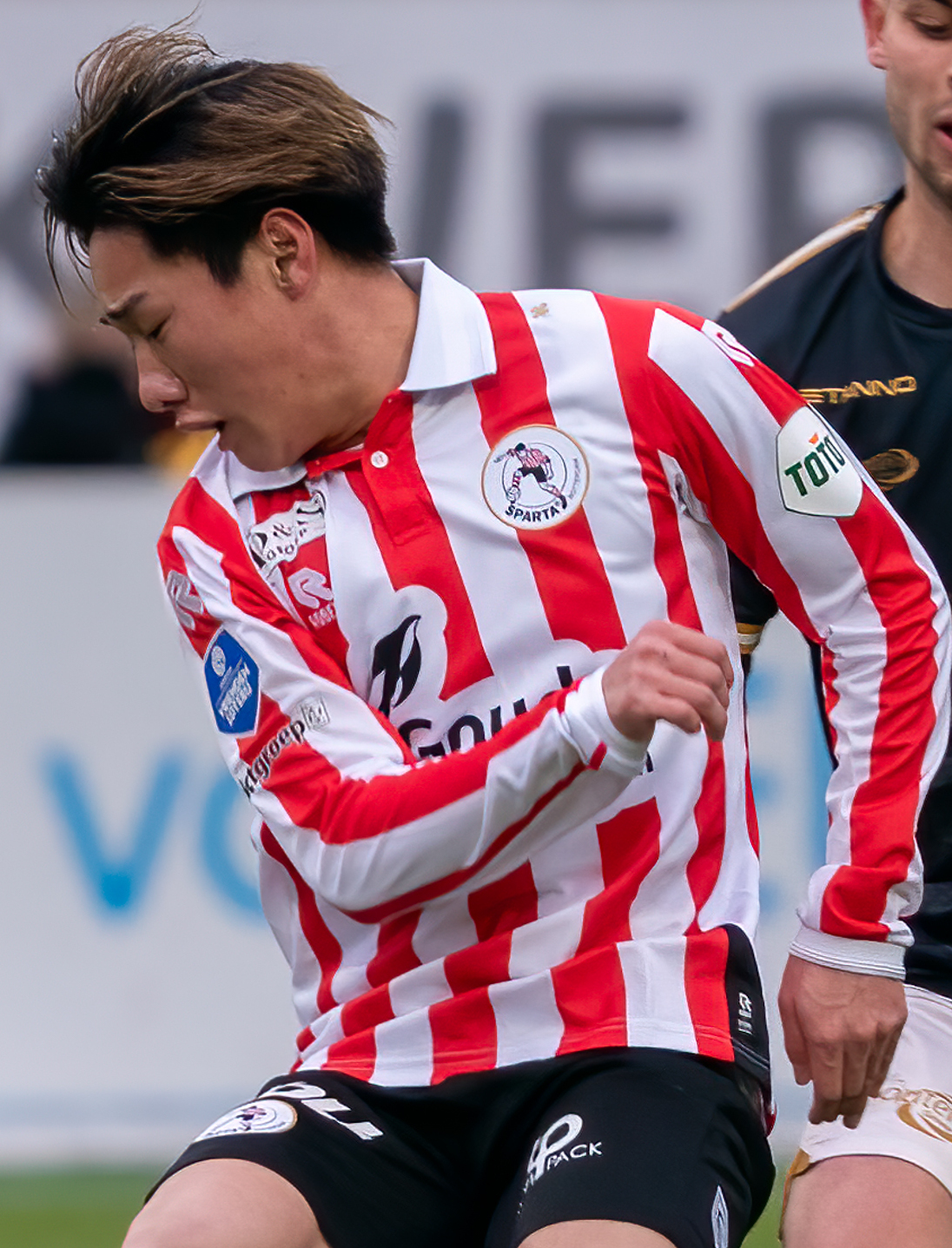
- Mito with Sparta Rotterdam in 2024

Personal information
- Full name: Shunsuke Mito
- Date of birth: 28 September 2002 (age 24)
- Place of birth: Yamaguchi, Japan
- Height: 1.63 m (5 ft 4 in)
- Position: Midfielder

Team information
- Current team: Sparta Rotterdam
- Number: 11

Youth career
- 2011–2014: Hara SSS
- 2015–2020: JFA Academy Fukushima

Senior career*
Years	Team	Apps	(Gls)
2020–2023	Albirex Niigata	80	(12)
2024–	Sparta Rotterdam	77	(14)

International career^{‡}
- Japan U15
2018	Japan U16	13	(2)
2019	Japan U17	3	(0)
2019–2022	Japan U18	8	(0)
2023–	Japan U22	2	(0)
2022–	Japan U23	13	(3)
2025–	Japan	1	(0)
- * Club domestic league appearances and goals as of 4 September 2026 ‡ National team caps and goals as of 10 June 2025

Shunsuke Mito (三戸 舜介, Mito Shunsuke; born 28 September 2002) is a Japanese professional footballer who plays as a midfielder for Eredivisie club Sparta Rotterdam and the Japan national team.

== Club career ==
On 21 December 2023, Mito signed a four-and-a-half-year contract with Eredivisie club Sparta Rotterdam. He scored on his debut on 13 January 2024, helping Sparta to a 2–0 away win over Fortuna Sittard.

== Career statistics ==
=== Club ===
As of match played 4 September 2026

Appearances and goals by club, season and competition
Club	Season	League			National cup (Note: Includes Emperor's Cup, KNVB Cup)		League cup (Note: Includes J.League Cup)		Other		Total	
Club	Season	Division	Apps	Goals	Apps	Goals	Apps	Goals	Apps	Goals	Apps	Goals
Albirex Niigata	2021	J2 League	25	2	2	1	0	0	—		27	3
Albirex Niigata	2022	J2 League	24	6	0	0	0	0	—		24	6
Albirex Niigata	2023	J1 League	31	4	3	0	1	0	—		35	4
Albirex Niigata	Total		80	12	5	1	1	0	—		86	13
Sparta Rotterdam	2023–24	Eredivisie	18	2	—		—		1 (Note: Appearance in Eredivisie play-offs)	0	19	2
Sparta Rotterdam	2024–25	Eredivisie	30	5	2	0	—		—		32	5
Sparta Rotterdam	2025–26	Eredivisie	24	8	2	2	—		—		26	10
Sparta Rotterdam	2026–27	Eredivisie	5	0	0	0	—		—		5	0
Sparta Rotterdam	Total		77	14	4	2	—		1	0	82	16
Career total			157	26	9	3	1	0	1	0	168	29

=== International ===
As of match played 10 June 2025

Appearances and goals by national team and year
National team	Year	Apps	Goals
Japan	2025	1	0
Total		1	0

== Honours ==
Albirex Niigata

- J2 League: 2022

Japan U16

- AFC U-16 Championship: 2018

Individual

- J.League Best Young Player: 2023
- Eredivisie Team of the Month: January 2025
