= Takeru Kishimoto =

Japanese footballer

Takeru Kishimoto 岸本武流
Personal information
- Full name: Takeru Kishimoto
- Date of birth: 16 July 1997 (age 29)
- Place of birth: Nara, Japan
- Height: 1.74 m (5 ft 9 in)
- Positions: Right winger; right back

Team information
- Current team: Gamba Osaka
- Number: 15

Youth career
- –2015: Cerezo Osaka

Senior career*
Years	Team	Apps	(Gls)
2016–2019	Cerezo Osaka	0	(0)
2016–2017	→ Cerezo Osaka U-23 (loan)	44	(15)
2018	→ Mito HollyHock (loan)	38	(3)
2019	→ Tokushima Vortis (loan)	23	(4)
2019–2021	Tokushima Vortis	90	(7)
2022–2023	Shimizu S-Pulse	44	(3)
2024–	Gamba Osaka	63	(6)
Medal record
Cerezo Osaka
Winner	J.League Cup	2017
Winner	Emperor's Cup	2017
Representing Japan
AFC U-19 Championship
Gold medal – first place	2016 Bahrain
- * Club domestic league appearances and goals as of 9 August 2026

Takeru Kishimoto (岸本 武流, Kishimoto, Takeru; born 16 July 1997 in Nara) is a Japanese professional footballer who plays as a right winger or a right back for J1 League club Gamba Osaka.

== Career ==
=== Cerezo Osaka ===
On 23 November 2015 it was announced that Kishimoto would be promoted to the first team next season.

=== Loan to Cerezo Osaka U-23 ===
On 12 March 2017, Kishimoto scored against Iwate Grulla Morioka in the 17th minute.

=== Loan to Mito Hollyhock ===
On 29 December 2017, it was announced that Kishimoto had joined Mito Hollyhock. On 25 February 2018, he won MOM for being involved in all three goals. Kishimoto scored his first goal against Zweigen Kanazawa on 15 April 2018, scoring in the 36th minute.

=== Loan to Tokushima Vortis ===
Kishimoto was loaned out from Cerezo Osaka to Tokushima Vortis for the 2019 season. He scored on his league debut against Kagoshima United on 24 February 2019, scoring in the 80th minute.

=== Tokushima Vortis ===
However, it was announced on 16 August 2019, that Tokushima Vortis had signed him permanently. He made his league debut against Avispa Fukuoka on 17 August 2019. Kishimoto scored his first league goal against Machida Zelvia on 25 November 2020, scoring in the 54th minute.

=== Shimizu S-Pulse ===
On 25 December 2021, Kishimoto was announced at Shimizu S-Pulse. He made his league debut against Hokkaido Consadole Sapporo on 19 February 2022. Kishimoto scored his first league goal against Montedio Yamagata on 9 September 2023, scoring in the 30th minute.

=== Gamba Osaka ===
On 28 December 2023, Kishimoto was announced at Gamba Osaka. He made his league debut against Machida Zelvia on 24 February 2024. Kishimoto scored his first league goal against Nagoya Grampus on 11 May 2024, scoring in the 67th minute.

== International career ==
On 27 October 2016, Kishimoto scored against Vietnam to take Japan to the final of the AFC U-19 Championship.

== Personal life ==
Kishimoto is married to actress and idol Ayako Mie.

== Club statistics ==
As of 23 April 2024.

Appearances and goals by club, season and competition
Club	Season	League			National cup		League cup		Total	
Club	Season	Division	Apps	Goals	Apps	Goals	Apps	Goals	Apps	Goals
Japan			League		Emperor's Cup		J. League Cup		Total	
Cerezo Osaka U-23	2016	J3 League	18	6	–		–		18	6
Cerezo Osaka U-23	2017	J3 League	26	9	–		–		26	9
Cerezo Osaka U-23	Total		44	15	0	0	0	0	44	15
Cerezo Osaka	2017	J1 League	0	0	0	0	3	0	3	0
Mito Hollyhock (loan)	2018	J2 League	38	3	1	0	–		39	3
Tokushima Vortis	2019	J2 League	36	4	1	0	–		37	4
Tokushima Vortis	2020	J2 League	39	2	2	0	–		41	2
Tokushima Vortis	2021	J1 League	36	5	2	0	2	0	40	5
Tokushima Vortis	Total		113	11	5	0	2	0	120	11
Shimizu S-Pulse	2022	J1 League	10	0	1	0	5	1	16	1
Shimizu S-Pulse	2023	J2 League	34 (Note: Includes two appearances in J1 play-offs)	3	1	0	4	1	39	4
Shimizu S-Pulse	Total		44	3	2	0	9	2	55	5
Gamba Osaka	2024	J1 League	5	0	0	0	0	0	5	0
Career total			244	32	8	0	14	2	266	34

== Honours ==
=== International ===
Japan U-19

- AFC U-19 Championship 2016

Gamba Osaka

- AFC Champions League Two: 2025–26
