= Shusuke Ota =

Japanese footballer

Shusuke Ota 太田 修介
Personal information
- Full name: Shusuke Ota
- Date of birth: February 23, 1996 (age 30)
- Place of birth: Kōfu, Japan
- Height: 1.76 m (5 ft 9 1/2 in)
- Position: Forward

Team information
- Current team: Shonan Bellmare
- Number: 28

Youth career
- 2002–2007: Ikeda SSS
- 2008–2013: Ventforet Kofu

College career
Years	Team	Apps	(Gls)
2014–2017	Nippon Sport Science University		

Senior career*
Years	Team	Apps	(Gls)
2018–2020	Ventforet Kofu	36	(6)
2021–2022	Machida Zelvia	77	(20)
2023–2025	Albirex Niigata	47	(8)
2025–	Shonan Bellmare	27	(2)
- * Club domestic league appearances and goals as of 14 August 2026

Shusuke Ota (太田 修介, Ōta Shūsuke; born February 23, 1996) is a Japanese footballer who plays as a forward for J2 League club Shonan Bellmare.

== Career ==
After rising through the Ventforet Kofu youth ranks and attending Nippon Sport Science University, Ota rejoined the club in 2018.

After three years at Kofu, Ota officially transferred to J2 club, Machida Zelvia on 28 December 2020. He left the club after two years at Machida.

On 22 December 2022, Ota joined newly promoted J1 League club Albirex Niigata for the 2023 season.

In July 2025, Ota transferred to fellow J1 League club Shonan Bellmare.

== Career statistics ==
As of 14 July 2025.

Appearances and goals by club, season and competition
Club	Season	League			National Cup		League Cup		Other		Total	
Club	Season	Division	Apps	Goals	Apps	Goals	Apps	Goals	Apps	Goals	Apps	Goals
Japan			League		Emperor's Cup		J. League Cup		Other		Total	
Ventforet Kofu	2018	J2 League	4	0	3	0	6	0	–		13	0
Ventforet Kofu	2019	J2 League	1	0	4	2	–		–		5	2
Ventforet Kofu	2020	J2 League	31	6	0	0	–		–		31	6
Ventforet Kofu	Total		36	6	7	2	6	0	0	0	49	8
FC Machida Zelvia	2021	J2 League	37	9	1	0	–		–		38	9
FC Machida Zelvia	2022	J2 League	40	11	1	0	–		–		41	11
FC Machida Zelvia	Total		77	20	2	0	0	0	0	0	79	20
Albirex Niigata	2023	J1 League	19	5	2	2	4	0	–		25	7
Albirex Niigata	2024	J1 League	17	2	0	0	4	2	–		21	4
Albirex Niigata	2025	J1 League	11	1	1	0	2	0	–		14	1
Albirex Niigata	Total		47	8	3	2	10	2	0	0	60	12
Shonan Bellmare	2025	J1 League	0	0	0	0	0	0	–		0	0
Career total			160	34	12	4	16	2	0	0	188	40
