= Hiroki Akiyama =

Japanese footballer (born 2000)

Personal information
- Date of birth: 9 December 2000 (age 25)
- Place of birth: Gunma, Japan
- Height: 1.75 m (5 ft 9 in)
- Position: Midfielder

Team information
- Current team: Darmstadt 98
- Number: 16

Youth career
- 2013–2015: Maebashi FC
- 2016–2018: Maebashi Ikuei High School

Senior career*
Years	Team	Apps	(Gls)
2019–2026	Albirex Niigata	118	(3)
2020	→ Azul Claro Numazu (loan)	8	(3)
2021	→ Kagoshima United (loan)	9	(1)
2025–2026	→ Darmstadt 98 (loan)	32	(3)
2026–	Darmstadt 98	0	(0)
- * Club domestic league appearances and goals as of 18 May 2026

Hiroki Akiyama (秋山 裕紀, Akiyama Hiroki; born 9 December 2000) is a Japanese professional footballer who plays as a midfielder for 2. Bundesliga club Darmstadt 98.

== Career ==
On 24 October 2018, Akiyama was announced at Albirex Niigata for the 2019 season. He made his league debut against Avispa Fukuoka on 10 October 2019. On 25 December 2019, Akiyama's contract was extended for the 2020 season. On 5 August 2020, Akiyama's total playing time exceeded the 900 minutes needed for a Pro A contract, so he signed a Pro A contract with the club. On 6 January 2021, he extended his contract for the 2021 season. Akiyama scored his first league goal for Albirex against Omiya Ardija on 25 September 2022, scoring in the 72nd minute. On 13 April 2024, Akiyama scored his first J1 League goal against Hokkaido Consadole Sapporo, scoring in the 80th minute - the goal was Albirex Niigata's 600th goal.

On 14 September 2020, Akiyama was announced at Azul Claro Numazu on a development type loan. He made his league debut against Fukushima United on 19 September 2020. Akiyama scored his first league goal against Cerezo Osaka U-23 on 22 September 2020, scoring in the 16th minute. On 28 October 2020, he was recalled from his loan.

On 13 August 2021, Akiyama was announced at Kagoshima United on a development type loan. He made his league debut against Kamatamare Sanuki on 28 August 2021. Akiyama scored his first league goal against Iwate Grulla Morioka on 11 September 2021, scoring in the 82nd minute. On 24 December 2021, it was announced that he would return to Albirex Niigata for the 2022 season.

On 16 July 2025, Akiyama joined Darmstadt 98 in 2. Bundesliga on loan with an option to buy. On 30 December 2025, Darmstadt announced they had triggered the buy-option for Akiyama, keeping the midfielder beyond the loan period.

== Style of play ==
Akiyama is a talented passer of the ball, being ranked 58th in the world at passing at one point.

== Personal life ==
On 11 January 2024, Akiyama announced that he had gotten married. On 5 September 2024, it was announced that he and his wife had had a daughter.

== Career statistics ==
As of 22 June 2021

Appearances and goals by club, season and competition
Club	Season	League			National cup		League cup		Other		Total	
Club	Season	Division	Apps	Goals	Apps	Goals	Apps	Goals	Apps	Goals	Apps	Goals
Albirex Niigata	2019	J2 League	6	0	0	0	0	0	0	0	6	0
Albirex Niigata	2020	J2 League	15	0	0	0	0	0	0	0	11	0
Albirex Niigata	2021	J2 League	0	0	1 (Note: Appearances in the Emperor's Cup)	0	0	0	0	0	1	0
Albirex Niigata	Total		21	0	1	0	0	0	0	0	22	0
Azul Claro Numazu (loan)	2020	J3 League	8	3	0	0	–		0	0	8	3
Career total			29	3	1	0	0	0	0	0	30	3
