= Yuzuru Shimada =

Japanese footballer (born 1990)

Yuzuru Shimada 島田 譲
Personal information
- Full name: Yuzuru Shimada
- Date of birth: 28 November 1990 (age 35)
- Place of birth: Mito, Ibaraki, Japan
- Height: 1.70 m (5 ft 7 in)
- Position: Midfielder

Team information
- Current team: Criacao Shinjuku
- Number: 10

Youth career
- Shinso Tokiwa SSS
- –2008: Kashima Antlers

College career
Years	Team	Apps	(Gls)
2009–2012	Waseda University		

Senior career*
Years	Team	Apps	(Gls)
2013–2016	Fagiano Okayama	103	(3)
2017–2020	V-Varen Nagasaki	72	(2)
2020	→ Albirex Niigata (loan)	37	(0)
2021–2024	Albirex Niigata	117	(4)
2025–	Criacao Shinjuku	0	(0)
- * Club domestic league appearances and goals as of 22:38, 31 January 2025 (UTC)

Yuzuru Shimada (島田 譲, Shimada Yuzuru; born 28 November 1990 in Mito, Ibaraki) is a Japanese footballer who plays as a midfielder for JFL club Criacao Shinjuku.

== Career statistics ==
=== Club ===
As of end of 2024 season

Appearances and goals by club, season and competition
Club	Season	League			National Cup		League Cup		Other		Total	
Club	Season	Division	Apps	Goals	Apps	Goals	Apps	Goals	Apps	Goals	Apps	Goals
Japan			League		Emperor's Cup		J. League Cup		Other		Total	
Fagiano Okayama	2013	J. League Division 2	22	1	2	1	–		–		24	2
Fagiano Okayama	2014	J. League Division 2	21	2	1	0	–		–		22	2
Fagiano Okayama	2015	J2 League	31	0	0	0	–		–		31	0
Fagiano Okayama	2016	J2 League	29	0	3	0	–		0	0	32	0
Fagiano Okayama	Total		103	3	6	1	0	0	0	0	109	4
V-Varen Nagasaki	2017	J2 League	37	2	0	0	–		–		37	2
V-Varen Nagasaki	2018	J1 League	20	0	2	0	2	0	–		24	0
V-Varen Nagasaki	2019	J2 League	15	0	4	0	6	1	–		25	1
V-Varen Nagasaki	Total		72	2	6	0	8	1	0	0	86	3
Albirex Niigata (loan)	2020	J2 League	37	0	0	0	–		–		37	0
Albirex Niigata	2021	J2 League	38	2	0	0	–		–		38	2
Albirex Niigata	2022	J2 League	33	2	1	0	–		–		34	2
Albirex Niigata	2023	J1 League	27	0	3	0	3	0	–		33	0
Albirex Niigata	2024	J1 League	19	0	1	0	4	0	–		24	0
Albirex Niigata	Total		117	4	5	0	7	0	0	0	129	4
Career total			329	9	17	1	15	1	0	0	361	11
