= Takuya Seguchi =

Japanese footballer (born 1988)

Takuya Seguchi 瀬口拓弥
Personal information
- Full name: Takuya Seguchi
- Date of birth: 30 November 1988 (age 37)
- Place of birth: Okayama, Japan
- Height: 1.87 m (6 ft 2 in)
- Position: Goalkeeper

Youth career
- 2007–2010: Ryutsu Keizai University FC

Senior career*
| Years | Team | Apps | (Gls) |
| 2011–2020 | Kamatamare Sanuki | 122 | (1) |
| 2020–2021 | Tokushima Vortis | 0 | (0) |
| 2021 | Albirex Niigata (loan) | 0 | (0) |
| 2022–2023 | Albirex Niigata | 0 | (0) |
- * Club domestic league appearances and goals as of 23:03, 29 January 2024 (UTC)

Takuya Seguchi (瀬口拓弥, Seguchi, Takuya; born 30 November 1988 in Okayama) is a Japanese former professional footballer who played as a goalkeeper. In a career spanning 13 years, he played over 100 games for Kamatamare Sanuki before going on to play for Tokushima Vortis and Albirex Niigata.

Following his contract expiring at the end of the 2023 season and his subsequent retirement, Seguchi was hired as a coach at Albirex Niigata.

== Career ==
In September 2011, Seguchi scored a goal in a 3–3 JFL draw with JEF United Chiba reserves, becoming the first goalkeeper to score in the history of the JFL.

== Club statistics ==
Appearances and goals by club, season and competition
| Club performance | | | League | | Cup | | Total | |
| Season | Club | League | Apps | Goals | Apps | Goals | Apps | Goals |
| Japan | | | League | | Emperor's Cup | | Total | |
|---|---|---|---|---|---|---|---|---|
| 2007 | Ryutsu Keizai University FC | JFL | 1 | 0 | 0 | 0 | 1 | 0 |
| 2011 | Kamatamare Sanuki | JFL | 32 | 1 | 1 | 0 | 33 | 1 |
| 2012 | Kamatamare Sanuki | JFL | 25 | 0 | 2 | 0 | 27 | 0 |
| 2013 | Kamatamare Sanuki | JFL | 33 | 0 | 1 | 0 | 34 | 0 |
| 2014 | Kamatamare Sanuki | J2 League | 28 | 0 | 1 | 0 | 29 | 0 |
| 2015 | Kamatamare Sanuki | J2 League | 0 | 0 | 1 | 0 | 1 | 0 |
| 2016 | Kamatamare Sanuki | J2 League | 0 | 0 | 1 | 0 | 1 | 0 |
| 2017 | Kamatamare Sanuki | J2 League | 4 | 0 | 0 | 0 | 4 | 0 |
| 2018 | Kamatamare Sanuki | J2 League | 0 | 0 | 0 | 0 | 0 | 0 |
| 2019 | Kamatamare Sanuki | J3 League | 0 | 0 | 1 | 0 | 1 | 0 |
| 2020 | Tokushima Vortis | J2 League | 0 | 0 | 0 | 0 | 0 | 0 |
| 2021 | Tokushima Vortis | J1 League | 0 | 0 | 0 | 0 | 0 | 0 |
| 2021 | Albirex Niigata (loan) | J2 League | 0 | 0 | 0 | 0 | 0 | 0 |
| 2022 | Albirex Niigata | J2 League | 0 | 0 | 0 | 0 | 0 | 0 |
| 2023 | Albirex Niigata | J1 League | 0 | 0 | 1 | 0 | 1 | 0 |
| Career total | | | 123 | 1 | 9 | 0 | 132 | 1 |
