= Yuto Horigome (footballer) =

Japanese footballer (born 1994)

Yuto Horigome 堀米 悠斗
Personal information
- Full name: Yuto Horigome
- Date of birth: 9 September 1994 (age 32)
- Place of birth: Sapporo, Hokkaido, Japan
- Height: 1.68 m (5 ft 6 in)
- Position: Left back

Team information
- Current team: Hokkaido Consadole Sapporo
- Number: 31

Youth career
- –2012: Hokkaido Consadole Sapporo

Senior career*
Years	Team	Apps	(Gls)
2013–2016	Hokkaido Consadole Sapporo	78	(1)
2014	→ Fukushima United (loan)	18	(0)
2017–2025	Albirex Niigata	232	(6)
2026–	Hokkaido Consadole Sapporo	11	(0)
- * Club domestic league appearances and goals as of 11:42, 13 May 2026 (UTC)

Yuto Horigome (堀米 悠斗, Horigome Yūto; born 9 September 1994) is a Japanese professional footballer who plays as a left back for J2 League club Hokkaido Consadole Sapporo.

== Club career ==
Horigome made his league debut for Consadole Sapporo against Gamba Osaka on the 31 March 2013. He scored his first league goal for the club against Tochigi on the 23 November 2015, scoring in the 57th minute.

On 21 December 2016, Horigome was announced at Albirex Niigata. He made his league debut for Albirex against Urawa Red Diamonds on the 14 May 2017. On 26 December 2019, it was announced that the club had extended Horigome's contract for the 2019 season. He scored his first league goal for the club against Kyoto Sanga on the 10 October 2020, scoring in the 75th minute. On 31 December 2020, Horigome's contract was extended for the 2021 season. On 31 December 2021, his contract was extended for the 2022 season. On 30 December 2022, it was announced that the club had extended Horigome's contract for the 2023 season. On 20 December 2023, his contract was extended for the 2024 season. On 21 December 2024, Horigome's contract was extended for the 2025 season.

Horigome was part of the 2022 J2 2022 J2 League Bext XI.

== Personal life ==
On 25 July 2021, Horigome started to rapidly gain followers on Twitter, as his name was only one kanji different from Yuto Horigome, who had just won the gold in the men's street skateboarding event at the 2020 Summer Olympics. The footballer Horigome directed his new followers to the skateboarder's account instead.

== Club statistics ==
As of 13 May 2026.

Appearances and goals by club, season and competition
Club	Season	League			National cup (Note: Includes Emperor Cup)		League cup (Note: Includes J.League Cup)		Total	
Club	Season	Division	Apps	Goals	Apps	Goals	Apps	Goals	Apps	Goals
Hokkaido Consadole Sapporo	2013	J.League Division 2	9	0	3	0	–		10	0
Hokkaido Consadole Sapporo	2015	J2 League	36	1	1	0	–		36	1
Hokkaido Consadole Sapporo	2016	J2 League	33	0	2	0	–		33	0
Hokkaido Consadole Sapporo	Total		78	1	6	0	0	0	84	1
Fukushima United (loan)	2014	J3 League	18	0	1	0	–		19	0
Albirex Niigata	2017	J1 League	24	0	0	0	4	0	28	0
Albirex Niigata	2018	J2 League	6	0	0	0	2	0	8	0
Albirex Niigata	2019	J2 League	22	0	0	0	0	0	22	0
Albirex Niigata	2020	J2 League	33	3	0	0	0	0	33	3
Albirex Niigata	2021	J2 League	41	1	1	0	0	0	42	1
Albirex Niigata	2022	J2 League	40	1	0	0	0	0	40	1
Albirex Niigata	2023	J1 League	20	0	1	0	1	0	22	0
Albirex Niigata	2024	J1 League	20	0	2	0	2	0	24	0
Albirex Niigata	2025	J1 League	26	1	1	0	1	0	28	1
Albirex Niigata	Total		232	6	5	0	10	0	247	6
Hokkaido Consadole Sapporo	2026	J2/J3 (100)	11	0	0	0	–		11	0
Career total			339	7	12	0	10	0	361	7

== Honours ==
Hokkaido Consadole Sapporo

- J2 League: 2016

Albirex Niigata

- J2 League : 2022

Individual

- J2 League Best XI: 2022
