= Gustavo Nescau =

Brazilian footballer (born 2000)

- Gustavo Nescau in 2026

Personal information
- Full name: Gustavo Henrique Alves Silva
- Date of birth: 12 March 2000 (age 26)
- Place of birth: Piracicaba, Brazil
- Height: 1.89 m (6 ft 2 in)
- Position: Forward

Team information
- Current team: Bucheon
- Number: 99

Youth career
- 2019: Rio Claro
- 2019–2020: Marília

Senior career*
Years	Team	Apps	(Gls)
2020–2021	Marília	18	(7)
2021	→ Cuiabá (loan)	0	(0)
2021–2025	Cuiabá	5	(0)
2022	→ Santo André (loan)	10	(1)
2023	→ Albirex Niigata (loan)	8	(0)
2024	→ Ferroviária (loan)	0	(0)
2024	→ Água Santa (loan)	10	(1)
2025–2026	Caxias	23	(3)
2026	Capital	2	(2)
2026–	Bucheon	6	(0)
- * Club domestic league appearances and goals as of 30 January 2026

Gustavo Henrique Alves Silva (born 12 March 2000), known as Gustavo Nescau or simply Gustavo, is a Brazilian professional footballer who plays as a forward for Bucheon FC 1995.

== Club career ==
Born in Piracicaba, São Paulo, Gustavo only joined a youth setup in 2019 with Rio Claro, at the age of 19. He was subsequently invited to join the under-20 side of Marília, where he impressed and was promoted to the main squad for the 2020 season.

Gustavo made his senior debut on 2 October 2020, coming on as a late substitute in a 1–1 Campeonato Paulista Série A3 home draw against Desportivo Brasil. In the 2020 Copa Paulista, he became a regular starter, scoring eight goals and being the competition's top goalscorer as his side reached the Finals.

After a frustrated negotiation with an Emirati club, Gustavo was again Marília's top scorer in the 2021 Paulista Série A3, with seven goals. On 3 June 2021, he moved to Série A side Cuiabá on loan until December.

On 17 September 2021, after impressing with the under-23 side, Gustavo signed a permanent three-year contract with the Dourado. He made his top flight debut three days later, replacing Rafael Elias in a 2–2 home draw against Fluminense.

On 14 January 2023, Nescau announcement officially signing transfer to J1 promoted club, Albirex Niigata for ahead of 2023 season.

== Career statistics ==
=== Club ===
As of the start from 2023 season.

Club	Season	League			State League		Cup		League Cup		Continental		Other		Total	
Club	Season	Division	Apps	Goals	Apps	Goals	Apps	Goals	Apps	Goals	Apps	Goals	Apps	Goals	Apps	Goals
Marília	2020	Paulista A3	—		1	0	—		—		—		14 (Note: Appearance(s) in Copa Paulista)	8	15	8
Marília	2021	Paulista A3	—		17	7	1	0	—		—		0	0	18	7
Marília	Total		—		18	7	1	0	—		—		14	8	33	15
Cuiabá	2021	Série A	2	0	—		—		—		—		9 (Note: Eight appearances and six goals in Copa FMF, one appearance in Copa Verde)	6	11	6
Cuiabá	2022	Série A	0	0	—		—		—		2 (Note: Appearance(s) in Copa Sudamericana)	0	—		2	0
Cuiabá	Total		2	0	—		—		—		2	0	9	6	13	6
Santo André (loan)	2022	Série D	0	0	10	1	—		—		—		—		10	1
Albirex Niigata (loan)	2023	J1 League	0	0	—		0	0	—		0	0	—		0	0
Career total			2	0	28	8	1	0	0	0	2	0	23	14	56	22
