= Eitarō Matsuda =

Japanese footballer (born 2001)

Eitarō Matsuda 松田 詠太郎
Personal information
- Date of birth: 20 May 2001 (age 25)
- Place of birth: Yokohama, Japan
- Height: 1.70 m (5 ft 7 in)
- Position: Winger

Team information
- Current team: Roasso Kumamoto
- Number: 22

Youth career
- Onari SSS
- –2020: Yokohama F. Marinos

Senior career*
Years	Team	Apps	(Gls)
2020–2025	Yokohama F. Marinos	15	(0)
2020	→ SC Sagamihara (loan)	7	(1)
2021	→ Omiya Ardija (loan)	10	(0)
2022–2024	→ Albirex Niigata (loan)	82	(5)
2025	→ Sagan Tosu (loan)	10	(0)
2026–	Roasso Kumamoto	21	(0)

International career^{‡}
2018	Japan U17	3	(1)
2019	Japan U18	2	(0)
- * Club domestic league appearances and goals as of 23 August 2026 ‡ National team caps and goals as of 17:04, 13 November 2020 (UTC)

Eitarō Matsuda (松田 詠太郎, Matsuda Eitarō; born 20 May 2001) is a Japanese footballer who plays as a winger for J3 League club Roasso Kumamoto.

== Career ==
On 13 November 2019, Matsuda was promoted to the first team from the 2020 season. On 9 January 2020, he was announced at SC Sagamihara on loan. Matsuda made his debut for Sagamihara against YSCC Yokohama on 27 June 2020. He scored his first league goal against Fujieda MYFC on 4 July 2020, scoring in the 63rd minute.

On 3 August 2020, Matsuda returned to Yokohama F. Marinos. He made his league debut against Kashiwa Reysol on 8 August 2020.

On 8 January 2021, Matsuda was announced at Omiya Ardija on loan. He made his league debut against Mito HollyHock on 28 February 2021.

On 21 December 2021, Matsuda was announced at Albirex Niigata on loan. He made his league debut against Omiya Ardija on 26 February 2022. Matsuda scored his first league goal against Iwate Grulla Morioka on 27 April 2022, scoring in the 44th minute. On 14 December 2022, his loan was extended for the 2023 season. On 27 December 2023, his loan contract was extended for the 2024 season.

After spending four seasons on loan, Matsuda rejoined Yokohama F. Marinos for the 2025 season.

== International career ==
On 19 February 2018, Matsuda was called up to the Japan U17s. On 29 May 2019, he was called up to the Japan U18s.

== Career statistics ==
=== Club ===
As of end of 2024 season.

Appearances and goals by club, season and competition
Club	Season	League			National Cup		League Cup		Other		Total	
Club	Season	Division	Apps	Goals	Apps	Goals	Apps	Goals	Apps	Goals	Apps	Goals
Japan			League		Emperor's Cup		J. League Cup		Other		Total	
Yokohama F. Marinos	2020	J1 League	15	0	0	0	0	0	1 (Note: Appearance in the AFC Champions League)	0	31	1
SC Sagamihara (loan)	2020	J3 League	7	1	0	0	–		–		7	1
Omiya Ardija (loan)	2021	J2 League	10	0	1	0	–		–		11	0
Albirex Niigata (loan)	2022	J2 League	38	4	1	0	–		–		39	4
Albirex Niigata (loan)	2023	J1 League	21	0	4	0	5	2	–		30	2
Albirex Niigata (loan)	2024	J1 League	23	1	2	0	4	0	–		29	1
Albirex Niigata (loan)	Total		82	5	7	0	9	2	0	0	98	7
Career total			114	6	8	0	9	2	1	0	147	9
