= Naoto Arai =

Japanese footballer (born 1996)

Naoto Arai 新井 直人
Personal information
- Date of birth: 7 October 1996 (age 30)
- Place of birth: Setagaya, Tokyo, Japan
- Height: 1.73 m (5 ft 8 in)
- Position: Right-back

Team information
- Current team: Sanfrecce Hiroshima
- Number: 5

Youth career
- Kitazawa Kickers
- FC Shibuya
- 2012–2014: Jissen Gakuen High School

College career
Years	Team	Apps	(Gls)
2015–2018	Niigata University of Management		

Senior career*
Years	Team	Apps	(Gls)
2019–2021	Albirex Niigata	57	(1)
2021–2023	Cerezo Osaka	6	(0)
2022−2023	→ Tokushima Vortis (loan)	38	(2)
2023–2024	Albirex Niigata	27	(3)
2024–	Sanfrecce Hiroshima	77	(11)
- * Club domestic league appearances and goals as of 9 August 2026

Naoto Arai (新井 直人, Arai Naoto; born 7 October 1996) is a Japanese professional footballer who plays as a right-back for J1 League club Sanfrecce Hiroshima.

Arai has spent most of his career playing in the J1 League and the J2 League, mainly for Albirex Niigata. He has also spent time at Cerezo Osaka, Tokushima Vortis and Sanfreece Hiroshima.

== Career ==
On 9 February 2019, Arai was announced at Albirex Niigata, after joining from the Niigata University of Management. He made his debut against Kyoto Sanga on 24 February 2019, playing the full 90 minutes. Arai scored his first professional goal against JEF United Chiba on 3 March 2019, scoring in the 90th+5th minute. After playing the required 900 minutes, Arai's contract was changed from a Professional C contract to a Professional A contract on 13 June 2019.

On 21 December 2020, Arai was announced at Cerezo Osaka on a permanent transfer. He played in 57 league matches for Albirex Niigata.

On 7 January 2022, Arai was announced at Tokushima Vortis on a one year loan. On 2 December 2022, Arai's loan with Tokushima Vortis expired. He played in 38 games and scored 2 goals for the club during his time there.

On 2 December 2022, Arai returned to Albirex Niigata on a permanent transfer.

On 21 March 2024, Arai was announced at Sanfreece Hiroshima on a permanent transfer. He scored his first career hattrick, scoring against Kyoto Sanga on 19 May 2024.

During his time at Sanfreece Hiroshima, Arai won the 2025 Japanese Super Cup. He was substituted on in the 89th minute for Shuto Nakano.

== Honours ==
Sanfrecce Hiroshima

- J.League Cup: 2025
- Japanese Super Cup: 2025
