= Kaito Taniguchi =

Japanese footballer (born 1995)

Kaito Taniguchi 谷口 海斗
Personal information
- Date of birth: 7 September 1995 (age 31)
- Place of birth: Kihoku, Mie, Japan
- Height: 1.76 m (5 ft 9 in)
- Position: Forward

Team information
- Current team: Mito HollyHock

Youth career
- Miyama FC
- –2010: Kishu Esforco
- 2011–2013: Yokkaichi Chuo Kogyo High School

College career
Years	Team	Apps	(Gls)
2014–2017	Gifu Keizai University		

Senior career*
Years	Team	Apps	(Gls)
2018–2019	Iwate Grulla Morioka	55	(24)
2020–2021	Roasso Kumamoto	34	(18)
2021–2026	Albirex Niigata	153	(37)
2026	Central Coast Mariners	7	(0)
2026–	Mito HollyHock	0	(0)
- * Club domestic league appearances and goals as of 4 April 2026

Kaito Taniguchi (谷口 海斗, Taniguchi Kaito; born 7 September 1995) is a Japanese professional footballer who plays as a forward for J1 League club Mito HollyHock.

== Career ==
Taniguchi attended Gifu Keizai University, where he served as a captain and was transformed from a centre-back to a forward. He then joined Grulla Morioka for 2018 season. Taniguchi was sidelined with injury during the early season. He made his league debut against Fujieda MYFC on 20 May 2018. Taniguchi scored his first league goal against Giravanz Kitakyushu on 10 June 2018.

On 23 December 2019, Taniguchi was announced at Roasso Kumamoto. He scored on his league debut on 27 June 2020 against Kagoshima United, scoring in the 15th and 64th minute. During his time at the club, he scored 18 goals in 34 games, becoming the J3 top scorer in the 2020 season.

On 30 December 2020, Taniguchi was announced at Albirex Niigata. He made his league debut against Giravanz Kitakyushu on 27 February 2021. Taniguchi scored his first league goal against Ehime on 24 April 2021, scoring in the 12th minute. On 14 December 2021, it was announced that the club had extended his contract for the 2022 season. On 10 December 2022, Taniguchi's contract was extended for the 2023 season. On 31 December 2023, his contract was extended for the 2024 season.

On 16 April 2024, Taniguchi won the 2024 Meiji Yasuda J1 League Monthly Best Goal award for February and March.

== Club statistics ==
As of match played 19 July 2023

Appearances and goals by club, season and competition
Club	Season	League			Emperor's Cup		J.League Cup		Total	
Club	Season	Division	Apps	Goals	Apps	Goals	Apps	Goals	Apps	Goals
Iwate Grulla Morioka	2018	J3 League	23	15	1	0	—		24	15
Iwate Grulla Morioka	2019	J3 League	32	9	2	1	—		34	10
Iwate Grulla Morioka	Total		55	24	3	1	—		46	10
Roasso Kumamoto	2020	J3 League	34	18	0	0	—		34	18
Albirex Niigata	2021	J2 League	42	13	1	0	—		43	13
Albirex Niigata	2022	J2 League	36	9	1	0	—		37	9
Albirex Niigata	2023	J1 League	16	3	1	0	4	1	21	4
Albirex Niigata	Total		94	25	3	0	4	1	101	26
Career total			183	67	6	1	4	1	193	69
