= Soya Fujiwara =

Japanese footballer (born 1995)

Soya Fujiwara 藤原奏哉
Personal information
- Full name: Soya Fujiwara
- Date of birth: September 9, 1995 (age 31)
- Place of birth: Yamaguchi, Japan
- Height: 1.69 m (5 ft 6 1/2 in)
- Position: Midfielder

Team information
- Current team: Gamba Osaka
- Number: 28

Youth career
- –2010: Renofa Yamaguchi
- 2011–2013: Luther Gakuin High School

College career
Years	Team	Apps	(Gls)
2014–2017	Hannan University		

Senior career*
Years	Team	Apps	(Gls)
2018–2020	Giravanz Kitakyushu	72	(3)
2021–2026	Albirex Niigata	201	(11)
2026–	Gamba Osaka	3	(0)
- * Club domestic league appearances and goals as of 14:50, 29 October 2026 (UTC)

Soya Fujiwara (藤原奏哉, Fujiwara Soya; born September 9, 1995) is a Japanese football player who plays as a midfielder for J1 League club Gamba Osaka.

== Career ==
After attending Hannan University, Fujiwara joined Giravanz Kitakyushu in January 2018. He made his debut for Giravanz against Blaublitz Akita on 3 May 2018. Fujiwara scored his first goal for the club against Omiya Ardija on 4 November 2020, scoring in the 65th minute.

On 29 December 2020, Fujiwara was announced at Albirex Niigata. He made his debut for Albirex against Giravanz Kityakyushu on 27 February 2021. On 25 December 2021, Fujiwara extended his contract for the 2022 season. He scored his first goal for the club against V-Varen Nagasaki on 23 April 2022, scoring in the 73rd minute. On 25 December 2022, it was announced that the club had extended his contract for the 2023 season. On 28 December 2023, his contract was extended for the 2024 season.

== Personal life ==
Fujiwara announced his marriage on March 15, 2024 to a woman who wished to remain anonymous.

== Club statistics ==
As of 29 October 2026.

Appearances and goals by club, season and competition
Club	Season	League			National cup (Note: Includes Emperor's Cup)		League cup (Note: Includes J.League Cup)		Total	
Club	Season	Division	Apps	Goals	Apps	Goals	Apps	Goals	Apps	Goals
Giravanz Kitakyushu	2018	J3 League	16	0	0	0	–		16	0
Giravanz Kitakyushu	2019	J3 League	27	0	2	0	–		29	0
Giravanz Kitakyushu	2020	J2 League	29	3	0	0	–		29	3
Giravanz Kitakyushu	Total		72	3	2	0	0	0	74	3
Albirex Niigata	2021	J2 League	40	0	1	0	0	0	41	0
Albirex Niigata	2022	J2 League	41	4	0	0	0	0	41	4
Albirex Niigata	2023	J1 League	24	0	1	0	3	0	28	0
Albirex Niigata	2024	J1 League	37	5	1	0	8	0	46	5
Albirex Niigata	2025	J1 League	34	0	0	0	1	0	35	0
Albirex Niigata	2026	J2/J3 (100)	20	2	–		–		20	2
Albirex Niigata	2026–27	J2 League	5	0	1	0	1	0	7	0
Albirex Niigata	Total		201	11	4	0	13	0	218	11
Gamba Osaka	2026–27	J1 League	3	0	0	0	0	0	2	0
Career total			276	14	6	0	13	0	294	14

== Honours ==
Giravanz Kitakyushu

- J3 League: 2019

Albirex Niigata

- J2 League: 2022
