= 2024 All Japan University Football Championship =

Tournament details
- Country: Japan
- Dates: 7–28 December 2024
- Teams: 28

Final positions
- Champions: Toyo (1st title)
- Runners-up: Niigata HW

The 2024 All Japan University Football Championship (第73回 全日本大学サッカー選手権大会; All Japan 73rd University Football Championship) was the 73rd edition of the referred annually contested cup for universities across Japan, also known as Intercollegiate. For the first time, the tournament format was significantly changed. On 4 December 2023, it was announced beforehand that not only the number of teams would increase from 24 to 28 teams, but the tournament would also change from the previous single elimination tournament to a three-round, five-stage format.

Toyo eventually won the tournament, beating Niigata University of Health and Welfare in the final by 1–0. It was Toyo's first time in their history not only to win the tournament, but to reach the final as well. Niigata HW ended up being runners-up for the second time in the tournament's history, having lost both of the two finals they played.

== Format ==
A total of 28 teams participates in the tournament. Six teams advanced directly to the final round, two advanced directly to the strengthening round (recommended by JUFA Board of Directors), and the other 20 teams were assigned to the qualifying round. The 10 winning teams advanced to the final round, while the other 10 losing teams advanced to the strengthening round.

In the strengthening round, then, participates 12 teams, which includes the 10 qualifying round losing teams and the two teams recommended by the JUFA. The 12 teams are split in three groups of four teams in each. All three group winners, along with the best second-placed team among the groups (who has their knockout stage qualification described as a "wildcard"), qualifies for the knockout stage of the round (starts at the semi-finals). The winning team of the strengthening round will be given a direct regional slot as "strengthening round winner" in the following year's tournament.

In the final round, 16 teams participates, being them the 10 winning teams of the preliminary round and six automatically allocated teams. They are divided into four groups with four teams in each. Each group winners qualifies for the knockout stage of the round (start at the quarter-finals). The winning team of the final round will be declared as the official tournament champion.

== Participating clubs ==
The participating universities were announced on 19 November 2024. However, as the university did not submitted the application documents within the predetermined deadline, Fukuoka University had their rights to participate in the tournament removed. They would qualify as Kyushu's best-ranked representative, as champions of the Kyushu University League.

The National Institute of Fitness and Sports in Kanoya participates in the tournament for the most consecutive times out of every other qualified university, having qualified for 15 straight times. Tokai University qualified for the first time in 23 years, being between the qualified the team with the current longest interval between its last participation. Niigata Sangyo University is the only debutant of the tournament.

This year's tournament did not use a draw to determine the pairings, but rather used "ranking points", assigned to each regional university football federation, previously used to determine seed slots for the Prime Minister's Cup and the Intercollegiate.

- Teams highlighted in **bold** were automatically assigned for the final round
- Teams highlighted in italics were automatically assigned for the strengthening round, as recommended by the JUFA Board of Directors

Region	RP	University	Apps	Located on	RRP
PM Cup winner	1st	**Hannan University**	22nd	Osaka	96.000
PM Cup runner-up	1st	Niigata University of Health and Welfare	10th	Niigata	50.000
PM 3rd place	5th	Tokyo International University	4th	Saitama	38.200
Hokkaido	1st	Sapporo University	45th	Sapporo	2.000
Tohoku	1st	Hachinohe Gakuin University	3rd	Aomori	10.000
Tohoku	2nd	Fuji University	3rd	Iwate	5.000
Kanto	1st	**Meiji University**	23rd	Tokyo	191.000
Kanto	2nd	**University of Tsukuba**	42nd	Ibaraki	95.500
Kanto	3rd	Toyo University	3rd	Tokyo	63.667
Kanto	4th	Chuo University	36th	Tokyo	47.750
Kanto	6th	Nihon University	5th	Tokyo	31.833
Kanto	7th	Toin University of Yokohama	3rd	Kanagawa	27.286
Kanto	8th	Tokai University	9th	Kanagawa	23.875
Hokushin'etsu	2nd	Niigata University of Management	5th	Niigata	25.000
Hokushin'etsu	3rd	Niigata Sangyo University	3rd	Niigata	16.667
Tokai	1st	**Tokoha University**	15th	Shizuoka	23.000
Tokai	2nd	Chukyo University	44th	Aichi	11.500
Tokai	3rd	Tokai Gakuen University	8th	Aichi	7.667
Kansai	2nd	**Kansai University**	27th	Osaka	48.000
Kansai	3rd	Kyoto Sangyo University	9th	Kyoto	32.000
Kansai	4th	Osaka University of Health and Sport Sciences	23rd	Osaka	24.000
Kansai	5th	Osaka Gakuin University	4th	Osaka	19.200
Kansai	6th	Kwansei Gakuin University	26th	Hyogo	16.000
Chugoku	1st	Hiroshima University	15th	Hiroshima	6.000
Shikoku	1st	Shikoku Gakuin University	4th	Kagawa	2.000
Kyushu	1st	**Kyushu Sangyo University**	20th	Fukuoka	16.000
Kyushu	2nd	National Institute of Fitness and Sports in Kanoya	26th	Kagoshima	8.000
Kyushu	3rd	Nippon Bunri University	5th	Oita	5.333

== Schedule ==
=== Qualifying round ===
The higher-ranked teams by regional ranking points hosted each fixture, playing then, against lower-ranked teams. The sequence used to determine the match-ups started with the top-ranked home team facing the bottom-ranked away team, the second top-ranked home team facing the ninth-ranked away team, down to the lower-ranked home team facing the top-ranked away team.

To determine which group each team would qualify to, the total ranking points of the involved teams was utilized, with the groups having been set beforehand, although the identity of each team was only known after the round completion.

The winning teams of each match qualified to the Final Round, while the losing team advanced to the Strengthening Round.

7 December 1	Hachinohe Gakuin	0–2	Osaka HSS	Futaba
13:00		Report	Takuji Hiragawara 32'; Own goal 79' (o.g.)	Stadium: J-Village Stadium; Attendance: 190

7 December 2	Niigata HW	5–0	Nippon Bunri	Kanazawa
11:00	Temmu Matsumoto 21', 73', 90'; Yuzumu Tazawa 66'; Kira Uenohira 85'	Report		Stadium: Seibu Ryokuchi Park Athletics Stadium; Attendance: 132; Referee: Ryuto Takemoto

7 December 3	Toyo	5–2	Sapporo	Kita
11:00	Mahiro Yunomae 10'; Seito Ponce Omori 26', 54'; Yusei Yamanouchi 39'; Kota Nakayama 46'	Report	Koki Nomura 32'; Toshiki Kawai 79'	Stadium: Ajinomoto Field Nishigaoka; Attendance: 393; Referee: Haruto Watanabe

7 December 4	Chuo	0–1	Tokai Gakuen	Kita
14:00		Report	Motoki Imamura 45+2'	Stadium: Ajinomoto Field Nishigaoka; Attendance: 436; Referee: Shumpei Katsuyama

7 December 5	Tokyo International	1–1 (a.e.t.) (1–4 p)	Kwansei Gakuin	Chofu
11:00	Michi Hashibe 105+2'	Report	Haruki Konishi 118'	Stadium: AGF Field; Attendance: 346
	Penalties
	Towa Chikuma (penalty missed); Shusuke Furuya (penalty scored); Keisuke Yoshida (penalty missed)		(penalty scored) Haruki Yoshida; (penalty scored) Riku Nonaka; (penalty scored) Naru Tokuhiro; (penalty scored) Shunnosuke Suzuki

7 December 6	Chukyo	2–2 (a.e.t.) (3–1 p)	Tokai	Kariya
14:00	Kosei Nakashima 83'; Kanta Maeda 120+5'	Report	Own goal 51' (o.g.); Kakeru Azuma 99'	Stadium: Wave Stadium Kariya; Attendance: 812
	Penalties
	Yoshito Kobayashi (penalty missed); Kanata Yakabi (penalty scored); Taiki Oshitomi (penalty scored); Hiroshi Muto (penalty scored)		(penalty scored) Kakeru Azuma; (penalty missed) Takeru Nakakuma; (penalty missed) Jeffrey Ito; (penalty missed) Hitoshi Nagaki

7 December 7	Kyoto Sangyo	2–2 (a.e.t.) (4–5 p)	Osaka Gakuin	Sakai
13:00	Taketo Kanno 26'; Kota Shiromizu 112'	Report	Hayato Kanda 6'; Yoshiki Okada 120+1'	Stadium: J-Green Sakai Main Field; Attendance: 494
	Penalties
	Kota Yokokubo (penalty scored); Tsubasa Ito (penalty scored); Shohei Ogushi (penalty missed); Kota Shiromizu (penalty scored); Junon Nakada (penalty scored)		(penalty scored) Mikuto Yamamoto; (penalty scored) Takumi Sameshima; (penalty scored) Yutaro Suese; (penalty scored) Yoshiki Okada; (penalty scored) Tatsuya Hakozaki

7 December 8	Hiroshima	1–5	Toin Yokohama	Fukuyama
13:00	Hiroto Sakai 48'	Report	Keisuke Kasai 26', 38'; Takanari Endo 29'; Keigo Watanabe 65'; Yuzuki Ikeda 83'	Stadium: Fukuyama Tsuun Rose Stadium; Attendance: 276; Referee: Kazuki Fujiwara

7 December 9	Shikoku Gakuin	2–4	Nihon	Marugame
13:00	Jion Murotsu 50'; Temma Muro 81'	Report	Kotatsu Kumakura 15', 63'; Yamato Aoki 54'; Hayato Hirao 74'	Stadium: Pikara Stadium; Attendance: 140

7 December 10	Kanoya	2–1	Niigata-keiei	Kumamoto
11:00	Shoma Ishizaki 61'; Hayato Takayama 71'	Report	Kairi Takemoto 9'	Stadium: Ohzu Sports Park Field; Attendance: 160

=== Strengthening round ===
==== Group 1 ====
Pos	Team	Pld	W	D	L	GF	GA	GD	Pts	Qualification or relegation
1	Chuo	3	3	0	0	15	3	+12	9	Advanced to the knockout stage
2	Hachinohe Gakuin	3	1	1	1	7	8	−1	4	
3	Niigata Sangyo	3	1	1	1	7	10	−3	4	
4	Shikoku Gakuin	3	0	0	3	5	13	−8	0	

Source: JFA.jp
Rules for classification: 1) Points; 2) Goal difference; 3) Number of goals scored; 4) Head-to-head performance; 5) Fair-play points

13 December	Chuo	3–1	Hachinohe Gakuin	Ibaraki
11:00	Kanta Tanaka 31'; Yuto Toyama 71'; Taiyo Kogawa 90+2'	Report	Ren Ishizaki 35'	Stadium: Hitachinaka Multi-purpose Field A Attendance: 26; Referee: Shoei Hirano

13 December	Niigata Sangyo	5–0	Shikoku Gakuin	Ibaraki
14:00	Nao Hashioka 1'; Kazuki Fujimoto 14'; Kan Ishiwata 15'; Makiya Higashi 17'; Itsuki Nitta 77'	Report		Stadium: Hitachinaka Multi-purpose Field A Attendance: 41; Referee: Taro Honda

15 December	Chuo	4–2	Shikoku Gakuin	Ibaraki
11:00	Yuto Toyama 10', 39'; Taiyo Kogawa 57'; Kota Tanabe 70'	Report	Keijiro Kumano 32'; Umi Kawamoto 75'	Stadium: Hitachinaka General Athletics Park Sports Field 2 Attendance: 37; Referee: Riku Kato

15 December	Niigata Sangyo	2–2	Hachinohe Gakuin	Ibaraki
14:00	Kazuki Fujimoto 36'; ? Nitta 67'	Report	Taiki Kimura 70'; Teruki Toba 90+2'	Stadium: Hitachinaka General Athletics Park Sports Field 2 Attendance: 40; Referee: Kosuke Kurusawa

17 December	Hachinohe Gakuin	4–3	Shikoku Gakuin	Mito
11:00	Riku Kurisawa 34', 62', 64'; Yang Hyun-jun 83'	Report	Tenma Muro 2'; Takuto Nakanishi 22'; Umi Kawamoto 87'	Stadium: IFA Football Center A Pitch; Attendance: 14; Referee: Kentaro Ushida

17 December	Niigata Sangyo	0–8	Chuo	Mito
14:00		Report	Yota Sugiyama 40'; Yuto Toyama 44'; Kanta Tanaka 45+1', 60'; Kyohei Okanoichi 61'; Shumpei Nishioka 73'; Ryusei Kitahama 77'; Jo Ogawa 82'	Stadium: IFA Football Center A Pitch; Attendance: 16

==== Group 2 ====
Pos	Team	Pld	W	D	L	GF	GA	GD	Pts	Qualification or relegation
1	Tokai	3	2	0	1	5	3	+2	6	Advanced to the knockout stage
2	Hiroshima	3	1	2	0	6	5	+1	5	Advanced to the knockout stage
3	Nippon Bunri	3	1	1	1	6	6	0	4	
4	Fuji	3	0	1	2	4	7	−3	1	

Source: JFA.jp
Rules for classification: 1) Points; 2) Goal difference; 3) Number of goals scored; 4) Head-to-head performance; 5) Fair-play points

13 December	Nippon Bunri	1–2	Tokai	Mito
11:00	Shunsei Wada 14'	Report	Taiyo Oto 52'; Yohei Otsuka 70'	Stadium: IFA Football Center A Pitch; Attendance: 44; Referee: Kenta Hidaka

13 December	Fuji	2–2	Hiroshima	Mito
14:00	Kai Kimura 68'; Mutsuki Okuno 90+2'	Report	Taiga Irie 6'; Daito Sakai 35'	Stadium: IFA Football Center A Pitch; Attendance: 37; Referee: Yutaro Hyodo

15 December	Nippon Bunri	2–2	Hiroshima	Ibaraki
11:00	Taiga Yoshida 50'; Shunsei Wada 90+1'	Report	Ikumo Kura 9', 51'	Stadium: Hitachinaka General Athletics Park Sports Field 1 Attendance: 45; Referee: Rikuto Imai

15 December	Fuji	0–2	Tokai	Ibaraki
14:00		Report	Tsubasa Watanabe 50'; Keita Matsuhashi 53'	Stadium: Hitachinaka General Athletics Park Sports Field 1 Attendance: 73; Referee: Hayuma Tanaka

17 December	Tokai	1–2	Hiroshima	Ibaraki
11:00	Haruka Suzuki 8'	Report	Hiroto Sakai 43', 45+1'	Stadium: Hitachinaka General Athletics Park Sports Field 2 Attendance: 39; Referee: Tsubasa Ota

17 December	Fuji	2–3	Nippon Bunri	Ibaraki
14:00	Haruto Harada 45+1', 78'	Report	Rin Takahata 7', 42'; Ruito Kawahara 59'	Stadium: Hitachinaka General Athletics Park Sports Field 2 Attendance: 52; Referee: Sota Takano

==== Group 3 ====
Pos	Team	Pld	W	D	L	GF	GA	GD	Pts	Qualification or relegation
1	Kyoto Sangyo	3	2	1	0	6	4	+2	7	Advanced to the knockout stage
2	Tokyo International	3	2	0	1	8	6	+2	6	
3	Niigata-keiei	3	1	1	1	8	5	+3	4	
4	Sapporo	3	0	0	3	3	10	−7	0	

Source: JFA.jp
Rules for classification: 1) Points; 2) Goal difference; 3) Number of goals scored; 4) Head-to-head performance; 5) Fair-play points

13 December	Tokyo International	1–2	Kyoto Sangyo	Mito
11:00	Shusuke Furuya 61'	Report	Taketo Kanno 53', 64'	Stadium: IFA Football Center B Pitch; Attendance: 47; Referee: Ikumi Nagai

13 December	Sapporo	0–4	Niigata-keiei	Mito
14:00		Report	Aito Nakano 7', 76'; Kairi Takemoto 19', 33'	Stadium: IFA Football Center B Pitch; Attendance: 24; Referee: Haruya Tanaka

15 December	Tokyo International	2–1	Niigata-keiei	Ibaraki
11:00	Toya Sato 45+2'; Kotaro Saegusa 59'	Report	Aito Nakano 90+1'	Stadium: Hitachinaka Multi-purpose Field A Attendance: 60; Referee: Kashin Isogaya

15 December	Sapporo	0–1	Kyoto Sangyo	Ibaraki
14:00		Report	Hayato Senoo 43'	Stadium: Hitachinaka Multi-purpose Field A Attendance: 43; Referee: Seiji Kato

17 December	Kyoto Sangyo	3–3	Niigata-keiei	Ibaraki
11:00	Sakuto Yamamura 1'; Kota Yokokubo 31'; Toshimune Tanaka 90+5'	Report	Kei Shirai 75', 88'; Aito Nakano 85'	Stadium: Hitachinaka General Athletics Park Sports Field 1 Attendance: 40

17 December	Sapporo	3–5	Tokyo International	Ibaraki
14:00	Toshiki Kawai 14', 87'; Ren Sakurai 20'	Report	Yusuke Kamiya 33'; Shusuke Furuya 62'; Own goal 78' (o.g.); Gakuto Ozaki 81'; Keisuke Yoshida 90+1'	Stadium: Hitachinaka General Athletics Park Sports Field 1 Attendance: 33

==== Semi-finals ====
19 December 53	Chuo	4–1	Hiroshima	Mito
12:00	Ryusei Kitahama 51', 65'; Yota Sugiyama 76'; Haruki Sato 90+3'	Report	Yuki Owatari 74'	Stadium: IFA Football Center A Pitch; Attendance: 31; Referee: Narimasa Sasaki

19 December 54	Kyoto Sangyo	1–0	Tokai	Mito
12:00	Taketo Kanno 32'	Report		Stadium: IFA Football Center B Pitch; Attendance: 35; Referee: Tomoya Suzuki

==== Final ====
21 December
12:00
55

Chuo	1–3	Kyoto Sangyo
Taiyo Kogawa 73'	Report	Junon Nakada 20'; Taketo Kanno 71'; Takuma Iwamura 89'

Hitachinaka City Stadium, Hitachinaka
Attendance: 69
Referee: Shumpei Katsuyama

=== Final round ===
==== Group A ====
Pos	Team	Pld	W	D	L	GF	GA	GD	Pts	Qualification or relegation
1	Osaka Gakuin	3	2	0	1	5	3	+2	6	Advances to the knockout stage
2	Meiji	3	1	2	0	2	0	+2	5	Advances to the knockout stage
3	Kwansei Gakuin	3	1	1	1	2	2	0	4	
4	Kanoya	3	0	1	2	0	4	−4	1	

Source: JFA.jp
Rules for classification: 1) Points; 2) Goal difference; 3) Number of goals scored; 4) Head-to-head performance; 5) Fair-play points

14 December	Kwansei Gakuin	1–2	Osaka Gakuin	Hitachinaka
11:00	Kazunosuke Furuta 32'	Report	Hayato Kanda 24', 74'	Stadium: Hitachinaka City Stadium; Attendance: 80; Referee: Narimasa Sasaki

14 December	Meiji	0–0	Kanoya	Hitachinaka
14:00		Report		Stadium: Hitachinaka City Stadium; Attendance: 240

16 December	Kwansei Gakuin	1–0	Kanoya	Hitachinaka
11:00	Ryusei Sakita 45+3'	Report		Stadium: Hitachinaka City Stadium; Attendance: 97; Referee: Ikumi Nagai

16 December	Meiji	2–0	Osaka Gakuin	Hitachinaka
14:00	Rei Shimano 24'; Issei Kumatoriya 33'	Report		Stadium: Hitachinaka City Stadium; Attendance: 135; Referee: Misaki Chiba

18 December	Osaka Gakuin	3–0	Kanoya	Hitachinaka
11:00	Rei Aoki 8'; Hayato Kanda 19'; Daichi Mitsunari 72'	Report		Stadium: Hitachinaka City Stadium; Attendance: 61

18 December	Meiji	0–0	Kwansei Gakuin	Hitachinaka
14:00		Report		Stadium: Hitachinaka City Stadium; Attendance: 112

==== Group B ====
Pos	Team	Pld	W	D	L	GF	GA	GD	Pts	Qualification or relegation
1	Niigata HW	3	3	0	0	9	3	+6	9	Advances to the knockout stage
2	Toin Yokohama	3	2	0	1	4	3	+1	6	Advances to the knockout stage
3	Hannan	3	1	0	2	6	10	−4	3	
4	Chukyo	3	0	0	3	4	7	−3	0	

Source: JFA.jp
Rules for classification: 1) Points; 2) Goal difference; 3) Number of goals scored; 4) Head-to-head performance; 5) Fair-play points

14 December	Niigata HW	2–1	Chukyo	Shijōnawate
11:00	Ryusei Akimoto 27'; Kosei Yoshida 53'	Report	Yota Inoue 13'	Stadium: Shijonawate Park Artificial Turf Field; Attendance: 141; Referee: Ryunosuke Koyama

14 December	Hannan	1–2	Toin Yokohama	Shijōnawate
14:00	Yu Nakada 66'	Report	Keigo Watanabe 27'; Keisuke Kasai 54'	Stadium: Shijonawate Park Artificial Turf Field; Attendance: 100

16 December	Niigata HW	1–0	Toin Yokohama	Sakai
11:00	Kosei Yoshida 70'	Report		Stadium: J-Green Sakai Main Field; Attendance: 108

16 December	Hannan	3–2	Chukyo	Sakai
14:00	Wigi Kanemoto 28'; Fugo Matsumoto 29', 35'	Report	Kosei Nakashima 6'; Shuto Udo 15'	Stadium: J-Green Sakai Main Field; Attendance: 217

18 December	Chukyo	1–2	Toin Yokohama	Sakai
11:00	Shuto Udo 71'	Report	Renji Hidano 81'; Ruon Hisanaga 86'	Stadium: J-Green Sakai Main Field; Attendance: 129; Referee: Ko Furuta

18 December	Hannan	2–6	Niigata HW	Sakai
14:00	Wigi Kanemoto 31'; Shunta Morimura 85'	Report	Kosei Yoshida 25', 62'; Yuzumu Tazawa 45+3'; Kyo Hosoi 72'; Kira Uenohira 76'; Kenta Urushidate 90+2'	Stadium: J-Green Sakai Main Field

==== Group C ====
Pos	Team	Pld	W	D	L	GF	GA	GD	Pts	Qualification or relegation
1	Tsukuba	3	2	1	0	8	1	+7	7	Advances to the knockout stage
2	Osaka HSS	3	1	1	1	2	1	+1	4	Advances to the knockout stage
3	Kyushu Sangyo	3	1	0	2	4	8	−4	3	
4	Tokai Gakuen	3	1	0	2	3	7	−4	3	

Source: JFA.jp
Rules for classification: 1) Points; 2) Goal difference; 3) Number of goals scored; 4) Head-to-head performance; 5) Fair-play points

14 December	Tsukuba	3–0	Tokai Gakuen	Kitakyushu
11:00	Ginjiro Ikegaya 50'; Masato Handai 59'; Koshiro Sumi 77'	Report		Stadium: Kurusaki Harima Athletics Stadium in Honjo; Attendance: 160; Referee: Sota Yoshida

14 December	Kyushu Sangyo	1–0	Osaka HSS	Kitakyushu
14:00	Akira Iihoshi 39'	Report		Stadium: Kurusaki Harima Athletics Stadium in Honjo; Attendance: 150; Referee: Haruki Yamane

16 December	Tsukuba	0–0	Osaka HSS	Kitakyushu
11:00		Report		Stadium: Kurusaki Harima Athletics Stadium in Honjo; Attendance: 130

16 December	Kyushu Sangyo	2–3	Tokai Gakuen	Kitakyushu
14:00	Yuta Kikuchi 33', 83'	Report	Kisei Hasebe 14'; Ora Takahashi 85'; Kazuki Otsuka 88'	Stadium: Kurusaki Harima Athletics Stadium in Honjo; Attendance: 70

18 December	Tokai Gakuen	0–2	Osaka HSS	Kitakyushu
11:00		Report	Kengo Furuyama 18'; Ryoma Sano 74'	Stadium: Mikuni World Stadium Kitakyushu; Attendance: 110; Referee: Shoma Sato

18 December	Kyushu Sangyo	1–5	Tsukuba	Kitakyushu
14:00	Kaiga Iwasaki 37'	Report	Toshiki Ando 18'; Ginjiro Ikegaya 28'; Koshiro Sumi 31', 56'; Own goal 55' (o.g.)	Stadium: Mikuni World Stadium Kitakyushu; Attendance: 270; Referee: Haruki Yamane

==== Group D ====
Pos	Team	Pld	W	D	L	GF	GA	GD	Pts	Qualification or relegation
1	Toyo	3	2	0	1	4	1	+3	6	Advances to the knockout stage
2	Nihon	3	2	0	1	3	1	+2	6	Advances to the knockout stage
3	Kansai	3	1	0	2	1	3	−2	3	
4	Tokoha	3	1	0	2	1	4	−3	3	

Source: JFA.jp
Rules for classification: 1) Points; 2) Goal difference; 3) Number of goals scored; 4) Head-to-head performance; 5) Fair-play points

14 December	Kansai	0–1	Toyo	Gifu
11:00		Report	Rintaro Masuda 90+6'	Stadium: Gifu Nagaragawa Stadium; Attendance: 193

14 December	Tokoha	1–0	Nihon	Gifu
14:00	Shintaro Hata 44'	Report		Stadium: Gifu Nagaragawa Stadium; Attendance: 136; Referee: Ko Furuta

16 December	Kansai	0–2	Nihon	Gifu
11:00		Report	Kotatsu Kumakura 29'; Hayato Hirao 54'	Stadium: Gifu Nagaragawa Meadow; Attendance: 117

16 December	Tokoha	0–3	Toyo	Gifu
14:00		Report	Takehiro Minami 17'; Rintaro Masuda 66'; Yusaku Tasei 76'	Stadium: Gifu Nagaragawa Meadow; Attendance: 98; Referee: Ryuto Takemoto

18 December	Toyo	0–1	Nihon	Gifu
11:00		Report	Hinata Seki 90+3'	Stadium: Gifu Nagaragawa Meadow; Attendance: 114

18 December	Tokoha	0–1	Kansai	Gifu
14:00		Report	Kosuke Kawashima 49'	Stadium: Gifu Nagaragawa Meadow; Attendance: 111; Referee: Rui Takemoto

==== Quarter-finals ====
22 December 55	Osaka Gakuin	1–5	Toin Yokohama	Tochigi
10:30	Kotetsu Nakai 13'	Report	Keisuke Kasai 25', 39', 50', 54'; Torataro Okazaki 89'	Stadium: Tochigi General Park Athletics Stadium; Attendance: 178

22 December 56	Toyo	3–1	Osaka HSS	Sakura
10:30	Mahiro Yunomae 18'; Hikaru Takahashi 38'; Yuta Arai 54'	Report	Shu Ikedo 56'	Stadium: Sakura Stadium; Attendance: 250; Referee: Takuma Ogaki

22 December 58	Niigata HW	2–1	Nihon	Sakura
13:00	Hayato Mori 84'; Tenmu Matsumoto 88'	Report	Kotatsu Kumakura 76'	Stadium: Sakura Stadium; Attendance: 415

22 December 59	Tsukuba	0–0 (a.e.t.) (4–5 p)	Meiji	Tochigi
13:30		Report		Stadium: Tochigi General Park Athletics Stadium; Attendance: 672; Referee: Shota Kimura
	Penalties
	Kotaro Uchino (penalty missed); Gen Kato (penalty scored); Sora Okita (penalty scored); Takato Takeuchi (penalty scored); Keita Fukui (penalty scored)		(penalty scored) Naoya Mishina; (penalty scored) Hayato Manabe; (penalty scored) Atsushi Inagaki; (penalty scored) Sota Nakamura; (penalty scored) Rei Shimano

==== Semi-finals ====
25 December 60	Toin Yokohama	0–1	Toyo	Utsunomiya
11:00	Rintaro Masuda 78'	Report		Stadium: Tochigi Green Stadium

25 December 61	Meiji	0–0 (3–4 p)	Niigata HW	Utsunomiya
14:00		Report		Stadium: Tochigi Green Stadium; Attendance: 480; Referee: Kazuyoshi Karashima
	Penalties
	Hayato Manabe (penalty scored); Naoya Mishina (penalty scored); Seiryo Usui (penalty missed); Rei Shimano (penalty missed); Atsushi Inagaki (penalty scored)		(penalty scored) Temmu Matsumoto; (penalty scored) Kakeru Otsuka; (penalty missed) Shunki Mukai; (penalty scored) Yusuke Aoki; (penalty scored) Kyo Hosoi

==== Final ====
28 December
12:00
62

Toyo	1–0	Niigata HW
Yuta Arai 39'	Report

Tochigi Green Stadium, Utsunomiya
Attendance: 4,424
Referee: Yusuke Ohashi

GK	1	(Japan) Hiroto Maeda
DF	3	(Japan) Toi Ohashi
DF	4	(Japan) Hayato Inamura
DF	5	(Japan) Yusei Yamanouchi
DF	18	(Japan) Ryo Arai
MF	6	(Japan) Kakeru Watai
MF	8	(Japan) Kota Nakayama (c)
MF	10	(Japan) Yuta Arai	(substituted off) 90+3'
MF	17	(Japan) Mahiro Yunomae	(substituted off) 63'
FW	14	(Japan) Hikaru Takahashi
FW	20	(Japan) Riki Murakami	(substituted off) 70'
Substitutes:
MF	7	(Japan) Rintaro Masuda	(substituted in) 63'
FW	13	(Japan) Rintaro Umetsu	(substituted in) 70'
DF	23	(Japan) Hinata Fukuhara	(substituted in) 90+3'
Manager:
(Japan) Takuya Inoue

GK	1	(Japan) Ryo Momoi
DF	3	(Japan) Mamoru Naruse
DF	4	(Japan) Ryusei Akimoto (c)
DF	5	(Japan) Kyo Hosoi
DF	23	(Japan) Ren Shiraishi
DF	24	(Japan) Kakeru Otsuka
MF	7	(Japan) Yuzumu Tazawa	(substituted off) 65'
MF	10	(Japan) Temmu Matsumoto
MF	13	(Japan) Kira Uenohira	(substituted off) 86'
FW	8	(Japan) Ryu Takaashi	(substituted off) 65'
FW	11	(Japan) Kosei Yoshida	(substituted off) 76'
Substitutes:
MF	26	(Japan) Hayato Mori	(substituted in) 65'
FW	9	(Japan) Yusuke Aoki	(substituted in) 65'
FW	15	(Japan) Kenta Urushidate	(substituted in) 76'
MF	25	(Japan) Raiki Wakabayashi	(substituted in) 86'
Manager:
(Japan) Hirokazu Sakuma

Assistant referees:
Kanta Imai
Kan Mishina
Fourth official:
Ikumi Nagai

Match rules

- 90 minutes.
- Extra-time of 15 minutes for each half if scores still level.
- Persisting a draw after extra-time, a penalty shoot-out would be held.
- Nine named substitutes.
- Maximum of five substitutions.

== Top scorers ==
Only taking in consideration the Final Round.

Rank	Player	University	Goals
1	(Japan) Keisuke Kasai	Toin Yokohama	5
2	(Japan) Hayato Kanda	Osaka Gakuin	3
2	(Japan) Rintaro Masuda	Toyo	3
2	(Japan) Koshiro Sumi	Tsukuba	3
2	(Japan) Kosei Yoshida	Niigata HW	3

== Joining J.League clubs in 2025 ==
As of 12 February 2025.

Pos.	Player	Moving from	Moving to	League
GK	Go Kambayashi	Meiji	Cerezo Osaka	J1
GK	Ryoya Kimura	Nihon	Yokohama F. Marinos	J1
GK	Hiroto Maeda	Toyo	Azul Claro Numazu	J3
GK	Ryota Matsumoto	Tokyo International	Iwaki FC	J2
GK	Tsubasa Nishizawa	Toin Yokohama	Júbilo Iwata	J2
GK	Sera Yamaguchi	Chukyo	FC Gifu	J3
DF	Ryusei Akimoto	Niigata HW	Thespa Gunma	J3
DF	Toshiki Ando	Tsukuba	Sagan Tosu	J2
DF	Koki Azumane	Tokyo International	Gainare Tottori	J3
DF	Sota Fukazawa	Chukyo	Kataller Toyama	J2
DF	Keita Fukui	Tsukuba	Omiya Ardija	J2
DF	Sena Igarashi	Toin Yokohama	Iwaki FC	J2
DF	Hayato Inamura	Toyo	Albirex Niigata	J1
DF	Kenta Itakura	Tokyo International	Mito HollyHock	J2
DF	Hiroshi Iwasaki	Toin Yokohama	Tochigi SC	J3
DF	Kosuke Kawashima	Kansai	Kagoshima United	J3
DF	Yuto Kimura	Kansai	Tochigi SC	J3
DF	Koki Kumakura	Nihon	Yokohama FC	J1
DF	Taisei Kuwata	Chukyo	Kashiwa Reysol	J1
DF	Taichi Matsumoto	Toin Yokohama	Gainare Tottori	J3
DF	Yuya Mineda	Osaka HSS	Renofa Yamaguchi	J2
DF	Kodai Nagata	Meiji	Kyoto Sanga	J1
DF	Ryo Nakamura	Sapporo	Fujieda MYFC	J2
DF	Shoya Nose	Hannan	Thespa Gunma	J3
DF	Shohei Ogushi	Kyoto Sangyo	FC Gifu	J3
DF	Sora Okita	Tsukuba	Mito HollyHock	J2
DF	Seiga Sumi	Meiji	Fagiano Okayama	J2
DF	Kyota Tokiwa	Meiji	FC Tokyo	J1
DF	Yosuke Uchida	Meiji	Tokyo Verdy	J1
DF	Kota Yokokubo	Kyoto Sangyo	Tegevajaro Miyazaki	J3
MF	Yuta Arai	Toyo	Tokyo Verdy	J1
MF	Takanari Endo	Toin Yokohama	Yokohama FC	J1
MF	Tatsuya Hakozaki	Osaka Gakuin	FC Gifu	J3
MF	Yoko Iesaka	Chuo	Fagiano Okayama	J1
MF	Akira Iihoshi	Kyushu Sangyo	Roasso Kumamoto	J2
MF	Yuta Inami	Sapporo	Vanraure Hachinohe	J3
MF	Keisuke Kasai	Toin Yokohama	Albirex Niigata	J1
MF	Gen Kato	Tsukuba	Nagoya Grampus	J1
MF	Toshiki Kawai	Sapporo	Tegevajaro Miyazaki	J3
MF	Shuma Kido	Osaka HSS	Hokkaido Consadole Sapporo	J2
MF	Kotatsu Kumakura	Nihon	Ventforet Kofu	J2
MF	Issei Kumatoriya	Meiji	Tokyo Verdy	J1
MF	Tenmu Matsumoto	Niigata HW	V-Varen Nagasaki	J2
MF	Rinta Miyoshi	Hannan	Kochi United	J3
MF	Kota Nakayama	Toyo	Omiya Ardija	J2
MF	Shunta Morimura	Hannan	Mito HollyHock	J2
MF	Ryota Saito	Hannan	V-Varen Nagasaki	J2
MF	Yusei Shinomiya	Osaka Gakuin	Zweigen Kanazawa	J3
MF	Koshiro Sumi	Tsukuba	Júbilo Iwata	J2
MF	Kakeru Watai	Toyo	Azul Claro Numazu	J3
MF	Rearu Watanabe	Kanoya	Roasso Kumamoto	J2
MF	Keisuke Yoshida	Tokyo International	Nagano Parceiro	J2
MF	Azuri Yutani	Chuo	Vegalta Sendai	J2
FW	Nabel Yoshitaka Furusawa	Tokyo International	Kashiwa Reysol	J1
FW	Kengo Furuyama	Osaka HSS	Cerezo Osaka	J1
FW	Masato Handai	Tsukuba	Roasso Kumamoto	J2
FW	Soki Hoshino	Chuo	Tochigi SC	J3
FW	Hayato Kanda	Osaka Gakuin	Fujieda MYFC	J2
FW	Haru Kano	Chuo	Nagano Parceiro	J3
FW	Taisei Kato	Kanoya	Iwaki FC	J2
FW	Kanji Kuwayama	Tokai	Machida Zelvia	J1
FW	Sota Nakamura	Meiji	Sanfrecce Hiroshima	J1
FW	Soki Tamura	Tsukuba	Shonan Bellmare	J1
FW	Shuto Udo	Chukyo	Oita Trinita	J2
FW	Keigo Watanabe	Toin Yokohama	Shonan Bellmare	J1

== See also ==
- 2024 All Japan High School Soccer Tournament
