= 2024 Prime Minister's Cup All Japan University Football Tournament =

2024 Prime Minister's Cup All Japan University Football Championship
Tournament details
- Country: Japan
- Dates: 4–15 September 2024
- Teams: 32

Final positions
- Champions: Hannan (3rd title)
- Runner-up: Niigata HW

Tournament statistics
- Matches played: 31
- Goals scored: 115 (3.71 per match)
- Top goal scorer(s): Naberu Yoshitaka Furusawa; Wigi Kanemoto (4 goals)

The 2024 Prime Minister's Cup All Japan University Football Championship (『2024年度 第48回 総理大臣杯 全日本大学サッカートーナメント』 開催のお知らせ; Prime Minister's Cup All Japan 48th University Football Championship) was the 48th edition of the cup, and the first time to be contested by 32 universities.

Fuji were the defending champions, who won the last tournament for the first time in their history, beating Kwansei Gakuin in the final. Hannan eventually won the 2024 tournament against Niigata HW by 2–1, with the match being decided by an added-time goal in the second half. It was the third time Hannan won the tournament in 11 years, and in their history.

== Calendar ==
Round	Date	Matches	Clubs
First round	4 September	16	32 → 16
Round of 16	6 September	8	16 → 8
Quarter-finals	9 September	4	8 → 4
Semi-finals	12 September	2	4 → 2
Final	15 September	1	2 → 1

== Participating clubs ==
In parentheses: Each university's performance at the regional qualifying series.

Region	RP	University	Apps	Located on
Hokkaido	1st	Hokkaido University of Education Iwamizawa	10th	Iwamizawa
Hokkaido	2nd	Sapporo University	29th	Sapporo
Tohoku	1st	Sendai University	37th	Miyagi
Tohoku	2nd	Fuji University	7th	Iwate
Kanto	1st	Meiji University	18th	Tokyo
Kanto	2nd	Nihon University	5th	Tokyo
Kanto	3rd	Kokushikan University	25th	Tokyo
Kanto	4th	Keio University	9th	Tokyo
Kanto	5th	University of Tsukuba	27th	Ibaraki
Kanto	6th	Meiji Gakuin University	2nd	Tokyo
Kanto	7th	Tokyo International University	2nd	Saitama
Kanto	8th	Kanagawa University	4th	Kanagawa
Kanto	9th	Ryutsu Keizai University	13th	Ibaraki
Kanto	10th	Waseda University	22nd	Tokyo
Hokushin'etsu	1st	Niigata University of Health and Welfare	8th	Niigata
Hokushin'etsu	2nd	Matsumoto University	3rd	Nagano
Tokai	1st	Shizuoka Sangyo University	10th	Shizuoka
Tokai	2nd	Tokoha University	12nd	Shizuoka
Tokai	3rd	Chukyo University	31th	Aichi
Kansai	1st	Doshisha University	14th	Kyoto
Kansai	2nd	Kyoto Sangyo University	2nd	Kyoto
Kansai	3rd	Kansai University	21st	Osaka
Kansai	4th	Osaka Gakuin University	6th	Osaka
Kansai	5th	Osaka University of Economics	5th	Osaka
Kansai	6th	Hannan University	17th	Osaka
Chugoku	1st	International Pacific University	8th	Okayama
Chugoku	2nd	Hiroshima University	12th	Hiroshima
Shikoku	1st	Takamatsu University	3rd	Kagawa
Kyushu	1st	National Institute of Fitness and Sports in Kanoya	17th	Kagoshima
Kyushu	2nd	Kyushu Sangyo University	12th	Fukuoka
Kyushu	3rd	Nippon Bunri University	9th	Oita
Kyushu	4th	Japan University of Economics	3rd	Fukuoka

== Schedule ==
=== 1st round ===
4 September 1	Meiji Gakuin	2–2 (2–4 p)	Kyoto Sangyo	Morioka
11:00	Shunya Ii 22'; Takuya Matsumoto 50'	Report	Junon Nakada 64'; Hayato Senoo 90+1'	Stadium: Iwagin Stadium A Ground
	Penalties
	Seiya Ichikawa (penalty scored); Kio Takara (penalty missed); Satoshi Arai (penalty missed); Tomoki Watanabe (penalty scored)		(penalty scored) Kota Yokokubo; (penalty scored) Sakuto Yamamura; (penalty scored) Narumu Ono; (penalty scored) Hayato Senoo

4 September 2	Japan UE	1–3	Hannan	Morioka
11:00	Manato Kimoto 16'	Report	Wigi Kanemoto 30', 41', 43'	Stadium: Iwagin Stadium B Ground

4 September 3	Kanoya	2–2 (3–4 p)	Hiroshima	Morioka
14:00	Rearu Watanabe 19'; Koya Tokuda 25'	Report	Yuki Owatari 81'; Hiroto Sakai 85'	Stadium: Iwagin Stadium A Ground
	Penalties
	Rearu Watanabe (penalty scored); Taisei Kato (penalty missed); Rei Niikura (penalty scored); Koya Tokuda (penalty missed); Kanata Utsunomiya (penalty scored)		(penalty scored) Ikuma Kura; (penalty missed) Hiroto Sakai; (penalty scored) Hirokazu Miyahara; (penalty scored) Tatsuki Yamabe; (penalty scored) Yuta Misaki

4 September 4	Fuji	0–4	Meiji	Morioka
14:00		Report	Haruki Hayashi 5', 81'; Rei Shimano 11'; Junya Baba 86'	Stadium: Iwagin Stadium B Ground

4 September 5	Matsumoto	4–2	Hokkaido Iwamizawa	Rifu
11:00	Kanta Miyairi 10', 58'; Keito Murakami 53'; Yamato Kitano 90+5'	Report	Hitoki Matsumoto 67'; Asahi Sato 72'	Stadium: Miyagi Co-op Megumino Soccer Field C Ground

4 September 6	Shizuoka Sangyo	2–3	Kokushikan	Rifu
11:00	Tsubasa Sato 72', 75'	Report	Akihiro Nakamura 35'; Rin Homma 71'; Shunsuke Hidaka 86'	Stadium: Miyagi Co-op Megumino Soccer Field B Ground

4 September 7	Ryutsu Keizai	1–2	Chukyo	Rifu
14:00	Kenta Nemoto 90+5'	Report	Shuto Udo 43'; Kosei Masuzaki 75'	Stadium: Miyagi Co-op Megumino Soccer Field C Ground

4 September 8	Kansai	0–1	Tokyo International	Rifu
14:00		Report	Kenshiro Takahashi 90+4'	Stadium: Miyagi Co-op Megumino Soccer Field B Ground

4 September 9	Niigata HW	3–2 (a.e.t.)	Sendai	Tono
11:00	Konosuke Takehara 40'; Kyo Hosoi 78'; Kenta Urushidate 105'	Report	Kenryu Fukuda 25', 53'	Stadium: Tono Sports Park Multi-purpose Field

4 September 10	Tokoha	2–1	Osaka Gakuin	Tono
11:00	Mizuki Konishi 51'; Thiago Fujimoto 73'	Report	Rei Aoki 54'	Stadium: Tono Sports Park Athletics Field

4 September 11	Nihon	9–0	Takamatsu	Tono
14:00	Kotatsu Kumakura 22'; Kanata Inake 33'; Sota Hirano 45', 45+4', 59'; Koya Hasegawa 57', 63'; Hinata Seki 73'; Minaho Abe 90'	Report		Stadium: Tono Sports Park Multi-purpose Field

4 September 12	Sapporo	3–3 (2–4 p)	Nippon Bunri	Tono
14:00	? 4' (o.g.); Ryo Nakamura 60'; Kiyotaka Katsura 67'	Report	Taiyo Kakiuchi 40'; Masashi Ishibashi 64'; Sota Ozawa 71'	Stadium: Tono Sports Park Athletics Field
	Penalties
	Yuta Inami (penalty missed); Totsuki Kawai (penalty scored); Issei Kashiyama (penalty scored); Eito Tsuge (penalty missed)		(penalty scored) Yusuke Tanaka; (penalty scored) Sota Ozawa; (penalty scored) Mahiro Abe; (penalty scored) Taiyo Kakiuchi

4 September 13	Osaka UE	1–2 (a.e.t.)	Kanagawa	Sendai
11:00	Kazuki Ueda 20'	Report	Jiro Fujita 90+3'; Shunsuke Umigai 93'	Stadium: Izumi Football Field

4 September 14	Tsukuba	2–1	Kyushu Sangyo	Ishinomaki
11:00	Keita Fukui 11'; Shunei Kobayashi 73'	Report	Reiga Ito 15'	Stadium: Seihoku Park Ishinomaki Football Field

4 September 15	International Pacific	0–5	Waseda	Sendai
14:00		Report	Shuto Yamaichi 19'; Ren Higashi 32'; Rinsei Nishi 51', 69'; Rintaro Matsuo 77'	Stadium: Izumi Football Field

4 September 16	Keio	3–2	Doshisha	Ishinomaki
14:00	Fumiya Yanase 45+2'; Sosuke Fujii 60'; Ryosuke Murai 66'	Report	Ryo Koyama 72'; Yuto Katori 83'	Stadium: Seihoku Park Ishinomaki Football Field

=== Round of 16 ===
6 September 17	Kyoto Sangyo	3–4	Hannan	Morioka
11:00	Ko Tashiro 21'; Junon Nakada 45+2', 61'	Report	Wigi Kanemoto 4'; Rinta Miyoshi 68'; Yu Nakada 79'; Takumi Matsui 83'	Stadium: Iwagin Stadium B Ground; Attendance: 120

6 September 18	Hiroshima	2–4	Meiji	Morioka
14:00	Taiga Irie 32'; Rentaro Seguchi 36'	Report	Hayato Manabe 4'; Seiryo Usui 64'; Rei Shimano 76'; Rikuto Kuwahara 80'	Stadium: Iwagin Stadium B Ground; Attendance: 90

6 September 19	Matsumoto	1–0	Kokushikan	Rifu
11:00	Dai Kawagoe 16'	Report		Stadium: Miyagi Co-op Megumino Soccer Field B Ground; Attendance: 50

6 September 20	Chukyo	1–2	Tokyo International	Rifu
14:00	Shuto Udo 57'	Report	Keisuke Yoshida 30'; Naberu Yoshitaka Furusawa 42'	Stadium: Miyagi Co-op Megumino Soccer Field B Ground; Attendance: 50

6 September 21	Niigata HW	5–2	Tokoha	Tono
11:00	Temmu Matsumoto 45', 49'; Kosei Yoshida 53', 83'; Hayato Mori 85'	Report	Tenga Mukaigawa 2'; Haruki Mitsuhashi 70'	Stadium: Tono Sports Park Athletics Field; Attendance: 48

6 September 22	Nihon	3–1	Nippon Bunri	Tono
14:00	Hayato Hirao 12'; Minaho Abe 30'; Jay Saito 74'	Report	Hayato Ono 33'	Stadium: Tono Sports Park Athletics Field; Attendance: 51

6 September 23	Kanagawa	0–0 (a.e.t.) (5–6 p)	Tsukuba	Ishinomaki
11:00		Report		Stadium: Seihoku Park Ishinomaki Football Field; Attendance: 101
	Penalties
	Rin Tahata (penalty scored); Taiyo Yasuhara (penalty scored); Kokoro Maeda (penalty scored); Shunsuke Umigai (penalty scored); Yuma Matsumoto (penalty scored); Gyo Ruike (penalty missed)		(penalty scored) Kotaro Uchino; (penalty scored) Keita Fukui; (penalty scored) Koshiro Sumi; (penalty scored) Ginjiro Ikegaya; (penalty scored) Taiga Shimizu; (penalty scored) Shunta Ikeda

6 September 24	Waseda	2–1	Keio	Ishinomaki
14:00	Rinsei Nishi 41'; Naoya Komazawa 74'	Report	Tatsuaki Koyama 4'	Stadium: Seihoku Park Ishinomaki Football Field; Attendance: 194

=== Quarter-finals ===
9 September 25	Hannan	2–0	Meiji	Morioka
11:00	Yu Nakada 8'; Ayahi Sakurai 57'	Report		Stadium: Iwagin Stadium B Ground; Attendance: 129

9 September 26	Matsumoto	0–4	Tokyo International	Ishinomaki
11:00		Report	Naberu Yoshitaka Furusawa 39', 45+6', 54'; Shusuke Furuya 45+3'	Stadium: Seihoku Park Ishinomaki Football Field; Attendance: 109

9 September 27	Niigata HW	3–1	Nihon	Morioka
14:00	Azumu Tazawa 52'; Raiki Wakabayashi 82'; Hayato Mori 90+7'	Report	Hayate Ueki 20'	Stadium: Iwagin Stadium B Ground; Attendance: 122

9 September 28	Tsukuba	1–0	Waseda	Ishinomaki
14:00	Kotaro Uchino 61'	Report		Stadium: Seihoku Park Ishinomaki Football Field; Attendance: 146

=== Semi-finals ===
12 September 29	Hannan	1–0	Tokyo International	Morioka
13:00	Rinta Miyoshi 71'	Report		Stadium: Iwagin Stadium A Ground; Attendance: 86; Referee: Shoichiro Mikami

12 September 30	Niigata HW	0–0 (a.e.t.) (5–4 p)	Tsukuba	Morioka
13:00		Report		Stadium: Iwagin Stadium B Ground; Attendance: 80; Referee: Takeshi Tsukahara
	Penalties
	Ryusei Akimoto (penalty missed); Kakeru Otsuka (penalty scored); Temmu Matsumoto (penalty scored); Mamoru Naruse (penalty scored); Kosei Yoshida (penalty missed); Kyo Hosoi (penalty scored); Konosuke Takehara (penalty scored)		(penalty missed) Kotaro Uchino; (penalty scored) Keita Fukui; (penalty scored) Sora Okita; (penalty missed) Takato Takeuchi; (penalty scored) Taiga Shimizu; (penalty scored) Shunta Ikeda; (penalty missed) Ryoya Ogawa

=== Final ===
15 September
13:00

Hannan	2–1	Niigata HW
Yu Nakada 3'; Kota Kaneko 90+4'	Report	Azumu Tazawa 1'

Iwagin Stadium, Morioka
Attendance: 1,178
Referee: Kentaro Uematsu

GK	1	(Japan) Taichi Ichikawa
DF	2	(Japan) Riku Ikeda
DF	3	(Japan) Riu Watanabe	(substituted off) 75'
DF	4	(Japan) Shoya Nose (c)
DF	15	(Japan) Kota Kaneko
MF	9	(Japan) Rinta Miyoshi	(substituted off) 87'
MF	10	(Japan) Wigi Kanemoto
MF	11	(Japan) Shunta Morimura	(substituted off) 55'
MF	12	(Japan) So Oda	(substituted off) 55'
MF	14	(Japan) Ayahi Sakurai
FW	20	(Japan) Yu Nakada
Substitutes:
MF	7	(Japan) Takumi Matsui	(substituted in) 55'
MF	27	(Japan) Rin Ogawa	(substituted in) 55'
DF	6	(Japan) Haru Kawabata	(substituted in) 75'
MF	18	(Japan) Ryota Saito	(substituted in) 87'
Manager:
(North Korea) Park Song-gi

GK	1	(Japan) Ryo Momoi
DF	3	(Japan) Mamoru Naruse
DF	4	(Japan) Ryusei Akimoto (c)
DF	5	(Japan) Kyo Hosoi
DF	23	(Japan) Ren Shiraishi
DF	24	(Japan) Kakeru Otsuka
MF	7	(Japan) Azumu Tazawa	(substituted off) 78'
MF	8	(Japan) Ryu Takaashi	(substituted off) 90+4'
MF	10	(Japan) Temmu Matsumoto
MF	13	(Japan) Kira Uenohira	(substituted off) 69'
FW	11	(Japan) Kosei Yoshida
Substitutes:
MF	25	(Japan) Raiki Wakabayashi	(substituted in) 69'
MF	17	(Japan) Yusuke Orihara	(substituted in) 78'
MF	6	(Japan) Konosuke Takehara	(substituted in) 90+4'
Manager:
(Japan) Hirokazu Sakuma

== Top scorers ==
Rank	Player	University	Goals
1	(Japan) Naberu Yoshitaka Furusawa	Tokyo International	4
1	(Japan) Wigi Kanemoto	Hannan	4
3	(Japan) Sota Hirano	Nihon	3
3	(Japan) Junon Nakada	Kyoto Sangyo	3
3	(Japan) Yu Nakada	Hannan	3
3	(Japan) Rinsei Nishi	Waseda	3

== See also ==
- 2023 All Japan University Football Championship
- 2024 All Japan High School Soccer Tournament
- 2024 All Japan University Football Championship
