= Prime Minister's Cup All Japan University Football Tournament =

- Founded: 1977; 49 years ago
- Region: Japan
- Teams: 32
- Current champions: Hannan (2024, 3rd title)
- Most championships: Juntendo; Komazawa (6 titles)
- Website: JFA; JUFA
- 2024 Prime Minister's Cup All Japan University Football Tournament

The Prime Minister's Cup All Japan University Football Tournament (Note: Japanese: 総理大臣杯全日本大学サッカートーナメント, Hepburn: Sōri Daijin-hai Zen Nihon Daigaku Sakkā Tōnamento), mostly known by Prime Minister's Cup, is the secondary football competition for universities across Japan. Since 1977, the year of its first edition, the tournament is held between late August and early September. Winning universities were automatically seeded in the Emperor's Cup. It happened for the last time on 2011. Until 2004, runner-up universities were also given these rights.

On 2023, it was the last time 24 teams participated in the tournament, with eight teams automatically seeded in the second round. From 2024 onwards, 32 teams participates in the tournament, all starting in the same round.

== Past winners ==
In bold, the universities who won both the Prime Minister's Cup and the Intercollegiate at the same year.

Year	Winner	Result	Runners-up
1977	Hosei University	2–1	Waseda University
1978	**Waseda University**	2–1	Hosei University
1979	Kokushikan University	3–1	Chuo University
1980	Hosei University	4–0	Osaka University HSS
1981	University of Tsukuba	3–1	Chuo University
1982	Hosei University	2–1 (a.e.t.)	Aichi Gakuin University
1983	Juntendo University	1–0	University of Tsukuba
1984	**Osaka University of Commerce**	3–2	Osaka University HSS
1985	**Osaka University of Commerce**	2–0	Waseda University
1986	Osaka University HSS	4–0	Waseda University
1987	**Juntendo University**	2–0	University of Tsukuba
1988	University of Tsukuba	2–2 (a.e.t.) (3–1 p.)	Juntendo University
1989	**Juntendo University**	1–0	University of Tsukuba
1990	Juntendo University	3–1	Tokai University
1991	Tokai University	3–2	Kokushikan University
1992	University of Tsukuba	4–0	Fukuoka University
1993	Juntendo University	2–1	University of Tsukuba
1994	Tokyo University of Agriculture	2–0	NIFS Kanoya
1995	**Komazawa University**	2–1	University of Tsukuba
1996	Juntendo University	4–1	Komazawa University
1997	**Komazawa University**	3–0	Hosei University
1998	Waseda University	3–1	Aoyama Gakuin University
1999	**Kokushikan University**	5–2	University of Tsukuba
2000	Tokai University	1–0	Hosei University
2001	Hannan University	2–1	Komazawa University
2002	Komazawa University	5–2	Kokushikan University
2003	Komazawa University	1–1 (a.e.t.) (6–5 p.)	Hannan University
2004	**Komazawa University**	5–2	Momoyama Gakuin University
2005	Kansai University	3–2	Waseda University
2006	Ritsumeikan University	3–1	Fukuoka University
2007	Ryutsu Keizai University	3–1	Shizuoka Sangyo University
2008	Osaka University HSS	2–0	Hannan University
2009	Fukuoka University	3–1	Kochi University
2010	Komazawa University	3–2 (a.e.t.)	Chukyo University
2011	Osaka University HSS	1–0	Chuo University
2012	Hannan University	3–1	Senshu University
2013	Ryutsu Keizai University	3–2	Meiji University
2014	**Ryutsu Keizai University**	2–1	Hosei University
2015	**Kwansei Gakuin University**	2–0	Meiji University
2016	Meiji University	1–0	Juntendo University
2017	Hosei University	1–0	Meiji University
2018	Meiji University	2–0	Osaka University HSS
2019	**Meiji University**	2–1	Hosei University
2020	Cancelled due to the COVID-19 pandemic		
2021	Hosei University	2–1	Toyo University
2022	Kokushikan University	2–1	Osaka Gakuin University
2023	Fuji University	2–1	Kwansei Gakuin University
2024	Hannan University	2–1	Niigata University HW
