= Katsuyuki =

- Gender: Male

Origin
- Origin: Japanese
- Meaning: Different meanings depending on the kanji used

Katsuyuki (written: 勝之, 勝幸, 勝征, 克幸, 克行 or 克行) is a masculine Japanese given name. Notable people with the name include:

- Katsuyuki Abe (阿部 勝幸), Japanese table tennis player
- Katsuyuki Aihara (相原 勝幸; born 1983), Japanese baseball player
- Katsuyuki Dobashi (土橋 勝征; born 1968), Japanese baseball player
- Katsuyuki Hiranaka (平中 克幸; born 1981), Japanese racing driver
- Katsuyuki Hirano (平野 勝之; born 1964), Japanese film director
- Katsuyuki Itakura (板倉 克行; 1943–2014), Japanese jazz pianist
- Katsuyuki Kawachi (河内 勝幸; born 1955), Japanese footballer
- Katsuyuki Kawai (河井 克行; born 1963), Japanese politician
- Katsuyuki Kiyomiya (清宮 克幸; born 1967), Japanese rugby union player and coach
- Katsuyuki Kondō (近藤 勝之; born 1945), Japanese martial artist
- Katsuyuki Konishi (小西 克幸; born 1973), Japanese voice actor
- Katsuyuki Masuchi (増地 克之; born 1970), Japanese judoka
- Katsuyuki Minami (南 克幸; born 1970), Japanese volleyball player
- Katsuyuki Miyajima (宮嶋 克幸; born 1995), Japanese skeleton racer
- Katsuyuki Miyazawa (宮沢 克行; born 1976), Japanese footballer
- Katsuyuki Murai (村井 克行) born 1969, Japanese actor
- Katsuyuki Nakasuga (中須賀 克行; born 1981), Japanese motorcycle racer
- Katsuyuki Saito (斎藤 克幸; born 1973), Japanese footballer
- Katsuyuki Sakai (坂井 克行; born 1988), Japanese rugby union player
- Katsuyuki Tanamura (棚村 克行; born 1989), Japanese water polo player
