= Kodai Sato =

Japanese footballer

Personal information
- Full name: Kodai Sato
- Date of birth: August 24, 1985 (age 41)
- Place of birth: Miyagi, Japan
- Height: 1.73 m (5 ft 8 in)
- Position: Forward

Youth career
- 2004–2007: Fuji University

Senior career*
Years	Team	Apps	(Gls)
2008–2011	NEC Tokin	41	(28)
2012–2014	Grulla Morioka	48	(34)
2015	Vanraure Hachinohe	20	(3)
Total		109	(65)
- * Club domestic league appearances and goals

Kodai Sato (佐藤 幸大, Satō Kōdai; born August 24, 1985) is a former Japanese football player.

== Playing career ==
Kodai Sato played for NEC Tokin, Grulla Morioka and Vanraure Hachinohe from 2008 to 2015.
