= Gifu Nagaragawa Meadow =

Athletic stadium in Gifu, Japan

Coordinates: 35.445167°N 136.766222°E

- 長良川球技メドウ
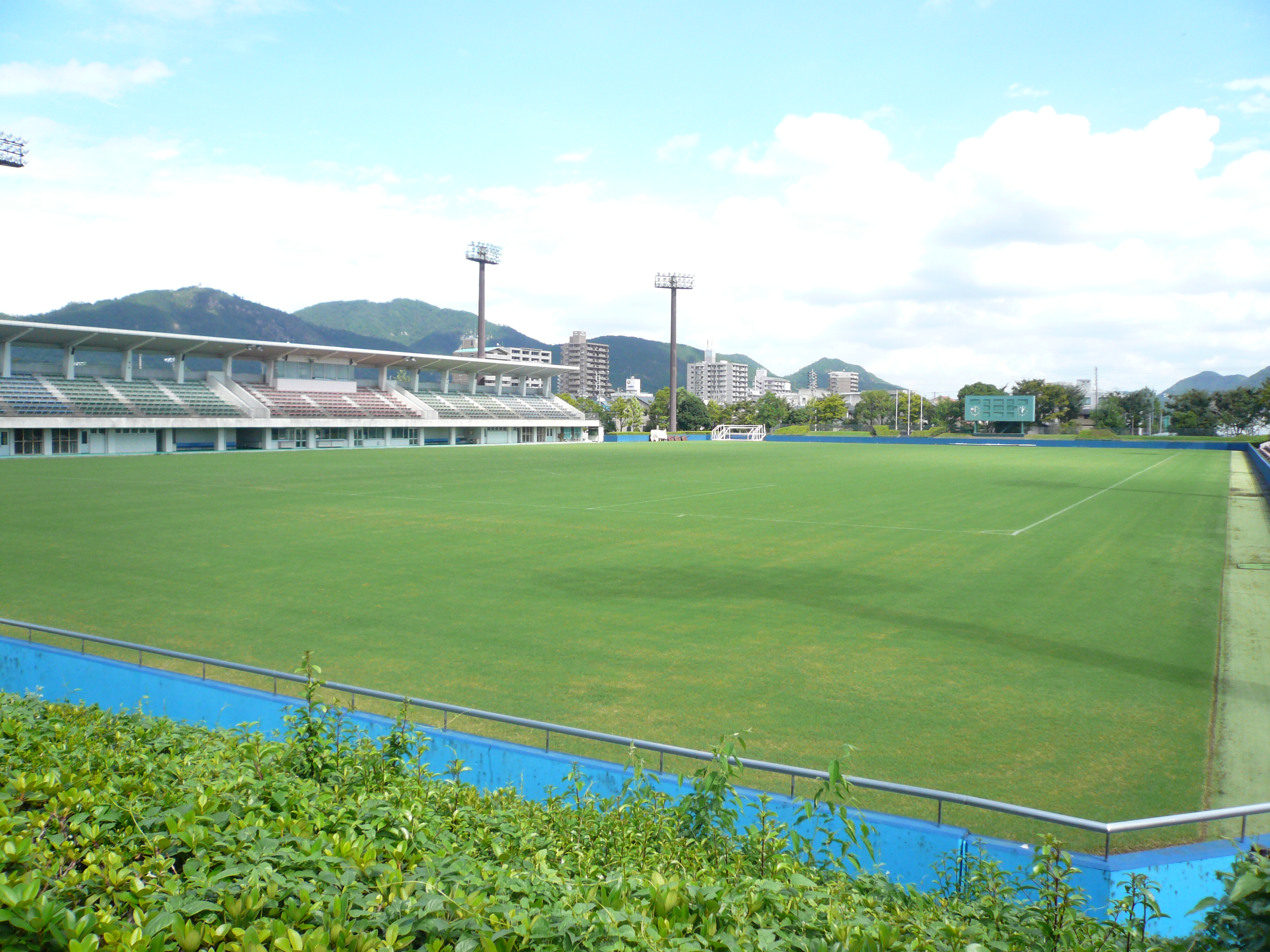
- Location: Gifu, Gifu, Japan
- Owner: Gifu Prefecture
- Capacity: 3,560

Gifu Nagaragawa Meadow (長良川球技メドウ) is an athletic stadium located in Gifu Memorial Center, Gifu, Gifu Prefecture, Japan.

It was one of the home stadiums of football club FC Gifu from 2010 to 2012.
