= Koshiro Sumi =

Japanese association football player

Koshiro Sumi 角 昂志郎
Personal information
- Full name: Koshiro Sumi
- Date of birth: 13 August 2002 (age 24)
- Place of birth: Tokyo, Japan
- Height: 1.65 m (5 ft 5 in)
- Position: Midfielder

Team information
- Current team: Gamba Osaka
- Number: 39

Youth career
- –2017: Tokyo Musashino City
- 2018–2020: FC Tokyo

College career
Years	Team	Apps	(Gls)
2021–2024	University of Tsukuba		

Senior career*
Years	Team	Apps	(Gls)
2019	FC Tokyo U-23	7	(0)
2024–2026	Júbilo Iwata	55	(5)
2026–	Gamba Osaka	4	(0)

International career
2017	Japan U15	12	(4)
2017–2018	Japan U16	18	(0)
2019	Japan U17	4	(0)
Medal record
Men's football
Representing Japan
Asian Games
Silver medal – second place	2022 Hangzhou	Team
- * Club domestic league appearances and goals as of 13:19, 12 October 2026 (UTC)

Koshiro Sumi (角 昂志郎, Sumi Kōshirō; born 13 August 2002) is a Japanese footballer who plays as a midfielder for J1 League club Gamba Osaka.

== Early career ==
Sumi developed in the youth systems of Yokogawa Musashino FC and Tokyo Musashino City before joining FC Tokyo U-18. As a youth player, he was part of the Japanese team that won the 2014 Danone Nations Cup, which the Japan Football Association described as the first victory by a Japanese team in the competition.

Although primarily an attacking midfielder, he was also used as an attacking right-back during his time with Japan's youth national teams.

== International career ==
Sumi was selected for the Japan U-17 squad at the 2019 FIFA U-17 World Cup in Brazil. He appeared as a late substitute in Japan's 0–0 group-stage draw with the United States on 30 October 2019.

== Club career ==
While studying at the University of Tsukuba, Sumi agreed to join Júbilo Iwata for the 2025 season. On 19 March 2024, he was approved by the Japan Football Association as a JFA/J.League Special Designated Player, allowing him to represent Júbilo Iwata while remaining registered with his university team.

== Career statistics ==
As of 12 October 2026.

Appearances and goals by club, season and competition
Club	Season	League			National cup (Note: Includes Emperor's Cup)		League cup (Note: Includes J.League Cup)		Continental		Other		Total	
Club	Season	Division	Apps	Goals	Apps	Goals	Apps	Goals	Apps	Goals	Apps	Goals	Apps	Goals
FC Tokyo U-23	2019	J3 League	7	0	–		–		–		–		7	0
University of Tsukuba	2022	–			2	1	–		–		–		2	1
University of Tsukuba	2023	–			1	1	–		–		–		1	1
University of Tsukuba	2024	–			3	0	–		–		–		3	0
University of Tsukuba	Total		0	0	6	2	0	0	0	0	0	0	6	2
Júbilo Iwata	2024	J1 League	1	0	0	0	1	0	–		0	0	2	0
Júbilo Iwata	2025	J2 League	34	4	1	0	5	0	–		1 (Note: Appearance in J1/J2 play-offs)	0	41	4
Júbilo Iwata	2026	J2/J3 (100)	18	1	–		–		–		0	0	18	1
Júbilo Iwata	2026–27	J2 League	2	0	1	0	0	0	–		0	0	3	0
Júbilo Iwata	Total		55	5	2	0	6	0	0	0	1	0	64	5
Gamba Osaka	2026–27	J1 League	4	0	0	0	1	0	1 (Note: Appearances in AFC Champions League Elite)	1	–		6	1
Career total			66	5	8	2	7	0	1	1	1	0	83	8

== Honours ==
Japan U16

- AFC U-16 Championship: 2018
