= Katsuyuki Aihara =

Japanese baseball player

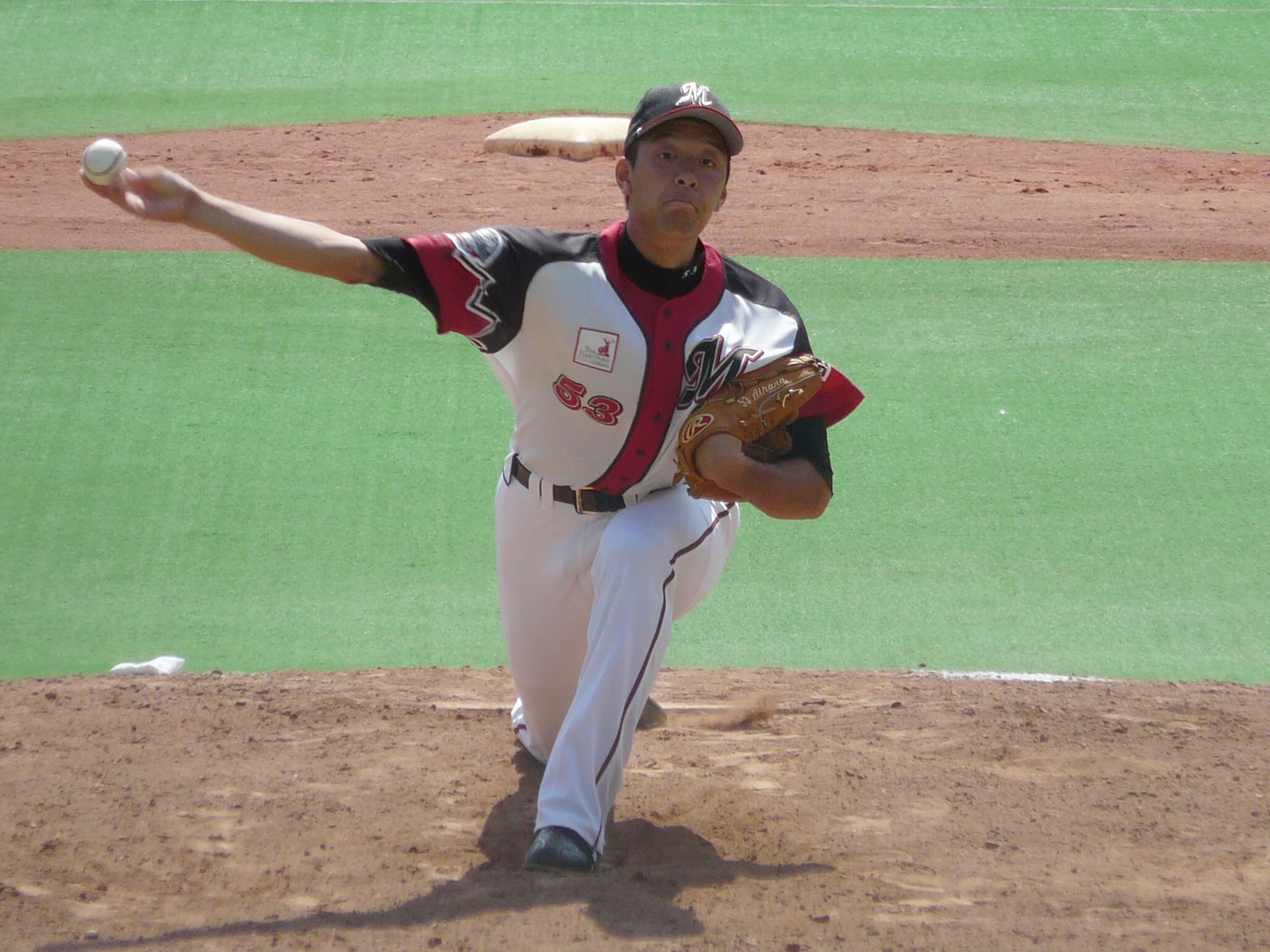
- Pitcher
- Born: July 24, 1983 (age 42); Saitama, Japan
- Bats: Right Throws: Right

debut
- 2006, for the Chiba Lotte Marines

Career statistics (through 2008)
- Win–loss: 0–0
- ERA: 6.43
- Strikeouts: 2

Teams
- Chiba Lotte Marines (2006–2010)

Katsuyuki Aihara (相原 勝幸, Aihara Katsuyuki; born July 24, 1983) is a professional Japanese Nippon Professional Baseball player. He is currently with the Chiba Lotte Marines.
