= Nippon Bunri University =

Private university in Ōita, Ōita, Japan

Coordinates: 33.231298°N 131.725757°E

- 日本文理大学 (Nippon bunri daigaku)
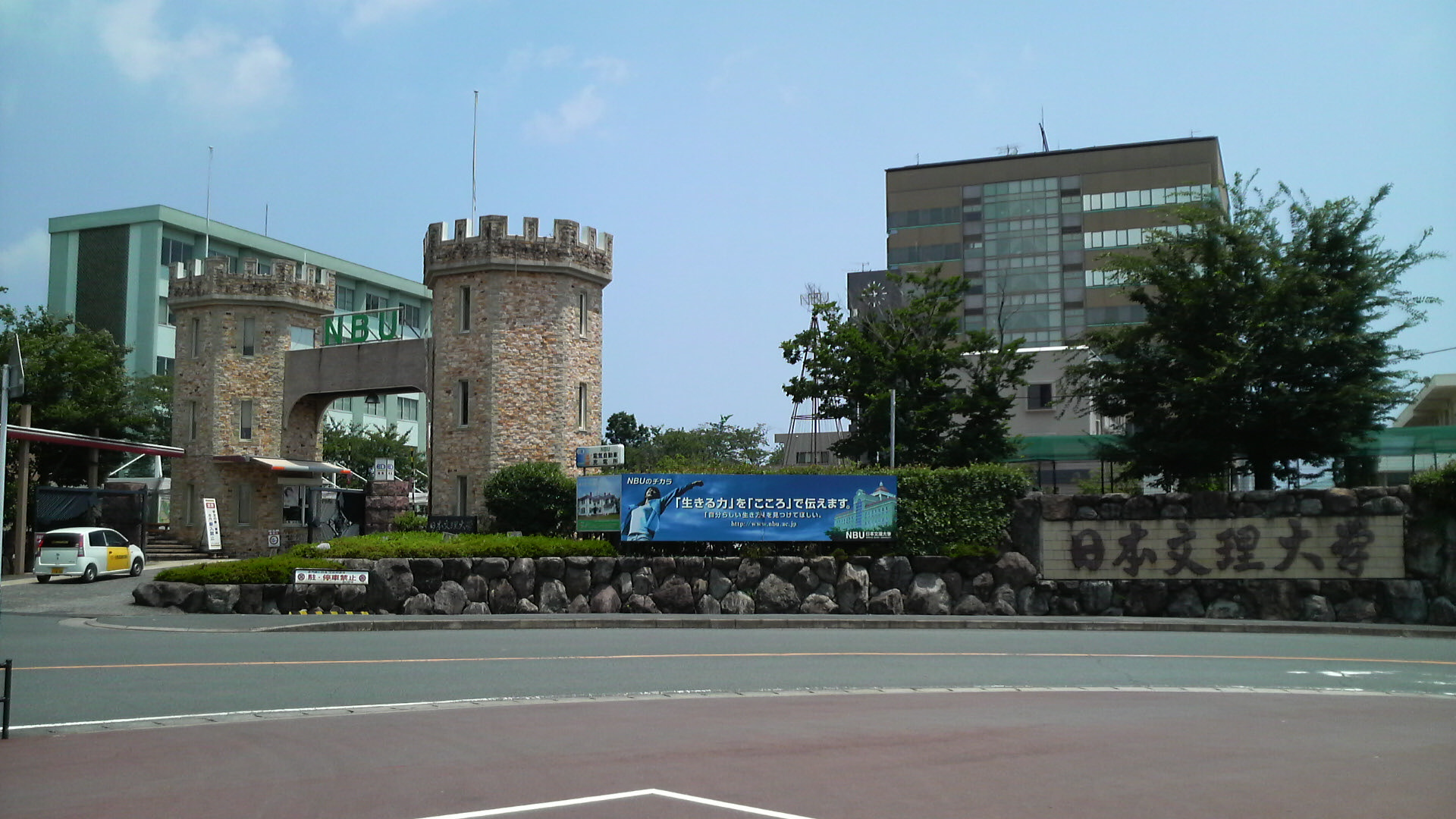
- Nippon Bunri University main gate
- Type: Private
- Established: 1967
- Location: Ōita (大分市, Ōita-shi), Ōita Prefecture (大分県), Japan
- Campus: Ōzai Campus (大在キャンパス)
- Website: NBU (in Japanese)

Nippon Bunri University (日本文理大学, Nippon bunri daigaku) is a private university in Ōita, Ōita, Japan. The school was established in 1967 and adopted its present name in 1982.
