= Fuji University =

Coordinates: 39.360163°N 141.104958°E

- 富士大学
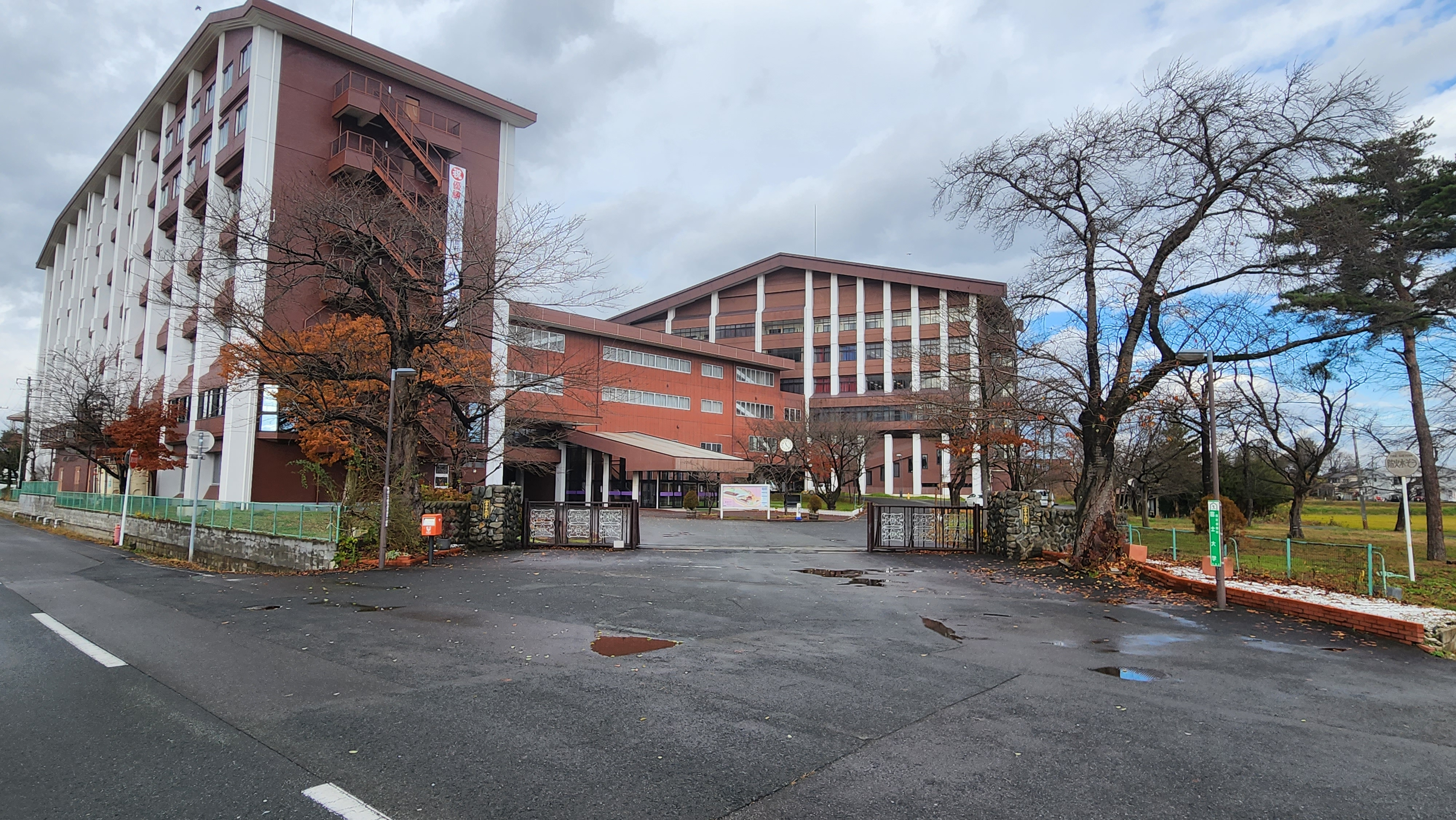
- Former names: Ōshū University
- Type: Private
- Established: 1965

Fuji University (富士大学, Fuji daigaku) is a private university in Hanamaki, Iwate, Japan, established in 1965. Prior to 1976, it was known as Ōshū University (奥州大学, Ōshū daigaku). The university focuses on economics, offering courses on economics and business law, as well as teacher training and library science.

== Notable alumni ==
- Katsuyuki Aihara baseball player
- Diego Franca baseball player
- Kyohei Nakamura baseball player
- Misaki Ozawa field hockey player
- Kodai Sato football player
- Makoto Sawaguchi basketball player
- Shigehiro Taguchi basketball player
- Tokuichiro Tamazawa politician
- Shuta Tonosaki baseball player
- Hotaka Yamakawa baseball player
