= Osaka Gakuin University =

Private liberal arts university in Osaka Prefecture, Japan

Coordinates: 34°46′25.3″N 135°32′29.6″E

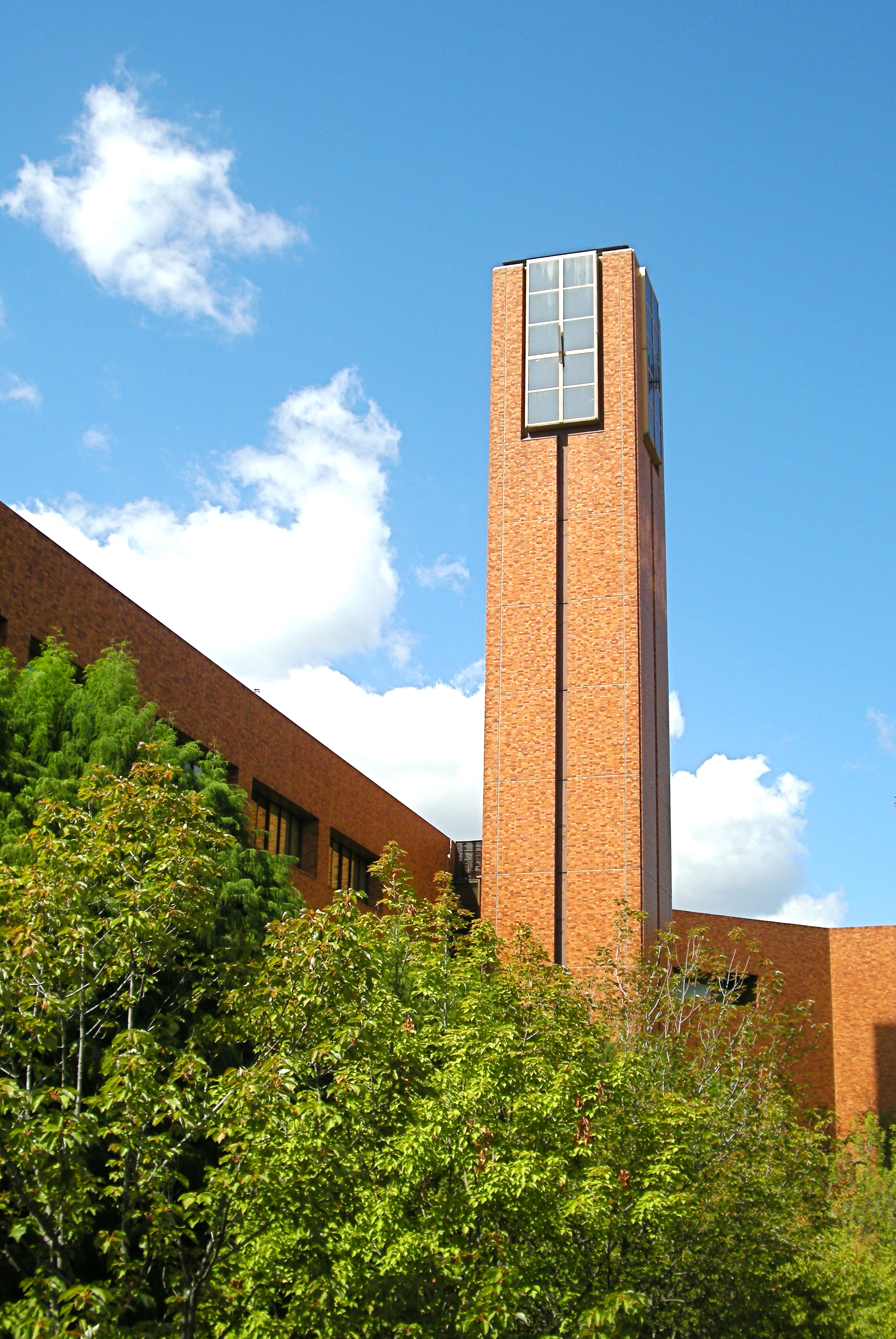
Clock tower

Osaka Gakuin University (大阪学院大学, Ōsaka Gakuin Daigaku), also known as Osaka Graduate University (OGU), is a mid-sized, mid-level private liberal arts university located in Suita, Osaka Prefecture, Japan. The university focuses on law, economics, and international studies, but still provides a wide array of other subjects for study.

== History/Background ==
Osaka Gakuin University was founded in 1963, from the previous establishment, Kansai Kenri Senmon Gakko. The school was subsequently refurbished and expanded during the 1990s.

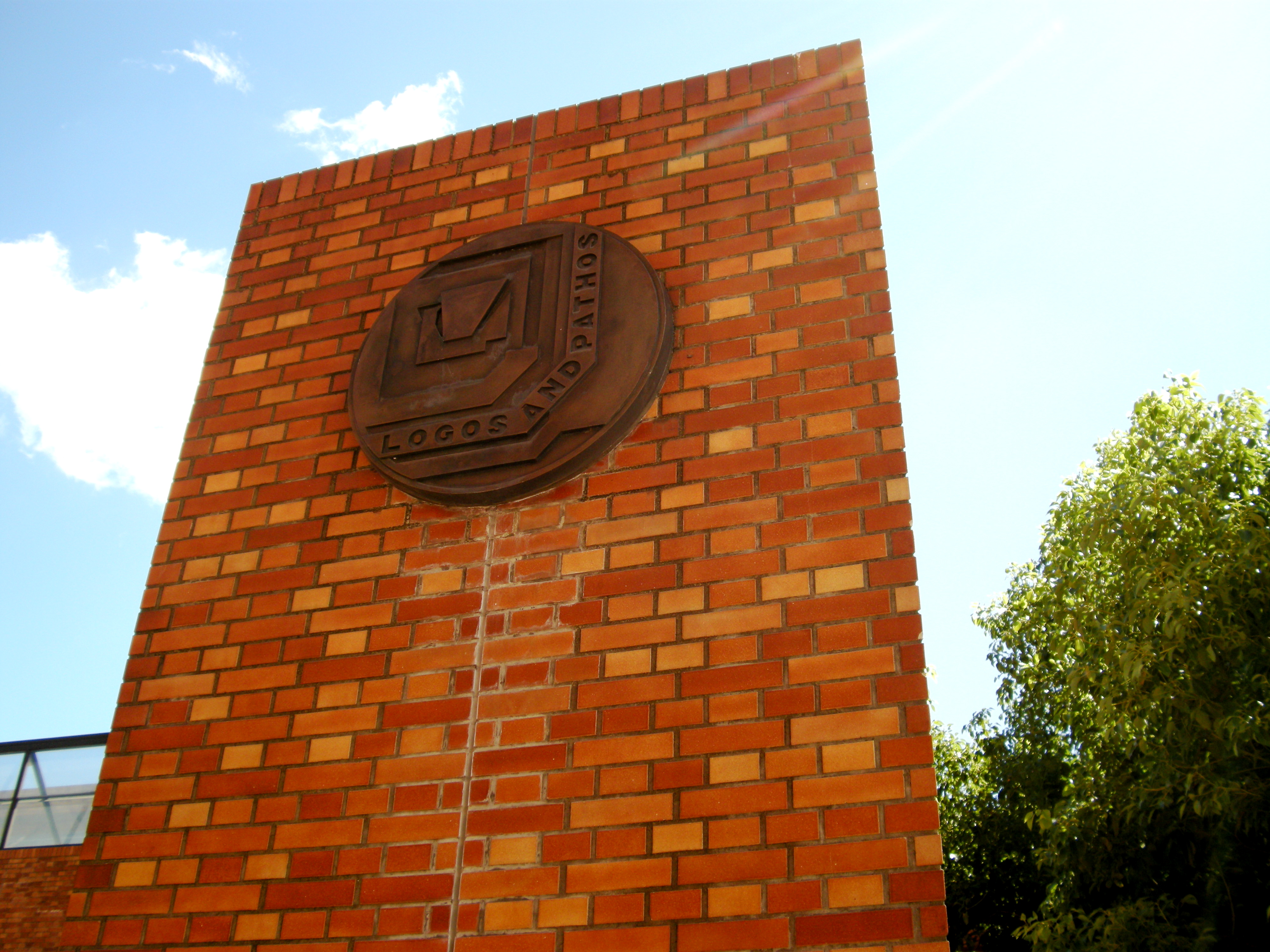
Emblem

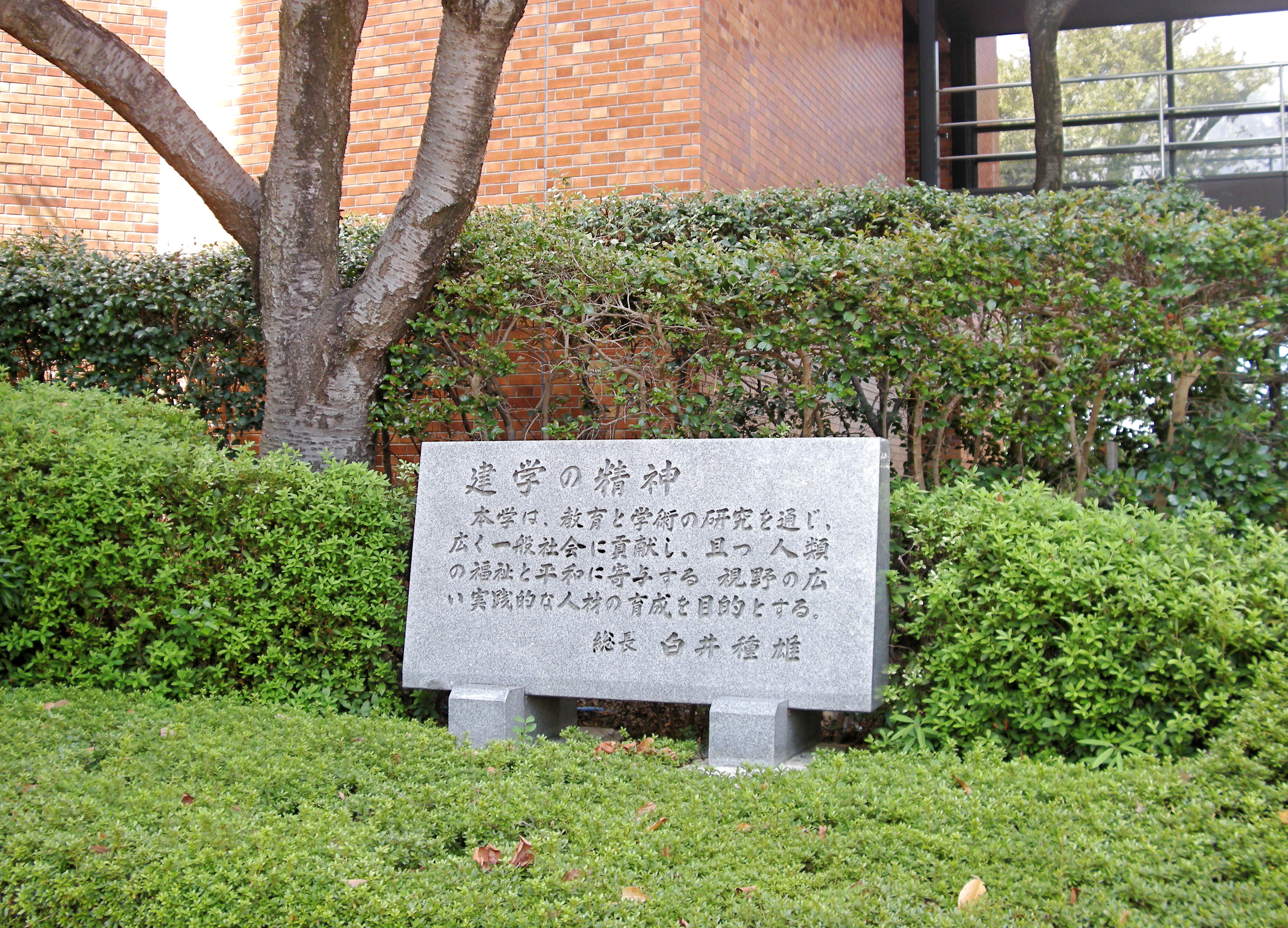
Entrance

=== Historical Overview ===
- 1940 – Kansai Accounting Institute founded.
- 1952 – Kansai Accounting School founded.
- 1953 – Kansai Business College founded.
- 1959 – Osaka Gakuin University High School founded.
- 1962 – Osaka Gakuin Junior College founded (Department of Business Administration).
- 1963 – Osaka Gakuin University founded (Faculty of Commerce, Department of Commerce)
- 1964 – Addition of Departments of Business Administration and Economics to Faculty of Commerce.
- 1967 – Graduate School of Commerce founded(Master's program).
- 1969 – Doctoral program established in Graduate School of Commerce.
- 1970 – Faculty of Economics established. Division of Correspondence Study established.
- 1974 – Faculty of Law established. Faculty of Foreign Languages established. Graduate School of Economics founded (Master's Program).
- 1976 – Doctoral program established in Graduate School of Economics.
- 1987 – Addition of Department of International Studies (Junior College).
- 1990 – Faculty of International Studies founded.
- 1994 – Division and Reorganization of Faculty of Commerce: Department of Commerce reorganized into Faculty of Distribution and Communication Sciences, Department of Business Administration reorganized into Faculty of Administrative Sciences, Graduate School of International Studies founded (Master's Program)
- 1995 – Graduate School of Law founded(Master's program).
- 1996 – Doctoral program established in Graduate School of International Studies.
- 1997 – Doctoral program established in Graduate School of Law.
- 2000 – Department of Law and Policy established in Faculty of Law; Faculty of Informatics (Department of Informatics) and Faculty of Corporate Intelligence (Department of Corporate Intelligence) founded.
- 2001 – Division of Correspondence Study (Faculty of Commerce, Department of Commerce) renamed Division of Correspondence Study, Faculty of Distribution and Communication Sciences, Department of Distribution and Communication Sciences.
- 2004 – Graduate School of Legal Profession ("Law School") established.
- 2005 – Graduate School of Computer Science founded (Master's Program).
- 2006 – Faculty of Law (Department of Law, Department of Law and Policy) reorganized as Faculty of Law (Department Law).

=== Founding Principles ===
Founder Taneo Shirai stated that Osaka Gakuin University seeks to develop individuals of both practical ability and broad vision, who can serve society at large and contribute to the peace and welfare of humankind.

== Academics ==
=== Majors ===
- Distribution and Communication Sciences: Students study the mechanism of distribution economics, in addition to marketing principles and practices, using as materials case studies of corporate activities. Studies also extend to such related areas as accounting, finance, psychology, trade and information systems.
- Business Administration: Students acquire related background knowledge and specialized theories, and cultivate their practical ability to apply it to the resolution of complex and diverse problems that may be encountered in actual administrative activities.
- Economics: Students learn how to analyze, and form firm views regarding, society, and to effectively express their ideas and analyses.
- Law: Courses cover principle laws, including constitutional, civil, criminal and commercial laws, as well as laws attracting growing social interest, such as those related to foreign, environmental, consumer and social security affairs. Students also learn basic research skills, including how to collect and consult documented reference materials, advancing from discussions of daily legal problems to understanding and interpreting more specialized legal subject matter.
- Foreign Languages: The students are expected to master the four basic language skills (reading, writing, listening, and speaking), obtain a good understanding of the culture of the languages they learn, and solidify their own cultural identity.
- International Studies: The curriculum is designed to deepen students' understanding of each zone's culture, history, politics, economics, religion, customs etc., so that they may acquire knowledge and skills necessary for active work in the 21st-century multicultural global community.
- Informatics: Informatics Course is concerned with exploring innovative IT applications in natural and human sciences. Students concentrate either on life sciences dealing with earth and living organisms or on information processing and transmission in human and social sciences such as psychology and linguistics.
- Corporate Intelligence: Corporate Intelligence is a new interdisciplinary field whose central pillars of study and research are accounting and information science, complemented by commerce, business administration, economics, law, philosophy, ethics etc., in which information is studied systematically and comprehensively as a network of intelligence in a business context.

== Campus ==
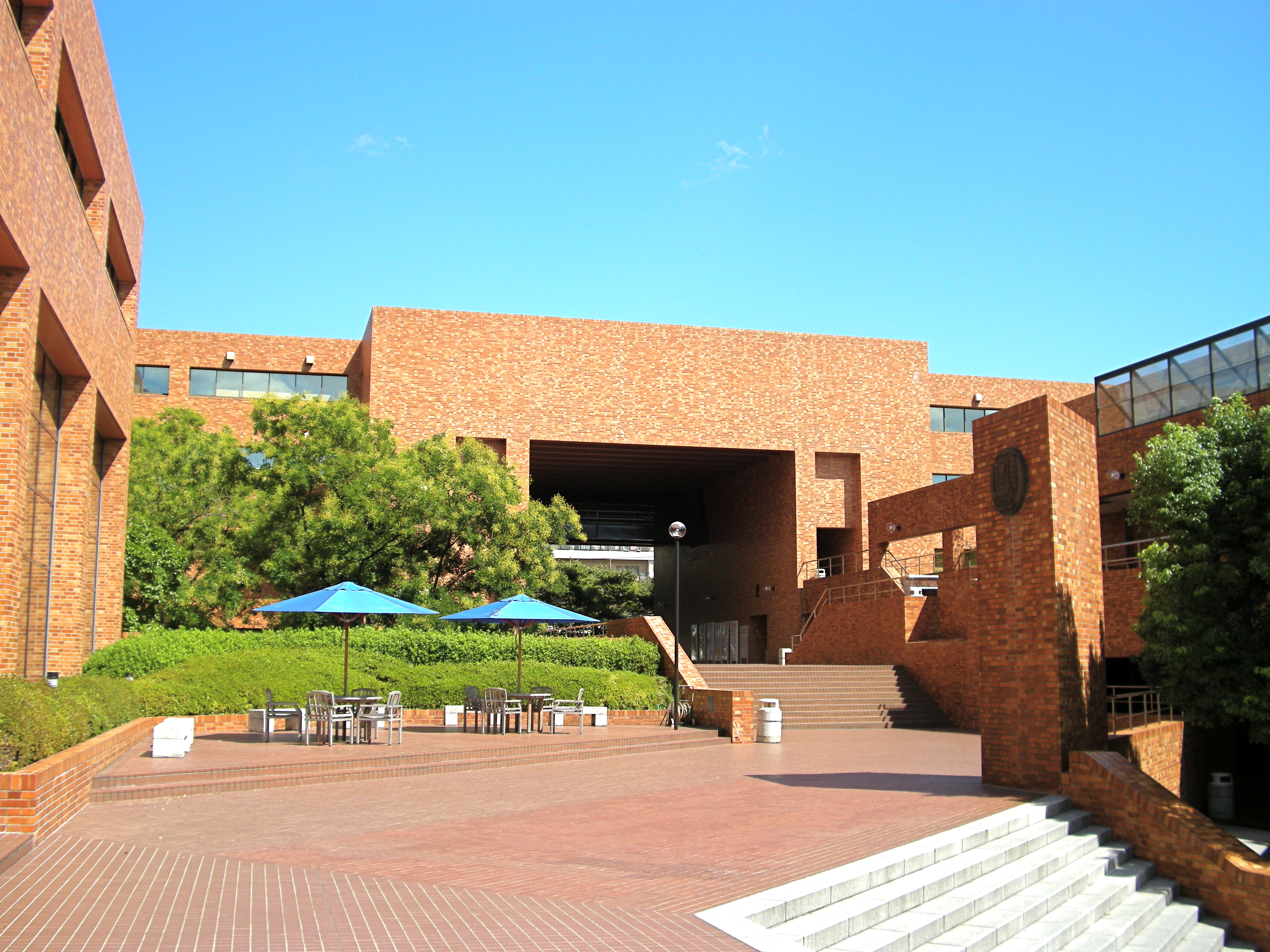
Campus

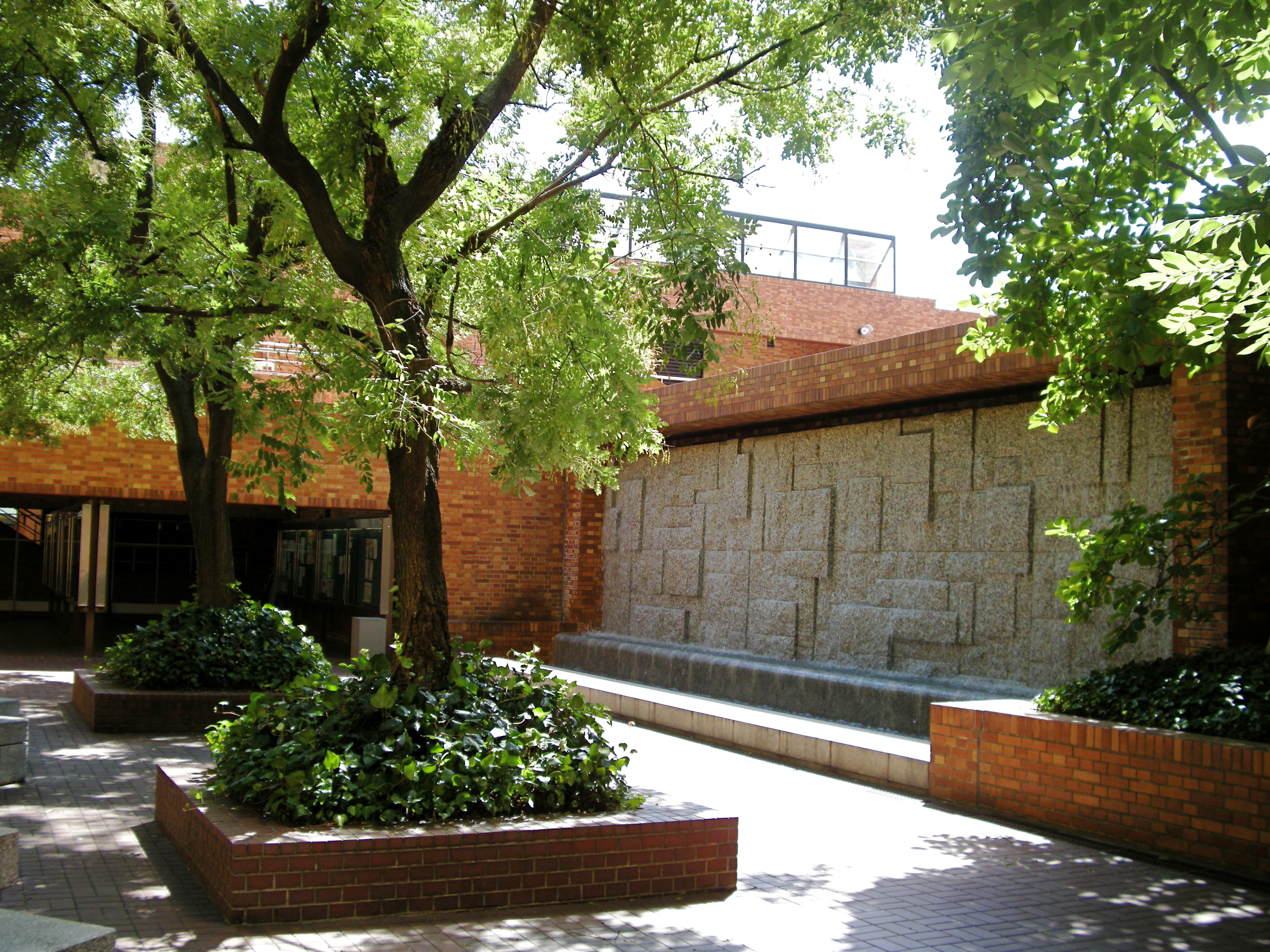
Fountain

- MELOP: MELOP is a members' multimedia facility that opened on the basement floor of Building No. 12 in October 1997 and extended to the third and fourth floors of Building No. 3 in October 1998. MELOP is well equipped with hardware and software that cover a wide range of fields and functions, from widely used Microsoft Office (Word, Excel, PowerPoint, etc.) to more sophisticated devices and software for computer graphics, video and sound editing (video captor, MIDI, etc.). MELOP organizes, and can be used for, seminars, group and independent activities and the like, so that its members, including beginner computer users, can acquire and improve multimedia skills useful for their future academic activities and career development. In October 2004, MELOP reopened, renovated in line with its new concept "Technology as a Tool. Acquire Useful IT Skills." In this new environment, MELOP provides solid support through new seminars and updated equipment (Building No. 12, from 18 October 2004) to help members fulfill their needs and achieve individual goals.
- I-Chat Lounge: The International Chat Lounge (I-Chat) provides students with a welcoming place where they can strengthen their communication skills in international languages and broaden their awareness of cultures around the world. At the I-Chat Lounge, students can have interactions with native English speakers and foreign exchange students, play skill-building language games and attend fun events that encourage friendship and cultural awareness.
- Library: The Library is the center of university education and research. Today's advanced computerization has largely transformed the Library from a conventional facility with the simple functions of storing and lending books and references. At Osaka Gakuin University, the Library is positioned as an information center featuring the latest computer equipment that encourages independent learning.
- Book Store
- Student Cafeteria

== Student life ==
=== Events ===
- OGU Workshops: OGU Workshops are designated to "university and other open seminars," which the Board of Education of Osaka Prefecture organizes in collaboration with universities and other educational institutions, so as to provide school teachers with a variety of training opportunities and support their voluntary training, with the objective of improving the quality of their teaching.
- Digital Storytelling Festival: The Digital Storytelling Festival is an open competition for original stories composed using presentation software such as PowerPoint.
- Sports Workshop: Since academic year 2001, Osaka Gakuin University has been holding Sports Workshops for junior and senior high school students. The Rugby Workshop features rugby coaches and players invited from prestigious university teams of Great Britain, the birthplace of rugby. The Golf Workshop features professional golfers as instructors, from whom the participants learn techniques, rules and manners for improving their golfing, as well as golfing and social manners.
- Phoenix Festival: Each year Osaka Gakuin University organizes a series of events in diverse fields, within the framework of the "Phoenix Festival." The primary objective is to fulfill the University's Founding Principle of "developing individuals who have both practical ability and broad vision," while making this Founding Principle known to many people by contributing to the general public's enjoyment and cultural development.
- Cultural Lectures: Osaka Gakuin University organizes Cultural Lectures by a variety of personalities and specialists active in their respective fields, to further enhance University student life. The lectures help expand students' horizons and stimulate their studies and future plans.
- Kishibe Festivals: Kishibe Festival is held for four days in late October each year, mainly organized by the Kishibe Festival Executive Committee, composed of University students. During the Festival, student clubs and circles give performances and presentations, hold talks and exhibitions, run shops and stands, and welcome fellow students, faculty, alumni, and the general public to have fun together.

=== Student organizations ===
- Sports-track clubs:American football, Archery, Badminton, Baseball, Basketball, Fencing, Fishing, Golf, Handball, Ice Hockey, Kyūdō, Judo, Karate, Kendo, Lacrosse, Nippon Kenpo, Rubber Baseball, Rugby football, Shorinji Kenpo, Skiing, Soccer, Softball Tennis, Swimming, Table Tennis, Tennis, Track and Field, Volleyball, Youth Hosteling
- Culture-track clubs: Accounting, American Folksongs, Archaeology, Calligraphy, Comic Narration, Company Studies, Fine Arts, Free Arts, Light Music, Literature, Management, Photography, Science of Divination, Tax Studies, Tea Ceremony
- Independent clubs: Brass Band, Broadcasting Station, Choir, Cheerleading, Newspaper, Pep Squad

== Graduate school ==
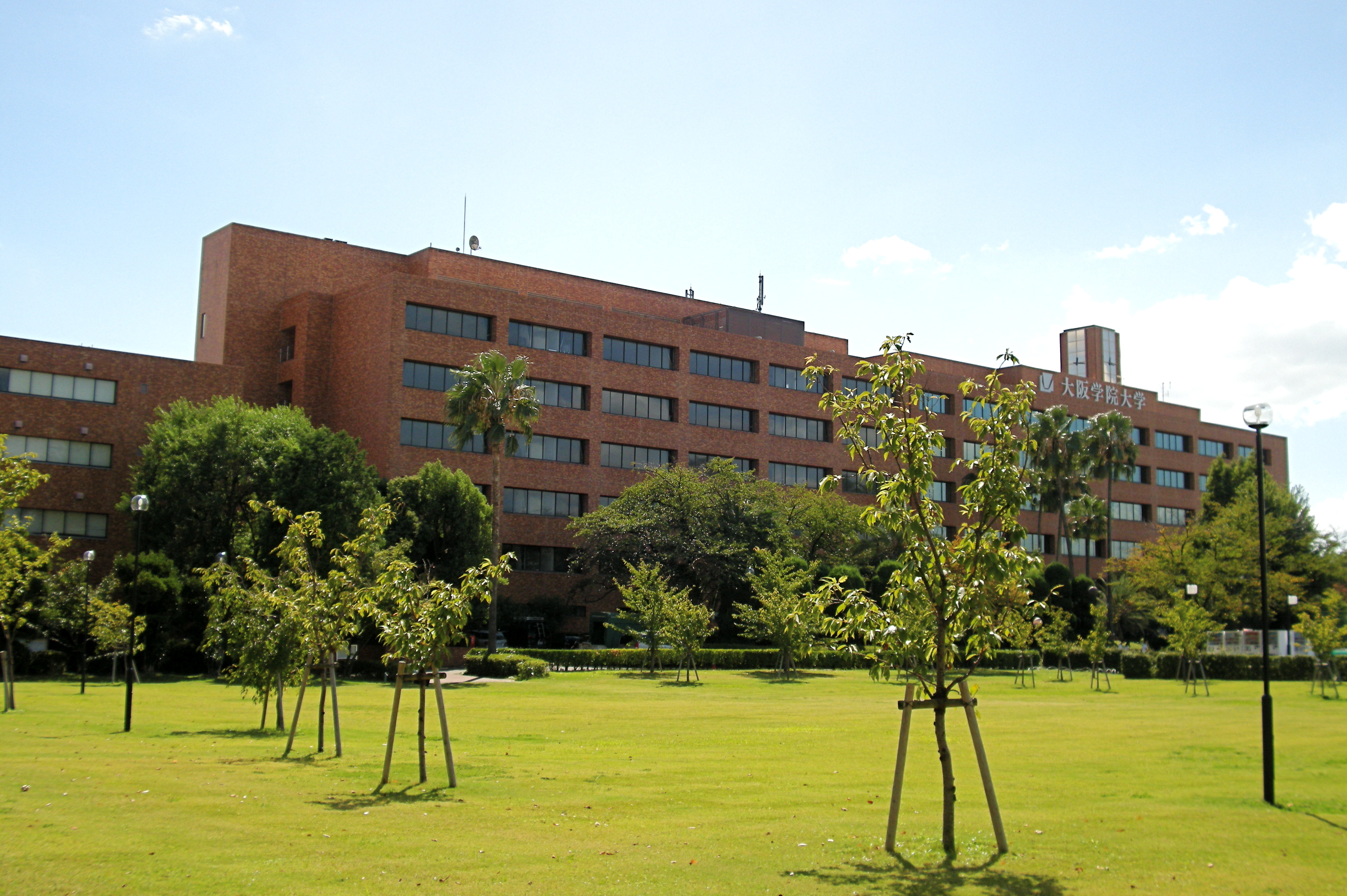
OGU

- Commerce: The Graduate School of Commerce is intended for business-related research, mainly for students having completed undergraduate studies in the Faculties of Distribution and Communication Sciences, Administrative Sciences and Corporate Intelligence.
- Economics: The Graduate School of Economics conducts education and research in a wide range of specialized fields, from theoretical and applied economics to finance, tax law and economic history. Special educational consideration is also given to students wishing to become tax accountants, and advanced education in economics is offered to those who wish to work in research institutions.
- International Studies: The Graduate School of International Studies pursues education and research by specialists in international relations and international cultures. In the former domain of specialization, the issues of contemporary society regarding law, economics, business, development, environment and so on are examined in an interdisciplinary manner. In the latter domain, international comparative studies are pursued in terms of culture, folk customs, language, religion and so forth.
- Law: The Graduate School of Law conducts education and research to train students toward becoming legal affairs experts capable of working effectively even amid such changes. On the two tracks of specialization.
- Computer Science: The School of Computer Science offers instruction to support students' research on themes relating to highly dependable system design, system CAD, information interface, software development, intelligent information media, information security, network application etc. in the main fields of multimedia, network, VLSI system.
- Law School: The students are expected to become legal professionals who play the important role since the rule of law covers even the smallest aspects of people's lives. As legal problems and conflicts are expected to become increasingly diverse and complex, a large number of highly qualified legal professionals are needed.

== International Exchange ==
The university has been actively promoting intercultural understanding in its education, carrying out various exchange programs via the University's network of 18 universities in eight countries around the world. These programs include programs focusing mainly on language training and exposure to cultural diversity, longer overseas stays for studies, and overseas internships enabling students to gain working experience in an international environment, thereby learning intercultural sensibility and practical skills. For their unique content, not found in other universities' overseas programs, OGU's internships are drawing much attention.

=== OGU Global Network ===
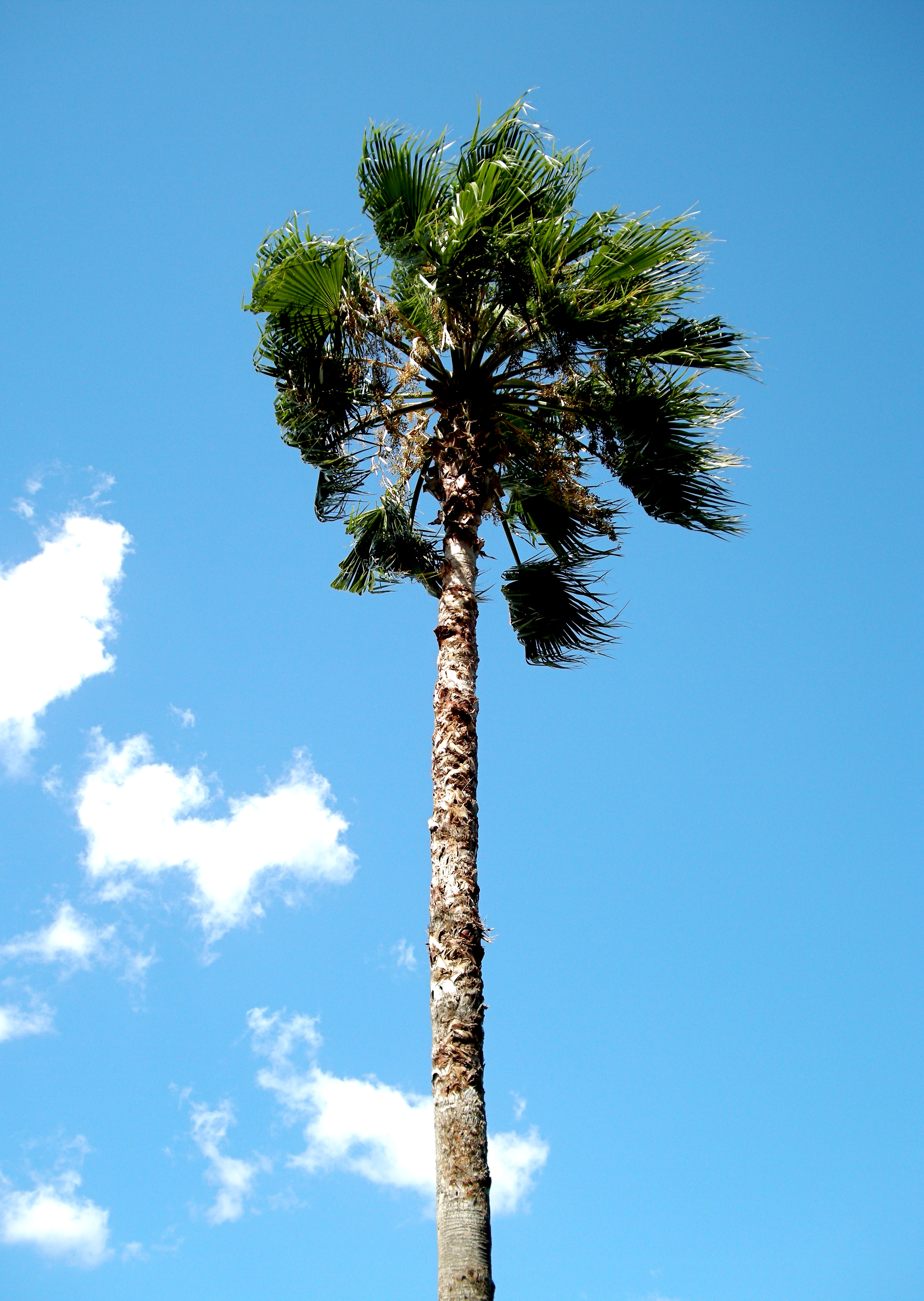
Palm tree

- United Kingdom
  - Queens' College, University of Cambridge
- United States
  - University of Alaska Fairbanks
  - University of St. Thomas
  - University of California Los Angeles
  - California State University Long Beach
  - Dowling College
  - Marywood University
  - University of Mississippi
  - Hawaii Pacific University
  - University of Hawaiʻi at Mānoa
  - Kapiʻolani Community College
- Mexico
  - Cetys University
- Finland
  - HAAGA-HELIA University of Applied Sciences
  - Laurea University of Applied Sciences
  - Satakunta University of Applied Sciences
- Iceland
  - University of Iceland
- France
  - University of Paris IX (Paris-Dauphine)
  - University of Orléans
- Germany
  - University of Bayreuth
  - University of Trier
  - Johannes Gutenberg University of Mainz
- Austria
  - FH Kufstein University of Applied Sciences
- Netherlands
  - HZ University of Applied Sciences
  - Fontys University of Applied Sciences
- Sweden
  - University of Gävle
  - Växjö University
- Lithuania
  - Vilnius University
- South Africa
  - Nelson Mandela Metropolitan University
- Australia
  - University of the Sunshine Coast
- New Zealand
  - University of Waikato
- China
  - Fudan University
  - Southwest University of Political Science & Law
  - Dalian Polytechnic University
  - Southwestern University of Finance and Economics
- Taiwan
  - Southern Taiwan University
  - Providence University
- South Korea
  - Soonchunhyang University
  - Baekche University
- Thailand
  - Bangkok University
- Philippines
  - University of San Carlos

== Graduates ==
Politics

- Kinoshita Motonori – Congressional deputy of Okayama Prefecture, Democratic Party.

Business

- Humino Naoki – President of Eat & Co.

Literature/Arts

- Shoji Kazunobu – Artist

Entertainment

Musicians:

- Okano Akihito – Musician, Porno Graffitti
- Suikazura – Folk singer
- Clearance – A cappella Vocal group
- Slow Riders – Rock band
- Uchikoshi Motohisa – Musician, Radio DJ

Actors:

- Nakabayashi Taiki – Actor
- Yamada Masato – Actor
- Isaka Yuuko – Model, actor
- Miura Tsuyoshi – Actor
- Ishida Hiroshi – Actor
- Arita Hiroyuki – Voice actor

Comedians:

- Hukuda Mitsunori – Comedian, tutor
- Torihada Minoru – Comedian
- Keisuke – Comedian
- Shouhukutei Jinpuku – Rakugo storyteller
- Tatekawa Bunto – Rakugo storyteller
- Katsura Bunya – Rakugo storyteller

Sports

- Takahashi Naoko – Former national marathon runner
- Shimomura Eiji – Former national volleyball player
- Yoshida Kuniaki – Former national volleyball player
- Sasaki Hayato – Professional soccer player
- Ishibitsu Yousuke – Professional soccer player, National team
- Sasagaki Ryousuke – Professional soccer player
- Hashigaito Kouichi – Professional soccer player
- Inada Kouji – Professional soccer player
- Senoo Ryousuke – Professional soccer player
- Baba Yutaka – Professional soccer player
- Okamura Kazuya – Professional soccer player
- Katou Kenta – Professional soccer player
- Yoshii Naoto – Professional soccer player
- Marutani Yuuichi – Professional soccer player
- Danshoku Dino – Professional wrestler
- Konno Shouta – Professional basketball player
- Nishikawa Masato – Professional baseball player
- Hujii Masashi – Former Professional baseball player
- Kobayashi Hiroshi – Amateur baseball player

Mass Media

- Uenosono Kimihide – Writer, director
- Yamada Satsuki – Former news anchor
- Kanda Toshiaki – IT journalist
