= 2026 Vissel Kobe season =

Vissel Kobe
2026 season
- Chairman: Yuki Chifu
- Manager: Michael Skibbe
- Stadium: Noevir Stadium Kobe; Hyōgo-ku, Kōbe, Hyōgo
- J1 League: West Region: 1st Play-offs: Winners
- AFC Champions League Elite: Semi-finals
- Top goalscorer: League: Ren Komatsu; Yoshinori Muto; Takahiro Ogihara (3 each); All: Yoshinori Muto (6 goals)
Home colours	Away colours

The 2026 Vissel Kobe season is their 60th season in existence.

== Squad ==
=== Season squad ===
Squad no.	Name	Nationality	Date of birth	Last Club
Goalkeepers
1	Daiya Maekawa	(Japan)	9 August 1994 (age 31)	(Japan) Kansai University
21	Shota Arai	(Japan)	1 November 1988 (age 37)	(Japan) JEF United Chiba
32	Richard Monday Ubong	(Japan) (Nigeria)	1 October 2005 (age 20)	(Japan) Fukuchiyama Seibi High School
39	Shioki Takayama	(Japan)	13 June 2001 (age 24)	(Japan) FC Ryukyu
71	Shūichi Gonda	(Japan)	3 March 1989 (age 37)	(Hungary) Debreceni
Defenders
3	Matheus Thuler	(Brazil)	10 March 1999 (age 27)	(France) Montpellier HSC
4	Tetsushi Yamakawa	(Japan)	1 October 1997 (age 28)	(Japan) University of Tsukuba
15	Diego	(Brazil)	21 September 1995 (age 30)	(Japan) Kashiwa Reysol
16	Caetano	(Brazil)	24 June 1999 (age 26)	(Brazil) Corinthians
23	Rikuto Hirose	(Japan)	23 September 1995 (age 30)	(Japan) Kashima Antlers
24	Gōtoku Sakai	(Japan) (United States)	14 March 1991 (age 35)	(Germany) Hamburger SV
31	Takuya Iwanami	(Japan)	18 June 1994 (age 31)	(Japan) Urawa Red Diamonds
41	Katsuya Nagato	(Japan)	15 January 1995 (age 31)	(Japan) Yokohama F. Marinos
42	Justin Homma	(Japan) (United States)	26 August 2005 (age 20)	(Japan) Matsumoto Yamaga
43	Kaito Yamada	(Japan)	31 August 2006 (age 19)	(United States) Tacoma Defiance
57	Ryosuke Irie	(Japan)	5 November 2004 (age 21)	(Japan) Juntendo University
80	Boniface Nduka	(Japan) (Nigeria)	15 February 1996 (age 30)	(Japan) Yokohama FC
Midfielders
2	Nanasei Iino	(Japan)	2 October 1996 (age 29)	(Japan) Sagan Tosu
5	Yuta Goke	(Japan)	30 June 1999 (age 26)	(Japan) Vegalta Sendai
6	Takahiro Ogihara	(Japan)	5 October 1991 (age 34)	(Japan) Yokohama F. Marinos
7	Yosuke Ideguchi	(Japan)	23 August 1996 (age 29)	(Japan) Avispa Fukuoka
13	Daiju Sasaki	(Japan)	17 September 1999 (age 26)	(Brazil) Palmeiras
14	Takashi Inui	(Japan)	2 June 1988 (age 38)	(Japan) Shimizu S-Pulse
18	Haruya Ide	(Japan)	25 March 1994 (age 32)	(Japan) Tokyo Verdy
19	Makoto Mitsuta	(Japan)	20 July 1999 (age 26)	(Japan) Gamba Osaka
25	Yuya Kuwasaki	(Japan)	15 May 1998 (age 28)	(Japan) V-Varen Nagasaki
28	Kento Hamasaki	(Japan)	16 June 2007 (age 18)	Youth Team
30	Kakeru Yamauchi	(Japan)	6 January 2002 (age 24)	(Japan) University of Tsukuba
33	Rikuto Hashimoto	(Japan)	2 April 2005 (age 21)	(Japan) Roasso Kumamoto
38	Juzo Ura	(Japan)	21 May 2004 (age 22)	(Japan) Kataller Toyama
44	Mitsuki Hidaka	(Japan)	11 May 2003 (age 23)	(Spain) CD Atlético Paso
51	Taiga Seguchi	(Japan)	10 January 2008 (age 18)	Youth Team
58	Sota Onishi	(Japan)	12 April 2007 (age 19)	Youth Team
Forwards
10	Yuya Osako	(Japan)	18 May 1990 (age 36)	(Germany) Werder Bremen
11	Yoshinori Muto	(Japan)	15 July 1992 (age 33)	(Spain) SD Eibar
26	Jean Patric	(Brazil)	14 July 1997 (age 28)	(Japan) Cerezo Osaka
29	Ren Komatsu	(Japan)	10 September 1998 (age 27)	(Japan) Blaublitz Akita
40	Kotaro Uchino	(Japan)	19 June 2004 (age 21)	(Denmark) Brondby IF
46	Sota Ito	(Japan)	24 September 2007 (age 18)	(Japan) Kyoto Tachi High School
53	Hayato Watanabe	(Japan)	6 April 2007 (age 19)	Youth Team
55	Yuta Miyahara	(Japan)	7 April 2005 (age 21)	(Poland) Górnik Zabrze B
Players left on loan during season
9	Taisei Miyashiro	(Japan)	26 May 2000 (age 26)	(Japan) Kawasaki Frontale
17	Tatsunori Sakurai	(Japan)	26 July 2002 (age 23)	(Japan) Sagan Tosu
34	Yusei Ozaki	(Japan)	26 July 2003 (age 22)	(Japan) Blaublitz Akita
36	Shuto Adachi	(Japan)	15 July 2004 (age 21)	(Japan) Thespa Gunma
37	Shogo Terasaka	(Japan)	6 June 2004 (age 22)	(Japan) FC Gifu
	Haruka Motoyama	(Japan)	5 June 1999 (age 27)	(Japan) Fagiano Okayama
Players who left club during / mid-season

Last updated: 17 January 2024.
Source: Vissel Kobe website

== Club officials ==
Club officials for 2026.

Position	Name
Manager	(Germany) Michael Skibbe
Head Coacr	(Germany) Serhat Umar
Assistant coaches	(Japan) Masafumi Nakaguchi (Japan) Hideo Hashimoto
Coaches	(Japan) Tadahiro Akiba (Japan) Kosuke Takeya
Goalkeeper coach	(Japan) Takuya Matsumoto
Asst & U21 Goalkeeper coach	(Japan) Daiki Tomii
Physical coach	(Japan) Takeshi Ikoma (Japan) Yoshinori Furube (Japan) Toshiki Yoshimitsu
Conditioning coach	(Japan) Hikaru Fujii

== Friendly ==
=== Tour of Okinawa (11 Jan - 24 Jan) ===
13 January 1	FC Naha	–	Vissel Kobe	Okinawa
				Stadium: Nishihara Town Athletics Stadium

17 January 2	Okinawa International University	–	Vissel Kobe	Okinawa
				Stadium: Nishihara Town Athletics Stadium

20 January 3	–	Vissel Kobe	Okinawa
			Stadium: Nishihara Town Athletics Stadium

== Transfers ==
=== In ===
Pre-season

Date	Position	Player	Transferred from	Ref
Permanent Transfer
18 December 2025	GK	(Japan) Yuya Tsuboi	(Japan) Omiya Ardija	End of loan
25 December 2025	MF	(Japan) Yuta Goke	(Japan) Vegalta Sendai	Free
27 December 2025	FW	(Japan) Takashi Inui	(Japan) Shimizu S-Pulse	Free
28 December 2025	DF	(Japan) Kaito Yamada	(United States) Tacoma Defiance	End of loan
29 December 2025	MF	(Japan) Tatsunori Sakurai	(Japan) Sagan Tosu	End of loan
30 December 2025	MF	(Japan) Rikuto Hashimoto	(Japan) Roasso Kumamoto	End of loan
2 January 2026	MF	(Japan) Shuto Adachi	(Japan) Thespa Gunma	End of loan
3 January 2026	MF	(Japan) Juzo Ura	(Japan) Kataller Toyama	End of loan
3 January 2026	MF	(Japan) Mitsuki Saito	(Japan) Kyoto Sanga FC	End of loan
4 January 2026	GK	(Japan) Shioki Takayama	(Japan) FC Ryukyu	End of loan
4 January 2026	DF	(Japan) (Nigeria) Boniface Nduka	(Japan) Yokohama FC	Free
4 January 2026	DF	(Japan) Shogo Terasaka	(Japan) FC Gifu	End of loan
4 January 2026	DF	(Japan) (United States) Justin Homma	(Japan) Matsumoto Yamaga FC	End of loan
4 January 2026	DF	(Japan) Haruka Motoyama	(Japan) Fagiano Okayama	End of loan
5 January 2026	DF	(Japan) Yusei Ozaki	(Japan) Blaublitz Akita	End of loan
9 January 2026	MF	(Brazil) Diego	(Japan) Kashiwa Reysol	Free
Loan Transfer
6 March 2026	FW	(Japan) Kotaro Uchino	(Denmark) Brondby IF	Season loan

Mid-season

Date	Position	Player	Transferred From	Ref
Permanent Transfer
Loan Transfer
28 March 2026	FW	(Japan) Makoto Mitsuta	(Japan) Gamba Osaka	Season loan

=== Out ===
Pre-season

Date	Position	Player	Transferred To	Ref
Permanent Transfer
18 December 2025	DF	(Japan) (Indonesia) Riku Matsuda	(Thailand) BG Pathum United	Free
19 December 2025	GK	(Japan) Yuya Tsuboi	(Japan) Yokohama F. Marinos	Free
25 December 2025	DF	(Japan) Yuki Honda	(Japan) Shimizu S-Pulse	Free
27 December 2025	MF	(Japan) Koya Yuruki	(Japan) Kashiwa Reysol	Free
28 December 2025	DF	(Japan) Yuta Koike	(Japan) Tochigi City	Free
29 December 2025	MF	(Japan) Tatsunori Sakurai	(Japan) Sagan Tosu	End of loan
30 December 2025	GK	(Japan) (Nigeria) Powell Obinna Obi	(Japan) Avispa Fukuoka	Undisclosed
4 January 2026	MF	(Japan) Mitsuki Saito	(Japan) Kyoto Sanga FC	Free
6 January 2026	MF	(Brazil) Gustavo Klismahn	(Portugal) Santa Clara	End of loan
6 January 2026	FW	(Brazil) Erik	(Japan) Machida Zelvia	End of loan
Loan Transfer
3 January 2026	MF	(Japan) Shuto Adachi	(Japan) Thespa Gunma	Season loan
5 January 2026	DF	(Japan) Shogo Terasaka	(Japan) Zweigen Kanazawa	Season loan
5 January 2026	DF	(Japan) Haruka Motoyama	(Japan) Fagiano Okayama	Season loan
6 January 2026	DF	(Japan) Yusei Ozaki	(Japan) RB Omiya Ardija	Season loan
17 January 2026	FW	(Japan) Taisei Miyashiro	(Spain) Las Palmas	Season loan

== Competitions ==
=== J1 League ===
Pos	Team	Pld	W	PKW	PKL	L	GF	GA	GD	Pts	Qualification
1	Vissel Kobe	18	9	2	4	3	27	21	+6	35	Final
2	Cerezo Osaka	18	7	4	2	5	26	19	+7	31	3rd–4th place playoff
3	Nagoya Grampus	18	8	2	3	5	31	28	+3	31	5th–6th place playoff
4	Sanfrecce Hiroshima	18	8	2	2	6	29	21	+8	30	7th–8th place playoff
5	Gamba Osaka	18	5	5	3	5	26	22	+4	28	9th–10th place playoff
6	Fagiano Okayama	18	6	2	4	6	24	25	−1	26	11th–12th place playoff
7	Shimizu S-Pulse	18	4	4	4	6	19	21	−2	24	13th–14th place playoff
8	Kyoto Sanga	18	5	3	2	8	19	26	−7	23	15th–16th place playoff
9	V-Varen Nagasaki	18	6	1	1	10	20	28	−8	21	17th–18th place playoff
10	Avispa Fukuoka	18	3	4	4	7	17	27	−10	21	19th–20th place playoff

Source: JLeague.co, J.League Data Site
Rules for classification: 1) Points; 2) Goal difference; 3) Goals scored; 4) Head-to-head.

==== Matches ====
6 February 1	Kyoto Sanga	1–1 (1–4 p)	Vissel Kobe	Kyoto
	Marco Túlio 53'; Yoshinori Suzuki (yellow card) 2'; João Pedro (yellow card) 61'	Report	Yoshinori Muto 37'; Takahiro Ogihara (yellow card) 90+5'	Stadium: Sanga Stadium by Kyocera; Attendance: 15,083; Referee: Koichiro Fukushima
	Penalties
	Rafael Elias (penalty missed); Masaya Okugawa (penalty scored); Hidehiro Sugai (penalty missed)		Yoshinori Muto (penalty scored); Matheus Thuler (penalty scored); Takahiro Ogihara (penalty scored); Jean Patric (penalty scored)

13 February 2	Vissel Kobe	2–0	V-Varen Nagasaki	Kobe
	Gotoku Sakai 25'; Daiju Sasaki 42'; Yosuke Ideguchi (yellow card) 53'	Report	Hotaru Yamaguchi (yellow card) 12'; Ryosuke Shindo (yellow card) 51'; Yusei Egawa (yellow card) 55'	Stadium: Noevir Stadium Kobe; Attendance: 18,633; Referee: Hiroyuki Kimura

21 February 3	Shimizu S-Pulse	1–0	Vissel Kobe	Shizuoka
	Oh Se Hun 55' (pen.); Haruto Hidaka (yellow card) 24'; Yutaka Yoshida (yellow card) 74'; Toshiki Takahashi (yellow card) 89'	Report	Tetsushi Yamakawa (red card) 19'; Yosuke Ideguchi (yellow card) 31'; Matheus Thuler (yellow card) 76'	Stadium: IAI Stadium Nihondaira; Attendance: 16,584; Referee: Koei Koya

27 February 4	Vissel Kobe	2–1	Avispa Fukuoka	Kobe
	Yoshinori Muto 53'; Ren Komatsu 60'	Report	Yu Hashimoto 90'; Tomoya Miki (red card) 31'; Shahab Zahedi (yellow card) 48'; Masato Shigemii (yellow card) 88'; Masaya Tashiro (yellow card) 90+1'	Stadium: Noevir Stadium Kobe; Attendance: 11,556; Referee: Futoshi Nakamura

27 March 5 (Rescheduled)	Vissel Kobe	2–1	Sanfrecce Hiroshima	Kobe
	Takahiro Ogihara 85' (pen.); Yuya Osako 90+4'; Mitsuki Hidaka (yellow card) 10'; Matheus Thuler (yellow card) 53'; Diego (yellow card) 90+3'	Report	Kosuke Kinoshita 50'	Stadium: Noevir Stadium Kobe; Attendance: 19,200; Referee: Koichiro Fukushima

14 March 6	Nagoya Grampus	0–3	Vissel Kobe	Toyota
	Tsukasa Morishima (yellow card) 43'; Marcus Vinicius (yellow card) 81'	Report	Ren Komatsu 12'; Yosuke Ideguchi 58'; Katsuya Nagato 88'	Stadium: Toyota Stadium; Attendance: 35,041; Referee: Masuya Ueda

18 March 7	Vissel Kobe	2–2 (3–5 p)	Gamba Osaka	Kobe
	Ren Komatsu 6'; Jean Patric 90+4'; Yosuke Ideguchi (yellow card) 46'; Michael Skibbe (yellow card) 64'	Report	Deniz Hümmet 23'; Ryoya Yamashita 83'; Ryo Hatsuse (yellow card) 80'	Stadium: Noevir Stadium Kobe; Attendance: 21,690; Referee: Koji Takasaki
	Penalties
	Matheus Thuler (penalty missed); Takahiro Ogihara (penalty scored); Jean Patric (penalty scored); Katsuya Nagato (penalty scored)		Harumi Minamino (penalty scored); Ryotaro Meshino (penalty scored); Shuto Abe (penalty scored); Kanji Okunuki (penalty missed); Genta Miura (penalty scored)

22 March 8	Cerezo Osaka	1–1 (6–5 p)	Vissel Kobe	Osaka
	Rikito Inoue 13'; Solomon Sakuragawa (yellow card) 81'	Report	Mitsuki Hidaka 68'; Caetano (yellow card) 33'; Takahiro Ogihara (yellow card) 57'	Stadium: Yodoko Sakura Stadium; Attendance: 20,496; Referee: Koei Koya
	Penalties
	Shinji Kagawa (penalty scored); Dion Cool (penalty scored); Shunta Tanaka (penalty scored); Shinnosuke Hatanaka (penalty scored); Rikito Inoue (penalty scored); Masaya Shibayama (penalty scored)		Takahiro Ogihara (penalty scored); Kōtarō Uchino (penalty scored); Katsuya Nagato (penalty scored); Mitsuki Hidaka (penalty scored); Jean Patric (penalty scored); Kento Hamasaki (penalty missed)

5 April 9	Fagiano Okayama	1–4	Vissel Kobe	Okayama
	Takaya Kimura 63'; Masaya Matsumoto (yellow card) 25'	Report	Gotoku Sakai 9'; Katsuya Nagato 45'; Takahiro Ogihara 66' (pen.); Yuta Goke 88' (yellow card) 3'; Boniface Nduka (yellow card) 83'	Stadium: JFE Harenokuni Stadium; Attendance: 14,633; Referee: Atsushi Kamimura

11 April 10	Vissel Kobe	3–2	Nagoya Grampus	Kobe
	Gōtoku Sakai 27'; Daiju Sasaki 68' (pen.); Yoshinori Muto 82'; Tetsushi Yamakawa (yellow card) 79'	Report	Yudai Kimura 30'; Tsukasa Morishima 53'; Tomoki Takamine (yellow card) 19'	Stadium: Noevir Stadium Kobe; Attendance: 19,847; Referee: Ryo Tanimoto

1 April 11 (Rescheduled)	Vissel Kobe	2–0	Shimizu S-Pulse	Kobe
	Katsuya Nagato 28'; Takahiro Ogihara 61' (pen.); Matheus Thuler (yellow card) 90+3'	Report	Kenta Inoue (yellow card) 73'	Stadium: Noevir Stadium Kobe; Attendance: 10,069; Referee: Hiroyuki Kimura

13 May 12 (Rescheduled)	Vissel Kobe	1–0	Kyoto Sanga	Kobe
	Boniface Nduka 78'; Makoto Mitsuta (yellow card) 90+5'	Report	João Pedro (yellow card) 41'	Stadium: Noevir Stadium Kobe; Attendance: 14,587; Referee: Takafumi Mikuriya

29 April 13	Vissel Kobe	0–0 (2–4 p)	Cerezo Osaka	Kobe
	Yumeki Yokoyama (yellow card) 50'	Report	Yosuke Ideguchi (yellow card) 78'; Mitsuki Hidaka (yellow card) 90+3'	Stadium: Noevir Stadium Kobe; Attendance: 25,724; Referee: Koichiro Fukushima
	Penalties
	Yuya Osako (penalty scored); Mitsuki Hidaka (penalty scored); Katsuya Nagato (penalty missed); Jean Patric (penalty missed)		Shinji Kagawa (penalty scored); Shunta Tanaka (penalty scored); Dion Cools (penalty scored); Motohiko Nakajima (penalty scored)

2 May 14	Gamba Osaka	5–0	Vissel Kobe	Osaka
	Harumi Minamino 22', 53'; Genta Miura 36'; Kanji Okunuki 80'; Deniz Hümmet 82'	Report	Yoshinori Muto (yellow card) 45+1'	Stadium: Suita City Football Stadium; Attendance: 33,314; Referee: Koki Nagamine

6 May 15	Sanfrecce Hiroshima	1–1 (4–5 p)	Vissel Kobe	Hiroshima
	Mutsuki Kato 42'; Sota Nakamura (yellow card) 75'; Taichi Yamasaki (yellow card) 77'	Report	Ren Komatsu 63'; Yosuke Ideguchi (yellow card) 53'; Matheus Thuler (yellow card) 71'	Stadium: Edion Peace Wing Hiroshima; Attendance: 27,028; Referee: Futoshi Nakamura
	Penalties
	Kosuke Kinoshita (penalty missed); Akito Suzuki (penalty scored); Shunki Higashi (penalty scored); Ryo Germain (penalty scored); Sho Sasaki (penalty scored)		Yuya Osako (penalty scored); Yoshinori Muto (penalty scored); Mitsuki Hidaka (penalty scored); Rikito Inoue (penalty scored); Ren Komatsu (penalty scored)

10 May 16	Vissel Kobe	0–3 (4–5 p)	Fagiano Okayama	Kobe
		Report	Yoshitake Suzuki 28'; Ataru Esaka 43'; Takaya Kimura 88'; Werik Popo (yellow card) 44'	Stadium: Noevir Stadium Kobe; Attendance: 20,713; Referee: Koji Takasaki

17 May 17	V-Varen Nagasaki	2–2 (3–2 p)	Vissel Kobe	Nagasaki
	Hotaru Yamaguchi 20'; Dudu 44'; Hijiri Onaga (yellow card) 64'; Diego Pituca (yellow card) 90+1'	Report	Yoshinori Muto 26'; Matheus Thuler 30'; Caetano (yellow card) 36'	Stadium: Peace Stadium; Attendance: 20,361; Referee: Damian Kos (Poland)
	Penalties
	Matheus Jesus (penalty scored); Ryogo Yamasaki (penalty missed); Norman Campbell (penalty scored); Diego Pituca (penalty scored)		Yoshinori Muto (penalty missed); Rikuto Hirose (penalty missed); Makoto Mitsuta (penalty scored); Jean Patric (penalty scored); Daiju Sasaki (penalty missed)

23 May 18	Avispa Fukuoka	0–1	Vissel Kobe	Fukuoka
	Kaoru Yamawaki (yellow card) 23'; Teppei Oka (yellow card) 39'; Abdel Hanan Sani Brown (yellow card) 90+3'	Report	Matheus Thuler 45+3'	Stadium: Best Denki Stadium; Attendance: 9,573; Referee: Daichi Shiino

30 May Placement Leg 1	Vissel Kobe	5–0	Kashima Antlers	Kobe
	Yuya Osako 27', 49', 90+4'; Diego 69'; Ren Komatsu 88' (pen.); Gōtoku Sakai (yellow card) 45+1'	Report	Gaku Shibasaki (yellow card) 55'	Stadium: Noevir Stadium Kobe; Attendance: 24,431; Referee: Akihiko Ikeuchi

6 June Placement Leg 2	Kashima Antlers	2–0 (2–5 agg.)	Vissel Kobe	Kashima
	Haruki Hayashi 68'; Koki Anzai 70'; Kei Chinen (yellow card) 68'; Yuta Higuchi (yellow card) 87'; Ikuma Sekigawa (yellow card) 90+1'	Report		Stadium: Kashima Soccer Stadium; Attendance: 29,826; Referee: Koichiro Fukushima

=== AFC Champions League ===
==== League stage ====
Win Draw Loss

17 September 2025 MD 1	Shanghai Port (China)	0–3	(Japan) Vissel Kobe	Shanghai, China
	Zhang Linpeng (yellow card) 89'	Report	Erik 19'; Taisei Miyashiro 40'; Yuya Osako 44'	Stadium: Pudong Football Stadium; Attendance: 12,966; Referee: Choi Hyun-jai (South Korea)

1 October 2025 MD 2	Vissel Kobe (Japan)	1–0	(Australia) Melbourne City	Kobe, Japan
	Koya Yuruki 90+4'; Ren Komatsu (yellow card) 75'	Report	Nathaniel Atkinson (yellow card) 31'; Samuel Souprayen (yellow card) 61'; Besian Kutleshi (yellow card) 84'; Germán Ferreyra (yellow card) 90+3'	Stadium: Noevir Stadium Kobe; Attendance: 5,119; Referee: Rustam Lutfullin (Uzbekistan)

22 October 2025 MD 3	Gangwon FC (South Korea)	4–3	(Japan) Vissel Kobe	Gangneung, South Korea
	Lee Sang-heon 6'; Mo Jae-hyeon 21' (yellow card) 67' (yellow-red card) 90+8'; Song Jun-seok 43'; Kim Kun-hee 90+5'; Seo Min-Woo (yellow card) 40'; Kim Kun-hee (yellow card) 88'	Report	Taisei Miyashiro 48', 89'; Jean Patric 50'	Stadium: Gangneung Stadium; Attendance: 4,158; Referee: Mooud Bonyadifard (Iran)

5 November 2025 MD 4	Vissel Kobe (Japan)	1–0	(South Korea) Ulsan HD FC	Kobe, Japan
	Jean Patrick 58'; Matheus Thuler (yellow card) 40'	Report	Back In-Woo (yellow card) 57'	Stadium: Noevir Stadium Kobe; Attendance: 7,117; Referee: Muhammad Taqi (Singapore)

26 November 2025 MD 5	Shanghai Shenhua (China)	0–2	(Japan) Vissel Kobe	Shanghai, China
	André Luís (penalty missed) 82; Shinichi Chan (yellow card) 56'; João Teixeira (yellow card) 63'; Saulo Mineiro (yellow card) 77'	Report	Yosuke Ideguchi 31'; Tetsushi Yamakawa 39'; Yuki Honda (yellow card) 3'; Yuya Kuwasaki (yellow card) 10'; Tetsushi Yamakawa (yellow card) 47'	Stadium: Shanghai Stadium; Attendance: 12,487; Referee: Kim Jong-Hyeok (South Korea)

9 December 2025 MD 6	Vissel Kobe (Japan)	2–2	(China) Chengdu Rongcheng	Kobe, Japan
	Yoshinori Muto 18'; Daiju Sasaki 90' (pen.); Haruya Ide (yellow card) 63'; Yuya Kuwasaki (yellow card) 69'	Report	Felipe 45+1', 77' (pen.); Dong Yanfeng (yellow card) 3'; Tim Chow (yellow card) 66'	Stadium: Noevir Stadium Kobe; Attendance: 8,718; Referee: Khaled Al-Hoish (Saudi Arabia)

10 February 2026 MD 7	Vissel Kobe (Japan)	2–0	(South Korea) FC Seoul	Kobe, Japan
	Yoshinori Muto 69'; Gōtoku Sakai 73'; Yuta Goke (yellow card) 43'; Daiju Sasaki (yellow card) 45+6'; Yuya Kuwasaki (yellow card) 57'	Report		Stadium: Noevir Stadium Kobe; Attendance: 7,159; Referee: Nazmi Nasaruddin (Malaysia)

17 February 2026 MD 8	Johor Darul Ta'zim (Malaysia)	1–0	(Japan) Vissel Kobe	Johor, Malaysia
	Marcos Guilherme 73'	Report	Kaito Yamada (yellow card) 6'	Stadium: Sultan Ibrahim Stadium; Attendance: 31,673; Referee: Ilgiz Tantashev (Uzbekistan)

Pos	Team	Pld	W	D	L	GF	GA	GD	Pts	Qualification
1	(Japan) Machida Zelvia	8	5	2	1	15	7	+8	17	Advance to round of 16
2	(Japan) Vissel Kobe	8	5	1	2	14	7	+7	16	Advance to round of 16
3	(Japan) Sanfrecce Hiroshima	8	4	3	1	10	6	+4	15	Advance to round of 16
4	(Thailand) Buriram United	8	4	2	2	10	8	+2	14	Advance to round of 16
5	(Australia) Melbourne City	8	4	2	2	9	7	+2	14	Advance to round of 16

Source: AFC
Rules for classification: 1) points; 2) goal difference; 3) number of goals scored; 4) number of matches won; 5) penalty shoot-out if only two teams remain tied and played each other on the final matchday 6) fair play ranking; 7) drawing of lots

==== Knockout stage ====
4 March 2026 Round of 16 first leg	FC Seoul (South Korea)	0–1	(Japan) Vissel Kobe	Seoul, South Korea
	Patryk Klimala (yellow card) 11'; Hrvoje Babec (yellow card) 49'; Leonardo Ruiz (penalty missed) 66	Report	Matheus Thuler 23'; Katsuya Nagato (yellow card) 28'; Yuta Goke (yellow card) 59'; Daiju Sasaki (yellow card) 83'	Stadium: Seoul World Cup Stadium; Attendance: 6,508; Referee: Khaled Al-Hoish (Saudi Arabia)

11 March 2025 Round of 16 second leg	Vissel Kobe (Japan)	2–1 (3–1 agg.)	(South Korea) FC Seoul	Kobe, Japan
	Yuya Osako 78'; Yosuke Ideguchi 89'; Matheus Thuler (yellow card) 23'	Report	Patryk Klimala 20'	Stadium: Noevir Stadium Kobe; Attendance: 14,750; Referee: Alireza Faghani (Australia)

16 April 2026 Quarter-final	Al Sadd (Qatar)	3–3 (a.e.t.) (4–5 p)	(Japan) Vissel Kobe	Jeddah, Saudi Arabia
	Rafa Mújica 6', 61'; Roberto Firmino 66'	Report	Yuya Osako 24'; Yosuke Ideguchi 75'; Yoshinori Muto 90+4'; Shuichi Gonda (yellow card) 109'	Stadium: King Abdullah Sports City Stadium; Attendance: 1,212; Referee: Omar Al-Ali (United Arab Emirates)
	Penalties
	Roberto Firmino (penalty scored); Agustín Soria (penalty scored); Claudinho (penalty missed); Boualem Khoukhi (penalty scored); Akram Afif (penalty scored)		Yuya Osako (penalty scored); Yoshinori Muto (penalty scored); Mitsuki Hidaka (penalty scored); Katsuya Nagato (penalty scored); Jean Patric (penalty scored)

21 April 2026 Semi-final	Vissel Kobe (Japan)	1–2	(Saudi Arabia) Al-Ahli	Jeddah, Saudi Arabia
	Yoshinori Muto 31'; Yuya Osako (yellow card) 38'; Yuta Goke (yellow card) 45'; Matheus Thuler (yellow card) 73'	Report	Galeno 62'; Ivan Toney 71'; Rayan Hamed (yellow card) 84'	Stadium: King Abdullah Sports City Stadium; Attendance: 44,716; Referee: Ilgiz Tantashev (Uzbekistan)

== Team statistics ==
=== Appearances and goals ===
As of 6 June 2026

No.	Pos.	Player	J1 League		2025–26 AFC Champions League Elite		Total	
No.	Pos.	Player	Apps	Goals	Apps	Goals	Apps	Goals
1	GK	(Japan) Daiya Maekawa	13	0	4	0	17	0
2	DF	(Japan) Nanasei Iino	2+1	0	0+1	0	4	0
3	DF	(Brazil) Matheus Thuler	16+1	2	5	1	22	3
4	DF	(Japan) Tetsushi Yamakawa	11+1	0	4+1	0	17	0
5	MF	(Japan) Yuta Goke	13+4	1	6	0	23	1
6	MF	(Japan) Takahiro Ogihara	8	3	2	0	10	3
7	MF	(Japan) Yosuke Ideguchi	19	1	5	2	24	3
10	FW	(Japan) Yuya Osako	10+5	4	2+2	2	19	6
11	FW	(Japan) Yoshinori Muto	14+1	4	5	3	20	7
13	MF	(Japan) Daiju Sasaki	13+1	2	5	0	19	2
14	MF	(Japan) Takashi Inui	2+4	0	0	0	6	0
15	DF	(Brazil) Diego	10+4	1	1+1	0	16	1
16	DF	(Brazil) Caetano	12+4	0	2+1	0	19	0
18	MF	(Japan) Haruya Ide	0+2	0	0	0	2	0
19	FW	(Japan) Makoto Mitsuta	4+3	0	1+1	0	9	0
21	GK	(Japan) Shota Arai	0	0	0	0	0	0
23	DF	(Japan) Rikuto Hirose	11+5	0	3+2	0	21	0
24	DF	(Japan) (United States) Gōtoku Sakai	13+1	2	3	1	17	3
25	MF	(Japan) Yuya Kuwasaki	7+2	0	0+2	0	11	0
26	FW	(Brazil) Jean Patric	0+14	1	1+3	0	18	1
28	MF	(Japan) Kento Hamasaki	0+9	0	2+4	0	15	0
29	FW	(Japan) Ren Komatsu	9+7	5	2+2	0	20	5
30	MF	(Japan) Kakeru Yamauchi	0+1	0	1	0	2	0
31	DF	(Japan) Takuya Iwanami	0	0	1	0	1	0
33	MF	(Japan) Rikuto Hashimoto	0+1	0	0	0	1	0
35	FW	(Japan) Niina Tominaga	0	0	1+1	0	2	0
38	MF	(Japan) Juzo Ura	0	0	0	0	0	0
40	FW	(Japan) Kotaro Uchino	0+3	0	0	0	3	0
41	DF	(Japan) Katsuya Nagato	17+2	3	4+1	0	24	3
42	DF	(Japan) (United States) Justin Homma	0	0	0	0	0	0
43	MF	(Japan) Kaito Yamada	2+5	0	1+1	0	9	0
44	MF	(Japan) Mitsuki Hidaka	2+9	1	1+2	0	14	1
51	MF	(Japan) Taiga Seguchi	0	0	0	0	0	0
57	MF	(Japan) Ryosuke Irie	0	0	0	0	0	0
71	GK	(Japan) Shūichi Gonda	7+1	0	2	0	10	0
80	DF	(Japan) (Nigeria) Boniface Nduka	5+3	1	2	0	10	1
Players featured on a match for the team, but left the club mid-season, either permanently or on loan transfer
