= 2025 Vissel Kobe season =

Vissel Kobe
2025 season
- Chairman: Yuki Chifu
- Manager: Takayuki Yoshida
- Stadium: Noevir Stadium Kobe; Hyōgo-ku, Kōbe, Hyōgo
- J1 League: 4th
- Emperor's Cup: Semi-final
- J.League Cup: Prime round
- Japanese Super Cup: Runners-up
- 2024–25 AFC Champions League Elite: Round of 16
- 2025–26 AFC Champions League Elite: League stage
- Top goalscorer: League: Taisei Miyashiro (11 goals); All: Taisei Miyashiro (13 goals)
- Average home league attendance: 21,099
Home colours	Away colours

The 2025 Vissel Kobe season is their 59th season in existence and the 9th consecutive season in the J1 League, since the club earned promotion back to it on 2013. In addition to the domestic league, in which they are the defending champions, Vissel Kobe are participating in this season's editions of the Japanese Super Cup, Emperor's Cup, the J.League Cup, AFC Champions League Elite and the AFC Champions League Elite.

== Squad ==
=== Season squad ===
Squad no.	Name	Nationality	Date of birth	Last Club
Goalkeepers
1	Daiya Maekawa	(Japan)	9 August 1994 (age 31)	(Japan) Kansai University
21	Shota Arai	(Japan)	1 November 1988 (age 37)	(Japan) JEF United Chiba
32	Richard Monday Ubong	(Japan) (Nigeria)	1 October 2005 (age 20)	(Japan) Fukuchiyama Seibi High School
50	Powell Obinna Obi	(Japan) (Nigeria)	18 December 1997 (age 28)	(Japan) Yokohama F. Marinos
71	Shūichi Gonda	(Japan)	3 March 1989 (age 37)	(Hungary) Debreceni
Defenders
3	Matheus Thuler	(Brazil)	10 March 1999 (age 27)	(France) Montpellier HSC
4	Tetsushi Yamakawa	(Japan)	1 October 1997 (age 28)	(Japan) University of Tsukuba
15	Yuki Honda	(Japan)	2 January 1991 (age 35)	(Japan) Kyoto Sanga FC
16	Caetano	(Brazil)	24 June 1999 (age 26)	(Brazil) Corinthians
20	Yuta Koike	(Japan)	6 November 1996 (age 29)	(Japan) Yokohama F. Marinos
23	Rikuto Hirose	(Japan)	23 September 1995 (age 30)	(Japan) Kashima Antlers
24	Gōtoku Sakai	(Japan) (United States)	14 March 1991 (age 35)	(Germany) Hamburger SV
31	Takuya Iwanami	(Japan)	18 June 1994 (age 31)	(Japan) Urawa Red Diamonds
41	Katsuya Nagato	(Japan)	15 January 1995 (age 31)	(Japan) Yokohama F. Marinos
66	Riku Matsuda	(Japan) (Indonesia)	24 July 1991 (age 34)	(Japan) Gamba Osaka
	Ryosuke Irie	(Japan)	5 November 2004 (age 21)	(Japan) Juntendo University
Midfielders
2	Nanasei Iino	(Japan)	2 October 1996 (age 29)	(Japan) Sagan Tosu
6	Takahiro Ogihara	(Japan)	5 October 1991 (age 34)	(Japan) Yokohama F. Marinos
7	Yosuke Ideguchi	(Japan)	23 August 1996 (age 29)	(Japan) Avispa Fukuoka
14	Koya Yuruki	(Japan)	3 July 1995 (age 30)	(Japan) Urawa Red Diamonds
18	Haruya Ide	(Japan)	25 March 1994 (age 32)	(Japan) Tokyo Verdy
22	Daiju Sasaki	(Japan)	17 September 1999 (age 26)	(Brazil) Palmeiras
25	Yuya Kuwasaki	(Japan)	15 May 1998 (age 27)	(Japan) V-Varen Nagasaki
30	Kakeru Yamauchi	(Japan)	6 January 2002 (age 24)	(Japan) University of Tsukuba
44	Mitsuki Hidaka	(Japan)	11 May 2003 (age 22)	(Spain) CD Atlético Paso
52	Kento Hamasaki	(Japan)	16 June 2007 (age 18)	Youth Team
77	Gustavo Klismahn	(Brazil)	23 November 1999 (age 26)	(Portugal) Santa Clara
	Sota Onishi	(Japan)	12 April 2007 (age 19)	Youth Team
	Taiga Seguchi	(Japan)	10 January 2008 (age 18)	Youth Team
Forwards
9	Taisei Miyashiro	(Japan)	26 May 2000 (age 25)	(Japan) Kawasaki Frontale
10	Yuya Osako	(Japan)	18 May 1990 (age 35)	(Germany) Werder Bremen
11	Yoshinori Muto	(Japan)	15 July 1992 (age 33)	(Spain) SD Eibar
26	Jean Patric	(Brazil)	14 July 1997 (age 28)	(Japan) Cerezo Osaka
27	Erik	(Brazil)	18 July 1994 (age 31)	(Japan) Machida Zelvia
29	Ren Komatsu	(Japan)	10 September 1998 (age 27)	(Japan) Blaublitz Akita
55	Yuta Miyahara	(Japan)	7 April 2005 (age 21)	(Poland) Górnik Zabrze B
	Hayato Watanabe	(Japan)	6 April 2007 (age 19)	Youth Team
Players left on loan during mid-season
5	Mitsuki Saito	(Japan)	10 January 1999 (age 27)	(Japan) Gamba Osaka
17	Tatsunori Sakurai (M)	(Japan)	26 July 2002 (age 23)	(Japan) Mito HollyHock
22	Haruka Motoyama (D)	(Japan)	5 June 1999 (age 26)	(Japan) Fagiano Okayama
28	Yuya Tsuboi (G)	(Japan)	23 August 1999 (age 26)	(Japan) Omiya Ardija
33	Rikuto Hashimoto (M)	(Japan)	2 April 2005 (age 21)	(Japan) Tokyo Verdy
34	Yusei Ozaki (D)	(Japan)	26 July 2003 (age 22)	(Japan) Ehime FC
36	Shuto Adachi (F)	(Japan)	15 July 2004 (age 21)	(Japan) Iwate Grulla Morioka
37	Shogo Terasaka (D)	(Japan)	6 June 2004 (age 21)	(Japan) FC Gifu
38	Juzo Ura (M)	(Japan)	21 May 2004 (age 21)	(Japan) Ehime FC
39	Shioki Takayama (G)	(Japan)	13 June 2001 (age 24)	(Japan) FC Ryukyu
Players who left club during / mid-season
88	Ryota Morioka	(Japan)	12 April 1991 (age 35)	(Japan) Cerezo Osaka

Last updated: 17 January 2024.
Source: Vissel Kobe website

== Friendly ==
=== Mid-season ===
Win Draw Loss

27 July 2025 Barcelona World Tour	Vissel Kobe (Japan)	1–3	(Spain) Barcelona	Kobe, Japan
19:00 JST (UTC+9)	Miyashiro 43'	Report	E. García 33'; Bardghji 78'; Dro 88'	Stadium: Noevir Stadium Kobe; Attendance: 14,950

== Transfers ==
=== Pre-season ===
==== In ====
Transfers in

Date	Position	Player	Transferred from	Ref
Permanent Transfer
15 December 2024	GK	(Japan) Yuya Tsuboi	(Japan) Júbilo Iwata	End of loan (Note: Yuya Tsuboi moves to Omiya Ardija after his loan ended with Júbilo Iwata.)
15 December 2024	DF	(Japan) (United States) Justin Homma	(Japan) Vissel Kobe	End of loan
15 December 2024	DF	(Japan) Shogo Terasaka	(Japan) FC Gifu	End of loan (Note: Shogo Terasaka's loan to FC Gifu extended for another season.)
15 December 2024	DF	(Japan) Yusei Ozaki	(Japan) Ehime FC	End of loan (Note: Yusei Ozak moves to Blaublitz Akita after his loan ended with Ehime FC.)
15 December 2024	MF	(Japan) Juzo Ura	(Japan) Ehime FC	End of loan (Note: Juzo Ura moves to Kataller Toyama after his loan ended with Ehime FC.)
15 December 2024	MF	(Japan) Tatsunori Sakurai	(Japan) Mito HollyHock	End of loan (Note: Tatsunori Sakurai moves to Sagan Tosu after his loan ended with Mito HollyHock.)
15 December 2024	MF	(Japan) Toya Izumi	(Japan) Omiya Ardija	End of loan
15 December 2024	MF	(Japan) Shuto Adachi	(Japan) Iwate Grulla Morioka	End of loan
13 December 2024	GK	(Japan) (Nigeria) Richard Monday Ubong	(Japan) Fukuchiyama Seibi High School	Free
5 January 2025	DF	(Japan) Haruka Motoyama	(Japan) Fagiano Okayama	Free
6 January 2025	DF	(Japan) (Indonesia) Riku Matsuda	(Japan) Gamba Osaka	Free
6 January 2025	MF	(Japan) Rikuto Hashimoto	(Japan) Tokyo Verdy	Free
7 January 2025	DF	(Brazil) Caetano	(Brazil) Corinthians	Undisclosed
10 January 2025	DF	(Japan) Yuta Koike	(Japan) Yokohama F. Marinos	Free
Loan Transfer
3 March 2025	MF	(Brazil) Gustavo Klismahn	(Portugal) Santa Clara	Season loan
5 March 2025	FW	(Brazil) Erik	(Japan) Machida Zelvia	Season loan

==== Out ====
Transfers out

Date	Position	Player	Transferred from	Ref
Permanent Transfer
13 December 2024	MF	(Japan) Yuya Nakasaka	(Japan) Basara Hyogo (J5)	Free
23 December 2024	MF	(Japan) Hotaru Yamaguchi	(Japan) V-Varen Nagasaki	Free
27 December 2024	MF	(Japan) Toya Izumi	(Japan) Omiya Ardija	Undisclosed
31 December 2024	MF	(Japan) Ryota Morioka	Retired	N.A.
4 January 2025	MF	(Japan) Ryuho Kikuchi	(Japan) FC Machida Zelvia	Free
6 February 2025	MF	(Japan) Ryo Hatsuse	(England) Sheffield Wednesday	Free
LoanTransfer
22 December 2024	DF	(Japan) Yusei Ozaki	(Japan) Blaublitz Akita	Season loan
23 December 2024	MF	(Japan) Tatsunori Sakurai	(Japan) Sagan Tosu	Season loan
24 December 2024	MF	(Japan) Juzo Ura	(Japan) Kataller Toyama	Season loan
25 December 2024	MF	(Japan) Shuto Adachi	(Japan) Thespa Gunma	Season loan
27 December 2024	DF	(Japan) Shogo Terasaka	(Japan) FC Gifu	Season loan
28 December 2024	GK	(Japan) Yuya Tsuboi	(Japan) Omiya Ardija	Season loan
28 December 2024	GK	(Japan) Shioki Takayama	(Japan) FC Ryukyu	Season loan
28 December 2024	DF	(Japan) (United States) Justin Homma	(Japan) Matsumoto Yamaga FC	Season loan
17 January 2025	DF	(Japan) Kaito Yamada	(United States) Tacoma Defiance	Season loan

=== Mid-season ===
==== In ====
Transfers in

Date	Position	Player	Transferred from	Ref
Permanent Transfer
9 June 2025	DF	(Japan) Katsuya Nagato	(Japan) Yokohama F. Marinos	Undisclosed
4 July 2025	FW	(Japan) Ren Komatsu	(Japan) Blaublitz Akita	Undisclosed
25 July 2025	FW	(Japan) Ryosuke Irie	(Japan) Juntendo University	Free
27 July 2025	FW	(Japan) Yuta Miyahara	(Poland) Górnik Zabrze B	Free
20 September 2025	GK	(Japan) Shūichi Gonda	(Hungary) Debreceni	Free
Loan Transfer

==== Out ====
Transfers out

Date	Position	Player	Transferred from	Ref
Permanent Transfer
Loan Transfer
10 June 2025	DF	(Japan) Haruka Motoyama	(Japan) Fagiano Okayama	Season loan
22 July 2025	MF	(Japan) Mitsuki Saito	(Japan) Kyoto Sanga FC	Season loan
30 July 2025	MF	(Japan) Rikuto Hashimoto	(Japan) Roasso Kumamoto	Season loan

== Competitions ==
=== J1 League ===
Pos	Team	Pld	W	D	L	GF	GA	GD	Pts	Qualification or relegation
3	Kyoto Sanga	38	19	11	8	62	40	+22	68	Qualification for the AFC Champions League Elite league stage
4	Sanfrecce Hiroshima	38	20	8	10	46	28	+18	68	
5	Vissel Kobe	38	18	10	10	46	33	+13	64	
6	Machida Zelvia	38	17	9	12	52	38	+14	60	Qualification for the AFC Champions League Two group stage
7	Urawa Red Diamonds	38	16	11	11	45	39	+6	59	

Source: JLeague.co, JLeague.jp, J.League Data Site
Rules for classification: 1) Points; 2) Goal difference; 3) Goals scored; 4) Head-to-head points; 5) Head-to-head goal difference; 6) Head-to-head goals scored; 7) Fewer disciplinary points.

==== Matches ====
15 February 1	Vissel Kobe	0–0	Urawa Red Diamonds	Kobe
		Report	Takuro Kaneko (yellow card) 56'; Matheus Sávio (yellow card) 76'	Stadium: Noevir Stadium Kobe; Attendance: 22,266; Referee: Yusuke Araki

22 February 2	Nagoya Grampus	2–2	Vissel Kobe	Aichi
	Shuhei Tokumoto 56'; Sho Inagaki 86' (pen.); Daiki Miya (yellow card) 66'	Report	Yuya Osako 70', 75'	Stadium: Toyota Stadium; Attendance: 31,088; Referee: Hiroyuki Kimura

26 February 3	Vissel Kobe	1–1	Kyoto Sanga	Kobe
	Daiju Sasaki 90+11'; Takuya Iwanami (yellow card) 82'	Report	Marco Túlio 13'; Patrick (yellow card) 7'	Stadium: Noevir Stadium Kobe; Attendance: 11,335; Referee: Koei Koya

1 March 4	Vissel Kobe	0–1	Avispa Fukuoka	Kobe
		Report	Tetsushi Yamakawa 40' (o.g.); Takumi Kamijima (yellow card) 53'	Stadium: Noevir Stadium Kobe; Attendance: 20,890; Referee: Masuya Ueda

16 March 6	Shonan Bellmare	1–2	Vissel Kobe	Hiratsuka
	Lukian 51'	Report	Erik 24', 37'; Kakeru Yamauchi (yellow card) 90+4'	Stadium: Lemon Gas Stadium Hiratsuka; Attendance: 9,537; Referee: Ryo Tanimoto

29 March 7	Kashima Antlers	1–0	Vissel Kobe	Tokyo
	Léo Ceará 33'; Tomoki Hayakawa (yellow card) 73'; Yuma Suzuki (yellow card) 86'	Report	Takahiro Ogihara (yellow card) 27'; Erik (yellow card) 41'; Koya Yuruki (yellow card) 90+3'; Matheus Thuler (yellow card) 90+4'	Stadium: Japan National Stadium; Attendance: 22,601; Referee: Yudai Yamamoto

2 April 8	Yokohama FC	0–1	Vissel Kobe	Yokohama
	Yoshiaki Komai (yellow card) 64'	Report	Erik 74'	Stadium: Mitsuzawa Stadium; Attendance: 8,032; Referee: Kôichirô Fukushima

6 April 9	Vissel Kobe	0–1	Albirex Niigata	Kobe
		Report	Motoki Hasegawa 13'	Stadium: Noevir Stadium Kobe; Attendance: 36,407; Referee: Akihiko Ikeuchi

12 April 10	Tokyo Verdy	0–1	Vissel Kobe	Chōfu
	Yuto Tsunashima (yellow card) 49' (yellow-red card) 86'	Report	Koya Yuruki 51'; Yuya Kuwasaki (yellow card) 13'	Stadium: Ajinomoto Stadium; Attendance: 17,474; Referee: Futoshi Nakamura

16 April 11	Vissel Kobe	2–1	Kawasaki Frontale	Kobe
	Daiju Sasaki 31'; Matheus Thuler 45'	Report	Marcinho 45+3' (yellow card) 12'; Erison (yellow card) 45+2'	Stadium: Noevir Stadium Kobe; Attendance: 11,019; Referee: Masuya Ueda

20 April 12	Vissel Kobe	1–0	Machida Zelvia	Kobe
	Daihachi Okamura 62' (o.g.)	Report	Ibrahim Drešević (yellow card) 37'; Na Sangho (yellow card) 90'	Stadium: Noevir Stadium Kobe; Attendance: 21,920; Referee: Hiroki Kasahara

3 May 13	Vissel Kobe	2–0	Fagiano Okayama	Kobe
	Taisei Miyashiro 51'; Yosuke Ideguchi 73'	Report		Stadium: Noevir Stadium Kobe; Attendance: 25,596; Referee: Kôichirô Fukushima

6 May 14	Vissel Kobe	1–3	Cerezo Osaka	Kobe
	Taisei Miyashiro 45'	Report	Satoki Uejō 45+2'; Masaya Shibayama 83'; Rafael Ratão 90+6' (yellow card) 90+6'; Kakeru Funaki (yellow card) 29'; Hayato Okuda (yellow card) 56'; Koki Fukui (yellow card) 89'	Stadium: Noevir Stadium Kobe; Attendance: 24,891; Referee: Jumpei Ilda

10 May 15	FC Tokyo	1–0	Vissel Kobe	Chōfu
	Marcelo Ryan 90+13' (yellow card) 90+6'; Henrique Trevisan (yellow card) 7'	Report	Gōtoku Sakai (yellow card) 37'; Yuki Honda (yellow card) 90+12'; Matheus Thuler (yellow card) 90+15'	Stadium: Ajinomoto Stadium; Attendance: 24,837; Referee: Takuto Okabe

17 May 16	Vissel Kobe	3–2	Gamba Osaka	Kobe
	Yuya Osako 50', 90+6'; Matheus Thuler 59' (yellow card) 17'	Report	Shu Kurata 56'; Keisuke Kurokawa 73'	Stadium: Noevir Stadium Kobe; Attendance: 23,275; Referee: Ryo Tanimoto

21 May 17	Yokohama F. Marinos	1–2	Vissel Kobe	Yokohama
	Takuya Kida 43' (yellow card) 68'	Report	Erik 19'; Yuya Osako 51'	Stadium: Nissan Stadium; Attendance: 15,373; Referee: Futoshi Nakamura

25 May 18	Shimizu S-Pulse	3–2	Vissel Kobe	Shizuoka
	Koya Kitagawa 15'; Sen Takagi 24', 72'; Zento Uno (yellow card) 41'	Report	Taisei Miyashiro 57', 90+1'; Yuki Honda (yellow card) 65'; Jean Patric (yellow card) 88'	Stadium: IAI Stadium Nihondaira; Attendance: 17,528; Referee: Hayato Shimizu

31 May 19	Kashiwa Reysol	1–3	Vissel Kobe	Chiba
	Wataru Harada 26'; Hayato Tanaka (yellow card) 67'	Report	Matheus Thuler 19'; Takahiro Ogihara 40' (yellow card) 29'; Daiju Sasaki 90+7'; Tetsushi Yamakawa (yellow card) 70'; Haruya Ide (yellow card) 89'	Stadium: Sankyo Frontier Kashiwa Stadium; Attendance: 12,989; Referee: Yusuke Araki

15 June 20	Vissel Kobe	2–1	Nagoya Grampus	Kobe
	Takuya Uchida 44' (o.g.); Taisei Miyashiro 45+2'; Yota Sato (yellow card) 2'; Teruki Hera (yellow card) 36'	Report	Teruki Hera 57'; Takahiro Ohgihara (yellow card) 82'	Stadium: Noevir Stadium Kobe; Attendance: 22,175; Referee: Robert Jones (England)

21 June 21	Kawasaki Frontale	1–2	Vissel Kobe	Kawasaki
	Yasuto Wakizaka 6'; Kota Takai (yellow card) 75'	Report	Taisei Miyashiro 10', 52'; Gōtoku Sakai (yellow card) 47'; Gustavo Klismahn (yellow card) 88'	Stadium: Kawasaki Todoroki Stadium; Attendance: 23,103; Referee: Łukasz Kuźma (Poland)

28 June 22	Avispa Fukuoka	0–0	Vissel Kobe	Fukuoka
	Masaya Tashiro (yellow card) 71'	Report		Stadium: Best Denki Stadium; Attendance: 11,783; Referee: Yusuke Araki

2 July 5 (Rescheduled)	Vissel Kobe	1–0	Sanfrecce Hiroshima	Kobe
	Erik 66'	Report	Yotaro Nakajima (yellow card) 21'	Stadium: Noevir Stadium Kobe; Attendance: 14,950; Referee: Koei Koya

5 July 23	Vissel Kobe	4–0	Shonan Bellmare	Kobe
	Takahiro Ogihara 14'; Taisei Miyashiro 48'; Daiju Sasaki 77'; Koya Yuruki 90+4'	Report	Yutaro Oda (yellow card) 71'	Stadium: Noevir Stadium Kobe; Attendance: 20,941; Referee: Jumpei Iida

20 July 24	Fagiano Okayama	1–2	Vissel Kobe	Okayama
	Ataru Esaka 90+4'; Yūta Kamiya (yellow card) 23'	Report	Erik 30'; Taisei Miyashiro 64'	Stadium: City Light Stadium; Attendance: 15,153; Referee: Akihiko Ikeuchi

10 August 25	Machida Zelvia	2–0	Vissel Kobe	Tokyo
	Yuta Nakayama 6'; Yūki Sōma 35'; Daihachi Okamura (yellow card) 65'	Report		Stadium: Japan National Stadium; Attendance: 12,619; Referee: Hiroyuki Kimura

16 August 26	Vissel Kobe	0–1	Yokohama FC	Kobe
	Haruya Ide (yellow card) 14'	Report	Sho Ito 90+4'; Hinata Ogura (yellow card) 44'; Solomon Sakuragawa (yellow card) 90+9'; Fumitake Miura (yellow card) 90+10'	Stadium: Noevir Stadium Kobe; Attendance: 23,166; Referee: Akihiko Ikeuchi

20 August 30	Sanfrecce Hiroshima	0–1	Vissel Kobe	Hiroshima
	Sho Sasaki (red card) 57'	Report	Kim Ju-sung 87' (o.g.)	Stadium: Edion Peace Wing Hiroshima; Attendance: 24,847; Referee: Yusuke Araki

23 August 27	Cerezo Osaka	1–1	Vissel Kobe	Osaka
	Shinji Kagawa 35'; Shinnosuke Hatanaka (yellow card) 42'	Report	Erik 48' (yellow card) 90+2'; Yosuke Ideguchi (yellow card) 22'; Takahiro Ogihara (yellow card) 28'	Stadium: Yodoko Sakura Stadium; Attendance: 21,578; Referee: Futoshi Nakamura

30 August 28	Vissel Kobe	1–0	Yokohama F. Marinos	Kobe
	Yoshinori Muto 37'; Erik (yellow card) 33'	Report	Ryo Miyaichi (yellow card) 22'; Takuya Kida (yellow card) 65'; Toichi Suzuki (yellow card) 72'	Stadium: Noevir Stadium Kobe; Attendance: 23,198; Referee: Yudai Yamamoto

12 September 29 (Rescheduled)	Vissel Kobe	0–0	Kashiwa Reysol	Kobe
	Yosuke Ideguchi (yellow card) 85'	Report		Stadium: Noevir Stadium Kobe; Attendance: 15,051; Referee: Jumpei Iida

23 September 31	Vissel Kobe	4–0	Tokyo Verdy	Kobe
	Yuya Osako 10'; Taisei Miyashiro 38', 67'; Erik 55'; Yuya Kuwasaki (yellow card) 28'	Report	Hiroto Taniguchi (yellow card) 31'; Yosuke Uchida (yellow card) 51'; Yuya Fukuda (yellow card) 63'	Stadium: Noevir Stadium Kobe; Attendance: 17,132; Referee: Hiroyuki Kimura

27 September 32	Vissel Kobe	2–1	Shimizu S-Pulse	Kobe
	Yuya Kuwasaki 65'; Gōtoku Sakai 90+1'; Matheus Thuler (yellow card) 37'	Report	Kazuki Kozuka 40'; Matheus Bueno (yellow card) 46'	Stadium: Noevir Stadium Kobe; Attendance: 18,914; Referee: Faisal Sulaiman Albalawi (Saudi Arabia)

4 October 33	Urawa Red Diamonds	1–0	Vissel Kobe	Saitama
	Isaac Kiese Thelin 47'; Kaito Yasui (yellow card) 20'	Report		Stadium: Saitama Stadium 2002; Attendance: 38,062; Referee: Akihiko Ikeuchi

17 October 34	Vissel Kobe	0–0	Kashima Antlers	Kobe
		Report	Kim Tae Hyeon (yellow card) 70'; Kei Chinen (yellow card) 90+8'	Stadium: Noevir Stadium Kobe; Attendance: 25,806; Referee: Takafumi Mikuriya

26 October 35	Albirex Niigata	2–2	Vissel Kobe	Niigata
	Takuya Shimamura 73' (yellow card) 48'; Yamato Wakatsuki 90'; Soya Fujiwara (yellow card) 51'; Takahiro Ogihara (yellow card) 90+4'	Report	Yuya Osako 45+3', 52' (pen.)	Stadium: Denka Big Swan Stadium; Attendance: 19,480; Referee: Masuya Ueda

8 November 36	Gamba Osaka	1–1	Vissel Kobe	Osaka
	Kanji Okunuki 80'; Riku Handa (yellow card) 31'; Masaaki Higashiguchi (red card) 78'	Report	Daiju Sasaki 89'; Yuki Honda (yellow card) 55'	Stadium: Suita City Football Stadium; Attendance: 34,695; Referee: Akihiko Ikeuchi

30 November 37	Vissel Kobe	0–0	FC Tokyo	Kobe
	Matheus Thuler (yellow card) 76'	Report	Keita Endo (yellow card) 34'; Kein Sato (yellow card) 34'	Stadium: Noevir Stadium Kobe; Attendance: 21,948; Referee: Koichiro Fukushima

6 December 38	Kyoto Sanga	2–0	Vissel Kobe	Kyoto
	Marco Túlio 38'; Rafael Elias 77' (yellow card) 62'; Joao Pedro (yellow card) 89'	Report		Stadium: Sanga Stadium by Kyocera; Attendance: 20,074; Referee: Takafumi Mikuriya

=== Emperor's Cup ===
11 June Round 2	Vissel Kobe	4–1	Kochi United (J3)	Kobe
	10' (o.g.); Erik 50'; 64' (o.g.); Rikuto Hirose 84'; Takahiro Ogihara (yellow card) 79'	Report	Erik 50'; Ryota Ito (yellow card) 7'; Se-Gi Park (yellow card) 29'; Naoki Suto (yellow card) 33'; Daichi Kobayashi (yellow card) 87'	Stadium: Noevir Stadium Kobe; Attendance: 4,597; Referee: Akihiko Ikeuchi

16 July Round 3	Vissel Kobe	2–1 (a.e.t.)	Ventforet Kofu (J2)	Kobe
	Takuya Iwanami 90+3'; Erik 94'; Mitsuki Hidaka (yellow card) 115'	Report	Yamato Naito 58'; Matheus Leiria (yellow card) 48'; Yamato Naito (yellow card) 63' (yellow-red card) 68'; Renato Júnior (yellow card) 120'	Stadium: Noevir Stadium Kobe; Attendance: 4,608; Referee: Masuya Ueda

6 August Round 4	Vissel Kobe	2–1 (a.e.t.)	Toyo University (UL)	Kobe
	Haruya Ide 13'; Taisei Miyashiro 120+1'; Yuya Kuwasaki (yellow card) 108'	Report	Mahiro Yunomae 36'; Hinata Fukuhara (yellow card) 113'; Tariqkanai Hayato Okabe (yellow card) 120+3'	Stadium: Noevir Stadium Kobe; Attendance: 5,115; Referee: Koei Koya

27 August Quarter-final	SC Sagamihara (J3)	1–1 (a.e.t.) (2–4 p)	Vissel Kobe	Sagamihara
	Daisuke Kato 15'; Toshio Shimakawa (yellow card) 66'; Keisuke Ogasawara (yellow card) 75'; Ko Watahiki (yellow card) 95'	Report	Ren Komatsu 30'; Tetsushi Yamakawa (yellow card) 83'; Jean Patric (yellow card) 120'	Stadium: Sagamihara Gion Stadium; Attendance: 2,730; Referee: Takafumi Mikuriya
	Penalties
	Ryo Takano (penalty missed); Takumi Nishiyama (penalty scored); Takato Takeuchi (penalty scored)		Erik (penalty scored); Taisei Miyashiro (penalty scored); Takahiro Ogihara (penalty scored); Jean Patric (penalty scored)

18 November Semi-final	Vissel Kobe	2–0	Sanfrecce Hiroshima	Osaka
	Katsuya Nagato 24'; Daiju Sasaki 69' (pen.); Matheus Thuler (yellow card) 6'	Report		Stadium: Suita City Football Stadium; Attendance: 17,861; Referee: Koei Koya

22 November Final	FC Machida Zelvia	3–1	Vissel Kobe	Shinjuku
14:00	Shota Fujio 6', 56'; Yuki Soma 32'; Yūta Nakayama (yellow card) 48'; Ibrahim Drešević (yellow card) 37'	Report	Taisei Miyashiro 62'; Yoshinori Muto (yellow card) 42'; Tetsushi Yamakawa (yellow card) 72'; Kosei Tani (yellow card) 88'	Stadium: Japan National Stadium; Attendance: 31,414; Referee: Hiroyuki Kimura

=== J.League Cup ===
3 September Prime round QF Leg 1	Yokohama FC	2–0	Vissel Kobe	Yokohama
	João Paulo 50' (yellow card) 68'; Hinata Ogura 58' (yellow card) 63'; Koki Kumakura (yellow card) 88'	Report		Stadium: NHK Spring Mitsuzawa Football Stadium; Attendance: 4,034; Referee: Koei Koya

7 September Prime round QF Leg 2	Vissel Kobe	1–0 (1–2 agg.)	Yokohama FC	Kobe
	Yuya Osako 84'; Matheus Thuler (red card) 26'	Report	Lukian (yellow card) 36'; Hinata Ogura (yellow card) 63'; Towa Yamane (yellow card) 85'; Kaili Shimbo (yellow card) 90+3'	Stadium: Noevir Stadium Kobe; Attendance: 6,171; Referee: Masuya Ueda

=== Super Cup ===
8 February	Vissel Kobe	0–2	Sanfrecce Hiroshima	Japan National Stadium
13:35 JST	Tetsushi Yamakawa (yellow card) 58'; Mitsuki Saito (yellow card) 78'; Takuya Iwanami (yellow card) 87'	Report	Tolgay Arslan 12'; Hayato Araki 70'	Attendance: 53,343; Referee: Takafumi Mikuriya

=== AFC Champions League ===
Pos	Team	Pld	W	D	L	GF	GA	GD	Pts	Qualification
3	(Malaysia) Johor Darul Ta'zim	7	4	2	1	16	8	+8	14	Advance to round of 16
4	(South Korea) Gwangju	7	4	2	1	15	9	+6	14	Advance to round of 16
5	(Japan) Vissel Kobe	7	4	1	2	14	9	+5	13	Advance to round of 16
6	(Thailand) Buriram United	8	3	3	2	7	12	−5	12	Advance to round of 16
7	(China) Shanghai Shenhua	8	3	1	4	13	12	+1	10	Advance to round of 16

Source: Asian Football Confederation
Rules for classification: 1) points; 2) goal difference; 3) number of goals scored; 4) number of matches won; 5) penalty shoot-out if only two teams remain tied and played each other on the final matchday 6) fair play ranking; 7) drawing of lots

==== League phase ====
11 February 2025 Matchday 7	Vissel Kobe (Japan)	4–0	(China) Shanghai Port	Kobe, Japan
	Yoshinori Muto 11'; Yuya Kuwasaki 54'; Koya Yuruki 56'; Yuya Osako 81' (penalty missed) 78; Kakeru Yamauchi (yellow card) 87'	Report	Li Shuai (yellow card) 6'; Matheus Jussa (yellow card) 67'; Yang Shiyuan (yellow card) 90+6'	Stadium: Noevir Stadium Kobe; Attendance: 5,800; Referee: Abdulrahman Al-Jassim (Qatar)

18 February 2025 Matchday 8	Shanghai Shenhua (China)	4–2	(Japan) Vissel Kobe	Shanghai, China
	Saulo Mineiro 2', 48', 70' (pen.); Shinichi Chan 45+2'	Report	Niina Tominaga 87'; Haruya Ide 90+3'	Stadium: Shanghai Stadium; Attendance: 20,972; Referee: Majed Al-Shamrani (Saudi Arabia)

==== Knockout stage ====
5 March 2025 R16 Leg 1	Vissel Kobe (Japan)	2–0	(South Korea) Gwangju FC	Kobe, Japan
	Yuya Osako 20' (yellow card) 13'; Haruya Ide 29'	Report	Si-Woo Jin (yellow card) 79'	Stadium: Noevir Stadium Kobe; Attendance: 7,630; Referee: Adel Ali Ahmed Khamis Al-Naqbi (United Arab Emirates)

12 March 2025 R16 Leg 2	Gwangju FC (South Korea)	3–0 (a.e.t.) (3–2 agg.)	(Japan) Vissel Kobe	Yongin, South Korea
	Park Jeong-in 19'; Jasir Asani 85' (pen.), 118' (yellow card) 119'; Min Sang-gi (yellow card) 36'	Report	Yuya Kuwasaki (yellow card) 19'; Daiju Sasaki (yellow card) 27'; Takahiro Ogihara (yellow card) 59'; Yuya Osako (yellow card) 90+2'	Stadium: Gwangju Football Stadium; Referee: Abdulrahman Al-Jassim (Qatar)

=== AFC Champions League ===
==== League stage ====
Win Draw Loss

17 September 2025 MD 1	Shanghai Port (China)	0–3	(Japan) Vissel Kobe	Shanghai, China
	Zhang Linpeng (yellow card) 89'	Report	Erik 19'; Taisei Miyashiro 40'; Yuya Osako 44'	Stadium: Pudong Football Stadium; Attendance: 12,966; Referee: Choi Hyun-jai (South Korea)

1 October 2025 MD 2	Vissel Kobe (Japan)	1–0	(Australia) Melbourne City	Kobe, Japan
	Koya Yuruki 90+4'; Ren Komatsu (yellow card) 75'	Report	Nathaniel Atkinson (yellow card) 31'; Samuel Souprayen (yellow card) 61'; Besian Kutleshi (yellow card) 84'; Germán Ferreyra (yellow card) 90+3'	Stadium: Noevir Stadium Kobe; Attendance: 5,119; Referee: Rustam Lutfullin (Uzbekistan)

22 October 2025 MD 3	Gangwon FC (South Korea)	4–3	(Japan) Vissel Kobe	Gangneung, South Korea
	Lee Sang-heon 6'; Mo Jae-hyeon 21' (yellow card) 67' (yellow-red card) 90+8'; Song Jun-seok 43'; Kim Kun-hee 90+5'; Seo Min-Woo (yellow card) 40'; Kim Kun-hee (yellow card) 88'	Report	Taisei Miyashiro 48', 89'; Jean Patric 50'	Stadium: Gangneung Stadium; Attendance: 4,158; Referee: Mooud Bonyadifard (Iran)

5 November 2025 MD 4	Vissel Kobe (Japan)	1–0	(South Korea) Ulsan HD FC	Kobe, Japan
	Jean Patrick 58'; Matheus Thuler (yellow card) 40'	Report	Back In-Woo (yellow card) 57'	Stadium: Noevir Stadium Kobe; Attendance: 7,117; Referee: Muhammad Taqi (Singapore)

26 November 2025 MD 5	Shanghai Shenhua (China)	0–2	(Japan) Vissel Kobe	Shanghai, China
	André Luís (penalty missed) 82; Shinichi Chan (yellow card) 56'; João Teixeira (yellow card) 63'; Saulo Mineiro (yellow card) 77'	Report	Yosuke Ideguchi 31'; Tetsushi Yamakawa 39'; Yuki Honda (yellow card) 3'; Yuya Kuwasaki (yellow card) 10'; Tetsushi Yamakawa (yellow card) 47'	Stadium: Shanghai Stadium; Referee: Kim Jong-Hyeok (South Korea)

9 December 2025 MD 6	Vissel Kobe (Japan)	2–2	(China) Chengdu Rongcheng	Kobe, Japan
	Yoshinori Muto 18'; Daiju Sasaki 90' (pen.); Haruya Ide (yellow card) 63'; Yuya Kuwasaki (yellow card) 69'	Report	Felipe 45+1', 77' (pen.); Dong Yanfeng (yellow card) 3'; Tim Chow (yellow card) 66'	Stadium: Noevir Stadium Kobe; Attendance: 8,718; Referee: Khaled Al-Hoish (Saudi Arabia)

10 February 2026 MD 7	Vissel Kobe (Japan)	2–0	(South Korea) FC Seoul	Kobe, Japan
	Yoshinori Muto 69'; Gōtoku Sakai 73'; Yuta Goke (yellow card) 43'; Daiju Sasaki (yellow card) 45+6'; Yuya Kuwasaki (yellow card) 57'	Report		Stadium: Noevir Stadium Kobe; Attendance: 7,159; Referee: Nazmi Nasaruddin (Malaysia)

17 February 2026 MD 8	Johor Darul Ta'zim (Malaysia)	–	(Japan) Vissel Kobe	Johor, Malaysia
		Report		Stadium: Sultan Ibrahim Stadium

Pos	Team	Pld	W	D	L	GF	GA	GD	Pts	Qualification
1	(Japan) Machida Zelvia	8	5	2	1	15	7	+8	17	Advance to round of 16
2	(Japan) Vissel Kobe	8	5	1	2	14	7	+7	16	Advance to round of 16
3	(Japan) Sanfrecce Hiroshima	8	4	3	1	10	6	+4	15	Advance to round of 16
4	(Thailand) Buriram United	8	4	2	2	10	8	+2	14	Advance to round of 16
5	(Australia) Melbourne City	8	4	2	2	9	7	+2	14	Advance to round of 16

Source: AFC
Rules for classification: 1) points; 2) goal difference; 3) number of goals scored; 4) number of matches won; 5) penalty shoot-out if only two teams remain tied and played each other on the final matchday 6) fair play ranking; 7) drawing of lots

== Team statistics ==
=== Appearances and goals ===
As of 9 Dec 2025

No.	Pos.	Player	J1 League		Emperor's Cup		J.League Cup		Super Cup		2024–25 AFC Champions League Elite		2025–26 AFC Champions League Elite		Total	
No.	Pos.	Player	Apps	Goals	Apps	Goals	Apps	Goals	Apps	Goals	Apps	Goals	Apps	Goals	Apps	Goals
1	GK	(Japan) Daiya Maekawa	37	0	2	0	2	0	0	0	3	0	2	0	45	0
2	DF	(Japan) Nanasei Iino	7+14	0	3+1	0	0+1	0	1	0	1+2	0	3	0	33	0
3	DF	(Brazil) Matheus Thuler	29+2	3	2	0	1	0	0	0	3	0	3	0	40	3
4	DF	(Japan) Tetsushi Yamakawa	37	0	3+3	0	1+2	0	1	0	3	0	4	1	54	1
6	MF	(Japan) Takahiro Ogihara	31+4	2	2+3	0	0+1	0	0	0	3	0	2+2	0	48	2
7	MF	(Japan) Yosuke Ideguchi	29+1	1	2+1	0	1+1	0	0	0	0+1	0	4	1	40	2
9	FW	(Japan) Taisei Miyashiro	32+1	11	2+3	2	1+1	0	0	0	1	0	2+4	3	47	16
10	FW	(Japan) Yuya Osako	21+9	8	0+2	0	1	1	0+1	0	3	2	3+1	1	41	12
11	FW	(Japan) Yoshinori Muto	11+7	1	2	0	1	0	0+1	0	1+1	1	1+2	1	27	3
13	MF	(Japan) Daiju Sasaki	26+5	5	3+2	1	0	0	1	0	2	0	3+1	1	43	7
14	MF	(Japan) Koya Yuruki	11+13	2	4	0	1	0	0+1	0	1	1	3+1	1	35	4
15	DF	(Japan) Yuki Honda	14+11	0	3+2	0	0	0	0	0	1	0	4+1	0	36	0
16	DF	(Brazil) Caetano	1+2	0	1	0	1	0	0	0	0	0	1	0	6	0
18	MF	(Japan) Haruya Ide	5+13	0	4+1	1	1	0	0	0	2+1	2	3+1	0	31	3
20	DF	(Japan) Yuta Koike	0	0	0	0	0	0	1	0	1	0	0	0	2	0
21	GK	(Japan) Shota Arai	0	0	4	0	1	0	1	0	0+1	0	0	0	7	0
23	DF	(Japan) Rikuto Hirose	19+9	0	2+3	1	0	0	0	0	2+1	0	1+2	0	39	1
24	DF	(Japan) (United States) Gōtoku Sakai	26+5	1	2+1	0	1+1	0	0+1	0	1	0	2+1	0	41	1
25	MF	(Japan) Yuya Kuwasaki	20+9	1	3+2	0	0	0	0+1	0	3+1	1	3+3	0	45	2
26	FW	(Brazil) Jean Patric	5+14	0	0+3	0	1+1	0	0	0	0	0	3+1	2	28	2
27	FW	(Brazil) Erik	21+8	8	2+2	2	1+1	0	0	0	0+1	0	2+1	1	39	11
29	FW	(Japan) Ren Komatsu	0+4	0	3	1	1	0	0	0	0	0	2+3	0	13	1
30	MF	(Japan) Kakeru Yamauchi	1+9	0	4	0	1+1	0	1	0	1+2	0	2	0	22	0
31	DF	(Japan) Takuya Iwanami	1+6	0	4	1	1	0	1	0	3	0	2	0	18	1
33	MF	(Japan) Rikuto Hashimoto	1	0	0	0	0	0	0	0	1	0	0	0	2	0
35	FW	(Japan) Niina Tominaga	0+1	0	0	0	0	0	1	0	1+1	1	1+1	0	6	1
40	DF	(Japan) Kaito Yamada	0	0	0	0	0	0	0	0	0	0	0	0	0	0
41	DF	(Japan) Katsuya Nagato	16+2	0	2+2	1	0	0	0	0	0	0	3+1	0	26	1
44	MF	(Japan) Mitsuki Hidaka	1+2	0	1+1	0	0	0	1	0	1+1	0	0	0	8	0
50	GK	(Japan) (Nigeria) Powell Obinna Obi	0	0	0	0	0+1	0	0	0	1	0	0	0	2	0
51	MF	(Japan) Taiga Seguchi	0	0	0	0	0	0	0	0	1	0	0	0	1	0
52	MF	(Japan) Kento Hamasaki	1+2	0	0	0	0	0	0	0	1+1	0	1+1	0	7	0
57	MF	(Japan) Ryosuke Irie	0	0	0	0	2	0	0	0	0	0	0	0	2	0
66	DF	(Japan) (Indonesia) Riku Matsuda	2	0	2	0	0	0	0	0	0+1	0	0	0	5	0
71	GK	(Japan) Shūichi Gonda	0	0	0	0	0	0	0	0	0	0	4	0	4	0
77	MF	(Brazil) Gustavo Klismahn	0+9	0	4	0	2	0	0	0	0	0	2	0	17	0
Players featured on a match for the team, but left the club mid-season, either permanently or on loan transfer
5	MF	(Japan) Mitsuki Saito	1+1	0	0	0	0	0	1	0	1+1	0	0	0	5	0
17	MF	(Japan) Tatsunori Sakurai	0	0	0	0	0	0	0	0	0	0	0	0	0	0
22	DF	(Japan) Haruka Motoyama	0	0	0	0	0	0	1	0	2	0	0	0	3	0
33	DF	(Japan) (United States) Justin Homma	0	0	0	0	0	0	0	0	0	0	0	0	0	0
37	DF	(Japan) Shogo Terasaka	0	0	0	0	0	0	0	0	0	0	0	0	0	0
39	GK	(Japan) Shioki Takayama	0	0	0	0	0	0	0	0	0	0	0	0	0	0
