= Kōtarō Uchino =

Japanese footballer (born 2004)

Kōtarō Uchino 内野 航太郎
Personal information
- Date of birth: 19 June 2004 (age 22)
- Place of birth: Kanagawa, Japan
- Height: 1.86 m (6 ft 1 in)
- Position: Forward

Team information
- Current team: Mito HollyHock (on loan from Brøndby)
- Number: 18

Youth career
- SCH FC
- –2022: Yokohama F. Marinos

College career
Years	Team	Apps	(Gls)
2023–2025	University of Tsukuba		

Senior career*
Years	Team	Apps	(Gls)
2025–	Brøndby	5	(0)
2026	→ Vissel Kobe (loan)	3	(0)
2026–	→ Mito HollyHock (loan)	9	(1)

International career
2021	Japan U17		
2022	Japan U18		
2023	Japan U19	4	(1)
2023–2024	Japan U23	10	(5)
Medal record
Men's football
Representing Japan
Asian Games
Silver medal – second place	2022 Hangzhou	Team
AFC U-23 Asian Cup
Gold medal – first place	2024 Qatar	Team
- * Club domestic league appearances and goals as of 19:17, 12 October 2026 (UTC)

Kōtarō Uchino (内野 航太郎, Uchino Kōtarō; born 19 June 2004) is a Japanese footballer currently playing as a forward for J1 League club Mito HollyHock, on loan from Danish Superliga club Brøndby.

== Club career ==
=== Early career ===
Uchino began his career in the academy of Yokohama F. Marinos, where he established himself as a clinical goal-scorer, scoring twenty-one goals in the 2022 season, breaking the all-time record at that level for the number of goals scored in one league season. In July of the same year, as his performances impressed Marinos' board, he was registered for the first team as a "Type 2 player" (term used in Japan to say the player is currently eligible to play both for the U-18s and for the first-team).

Having spoken with Kosei Suwama and Ryotaro Tsunoda, who had both attended the University of Tsukuba, Uchino decided to commit to the university, rather than continue his career with Yokohama. He left Yokohama's youth academy having scored over thirty goals in his last two seasons, including appearances at the Prince Takamado U-18 Premier League, the top division for youth teams in the country.

=== University of Tsukuba ===
Uchino committed to study at the University of Tsukuba ahead of the 2023 season, and he immediately had an impact on the school's football team, scoring seven goals in his first six games. For his goal-scoring exploits, he was compared to both Shuhei Akasaki, who held the record for most goals as a university freshman with thirteen, as well as former University of Tsukuba alumni Kaoru Mitoma, who had also made a name for himself in Japan for his performances at university level. He scored in Tsukuba's 3–2 away loss to Briobecca Urayasu in the Emperor's Cup.

On 2024, he was the top scorer for his university at the Kanto University Football League, and joint-third overall, scoring 11 goals in 19 appearances. He scored the lone goal to tie the match for Tsukuba against the 2024 J1 League leaders at the time, Machida Zelvia. After the 1–1 draw at regulation time, Tsukuba was able to earn a giant-killing win on penalty shoot-out by 4–2, in which Uchino converted his penalty.

=== Brøndby ===
On 23 June 2025, Brøndby IF announced that Uchino would join from the University of Tsukuba on a contract running until June 2029, following a ten-day trial with the Danish Superliga club in March. Football director Benjamin Schmedes described him as "one of Japan's greatest talents of his generation" with "unique individual qualities as a striker" and a "strong will to develop". He joined the squad in early July and made an immediate impression, scoring both goals in a 2–1 pre-season friendly victory over Vejle on 5 July—the first a header from a Nicolai Vallys cross, the second a struck finish from the edge of the area.

On 21 July 2025, Uchino made his competitive debut, coming on as a substitute for Clement Bischoff in a 3–0 Superliga opening-round victory over Silkeborg, becoming the second Japanese player to appear for Brøndby's first team after Yuito Suzuki. His appearances became increasingly limited after Steve Cooper was appointed head coach in September 2025, and by February 2026 Uchino was being left out of match squads entirely.

==== Loan to Vissel Kobe ====
Having made ten appearances across all competitions without scoring in the league, Brøndby announced on 5 March 2026 that Uchino would join Vissel Kobe on loan until 30 June, with no purchase option included in the agreement. Schmedes said the "path to playing time here in Brøndby is a little too long" and that Uchino would return to the club in the summer with three years remaining on his contract.

==== Loan to Mito HollyHock ====
On 19 June 2026, Uchino joined newly promoted J1 League club Mito HollyHock on a season-long loan.

== International career ==
Having been routinely called up for youth team training camps, Uchino was called up to the Japanese under-19 side for the 2023 Maurice Revello Tournament. Buoyed by his performances for the University of Tsukuba football team, he stated that he wanted to score in every single game he played in. However, Japan failed to impress at the tournament, finishing tenth out of twelve teams, with Uchino scoring once in four games.

On 4 April 2024, Uchino was called up to the Japan U23 squad for the 2024 AFC U-23 Asian Cup.

== Style of play ==
During his time in the Yokohama F. Marinos academy, Uchino grew frustrated with his teammates inability to pick him out with their passes. He began watching Shinzo Koroki as a reference for his movement, and developed a better understanding of attacking movement and how to escape his marker, allowing for his teammates to find him with their passes.

He notably studied the games of the University of Tsukuba football team before joining, to fully grasp the team's style of play. On his arrival at the university, he actively communicated with his new teammates, regardless of age, to inform them how he played, and how he would like the ball to be played into him.

He would also watch videos of Norway and Manchester City forward Erling Haaland, but would flip the videos in order to be able to copy his movement and style of play, as Haaland is left-footed, while Uchino favours his right foot.

== Career statistics ==
=== Club ===
As of match played 11 October 2026

Appearances and goals by club, season and competition
Club	Season	League			National Cup		League Cup		Continental		Other		Total	
Club	Season	Division	Apps	Goals	Apps	Goals	Apps	Goals	Apps	Goals	Apps	Goals	Apps	Goals
University of Tsukuba	2023	—			1 (Note: Appearances in the Emperor's Cup)	1	—		—		0	0	1	1
University of Tsukuba	2024	—			3	1	—		—		0	0	3	1
University of Tsukuba	2025	—			2	0	—		—		0	0	2	0
University of Tsukuba	Total		—		6	1	—		—		0	0	6	1
Brøndby	2025–26	Danish Superliga	5	0	2	0	—		3 (Note: Appearances in the UEFA Conference League)	0	—		10	0
Vissel Kobe (loan)	2026	J1 League	3	0	0	0	0	0	0	0	—		3	0
Mito HollyHock (loan)	2026–27	J1 League	9	1	0	0	0	0	0	0	—		9	1
Career total			17	1	8	1	0	0	0	0	0	0	28	2

== Honours ==
Vissel Kobe

- J1 100 Year Vision League: 2026

Japan U23

- AFC U-23 Asian Cup: 2024
