= Gustavo Klismahn =

Brazilian footballer (born 1999)

Personal information
- Full name: Gustavo Klismahn Dimaraes Miranda
- Date of birth: 23 November 1999 (age 26)
- Place of birth: Santana do Araguaia, Brazil
- Height: 1.79 m (5 ft 10 in)
- Position: Midfielder

Team information
- Current team: Neftçi
- Number: 20

Youth career
- 2013–2018: Desportivo Brasil
- 2018–2021: Estoril

Senior career*
Years	Team	Apps	(Gls)
2021–2022	Alverca	25	(5)
2022–2024	Portimonense	15	(0)
2023–2024	→ Santa Clara (loan)	32	(1)
2024–	Santa Clara	28	(1)
2025–2026	→ Vissel Kobe (loan)	9	(0)
2026–	Neftçi	12	(6)
- * Club domestic league appearances and goals as of 22 November 2026

Gustavo Klismahn Dimaraes Miranda (born 23 November 1999), sometimes known as just Klismahn, is a Brazilian professional footballer who plays as a midfielder for Azerbaijan Premier League club Neftçi PFK.

== Professional career ==
Klismahn is a youth product of the Brazilian club Desportivo Brasil, before moving to the U23 side of Estoril between 2018 and 2021. In the summer of 2021, he transferred to Alverca in the Liga 3 on 15 July 2021. After a successful season, he moved to the Primeira Liga side Portimonense on 13 July 2022. He made his professional debut with Portimonense in a 1–0 Primeira Liga win over C.S. Marítimo on 27 August 2022, coming on as a substitute in the 73rd minute.

On 28 June 2023, Portimonense sent Klismahn on a season-long loan to recently-relegated to Liga Portugal 2 side Santa Clara. On 21 June 2024, Santa Clara activated the option to buy Klismahn free.

On 3 March 2025, Santa Clara sent Klismahn on loan to J1 League club Vissel Kobe until the end of the 2025 season. At the end of the loan spell, in which he made 17 appearances, he returned to the Azores-based side.

On 20 June 2026, Azerbaijan Premier League club Neftçi PFK signed a 2+1 year contract with Klismahn.

== Personal life ==
Klismahn was named by his father after the German footballer Jürgen Klinsmann.

== Career statistics ==
As of match played 11 May 2026

Appearances and goals by club, season and competition
Club	Season	League			Cup		League cup		Europe		Other		Total	
Club	Season	Division	Apps	Goals	Apps	Goals	Apps	Goals	Apps	Goals	Apps	Goals	Apps	Goals
Alverca	2021–22	Liga 3	25	5	2	0	—		—		2 (Note: Appearances in promotion play-offs)	0	29	5
Portimonense	2022–23	Primeira Liga	15	0	1	0	3	0	—		—		19	0
Santa Clara (loan)	2023–24	Primeira Liga	32	1	4	1	1	0	—		—		37	2
Santa Clara	2024–25	Primeira Liga	17	0	2	0	1	0	—		—		20	0
Santa Clara	2025–26	Primeira Liga	15	1	—		—		—		—		15	1
Santa Clara	Total		32	1	2	0	1	0	—		35	1		
Vissel Kobe (loan)	2025	J1 League	9	0	4	0	2	0	2 (Note: Appearances in AFC Champions League Elite)	0	—		16	0
Career total			113	7	13	1	7	0	2	0	2	0	156	8
