= Koya Yuruki =

Japanese footballer

Koya Yuruki 汰木 康也
Personal information
- Full name: Koya Yuruki
- Date of birth: 3 July 1995 (age 31)
- Place of birth: Kanagawa, Japan
- Height: 1.83 m (6 ft 0 in)
- Position: Winger

Team information
- Current team: Kashiwa Reysol
- Number: 16

Youth career
- 2002–2003: Hara FC
- 2004–2013: Yokohama F. Marinos

Senior career*
Years	Team	Apps	(Gls)
2014–2018	Montedio Yamagata	92	(6)
2014–2015	→ J.League U-22 Selection (loan)	18	(1)
2019–2021	Urawa Red Diamonds	69	(5)
2022–2025	Vissel Kobe	94	(11)
2026–	Kashiwa Reysol	10	(1)
Medal record
Montedio Yamagata
Runner-up	Emperor's Cup	2014
- * Club domestic league appearances and goals as of 10 August 2026

Koya Yuruki (汰木 康也, Yuruki Kōya; born 3 July 1995 in Kanagawa, Japan) is a Japanese professional footballer who plays as a winger for J1 League club Kashiwa Reysol.

== Career ==
=== Montedio Yamagata ===
Yuruki made his official debut for Montedio Yamagata in the J. League Division 2, on 2 March 2014 against Shonan Bellmare in Shonan BMW Stadium Hiratsuka in Hiratsuka, Japan. He subbed in the match for Hiroki Bandai in the 74th minute. Hidaka and his club lost the match 1–0.

=== Vissel Kobe ===
In December 2021, it was announced that Yuruki would be joining Vissel Kobe.

=== Kashiwa Reysol ===
After four seasons with Vissel Kobe, Yuruki joined Kashiwa Reysol ahead of the J1 100 Year Vision League.

== Club statistics ==
As of 23 March 2026

Appearances and goals by club, season and competition
Club	Season	League			National cup (Note: Includes Emperors Cup)		League cup (Note: Includes J.League Cup)		Continental		Other		Total	
Club	Season	Division	Apps	Goals	Apps	Goals	Apps	Goals	Apps	Goals	Apps	Goals	Apps	Goals
Montedio Yamagata	2014	J.League Division 2	2	0	2	0	0	0	–		–		4	0
Montedio Yamagata	2015	J1 League	1	0	1	0	1	0	–		–		3	0
Montedio Yamagata	2016	J2 League	21	2	0	0	0	0	–		–		21	2
Montedio Yamagata	2017	J2 League	37	2	2	0	0	0	–		–		39	2
Montedio Yamagata	2018	J2 League	31	2	4	2	0	0	–		–		35	4
Montedio Yamagata	Total		92	6	9	2	1	0	0	0	0	0	102	8
J.League U-22 Selection (loan)	2014	J3 League	2	0	–		–		–		–		2	0
J.League U-22 Selection (loan)	2015	J3 League	16	1	–		–		–		–		16	1
J.League U-22 Selection (loan)	Total		18	1	0	0	0	0	0	0	0	0	18	1
Urawa Reds	2019	J1 League	8	0	3	0	2	0	5 (Note: Appearances in AFC Champions League Elite)	0	–		18	0
Urawa Reds	2020	J1 League	30	1	0	0	1	0	0	0	–		31	1
Urawa Reds	2021	J1 League	31	4	4	0	11	1	0	0	–		46	5
Urawa Reds	Total		69	5	7	0	14	1	5	0	0	0	95	6
Vissel Kobe	2022	J1 League	32	5	3	0	2	0	6	3	0	0	43	8
Vissel Kobe	2023	J1 League	28	3	4	2	2	0	0	0	0	0	34	5
Vissel Kobe	2024	J1 League	10	1	2	0	1	0	6	0	0	0	19	1
Vissel Kobe	2025	J1 League	24	2	4	0	1	0	5	2	1 (Note: Appearance in Japanese Super Cup)	0	35	4
Vissel Kobe	Total		94	11	13	2	6	0	17	5	1	0	131	18
Kashiwa Reysol	2026	J1 (100)	2	0	–		–		–		–		2	0
Career total			275	23	29	4	21	1	22	5	1	0	348	33

== Honours ==
Vissel Kobe

- J1 League: 2023, 2024
