= Haruka Motoyama =

Japanese footballer

Personal information
- Full name: Haruka Motoyama
- Date of birth: 5 June 1999 (age 27)
- Place of birth: Nagasaki, Japan
- Height: 1.71 m (5 ft 7 in)
- Position: Defender

Team information
- Current team: Fagiano Okayama (on loan from Vissel Kobe)
- Number: 26

Youth career
- Nishinomiya SS
- –2017: Vissel Kobe

College career
Years	Team	Apps	(Gls)
2018–2021	Kwansei Gakuin University		

Senior career*
Years	Team	Apps	(Gls)
2022–2025	Fagiano Okayama	100	(5)
2025–	Vissel Kobe	0	(0)
2025–	→ Fagiano Okayama (loan)	20	(0)
- * Club domestic league appearances and goals as of 12 August 2026

Haruka Motoyama (本山 遥, Motoyama Haruka; born 5 June 1999) is a Japanese footballer currently playing as a defender for Fagiano Okayama on loan from Vissel Kobe.

== Career statistics ==
=== Club ===
As of 20 February 2022.

Club	Season	League			National Cup		League Cup		Other		Total	
Club	Season	Division	Apps	Goals	Apps	Goals	Apps	Goals	Apps	Goals	Apps	Goals
Kwansei Gakuin University	2021	–			2 (Note: Appearances in the Emperor's Cup)	0	–		0	0	2	0
Fagiano Okayama	2022	J2 League	1	0	0	0	0	0	0	0	1	0
Career total			1	0	2	0	0	0	0	0	3	0
