= Rikuto Hashimoto =

Japanese footballer

Rikuto Hashimoto 橋本 陸斗
Personal information
- Date of birth: 2 April 2005 (age 21)
- Place of birth: Tokyo, Japan
- Height: 1.70 m (5 ft 7 in)
- Position: Midfielder

Team information
- Current team: Vissel Kobe
- Number: 33

Youth career
- FC Waragoma
- –2021: Tokyo Verdy

Senior career*
Years	Team	Apps	(Gls)
2021–2024	Tokyo Verdy	6	(0)
2023–2024	→ YSCC Yokohama (loan)	34	(1)
2025–	Vissel Kobe	1	(0)
2025	→ Roasso Kumamoto (loan)	0	(0)

International career
2020	Japan U16	1	(0)
- * Club domestic league appearances and goals as of 10 August 2026

Rikuto Hashimoto (橋本 陸斗, Hashimoto Rikuto) is a Japanese footballer who plays as a midfielder for J2 League club Roasso Kumamoto on loan from J1 League club, Vissel Kobe.

== Early life ==
Rikuto Hashimoto was born in Tokyo, Japan. His mother is Japanese and his father is Bangladeshi. He is also eligible to represent Bangladesh from his Bangladeshi parental side.

He began playing football at approximately four years of age, when his mother took him to a futsal school. He considered a professional career during his second year of junior high school.

Hashimoto began playing football with FC Waragoma before joining Tokyo Verdy's youth system, progressing through the club's junior, junior youth and youth teams.

== Club career ==
Hashimoto made his professional debut for Tokyo Verdy against Ehime on 28 February 2021, coming on as a substitute in the 79th minute. He became the third-youngest player in J.League history to make his debut, at the age of 15 years and 10 months.

On 6 January 2025, Hashimoto announced his official transfer to J1 champions club, Vissel Kobe for the 2025 season. He made his debut for the club on 18 February 2025 in an AFC Champions League Elite match against Shanghai Shenhua.

In July 2025, Hashimoto joined Roasso Kumamoto on a development-type loan for the remainder of the season. He returned to Vissel Kobe in December 2025.

In 2026, he captained Vissel Kobe's under-21 team in the inaugural 2026–27 U-21 J.League competition.

== International career ==
Hashimoto represented Japan at the under-16 level in 2020. He appeared in the 2020 SBS Cup Dream Youth Soccer tournament, starting in Japan U-16's semifinal match against Shimizu S-Pulse Youth on 21 September 2020. He was substituted in the 53rd minute as Japan lost 3–1.

== Honours ==
Vissel Kobe

- J1 100 Year Vision League: 2026

== Career statistics ==
=== Club ===
As of the start for 2025 season.

Appearances and goals by club, season and competition
Club	Season	League			National Cup		League Cup		Other		Total	
Club	Season	Division	Apps	Goals	Apps	Goals	Apps	Goals	Apps	Goals	Apps	Goals
Japan			League		Emperor's Cup		J. League Cup		Other		Total	
Tokyo Verdy	2021	J2 League	3	0	0	0	–		–		3	0
Tokyo Verdy	2022	J2 League	3	0	1	0	–		–		4	0
Tokyo Verdy	2023	J2 League	0	0	0	0	–		–		0	0
Tokyo Verdy	Total		6	0	1	0	0	0	0	0	7	0
YSCC Yokohama (loan)	2023	J3 League	7	0	0	0	–		–		7	0
YSCC Yokohama (loan)	2024	J3 League	27	1	0	0	1	0	–		28	1
YSCC Yokohama (loan)	Total		34	1	0	0	1	0	0	0	35	0
Vissel Kobe	2025	J1 League	0	0	0	0	0	0	–		0	0
Vissel Kobe	Total		0	0	0	0	0	0	0	0	0	0
Career total			40	1	1	0	1	0	0	0	42	1
